= List of Carolina Panthers team records =

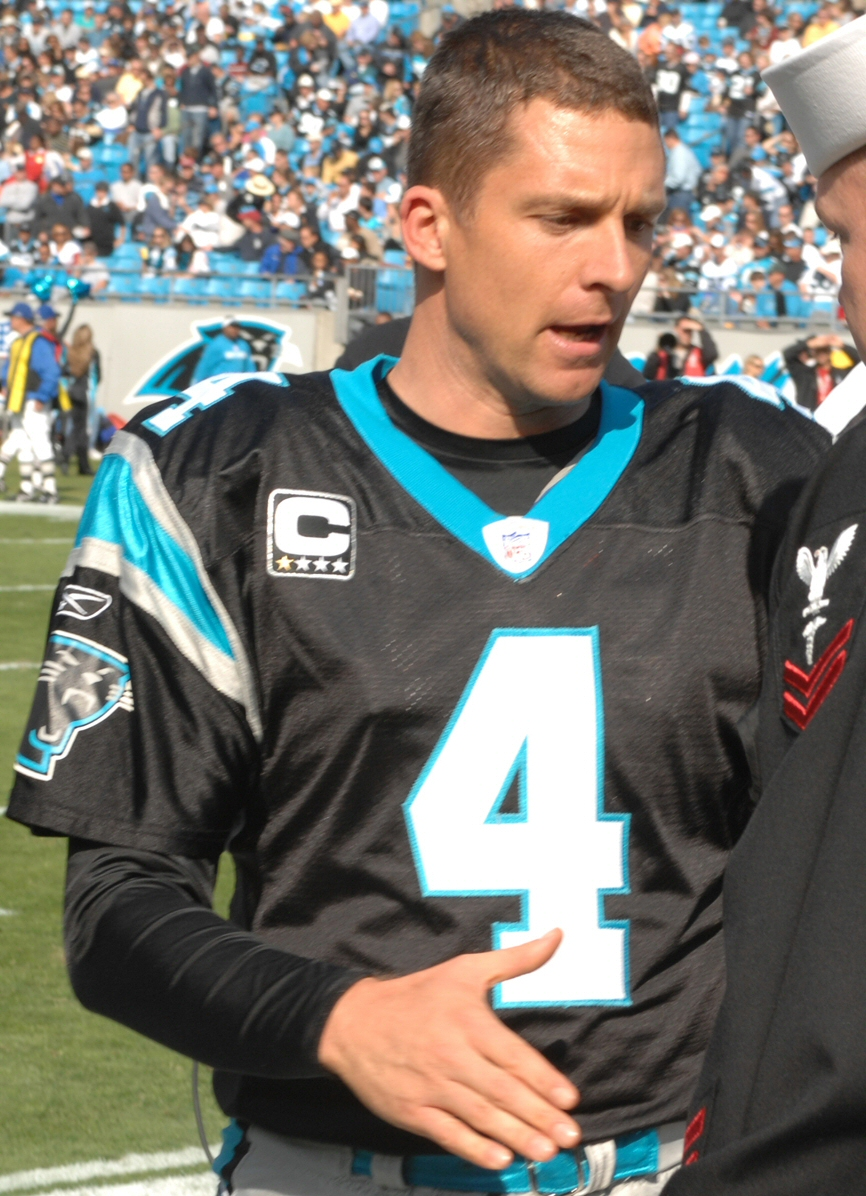
Kicker John Kasay, the team's highest-scoring career player. Kasay played for the Panthers from 1995 to 2010

The Carolina Panthers are an American professional football club based in Charlotte, North Carolina and representing the Carolinas. The team, which plays in the South division of the National Football Conference (NFC) of the National Football League (NFL), began play in 1995 as an expansion team. From 1995-2001, the team was a member of the West division of the NFC.

This list encompasses the major honors won by the Carolina Panthers as well as records set by the team, its coaches, and its players. Attendance records at Bank of America Stadium, the team's home stadium since 1996, are also included in this list. All records are accurate as of the end of the 2025 season.

== Honors ==
- NFC championship games
  - Winners (2): 2003, 2015
  - Losers (2): 1996, 2005
- Division championships
  - Winners (6): 1996, 2003, 2008, 2013, 2014, 2015, 2025
  - Runners-up (6): 1997, 1999, 2005, 2006, 2007, 2012, 2017
- Playoff appearances
  - Appearances (8): 1996, 2003, 2005, 2008, 2013, 2014, 2015, 2017, 2025

=== Retired numbers ===
Carolina Panthers retired numbers
No.	Player	Position	Tenure
51	Sam Mills	LB	1995–1997

== Player records ==
Key
Symbol	Meaning
No.	nth highest rank
XPM	Extra points made
XPA	Extra points attempted
FGM	Field goals made
FGA	Field goals attempted
2PT	Two-point conversions
Rtg.	Quarterback rating
†	Current player for the Carolina Panthers
^{*}	Active player for another NFL team
**Bolded text**	League-leader in statistical category for the season

=== Career ===
==== Games played ====
No.	Player	Position	Years	Total	Regular season	Playoffs	Ref.
1	J. J. Jansen†	LS	2009–present	285	277	8	
2	John Kasay	K	1995–2010	231	221	10	
3	Steve Smith	WR	2001–2013	191	182	9	
4	Thomas Davis	LB	2005–2018	187	176	11	
5	Jordan Gross	T	2003–2013	176	167	9	

==== Top scorers (career) ====
No.	Player	Position	Years	Touchdowns	XPM	XPA	FGM	FGA	2PT	Points (Note: Touchdowns are worth six points, extra points are worth three points, safeties and two-point conversions are worth two points and extra points are worth one point.)	Ref.
1	John Kasay	K	1995–2010	0	429	438	351	424	0	1,482	
2	Graham Gano^{*}	K	2012–2019	0	247	260	165	193	0	742	
3	Steve Smith	WR	2001–2013	75 (Note: 67 receiving touchdowns, 6 return touchdowns, 2 rushing touchdowns)	0	0	0	0	2	454	
4	Cam Newton	QB	2011–2019; 2021	63	0	0	0	0	2	382	
5	Jonathan Stewart	RB	2008–2017	58 (Note: 51 rushing touchdowns, 7 receiving touchdowns)	0	0	0	0	0	348	

==== Passing (career) ====
No.	Player	Years	Completions	Attempts	Yards	Touchdowns	Interceptions	Rtg.	Ref.
1	Cam Newton	2011–2019; 2021	2,440	4,106	29,725	186	113	85.4	
2	Jake Delhomme	2003–2009	1,580	2,669	19,258	120	89	82.6	
3	Steve Beuerlein	1996–2000	1,041	1,723	12,690	86	50	87.7	
4	Kerry Collins	1995–1998	694	1,340	8,306	47	54	66.0	
5	Bryce Young†	2023–present	853	1,389	8,291	49	30	80.9	

==== Rushing (career) ====
No.	Player	Years	Attempts	Yards	Average	Touchdowns	Ref.
1	Jonathan Stewart	2008–2017	1,669	7,318	4.3	51	
2	DeAngelo Williams	2006–2014	1,432	6,846	4.8	46	
3	Cam Newton	2011–2019; 2021	981	5,306	5.1	63	
4	Christian McCaffrey^{*}	2017–2022	866	3,980	4.6	32	
5	Chuba Hubbard†	2021–present	889	3,686	4.1	23	

==== Receiving (career) ====
No.	Player	Position	Years	Receptions	Yards	Average	Touchdowns	Ref.
1	Steve Smith	WR	2001–2013	836	12,197	14.6	67	
2	Muhsin Muhammad	WR	1996–2004; 2008–2009	696	9,255	13.3	50	
3	Greg Olsen	TE	2011–2019	524	6,463	12.3	39	
4	D. J. Moore^{*}	WR	2018–2022	364	5,201	14.3	21	
5	Wesley Walls	TE	1996–2002	324	3,902	12.0	44	

==== Sacks (career) ====
No.	Player	Position	Years	Sacks	Ref.
1	Julius Peppers	DE	2002–2009; 2017–2018	97.0	
2	Charles Johnson	DE	2007–2017	67.5	
3	Mike Rucker	DE	1999–2007	55.5	
4	Mario Addison	DE	2012–2019	55.0	
5	Brian Burns^{*}	EDGE	2019–2023	46.0	

==== Interceptions (career) ====
No.	Player	Position	Years	Interceptions	Yards	Touchdowns	Ref.
1	Chris Gamble	CB	2004–2012	27	326	2	
2	Eric Davis	CB	1996–2000	25	226	2	
3	Luke Kuechly	LB	2012–2019	18	168	1	
4	Mike Minter	S	1997–2006	17	421	4	
5	Richard Marshall	CB	2006–2010	14	315	2	
5	Donte Jackson^{*}	CB	2018–2023	14	186	1	
5	Doug Evans	CB	1998–2001	14	162	1	

=== Season ===
==== Top scorers (season) ====
No.	Player	Position	Season	Touchdowns	XPM	XPA	FGM	FGA	2PT	Points	Ref.
1	Graham Gano^{*}	K	2015	0	56	59	30	36	0	146	
2	John Kasay	K	1996	0	34	35	**37** (Note: Formerly the NFL single-season record for most field goals made in a single season.)	**45**	0	**145**	
3	John Kasay	K	2008	0	**46**	**46**	28	31	0	130	
4	Eddy Piñeiro^{*}	K	2022	0	30	32	33	35	0	129	
5	John Kasay	K	2003	0	29	30	32	38	0	125	

==== Passing (season) ====
No.	Player	Season	Completions	Attempts	Yards	Touchdowns	Interceptions	Rtg.	Ref.
1	Steve Beuerlein	1999	**343**	571	**4,436**	36	15	94.6	
2	Cam Newton	2011	310	517	4,051	21	17	84.5	
3	Jake Delhomme	2004	310	533	3,886	29	15	87.3	
4	Cam Newton	2012	280	485	3,869	19	12	86.2	
5	Cam Newton	2015	296	495	3,837	35	10	99.7	

==== Passing (rookie season) ====
No.	Player	Season	Completions	Attempts	Yards	Touchdowns	Interceptions	Rtg.	Ref.
1	Cam Newton	2011	310	517	4,051 (Note: Formerly the NFL single-season record for rookie quarterbacks.)	21	17	84.5	
2	Chris Weinke	2001	293	540	2,931	11	19	62.0	
3	Bryce Young†	2023	315	527	2,877	11	10	73.7	
4	Kerry Collins	1995	214	433	2,717	14	19	61.9	
5	Jimmy Clausen	2010	157	299	1,558	3	9	58.4	

==== Rushing (season) ====
No.	Player	Season	Attempts	Yards	Average	Touchdowns	Ref.
1	DeAngelo Williams	2008	273	1,515	5.5	**18**	
2	Stephen Davis	2003	318	1,444	4.5	8	
3	Christian McCaffrey^{*}	2019	287	1,387	4.8	15	
4	Chuba Hubbard†	2024	250	1,195	4.8	10	
5	Jonathan Stewart	2009	221	1,133	5.1	10	

==== Rushing (rookie season) ====
No.	Player	Position	Season	Attempts	Yards	Average	Touchdowns	Ref.
1	Jonathan Stewart	RB	2008	184	836	4.5	10	
2	Fred Lane	RB	1997	182	809	4.4	7	
3	Cam Newton	QB	2011	126	706 (Note: Formerly the NFL single-season record for rookie quarterbacks.)	5.6	14 (Note: NFL single-season record for rookie quarterbacks, formerly the NFL single-season record for any quarterback.)	
4	Chuba Hubbard†	RB	2021	172	612	3.6	5	
5	DeAngelo Williams	RB	2006	121	501	4.1	1	

==== Receiving (season) ====
No.	Player	Season	Receptions	Yards	Average	Touchdowns	Ref.
1	Steve Smith	2005 (Note: Third player since the 1970 AFL-NFL merger to win the receiving 'triple crown' (leading the NFL in receptions, yards, and touchdowns in a seasons).)	**103**	**1,563**	15.2	**12**	
2	Steve Smith	2008	78	1,421	18.1	6	
3	Muhsin Muhammad	2004	93	**1,405**	15.1	**16**	
4	Steve Smith	2011	79	1,394	17.6	7	
5	Muhsin Muhammad	1999	96	1,253	13.1	8	

==== Receiving (rookie season) ====
No.	Player	Season	Receptions	Yards	Average	Touchdowns	Ref.
1	Tetairoa McMillan†	2025	70	**1,014**	14.5	**7**	
2	Kelvin Benjamin	2014	73	1,008	13.8	9	
3	D. J. Moore^{*}	2018	55	788	14.3	2	
4	Keary Colbert	2004	47	754	16.0	5	
5	Christian McCaffrey^{*}	2017	80	651	8.1	5	

==== Sacks (season) ====
No.	Player	Position	Season	Sacks	Ref.
1	Kevin Greene	OLB	1998	15	
1	Greg Hardy	DE	2013	15	
3	Kevin Greene	OLB	1996	**14.5**	
3	Julius Peppers	DE	2008	14.5	
5	Lamar Lathon	OLB	1996	13.5	

==== Sacks (rookie season) ====
No.	Player	Position	Season	Sacks	Ref.
1	Julius Peppers	DE	2002	12	
2	Brian Burns^{*}	EDGE	2019	7.5	
3	Nic Scourton†	EDGE	2025	5	
4	Thomas Keiser	EDGE	2011	4	
4	Kony Ealy	DE	2014	4	

==== Interceptions (season) ====
No.	Player	Position	Season	Interceptions	Yards	Touchdowns	Ref.
1	Doug Evans	CB	2001	8	126	1	
2	Chris Gamble	CB	2005	7	157	1	
2	Kurt Coleman	S	2015	7	79	1	
4	Brett Maxie	S	1995	6	59	0	
4	Chris Gamble	CB	2004	6	15	0	
4	Ken Lucas	CB	2005	6	70	0	

==== Interceptions (rookie season) ====
No.	Player	Position	Season	Interceptions	Yards	Touchdowns	Ref.
1	Chris Gamble	CB	2004	6	15	0	
2	Donte Jackson^{*}	CB	2018	4	0	0	
3	Ricky Manning	CB	2003	3	33	1	
3	Richard Marshall	CB	2006	3	59	1	
3	Sherrod Martin	S	2009	3	15	0	
3	Robert Lester	S	2013	3	5	0	

=== Game ===
==== Passing yards (game) ====
No.	Player	Game	Yards	Ref.
1	Bryce Young†	November 16, 2025 vs. Atlanta Falcons	448	
2	Cam Newton	September 18, 2011 vs. Green Bay Packers	432	
3	Chris Weinke	December 10, 2006 vs. New York Giants	423	
4	Cam Newton	September 11, 2011 at Arizona Cardinals	422 (Note: NFL record for a rookie quarterback in his debut game.)	
5	Cam Newton	October 2, 2011 at Chicago Bears	374	

==== Rushing yards (game) ====
No.	Player	Game	Yards	Ref.
1	DeAngelo Williams	December 30, 2012 at New Orleans Saints	210	
2	Jonathan Stewart	December 27, 2009 at New York Giants	206	
2	Rico Dowdle†	October 5, 2025 vs. Miami Dolphins	206	
4	DeAngelo Williams	December 8, 2008 vs. Tampa Bay Buccaneers	186	
5	Christian McCaffrey^{*}	September 23, 2018 vs. Cincinnati Bengals	184	

==== Receiving yards (game) ====
No.	Player	Game	Yards	Ref.
1	Steve Smith	January 15, 2006 at Chicago Bears (Note: Postseason game)	218	
2	Steve Smith	October 30, 2005 vs. Minnesota Vikings	201	
3	Muhsin Muhammad	September 13, 1998 at New Orleans Saints	192	
4	Muhsin Muhammad	November 16, 2003 vs. Washington Redskins	189	
4	Steve Smith	October 15, 2006 at Baltimore Ravens	189	

== Coaching records ==
- First head coach: Dom Capers (1995–98)
- Longest-serving head coach: John Fox (2002–2010)
- Most regular season games as head coach: John Fox - 144 games
- Most regular season wins for a head coach: Ron Rivera - 76 wins
- Best regular season winning % for a head coach: Ron Rivera - .546
- Most playoff appearances as head coach: Ron Rivera - 4 appearances
- Most playoff games as head coach: John Fox - 8 games
- Most playoff wins for a head coach: John Fox - 5 wins
- Best playoff winning % for a head coach: John Fox - .625

== Team records ==
=== Overall ===
Carolina Panthers all-time record
	Regular season	Playoffs	Total
Games	501	18	519
Record	227–273–1	9–9	236–282–1
Percentage	.454	.500	.456

=== Games ===
- First game: 20-14 win over Jacksonville (July 29, 1995; preseason, Pro Football Hall of Fame Game)
- First regular-season game: 23-20 OT loss to Atlanta (September 3, 1995)
- First playoff game: 26-17 win over Dallas (January 5, 1997)
- First Super Bowl: 32-29 loss to New England (February 1, 2004; Super Bowl XXXVIII)

=== Record results ===
- Record win: 38-0 vs. New York Giants (September 22, 2013), 38-0 Atlanta (December 13, 2015)
- Record regular-season win: 38-0 vs. New York Giants (September 22, 2013), 38-0 Atlanta (December 13, 2015)
- Record playoff win: 23-0 at New York Giants (January 8, 2006)
- Record loss: 9-52 at Oakland (December 24, 2000)
- Record regular-season loss: 9-52 at Oakland (December 24, 2000)
- Record playoff loss: 14-34 at Seattle (January 22, 2006)

=== Streaks ===
- Longest winning streak (within one season): 14 (2015)
- Longest winning streak (excluding playoffs): 17 (2014 - 2015)
- Longest winning streak (start of season): 14 (2015)
- Longest losing streak (regular season): 15 (2001)
- Longest losing streak (start of season): 7 (1998)

=== Wins/losses/ties in a seasons ===
- Most wins (single regular season): 15 (2015)
- Most losses (single regular season): 15 (2001, 2023)
- Most ties (single regular season): 1 (2014)
- Fewest wins (single regular season): 1 (2001)
- Fewest losses (single regular season): 1 (2015)

=== Points ===
- Most points scored in a season: 500 (2015)
- Least points scored in a season: 196 (2010)
- Most points allowed in a season: 534 (2024)
- Least points allowed in a season: 218 (1996)
- Most points scored in a game: 52 vs. Cincinnati (December 8, 2002)
- Most points conceded in a game: 52 at Oakland (December 24, 2000) and Pittsburgh (November 8, 2018)
- Most points scored in a preseason game: 47 vs. Washington Redskins (August 23, 2008)
- Most points scored by both teams in a game: 84 Panthers (35) at Detroit Lions (49) (November 20, 2011)
- Fewest points scored by both teams in a game: 9 Panthers (0) vs. Tampa Bay Buccaneers (9) (January 7, 2024)
- Most points scored by both teams in a postseason game: 65 Panthers (31) vs. Los Angeles Rams (34) (January 10, 2026)
- Fewest points scored by both teams in a postseason game: 17 Panthers (14) at Philadelphia Eagles (3) (January 18, 2004)
- Most points scored in a first quarter: 21 at Washington Redskins (October 3, 1999); at San Diego Chargers (December 16, 2012); vs. Atlanta Falcons (December 13, 2015)
- Most points scored in a second quarter: 24 at San Francisco 49ers (October 17, 1999); vs. Green Bay Packers (November 8, 2015); vs. Tampa Bay Buccaneers (January 3, 2016)
- Most points scored in a third quarter: 21 vs. Cincinnati Bengals (December 8, 2002); vs. Arizona Cardinals (October 26, 2008); vs. Tampa Bay Buccaneers (December 24, 2011); vs. Miami Dolphins (November 13, 2017)
- Most points scored in a fourth quarter: 23 at Atlanta Falcons (October 2, 2016)
- Most points scored in a first half: 35 vs. Tampa Bay Buccaneers (November 4, 2018)
- Most points scored in a second half: 36 vs. Cincinnati Bengals (December 8, 2002)
- Most points scored by both teams in a first quarter: 28 Panthers (7) at Pittsburgh Steelers (21) (November 8, 2018) and Panthers (14) vs Washington Redskins (14) (November 22, 2015)
- Most points scored by both teams in a second quarter: 35 Panthers (21) vs. Tampa Bay Buccaneers (14) (November 4, 2018) and Panthers (14) at Atlanta Falcons (21) (January 5, 2025)
- Most points scored by both teams in a third quarter: 35 Panthers (21) vs. Cincinnati Bengals (14) (December 8, 2002)
- Most points scored by both teams in a fourth quarter: 43 Panthers (15) at Atlanta Falcons (28) (November 23, 2008)
- Most points scored by both teams in a first half: 52 Panthers (24) at Washington Redskins (28) (October 3, 1999)
- Most points scored by both teams in a second half: 54 Panthers (20) at Atlanta Falcons (34) (October 4, 1998) and Panthers (23) at Atlanta Falcons (31) (October 2, 2016)
- Fewest points scored by both teams in a first half: 0 Panthers vs. Seattle Seahawks (December 16, 2007)
- Fewest points scored by both teams in a second half: 0 Panthers at New Orleans Saints (October 19, 1997); Panthers vs. Baltimore Ravens (September 8, 2002); Panthers vs. St. Louis Rams (December 12, 2004); Panthers at Atlanta Falcons (December 24, 2006); Panthers at Chicago Bears (October 22, 2017)
- Most points allowed in a first quarter: 21 at St Louis Rams (November 11, 2001), at Green Bay Packers (October 19, 2014) and at Pittsburgh Steelers (November 8, 2018)
- Most points allowed in a second quarter: 28 at Washington Redskins (October 3, 1999), vs. Philadelphia Eagles (September 13, 2009) and at Cincinnati Bengals (November 6, 2022)
- Most points allowed in a third quarter: 28 at Buffalo Bills (September 10, 1995)
- Most points allowed in a fourth quarter: 28 at Atlanta Falcons (November 23, 2008)
- Most points allowed in a first half: 35 vs. New Orleans Saints (December 29, 2019) and at Cincinnati Bengals (November 6, 2022)
- Most points allowed in a second half: 35 at Detroit Lions (November 20, 2011)
- Most points scored in a first quarter in postseason: 17 vs. Arizona Cardinals (January 24, 2016)
- Most points scored in a second quarter in postseason: 17 vs. Seattle Seahawks (January 17, 2016)
- Most points scored in a third quarter in postseason: 14 vs. Arizona Cardinals (January 3, 2015)
- Most points scored in a fourth quarter in postseason: 19 at New England Patriots (February 1, 2004)
- Most points scored in a first half in postseason: 31 vs. Seattle Seahawks (January 17, 2016)
- Most points scored in a second half in postseason: 25 vs. Arizona Cardinals (January 24, 2016)
- Most points allowed in a first quarter in postseason: 14 vs. Arizona Cardinals (January 10, 2009)
- Most points allowed in a second quarter in postseason: 17 at Green Bay Packers (January 12, 1997)
- Most points allowed in a third quarter in postseason: 14 vs. Seattle Seahawks (January 17, 2016)
- Most points allowed in a fourth quarter in postseason: 18 at New England Patriots (February 1, 2004)
- Most points allowed in a first half in postseason: 27 vs. Arizona Cardinals (January 10, 2009)
- Most points allowed in a second half in postseason: 24 vs. Seattle Seahawks (January 17, 2016)
- Most points scored by both teams in a first quarter in postseason: 21 Panthers (7) vs. Arizona Cardinals (14) (January 10, 2009)
- Most points scored by both teams in a second quarter in postseason: 24 Panthers (10) at New England Patriots (14) (February 1, 2004); Panthers (14) vs. Los Angeles Rams (10) (January 10, 2026)
- Most points scored by both teams in a third quarter in postseason: 14 Panthers (7) at Chicago Bears (7) (January 15, 2006); Panthers (14) vs. Arizona Cardinals (0) (January 3, 2015); Panthers (0) vs. Seattle Seahawks (14) (January 17, 2016)
- Most points scored by both teams in a fourth quarter in postseason: 37 Panthers (19) at New England Patriots (18) (February 1, 2004)
- Most points scored by both teams in a first half in postseason: 34 Panthers (7) vs. Arizona Cardinals (27) (January 10, 2009)
- Most points scored by both teams in a second half in postseason: 37 Panthers (19) at New England Patriots (18) (February 1, 2004)
- Fewest points scored by both teams in a first half in postseason: 10 Panthers (7) at Philadelphia Eagles (3) (January 18, 2004); Panthers (10) at New York Giants (0) (January 6, 2006)
- Fewest points scored by both teams in a second half in postseason: 7 Panthers (7) at Philadelphia Eagles (0) (January 18, 2004)
- Largest deficit overcome in a game: 17 vs. Jacksonville (September 7, 2003), at San Francisco (November 14, 2004), at Philadelphia (October 21, 2018), and vs. Miami (October 5, 2025)
- Highest points differential (Note: Points scored minus points allowed) in a season: +192 (2015)
- Lowest points differential in a season: -212 (2010)

=== Touchdowns ===
- Most touchdowns scored by both teams in a game: 11 Panthers (6) at Atlanta Falcons (5) (January 5, 2025); Panthers (6) at New Orleans Saints (5) (December 6, 2015); Panthers (4) at Detroit Lions (7) (November 20, 2011); Panthers (7) vs. Cincinnati Bengals (4) (December 8, 2002)
- Fewest touchdowns scored by both teams in a game: 0 Panthers vs. Tampa Bay Buccaneers (January 7, 2024); Panthers vs. Buffalo Bills (September 17, 2017); Panthers vs. Tampa Bay Buccaneers (October 17, 2002); Panthers at Atlanta Falcons (September 7, 1997)

=== Total net yards ===
- Most total yards by both teams in a game: 971 Panthers (530) at New Orleans Saints (441) (December 30, 2012)
- Most total yards by both teams in one half: 574 Panthers (294) vs. Jacksonville Jaguars (280) (October 6, 2019) (2nd half)
- Most total yards by both teams in one quarter: 429 Panthers (251) at New England Patriots (178) (February 1, 2004) (4th quarter)
- Fewest total yards in a game: 113 at Buffalo Bills (September 10, 1995)
- Fewest total yards in one half: 0 at Pittsburgh Steelers (December 15, 2002) (1st half)
- Fewest total yards in one quarter: -10 vs. Tampa Bay Buccaneers (October 17, 2002) (1st quarter); at Jacksonville Jaguars (December 31, 2023) (2nd quarter)
- Fewest total yards allowed in a game: 96 vs. Arizona Cardinals (November 19, 1995)
- Fewest total yards allowed in one half: 14 vs. Detroit Lions (December 21, 2003) (2nd half)
- Fewest total yards allowed in one quarter: 0 vs. Kansas City Chiefs (October 5, 2008) (1st quarter)
- Fewest total yards by both teams in a game: 356 Panthers (130) vs. Tampa Bay Buccaneers (226) (October 17, 2002)
- Fewest total yards by both teams in one half: 134 Panthers (15) vs. Tampa Bay Buccaneers (119) (October 17, 2002) (1st half)
- Fewest total yards by both teams in one quarter: 47 Panthers (15) at Chicago Bears (32) (October 22, 2017) (4th quarter)

=== Attendances ===
- Largest home attendance (regular season): 592,454 (2015)
- Largest home attendance (single game):

76,136 vs. San Francisco, December 10, 1995 (Memorial Stadium, Clemson, South Carolina)
74,532 vs. Dallas, September 9, 2018 (Bank of America Stadium, Charlotte, North Carolina)

- Largest road attendance (single game): 93,262 at Dallas, October 3, 2021 (AT&T Stadium, Arlington, Texas)

== Notes ==
Notes

Footnotes
