= 2011 Carolina Panthers season =

NFL team season

- Owner: Jerry Richardson
- General manager: Marty Hurney
- Head coach: Ron Rivera
- Home stadium: Bank of America Stadium

Results
- Record: 6–10
- Division place: 3rd NFC South
- Playoffs: Did not qualify
- Pro Bowlers: WR Steve Smith; C Ryan Kalil; QB Cam Newton

The 2011 season was the Carolina Panthers' 17th in the National Football League (NFL) and their first under head coach Ron Rivera. In Week 16 of the 2010 season, the team clinched the NFL's worst record of that year and was given the #1 pick in the 2011 NFL draft, with which the team selected Auburn quarterback Cam Newton, the 2010 Heisman Trophy winner. They improved on their 2–14 record from 2010, and finished 6–10, missing the playoffs for the third year in a row.

Despite their losing record, Carolina made many improvements. According to Football Outsiders, the Panthers had the biggest year-to-year offensive improvement in their history: they were worst in 2010, and moved up to 4th offensively in 2011, according to Football Outsiders' statistical formulas. In addition, Football Outsiders states that Carolina had the best running game in their calculations' history. This was due to the addition of Cam Newton's running ability to the high-quality running tandem of running backs DeAngelo Williams and Jonathan Stewart. The rushing attack eclipsed that of the previous record holder, the 2000 St. Louis Rams. In the process, Carolina became the first team in NFL history to have three players with 700 or more yards rushing in the same season: Williams with 836 yards, Stewart with 761 yards, and Newton with 706 yards. The Panthers also set the team record for net yards with 6,237, breaking the record originally set by the 2004 team.

Carolina's defense, however, was ranked last in the league, according to Football Outsiders. They allowed the fifth-most total yards in the league on defense in 2011, and the sixth-most points. Their pass defense gave up 7.6 yards per pass attempt (tied for worst in the league), and their 6.2 yards allowed per play was tied for third-worst in the league.

== Offseason ==
=== Free Agency ===
Key Free Agent re-signings

- DE Charles Johnson: 6 years, $72 million, $30 million signing bonus.
- RB DeAngelo Williams: 5 years, $43 million, $21 million signing bonus.
- LB Jon Beason: 5 years, $50 million
- LB James Anderson: 5 years, $22 million, $8.5 million guaranteed.
- LB Thomas Davis: received a 5-year extension

Other Free Agents acquisitions

- K Olindo Mare (Seahawks): 3 years, $12 million, $4 million signing bonus.
- TE Ben Hartsock (Jets): 2 years, terms unknown
- TE Jeremy Shockey (Saints): 1 year, terms unknown
- WR Legedu Naanee (Chargers): 1 year, terms unknown
- LB Omar Gaither (Eagles): 1 year, term unknown
- TE Greg Olsen ( trade w/ Bears): 4 years, $24 million. Carolina traded a 2012 third round draft pick to acquire the tight end
- QB Derek Anderson (Cardinals): 1 year, terms unknown]

=== Draft ===
2011 Carolina Panthers draft
Round	Pick	Player	Position	College	Notes
1	1	Cam Newton *	Quarterback	Auburn	
3	65	Terrell McClain	Defensive tackle	South Florida	
3	97	Sione Fua	Defensive tackle	Stanford	Compensatory selection
4	98	Brandon Hogan	Cornerback	West Virginia	
5	132	Kealoha Pilares	Wide receiver	Hawaii	
6	166	Lawrence Wilson	Linebacker	Connecticut	
6	203	Zachary Williams	Center	Washington State	Compensatory selection
7	244	Lee Ziemba	Offensive tackle	Auburn	Compensatory selection
Made roster * Made at least one Pro Bowl during career

==== Draft Notes ====
- The Panthers traded its second-round selection (#33 overall) to the New England Patriots in exchange for a 2010 third round selection (#89 overall; used to select WR Armanti Edwards).
- Compensatory selection.
- The Panthers traded its original seventh-round selection (#204 overall) to the Green Bay Packers in exchange for long snapper J. J. Jansen.

== Staff ==
Carolina Panthers 2011 staff
Front office: Owner – Jerry Richardson; President – Danny Morrison; General manager – Marty Hurney; Director of football operations – Brandon Beane; Director of team administration – Rob Rogers; Football operations manager – Bryan Porter; Football operations assistant – Mike Anderson; Director of pro scouting – Mark Koncz; Director of college scouting – Don Gregory; National scout – Jeff Morrow; National scout – Mike Szabo; Director of player development – Mark Carrier; Executive assistant to the head coach – Linda O'Hora; Head coaches: Head coach – Ron Rivera; Offensive coaches: Offensive coordinator – Rob Chudzinski; Quarterbacks – Mike Shula; Running backs – John Settle; Wide receivers – Fred Graves; Tight ends – Pete Hoener; Offensive line – John Matsko; Assistant offensive line – Ray Brown; Offensive quality control – Scott Turner; Offensive consultant – Ricky Proehl	Defensive coaches: Defensive coordinator – Sean McDermott; Defensive line – Eric Washington; Linebackers – Warren Belin; Defensive backfield – Ron Meeks; Defensive quality control/assistant defensive line – Sam Mills III; Special teams coaches: Special teams coordinator – Brian Murphy; Administrative assistant to the coaching staff – Bobby Babich; Strength and conditioning: Strength and conditioning – Joe Kenn; Assistant strength and conditioning – Adam Feit

== Roster ==
2011 Carolina Panthers roster
Quarterbacks (QB): 3 Derek Anderson; 2 Jimmy Clausen; 1 Cam Newton; Running backs (RB): 47 Richie Brockel FB; 28 Jonathan Stewart; 32 Josh Vaughan; 34 DeAngelo Williams; Wide receivers (WR): 86 Darvin Adams; 19 Seyi Ajirotutu; 14 Armanti Edwards PR; 11 Brandon LaFell; 81 Kealoha Pilares KR; 89 Steve Smith (C); Tight ends (TE): 84 Ben Hartsock; 88 Greg Olsen; 80 Jeremy Shockey	Offensive linemen (OL): 77 Byron Bell T; 73 Mackenzy Bernadeau G; 62 Jeff Byers C; 69 Jordan Gross T (C); 63 Geoff Hangartner G; 67 Ryan Kalil C; 70 Travelle Wharton G; 75 Lee Ziemba T; Defensive linemen (DL): 93 Antwan Applewhite DE; 76 Greg Hardy DE; 95 Charles Johnson DE; 99 Frank Kearse DT; 68 Andre Neblett DT; 92 Eric Norwood DE; 78 Ogemdi Nwagbuo DT; 61 DeMario Pressley DT; 71 Jason Shirley DT	Linebackers (LB): 50 James Anderson OLB; 55 Dan Connor MLB; 59 Omar Gaither MLB; 98 Thomas Keiser OLB; 57 Jordan Senn OLB; 54 Jason Williams OLB; 91 Kion Wilson OLB; Defensive backs (DB): 27 Darius Butler CB; 20 Chris Gamble CB; 30 Charles Godfrey SS (C); 21 Brandon Hogan CB; 23 Sherrod Martin FS; 37 Jonathan Nelson FS; 29 Jordan Pugh S; 25 R. J. Stanford CB; 22 Josh Thomas CB; Special teams (ST): 7 Jason Baker P (C); 5 Adi Kunalic K; 10 Olindo Mare K; 44 J. J. Jansen LS	Practice squad: 66 Roger Allen G/T; 72 Garrett Chisolm G; 46 Phillip Dillard LB; 24 Kory Sheets RB; 85 Greg Smith TE; 36 Reggie Sullivan CB; 35 Chip Vaughn S; Reserve: 82 Gary Barnidge TE (IR); 52 Jon Beason MLB (IR) (C); 60 Bryant Browning T/G (IR); 58 Thomas Davis OLB (IR) (C); 96 Ron Edwards DT (IR); 94 Sione Fua DT (IR); 12 David Gettis WR (IR); 33 Mike Goodson RB (IR); 25 Cletis Gordon CB (IR); 97 Terrell McClain DT (IR); 41 Captain Munnerlyn CB (IR); 17 Legedu Naanee WR (IR); 79 Jeff Otah T (IR); 53 Jason Phillips MLB (IR); 74 Geoff Schwartz T (IR); 65 Garry Williams T (IR); 56 Thomas Williams MLB (IR); 64 Zack Williams G (IR); Rookies in italics 53 active, 18 reserve, 7 practice squad

== Preseason ==
Week	Date	Opponent	Result	Record	Venue	Recap
1	August 13	New York Giants	W 20–10	1–0	Bank of America Stadium	Recap
2	August 19	at Miami Dolphins	L 10–20	1–1	Sun Life Stadium	Recap
3	August 25	at Cincinnati Bengals	L 13–24	1–2	Paul Brown Stadium	Recap
4	September 1	Pittsburgh Steelers	L 17–33	1–3	Bank of America Stadium	Recap

== Regular season ==
Week	Date	Opponent	Result	Record	Venue	Recap
1	September 11	at Arizona Cardinals	**L** 21–28	0–1	University of Phoenix Stadium	Recap
2	September 18	Green Bay Packers	**L** 23–30	0–2	Bank of America Stadium	Recap
3	September 25	Jacksonville Jaguars	**W** 16–10	1–2	Bank of America Stadium	Recap
4	October 2	at Chicago Bears	**L** 29–34	1–3	Soldier Field	Recap
5	October 9	**New Orleans Saints**	**L** 27–30	1–4	Bank of America Stadium	Recap
6	October 16	at **Atlanta Falcons**	**L** 17–31	1–5	Georgia Dome	Recap
7	October 23	Washington Redskins	**W** 33–20	2–5	Bank of America Stadium	Recap
8	October 30	Minnesota Vikings	**L** 21–24	2–6	Bank of America Stadium	Recap
9	Bye					
10	November 13	Tennessee Titans	**L** 3–30	2–7	Bank of America Stadium	Recap
11	November 20	at Detroit Lions	**L** 35–49	2–8	Ford Field	Recap
12	November 27	at Indianapolis Colts	**W** 27–19	3–8	Lucas Oil Stadium	Recap
13	December 4	at **Tampa Bay Buccaneers**	**W** 38–19	4–8	Raymond James Stadium	Recap
14	December 11	**Atlanta Falcons**	**L** 23–31	4–9	Bank of America Stadium	Recap
15	December 18	at Houston Texans	**W** 28–13	5–9	Reliant Stadium	Recap
16	December 24	**Tampa Bay Buccaneers**	**W** 48–16	6–9	Bank of America Stadium	Recap
17	January 1	at **New Orleans Saints**	**L** 17–45	6–10	Mercedes-Benz Superdome	Recap

Note: Intra-division opponents are in bold text.

== Season summary ==
=== Week 1 at Cardinals ===
Week One: Carolina Panthers (0–0) at Arizona Cardinals (0–0)

Quarter	1	2	3	4	Total
Panthers	7	7	7	0	21
Cardinals	7	0	7	14	28

at University of Phoenix Stadium • Glendale, Arizona

- Date: September 11
- Game time: 1:15 p.m. MDT
- Game weather: Indoors (roof closed)
- Game attendance: 60,627
- Referee: Carl Cheffers
- TV announcers (Fox): Sam Rosen, Chad Pennington, and Jody Jackson
- Gamebook

Game information

Panthers

- Cam Newton
  24/37, 422 Yds, 2 TD, INT
- DeAngelo Williams
  12 Rush, 30 Yds
- Steve Smith
  8 Rec, 178 Yds, 2 TD

Cardinals

- Kevin Kolb
  18/27, 309 Yds, 2 TD
- Chris Wells
  18 Rush, 90 Yds, TD
- Early Doucet
  3 Rec, 105 Yds, TD

Scoring summary

Quarter	Time	Drive			Team	Scoring information	Score	
Quarter	Time	Plays	Yards	TOP	Team	Scoring information	CAR	ARI
1	8:45	6	54	3:42	Cardinals	Chris Wells 7-yard touchdown run, Jay Feely kick good	0	7
1	7:11	3	80	1:34	Panthers	Steve Smith 77-yard touchdown reception from Cam Newton, Olindo Mare kick good	7	7
2	0:06	4	74	0:57	Panthers	Steve Smith 26-yard touchdown reception from Cam Newton, Olindo Mare kick good	14	7
3	10:40	1	48	0:12	Cardinals	Jeff King 48-yard touchdown reception from Kevin Kolb, Jay Feely kick good	14	14
3	5:49	8	80	4:51	Panthers	Cam Newton 1-yard touchdown run, Olindo Mare kick good	21	14
4	10:48	5	90	2:13	Cardinals	Early Doucet 70-yard touchdown reception from Kevin Kolb, Jay Feely kick good	21	21
4	7:15				Cardinals	Punt returned 89 yards for touchdown by Patrick Peterson, Jay Feely kick good	21	28
"TOP" = time of possession. For other American football terms, see Glossary of American football.							21	28

The Panthers opened up their regular season on the road against the Cardinals. Cam Newton came into the game amid numerous questions and after a mixed-performance 1–3 preseason. Newton surprisingly threw for 422 pass yards, an NFL record for a rookie in his first start. The Panthers came into the 3rd quarter leading 14–7, Newton having thrown 2 touchdown passes, each to Steve Smith. The Panthers came into the 4th quarter tied at 21. On a 4th & 13 at the Cardinals 47-yard line, the Panthers were forced to punt. Patrick Peterson returned the ball into the endzone for an 89-yard touchdown return. With 1:19 left, 4th and 5, at the Cardinals 6-yard line, game on the line, Cam Newton threw a short 4-yard pass to Mike Goodson which wasn't enough for the Panthers despite an amazing debut by Panthers rookie QB Cam Newton. With the loss the Panthers fell to 0–1 and lost their 3rd consecutive regular season opener.

=== Week 2 ===
Green Bay Packers at Carolina Panthers

Team	1	2	3	4	Total
• Packers	0	7	16	7	30
Panthers	10	3	0	10	23

- Date: September 18
- Location: Bank of America Stadium, Charlotte, North Carolina
- Game start: 1:00 p.m. EST
- Game attendance: 73,167
- Game weather: 64 °F (18 °C), Cloudy
- Referee: Alberto Riveron
- TV announcers (Fox): Ron Pitts and Jim Mora

The Panthers' first home game of the season was a duel against the defending super bowl champions, the Green Bay Packers. Cam Newton threw for once again another 400+ yard game, becoming the first rookie ever to do so and only the 6th quarterback in NFL history to accomplish such a feat. Newton picked up where he left off against the Cardinals with an early score with 9:26 left in the 1st quarter of the game. The Panthers led 13–7 at halftime, stunning the defending Super Bowl champions. However, Green Bay came back when Aaron Rodgers threw a 49-yard touchdown pass to a wide-open Greg Jennings to put the Packers up 14–13. A big game-changer was when there was 9:31 left in the 3rd quarter of the game. Cam Newton found Steve Smith, but Smith fumbled the football and Charles Woodson picked it up. Another big game changer was on a 4th and 4 at the Packers 6-yard line with 3:23 left in the game, score being 23–16 Packers, Cam Newton tried to scramble for the first down, but was 2 yards shy. The Packers won the game, 30–23, a much closer game than expected, but the Panthers still fell to 0–2 on the season.

=== Week 3 ===
Jacksonville Jaguars at Carolina Panthers

Team	1	2	3	4	Total
Jaguars	0	10	0	0	10
• Panthers	2	3	3	8	16

- Date: September 25
- Location: Bank of America Stadium, Charlotte, North Carolina
- Game start: 1:00 p.m. EST
- Game attendance: 71,704
- Game weather: 74 °F (23 °C), Heavy Rain
- Referee: Bill Leavy
- TV announcers (CBS): Spero Dedes and Steve Beuerlein

Scoring summary
1	7:33	CAR	Safety, Blaine Gabbert tackled by Greg Hardy in end zone	Panthers 2–0
2	14:12	CAR	Olindo Mare 42 yard field goal	Panthers 5–0
2	7:41	JAC	Josh Scobee 53 yard field goal	Panthers 5–3
2	:00	JAC	Mike Thomas 36 yard pass from Blaine Gabbert (Josh Scobee kick)	Jaguars 10–5
3	2:24	CAR	Olindo Mare 32 yard field goal	Jaguars 10–8
4	4:20	CAR	Greg Olsen 16 yard pass from Cam Newton (Greg Olsen pass from Cam Newton)	Panthers 16–10

The Panthers came into Week 3 in need of a win in order to save their season. This game was against the Jacksonville Jaguars, who had gone 8–8 last season and were 1–1 to start the season in 2011. The Jaguars benched Luke McCown and started rookie Blaine Gabbert after McCown's disastrous four interceptions in a devastating 32–3 loss to the New York Jets. The Panthers started the game by sacking Gabbert and getting a safety, to lead 2–0.

With the score 5–3, one of the more memorable moments during the season occurred. A heavy rain started coming down, blanketing the stadium and flooding the concrete decks. Players slipped and slid all over the place, with water going everywhere. Most dramatically, the excess water on the stadium's upper deck poured onto the lower deck which poured onto the field. Although the field had a drainage system, it was not designed for such an amount of water at once. Moments later, a Gabbert pass was picked off by Carolina's Sherrod Martin. However, for those watching the game on TV it was difficult to tell who picked the pass off or where he was. The reason was CBS' main camera feed was covered with so many raindrops that identifying specific players on the field was nearly impossible. Viewers, therefore, had to rely on the call from play-by-play announcer Spero Dedes as to what was happening on the play. Subsequent replays gave them a clearer picture. With 0:06 left in the 1st half, Gabbert threw a 36-yard touchdown pass to Mike Thomas which was both the first career touchdown pass by Gabbert and the first touchdown pass for the Jaguars in the 2011 season. Jacksonville went up 10–5 at halftime; however, Carolina came back.

With 6:05 left in the 4th quarter, and the rain not coming down anymore although the field, players, and fans were still soaked, Cam Newton found Steve Smith for a gain of 13 yards. With 4:27 left, on a 3rd and 2, Newton found his new tight end, Greg Olsen, for a 16-yard touchdown pass to put the Panthers up 14–10. They made the 2-point conversion which put them ahead 16–10. Then, at the Panthers 35-yard line, with 0:06 remaining on the game clock, on the last play of the game, Gabbert's pass was tipped and incomplete. Not only was it the Panthers' first win of the season, it was also the first time since 2008 that they defeated an AFC team as well as the first time they won a game in September. The win put them at 1–2.

=== Week 4 ===
Carolina Panthers at Chicago Bears

Team	1	2	3	4	Total
Panthers	3	17	0	9	29
• Bears	10	14	0	10	34

- Date: October 2
- Location: Soldier Field, Chicago, Illinois
- Game start: 1:00 p.m. EST
- Game attendance: 62,135
- Game weather: 60 °F (16 °C), Sunny
- Referee: Terry McAulay
- TV announcers (Fox): Thom Brennaman, Brian Billick, and Laura Okmin

In order to keep their season alive, the Panthers were in need of a win against the Bears for their first 2–2 or above start since 2008. Cam Newton threw for another 374 pass yards, his highest game total for the season. Things started rough for the Panthers when Newton threw a pass to D.J. Moore which was taken back the other way for a Chicago Bears touchdown that put the Bears ahead, 10–3. With the Panthers trailing 17–10, on a 4th and 5, forced to punt, Devin Hester beat the Panthers special teams' for a 69-yard punt return, which broke the NFL record for punt return touchdowns (11). At halftime, the Panthers were trailing 24–20. The third quarter was scoreless. But in the fourth quarter, with 14:17 remaining, Jay Cutler threw a pass to Charles Godfrey for an interception which the Panthers converted into a field goal. With 1:55 left on the game clock, Panthers trailing by 1, 23–24, on a fourth-and-10 at their own 42, Cam Newton threw a deep pass to Legedu Naanee which was incomplete. Matt Forte sealed the Bears' victory on the very next play from the Bears' 43 when he ran for 40 yards down to the Panthers' 3. The Bears won, 34–29. Newton was nominated for the Pepsi Rookie Of The Week awards. With the loss, the Panthers fell to 1–3.

=== Week 5 ===
New Orleans Saints at Carolina Panthers

Team	1	2	3	4	Total
• Saints	10	10	3	7	30
Panthers	6	7	7	7	27

- Date: October 9
- Location: Bank of America Stadium, Charlotte, North Carolina
- Game start: 1:00 p.m. EST
- Game attendance: 72,679
- Game weather: 68 °F (20 °C), Cloudy
- Referee: John Parry
- TV announcers (Fox): Dick Stockton and John Lynch

Scoring summary
1	13:50	NO	Jed Collins 1 yard pass from Drew Brees (John Kasay kick)	Saints 7–0
1	6:15	NO	John Kasay 23 yard field goal	Saints 10–0
1	2:52	CAR	Steve Smith 54 yard pass from Cam Newton (kick blocked)	Saints 10–6
2	5:27	NO	Mark Ingram II 1 yard run (John Kasay kick)	Saints 17–6
2	3:47	CAR	DeAngelo Williams 69 yard run (Olindo Mare kick)	Saints 17–13
2	:00	NO	John Kasay 46 yard field goal	Saints 20–13
3	10:47	NO	John Kasay 37 yard field goal	Saints 23–13
3	3:43	CAR	Cam Newton 1 yard run (Olindo Mare kick)	Saints 23–20
4	12:32	CAR	Greg Olsen 5 yard pass from Cam Newton (Olindo Mare kick)	Panthers 27–23
4	:50	NO	Pierre Thomas 6 yard run from Drew Brees (John Kasay kick)	Saints 30–27

The Panthers came into Week 5 again craving a win to get their season back on track. This time they were facing the former super bowl champions, the New Orleans Saints. The Saints were leading 10–0 with 3:04 left in the first quarter when Cam Newton threw a pass to wide receiver Steve Smith for a 54-yard touchdown after the touchdown Roman Harper was called for unnecessary roughness in the endzone. There was a short fight after the play, and Olindo Mare extra point try was blocked. With 4:01 left in the second quarter, the Panthers were trailing 17–6. Not when DeAngelo Williams took a left pitch from Cam Newton for a 69-yard score, Williams' first touchdown since 2009. Right before halftime, with 0:10 left, Sean Payton was trying to get the field goal unit out on the field for a John Kasay 46-yard field goal. Ron Rivera took a timeout because he thought he had too many men on the field, which cost them a field goal which put the Saints up, 20–13. With 2:36 left in the third quarter, on a 2nd and 8, score 23–20 Saints, Drew Brees was intercepted by Sherrod Martin. Off of the interception, with 12:40 left in the game, on a 3rd and goal, Newton found Greg Olsen for a 5-yard touchdown to put the Panthers up 27–23. With 0:56 left in the game, Brees threw a short pass to Pierre Thomas for a six-yard score. Saints go up, 30–27. With 0:27 left, on a fourth-and-10, Cam Newton's pass is incomplete, intended for Greg Olsen, but there was a pass interference call on Roman Harper which set up a Panthers first down. Then, on a 3rd and 12 with 0:05 remaining, Cam Newton's pass, intended for Steve Smith is incomplete. With the close loss the Panthers fell to 1–4 on the season, though only being outscored 119–132 on the season.

=== Week 6 ===
Carolina Panthers at Atlanta Falcons

Team	1	2	3	4	Total
Panthers	3	7	7	0	17
• Falcons	7	7	0	17	31

- Date: October 16
- Location: Georgia Dome, Atlanta, Georgia
- Game start: 1:00 p.m. EST
- Game attendance: 69,047
- Game weather: indoors (dome)
- Referee: Pete Morelli
- TV announcers (Fox): Dick Stockton and John Lynch

With the loss, the Panthers fell to 1–5.

=== Week 7 ===
Washington Redskins at Carolina Panthers

Team	1	2	3	4	Total
Redskins	0	6	7	7	20
• Panthers	3	6	14	10	33

- Date: October 23
- Location: Bank of America Stadium, Charlotte, North Carolina
- Game start: 1:00 p.m. EST
- Game attendance: 73,245
- Game weather: 62 °F (17 °C), Sunny
- Referee: Jerome Boger
- TV announcers (Fox): Chris Myers and Tim Ryan

The Panthers came into this game with a 1–5 record, hoping to come back and fight to stay in the race for the playoffs. The Panthers held the lead just about the whole game as Cam Newton had 256 passing yards (& tied Vince Young's record for Most Rush TD by QB in Single Season for a rookie) for a Carolina win. With the win, the Panthers rose to 2–5.

=== Week 8 ===
Minnesota Vikings at Carolina Panthers

Team	1	2	3	4	Total
• Vikings	7	7	7	3	24
Panthers	0	14	7	0	21

- Date: October 30
- Location: Bank of America Stadium, Charlotte, North Carolina
- Game start: 1:00 p.m. EST
- Game attendance: 72,095
- Game weather: 54 °F (12 °C), Sunny
- Referee: Ed Hochuli
- TV announcers (Fox): Kenny Albert, Daryl Johnston, and Tony Siragusa

The Panthers almost sent the game to overtime, however, Olindo Mare missed a 31-yard field goal. With the loss, the Panthers fell to 2–6 heading into their bye week.

=== Week 10 ===
Tennessee Titans at Carolina Panthers

Team	1	2	3	4	Total
• Titans	14	3	3	10	30
Panthers	0	0	0	3	3

- Date: November 13
- Location: Bank of America Stadium, Charlotte, North Carolina
- Game start: 1:00 p.m. EST
- Game attendance: 72,409
- Game weather: 57 °F (14 °C), Cloudy
- Referee: Walt Coleman
- TV announcers (CBS): Kevin Harlan and Solomon Wilcots

With the loss, the Panthers fell to 2–7.

=== Week 11 ===
Carolina Panthers at Detroit Lions

Team	1	2	3	4	Total
Panthers	10	17	0	8	35
• Lions	0	14	14	21	49

- Date: November 20
- Location: Ford Field, Detroit, Michigan
- Game start: 1:00 p.m. EST
- Game attendance: 63,633
- Game weather: indoors (dome)
- Referee: Gene Steratore
- TV announcers (Fox): Dick Stockton, John Lynch, and Jennifer Hale

Scoring summary
1	3:55	CAR	Olindo Mare 27 yard field goal	Panthers 3–0
1	:35	CAR	Steve Smith 15 yard pass from Cam Newton (Olindo Mare kick)	Panthers 10–0
2	14:04	DET	Kevin Smith 28 yard pass from Matthew Stafford (Jason Hanson kick)	Panthers 10–7
2	13:50	CAR	Kealoha Pilares 101 yard kickoff return (Olindo Mare kick)	Panthers 17–7
2	9:32	CAR	Cam Newton 11 yard run (Olindo Mare kick)	Panthers 24–7
2	2:57	DET	Titus Young 3 yard pass from Matthew Stafford (Jason Hanson kick)	Panthers 24–14
2	:00	CAR	Olindo Mare 31 yard field goal	Panthers 27–14
3	10:28	DET	Nate Burleson 16 yard pass from Matthew Stafford (Jason Hanson kick)	Panthers 27–21
3	5:57	DET	Tony Scheffler 17 yard pass from Matthew Stafford (Jason Hanson kick)	Lions 28–27
4	8:02	DET	Kevin Smith 4 yard run (Jason Hanson kick)	Lions 35–27
4	4:59	CAR	Cam Newton 4 yard run (Steve Smith pass from Cam Newton)	Tie 35–35
4	2:32	DET	Brandon Pettigrew 7 yard pass from Matthew Stafford (Jason Hanson kick)	Lions 42–35
4	2:00	DET	Kevin Smith 19 yard run (Jason Hanson kick)	Lions 49–35

With the surprising loss, the Panthers fell to 2–8 but Cam Newton broke Vince Young's record for Most Rush TD by QB in Single Season by a rookie.

=== Week 12 ===
Carolina Panthers at Indianapolis Colts

Team	1	2	3	4	Total
• Panthers	3	7	7	10	27
Colts	0	10	3	6	19

- Date: November 27
- Location: Lucas Oil Stadium, Indianapolis, Indiana
- Game start: 1:00 p.m. EST
- Game attendance: 63,928
- Game weather: indoors (roof closed)
- Referee: Tony Corrente
- TV announcers (Fox): Chris Myers, Tim Ryan, and Jaime Maggio

With the win, the Panthers improved to 3–8 and secured the Colts' 0–4 record against the NFC.

=== Week 13 ===
Carolina Panthers at Tampa Bay Buccaneers

Team	1	2	3	4	Total
• Panthers	14	10	7	7	38
Buccaneers	3	9	0	7	19

- Date: December 4
- Location: Raymond James Stadium, Tampa, Florida
- Game start: 1:00 p.m. EST
- Game attendance: 56,270
- Game weather: 79 °F (26 °C), Cloudy
- Referee: Gene Steratore
- TV announcers (Fox): Ron Pitts, Jim Mora, and Drea Avent

Cam Newton broke Steve Grogan's record for Most Rush TD by QB in Single Season (a record that stood for 35 years). With the win, the Panthers improved to 4–8.

=== Week 14 ===
Atlanta Falcons at Carolina Panthers

Team	1	2	3	4	Total
• Falcons	7	0	10	14	31
Panthers	7	16	0	0	23

- Date: December 11
- Location: Bank of America Stadium, Charlotte, North Carolina
- Game start: 1:00 p.m. EST
- Game attendance: 72,680
- Game weather: 43 °F (6 °C), Sunny
- Referee: Walt Anderson
- TV announcers (Fox): Ron Pitts, Jim Mora, and Drea Avent

Scoring summary
1	5:29	ATL	Roddy White 5 yard pass from Matt Ryan (Matt Bryant kick)	Falcons 7–0
1	:03	CAR	Jeremy Shockey 6 yard pass from Cam Newton (Olindo Mare kick)	Tie 7–7
2	7:12	CAR	Safety, Matt Ryan tackled by Antwan Applewhite in end zone	Panthers 9–7
2	6:51	CAR	DeAngelo Williams 74 yard run (Olindo Mare kick)	Panthers 16–7
2	3:03	CAR	Greg Olsen 44 yard pass from Cam Newton (Olindo Mare kick)	Panthers 23–7
3	10:55	ATL	Matt Bryant 30 yard field goal	Panthers 23–10
3	8:55	ATL	Jacquizz Rodgers 31 yard pass from Matt Ryan (Matt Bryant kick)	Panthers 23–17
4	12:42	ATL	Julio Jones 17 yard pass from Matt Ryan (Matt Bryant kick)	Falcons 24–23
4	4:17	ATL	Julio Jones 75 yard pass from Matt Ryan (Matt Bryant kick)	Falcons 31–23

With their 4th straight loss to the Falcons, the Panthers fell to 4–9 securing them their second consecutive losing season.

=== Week 15 ===
Carolina Panthers at Houston Texans

Team	1	2	3	4	Total
• Panthers	7	14	0	7	28
Texans	0	0	6	7	13

- Date: December 18
- Location: Reliant Stadium, Houston, Texas
- Game start: 1:00 p.m. EST
- Game attendance: 71,540
- Game weather: indoors (roof closed)
- Referee: Jeff Triplette
- TV announcers (Fox): Ron Pitts, Jim Mora, and Drea Avent

With the win, the Panthers improved to 5–9. Also it was the first time in franchise history they defeated the Texans.

=== Week 16 ===
Tampa Bay Buccaneers at Carolina Panthers

Team	1	2	3	4	Total
Buccaneers	0	10	0	6	16
• Panthers	10	10	21	7	48

- Date: December 24
- Location: Bank of America Stadium, Charlotte, North Carolina
- Game start: 1:00 p.m. EST
- Game attendance: 70,363
- Game weather: 51 °F (11 °C), Partly Cloudy
- Referee: Carl Cheffers
- TV announcers (Fox): Sam Rosen, Chad Pennington, and Jody Jackson

Scoring summary
1	10:12	CAR	DeAngelo Williams 8 yard run (Olindo Mare kick)	Panthers 7–0
1	8:27	CAR	Olindo Mare 21 yard field goal	Panthers 10–0
2	14:07	TB	Arrelious Benn 4 yard pass from Josh Freeman (Connor Barth kick)	Panthers 10–7
2	13:06	CAR	Brandon LaFell 91 yard pass from Cam Newton (Olindo Mare kick)	Panthers 17–7
2	5:33	TB	Connor Barth 42 yard field goal	Panthers 17–10
2	:25	CAR	Olindo Mare 19 yard field goal	Panthers 20–10
3	11:55	CAR	DeAngelo Williams 22 yard run (Olindo Mare kick)	Panthers 27–10
3	3:24	CAR	Jonathan Stewart 11 yard pass from Cam Newton (Olindo Mare kick)	Panthers 34–10
3	:24	CAR	Cam Newton 49 yard run (Olindo Mare kick)	Panthers 41–10
4	14:53	CAR	Jeremy Shockey 8 yard pass from Cam Newton (Olindo Mare kick)	Panthers 48–10
4	11:08	TB	Josh Freeman 1 yard run (pass failed)	Panthers 48–16

With the win, the Panthers improved to 6–9 and swept the Buccaneers.

=== Week 17 ===
Carolina Panthers at New Orleans Saints

Team	1	2	3	4	Total
Panthers	7	10	0	0	17
• Saints	14	10	14	7	45

- Date: January 1
- Location: Mercedes-Benz Superdome, New Orleans, Louisiana
- Game start: 1:00 p.m. EST
- Game attendance: 73,065
- Game weather: indoors (dome)
- Referee: Ed Hochuli
- TV announcers (Fox): Joe Buck, Troy Aikman, and Pam Oliver

The Panthers lost to the Saints, 45–17, dropping their record to 6–10, instead of the hopeful 7–9. This was still an improvement from their 2–14 record last season. The Panthers were 6–0 when Cam Newton did not have any turnovers.

== Standings ==
NFC South
	W	L	T	PCT	DIV	CONF	PF	PA	STK
^{(3)} New Orleans Saints	13	3	0	.813	5–1	9–3	547	339	W8
^{(5)} Atlanta Falcons	10	6	0	.625	3–3	7–5	402	350	W1
Carolina Panthers	6	10	0	.375	2–4	3–9	406	429	L1
Tampa Bay Buccaneers	4	12	0	.250	2–4	3–9	287	494	L10
