= Captain Munnerlyn =

American football player (born 1988)

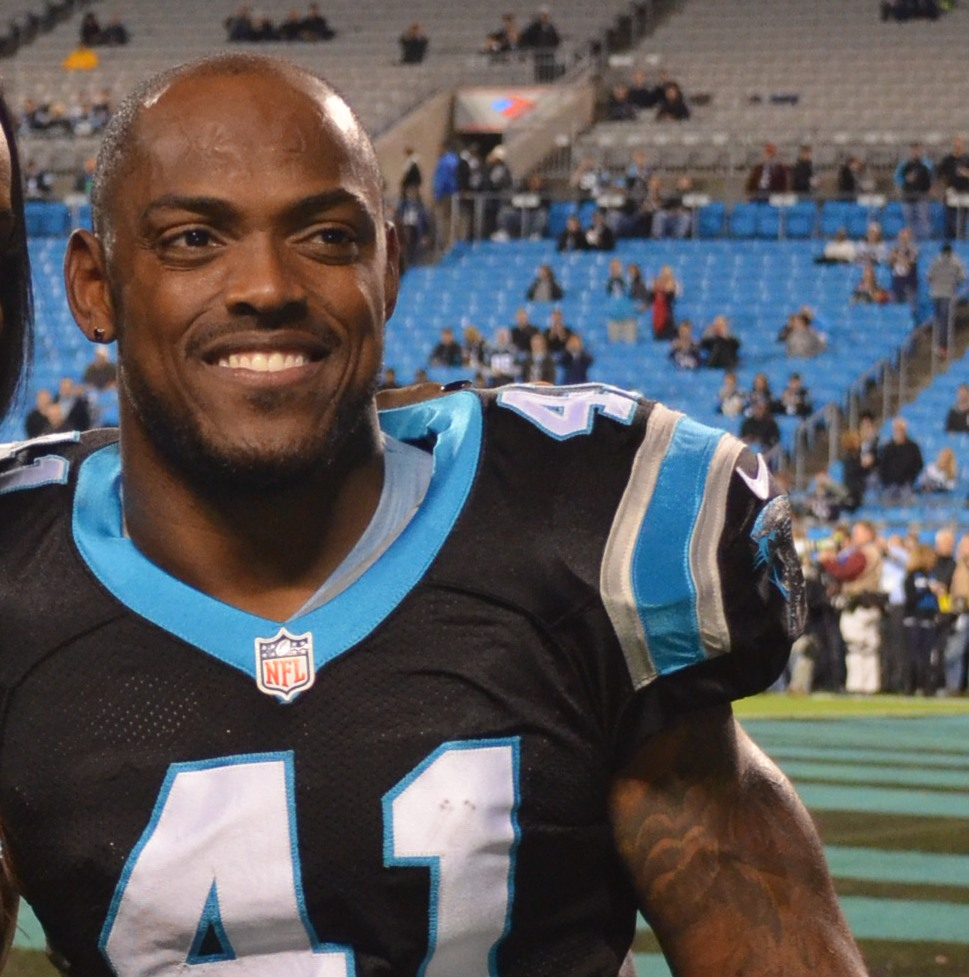
- Munnerlyn with the Carolina Panthers in 2013

Columbus Aviators
- Title: Defensive coordinator

Personal information
- Born: April 10, 1988 (age 38); Mobile, Alabama, U.S.
- Listed height: 5 ft 9 in (1.75 m)
- Listed weight: 195 lb (88 kg)

Career information
- Position: Cornerback (No. 41, 24)
- High school: Murphy (Mobile, Alabama)
- College: South Carolina (2006–2008)
- NFL draft: 2009: 7th round, 216th overall pick

Career history

Playing
- Carolina Panthers (2009–2013); Minnesota Vikings (2014–2016); Carolina Panthers (2017–2018); Buffalo Bills (2019)*
- * Offseason or practice squad member only

Coaching
- Myers Park HS (2023–2024) Assistant coach; Chambers HS (2025) Head coach; Columbus Aviators (2026–present) Defensive coordinator

Awards and highlights
- First-team All-SEC (2007)

Career NFL statistics
- Total tackles: 529
- Sacks: 10.5
- Forced fumbles: 5
- Pass deflections: 64
- Interceptions: 12
- Defensive touchdowns: 6
- Stats at Pro Football Reference

Captain Munnerlyn (born April 10, 1988) is an American former professional football player who was a cornerback in the National Football League (NFL). He is currently the defensive coordinator for the Columbus Aviators of the United Football League (UFL). He played college football for the South Carolina Gamecocks for three years. He was selected by the Carolina Panthers in the seventh round of the 2009 NFL draft. Munnerlyn also played for the Minnesota Vikings.

Munnerlyn played high school football at Murphy High School in Mobile, Alabama, where he was named All-region three times. Following high school, he chose to play college football for the South Carolina Gamecocks after receiving scholarship offers from two other teams. As a freshman in 2006, he played in 11 games and recorded a season high five tackles in two. In 2007, Munnerlyn was both a nickel back and return specialist for the Gamecocks. Following the season, he was named All–Southeastern Conference (SEC). In 2008, he was elevated to starting cornerback while also returning kicks and punts. Against Kentucky, he returned a kickoff 84 yards and a blocked field goal 81 yards. On the second day of the 2009 NFL draft, Munnerlyn was selected by the Carolina Panthers in the seventh round (216th overall).

== Early life ==
Captain was born three months premature and at birth weighed three pounds, eight ounces. He grew up in Happy Hills, which was a crime-infested part of Mobile. While living there, he attended the Josephine Allen branch of Boys & Girls Clubs of South Alabama.

When he was growing up, his father was murdered and both of his brothers sold drugs. His oldest brother, Timothy, was convicted in 1996 of murder and was sentenced to life in prison. After the shooting, Munnerlyn's mother converted to Christianity and he eventually did the same. Munnerlyn eventually said of the conversion and his mother's prayers that he would stay out of trouble, "Without her prayers, I don't think I could be here in the NFL right now".

Munnerlyn attended Murphy High School in Mobile, Alabama, where he starred in both football and track. In football, he was a three-time All-region selection and participated in the Junior All–Star Game. He helped lead Murphy High School to a 10–2 record and a 6A Regional runner-up finish his senior year, earning a spot on the Alabama Sports Writers Association All-State team. He graduated from Murphy in 2006.

During high school, Munnerlyn was also a standout track & field sprinter. He competed in the 100-meter dash and long jump at the 2004 Junior Olympics. In 2006, he earned a second-place finish in the long jump event at the AHSAA State T&F Meet, recording a career-best leap of 6.85 meters (22 ft, 4.75 in). He clocked personal-best times of 10.53 seconds in the 100-meter dash and 22.39 seconds in the 200-meter dash as a senior.

== College career ==
After his high school career, Munnerlyn was recruited by South Carolina, West Virginia, and Kansas State. He chose South Carolina on January 13, 2006.

As a freshman in 2006, Munnerlyn was not redshirted and played in 12 games. He missed one game due to an infection in his forearm. For the 2006 season, he recorded 36 tackles with his season high of five coming against Tennessee and Houston. Munnerlyn also recorded two interceptions and five pass deflections.

In 2007, as a sophomore, Munnerlyn split time at cornerback and kick returner and was called a "shut down corner" on Rivals.com. Against Vanderbilt, to whom South Carolina lost 17–6, Munnerlyn returned a punt 46 yards and also forced a fumble. In the same game, South Carolina wide receiver Kenny McKinley fielded a punt and flipped it to Munnerlyn who gained eight yards. Following the season, he was named a first–team All-SEC.

In week 6 of the 2008 season, head coach Steve Spurrier benched Munnerlyn for the first series of the game against Ole Miss due to Munnerlyn missing class and team weightlifting sessions. Against Kentucky, Munnerlyn returned a kickoff 84 yards before being tackled on the 16 yard line. On the next play quarterback Stephen Garcia completed a touchdown pass to Kenny McKinley. In the same game, Munnerlyn returned a blocked field goal for an 81-yard touchdown.

Munnerlyn declared for the NFL draft following the 2008 season. Munnerlyn played in 36 games with 28 starts for the Gamecocks. He finished his collegiate career with 127 tackles, two sacks, five interceptions, 19 passes defensed, two forced fumbles, and three fumble recoveries. He also returned 33 kickoffs for 754 yards (22.8 ypa) and 37 punts for 283 yards (7.6 ypa).

=== Statistics ===
| Regular season statistics | | | | Tackles | | | | | Interceptions | | | | | | Fumbles | | |
| Season | Team | GP | GS | Comb | Total | Ast | Sck | Tfl | PDef | Int | Yds | Avg | Lng | TDs | FF | FR | FR YDS |
|---|---|---|---|---|---|---|---|---|---|---|---|---|---|---|---|---|---|
| 2006 | South Carolina | 12 | 5 | 36 | 27 | 9 | 0.0 | 0.0 | 7 | 2 | 1 | 0.5 | 1 | 0 | 0 | 0 | 0 |
| 2007 | South Carolina | 11 | 10 | 47 | 40 | 7 | 0.0 | 2.0 | 5 | 3 | 38 | 12.7 | 16 | 0 | 1 | 1 | 0 |
| 2008 | South Carolina | 13 | 13 | 44 | 29 | 15 | 2.0 | 3.0 | 5 | 0 | 0 | 0.0 | 0 | 0 | 1 | 2 | 0 |
| Totals | | 36 | 28 | 127 | 96 | 31 | 2.0 | 5.0 | 19 | 5 | 39 | 7.8 | 16 | 0 | 2 | 3 | 0 |

== Professional career ==
Pre-draft measurables
| Height | Weight | Arm length | Hand span | 40-yard dash | 10-yard split | 20-yard split | 20-yard shuttle | Three-cone drill | Vertical jump | Broad jump | Bench press |
|---|---|---|---|---|---|---|---|---|---|---|---|
| 5 ft 8 1/2 in (1.74 m) | 182 lb (83 kg) | 31 in (0.79 m) | 8 1/2 in (0.22 m) | 4.41 s | 1.48 s | 2.55 s | 4.04 s | 7.05 s | 37.5 in (0.95 m) | 10 ft 1 in (3.07 m) | 19 reps |
All values from NFL Combine and Pro Day

=== Carolina Panthers (first stint) ===
==== 2009 ====
Munnerlyn was selected by the Carolina Panthers in the seventh round (216th overall) of the 2009 NFL draft. Munnerlyn called being drafted by the Panthers, "exciting, because I played college ball at South Carolina, and that's only like an hour away. It was exciting to hear my name get called. I'm ready for it, ready to take my game to the next level." Munnerlyn holds the Panthers career interception return touchdown record with 5 touchdowns and is tied for the club's single-season record with 2, a feat he achieved in both 2012 and 2013 seasons, the only Panthers player to have multiple interception return scores in a season twice. The 5 interception touchdowns ranked second in the NFL from 2010 to 2014.

In the 2009 preseason, Munnerlyn was competing with wide receiver Ryne Robinson for the punt returner job. In the Panthers second preseason game against the Miami Dolphins, Munnerlyn returned a punt 58 yards and also fumbled one but recovered it, while Robinson fumbled a punt which the Dolphins recovered. He eventually won the punt return job as well as the primary nickel cornerback spot beating out C. J. Wilson and Sherrod Martin (who was selected 157 picks before Munnerlyn) by the end of September. On November 29, Munnerlyn suffered a concussion against the New York Jets but said days later that he planned on playing in the next game despite the NFL's changing of the concussion policy. Munnerlyn did not play the following week's game against the Buccaneers as he was inactive but returned the next week to play against the 8-5 New England Patriots; in the game, he recovered a fumble by running back Sammy Morris. In a Week 16 game at the New York Giants, he forced a fumble by quarterback Eli Manning on the last play of the first half. Munnerlyn completed his first season as a Panther playing in 15 games total with four starts, posting 43 tackles, one forced fumble, one fumble recovery and two passes defensed as the Panthers defense finished fourth in the NFL in pass defense, eighth in total defense and ninth in scoring defense and recorded 18 takeaways in the final six games of the season. The Panthers ended up finishing third in the NFC South with a 8–8 record. On special teams, Munnerlyn also averaged 9.0 yards on 31 punt returns with a long of 37 yards, returned one kickoff for 15 yards and was credited with four special teams tackles.

==== 2010 ====
For his second season, Munnerlyn moved up to starting right cornerback after Richard Marshall was not re-signed. In Week 3 against the Cincinnati Bengals, he snagged his first career interception against Carson Palmer. In his first start of the season in Week 12 against the Cleveland Browns, Munnerlyn stepped in front of a pass from Jake Delhomme intended for Mohamed Massaquoi to pick it off and return it 37 yards for the touchdown. He went on to start five of the last six games of the season for the Panthers. Playing in 16 games with five starts, Munnerlyn recorded 47 tackles and one forced fumble, tied for second on the team with three interceptions (including one returned for a touchdown) and ranked first with 10 passes defensed, contributing to a Panthers defense that ranked seventh in the NFL in average yards per play. He also led the Panthers with a 10.9-yard punt return average on 30 returns for 327 yards with a long of 37 yards and returned two kickoffs for 87 yards.

==== 2011 ====
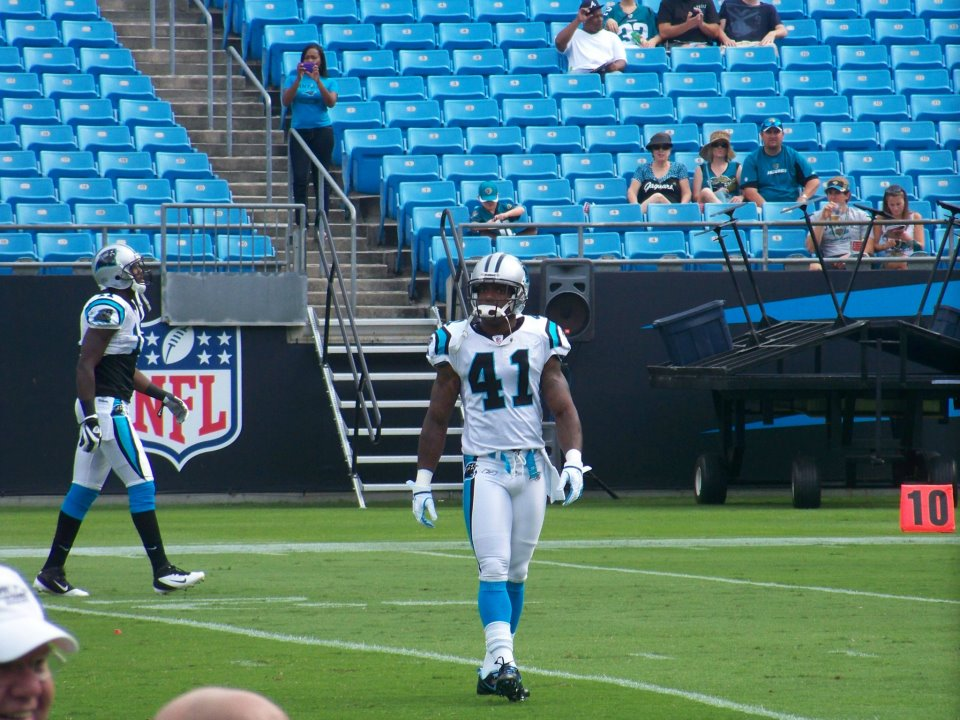
Munnerlyn playing for the Panthers in 2011.

With his professional football career frozen in limbo by the NFL lockout, Munnerlyn spent the spring at Mobile's Murphy High School (his alma mater) as a volunteer assistant, and the experience opened his eyes to the possibilities of life after football. Through 10 days of the Panthers' spring practice, Munnerlyn tutored Murphy's defensive backs as part of veteran coach Ronn Lee's staff. "It was fun," Munnerlyn said by phone from North Carolina, where he participated in informal workouts with his Carolina teammates. "Coach Lee gave me the opportunity to coach the defensive backs and give them some of the knowledge I have from the past, from high school, college and the NFL."

Munnerlyn started 14 games at right cornerback for the Panthers in his third season with the team and responded with a then career-high 58 tackles to go along with two sacks, one quarterback pressure, one forced fumble, one fumble recovery and seven passes defensed. He also accounted for six special teams tackles. In Week 5 at New Orleans Saints on October 9, he registered his first career sack, dropping quarterback Drew Brees for a six-yard loss on a blitz. In a Week 8 game against the Minnesota Vikings, he got his second sack of the season when he tackled Christian Ponder for a one-yard loss after he scrambled to the right to escape from pressure. Later in the game, he also stripped and recovered a fumble by Vikings wide receiver Percy Harvin a yard shy of the endzone. In Week 15, he suffered a strained left hamstring at Houston and was therefore placed on injured reserve on December 23.

==== 2012 ====
Munnerlyn played in 16 games with 11 starts for Carolina in the 2012 season. He tied for the team lead with two interceptions and tied the team record for interceptions returned for scores in a season as he returned both interception for touchdowns, a record that was previously accomplished by Eric Davis in 1998 and Mike Minter in 2003. He produced more tackles than the previous season with 61 tackles. He also batted down six passes and was credited with two quarterback pressures, contributing to a unit that ranked 10th in the NFL in total defense. He started 11 of the last 12 games at left cornerback after Chris Gamble suffered a season-ending injury in Week 7. As a punt returner, he averaged 5.1 yards on a team-high 14 punt returns with a long of 20 yards. In Week 5 against the Seattle Seahawks, he intercepted a pass by quarterback Russell Wilson and returned it 33 yards for a touchdown. In Week 10 at the Denver Broncos, he matched a career-high in tackles with seven. In Week 11, he picked off a pass by Buccaneers quarterback Josh Freeman and returned it 74 yards for a touchdown, his second of the year. In the final game of the season at New Orleans Saints, he equaled his previous career-high of seven tackles.

==== 2013 ====
Prior to the start of training camp, Munnerlyn told ESPN, "I want to help my team get to the playoffs," he said. "I haven't been to the playoffs yet, and I've been in the league for four years. That's my No. 1 goal." Munnerlyn wound up starting all 16 games for the first time as a Panther at cornerback. He collected two interceptions and led the team with a career-high 13 passes defensed. He returned both interception for touchdowns, tying his own record from the previous season and becoming the new owner of the franchise record with five interception returns for touchdowns. The five interception returns for touchdowns through his first five seasons were tied for the most for any NFL player that began his career since 1970. Munnerlyn finished third on the team with a career-high 74 tackles and posted a career-high 3.5 sacks, three quarterback pressures, one forced fumble and one fumble recovery, playing a key role as a member of a defensive unit that ranked second in the NFL in total defense and points allowed and led the league in sacks while finishing second in rushing defense and sixth in passing defense. In Week 6 at Minnesota, he ripped the ball away from Vikings running back Adrian Peterson to force a fumble. In Week 7, he set the second fastest touchdown to start a game in team history after he intercepted a pass by Rams quarterback Sam Bradford on the first offensive play of the game and returned it 45 yards for the score, coming 21 seconds into the game; later in the game, he also recovered a fumble by wide receiver Tavon Austin that set up a field goal for the Panthers. In Week 13 at the Miami Dolphins, he compiled a single-game career-high and team-leading 13 tackles as the Panthers won 20–16. On December 15, he set the franchise record with his fifth career interception return for a touchdown after he picked off Jets' quarterback Geno Smith and returned it 41 yards for the score, surpassing the previous mark of four by Mike Minter from 1997 to 2006; in that game, he also established a single-game career high with two sacks as he brought down Smith for losses of seven and eight yards. The following week against the New Orleans Saints, he was credited with 1.5 sacks, one when he blitzed quarterback Drew Brees for a five-yard loss and the half combined with defensive end Greg Hardy to sack Brees for another five-yard loss. Munnerlyn helped the Panthers win the NFC South title in 2013 and earn the No. 2 seed in the NFC for the playoffs.

==== Franchise records ====
As of 2017's NFL off-season, Captain Munnerlyn held at least 2 Panthers franchise records, including:

- Interceptions returned for touchdowns, career: (5)
- Interceptions returned for touchdowns, season: (2 in 2012 and 2013; tied with three other players, but the only one to accomplish it twice)

=== Minnesota Vikings ===
==== 2014 ====
On March 13, 2014, Munnerlyn signed a three-year, $14.25 million contract with $7 million in guaranteed money with the Minnesota Vikings. The Vikings wanted a four-year deal, but Munnerlyn signed a three-year deal so he could receive his third contract before turning 30. Munnerlyn stated, "I had other visits set up but the number that Minnesota offered me was the number I was looking for. I was like, 'Man, instead of leaving this offer out there I'm just going to take this. I think this team is on the up. They got a lot of talent".

In his first season as a member of the Minnesota Vikings, Munnerlyn matched a career-high 16 starts, all of them at right cornerback, helping the Vikings defense improve from 31st in passing yards per game in 2013 to 7th during the 2014 campaign. He also helped increase the interception total among all Viking defensive backs from 6 in 2013 up to 12 in 2014. On September 7, he began his Viking career against the St. Louis Rams in the season opener with 5 solo tackles in his first start as a Viking, helping lead the team to a 34–6 win. By midseason, he picked off passes in back-to-back weeks against Buccaneers' Mike Glennon in Week 8 and Redskins' Robert Griffin III in Week 9. At the end of the season, he finished tied for fourth on the team with 7 passes defended and ninth in total tackles with 61. Munnerlyn ended his first year with the Vikings with 61 combined tackles, one fumble recovery, 2 interceptions and 5 pass deflections.

==== 2015 ====
After starting all 16 games at outside cornerback in 2014, Munnerlyn settled into nickel back role, playing in all 16 regular season games with five starts as well as the Wild Card Round of the playoffs. He helped the Vikings defensive unit rank fifth in the NFL in defensive points allowed at 18.9 points per game, playing a key role in the Vikings winning the NFC North title over long-time reigning champs Green Bay Packers for the first time since 2009. In Week 10, he started the game at Oakland and posted a season-best 7 tackles against the Raiders. Four weeks later, he recorded seven solo tackles again in the loss at Arizona Cardinals on December 20. He posted his first sack as a Viking when he corralled Packers' quarterback Aaron Rodgers in Week 11. The following week, he got his first pick of the season when he intercepted Falcons' quarterback Matt Ryan. In the final game of the regular season against the Green Bay Packers for the NFC North title, the Vikings had a 13–3 lead with just over four minutes remaining in the third quarter. On a 3rd-and-12 play, Aaron Rodgers dropped back to his own 45-yard line to make a pass, but Vikings defensive end Everson Griffen got a hand on Rodgers' arm, causing him to fumble; Munnerlyn scooped up the ball at the 55-yard line and with blocking support from safety Andrew Sendejo and linebacker Anthony Barr, ran it all the way back for a touchdown (his first on a fumble recovery). Munnerlyn recorded 55 tackles, a sack, one fumble recovery for a touchdown, two interceptions, and four pass deflections in his second season in Minnesota.

==== 2016 ====
Munnerlyn finished the 2016 season with 55 total tackles (38 solo) and three passes defended.

=== Carolina Panthers (second stint) ===
On March 11, 2017, Munnerlyn signed a four-year, $21 million contract with the Panthers. In the 2017 season, Munnerlyn finished with two sacks, 29 total tackles (24 solo) and four passes defended.

In the 2018 season, Munnerlyn finished with two sacks, 47 total tackles (38 solo), one interception, nine passes defended, and one fumble recovery.

On February 25, 2019, Munnerlyn was released by the Panthers.

=== Buffalo Bills ===
On August 10, 2019, Munnerlyn was signed by the Buffalo Bills. He was released during final roster cuts on August 31.

=== Career statistics ===
| Regular season statistics | | | | Tackles | | | | | Interceptions | | | | | | Fumbles | | | |
| Season | Team | GP | GS | Comb | Total | Ast | Sck | Sfty | PDef | Int | Yds | Avg | Lng | TDs | FF | FR | FR YDS | TDs |
|---|---|---|---|---|---|---|---|---|---|---|---|---|---|---|---|---|---|---|
| 2009 | Carolina Panthers | 15 | 4 | 44 | 39 | 5 | 0.0 | -- | 1 | 0 | 0 | 0.0 | 0 | 0 | 1 | 2 | 0 | 0 |
| 2010 | Carolina Panthers | 16 | 5 | 45 | 41 | 4 | 0.0 | -- | 12 | 3 | 37 | 12.3 | 37T | 1 | 0 | 1 | 0 | 0 |
| 2011 | Carolina Panthers | 14 | 14 | 58 | 43 | 15 | 2.0 | -- | 5 | 0 | 0 | 0.0 | 0 | 0 | 2 | 1 | 0 | 0 |
| 2012 | Carolina Panthers | 16 | 11 | 61 | 48 | 13 | 0.0 | -- | 9 | 2 | 107 | 53.5 | 74T | 2 | 0 | 0 | 0 | 0 |
| 2013 | Carolina Panthers | 16 | 16 | 74 | 48 | 26 | 3.5 | -- | 12 | 2 | 86 | 43.0 | 45T | 2 | 1 | 1 | 0 | 0 |
| 2014 | Minnesota Vikings | 16 | 16 | 61 | 52 | 9 | 0.0 | -- | 5 | 2 | 1 | 0.5 | 1 | 0 | 0 | 1 | 0 | 0 |
| 2015 | Minnesota Vikings | 16 | 5 | 55 | 51 | 4 | 1.0 | -- | 4 | 2 | 30 | 15.0 | 32 | 0 | 1 | 2 | 55 | 1 |
| 2016 | Minnesota Vikings | 15 | 9 | 55 | 38 | 17 | 0.0 | -- | 3 | 0 | 0 | 0.0 | 0 | 0 | 1 | 0 | 0 | 0 |
| 2017 | Carolina Panthers | 14 | 0 | 29 | 24 | 5 | 2.0 | -- | 4 | 0 | 0 | 0.0 | 0 | 0 | 0 | 0 | 0 | 0 |
| 2018 | Carolina Panthers | 16 | 5 | 47 | 38 | 9 | 2.0 | -- | 9 | 1 | 2 | 2.0 | 2 | 0 | 0 | 1 | 0 | 0 |
| Career | | 154 | 85 | 529 | 422 | 107 | 10.5 | -- | 64 | 12 | 263 | 21.9 | 74T | 5 | 6 | 9 | 55 | 1 |

== Personal life ==
Munnerlyn is active with March of Dimes charities, a cause close to his heart as he was a premature baby himself. When asked why his name is Captain, Munnerlyn said, "My momma promised my grandmomma that she could name the last child. I was the boy of the family, and she named me Captain. Her great grandfather was named Captain, so I got named after my great-great grandfather. My sisters and brothers have normal names. I got the odd name. In the beginning it was kind of rough. Kids used to tease me a little, but it fits my personality, because I feel like I'm a leader." Munnerlyn majored in criminal justice while at South Carolina, where he was teammates and roommates with former Viking linebacker Jasper Brinkley. He was named the 2015 Korey Stringer Good Guy Award winner by media covering the Vikings. Munnerlyn is married to Lakisha and has two sons, Captain and Champ, and daughter, Eden.

On January 24, 2025, Munnerlyn was named head coach of the Julius L. Chambers High School football team in Charlotte, North Carolina.
