= 2009 Carolina Panthers season =

NFL team season

- Owner: Jerry Richardson
- General manager: Marty Hurney
- Head coach: John Fox
- Home stadium: Bank of America Stadium

Results
- Record: 8–8
- Division place: 3rd NFC South
- Playoffs: Did not qualify
- All-Pros: Jon Beason (2nd team); Julius Peppers (2nd team)
- Pro Bowlers: DE Julius Peppers; RB DeAngelo Williams; C Ryan Kalil; MLB Jon Beason

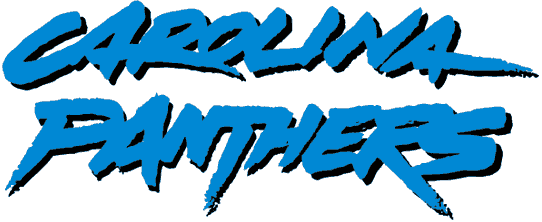
Carolina Panthers word mark 1996 - 2011

The 2009 Carolina Panthers season was the franchise's 15th season in the National Football League (NFL). They failed to improve on their franchise-record 12–4 season in 2008 (which was later surpassed by the 2015 team) and also failed to make the playoffs. The 2009 Panthers are only the sixth team in NFL history to have two players rush for 1,000 yards: Jonathan Stewart (1,133) and DeAngelo Williams (1,117). It was also the first team in NFL history to have two players rush for more than 1,100 yards.

== 2009 NFL draft ==
2009 Carolina Panthers draft
Round	Pick	Player	Position	College	Notes
2	43	Everette Brown	DE	Florida St	Pick from SF
2	59	Sherrod Martin	CB	Troy	
3	93	Corey Irvin	DT	Georgia	
4	111	Mike Goodson	RB	Texas A&M	Pick from SF
4	128	Tony Fiammetta	FB	Syracuse	
5	163	Duke Robinson	OG	Oklahoma	
7	216	Captain Munnerlyn	CB	South Carolina	
Made roster † Pro Football Hall of Fame * Made at least one Pro Bowl during career

=== Trades ===
- The Panthers acquired a second round pick (43) and a fourth round pick (111) from the San Francisco 49ers in exchange for their first round pick in the 2010 NFL draft.

== Staff ==
Carolina Panthers 2009 staff
Front office: Owner/founder – Jerry Richardson; President – Danny Morrison; General manager – Marty Hurney; Director of pro scouting – Mark Koncz; Director of college scouting – Don Gregory; Director of team administration – Rob Rogers; Head coaches: Head coach – John Fox; Assistant head coach/running backs – Jim Skipper; Offensive coaches: Offensive coordinator – Jeff Davidson; Quarterbacks – Rip Scherer; Wide receivers – Richard Williamson; Offensive line – Dave Magazu; Offensive quality control/tight ends – Geep Chryst	Defensive coaches: Defensive coordinator – Ron Meeks; Defensive line – Brian Baker; Linebackers – Richard Smith; Defensive Backs (Secondary) – Mike Gillhamer; Defensive backs – Ron Milus; Defensive quality control – Sam Mills III; Special teams coaches: Special teams coordinator – Danny Crossman; Special teams assistant – Jeff Rodgers; Strength and conditioning: Strength and conditioning – Jerry Simmons

== Final roster ==
2009 Carolina Panthers roster
Quarterbacks (QB): 14 Hunter Cantwell; 11 A. J. Feeley; 3 Matt Moore; Running backs (RB): 42 Tony Fiammetta FB; 33 Mike Goodson KR; 45 Brad Hoover FB; 28 Jonathan Stewart; 22 Tyrell Sutton KR; 34 DeAngelo Williams; Wide receivers (WR): 80 Dwayne Jarrett; 83 Charly Martin; 81 Kenneth Moore KR; 87 Muhsin Muhammad; Tight ends (TE): 82 Gary Barnidge; 47 Jeff King; 88 Dante Rosario	Offensive linemen (OL): 73 Mackenzy Bernadeau C/G; 67 Ryan Kalil C; 64 Rob Pettiti T; 72 Duke Robinson G; 74 Geoff Schwartz T; 68 Keydrick Vincent G; 70 Travelle Wharton G/T; 65 Garry Williams G/T; Defensive linemen (DL): 96 Tyler Brayton DE; 91 Everette Brown DE; 98 Nick Hayden DT; 95 Charles Johnson DE; 61 Derek Landri DT; 92 Damione Lewis DT; 90 Julius Peppers DE; 97 Hilee Taylor DE; 75 Hollis Thomas DT	Linebackers (LB): 50 James Anderson OLB; 52 Jon Beason MLB; 55 Dan Connor MLB; 56 Quinton Culberson OLB; 53 Na'il Diggs OLB; 54 Mortty Ivy OLB; 57 Jordan Senn OLB; Defensive backs (DB): 20 Chris Gamble CB; 30 Charles Godfrey FS; 43 Chris Harris SS; 31 Richard Marshall CB; 23 Sherrod Martin FS; 41 Captain Munnerlyn CB/PR; 26 Quinton Teal SS; 21 Dante Wesley CB; 27 C. J. Wilson CB; Special teams (ST): 7 Jason Baker P; 44 J. J. Jansen LS; 4 John Kasay K; 5 Rhys Lloyd K	Practice squad: 25 DeCori Birmingham RB; 76 Brian de la Puente G; 62 Dustin Fry C; 19 Dexter Jackson WR; 29 Devin Moore RB; 66 Eric Moore DE; 24 Marcus Walker CB; Reserve: 71 C. J. Davis G (IR); 58 Thomas Davis LB (IR); 17 Jake Delhomme QB (IR); 69 Jordan Gross T (IR); 60 Corvey Irvin DT (IR); 59 Landon Johnson OLB (IR); 99 Maʻake Kemoeatu DT (IR); 94 Louis Leonard DT (IR); 12 Josh McCown QB (IR); 79 Jeff Otah T (IR); 89 Steve Smith WR (IR); 93 Tank Tyler DT (IR); Rookies in italics 53 active, 12 reserve, 7 practice squad

== Schedule ==
=== Preseason ===
Week	Date	Kickoff	Opponent	Results		Game Site	TV	NFL Recap
Week	Date	Kickoff	Opponent	Final score	Team record	Game Site	TV	NFL Recap
1	Monday, Aug. 17	8pm EDT	at New York Giants	**L** 17–24	0–1	Giants Stadium	ESPN	
2	Saturday, Aug. 22	7:30 pm EDT	at Miami Dolphins	**L** 17–27	0–2	Land Shark Stadium	Local	
3	Saturday, Aug. 29	8pm EDT	Baltimore Ravens	**L** 13–17	0–3	Bank of America Stadium	CBS	
4	Thursday, Sept. 3	8pm EDT	Pittsburgh Steelers	**L** 10–21	0–4	Bank of America Stadium	CBS	

=== Regular season ===
Week	Date	Kickoff	Opponent	Results		Game Site	TV	NFL Recap
Week	Date	Kickoff	Opponent	Final score	Team record	Game Site	TV	NFL Recap
1	September 13, 2009	1pm EDT	Philadelphia Eagles	**L** 10–38	0–1	Bank of America Stadium	Fox	Recap
2	September 20, 2009	1pm EDT	at **Atlanta Falcons**	**L** 20–28	0–2	Georgia Dome	Fox	Recap
3	Sept. 28 (Monday)	8:30 pm EDT	at Dallas Cowboys	**L** 7–21	0–3	Cowboys Stadium	ESPN	Recap
4	Bye Week							
5	October 11, 2009	1pm EDT	Washington Redskins	**W** 20–17	1–3	Bank of America Stadium	Fox	Recap
6	October 18, 2009	1pm EDT	at **Tampa Bay Buccaneers**	**W** 28–21	2–3	Raymond James Stadium	Fox	Recap
7	October 25, 2009	4:05 pm EDT	Buffalo Bills	**L** 9–20	2–4	Bank of America Stadium	CBS	Recap
8	November 1, 2009	4:15 pm EST	at Arizona Cardinals	**W** 34–21	3–4	University of Phoenix Stadium	Fox	Recap
9	November 8, 2009	4:05 pm EST	at **New Orleans Saints**	**L** 20–30	3–5	Louisiana Superdome	Fox	Recap
10	November 15, 2009	1pm EST	**Atlanta Falcons**	**W** 28–19	4–5	Bank of America Stadium	Fox	Recap
11	Nov. 19 (Thursday)	8:20 pm EST	Miami Dolphins	**L** 17–24	4–6	Bank of America Stadium	NFLN	Recap
12	November 29, 2009	1pm EST	at New York Jets	**L** 6–17	4–7	Giants Stadium	Fox	Recap
13	December 6, 2009	1pm EST	**Tampa Bay Buccaneers**	**W** 16–6	5–7	Bank of America Stadium	Fox	Recap
14	December 13, 2009	1pm EST	at New England Patriots	**L** 10–20	5–8	Gillette Stadium	Fox	Recap
15	December 20, 2009	8:20 pm EST	Minnesota Vikings	**W** 26–7	6–8	Bank of America Stadium	NBC	Recap
16	December 27, 2009	1pm EST	at New York Giants	**W** 41–9	7–8	Giants Stadium	Fox	Recap
17	January 3, 2010	1pm EST	**New Orleans Saints**	**W** 23–10	8–8	Bank of America Stadium	Fox	Recap
NOTE: Division games are in **bold** text.

== Standings ==
NFC South
	W	L	T	PCT	DIV	CONF	PF	PA	STK
^{(1)} New Orleans Saints	13	3	0	.813	4–2	9–3	510	341	L3
Atlanta Falcons	9	7	0	.563	3–3	6–6	363	325	W3
Carolina Panthers	8	8	0	.500	4–2	8–4	315	308	W3
Tampa Bay Buccaneers	3	13	0	.188	1–5	3–9	244	400	L1

== Regular season results ==
=== Week 1: vs. Philadelphia Eagles ===
Quarter	1	2	3	4	Total
Eagles	3	28	7	0	38
Panthers	7	3	0	0	10

at Bank of America Stadium, Charlotte, North Carolina

- Game time: 1:00 pm EDT
- Game weather: 82 °F (28 °C) (Sunny)
- Game attendance: 73,599
- Referee: Jeff Triplette
- TV announcers (Fox): Dick Stockton, Charles Davis, & Laura Okmin

The Panthers began their season with a Week 1 duel with the Philadelphia Eagles. They were playing with Jake Delhomme, who had five interceptions, and one fumble in their postseason game, last year, vs. the Arizona Cardinals. In the first quarter, Carolina pounced first with running back DeAngelo Williams getting an 11-yard touchdown run. The Eagles responded with kicker David Akers getting a 49-yard field goal. In the second quarter, Philadelphia took control as Panthers quarterback Jake Delhomme lost a fumble, which was recovered by defensive end Victor Abiamiri and returned two yards for a touchdown. Also, wide receiver DeSean Jackson returned a punt 85 yards for a touchdown, and quarterback Donovan McNabb completed a 9-yard touchdown pass to tight end Brent Celek and a 4-yard touchdown pass to running back Brian Westbrook. The Panthers closed out the period with kicker John Kasay nailing a 22-yard field goal. Afterwards, in the third quarter, the Eagles continued their domination as McNabb got a 3-yard touchdown run.

With the loss, Carolina began its season at 0–1.

Delhomme (7-of-17 for 73 yards) was benched after committing five turnovers (four interceptions and a fumble).

=== Week 2: at Atlanta Falcons ===
Quarter	1	2	3	4	Total
Panthers	3	10	0	7	20
Falcons	7	14	0	7	28

at Georgia Dome, Atlanta, Georgia

- Game time: 1:00 pm EDT
- Game weather: None (Domed Stadium)
- Game attendance: 67,313
- Referee: Don Carey
- TV announcers (Fox): Dick Stockton and Charles Davis

Hoping to rebound from their loss to the Eagles, the Panthers flew to the Georgia Dome for a Week 2 NFC South duel with the Atlanta Falcons. In the first quarter, Carolina delivered the first scratch as kicker John Kasay got a 38-yard field goal. The Falcons answered with quarterback Matt Ryan completing a 24-yard touchdown pass to tight end Tony Gonzalez. The Panthers retook the lead in the second quarter as running back DeAngelo Williams getting a 3-yard touchdown run, but Atlanta repliedy with Ryan completing a 10-yard touchdown pass to running back Jason Snelling. Carolina gained some ground as Kasay nailed a 50-yard field goal, but the Falcons closed out the first half scoring with Ryan completing a 7-yard touchdown pass to wide receiver Roddy White. After a scoreless third quarter, Atlanta pulled away as running back Michael Turner getting a 1-yard touchdown. The Panthers tried to rally, but get only get an 11-yard touchdown pass from quarterback Jake Delhomme to tight end Dante Rosario.

With the loss, Carolina fell to 0–2.

=== Week 3: at Dallas Cowboys ===
Quarter	1	2	3	4	Total
Panthers	0	7	0	0	7
Cowboys	0	0	10	11	21

at Cowboys Stadium, Arlington, Texas

- Game time: 8:30 pm EDT
- Game weather: None (Domed Closed)
- Game attendance: 90,588
- Referee: Tony Corrente
- TV announcers (ESPN): Mike Tirico, Ron Jaworski, & Jon Gruden

Still looking for their first win of the season, the Panthers flew to Cowboys Stadium for a Week 3 Monday night duel with the Dallas Cowboys. After a scoreless first quarter, Carolina took the lead in the second quarter with quarterback Jake Delhomme's 25-yard touchdown pass to tight end Dante Rosario. The Cowboys took the lead in the third quarter with kicker Nick Folk's 24-yard field goal and running back Tashard Choice's 5-yard touchdown run. Dallas extended their lead in the fourth quarter with Folk's 19-yard field goal and cornerback Terence Newman returning Delhomme's 7th interception of the season 27 yards for a touchdown (with Choice getting the 2-point conversion run). The Panthers tried to rally, but the Cowboys' defense prevented their comeback.

With the loss, Carolina entered its bye week at 0–3.

=== Week 5: vs. Washington Redskins ===
Quarter	1	2	3	4	Total
Redskins	7	3	7	0	17
Panthers	0	2	7	11	20

at Bank of America Stadium, Charlotte, North Carolina

- Game time: 1:00 pm EDT
- Game weather: 70 °F (21 °C) (Partly Cloudy)
- Game attendance: 73,487
- Referee: Walt Coleman
- TV announcers (Fox): Thom Brennaman & Brian Billick

Following their bye week, the Panthers returned to Charlotte to face the Washington Redskins. After a DeAngelo Williams fumble, the Redskins struck first blood with quarterback Jason Campbell's 10-yard touchdown pass to running back Clinton Portis. During the second quarter, linebacker Thomas Davis and defensive end Julius Peppers tackled Portis in the endzone for a safety, making the score 7–2. The Redskins responded with a 39-yard field goal by kicker Shaun Suisham. During the third quarter, cornerback DeAngelo Hall intercepted quarterback Jake Delhomme's pass and took it to the one, with Clinton Portis capping it off with a touchdown run, making it 17–2. The Panthers then scored on a 17-yard touchdown catch by tight end Jeff King. In the fourth quarter, kicker John Kasay booted a 43-yard field goal, decreasing the lead to 17–12. After a botched punt return by the Redskins, Carolina scored on an 8-yard run by running back Jonathan Stewart. With the two-point conversion pass to wide receiver Steve Smith, Carolina took a 20–17 lead. After a Washington punt, the Panthers ran out the clock with an 8-yard run by Jake Delhomme.

With the comeback win, the Panthers improved to 1–3.

=== Week 6: at Tampa Bay Buccaneers ===
Quarter	1	2	3	4	Total
Panthers	0	7	14	7	28
Buccaneers	7	0	7	7	21

at Raymond James Stadium, Tampa, Florida

- Game time: 1:00 pm EDT
- Game weather: 64 °F (18 °C) (Sunny)
- Game attendance: 62,422
- Referee: John Parry
- TV announcers (Fox): Dick Stockton & Charles Davis

Coming off their win over the Redskins, the Panthers flew to Raymond James Stadium for a Week 6 NFC South duel with the Tampa Bay Buccaneers. Carolina trailed in the first quarter as Buccaneers running back Cadillac Williams got a 20-yard touchdown run, but the Panthers tied the game in the second quarter with a 20-yard touchdown from running back DeAngelo Williams.

In the third quarter, Carolina took the lead with quarterback Jake Delhomme's 1-yard touchdown pass to tight end Jeff King and running back Jonathan Stewart's 26-yard touchdown run. Tampa Bay immediately answered with a 97 yard kickoff return for a touchdown by wide receiver Sammie Stroughter. The Buccaneers tied the game in the fourth quarter as safety Tanard Jackson returned an interception 26 yards for a touchdown, but the Panthers got the last laugh as Williams got a 1-yard touchdown run.

With the win, Carolina improved to 2–3.

Cornerback Dante Wesley was ejected from the game in the second quarter after ramming into Buccaneers kick returner Clifton Smith. He later received a one-game suspension.

=== Week 7: vs. Buffalo Bills ===
Quarter	1	2	3	4	Total
Bills	7	0	0	13	20
Panthers	0	2	0	7	9

at Bank of America Stadium, Charlotte, North Carolina

- Game time: 4:05 pm EDT
- Game weather: 67 °F (19 °C) (Mostly Cloudy)
- Game attendance: 73,497
- Referee: Terry McAulay
- TV announcers (CBS): Gus Johnson & Steve Tasker

Coming off their divisional road win over the Buccaneers, the Panthers went home for a Week 7 interconference duel with the Buffalo Bills. Carolina found themselves trailing in the first quarter as Bills running back Marshawn Lynch got a 7-yard touchdown run. The Panthers responded in the second quarter as defensive tackle Hollis Thomas tackled running back Fred Jackson in his endzone for a safety.

After a scoreless third quarter, Buffalo got a big play in the fourth quarter as quarterback Ryan Fitzpatrick completing a 2-yard touchdown pass to wide receiver Lee Evans, followed by kicker Rian Lindell nailing a 29-yard field goal. Carolina tried to recover as running back DeAngelo Williams got a 15-yard touchdown run, but the Bills sealed the win with Lindell's 22-yard field goal.

With the loss, the Panthers fell to 2-4.

=== Week 8: at Arizona Cardinals ===
Quarter	1	2	3	4	Total
Panthers	7	21	0	6	34
Cardinals	7	0	7	7	21

at University of Phoenix Stadium, Glendale, Arizona

- Game time: 4:15 pm EST/1:15 pm MST
- Game weather: None (Dome Closed)
- Game attendance: 62,031
- Referee: Mike Carey
- TV announcers (Fox): Chris Myers, Brian Billick & Jaime Maggio

Hoping to rebound from their dismal home loss to the Bills, the Panthers flew to the University of Phoenix Stadium for a Week 8 duel with the Arizona Cardinals in a rematch of last year's divisional game.

Carolina began the scoring with a 6-yard touchdown run from running back Jonathan Stewart. The Cardinals answered with quarterback Kurt Warner completing a 14-yard touchdown pass to running back LaRod Stephens-Howling. The Panthers took a commanding lead in the second quarter as Stewart got a 10-yard touchdown run, quarterback Jake Delhomme hooked up with wide receiver Steve Smith on a 50-yard touchdown pass, and defensive end Julius Peppers returned an interception 13 yards for a touchdown.

In the third quarter, Arizona began to rally as Warner connected with tight end Ben Patrick on a 1-yard touchdown pass. Carolina answered in the fourth quarter with a 35-yard field goal from kicker John Kasay. The Cardinals tried to pull off a comeback as running back Tim Hightower got a 1-yard touchdown run, yet the Panthers closed out the game with Kasay's 31-yard field goal.

With the win, Carolina improved to 3–4.

The Panthers' defense had a field day, recording 5 interceptions and a fumble recovery.

=== Week 9: at New Orleans Saints ===
Quarter	1	2	3	4	Total
Panthers	14	3	3	0	20
Saints	0	6	14	10	30

at Louisiana Superdome, New Orleans, Louisiana

- Game time: 4:05 pm EST
- Game weather: None (Domed Stadium)
- Game attendance: 70,011
- Referee: Scott Green
- TV announcers (Fox): Thom Brennaman & Brian Billick

Coming off a defensively-strong performance against the Cardinals, the Panthers flew to the Louisiana Superdome for a Week 9 NFC South duel with the undefeated New Orleans Saints. Carolina got off to a fast start in the first quarter as running back DeAngelo Williams got a 66-yard and a 7-yard touchdown run. The Saints got on the board in the second quarter as kicker John Carney made a 23-yard field goal. The Panthers came right back as kicker John Kasay nailed a 32-yard field goal, but New Orleans closed out the half as Carney booted a 25-yard field goal.

In the third quarter, the Saints continued to hack away as running back Pierre Thomas got a 10-yard touchdown run. Carolina answered with Kasay's 25-yard field goal, but New Orleans tied the game to end the period as quarterback Drew Brees completed a 54-yard touchdown pass to wide receiver Robert Meachem. Afterwards, the Saints pulled away in the fourth quarter with Carney's 40-yard field goal, followed by defensive tackle Anthony Hargrove forcing a fumble from Williams and returning it 1 yard for a touchdown.

With the loss, the Panthers fell to 3-5

=== Week 10: vs. Atlanta Falcons ===
Quarter	1	2	3	4	Total
Falcons	3	7	3	6	19
Panthers	7	14	0	7	28

at Bank of America Stadium, Charlotte, North Carolina

- Game time: 1:00 pm EST
- Game weather: 73 °F (23 °C) (Sunny)
- Game attendance: 73,239
- Referee: Bill Leavy
- TV announcers (Fox): Kenny Albert, Daryl Johnston & Tony Siragusa

Hoping to rebound from their tough divisional road loss to the Saints, the Panthers went home for a Week 10 NFC South rematch with the Atlanta Falcons. Carolina trailed early in the first quarter as Falcons kicker Jason Elam booted a 35-yard field goal, yet the Panthers came right as running back Jonathan Stewart got a 1-yard touchdown run. Carolina added to their lead in the second with quarterback Jake Delhomme hooking up with wide receiver Steve Smith on a 4-yard touchdown pass, yet Atlanta answered with a 1-yard touchdown run from running back Jason Snelling. The Panthers close out the first half scoring with Delhomme's 4-yard touchdown pass to Smith.

In the second half, the Falcons began to erase their deficit as Elam nailed a 24-yard field goal in the third quarter, followed by quarterback Matt Ryan completing a 3-yard touchdown pass to tight end Justin Peelle. Afterwards, Carolina pulled away as Stewart got a 45-yard touchdown run.

With the win, the Panthers improved to 4-5.

=== Week 11: vs. Miami Dolphins ===
Quarter	1	2	3	4	Total
Dolphins	0	14	0	10	24
Panthers	3	0	0	14	17

at Bank of America Stadium, Charlotte, North Carolina

- Game time: 8:20 pm EST
- Game weather: 56 °F (13 °C) (Cloudy)
- Game attendance: 73,475
- Referee: Walt Anderson
- TV announcers (NFLN): Bob Papa & Matt Millen

Coming off their divisional home win to the Falcons, the Panthers went home for a Week 11 Interconference duel with the Miami Dolphins. In the first quarter, Carolina got on the board first with John Kasay hitting a 29-yard field goal. In the second quarter the Dolphins replied and took the lead with Chad Henne getting a 14-yard touchdown pass to Ricky Williams, and a 1-yard touchdown run from Williams again. After a scoreless third quarter the Panthers slightly improved as John Kasay nailed a 33-yard field goal, until Miami kept it a 2-possession game when Dan Carpenter got a 37-yard field goal. The Panthers kept their hopes alive as Jake Delhomme made a 27-yard touchdown pass to Steve Smith (with a successful 2-point conversion made by DeAngelo Williams). The Dolphins pulled away as Ricky Williams made a 46-yard touchdown run. The 48-yard field goal made by John Kasay near the end of the game wasn't enough for the Panthers and that resulted in a loss.

With the loss, the Panthers fell to 4–6.

=== Week 12: at New York Jets ===
Quarter	1	2	3	4	Total
Panthers	0	3	0	3	6
Jets	7	7	0	3	17

at Giants Stadium, East Rutherford, New Jersey

- Game time: 1:00 pm EST
- Game weather: 53 °F (12 °C) (Clear)
- Game attendance: 76,381
- Referee: Jerome Boger
- TV announcers (Fox): Thom Brennaman, Brian Billick & Chris Myers

With both teams coming off of tough losses, the Panthers went on the road to face the formidable defense of the New York Jets in what was on paper a close matchup. Both teams sported identical 4–6 records and were top 3 in rushing offense, while sporting similar numbers in pass defense game. Things started out well for Carolina, their first drive taking almost 6 minutes of clock to drive down into Jets territory when bad luck struck them. A miscommunication between Jake Delhomme and Steve Smith resulted in a pass being fired at Smith while he wasn't looking, and it caromed off of Smith's leg into the arms of Jets' CB Darrelle Revis, who returned it 67 yards for a TD. It was the first of Delhomme's 4 INTs of the day, two each by Revis and safety Kerry Rhodes. Rhodes' first set the Jets up in good field position, which the Jets were able to capitalize on when Thomas Jones ran the ball in for a 4-yard TD. The Panthers soon after that struggled to do anything against the Jets defense and secured only two John Kasay field goals for a 17–6 defeat.

The Panthers fell to 4–7 and wound up losing Jake Delhomme to a broken finger on his throwing hand.

=== Week 13: vs. Tampa Bay Buccaneers ===
Quarter	1	2	3	4	Total
Buccaneers	0	6	0	0	6
Panthers	10	0	3	3	16

at Bank of America Stadium, Charlotte, North Carolina

- Game time: 1:00 pm EST
- Game weather: 43 °F (6 °C) (Mostly Sunny)
- Game attendance: 72,455
- Referee: Don Carey
- TV announcers (Fox): Ron Pitts & John Lynch

With the win, the Panthers improved to 5–7.

=== Week 14: at New England Patriots ===
Quarter	1	2	3	4	Total
Panthers	7	0	0	3	10
Patriots	0	7	7	6	20

at Gillette Stadium, Foxborough, Massachusetts

- Game time: 1:00 pm EST
- Game weather: 40 °F (4 °C) (Cloudy)
- Game attendance: 68,756
- Referee: Terry McAulay
- TV announcers (Fox): Kenny Albert, Daryl Johnston & Tony Siragusa

With the loss, the Panthers fell to 5–8.

=== Week 15: vs. Minnesota Vikings ===
Quarter	1	2	3	4	Total
Vikings	0	7	0	0	7
Panthers	0	6	0	20	26

at Bank of America Stadium, Charlotte, North Carolina

- Game time: 8:20 pm EST
- TV announcers (NBC): Al Michaels & Cris Collinsworth

With the surprising win against the playoff-bound Vikings, the Panthers improved to 6–8. This marked Carolina's first Sunday Night Football home game since NBC picked up the rights in 2006.

=== Week 16: at New York Giants ===
Quarter	1	2	3	4	Total
Panthers	3	21	10	7	41
Giants	0	0	3	6	9

at Giants Stadium, East Rutherford, New Jersey

- Game time: 1:00 pm EST
- TV announcers (Fox): Joe Buck, Troy Aikman & Pam Oliver

=== Week 17: vs. New Orleans Saints ===
Team	1	2	3	4	Total
Saints	0	3	7	0	10
• Panthers	7	10	6	0	23

- Date: January 3
- Location: Bank of America Stadium
- Game start: 1:00 p.m. EST
- Elapsed time: 2:58
- Game attendance: 73,047
- Game weather: 30 °F (−1 °C); wind 7 mph (11 km/h)
- Referee: Alberto Riveron
- Television network: Fox

Scoring summary
Q1	14:08	CAR	Stewart 67 yard run (Kasay kick)	CAR 7–0
Q2	11:13	NO	Hartley 35 yard field goal	CAR 7–3
Q2	0:13	CAR	Jarrett 30 yard pass from Moore (Kasay kick)	CAR 14–3
Q2	0:00	CAR	Kasay 41 yard field goal	CAR 17–3
Q3	8:06	CAR	Kasay 39 yard field goal	CAR 20–3
Q3	5:05	CAR	Kasay 37 yard field goal	CAR 23–3
Q3	0:07	NO	Hamilton 1 yard run (Hartley kick)	CAR 23–10

- Jonathan Stewart 16 Rush, 125 Yds

== Scores by quarter ==
	1	2	3	4	Total
Opponents	41	72	55	71	239
Panthers	41	72	21	59	193
