= Charles Godfrey (American football) =

American football player (born 1985)

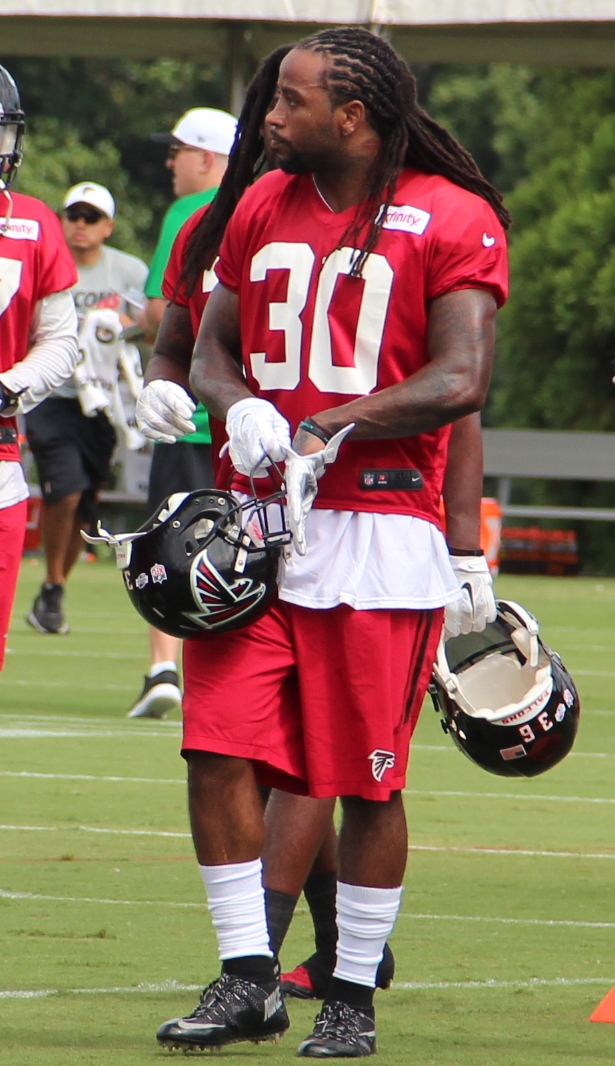
- Godfrey with the Atlanta Falcons in 2015

No. 30
- Position: Safety

Personal information
- Born: November 15, 1985 (age 40); Baytown, Texas, U.S.
- Listed height: 6 ft 0 in (1.83 m)
- Listed weight: 210 lb (95 kg)

Career information
- High school: Lee (Baytown)
- College: Iowa
- NFL draft: 2008: 3rd round, 67th overall pick

Career history
- Carolina Panthers (2008–2014); Atlanta Falcons (2014–2015)

Awards and highlights
- Second-team All-Big Ten (2007)

Career NFL statistics
- Total tackles: 384
- Sacks: 3
- Forced fumbles: 8
- Fumble recoveries: 3
- Interceptions: 11
- Defensive touchdowns: 1
- Stats at Pro Football Reference

Charles Marquise Godfrey (born November 15, 1985) is an American former professional football player who was a safety in the National Football League (NFL). He played college football for the Iowa Hawkeyes and was selected by the Carolina Panthers in the third round of the 2008 NFL draft.

== College career ==
At the University of Iowa, Godfrey appeared in 47 games with 28 starts, 25 coming at cornerback, two at strong safety, and one at free safety. During his career he recorded 193 tackles and seven interceptions. In his junior season, he recorded 83 tackles and two interceptions. As a senior, he recorded 65 tackles and five interceptions.

== Professional career ==
=== Pre-draft ===
Pre-draft measurables
Height	Weight	Arm length	Hand span	40-yard dash	10-yard split	20-yard split	20-yard shuttle	Three-cone drill	Vertical jump	Broad jump	Bench press
5 ft 11 3/4 in (1.82 m)	207 lb (94 kg)	31 in (0.79 m)	9 1/4 in (0.23 m)	4.38 s	1.46 s	2.53 s	4.40 s	7.28 s	37.5 in (0.95 m)	10 ft 1 in (3.07 m)	14 reps
All values from NFL Combine/Pro Day

Despite spending most of his time at cornerback, he was described as a physical hitter that likes to provide run support, and may be better suited at safety.

=== Carolina Panthers ===
Godfrey was selected with the 67th overall pick in the third round of the 2008 NFL draft. The Panthers previously acquired the pick from the New York Jets along with a 5th round pick that was used to select Gary Barnidge in a trade that sent Kris Jenkins to the Jets. He was quickly announced the team's free safety during camp that May, after reportedly impressing coaches. He started all 16 games at the free safety position and finished his rookie campaign with 61 tackles, 1 sack, 1 forced fumble and 1 interception.

On September 10, 2011, the Panthers re-signed Godfrey to a 5-year/$27.5 million contract extension with $12.4 million guaranteed.

On October 26, 2012, Godfrey was fined $7,875 for a chop block in Week 7 against the Dallas Cowboys.

It was announced during the offseason before the 2014 NFL season that Godfrey would be moved from safety to nickelback. He was released on October 21, 2014.

=== Atlanta Falcons ===
On October 28, 2014, Godfrey was signed by the Atlanta Falcons.

He was released on September 15, 2015, in order to make room for the signing of Jake Long. On October 6, Godfrey re-signed with the Falcons to offer depth while starting safety Ricardo Allen recovers from injuries.

On October 20, 2015, it was reported that the Falcons had released Godfrey in order to make room for newly acquired linebacker, Philip Wheeler. On October 27, 2015, the Falcons re-signed Godfrey.

Godfrey signed another contract to stay with the Falcons on March 15, 2016, but decided to retire and was placed on the team's reserve/retired list. He was released from the list on July 26, 2020.

== NFL career statistics ==
Year	Team	GP	COMB	TOTAL	AST	SACK	FF	FR	FR YDS	INT	IR YDS	AVG IR	LNG	TD	PD
2008	CAR	16	61	52	9	1.0	1	2	0	1	16	16	16	0	5
2009	CAR	12	45	35	10	0.0	4	0	0	1	12	12	12	0	5
2010	CAR	16	84	70	14	0.0	1	0	0	5	112	22	38	0	8
2011	CAR	14	84	66	18	1.0	1	0	0	2	30	15	21	0	7
2012	CAR	15	69	44	25	0.0	0	1	0	2	9	5	9	1	6
2013	CAR	2	10	8	2	1.0	0	0	0	0	0	0	0	0	2
2014	CAR	7	19	14	5	0.0	0	0	0	0	0	0	0	0	0
2014	ATL	5	0	0	0	0.0	0	0	0	0	0	0	0	0	0
2015	ATL	8	12	10	2	0.0	1	0	0	0	0	0	0	0	1
Total		95	384	299	85	3.0	8	3	0	11	179	16	38	1	34
