= Charles Johnson (defensive end) =

American football player (born 1986)

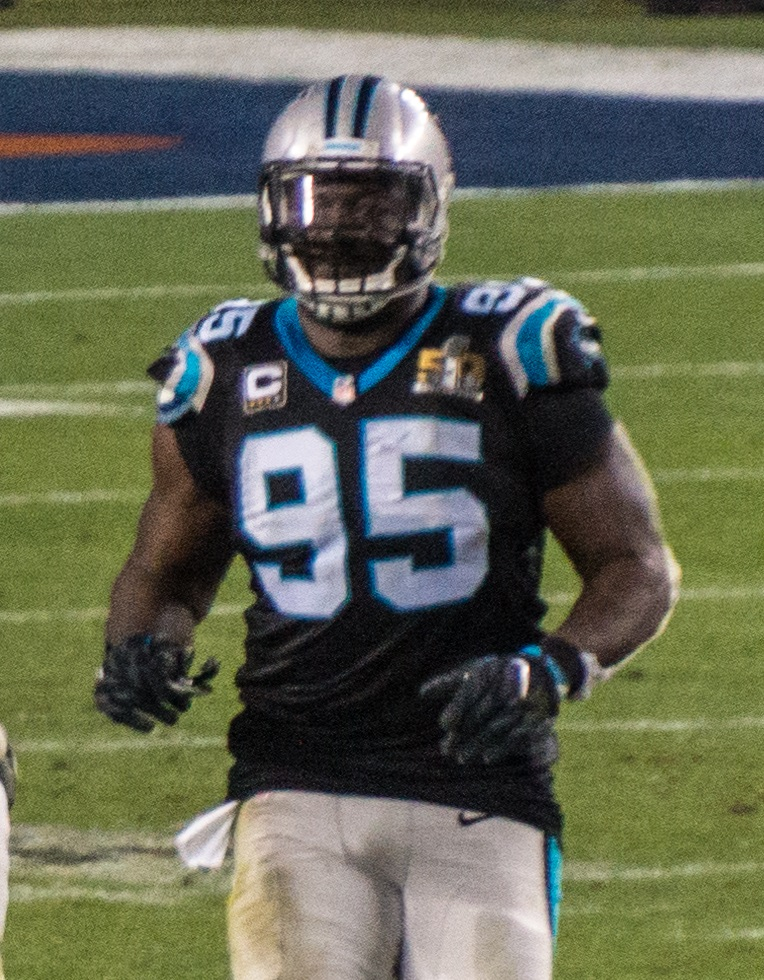
- Johnson playing in Super Bowl 50 for the Panthers

No. 95
- Position: Defensive end

Personal information
- Born: July 10, 1986 (age 40); Hawkinsville, Georgia, U.S.
- Listed height: 6 ft 2 in (1.88 m)
- Listed weight: 278 lb (126 kg)

Career information
- High school: Hawkinsville
- College: Georgia
- NFL draft: 2007: 3rd round, 83rd overall pick

Career history
- Carolina Panthers (2007–2017)

Awards and highlights
- Second-team All-SEC (2006)

Career NFL statistics
- Total tackles: 321
- Sacks: 67.5
- Forced fumbles: 19
- Fumble recoveries: 4
- Stats at Pro Football Reference

Charles Johnson (born July 10, 1986) is an American former professional football player who was a defensive end for 11 seasons for the Carolina Panthers in the National Football League (NFL). He played college football for the Georgia Bulldogs and was selected by the Panthers in the third round of the 2007 NFL draft.

== Early life ==
Johnson attended Hawkinsville High School, where he was a three-sport athlete in football, basketball and track. He played defensive end for the Hawkinsville Red Devils football team. As a junior, he earned Class A All-State honorable mention and All-Area honors. As a senior, he recorded 16 sacks and 30 pressures while leading his team to the Class A State Championship, where he returned an interception 83 yards for a touchdown. He participated in the GACA North-South All-Star game.

In addition to football, he also played basketball and ran track. He played as a forward on the basketball team. In track & field, he competed as a member of the Hawkinsville relay squads, recording personal-best times of 43.27 seconds in the 4x100 and 3:42.47 minutes in the 4x400. He also ran a 4.6-second 40-yard dash.

== Professional career ==
Pre-draft measurables
Height	Weight	Arm length	Hand span	40-yard dash	10-yard split	20-yard split	Three-cone drill	Vertical jump	Broad jump	Bench press
6 ft 2 1/4 in (1.89 m)	270 lb (122 kg)	34 1/4 in (0.87 m)	9 5/8 in (0.24 m)	4.75 s	1.58 s	2.74 s	7.50 s	34.0 in (0.86 m)	9 ft 10 in (3.00 m)	33 reps
All values from NFL Combine, except 40 time from Pro Day

Johnson was considered by some NFL scouts to be a 1st or 2nd round pick and rated as high as the 3rd best defensive end in draft by some scouting services. He went later than expected to the Carolina Panthers in the 3rd round with the 83rd overall pick in the 2007 NFL draft. This was considered to be a great steal by many experts.

During Johnson's rookie year (2007), he appeared sparingly due to playing behind established veterans like Julius Peppers and Mike Rucker.

Johnson appeared in all 16 games of the 2008 season. With Rucker retired, and a year of experience behind him; he showed great strides during the year totaling 25 tackles, 6 quarterback sacks, and forcing 1 fumble.

The 2010 season was his first year as a starter with the departure of longtime starter Julius Peppers and was somewhat of a breakout year for Johnson. Through 16 games he recorded 11.5 sacks (tied for 8th in the NFL) with 62 total tackles, and 1 forced fumble. After the lockout was lifted, Johnson was resigned to a six-year $72M ($32M guaranteed) contract. According to ESPN the Magazine, he was the highest paid player in the NFL during the 2011 season with a total salary of $34M.

Johnson recorded 9.0, 12.5, 11.0, and 8.5 over the 2011–2014 seasons, 11th in the NFL over that time period. He had two sacks in the Panthers' first 2014 playoff game against Arizona. On September 29, 2015, he was placed on injured reserve, and missed five games. However, he returned on November 24, 2015. On February 7, 2016, Johnson was part of the Panthers team that played in Super Bowl 50. In the game, the Panthers fell to the Denver Broncos by a score of 24–10. He had five tackles and a sack in the losing effort, matching the one sack he had in both previous playoff games. His five career playoff sacks is a Panthers franchise record, and his three that year shares a single-postseason record with Kony Ealy.

On March 3, 2016, Johnson was released, but on March 8, 2016, he signed a one-year deal with the Panthers worth $3 million.

On March 7, 2017, Johnson signed a two-year, $9.5 million contract extension with the Panthers. On December 1, 2017, Johnson was suspended for four games due to violating the league's policy on performance-enhancing substances.

On February 26, 2018, Johnson was released by the Panthers. Johnson officially announced his retirement from the NFL on August 22, 2018. He spent his entire professional career with the Carolina Panthers.

== NFL career statistics ==
Legend
**Bold**	Career high

=== Regular season ===
Year	Team	GP	GS	Tackles					Interceptions						Fumbles	
Year	Team	GP	GS	Comb	Total	Ast	Sck	SFTY	PDef	Int	Yds	Avg	Lng	TDs	FF	FR
2007	CAR	3	2	2	1	1	0.0	0	0	0	0	0	0	0	0	0
2008	CAR	16	0	25	20	5	6.0	0	**7**	0	0	0	0	0	1	**1**
2009	CAR	13	2	25	17	8	4.0	0	3	0	0	0	0	0	2	0
2010	CAR	16	16	**62**	**51**	11	11.5	0	1	0	0	0	0	0	1	0
2011	CAR	15	15	40	30	10	9.0	0	4	0	0	0	0	0	1	0
2012	CAR	16	16	41	30	11	**12.5**	0	4	0	0	0	0	0	**7**	**1**
2013	CAR	14	14	31	25	6	11.0	0	0	0	0	0	0	0	1	**1**
2014	CAR	16	16	41	29	**12**	8.5	0	2	0	0	0	0	0	3	**1**
2015	CAR	9	9	12	5	7	1.0	0	1	0	0	0	0	0	0	0
2016	CAR	13	13	26	14	**12**	4.0	0	2	0	0	0	0	0	3	0
2017	CAR	12	11	16	4	**12**	0.0	**1**	0	0	0	0	0	0	0	0
Total		143	114	321	226	95	67.5	0	25	0	0	0	0	0	19	4

=== Postseason ===
Year	Team	GP	GS	Tackles					Interceptions						Fumbles	
Year	Team	GP	GS	Comb	Total	Ast	Sck	SFTY	PDef	Int	Yds	Avg	Lng	TDs	FF	FR
2008–09	CAR	1	0	2	2	0	0.0	0	0	0	0	0	0	0	0	0
2013–14	CAR	1	1	3	3	0	0.0	0	0	0	0	0	0	0	0	0
2014–15	CAR	2	2	5	2	**3**	2.0	0	0	0	0	0	0	0	0	0
2015–16	CAR	3	3	**9**	**7**	2	**3.0**	0	0	0	0	0	0	0	**2**	0
Total		7	6	19	14	5	5.0	0	0	0	0	0	0	0	2	0
