= Reggie Sullivan =

American football player (born 1985)

No. 36
- Position: Cornerback

Personal information
- Born: February 24, 1985 (age 41); Miami, Florida, U.S.
- Listed height: 6 ft 2 in (1.88 m)
- Listed weight: 210 lb (95 kg)

Career information
- High school: Hopewell (Huntersville, North Carolina)
- College: Winston-Salem State (2005); Johnson C. Smith (2006–2007)
- NFL draft: 2009: undrafted

Career history
- Carolina Panthers (2009)*; Toronto Argonauts (2010)*; Sioux Falls Storm (2011); Carolina Panthers (2011–2012)*; Chicago Rush (2012); Trenton Freedom (2014); High Country Grizzlies (2017)
- * Offseason or practice squad member only

Awards and highlights
- United Bowl champion (2011)
- Stats at Pro Football Reference

Reggie Sullivan (born February 24, 1985) is an American former professional football cornerback who played in the National Football League (NFL). He was signed by the Carolina Panthers as an undrafted free agent in 2009. He played college football at Johnson C. Smith.

Sullivan was also a member of the Carolina Panthers, Toronto Argonauts, Sioux Falls Storm, Chicago Rush, Trenton Freedom, and High Country Grizzlies.

== Early life ==
Sullivan played high school football at Hopewell High School in Huntersville, North Carolina.

== College career ==
=== Winston-Salem State ===
Sullivan was recruited out of high school by coach Kermit Blount and Winston-Salem State University. However, his freshman year he was injured before the season had started which he never played a down during the 2005 season. The following year he would transfer to Johnson C. Smith University

=== Johnson C. Smith ===
In 2007, as a redshirt freshman, he played in nine games as a reserve free safety. He recorded twenty-one tackles (fourteen solo) with one sack and an interception that went for sixty-nine yards. The following year, he would forego the remaining years of his college career to pursue a career in professional football.

== Professional career ==
=== Carolina Panthers ===
On May 28, 2009, Sullivan signed with the Carolina Panthers as an undrafted free agent. He was later released after the Panthers had cut down their roster size.

=== Carolina Panthers (second stint) ===
In 2011, Sullivan signed again with the Carolina Panthers as a cornerback for their practice squad. On January 6, 2012, he signed a 1-year, $390,000 contract with the Carolina Panthers to a reserve/future contract. On May 15, 2012, he was released by the Carolina Panthers to make room for running back Armond Smith.
