= Jordan Senn =

American football player (born 1984)

No. 51, 57
- Position: Linebacker

Personal information
- Born: June 11, 1984 (age 42); Beaverton, Oregon, U.S.
- Listed height: 5 ft 11 in (1.80 m)
- Listed weight: 225 lb (102 kg)

Career information
- High school: Beaverton
- College: Portland State
- NFL draft: 2008: undrafted

Career history
- Indianapolis Colts (2008–2009); Carolina Panthers (2009–2013); Chicago Bears (2014)*
- * Offseason or practice squad member only

Career NFL statistics
- Total tackles: 137
- Forced fumbles: 3
- Pass deflections: 2
- Interceptions: 1
- Stats at Pro Football Reference

Jordan Senn (born June 11, 1984) is an American former professional football player who was a linebacker in the National Football League (NFL). He played college football for the Portland State Vikings and was signed by the Indianapolis Colts as an undrafted free agent in 2008. Senn also played for the Carolina Panthers and Chicago Bears.

== Early life ==
Senn graduated from Beaverton High School in 2003.

== Professional career ==
=== Indianapolis Colts ===
After making the team as an undrafted free agent in the 2008 season and playing a role on special teams and as a backup linebacker, Senn made the initial 53-man roster for the team in 2009, only to be released on September 7, 2009 when the team signed former Arizona Cardinals safety Aaron Francisco.

Senn was re-signed to the active roster on September 23. He was waived on October 7.

=== Carolina Panthers ===
Senn was signed by the Carolina Panthers on November 24. After playing mostly on special teams for 2010, he entered 2011 as 3rd on the depth chart at linebacker. He played mostly special teams again for the first half of the season. Due to a rash of injuries, he ended up starting at weakside linebacker for the final 7 games of the season, responding with 71 tackles, 3 forced fumbles and an interception. This was one of the highest tackle totals in the NFL for that 7 game period. He was also the smallest starting linebacker in the NFL for that period, height and weight combined.

On April 12, 2012, he was re-signed by the Carolina Panthers, and served as the Panthers special teams captain for the 2012 season.

=== Chicago Bears ===
On March 11, 2014, Senn signed with the Chicago Bears on a one-year contract. The Bears released Senn on August 24, 2014.

=== Post-NFL Career ===
Following his departure from the NFL, Senn went to medical school at A. T. Still University in Mesa, Arizona, graduating in the class of 2021, receiving his medical training during the height of the COVID-19 pandemic. He is currently an emergency medicine resident at Oregon Health & Science University.

== Personal life ==
He is married with 2 sons currently and lives in his hometown of Beaverton, Oregon.
