= Sherrod Martin =

American football player (born 1984)

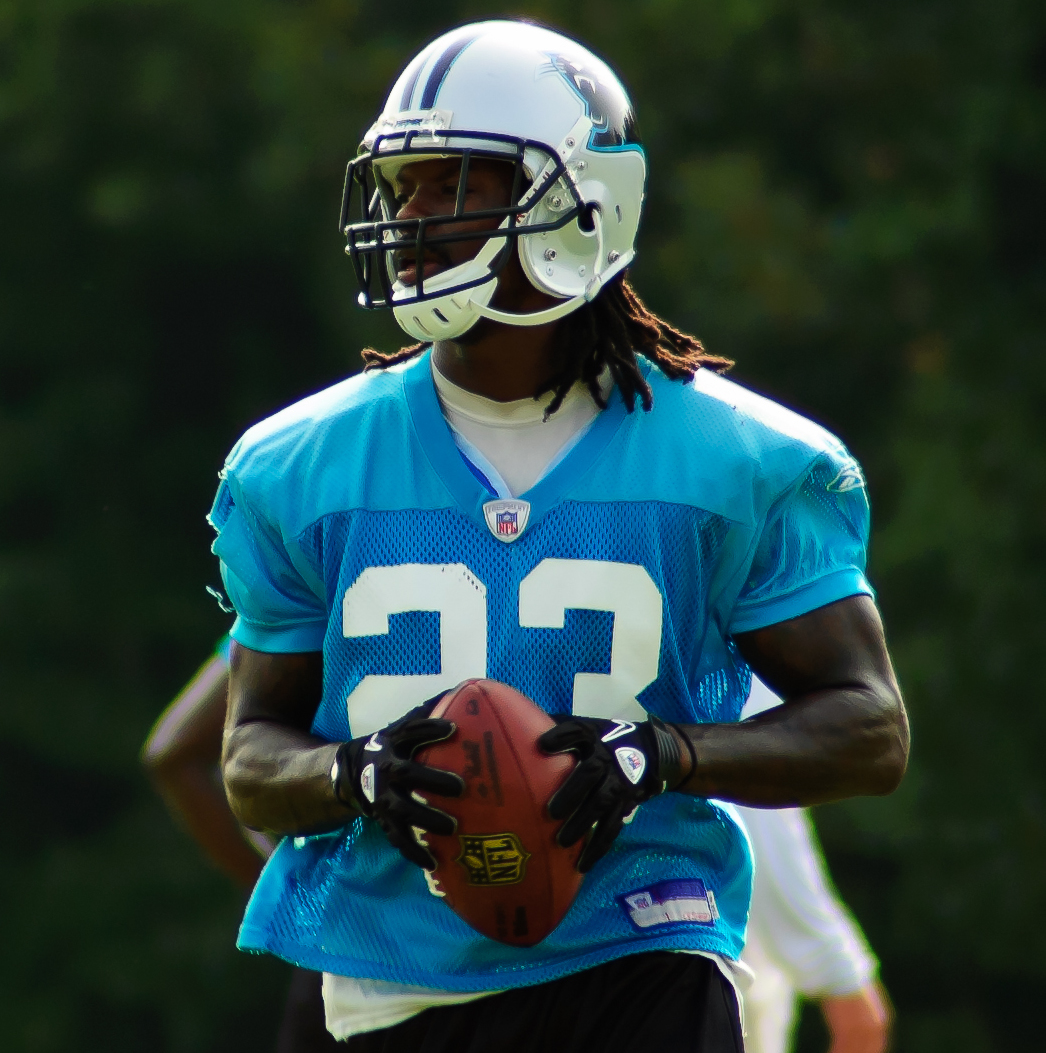
- Martin with the Carolina Panthers in 2009

No. 23, 36
- Position: Safety

Personal information
- Born: October 12, 1984 (age 42); Griffin, Georgia, U.S.
- Listed height: 6 ft 1 in (1.85 m)
- Listed weight: 200 lb (91 kg)

Career information
- High school: Griffin
- College: Troy
- NFL draft: 2009: 2nd round, 59th overall pick

Career history
- Carolina Panthers (2009−2012); Jacksonville Jaguars (2014); Chicago Bears (2015)

Awards and highlights
- First-team All-Sun Belt (2008)

Career NFL statistics
- Total tackles: 217
- Forced fumbles: 5
- Fumble recoveries: 1
- Pass deflections: 22
- Interceptions: 8
- Stats at Pro Football Reference

Jerald Sherrod Martin (born October 12, 1984) is an American former professional football player who was a safety in the National Football League (NFL). He played college football for the Troy Trojans and was selected by the Carolina Panthers in the second round of the 2009 NFL draft. Martin has also played for the Jacksonville Jaguars and Chicago Bears.

== Early life ==
Martin was born in 1984 in Griffin, Georgia as one of three children to parents Diane and John. He has a brother named Cory and a sister named Chrystal. At age 9, Martin began playing football and continued through middle and high school. While at Griffin High, Martin played three seasons as a free safety and wide receiver under head coach Steve Devoursney. Griffin was elected team captain in his senior high school year. Griffin Daily News named him All-Purpose Player of the Year in 2002. In that same year, Martin caught seven passes for 177 yards and led the team and the region in punt returns. In Martin's senior year, the Kudzu Magazine named him to the All-Area team. Martin also played four seasons of basketball and competed two seasons in track and field.

== College career ==
Enrolling at Troy University in 2004, Martin played strong safety while assigned as a reservist and member of special teams. He played 12 games during his initial season and was promoted to a starter. He was redshirted in 2006 after undergoing surgery on both his shoulders. By 2007, Martin was assigned to free safety. While attending Troy, Martin majored in Business Management.

== Professional career ==
=== Carolina Panthers ===
Martin was drafted in the second round by the Carolina Panthers.

In his first career start against Arizona, Martin recorded two interceptions.

=== Jacksonville Jaguars ===
On December 30, 2013, the Jacksonville Jaguars signed Martin to a reserve/future contract. He was released on August 30, 2014. He was re-signed on September 23. He became a free agent after the 2014 season.

=== Chicago Bears ===
On June 18, 2015, Martin signed a one-year contract with the Chicago Bears. On September 6, 2015, he was released by the Bears. He was re-signed on October 6.

== NFL career statistics ==
Legend
**Bold**	Career high

Year	Team	Games		Tackles					Interceptions					Fumbles			
Year	Team	GP	GS	Cmb	Solo	Ast	Sck	TFL	Int	Yds	TD	Lng	PD	FF	FR	Yds	TD
2009	CAR	**16**	5	22	17	5	0.0	0	**3**	**35**	0	23	4	1	0	0	0
2010	CAR	15	15	**85**	**59**	**26**	0.0	**2**	1	34	0	**34**	5	**2**	**1**	0	0
2011	CAR	**16**	**16**	68	50	18	0.0	1	**3**	16	0	15	**8**	0	0	0	0
2012	CAR	12	0	23	20	3	0.0	0	0	0	0	0	3	1	0	0	0
2014	JAX	13	2	16	13	3	0.0	1	1	0	0	0	2	1	0	0	0
2015	CHI	12	0	3	3	0	0.0	0	0	0	0	0	0	0	0	0	0
		84	38	217	162	55	0.0	4	8	85	0	34	22	5	1	0	0

== Personal life ==
Martin cut hair in his neighborhood growing up and for teammates in college. During his time with the Jaguars, Sherrod Martin trained to become a barber, preparing for a career after the NFL. Martin now currently works as a master barber in the Atlanta area with current and former NFL players.
