= J. J. Jansen =

American football player (born 1986)

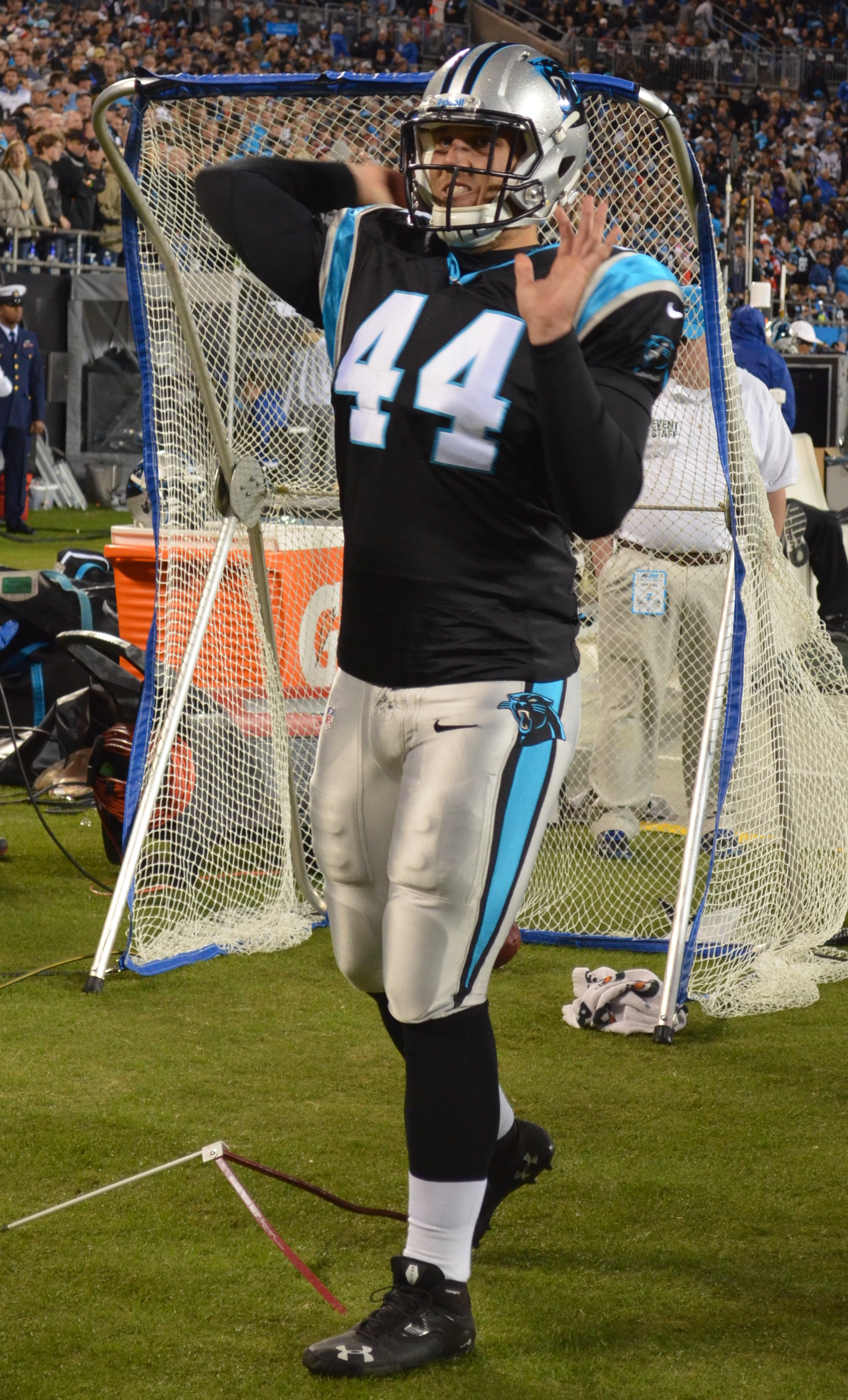
- Jansen with the Carolina Panthers in 2013

No. 44 – Carolina Panthers
- Position: Long snapper
- Roster status: Active

Personal information
- Born: January 20, 1986 (age 40); Phoenix, Arizona, U.S.
- Listed height: 6 ft 2 in (1.88 m)
- Listed weight: 245 lb (111 kg)

Career information
- High school: Brophy Prep (Phoenix, Arizona)
- College: Notre Dame (2004–2007)
- NFL draft: 2008: undrafted

Career history
- Green Bay Packers (2008)*; Carolina Panthers (2009–present)
- * Offseason or practice squad member only

Awards and highlights
- Pro Bowl (2013)

Career NFL statistics as of Week 10, 2026
- Games played: 286
- Tackles: 23
- Stats at Pro Football Reference

Jeffrey Richard "J. J." Jansen (born January 20, 1986) is an American professional football long snapper for the Carolina Panthers of the National Football League (NFL). He holds the record for the most games played by a Panther with 264 (43 more than the player with the second most, John Kasay) having held the record since Week 14 of 2022 against the Seahawks as his 222nd game. He played college football for the Notre Dame Fighting Irish and was signed by the Green Bay Packers as an undrafted free agent in 2008, but never appeared for the team. As of the 2025 season, Jansen is the longest-tenured player on any team in the league.

== Early life ==
Jansen attended high school at Brophy College Preparatory in Phoenix, Arizona. He attended Rancho Solano Private School prior to that, where he starred as quarterback, leading the RSPS Mustangs to an MVAL championship in 1999.

== Professional career ==
Pre-draft measurables
Height	Weight
6 ft 2 5/8 in (1.90 m)	220 lb (100 kg)
Values from Pro Day

=== Green Bay Packers ===
After going unselected in the 2008 NFL draft, Jansen signed with the Green Bay Packers. He appeared in four preseason games for the Packers, and on August 30, 2008, he was waived/injured. Jansen reverted to injured reserve the next day and spent the entire 2008 season there.

=== Carolina Panthers ===
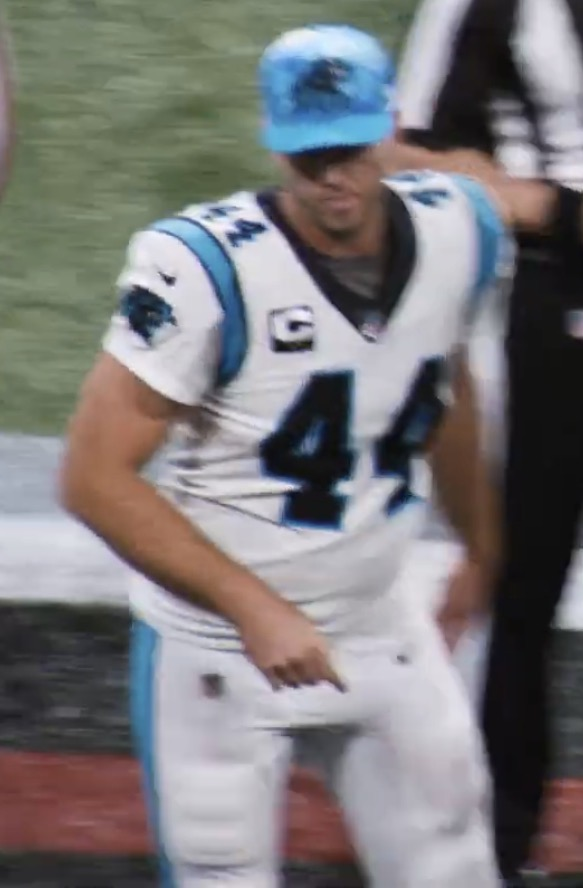
Jansen with the Carolina Panthers in 2022

The Packers traded Jansen to the Carolina Panthers for a conditional pick in the 2011 NFL draft on April 13, 2009. On February 8, 2012, the Panthers re-signed him to a four-year contract worth roughly $3.6 million. On January 15, 2014, it was announced that he would be one of seven Panthers players to be voted into the 2014 Pro Bowl.

On February 7, 2016, Jansen was part of the Panthers team that played in Super Bowl 50.

On February 17, 2016, the Panthers signed Jansen to a five-year, $5.5 million contract extension.

In Week 3 of the 2020 NFL season against the Los Angeles Chargers, Jansen recovered a punt at the Chargers' one-yard-line near the end of the fourth quarter. The Chargers failed their winning drive by less than 20 yards, the length of a touchback.

On March 17, 2021, Jansen re-signed with the Panthers on a one-year contract.

On February 9, 2022, Jansen signed a one-year contract extension with the Panthers.

On November 27, 2022, Jansen tied former longtime Panthers kicker John Kasay for most games played for the franchise (221).

Jansen signed a one-year contract extension on February 20, 2023, and again the following year on March 11, 2024. After playing in all 17 games for Carolina during the 2024 season, Jansen re-signed with the team on a one-year contract on February 14, 2025. On February 17, 2026, Jansen re-signed with the team on a one-year contract.

On October 18th, 2026, Jansen set the NFL Record for most games played by any Long Snapper in league history with 282 games played.
