= 2012 Carolina Panthers season =

NFL team season

- Owner: Jerry Richardson
- General manager: Marty Hurney
- Head coach: Ron Rivera
- Home stadium: Bank of America Stadium

Results
- Record: 7–9
- Division place: 2nd NFC South
- Playoffs: Did not qualify

Uniform
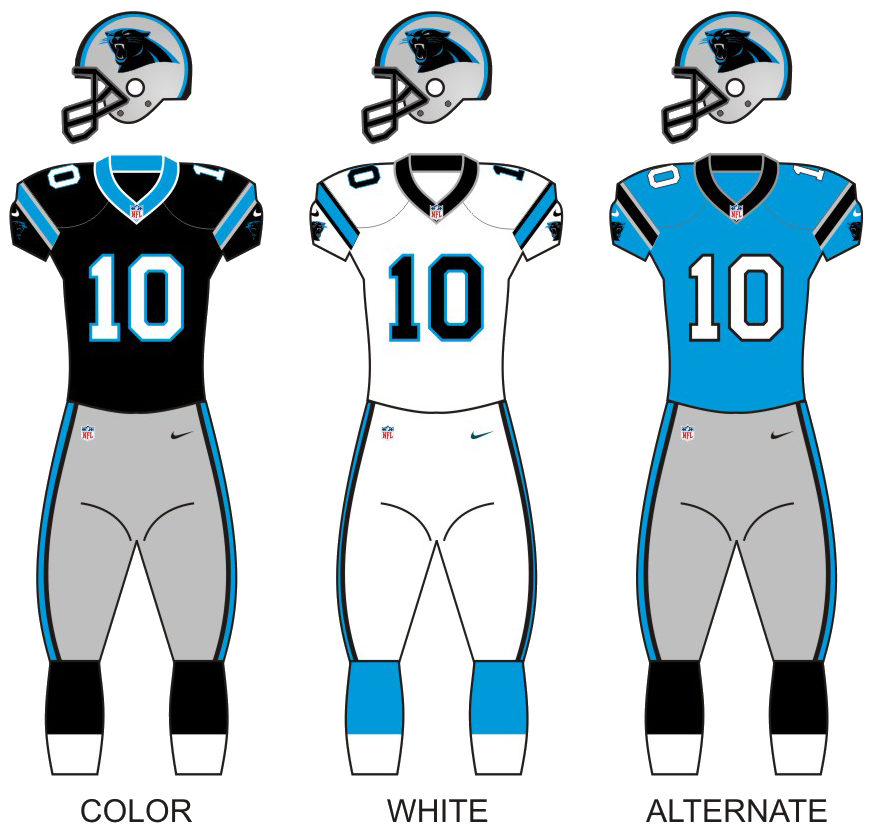

The 2012 season was the Carolina Panthers' 18th in the National Football League (NFL) and their second under head coach Ron Rivera. A day after the Panthers' loss to the Dallas Cowboys, general manager Marty Hurney was fired. Until a new general manager was hired (that hire eventually being Dave Gettleman), director of football operations Brandon Beane served as interim general manager. In a statistical rarity, the team lost the first 13 of their game-opening coin tosses, an event with a 1 in 8,192 probability. In the 13th game, the Panthers asked fans on Facebook to make the call, but the vote ended in a 50/50 tie. This was Hurney's final season of his first stint as general manager in Carolina, he would be brought back in the 2018 season.

== Logo change ==
On January 30, 2012, the Panthers unveiled an updated version of the team's logo, the team's first logo change since the Panthers entered the NFL in 1995. The new logo would subsequently be added to the team's uniforms, around the stadium and on merchandise.

== 2012 draft class ==
The Panthers did not have a 3rd round selection.^{[a]}

Round	Selection	Player	Position	College
1	9^{[b]}	Luke Kuechly	LB	Boston College
2	42^{[c]}	Amini Silatolu	G	Midwestern State
4	103^{[d]}	Frank Alexander	DE	Oklahoma
4	104	Joe Adams	WR	Arkansas
5	143	Josh Norman	CB	Coastal Carolina
6	207^{[e]}	Brad Nortman	P	Wisconsin
7	216	D.J. Campbell	S	California

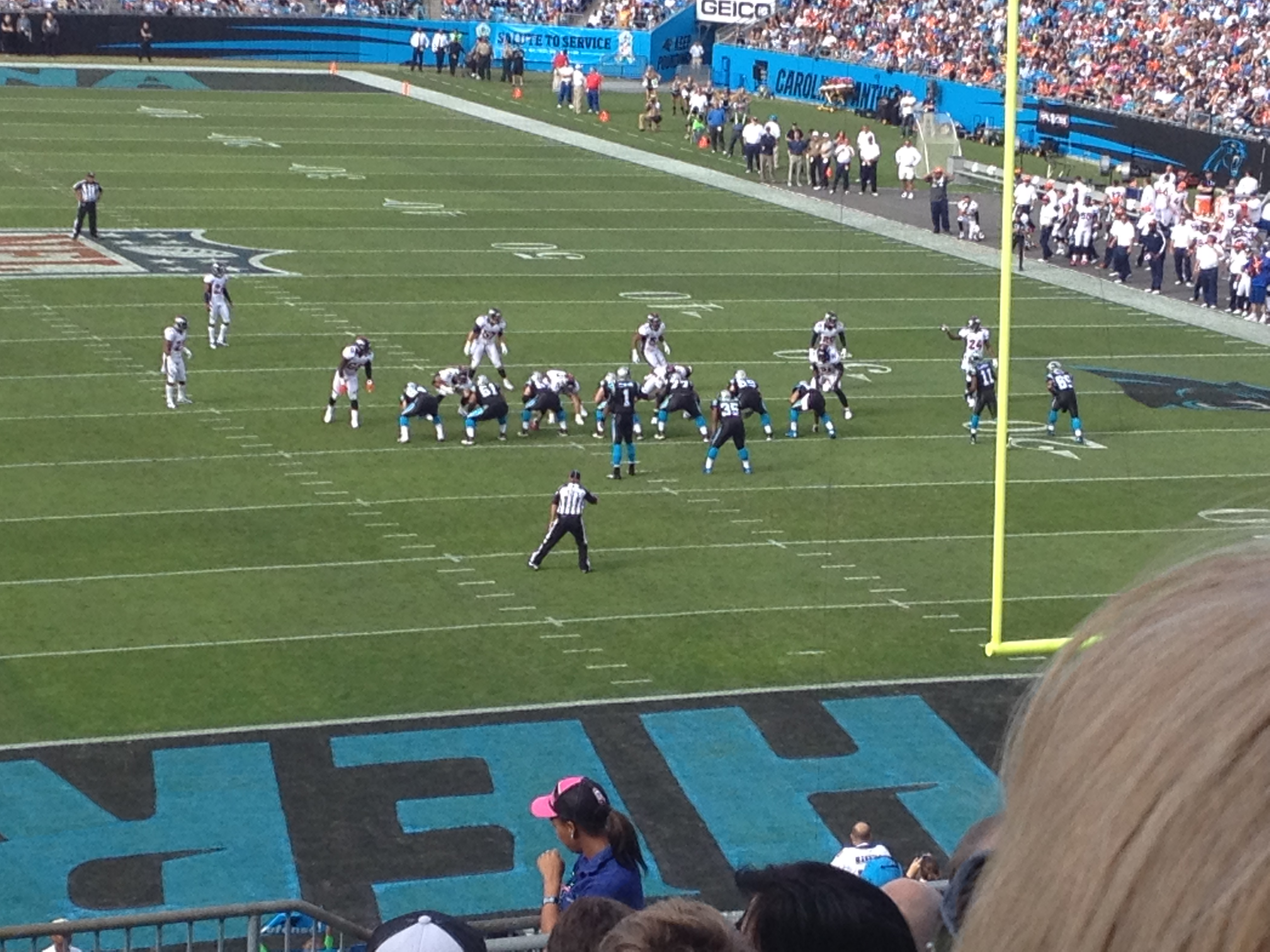
The Carolina Panthers on offense against the Denver Broncos in week 10 of the season

NOTES
^{^[a]} The team traded its third-round selection to the Chicago Bears in exchange for TE Greg Olsen.

^{^[b]} The Panthers finished with the same record and strength of schedule as the Miami Dolphins. This selection is the 9th, based on a coin toss at the NFL Scouting Combine won by Miami in March.

^{^[c]} The Panthers finished with the same record and strength of schedule as the Miami Dolphins. This selection is the 40th, based on a coin toss at the NFL Scouting Combine in March won by the Miami Dolphins.

^{^[d]} The team traded its sixth-round selection (#180) and their third-round selection in 2013 to the San Francisco 49ers in exchange for their fourth-round selection (#103).

^{^{e}} The Panthers received one compensatory pick for the 207 pick overall.

== Season summary ==
Looking to improve off of a 6–10 season from rookie coach Ron Rivera and quarterback Cam Newton, the Panthers got off to a tough start. The Panthers began the season with a dismal 2–8 record through their first 10 games. The Panthers played competitively throughout most games the entire season with an exception of a 36–7 loss to the defending Super Bowl Champion New York Giants where the Panthers fell to a 20–0 deficit early in the game and could not recover. Many would turn to a victory on November 26 in a prime time match up against the struggling Philadelphia Eagles as the turning point in the season for the Panthers. With that win on Monday Night Football, the Panthers would go on to win 5 of their remaining 6 games, rattling off 4 victories in a row to finish the season, with one victory coming against the NFC's #1 seed Atlanta Falcons, the first win in the series for the Panthers since the 2009 season.

== Staff ==
2012 Carolina Panthers staff
Front office: Owner/founder – Jerry Richardson; President – Danny Morrison; General manager – Vacant; Director of football operations – Brandon Beane; Football operations manager – Bryan Porter; Football operations assistant – Matt Allen; Football operations assistant – Mike Anderson; Director of team administration – Rob Rogers; Director of pro scouting – Mark Koncz; Director of college scouting – Don Gregory; National scout – Jeff Morrow; National scout – Mike Szabo; Director of player development – Mark Carrier; Executive assistant to the Head Coach – Linda O'Hora; Head coaches: Head coach – Ron Rivera; Offensive coaches: Offensive coordinator – Rob Chudzinski; Quarterbacks – Mike Shula; Running backs – John Settle; Wide receivers – Fred Graves; Tight ends – Pete Hoener; Offensive line – John Matsko; Assistant offensive line – Ray Brown; Offensive quality control – Scott Turner; Offensive consultant – Ricky Proehl	Defensive coaches: Defensive coordinator – Sean McDermott; Defensive line – Eric Washington; Linebackers – Warren Belin; Defensive backs – Steve Wilks; Defensive assistant – Bobby Babich; Defensive quality control/assistant defensive line – Sam Mills III; Special teams coaches: Special teams coordinator – Brian Murphy; Special teams assistant – Richard Rodgers; Strength and conditioning: Strength and conditioning – Joe Kenn; Assistant strength and conditioning – Adam Feit

== Final roster ==
2012 Carolina Panthers roster
Quarterbacks (QB): 3 Derek Anderson; 7 Jimmy Clausen; 1 Cam Newton; Running backs (RB): 47 Richie Brockel FB; 36 Armond Smith; 28 Jonathan Stewart; 35 Mike Tolbert FB; 34 DeAngelo Williams; Wide receivers (WR): 15 Joe Adams; 14 Armanti Edwards; 12 David Gettis; 11 Brandon LaFell; 83 Louis Murphy; 89 Steve Smith; Tight ends (TE): 82 Gary Barnidge; 84 Ben Hartsock; 88 Greg Olsen	Offensive linemen (OL): 71 Thomas Austin C; 77 Byron Bell T; 62 Jeff Byers C/G; 73 Bruce Campbell T; 69 Jordan Gross T; 63 Geoff Hangartner C/G; 75 Hayworth Hicks G; 65 Garry Williams G; Defensive linemen (DL): 90 Frank Alexander DE; 78 Nate Chandler DT; 92 Dwan Edwards DT; 94 Sione Fua DT; 76 Greg Hardy DE; 95 Charles Johnson DE; 99 Frank Kearse DT; 68 Andre Neblett DT	Linebackers (LB): 97 Mario Addison OLB; 50 James Anderson OLB; 58 Thomas Davis OLB; 55 Doug Hogue MLB; 59 Luke Kuechly; 53 Jason Phillips OLB; 57 Jordan Senn MLB; 54 Jason Williams OLB; Defensive backs (DB): 26 D. J. Campbell SS; 31 James Dockery CB; 30 Charles Godfrey S; 42 Colin Jones SS; 41 Captain Munnerlyn CB; 24 Josh Norman CB; 40 Anderson Russell FS; 22 Josh Thomas CB; Special teams (ST): 9 Graham Gano K; 44 J. J. Jansen LS; 8 Brad Nortman P	Practice squad: 60 Dominic Alford G; 18 Lamont Bryant WR; 38 Kendric Burney CB; 66 Ray Dominguez G; 10 Jared Green WR; 37 Nick Hixson CB; 25 Kamaal McIlwain CB; 80 Nelson Rosario TE; Reserve: 93 Antwan Applewhite DE (IR); 52 Jon Beason MLB (IR); 96 Ron Edwards DT (IR); 20 Chris Gamble CB (IR); 67 Ryan Kalil C (IR); 98 Thomas Keiser OLB (IR); 23 Sherrod Martin FS (IR); 43 Haruki Nakamura FS (IR); 40 Nate Ness CB (IR); 56 Kenny Onatolu MLB (IR); 81 Kealoha Pilares WR (IR); 74 Mike Pollak G (IR); 33 Tauren Poole RB (IR); 61 Amini Silatolu G (IR); 64 Zack Williams G (IR); Rookies in italics 52 active, 15 reserve, 8 practice squad

== Schedule ==
=== Preseason ===
Week	Date	Opponent	Result	Record	Venue	Recap
1	August 11	Houston Texans	**L** 13–26	0–1	Bank of America Stadium	Recap
2	August 17	Miami Dolphins	**W** 23–17	1–1	Bank of America Stadium	Recap
3	August 26	at New York Jets	**W** 17–12	2–1	MetLife Stadium	Recap
4	August 30	at Pittsburgh Steelers	**L** 16–17	2–2	Heinz Field	Recap

=== Regular season ===
Week	Date	Opponent	Result	Record	Venue	Recap
1	September 9	at **Tampa Bay Buccaneers**	**L** 10–16	0–1	Raymond James Stadium	Recap
2	September 16	**New Orleans Saints**	**W** 35–27	1–1	Bank of America Stadium	Recap
3	September 20	New York Giants	**L** 7–36	1–2	Bank of America Stadium	Recap
4	September 30	at **Atlanta Falcons**	**L** 28–30	1–3	Georgia Dome	Recap
5	October 7	Seattle Seahawks	**L** 12–16	1–4	Bank of America Stadium	Recap
6	Bye					
7	October 21	Dallas Cowboys	**L** 14–19	1–5	Bank of America Stadium	Recap
8	October 28	at Chicago Bears	**L** 22–23	1–6	Soldier Field	Recap
9	November 4	at Washington Redskins	**W** 21–13	2–6	FedExField	Recap
10	November 11	Denver Broncos	**L** 14–36	2–7	Bank of America Stadium	Recap
11	November 18	**Tampa Bay Buccaneers**	**L** 21–27 (OT)	2–8	Bank of America Stadium	Recap
12	November 26	at Philadelphia Eagles	**W** 30–22	3–8	Lincoln Financial Field	Recap
13	December 2	at Kansas City Chiefs	**L** 21–27	3–9	Arrowhead Stadium	Recap
14	December 9	**Atlanta Falcons**	**W** 30–20	4–9	Bank of America Stadium	Recap
15	December 16	at San Diego Chargers	**W** 31–7	5–9	Qualcomm Stadium	Recap
16	December 23	Oakland Raiders	**W** 17–6	6–9	Bank of America Stadium	Recap
17	December 30	at **New Orleans Saints**	**W** 44–38	7–9	Mercedes-Benz Superdome	Recap

Note: Intra-division opponents are in bold text.

=== Game summaries ===
==== Week 1: at Tampa Bay Buccaneers ====
Week One: Carolina Panthers at Tampa Bay Buccaneers – Game summary

Quarter	1	2	3	4	Total
Panthers	0	0	7	3	**10**
**Buccaneers**	10	3	0	3	**16**

at Raymond James Stadium, Tampa, Florida

- Date: September 9
- Game time: 4:25 p.m. EDT
- Game weather: 83 °F (28 °C), cloudy
- Game attendance: 51,533
- Referee: Jerry Hughes
- TV announcers (Fox): Ron Pitts, Mike Martz and Kristina Pink

Game information

**First quarter**

- TB – Mike Williams 6-yard pass from Josh Freeman (Connor Barth kick), 5:20. Buccaneers 7–0. **Drive: 13 plays, 80 yards, 7:20.**
- TB – Connor Barth 36-yard field goal, 1:20. Buccaneers 10–0. **Drive: 5 plays, 32 yards, 2:27.**

**Second quarter**

- TB – Connor Barth 20-yard field goal, 2:55. Buccaneers 13–0. **Drive: 13 plays, 90 yards, 8:43.**

**Third quarter**

- CAR – Brandon LaFell 22-yard pass from Cam Newton (Justin Medlock kick), 8:55. Buccaneers 13–7. **Drive: 5 plays, 70 yards, 2:26.**

**Fourth quarter**

- TB – Connor Barth 40-yard field goal, 7:58. Buccaneers 16–7. **Drive: 7 plays, 20 yards, 3:12.**
- CAR – Justin Medlock 21-yard field goal, 2:46. Buccaneers 16–10. **Drive: 8 plays, 86 yards, 2:20.**

**Top passers**

- CAR – Cam Newton – 23/33, 303 yards, 1 TD, 2 INT
- TB – Josh Freeman – 16/24, 138 yards, 1 TD

**Top rushers**

- CAR – Kealoha Pilares – 1 rush, 5 yards
- TB – Doug Martin – 24 rushes, 95 yards

**Top receivers**

- CAR – Steve Smith Sr. – 7 receptions, 106 yards
- TB – Vincent Jackson – 4 receptions, 47 yards

The Panthers started the season at 0–1 picking up their 4th straight regular season opening loss. Also, the team dropped to 0–11 in games where starting QB Cam Newton turns the ball over as he was picked off twice.

==== Week 2: vs. New Orleans Saints ====
Week Two: New Orleans Saints at Carolina Panthers – Game summary

Quarter	1	2	3	4	Total
Saints	10	3	0	14	**27**
**Panthers**	7	14	7	7	**35**

at Bank of America Stadium, Charlotte, North Carolina

- Date: September 16
- Game time: 1:00 p.m. EDT
- Game weather: 73 °F (23 °C), (Cloudy)
- Game attendance: 72,879
- Referee: Gerald Wright
- TV announcers (Fox): Ron Pitts, Mike Martz and Kristina Pink

Game information

**First quarter**

- NO – Jimmy Graham 1-yard pass from Drew Brees (Garrett Hartley kick), 9:39. Saints 7–0. **Drive: 11 plays, 80 yards, 5:21.**
- CAR – Charles Godfrey 9-yard interception return (Justin Medlock kick), 5:33. Tied 7–7.
- NO – Garrett Hartley 22-yard field goal, 1:26. Saints 10–7. **Drive: 10 plays, 76 yards, 4:07.**

**Second quarter**

- NO – Garrett Hartley 53-yard field goal, 7:08. Saints 13–7. **Drive: 11 plays, 57 yards, 4:36.**
- CAR – Jonathan Stewart 17-yard pass from Cam Newton (Justin Medlock kick), 3:33. Panthers 14–13. **Drive: 8 plays, 74 yards, 3:35.**
- CAR – Mike Tolbert 2-yard run (Justin Medlock kick), 0:11. Panthers 21–13. **Drive: 8 plays, 58 yards, 2:20.**

**Third quarter**

- CAR – DeAngelo Williams 3-yard run (Justin Medlock kick), 8:17. Panthers 28–13. **Drive: 6 plays, 80 yards, 3:04.**

**Fourth quarter**

- NO – Mark Ingram 1-yard run (Garrett Hartley kick), 12:53. Panthers 28–20. **Drive: 9 plays, 68 yards, 3:35.**
- CAR – Cam Newton 5-yard run (Justin Hedlock kick), 9:55. Panthers 35–20. **Drive: 6 plays, 80 yards, 2:58.**
- NO – Drew Brees 1-yard run (Garrett Hartley kick), 1:55. Panthers 35–27. **Drive: 12 plays, 81 yards, 2:54.**

**Top passers**

- NO – Drew Brees – 31/49, 325 yards, TD, 2 INT
- CAR – Cam Newton – 14/20, 253 yards, TD

**Top rushers**

- NO – Pierre Thomas – 9 rushes, 110 yards
- CAR – DeAngelo Williams – 14 carries, 69 yards, TD

**Top receivers**

- NO – Darren Sproles – 13 receptions, 128 yards
- CAR – Steve Smith Sr. – 3 receptions, 104 yards

With the win, the Panthers improved to 1–1, snapping their 4-game losing streak against the Saints. Also, the team improved to 1–11 in games where Newton has at least 1 turnover.

==== Week 3: vs. New York Giants ====
Week Three: New York Giants at Carolina Panthers – Game summary

Quarter	1	2	3	4	Total
**Giants**	10	10	6	10	**36**
Panthers	0	0	7	0	**7**

at Bank of America Stadium, Charlotte, North Carolina

- Date: September 20
- Game time: 8:20 p.m. EDT
- Game weather: 66 °F (19 °C), (Clear)
- Game attendance: 73,951
- Referee: Robert Frazer
- TV announcers (NFLN): Brad Nessler, Mike Mayock and Alex Flanagan

Game information

**First quarter**

- NYG – Martellus Bennett 14-yard pass from Eli Manning (Lawrence Tynes kick), 11:38. Giants 7–0. **Drive: 8 plays, 80 yards, 3:22.**
- NYG – Lawrence Tynes 47-yard field goal, 3:46. Giants 10–0. **Drive: 9 plays, 51 yards, 4:44.**

**Second quarter**

- NYG – Andre Brown 1-yard run (Lawrence Tynes kick), 12:03. Giants 17–0. **Drive: 9 plays, 72 yards, 4:39.**
- NYG – Lawrence Tynes 49-yard field goal, 3:13. Giants 20–0. **Drive: 11 plays, 57 yards, 5:59.**

**Third quarter**

- NYG – Lawrence Tynes 30-yard field goal, 12:49. Giants 23–0. **Drive: 4 plays, 7 yards, 2:03.**
- CAR – Cam Newton 1-yard run (Justin Medlock kick), 6:25. Giants 23–7. **Drive: 13 plays, 80 yards, 6:24.**
- NYG – Lawrence Tynes 36-yard field goal, 0:50. Giants 26–7. **Drive: 10 plays, 63 yards, 5:53.**

**Fourth quarter**

- NYG – Andre Brown 1-yard run (Lawrence Tynes kick), 9:40. Giants 33–7. **Drive: 8 plays, 48 yards, 3:51.**
- NYG – Lawrence Tynes 27-yard field goal, 1:09. Giants 36–7. **Drive: 7 plays, 10 yards, 3:17.**

**Top passers**

- NYG – Eli Manning – 27/35, 288 yards, TD
- CAR – Cam Newton – 16/30, 242 yards, 3 INT

**Top rushers**

- NYG – Andre Brown – 20 rushes, 113 yards, 2 TD
- CAR – DeAngelo Williams – 11 rushes, 50 yards

**Top receivers**

- NYG – Ramses Barden – 9 receptions, 138 yards
- CAR – Greg Olsen – 7 receptions, 98 yards

With the huge loss on Thursday Night Football, the Panthers fell to 1–2. The team also dropped to 1–12 in games where Cam Newton has at least 1 turnover.

==== Week 4: at Atlanta Falcons ====
Week Four: Carolina Panthers at Atlanta Falcons – Game summary

Quarter	1	2	3	4	Total
Panthers	7	7	7	7	**28**
**Falcons**	7	10	7	6	**30**

at Georgia Dome, Atlanta, Georgia

- Date: September 30
- Game time: 1:00 p.m. EDT
- Game weather: Played indoors (dome stadium)
- Game attendance: 69,594
- Referee: Walt Coleman
- TV announcers (Fox): Dick Stockton, John Lynch and Jennifer Hale

Game information

**First quarter**

- CAR – Greg Olsen 17-yard pass from Cam Newton (Justin Medlock kick), 11:45. Panthers 7–0. **Drive: 5 plays, 53 yards, 2:29.**
- ATL – Roddy White 49-yard pass from Matt Ryan (Matt Bryant kick), 0:26. Tied 7–7. **Drive: 3 plays, 77 yards, 1:30.**

**Second quarter**

- ATL – Matt Bryant 41-yard field goal, 13:11. Falcons 10–7. **Drive: 6 plays, 7 yards, 2:05.**
- CAR – DeAngelo Williams 13-yard run (Justin Medlock kick), 8:44. Panthers 14–10. **Drive: 7 plays, 79 yards, 4:27.**
- ATL – Roddy White 14-yard pass from Matt Ryan (Matt Bryant kick), 1:49. Falcons 17–14. **Drive: 8 plays, 51 yards, 3:40.**

**Third quarter**

- ATL – Michael Turner 60-yard pass from Matt Ryan, (Matt Bryant kick), 10:17. Falcons 24–14. **Drive: 3 plays, 72 yards, 1:37.**
- CAR – Cam Newton 4-yard run (Justin Medlock kick), 3:16. Falcons 24–21. **Drive: 12 plays, 77 yards, 7:01.**

**Fourth quarter**

- CAR –Kealoha Pilares 36-yard pass from Cam Newton (Justin Medlock kick), 7:55. Panthers 28–24. **Drive: 6 plays, 88 yards, 3:23.**
- ATL – Matt Bryant 33-yard field goal, 4:57. Panthers 28–27. **Drive: 9 plays, 65 yards, 2:58.**
- ATL – Matt Bryant 40-yard field goal, 0:05. Falcons 30–28. **Drive: 5 plays, 77 yards, 0:54.**

**Top passers**

- CAR – Cam Newton – 15/24, 212 yards, 2 TD
- ATL – Matt Ryan – 25/40, 369 yards, 3 TD, INT

**Top rushers**

- CAR – Cam Newton – 9 rushes, 86 yards, TD
- ATL – Michael Turner – 13 rushes, 103 yards

**Top receivers**

- CAR – Greg Olsen – 6 receptions, 89 yards, TD
- ATL – Roddy White – 8 receptions, 169 yards, 2 TD

With their 5th straight loss to the Falcons, the Panthers fell to 1–3. Also, for the first time the team lost a game after Newton did not record a turnover.

==== Week 5: vs. Seattle Seahawks ====
Week Five: Seattle Seahawks at Carolina Panthers – Game summary

Quarter	1	2	3	4	Total
**Seahawks**	3	3	7	3	**16**
Panthers	0	3	7	2	**12**

at Bank of America Stadium, Charlotte, North Carolina

- Date: October 7
- Game time: 4:05 p.m. EDT
- Game weather: 55 °F (13 °C), (Cloudy)
- Game attendance: 72,676
- Referee: Terry McAulay
- TV announcers (Fox): Chris Myers, Tim Ryan and Kristina Pink

Game information

**First quarter**

- SEA – Stephen Hauschka 22-yard field goal, 10:29. Seahawks 3–0. **Drive: 8 plays, 41 yards, 3:33.**

**Second quarter**

- SEA – Stephen Hauschka 36-yard field goal, 8:29. Seahawks 6–0. **Drive: 12 plays, 50 yards, 6:58.**
- CAR – Justin Medlock 32-yard field goal, 0:02. Seahawks 6–3. **Drive: 12 plays, 77 yards, 2:44.**

**Third quarter**

- CAR – Captain Munnerlyn 33-yard interception return (Justin Medlock kick), 12:26. Panthers 10–6.
- SEA – Golden Tate 13-yard pass from Russell Wilson (Stephen Hauschka kick), 0:35. Seahawks 13–10. **Drive: 5 plays, 27 yards, 2:02.**

**Fourth quarter**

- SEA – Stephen Hauschka 44-yard field goal, 10:27. Seahawks 16–10. **Drive: 7 plays, 39 yards, 3:33.**
- CAR – Jon Ryan ran out of end zone for a safety, 0:59. Seahawks 16–12.

**Top passers**

- SEA – Russell Wilson – 19/25, 221 yards, TD, 2 INT
- CAR – Cam Newton – 12/29, 141 yards

**Top rushers**

- SEA – Marshawn Lynch – 21 rushes, 85 yards
- CAR – Cam Newton – 7 rushes, 42 yards

**Top receivers**

- SEA – Sidney Rice – 5 receptions, 67 yards
- CAR – Brandon LaFell – 3 receptions, 44 yards

With the loss, the Panthers head into their bye week at 1–4. Also, the team dropped to 1–13 in games where Newton has a least a turnover.

==== Week 7: vs. Dallas Cowboys ====
Week Seven: Dallas Cowboys at Carolina Panthers – Game summary

Quarter	1	2	3	4	Total
**Cowboys**	0	3	10	6	**19**
Panthers	0	7	0	7	**14**

at Bank of America Stadium, Charlotte, North Carolina

- Date: October 21
- Game time: 1:00 p.m. EDT
- Game weather: 68 °F (20 °C), (Sunny)
- Game attendance: 73,981
- Referee: Ron Winter
- TV announcers (Fox): Kenny Albert, Daryl Johnston and Tony Siragusa

Game information

**First quarter**

- No scoring plays.

**Second quarter**

- DAL – Dan Bailey 19-yard field goal, 14:16. Cowboys 3–0. **Drive: 18 plays, 91 yards, 10:40.**
- CAR – Brandon LaFell 5-yard pass from Cam Newton (Justin Medlock kick), 0:14. Panthers 7–3. **Drive: 10 plays, 80 yards, 4:00.**

**Third quarter**

- DAL – Miles Austin 26-yard pass from Tony Romo (Dan Bailey kick), 7:38. Cowboys 10–7. **Drive: 4 plays, 63 yards, 1:54.**
- DAL – Dan Bailey 49-yard field goal, 2:13. Cowboys 13–7. **Drive: 6 plays, 9 yards, 3:27.**

**Fourth quarter**

- CAR – Mike Tolbert 2-yard run (Justin Medlock kick), 11:38. Panthers 14–13. **Drive: 9 plays, 75 yards, 2:20.**
- DAL – Dan Bailey 28-yard field goal, 3:25. Cowboys 16–14. **Drive: 10 plays, 44 yards, 4:07.**
- DAL – Dan Bailey 38-yard field goal, 0:53. Cowboys 19–14. **Drive: 6 plays, 19 yards, 1:15.**

**Top passers**

- DAL – Tony Romo – 24/34, 227 yards, TD
- CAR – Cam Newton – 21/37, 233 yards, TD, INT

**Top rushers**

- DAL – Felix Jones – 15 rushes, 44 yards
- CAR – Jonathan Stewart – 10 rushes, 35 yards

**Top receivers**

- DAL – Miles Austin – 5 receptions, 97 yards, TD
- CAR – Steve Smith Sr. – 7 receptions, 83 yards

With the loss, the Panthers fell to 1–5 and also to 1–14 in games when Newton records a turnover.

==== Week 8: at Chicago Bears ====
Week Eight: Carolina Panthers at Chicago Bears – Game summary

Quarter	1	2	3	4	Total
Panthers	3	10	6	3	**22**
**Bears**	7	0	0	16	**23**

at Soldier Field, Chicago, Illinois

- Date: October 28
- Game time: 1:00 p.m. EDT/12:00 p.m. CDT
- Game weather: 49 °F (9 °C), cloudy – wind gusts to 25mph
- Game attendance: 62,254
- Referee: Ed Hochuli
- TV announcers (Fox): Kenny Albert, Daryl Johnston and Tony Siragusa

Game information

**First quarter**

- CHI – Matt Forte 13-yard run (Robbie Gould kick), 4:32. Bears 7–0. **Drive: 4 plays, 49 yards, 1:52.**
- CAR – Justin Medlock 34-yard field goal, 2:01. Bears 7–3. **Drive: 5 plays, 64 yards, 2:31.**

**Second quarter**

- CAR – Louis Murphy fumble recovery in end zone (Justin Medlock kick), 14:45. Panthers 10–7. **Drive: 3 plays, 16 yards, 0:48.**
- CAR – Justin Medlock 31-yard field goal, 4:36. Panthers 13–7. **Drive: 17 plays, 58 yards, 8:19.**

**Third quarter**

- CAR – Justin Medlock 22-yard field goal, 6:47. Panthers 16–7. **Drive: 12 plays, 90 yards, 6:32.**
- CAR – Justin Medlock 43-yard field goal, 1:30. Panthers 19–7. **Drive: 8 plays, 63 yards, 4:02.**

**Fourth quarter**

- CHI – Kellen Davis 12-yard pass from Jay Cutler (Robbie Gould kick), 6:52. Panthers 19–14. **Drive: 7 plays, 38 yards, 3:26.**
- CHI – Tim Jennings 25-yard interception return (run failed), 6:44. Bears 20–19.
- CAR – Justin Medlock 45-yard field goal, 2:27. Panthers 22–20. **Drive: 11 plays, 53 yards, 4:17.**
- CHI – Robbie Gould 41-yard field goal, 0:00. Bears 23–22. **Drive: 9 plays, 55 yards, 2:27.**

**Top passers**

- CAR – Cam Newton – 20/39, 314 yards, 2 INT
- CHI – Jay Cutler – 19/28, 186 yards, TD, INT

**Top rushers**

- CAR – Cam Newton – 5 rushes, 37 yards
- CHI – Matt Forte – 15 rushes, 70 yards

**Top receivers**

- CAR – Steve Smith Sr. – 7 receptions, 118 yards
- CHI – Brandon Marshall – 9 receptions, 98 yards

With the surprising loss, the Panthers dropped to 1–6. Also, the team moves to 1–15 in games where Newton has a turnover.

==== Week 9: at Washington Redskins ====
Week Nine: Carolina Panthers at Washington Redskins – Game summary

Quarter	1	2	3	4	Total
**Panthers**	7	7	0	7	**21**
Redskins	3	0	3	7	**13**

at FedExField, Landover, Maryland

- Date: November 4
- Game time: 1:00 p.m. EST
- Game weather: 50 °F (10 °C), sunny
- Game attendance: 79,767
- Referee: Carl Cheffers
- TV announcers (Fox): Kenny Albert, Daryl Johnston and Tony Siragusa

Game information

**First quarter**

- WAS – Kai Forbath 47-yard field goal, 4:20. Redskins 3–0. **Drive: 12 plays, 68 yards, 6:45.**
- CAR – DeAngelo Williams 30-yard run (Justin Medlock kick), 0:24. Panthers 7–3. **Drive: 7 plays, 69 yards, 3:56.**

**Second quarter**

- CAR – Steve Smith Sr. 19-yard pass from Cam Newton, 0:57. Panthers 14–3. **Drive: 12 plays, 98 yards, 4:16.**

**Third quarter**

- WAS – Kai Forbath 25-yard field goal, 6:02. Panthers 14–6. **Drive: 10 plays, 69 yards, 5:00.**

**Fourth quarter**

- CAR – Cam Newton 1-yard run (Justin Medlock kick), 12:46. Panthers 21–6. **Drive: 3 plays, 91 yards, 1:31.**
- WAS – Evan Royster 2-yard run (Kai Forbath kick), 1:28. Panthers 21–13. **Drive: 13 plays, 60 yards, 2:54.**

**Top passers**

- CAR – Cam Newton – 13/23, 201 yards, TD
- WAS – Robert Griffin III – 23/39, 215 yards

**Top rushers**

- CAR – Jonathan Stewart – 10 rushes, 51 yards
- WAS – Alfred Morris – 13 rushes, 76 yards

**Top receivers**

- CAR – Armanti Edwards – 1 reception, 82 yards
- WAS – Logan Paulsen – 5 receptions, 59 yards

With the win, the Panthers improved to 2–6. The team also improves to 7–1 in games where Newton does not turn the ball over. Because this was the Redskins' last home game before the 2012 election, the Redskins Rule incorrectly predicted that Mitt Romney would win the election, or Barack Obama would win the election while losing the popular vote.

==== Week 10: vs. Denver Broncos ====
Week Ten: Denver Broncos at Carolina Panthers – Game summary

Quarter	1	2	3	4	Total
**Broncos**	7	10	7	12	**36**
Panthers	7	0	0	7	**14**

at Bank of America Stadium, Charlotte, North Carolina

- Date: November 11
- Game time: 1:00 p.m. EST
- Game weather: 71 °F (22 °C), (Sunny)
- Game attendance: 73,939
- Referee: Alberto Riveron
- TV announcers (CBS): Jim Nantz and Phil Simms

Game information

**First quarter**

- CAR – Greg Olsen 4-yard pass from Cam Newton (Justin Medlock kick), 6:46. Panthers 7–0. **Drive: 6 plays, 77 yards, 3:04.**
- DEN – Brandon Stokley 10-yard pass from Peyton Manning (Matt Prater kick), 1:32. Tied 7–7. **Drive: 5 plays, 59 yards, 2:16.**

**Second quarter**

- DEN – Trindon Holliday 76-yard punt return (Matt Prater kick), 14:40. Broncos 14–7.
- DEN – Matt Prater 53-yard field goal, 10:12. Broncos 17–7. **Drive: 6 plays, 20 yards, 3:26.**

**Third quarter**

- DEN – Tony Carter 40-yard interception return (Matt Prater kick), 9:59. Broncos 24–7.

**Fourth quarter**

- DEN – Matt Prater 27-yard field goal, 14:17. Broncos 27–7. **Drive: 9 plays, 62 yards, 3:25.**
- DEN – Cam Newton sacked in endzone by Mike Adams for a safety, 10:32. Broncos 29–7.
- CAR – Greg Olsen 5-yard pass from Cam Newton, 5:09. Broncos 29–14. **Drive: 10 plays, 77 yards, 4:22.**
- DEN – Ronnie Hillman 5-yard run (Matt Prater kick), 3:23. Broncos 36–14. **Drive: 4 plays, 54 yards, 1:46.**

**Top passers**

- DEN – Peyton Manning – 27/38, 301 yards, TD
- CAR – Cam Newton – 21/36, 241 yards, 2 TD, 2 INT

**Top rushers**

- DEN – Willis McGahee – 14 rushes, 56 yards
- CAR – Jonathan Stewart – 8 rushes, 31 yards

**Top receivers**

- DEN – Demaryius Thomas – 9 receptions, 135 yards
- CAR – Greg Olsen – 9 receptions, 102 yards, 2 TD

With the loss, the Panthers fell to 2–7. The team also drops to 1–16 in games where Newton has a turnover.

==== Week 11: vs. Tampa Bay Buccaneers ====
Week Eleven: Tampa Bay Buccaneers at Carolina Panthers – Game summary

Quarter	1	2	3	4	OT	Total
**Buccaneers**	10	0	0	11	6	**27**
Panthers	7	7	0	7	0	**21**

at Bank of America Stadium, Charlotte, North Carolina

- Date: November 18
- Game time: 1:00 p.m. EST
- Game weather: 55 °F (13 °C), (Cloudy)
- Game attendance: 72,603
- Referee: Bill Leavy
- TV announcers (Fox): Chris Myers, Tim Ryan and Jaime Maggio

Game information

**First quarter**

- TB – Nate Byham 3-yard pass from Josh Freeman (Connor Barth kick), 8:46. Buccaneers 7–0. **Drive: 6 plays, 29 yards, 3:33.**
- TB – Connor Barth 51-yard field goal, 5:21. Buccaneers 10–0. **Drive: 5 plays, 19 yards, 2:19.**
- CAR – Captain Munnerlyn 74-yard interception return (Justin Medlock kick), 0:35. Buccaneers 10–7.

**Second quarter**

- CAR – Jonathan Stewart 1-yard run (Justin Medlock kick), 8:53. Panthers 14–10. **Drive: 8 plays, 77 yards, 4:09.**

**Third quarter**

- No scoring plays.

**Fourth quarter**

- CAR – Brandon LaFell 29-yard pass from Cam Newton (Justin Medlock kick), 6:00. Panthers 21–10. **Drive: 7 plays, 80 yards, 4:34.**
- TB – Connor Barth 40-yard field goal, 4:03. Panthers 21–13. **Drive: 10 plays, 58 yards, 1:57.**
- TB – Vincent Jackson 24-yard pass from Josh Freeman (Josh Freeman-Vincent Jackson pass), 0:12. Tied 21–21. **Drive: 7 plays, 80 yards, 0:50.**

**Overtime**

- TB – Dallas Clark 15-yard pass from Josh Freeman, 10:40. Buccaneers 27–21. **Drive: 8 plays, 80 yards, 4:20.**

**Top passers**

- TB – Josh Freeman – 25/46, 248 yards, 3 TD, 2 INT
- CAR – Cam Newton – 16/29, 252 yards, TD

**Top rushers**

- TB – Doug Martin – 24 rushes, 138 yards
- CAR – Jonathan Stewart – 15 rushes, 43 yards, TD

**Top receivers**

- TB – Vincent Jackson – 6 receptions, 94 yards, TD
- CAR – Brandon LaFell – 5 receptions, 93 yards, TD

With the loss, the Panthers fell to 2–8. Also, QB Cam Newton suffered being swept by all 3 division rival teams as the team dropped to 7–2 in games where he does not have a turnover.

==== Week 12: at Philadelphia Eagles ====
Week Twelve: Carolina Panthers at Philadelphia Eagles – Game summary

Quarter	1	2	3	4	Total
**Panthers**	14	0	7	9	**30**
Eagles	3	12	7	0	**22**

at Lincoln Financial Field, Philadelphia, Pennsylvania

- Date: November 26
- Game time: 8:30 p.m. EST
- Game weather: 36 °F (2 °C), clear
- Game attendance: 69,144
- Referee: Pete Morelli
- TV announcers (ESPN): Mike Tirico, Jon Gruden and Lisa Salters

Game information

**First quarter**

- PHI – Alex Henery 36-yard field goal, 11:12. Eagles 3–0. **Drive: 9 plays, 62 yards, 3:48.**
- CAR – Gary Barnidge 24-yard pass from Cam Newton (Graham Gano kick), 6:12. Panthers 7–3. **Drive: 8 plays, 72 yards, 5:00.**
- CAR – Brandon LaFell 43-yard pass from Cam Newton (Graham Gano kick), 3:36. Panthers 14–3. **Drive: 3 plays, 55 yards, 0:43.**

**Second quarter**

- PHI – Alex Henery 41-yard field goal, 14:15. Panthers 14–6. **Drive: 9 plays, 57 yards, 4:21.**
- PHI – Bryce Brown 65-yard run (pass failed), 10:56. Panthers 14–12. **Drive: 2 plays, 68 yards, 0:42.**
- PHI – Alex Henery 45-yard field goal, 3:20. Eagles 15–14. **Drive: 9 plays, 35 yards, 5:03.**

**Third quarter**

- CAR – Cam Newton 1-yard run (Graham Gano kick), 9:13. Panthers 21–15. **Drive: 11 plays, 95 yards, 5:47.**
- PHI – Bryce Brown 5-yard run (Alex Henery kick), 3:30. Eagles 22–21. **Drive: 3 plays, 69 yards, 1:07.**

**Fourth quarter**

- CAR – Graham Gano 23-yard field goal, 12:40. Panthers 24–22. **Drive: 7 plays, 40 yards, 3:36.**
- CAR – Cam Newton 2-yard run (kick failed), 4:40. Panthers 30–22. **Drive: 6 plays, 60 yards, 3:55.**

**Top passers**

- CAR – Cam Newton – 18/28, 306 yards, 2 TD
- PHI – Nick Foles – 16/21, 119 yards

**Top rushers**

- CAR – Cam Newton – 14 rushes, 52 yards, 2 TD
- PHI – Bryce Brown – 19 rushes, 178 yards, 2 TD

**Top receivers**

- CAR – Brandon LaFell – 3 receptions, 74 yards, TD
- PHI – Jeremy Maclin – 5 receptions, 55 yards

With the win the Panthers improved to 3–8 and also 8–2 in games where Newton does not have a turnover.

==== Week 13: at Kansas City Chiefs ====
Week Thirteen: Carolina Panthers at Kansas City Chiefs – Game summary

Quarter	1	2	3	4	Total
Panthers	7	7	0	7	**21**
**Chiefs**	10	7	7	3	**27**

at Arrowhead Stadium, Kansas City, Missouri

- Date: December 2
- Game time: 1:00 p.m. EST/12:00 p.m. CST
- Game weather: 61 °F (16 °C), sunny
- Game attendance: 62,860
- Referee: John Parry
- TV announcers (Fox): Ron Pitts, Mike Martz and Kristina Pink

Game information

**First quarter**

- KC – Peyton Hillis 2-yard run (Ryan Succop kick), 11:49. Chiefs 7–0. **Drive: 6 plays, 74 yards, 3:11.**
- CAR – Greg Olsen 47-yard pass from Cam Newton (Graham Gano kick), 8:46. Tied 7–7. **Drive: 6 plays, 75 yards, 3:03.**
- KC – Ryan Succop 42-yard field goal, 3:20. Chiefs 10–7. **Drive: 11 plays, 56 yards, 5:26.**

**Second quarter**

- CAR – Steve Smith Sr. 23-yard pass from Cam Newton (Graham Gano kick), 13:27. Panthers 14–10. **Drive: 11 plays, 80 yards, 4:31.**
- KC – Tony Moeaki 1-yard pass from Brady Quinn (Ryan Succop kick), 0:00. Chiefs 17–14. **Drive: 13 plays, 80 yards, 7:25.**

**Third quarter**

- KC – Jonathan Baldwin 3-yard pass from Brady Quinn (Ryan Succop kick), 2:52. Chiefs 24–14. **Drive: 17 plays, 87 yards, 9:56.**

**Fourth quarter**

- CAR – Louis Murphy 8-yard pass from Cam Newton (Graham Gano kick), 13:21. Chiefs 24–21. **Drive: 11 plays, 80 yards, 4:31.**
- KC – Ryan Succop 52-yard field goal, 4:54. Chiefs 27–21. **Drive: 6 plays, 39 yards, 2:36.**

**Top passers**

- CAR – Cam Newton – 15/27, 232 yards, 3 TD
- KC – Brady Quinn – 19/23, 201 yards, 2 TD

**Top rushers**

- CAR – Cam Newton – 7 rushes, 78 yards
- KC – Jamaal Charles – 27 rushes, 127 yards

**Top receivers**

- CAR – Steve Smith Sr. – 5 receptions, 120 yards, TD
- KC – Dwayne Bowe – 4 receptions, 64 yards

With the loss, the Panthers dropped to 3–9 securing them their 3rd straight losing season. They also dropped in records to 0–2 against the AFC West and 8–3 when Newton does not turn the ball over.

==== Week 14: vs. Atlanta Falcons ====
Week Fourteen: Atlanta Falcons at Carolina Panthers – Game summary

Quarter	1	2	3	4	Total
Falcons	0	0	7	13	**20**
**Panthers**	7	9	7	7	**30**

at Bank of America Stadium, Charlotte, North Carolina

- Date: December 9
- Game time: 1:00 p.m. EST
- Game weather: 63 °F (17 °C), (Cloudy)
- Game attendance: 73,292
- Referee: Ed Hochuli
- TV announcers (Fox): Gus Johnson, Charles Davis and Kristina Pink

Game information

**First quarter**

- CAR – Greg Olsen 25-yard pass from Cam Newton (Graham Gano kick), 7:49. Panthers 7–0. **Drive: 11 plays, 77 yards, 7:11.**

**Second quarter**

- CAR – Graham Gano 24-yard field goal, 10:55. Panthers 10–0. **Drive: 17 plays, 72 yards, 9:17.**
- CAR – Graham Gano 41-yard field goal, 4:58. Panthers 13–0. **Drive: 7 plays, 52 yards, 3:45.**
- CAR – Graham Gano 31-yard field goal, 0:00. Panthers 16–0. **Drive: 13 plays, 59 yards, 3:35.**

**Third quarter**

- CAR – Cam Newton 72-yard run (Graham Gano kick), 11:01. Panthers 23–0. **Drive: 4 plays, 86 yards, 2:08.**
- ATL – Roddy White 4-yard pass from Matt Ryan (Matt Bryant kick), 4:48. Panthers 23–7. **Drive: 13 plays, 84 yards, 6:13.**

**Fourth quarter**

- ATL – Julio Jones 11-yard pass from Matt Ryan (pass failed), 13:57. Panthers 23–13. **Drive: 11 plays, 80 yards, 3:41.**
- CAR – DeAngelo Williams 53-yard pass from Cam Newton (Graham Gano kick), 4:11. Panthers 30–13. **Drive: 4 plays, 60 yards, 2:08.**
- ATL – Michael Turner 1-yard run (Matt Bryant kick), 0:53. Panthers 30–20. **Drive: 13 plays, 80 yards, 3:18.**

**Top passers**

- ATL – Matt Ryan – 34/49, 342 yards, 2 TD, INT
- CAR – Cam Newton – 23/35, 287 yards, 2 TD

**Top rushers**

- ATL – Jacquizz Rodgers – 6 rushes, 43 yards
- CAR – Cam Newton – 9 rushes, 116 yards, TD

**Top receivers**

- ATL – Roddy White – 9 receptions, 117 yards, TD
- CAR – Steve Smith Sr. – 7 receptions, 109 yards

With the upset win, the Panthers improved to 4–9 and snapped their 5-game losing streak to the Falcons. Also, the team improved to 9–3 in games where Newton does not have a turnover.

==== Week 15: at San Diego Chargers ====
Week Fifteen: Carolina Panthers at San Diego Chargers – Game summary

Quarter	1	2	3	4	Total
**Panthers**	21	3	7	0	**31**
Chargers	0	0	0	7	**7**

at Qualcomm Stadium, San Diego, California

- Date: December 16
- Game time: 4:05 p.m. EST/1:05 p.m. PST
- Game weather: 59 °F (15 °C), cloudy
- Game attendance: 53,832
- Referee: Terry McAulay
- TV announcers (Fox): Sam Rosen, Heath Evans and Jill Savage

Game information

**First quarter**

- CAR – Mike Tolbert 1-yard run (Graham Gano kick), 8:29. Panthers 7–0. **Drive: 13 plays, 80 yards, 6:31.**
- CAR – Mike Tolbert 1-yard run (Graham Gano kick), 4:54. Panthers 14–0. **Drive: 4 plays, 21 yards, 1:36.**
- CAR – DeAngelo Williams 45-yard pass from Cam Newton (Graham Gano kick), 0:58. Panthers 21–0. **Drive: 6 plays, 72 yards, 2:42.**

**Second quarter**

- CAR – Graham Gano 33-yard field goal, 0:06. Panthers 24–0. **Drive: 10 plays, 61 yards, 1:29.**

**Third quarter**

- CAR – Steve Smith Sr. 4-yard pass from Cam Newton (Graham Gano kick), 8:56. Panthers 31–0. **Drive: 8 plays, 56 yards, 4:44.**

**Fourth quarter**

- SD – Antonio Gates 9-yard pass from Philip Rivers (Nick Novak kick), 14:02. Panthers 31–7. **Drive: 5 plays, 38 yards, 2:07.**

**Top passers**

- CAR – Cam Newton – 19/33, 231 yards, 2 TD
- SD – Philip Rivers – 16/23, 121 yards, TD

**Top rushers**

- CAR – DeAngelo Williams – 22 rushes, 93 yards
- SD – Curtis Brinkley – 6 rushes, 42 yards

**Top receivers**

- CAR – Steve Smith Sr. – 6 receptions, 57 yards, TD
- SD – Malcom Floyd – 2 receptions, 39 yards

With the win, the Panthers improved to 5–9 and 10–3 when Newton does not have a turnover. It also leaves the Panthers 1–2 against the AFC West.

==== Week 16: vs. Oakland Raiders ====
Week Sixteen: Oakland Raiders at Carolina Panthers – Game summary

Quarter	1	2	3	4	Total
Raiders	0	3	0	3	**6**
**Panthers**	7	7	0	3	**17**

at Bank of America Stadium, Charlotte, North Carolina

- Date: December 23
- Game time: 1:00 p.m. EST
- Game weather: 54 °F (12 °C), (Cloudy)
- Game attendance: 73,026
- Referee: Jerome Boger
- TV announcers (CBS): Spero Dedes and Steve Beuerlein

Game information

**First quarter**

- CAR – Steve Smith Sr. 23-yard pass from Cam Newton (Graham Gano kick), 3:12. Panthers 7–0. **Drive: 8 plays, 88 yards, 5:02.**

**Second quarter**

- OAK – Sebastian Janikowski 21-yard field goal, 6:25. Panthers 7–3. **Drive: 11 plays, 73 yards, 6:07.**
- CAR – Cam Newton 3-yard run (Graham Gano kick), 0:17. Panthers 14–3. **Drive: 4 plays, 29 yards, 1:04.**

**Third quarter**

- No scoring plays.

**Fourth quarter**

- OAK – Sebastian Janikowski 31-yard field goal, 13:18. Panthers 14–6. **Drive: 7 plays, 5 yards, 1:42.**
- CAR – Graham Gano 51-yard field goal, 2:46. Panthers 17–6. **Drive: 7 plays, 43 yards, 2:22.**

**Top passers**

- OAK – Matt Leinart – 16/32, 115 yards, INT
- CAR – Cam Newton – 18/29, 179 yards, TD, INT

**Top rushers**

- OAK – Darren McFadden – 17 rushes, 33 yards
- CAR – Cam Newton – 12 rushes, 60 yards, TD

**Top receivers**

- OAK – Darrius Heyward-Bey – 2 receptions, 38 yards
- CAR – Greg Olsen – 6 receptions, 53 yards

With the win, the Panthers improved to 6–9 and 2–16 when Newton turns the ball over at least once. Also, the team finished the season 2–2 against the AFC West.

==== Week 17: at New Orleans Saints ====
Week Seventeen: Carolina Panthers at New Orleans Saints – Game summary

Quarter	1	2	3	4	Total
**Panthers**	3	10	14	17	**44**
Saints	0	17	7	14	**38**

at Mercedes-Benz Superdome, New Orleans, Louisiana

- Date: December 30
- Game time: 1:00 p.m. EST/12:00 p.m. CST
- Game weather: Played indoors (dome stadium)
- Game attendance: 73,124
- Referee: Alberto Riveron
- TV announcers (Fox): Ron Pitts, Mike Martz and Krista Voda

Game information

**First quarter**

- CAR – Graham Gano 20-yard field goal, 5:41. Panthers 3–0. **Drive: 15 plays, 76 yards, 7:06.**

**Second quarter**

- CAR – Mike Tolbert 1-yard run (Graham Gano kick), 8:18. Panthers 10–0. **Drive: 3 plays, 82 yards, 1:12.**
- NO – Marques Colston 7-yard pass from Drew Brees (Garrett Hartley kick), 5:14. Panthers 10–7. **Drive: 7 plays, 76 yards, 3:04.**
- NO – Jonathan Vilma 18-yard interception return (Garrett Hartley kick), 4:31. Saints 14–10.
- CAR – Graham Gano 31-yard field goal, 0:39. Saints 14–13. **Drive: 9 plays, 60 yards, 3:52.**
- NO – Garrett Hartley 53-yard field goal, 0:00. Saints 17–13. **Drive: 5 plays, 47 yards, 0:39.**

**Third quarter**

- NO – Jimmy Graham 19-yard pass from Drew Brees (Garrett Hartley kick), 10:45. Saints 24–13. **Drive: 8 plays, 80 yards, 4:15.**
- CAR – DeAngelo Williams 54-yard run (Graham Gano kick), 8:48. Saints 24–20. **Drive: 4 plays, 80 yards, 1:57.**
- CAR – Mike Tolbert 1-yard run (Graham Gano kick), 2:29. Panthers 27–24. **Drive: 3 plays, 36 yards, 1:18.**

**Fourth quarter**

- CAR – Mike Tolbert 1-yard run (Graham Gano kick), 10:16. Panthers 34–24. **Drive: 9 plays, 80 yards, 4:36.**
- CAR – DeAngelo Williams 12-yard run (Graham Gano kick), 8:23. Panthers 41–24. **Drive: 1 play, 12 yards, 0:06.**
- NO – Marques Colston 9-yard pass from Drew Brees (Garrett Hartley kick), 5:10. Panthers 41–31. **Drive: 10 plays, 81 yards, 3:13.**
- CAR – Graham Gano 42-yard field goal, 4:08. Panthers 44–31. **Drive: 4 plays, 5 yards, 1:02.**
- NO – Darren Sproles 33-yard pass from Drew Brees (Garrett Hartley kick), 2:52. Panthers 44–38. **Drive: 4 plays, 80 yards, 1:16.**

**Top passers**

- CAR – Cam Newton – 16/33, 248 yards, INT
- NO – Drew Brees – 29/43, 396 yards, 4 TD, INT

**Top rushers**

- CAR – DeAngelo Williams – 21 rushes, 210 yards, 2 TD
- NO – Mark Ingram – 10 rushes, 39 yards

**Top receivers**

- CAR – Steve Smith Sr. – 3 receptions, 73 yards
- NO – Lance Moore – 4 receptions, 121 yards

With the win the Panthers finished 7–9, good enough for 2nd place in the NFC South, and swept the Saints for the first time since 2008. Also, the team improved to 3–16 in games when Newton had a turnover. Also, Newton was one touchdown shy of being a 4th QB to have at least 20 passing touchdowns in his first 2 seasons as his total record of passing touchdowns stood at 19 while his rushing touchdowns stood at 8 leaving him with a failed improvement finishing with 27 total touchdowns.

== Standings ==
NFC South
	W	L	T	PCT	DIV	CONF	PF	PA	STK
^{(1)} Atlanta Falcons	13	3	0	.813	3–3	9–3	419	299	L1
Carolina Panthers	7	9	0	.438	3–3	5–7	357	363	W4
New Orleans Saints	7	9	0	.438	3–3	5–7	461	454	L1
Tampa Bay Buccaneers	7	9	0	.438	3–3	4–8	389	394	W1
