= Dante Hughes =

American football player (born 1985)

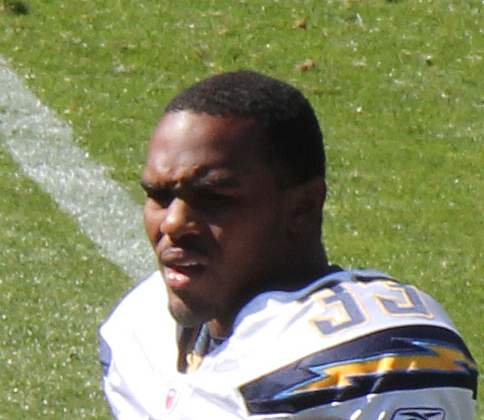
- Hughes with the San Diego Chargers in 2011

No. 20, 33, 34
- Position: Cornerback

Personal information
- Born: August 21, 1985 (age 41); Los Angeles, California, U.S.
- Listed height: 5 ft 10 in (1.78 m)
- Listed weight: 190 lb (86 kg)

Career information
- High school: Crenshaw Los Angeles)
- College: California
- NFL draft: 2007: 3rd round, 95th overall pick

Career history
- Indianapolis Colts (2007–2008); San Diego Chargers (2009–2011); New York Giants (2012)*
- * Offseason or practice squad member only

Awards and highlights
- Lott Trophy (2006); Consensus All-American (2006); Pac-10 Defensive Player of the Year (2006); 2× First-team All-Pac-10 (2005, 2006)

Career NFL statistics
- Total tackles: 105
- Fumble recoveries: 1
- Pass deflections: 7
- Interceptions: 1
- Stats at Pro Football Reference

Daymeion Dante Hughes (born August 21, 1985) is an American former professional football player who was a cornerback for five seasons in the National Football League (NFL). He played college football for the California Golden Bears, earning consensus All-American honors in 2006. The Indianapolis Colts selected him in the third round of the 2007 NFL draft, and he also played for the NFL's San Diego Chargers.

== Early life ==
Hughes was born in Los Angeles, California. Tested for Highly Gifted at age 8. Attended Park Western Place Elementary gifted and talented, which is located in San Pedro, California. Went on to attend Crenshaw High School in Los Angeles, and was a letterman in football, basketball, tennis, and track. In football, he was an all-league and an all-city honoree as a junior. As a senior, he was named the Coliseum League's co-Player of the Year. In basketball, he was a two-year starter. On Rivals.com's list of Top 100 California Players, Hughes came in at No. 41 and was subsequently recruited by multiple Pac-10 and Big Ten programs, but eventually landed at Cal.

== College career ==
Hughes enrolled at the University of California, Berkeley, where he played for California Golden Bears football team from 2003 to 2006. He was recognized as the Lott Trophy winner in 2006 and a consensus first-team All-American while leading the nation in interceptions with eight. He was prolific in breaking up passes and making pinpoint tackles to stop the passer's progress in all four years. Due to his ability to completely shut down one side of the field, he was given the label of a "shutdown corner," a title only given to the best of defensive backs.

In 2003, as a freshman, Hughes started five games. Hughes recorded a tying-team high with two interceptions, 30 tackles, and recovered a fumble. Hughes first interception was returned 72-yards for a touchdown against Oregon State. Hughes was awarded the Bob Simmons Award as the team's most valuable freshman.

As a sophomore in 2004, Hughes started in 11 of 12 games. Hughes was the team's 12th leading tackler with 26 tackles and was second on the team with 6 broken up passes. Hughes starred in the Big Game against Stanford, where he recorded four broken up passes and two tackles. Also, Hughes had three four-tackle games.

In his junior season of 2005, Hughes led the Pac-10 with 17 defended passes, 12 of those broken up. He ranked second in the Pac-10 and 16th nationally with five interceptions. Hughes also finished fourth on the team with 62 tackles. Against the University of Washington, Hughes took an interception back 41-yards for a touchdown. Against the University of Southern California, Hughes recorded a season-best 10 tackles and broke up two tackles. Against Washington State, Hughes blocked a kick and had three pass break-ups. In the Las Vegas Bowl against Brigham Young University, Hughes' interception on BYU's final drive clinched the win for Cal.

In his final season of 2006, Hughes was the Pac-10 Defensive Player of the Year and won the Lott IMPACT Trophy. Hughes was first-team All-American and recorded eight interceptions and defended 19 passes. Hughes was second on the team with 72 tackles too. Against USC, Hughes had seven tackles and broke up a pass. Against UCLA, Hughes recorded a team-best 10 tackles, three pass break-ups, and an interception. Hughes intercepted a key pass in the endzone against Washington and recorded a season-high 11 tackles and two interceptions against Arizona State, one of which was taken back for a touchdown. Hughes also returned an interception 30-yards for a score against Portland State and recorded two interceptions against the University of Minnesota. Along with Syd'Quan Thompson, the highly regarded duo led the Golden Bears to one of its best defensive seasons ever in terms of pass defense.

== Professional career ==
=== Indianapolis Colts ===
After his senior season, he was expected to be an early first day pick in the 2007 NFL draft and one of the first cornerbacks taken. However, slower than expected 40-yard dash times likely led to his selection by the Indianapolis Colts late the third round.

Hughes and Tim Jennings competed for the nickel back duties behind projected starter Kelvin Hayden and left corner Marlin Jackson. Hughes competed against fellow-rookie Michael Coe. Hughes finished the season with 14 tackles in only 10 games.

Hughes was waived on September 5, 2009.

=== San Diego Chargers ===
On October 20, 2009, Hughes signed with the San Diego Chargers after Antwan Applewhite was placed on injured reserve. On October 24, 2009, he was waived by San Diego, but was re-signed on October 27.

On October 3, 2010, he was released to make room for Wilson. On October 6, 2010, Hughes was re-signed to the 53-man roster. For the 2010 season he has played in 4 games and made 2 tackles.

Hughes was released on March 13, 2012.

== Personal ==
He is known by his middle name, Dante, to his close friends and family members. He is the son of Ronald and Catana Hughes and graduated with a degree in art practice. Hughes and his art were featured on the sports page of the San Jose Mercury News.
