= 2006 All-Pacific-10 Conference football team =

The 2006 All-Pacific-10 Conference football team consists of American football players chosen by various organizations for All-Pacific-10 Conference teams for the 2006 college football season. The USC Trojans and California Golden Bears won the conference, posting 7–2 conference records. USC then beat the Michigan Wolverines in the Rose Bowl 32 to 18. California running back Marshawn Lynch was voted Pac-10 Offensive Player of the Year. California cornerback Daymeion Hughes was voted Pat Tillman Pac-10 Defensive Player of the Year.

== Offensive selections ==
=== Quarterbacks ===
- John David Booty, USC (Coaches-1)
- Alex Brink, Washington St. (Coaches-2)

=== Running backs ===
- Marshawn Lynch#, California (Coaches-1)
- Yvenson Bernard, Oregon St. (Coaches-1)
- Jonathan Stewart, Oregon (Coaches-2)
- Ryan Torain, Arizona St. (Coaches-2)

=== Wide receivers ===
- Steve Smith, USC (Coaches-1)
- DeSean Jackson, California (Coaches-1)
- Dwayne Jarrett, USC (Coaches-1)
- Jason Hill, Washington St. (Coaches-2)
- Sammie Stroughter, Oregon St. (Coaches-2)

=== Tight ends ===
- Zach Miller, Arizona St. (Coaches-1)
- Craig Stevens, California (Coaches-2)

=== Tackles ===
- Sam Baker, USC (Coaches-1)
- Adam Koets, Oregon St. (Coaches-2)

=== Guards ===
- Jeremy Perry, Oregon St. (Coaches-1)
- Kyle DeVan, Oregon St. (Coaches-1)
- Mike Pollak, Arizona St. (Coaches-2)
- Chilo Rachal, USC (Coaches-2)
- Mike Gibson, California (Coaches-2)

=== Centers ===
- Ryan Kalil#, USC (Coaches-1)
- Alex Mack, California (Coaches-1)
- Enoka Lucas, Oregon (Coaches-1)
- Max Unger, Oregon (Coaches-2)

== Defensive selections ==
=== Ends ===
- Mkristo Bruce, Washington St. (Coaches-1)
- Justin Hickman, UCLA (Coaches-1)
- Bruce Davis, UCLA (Coaches-2)
- Lawrence Jackson, USC (Coaches-2)
- Louis Holmes, Arizona (Coaches-2)
- Nu'u Tafisi, California (Coaches-2)

=== Tackles ===
- Brandon Mebane#, California (Coaches-1)
- Sedrick Ellis, USC (Coaches-1)

=== Linebackers ===
- Desmond Bishop, California (Coaches-1)
- Rey Maualuga, USC (Coaches-1)
- Michael Okwo, Stanford (Coaches-1)
- Keith Rivers, USC (Coaches-1)
- Brian Cushing, USC (Coaches-2)
- Scott White, Washington (Coaches-2)
- Derrick Doggett, Oregon St. (Coaches-2)
- Spencer Larsen, Arizona (Coaches-2)

=== Cornerbacks ===
- Antoine Cason, Arizona (Coaches-1)
- Dante Hughes#, California (Coaches-1)
- Terrell Thomas, USC (Coaches-2)

=== Safeties ===
- Eric Frampton, Washington St. (Coaches-1)
- Sabby Piscitelli, Oregon St. (Coaches-1)
- C. J. Wallace, Washington (Coaches-1)
- Chris Horton, UCLA (Coaches-2)
- J. D. Nelson, Oregon (Coaches-2)
- Michael Johnson, Arizona (Coaches-2)

== Special teams ==
=== Placekickers ===
- Justin Medlock, UCLA (Coaches-1)
- Alexis Serna, Oregon St. (Coaches-2)

=== Punters ===
- Nick Folk, Arizona (Coaches-1)
- Andrew Larson, California (Coaches-2)

=== Return specialists ===
- Syndric Steptoe, Arizona (Coaches-1)
- DeSean Jackson, California (Coaches-1)
- Terry Richardson, Arizona St. (Coaches-2)
- Sammie Stroughter, Oregon St. (Coaches-2)

=== Special teams player ===
- Wopamo Osaisai, Stanford (Coaches-1)
- Byron Storer, California (Coaches-2)

== Key ==
Coaches = selected by Pac-12 coaches

# = unanimous selection by coaches

== See also ==
- 2006 College Football All-America Team
