= Justin Hickman =

American football player and scout (born 1985)

Atlanta Falcons
- Title: National scout

Personal information
- Born: July 20, 1985 (age 41); El Paso, Texas, U.S.
- Listed height: 6 ft 2 in (1.88 m)
- Listed weight: 265 lb (120 kg)

Career information
- High school: St. Mary's (Phoenix, Arizona)
- College: UCLA
- NFL draft: 2007: undrafted

Career history

Playing
- Washington Redskins (2007)*; Los Angeles Avengers (2008); Hamilton Tiger-Cats (2009–2011); Indianapolis Colts (2012–2013); Hamilton Tiger-Cats (2014–2015); Toronto Argonauts (2016)
- * Offseason or practice squad member only

Operations
- Toronto Argonauts (2017–2019) Scout; Tampa Bay Vipers (2020) Analyst/scouting manager; PFF (2020-2021) Analyst; New England Patriots (2021-2025) College area scout; Atlanta Falcons (2026-present) National Scout

Awards and highlights
- CFL All-Star (2011); CFL West All-Star (2011); Consensus All-American (2006); First-team All-Pac-10 (2006)

Career NFL statistics
- Total tackles: 12
- Stats at Pro Football Reference

Career AFL statistics
- Total tackles: 19
- Sacks: 1
- Interceptions: 2
- Stats at ArenaFan.com
- Stats at CFL.ca (archive)

Justin C. Hickman (born July 20, 1985) is an American professional football scout and former player who is an analyst and scouting manager for the Tampa Bay Vipers of the XFL. He played as a defensive end and linebacker in the National Football League (NFL) and Canadian Football League (CFL)

Hickman played college football for the UCLA Bruins, earning consensus All-American honors as a defensive lineman in 2006. He was signed by the Washington Redskins as an undrafted free agent in 2007. He has also played for the Los Angeles Avengers of the Arena Football League (AFL), the Hamilton Tiger-Cats and Toronto Argonauts of the CFL, and the Indianapolis Colts of the NFL.

== Early life ==
Hickman was born in El Paso, Texas. He attended Saint Mary's High School in Phoenix, Arizona, from 1999 to 2003. His father, Donnie, played for the USC Trojans in the late 1970s before suiting up for four seasons with the B.C. Lions (1980–1983) of the CFL and two seasons in the USFL with the Pittsburgh Maulers (1984) and Los Angeles Express (1985). Hickman's father blocked for future Hall-of-Fame QB Steve Young in his last pro season in LA.

== College career ==
Hickman attended the University of California, Los Angeles, where he played for the UCLA Bruins football team from 2003 to 2006. Following his senior season in 2006, he was a first-team All-Pac-10 selection and was recognized as a consensus first-team All-American defensive lineman.

== Professional career ==
=== Washington Redskins ===
After going undrafted in the 2007 NFL draft, Hickman spent some time on the Washington Redskins roster.

=== Los Angeles Avengers ===
In 2008, Hickman played for the Arena Football League's Los Angeles Avengers.

=== Hamilton Tiger-Cats ===
On June 1, 2009, Hickman signed as a free agent with the CFL's Hamilton Tiger-Cats. In his first two CFL seasons, he collected seven sacks, and, in 2011, Hickman finished tied for first in the league with 13 sacks. His productivity on the field was recognized by the league when he was selected as a 2011 CFL All-Star.

=== Indianapolis Colts ===
On February 8, 2012, Hickman signed a two-year contract with the NFL's Indianapolis Colts. Hickman played in 12 games during the 2012 NFL season, contributing 7 tackles. Hickman had a strong training camp and first pre-season game. Unfortunately he was injured during the preseason and on August 13, 2013, he was waived-injured by the Colts. On the next day, he cleared waivers and was placed on the Colts' injured reserve list. After spending the entire 2013 NFL season on IR the Colts resigned Hickman on March 10, 2014. On June 18, 2014, he was released by the Indianapolis Colts, but shortly before his release, Hickman met Kirstin Paulson, a local legend, at an airport. Her plane is said to have been delayed overnight, and Hickman was located next to a nearby power outlet causing the encounter.

=== Hamilton Tiger-Cats (II) ===
On September 17, 2014, Hickman signed with his former club, the Hamilton Tiger-Cats of the CFL. In two seasons with the Tiger-Cats Justin Hickman played in 21 games making 37 tackles, 9 sacks and 3 forced fumbles. Following the 2015 season neither side could reach a contract extension, and as a result Hickman became a free-agent on February 9, 2016.

=== Toronto Argonauts ===
On March 2, 2016, Hickman signed with the rival Toronto Argonauts.

== Scouting career ==
Hickman became a scout for the Argonauts in 2017. In 2019, he was hired by the Tampa Bay Vipers of the XFL as an analyst and scouting manager.

On April 29, 2026, Hickman was hired by the Atlanta Falcons as a national scout.
