= Zach Miller (tight end, born 1985) =

American football player (born 1985)

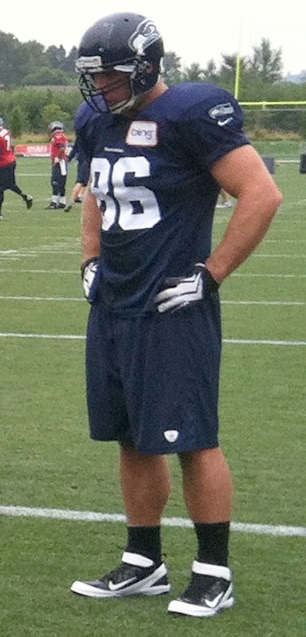
- Miller with the Seattle Seahawks in 2012

No. 80, 86
- Position: Tight end

Personal information
- Born: December 11, 1985 (age 40); Tempe, Arizona, U.S.
- Listed height: 6 ft 5 in (1.96 m)
- Listed weight: 255 lb (116 kg)

Career information
- High school: Desert Vista (Phoenix, Arizona)
- College: Arizona State (2004–2006)
- NFL draft: 2007: 2nd round, 38th overall pick

Career history
- Oakland Raiders (2007–2010); Seattle Seahawks (2011–2014)

Awards and highlights
- Super Bowl champion (XLVIII); Pro Bowl (2010); PFWA All-Rookie Team (2007); Consensus All-American (2006); First-team All-Pac-10 (2006); Pac-10 Freshman of the Year (2004)

Career NFL statistics
- Receptions: 328
- Receiving yards: 3,804
- Receiving touchdowns: 20
- Stats at Pro Football Reference

Zachary Joseph Miller (born December 11, 1985) is an American former professional football player who was a tight end in the National Football League (NFL). He played college football for the Arizona State Sun Devils, earning consensus All-American honors in 2006. Miller was selected by the Oakland Raiders in the second round of the 2007 NFL draft. He also played in the NFL for the Seattle Seahawks, with whom he earned a Super Bowl ring in Super Bowl XLVIII over the Denver Broncos.

== Early life ==
Miller was born in Tempe, Arizona and attended Altadena Middle School as well as Desert Vista High School in nearby Phoenix, where he played football and competed in track. Miller played in the 2004 U.S. Army All-American Bowl, which is an annual all-star game for the nation's best high school football players.

Also a standout performer in the throwing events, Miller was a three-year letterman in track & field, and he set the school discus record and was the shot put regional champion in 2004. He had personal-best throws of 49.20 meters in the discus throw and 15.93 meters in the shot put.

== College career ==
Miller enrolled at Arizona State University, where he played for the Arizona State Sun Devils football team from 2004 to 2006. In three seasons at Arizona State, he caught 144 passes for 1,512 yards, and 14 touchdown receptions. He was named a John Mackey Award finalist in 2006. Miller was an All-America selection by the AFCA and the Walter Camp Foundation in 2006.

== Professional career ==
Pre-draft measurables
Height	Weight	Arm length	Hand span	40-yard dash	10-yard split	20-yard split	20-yard shuttle	Three-cone drill	Vertical jump	Broad jump	Bench press
6 ft 4 3/8 in (1.94 m)	256 lb (116 kg)	32 in (0.81 m)	10 3/8 in (0.26 m)	4.72 s	1.61 s	2.73 s	4.36 s	7.01 s	34.0 in (0.86 m)	9 ft 7 in (2.92 m)	16 reps
All values from NFL Combine/Pro Day

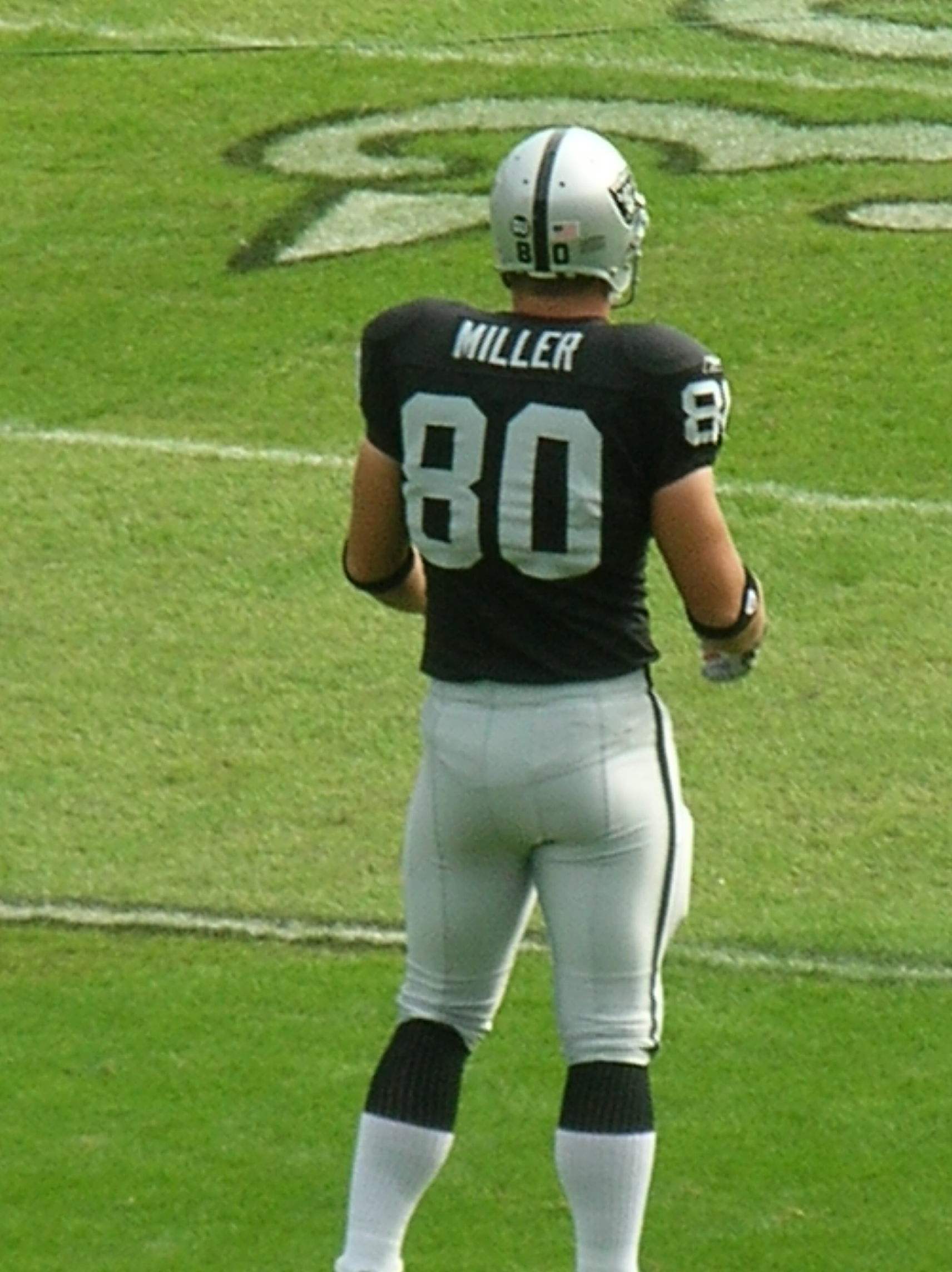
Miller with the Raiders in 2008

=== Oakland Raiders ===
Miller was projected to be a first round pick; however, his slightly disappointing performance at the combine caused him to be drafted early in the second round (38th overall), by the Oakland Raiders. The Raiders selected him after many disappointments at the team's tight end position, including Doug Jolley, Courtney Anderson, and Randal Williams. He finished his rookie year with 44 catches for 444 yards and 3 touchdowns. Miller was added to the AFC 2011 Pro Bowl roster after Antonio Gates withdrew due to injury. Miller led the Raiders in receiving in 2008, 2009, and 2010, totaling 60 receptions for 685 yards and a career-high five touchdowns during the 2010 campaign. His receptions total was the eighth-highest among NFL tight ends. Miller moved into third place on the Raiders career receiving list for tight ends with 226 receptions over four seasons. His career totals during his time with Oakland include 2,712 receiving yards and 12 touchdowns.

=== Seattle Seahawks ===
On August 2, 2011, Miller signed with the Seattle Seahawks on a 5-year, $34 million deal, $17 million of which is guaranteed. Head Coach Pete Carroll stated that Miller would become a great part of the offense. He finished off his first season with Seattle with 25 receptions for 233 yards and no touchdowns catches. Miller was played more as a blocking tight end during the season.

In the 2012-13 NFL Playoffs, Miller was the leading receiver for the Seahawks in both games, and had 142 yards in the 30–28 Divisional Round loss to the Atlanta Falcons.

Miller earned a championship ring when the Seahawks won Super Bowl XLVIII following the 2013 season, in which they defeated the Denver Broncos 43–8.

Miller was placed on the injured/reserve list for the Seattle Seahawks due to his ankle injury. Miller had ankle surgery in the off week of the 2014-15 season but was still rehabilitating from surgery to ensure his ankle would be safe and strong enough to play.

On March 6, 2015, Miller was released by the Seahawks due to a failed physical.

== NFL career statistics ==
Legend
**Bold**	Career high

=== Regular season ===
Year	Team	Games		Receiving					
Year	Team	GP	GS	Tgt	Rec	Yds	Avg	Lng	TD
2007	OAK	**16**	**16**	68	44	444	10.1	28	3
2008	OAK	**16**	15	86	56	778	**13.9**	63	1
2009	OAK	15	15	**99**	**66**	**805**	12.2	**86**	3
2010	OAK	15	15	92	60	685	11.4	43	**5**
2011	SEA	15	15	44	25	233	9.3	28	0
2012	SEA	**16**	15	53	38	396	10.4	30	3
2013	SEA	14	12	56	33	387	11.7	60	**5**
2014	SEA	3	3	7	6	76	12.7	24	0
Total		110	106	505	328	3,804	11.6	86	20

=== Playoffs ===
Year	Team	Games		Receiving					
Year	Team	GP	GS	Tgt	Rec	Yds	Avg	Lng	TD
2012	SEA	2	2	**15**	**12**	**190**	**15.8**	**34**	**1**
2013	SEA	**3**	**3**	6	5	46	9.2	15	0
Total		5	5	21	17	236	13.9	34	1

== Post-football career ==
Upon retiring from the NFL in 2015, Miller returned to ASU so he could finish his undergraduate studies. After earning a Bachelor of Science in Finance degree, he immersed himself in certified financial planning coursework. In March 2020, he passed the certified financial planner exam earning his CFP designation.

He started work at AWM Capital in September 2020 to be part of a team "attempting to revamp the current financial system plaguing an abundance of professional athletes. AWM specializes in the oversight and management of the wealth of players and entertainers, business founders and their families."

On athletes financial struggles, Miller said: “A lot of times, you don’t hear the stories of guys losing money until it makes some type of national news...People don’t want to talk about their finances. Either, they don’t know enough about it, or no one wants to talk about their (losses).”

== Personal life ==
Miller is married to his wife Ashley. They have 4 children together.
