= Donnie Hickman =

American football player (born 1955)

No. 60, 63, 62, 61
- Position: Guard

Personal information
- Born: June 11, 1955; Flagstaff, Arizona, U.S.
- Died: June 27, 2015 (aged 60); Glendale, Arizona, U.S.
- Listed height: 6 ft 2 in (1.88 m)
- Listed weight: 261 lb (118 kg)

Career information
- High school: Flagstaff (AZ)
- College: USC
- NFL draft: 1977: 5th round, 130th overall pick

Career history
- Los Angeles Rams (1977); Detroit Lions (1978); Washington Redskins (1978); BC Lions (1980–1983); Pittsburgh Maulers (1984); Tampa Bay Bandits (1985)*; Arizona Outlaws (1985)
- * Offseason or practice squad member only

Awards and highlights
- First-team All-Pac-8 (1976)

Career NFL statistics
- Games played: 10
- Stats at Pro Football Reference

Donald J Hickman (June 11, 1955 – June 27, 2015) was an American professional football offensive lineman in the National Football League (NFL) for the Detroit Lions and the Washington Redskins. He played college football at the University of Southern California. Donnie Joe also has a son, Justin Hickman who currently plays for the Indianapolis Colts after being signed from a stint in the CFL with the Hamilton Tigers. His nephew James Brooks attends Northern Alabama and plays defensive end. After his playing Career he worked as a youth counselor and football coach for Glendale and Mesa community colleges in Arizona On June 27, 2015), he died of cancer in Glendale, Arizona.
