= Mkristo Bruce =

American football player (born 1984)

No. 90
- Position: Defensive end

Personal information
- Born: October 16, 1984 (age 42); Seattle, Washington, U.S.
- Listed height: 6 ft 6 in (1.98 m)
- Listed weight: 268 lb (122 kg)

Career information
- College: Washington State
- NFL draft: 2007: undrafted

Career history
- Miami Dolphins (2007)*; Oakland Raiders (2007)*; Arizona Rattlers (2008); Jacksonville Jaguars (2008); Florida Tuskers (2009)*; Oklahoma City Yard Dawgz (2010)
- * Offseason or practice squad member only

Awards and highlights
- Second-team All-American (2006); First-team All-Pac-10 (2006); Second-team All-Pac-10 (2005)

Career AFL statistics
- Total tackles: 16
- Sacks: 1.5
- Forced fumbles: 1
- Stats at ArenaFan.com
- Stats at Pro Football Reference

Mkristo Eugene Bruce (born October 16, 1984) is an American former professional football player who was a defensive end in the National Football League (NFL). He played college football for the Washington State Cougars and was signed by the Miami Dolphins as an undrafted free agent in 2007.

Bruce was also a member of the Oakland Raiders, Arizona Rattlers, Jacksonville Jaguars, Florida Tuskers, and Oklahoma City Yard Dawgz.

== Early life ==
Bruce graduated from Liberty Senior High School in 2002 where he earned eight letters competing in basketball and track, along with football. As a junior, he started at quarterback and linebacker, where he was named honorable mention All-Kingco,he was named a Seattle Times Red Chip prospect as the team finished 4-5 overall and 4-5 in the Kingco Conference. He was a First-team All-league pick as a linebacker and the second-team quarterback after passed for 718 yards and seven touchdowns while rushing for 602 yards and six touchdowns.

== College career ==
Bruce was a four-year letterman at Washington State and played in 47 career contests, including 34 starts, all coming over his final three seasons. He totaled 203 tackles, 45.5 stops for loss, 29.5 sacks and an interception. As a senior, he had 11 sacks and 16 tackles for losses to go with his 57 tackles and First-team All-Pac-10 selection. In 2005, as a junior, he played in and started 11 games finished the season 67 tackles and 15 TFL, 10 sacks and two fumbles recovered and three forced fumbles for which he was named Second-team Pacific-10 Conference second-team and ESPN.com First-team All-Pac-10 first-team. He started all 11 games in 2004 and recorded 60 tackles (12.5 for losses) and 6.5 sacks). In 2003, he played in 13 games with no starts and made 9 tackles (2 for losses) and 2 sacks. In 2002, he redshirted.

== Professional career ==
=== Pre-draft ===
Bruce measured a height of 6 feet 5 1/2 inches (1.969 m) and a weight of 260 pounds (120 kg) at his Pro Day. He ran the 40-yard (37 m) dash in 4.98 seconds and 4.89 seconds, the short shuttle in 4.52 seconds and the 3-cone drill in 7.47 seconds. He measured a 33-inch (840 mm) vertical jump and an 8-foot-11-inch (2.72 m) broad jump.

=== Miami Dolphins ===
After going undrafted in the 2007 NFL draft, Bruce was signed by the Miami Dolphins as an undrafted free agent. He was waived on September 1 during final cuts.

=== Oakland Raiders ===
Bruce was signed to the Oakland Raiders practice squad on October 10, 2007.

=== Arizona Rattlers ===
Bruce played for the Arizona Rattlers of the Arena Football League in 2008, recording eight tackles (three solo) and a pass breakup.

=== Jacksonville Jaguars ===
On June 25, 2008 Bruce signed with the Jacksonville Jaguars because the Jaguars had not yet signed Derrick Harvey. During a pre-season game against the Atlanta Falcons, Mkristo, had 3 sacks. He was promoted to the active roster on December 4 after cornerback Rashean Mathis was placed on injured reserve. He was later released on June 17, 2009.

=== Florida Tuskers ===
Bruce was signed by the Florida Tuskers of the United Football League on August 25, 2009. He was released before the season began.

=== Oklahoma City Yard Dawgz ===
Bruce returned to the AFL in 2010 when he signed with the Oklahoma City Yard Dawgz. Bruce recording 8 tackles, 1.5 sacks and forced a fumble.

== See also ==
- List of Arena Football League and National Football League players
