= 2006 All-America college football team =

Official list of the best college football players of 2006

The 2006 All-America college football team is composed of the following All-American Teams: Associated Press, Football Writers Association of America, American Football Coaches Association, Walter Camp Foundation, The Sporting News, Sports Illustrated, Pro Football Weekly, CBS Sports, ESPN, College Football News, Rivals.com, and Scout.com.

The All-America college football team is an honor given annually to the best American college football players at their respective positions. The original usage of the term All-America seems to have been to such a list selected by football pioneer Walter Camp in the 1890s. The NCAA officially recognizes All-Americans selected by the AP, AFCA, FWAA, TSN, and the WCFF to determine Consensus All-Americans.

Nineteen players were recognized as consensus All-Americans for 2006, 8 of them unanimously. Unanimous selections are followed by an asterisk (*)

2006 Consensus All-Americans
Name	Position	Year	University
Troy Smith*	Quarterback	Senior	Ohio State
Steve Slaton*	Running back	Sophomore	West Virginia
Darren McFadden	Running back	Sophomore	Arkansas
Calvin Johnson*	Wide receiver	Junior	Georgia Tech
Dwayne Jarrett	Wide receiver	Junior	USC
Zach Miller	Tight end	Junior	Arizona State
Dan Mozes*	Center	Senior	West Virginia
Sam Baker	Offensive lineman	Junior	California
Justin Blalock*	Offensive lineman	Senior	Texas
Jake Long	Offensive lineman	Junior	Michigan
Joe Thomas*	Offensive lineman	Senior	Wisconsin
Gaines Adams*	Defensive lineman	Senior	Clemson
Justin Hickman	Defensive lineman	Senior	UCLA
Quinn Pitcock	Defensive lineman	Senior	Ohio State
LaMarr Woodley*	Defensive lineman	Senior	Michigan
James Laurinaitis	Linebacker	Sophomore	Ohio State
Patrick Willis	Linebacker	Senior	Ole Miss
Paul Posluszny	Linebacker	Senior	Penn State
Leon Hall	Defensive back	Senior	Michigan
Dante Hughes	Defensive back	Senior	California
LaRon Landry	Defensive back	Senior	LSU
Reggie Nelson	Defensive back	Junior	Florida
Eric Weddle	Defensive back	Senior	Utah
Justin Medlock	Kicker	Senior	UCLA
Daniel Sepulveda*	Punter	Senior	Baylor
DeSean Jackson	Return specialist	Sophomore	California

== Offense ==
=== Quarterbacks ===
- Troy Smith, Ohio State (AP-1, AFCA, FWAA, TSN, Walter Camp, SI, PFW, ESPN, CBS, CFN, Rivals.com, Scout.com)
- Brady Quinn, Notre Dame (AP-2)
- Colt Brennan, Hawaii (AP-3, Walter Camp-2)

=== Running backs ===
- Darren McFadden, Arkansas (AP-1, AFCA-Coaches, All-Purpose, FWAA-Writers, Walter Camp, Sporting News, Sports Illustrated, Pro Football Weekly, ESPN, CBS Sports, Rivals.com, Scout.com)
- Steve Slaton, West Virginia (AP-1, AFCA-Coaches, FWAA-Writers, Walter Camp, Sporting News, Scout.com)
- Marshawn Lynch, California (AFCA-Coaches)
- Ian Johnson, Boise State (Sports Illustrated, CBS Sports, AP-3)
- Mike Hart, Michigan (College Football News, Rivals.com, AP-2,Walter Camp-2)
- Jonathan Stewart, Oregon (Pro Football Weekly)
- Ray Rice, Rutgers (AP-2, Walter Camp-2)
- Garrett Wolfe, Northern Illinois (AP-3)

=== Fullbacks ===
- Brian Leonard, Rutgers (Pro Football Weekly, ESPN, Scout.com)

=== Wide receivers ===
- Calvin Johnson, Georgia Tech (CFHOF) (AP-1, AFCA, FWAA, TSN, WCFF, SI, PFW, CBS, CFN, Rivals.com, Scout.com)
- Dwayne Jarrett, Southern California (AP-1, WCFF, SI, Scout.com)
- Robert Meachem, Tennessee (FWAA, TSN, ESPN, CFN, Rivals.com, AP-3)
- Jeff Samardzija, Notre Dame (FWAA, AP-2, Walter Camp-2)
- Johnnie Lee Higgins, UTEP (AFCA, AP-3)
- Jarett Dillard, Rice (ESPN, AP-2, Walter Camp-2)
- Steve Smith, Southern California (CBS)

=== Tight ends ===
- Zach Miller, Arizona State (AFCA-Coaches, Walter Camp, AP-2)
- Matt Spaeth, Minnesota (AP-1, Rivals.com)
- Jonny Harline, BYU (Sporting News, Sports Illustrated, ESPN, CBS Sports, College Football News, Scout.com, AP-3)
- Travis Beckum, Wisconsin (Walter Camp-2)

=== Offensive linemen ===
- Sam Baker, Southern California (FWAA-Writers, Sporting News, CBS Sports, AP-2, Walter Camp-2)
- Joe Thomas, Wisconsin (CFHOF) (AP-1, AFCA-Coaches, FWAA-Writers, Walter Camp, Sporting News, Sports Illustrated, Pro Football Weekly, ESPN, CBS Sports, College Football News, Rivals.com, Scout.com)
- Jake Long, Michigan (AP-1, AFCA-Coaches, FWAA-Writers, Walter Camp, Sports Illustrated, Pro Football Weekly, ESPN, CBS Sports, Rivals.com, Scout.com)
- Justin Blalock, Texas (AP-1, AFCA-Coaches, FWAA-Writers, Walter Camp, Sporting News, Pro Football Weekly, ESPN, CBS Sports, College Football News, Rivals.com, Scout.com)
- Arron Sears, Tennessee (AFCA-Coaches, Walter Camp, College Football News, AP-2)
- Steve Vallos, Wake Forest (Sporting News, Sports Illustrated, College Football News, Walter Camp-2)
- Josh Beekman, Boston College (AP-1, Walter Camp-2)
- Ben Grubbs, Auburn (Pro Football Weekly, ESPN, Rivals.com, AP-2)
- Alex Boone, Ohio State (Sports Illustrated)
- Mike Jones, Iowa (Scout.com)
- T. J. Downing, Ohio State (AP-2)
- Levi Brown, Penn State (AP-3, Walter Camp-2)
- Tony Ugoh, Arkansas (AP-3)
- Kurt Quarterman, Louisville (AP-3)
- Nate Bennett, Clemson (AP-3)

=== Centers ===
- Dan Mozes, West Virginia (AP-1, AFCA-Coaches, FWAA-Writers, Walter Camp, Sporting News, Sports Illustrated, ESPN, CBS Sports, College Football News, Rivals.com, Scout.com)
- Ryan Kalil, Southern California (Pro Football Weekly, AP-2, Walter Camp-2)
- Jonathan Luigs, Arkansas (AP-3)

== Defense ==
=== Ends ===
- Gaines Adams, Clemson (AP-1, AFCA-Coaches, FWAA-Writers, Walter Camp, Sporting News, Sports Illustrated, Pro Football Weekly, ESPN, CBS Sports, College Football News, Rivals.com)
- Justin Hickman, UCLA (FWAA-Writers, Walter Camp, Sporting News, AP-2)
- LaMarr Woodley, Michigan (AP-1, AFCA-Coaches, FWAA-Writers, Walter Camp, Sporting News, ESPN, CBS Sports, Rivals.com, Scout.com)
- Bruce Davis, UCLA (Sports Illustrated, College Football News)
- Jarvis Moss, Florida (Pro Football Weekly)
- Anthony Spencer, Purdue (Scout.com, AP-3, Walter Camp-2)
- Mkristo Bruce, Washington State (AP-2, Walter Camp-2)
- Quentin Moses, Georgia (AP-3, Walter Camp-2)
- Tim Crowder, Texas (Walter Camp-2)

=== Tackles ===
- Quinn Pitcock, Ohio State (AP-1, AFCA-Coaches, Walter Camp, Sporting News, ESPN, CBS Sports, College Football News, Rivals.com, Scout.com)
- Glenn Dorsey, LSU (AP-1, AFCA-Coaches, Sports Illustrated, Pro Football Weekly, CBS Sports, Rivals.com)
- Eric Foster, Rutgers (FWAA-Writers, AP-3)
- Alan Branch, Michigan (Sports Illustrated, Pro Football Weekly, ESPN, Scout.com, AP-2)
- Sedrick Ellis, Southern California (College Football News)
- Amobi Okoye, Louisville (AP-2)
- Jay Alford, Penn State (AP-3)

=== Linebackers ===
- Patrick Willis, Mississippi (AP-1, FWAA-Writers, Walter Camp, Sporting News, Sports Illustrated, Pro Football Weekly, ESPN, CBS Sports, College Football News, Rivals.com, Scout.com)
- James Laurinaitis, Ohio State (AP-1, FWAA-Writers, Walter Camp, Sporting News, Sports Illustrated, ESPN, CBS Sports, Rivals.com, Scout.com)
- Paul Posluszny, Penn State (AP-1, Walter Camp, ESPN, Rivals.com, Scout.com)
- Rufus Alexander, Oklahoma (AFCA-Coaches, CBS Sports, AP-3, Walter Camp-2)
- Buster Davis, Florida State (AFCA-Coaches, Walter Camp-2)
- H.B. Blades, Pittsburgh (FWAA-Writers, Sports Illustrated, AP-3, Walter Camp-2)
- Dan Connor, Penn State (Sporting News, Pro Football Weekly, AP-2)
- Vince Hall, Virginia Tech (College Football News)
- Ameer Ismail, Western Michigan (College Football News, AP-2)
- Jon Beason, Miami-FL (Pro Football Weekly)
- David Harris, Michigan (AP-2)
- Brandon Siler, Florida (AP-3)

=== Defensive backs ===
- Leon Hall, Michigan (AP-1, AFCA-Coaches, FWAA-Writers, Walter Camp, Pro Football Weekly, CBS Sports, College Football News, Rivals.com, Scout.com)
- Dante Hughes, California (AP-1, AFCA-Coaches, Walter Camp, Sporting News, Sports Illustrated, ESPN, CBS Sports, Rivals.com, Scout.com)
- Reggie Nelson, Florida (AP-1, FWAA-Writers, Walter Camp, Sporting News, Sports Illustrated, ESPN, CBS Sports, College Football News, Rivals.com, Scout.com)
- Eric Weddle, Utah (AFCA-Coaches, Sporting News, Sports Illustrated, CBS Sports, College Football News, Rivals.com, AP-2, Walter Camp-2)
- LaRon Landry, LSU (AP-1, AFCA-Coaches, Pro Football Weekly, ESPN, Walter Camp-2)
- Aaron Ross, Texas (FWAA-Writers, Walter Camp, Sports Illustrated, Pro Football Weekly, ESPN, College Football News, AP-2)
- Dwight Lowery, San Jose State (AFCA-Coaches, FWAA-Writers, AP-3)
- Michael Griffin, Texas (Pro Football Weekly, Rivals.com, Scout.com, AP-2, Walter Camp-2)
- John Talley, Duke (Sporting News)
- Ryan Smith, Florida (AP-2)
- Brandon Flowers, Virginia Tech (AP-3)
- Tra Battle, Georgia (AP-3)
- Tom Zbikowski, Notre Dame (AP-3, Walter Camp-2)

== Special teams ==
=== Kickers ===
- Justin Medlock, UCLA (AP-1, AFCA-Coaches, FWAA-Writers, Sporting News, CBS Sports, College Football News, Scout.com, Walter Camp-2)
- Mason Crosby, Colorado (Walter Camp, Pro Football Weekly, AP-3)
- Sam Swank, Wake Forest (Sports Illustrated, ESPN, Rivals.com)
- Art Carmody, Louisville (AP-2)

=== Punters ===
- Daniel Sepulveda, Baylor (AP-1, AFCA-Coaches, FWAA-Writers, Walter Camp, Sporting News, Sports Illustrated, Pro Football Weekly, ESPN, CBS Sports, College Football News, Rivals.com, Scout.com)
- Durant Brooks, Georgia Tech (AP-2, Walter Camp-2)
- Jeremy Kapinos, Penn State (AP-3)

=== All-purpose / return specialists ===
- DeSean Jackson, California (AP-1 [All-purpose player], FWAA-Writers, Sporting News, Walter Camp-KR, Sports Illustrated, Pro Football Weekly-WR and PR, ESPN, CBS Sports, College Football News, Rivals.com, Scout.com)
- Marcus Thigpen, Indiana (Sporting News, Sports Illustrated, Pro Football Weekly, ESPN, College Football News, Rivals.com)
- Ted Ginn Jr., Ohio State (Rivals.com- All-purpose player, AP-2, Walter Camp-2)
- Sammie Stroughter, Oregon State (AP-3)

== See also ==
- 2006 All-Atlantic Coast Conference football team
- 2006 All-Big Ten Conference football team
- 2006 All-Big 12 Conference football team
- 2006 All-Pacific-10 Conference football team
- 2006 All-SEC football team
