= Jonathan Stewart =

American football player (born 1987)

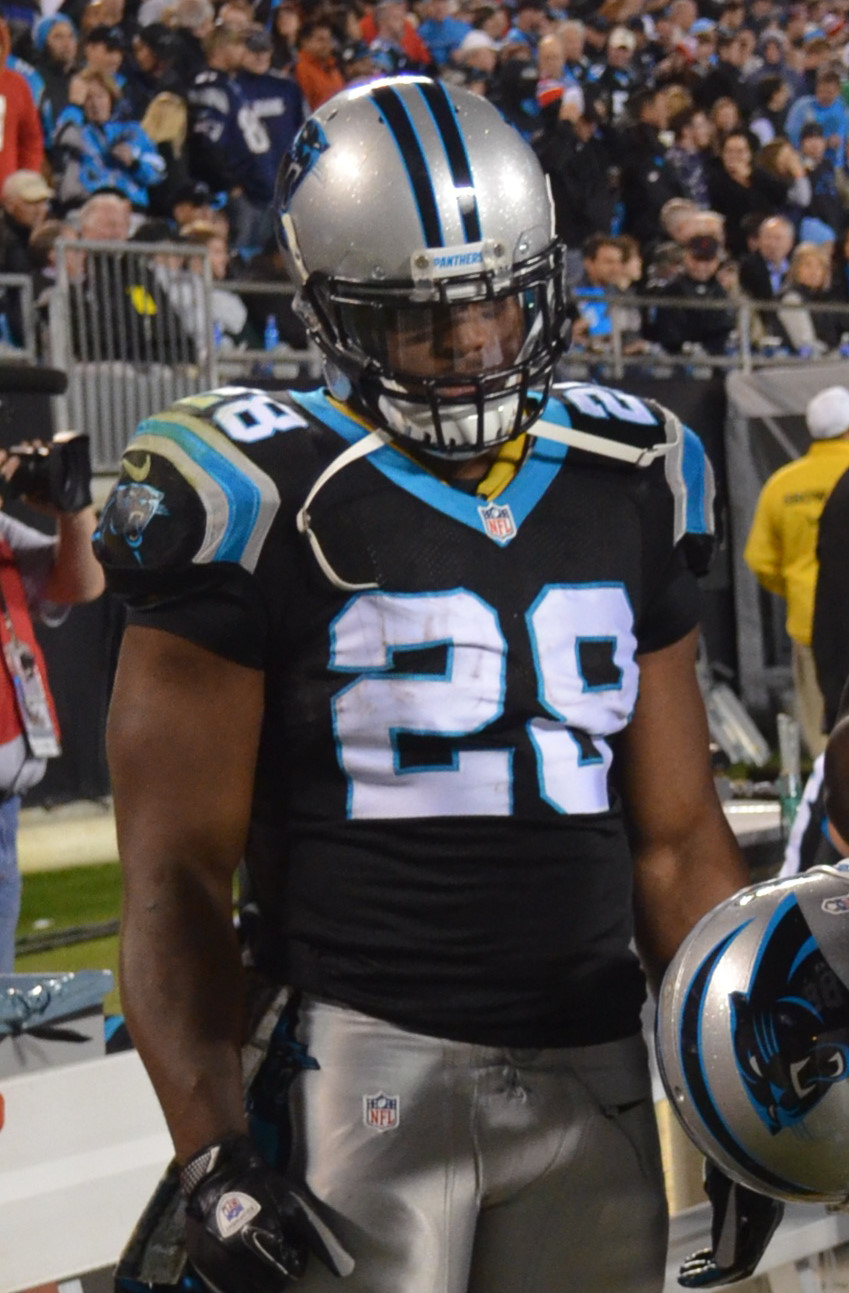
- Stewart with the Carolina Panthers in 2013

No. 28
- Position: Running back

Personal information
- Born: March 21, 1987 (age 39); Fort Lewis, Washington, U.S.
- Listed height: 5 ft 10 in (1.78 m)
- Listed weight: 245 lb (111 kg)

Career information
- High school: Timberline (Lacey, Washington)
- College: Oregon (2005–2007)
- NFL draft: 2008: 1st round, 13th overall pick

Career history
- Carolina Panthers (2008–2017); New York Giants (2018)

Awards and highlights
- Pro Bowl (2015); 2× First-team All-American (2006, 2007); NCAA average kickoff return yards leader (2005); First-team All-Pac-10 (2007); Second-team All-Pac-10 (2006)

Career NFL statistics
- Rushing yards: 7,335
- Rushing average: 4.3
- Rushing touchdowns: 51
- Receptions: 162
- Receiving yards: 1,295
- Receiving touchdowns: 7
- Stats at Pro Football Reference

Jonathan Creon Stewart (born March 21, 1987) is an American former professional football player who was a running back in the National Football League (NFL). He played college football for the Oregon Ducks, earning All-American honors. Stewart was selected by the Carolina Panthers in the first round of the 2008 NFL draft with the 13th overall pick. He played 10 seasons with Carolina, making the 2016 Pro Bowl, before spending one season with the New York Giants. Following the 2018 season, Stewart signed a one-day contract with Carolina and retired as a Panther.

== Early life ==
Stewart is the career leading rusher in Washington prep football history. At Timberline High School in Lacey, Washington, from 2001 to 2004, he rushed for 7,755 yards and scored 105 touchdowns. In 2001, as a freshman, he rushed for 1,279 yards on 95 carries (13.5 avg.) and scored 15 touchdowns. In 2002, as a sophomore, despite an ankle injury causing him to miss almost half of the season, he rushed for 1,609 yards on 153 carries (10.5 avg.) and scored 14 touchdowns. As a junior, in 2003, he rushed for 2,566 yards on 285 carries (9.0 avg.) and scored 45 touchdowns. As a senior, in 2004, he rushed for 2,301 yards, averaging 11.2 yards per carry and scored 32 touchdowns. Against Centralia High School in 2002, Stewart rushed for 422 yards and scored nine touchdowns.

After his senior season in 2004, among several other honors, Stewart was named to the Parade High School All-American team, the USA Today All-USA team, and was the Washington Gatorade Player of the Year.

=== Track and field ===
In addition to football, Stewart was on the school's track & field team, where he competed mainly as a sprinter. He placed third in the 100 meters at the prelims of the 2003 3A District IV Championships, with a season-best time of 10.90 seconds. He ran a career-best time of 10.78 seconds in the 100 meters in 2005, that still stands as the school's fastest time ever.

As a University of Oregon collegiate, Stewart competed in the 60-meter dash, recording a personal-best time of 6.88 seconds at the 2007 MPSF Championships, where he placed fifth.

=== Recruiting ===
In a national recruiting battle, Stewart chose the University of Oregon over USC, Notre Dame, Nebraska, California, Ohio State, and other schools.

== College career ==
=== 2005 season ===
Stewart's true freshman season was highlighted by a pair of kickoff return touchdowns against Montana and Oregon State, which made him the program's first player to ever return more than one kickoff for a score. Stewart ended up leading the nation in kickoff return average (33.7 yards-per-return).

Stewart finished his freshman campaign with nine total touchdowns (six rushing, one receiving, and two kickoff returns) despite touching the football only 72 times. His 54 points made him the team's third leading scorer. An ankle injury would force him to miss action in two games and render him less than 100% in others. At one point early in the season, Stewart had accounted for five touchdowns in his first 20 touches of the football.

=== 2006 season ===
Stewart finished his sophomore season as the team's leading rusher. He finished 19 yards shy of 1,000 yards rushing despite missing some time due to lingering ankle injuries. He recorded five 100 yard games in the season and the Ducks were 5–0 in those games. Stewart also caught 20 passes for 144 yards including a touchdown and he again finished near the top nationally in kickoff returning (sixth in the country). In Oregon's controversial win against the Oklahoma, Stewart impressed, rushing for 144 yards and a touchdown. In the final regular season game against rival Oregon State, Stewart rushed for 94 yards and three touchdowns. He finished his sophomore season with 10 rushing touchdowns and one receiving score.

=== 2007 season ===
Stewart and the Ducks opened the 2007 campaign 4–0, with wins over Houston, Michigan (in Ann Arbor), Fresno State, and Stanford. Against Michigan, Stewart ran for 111 yards and a touchdown on just 15 carries. He followed up that performance with 165 yards rushing and two touchdowns on just 17 carries against Fresno State. Stewart's second touchdown, an 88-yard rush, was the longest run ever in the 41-year history of Autzen Stadium. The following week against Stanford, Stewart picked up a career best 310 all-purpose yards, including 160 yards rushing and a ten-yard touchdown run. In Oregon's showdown against Cal, Stewart ran for 120 yards and a touchdown on 21 carries, in a 31–24 loss to the Golden Bears. Stewart chipped in 66 rushing yards in Oregon's 53–7 win over Washington State, then had a record setting day against rival Washington. Stewart had a career-high 32 carries for 251 yards and two touchdowns, the latter being the second highest single game total in Oregon's history. Stewart continued his impressive play with a 103-yard, 25 carry, two touchdown performance against USC in Oregon's 24–17 home win. Against then #4 ranked Arizona State, Stewart ran for 99 yards on 21 carries (including a 33-yard touchdown scamper), caught two passes for 26 yards and another score, and returned five kicks for 122 yards. Stewart concluded his record setting season with a career-high 39 carries against rival Oregon State, accumulating 163 yards along the way. In Oregon's 56–21 bowl win over South Florida, Stewart ran for a career-high 253 yards, setting a Sun Bowl record for rushing yards and earning him the C.M. Hendricks Most Valuable Player award. Overall, on the 2007 season, he finished with 1,722 rushing yards, 11 rushing touchdowns, 22 receptions, 145 receiving yards, and two receiving touchdowns.

At the end of the 2007 regular season, Stewart was selected to the All-Pacific-10 Conference first-team by league coaches. He also garnered All-America notice.

== Professional career ==
=== Pre-draft ===
Pre-draft measurables
Height	Weight	40-yard dash	10-yard split	20-yard split	Vertical jump	Broad jump	Bench press	Wonderlic
5 ft 10 1/4 in (1.78 m)	235 lb (107 kg)	4.48 s	1.54 s	2.56 s	36 1/2 in (0.93 m)	10 ft 8 in (3.25 m)	28 reps	20
All values from NFL Combine

On January 11, 2008, Stewart announced his decision to forgo his senior season at Oregon and to enter the Draft. On March 12, 2008, Stewart underwent surgery on his big toe and was expected to be out four to six months. Stewart, was ranked among the top three running backs entering the April NFL Draft, along with Darren McFadden and Rashard Mendenhall.

=== Carolina Panthers ===
==== 2008 season ====
Stewart was drafted by the Carolina Panthers, taken in the first round with the 13th overall selection of the 2008 NFL draft. On July 26, he signed a $14 million contract with a maximum value of $20 million. The deal included $10.795 million in guarantees.

Stewart would share carries with DeAngelo Williams, a first round pick from the 2006 NFL draft. In his first game against the San Diego Chargers, Stewart ran the ball 10 times for 53 yards. In his second game against the Chicago Bears, Stewart helped the Panthers recover from a first half deficit, scoring two second half touchdowns from four and one yard respectively. Stewart finished with 14 carries for 77 yards and the first two touchdowns of his young NFL career.

Stewart had two solid performances gaining over 100 rushing yards in Weeks 11 and 14. In the Week 11 game against the Detroit Lions, Stewart rushed for 130 yards on only 15 carries, adding a rushing touchdown. In Week 14 against division rival Tampa Bay Buccaneers, he ran for 115 yards on 15 carries with two rushing touchdowns. He finished the 2008 regular season with 10 rushing touchdowns, a Panthers rookie record. Stewart also added 836 rushing yards on 184 carries with a 4.5 rushing average in his rookie season. Stewart added his first postseason rushing touchdown in a 33–13 loss to the Arizona Cardinals in the Divisional Round on January 10.

==== 2009 season ====
Stewart and Williams combined for 262 yards in a victory versus their division foe, the Buccaneers. In Week 13, Stewart made his first career start for an injured Williams, and recorded 120 yards on 26 rushes and a touchdown in a 16–6 victory over Tampa Bay. In Week 16, Stewart, starting for the injured Williams, recorded a team record 206 rushing yards in a 41–9 win over the New York Giants in their final game at Giants Stadium, and earned FedEx Ground Player of the week honors. The performance lifted him over the 1,000 yard mark, making him and Williams only the sixth rushing duo in NFL history to rush for 1,000 yards in a single season. He later surpassed the 1,100 yard mark, making him and Williams the first rushing duo in NFL history to rush for 1,100 yards apiece. Stewart finished the season with 1,133 yards and 10 touchdowns on 221 carries, slightly outperforming Williams in both categories.

==== 2010 season ====
Stewart started the 2010 season once again splitting carries with Williams, but gained the opportunity to start when Williams was placed on injured reserve; for the rest of the season, Stewart split carries with Mike Goodson, although he was credited with the starts for the majority of these games. In Week 14, against the Atlanta Falcons, he finished with 133 rushing yards. In the next game against the Cardinals, he finished with 137 rushing yards. In a year where Carolina finished 2–14, Stewart managed to rack up 770 yards rushing and two touchdowns in 14 games played and seven started, the worst statistical performance of his career.

==== 2011 season ====
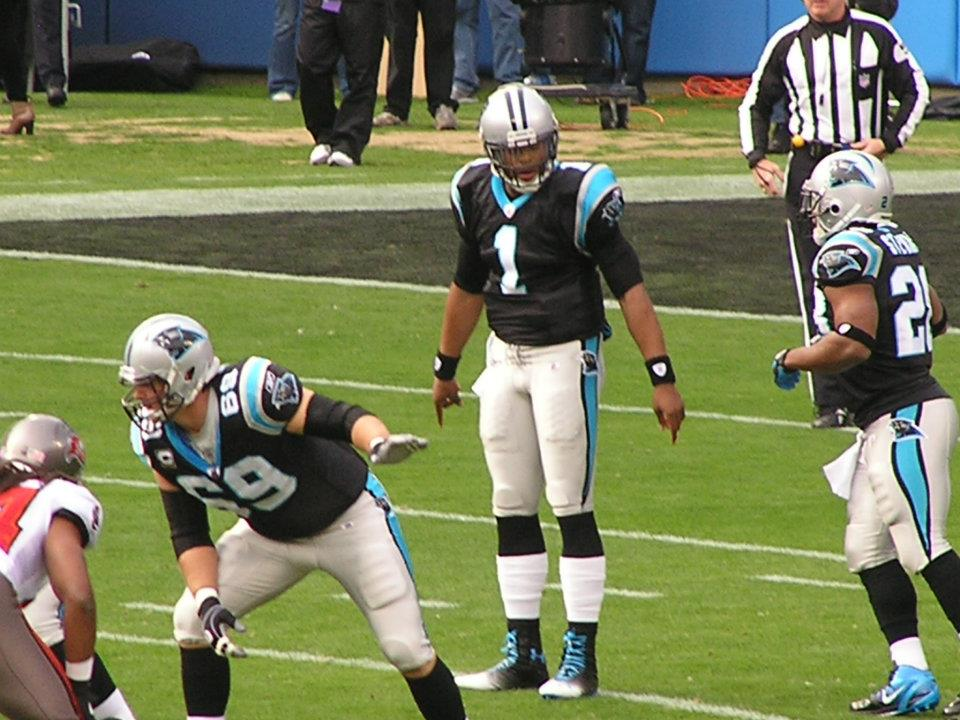
Stewart (far right) in 2011 against Tampa Bay

In 2011, Stewart again shared carries with Williams, rushing for 761 yards on 5.4 yards per touch. Behind rookie quarterback Cam Newton, Williams, and Stewart combined, the Panthers had the third-best rushing attack in the NFL in the 2011 season.

==== 2012 season ====
On August 10, 2012, Stewart signed a five-year, $37.811 million contract extension with $23 million guaranteed. After sustaining an ankle injury in the 2012 preseason, Stewart continued to struggle to stay healthy for several parts of the season, ending with only 336 yards on 3.6 yards per carry at the end of the year.

==== 2013 season ====
In 2013, Stewart once again was plagued by injuries, only playing in six regular season contests. He had 48 carries for 180 rushing yards on the season.

==== 2014 season ====
In Week 14, against the New Orleans Saints, he recorded 155 yards on 20 carries. He had a career long 69-yard touchdown run in that same game. In Week 16, against the Cleveland Browns, he had 24 carries for 122 yards in the 17–13 victory. He finished the regular season with 175 carries for 809 yards and three rushing touchdowns. Along with that, he had 25 receptions for 181 yards and one receiving touchdowns. In the Wild Card Round of the playoffs, Stewart had 24 carries for 123 rushing yards and one touchdown in a 27–16 victory over the Cardinals.

==== 2015 season: Super Bowl 50 appearance ====
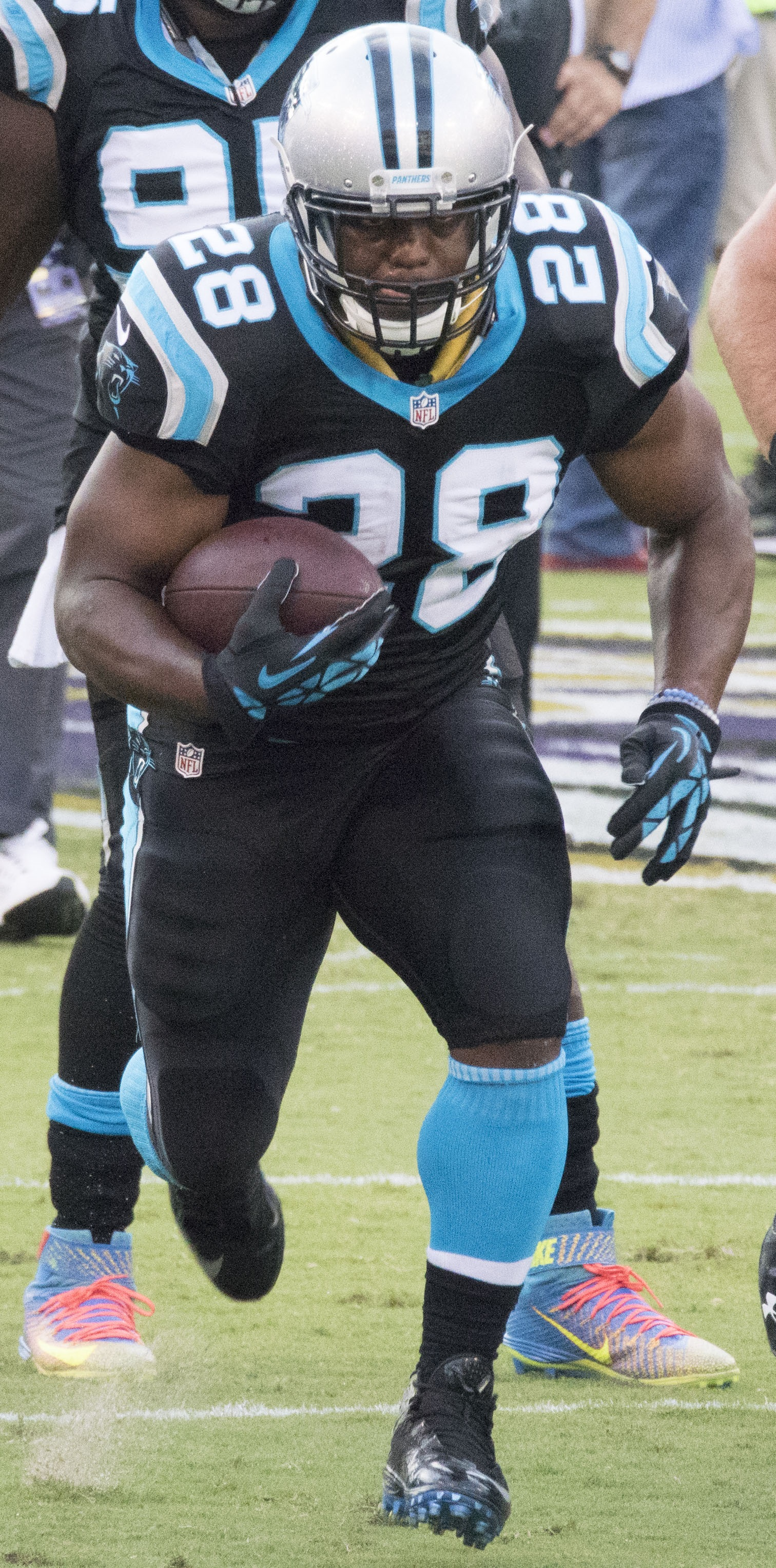
Stewart with the Panthers in 2016.

Stewart had an impressive game in a win against the Seattle Seahawks in Week 6. He carried the ball 20 times for 78 yards and two touchdowns. This marked the first time Stewart had two rushing touchdowns in one game since 2009. Stewart recorded 125 yards rushing with 5.2 yards per carry in a victory over the Philadelphia Eagles in Week 7. Stewart continued his high level of play during a Monday night win over the Indianapolis Colts, rushing for 82 yards along with a rushing touchdown. Stewart missed the final three games on the regular season with a foot injury. Even with the missed games, he finished with 989 rushing yards and six touchdowns along with 16 receptions with 99 yards and one receiving touchdown. Stewart finished eighth in the NFL in rushing.

In the Divisional Round, Stewart rushed for 106 yards and two touchdowns on 19 carries to key Carolina's 31–24 win over the Seahawks. In the NFC Championship against the Cardinals, he finished with 83 rushing yards in the 49–15 victory. In Super Bowl 50, Stewart rushed for 29 yards on 12 carries and scored the lone touchdown for the Panthers. The Panthers fell to the Denver Broncos by a score of 24–10. He was ranked 86th by his fellow players on the NFL Top 100 Players of 2016.

==== 2016 season ====
Stewart again began the 2016 season as the Panthers starting running back, but missed three games following a hamstring injury in Week 2. He returned with 85 yards and two touchdowns against the Saints and 95 yards and two touchdowns against the Cardinals in Weeks 6–7. In Week 12 against the Raiders, he again had two touchdowns, marking the first time since 2009 he had three two-touchdown games. He recorded a season-high 25 carries for 132 yards against the Washington Redskins in Week 15. He led the team with 218 rushes for 824 yards and nine rushing touchdowns.

==== 2017 season ====
On March 24, 2017, Stewart signed a one-year contract extension with the Panthers through the 2018 season. Carolina went on to draft Stanford's Christian McCaffrey with the #8 overall selection in the 2017 NFL draft to pair with him.

In Week 10, against the Miami Dolphins, he had 17 carries for 110 rushing yards. In Week 14 against the Minnesota Vikings, Stewart ran for 103 yards and three touchdowns, including a 60-yard run, earning him NFC Offensive Player of the Week. Overall, in the 2017 season, he finished with 680 rushing yards and six rushing touchdowns.

On February 28, 2018, Stewart was released by the Panthers after 10 seasons with the team, leaving as the franchise's all-time leading rusher.

=== New York Giants ===
On March 13, 2018, Stewart signed a two-year $6.9 million contract with the Giants. On September 28, 2018, the Giants placed Stewart on injured reserve with a foot injury. In three games, he had six carries for 17 yards.

On February 6, 2019, the Giants declined the option on Stewart's contract, making him a free agent at the start of the league year.

=== Retirement ===
On April 23, 2019, Stewart signed a one-day contract to retire as a member of the Panthers.

== Career statistics ==
Legend
**Bold**	Career high

=== NFL ===
==== Regular season ====
Year	Team	Games		Rushing					Receiving					Kickoff returns					Fumbles	
Year	Team	GP	GS	Att	Yds	Avg	Lng	TD	Rec	Yds	Avg	Lng	TD	Ret	Yds	Avg	Lng	TD	Fum	Lost
2008	CAR	16	0	184	836	4.5	41	**10**	8	47	5.9	15	0	**15**	**349**	**23.3**	**38**	0	2	1
2009	CAR	16	3	221	**1,133**	5.1	67	**10**	18	139	7.7	19	1	2	17	8.5	17	0	3	2
2010	CAR	14	7	178	770	4.3	48	2	8	103	**12.9**	**55**	1	—	—	—	—	—	**4**	**4**
2011	CAR	16	3	142	761	**5.4**	32	4	**47**	**413**	8.8	26	1	—	—	—	—	—	1	0
2012	CAR	9	6	93	332	3.6	21	1	17	157	9.2	30	1	—	—	—	—	—	2	0
2013	CAR	6	1	48	180	3.8	16	0	7	44	6.3	16	0	—	—	—	—	—	1	0
2014	CAR	13	8	175	809	4.6	**69**	3	25	181	7.2	22	1	—	—	—	—	—	2	1
2015	CAR	13	13	**242**	989	4.1	44	6	16	99	6.2	15	1	—	—	—	—	—	3	2
2016	CAR	13	13	218	824	3.8	47	9	8	60	7.5	25	0	—	—	—	—	—	3	2
2017	CAR	15	10	198	680	3.4	60	6	8	52	6.5	21	1	—	—	—	—	—	3	3
2018	NYG	3	0	6	17	2.8	5	0	—	—	—	—	—	—	—	—	—	—	0	0
Total		134	64	1,705	7,335	4.3	69	51	162	1,295	8.0	55	7	17	366	21.5	38	0	24	15

==== Postseason ====
Year	Team	Games		Rushing					Receiving					Fumbles	
Year	Team	GP	GS	Att	Yds	Avg	Lng	TD	Rec	Yds	Avg	Lng	TD	Fum	Lost
2008	CAR	1	0	3	12	4.0	9	1	3	**39**	**13.0**	**18**	0	0	0
2013	CAR	0	0	Did not play due to injury											
2014	CAR	2	2	37	193	**5.2**	35	1	2	1	0.5	4	0	**1**	**1**
2015	CAR	3	3	**50**	**218**	4.4	**59**	**3**	**4**	9	2.3	5	0	0	0
2017	CAR	1	1	11	51	4.6	29	0	0	0	0.0	0	0	0	0
Total		7	6	101	474	4.7	59	5	9	49	5.4	18	0	1	1

=== College ===
Legend
Led the NCAA

Season	Team	GP	Rushing						Receiving				Kick returns				
Season	Team	GP	Att	Yds	Avg	100+	Lng	TD	Rec	Yds	Avg	TD	Ret	Yds	Avg	Lng	TD
2005	Oregon	10	53	188	3.5	0	33	6	7	45	6.4	1	12	404	**33.7**	97	**2**
2006	Oregon	13	183	981	5.4	5	63	10	20	144	**7.2**	1	**23**	**646**	28.1	68	0
2007	Oregon	13	**280**	**1,722**	**6.2**	**9**	**88**	**11**	**22**	**145**	6.6	**2**	**23**	614	26.7	64	0
Career		36	516	2,891	5.6	14	88	27	49	334	6.8	4	58	1,664	28.7	97	2

== Career highlights ==
=== Awards and honors ===
NFL

- Pro Bowl (2015)
- Ranked No. 86 in the Top 100 Players of 2016

College

- 2× First-team All-American (2006, 2007)
- NCAA average kickoff return yards leader (2005)
- NCAA kickoff return touchdowns leader: 2 TDs (2005)
- First-team All-Pac-10 (2007)
- Second-team All-Pac-10 (2006)
- Pac-10 All-Freshman Team (2005)
- Sun Bowl Champions (2007)
- Sun Bowl MVP (2007)
- Doak Walker Award semifinalist (2007)
- Pac-10 rushing yards leader: 1,722 yds (2007)

=== Panthers franchise records ===
As of 2017, Stewart holds the following franchise records for the Panthers:

- Rush attempts: career (1,501), playoffs (90), rookie season (184)
- Rush yards: career (7,318), playoffs (423), rookie season (836)
- Yards per carry: playoff season (5.22 in 2014), rookie game (8.67 vs. the Lions on November 16, 2008)
- Rushing touchdowns: playoffs (5), playoff season (3 in 2015), playoff game (2 vs. the Seahawks on January 17, 2016)
- Total touchdowns, playoff game (2; tied with three others)
- All-purpose yards, rookie season (1,232)
- 100+ rushing yard games, playoffs (2)

== Personal life ==
On March 9, 2017, Stewart's wife, Natalie Hills, gave birth to their first child, a baby girl named Kaia Grey.

== Music career ==
Stewart is an aspiring music producer, "I don't want to hear my music being played and someone degrading women. I'm limited to that factor, but there's a lot to be talked about. If anybody wants to use my beats, I want to maintain my integrity that I have as a person." Jonathan Stewart also spoke with Dubcnn about his music career, stating "Music isn't a business for me. I'm not trying to supplement my lifestyle with music. I love music and I play music everyday, whether it's my piano, or making a song. It's the same with football, I get paid well to play football, because I'm blessed to have a lot of skill, but I could never be this good without loving the game... I love to play football as much as I did when I was a kid and played for nothing but love. Music is the same way. God blessed me with gifts for both and I love both, but I don't do music to make money at all. I love music, so why not let people make love to it."
