= Justin Medlock =

American football player (born 1983)

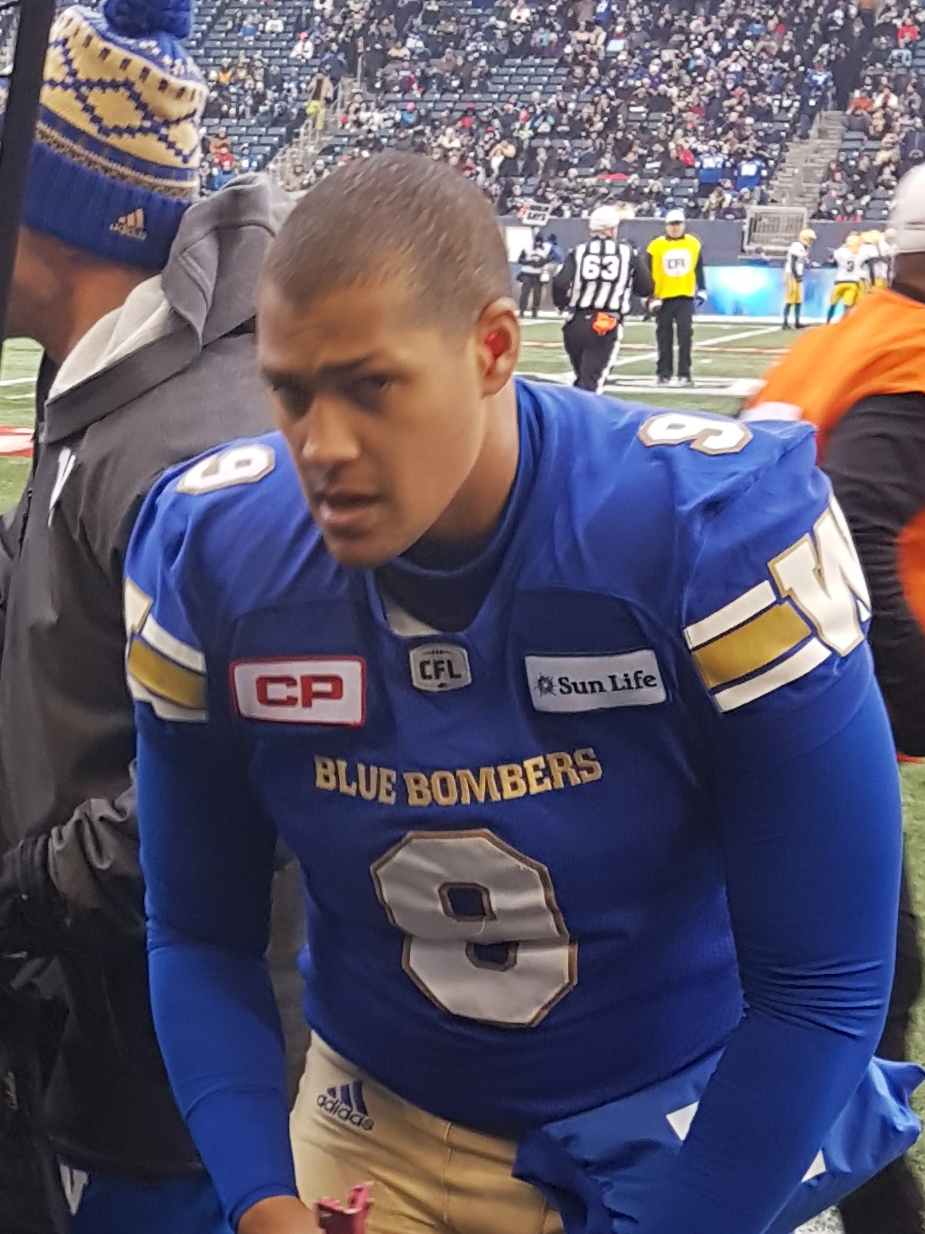
- Medlock with the Winnipeg Blue Bombers in 2017

No. 6, 7, 9
- Position: Kicker

Personal information
- Born: October 23, 1983 (age 43); Fremont, California, U.S.
- Listed height: 5 ft 11 in (1.80 m)
- Listed weight: 200 lb (91 kg)

Career information
- High school: Mission San Jose (Fremont)
- College: UCLA (2002–2006)
- NFL draft: 2007: 5th round, 160th overall pick

Career history
- Kansas City Chiefs (2007); St. Louis Rams (2008)*; Toronto Argonauts (2009); Washington Redskins (2010)*; Detroit Lions (2010)*; Omaha Nighthawks (2010); Toronto Argonauts (2010); Edmonton Eskimos (2010); Hamilton Tiger-Cats (2011); Carolina Panthers (2012); Oakland Raiders (2013)*; Hamilton Tiger-Cats (2014–2015); Winnipeg Blue Bombers (2016–2019)
- * Offseason or practice squad member only

Awards and highlights
- Grey Cup champion (2019); John Agro Special Teams Award (2016); 2× Dave Dryburgh Memorial Trophy (2016, 2017); CFL All Star (2016); 2× CFL East All Star (2011, 2015); CFL West All Star (2016); Consensus All-American (2006); 2× First-team All-Pac-10 (2004, 2006); Second-team All-Pac-10 (2005)

Career NFL statistics
- Field goals made: 8
- Field goal attempts: 12
- Field goal %: 66.7
- Long field goal: 45
- Stats at Pro Football Reference

Career CFL statistics
- Field goals made: 283
- Field goal attempts: 329
- Field goal %: 86.0
- Long field goal: 58
- Stats at CFL.ca

Justin Charles Medlock (born October 23, 1983) is an American former professional football player who was a placekicker in the National Football League (NFL) and Canadian Football League (CFL). He played college football for the UCLA Bruins, earning consensus All-American honors in 2006. The Kansas City Chiefs selected him in the fifth round of the 2007 NFL draft. Medlock also played in the NFL for the Carolina Panthers, as well as the Toronto Argonauts, Edmonton Eskimos, Hamilton Tiger-Cats, and Winnipeg Blue Bombers of the CFL.

== Early life ==
Medlock was born in Fremont, California. He attended Mission San Jose High School In Fremont, and played for the Mission San Jose Warriors high school football team as both a punter and placekicker. Medlock was ranked ninth in the country and was all-county and all-league at both positions. He averaged 43.1 yards per punt as a punter and made 11 out of 19 field goals in his junior and senior years.

== College career ==
Medlock attended University of California, Los Angeles, where he played for the UCLA Bruins football team from 2003 to 2006. He set a UCLA career record with six field goals of fifty yards or more, and was a four-year letterman. Overall, he completed 70 field goals on 80 attempts, and 147 of 148 extra point attempts. As a senior in 2006, he was recognized as a consensus first-team All-American.

== Professional career ==
=== Kansas City Chiefs ===
Medlock was drafted in the fifth round of the 2007 NFL draft by the Kansas City Chiefs with the 160th overall pick. Medlock was thought to go into the preseason competing with Lawrence Tynes for the kicking job, but the Chiefs traded Tynes to the New York Giants, thus making Medlock the de facto starter. Medlock was inconsistent in the preseason, making 3 of 6 kicks; the Chiefs released Medlock on September 10, 2007, after he converted a 27-yard field goal and missed on a 30-yard attempt in Week 1 against the Houston Texans, and signed Dave Rayner as a replacement.

=== St. Louis Rams ===
On February 11, 2008, Medlock signed with the St. Louis Rams. The Rams allowed Medlock to seek a trade after the signing of Josh Brown. He was later released on August 26, 2008.

=== Toronto Argonauts (first stint) ===
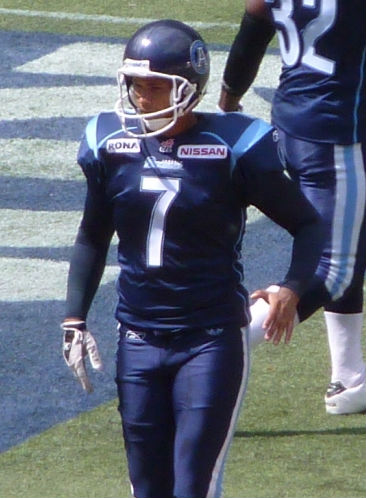
Medlock with the Argonauts in 2009

Medlock signed with the Toronto Argonauts on April 16, 2009 and competed with fellow new import kicker Eddie Johnson for the kicking spot vacated by the retirement of Mike Vanderjagt. At the end of training camp, the Argos elected to keep both kickers and coach Bart Andrus elected to start Johnson for game one and placed Medlock on the practice roster. Johnson, however, was injured on the opening kickoff when he separated his shoulder when tackling the return man and Medlock was slated to kick for game two of the 2009 Toronto Argonauts season.

On August 14, 2009, Medlock scored seven field goals, tying Lance Chomyc's Argonauts single-game team record and just short of the league record of eight shared by Dave Ridgway, Mark McLoughlin, and Paul Osbaldiston.

=== Washington Redskins ===
On February 12, 2010, the Washington Redskins signed Medlock to a future contract. He was waived on June 14, 2010.

=== Detroit Lions ===
On June 15, 2010, the Detroit Lions claimed him off waivers. He was waived on June 29, 2010.

=== Omaha Nighthawks ===
Medlock was signed by the Omaha Nighthawks of the United Football League on September 8, 2010.

=== Toronto Argonauts (second stint) ===
With struggles by incumbent placekicker Grant Shaw, the Argonauts elected to re-sign Medlock through the 2011 CFL season. On October 12, 2010, Medlock was released by the Argonauts after the team traded for kicker Noel Prefontaine.

=== Edmonton Eskimos ===
On October 14, 2010, Medlock was signed by the Edmonton Eskimos.

=== Hamilton Tiger-Cats (first stint) ===
On March 21, 2011, Medlock was traded by the Eskimos to the Hamilton Tiger-Cats. He enjoyed a strong 2011 season with Hamilton, making 49 of 55 field goals while also handling punting and kickoff duties. He became a free agent on February 15, 2012.

=== Carolina Panthers ===
Medlock signed a 3-year contract with the Carolina Panthers on March 7, 2012. On November 20, 2012, after missing field goals in 3 straight games, Medlock was waived by the Carolina Panthers.

=== Oakland Raiders ===
On August 27, 2013, he was signed by the Oakland Raiders. On August 31, 2013, he was waived by the Raiders.

=== Hamilton Tiger-Cats (second stint) ===
On January 8, 2014, Medlock signed with the Tiger-Cats of the Canadian Football League.

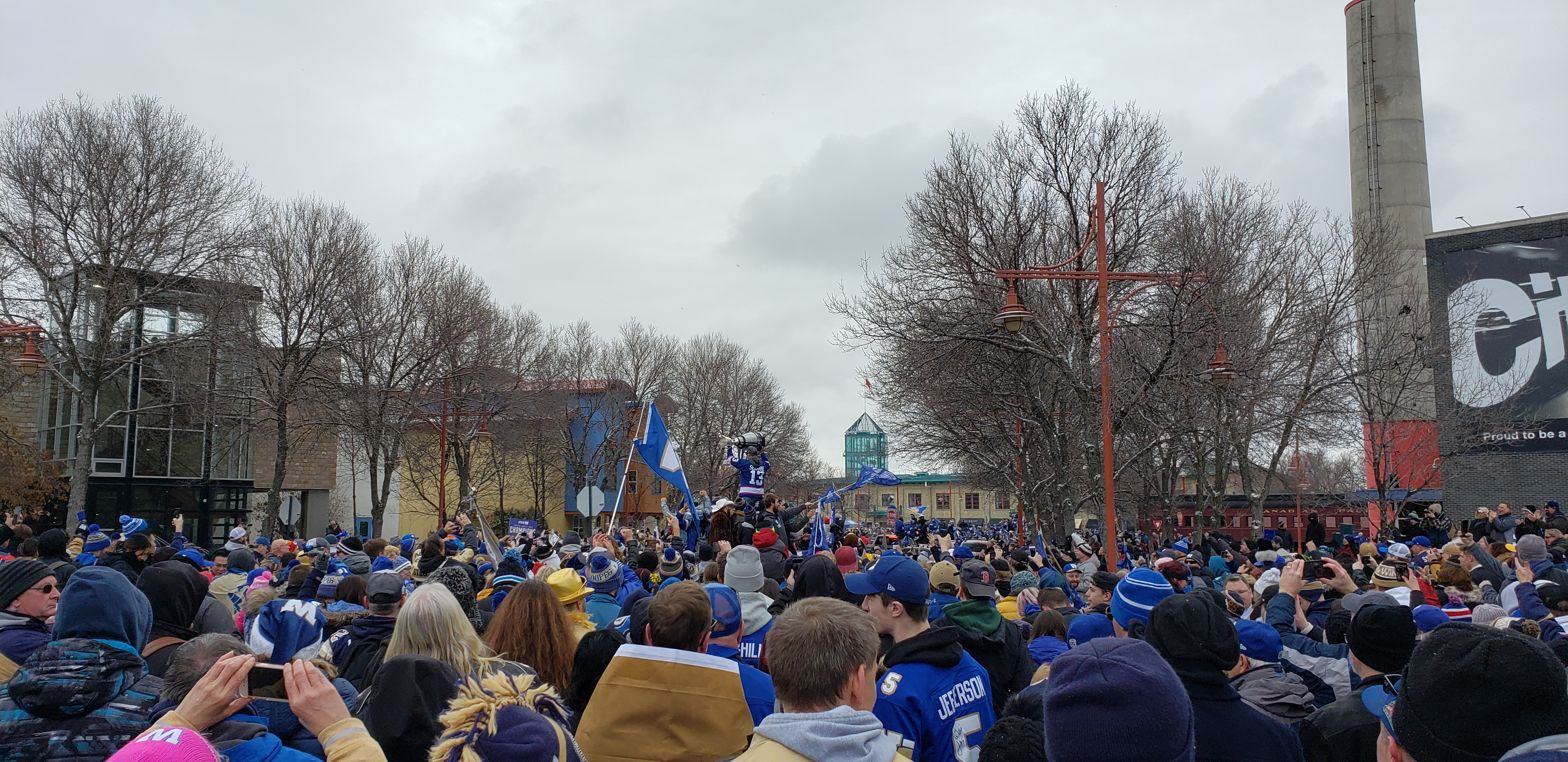
Medlock raises the Grey Cup during the Winnipeg Blue Bombers 2019 championship parade while wearing a Teemu Selanne jersey.

=== Winnipeg Blue Bombers ===
Medlock signed with the Winnipeg Blue Bombers on February 9, 2016. Medlock set career highs in made field goals (60), attempts (68) and longest field-goal (58 yards) during the 2016 season. Following the season he was named the West Division nominee for Special Teams Player of the Year. He was named a CFL All-Star for the first time in his career, and was named CFL's Most Outstanding Special Teams Player for the 2016 season. Following the season he was re-signed by the Bombers, preventing him from becoming a free-agent in February 2017. Medlock continued his strong play for the following two seasons, punting the ball 200 times (average of 44.1 yards per kick) while converting 98 of 117 field goal attempts (83.8%). On January 7, 2019, Medlock and the Bombers agreed to another two-year extension. Medlock's reliable foot helped lead the Blue Bombers to the 107th Grey Cup in 2019. There he kicked six field goals, tying a CFL record, as the Blue Bombers won the Grey Cup. He did not play in 2020 due to the cancellation of the 2020 CFL season and he became a free agent on February 9, 2021.

== Personal life ==
Medlock is married to LPGA golfer Hannah Jun Medlock.
