= Antwan Applewhite =

American football player (born 1985)

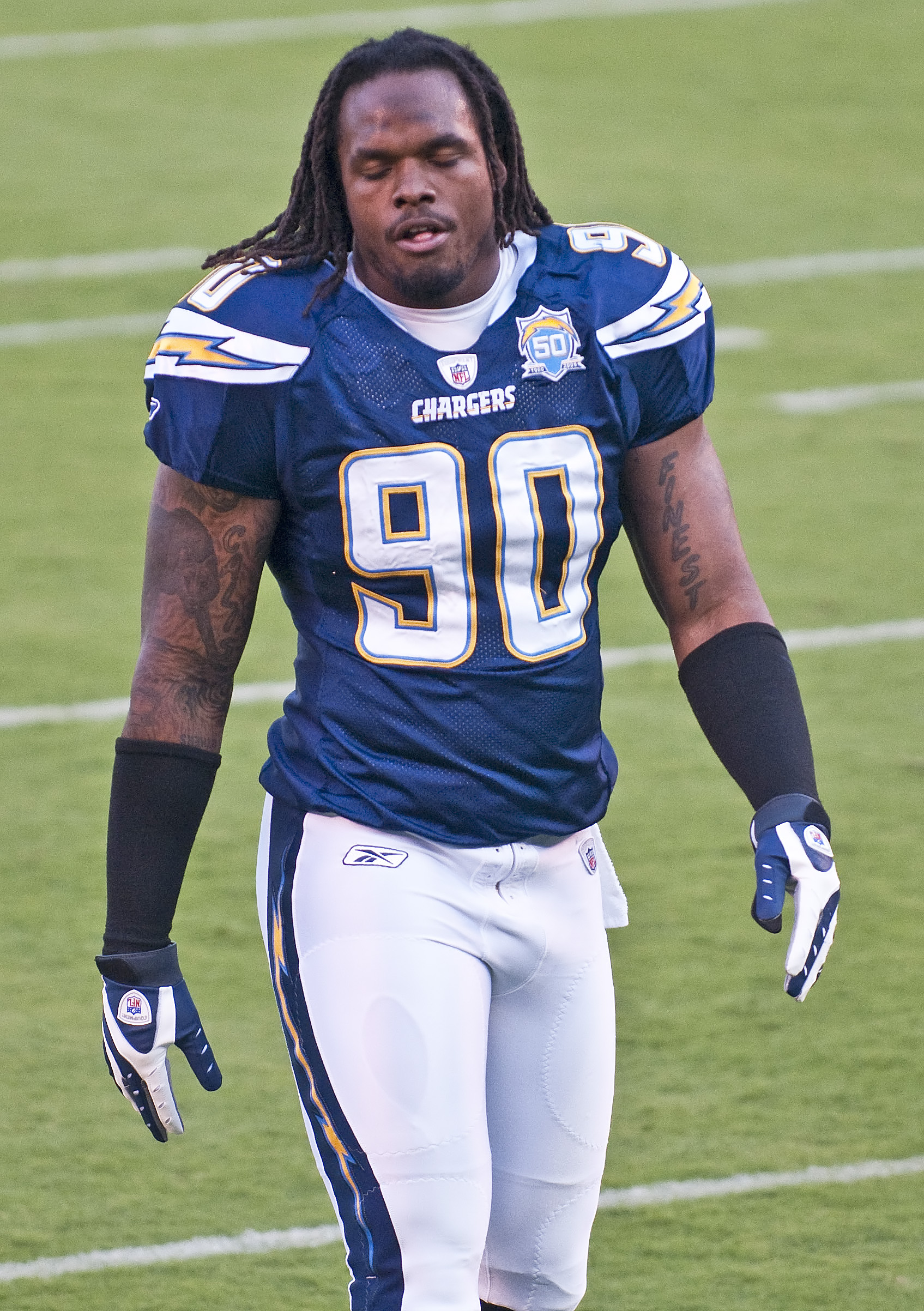
- Applewhite in November 2008

No. 90, 93
- Position: Defensive end

Personal information
- Born: December 31, 1985 (age 40); Los Angeles, California, U.S.
- Listed height: 6 ft 3 in (1.91 m)
- Listed weight: 270 lb (122 kg)

Career information
- High school: Narbonne (Harbor City, California)
- College: San Diego State
- NFL draft: 2007: undrafted

Career history
- San Diego Chargers (2007−2010); San Francisco 49ers (2011)*; Carolina Panthers (2011−2012); Miami Dolphins (2013)*
- * Offseason or practice squad member only

Awards and highlights
- First-team All-MW (2006)

Career NFL statistics
- Total tackles: 99
- Sacks: 6.5
- Forced fumbles: 4
- Pass deflections: 3
- Stats at Pro Football Reference

Antwan Deandre Applewhite (born December 31, 1985) is an American former professional football player who was a defensive end in the National Football League (NFL). He played college football at San Diego State and was signed by the San Diego Chargers as an undrafted free agent in 2007.

He was also a member of the San Francisco 49ers, Carolina Panthers, and Miami Dolphins.

== Early life ==
He was an All-area defensive player at Narbonne High School.

== Professional career ==
Pre-draft measurables
Height	Weight	Arm length	Hand span	40-yard dash	10-yard split	20-yard split	20-yard shuttle	Three-cone drill	Vertical jump	Broad jump	Bench press
6 ft 2 7/8 in (1.90 m)	250 lb (113 kg)	34 1/2 in (0.88 m)	10 in (0.25 m)	4.83 s	1.71 s	2.83 s	4.36 s	7.50 s	35.0 in (0.89 m)	9 ft 7 in (2.92 m)	25 reps
All values from NFL Combine

=== San Diego Chargers ===
Applewhite was signed as an undrafted free agent on April 30, 2007 by the National Football League's San Diego Chargers. He was released on September 1, 2007. He was re-signed to the practice squad on November 21.

Applewhite was waived during final cuts in 2008 but was re-signed to the team's practice squad. One game into the season on September 9, he was signed to the active roster after linebacker Shawne Merriman was placed on injured reserve.

=== San Francisco 49ers ===
On July 31, 2011, Applewhite signed with the San Francisco 49ers. He was released on September 6.

=== Carolina Panthers ===
The Carolina Panthers signed him on October 5, 2011. They converted him from Defensive End to rush Linebacker in mainly 3-4 sets. They then dropped him only to sign him the next day.

=== Miami Dolphins ===
On August 15, 2013, Applewhite was signed by the Miami Dolphins. Miami released him on August 31, prior to the start of the regular season.
