= Trent (name) =

Trent is a surname and a male given name, and means "the flooder". It is generally associated with the River Trent, a river in Britain. It may also be a short form of the given name Trenton.

== People ==
=== Given name ===
- Trent Alexander-Arnold (born 1998), English footballer sometimes known mononymously as Trent
- Trenton Trent Ashby (born 1972, American politician
- Trent Barrett (born 1977), Australian rugby league coach and former player
- Trent Blank (born 1989), American baseball coach
- Trent Boult (born 1989), New Zealand international cricketer
- Trent Cole (born 1982), American retired National Football League player
- Trent Copeland (born 1986), Australian cricketer and commentator
- Trent Correy (born 1985), Canadian film director, screenwriter and animator
- Trent Croad (born 1980), retired Australian rules footballer
- Trent Cotchin (born 1990), Australian rules footballer
- Trent D'Antonio (born 1985), Australian baseball player
- Trent Dawson (born 1971), American actor
- Trent Dilfer (born 1972), American retired National Football League quarterback and analyst
- Trent Dimas (born 1970), American retired gymnast and Olympic champion
- Trent Edwards (born 1983), American retired National Football League quarterback
- Trent Ford (born 1979), American-born English actor and model
- Trent Franks (born 1957), American politician and businessman
- Trent Frederic (born 1998), American National Hockey League player
- Trent Gamble (born 1977), American retired National Football League player
- Trent Gardner (1961–2016), American rock musician and producer
- Trent Green (born 1970), American retired National Football League quarterback
- Trent Grisham (born 1996), American Major League Baseball player
- Trenton (Trent) Guy (born 1987), American football player
- Trenton (Trent) Harmon (born 1990), American musician, winner of the fifteenth and final season of American Idol
- Trent Harris (director) (born 1952), American independent filmmaker
- Trent Harris (American football) (born 1995), American football player
- Trent Hodkinson (born 1988), Australian retired rugby league footballer
- Trent Hunter (born 1980), Canadian retired National Hockey League player
- Trent Johnson (born 1956), American college basketball coach
- Trent Klasna (born 1969), American former road bicycle racer
- Trent Kowalik (born 1995), American actor, dancer and singer
- Trent Kynaston (born 1946), American jazz and classical saxophonist
- Trent Lott (born 1941), U.S. Senator from Mississippi
- Trent Lowe (born 1984), Australian cyclist
- Trent McCleary (born 1972), Canadian retired National Hockey League player
- Trent Murphy (born 1990), American National Football League player
- Trent Oeltjen (born 1983), Australian former Major League Baseball player
- Trent Perry (born 2005), American basketball player
- Trent Plaisted (born 1986), American retired basketball player
- Trent Preszler (born 1977), American businessman and CEO of Bedell Cellars
- Trent Reznor (born 1965), American musician and frontman of Nine Inch Nails
- Trenton (Trent) Richardson (born 1990), American football running back
- Trent Robinson (born 1977), Australian rugby league coach and former player
- Trent Sainsbury, Australian football player
- Trenton (Trent) Scott (born 1994), American National Football League player
- Trent Sherfield (born 1996), American National Football League player
- Trent Sieg (born 1995), American National Football League player
- Trent Smith (born 1979), American football player
- Trent Taylor (born 1994), American National Football League player
- Trent Thornton (born 1993), American baseball player
- Trent Tomlinson (born 1975), American country singer-songwriter
- Trent Tucker (born 1959), American retired National Basketball Association player
- Trent Whitfield (born 1977), Canadian ice hockey coach and former player
- Trent Williams (born 1988), American National Football League player
- Trent Willmon (born 1973), American country artist and songwriter
- Trent Yawney, Canadian hockey coach and former player

=== Surname ===
- Derek Trent (born 1980), American former figure skater
- Djuan Trent (born 1986), American model
- Gary Trent (born 1974), American retired National Basketball Association player
- Gary Trent Jr. (born 1999), son of the above; American current NBA player
- Holden Trent (1999–2024), American soccer player
- Horace M. Trent (1907–1964), American physicist
- Jackie Trent (1940–2015), English singer-songwriter
- John Trent (actor) (1906–1966), American aviator and actor
- John Trent (author), American author of marriage and family books
- John Trent (director) (1935–1983), British-born Canadian film director
- Lawrence Trent (born 1986), English chess player
- Nathan Trent (born 1992), Austrian singer
- Robert H. Trent (1936–2012), American state legislator and mining engineer
- Sybil Trent (1926–2000), American actress
- Tererai Trent (born c. 1965), Zimbabwean philanthropist
- William Trent (1715–1787), colonial American fur trader and merchant, founder of Trenton, New Jersey

== Fictional characters ==
- Trent Crimm, in the television series Ted Lasso
- Trent Easton, in the video game franchise Perfect Dark
- Trent Fernandez, White Dino Ranger from Power Rangers: Dino Thunder
- Trent Lane, in the MTV animated series Daria
- Edison Trent, main character of the video game Freelancer
- Jack and Lucy-Ann Trent, in The Adventure Series by Enid Blyton
- Nell Trent, heroine of Charles Dickens' The Old Curiosity Shop
- Philip Trent, gentleman sleuth of the E.C. Bentley novels
- Zoe Trent, in the 2012 animated series Littlest Pet Shop
- Trent, one of the Magicians of Xanth
- Trent (Total Drama Island), in the Canadian animated series Total Drama
- Trent Maddock, in the CW television series Crazy Ex-Girlfriend
- Trent Walker, in the 1996 film Swingers, portrayed by Vince Vaughn
- Kurtis Trent, the secondary protagonist of the 2003 video game Tomb Raider: The Angel of Darkness

== See also ==
- Trent (disambiguation)
