= 2010 Carolina Panthers season =

NFL team season

- Owner: Jerry Richardson
- General manager: Marty Hurney
- Head coach: John Fox
- Home stadium: Bank of America Stadium

Results
- Record: 2–14
- Division place: 4th NFC South
- Playoffs: Did not qualify
- Pro Bowlers: T Jordan Gross; C Ryan Kalil; ILB Jon Beason

The 2010 season was the Carolina Panthers' 16th in the National Football League (NFL), and their ninth and final season under head coach John Fox. They entered the season trying to improve on their 8–8 record from 2009, but failed to do so with a record of 2–14 and were officially eliminated from postseason contention in Week 11. It was the franchise's worst record between going 1–15 in 2001 and finishing 2–15 in 2023. The Panthers finished last in the NFC South for the first time since 2002. In Week 16, the team clinched the NFL's worst record of the year and earned the #1 pick in the 2011 NFL draft. They would go on to select quarterback Cam Newton with that pick. On December 31, 2010, it was announced that the contracts of Fox and his entire coaching staff would not be renewed.

This was the first season since 2001 that Julius Peppers was not on the opening-day roster, as he signed with the Chicago Bears (although he would return for a second and final spell in 2017).

== Offseason ==
=== NFL draft ===
The Panthers did not have a first round pick in the 2010 draft as it was traded to the San Francisco 49ers in a deal that got the Panthers a second and fourth round pick in the 2009 NFL draft. The Panthers also traded their fifth round pick to the Kansas City Chiefs for defensive tackle Tank Tyler, and their sixth round pick to the Cleveland Browns for defensive tackle Louis Leonard. The Panthers acquired a sixth round pick from the Oakland Raiders from a trade in the 2009 draft that sent a 2009 seventh round pick to the Raiders.

Carolina Panthers 2010 NFL Draft selections
Draft order			Player name	Position	Height	Weight	College	Contract	Notes
Round	Choice	Overall	Player name	Position	Height	Weight	College	Contract	Notes
1	17	17	Traded to the San Francisco 49ers						
2	16	48	Jimmy Clausen	Quarterback	6'3"	227	Notre Dame		
3	14	78	Brandon LaFell	Wide receiver	6'2"	211	LSU		
3	25	89	Armanti Edwards	Wide receiver	5'11"	187	Appalachian State		From Arizona Cardinals through New York Jets
4	26	124	Eric Norwood	Linebacker	6'1"	248	South Carolina		From Arizona Cardinals through New England Patriots
5	13	144	Traded to the Kansas City Chiefs						
6	6	175	Greg Hardy	Defensive end	6'5"	281	Mississippi		From Oakland Raiders
6	17	187	Traded to the Cleveland Browns						
6	29	175	David Gettis	Wide receiver	6'3"	217	Baylor		From New York Jets
6	33	202	Jordan Pugh	Defensive back	5'11"	200	Texas A&M		Compensatory selection
6	35	204	Tony Pike	Quarterback	6'6"	223	Cincinnati		Compensatory selection
7	16	223	R.J. Stanford	Defensive back	5'11"	180	Utah		
7	42	249	Robert McClain	Defensive back	5'9"	195	Connecticut		Compensatory selection

=== Free agent signings ===
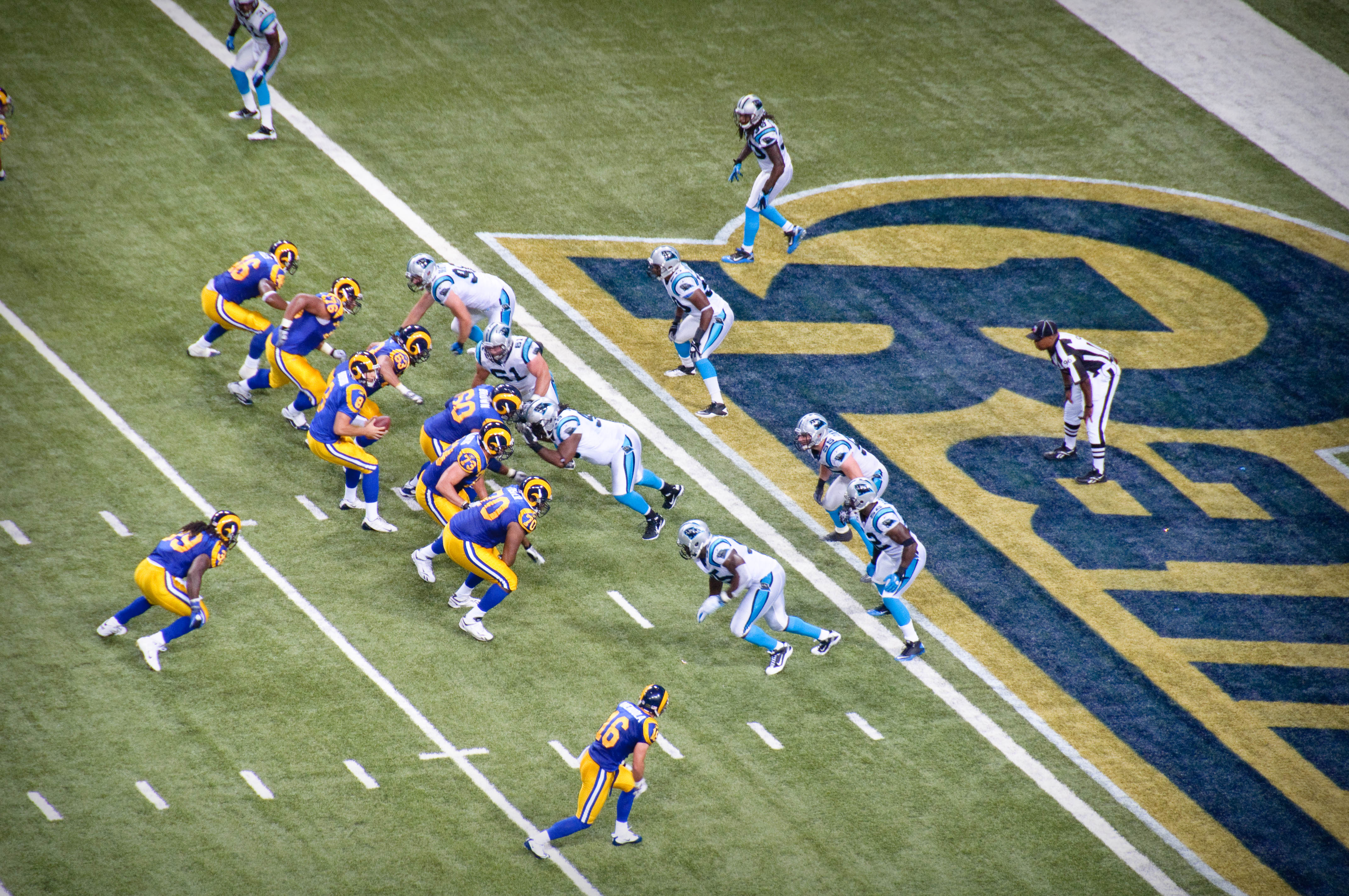
Carolina at St. Louis in week 8 of the season, on October 31, 2010

Position	Player	Experience	College
C	Steve Justice	3rd Year	Wake Forest
WR	Wallace Wright	3rd Year	North Carolina
DB	Marcus Hudson	4th Year	North Carolina State
DT	Ed Johnson	4th Year	Penn State
FS	Aaron Francisco	5th Year	BYU
K	Todd Carter	1st Year	Grand Valley State
CB	Brian Witherspoon	3rd Year	Stillman College

==== Roster releases and waivers ====
Position	Player	2010 Team
QB	Jake Delhomme	Cleveland Browns
DT	Damione Lewis	New England Patriots
LB	Landon Johnson	Detroit Lions
LB	Na'il Diggs	St. Louis Rams
FB	Brad Hoover	Retired
DT	Maake Kemoeatu	Washington Redskins
K	Rhys Lloyd	Minnesota Vikings
QB	A.J. Feely	St. Louis Rams
WR	Muhsin Muhammad	Retired
DE	Julius Peppers	Chicago Bears
QB	Josh McCown	Hartford Colonials
DB	Quinton Teal	Seattle Seahawks
DT	Hollis Thomas	Retired
G	Keydrick Vincent	Tampa Bay Buccaneers
DB	Dante Wesley	Detroit Lions

== Roster ==
2010 Carolina Panthers roster
Quarterbacks (QB): 2 Jimmy Clausen; 9 Keith Null; 6 Brian St. Pierre; Running backs (RB): 33 Mike Goodson KR; 38 Rashawn Jackson FB; 28 Jonathan Stewart; 22 Tyrell Sutton; Wide receivers (WR): 87 David Clowney; 10 Armanti Edwards; 12 David Gettis; 11 Brandon LaFell; 89 Steve Smith; Tight ends (TE): 82 Gary Barnidge; 47 Jeff King; 88 Dante Rosario	Offensive linemen (OL): 73 Mackenzy Bernadeau G; 71 C. J. Davis G; 69 Jordan Gross T; 67 Ryan Kalil C; 63 Chris Morris C/G; 64 Rob Petitti T; 74 Geoff Schwartz G/T; 65 Garry Williams T; Defensive linemen (DL): 96 Tyler Brayton DE; 76 Greg Hardy DE; 98 Nick Hayden DT; 60 Corvey Irvin DT; 95 Charles Johnson DE; 99 Ed Johnson DT; 61 Derek Landri DT; 68 Andre Neblett DT; 92 Eric Norwood DE	Linebackers (LB): 50 James Anderson OLB; 52 Jon Beason; 59 Nic Harris OLB; 56 Abdul Hodge MLB; 57 Jordan Senn OLB; 46 Thomas Williams MLB; Defensive backs (DB): 21 Gerald Alexander SS; 20 Chris Gamble CB; 30 Charles Godfrey SS; 25 Marcus Hudson SS; 31 Richard Marshall CB; 23 Sherrod Martin FS; 36 Robert McClain CB; 41 Captain Munnerlyn; 29 Jordan Pugh FS; 35 R. J. Stanford CB; 27 C. J. Wilson CB; Special teams (ST): 7 Jason Baker P; 44 J. J. Jansen LS; 4 John Kasay K; 8 Rhys Lloyd K	Practice squad: 78 Jacob Bender T; 43 Derrick Doggett LB; 62 Tommie Duhart DT; 84 Trent Guy WR; 14 Marcus Henry WR (IR); 75 Shawn Murphy G; 77 Dan Santucci C; 40 Josh Vaughan RB; 49 Sean Ware LB (IR); Reserve: 91 Everette Brown DE (IR); 55 Dan Connor MLB (IR); 58 Thomas Davis OLB (PUP); 42 Tony Fiammetta FB (IR); 83 Charly Martin WR (IR); 3 Matt Moore QB (IR); 79 Jeff Otah T (IR); 16 Tony Pike QB (IR); 72 Duke Robinson G (Susp.); 97 Hilee Taylor DE (IR); 70 Travelle Wharton G (IR); 34 DeAngelo Williams RB (IR); 53 Jamar Williams OLB (IR); 54 Jason Williams OLB (IR); 15 Wallace Wright WR (IR); Rookies in italics 53 active, 17 reserve, 7 practice squad

== Staff ==
Carolina Panthers 2010 staff
Front office: Owner/founder – Jerry Richardson; President – Danny Morrison; General manager – Marty Hurney; Director of football operations – Brandon Beane; Director of team administration – Rob Rogers; Football operations coordinator – Bryan Porter; Director of pro scouting – Mark Koncz; Director of college scouting – Don Gregory; National scout – Jeff Morrow; National scout – Mike Szabo; Executive assistant to the head coach – Linda O'Hora; Head coaches: Head coach – John Fox; Assistant head coach/running backs – Jim Skipper; Offensive coaches: Offensive coordinator – Jeff Davidson; Quarterbacks – Rip Scherer; Wide receivers – Tyke Tolbert; Offensive line – Dave Magazu; Offensive quality control/tight ends – Geep Chryst	Defensive coaches: Defensive coordinator – Ron Meeks; Defensive line – Brian Baker; Linebackers – Richard Smith; Defensive Backs (Secondary) – Mike Gillhamer; Defensive backs – Ron Milus; Defensive quality control – Sam Mills III; Special teams coaches: Special teams coordinator – Jeff Rodgers; Special teams assistant – Sam Garnes; Strength and conditioning: Strength and conditioning – Jerry Simmons

== Schedule ==
=== Preseason ===
The Panthers preseason schedule was announced on March 31, 2010.

Week	Date	Kickoff	Opponent	Results		Game site	NFL.com recap
Week	Date	Kickoff	Opponent	Final score	Team record	Game site	NFL.com recap
1	August 12	8:00 p.m. EDT	at Baltimore Ravens	**L** 12–17	0–1	M&T Bank Stadium	Recap
2	August 21	8:00 p.m. EDT	New York Jets	**L** 3–9	0–2	Bank of America Stadium	Recap
3	August 28	8:00 p.m. EDT	Tennessee Titans	**W** 15–7	1–2	Bank of America Stadium	Recap
4	September 2	7:30 p.m. EDT	at Pittsburgh Steelers	**L** 3–19	1–3	Heinz Field	Recap

=== Regular season ===
Week	Date	Kickoff	Opponent	Results		Game site	NFL.com recap
Week	Date	Kickoff	Opponent	Final score	Team record	Game site	NFL.com recap
1	September 12	1:00 p.m. EDT	at New York Giants	**L** 18–31	0–1	New Meadowlands Stadium	Recap
2	September 19	1:00 p.m. EDT	**Tampa Bay Buccaneers**	**L** 7–20	0–2	Bank of America Stadium	Recap
3	September 26	1:00 p.m. EDT	Cincinnati Bengals	**L** 7–20	0–3	Bank of America Stadium	Recap
4	October 3	1:00 p.m. EDT	at **New Orleans Saints**	**L** 14–16	0–4	Louisiana Superdome	Recap
5	October 10	1:00 p.m. EDT	Chicago Bears	**L** 6–23	0–5	Bank of America Stadium	Recap
6	Bye						
7	October 24	1:00 p.m. EDT	San Francisco 49ers	**W** 23–20	1–5	Bank of America Stadium	Recap
8	October 31	1:00 p.m. EDT	at St. Louis Rams	**L**10–20	1–6	Edward Jones Dome	Recap
9	November 7	1:00 p.m. EST	**New Orleans Saints**	**L** 3–34	1–7	Bank of America Stadium	Recap
10	November 14	1:00 p.m. EST	at **Tampa Bay Buccaneers**	**L** 16–31	1–8	Raymond James Stadium	Recap
11	November 21	1:00 p.m. EST	Baltimore Ravens	**L** 13–37	1–9	Bank of America Stadium	Recap
12	November 28	1:00 p.m. EST	at Cleveland Browns	**L** 23–24	1–10	Cleveland Browns Stadium	Recap
13	December 5	4:15 p.m. EST	at Seattle Seahawks	**L** 14–31	1–11	Qwest Field	Recap
14	December 12	1:00 p.m. EST	**Atlanta Falcons**	**L** 10–31	1–12	Bank of America Stadium	Recap
15	December 19	1:00 p.m. EST	Arizona Cardinals	**W** 19–12	2–12	Bank of America Stadium	Recap
16	December 23	8:20 p.m. EST	at Pittsburgh Steelers	**L** 3–27	2–13	Heinz Field	Recap
17	January 2	1:00 p.m. EST	at **Atlanta Falcons**	**L** 10–31	2–14	Georgia Dome	Recap
NOTE: Division games are in **bold** text.

=== Standings ===
NFC South
	W	L	T	PCT	DIV	CONF	PF	PA	STK
^{(1)} Atlanta Falcons	13	3	0	.813	5–1	10–2	414	288	W1
^{(5)} New Orleans Saints	11	5	0	.688	4–2	9–3	384	307	L1
Tampa Bay Buccaneers	10	6	0	.625	3–3	8–4	343	318	W2
Carolina Panthers	2	14	0	.125	0–6	2–10	196	408	L2

== Regular season results ==
=== Week 1: at New York Giants ===
Week 1: Carolina Panthers at New York Giants – Game summary

Quarter	1	2	3	4	Total
Panthers	3	13	0	2	18
Giants	7	7	10	7	31

at New Meadowlands Stadium, East Rutherford, New Jersey

- Date: September 12
- Game time: 1:00 p.m. EDT
- Game weather: 64 °F (17.8 °C) (Light Rain)
- Game attendance: 77,245
- Referee: Jerome Boger
- TV announcers (FOX): Kenny Albert, Daryl Johnston and Tony Siragusa
- Game Book Recap

Game information

First quarter

- CAR – John Kasay 21-yard field goal, Panthers 3–0, Drive: 7 plays, 26 yards, 3:39.
- NYG – Hakeem Nicks 26-yard pass from Eli Manning (Lawrence Tynes kick), Giants 7–3, Drive: 7 plays, 68 yards, 3:40.

Second quarter

- CAR – John Kasay 52-yard field goal, Giants 7–6, Drive: 7 plays, 21 yards, 3:20.
- CAR – John Kasay 43-yard field goal, Panthers 9–7, Drive: 7 plays, 39 yards, 2:07.
- NYG – Hakeem Nicks 19-yard pass from Eli Manning (Lawrence Tynes kick), Giants 14–9, Drive: 7 plays, 80 yards, 1:01.
- CAR – Steve Smith 19-yard pass from Matt Moore (John Kasay kick), Panthers 16–14, Drive: 5 plays, 50 yards, 0:42.

Third quarter

- NYG – Lawrence Tynes 32-yard field goal, Giants 17–16, Drive: 11 plays, 60 yards, 5:57.
- NYG – Hakeem Nicks 5-yard pass from Eli Manning (Lawrence Tynes kick), Giants 24–16, Drive: 5 plays, 38 yards, 2:48.

Fourth quarter

- NYG – Ahmad Bradshaw 4-yard run (Lawrence Tynes kick), Giants 31–16, Drive: 6 plays, 52 yards, 3:24.
- CAR – Punt blocked by Greg Hardy out of bounds in end zone for a Safety, Giants 31–18.

Top passers

- CAR – Matt Moore – 14/33, 182 yards, 1 touchdown, 3 interceptions
- NYG – Eli Manning – 20/30, 263 yards, 3 touchdowns, 3 interceptions

Top rushers

- CAR – DeAngelo Williams – 16 rushes, 62 yards
- NYG – Ahmad Bradshaw – 20 rushes, 76 yards, 1 touchdown

Top receivers

- CAR – Steve Smith – 5 receptions, 75 yards, 1 touchdown
- NYG – Mario Manningham – 4 receptions, 85 yards

Top tacklers

- CAR – Dan Connor – 10 tackles, 3 assists, 1 sack
- NYG – Antrel Rolle – 7 tackles, 1 assist

The Panthers began their season at New Meadowlands Stadium for an NFC duel with the New York Giants. In the first quarter, Carolina got the stadium's very first points with kicker John Kasay nailing a 21-yard field goal. The Giants would answer with quarterback Eli Manning making a 26-yard touchdown pass to wide receiver Hakeem Nicks. In the second quarter, the Panthers slowly retook the lead with Kasay hitting on 52 and 43-yard field goals. The Giants responded with Manning getting a 19-yard touchdown pass to Nicks, but the Panthers replied with quarterback Matt Moore making a 19-yard touchdown pass to wide receiver Steve Smith.

In the third quarter, the Panthers fell behind when kicker Lawrence Tynes made a 32-yard field goal, which was extended further with Manning making a 5-yard touchdown pass to Nicks, followed in the fourth quarter by running back Ahmad Bradshaw getting a 4-yard touchdown run. After this point, the Panthers tried to mount a comeback when rookie defensive end Greg Hardy blocked a punt out of the back of the end zone for a safety, but the Giants' defense prevented anything else happening.

With the loss, the Panthers began the season at 0–1.

=== Week 2: vs. Tampa Bay Buccaneers ===
Week 2: Tampa Bay Buccaneers at Carolina Panthers – Game summary

Quarter	1	2	3	4	Total
Buccaneers	7	7	3	3	20
Panthers	0	7	0	0	7

at Bank of America Stadium, Charlotte, North Carolina

- Date: September 19
- Game time: 1:00 p.m. EDT
- Game weather: 89 °F (31.7 °C) (Sunny)
- Game attendance: 72,577
- Referee: Walt Coleman
- TV announcers (FOX): Dick Stockton, Charles Davis, Jim Mora & Laura Okmin
- Recap

Game information

First quarter

- TB – Earnest Graham 14-yard pass from Josh Freeman (Connor Barth kick), Buccaneers 7–0, Drive: 8 plays, 54 yards, 3:59.

Second quarter

- CAR – Steve Smith 37-yard pass from Matt Moore (John Kasay kick), Tied 7–7, Drive: 6 plays, 88 yards, 4:00.
- TB – Mike Williams 35-yard pass from Josh Freeman (Connor Barth kick)), Buccaneers 14–7, Drive: 8 plays, 80 yards, 4:00.

Third quarter

- TB – Connor Barth 24-yard field goal, Buccaneers 17–7, Drive: 6 plays, 19 yards, 3:09.

Fourth quarter

- TB – Connor Barth 33-yard field goal, Buccaneers 20–7, Drive: 10 plays, 50 yards, 4:51.

Top passers

- TB – Josh Freeman – 12/24, 178 yards, 2 touchdowns
- CAR – Matt Moore – 6/16, 125 yards, 1 touchdown, 1 interception

Top rushers

- TB – Cadillac Williams – 27 rushes, 51 yards
- CAR – DeAngelo Williams – 17 rushes, 54 yards

Top receivers

- TB – Kellen Winslow – 4 receptions, 83 yards
- CAR – Steve Smith – 3 receptions, 66 yards, 1 touchdown

Top tacklers

- TB – Barrett Ruud – 6 tackles, 3 assists
- CAR – James Anderson – 8 tackles, 2 assists

Looking for their first win of the season, the Panthers flew home for a divisional duel against the Tampa Bay Buccaneers. In the first quarter, Tampa Bay struck first with Josh Freeman's 14-yard touchdown pass to running back Earnest Graham. The Panthers responded with Matt Moore throwing a 37-yard touchdown pass to wide receiver Steve Smith. The Buccaneers' defense dominated, holding running backs Jonathan Stewart and DeAngelo Williams to 43 and 54 yards rushing, respectively. Moore completed 6 out of 16 passes with one touchdown and one interception, while being sacked four times. After losing a fumble, he was benched in favor of rookie Jimmy Clausen in hopes for a rally, however the Buccaneers defense prevented any further progress.

With the loss, the Panthers fell to 0–2 for the second straight season.

=== Week 3: vs. Cincinnati Bengals ===
Week 3: Cincinnati Bengals at Carolina Panthers – Game summary

Quarter	1	2	3	4	Total
Bengals	7	3	0	10	20
Panthers	0	0	7	0	7

at Bank of America Stadium, Charlotte, North Carolina

- Date: September 26
- Game time: 1:00 p.m. EDT
- Game weather: 67 °F (19.4 °C) (Showers)
- Game attendance: 72,887
- Referee: Pete Morelli
- TV announcers (CBS): Bill Macatee and Rich Gannon
- Recap

Game information

First quarter

- CIN – Cedric Benson 1-yard run (Mike Nugent kick), Bengals 7–0, Drive: 8 plays, 53 yards, 4:33.

Second quarter

- CIN – Mike Nugent 33-yard field goal, Bengals 10–0, Drive: 9 plays, 27 yards, 4:13.

Third quarter

- CAR – Jonathan Stewart 1-yard run (John Kasay kick), Bengals 10–7, Drive: 8 plays, 75 yards, 3:23.

Fourth quarter

- CIN – Mike Nugent 50-yard field goal, Bengals 13–7, Drive: 7 plays, 18 yards, 2:51.
- CIN – Cedric Benson 7-yard pass from Carson Palmer, Bengals 20–7, Drive: 3 plays, 37 yards, 0:53.

Top passers

- CIN – Carson Palmer – 19/37, 195 yards, 1 touchdown, 2 interceptions
- CAR – Jimmy Clausen – 16/33, 188 yards, 1 interception

Top rushers

- CIN – Cedric Benson – 27 rushes, 81 yards, 1 touchdown
- CAR – DeAngelo Williams – 10 rushes, 64 yards

Top receivers

- CIN – Jermaine Gresham – 4 receptions, 59 yards
- CAR – Mike Goodson – 4 receptions, 47 yards

Top tacklers

- CIN – Rey Maualuga – 4 tackles, 2 assists
- CAR – Charles Godfrey – 9 tackles, 2 assists, 1 interception

Still searching for their first win of the season, the Panthers stayed at home for their Week 3 interconference duel with the Cincinnati Bengals. With quarterback Matt Moore struggling, rookie quarterback Jimmy Clausen was given the start.

Carolina would trail in the first half as Bengals running back Cedric Benson got a 1-yard touchdown run in the first quarter, followed by kicker Mike Nugent's 33-yard field goal in the second quarter. The Panthers would strike back in the third quarter as running back Jonathan Stewart got a 1-yard touchdown run, but Cincinnati would close out the game in the fourth quarter as Nugent nailed a 50-yard field goal, followed by quarterback Carson Palmer's 7-yard touchdown pass to Benson.

With the loss, Carolina fell to 0–3.

=== Week 4: at New Orleans Saints ===
Week 4: Carolina Panthers at New Orleans Saints – Game summary

Quarter	1	2	3	4	Total
Panthers	0	7	7	0	14
Saints	0	10	3	3	16

at Louisiana Superdome, New Orleans, Louisiana

- Date: October 3
- Game time: 1:00 p.m. EDT
- Game weather: None (dome stadium)
- Game attendance: 70,016
- Referee: John Parry
- TV announcers (FOX): Kenny Albert, Daryl Johnston and Tony Siragusa
- Recap

Game information

First quarter

- No scoring plays

Second quarter

- NO – Lance Moore 4-yard pass from Drew Brees (John Carney kick), Saints 7–0, Drive: 6 plays, 76 yards, 2:27.
- CAR – Jonathan Stewart 55-yard pass from Jimmy Clausen (John Kasay kick), Tied 7–7, Drive: 5 plays, 72 yards, 2:40.
- NO – John Carney 32-yard field goal, Saints 10–7, Drive: 13 plays, 63 yards, 4:32.

Third quarter

- CAR – DeAngelo Williams 39-yard run (John Kasay kick), Panthers 14–10, Drive: 7 plays, 80 yards, 2:55.
- NO – John Carney 32-yard field goal, Panthers 14–13, Drive: 5 plays, 15 yards, 2:49.

Fourth quarter

- NO – John Carney 25-yard field goal, Saints 16–14, Drive: 18 plays, 86 yards, 9:25.

Top passers

- CAR – Jimmy Clausen – 11/21, 146 yards, 1 touchdown
- NO – Drew Brees – 33/48, 275 yards, 1 touchdown

Top rushers

- CAR – DeAngelo Williams – 13 rushes, 86 yards, 1 touchdown
- NO – Chris Ivory – 12 rushes, 67 yards

Top receivers

- CAR – Jonathan Stewart – 1 reception, 55 yards, 1 touchdown
- NO – Devery Henderson – 6 receptions, 59 yards

Top tacklers

- CAR – James Anderson – 12 tackles, 2 assists, 1.0 sack, 1 forced fumble
- NO – Usama Young – 5 tackles, 1 assist, 1.0 sack

Still looking for their first win the Panthers flew to Louisiana Superdome for an NFC South rivalry match against the Saints. In the first quarter Carolina trailed early as quarterback Drew Brees completed a 4-yard touchdown pass to wide receiver Lance Moore. Carolina replied with quarterback Jimmy Clausen making a 55-yard touchdown pass to running back Jonathan Stewart. The Panthers trailed when kicker John Carney nailed a 32-yard field goal, but took the lead when running back DeAngelo Williams made a 39-yard touchdown run. Then John Carney made two field goals to give the Panthers a loss. He made a 32-yard field goal in the 3rd quarter and a 25-yard field goal in the 4th.

With the close loss, the Panthers fell to 0–4.

=== Week 5: vs. Chicago Bears ===
Week 5: Chicago Bears at Carolina Panthers – Game summary

Quarter	1	2	3	4	Total
Bears	17	0	0	6	23
Panthers	3	0	3	0	6

at Bank of America Stadium, Charlotte, North Carolina

- Date: October 10
- Game time: 12:00 p.m. CDT
- Game weather: 81 °F (27.2 °C) (Sunny)
- Game attendance: 73,464
- Referee: Mike Carey
- TV announcers (FOX): Sam Rosen and Tim Ryan
- Recap

Game information

First quarter

- CHI – Matt Forte 18-yard run (Robbie Gould kick), Bears 7–0, Drive: 4 plays, 38 yards, 1:45.
- CAR – John Kasay 24-yard field goal, Bears 7–3, Drive: 9 plays, 55 yards, 5:23.
- CHI – Matt Forte 68-yard run, Bears 14–3, Drive: 1 plays, 68 yards, 0:17.
- CHI – Robbie Gould 28-yard field goal, Bears 17–3, Drive: 5 plays, 17 yards, 1:43.

Second quarter

- No scoring plays

Third quarter

- CAR – John Kasay 53-yard field goal, Bears 17–6, Drive: 7 plays, 8 yards, 2:52.

Fourth quarter

- CHI – Robbie Gould 53-yard field goal, Bears 20–6, Drive: 6 plays, 15 yards, 2:27.
- CHI – Robbie Gould 43-yard field goal, Bears 23–6, Drive: 4 plays, −2 yards, 1:27.

Top passers

- CHI – Todd Collins – 6/16, 32 yards, 4 interceptions
- CAR – Jimmy Clausen – 9/22, 61 yards, 1 interception

Top rushers

- CHI – Matt Forte – 22 rushes, 166 yards, 2 touchdowns
- CAR – DeAngelo Williams – 12 rushes, 51 yards

Top receivers

- CHI – Matt Forte – 2 receptions, 22 yards
- CAR – David Gettis – 3 receptions, 32 yards

Top tacklers

- CHI – Chris Harris – 5 tackles, 2 assists
- CAR – Dan Connor – 6 tackles, 5 assists

Still looking for a win the Panthers played on home ground for an interdivisional NFC duel with the Bears. In the first quarter the Panthers trailed early as running back Matt Forte got an 18-yard touchdown run. The Panthers replied with kicker John Kasay making a 24-yard field goal. The Panthers fell further behind with Forte making a 68-yard touchdown run, followed by a 28-yard field goal from kicker Robbie Gould. In the third quarter the Panthers replied with Kasay making a 53-yard field goal, but in the 4th quarter the Bears pulled away when Gould made a 53 and a 43-yard field goal.

With the loss, Carolina entered their bye week at 0–5.

=== Week 7: vs. San Francisco 49ers ===
Week 7: San Francisco 49ers at Carolina Panthers – Game summary

Quarter	1	2	3	4	Total
49ers	7	3	0	10	20
Panthers	3	7	3	10	23

at Bank of America Stadium, Charlotte, North Carolina

- Date: October 24
- Game time: 1:00 p.m. EDT
- Game weather: 75 °F (23.9 °C) (Sunny)
- Game attendance: 72,741
- Referee: Ron Winter
- TV announcers (Fox): Sam Rosen and Tim Ryan
- Recap

Game information

First quarter

- SF – Vernon Davis 1-yard pass from Alex Smith (Joe Nedney kick), 49ers 7–0, Drive: 4 plays, 74 yards, 1:42.
- CAR – John Kasay 47-yard field goal, 49ers 7–3, Drive: 10 plays, 36 yards, 4:46.

Second quarter

- SF – Joe Nedney 24-yard field goal, 49ers 10–3, Drive: 8 plays, 50 yards, 3:49.
- CAR – David Gettis 18-yard pass from Matt Moore (John Kasay kick), Tied 10–10, Drive: 10 plays, 80 yards, 6:16.

Third quarter

- CAR – John Kasay 55-yard field goal, Panthers 13–10, Drive: 8 plays, 20 yards, 3:58.

Fourth quarter

- SF – Joe Nedney 38-yard field goal, Tied 13–13, Drive: 8 plays, 39 yards, 4:14.
- SF – Ray McDonald 31-yard interception return (Joe Nedney kick), 49ers 20–13.
- CAR – David Gettis 23 yad pass from Matt Moore (John Kasay kick), Tied 20–20, Drive: 8 plays, 63 yards, 2:37.
- CAR – John Kasay 37-yard field goal, Panthers 23–20, Drive: 5 plays, 38 yards, 0:29.

Top passers

- SF – Alex Smith – 9/19, 129 yards, 1 touchdown
- CAR – Matt Moore – 28/41, 308 yards, 2 touchdowns, 1 interception

Top rushers

- SF – Frank Gore – 19 rushes, 102 yards
- CAR – DeAngelo Williams – 19 rushes, 44 yards

Top receivers

- SF – Vernon Davis – 4 receptions, 74 yards
- CAR – David Gettis – 8 receptions, 125 yards, 2 touchdowns

Top tacklers

- SF – Patrick Willis – 8 tackles, 3 assists
- CAR – James Anderson – 6 tackles, 1 assist

Coming off their bye week the Panthers played on home ground for another interdivisional duel with the San Francisco 49ers. In the first quarter the Panthers trailed early as quarterback Alex Smith got a 1-yard touchdown pass to tight end Vernon Davis. The lead was cut when kicker John Kasay nailed a 47-yard field goal. The 49ers scored with kicker Joe Nedney making a 24-yard field goal. The Panthers managed to tie the game with quarterback Matt Moore completing an 18-yard touchdown pass to wide receiver David Gettis. They took the lead in the third quarter with Kasay booting a 55-yard field goal. They eventually trailed again in the fourth quarter with Nedney hitting a 38-yard field goal, and with defensive end Ray McDonald returning an interception 31 yards for a touchdown. However, the Panthers tied the game for the second time with Moore finding Gettis again on a 23-yard touchdown pass. After the game was tied Kasay successfully put away a 37-yard field goal to give the Panthers their first win of the season out of six games, improving them to 1–5.

=== Week 8: at St. Louis Rams ===
Week 8: Carolina Panthers at St. Louis Rams – Game summary

Quarter	1	2	3	4	Total
Panthers	0	3	0	7	10
Rams	0	10	0	10	20

at Edward Jones Dome, St. Louis, Missouri

- Date: October 31
- Game time: 1:00 p.m. EDT
- Game weather: None (dome stadium)
- Game attendance: 52,281
- Referee: Carl Cheffers
- TV announcers (Fox): Dick Stockton, Charles Davis, Jim Mora & Laura Okmin
- Recap

Game information

First quarter

- No scoring plays

Second quarter

- STL – Josh Brown 33-yard field goal, Rams 3–0, Drive: 13 plays, 55 yards, 6:57.
- STL – Danny Amendola 2-yard pass from Sam Bradford (Josh Brown kick), Rams 10–0, Drive: 11 plays, 55 yards, 6:18.
- CAR – John Kasay 44-yard field goal, Rams 10–3, Drive: 7 plays, 43 yards, 1:30.

Third quarter

- No scoring plays

Fourth quarter

- STL – Daniel Fells 23-yard pass from Sam Bradford (Josh Brown kick), Rams 17–3, Drive: 5 plays, 43 yards, 2:44.
- STL – Josh Brown 41-yard field goal, Rams 20–3, Drive: 7 plays, 5 yards, 3:53.
- CAR – Brandon LaFell 17-yard pass from Matt Moore (John Kasay kick), Rams 20–10, Drive: 12 plays, 80 yards, 2:58.

Top passers

- CAR – Matt Moore – 23/37, 194 yards, 1 touchdown, 3 interceptions
- STL – Sam Bradford – 25/32, 191 yards, 2 touchdowns

Top rushers

- CAR – Jonathan Stewart – 14 rushes, 30 yards
- STL – Steven Jackson – 23 rushes, 59 yards

Top receivers

- CAR – Steve Smith – 9 receptions, 85 yards
- STL – Brandon Gibson – 6 receptions, 67 yards

Top tacklers

- CAR – Richard Marshall – 9 tackles
- STL – James Laurinaitis – 7 tackles, 1 assist, 1.0 sack, 1 interception

Coming off their win over the 49ers the Panthers flew to Edward Jones Dome for an NFC duel with the Rams. In the second quarter the Panthers trailed early as kicker Josh Brown nailed a 33-yard field goal. This was followed by quarterback Sam Bradford completing a 2-yard touchdown pass to wide receiver Danny Amendola. The Panthers replied with kicker John Kasay making a 44-yard field goal. The Panthers fell further behind in the fourth quarter with Bradford finding tight end Daniel Fells on a 23-yard touchdown pass, followed by Brown getting a 41-yard field goal. The Panthers responded with quarterback Matt Moore making a 17-yard touchdown pass to wide receiver Brandon LaFell.

With the loss, Carolina fell to 1–6.

=== Week 9: vs. New Orleans Saints ===
Week 9: New Orleans Saints at Carolina Panthers – Game summary

Quarter	1	2	3	4	Total
Saints	7	10	10	7	34
Panthers	3	0	0	0	3

at Bank of America Stadium, Charlotte, North Carolina

- Date: November 7
- Game time: 1:00 p.m. EST
- Game weather: 50 °F (10 °C) (Sunny)
- Game attendance: 73,191
- Referee: Ed Hochuli
- TV announcers (Fox): Dick Stockton, Charles Davis, Jim Mora & Laura Okmin
- Recap

Game information

First quarter

- CAR – John Kasay 20-yard field goal, Panthers 3–0, Drive: 6 plays, 26 yards, 2:55.
- NO – Jeremy Shockey 7-yard pass from Drew Brees (Garrett Hartley kick), Saints 7–3, Drive: 7 plays, 27 yards, 3:03.

Second quarter

- NO – Jimmy Graham 19-yard pass from Drew Brees (Garrett Hartley kick), Saints 14–3, Drive: 9 plays, 73 yards, 5:14.
- NO – Garrett Hartley 31-yard field goal, Saints 17–3, Drive: 7 plays, 70 yards, 0:54.

Third quarter

- NO – Garrett Hartley 36-yard field goal, Saints 20–3, Drive: 11 plays, 39 yards, 5:02.
- NO – Jabari Greer 24-yard interception return (Garrett Hartley kick), Saints 27–3.

Fourth quarter

- NO – Ladell Betts 1-yard run (Garrett Hartley kick), Saints 34–3, Drive: 10 plays, 52 yards, 5:20.

Top passers

- NO – Drew Brees – 27/43, 253 yards, 2 touchdowns, 1 interception
- CAR – Jimmy Clausen – 8/18, 47 yards, 1 interception

Top rushers

- NO – Julius Jones – 6 rushes, 68 yards
- CAR – Tyrell Sutton – 7 rushes, 41 yards

Top receivers

- NO – Lance Moore – 6 receptions, 77 yards
- CAR – David Gettis – 2 receptions, 22 yards

Top tacklers

- NO – Roman Harper – 9 tackles, 1.0 sack
- CAR – James Anderson – 9 tackles

Hoping to rebound from their loss to the Rams the Panthers played on home ground for an NFC South rivalry match against the Saints. In the first quarter the Panthers took the lead after kicker John Kasay made a 20-yard field goal. Then they conceded a large scoring run after quarterback Drew Brees completed a 7-yard touchdown pass to tight end Jeremy Shockey, followed by Brees finding tight end Jimmy Graham on a 19-yard touchdown pass. The lead was extended by kicker Garrett Hartley as he nailed a 31 and a 36-yard field goal. The Panthers had more problems after quarterback Jimmy Clausen's pass was intercepted by cornerback Jabari Greer and returned 24 yards for a touchdown. This was followed by running back Ladell Betts getting a 1-yard touchdown run. This was Tony Pike's only game of his career.

With the loss, the Panthers fell to 1–7, and were swept by the Saints for the first time since 2001.

=== Week 10: at Tampa Bay Buccaneers ===
Week 10: Carolina Panthers at Tampa Bay Buccaneers – Game summary

Quarter	1	2	3	4	Total
Panthers	3	7	3	3	16
Buccaneers	7	14	0	10	31

at Raymond James Stadium, Tampa, Florida

- Date: November 14
- Game time: 1:00 p.m. EST
- Game weather: 73 °F (22.8 °C) (Sunny)
- Game attendance: 44,264
- Referee: Jerome Boger
- TV announcers (Fox): Dick Stockton, Charles Davis, Jim Mora and Laura Okmin
- Recap

Game information

First quarter

- TB – Arrelious Benn 8-yard pass from Josh Freeman (Connor Barth kick), Buccaneers 7–0, Drive: 4 plays, 47 yards, 2:07.
- CAR – John Kasay 46-yard field goal, Buccaneers 7–3, Drive: 7 plays, 14 yards, 3:33.

Second quarter

- TB – LeGarrette Blount 17-yard run (Connor Barth kick), Buccaneers 14–3, Drive: 6 plays, 87 yards, 3:29.
- CAR – Josh Vaughan 2-yard run (John Kasay kick), Buccaneers 14–10, Drive: 6 plays, 46 yards, 2:32.
- TB – Kellen Winslow 20-yard pass from Josh Freeman (Connor Barth kick), Buccaneers 21–10, Drive: 8 plays, 65 yards, 3:15.

Third quarter

- CAR – John Kasay 28-yard field goal, Buccaneers 21–13, Drive: 6 plays, 69 yards, 2:19.
- CAR – John Kasay 48-yard field goal, Buccaneers 21–16, Drive: 4 plays, 3 yards, 1:36.

Fourth quarter

- TB – Connor Barth 32-yard field goal, Buccaneers 24–16, Drive: 10 plays, 66 yards, 6:00.
- TB – Cadillac Williams 45-yard run (Connor Barth kick), Buccaneers 31–16, Drive: 7 plays, 66 yards, 3:58.

Top passers

- CAR – Jimmy Clausen – 16/29, 191 yards
- TB – Josh Freeman – 18/24, 241 yards, 2 touchdowns

Top rushers

- CAR – Mike Goodson – 23 rushes, 100 yards
- TB – LeGarrette Blount – 19 rushes, 91 yards, 1 touchdown

Top receivers

- CAR – Steve Smith – 3 receptions, 47 yards
- TB – Mike Williams – 4 receptions, 68 yards

Top tacklers

- CAR – Nic Harris – 7 tackles, 3 assists
- TB – Barrett Ruud – 7 tackles, 3 assists, 1.0 sack

Trying to break a two-game losing streak the Panthers flew to Raymond James Stadium for an NFC South rivalry match against the Buccaneers. In the first quarter the Panthers trailed early as quarterback Josh Freeman made an 8-yard touchdown pass to wide receiver Arrelious Benn. They narrowed the lead with kicker John Kasay hitting a 46-yard field goal. They struggled further in the second quarter with running back LeGarrette Blount getting a 17-yard touchdown run; but they replied with running back Josh Vaughan making a 2-yard touchdown run. Tampa Bay scored again when Freeman found tight end Kellen Winslow on a 20-yard touchdown pass. The Panthers tried to cut the lead down with Kasay's 28- and 48-yard field goals, but the Buccaneers pulled away in the fourth quarter with kicker Connor Barth nailing a 32-yard field goal, and with running back Cadillac Williams getting a 45-yard touchdown run.

With the loss, the Panthers fell to 1–8, and were swept by the Buccaneers for the first time since 2002.

=== Week 11: vs. Baltimore Ravens ===
Week 11: Baltimore Ravens at Carolina Panthers – Game summary

Quarter	1	2	3	4	Total
Ravens	10	7	3	17	37
Panthers	0	3	3	7	13

at Bank of America Stadium, Charlotte, North Carolina

- Date: November 21
- Game time: 1:00 p.m. EST
- Game weather: 65 °F (18.3 °C) (Sunny)
- Game attendance: 73,021
- Referee: Alberto Riveron
- TV announcers (CBS): Kevin Harlan and Solomon Wilcots
- Recap

Game information

First quarter

- BAL – T. J. Houshmandzadeh 56-yard pass from Joe Flacco (Billy Cundiff kick), Ravens 7–0, Drive: 2 plays, 50 yards, 0:33.
- BAL – Billy Cundiff 22-yard field goal, Ravens 10–0, Drive: 13 plays, 84 yards, 7:18.

Second quarter

- CAR – John Kasay 45-yard field goal, Ravens 10–3, Drive: 6 plays, 53 yards, 2:36.
- BAL – Ray Rice 1-yard run (Billy Cundiff kick), Ravens 17–3, Drive: 8 plays, 51 yards, 3:27.

Third quarter

- BAL – Billy Cundiff 33-yard field goal, Ravens 20–3, Drive: 4 plays, 3 yards, 1:02.
- CAR – John Kasay 40-yard field goal, Ravens 20–6, Drive: 5 plays, 3 yards, 2:09.

Fourth quarter

- CAR – David Gettis 88-yard pass from Brian St. Pierre (John Kasay kick), Ravens 20–13, Drive: 3 plays, 86 yards, 0:29.
- BAL – Billy Cundiff 49-yard field goal, Ravens 23–13, Drive: 7 plays, 48 yards, 3:45.
- BAL – Dawan Landry 23-yard lateral pass from Ed Reed interception return (Billy Cundiff kick), Ravens 30–13.
- BAL – Ray Lewis 24-yard interception return (Billy Cundiff kick), Ravens 37–13.

Top passers

- BAL – Joe Flacco – 24/33, 301 yards, 1 touchdown
- CAR – Brian St. Pierre – 13/28, 173 yards, 1 touchdown, 2 interceptions

Top rushers

- BAL – Ray Rice – 19 rushes, 65 yards, 1 touchdown
- CAR – Mike Goodson – 22 rushes, 120 yards

Top receivers

- BAL – T. J. Houshmandzadeh – 2 receptions, 79 yards, 1 touchdown
- CAR – David Gettis – 2 receptions, 92 yards, 1 touchdown

Top tacklers

- BAL – Ray Lewis – 8 tackles, 2 assists, 1 interception
- CAR – Charles Godfrey – 7 tackles, 1 forced fumble

Hoping to break their losing streak the Panthers played on home ground for an inter-conference duel with the Ravens. In the first quarter the Panthers trailed early with quarterback Joe Flacco getting a 56-yard touchdown pass to wide receiver T. J. Houshmandzadeh. This was followed by kicker Billy Cundiff nailing a 22-yard field goal. The Panthers replied with kicker John Kasay making a 45-yard field goal, but they struggled further with running back Ray Rice getting a 1-yard touchdown run, followed by Cundiff hitting a 33-yard field goal in the third quarter. The Panthers tried to cut the lead when Kasay made a 40-yard field goal. This was followed by quarterback Brian St. Pierre completing an 88-yard touchdown pass to wide receiver David Gettis. The Ravens answered back with Cundiff hitting a 49-yard field goal. The Panthers had further problems with both St. Pierre's passes intercepted by Ed Reed (who later threw a lateral to Dawan Landry), and Ray Lewis, in which both of them were returned for a touchdown 23 and 24 yards respectively.

With the loss, Carolina fell to 1–9, and was officially eliminated from playoff contention. Additionally, wins from the rest of their division rivals mathematically ensured that Carolina would be locked in a season-ending 4th-place finish in the NFC South division.

=== Week 12: at Cleveland Browns ===
Week 12: Carolina Panthers at Cleveland Browns – Game summary

Quarter	1	2	3	4	Total
Panthers	7	6	7	3	23
Browns	14	7	0	3	24

at Cleveland Browns Stadium, Cleveland, Ohio

- Date: November 28
- Game time: 1:00 p.m. EST
- Game weather: 39 °F (3.9 °C) (Sunny)
- Game attendance: 64,463
- Referee: Jeff Triplette
- TV announcers (Fox): Chris Rose and Torry Holt
- Recap

Game information

First quarter

- CAR – (10:36) Mike Goodson 26-yard run (John Kasay kick), Panthers 7–0, Drive: 9 plays, 81 yards, 4:24.
- CLE – (6:49) Peyton Hillis 9-yard run (Phil Dawson kick), Tied 7–7, Drive: 9 plays, 77 yards, 3:47.
- CLE – (2:44) Peyton Hillis 5-yard run (Phil Dawson kick), Browns 14–7, Drive: 7 plays, 64 yards, 3:04.

Second quarter

- CLE – (9:12) Peyton Hillis 6-yard run (Phil Dawson kick), Browns 21–7, Drive: 6 plays, 60 yards, 2:13.
- CAR – (3:19) John Kasay 43-yard field goal, Browns 21–10, Drive: 10 plays, 49 yards, 5:53.
- CAR – (0:47) John Kasay 42-yard field goal, Browns 21–13, Drive: 5 plays, 18 yards, 0:59.

Third quarter

- CAR – (12:18) Captain Munnerlyn 37-yard interception return (John Kasay kick), Browns 21–20.

Fourth quarter

- CAR – (7:01) John Kasay 43-yard field goal, Panthers 23–21, Drive: 9 plays, 51 yards, 4:32.
- CLE – (2:42) Phil Dawson 41-yard field goal, Browns 24–23, Drive: 9 plays, 46 yards, 4:19.

Top passers

- CAR – Jimmy Clausen – 16/28, 195 yards, 1 interception
- CLE – Jake Delhomme – 24/35, 245 yards, 2 interceptions

Top rushers

- CAR – Jonathan Stewart – 12 rushes, 98 yards
- CLE – Peyton Hillis – 26 rushes, 131 yards, 3 touchdowns

Top receveivers

- CAR – Mike Goodson – 8 receptions, 81 yards
- CLE – Peyton Hillis – 6 receptions, 63 yards

Top tacklers

- CAR – James Anderson – 9 tackles, 1 assist
- CLE – Sheldon Brown – 8 tackles, 2 assists

The Panthers' eleventh game was an interconference duel with the Browns at Cleveland Browns Stadium. In the first quarter the Panthers took the lead as running back Mike Goodson got a 26-yard touchdown run. They trailed after running back Peyton Hillis got a 9, 5 and then a 6-yard touchdown run in the second quarter. The lead was narrowed when kicker John Kasay made field goals from 43 and 42 yards. This was followed by cornerback Captain Munnerlyn returning an interception 37 yards for a touchdown. The Panthers got the lead when Kasay hit a 43-yard field goal. They slightly trailed after kicker Phil Dawson hit a 41-yard field goal. The Panthers' hopes for a win got denied as Kasay missed a 42-yard field goal with the time expiring.

With the close loss, the Panthers fell to 1–10.

=== Week 13: at Seattle Seahawks ===
Week 13: Carolina Panthers at Seattle Seahawks – Game summary

Quarter	1	2	3	4	Total
Panthers	7	7	0	0	14
Seahawks	0	3	21	7	31

at Qwest Field, Seattle, Washington

- Date: December 5
- Game time: 4:15 p.m. EST
- Game weather: 45 °F (7.2 °C) (Cloudy)
- Game attendance: 66,577
- Referee: Gene Steratore
- TV announcers (Fox): Chris Rose and Ross Tucker
- Recap

Game information

First quarter

- CAR – Mike Goodson 6-yard run (John Kasay kick), Panthers 7–0, Drive: 10 plays, 61 yards, 4:09.

Second quarter

- CAR – Jonathan Stewart 3-yard run (John Kasay kick), Panthers 14–0, Drive: 10 plays, 79 yards, 5:00.
- SEA – Olindo Mare 24-yard field goal, Panthers 14–3, Drive: 10 plays, 74 yards, 2:36.

Third quarter

- SEA – Marshawn Lynch 1-yard run (Olindo Mare kick), Seahawks 14–10, Drive: 9 plays, 96 yards, 4:14.
- SEA – Lofa Tatupu 26-yard interception return (Olindo Mare kick), Seahawks 17–14.
- SEA – Marshawn Lynch 1-yard run (Olindo Mare kick), Seahawks 24–14, Drive: 2 plays, 2 yards, 0:41.

Fourth quarter

- SEA – Marshawn Lynch 22-yard run (Olindo Mare kick), Seahawks 31–14, Drive: 9 plays, 81 yards, 4:24.

Top passers

- CAR – Jimmy Clausen – 18/34, 169 yards, 1 interception
- SEA – Matt Hasselbeck – 17/30, 229 yards, 2 interceptions

Top rushers

- CAR – Jonathan Stewart – 21 rushes, 92 yards, 1 touchdown
- SEA – Marshawn Lynch – 21 rushes, 83 yards, 3 touchdowns

Top receivers

- CAR – Steve Smith – 3 receptions, 54 yards
- SEA – Cameron Morrah – 3 receptions, 69 yards

Top tacklers

- CAR – Captain Munnerlyn – 6 tackles, 1 assist, 1 interception
- SEA – David Hawthorne – 11 tackles, 3 assists

The Panthers' twelfth game was an NFC duel with the Seahawks at Qwest Field. They took the early lead after running back Mike Goodson got a 6-yard touchdown run, followed by running back Jonathan Stewart getting a 3-yard touchdown run. They failed to maintain this lead after kicker Olindo Mare made a 24-yard field goal, followed by Marshawn Lynch getting a 1-yard touchdown run, then with middle linebacker Lofa Tatupu returning an interception 26 yards for a touchdown. This was followed by Lynch getting a 1 and a 22-yard touchdown run.

With the loss, the Panthers fell to 1–11.

=== Week 14: vs. Atlanta Falcons ===
Week 14: Atlanta Falcons at Carolina Panthers – Game summary

Quarter	1	2	3	4	Total
Falcons	14	3	7	7	31
Panthers	0	0	7	3	10

at Bank of America Stadium, Charlotte, North Carolina

- Date: December 12
- Game time: 1:00 p.m. EST
- Game weather: 44 °F (6.7 °C) (Cloudy)
- Game attendance: 71,235
- Referee: Clete Blakeman
- TV announcers (Fox): Ron Pitts and John Lynch
- Recap

Game information

First quarter

- ATL – Tony Gonzalez 4-yard pass from Matt Ryan (Matt Bryant kick), Falcons 7–0, Drive: 3 plays, 29 yards, 1:03.
- ATL – Michael Turner 1-yard run (Matt Bryant kick), Falcons 14–0, Drive: 8 plays, 73 yards, 4:40.

Second quarter

- ATL – Matt Bryant 39-yard field goal, Falcons 17–0, Drive: 18 plays, 64 yards, 8:48.

Third quarter

- CAR – Mike Goodson 13-yard run (John Kasay kick), Falcons 17–7, Drive: 5 plays, 81 yards, 2:21.
- ATL – Michael Turner 3-yard run (Matt Bryant kick), Falcons 24–7, Drive: 5 plays, 49 yards, 1:37.

Fourth quarter

- CAR – John Kasay 36-yard field goal, Falcons 24–10, Drive: 7 plays, 52 yards, 3:01.
- ATL – Michael Turner 4-yard run (Matt Bryant kick), Falcons 31–10, Drive: 4 plays, 16 yards, 1:52.

Top passers

- ATL – Matt Ryan – 20/34, 227 yards, 1 touchdown, 1 interception
- CAR – Jimmy Clausen – 14/24, 107 yards, 1 interception

Top rushers

- ATL – Michael Turner – 28 rushes, 112 yards, 3 touchdowns
- CAR – Jonathan Stewart – 18 rushes, 133 yards

Top receivers

- ATL – Roddy White – 8 receptions, 79 yards
- CAR – Brandon LaFell – 6 receptions, 38 yards

Top tacklers

- ATL – Thomas DeCoud – 6 tackles, 3 assists
- CAR – Jon Beason – 8 tackles

The Panthers' thirteenth game was an NFC South rivalry match against the Falcons. The Panthers trailed early as quarterback Matt Ryan completed a 4-yard touchdown pass to tight end Tony Gonzalez, followed by running back Michael Turner getting a 1-yard touchdown run, and then with kicker Matt Bryant nailing a 39-yard field goal. The Panthers scored in the third quarter with running back Mike Goodson getting a 13-yard touchdown run, but the Falcons replied as Turner got a 3-yard touchdown run. The Panthers cut the lead as kicker John Kasay made a 36-yard field goal, but fell further behind as Turner got a 4-yard touchdown run.

With the loss, Carolina fell to 1–12.

=== Week 15: vs. Arizona Cardinals ===
Week 15: Arizona Cardinals at Carolina Panthers – Game summary

Quarter	1	2	3	4	Total
Cardinals	0	3	0	9	12
Panthers	6	7	6	0	19

at Bank of America Stadium, Charlotte, North Carolina

- Date: December 19
- Game time: 1:00 p.m. EST
- Game weather: 42 °F (5.6 °C) (Sunny)
- Game attendance: 71,849
- Referee: Tony Corrente
- TV announcers (Fox): Ron Pitts, John Lynch and Nischelle Turner
- Recap

Game information

First quarter

- CAR – John Kasay 28-yard field goal, Panthers 3–0, Drive: 6 plays, 57 yards, 2:27.
- CAR – John Kasay 29-yard field goal, Panthers 6–0, Drive: 14 plays, 80 yards, 6:42.

Second quarter

- CAR – Jeff King 16-yard pass from Jimmy Clausen (John Kasay kick), Panthers 13–0, Drive: 1 plays, 16 yards, 0:07.
- ARI – Jay Feely 23-yard field goal, Panthers 13–3, Drive: 12 plays, 46 yards, 4:19.

Third quarter

- CAR – John Kasay 24-yard field goal, Panthers 16–3, Drive: 6 plays, 31 yards, 2:48.
- CAR – John Kasay 43-yard field goal, Panthers 19–3, Drive: 10 plays, 21 yards, 6:29.

Fourth quarter

- ARI – Steve Breaston fumble recovery in end zone (run failed), Panthers 19–9, Drive: 7 plays, 74 yards, 2:12.
- ARI – Jay Feely 30-yard field goal, Panthers 19–12, Drive: 6 plays, 60 yards, 0:55.

Top passers

- ARI – John Skelton – 17/33, 196 yards, 1 interception
- CAR – Jimmy Clausen – 13/19, 141 yards, 1 touchdown

Top rushers

- ARI – Tim Hightower – 6 rushes, 16 yards
- CAR – Jonathan Stewart – 27 rushes, 137 yards

Top receivers

- ARI – Larry Fitzgerald – 9 receptions, 125 yards
- CAR – Brandon LaFell – 3 receptions, 33 yards

Top tacklers

- ARI – Calais Campbell – 9 tackles, 2 assists, 1.0 sack
- CAR – Captain Munnerlyn – 7 tackles

The Panthers' fourteenth game was an NFC duel with the Cardinals at home. In the first quarter the Panthers took the lead as kicker John Kasay hit a 28 and a 29-yard field goal. This was followed in the second quarter by quarterback Jimmy Clausen completing a 16-yard touchdown pass to tight end Jeff King. The Cardinals answered back with kicker Jay Feely nailing a 23-yard field goal, but the Panthers increased their lead after Kasay made a 24 and a 43-yard field goal. The lead was narrowed with Steve Breaston recovering a fumble in the end zone for a touchdown (with a failed two-point conversion) and then with Feely getting a 30-yard field goal. The Panthers' defense and Jonathan Stewart's 137 yards rushing were enough to secure the win.

With the win, Carolina improved to 2–12. It would be John Fox's last home victory as the Panthers head coach.

=== Week 16: at Pittsburgh Steelers ===
Week 16: Carolina Panthers at Pittsburgh Steelers – Game summary

Quarter	1	2	3	4	Total
Panthers	0	0	0	3	3
Steelers	3	17	7	0	27

at Heinz Field, Pittsburgh, Pennsylvania

- Date: December 23
- Game time: 8:20 p.m. EST
- Game weather: 27 °F (−2.8 °C) (Cloudy)
- Game attendance: 61,748
- Referee: Bill Leavy
- TV announcers (NFLN): Bob Papa, Matt Millen and Joe Theismann
- Recap

Game information

First quarter

- PIT – Shaun Suisham 26-yard field goal, PIT 3–0, Drive: 8 plays, 72 yards, 4:09.

Second quarter

- PIT – Mike Wallace 43-yard pass from Ben Roethlisberger (Shaun Suisham kick), PIT 10–0, Drive: 3 plays, 58 yards, 1:29.
- PIT – Rashard Mendenhall 1-yard run (Shaun Suisham kick), PIT 17–0, Drive: 8 plays, 72 yards, 4:42.
- PIT – Shaun Suisham 29-yard field goal, PIT 20–0, Drive: 6 plays, 47 yards, 0:47.

Third quarter

- PIT – Ben Roethlisberger 1-yard run (Shaun Suisham kick), PIT 27–0, Drive: 7 plays, 35 yards, 3:43.

Fourth quarter

- CAR – John Kasay 27-yard field goal, PIT 27–3, Drive: 6 plays, 14 yards, 2:46.

Top passers

- CAR – Jimmy Clausen – 10/23, 72 yards, 3 interceptions
- PIT – Ben Roethlisberger – 22/32, 320 yards, 1 touchdown

Top rushers

- CAR – Jonathan Stewart – 18 rushes, 71 yards
- PIT – Rashard Mendenhall – 18 rushes, 65 yards, 1 touchdown

Top receivers

- CAR – Mike Goodson – 2 receptions, 23 yards
- PIT – Mike Wallace – 4 receptions, 104 yards, 1 touchdown

Top tacklers

- CAR – Richard Marshall (9)
- PIT – Ryan Mundy (8)

Coming off their win over the Cardinals, the Panthers flew to Heinz Field for a Week 16 interconference duel with the Pittsburgh Steelers on Thursday night. Carolina trailed in the first quarter as Steelers kicker Shaun Suisham got a 26-yard field goal. The Panthers continued to struggle in the second quarter as quarterback Ben Roethlisberger completed a 43-yard touchdown pass to wide receiver Mike Wallace, followed by running back Rashard Mendenhall getting a 1-yard touchdown run and Suisham making a 29-yard field goal.

Pittsburgh continued to increase their lead in the third quarter with Roethlisberger getting a 1-yard touchdown run. Carolina would close out the game in the fourth quarter with a 27-yard field goal from kicker John Kasay.

With the loss, the Panthers fell to 2–13, and became the first NFC South team to ever lose to all of their AFC North opponents.

=== Week 17: at Atlanta Falcons ===
Week 17: Carolina Panthers at Atlanta Falcons – Game summary

Quarter	1	2	3	4	Total
Panthers	0	0	3	7	10
Falcons	14	7	10	0	31

at Georgia Dome, Atlanta, Georgia

- Date: January 2
- Game time: 1:00 p.m. EST
- Referee: John Parry
- TV announcers (Fox): Dick Stockton and Charles Davis

Game information

First quarter

Second quarter

Third quarter

Fourth quarter

Top passers

- CAR –
- ATL –

Top rushers

- CAR –
- ATL –

Top receivers

- CAR –
- ATL –

Top tacklers

- CAR –
- ATL –

The Panthers' final game was a division rivalry rematch against the Falcons. The Panthers trailed early as quarterback Matt Ryan got a 6-yard touchdown pass to tight end Tony Gonzalez. Their problems continued after a three-and-out converted into a 55-yard punt return for a touchdown by Eric Weems; followed by Ryan completing a 14-yard touchdown pass to wide receiver Roddy White. The Panthers tried to cut the lead with kicker John Kasay getting a 23-yard field goal, but they struggled further as kicker Matt Bryant made a 47-yard field goal, followed by running back Michael Turner getting a 3-yard touchdown run. The Panthers tried to come back but only came away with a touchdown as quarterback Jimmy Clausen connected to tight end Jeff King on a 2-yard pass.

With the loss, the Panthers were swept by the Falcons for the first time since 2004, and finished their season on a 2–14 record – the second worst in the history of the franchise (until 2023), and the worst record of any NFL team for the 2010 season.
