= Brandon LaFell =

American football player (born 1986)

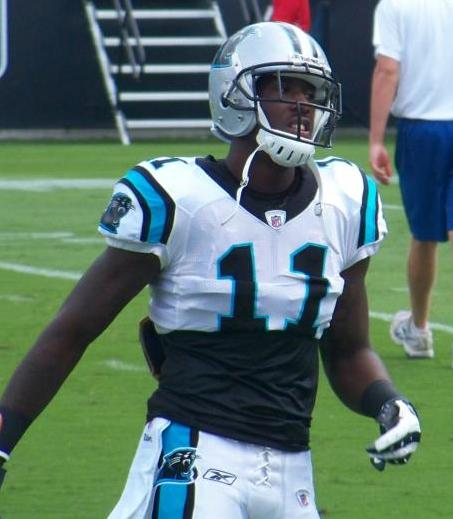
- LaFell with the Carolina Panthers in 2011

No. 11, 19
- Position: Wide receiver

Personal information
- Born: November 4, 1986 (age 40); Houston, Texas, U.S.
- Listed height: 6 ft 3 in (1.91 m)
- Listed weight: 210 lb (95 kg)

Career information
- High school: Lamar (Houston)
- College: LSU (2005–2009)
- NFL draft: 2010: 3rd round, 78th overall pick

Career history
- Carolina Panthers (2010–2013); New England Patriots (2014–2015); Cincinnati Bengals (2016–2017); Oakland Raiders (2018)

Awards and highlights
- Super Bowl champion (XLIX); BCS national champion (2007); First-team All-SEC (2008); Second-team All-SEC (2009)

Career NFL statistics
- Receptions: 406
- Receiving yards: 5,398
- Receiving touchdowns: 31
- Stats at Pro Football Reference

Brandon Josiah LaFell (born November 4, 1986) is an American former professional football player who was a wide receiver in the National Football League (NFL). He played college football for the LSU Tigers. He was selected by the Carolina Panthers in the third round of the 2010 NFL draft, and has also played for the New England Patriots, where he was a member of the Super Bowl XLIX winning team, the Cincinnati Bengals, and the Oakland Raiders.

== Early life ==
LaFell attended Lamar High School in Houston, where he played football, basketball, and ran track. He was coached by Tom Nolen. In football, LaFell caught 46 passes for 1,116 yards and 16 touchdowns as a senior. Also starring on special teams, he returned punts of 65 and 58 yards for touchdowns. LaFell was a member of the Houston Chronicle Top 100 and named first-team All-Greater Houston Area in 2004. In basketball, LaFell was a standout point guard. In track and field, LaFell competed in the high jump event.

== College career ==
After redshirting his initial year at LSU, LaFell saw action in 11 of the Tigers’ 13 games in 2006. His first career play was a 58-yard touchdown reception against Louisiana-Lafayette in week one. On the year, LaFell caught five passes that went for 140 yards and two touchdowns. He received Freshman All-SEC honors by the coaches.

In 2007, as a sophomore, LaFell played in all 14 games with nine starts. He ranked first on team in receiving yards (656) and second in receptions (50), while catching four touchdown passes and averaging 13.1 yards a reception. LaFell helped LSU to win the BCS National Championship that year.

As a junior, LaFell emerged as one of the top receivers in the country, as he caught 63 passes for 929 yards and eight touchdowns. He ranked second in the SEC in yards per game with 71.5 per contest and was third in the league with 4.8 receptions per contest. LaFell subsequently earned First-team All-SEC honors by the Associated Press.

== Professional career ==
Pre-draft measurables
Height	Weight	Arm length	Hand span	40-yard dash	10-yard split	20-yard split	20-yard shuttle	Three-cone drill	Vertical jump	Broad jump	Bench press
6 ft 2 1/2 in (1.89 m)	211 lb (96 kg)	32 3/4 in (0.83 m)	8 3/4 in (0.22 m)	4.54 s	1.58 s	2.60 s	4.23 s	6.81 s	36.0 in (0.91 m)	9 ft 7 in (2.92 m)	11 reps
All values from NFL Combine/Pro Day

LaFell was considered one of the best wide receivers in his draft class, and drew comparisons to Dwayne Bowe, another wide receiver out of LSU.

=== Carolina Panthers ===
On April 23, 2010, LaFell was selected by the Carolina Panthers in the third round, 78th overall. Despite not starting over Steve Smith and David Gettis, he gradually gained playing time, eventually taking the #3 slot at receiver. He recorded his first NFL touchdown in Week 8 against the St. Louis Rams, a 17-yard pass from Matt Moore.

He finished the season with 38 catches for 468 yards; his longest catch was of 44 yards. He also gained 60 additional yards on the ground, all of which came on a single end-around play in Week 17 against the Atlanta Falcons, his longest gain of the season.

LaFell set a Carolina Panthers franchise record on Christmas Eve in 2011 with a 91-yard touchdown catch from rookie quarterback Cam Newton. It was the longest pass play in Panther history.

=== New England Patriots ===
On March 15, 2014, LaFell signed a three-year, $9 million contract with the New England Patriots. He chose to wear #19 because friend and former teammate Ted Ginn Jr. wears the same number. Against the Chicago Bears in Week 8, LaFell recorded a career-high eleven catches for 124 yards and a touchdown. In 2014, LaFell had his most prolific season, recording 74 catches for 953 yards and 7 touchdowns. LaFell helped the Patriots finish 12–4. In the divisional round against the Baltimore Ravens, with the Patriots down 31–28, LaFell caught the game-winning touchdown to help the Patriots defeat the Ravens 35–31. In Super Bowl XLIX, LaFell had 4 catches for 29 yards and the first touchdown of the game as the Patriots defeated the Seattle Seahawks 28–24.

LaFell started the 2015 season on PUP with a foot injury and missed the first five games of the season before returning in New England's 30–23 win over the New York Jets. LaFell struggled throughout the 2015 season with multiple drops and failed to live up to his career performance the previous year.

On March 2, 2016, LaFell was released by the Patriots.

=== Cincinnati Bengals ===
On March 30, 2016, LaFell signed with the Cincinnati Bengals.

On September 11, 2016, LaFell made his Bengals debut in a 23–22 victory over the New York Jets. He had four receptions for 91 yards. He played 16 games in 2016, starting 14 of them as the Bengals went 6–9–1 and missed the playoffs. He finished the season with 64 receptions for 862 yards and six touchdowns.

On March 8, 2017, LaFell signed a two-year contract extension with the Bengals.

On September 10, 2017, LaFell began the 2017 season with three receptions for 24 yards in a 20–0 loss to the Baltimore Ravens. He finished the season with 52 receptions for 548 yards and three touchdowns.

On August 2, 2018, Lafell was released by the Bengals.

=== Oakland Raiders ===
On September 3, 2018, LaFell signed with the Oakland Raiders. He played in six games, recording 12 catches for 135 yards and two touchdowns, before suffering a torn Achilles in Week 11. He was placed on injured reserve on November 19, 2018.

== NFL career statistics ==
Year	Team	Games		Receiving						Rushing					Fumbles	
Year	Team	GP	GS	Rec	Tgt	Yds	Avg	Lng	TD	Att	Yds	Avg	Lng	TD	Fum	Lost
2010	CAR	14	2	38	75	468	12.3	44	1	1	60	60.0	60	0	0	0
2011	CAR	16	6	36	56	613	17.0	91	3	—	—	—	—	—	0	0
2012	CAR	14	12	44	76	677	15.4	62	4	3	35	11.7	25	0	1	0
2013	CAR	16	16	49	88	627	12.8	79	5	2	15	7.5	9	0	1	0
2014	NE	16	13	74	119	953	12.9	56	7	2	13	6.5	0	0	1	1
2015	NE	11	7	37	74	515	13.9	54	0	2	9	4.5	9	0	0	0
2016	CIN	16	14	64	106	862	13.5	86	6	1	-2	-2.0	-2	0	0	0
2017	CIN	16	15	52	88	548	10.5	45	3	—	—	—	—	—	1	0
2018	OAK	6	5	12	16	135	11.3	24	2	—	—	—	—	—	0	0
Total		125	90	406	704	5,398	13.3	91	31	11	130	11.8	60	0	4	1
