= Trento (disambiguation) =

Trento is an Italian city.

Trento may also refer to:

== Places ==
- Province of Trento, an Italian province
- Trento, Agusan del Sur, a municipality in the Philippines
- Trento-class cruiser, an Italian heavy cruiser

== Other uses ==
- Denis Trento (born 1982), Italian ski mountaineer
- Michael Trento, American politician
- University of Trento, Italy
- Trento DOC, an appellation for white and rosé sparkling wine made in Trentino, Italy

== See also ==
- Trent (disambiguation)
