= John Trent =

John Trent may refer to:

- John Trent (author), American author of marriage and family books
- John Trent (director) (1935–1983), British-born Canadian film director
- John Trent (actor) (1906–1966), American aviator and actor
