= Trenton (given name) =

Trenton is a masculine given name. People with the name include:

- Trent Ashby (born 1972), American politician
- Trenton Cannon (born 1994), American football player
- Trenton Clarke, American drag performer
- Trenton Cowles (born 2002), American archer
- Trenton Estep (born 1999), American racing driver
- Trenton Gill (born 1999), American football player
- Trent Guy (born 1987), American football player
- Trenton Doyle Hancock (born 1974), American artist
- Trent Harmon (born 1990), American musician, winner of the fifteenth and final season of American Idol
- Trenton Hassell (born 1979), American former National Basketball Association player
- Trenton Irwin (born 1995), American football player
- Trenton Meacham (born 1985), American basketball player
- Trenton Merricks, professor of philosophy
- Trenton Robinson (born 1990), American former National Football League player
- Trent Scott (born 1994), American National Football League player
- Trenton Shipley (born 1973), Australian painter and artist
- Trenton Simpson (born 2001), American football player
- Trenton Lee Stewart (born 1970), American author
- T. J. Jackson (wide receiver) (1943–2007), American National Football League player
- Trent Richardson (born 1990), American football player
- Trent Williams (born 1988), American football player
