= 2009 All-Big East Conference football team =

American college football all-star team

The 2009 All-Big East Conference football team consists of American football players from the Big East Conference who were chosen as the best at their respective positions during the 2009 NCAA Division I FBS football season. The official All-Big East teams in 2009 were chosen by votes of the conference's head football coaches. The coaches chose both first- and second-team players. Pitt running back Dion Lewis was selected as the Big East player of the year and rookie of the year. Two Pitt defenders, Greg Romeus and Mick Williams, tied for the defensive player of the year award. Brian Kelly of Cincinnati was chosen as the Big East coach of the year.

== Offensive selections ==
=== Quarterbacks ===
- Tony Pike, Cincinnati (Coaches-1)
- Bill Stull,Pitt (Coaches-1)
- Jarrett Brown, West Virginia (Coaches-2)

=== Running backs ===
- Dion Lewis, Pitt (Coaches-1)
- Noel Devine, West Virginia (Coaches-1)
- Andre Dixon, UConn (Coaches-2)
- Jordan Todman, UConn (Coaches-2)

=== Wide receivers ===
- Mardy Gilyard, Cincinnati (Coaches-1)
- Jonathan Baldwin, Pitt (Coaches-1)
- Armon Binns, Cincinnati (Coaches-2)
- Tim Brown, Rutgers (Coaches-2)

=== Tight ends ===
- Dorin Dickerson, Pitt (Coaches-1)
- Ben Guidugli, Cincinnati (Coaches-2)
- Nate Byham, Pitt (Coaches-2)

=== Offensive tackles ===
- Jason Pinkston, Pitt (Coaches-1)
- Anthony Davis, Rutgers (Coaches-1)
- Jeff Linkenbach, Cincinnati (Coaches-2)
- Selvish Capers, West Virginia (Coaches-2)

=== Offensive guard ===
- Zach Hurd, UConn (Coaches-1)
- John Malecki, Pitt (Coaches-1)
- Alex Hoffman, Cincinnati (Coaches-2)
- Jason Kelce, Cincinnati (Coaches-2)
- Ryan Bartholomew, Syracuse (Coaches-2)

=== Centers ===
- Chris Jurek, Cincinnati (Coaches-1)
- Sampson Genus, South Florida (Coaches-2)

== Defensive selections ==
=== Defensive line ===
- Lindsey Witten, UConn (Coaches-1)
- Greg Romeus, Pitt (Coaches-1)
- Mick Williams, Pitt (Coaches-1)
- Jason Pierre-Paul, South Florida (Coaches-1)
- Arthur Jones, Syracuse (Coaches-1)
- Ricardo Matthews, Cincinnati (Coaches-2)
- Gus Mustakus, Pitt (Coaches-2)
- George Selvie, South Florida (Coaches-2)
- Chris Neild, West Virginia (Coaches-2)

=== Linebackers ===
- Lawrence Wilson, UConn (Coaches-1)
- Adam Gunn, Pitt (Coaches-1)
- Kion Wilson, South Florida (Coaches-1)
- J. T. Thomas, West Virginia (Coaches-1)
- Greg Lloyd Jr., UConn (Coaches-2)
- Derrell Smith, Syracuse (Coaches-2)
- Reed Williams, West Virginia (Coaches-2)

=== Cornerbacks ===
- Aaron Berry, Pitt (Coaches-1)
- Devin McCourty, Rutgers (Coaches-1)
- Brandon Hogan, West Virginia (Coaches-1)
- Robert McClain, UConn (Coaches-2)
- Jerome Murphy, South Florida (Coaches-2)

=== Safeties ===
- Aaron Webster, Cincinnati (Coaches-1)
- Robert Sands, West Virginia (Coaches-1)
- Dom DeCicco, Pitt (Coaches-2)
- Nate Allen, South Florida (Coaches-2)

== Special teams ==
=== Kickers ===
- Tyler Bitancurt, West Virginia (Coaches-1)
- Dan Hutchins, Pitt (Coaches-2)

=== Punters ===
- Rob Long, Syracuse (Coaches-1)
- Scott Kozlowski, West Virginia (Coaches-2)

=== Return specialist ===
- Mardy Gilyard, Cincinnati (Coaches-1)
- Trent Guy, Louisville (Coaches-2)

== Individual awards ==
- Offensive player of the year - Dion Lewis, running back, Pitt
- Defensive player of the year - Greg Romeus, linebacker, Pitt, and Mick Williams, Pitt
- Special teams player of the year - Mardy Gilyard, Cincinnati
- Rookie of the year - Dion Lewis, Pitt
- Coach of the year - Brian Kelly, Cincinnati
- Honorary captain - Jasper Howard, UConn

== Key ==
Coaches, selected by the conference coaches

== See also ==
- 2009 All-America college football team
