= David Gettis =

American football player (born 1987)

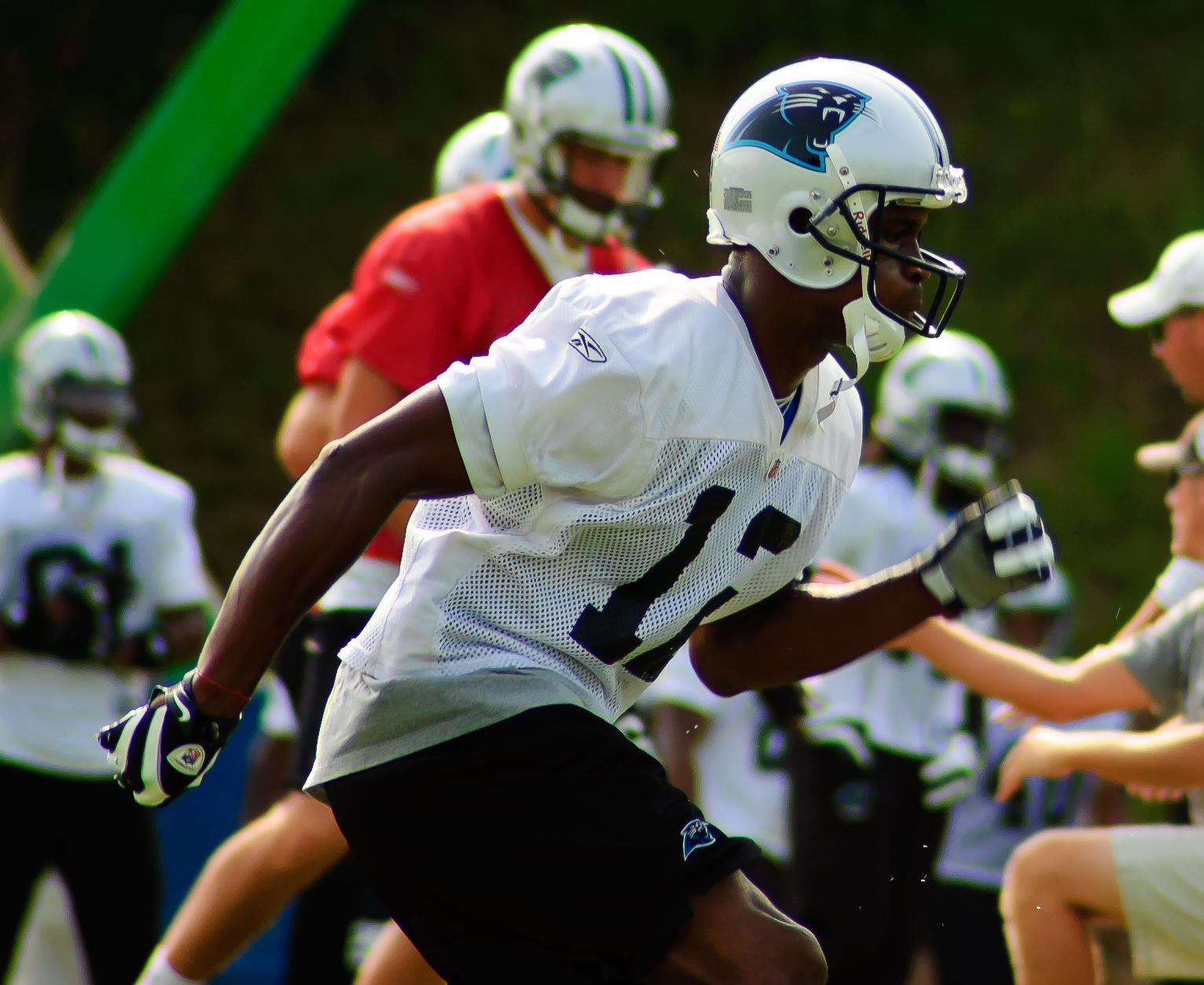
- Gettis with the Carolina Panthers in 2010

No. 12
- Position: Wide receiver

Personal information
- Born: August 27, 1987 (age 39); Cherry Point, North Carolina, U.S.
- Listed height: 6 ft 3 in (1.91 m)
- Listed weight: 220 lb (100 kg)

Career information
- High school: Susan Miller Dorsey (Los Angeles, California)
- College: Baylor (2006–2009)
- NFL draft: 2010: 6th round, 198th overall pick

Career history
- Carolina Panthers (2010–2013); Washington Redskins (2014)*; Tampa Bay Buccaneers (2014)*; Winnipeg Blue Bombers (2015)*
- * Offseason or practice squad member only

Career NFL statistics
- Receptions: 37
- Receiving yards: 508
- Receiving touchdowns: 3
- Stats at Pro Football Reference

David Alexander Gettis (born August 27, 1987) is an American former professional football player who was a wide receiver for the Carolina Panthers of the National Football League (NFL). He played college football for the Baylor Bears and was selected by the Panthers in the sixth round of the 2010 NFL draft.

== Early life ==
Gettis was a three-time CIF California State Meet champion (2003, 2004, 2005) in the 400 metres for Susan Miller Dorsey High School in Los Angeles.

== College career ==
Gettis attended Baylor University, where he played football for the Bears.

=== Track and field ===
Gettis was also a standout track athlete in high school. He was the California's first-ever three-time prep state 400 meters champion. He was named 2005 Boys Track & Field Athlete of the Year by the Los Angeles Times. He also anchored Dorsey's victorious 4 × 400 meter relay team, and ran second leg of its gold-medal 4 × 100 meter relay team at the 2005 state meet.

He won the state 400 meters title in 47.1 seconds as a sophomore, then ran in 46.3 seconds to claim his second state 400 meters gold medal and ran a personal-best time of 45.84 seconds to win the 2005 state crown, beating Bryshon Nellum, while his time was at the time a high school state record.

His personal bests are 45.84 seconds in the 400 meters and 20.60 seconds in the 200 meters.

==== Personal bests ====
Event	Time (seconds)	Venue	Date
200 meters	6.6	Los Angeles, California	May 11, 2005
400 meters	1	Sacramento, California	June 4, 2005

== Professional career ==
Pre-draft measurables
Height	Weight	40-yard dash	10-yard split	20-yard split	20-yard shuttle	Three-cone drill	Vertical jump	Broad jump	Bench press
6 ft 3 in (1.91 m)	217 lb (98 kg)	4.39 s	1.56 s	2.59 s	4.41 s	6.94 s	34.5 in (0.88 m)	10 ft 4 in (3.15 m)	15 reps
All values from NFL Combine.

=== Carolina Panthers ===
==== 2010 season ====
Gettis was selected by the Carolina Panthers in the sixth round (198th overall) of the 2010 NFL draft.

Gettis was first active in week 2 of the 2010 season against the Tampa Bay Buccaneers. He started as the no. 2 receiver, beating out fellow rookie Brandon LaFell, and recorded 18 yards on 2 catches. He had a breakout game in week 7 against San Francisco, recording 8 catches for 125 yards and a season high 2 touchdown catches in a 23–20 Panthers victory. Gettis was nominated for the Pepsi NFL Rookie of the Week for his efforts. At the time, 125 receiving yards was a Panthers single-game rookie record. It has since been surpassed by D. J. Moore, while Gettis's single-game rookie record of 2 receiving touchdowns was tied by Kelvin Benjamin.

Gettis continued as starter for the rest of the season, excluding the week 12 and 13 matchups against Cleveland and Seattle. He finished the season with a team-high 3 touchdown catches, as well as 508 receiving yards on 37 catches, which ranked as second and third on the team, respectively. He also returned 8 kickoffs for 145 yards, and recorded an 88-yard touchdown reception against Baltimore in week 11 – the second longest touchdown reception in Panthers history.

==== 2011 season ====
Gettis injured his left knee in practice in August 2011. After an MRI showed a torn ACL, he was declared out for the entire season and placed on the injured reserve on August 30.

==== 2012 season ====
Gettis came back from his injury and played in 2 games but did not record a reception.

==== 2013 season ====
Gettis was released with an injury settlement on August 31, 2013.

=== Washington Redskins ===
Gettis was signed by the Washington Redskins to a reserve/future contract on January 7, 2014. He was released on May 12.

=== Tampa Bay Buccaneers ===
On June 17, 2014, Gettis was signed by the Tampa Bay Buccaneers. He was waived on August 4, 2014.

=== Winnipeg Blue Bombers ===
On May 27, 2015, David Gettis was signed by the Winnipeg Blue Bombers. He was waived on Saturday, May 30, 2015.

=== Career statistics ===
Regular Season				Receiving					Rushing					Kick Return				
Year	Team	GP	GS	Rec	Yds	Avg	Lng	TD	Att	Yds	Avg	Lng	TD	Ret	Yds	Avg	Lng	TD
2010	Carolina Panthers	15	13	37	508	13.7	88T	3	3	2	0.7	19	0	9	159	17.7	28	0
2011	Carolina Panthers	0	0	--	--	--	--	--	--	--	--	--	--	--	--	--	--	--
2012	Carolina Panthers	2	0	--	--	--	--	--	--	--	--	--	--	--	--	--	--	--
Totals		17	13	37	508	13.7	88	3	3	2	0.7	19	0	9	159	17.7	28	0

== Coaching career ==
Gettis returned to Baylor university in 2015 to complete his undergraduate degree. During this time, he was a student-coach for the Baylor Bears. The following year in 2016, he worked as a graduate assistant on Coach Jim Grobe’s staff. He was then hired as wide receivers coach at the University of Texas Permian Basin in 2017.

He is currently a quality control coach at Syracuse University.

== Personal life ==
Gettis is the cousin of guard Adam Gettis, who was selected in fifth round of the 2012 NFL draft by the Washington Redskins. The two were briefly teammates during the 2014 offseason.
