= Brian St. Pierre =

American football player and coach (born 1979)

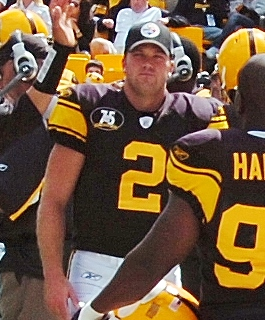
- St. Pierre with the Pittsburgh Steelers in 2007

No. 2, 6
- Position: Quarterback

Personal information
- Born: November 28, 1979 (age 46); Salem, Massachusetts, U.S.
- Listed height: 6 ft 3 in (1.91 m)
- Listed weight: 224 lb (102 kg)

Career information
- High school: St. John's Prep (Danvers, Massachusetts)
- College: Boston College (1998–2002)
- NFL draft: 2003: 5th round, 163rd overall pick

Career history
- Pittsburgh Steelers (2003–2004); Baltimore Ravens (2005); Pittsburgh Steelers (2006–2007); Arizona Cardinals (2008–2009); Carolina Panthers (2010)

Career NFL statistics
- Passing attempts: 33
- Passing completions: 15
- Completion percentage: 45.5%
- TD–INT: 2–3
- Passing yards: 185
- Passer rating: 45.6
- Stats at Pro Football Reference

Brian Fuller St. Pierre (born November 28, 1979) is an American former professional football player who was a quarterback in the National Football League (NFL). He played college football for the Boston College Eagles. St. Pierre was selected by the Pittsburgh Steelers in the fifth round of the 2003 NFL draft.

St. Pierre spent almost his entire career as a backup. He played in three regular season games in his NFL career: one with the Steelers in 2004, one with the Arizona Cardinals in 2009, and one with the Carolina Panthers in 2010, the latter being his only start. He spent four of his first five seasons with the Steelers, and also had a stint with the Baltimore Ravens in 2005 without seeing any game action.

After his playing career, he became the head coach of his alma mater St. John's Preparatory School in Danvers, Massachusetts.

== Early life ==
St. Pierre was born in Salem, Massachusetts, and attended St. John's Preparatory School in Massachusetts. He broke the school's single season and career records for completions, attempts, touchdown passes, touchdown rushes, completion percentage, and games played. He earned All-America honors from Tom Lemming, PrepStar and SuperPrep magazines. He was also named Massachusetts and New England Gatorade Player of the Year and was selected as USA Today's Massachusetts co-player of the year. He was team captain for the 1997 St. John's team that finished 11–0 and won the Eastern Massachusetts Super Bowl. He was a three-year Catholic Conference all-star in football and a two-time Catholic Conference all-star in baseball. He was also a member of the St. John's basketball team that won the 1997–98 Catholic Conference title.

== College career ==
After spending the 1998 season as a red-shirt, St. Pierre entered the 1999 season as the Boston College Eagles second-string quarterback behind junior Tim Hasselbeck. He made the first start of his career on October 16 against Pittsburgh. He completed nine of fifteen passes for 115 yards and threw the first touchdown pass of his career. He also ran the ball seven times for 62 yards before leaving the game with a concussion.

Due to an injury to Hasselbeck, St. Pierre was the starting quarterback in BC's 2000 season opener against Notre Dame. He completed 15 of 29 passes for 172 yards and two touchdowns in a 28–16 loss to the Fighting Irish. St. Pierre spent the remainder of the season as a backup, however coach Tom O'Brien used him for at least one possession of every game.

St. Pierre became the Eagles' starting quarterback in 2001 and started all 12 games. He completed 149 of 279 passes for 2,233 yards, 25 touchdowns, and 10 interceptions. He was the co-winner of the 2001 Scanlan Award, an award given by the Boston College Varsity Club Award to the senior football player outstanding in scholarship, leadership, and athletic ability. BC finished the year with a 7–4 record and defeated Georgia 20–16 in the Music City Bowl.

During the 2002 regular season, he completed 237 of 407 passes for 2,983 yards, 18 touchdowns, and 17 interceptions. St. Pierre went 25-of-35 for 342 yards, three touchdowns and no interceptions in the final game of his collegiate career, a 51–26 win over Toledo in the 2002 Motor City Bowl. St. Pierre finished his college career third on the all-time Boston College passing list with 5,837 yards and third on the all-time touchdowns list with 48 career TDs.

== Professional career ==
Pre-draft measurables
Height	Weight	Arm length	Hand span	40-yard dash	10-yard split	20-yard split	Vertical jump	Broad jump	Wonderlic
6 ft 2 3/4 in (1.90 m)	218 lb (99 kg)	29 1/4 in (0.74 m)	9 1/4 in (0.23 m)	4.82 s	1.80 s	2.85 s	30 in (0.76 m)	8 ft 10 in (2.69 m)	27
All values from NFL Combine

=== Pittsburgh Steelers (first stint) ===
St. Pierre was selected by the Pittsburgh Steelers in the fifth round of the 2003 NFL draft. He spent his rookie season as the Steelers' third-string quarterback behind Tommy Maddox and Charlie Batch. In 2004, St. Pierre made his first appearance in a regular season game. He came in and ran for a key first-down conversion late in the fourth quarter on a two-yard naked bootleg in the season finale against the Buffalo Bills. He finished the game 0/1 passing and he had 5 carries (4 of which were kneel-downs) for −3 yards.

St. Pierre was allegedly one of the Pittsburgh players impersonated by a con man, Brian Jackson in 2005, along with Jerame Tuman and Ben Roethlisberger.

On September 3, 2005, he was waived by the Steelers.

=== Baltimore Ravens ===
On September 22, 2005, the Ravens signed St. Pierre to their practice squad, activating him on December 8. The Ravens released him as part of their mandatory cuts on September 2, 2006. He never appeared in a game for the Ravens outside of the preseason.

=== Pittsburgh Steelers (second stint) ===
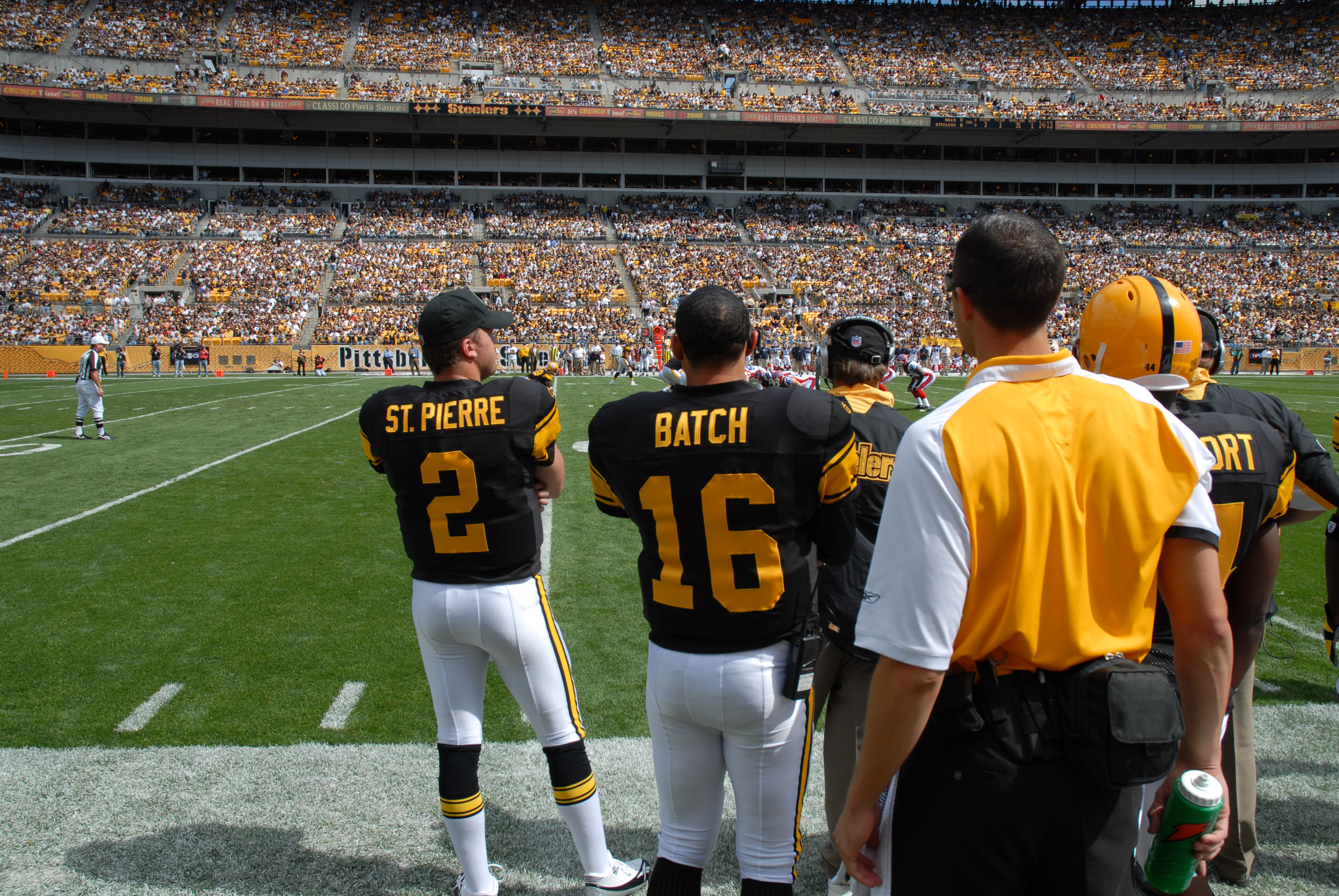
St. Pierre and Charlie Batch on the sideline in 2007

On September 4, 2006, St. Pierre was signed to the Steelers' practice squad. Two days later he was moved to the 53-man roster because starter Ben Roethlisberger would miss time following an appendectomy. He was cut by the Steelers on October 14 and re-signed by the team two days later. He was cut again by the Steelers on November 11 and re-signed with Pittsburgh two days later.

=== Arizona Cardinals ===
On March 27, 2008, St. Pierre signed a one-year contract with the Arizona Cardinals, where he played for former Steelers and Los Angeles Chargers offensive coordinator Ken Whisenhunt.

He was the Cardinals third quarterback for all 16 regular season games and all four postseason contests, including Super Bowl XLIII.

St. Pierre completed his first NFL pass on January 3, 2010, versus the Green Bay Packers. Two plays later, he threw his first interception to Tramon Williams. With three minutes left in the fourth quarter, St. Pierre threw his first career touchdown to Larry Fitzgerald. St. Pierre became a free agent after the 2009 season.

=== Carolina Panthers ===
On November 16, 2010, the Carolina Panthers moved St. Pierre to their active roster just five days after joining their practice squad on November 11. This was in light of rookie quarterback Jimmy Clausen being diagnosed with a concussion after a loss to the Tampa Bay Buccaneers the previous Sunday.

On November 18, 2010, the Panthers declared St. Pierre the starting quarterback for their November 21 game against the Baltimore Ravens, despite the fact that he had only thrown 5 passes in his NFL career. In his first and only start he completed 13 of 28 passes for 173 yards, one touchdown and two interceptions in the 37–13 loss. It ended up being the final game of his career. St. Pierre became a free agent after the 2010 season.

== NFL career statistics ==
=== Regular season ===
Year	Team	Games			Passing								Rushing				Sacks		Fumbles (Note: Fumbles lost data taken from Pro Football Reference career game log)	
Year	Team	GP	GS	Record	Cmp	Att	Pct	Yds	Y/A	TD	Int	Rtg	Att	Yds	Avg	TD	Sck	SckY	Fum	Lost
2003	PIT	0	0	DNP																
2004	PIT	1	0	–	0	1	0.0	0	0.0	0	0	0.0	4	−3	−0.8	0	0	0	0	0
2005	BAL	0	0	DNP																
2006	PIT	0	0	DNP																
2007	PIT	0	0	DNP																
2008	ARI	0	0	DNP																
2009	ARI	1	0	–	2	4	50.0	12	3.0	1	1	56.2	1	2	2.0	0	0	0	1	0
2010	CAR	1	1	0–1	13	28	46.4	173	6.2	1	2	48.7	0	0	0.0	0	3	23	0	0
Career		3	1	0–1	15	33	45.5	185	5.6	2	3	45.6	5	−1	−0.2	0	3	23	1	0

=== Playoffs ===
Year	Team	Games			Passing								Rushing				Sacks		Fumbles	
Year	Team	GP	GS	Record	Cmp	Att	Pct	Yds	Y/A	TD	Int	Rtg	Att	Yds	Avg	TD	Sck	SckY	Fum	Lost
2004	PIT	0	0	DNP																
2007	PIT	0	0	DNP																
2008	ARI	0	0	DNP																
2009	ARI	0	0	DNP																

== Coaching career ==
In 2014, St. Pierre became head football coach at his alma mater, St. John's Preparatory School in Danvers, Massachusetts. He led the Eagles to Division 1 Super Bowl victories in 2018, 2019 and 2022. St. Pierre is also an administrator with the St. John's Office for Institutional Advancement.
