= Gary Smalley =

American family counselor and author (1940–2016)

- Born: Gary Thomas Smalley; September 16, 1940; Boise, Idaho, U.S.
- Died: March 6, 2016 (aged 75); Magnolia, Texas U.S.
- Occupations: Author; Public Speaker; Counselor
- Years active: 1962 – 2016
- Spouse: Norma (1964 – 2016, his death)
- Children: Kari Gibson; Greg Smalley; Michael Smalley
- Website: https://www.smalleyinstitute.com/

Gary Thomas Smalley (September 16, 1940 – March 6, 2016) was an American family counselor, president and founder of the Smalley Relationship Center and author of books on family relationships from a Christian perspective. Among other issues, he taught about the four temperaments in a format based on well known animals, the otter, lion, golden retriever, and beaver.

== Biography ==
In 1979, Gary and Norma Smalley started an organization focused on helping families. After the formation of a board, they launched the CMI organization out of Waco, Texas. A few years later they moved to Phoenix, Arizona. Gary co-authored two books with Steve Scott during that time titled, If Only He Knew and For Better or For Best. In 1985 the organization was renamed Today's Family.

In 1988, Gary partnered with American Telecast's Steve Scott and they launched a nationwide infomercial with Dick Clark as the host of a half-hour television program. That infomercial was re-introduced in 1990 and 1992 through John Tesh and Connie Sellecca and then Frank and Kathie Lee Gifford.

The Blessing and The Two Sides of Love won the Gold Medallion Award for excellence in literature. The Language of Love won the Angel Award as the best contribution to family life.

Gary Smalley appeared on national televisions programs such as "The Oprah Winfrey Show", "Larry King Live", "Extra", "NBC Today Show" as well as numerous national radio programs.

Smalley and his wife, Norma, lived in Branson, Missouri. They have one daughter and two sons. Gary Smalley died on March 6, 2016.

In 2019, Smalley's grandson Michael Gibson published a book with FaithWords called Real Life Love: Saying Goodbye to the Fairytale and Hello to True Relationships based on the insights he gleaned from his famous grandfather.

== Bibliography ==
- The DNA of Relationships
- Change Your Heart, Change Your Life
