= John Trent (author) =

American writer

John Trent is an author of marriage and family books such as The Blessing. He is the creator of the Lion, Otter, Golden Retriever, and Beaver (LOGB) way of looking at personalities. He is the President of StrongFamilies.com and the Center for StrongFamilies both are organizations committed to strengthening marriage and family relationships worldwide. He and his wife Cindy have been married for 30 years and have two daughters Kari and Laura.

== Bibliography ==
- The Blessing (together with Gary Smalley) - Gold Medallion winner for excellence in Christian publishing
- The Gift of Honor (together with Gary Smalley)
- The Language of Love (together with Gary Smalley) - Angel Award winner
- Love is a Decision (together with Gary Smalley)
- The Two Sides of Love (together with Gary Smalley)
- Home Remedies (together with Gary Smalley)
- The Hidden Value of a Man (together with Gary Smalley)
- Leaving The Lights On (together with Gary Smalley)
- LifeMapping
- Seeking Solid Ground, Love for All Seasons, (together with Rick Hicks)
- Go the Distance, (together with Charles W. Colson)
- The Making of a Godly Man Workbook
- Choosing to Live the Blessing
- The Two Degree Difference
- HeartShift
- Breaking the Cycle of Divorce
- The Light of Home

== Children's books ==
- The Treasure Tree (Gold Medallion winner)
- The Two Trails
- There's a Duck in My Closet!
- "I'd Choose You!"
- Spider Sisters, based on the special bond between his two daughters
- The Black and White Rainbow
- Bedtime Blessings and Bedtime Blessings Vol. 2.
- Super Hero Swamp
