= Trent Preszler =

American academic (born 1977)

Trent Preszler (born 1977) is professor of Practice in the Charles H. Dyson School of Applied Economics and Management at Cornell University where he teaches courses in the forest bioeconomy, outdoor recreation economy, and sustainable agriculture. Previously, he was CEO of Bedell Cellars and chairman of WineAmerica.

== Early life and education ==
A South Dakota native, Preszler attended a one-room schoolhouse near the Standing Rock Indian Reservation before graduating Phi Beta Kappa from Iowa State University in 1998.

After college, he worked as a White House intern for President Clinton, and spent a year abroad as a Rotary Scholar studying at the Royal Botanical Gardens, UK.

He later earned an MS in Agricultural Economics and PhD in Horticulture, both from Cornell University.

== Career ==
After the death of his father in 2014, Preszler built a wooden canoe using his father's tools. Newsday produced a short documentary film about Preszler's boatbuilding inspiration which won the 2018 New York Emmy Award for Best Lifestyle Program.

His eponymous Preszler Woodshop has been featured in The Wall Street Journal Magazine, Esquire, The New York Times, Robb Report, Financial Times, and OUT Magazine.

In 2021, the William Morrow imprint of HarperCollins published Preszler's memoir Little and Often, the story of how the inheritance of his father's toolbox helped him wrestle with grief, leading to self-discovery and forgiveness. It was named a Best Book of 2021 by USA Today, which described it as "a profound father-and-son odyssey." CBS Sunday Morning featured Preszler in a 2021 Father's Day special. The Little and Often audiobook was narrated by Golden Globe Award-winning actor Matt Bomer.

Previously, Preszler was CEO of Bedell Cellars and chairman of WineAmerica. The Bedell 2009 Merlot was the official red wine of Barack Obama's 2013 Inaugural Luncheon, the first time a New York-grown wine was served at a U.S. presidential inauguration.

In 2025, Algonquin Books published Preszler's Evergreen: The Trees That Shaped America, which explores "humanity’s deeply rooted relationship with evergreens."
