= Matt Moore (American football) =

American football player and executive (born 1984)

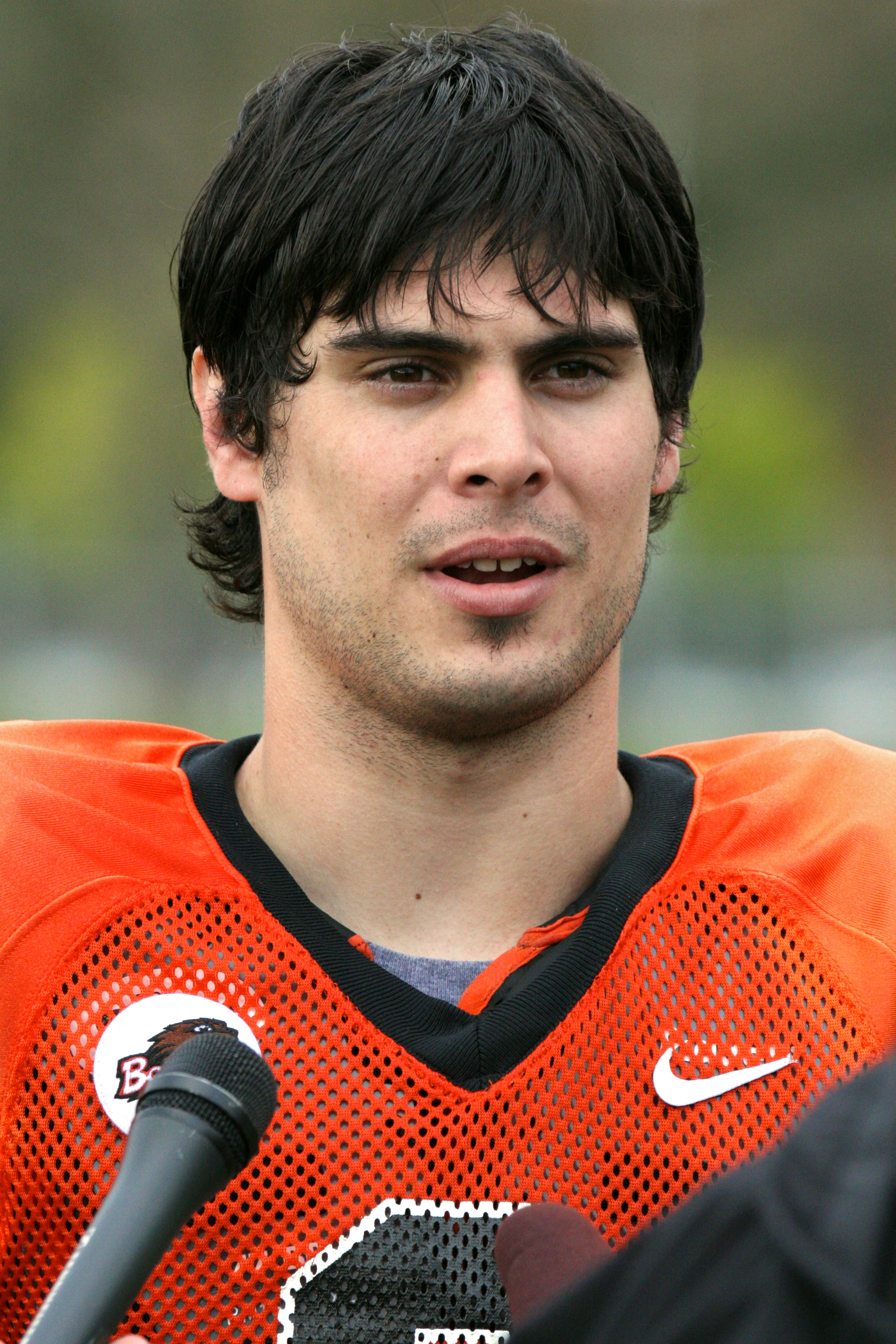
- Moore with the Oregon State Beavers in 2006

No. 3, 8
- Position: Quarterback

Personal information
- Born: August 9, 1984 (age 42); Van Nuys, California, U.S.
- Listed height: 6 ft 3 in (1.91 m)
- Listed weight: 219 lb (99 kg)

Career information
- High school: Hart (Santa Clarita, California)
- College: UCLA (2002–2003); Oregon State (2005–2006)
- NFL draft: 2007: undrafted

Career history

Playing
- Dallas Cowboys (2007)*; Carolina Panthers (2007–2010); Miami Dolphins (2011–2017); Kansas City Chiefs (2019–2020)
- * Offseason or practice squad member only

Operations
- Miami Dolphins (2019) Scout

Awards and highlights
- Super Bowl champion (LIV)

Career NFL statistics
- Passing attempts: 1,074
- Passing completions: 645
- Completion percentage: 60.1%
- TD–INT: 49–36
- Passing yards: 7,597
- Passer rating: 82.8
- Stats at Pro Football Reference

Matthew Erickson Moore (born August 9, 1984) is an American former professional quarterback in the National Football League (NFL). He played college football for the UCLA Bruins and Oregon State Beavers before signing with the Dallas Cowboys as an undrafted free agent in 2007.

Moore was cut by the Cowboys before the start of the 2007 regular season, and subsequently joined the Carolina Panthers, where he spent the first four seasons of his professional career primarily as a backup. He joined the Miami Dolphins in 2011 where he would spend the majority of his career at eight seasons. He started the most games of his career at 12 during his first year with the Dophins before returning to a backup role for the rest of his tenure with the team. He signed with the Kansas City Chiefs in 2019, where spent his final two seasons as a backup. He was notably part of the team that won Super Bowl LIV and spent most of the 2020 season on the practice squad.

== Early life ==
After playing youth football for six years with Palmdale Falcons Youth Football, Moore attended William S. Hart High School in Santa Clarita, California.

As a junior, Moore lettered in football while playing as a safety, earning All-CIF acclaim with 80 tackles and 10 interceptions on the season.

Moore lettered again during his senior year playing as Hart High School's starting quarterback. Moore led his team to a 13–0 record, culminating in a 42–13 win over Valencia in the CIF-Southern Section Division III title game. In the sectional, division title game, Moore completed 14 of 18 passes for 277 yards and four touchdowns and ran 15 times for 95 yards and one score. On the year, he completed 234 of 353 (66.3%) passes for 3,334 yards and 33 touchdowns and ran for 415 yards and seven scores. Moore was named the CIF-SS Division III Offensive Player of the Year. He was named First-team All-State and First-team All-CIF SS. He was selected to play in the 2002 North-South Shrine All-Star game.

Moore ended his senior season as one of the top-rated quarterbacks in the nation. He was ranked No. 8 by Scout.com and No. 11 by Rivals.com. SuperPrep rated him as the No. 8 quarterback in the nation and named him the FarWest Offensive Player of the Year. Max Emfinger named him to his All-America team and ranked him as a four-star prospect and the No. 17 quarterback prospect. PacWest Football rated Moore a four-star rating and rated him the No. 6 quarterback in the West and No. 9 in the nation. PrepStar named Moore to the All-American team and rated him the No. 5 quarterback in the West. He was named member of the Tacoma News Tribune Western 100, the Las Vegas Sun Super 11 second-team, the Los Angeles Times All-Star Team, and the First-team L.A. Times All-San Fernando Valley, which selected him as the region Player of the Year.

Moore lettered twice in baseball playing shortstop and third base.

== College career ==
=== 2002 ===
Moore began his college football career at UCLA. He was slated to redshirt, but was pressed into duty due to injuries to Cory Paus and Drew Olson against Cal. He appeared in six games as a true freshman, becoming the first Bruins' true-freshman quarterback to start since Cade McNown. The Bruins defeated Stanford in Moore's debut, making him the first true-freshman QB in his first game to lead UCLA to victory. He led the team to seven scoring drives against the Cardinal. He saw action against Arizona, USC, Washington State, and New Mexico in the Las Vegas Bowl as a reserve. Moore was 7 for 11 for 64 yards and one touchdown in the annual rivalry game against USC. For the season he completed 33 of 62 passes for 412 yards, two touchdowns and no interceptions.

=== 2003 ===
Moore started four of the eight games he appeared in at UCLA. He threw for 555 yards, two touchdowns, and six interceptions as a sophomore, completing 52 of 103 passes. He started the season opener against Colorado, but suffered a leg injury that sidelined him for the next three games. He had difficulty regaining the starting job with just eight pass attempts over the next three games. He moved back in front of Olson on the depth chart for the Oct 26 game at the Rose Bowl against Arizona State, passing for 190 yards and a touchdown in UCLA's 20–13 win. He also started the team's next two games against Stanford and Washington State. At the end of the season, Moore transferred from UCLA. (LA Times, December 5, 2003).

=== 2004 ===
Moore did not play in 2004 while attending the College of the Canyons in Santa Clarita, California. Although he had not played baseball since high school, he was selected in the 22nd round of the 2004 MLB draft by the Los Angeles Angels after scouts saw him play in a Southern California semi-pro baseball league and invited him to private workouts with the team.

=== 2005 ===
Although he also strongly considered Colorado State, Moore enrolled at Oregon State in January 2005 and participated in spring training with the team. Head coach Mike Riley announced him as the leader on the depth chart entering the 2005 season. He finished the season with 2,711 yards passing, the ninth-highest total for a single season at OSU. His .594 completion percentage was third among the 20-best single season yardage performances in school history. Moore injured his right knee in the second quarter of the 10th game of the season against Stanford and missed the remainder of the year. His 271.1 yards passing per game was second in the Pac-10, trailing only USC's Matt Leinart (293.5). Making yet another record-breaking debut, he threw for 367 yards in the season opener against Portland State, the most ever by a Beaver quarterback in his first start. Moore threw for a career-high 436 yards against Arizona, had 317 yards at Louisville, and 311 against Arizona State. He hit Mike Hass on a 63-yard touchdown strike against Washington State that gave OSU the lead 37–33 after the team trailed 30–13 late in the second quarter. He also had two 58-yard passes—one to Anthony Wheat-Brown in the team's upset of No. 18 California in Berkeley and the other one week later (again to Hass) in his return to the Rose Bowl.

=== 2006 ===
Moore started all 14 games for the Beavers and was an All-Pac-10 honorable mention leading the Beavers to a 10-win season capped off by a Sun Bowl victory against Mizzou. After a 2–3 start, Moore and coach Mike Riley received a great deal of criticism from fans. Both found redemption after winning the next 8 of 9 games. This streak included a win over #3 ranked USC and a Civil War win at home. On the season, Moore completed 229 of 378 passes for 3,022 yards and 18 touchdowns with seven interceptions. He set an Oregon State record for the most consecutive pass attempts without an interception with 183 before having that streak end in the Sun Bowl. He was named MVP of the Sun Bowl after throwing for 356 yards and four touchdowns and rushing for one touchdown. The 4 passing TDs were a Sun Bowl record. It was the second-highest scoring game in the Sun Bowl's 73-year history. He was 5-for-7 for 55 yards on the winning drive, setting up a 2-point conversion to put the Beavers up 39–38 with 22 seconds left to play.

== Professional career ==
Pre-draft measurables
Height	Weight	40-yard dash	10-yard split	20-yard split	20-yard shuttle	Three-cone drill	Vertical jump	Broad jump
6 ft 3 3/8 in (1.91 m)	192 lb (87 kg)	4.92 s	1.70 s	2.81 s	4.46 s	7.25 s	26.0 in (0.66 m)	8 ft 5 in (2.57 m)
All values from Pro Day

=== Dallas Cowboys ===
Moore was not selected in the 2007 NFL draft, but he was courted by the Dallas Cowboys and the Carolina Panthers, among other teams. Eventually, Moore signed as an undrafted free agent with the Cowboys. On signing with Dallas, Moore stated, "They had two quarterbacks on the roster; it was the Cowboys," adding "seemed like an easy choice to me at the time."

During the preseason, Moore completed 21-of-29 passes for 182 yards, a touchdown, and no interceptions for a 100.1 quarterback rating. On September 1, the Cowboys waived Moore during their final preseason cuts. Dallas intended to sign Moore to their practice squad had he passed through waivers, but he was claimed off waivers by the Panthers the following day.

=== Carolina Panthers ===
==== 2007 season ====
After being signed by the Panthers, Moore was listed as the third-string quarterback behind veterans Jake Delhomme and David Carr. Early in the season, Delhomme suffered a strained right elbow injury in a game against the Atlanta Falcons.

In Week 5, Moore saw his first regular season action in a game against the New Orleans Saints. Near the end of the first quarter, Moore entered the game after Carr suffered a back injury due to a sack. Moore's first NFL completion was a 43-yard pass to Keary Colbert; his playing time was brief as Carr returned to the field for the game's second half. The following day, Delhomme determined it would be best to undergo season-ending ligament-replacement surgery for his elbow injury. Due to Delhomme's season-ending surgery and Carr's back injury, the Panthers signed 20-year veteran quarterback Vinny Testaverde to their roster.

In Week 9, Moore briefly relieved Carr against the Tennessee Titans. In Week 12, in a 31–6 loss to the Saints, Moore entered the game after Carr's ineffective performance. A balky back kept Testaverde from starting Week 12, and Panthers' head coach John Fox stated that, if healthy enough, Testaverde would start in Week 13 over both Carr and Moore.

After six brief appearances during the season, Moore started his first NFL game in Week 15 against the Seattle Seahawks; Testaverde was ruled unable to play because of "general soreness." Moore led the Panthers to victory against the Seahawks while completing 19-of-27 passes for 208 yards without a turnover. The following week, the Panthers suffered a loss against the Cowboys, while Moore went 15-of-28 pass attempts for 182 yards, a touchdown, and an interception. During the game, Steve Smith hauled in Moore's first NFL touchdown pass. The Panthers ended the season with a road win against the Tampa Bay Buccaneers, in which Moore completed 15-of-24 pass attempts for 174 yards, two touchdowns, and an interception. After these performances, Moore was named the NFL Offensive Rookie of the Month for December. Overall, in the 2007 season, Moore finished with 730 passing yards, three touchdowns, and five interceptions.

==== 2008 season ====
Moore played in all four 2008 preseason games for the Panthers; during the final preseason game against the Pittsburgh Steelers, Moore injured his leg. Moore was cleared to practice as two x-rays and an MRI revealed no broken bones. However, during a practice, Moore injured his leg, and an x-ray revealed a broken fibula. Panthers' general manager Marty Hurney initially stated Moore would not be placed on injured reserve. Despite this, Moore was sidelined the entire 2008 season, and spent the last 12 weeks of the season listed as inactive.

==== 2009 season ====
Moore saw his first action of the 2009 season when backup quarterback Josh McCown was injured during the Panthers' Week 1 loss to the Philadelphia Eagles. Moore finished with 63 yards, one touchdown, and one interception. In a Week 8 win, Moore played briefly against the Arizona Cardinals, attempting one pass which was incomplete.

After starter Jake Delhomme broke his finger in a Week 12 loss to the New York Jets, Moore started in Week 13 against the Buccaneers. He completed 14-of-20 passes for 161 yards and an interception, en route to a 16–6 Panthers' victory. The following week, he completed 15-of-30 passes for 197 yards and a touchdown in a 20–10 loss to the New England Patriots.

In Week 15 (his sixth start), Moore had the best game of his career when he led the Panthers to a 26–7 upset victory over the Minnesota Vikings. In the victory, he completed 21-of-33 passes for 299 yards, 3 touchdowns, and 0 interceptions, improving to a career 4–2 record as a starter. He drew praise from head coach John Fox and top receiver Steve Smith, who caught nine passes from Moore for 157 yards and a score.

In Week 16, Moore completed 15-of-20 pass attempts for 171 yards, and, for the second consecutive week, three touchdowns with no interceptions; Carolina beat the New York Giants 41–9. Moore had a career-high 139.8 passer rating. The victory came during the final game to be played in Giants Stadium, and essentially eliminated the Giants from the playoffs, in their worst home loss since 1998. Moore drew praise outside of the Panthers from analysts such as Tony Dungy, who said that Moore "looked liked a pro-bowler".

Moore started the last game of the Panthers' season on January 3, 2010, as the Panthers beat the Saints 23–10. The Saints, who were the No. 1 seed in the NFC, were handed their third loss of the season as they rested most of their starters. Moore went 14-of-23 pass attempts for 162 yards and a touchdown. The win improved the Panthers to .500 with an 8–8 record (4–1 with Moore as starter) to finish the season.

In his five games as a starter for the 2009 season, Moore threw eight touchdown passes with one interception. The strong finish by Moore and the Panthers, combined with earlier poor play by Delhomme, led to speculation that Moore would challenge/replace Jake Delhomme for the starting quarterback role for the 2010 season, despite Delhomme's large contract. In turn, Delhomme was cut from the Panthers on March 4, 2010.

==== 2010 season ====
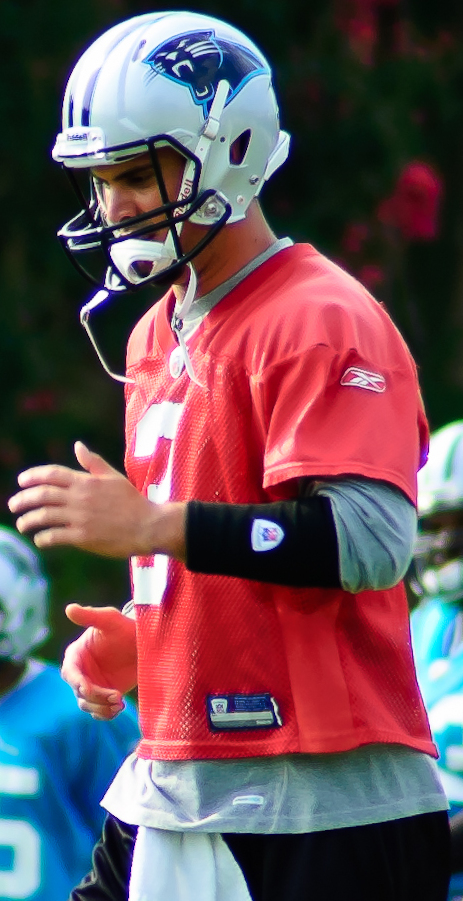
Moore in 2010

Moore was declared the starter for the 2010 season after Delhomme's release. Despite this, the Panthers selected Jimmy Clausen in the second round (48th overall) of the 2010 NFL draft. Though Moore had clearly established himself as the Panthers' starting quarterback, he faced pressure from Clausen. Moore suffered a concussion during the season opener at the New York Giants, and he was benched in a Week 2 loss against the Buccaneers following poor play. On September 20, 2010, Moore was removed as the Panthers' starting quarterback, in favor of rookie Clausen, after throwing four interceptions in the first two games.

On October 18, after sitting out for three consecutive games, Moore was again declared the Panthers' starting quarterback following poor play by Clausen. In Week 7, during his return as a starter against the San Francisco 49ers, Moore completed 28-of-41 pass attempts for 308 yards, two touchdowns and one interception, setting career highs in both yards and completions.

In a Week 9 loss to the New Orleans Saints, Moore injured his shoulder after a hit from defensive tackle Sedrick Ellis. He was placed on injured reserve by the Panthers, ending his season.

=== Miami Dolphins ===
==== 2011 season ====
Moore was signed by the Dolphins on July 28, 2011, to back up Chad Henne. He switched numbers, from #3 to #8. In Week 4, Moore entered the game against the San Diego Chargers in the first quarter after Henne went down with a shoulder injury. He completed 17-of-26 passes for 167 yards and an interception, compiling a 67.3 quarterback rating. In Week 9, he became the first Dolphins' quarterback since 2008 (Chad Pennington) to throw three touchdown passes in a game, in their 31–3 win over the Kansas City Chiefs. He was named AFC Offensive Player of the Week for his performance. Moore repeated the feat in Week 11, blowing out the Buffalo Bills 35–8, and had the highest QB rating of the week. Following the season, he was named as the Dolphins' 2011 season MVP. Overall, Moore finished the 2011 season with 2,497 yards, 16 touchdowns, and nine interceptions.

==== 2012 season ====
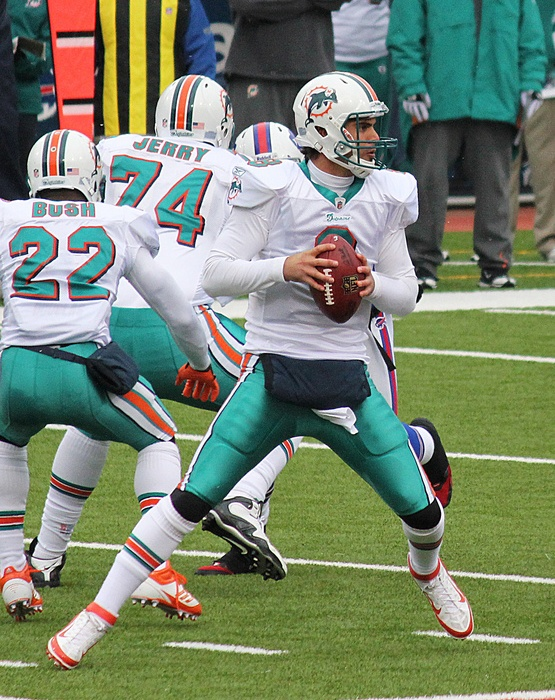
Moore in 2012

During the offseason, Moore was battling for the starting quarterback role against Miami's 2012 NFL draft first-round selection Ryan Tannehill and newly signed 9-year Jacksonville Jaguars veteran David Garrard. On September 4, 2012, Moore became the second-string quarterback behind rookie starter Tannehill after Garrard was released. During a Week 8 victory of 30–9 over the Jets, Moore went in for Tannehill after the latter left the game with injuries to his left knee and thigh. Moore completed 11-of-19 passes for a touchdown.

==== 2013 season ====
On March 8, 2013, Moore re-signed with the Dolphins, agreeing on a two-year deal to remain a backup for Tannehill. He did not see much action in the 2013 season. His lone appearance came in Week 16 against the Buffalo Bills, where he was 2-of-6 pass attempts for 53 yards and two interceptions in a 19–0 loss.

==== 2014 season ====
In the 2014 season, Moore saw action in two games. On September 28, against the Oakland Raiders, he relieved Tannehill at the end of the 38–14 victory. On November 2, Moore was 2-of-4 for 21 yards in the 37–0 victory over the San Diego Chargers.

==== 2015 season ====
In the 2015 season, Moore only appeared in one game. In the 44–26 victory over the Houston Texans, he completed one pass for 14 yards and ran out the clock at the end of the game in relief of Tannehill.

==== 2016 season ====
On March 15, 2016, Moore re-signed with the Dolphins, agreeing on a two-year deal worth $3.5 million to remain a backup for Tannehill. In Week 14 against the Arizona Cardinals, Moore saw his first action as quarterback for the season. He replaced Tannehill in the fourth quarter, after Tannehill was injured on a low hit by Cardinals' defensive end Calais Campbell. The injury would later be confirmed as a sprained left MCL and ACL. Moore led a game-winning field goal drive, highlighted by his 29-yard pass to wide receiver Kenny Stills in the final quarter to put the Dolphins on the Cardinals' 3-yard line. After a couple of plays, Dolphins' kicker Andrew Franks kicked a 21-yard field goal in heavy rain to win the game 26–23, keeping the Dolphins' playoff hopes alive. The following week, Moore started for the first time since 2011. Against the Jets, completing 12-of-18 passes for 236 yards and a career-high four touchdowns with one interception, as the Dolphins beat the Jets 34–13, improving their season record to 9–5 and clinching their first winning season since 2008. With his performance, Moore was named AFC Offensive Player of the Week.

Moore was named the starting quarterback for the Dolphins against the Pittsburgh Steelers in the Wild Card Round as Tannehill did not appear to be fully recovered. This was Moore's first career playoff game. The Dolphins lost 30–12 to the Steelers in Pittsburgh.

==== 2017 season ====
On August 3, 2017, Tannehill suffered a season-ending injury, prompting the Dolphins to reach out to a retired Jay Cutler. Moore would stay on as backup for Cutler. During Week 7 against the Jets, Moore entered the game after Cutler suffered a chest injury in the third quarter. Moore finished with 188 passing yards, two touchdowns, and an interception as the Dolphins won 31–28. Due to Cutler's injury, Moore started the Week 8 game against the Baltimore Ravens, throwing for 176 yards and 2 interceptions as the Dolphins suffered a blowout loss on the road 40–0. Both of his interceptions were returned for touchdowns. During the Week 11 game against the Buccaneers, Cutler took a hit to the head on the final play of the first half and was relieved by Moore, who threw for 282 yards and 1 touchdown as the Dolphins lost 30–20. Due to Cutler being in concussion protocol, Moore started in Week 12 against the Patriots at Gillette Stadium. He finished with 215 passing yards, one touchdown, and two interceptions in the 35–17 loss.

=== Kansas City Chiefs ===
==== 2019 season ====
Moore spent the 2018 season out of football, though he did receive offers to play. In 2019, he worked as a scout for the Miami Dolphins during the draft process. He had started working as an assistant coach for a high school football team when he signed with the Chiefs on August 26, 2019, following an injury to backup quarterback Chad Henne.

In Week 7 on Thursday Night Football against the Denver Broncos, Moore took over as the Chiefs' quarterback after Patrick Mahomes injured his knee. Moore finished the game against the Broncos going 10-of-19 pass attempts for 117 yards and a touchdown pass. The following week, Moore started in place of the injured Mahomes against the Green Bay Packers and had 267 passing yards and two touchdowns in the 31–24 loss. In Week 9, against the Vikings, he had 275 passing yards and a touchdown in the 26–23 victory. Moore's performance against the Vikings was his last significant action of the 2019 season as Mahomes returned from injury in Week 10. Moore served as backup quarterback in the Chiefs' first Super Bowl appearance since Super Bowl IV in 1970, where they clinched the win against the San Francisco 49ers with a score of 31–20 in Super Bowl LIV.

==== 2020 season ====
Moore re-signed with the Chiefs on July 10, 2020. He was released on September 5 and signed to the practice squad the following day. He was elevated to the active roster on January 2, 2021, for the team's Week 17 game against the Los Angeles Chargers, and reverted to the practice squad after. He was elevated again on February 6 for Super Bowl LV against the Buccaneers.

Moore's practice squad contract with the team expired after the season on February 7.

== Career statistics ==
=== NFL ===
Legend
	Won the Super Bowl
**Bold**	Career high

==== Regular season ====
General					Passing										Rushing					
Year	Team	GP	GS	W–L	Comp	Att	Pct	Yds	Y/A	Y/G	TD	Int	Rate	Sck	Att	Yds	Y/A	Y/G	TD	Fum
2007	CAR	9	3	2–1	63	111	56.8	730	6.6	81.1	3	5	67.0	6	3	5	1.7	0.6	0	2
2008	CAR	0	0	—	DNP															
2009	CAR	7	5	4–1	85	138	61.6	1,053	7.6	150.4	8	2	98.5	9	12	−3	−0.3	−0.4	0	2
2010	CAR	6	5	1–4	79	143	55.2	857	6.0	142.8	5	**10**	55.6	13	5	25	**5.0**	4.2	0	4
2011	MIA	13	12	6–6	**210**	**347**	60.5	**2,497**	7.2	192.1	**16**	9	87.1	**36**	**32**	**65**	2.0	**5.0**	**2**	**14**
2012	MIA	2	0	—	11	19	57.9	131	6.9	65.5	1	0	96.6	2	5	−3	−0.6	−1.5	0	0
2013	MIA	1	0	—	2	6	33.3	53	8.8	53.0	0	2	27.1	0	0	0	0.0	0.0	0	0
2014	MIA	2	0	—	2	4	50.0	21	5.3	10.5	0	0	65.6	0	2	−2	−1.0	−1.0	0	0
2015	MIA	1	0	—	1	1	**100.0**	14	**14.0**	14.0	0	0	**118.8**	0	3	−2	−0.7	−2.0	0	0
2016	MIA	4	3	2–1	55	87	63.2	721	8.3	180.3	8	3	105.6	1	1	−1	−1.0	−0.3	0	1
2017	MIA	4	2	0–2	78	127	61.4	861	6.8	**215.3**	4	5	75.6	12	3	9	3.0	2.3	0	0
2019	KC	4	2	1–1	59	91	64.8	659	7.2	164.8	4	0	100.9	8	3	1	0.3	0.3	0	2
2020	KC	0	0	—	DNP															
Career		53	32	16–16	645	1,074	60.1	7,597	7.1	143.3	49	36	82.8	87	69	94	1.4	1.8	2	26

==== Postseason ====
General					Passing										Rushing					
Year	Team	GP	GS	W–L	Comp	Att	Pct	Yds	Y/A	Y/G	TD	Int	Rate	Sck	Att	Yds	Y/A	Y/G	TD	Fum
2016	MIA	1	1	0–1	29	36	80.6	289	8.0	289.0	1	1	97.8	5	1	2	2.0	2.0	0	2
Career		1	1	0–1	29	36	80.6	289	8.0	289.0	1	1	97.8	5	1	2	2.0	2.0	0	2

=== College ===
Season	Team	Games	Passing								Rushing			
Season	Team	GP	Comp	Att	Pct	Yards	Avg	TD	Int	Rate	Att	Yards	Avg	TD
2002	UCLA	5	33	62	53.2	412	6.6	2	0	119.7	8	-34	-4.3	0
2003	UCLA	8	52	103	50.5	555	5.4	2	6	90.5	20	–81	−4.1	0
2005	Oregon State	10	211	355	59.4	2,711	7.6	11	**19**	123.1	61	-100	-1.6	3
2006	Oregon State	**14**	**229**	**378**	**60.6**	**3,022**	**8.0**	**18**	7	**139.7**	**77**	**–11**	**-0.1**	**5**
Career		37	525	898	58.5	6,700	7.5	33	32	126.1	166	–226	–1.4	8
