= Jordan Pugh =

American football player (born 1988)

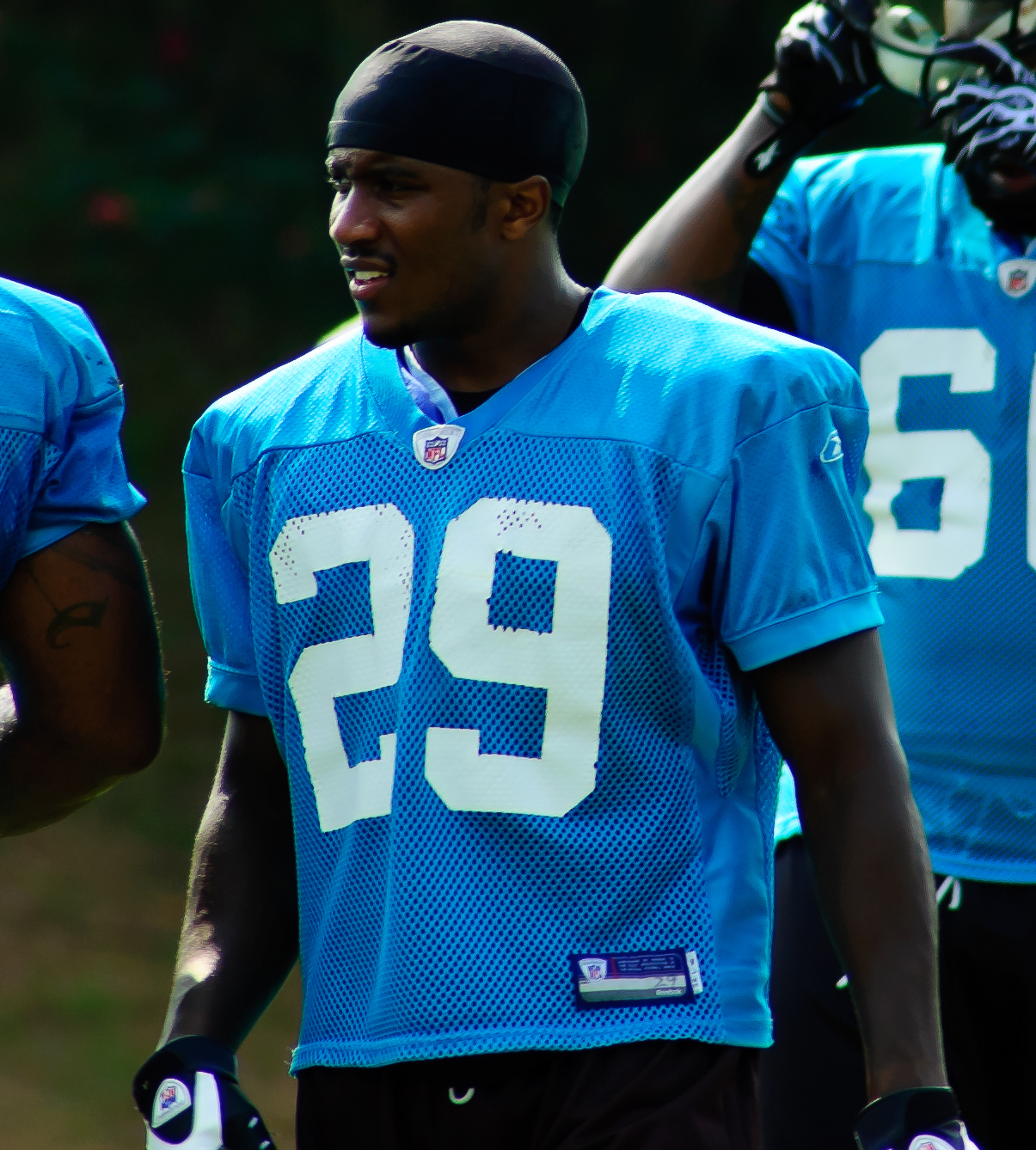
- Pugh with the Carolina Panthers in 2010

No. 29, 32
- Position: Safety

Personal information
- Born: January 29, 1988 (age 38); Plano, Texas, U.S.
- Listed height: 5 ft 11 in (1.80 m)
- Listed weight: 210 lb (95 kg)

Career information
- High school: Plano West
- College: Texas A&M
- NFL draft: 2010: 6th round, 202nd overall pick

Career history
- Carolina Panthers (2010–2011); Washington Redskins (2012–2013); New Orleans Saints (2013)

Career NFL statistics
- Total tackles: 50
- Sacks: 1
- Pass deflections: 4
- Interceptions: 1
- Forced fumbles: 1
- Stats at Pro Football Reference

Jordan Alexander Pugh (born January 29, 1988) is an American former professional football player who was a safety in the National Football League (NFL). He played college football for the Texas A&M Aggies and was selected in the sixth round of the 2010 NFL draft by the Carolina Panthers. He also played for the Washington Redskins.

== Early career ==
From Plano, Texas, Pugh graduated from Plano West Senior High School in 2006. In college at Texas A&M University, Pugh played both cornerback and safety. He played cornerback as a freshman and junior, and lined up at safety as a sophomore and senior. He totaled 221 tackles, four interceptions, 19 pass deflections, and four forced fumbles. He picked up All-Big 12 Honorable Mention honors his senior season.

== Professional career ==
=== Carolina Panthers ===
Pugh ran a 4.48-second 40-yard dash and recorded a 40.5-inch vertical leap during Texas A&M's 2010 Pro Day. He was selected by the Carolina Panthers in the sixth round (202nd overall) of the 2010 NFL draft.

He was released on August 31, 2012, for final roster cuts before the start of the 2012 season.

=== Washington Redskins ===
On September 10, 2012, Pugh was signed by the Washington Redskins to replace Jordan Bernstine, who suffered a season-ending injury. He would record his first career sack on Joe Flacco in the Week 14 win against the Baltimore Ravens.

The Redskins released Pugh on October 15, 2013. He was re-signed on October 22, 2013, to replace a suspended Brandon Meriweather. He intercepted Peyton Manning in the loss to the Denver Broncos. Pugh was released again on October 29 after Meriweather returned from suspension.

=== New Orleans Saints ===
On January 6, 2014, the New Orleans Saints signed Pugh before the Saints' playoff game against the Seattle Seahawks. He was not re-signed for the 2014 season.

== Personal life ==
Pugh is the great-great nephew of the late former professional baseball player, Buster Clarkson.
