= Trent =

Trent may refer to:

== Places ==
=== Australia ===
- Trent, Western Australia, a locality of the Shire of Denmark

=== Canada ===
- Trent Hills, a municipality in Ontario
- Trent Lakes, a municipality in Ontario

=== Germany ===
- Trent, Germany, a municipality on the island of Rügen

=== Italy ===
- Trento in northern Italy, site of the Council of Trent

=== United Kingdom ===
- Trent, Dorset, England

=== United States ===
- Trent, Kentucky, United States
- Trent, Oregon, United States
- Trent, South Dakota, United States
- Trent, Texas, United States

== Water courses ==
- River Trent, a major waterway of the English Midlands
  - Places along this river:
  - Aston-on-Trent, Derbyshire
  - Barrow upon Trent, Derbyshire
  - Burton upon Trent, Staffordshire
  - Carlton-on-Trent, Nottinghamshire
  - Newark-on-Trent, Nottinghamshire
  - Radcliffe on Trent, Nottinghamshire
  - Stoke-on-Trent, a city in Staffordshire
  - Sutton-on-Trent, Nottinghamshire
  - Trent Vale, Staffordshire
  - Walton-on-Trent, Derbyshire
  - Weston-on-Trent, Derbyshire
- Trent River (Ontario)

- Trent–Severn Waterway

== Ships and boats ==
- HMS Trent, various Royal Navy ships
- RMS Trent, a British steamship involved in the Trent Affair during the US Civil War
- SS Trent, a steamship built in 1899
- Trent-class lifeboat, used by the Royal National Lifeboat Institution in the UK

== Avionics ==
- Rolls-Royce RB.50 Trent, Rolls-Royce first turboprop engine
- Rolls-Royce RB.203 Trent, a turbofan engine
- Rolls-Royce Trent, a turbofan engine family manufactured by Rolls-Royce plc after the RB211

== Other uses ==
- Council of Trent, a 16th-century Catholic council, held in Trento in northern Italy, in response to the Protestant Reformation
- Baron Trent, a title in the Peerage of the United Kingdom
- Trent University, a university located in Peterborough, Ontario
- Nottingham Trent University, a university in Nottingham, UK, formerly Trent Polytechnic
- Trent, an Alice and Bob placeholder used in cryptography, referring to a trusted arbitrator or third party
- Trent railway station, a closed British railway station
- Trent Limited, the retail arm of Tata group
- Trent Accreditation Scheme, an international healthcare accreditation scheme headquartered in Sheffield, UK, in the former UK NHS Trent Region
- Trent Bridge, an international and county cricket ground in Nottingham, England

== See also ==
- Trent Affair, an incident in 1861 during the US Civil War
