= Trent Guy =

American gridiron football player (born 1987)

No. 80
- Position: Slotback

Personal information
- Born: August 22, 1987 (age 39); Charlotte, North Carolina, U.S.
- Listed height: 5 ft 9 in (1.75 m)
- Listed weight: 170 lb (77 kg)

Career information
- High school: West Charlotte (NC)
- College: Louisville
- NFL draft: 2010: undrafted

Career history
- 2010: Oakland Raiders*
- 2010–2011: Carolina Panthers*
- 2012–2013: Montreal Alouettes
- 2013–2014: Toronto Argonauts
- * Offseason or practice squad member only

Awards and highlights
- Second-team All-Big East (2009)
- Stats at Pro Football Reference
- Stats at CFL.ca (archive)

Trenton Guy (born August 22, 1987) is an American former professional football slotback. He played college football at the University of Louisville. He was a member of the Oakland Raiders, Carolina Panthers, Montreal Alouettes, and Toronto Argonauts.

== Early life ==
Guy attended West Charlotte High School in Charlotte, North Carolina.

== Professional career ==
Guy was signed by the Oakland Raiders on April 24, 2010, after going undrafted in the 2010 NFL draft.

Guy signed with the Carolina Panthers on April 30, 2010. He was released by the Panthers on September 4, and signed to the Panthers' practice squad on September 6, 2010. He was released by the Panthers on August 27, 2011.

Guy was signed by the Montreal Alouettes on January 27, 2012. He was released by the Alouettes on February 1, 2013.

Guy signed with the Toronto Argonauts on June 2, 2013. He was granted free agency at the end of the 2013 CFL season. He signed with the Argonauts on August 11, 2014. On September 30, 2014, Guy was released by the Argonauts.
