= List of Carolina Panthers first-round draft picks =

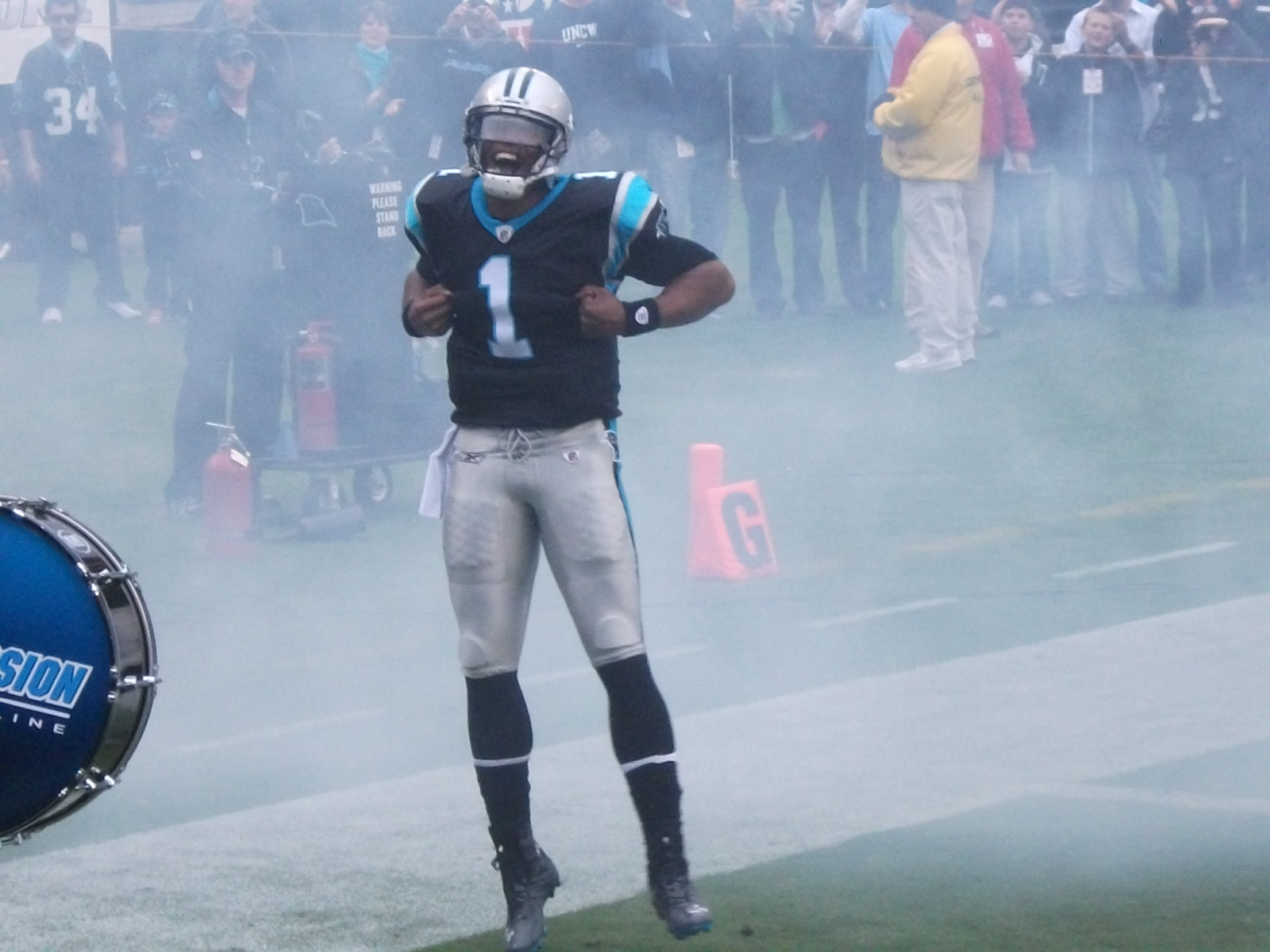
Cam Newton was the Panthers' first ever first-overall selection (2011), and went on to win the AP Offensive Rookie of the Year award.

The Carolina Panthers joined the National Football League (NFL) in 1995 as the league's 29th franchise. Their first ever selection was Kerry Collins, a quarterback from Penn State, in the 1995 NFL draft. The team's most recent first-round selection (19th pick overall) was Monroe Freeling, an offensive tackle from Georgia, in the 2026 NFL draft.

Every year during April, each NFL franchise seeks to add new players to its roster through a collegiate draft officially known as "the NFL Annual Player Selection Meeting" but more commonly known as the NFL Draft. Teams are ranked in inverse order based on the previous season's record, with the worst record picking first, and the second worst picking second and so on. The two exceptions to this order are made for teams that appeared in the previous Super Bowl; the Super Bowl champion always picks 32nd, and the Super Bowl loser always picks 31st. Teams have the option of trading away their picks to other teams for different picks, players, cash, or a combination thereof. Thus, it is not uncommon for a team's actual draft pick to differ from their assigned draft pick, or for a team to have extra or no draft picks in any round due to these trades.

The Panthers' have only selected first overall twice, once in 2011 when they selected quarterback Cam Newton out of Auburn, and once in 2023 when they traded up to draft Bryce Young from Alabama. They would have picked first in 2002, however, the inception of the Houston Texans that year allowed Houston to pick first instead of Carolina. Carolina had the first overall pick in their inaugural season, but traded the pick to the Cincinnati Bengals for the 5th and 36th overall selection. The Panthers have twice selected a Miami Hurricanes player in the first round: linebackers Dan Morgan in 2001 and Jon Beason in 2007.

Collins, the team's first ever selection, made the Pro Bowl and led the Panthers to the playoffs in only their second season of existence, but he was later released after struggling on and off the field with alcoholism. Rae Carruth began his career as a promising wide receiver, but he was dropped from the team after being arrested for hiring someone to kill his pregnant girlfriend (he would later be convicted of the crime). Julius Peppers won Rookie of the Year, was named to the Pro Bowl on several occasions, and was the centerpiece of the Panthers' defensive line until signing with the Chicago Bears. Dan Morgan was also a highly touted Pro Bowl linebacker, but repeated concussions had caused him to miss parts of several seasons until the Panthers released him in 2008. The Panthers drafted Jon Beason in 2007 partially to insure their defense against Morgan's absence. Newton threw for 422 yards in his debut game, an NFL record, went on to set several passing records as a rookie, and won the AP Offensive Rookie of the Year award. Luke Kuechly led the NFL in tackles his rookie year, and won the AP Defensive Rookie of the Year award one year after Newton's offensive ROTY.

When the Panthers and Jacksonville Jaguars joined the league together in 1995, both teams participated in an expansion draft, where they selected players from 30 existing NFL teams. This list does not include players selected in that draft.

== Key ==
^{§}	Denotes player who has been selected NFL Most Valuable Player
^{†}	Denotes player who has been selected AP NFL Offensive Player of the Year or Defensive Player of the Year
^{‡}	Denotes player who has been selected AP Offensive or Defensive Rookie of the Year
^{#}	Denotes player who has been selected to the Pro Bowl with the Panthers
**Bold**	Denotes player who is currently active in the NFL

== Player selections ==
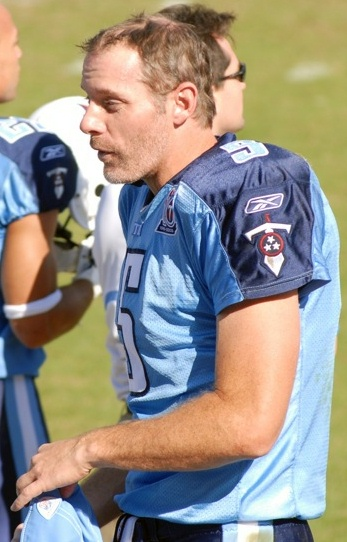
Kerry Collins, shown here as a member of the Tennessee Titans, was the Panthers' first ever first-round draft pick, and went to the Pro Bowl.

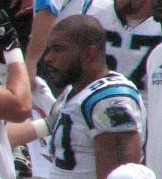
Julius Peppers was selected second overall in 2002, and was named to four All-Pro teams.

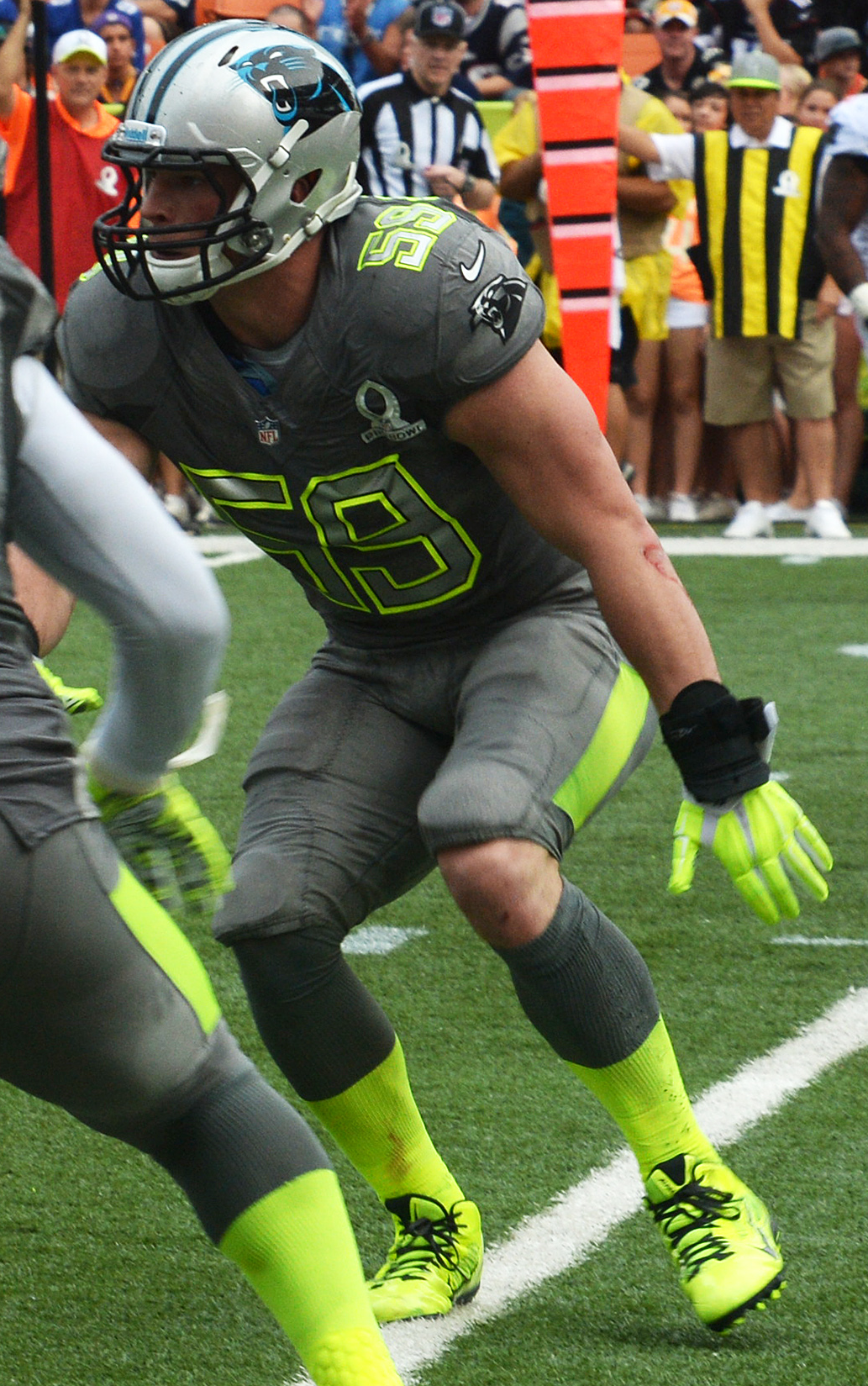
Luke Kuechly was drafted ninth overall from Boston College, and won the AP Defensive Rookie of the Year award in 2012.

Year	Pick	Player name	Position	College	Awards
1995	5 (Note: The Panthers acquired this pick from the Bengals in exchange for the fifth and 36th picks.)	Kerry Collins ^{#}	QB	Penn State	*Pro Football Weekly/PFWA All-Rookie (1995); *Pro Bowl (1996)
1995	22	Tyrone Poole	CB	Fort Valley State	*Pro Football Weekly/PFWA All-Rookie (1995)
1995	29	Blake Brockermeyer	OT	Texas	*Pro Football Weekly/PFWA All-Rookie (1995)
1996	8	Tshimanga Biakabutuka	RB	Michigan	
1997	27	Rae Carruth	WR	Colorado	*Pro Football Weekly All-Rookie (1997)
1998	14	Jason Peter	DE	Nebraska	
1999	— (Note: The Panthers traded their 1999 and 2000 first round picks to Washington for defensive end Sean Gilbert.)	No Pick (traded to New Orleans)			
2000	23 (Note: The Panthers acquired this pick from Miami in exchange for their 1998 2nd-round pick (44th overall, used to select Patrick Surtain); the Panthers' original first-round selection had been traded to Washington.)	Rashard Anderson	DB	Jackson State	
2001	11	Dan Morgan ^{#}	LB	Miami (FL)	*Pro Football Weekly All-Rookie (2001); *Pro Bowl (2004)
2002	2 (Note: Although the Panthers finished the previous season with a league-worst 1-15 record, the first overall pick was awarded to an expansion team, the Houston Texans.)	Julius Peppers ^{‡} ^{#}	DE	North Carolina	*Pro Football Weekly All-Rookie (2002); *AP Defensive Rookie of the Year (2002); *5× Pro Bowl (2004, 2005, 2006, 2008, 2009); *4× All-Pro (2004, 2006, 2008, 2009)
2003	8	Jordan Gross ^{#}	OT	Utah	*Pro Football Weekly All-Rookie (2003); *3× Pro Bowl (2008, 2010, 2013); *All-Pro (2008)
2004	28	Chris Gamble	CB	Ohio State	*Pro Football Weekly All-Rookie (2004)
2005	14	Thomas Davis ^{#}	LB	Georgia	*Walter Payton NFL Man of the Year (2014); *3x Pro Bowl (2015, 2016, 2017)
2006	27	DeAngelo Williams ^{#}	RB	Memphis	*Pro Bowl (2009); *All-Pro (2008)
2007	25 (Note: The Panthers acquired this pick, a second-round (59th overall, used to select Ryan Kalil) and fifth-round (164th overall), used to select Tim Shaw selections from the New York Jets in exchange for the Panthers' first-round (14th overall, used to select Darrelle Revis) and sixth-round (191st overall, later traded to Green Bay, used to select Korey Hall) picks.)	Jon Beason ^{#}	LB	Miami (FL)	*Pro Football Weekly/PFWA All-Rookie (2007); *3x Pro Bowl (2008, 2009, 2010); *2x All-Pro (2008, 2009)
2008	13	Jonathan Stewart ^{#}	RB	Oregon	*Pro Bowl (2015)
2008	19 (Note: The Panthers acquired this pick from the Eagles in exchange for their 2008 2nd (43rd overall) and 4th (109th overall) round picks, as well as their 2009 1st round pick.)	Jeff Otah	OT	Pittsburgh	
2009	No Pick (traded to Buffalo)				
2010	No Pick (traded to San Francisco) (Note: The Panthers traded their 2010 first-round pick to the San Francisco 49ers in exchange for their 2009 second and fourth-round selections (43rd and 111th overall, respectively).)				
2011	1	Cam Newton^{§} ^{†} ^{‡} ^{#}	QB	Auburn	*Pro Football Weekly/PFWA All-Rookie (2011); *AP Offensive Rookie of the Year (2011); *AP Offensive Player of the Year (2015); *NFL Most Valuable Player (2015); *3x Pro Bowl (2011, 2013, 2015); *All-Pro (2015)
2012	9	Luke Kuechly ^{†} ^{‡} ^{#}	LB	Boston College	*Pro Football Weekly/PFWA All-Rookie (2012); *AP Defensive Rookie of the Year (2012); *AP Defensive Player of the Year (2013); *7x Pro Bowl (2013, 2014, 2015, 2016, 2017, 2018, 2019); *7x All-Pro (2013, 2014, 2015, 2016, 2017, 2018, 2019)
2013	14	Star Lotulelei	DT	Utah	*PFWA All-Rookie (2013)
2014	28	Kelvin Benjamin	WR	Florida State	
2015	25	Shaq Thompson	LB	Washington	
2016	30	Vernon Butler	DT	Louisiana Tech	
2017	8	**Christian McCaffrey** ^{#}	RB	Stanford	*Pro Bowl (2019); *2x All-Pro (2018, 2019)
2018	24	**D. J. Moore**	WR	Maryland	*PFWA All-Rookie (2018)
2019	16	**Brian Burns** ^{#}	DE	Florida State	*Pro Bowl (2021, 2022)
2020	7	**Derrick Brown** ^{#}	DT	Auburn	*PFWA All-Rookie (2020); *Pro Bowl (2023)
2021	8	**Jaycee Horn** ^{#}	CB	South Carolina	*Pro Bowl (2024)
2022	6	**Ikem Ekwonu**	OT	NC State	
2023	1	**Bryce Young**	QB	Alabama	
2024	32	**Xavier Legette**	WR	South Carolina	
2025	8	**Tetairoa McMillan**	WR	Arizona	AP Offensive Rookie of the Year (2025)
2026	19	**Monroe Freeling**	OT	Georgia	

== Notes ==
Notes

Footnotes
