= List of Carolina Panthers Pro Bowl selections =

This is a list of Carolina Panthers players who were elected to the Pro Bowl, the annual all-star game of the NFL. Pro Bowl rosters are determined by a combination of fan, player, and coach voting. In 2015, the Panthers had a franchise record 10 players selected to the Pro Bowl.

The year indicates the season for which the player was elected, not the year in which the game was played.

== List of players ==
Carolina Panthers Pro Bowlers
Player	Position	Year
Dom Capers	HC	1996
Michael Bates	KR	1996
Kerry Collins	QB	1996
Eric Davis	CB	1996
Kevin Greene	LB	1996
John Kasay	K	1996
Lamar Lathon	LB	1996
Sam Mills	LB	1996
Wesley Walls	TE	1996
Michael Bates (2)	KR	1997
Wesley Walls (2)	TE	1997
Michael Bates (3)	KR	1998
Kevin Greene (2)	LB	1998
Wesley Walls (3)	TE	1998
Michael Bates (4)	KR	1999
Steve Beuerlein	QB	1999
Muhsin Muhammad	WR	1999
Wesley Walls (4)	TE	1999
Michael Bates (5)	KR	2000
Todd Sauerbrun	P	2001
Steve Smith	KR	2001
Wesley Walls (5)	TE	2001
Kris Jenkins	DT	2002
Todd Sauerbrun (2)	P	2002
Stephen Davis	RB	2003
Kris Jenkins (2)	DT	2003
Mike Rucker	DE	2003
Todd Sauerbrun (3)	P	2003
Mark Fields	LB	2004
Dan Morgan	LB	2004
Muhsin Muhammad (2)	WR	2004
Julius Peppers	DE	2004
Jake Delhomme	QB	2005
Julius Peppers (2)	DE	2005
Steve Smith (2)	WR	2005
Mike Wahle	G	2005
Kris Jenkins (3)	DT	2006
Julius Peppers (3)	DE	2006
Steve Smith (3)	WR	2006
Jon Beason	LB	2008
Jordan Gross	T	2008
Julius Peppers (4)	DE	2008
Steve Smith (4)	WR	2008
Jon Beason (2)	LB	2009
Ryan Kalil	C	2009
Julius Peppers (5)	DE	2009
DeAngelo Williams	RB	2009
Jon Beason (3)	LB	2010
Jordan Gross (2)	T	2010
Ryan Kalil (2)	C	2010
Ryan Kalil (3)	C	2011
Cam Newton	QB	2011
Steve Smith (5)	WR	2011
Ron Rivera	HC	2013
Jordan Gross (3)	T	2013
Greg Hardy	DE	2013
J. J. Jansen	LS	2013
Ryan Kalil (4)	C	2013
Luke Kuechly	LB	2013
Cam Newton (2)	QB	2013
Mike Tolbert	FB	2013
Greg Olsen	TE	2014
Luke Kuechly (2)	LB	2014
Cam Newton (3)	QB	2015
Jonathan Stewart	RB	2015
Greg Olsen (2)	TE	2015
Ryan Kalil (5)	C	2015
Trai Turner	G	2015
Mike Tolbert (2)	FB	2015
Luke Kuechly (3)	LB	2015
Thomas Davis	LB	2015
Josh Norman	CB	2015
Kawann Short	DT	2015
Greg Olsen (3)	TE	2016
Mike Tolbert (3)	FB	2016
Luke Kuechly (4)	LB	2016
Trai Turner (2) *	G	2016
Thomas Davis (2)	LB	2016
Trai Turner (3) *	G	2017
Thomas Davis (3) *	LB	2017
Luke Kuechly (5)	LB	2017
Graham Gano *	K	2017
Trai Turner (4)	G	2018
Kawann Short (2) *	DT	2018
Luke Kuechly (6)	LB	2018
Luke Kuechly (7)	LB	2019
Christian McCaffrey	RB	2019
Trai Turner (5) *	G	2019
* INJURY REPLACEMENT PLAYER
