= 2009 Pro Bowl =

National Football League all-star game

2009 NFL Pro Bowl
NFC	AFC
30	21
Head coach: Andy Reid (Philadelphia Eagles)	Head coach: John Harbaugh (Baltimore Ravens)
	1	2	3	4	Total
NFC	0	10	7	13	30
AFC	7	7	0	7	21
- Date: February 8, 2009
- Stadium: Aloha Stadium; Honolulu, Hawaii
- MVP: Larry Fitzgerald (Arizona Cardinals)
- Referee: Scott Green
- Attendance: 49,958

Ceremonies
- National anthem: David Archuleta
- Halftime show: Ciara

TV in the United States
- Network: NBC
- Announcers: Al Michaels, Cris Collinsworth, Andrea Kremer, and Tiki Barber

The 2009 Pro Bowl was the National Football League's all-star game for the 2008 season. It was played at Aloha Stadium in Honolulu, Hawaii on February 8, 2009. The NFC defeated the AFC, 30–21. The AFC was coached by Baltimore's John Harbaugh, while the NFC's coach was Philadelphia's Andy Reid. This became the last Pro Bowl to be held on the weekend after the Super Bowl, the last game where the coaching staffs were from the teams who lost their conference title games, and the last game where players of the two teams competing in the Super Bowl played in the Pro Bowl.

== AFC roster ==
=== Offense ===
Position	Starter(s)	Reserve(s)	Alternate(s)
Quarterback	18 Peyton Manning, Indianapolis	4 Brett Favre, N.Y. Jets^{[b]} 6 Jay Cutler, Denver	5 Kerry Collins, Tennessee^{[a]}^{[e]}
Running back	20 Thomas Jones, N.Y. Jets	28 Chris Johnson, Tennessee^{[b]} 23 Ronnie Brown, Miami	23 Marshawn Lynch, Buffalo^{[a]}
Fullback	33 Le'Ron McClain, Baltimore		
Wide receiver	80 Andre Johnson, Houston; 15 Brandon Marshall, Denver	87 Reggie Wayne, Indianapolis; 83 Wes Welker, New England	
Tight end	88 Tony Gonzalez, Kansas City	85 Antonio Gates, San Diego^{[b]}	81 Owen Daniels, Houston^{[a]}
Offensive tackle	73 Joe Thomas, Cleveland; 71 Jason Peters, Buffalo^{[b]}	71 Michael Roos, Tennessee^{[c]}	77 Jake Long, Miami^{[a]}
Offensive guard	66 Alan Faneca, N.Y. Jets; 68 Kris Dielman, San Diego	54 Brian Waters, Kansas City	
Center	68 Kevin Mawae, Tennessee^{[b]}	74 Nick Mangold, N.Y. Jets^{[c]}	62 Casey Wiegmann, Denver^{[a]}

=== Defense ===
Position	Starter(s)	Reserve(s)	Alternate(s)
Defensive end	90 Mario Williams, Houston; 93 Dwight Freeney, Indianapolis	98 Robert Mathis, Indianapolis	
Defensive tackle	92 Albert Haynesworth, Tennessee; 77 Kris Jenkins, N.Y. Jets	92 Shaun Rogers, Cleveland	
Outside linebacker	92 James Harrison, Pittsburgh; 55 Joey Porter, Miami	55 Terrell Suggs, Baltimore	
Inside linebacker	52 Ray Lewis, Baltimore	51 James Farrior, Pittsburgh	
Cornerback	21 Nnamdi Asomugha, Oakland; 31 Cortland Finnegan, Tennessee	24 Darrelle Revis, N.Y. Jets	
Free safety	20 Ed Reed, Baltimore^{[b]}	24 Chris Hope, Tennessee^{[c]}^{[f]}	33 Michael Griffin, Tennessee^{[a]}
Strong safety	43 Troy Polamalu, Pittsburgh		

=== Special teams ===
Position:	Player:
Punter	9 Shane Lechler, Oakland
Placekicker	3 Stephen Gostkowski, New England
Kick returner	29 Leon Washington, N.Y. Jets
Special teamer	51 Brendon Ayanbadejo, Baltimore
Long snapper	64 Ryan Pontbriand, Cleveland^{[d]}

== NFC roster ==
=== Offense ===
Position	Starter(s)	Reserve(s)	Alternate(s)
Quarterback	13 Kurt Warner, Arizona	9 Drew Brees, New Orleans; 10 Eli Manning, N.Y. Giants	
Running back	28 Adrian Peterson, Minnesota	33 Michael Turner, Atlanta; 26 Clinton Portis, Washington	
Fullback	45 Mike Sellers, Washington		
Wide receiver	11 Larry Fitzgerald, Arizona; 81 Anquan Boldin, Arizona	89 Steve Smith, Carolina; 84 Roddy White, Atlanta	
Tight end	82 Jason Witten, Dallas	47 Chris Cooley, Washington	
Offensive tackles	69 Jordan Gross, Carolina; 71 Walter Jones, Seattle^{[b]}	60 Chris Samuels, Washington^{[b]}	76 Flozell Adams, Dallas^{[a]}^{[c]} 70 Jammal Brown, New Orleans^{[a]}
Offensive guards	76 Steve Hutchinson, Minnesota; 76 Chris Snee, N.Y. Giants	70 Leonard Davis, Dallas^{[b]}	75 Davin Joseph, Tampa Bay^{[a]}
Center	65 Andre Gurode, Dallas	60 Shaun O'Hara, N.Y. Giants	

=== Defense ===
Position	Starter(s)	Reserve(s)	Alternate(s)
Defensive ends	90 Julius Peppers, Carolina; 91 Justin Tuck, N.Y. Giants	69 Jared Allen, Minnesota	
Defensive tackles	93 Kevin Williams, Minnesota; 90 Jay Ratliff, Dallas	94 Pat Williams, Minnesota	
Outside linebacker	94 DeMarcus Ware, Dallas; 55 Lance Briggs, Chicago	55 Derrick Brooks, Tampa Bay^{[b]}	98 Julian Peterson, Seattle^{[a]}
Inside linebacker	52 Patrick Willis, San Francisco	52 Jon Beason, Carolina	
Cornerback	21 Charles Woodson, Green Bay^{[b]} 26 Antoine Winfield, Minnesota	22 Asante Samuel, Philadelphia^{[b]}	20 Ronde Barber, Tampa Bay^{[a]}^{[c]} 31 Al Harris, Green Bay^{[a]}
Free safety	36 Nick Collins, Green Bay	20 Brian Dawkins, Philadelphia	
Strong safety	24 Adrian Wilson, Arizona		

=== Special teams ===
Position:	Starter:
Punter	18 Jeff Feagles, N.Y. Giants
Placekicker	5 John Carney, N.Y. Giants
Kick returner	22 Clifton Smith, Tampa Bay
Special teamer	87 Sean Morey, Arizona
Long snapper	51 Zak DeOssie, N.Y. Giants^{[d]}

Notes:

^{a} Replacement selection due to injury or vacancy
^{b} Injured player; selected but did not play
^{c} Replacement starter; selected as reserve
^{d} "Need player"; named by coach
^{e} Philip Rivers was the first alternate, but declined due to injury
^{f} Hope was selected as strong safety

== Number of selections per team ==
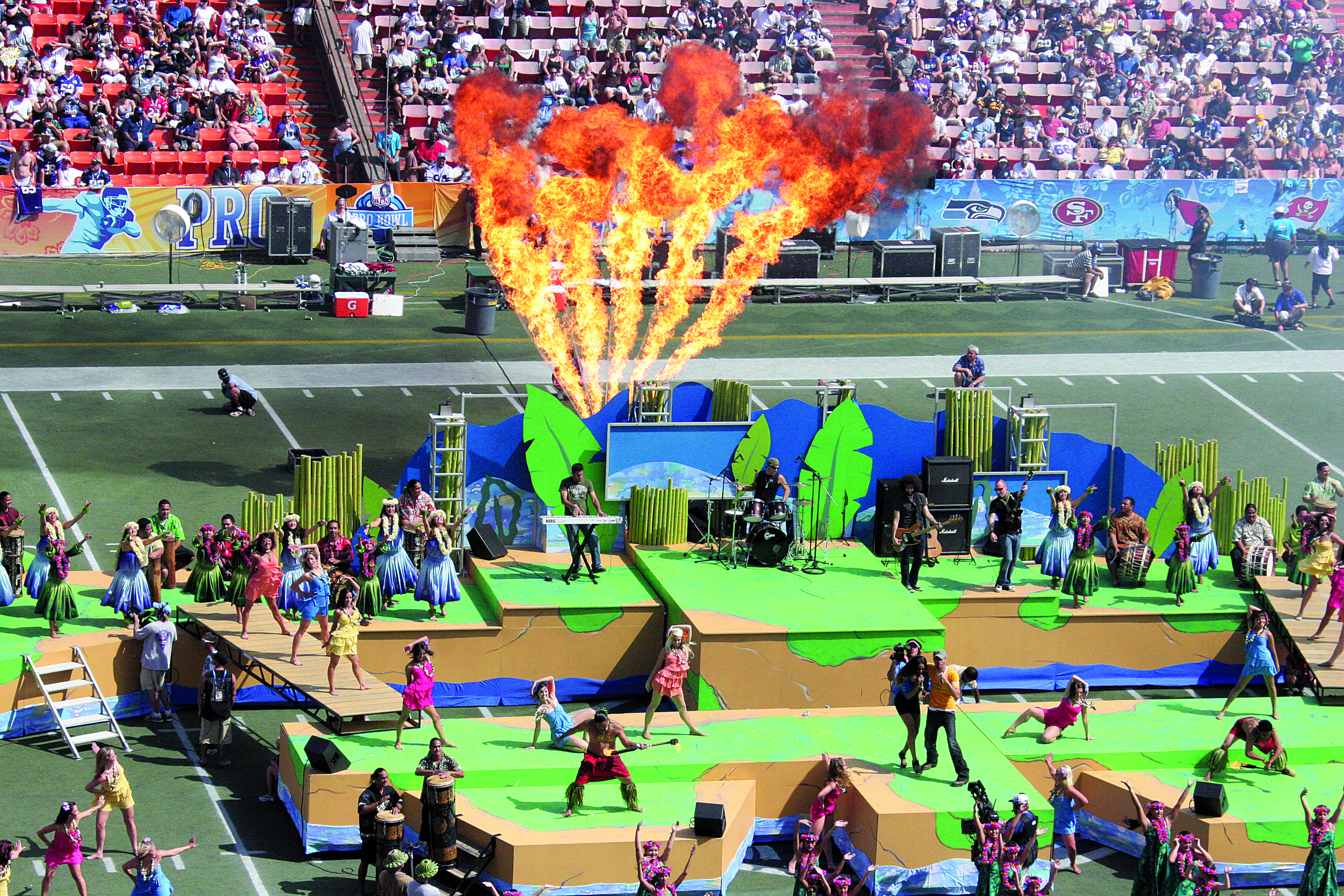
The game's halftime show

AFC team	Selections	NFC team	Selections
Tennessee Titans	8	New York Giants	7
New York Jets	7	Dallas Cowboys	6
Baltimore Ravens	5	Minnesota Vikings	6
Indianapolis Colts	4	Arizona Cardinals	5
Cleveland Browns	3	Carolina Panthers	4
Denver Broncos	3	Tampa Bay Buccaneers	4
Houston Texans	3	Washington Redskins	4
Miami Dolphins	3	Green Bay Packers	3
Pittsburgh Steelers	3	Atlanta Falcons	2
Buffalo Bills	2	New Orleans Saints	2
Kansas City Chiefs	2	Philadelphia Eagles	2
New England Patriots	2	Seattle Seahawks	2
Oakland Raiders	2	Chicago Bears	1
San Diego Chargers	2	San Francisco 49ers	1
Cincinnati Bengals	0	Detroit Lions	0
Jacksonville Jaguars	0	St. Louis Rams	0
