= Rick Sherrod =

American football player (born 1979)

No. 21
- Position: Defensive back

Personal information
- Born: January 19, 1979 (age 47); Charleston, West Virginia
- Listed height: 6 ft 3 in (1.91 m)
- Listed weight: 190 lb (86 kg)

Career information
- College: West Virginia

Career history
- New Orleans Saints (2002); Dallas Cowboys (2003); Jacksonville Jaguars (2003); Columbus Destroyers (2005–2006)

Rick Sherrod (born January 19, 1979) is an American former football free safety for the Columbus Destroyers and collegiately for the West Virginia Mountaineers. He also played in the NFL with the New Orleans Saints, Jacksonville Jaguars, and Dallas Cowboys.

== College career ==
Rick Sherrod enrolled at West Virginia University in 1998. He played sparingly his freshman season, totaling only one tackle.

As a sophomore, 1999, Sherrod totaled 24 tackles on the season. He also tied a career-high two pass break-ups against Rutgers.

In 2000, as a junior, Sherrod started at free safety beside strong safety Shawn Shawn Hackett under defensive backs coach David Lockwood. Sherrod totaled 104 tackles and a career-high 3 interceptions. He also recorded two fumble recoveries and 12 pass break-ups. His best game came against Idaho, when he recorded a career-high 13 solo tackles.

In 2001, as a senior, Rick Sherrod totaled a career-high 156 tackles and an interception. He also forced two fumbles and recovered a fumble to go along with his 5 tackles for a loss. Sherrod also had a career-high 18 tackles against Virginia Tech. His 15.6 tackles-per-game average set the NCAA Football Bowl Subdivision (FBS) single-season record which stood until 2011 when it was broken by Luke Kuechly. He was named second-team All-Big East at the conclusion of the season.

Sherrod finished his career with 287 tackles, four interceptions and 17 pass deflections, which is tenth on the school's all-time career list. Sherrod also made at least ten tackles in 13 of his 25 starts.

== Professional career ==
=== National Football League ===
Rick Sherrod went undrafted in the 2002 NFL draft, but was signed as a free agent by the New Orleans Saints. However, he was released on August 27, 2002, before the season began.

After being released by the Saints, Sherrod was picked up by the Dallas Cowboys. Sherrod saw no game time however, and was cut on June 5, 2003.

Sherrod signed with the Jacksonville Jaguars in July, 2003, but was released shortly after.

=== Columbus Destroyers ===
Following his stint in the NFL, Sherrod moved on to the Arena Football League. He was signed by the Columbus Destroyers on May 13, 2005. Sherrod played one season with the Destroyers, then was cut on January 9, 2006.
