= Kris Dielman =

American football player (born 1981)

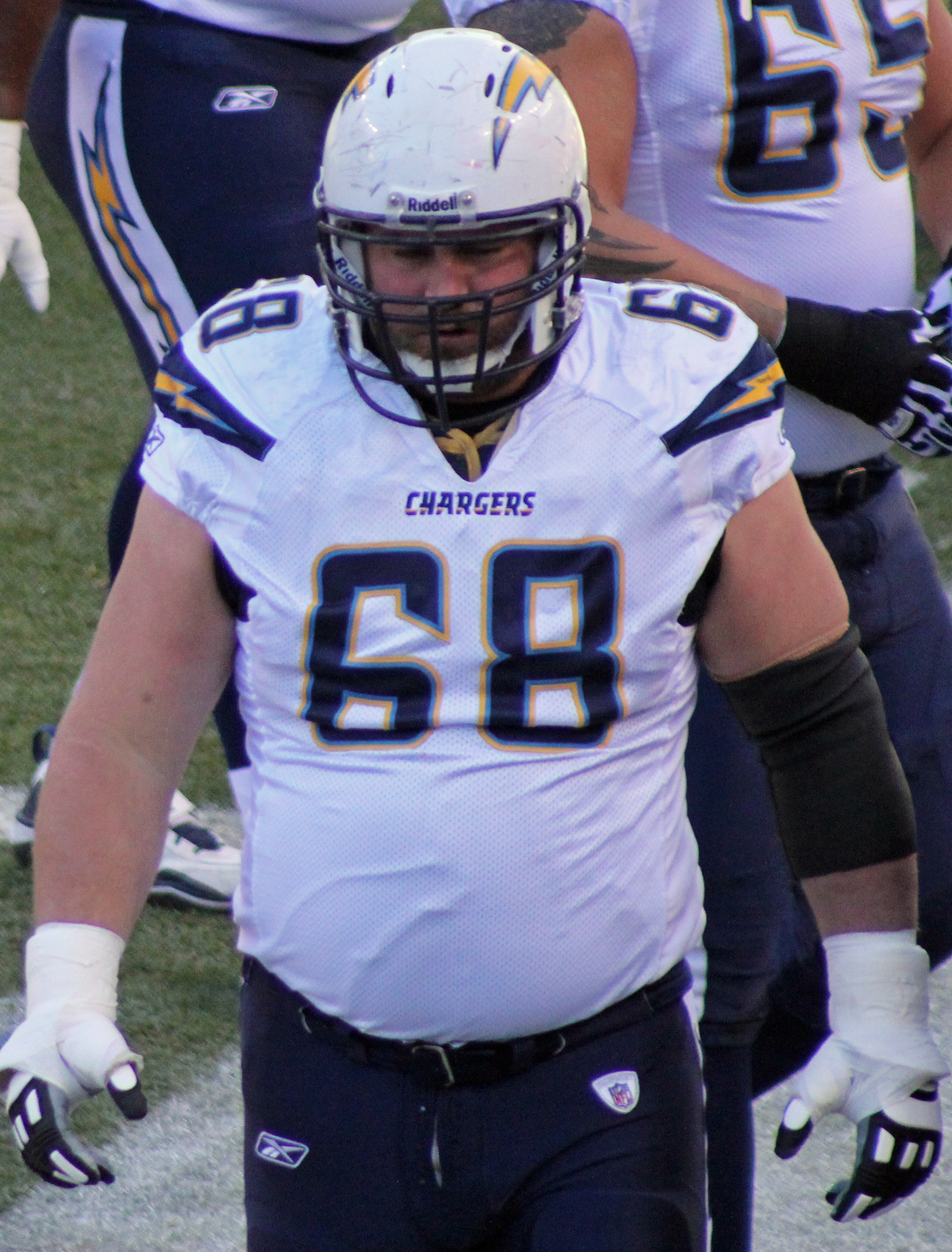
- Dielman with the San Diego Chargers in 2011

No. 68
- Position: Guard

Personal information
- Born: February 3, 1981 (age 45); Goshen, Indiana, U.S.
- Listed height: 6 ft 4 in (1.93 m)
- Listed weight: 320 lb (145 kg)

Career information
- High school: Troy (Troy, Ohio)
- College: Indiana
- NFL draft: 2003: undrafted

Career history
- San Diego Chargers (2003–2011)

Awards and highlights
- 2× Second-team All-Pro (2008, 2009); 4× Pro Bowl (2007–2010); San Diego Chargers 50th Anniversary Team

Career NFL statistics
- Games played: 120
- Games started: 97
- Stats at Pro Football Reference

Kristopher M. Dielman (born February 3, 1981) is an American former professional football player who was a guard for the San Diego Chargers of the National Football League (NFL) for nine seasons. He played college football for Indiana University. The Chargers signed him as an undrafted free agent in 2003, and he played his entire professional career for the Chargers. He was selected to the Pro Bowl four times, and was a member of the Chargers 50th Anniversary Team.

== Early life ==
A graduate of Troy High School in Troy, Ohio, Dielman was an all-state and all-conference linebacker and tight end. He also lettered in basketball. Off the field, Dielman was both homecoming and mid-winter king at Troy High School.

== College career ==
After graduating from high school, he enrolled at Indiana University where he played for the Indiana Hoosiers football team. Kris played tight end for Indiana under former San Diego Chargers offensive coordinator Cam Cameron and former Chargers offensive line coach Hal Hunter, and earned All-Big 10 honors his junior year. Dielman's blocking was a huge contribution to the success of then-IU quarterback Antwaan Randle El, who became the first player in the history of NCAA football with 8,000 pass yards and 3,000 rush yards in Dielman's junior season. Cameron was Dielman's head coach and Hunter was his offensive coordinator. Once Cameron got a job as the Charger offensive coordinator, Hunter left for North Carolina. Dielman's new coaching staff started playing him more at defensive line, a position he had experience throughout his college career and where he later became a team captain during his senior season.

== Professional career ==
Pre-draft measurables
Height	Weight
6 ft 3 1/4 in (1.91 m)	283 lb (128 kg)
Values from Pro Day

Dielman went undrafted out of college, but signed on with the San Diego Chargers on April 28, 2003. Dielman reunited with his former Indiana head coach Cam Cameron, who served as the Chargers' offensive coordinator.

The Chargers converted him from a defensive tackle to an offensive lineman, and before long Dielman had established himself as a starter at left guard. Right away Dielman made a name for himself in large part due to his gritty, hard-nosed style of play on the offensive line.

He was released by the Chargers on Aug 26 at the roster cut down to 65 before being re-signed to the practice squad on Sept. 1. He was then called up to the active roster with six weeks left in the season.

By his fourth year in the league, Dielman was a rising star and an integral part of LaDainian Tomlinson's record breaking 2006 season. Dielman's teammates referred to him as their "enforcer" and "battering ram". Dielman was chosen as a 1st Alternate for the 2007 Pro Bowl.

In the off-season the Seattle Seahawks offered him a large contract worth $48.2 million but he returned to San Diego to sign a six-year deal with the Chargers that guarantees him $17 million over the first two years and is potentially worth $39 million, becoming one of the highest paid guards in the NFL.

In an interview with USA Today's Jim Corbett, Charger general manager A. J. Smith remarked, "He's a special kid. The loyalty he showed is very, very rare. I knew if he could just be paid like a premier guard, he would stay with us because of who he is. Seattle was legitimate, and he didn't want any part of it. He said, 'I want to go home with my team.' It's the best thing in the world to happen for us. He's a Pro Bowler waiting to happen."

In 2009, he started all 16 games for just the second time in his career and earned his third Pro Bowl invite despite allowing a career-high three sacks. He was penalized just three times on the season, the lowest total since he moved into the starting lineup in 2005.

In December 2010, Dielman was selected as a Pro Bowl starter for the second time, his fourth Pro Bowl overall. Dielman suffered a concussion in the sixth game of the 2011 season against the New York Jets. He had a seizure on the team plane after the game, and he missed the remainder of the season. In February 2012, Dielman announced his retirement from pro football due to the risk of further head injuries. On July 21, 2012, the San Diego Chargers released Dielman from the team's reserved-retired list by the request of his agent.
