= Trai Turner =

American football player (born 1993)

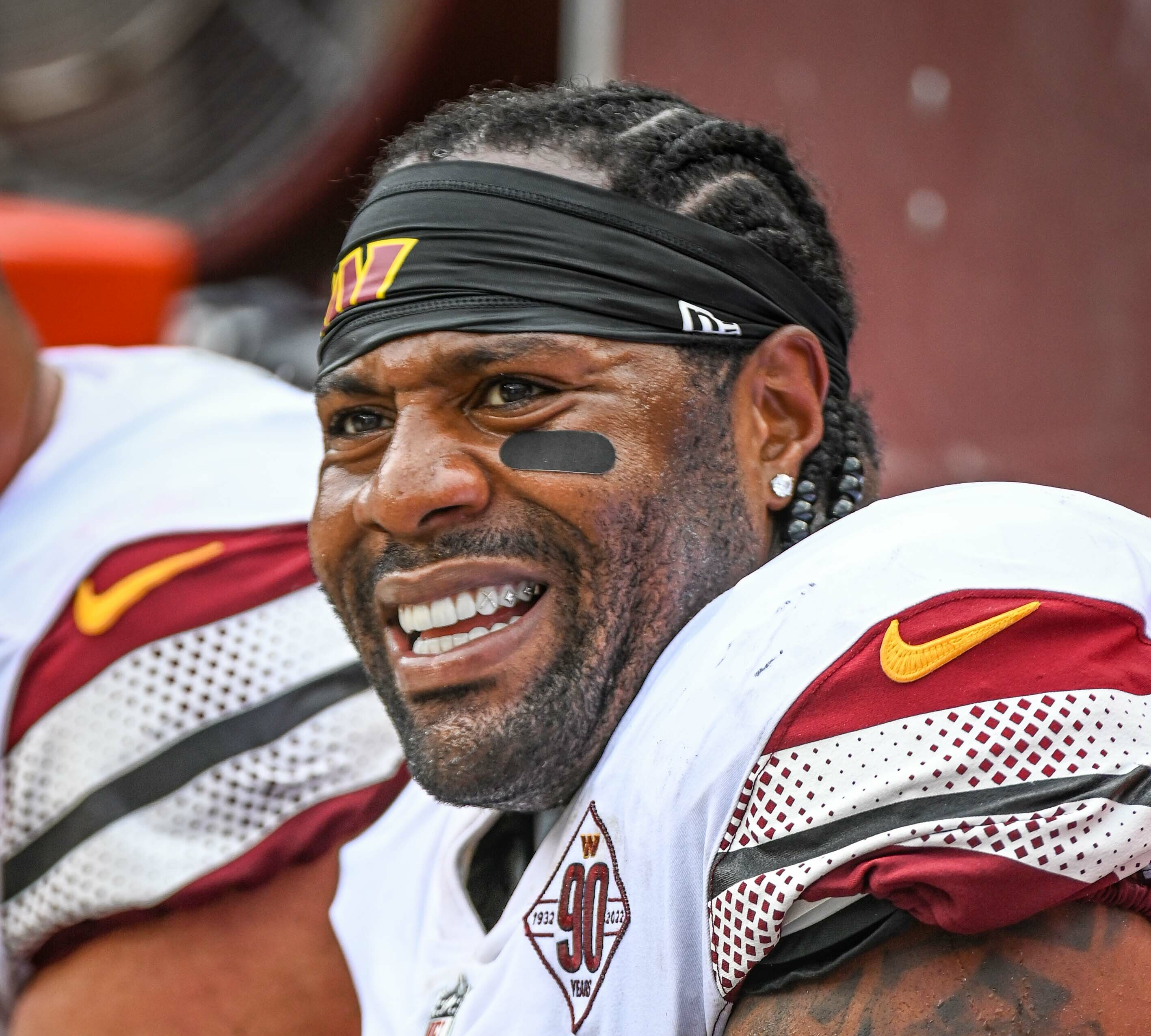
- Turner with the Washington Commanders in 2022

No. 51, 53, 70
- Position: Offensive guard

Personal information
- Born: June 14, 1993 (age 33); New Orleans, Louisiana, U.S.
- Listed height: 6 ft 3 in (1.91 m)
- Listed weight: 320 lb (145 kg)

Career information
- High school: St. Augustine (New Orleans)
- College: LSU (2011–2013)
- NFL draft: 2014: 3rd round, 92nd overall pick

Career history
- Carolina Panthers (2014–2019); Los Angeles Chargers (2020); Pittsburgh Steelers (2021); Washington Commanders (2022); New Orleans Saints (2023)

Awards and highlights
- 5× Pro Bowl (2015–2019); Second-team All-SEC (2013)

Career NFL statistics
- Games played: 126
- Games started: 118
- Stats at Pro Football Reference

Trai Denzell Turner (born June 14, 1993) is an American former professional football offensive guard. He played college football for the LSU Tigers and was selected by the Carolina Panthers in the third round of the 2014 NFL draft, where he made the Pro Bowl every year from 2015 to 2019. Turner has also played for the Los Angeles Chargers, Pittsburgh Steelers, and Washington Commanders.

== Early life ==
Turner attended St. Augustine High School in New Orleans, Louisiana. He played offensive tackle for their football team, helping St. Augustine average over 300 yards rushing a game.

College recruiting
Name	Hometown	School	Height	Weight	40^{‡}	Commit date
Trai Turner; OG	New Orleans, LA	St. Augustine	6 ft 5 in (1.96 m)	345 lb (156 kg)	5.10	Feb 2, 2011
Trai Turner; OG	Recruit ratings: Scout: Rivals: 247Sports: (76)					
Overall recruit ranking: Scout: 16 (OG) Rivals: 14 (OG), 13 (LA) ESPN: 49 (DE)
‡ Refers to 40-yard dash; Note: In many cases, Scout, Rivals, 247Sports, On3, and ESPN may conflict in their listings of height, weight and 40 time.; In these cases, the average was taken. ESPN grades are on a 100-point scale.; Sources: "2011 LSU Football Commitments". Rivals.; "2011 LSU Football Recruiting Commits". Scout.; "ESPN". ESPN.; "Scout.com Team Recruiting Rankings". Scout.; "2011 Team Ranking". Rivals.com.

== College career ==
Turner attended Louisiana State University (LSU) from 2011 to 2013. After redshirting as a freshman in 2011, he played in 12 games and made seven starts as a redshirt freshman. He made his first start at right guard in a win over number 3 ranked South Carolina. In 559 snaps, Turner finished second on the team with 51 pancake blocks. LSU had a 100-yard rusher from four of the seven games in which Turner started. In his redshirt sophomore year, Turner started and played in all 13 games.

In his final collegiate game at the 2014 Outback Bowl, Turner registered a season-high 10 pancake blocks and helped pave the way for 220 rushing yards against Iowa in a win. For his career, Turner played a total of 1,416 snaps with 115 pancake blocks. He opted to forgo final two years of eligibility at LSU and entered into the 2014 NFL draft after his sophomore season.

== Professional career ==
Pre-draft measurables
Height	Weight	Arm length	Hand span	40-yard dash	10-yard split	20-yard split	20-yard shuttle	Three-cone drill	Vertical jump	Broad jump	Bench press
6 ft 2 5/8 in (1.90 m)	310 lb (141 kg)	34 in (0.86 m)	9 1/2 in (0.24 m)	4.93 s	1.80 s	2.89 s	4.77 s	8.16 s	27.5 in (0.70 m)	8 ft 6 in (2.59 m)	25 reps
All values from NFL Combine/Pro Day

=== Carolina Panthers ===
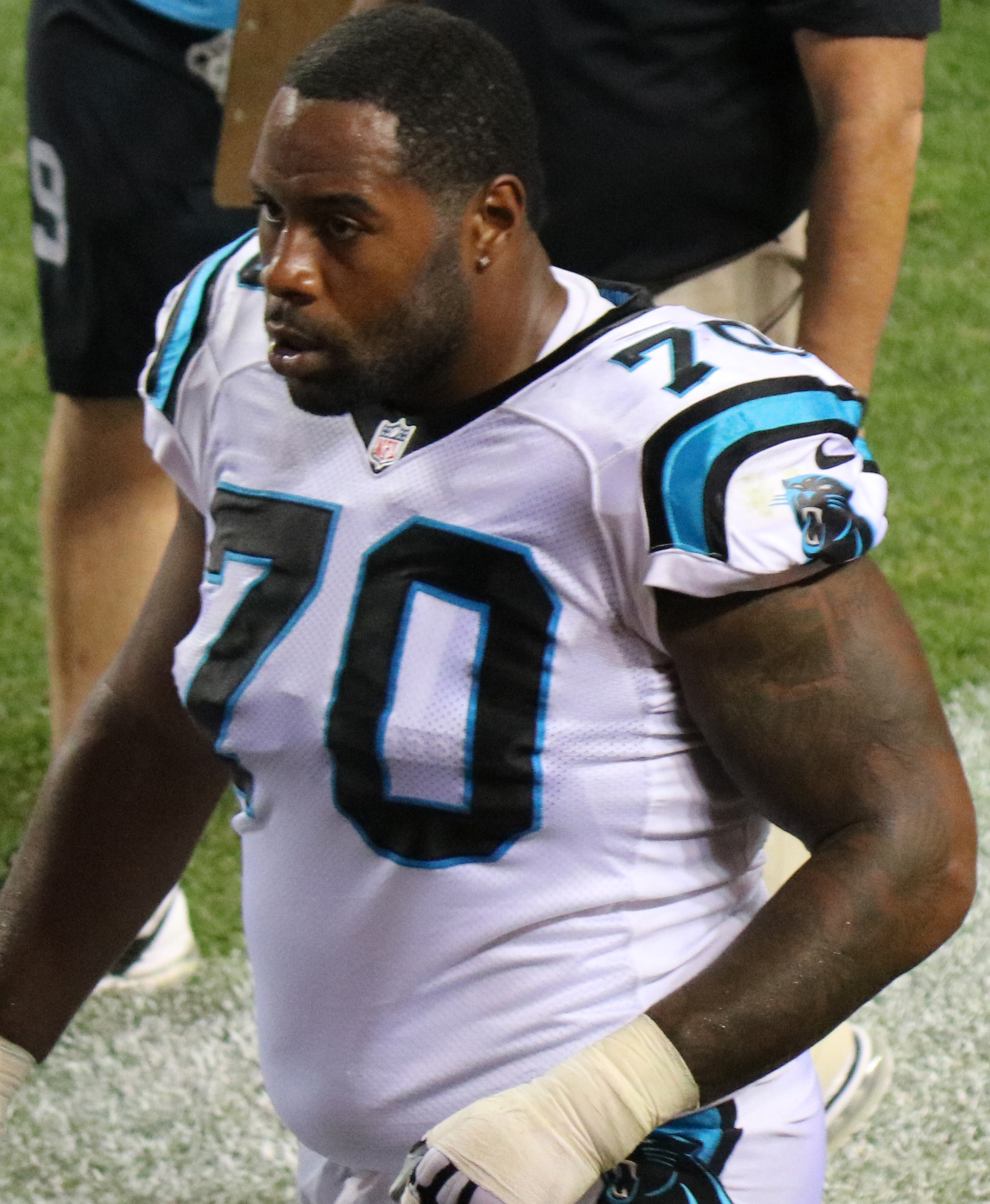
Turner playing for the Carolina Panthers in 2016

Turner was selected by the Carolina Panthers in the third round (92nd overall) of the 2014 NFL draft. On June 4, 2014, Turner signed a four-year contract. As a rookie, during the preseason, Turner won the starting right guard position on the Panther offensive line over veteran Chris Scott. Turner made his NFL debut on September 7, 2014, in Carolina's 20–14 win over the Tampa Bay Buccaneers. Turner made his first NFL start during the Panthers week 5 victory over the Chicago Bears. His emergence into the starting lineup helped the Panthers rank seventh in the NFL in rushing, including a league-leading 975 yards over the last five games. On December 23, 2014, Turner was named to Sports Illustrated All-Rookie Team. Through 618 snaps in the season, Turner did not allow a single sack and Turner surrendered just 11 quarterback disruptions.

Through the first three games of the 2015 season, he did not allow a sack and surrendered just three quarterback pressures. Turner had not allowed a sack for the past 627 snaps, the third-longest streak in the NFL at left guard. Turner was selected for his first career Pro Bowl during the season. On September 6, 2016, Turner became the first solo offensive lineman since Nate Newton to appear on the cover of Sports Illustrated. Turner played in Super Bowl 50.

Turner started all 16 games in 2016, earning his second consecutive Pro Bowl. On July 20, 2017, Turner signed a four-year, $45 million contract extension with $20.5 million guaranteed. He started 13 games in 2017 before missing the final three games with a concussion. He returned in the wild card round of the playoffs, playing in every offensive snap as the Panthers lost 31–26 to the Saints. Turner was named to his third straight Pro Bowl as an injury replacement. Turner started 13 games in 2018, missing Week 2 and 3 with a concussion and Week 17 with an ankle injury. He also was named to his fourth straight Pro Bowl. He started 13 games in 2019, missing three due to injury. Furthermore, Turner was named to his fifth straight Pro Bowl.

=== Los Angeles Chargers ===
Turner was traded to the Los Angeles Chargers in exchange for Russell Okung on March 18, 2020. He started nine games at right guard before being released on March 12, 2021.

=== Pittsburgh Steelers ===
Turner signed a one-year, $3 million contract with the Pittsburgh Steelers on June 25, 2021.

=== Washington Commanders ===
Turner signed a one-year contract with the Washington Commanders on May 3, 2022. He was named the starting right guard by the start of the 2022 season. In Week 4, Turner was benched in favor of Saahdiq Charles with head coach Ron Rivera stating "Trai isn't quite where he needs to be yet" following the end of the game. After playing in a reserve role for three games straight, Turner returned as a starter in Week 8.

=== New Orleans Saints ===
On July 25, 2023, Turner signed a one-year deal with the New Orleans Saints. He suffered a torn quad three days later and was ruled out for the season. He was placed on injured reserve three days later.
