= 2008 All-Pro Team =

Official list of the best NFL players in 2008

The 2008 All-Pro teams were named by the Associated Press (AP), Pro Football Writers of America (PFWA), and The Sporting News (TSN) for performance in the 2008 NFL season. These are the current teams that historically appear in Total Football: The Official Encyclopedia of the NFL. Although the NFL has no official awards, according to the NFL spokesman Greg Aiello, the NFL Record and Fact Book has historically listed All-Pro teams from major news sources such as the Associated Press, Sporting News, Pro Football Writers Association, as well as teams from organizations that no longer release All-Pro teams such as Newspaper Enterprise Association and United Press International.

The AP team is selected by a national panel of 50 media members, and it lists both first and second teams. The Sporting News surveyed 664 players, coaches, and general managers to determine its All-Pro team. The Pro Football Writers Association's All-NFL team results from the votes of over 300 members as well as from the editors and writers of Pro Football Weekly, who present the PFWA awards.

== Teams ==
Offense
Position	First team	Second team
Quarterback	Peyton Manning, Indianapolis Colts (AP, PFWA); Drew Brees, New Orleans Saints (SN)	Drew Brees, New Orleans Saints (AP-2)
Running back	Adrian Peterson, Minnesota Vikings (AP, PFWA, SN); Michael Turner, Atlanta Falcons (AP, PFWA, SN)	Clinton Portis, Washington Redskins (AP-2); DeAngelo Williams, Carolina Panthers (AP-2)
Fullback^{[a]}	Le'Ron McClain, Baltimore Ravens (AP)	Madison Hedgecock, New York Giants (AP-2)
Wide receiver	Andre Johnson, Houston Texans (AP, PFWA, SN); Larry Fitzgerald, Arizona Cardinals (AP, PFWA, SN)	Steve Smith, Carolina Panthers (AP-2); Wes Welker, New England Patriots (AP-2)
Tight end	Tony Gonzalez, Kansas City Chiefs (AP, PFWA, SN)	Jason Witten, Dallas Cowboys (AP-2)
Tackle	Michael Roos, Tennessee Titans (AP, PFWA, SN); Jordan Gross, Carolina Panthers (AP, PFWA, SN)	Walter Jones, Seattle Seahawks (AP-2); Ryan Clady, Denver Broncos (AP-2t); Joe Thomas, Cleveland Browns (AP-2t); David Stewart, Tennessee Titans (AP-2t); David Diehl, New York Giants (AP-2t); Jason Peters, Buffalo Bills (AP-2t)
Guard	Chris Snee, New York Giants (AP, PFWA, SN); Steve Hutchinson, Minnesota Vikings (AP, PFWA, SN)	Kris Dielman, San Diego Chargers (AP-2); Alan Faneca, New York Jets (AP-2)
Center	Kevin Mawae, Tennessee Titans (AP, PFWA); Shaun O'Hara, New York Giants (SN)	Shaun O'Hara, New York Giants (AP-2)

Special teams
Position	First team	Second team
Kicker	Stephen Gostkowski, New England Patriots (AP, PFWA, SN)	John Carney, New York Giants (AP-2)
Punter	Shane Lechler, Oakland Raiders (AP, PFWA, SN)	Donnie Jones, St. Louis Rams (AP-2)
Kick returner	Leon Washington, New York Jets (AP); Danieal Manning, Chicago Bears (PFWA); Leodis McKelvin, Buffalo Bills (SN)	Clifton Smith, Tampa Bay Buccaneers (AP-2)
Punt returner^{[d]}	Johnnie Lee Higgins, Oakland Raiders (PFWA); Reggie Bush, New Orleans Saints (SN)	
Special teams^{[e]}	Brendon Ayanbadejo, Baltimore Ravens (PFWA)	

Defense
Position	First team	Second team
Defensive end	Justin Tuck, New York Giants (AP, PFWA); Jared Allen, Minnesota Vikings (AP); Mario Williams, Houston Texans (SN); Julius Peppers, Carolina Panthers (SN); John Abraham, Atlanta Falcons (PFWA)	Julius Peppers, Carolina Panthers (AP-2); John Abraham, Atlanta Falcons (AP-2)
Defensive tackle	Kevin Williams, Minnesota Vikings (AP, PFWA, SN); Albert Haynesworth, Tennessee Titans (AP, PFWA); Kris Jenkins, New York Jets (SN)	Haloti Ngata, Baltimore Ravens (AP-2); Kris Jenkins, New York Jets (AP-2)
Outside linebacker^{[b]}	DeMarcus Ware, Dallas Cowboys (AP, PFWA, SN); James Harrison, Pittsburgh Steelers (AP, PFWA, SN); Joey Porter, Miami Dolphins (SN)	Joey Porter, Miami Dolphins (AP-2); Terrell Suggs, Baltimore Ravens (AP-2)
Inside linebacker^{[b]}^{[c]}	Ray Lewis, Baltimore Ravens (AP, PFWA); Jon Beason, Carolina Panthers (AP)	Patrick Willis, San Francisco 49ers (AP-2); James Farrior, Pittsburgh Steelers (AP-2)
Cornerback	Nnamdi Asomugha, Oakland Raiders (AP, PFWA, SN); Cortland Finnegan, Tennessee Titans (AP, PFWA, SN)	Charles Woodson, Green Bay Packers (AP-2); Antoine Winfield, Minnesota Vikings (AP-2)
Safety	Ed Reed, Baltimore Ravens (AP, PFWA, SN); Troy Polamalu, Pittsburgh Steelers (AP, PFWA, SN)	Adrian Wilson, Arizona Cardinals (AP-2); Quintin Mikell, Philadelphia Eagles (AP-2t); Nick Collins, Green Bay Packers (AP-2t)

^{a} Only the AP designates fullbacks.
^{b} The Sporting News groups all linebackers together, while the AP and PFWA have separate awards for outside and inside linebackers.
^{c} The AP names two inside linebackers, while the Sporting News and PFWA name only one
^{d} The AP does not designate a punt returner.
^{e} Only PFWA designates a special teams player.

== Key ==
- AP = Associated Press first-team All-Pro
- AP-2 = Associated Press second-team All-Pro
- AP-2t = Tied for second-team All-Pro in the AP vote
- PFWA = Pro Football Writers Association All-NFL
- SN = Sporting News All-Pro
