= 2009 All-Pro Team =

Official list of the best NFL players in 2009

The 2009 All-Pro teams were named by the Associated Press (AP), Pro Football Writers of America (PFWA), and The Sporting News (TSN) for performance in the 2009 NFL season. The Associated Press and Sporting News named first and second-team selections. The AP team was selected by a national panel of 50 NFL writers. The Sporting News selection process consisted of a players' poll, making it "The Players' All-Pro Team". The PFWA All-NFL team is based on a poll of its more than 300 members.

== Teams ==
Offense
| Position | First team | Second team |
|---|---|---|
| Quarterback | Peyton Manning, Indianapolis Colts (AP, PFWA), Drew Brees, New Orleans Saints (SN) | Drew Brees, New Orleans Saints (AP-2), Peyton Manning, Indianapolis Colts (SN-2) |
| Running back | Chris Johnson, Tennessee Titans (AP, PFWA, SN); Adrian Peterson, Minnesota Vikings (AP, PFWA, SN) | Ray Rice, Baltimore Ravens (AP-2); Steven Jackson, St. Louis Rams (AP-2, SN-2); Maurice Jones-Drew, Jacksonville Jaguars (SN-2) |
| Fullback^{[a]} | Leonard Weaver, Philadelphia Eagles (AP) | Le'Ron McClain, Baltimore Ravens (AP-2) |
| Wide receiver | Wes Welker, New England Patriots (AP, PFWA); Andre Johnson, Houston Texans (AP, PFWA, SN); Larry Fitzgerald, Arizona Cardinals (SN) | Larry Fitzgerald, Arizona Cardinals (AP-2); Brandon Marshall, Denver Broncos (SN-2); Reggie Wayne, Indianapolis Colts (AP-2, SN-2) |
| Tight end | Dallas Clark, Indianapolis Colts (AP, PFWA, SN) | Antonio Gates, San Diego Chargers (AP-2); Jason Witten, Dallas Cowboys (SN-2) |
| Tackle | Joe Thomas, Cleveland Browns (AP, PFWA); Ryan Clady, Denver Broncos (AP, PFWA, SN); Jake Long, Miami Dolphins (SN) | Jake Long, Miami Dolphins (AP-2); Joe Thomas, Cleveland Browns (SN-2); Michael Roos, Tennessee Titans (AP-2, SN-2) |
| Guard | Steve Hutchinson, Minnesota Vikings (AP, PFWA, SN); Jahri Evans, New Orleans Saints (AP, PFWA, SN) | Logan Mankins, New England Patriots (AP-2, SN-2); Chris Snee, New York Giants (SN-2); Kris Dielman, San Diego Chargers (AP-2) |
| Center | Nick Mangold, New York Jets (AP, PFWA, SN) | Jeff Saturday, Indianapolis Colts (SN-2); Andre Gurode, Dallas Cowboys (AP-2) |

Special teams
| Position | First team | Second team |
|---|---|---|
| Kicker | Nate Kaeding, San Diego Chargers (AP, PFWA); David Akers, Philadelphia Eagles (SN) | Nate Kaeding, San Diego Chargers (SN-2); David Akers, Philadelphia Eagles (AP-2) |
| Punter | Shane Lechler, Oakland Raiders (AP, PFWA, SN) | Andy Lee, San Francisco 49ers (AP-2t); Donnie Jones, St. Louis Rams (AP-2t, SN-2) |
| Kick returner | Josh Cribbs, Cleveland Browns (AP, PFWA); Percy Harvin, Minnesota Vikings (SN) | Josh Cribbs, Cleveland Browns (SN-2); DeSean Jackson, Philadelphia Eagles (AP-2) |
| Punt returner^{[d]} | DeSean Jackson, Philadelphia Eagles (PFWA, SN) | Patrick Crayton, Dallas Cowboys (SN-2) |
| Special teams^{[e]} | Kassim Osgood, San Diego Chargers (PFWA) | |

Defense
| Position | First team | Second team |
|---|---|---|
| Defensive end | Dwight Freeney, Indianapolis Colts (AP, PFWA, SN); Jared Allen, Minnesota Vikings (AP, PFWA, SN) | Trent Cole, Philadelphia Eagles (AP-2, SN-2); Julius Peppers, Carolina Panthers (AP-2, SN-2) |
| Defensive tackle | Jay Ratliff, Dallas Cowboys (AP, PFWA, SN); Kevin Williams, Minnesota Vikings (AP); Darnell Dockett, Arizona Cardinals (SN); Haloti Ngata, Baltimore Ravens (PFWA) | Vince Wilfork, New England Patriots (SN-2); Darnell Dockett, Arizona Cardinals (AP-2); Haloti Ngata, Baltimore Ravens (AP-2, SN-2) |
| Outside linebacker^{[b]} | Elvis Dumervil, Denver Broncos (AP, PFWA, SN); DeMarcus Ware, Dallas Cowboys (AP, PFWA, SN) | Lance Briggs, Chicago Bears (AP-2t^{[c]}); LaMarr Woodley, Pittsburgh Steelers (AP-2); James Harrison, Pittsburgh Steelers (AP-2t,^{[c]} SN-2); Brian Cushing^{[c]}, Houston Texans (SN-2) |
| Inside linebacker^{[b]} | Patrick Willis, San Francisco 49ers (AP, PFWA, SN); Ray Lewis, Baltimore Ravens (AP) | David Harris, New York Jets (AP-2); Jon Beason, Carolina Panthers (AP-2, SN-2) |
| Cornerback | Darrelle Revis, New York Jets (AP, PFWA, SN); Charles Woodson, Green Bay Packers (AP, PFWA, SN) | Asante Samuel, Philadelphia Eagles (AP-2, SN-2); Leon Hall, Cincinnati Bengals (AP-2t); Nnamdi Asomugha, Oakland Raiders (AP-2t, SN-2) |
| Safety | Darren Sharper, New Orleans Saints (AP, PFWA, SN); Adrian Wilson, Arizona Cardinals (AP, PFWA); Brian Dawkins, Denver Broncos (SN) | Brian Dawkins, Denver Broncos (AP-2); Jairus Byrd, Buffalo Bills (SN-2); Ed Reed, Baltimore Ravens (AP-2t, SN-2); Nick Collins, Green Bay Packers (AP-2t) |

^{a} Only the AP designates fullbacks.
^{b} The Sporting News groups all linebackers together and names three total, the PFWA names two outside and one inside (middle) linebacker (as in a 4-3 defense), while the AP designates two outside and two inside linebackers.
^{c} Cushing was originally named as a second-team outside linebacker by the AP along with Lamar Woodley. When it was disclosed several months after the voting was completed that he had failed a drug test administered during the season the AP decided to re-open voting at the position. Cushing was named on only one ballot in the re-vote, down from 5 votes he originally received. James Harrison and Lance Briggs replaced Cushing.
^{d} The AP does not designate a punt returner.
^{e} Only PFWA designates a special teams player.

== Key ==
- AP = Associated Press first-team All-Pro
- AP-2 = Associated Press second-team All-Pro
- PFWA = Pro Football Writers Association All-NFL
- SN = Sporting News All-Pro
- SN-2 = Sporting News All-Pro second-team
