= Luke Kuechly =

American football player (born 1991)

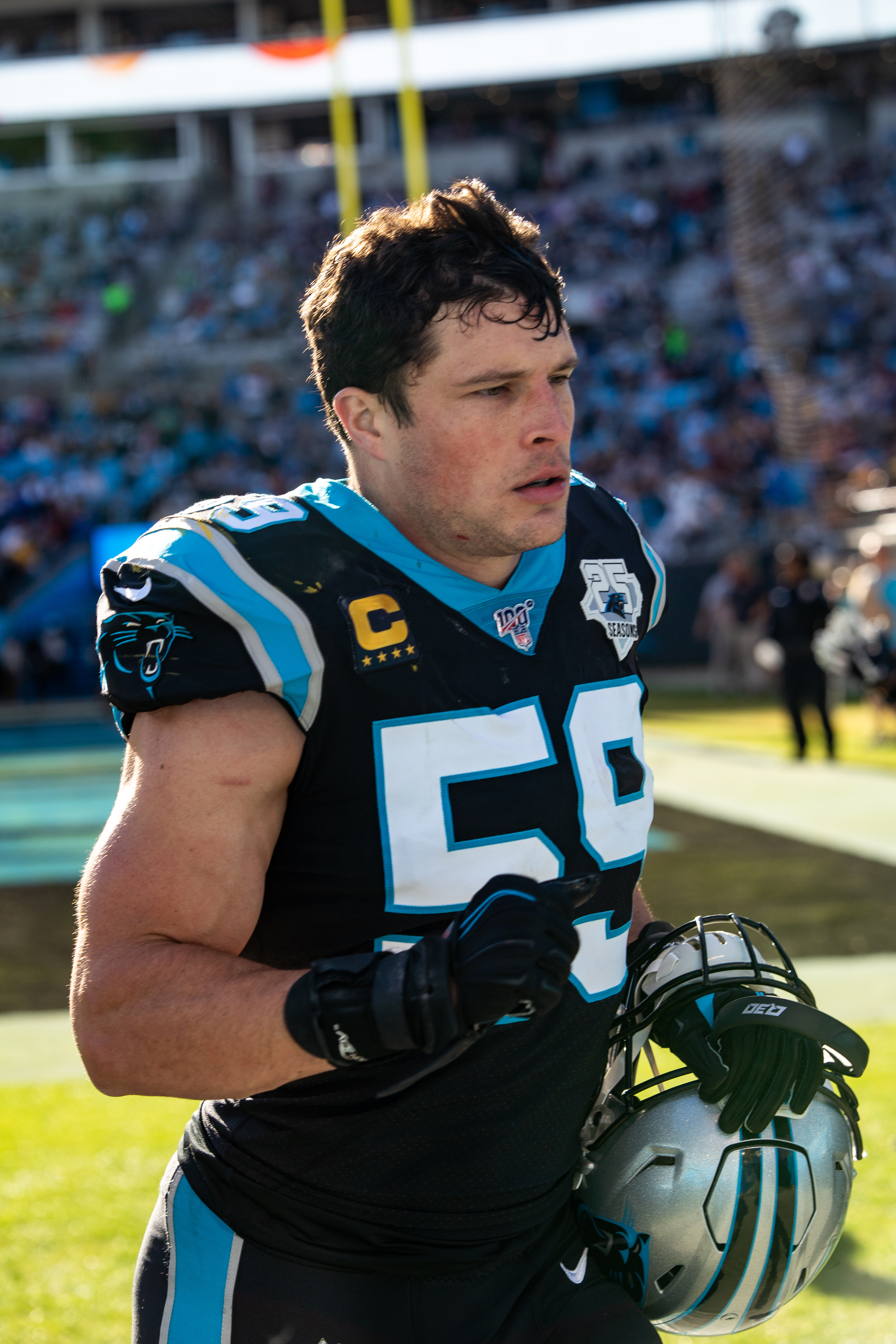
- Kuechly with the Carolina Panthers in 2019

No. 59
- Position: Linebacker

Personal information
- Born: April 20, 1991 (age 35); Cincinnati, Ohio, U.S.
- Listed height: 6 ft 3 in (1.91 m)
- Listed weight: 238 lb (108 kg)

Career information
- High school: St. Xavier (Cincinnati)
- College: Boston College (2009–2011)
- NFL draft: 2012: 1st round, 9th overall pick

Career history

Playing
- Carolina Panthers (2012–2019)

Operations
- Carolina Panthers (2020–2021) Pro scout

Awards and highlights
- NFL Defensive Player of the Year (2013); NFL Defensive Rookie of the Year (2012); 5× First-team All-Pro (2013–2015, 2017, 2018); 2× Second-team All-Pro (2016, 2019); 7× Pro Bowl (2013–2019); 2× NFL combined tackles leader (2012, 2014); NFL 2010s All-Decade Team; 3× Butkus Award (pro) (2014, 2015, 2017); PFWA All-Rookie Team (2012); Bronko Nagurski Trophy (2011); Lombardi Award (2011); Lott Trophy (2011); Butkus Award (college) (2011); Jack Lambert Trophy (2011); Unanimous All-American (2010); Consensus All-American (2011); 2× NCAA combined combined tackles leader (2010, 2011); 2× NCAA solo tackles leader (2010, 2011); ACC Athlete of the Year (2012); ACC Defensive Player of the Year (2011); ACC Defensive Rookie of the Year (2009); 3× First-team All-ACC (2009–2011); Boston College Eagles Jersey No. 40 retired; NFL records: Most combined tackles in a game: 24 (tied); NCAA records: Most combined tackles in a season: 191 (2011)

Career NFL statistics
- Total tackles: 1,092
- Sacks: 12.5
- Interceptions: 18
- Pass deflections: 66
- Forced fumbles: 7
- Fumble recoveries: 9
- Defensive touchdowns: 2
- Stats at Pro Football Reference
- Pro Football Hall of Fame
- College Football Hall of Fame

Luke August Kuechly (/ˈkiːkli/ KEEK-lee; born April 20, 1991) is an American former professional football linebacker who played in the National Football League (NFL) for eight seasons with the Carolina Panthers. Kuechly played college football for the Boston College Eagles, twice earning consensus All-American honors. He was selected by the Panthers ninth overall in the 2012 NFL draft.

Kuechly had an immediate impact during his rookie season, as he led the NFL in tackles and won the Associated Press 2012 NFL Defensive Rookie of the Year award, becoming the third youngest recipient in its history. In 2013, Kuechly became the youngest recipient of the AP NFL Defensive Player of the Year Award in its history.

After retiring following the 2019 season, Kuechly spent two seasons with the Panthers as a pro scout. He was inducted to the Pro Football Hall of Fame in 2026.

== Early life ==
Kuechly was born on April 20, 1991, in Cincinnati, Ohio, and grew up in Evendale, Ohio. He attended St. Xavier High School in the Finneytown area of Cincinnati, where he played linebacker and safety for the football team. As a junior in 2007 he had 147 tackles, six sacks, two forced fumbles, three fumble recoveries, two interceptions, and a touchdown as a linebacker. He helped his team go 15–0, winning the Division 1 Ohio state title, and finishing at the top of several national polls (Calpreps.com and Prepnation.com) as the best high school team in America. As a senior in 2008, he had 130 tackles, a sack, three forced fumbles, two fumble recoveries and an interception. Kuechly was a two-time All Greater Catholic League selection at St. Xavier, gaining first-team honors in 2008.

Regarded as a three-star recruit, Kuechly was listed as the No. 44 outside linebacker prospect in the class of 2009, which was headed by Jelani Jenkins and Nico Johnson. After official visits to Boston College, Virginia, Duke, and Stanford, Kuechly committed to the Eagles in January 2009.

College recruiting
Name	Hometown	School	Height	Weight	40^{‡}	Commit date
Luke Kuechly; OLB	Cincinnati, Ohio	St. Xavier High School	6 ft 3 in (1.91 m)	220 lb (100 kg)	4.70	Jan 18, 2009
Luke Kuechly; OLB	Recruit ratings: Scout: Rivals: 247Sports: (79)					
Overall recruit ranking: Scout: 23 (SLB) Rivals: 44 (OLB), 37 (OH)
‡ Refers to 40-yard dash; Note: In many cases, Scout, Rivals, 247Sports, On3, and ESPN may conflict in their listings of height, weight and 40 time.; In these cases, the average was taken. ESPN grades are on a 100-point scale.; Sources: "2009 Boston College Football Commitments". Rivals.; "2009 Boston College Football Recruiting Commits". Scout.; "Scout.com Team Recruiting Rankings". Scout.; "2009 Team Ranking". Rivals.com.

== College career ==
Kuechly attended Boston College, a member of the Atlantic Coast Conference (ACC), where he played for the Boston College Eagles football team from 2009 to 2011 under head coach Frank Spaziani.

=== 2009 ===
As a true freshman in 2009, Kuechly became the Eagles' starting outside linebacker after Mark Herzlich announced that he would miss the season after being diagnosed with Ewing's sarcoma, a rare form of cancer. He finished the season with 158 tackles (87 solo), which led the team and conference, as well as being second nationally (first among freshmen). He was the first true freshman in team history to lead the team in tackles and almost broke the freshman tackle record set by Stephen Boyd in 1991. He returned an interception for a touchdown against Central Michigan. For his play, he was named the 2009 ACC Defensive Rookie of the Year and was on the 2009 CFN All-Freshman Defensive Team. CFN named the true freshman Kuechly to its All-America team.

=== 2010 ===
Kuechly moved to middle linebacker at the beginning of his sophomore season. He went on to lead the country with 183 tackles (110 solo) and had an ongoing streak of 21 straight games with at least 10 tackles at the end of the season. Kuechly was named a finalist for the Butkus Award and the Nagurski Award. He broke the school single season record for tackles, topping the previous record of 165, held since 1991 by Tom McManus. After the season, Kuechly was named a unanimous first-team All-American. He was the first consensus All-American for the Eagles since Jamie Silva in 2007. Boston College played in the Kraft Fight Hunger Bowl (the same bowl as the Emerald Bowl from the previous season with a change of corporate sponsorship) at the end of the season and Kuechly was named the defensive MVP for a second time.

=== 2011 ===
Kuechly led the nation with 191 tackles (102 solo) during the season, averaging nearly 16 tackles per game. Kuechly compiled his stats in the 12-game regular season, as the team finished with a 4–8 record and was ineligible for post-season play. He still almost broke the NCAA Football Bowl Subdivision (FBS) single-season tackle record (193, set by Lawrence Flugence in a 14-game season) and did break the single season tackles-per-game record with 15.9 (previously held by Rick Sherrod with a 15.6 average over a 10-game season). He broke his own team and conference single-season tackle records set just a year earlier.

In only three seasons of play, Kuechly set the Boston College and ACC career tackle records with 532 tackles, eclipsing the previous record of 524 held by Stephen Boyd and only 13 short of the NCAA FBS record held by Tim McGarigle. On December 4, Dick Butkus personally presented the 2011 Butkus Award to Kuechly at the Boston College team banquet a week before the expected formal announcement of the recipient. Kuechly went on to win the Lombardi Award, the Lott IMPACT Trophy, and the Bronko Nagurski Trophy, and was recognized as a consensus first-team All-American for the second consecutive year.

== Professional career ==
=== Pre-draft ===
I call him Clark Kent, and he can turn into Superman on Saturdays and Sundays. He's one of the cleanest players in this draft. His instincts and his pass-coverage ability might be the best of any linebacker I've seen come out of the draft.

— Mike Mayock, NFL Network analyst

On January 6, 2012, Kuechly announced his intention to forgo his final year of college eligibility and enter the 2012 NFL draft. At the time of his announcement, he was rated the top linebacker available in this draft: Mel Kiper Jr. ranked him tenth on his "Big Board," while Todd McShay ranked him thirteenth in his "Top 32." Kuechly squashed any lingering doubts about his athleticism with his performance at the combine and pro day workouts, demonstrating rare pass coverage abilities that would allow him to be a "three-down" inside linebacker (i.e., not subbed-out on obvious passing downs), which raised his draft stock even further.

Pre-draft measurables
Height	Weight	Arm length	Hand span	Wingspan	40-yard dash	10-yard split	20-yard split	20-yard shuttle	Three-cone drill	Vertical jump	Broad jump	Bench press	Wonderlic
6 ft 3 1/4 in (1.91 m)	242 lb (110 kg)	31 in (0.79 m)	9 3/4 in (0.25 m)	6 ft 3 1/8 in (1.91 m)	4.58 s	1.57 s	2.63 s	4.12 s	6.92 s	38.0 in (0.97 m)	10 ft 3 in (3.12 m)	27 reps	34
All values from NFL Combine

=== 2012 ===
I love that when that passion comes out of him, maybe a sprawl or a flex or something like that. But then, off the field? Completely unassuming, we'd walk right by him, and you wouldn't even know he was an NFL player... kind of has that Clark Kent air about him. That's why I call him 'Super Luke'.

— Jon Beason, former Carolina Panthers linebacker

Kuechly was selected by the Carolina Panthers in the first round: the first linebacker selected and the ninth overall pick. On May 10, 2012, Kuechly signed a 4-year, $12.58 million contract.

Kuechly began the season at outside linebacker instead of middle linebacker; After considering Kuechly as starting middle linebacker, head coach Ron Rivera decided to start veteran Jon Beason at middle linebacker due to his experience. When Beason was placed on injured reserve due to a torn Achilles tendon, Kuechly was moved to middle linebacker. Due to his strong performance at middle linebacker, Rivera announced that Kuechly would be the team's long-term starter at that position even after Beason returned from his injury. In a 30–20 victory over the Atlanta Falcons in Week 14, Kuechly recorded a career-high 16 tackles and was honored as NFC Defensive Player of the Week; Kuechly received the NFC Defensive Rookie of the Month award in December, recording a league-high 59 tackles over the final five games of the season. He became the second Panther after Julius Peppers to receive the award. Kuechly led the league with 164 tackles during the regular season and recorded eight pass deflections, one sack, two interceptions, and three fumble recoveries. He was awarded the AP Defensive Rookie of the Year and received the Defensive Rookie of the Year award from Pro Football Weekly. He was named to the PFWA All-Rookie Team.

While not being an official stat kept by the NFL, after tape review, Panthers coaches credited Kuechly with a franchise record 205 tackles, surpassing James Anderson's 174 set in 2011, and became the first rookie to lead the NFL in that department since Patrick Willis in 2007. Kuechly was rated as the 79th best player on the NFL Top 100 list.

=== 2013: Defensive Player of the Year ===
Kuechly signing autographs at Panthers training camp

Kuechly brought his play to a whole new level in his second season, becoming the leader of a stingy Panthers defense that finished the season as runner-up in points and yards allowed. In Week 10, he earned NFC Defensive Player of the Week for his effort in a 10–9 victory over San Francisco 49ers. On Sunday, December 22, 2013, Kuechly recorded 24 tackles and one interception in a game against the New Orleans Saints, which the Carolina Panthers won and made the playoffs. Kuechly's 24 tackles nearly tied the NFL record for most tackles in a game. After film review, the number was increased to 26, which is six tackles more than the previous team record held by James Anderson, and a new NFL single game record. He earned NFC Defensive Player of the Week for his game against the Saints. Kuechly was selected to the 2014 Pro Bowl where he had a team high 12 tackles for Team Sanders. Kuechly was named to the 2013 All-Pro Team and recognized as the NFL Defensive Player of the Year by the Associated Press, joining Lawrence Taylor as the only players in NFL history to win the NFL Defensive Rookie of the Year and NFL Defensive Player of the Year in successive years. Further, Kuechly joined Taylor, Joe Greene, Jack Lambert, Dana Stubblefield, Charles Woodson, Brian Urlacher, and Terrell Suggs as the only players to win both awards. He was also named The Sporting News Defensive Player of the Year. Kuechly was rated as the 15th best player in the NFL Top 100 Players of 2014 list.

=== 2014 ===
During the season opener against the Tampa Bay Buccaneers, Kuechly recorded nine tackles, a sack, a forced fumble, and had a tipped pass that led to an interception. In a Week 2 game against the Detroit Lions, Kuechly recorded 11 tackles and two pass deflections en route to a 24–7 victory. During the Panthers Week 5 victory over the Chicago Bears, Kuechly was credited with 15 tackles without a missed tackle and allowed only 47 yards on nine receptions in coverage. Through the first five games of the season, Pro Football Focus has rated Kuechly as the best inside linebacker in the NFL. During Week 7 against the Green Bay Packers on October 19, 2014, Kuechly was ejected for making inadvertent contact with an official; while trying to break free of a pile, Kuechly was grabbed from behind by an official. Not knowing it was an official, Kuechly swung his arm, resulting in his ejection. The NFL later determined that Kuechly should not have been ejected. Kuechly finished the regular season, leading the NFL in tackles with 153, along with three sacks, one interception, one forced fumble, and a career-high 12 pass deflections. He was voted to the Pro Bowl and was also selected to the NFL All-Pro First-team for the second consecutive season. He also won the Butkus Award for the second time, joining Von Miller and Patrick Willis as the only players to win the award in both college and in the NFL.

During the Panthers 27–16 Wild Card Round victory over the Arizona Cardinals, Kuechly made three defensive stops, 10 tackles, one interception, and two pass defenses, one of which he tipped directly to Tre Boston for another interception. During the Panthers' Divisional Round loss to the Seattle Seahawks, Kuechly was credited with eight total tackles (two solo and six assisted). He was ranked 14th by his fellow players on the NFL Top 100 Players of 2015.

=== 2015: Super Bowl appearance ===
On September 10, 2015, Kuechly signed a five-year, $62 million extension with the Panthers, becoming the NFL's highest-paid middle linebacker by annual average salary. During the season opener, Kuechly suffered a concussion during a game against the Jacksonville Jaguars and left the game. He missed the first home game of the 2015 season the following week when the Panthers defeated the Houston Texans. Kuechly returned to the field during the Panthers Week 6 victory over the Seattle Seahawks in Seattle. During the game, he recorded 14 tackles and eight defensive stops. Kuechly continued to play in form during the Panthers victory over the Philadelphia Eagles, recording 11 defensive stops, one tackle-for-loss, one pass defensed, and one quarterback hit.

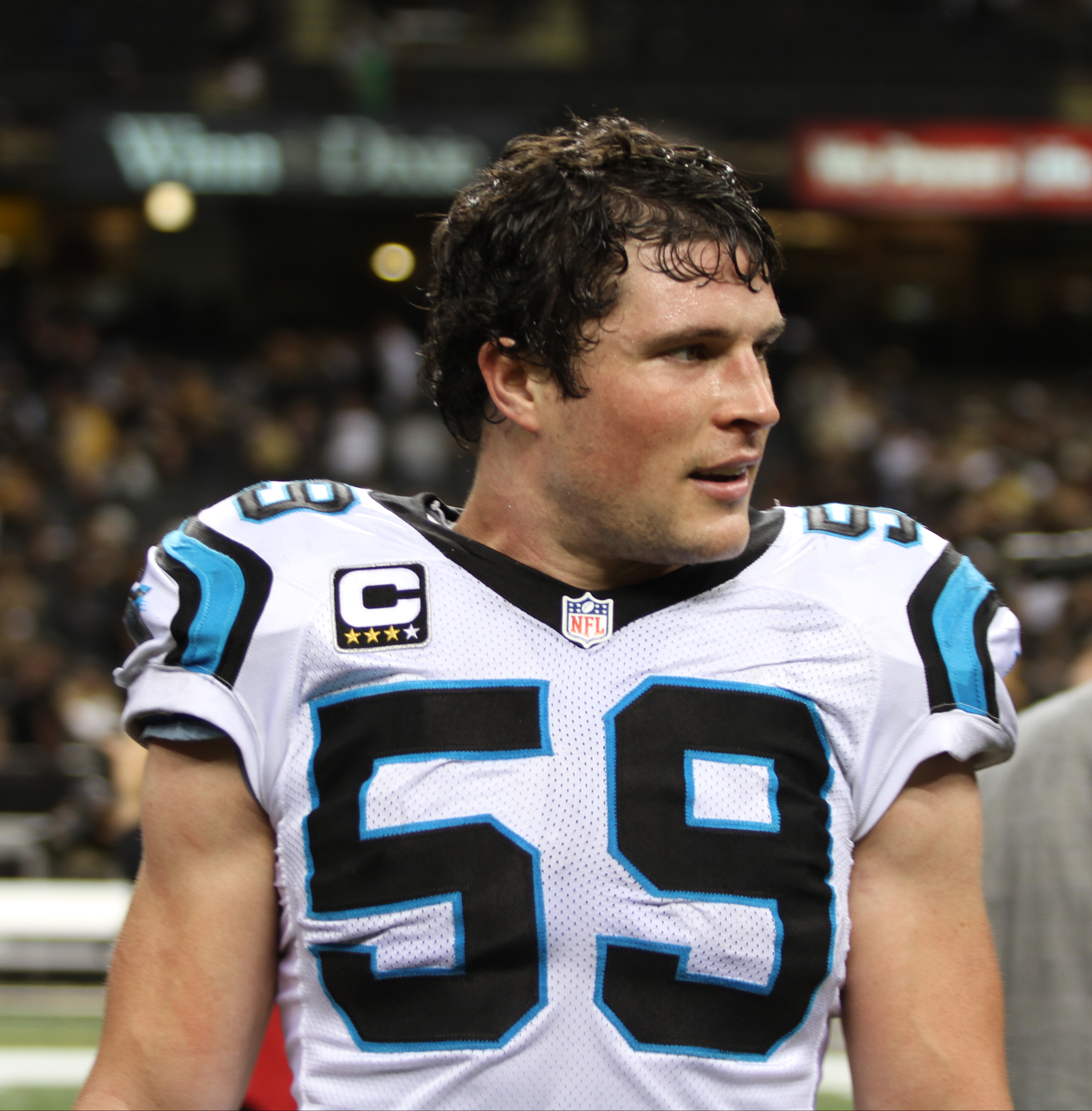
Kuechly with the Carolina Panthers in 2015

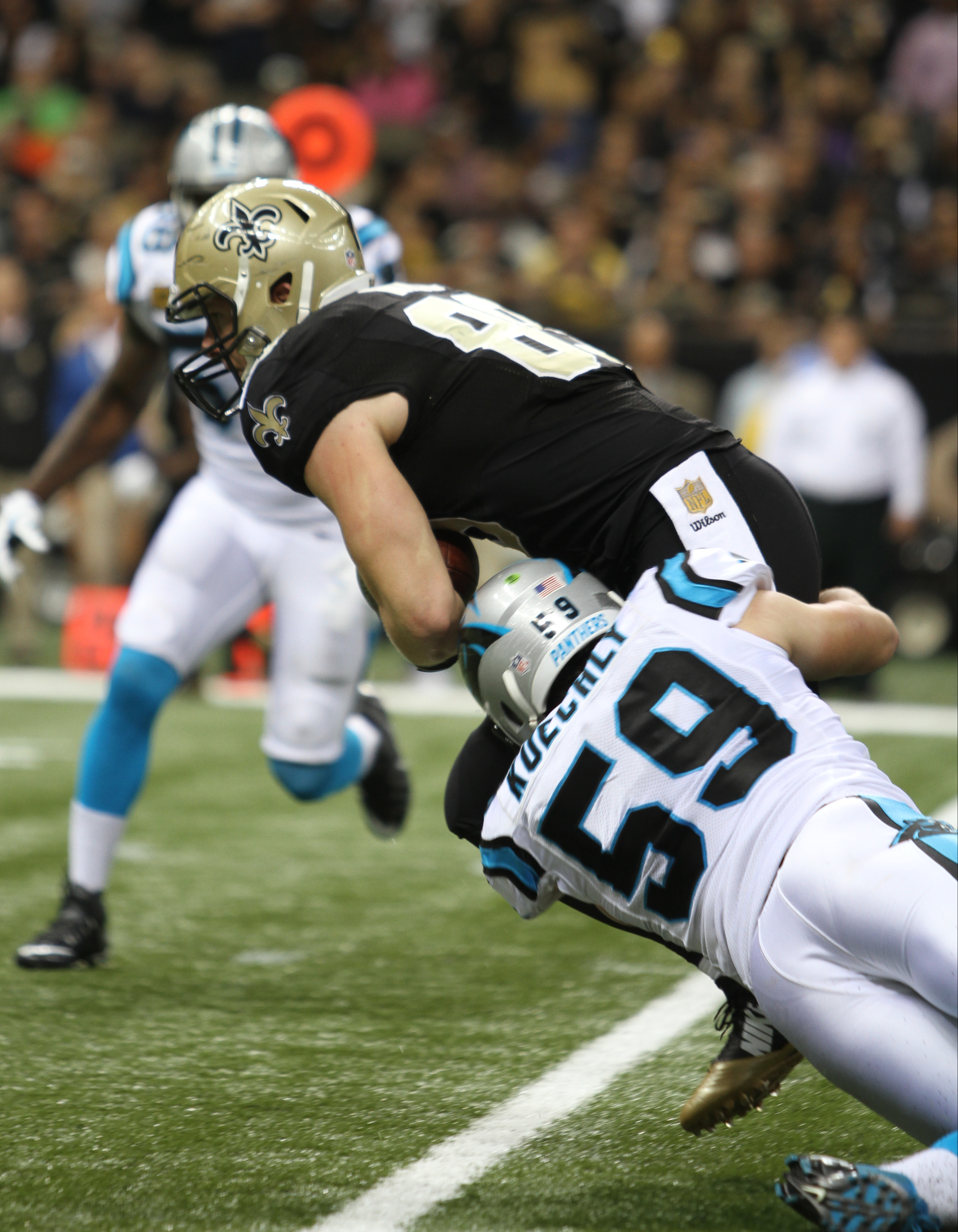
Kuechly playing against the New Orleans Saints in 2015

Kuechly tied a season high 14 tackles during a Monday Night Football victory over the Indianapolis Colts. He also had three passes defended and an interception in overtime to set up a Graham Gano game-winning field goal. Kuechly followed up his impressive performance the following week during the Panthers 37–29 victory over the Green Bay Packers, where he recorded a team-high nine tackles and four stops to go along with his fifth pass defensed of the season. The following week, Kuechly forced a fumble for just the second time in his career during the Panthers 27–10 victory over the Tennessee Titans. The next week, during the Panthers 44–16 victory over the Washington Redskins to move them to 10–0, Kuechly recorded four tackles, one forced fumble, and a fumble recovery. The next week, Kuechly recorded 7 tackles, 2 passes defenses, and 2 interceptions for 49 yards and a touchdown against the Dallas Cowboys in a 33–14 win, which helped Carolina reach 11–0. During the game, Kuechly became the first player with picks on back-to-back plays from scrimmage since 1997 and upped his career total to 10, most among all linebackers since 2012. Additionally, his pick 6 was the first of his NFL career and the first one since his junior season at Boston College. He was awarded the All-Iron Award and NFC Defensive Player of the Week for his performance during the game; it was his fourth such honor in his career, setting a new Panthers' franchise record.

According to PFF through the first 12 weeks of the season, Kuechly's 17.6 run-stop percentage ranked first for any defensive player regardless of position with at least 100 snaps against the run. Further, Kuechly was one of seven linebackers with 30 or more tackles in the run game, and just one missed tackle. In coverage, Kuechly had three interceptions and four passes defended with no touchdowns allowed. He also allowed the second-lowest passer rating among all linebackers when targeted in coverage at 47.4 and is the one of just three linebacker with more than 25 tackles in coverage, and only one missed tackle. During the Panthers week 14 victory over the Atlanta Falcons, Kuechly recorded his fourth interception of this season against quarterback Matt Ryan. His 11 career interceptions are the most by any linebacker since he came into the league in 2012. During the Panthers thrilling 38–35 victory over the New York Giants to move them to 14–0, Kuechly recorded 15 tackles, his highest total since 2014 Week 5. Kuechly was the winner of PFF's inaugural Dick "Night Train" Lane Award, given to the defender who performed the best in pass-coverage over the course of the season. Kuechly led all linebackers in allowing a passer rating of just 48.7 into his coverage (playoffs included).

In the Panthers' 31–24 win over the Seattle Seahawks in the NFC Divisional Round, Kuechly intercepted Seattle quarterback Russell Wilson early in the first quarter and returned the pick 14 yards for a touchdown to give the Panthers a 14–0 lead. He added another "pick six" late in the Panthers' 49–15 win over the Arizona Cardinals in the NFC Championship. On February 7, 2016, Kuechly was part of the Panthers team that played in Super Bowl 50. In the game, he recorded 10 tackles and a sack, but the Panthers fell to the Denver Broncos by a score of 24–10. Ten days after, it was announced that Kuechly would undergo surgery to repair a torn labrum. Sources said that he had played through the injury throughout the postseason.

Kuechly was named to his third straight Pro Bowl, third straight first-team All-Pro, and was ranked as the seventh best player by his peers on the NFL Top 100 Players of 2016.

=== 2016 ===
In 2016, Kuechly started 10 games before suffering a concussion in Week 11, keeping him out the rest of the season. Despite the concussion and missing six games, Kuechly still recorded over 100 tackles, two sacks, six passes defensed, and one interception. He made his fourth straight Pro Bowl and was named second-team All-Pro, and was ranked 20th by his fellow players on the NFL Top 100 Players of 2017 as the highest ranked middle linebacker.

=== 2017 ===
On September 10, 2017, in the season opening 23–3 victory over the San Francisco 49ers, Kuechly recorded an interception off of quarterback Brian Hoyer to go along with five solo tackles and two assisted tackles. On October 12, 2017, Kuechly was placed into the concussion protocol after seemingly suffering his third concussion in as many seasons during a Thursday Night Football game against the Philadelphia Eagles, although this was just a precaution. On October 27, 2017, it was announced that Kuechly had cleared the concussion protocol. He made his return against the Tampa Bay Buccaneers on October 29, where he would record six solo tackles, two assisted tackles, and an interception off of a Jameis Winston pass. In Week 12, Kuechly returned a strip-sacked fumble 34 yards for the touchdown in a 35–27 win over the New York Jets, earning him NFC Defensive Player of the Week. On December 19, 2017, Kuechly was named to his fifth straight Pro Bowl. He earned First-team All-Pro honors for the fourth time. He was ranked 12th by his fellow players on the NFL Top 100 Players of 2018.

=== 2018 ===
Kuechly started off the 2018 season strong with 13 combined tackles in the 16–8 victory over the Dallas Cowboys in Week 1. In Week 3, against the Cincinnati Bengals, he recorded his lone interception on the season. On October 21, against the Philadelphia Eagles, he once again recorded 13 combined tackles to go along with a quarterback hit in the 21–17 victory. In Week 14, against the Cleveland Browns, he recorded two forced fumbles in the game. Overall, on the 2018 season, he started in all 16 games and finished with two sacks, 130 total tackles, five quarterback hits, one interception, six passes defensed, and two forced fumbles. For the fifth time in his career, he was named as a First-team All-Pro. He was named to his sixth consecutive Pro Bowl, which he withdrew from. He was ranked 24th by his fellow players on the NFL Top 100 Players of 2019.

=== 2019 ===
In Week 2 against the Tampa Bay Buccaneers, Kuechly made 17 tackles, including 2.5 tackles for loss and tackling running back Peyton Barber in his own endzone for a safety as the Panthers lost 20–14. In Week 5 of the regular season Luke Kuechly had a game-high 12 tackles and the game-sealing pass deflection on the last play. He also reached a milestone with 1,000 career tackles, becoming the first player in NFL history to do so in his first eight seasons and the fastest to reach the mark in only 107 games. In Week 6 against the Tampa Bay Buccaneers in London, Kuechly recorded his first interception of the season off Jameis Winston in the 37–26 win. In Week 8 against the San Francisco 49ers, Kuechly recorded a team high 10 tackles and intercepted Jimmy Garoppolo once in the 51–13 loss. In Week 15 against the Seattle Seahawks, Kuechly recorded a team high 17 tackles during the 30–24 loss. In the 2019 season, Kuechly finished with 144 total tackles, 12 passes defended, two interceptions, and one safety. He was named to the Pro Bowl for the seventh consecutive year.

=== Retirement ===
On January 14, 2020, Kuechly announced his retirement at the age of 28 due to the effects of his various concussions.

Kuechly was named to the Pro Football Hall of Fame All-Decade Team for the 2010s.

In 2026, Kuechly was inducted into the Pro Football Hall of Fame in his second year of eligibility, becoming the first inductee to have started their career in the 2010s.

== Player profile ==
Standing 6 feet 3 inches (1.91 m) and weighing 238 pounds (108.0 kg), Kuechly was slightly taller but slightly lighter than the average linebacker (6 feet 2 inches (1.88 m), 246 pounds (111.6 kg)). Kuechly was a top impact player each year in his professional career, and was frequently compared to Hall of Fame player Brian Urlacher.

Through 2017 many analysts, coaches, and current and former players considered Kuechly to be the best linebacker in the game. Kuechly had an immediate impact his rookie season, as he led the NFL in tackles and won the Associated Press 2012 NFL Defensive Rookie of the Year award, becoming the third youngest recipient in its history, and was voted the youngest recipient of the AP NFL Defensive Player of the Year Award in the award's history. He was consistently ranked in the NFL Top 100 players throughout his career. In particular, he was rated among the best coverage players each year in his career and was rated the best coverage defender among all defensive players, by Pro Football Focus in 2015, which is considered a rare honor for a linebacker.

== Career statistics ==
=== NFL ===
Legend
	NFL Defensive Player of the Year
	Led the league
**Bold**	Career high

==== Regular season ====
Year	Team	Games		Tackles						Interceptions						Fumbles			
Year	Team	GP	GS	Cmb	Solo	Ast	Sck	Sfty	TfL	PD	Int	Yds	Avg	Lng	TD	FF	FR	Yds	TD
2012	CAR	16	16	**164**	**103**	61	1.0	0	12	8	2	22	11.0	25	0	0	**3**	9	0
2013	CAR	16	16	156	93	**63**	2.0	0	10	7	**4**	33	8.2	30	0	0	0	0	0
2014	CAR	16	16	153	99	54	**3.0**	0	9	**12**	1	0	0.0	0	0	1	1	0	0
2015	CAR	13	13	118	76	42	1.0	0	7	10	**4**	**48**	12.0	**32T**	**1**	**2**	1	0	0
2016	CAR	10	10	102	71	31	2.0	0	6	6	1	1	1.0	1	0	1	0	0	0
2017	CAR	15	15	125	74	51	1.5	0	7	6	3	23	7.7	23	0	1	**3**	**34**	**1**
2018	CAR	16	16	130	93	37	2.0	0	**20**	6	1	0	0.0	0	0	**2**	1	0	0
2019	CAR	16	16	144	81	**63**	0.0	**1**	4	**12**	2	26	**13.0**	25	0	0	0	0	0
Career		118	118	1,092	690	402	12.5	1	75	67	18	153	8.5	32	1	7	9	43	1

==== Postseason ====
Year	Team	Games		Tackles					Interceptions						Fumbles			
Year	Team	GP	GS	Cmb	Solo	Ast	Sck	Sfty	PD	Int	Yds	Avg	Lng	TD	FF	FR	Yds	TD
2013	CAR	1	1	10	3	7	**1.0**	0	1	0	0	0.0	0	0	0	0	0	0
2014	CAR	2	2	18	8	10	0.0	0	2	1	1	1.0	1	0	0	0	0	0
2015	CAR	3	3	**29**	**13**	**16**	**1.0**	0	**4**	**2**	**36**	**18.0**	**22**	**2**	0	**1**	0	0
2017	CAR	1	1	4	4	0	0.0	0	0	0	0	0.0	0	0	0	0	0	0
Career		7	7	61	28	33	2.0	0	7	3	37	12.3	22	2	0	1	0	0

=== College ===
Legend
	Led the NCAA
**Bold**	Career high

Season	Team	GP	Defense						
Season	Team	GP	Solo	Ast	Cmb	TfL	Sck	Int	FF
2009	Boston College	13	87	71	158	**13.0**	1.0	1	0
2010	Boston College	13	**110**	73	183	10.5	**1.5**	**3**	0
2011	Boston College	12	102	**89**	**191**	12.0	0.0	**3**	0
Total		38	299	233	532	35.5	2.5	7	0

== Awards and honors ==
NFL

- NFL Defensive Player of the Year (2013)
- NFL Defensive Rookie of the Year (2012)
- 5× First-team All-Pro (2013–2015, 2017, 2018)
- 2× Second-team All-Pro (2016, 2019)
- 7× Pro Bowl (2013–2019)
- 2× NFL combined tackles leader (2012, 2014)
- NFL 2010s All-Decade Team
- 3× Butkus Award (pro) (2014, 2015, 2017)
- PFWA All-Rookie Team (2012)
- Art Rooney Award (2017)
- 7× NFL Top 100 — 79th (2013), 15th (2014), 14th (2015), 7th (2016), 20th (2017), 12th (2018), 24th (2019)

College

- Bronko Nagurski Trophy (2011)
- Lombardi Award (2011)
- Lott Trophy (2011)
- Butkus Award (college) (2011)
- Jack Lambert Trophy (2011)
- Unanimous All-American (2010)
- Consensus All-American (2011)
- 3× First-team All-American (2009, 2010, 2011)
- 2× NCAA combined tackles leader (2010, 2011)
- 2× NCAA solo tackles leader (2010, 2011)
- ACC Athlete of the Year (2012)
- ACC Defensive Player of the Year (2011)
- ACC Defensive Rookie of the Year (2009)
- 3× First-team All-ACC (2009–2011)
- Boston College Eagles Jersey No. 40 retired
- Emerald Bowl Defensive MVP (2009)
- FWAA 75th Anniversary All-America Team (2015)

== Post-playing career ==
After retiring, Kuechly considered becoming a broadcaster or coach before deciding to enter scouting. On June 4, 2020, he returned to the Panthers as a pro scout. Kuechly resigned from his scout position in the 2021 offseason.

In August 2021, he was seen at a Buffalo Bills practice assisting his former defensive coordinator Sean McDermott.

In 2022, Kuechly joined the Panthers' radio broadcast team as an analyst. He announced seven games in that first season. In 2024, Kuechly added television announcing duties when CBS Sports hired him as an analyst for its coverage of college football.

== Personal life ==
While attending St. Xavier High School, Kuechly wore number 3. After his rookie season in the NFL, Kuechly returned to Boston College and completed a full semester of classes toward his undergraduate degree. In 2015 he completed his final degree requirements to earn a marketing degree from the Boston College Carroll School of Management.

Kuechly is a devout Catholic and credits his parents and his faith for making a positive impact on his NFL career and his outlook on life:

"I went to a Catholic grade school, Jesuit high school and a Jesuit college, and I think you just learn certain things growing up in that environment. Really, the biggest thing I learned from it is respect and to treat people correctly."

== See also ==
- List of NCAA major college football yearly tackles leaders
