= Jordan Gross =

American football player (born 1980)

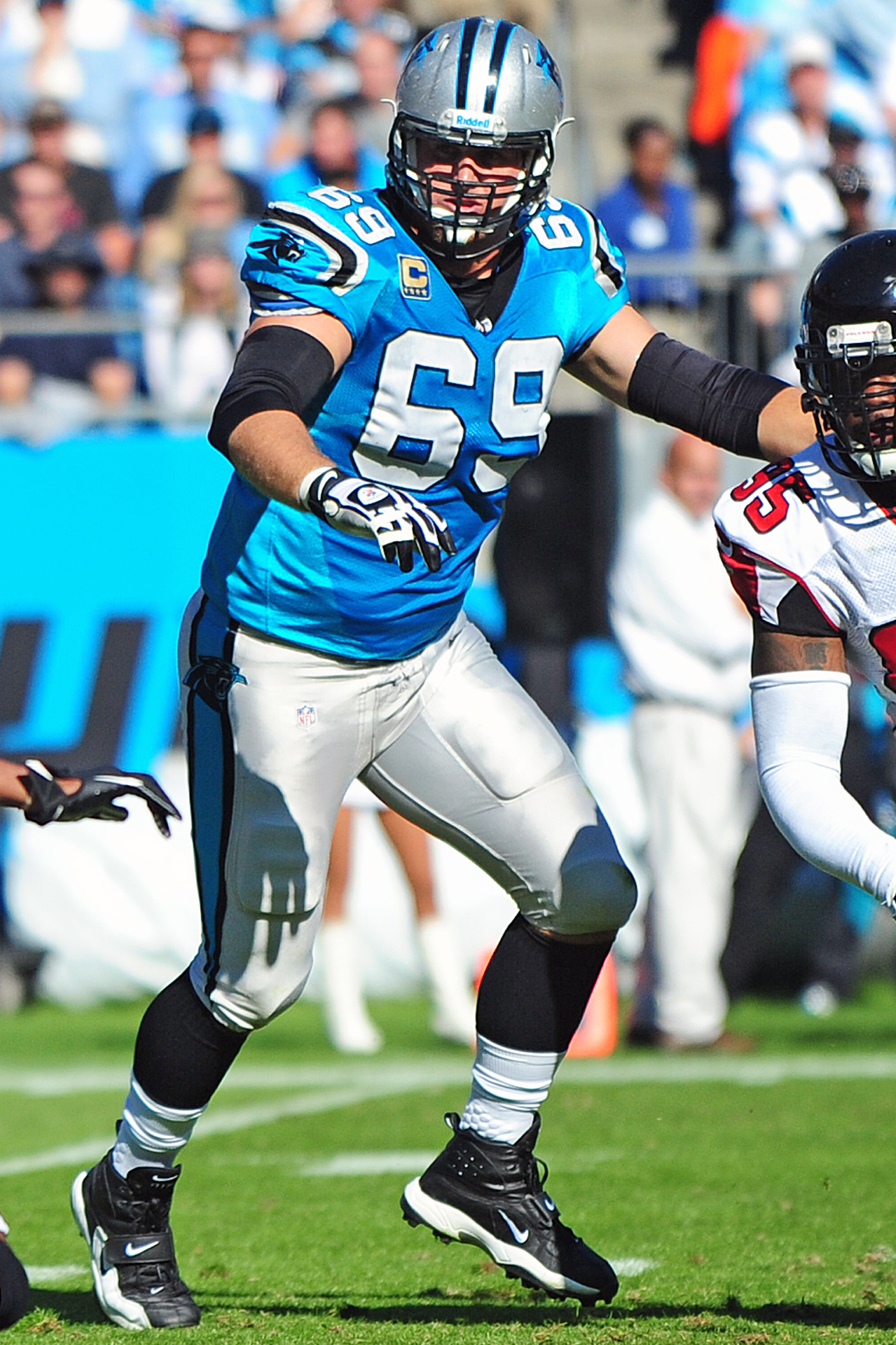
- Gross with the Carolina Panthers in 2013

No. 69
- Position: Offensive tackle

Personal information
- Born: July 20, 1980 (age 46); Nampa, Idaho, U.S.
- Listed height: 6 ft 4 in (1.93 m)
- Listed weight: 305 lb (138 kg)

Career information
- High school: Fruitland (Fruitland, Idaho)
- College: Utah (1999–2002)
- NFL draft: 2003: 1st round, 8th overall pick

Career history
- Carolina Panthers (2003–2013)

Awards and highlights
- First-team All-Pro (2008); 3× Pro Bowl (2008, 2010, 2013); PFWA All-Rookie Team (2003); Carolina Panthers Hall of Honor; Consensus All-American (2002); First-team All-MW (2002)

Career NFL statistics
- Games played: 167
- Games started: 167
- Fumble recoveries: 6
- Stats at Pro Football Reference

Jordan Alan Gross (born July 20, 1980) is an American former professional football player who was an offensive tackle for the Carolina Panthers of the National Football League (NFL). He played college football for the Utah Utes, earning consensus All-American honors. He spent his entire career with the Panthers, who selected him eighth overall in the 2003 NFL draft. He is currently the offensive line coach for the Utah Utes.

== Early life ==
Gross was born in Nampa, Idaho. He attended Fruitland High School in Fruitland, Idaho, where he was a letterman in high school football, basketball, and track and field. In football, he was a first-team all-state selection as both an offensive and defensive lineman as a senior, and helped lead his team win the conference championship as a sophomore. In basketball, he won all-conference honors. He was involved in tae kwon do since age 6, earning a black belt.

== College career ==
While attending the University of Utah, Gross played for the Utah Utes football team from 1999 to 2002. After redshirting his freshman year, he started three games, and played in the Las Vegas Bowl, where the Mountain West Conference (MWC) champion Utes beat Fresno State by a score of 17–16. The following season, he received honorable mention All-MWC honors after starting all 11 games, switching between offensive tackle and offensive guard. His versatility increased as a junior, as he played left tackle, left guard, and right tackle, and finished the season once again as an honorable mention All-MWC selection. His offensive line allowed only five sacks all season, which tied the University of Miami Hurricanes record for fewest allowed in the nation. Gross himself did not allow any sacks in his final two seasons at Utah. Following his 2002 senior season, he was a first-team All-MWC selection, and was recognized as a consensus first-team All-American. He was also a finalist for the Outland Trophy, which is given to the best interior lineman in college football, after not allowing a sack all season at left tackle.

=== Awards and honors ===
- 2× Honorable mention All-Mountain West (2000, 2001)
- First-team All-Mountain West (2002)
- Consensus first-team All-American (2002)
- Outland Trophy finalist (2002)

== Professional career ==
Pre-draft measurables
Height	Weight	Arm length	Hand span	40-yard dash	10-yard split	20-yard split	20-yard shuttle	Three-cone drill	Vertical jump	Broad jump	Bench press
6 ft 4 1/2 in (1.94 m)	300 lb (136 kg)	33 1/4 in (0.84 m)	9 7/8 in (0.25 m)	5.06 s	1.78 s	2.92 s	4.39 s	7.69 s	31.5 in (0.80 m)	9 ft 4 in (2.84 m)	28 reps
All values from NFL Combine

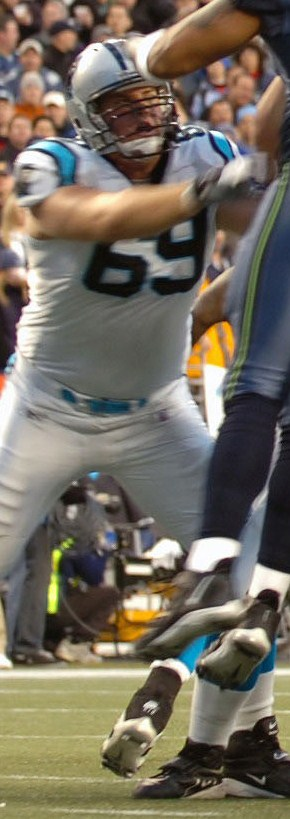
Gross with the Panthers in Jan. 2006

Projected as an early first round selection, Gross was ranked as the No. 1 offensive tackle available in the 2003 NFL draft. He was taken in the first round (8th overall) of the 2003 NFL draft by Carolina. At the time, he was the highest selected Utah Utes player ever (until surpassed by Alex Smith in 2005).

Gross started every game for the Panthers that season at right tackle, and in fact did not miss a single offensive play, a rarity for many veterans, much less rookies. He allowed only three sacks all season, and was an anchor on the offensive line that sent the Panthers to Super Bowl XXXVIII. He made the Pro Football Weekly All-Rookie and Sports Illustrated All-Pro teams that season. Due to retirements and personnel shifts, Gross moved from right tackle to left tackle for the 2004 NFL season; he and center Jeff Mitchell were the only two returning starters on the offensive line that season. The instability on the line was one of many problems for the Panthers, who were plagued with injuries, and they finished the season 7–9. The following year, he moved back to right tackle, and the Panthers' starters remained the same during the entire season. On February 19, 2008, the Panthers named Gross their franchise player and placed the franchise tag on him giving him a one-year $7.45 million deal. This later proved to be a good move, as he was voted to the 2009 Pro Bowl. On February 19, 2009, the Panthers would sign Gross to a six-year contract, making him one of the highest-paid offensive lineman in the NFL. In a matchup against the Atlanta Falcons on November 15, 2009, Gross broke his ankle, landing him on the injured reserve list and ending his participation in the 2009 NFL season. He was ranked 87th by his fellow players on the NFL Top 100 Players of 2011.

On February 25, 2014, Gross announced his retirement from professional football. He now works for The Panthers Network as a sideline reporter and hosts his own Television broadcast with longtime offensive lineman Travelle Wharton entitled, "This is Gross," on Time Warner Cable Sports channel.

On July 9, 2019, the Carolina Panthers announced that Gross would be inducted into the Panthers' Hall of Honor along with Jake Delhomme, Wesley Walls, and Steve Smith Sr. On August 14, 2019, he was named to the Panthers' radio team as a color analyst.
