= Patrick Willis =

American football player (born 1985)

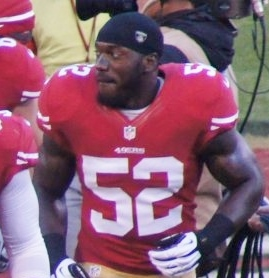
- Willis with the San Francisco 49ers in 2012

No. 52
- Position: Linebacker

Personal information
- Born: January 25, 1985 (age 41); Bruceton, Tennessee, U.S.
- Listed height: 6 ft 1 in (1.85 m)
- Listed weight: 242 lb (110 kg)

Career information
- High school: Central (Bruceton)
- College: Ole Miss (2003–2006)
- NFL draft: 2007: 1st round, 11th overall pick

Career history
- San Francisco 49ers (2007–2014)

Awards and highlights
- NFL Defensive Rookie of the Year (2007); 5× First-team All-Pro (2007, 2009–2012); Second-team All-Pro (2008); 7× Pro Bowl (2007–2013); 2× NFL solo tackles leader (2007, 2009); 2× NFL combined tackles leader (2007, 2009); NFL 2010s All-Decade Team; Butkus Award (pro) (2009); PFWA NFL All-Rookie Team (2007); San Francisco 49ers Hall of Fame; Butkus Award (college) (2006); Jack Lambert Trophy (2006); SEC Defensive Player of the Year (2006); Consensus All-American (2006); First-team All-American (2005); 2× First-team All-SEC (2005, 2006)

Career NFL statistics
- Total tackles: 950
- Sacks: 20.5
- Forced fumbles: 16
- Fumble recoveries: 5
- Pass deflections: 53
- Interceptions: 8
- Defensive touchdowns: 2
- Stats at Pro Football Reference
- Pro Football Hall of Fame
- College Football Hall of Fame

Patrick L. Willis (born January 25, 1985) is an American former professional football player who was a linebacker for his entire eight-year career with the San Francisco 49ers of the National Football League (NFL). He played college football for the Ole Miss Rebels, earning consensus All-American honors in 2006 and was selected by the 49ers in the first round of the 2007 NFL draft. Willis is regarded as one of the greatest linebackers in NFL history.

During Willis's 2006 senior season at Ole Miss, he received the collegiate version of the Butkus Award and the Jack Lambert Award as the nation's top linebacker. A year later as a member of the 49ers, Willis led the NFL in tackles, earned first-team All-Pro and Pro Bowl honors, and was named the 2007 NFL Defensive Rookie of the Year. Willis made the Pro Bowl in his first seven seasons and earned All-Pro honors in his first six years in the NFL. Willis won the professional version of the Butkus Award while with the 49ers in 2009. His career accomplishments culminated with being inducted into the Pro Football Hall of Fame in 2024.

== Early life ==
Born in Bruceton, Tennessee, Willis grew up in abject poverty and had to take care of his younger siblings. By the age of 10, he worked full-time in cotton fields. At age 17, he left his home, a double-wide in a trailer park just outside Bruceton, with his brothers, Orey and Detris, and sister, Ernicka, when his alcoholic father turned increasingly violent. The siblings moved in with Willis's high school basketball coach.

Willis attended Hollow Rock-Bruceton Central High School, where he was a two-time All-State selection, Regional Most Valuable Player, and West Tennessee Player of the Year. He earned four letters in football and basketball, and three in baseball. He was also the first person in Tennessee state history to be nominated for both the Mr. Football Award for a Lineman (as a linebacker) and the Mr. Football Award for a Back (as a tailback) in the same season.

Regarded as a three-star recruit by Rivals.com, Willis was listed as the No. 60 linebacker prospect in the class of 2003. He chose Ole Miss over Memphis.

College recruiting
Name	Hometown	School	Height	Weight	40^{‡}	Commit date
Patrick Willis; LB	Bruceton, Tennessee	Central HS	6 ft 2 in (1.88 m)	217 lb (98 kg)	4.6	Jul 8, 2003
Patrick Willis; LB	Recruit ratings: Scout: Rivals:					
Overall recruit ranking: Scout: 32 (college recruiting) Rivals: 60 (LB); 38 (college recruiting)
‡ Refers to 40-yard dash; Note: In many cases, Scout, Rivals, 247Sports, On3, and ESPN may conflict in their listings of height, weight and 40 time.; In these cases, the average was taken. ESPN grades are on a 100-point scale.; Sources: "2003 Mississippi Football Commitment List". Rivals.; "2003 Ole Miss College Football Team Recruiting Prospects". Scout.; "Scout.com Team Recruiting Rankings". Scout.; "2003 Team Ranking". Rivals.com.

== College career ==
Patrick leads by example. He is not a big talker. He just gets in there and does his job every day and makes everybody around him better.

— former Mississippi coach Ed Orgeron.

Willis attended the University of Mississippi ("Ole Miss"), and played for the Ole Miss Rebels football team from 2003 to 2006. As a freshman at Ole Miss, Willis played in all 13 games and made 20 stops. He received the Scholar-Athlete Award from the Ole Miss chapter of the National Football Foundation and College Football Hall of Fame.

As a sophomore in 2004, he appeared in 10 of 11 games and earned honorable mention All-Southeastern Conference (SEC) honors from the Associated Press. He recorded 70 tackles (54 solo), and led the team with 11.0 tackles for a loss and five sacks.

In Willis's 2005 junior campaign, he led the SEC in total tackles at 12.80 per game, which placed him sixth nationally. He finished season with 128 total tackles, 9.5 tackles for loss, three sacks, an interception, two forced fumbles and a fumble recovery. Willis was named SEC Defensive Player of the Year by CollegeFootballNews.com and Scout.com. He was also named as a first-team All-American by College Football News and the All-American Football Foundation. Willis earned first-team All-SEC honors from the Associated Press, SEC Coaches, CollegeFootballNews.com and Rivals.com.

During Willis's last collegiate year in 2006, he led the SEC in tackles once again with 11.4 per game and collected 137 tackles, 11.5 TFLs, seven passes deflected, three sacks, two forced fumbles and one fumble recovery. He was awarded SEC Defensive Player of the Year, first-team All-SEC, and consensus first-team All-American. He was the winner of the Jack Lambert Award and the prestigious Dick Butkus Award, given to the most outstanding linebacker in college football. He also won the Conerly Trophy, voted upon by the media in Mississippi and awarded to the best college football player in Mississippi. In addition, he was a finalist for the Bronko Nagurski Award and semi-finalist for both the Rotary Lombardi Award and the Lott Trophy.

=== Awards and honors ===
- 2× First-team All-SEC (2005, 2006)
- 2× All-American (2005, 2006)
- SEC Defensive Player of the Year (2006)
- Butkus Award (2006)
- Jack Lambert Trophy (2006)
- Conerly Trophy (2006)
- College Football Hall of Fame - inducted in 2019

== Professional career ==
=== Pre-draft ===
Originally regarded as a late-first to early-second round draft pick, Willis improved his draft stock with an impressive performance at the NFL Combine; his 4.56 40-yard dash was one of the fastest among linebackers. He also posted a 39-inch vertical jump and recorded 22 repetitions of the 225-lb. bench press. Willis clocked in at 4.38 seconds for his 40-yard dash during his University of Mississippi pro-day workout. Analysts of The Sporting News compared him to Jeremiah Trotter. Willis also earned South Team Defensive MVP honors at the 2007 Senior Bowl.

Pre-draft measurables
Height	Weight	Arm length	Hand span	40-yard dash	10-yard split	20-yard split	20-yard shuttle	Three-cone drill	Vertical jump	Broad jump	Bench press	Wonderlic
6 ft 1 1/8 in (1.86 m)	242 lb (110 kg)	34 in (0.86 m)	9 3/4 in (0.25 m)	4.56 s	1.61 s	2.68 s	4.46 s	7.23 s	39 in (0.99 m)	9 ft 11 in (3.02 m)	22 reps	12
All values from the 2007 NFL Combine

=== 2007 ===
"I've coached two of the greatest linebackers—one that has already proven to be one of the greatest and one who will prove to be."

— NFL Hall of Famer Mike Singletary, referring to Ray Lewis and Patrick Willis.

Willis was selected by the San Francisco 49ers in the first round with the 11th overall pick in the 2007 NFL draft, re-uniting him with the staff that coached his South Squad at the 2007 Senior Bowl. He signed a seven-year, $53.51 million contract with the 49ers in the 2010 season.

Willis was coached directly by Hall of Fame middle-linebacker/coach Mike Singletary (who later became 49ers head coach), and eventually started at inside linebacker, specifically the "Mike" position, in the 49ers' 3-4 defense. In his first NFL game, Willis recorded 11 tackles, including 9 solo, and a forced fumble as the 49ers defeated the Arizona Cardinals in dramatic fashion by a score of 20–17. For his effort, he won the Diet Pepsi Rookie of the Week Award. One of Willis's strongest performances came against the Minnesota Vikings, as he led the 49ers defense in containing Offensive Rookie of the Year, Adrian Peterson, who managed just 3 yards on 14 carries. Willis's most impressive statistical performance came in week 16 at home against the Tampa Bay Buccaneers. In this game he recorded 20 total tackles, two sacks, one forced fumble and one pass deflected in a 21–19 victory, earning Rookie of the Week honors for the fourth time. In addition to receiving the award in weeks 1 and 16, Willis took home the award in weeks 2 and 12. He was also awarded the GMC Defensive Player of the Week twice.

In a game against the Arizona Cardinals on November 25, Willis ran down wide receiver Sean Morey after a 62-yard, catch-and-run for the game-saving tackle in overtime. The 49ers eventually won 37–31.

Willis finished the 2007 campaign with an NFL-leading 174 total tackles, along with four sacks, two forced fumbles, and five passes deflected. According to the 49ers, however, he is unofficially credited with over 200 tackles during that season. As a result, Willis was one of two 49ers selected to the Pro Bowl along with punter Andy Lee. Other honors earned at the conclusion of his first professional season included being named AP NFL Defensive Rookie of the Year, first-team All-Pro, and NFL Alumni Linebacker of the Year. He was the only rookie in the NFL to make the AP All-Pro squad and the first defensive rookie from the 49ers to make the Pro Bowl since Ronnie Lott in 1981. His season was capped by being named one of ESPN The Magazine's "NEXT" athletes of 2008, alongside Yankee Joba Chamberlain and Trail Blazer Brandon Roy.

=== 2008 ===
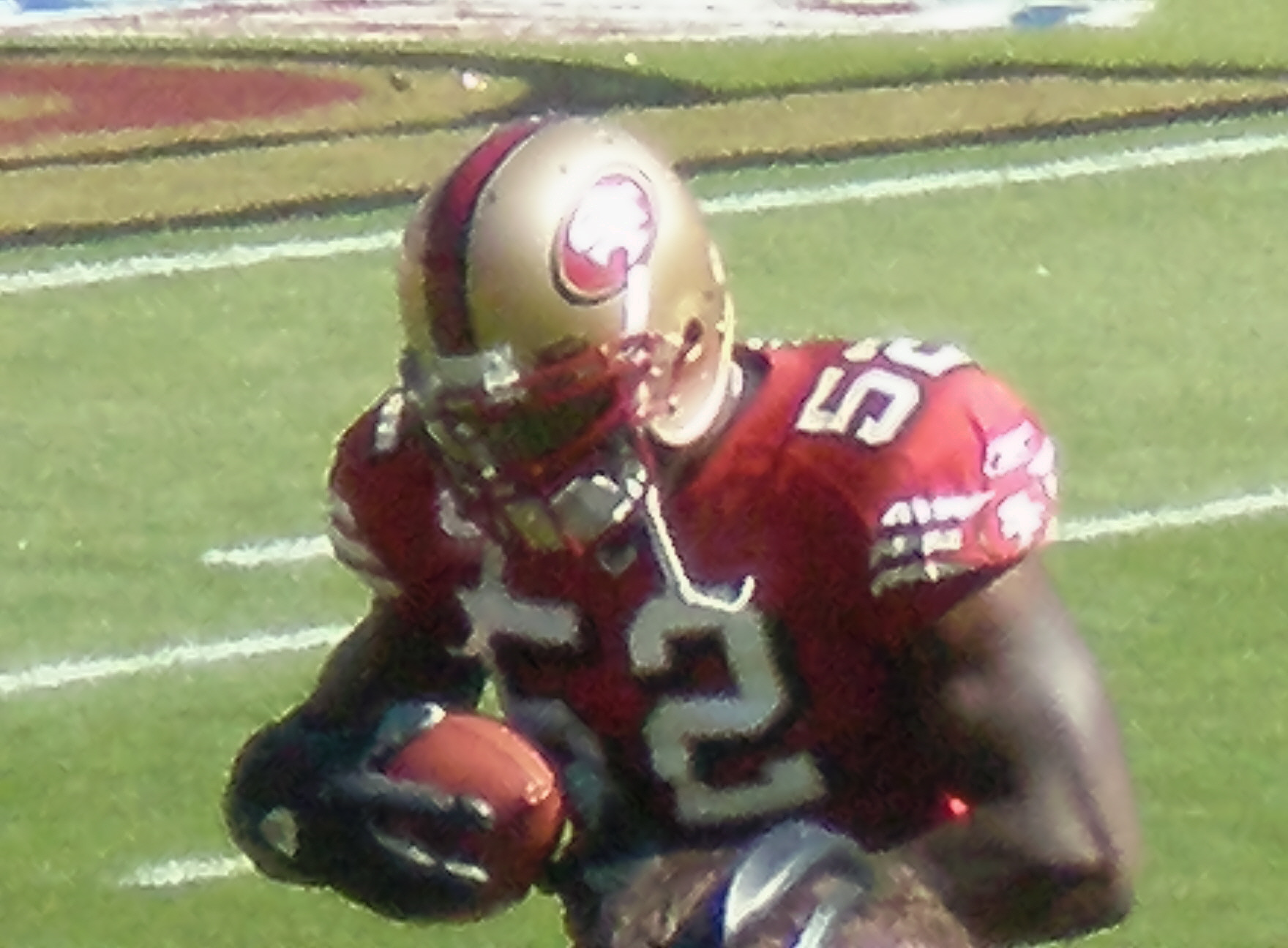
Willis in October 2008

In his second NFL season, Willis scored his first career NFL touchdown against Seattle, returning an interception for 86 yards. In Week 5, he had 18 total tackles (14 solo) and one sack against the Patriots. On December 16, during another dominating season with the 49ers, Willis was named the starting inside linebacker for the NFC Pro Bowl team. In just two seasons, he established himself as one of the top linebackers in the NFL. He finished the 2008 season with one sack, 141 total tackles (109 solo), one interception, ten passes defended, one forced fumble, and fumble recovery.

At the end of the year, Willis finished second in tackles and was voted to his second consecutive Pro Bowl, this time as a starter. He was also voted second-team All-Pro, barely missing the first team as Jon Beason of Carolina Panthers collected one more vote than Willis.

=== 2009 ===
Willis started the season strong in the opener against the Arizona Cardinals. He recorded 14 tackles and an interception in a 20–16 win in Arizona. He also had a productive game in week 4 against St. Louis finishing with 8 tackles, 2.5 sacks and an interception return for a 23-yard touchdown.

The biggest improvement in his game from the previous year was the increased sideline-to-sideline range. Willis made 54 tackles on plays labeled as "Wide left" or "Wide right" which accounted for 35.5% of his total tackles. In that area, he led all inside linebackers by a large margin. He was also the league leader in impact plays with a total of 27.

At the end of the year, Willis accumulated an NFL-leading 152 tackles along with four sacks, three forced fumbles, eight pass deflections and three interceptions. He has now led the league in tackles in two of his first three seasons. Willis also earned first-team All-Pro receiving 49/50 votes from the AP and was voted to his third consecutive Pro Bowl. However, shortly before the Pro Bowl, which was set in South Florida, Willis decided to play it safe and opted not to play due to a leg injury he sustained. He stayed in South Florida for the game and stood on the sideline in support of the NFC team and 49er teammates Frank Gore, Vernon Davis, Justin Smith and Andy Lee.

Willis was named the 2009 NFL Alumni Linebacker of the Year, an award voted on by past NFL linebackers. Willis also became the second NFL player to win the Butkus Award since it was expanded in 2008 to include high school and professional winners in part to help end anabolic steroid abuse among young athletes.

=== 2010 ===
On May 4, Willis signed a five-year contract extension worth $50 million, with $29 million in guaranteed money making him the highest paid inside linebacker in the NFL.

In 2010, Willis strengthened a dimension of his game, totaling a career-high 6.0 sacks with 128 total tackles (101 solo) and five passes defended. He played through the season with several injuries, playing a game against the San Diego Chargers with a cast on his broken hand. Willis was ruled out for week 17 after undergoing a second surgery on his broken right hand. It was the first time that Willis had ever missed a game in his career. Willis had also made a habit of making it to the Pro Bowl. He had gone all four seasons of his NFL career and even with his tackle numbers down (largely due to offenses scheming against him), Willis still finished with the second-most fan votes for inside linebackers in the entire NFL. He joined Hall of Fame safety Ronnie Lott as only 49ers to be selected to the Pro Bowl in each of their first four seasons.

Willis also earned first-team All-Pro from the Associated Press alongside Jerod Mayo of the New England Patriots. For the third time in his career, and the second year in a row, he was named Linebacker of the Year by the NFL Alumni Association. He was ranked 23rd by his fellow players on the NFL Top 100 Players of 2011.

=== 2011 ===
Before the start of the 2011 season, Willis ran away from the field in the voting for the NFL's best linebacker on ESPN.com. "Nobody in the NFL plays their position better than Patrick Willis, and that is saying a lot," said Matt Williamson of Scouts Inc. "He is as good a linebacker as Peyton Manning is a quarterback, as Andre Johnson is a receiver, as Adrian Peterson is a running back. He has no weaknesses." Even 12-time Pro Bowler Ray Lewis, the dominant linebacker of his era, pointed to Willis as a worthy successor to his undisputed reign. ESPN's Dana Jacobson asked Lewis which young linebacker reminded him of himself. "I just love the way he plays the game," Lewis said. "He plays the game with a fire. He reminds me of myself—a lot, a lot, a lot." Willis also came in fourth in an ESPN expert vote for the NFL's 10 best defensive players, finishing only behind 2010 AP NFL Defensive Player of the Year Troy Polamalu, DeMarcus Ware, and Darrelle Revis.

In Week 5, Willis had 12 total tackles and a pass defended in a 48–3 win over the Tampa Bay Buccaneers. He was named NFC Defensive Player of the Week. In the 2011 season, Willis led a top ranked 49ers defense which set an NFL single season record of not allowing a rushing touchdown until week 16. The previous record was held by the 1920 Decatur Staleys, who did not allow a rushing touchdown in a 13-game season. The 49ers' stingy defense ranked fourth overall and played a huge role in the 49ers finishing with a 13–3 record. This also marked the first time since 2002 the 49ers were division champs and back in the playoffs.

During a game against the St. Louis Rams in week 13, Willis landed awkwardly after missing a tackle and injured his right hamstring. Despite missing nearly four games due to the hamstring injury, Willis finished the season with 97 tackles along with two sacks, four forced fumbles, 12 pass deflections and an interception. He also improved his game significantly in coverage recording a career-high 12 pass deflections. Willis was named to his fifth consecutive Pro Bowl and becomes the first player in franchise history to make five Pro Bowl appearances to start a career. In addition, he earned first-team All-Pro from the Associated Press for the third consecutive year. He was ranked tenth by his fellow players on the NFL Top 100 Players of 2012.

=== 2012 ===
In Week 4 of the 2012 season, Willis had ten total tackles and one interception against the New York Jets in a 34–0 victory. He won NFC Defensive Player of the Week. He was named to his sixth consecutive Pro Bowl and was named as a first team All-Pro the fifth time. During the 2012 season, Willis had 120 combined tackles, two forced fumbles (one recovery), two interceptions, nine passes defended, and 0.5 sacks. He led the 49ers into the postseason for a second straight year. Willis recorded ten combined tackles as the 49ers lost Super Bowl XLVII to the Baltimore Ravens by a score of 34–31. Willis had 29 combined tackles and a sack during the 2012 postseason. He was ranked tenth by his fellow players on the NFL Top 100 Players of 2013.

=== 2013 ===
On August 5, 2013, Willis underwent surgery to repair a fractured hand he suffered during training camp. He started the first three games of the season, but then had a groin injury in week 3. He would then miss the next two games. However, in a game against the Atlanta Falcons, he recorded 18 tackles. He ended the 2013 season with 104 total tackles (82 solo). He was named to his seventh consecutive Pro Bowl. He was ranked 27th by his fellow players on the NFL Top 100 Players of 2014.

=== 2014 ===
Willis played in six games of the 2014 season hampered by a nagging toe injury. He made the decision to end his season on November 11 and undergo season-ending surgery on his nagging left big toe, which bothered him for several previous seasons. The 49ers placed Willis on the injured reserve list soon after the surgery.

After struggling with a toe injury that kept him sidelined for most of 2014, Willis announced his retirement on March 10, 2015.

=== Hall of Fame ===
On February 8, 2024, Willis was selected to be inducted into the Pro Football Hall of Fame, in his fifth year of eligibility and second year as a finalist. Former NFL player Bryant Young came up to Willis' home and knocked on the door to announce the news.

== NFL career statistics ==
Legend
	Led the league
**Bold**	Career high

=== Regular season ===
Year	Team	Games		Tackles				Interceptions					Fumbles		
Year	Team	GP	GS	Cmb	Solo	Ast	Sck	PD	Int	Yds	Lng	TD	FF	FR	TD
2007	SF	16	16	**174**	**135**	**39**	4.0	5	0	0	0	0	2	1	0
2008	SF	16	16	141	109	32	1.0	10	1	**86**	**86T**	**1**	1	1	0
2009	SF	16	16	152	114	38	4.0	8	**3**	33	23T	**1**	3	0	0
2010	SF	15	15	128	101	27	**6.0**	5	0	0	0	0	2	0	0
2011	SF	13	13	97	74	23	2.0	**12**	1	10	10	0	**4**	**2**	0
2012	SF	16	16	120	88	32	0.5	9	2	2	2	0	2	1	0
2013	SF	14	14	104	82	22	3.0	1	0	0	0	0	2	0	0
2014	SF	6	6	34	29	5	0.0	3	1	0	0	0	0	0	0
Career		112	112	950	732	218	20.5	53	8	131	86	2	16	5	0

=== Postseason ===
Year	Team	Games		Tackles				Interceptions					Fumbles		
Year	Team	GP	GS	Cmb	Solo	Ast	Sck	PD	Int	Yds	Lng	TD	FF	FR	TD
2011	SF	2	2	16	16	0	**1.0**	**1**	0	0	0	0	0	**1**	0
2012	SF	3	3	**29**	**26**	3	**1.0**	0	0	0	0	0	0	0	0
2013	SF	3	3	26	18	**8**	0.0	**1**	**1**	-1	-1	0	0	0	0
Career		8	8	71	60	11	2.0	2	1	-1	-1	0	0	1	0

== Awards and honors ==
=== NFL ===
- NFL Defensive Rookie of the Year (2007)
- 5× First-team All-Pro (2007, 2009–2012)
- Second-team All-Pro (2008)
- 7× Pro Bowl (2007–2013)
- 2× NFL tackles leader (2007, 2009)
- NFL 2010s All-Decade Team
- PFWA All-Rookie Team (2007)
- Butkus Award (pro) (2009)
- 4× NFL Top 100 — 23rd (2011), 10th (2012), 10th (2013), 27th (2014)
- San Francisco 49ers Hall of Fame
- Pro Football Hall of Fame (2024)

=== College ===
- Butkus Award (college) (2006)
- Jack Lambert Trophy (2006)
- SEC Defensive Player of the Year (2006)
- 2× First-team All-American (2005, 2006)
- 2× First-team All-SEC (2005, 2006)

== Personal life ==
Willis was separated from his biological father at the age of 17, with his mother leaving him when he was a child, and along with his three siblings moved in with his parental guardians, Willis' high school basketball coach, Chris Finley, and his wife, Julie. Willis's brother, Detris, drowned in 2006 while swimming with his friends. His uncle, Arthur Willis, was a professional super middleweight boxer who later fought future world champion James Toney to a split decision.

He holds a degree in criminal justice and envisions a future in law enforcement. Willis is a Christian. Willis says his grandmother told him about Jesus. Willis talks about his faith when he plays saying, "No matter the outcome of a game, my No. 1 goal is to glorify God. I always pray, 'Lord, I don't know what today's game is going to be like, but I pray that you bless me to go out here and play for you. Be a soldier for your army, go out here and lead this team the way you want me to lead it.'"
