= Jon Beason =

American football player (born 1985)

No. 52, 54
- Position: Linebacker

Personal information
- Born: January 14, 1985 (age 41); Miramar, Florida, U.S.
- Listed height: 6 ft 0 in (1.83 m)
- Listed weight: 232 lb (105 kg)

Career information
- High school: Chaminade-Madonna College Prep (Hollywood, Florida)
- College: Miami (FL) (2003–2006)
- NFL draft: 2007: 1st round, 25th overall pick

Career history
- Carolina Panthers (2007–2013); New York Giants (2013–2015)

Awards and highlights
- First-team All-Pro (2008); Second-team All-Pro (2009); 3× Pro Bowl (2008–2010); NFL solo tackles leader (2008); PFWA All-Rookie Team (2007)

Career NFL statistics
- Total tackles: 706
- Sacks: 4
- Forced fumbles: 3
- Fumble recoveries: 4
- Interceptions: 10
- Stats at Pro Football Reference

Jonathan Beason (born January 14, 1985) is an American former professional football linebacker in the National Football League (NFL). He played college football for the Miami Hurricanes, and was selected by the Carolina Panthers in the first round of the 2007 NFL draft. He also played for the New York Giants.

== Early life ==
Beason attended Chaminade Madonna College Preparatory School from 1999–2003. He played multiple positions including linebacker, strong safety and fullback. As a senior, Beason rushed for 811 yards and 12 touchdowns at fullback, and made 75 tackles and had five pass interceptions on defense. Beason also ran track and was on the basketball team.

== College career ==
While attending the University of Miami, Beason played for the Hurricanes. He began his career at fullback, but shifted to linebacker as a redshirt freshman. During his career he collected 187 tackles, 3.5 quarterback sacks, and one interception. He majored in sports administration.

Before the 2006 season, Beason joined the Miami track-and-field team. He competed on the indoor squad during the spring, finishing 18th at the ACC Indoor Track and Field Championships with a season best mark of 6.50 meters in the long jump.

Beason was one of the players in the recording of the song "7th Floor Crew", a lewd rap song about sexual activities on the seventh floor of Mahoney Hall. He went as "Big Beas"

== Professional career ==
Pre-draft measurables
Height	Weight	Arm length	Hand span	40-yard dash	10-yard split	20-yard split	Broad jump	Bench press
6 ft 0 1/4 in (1.84 m)	237 lb (108 kg)	33 1/2 in (0.85 m)	9 1/2 in (0.24 m)	4.78 s	1.64 s	2.77 s	9 ft 3 in (2.82 m)	19 reps
All values from NFL Combine

Some guys are athletes, some guys are big, some guys are mean, he's a football player.

— Former Panther Mike Minter, referring to Jon Beason.

=== Carolina Panthers ===
Beason was selected in the first round with the 25th overall pick in the 2007 NFL draft by the Carolina Panthers. Beason had a great rookie season, finishing second behind Patrick Willis in tackles for a rookie with 140. He finished second in the NFL Defensive Rookie of the Year voting behind Willis, receiving two votes. During Beason's second year he was selected to his first Pro Bowl and was an AP All-Pro selection after recording 138 tackles and three interceptions. In the 2009 season Beason recorded three sacks, three interceptions, a forced fumble, and 141 tackles, including 111 solo tackles. As a result, he was a second-team pick on the 2009 All-Pro Team, and also received a spot in the Pro Bowl when Patrick Willis backed out due to injury. Due to an injury to outside linebacker Thomas Davis, who was placed on the Physically Unable to Perform list, Beason volunteered to move to the outside linebacker position while Davis recovered. However, Davis was not taken off the list by the Panthers, and Beason had to assume the role further until Dan Connor, who had taken over the inside linebacker position, had a season-ending injury, thus moving Beason back inside. Due to him switching positions, he finished the season with the worst statistical performance of his career, recording only 121 tackles (9 less than fellow Panther James Anderson and the first time in his career he did not place first in team tackles). However, Beason was rewarded for his temporary switch to the position, and was designated a Pro Bowl alternate at the outside linebacker position, and later was awarded a spot when Lance Briggs backed out due to an injury. He was ranked 95th by his fellow players on the NFL Top 100 Players of 2011.

On July 28, 2011, Beason and the Panthers agreed to terms on a deal that would make him the highest-paid middle linebacker in NFL history. The deal was worth $50 million over 5 years, with $25 million guaranteed. On September 14, Beason was placed on the injured reserve list with an injured left Achilles tendon. However, in the 2012 NFL season, Beason lost his middle linebacker starting position to Boston College draft pick Luke Kuechly, who would win the Defensive Rookie of the year for the 2012 season.

After starting the first two games of the 2013 season, Beason lost his starting job to Chase Blackburn. Despite playing in all 64 regular season games, as well as one playoff game, during the first four years of his Panthers career, Beason managed to only appear in five during his last two full seasons with the team.

=== New York Giants ===
On October 4, 2013, Beason was traded to the New York Giants in exchange for a seventh–round pick.

Beason's play significantly improved as a member of the Giants; in his 12 games with the Giants during the 2013 season, they went 7-4 (after an 0-4 start), and he had 93 tackles. On March 12, 2014, Beason and the Giants came to an agreement on a new contract, signing a three-year $16.8 million deal. Beason tore a ligament and fractured the sesamoid bone in his toe in a June practice and missed all of training camp and all five of the Giants' preseason games. He played in the first two games of the season but reinjured the toe and missed the next three before returning to play on a limited basis against the Philadelphia Eagles in Week 6 and Dallas Cowboys in Week 7. After his visit with doctors, Beason said in a radio interview that he might have to have the season-ending toe surgery to finally take care of the problem, and that turned out to be the case.

On November 7, 2015, Beason was placed on the Giants' injured reserve for ankle and knee injuries, after appearing in only 5 of the Giants eight games. Beason announced his retirement on February 10, 2016. He was scheduled to undergo knee surgery and was told by doctors that it was best he retire. Beason ended up playing just 21 games in three seasons with the Giants.

== NFL career statistics ==
Year	Team	GP	Tackles				Fumbles		Interceptions					
Year	Team	GP	Comb	Solo	Ast	Sack	FF	FR	Int	Yds	Avg	Lng	TD	PD
2007	CAR	16	140	106	34	0.0	0	1	1	0	0.0	0	0	6
2008	CAR	16	138	110	28	0.0	0	1	3	52	17.3	44	0	8
2009	CAR	16	142	112	30	3.0	1	2	3	46	15.3	18	0	7
2010	CAR	16	121	90	31	1.0	2	0	1	7	7.0	7	0	8
2011	CAR	1	4	4	0	0.0	0	0	0	0	0.0	0	0	0
2012	CAR	4	28	16	12	0.0	0	0	1	2	2.0	2	0	2
2013	CAR	3	11	7	4	0.0	0	0	0	0	0.0	0	0	0
2013	NYG	12	93	65	28	0.0	0	0	1	9	9.0	9	0	1
2014	NYG	4	11	6	5	0.0	0	0	0	0	0.0	0	0	1
2015	NYG	5	18	11	7	0.0	0	0	0	0	0.0	0	0	0
Career		93	706	527	179	4.0	3	4	10	116	11.6	44	0	33
