= 2008 New York Jets season =

2008 season of NFL team New York Jets

- Owner: Woody & Christopher Johnson
- General manager: Mike Tannenbaum
- Head coach: Eric Mangini
- Home stadium: Giants Stadium

Results
- Record: 9–7
- Division place: 3rd AFC East
- Playoffs: Did not qualify
- All-Pros: RB Thomas Jones (1st team); KR Leon Washington (1st team); G Alan Faneca (2nd team); NT Kris Jenkins (2nd team)
- Pro Bowlers: C Nick Mangold; G Alan Faneca; QB Brett Favre; CB Darrelle Revis; RB Thomas Jones; RB Leon Washington; NT Kris Jenkins

Uniform
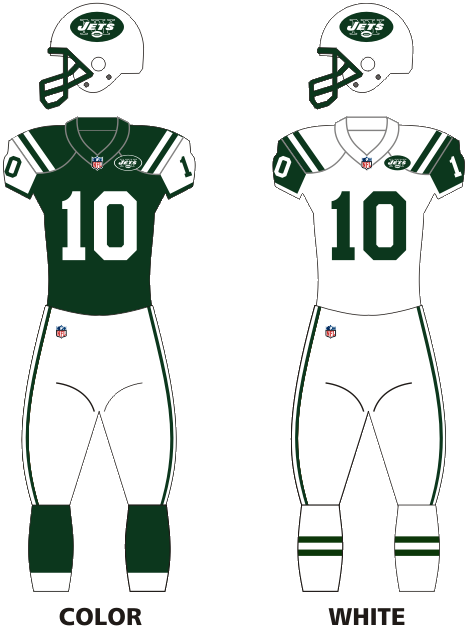

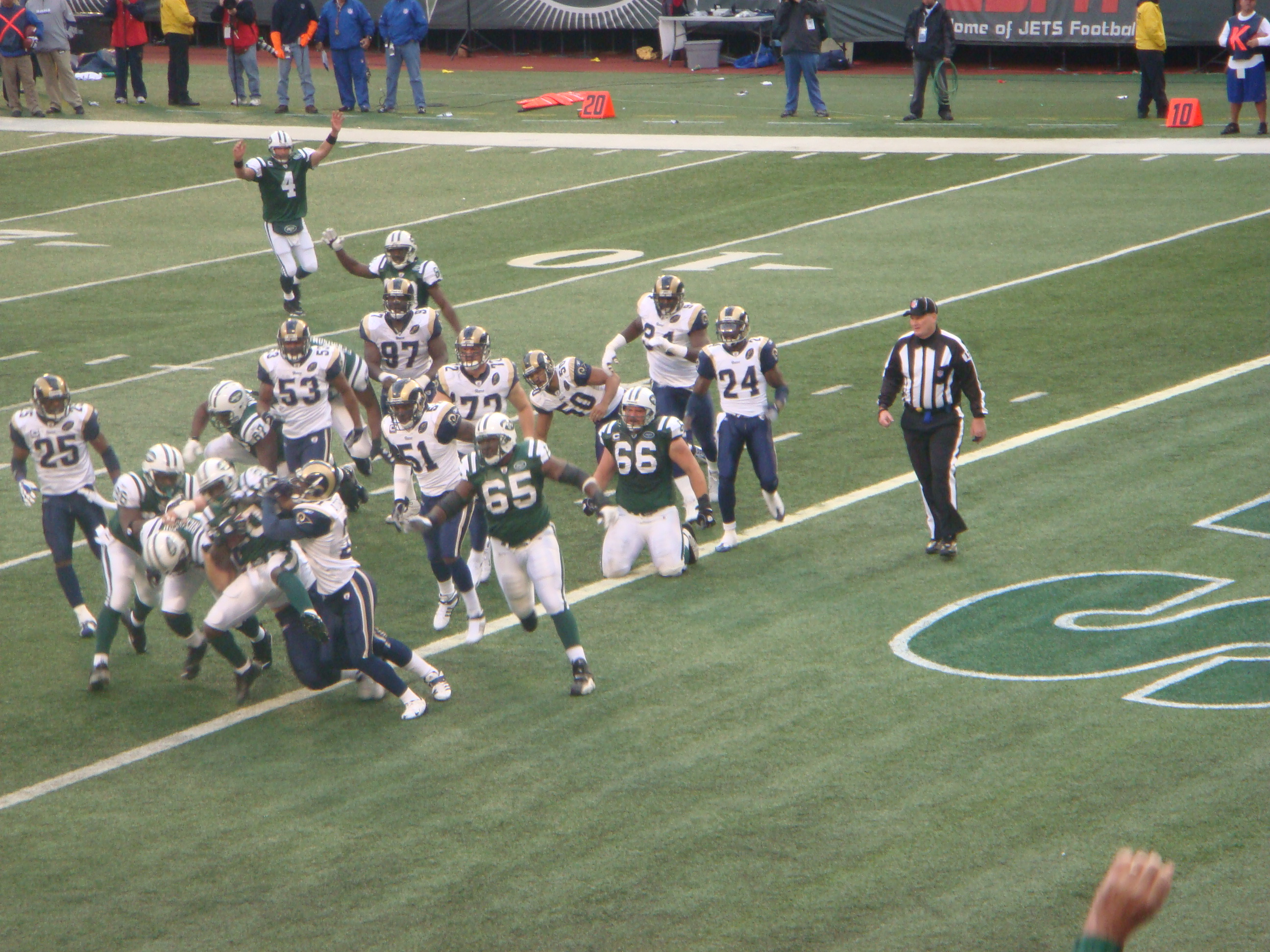
Thomas Jones scores against the St. Louis Rams, November 9, 2008

The 2008 New York Jets season was the franchise's 39th season in the National Football League (NFL), the 49th season overall, and the third and final under head coach Eric Mangini. The team succeeded in improving upon their 4–12 record from 2007, but did not make the playoffs for the second straight season.

== Offseason ==
=== Signings ===
The Jets used a large amount of salary cap room to make several high-profile acquisitions in the offseason. On February 29 the team signed former Pittsburgh Steelers left guard, Alan Faneca, to a five-year, $40 million contract. The deal made Faneca the highest paid offensive lineman in the National Football League. The Jets then signed former Arizona Cardinals linebacker, Calvin Pace, to a six-year, $42 million deal. Pace had 6 ½ sacks in 2007, and was considered to fit well with the Jets' 3–4 defense. The Jets continued to attempt to improve the offensive line by signing Detroit Lions right tackle Damien Woody to a five-year $25.5 million contract.

Other notable free agent signings included fullback, Tony Richardson; cornerbacks, Andre Woolfolk and Ty Law; tight end, Bubba Franks; and running back, Jesse Chatman.

Perhaps the Jets most significant offseason acquisition was veteran and former Green Bay Packers quarterback, Brett Favre. Favre, the NFL's all-time leader in touchdown passes, completions, passing yards, interceptions, wins and consecutive starts by a quarterback at the time of his retirement, was picked up in a trade during training camp.

=== Departures ===
- S Erik Coleman (signed with Atlanta Falcons as an unrestricted free agent)
- TE Sean Ryan (signed with Miami Dolphins as an unrestricted free agent)
- OT Anthony Clement (signed with New England Patriots as an unrestricted free agent)
- CB Andre Dyson (released)
- WR Justin McCareins (signed with Tennessee Titans as an unrestricted free agent)
- QB Chad Pennington (signed with Miami Dolphins as an unrestricted free agent)

=== Trades ===
- Trade 3rd and 5th round draft picks to the Carolina Panthers for DT Kris Jenkins
- Trade LB Jonathan Vilma to the New Orleans Saints for 4th round draft pick.
- Trade DT Dewayne Robertson to the Denver Broncos for a conditional draft pick in the 2009 NFL draft.
- Trade 4th round conditional draft pick in 2009 to the Green Bay Packers for QB Brett Favre.

=== NFL draft ===
2008 New York Jets draft
Round	Pick	Player	Position	College	Notes
1	6	Vernon Gholston	DE	Ohio State	
1	30	Dustin Keller	TE	Purdue	from Green Bay
4	113	Dwight Lowery	CB	San Jose State	from New Orleans via New York Jets and Green Bay
5	162	Erik Ainge	QB	Tennessee	from Green Bay
6	171	Marcus Henry	WR	Kansas	
7	211	Nate Garner	OT	Arkansas	
Made roster

== Staff ==
2008 New York Jets staff
Front office: Owner – Woody Johnson; Head coaches: Head coach – Eric Mangini; Assistant head coach/offensive line – Bill Callahan; Offensive coaches: Offensive coordinator – Brian Schottenheimer; Quarterbacks – Brian Daboll; Running backs – Jimmy Raye; Wide receivers – Noel Mazzone; Assistant offensive line/tight ends – Mike Devlin; Offensive quality control – Brian Smith; Coaching assistant – Dan Shamash	Defensive coaches: Defensive coordinator – Bob Sutton; Defensive line coach – Dan Quinn; Assistant defensive line – Bryan Cox; Linebackers – Jim Herrmann; Defensive backs – Jerome Henderson; Defensive quality control/Coaches’ Assistant – Andy Dickerson; Special teams coaches: Special teams coordinator – Mike Westhoff; Special teams coordinator – Kevin O'Dea; Special teams quality control/defensive quality control – Ben Kotwica; Strength and conditioning: Strength and conditioning – Sal Alosi; Assistant strength and conditioning/nutrition coordinator – Rick Lyle

== Final roster ==
New York Jets 2008 final roster
**Quarterbacks**: 11 Kellen Clemens; 4 **Brett Favre**; 5 Brett Ratliff; **Running backs**: 20 **Thomas Jones**; 49 Tony Richardson FB; 29 **Leon Washington**; **Wide receivers**: 17 David Clowney; 87 Laveranues Coles; 89 Jerricho Cotchery; 16 Brad Smith; 83 Chansi Stuckey; 15 Wallace Wright; **Tight ends**: 86 Chris Baker; 88 Bubba Franks; 81 Dustin Keller	**Offensive linemen**: 66 **Alan Faneca** G; 60 D'Brickashaw Ferguson T; 78 Wayne Hunter T; 74 **Nick Mangold** C; 65 Brandon Moore G; 75 Robert Turner C; 67 Damien Woody T; **Defensive linemen**: 93 Kenyon Coleman DE; 70 Mike DeVito DE; 92 Shaun Ellis DE; 77 **Kris Jenkins** NT; 69 C. J. Mosley DE; 91 Sione Po'uha NT	**Linebackers**: 50 Eric Barton ILB; 96 David Bowens OLB; 56 Vernon Gholston OLB; 52 David Harris ILB; 94 Marques Murrell OLB; 97 Calvin Pace OLB; 53 Cody Spencer ILB; 99 Bryan Thomas OLB; 57 Jason Trusnik OLB; **Defensive backs**: 36 David Barrett CB; 31 Ahmad Carroll CB; 30 Drew Coleman CB; 27 Abram Elam SS; 44 James Ihedigbo FS; 22 Ty Law CB; 34 Dwight Lowery CB; 23 Hank Poteat CB; 32 J. R. Reed SS; 24 **Darrelle Revis** CB; 25 Kerry Rhodes FS; 33 Eric Smith SS; **Special teams**: 85 James Dearth LS; 3 Jay Feely K; 6 Reggie Hodges P; 1 Mike Nugent K	**Reserve lists**: 9 Erik Ainge QB (IR); 22 Jesse Chatman RB (IR); 55 Brad Kassell LB (IR); 35 Danny Woodhead RB (IR); **Practice squad**: 98 Kareem Brown DE; 39 Jehuu Caulcrick FB; 54 Kenwin Cummings LB; 64 Stanley Daniels G; 14 Marcus Henry WR; 61 Ryan Keenan G; 79 Ropati Pitoitua DE (IR); 47 Brandon Renkart LB; 63 Brian Schaefering DE; rookies in italics **Pro Bowlers in bold** 53 active, 5 inactive, 8 practice squad

== Schedule ==
Matchups were determined at the end of the 2007 season based on the league's scheduling formula. Along with home and away games against each of their traditional rivals in the AFC East, the Jets played each of the teams from the AFC West and NFC West divisions, as per the NFL's annual rotation. They also played games against the Tennessee Titans and Cincinnati Bengals, who finished 2007 third in the two remaining AFC divisions. The NFL revealed its schedule for all 256 regular season games on April 15, 2008. One notable game in the schedule was the Jets' first game televised on the NFL Network, against the division rival New England Patriots. Game times from weeks 12 through 17 were subject to change in accordance with the NFL's flexible scheduling policy; two games were affected by this policy.

=== Preseason ===
Week	Date	Opponent	Result	Record	Venue	Recap
1	August 7	at Cleveland Browns	**W** 24–20	1–0	Cleveland Browns Stadium	Recap
2	August 16	Washington Redskins	**L** 10–13	1–1	Giants Stadium	Recap
3	August 23	New York Giants	**W** 10–7	2–1	Giants Stadium	Recap
4	August 28	at Philadelphia Eagles	**W** 27–20	3–1	Lincoln Financial Field	Recap

=== Regular season ===
Week	Date	Opponent	Result	Record	Venue	Recap
1	September 7	at **Miami Dolphins**	**W** 20–14	1–0	Dolphin Stadium	Recap
2	September 14	**New England Patriots**	**L** 10–19	1–1	Giants Stadium	Recap
3	September 22	at San Diego Chargers	**L** 29–48	1–2	Qualcomm Stadium	Recap
4	September 28	Arizona Cardinals	**W** 56–35	2–2	Giants Stadium	Recap
5	Bye					
6	October 12	Cincinnati Bengals	**W** 26–14	3–2	Giants Stadium	Recap
7	October 19	at Oakland Raiders	**L** 13–16 (OT)	3–3	Oakland–Alameda County Coliseum	Recap
8	October 26	Kansas City Chiefs	**W** 28–24	4–3	Giants Stadium	Recap
9	November 2	at **Buffalo Bills**	**W** 26–17	5–3	Ralph Wilson Stadium	Recap
10	November 9	St. Louis Rams	**W** 47–3	6–3	Giants Stadium	Recap
11	November 13	at **New England Patriots**	**W** 34–31 (OT)	7–3	Gillette Stadium	Recap
12	November 23	at Tennessee Titans	**W** 34–13	8–3	LP Field	Recap
13	November 30	Denver Broncos	**L** 17–34	8–4	Giants Stadium	Recap
14	December 7	at San Francisco 49ers	**L** 14–24	8–5	Candlestick Park	Recap
15	December 14	**Buffalo Bills**	**W** 31–27	9–5	Giants Stadium	Recap
16	December 21	at Seattle Seahawks	**L** 3–13	9–6	Qwest Field	Recap
17	December 28	**Miami Dolphins**	**L** 17–24	9–7	Giants Stadium	Recap

Note: Intra-division opponents are in bold text.

== Standings ==
AFC East
	W	L	T	PCT	DIV	CONF	PF	PA	STK
^{(3)} Miami Dolphins	11	5	0	.688	4–2	8–4	345	317	W5
New England Patriots	11	5	0	.688	4–2	7–5	410	309	W4
New York Jets	9	7	0	.563	4–2	7–5	405	356	L2
Buffalo Bills	7	9	0	.438	0–6	5–7	336	342	L1

== Regular season results ==
=== Week 1: at Miami Dolphins ===
Quarter	1	2	3	4	Total
Jets	7	6	7	0	20
Dolphins	0	7	0	7	14

at Dolphin Stadium, Miami Gardens, Florida

- Game time: 1:00 PM EDT
- Game weather: 88 °F or 31.1 °C (Mostly Sunny)
- Game attendance: 65,859
- Referee: Mike Carey
- TV announcers (CBS): Jim Nantz and Phil Simms

==== Game summary ====
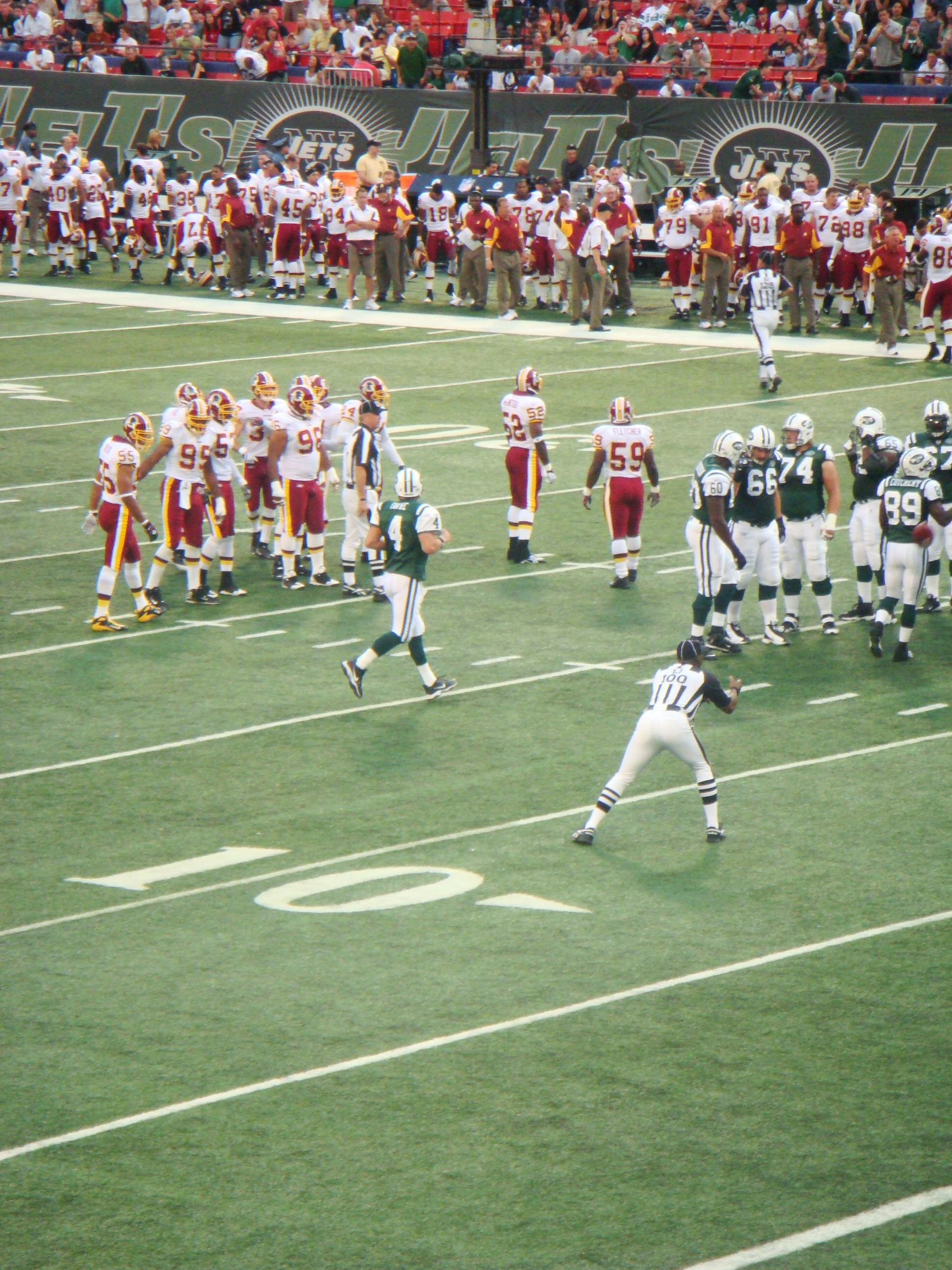
Brett Favre and the Jets in their preseason matchup against the Washington Redskins, August 16

The Jets started with quarterback Brett Favre against a Miami Dolphins team that was sporting new starting quarterback and former Jets starting quarterback Chad Pennington. Favre got the Jets on the scoreboard first in the first quarter with a play-action pass that found Jerricho Cotchery at the 10-yard line en route to a 56-yard touchdown. However, Mike Nugent sprained his thigh on the following kickoff, and when he attempted and missed a 32-yard field goal attempt, Nugent was brought out of the game. Miami then responded, with Chad Pennington marching the Dolphins down to the 6-yard line. From there, Pennington connected with Anthony Fasano for a 5-yard touchdown, tying the game. On the following drive for the Jets, coach Eric Mangini, faced with the possibility of missing a 40-yard field goal if he allowed an uncertain Mike Nugent to kick the ball, opted for Favre to continue on 4th down and 13 yards. Favre, under pressure, threw up a high ball and rookie Chansi Stuckey jumped up for the catch in the end zone, giving the Jets a 13–7 lead. Rather than put Nugent out to the field for a PAT, Mangini opted to go for two points, but the option failed.

In the 3rd quarter, Favre brought the Jets back to the red zone, moving them to the 6-yard line. From there, Favre handed off the ball to Thomas Jones, who ran in for the touchdown. Along with an extra point from Mike Nugent, the Jets now had a 20–7 lead. Due to miscommunication, Chad Pennington was forced to use two time-outs early in the 4th quarter. Late in the 4th quarter, Pennington moved Miami down the field, including connecting on a 14-yard pass from 4th-and-7 at midfield. Pennington completed an 11-yard touchdown pass to David Martin with 3:27 remaining, cutting the Jets' lead to 6 points. The Jets, who ran the clock down to the two-minute warning, went three-and-out on their drive, giving the ball back to Miami at their 34-yard line with 1:53 remaining. Pennington moved the team down the field, getting to the 18-yard line with 18 seconds on the clock. On 3rd-and-10 from the 18-yard line, Pennington attempted a throw to Ted Ginn Jr. in the back of the end zone, but it was intercepted by Darrelle Revis, sealing the six-point win for the Jets.

With the win, the Jets began their 2008 season at 1–0.

Brett Favre, in his Jets debut, completed 15 of 22 passes for 194 yards and 2 touchdowns (with a passer rating of 125.9).

==== Scoring summary ====
Scoring summary
Q	Team	Time	Scoring play		Extra point	Score	
1	NYJ	08:42	TD	Jerricho Cotchery, 56 pass from Brett Favre	Mike Nugent kick	7	7–0
2	MIA	12:41	TD	Anthony Fasano, 5 pass from Chad Pennington	Dan Carpenter kick	7	7–7
2	NYJ	14:52	TD	Chansi Stuckey, 22 pass from Brett Favre		6	13–7
3	NYJ	01:08	TD	Thomas Jones, 6 run	Mike Nugent kick	7	20–7
4	MIA	09:28	TD	David Martin, 11 pass from Chad Pennington	Dan Carpenter kick	7	20–14

=== Week 2: vs. New England Patriots ===
Quarter	1	2	3	4	Total
Patriots	3	3	10	3	19
Jets	0	3	0	7	10

at Giants Stadium, East Rutherford, New Jersey

- Game time: 4:15 PM EDT
- Game weather: 90 °F or 32.2 °C (Partly Cloudy)
- Game attendance: 78,554
- Referee: John Parry
- TV announcers (CBS): Jim Nantz and Phil Simms

==== Game summary ====
Coming off their divisional road win over the Dolphins, the Jets played their Week 2 home opener against their AFC East foe, the New England Patriots. The Jets had the first opportunity to score in the first quarter, but a 31-yard field goal attempt by new kicker Jay Feely was wide right. New York then trailed as Patriots kicker Stephen Gostkowski got a 21-yard field goal. In the second quarter, the Jets continued to trail as Gostkowski kicked a 37-yard field goal. Brett Favre got the Jets down to the 3-yard line, but after three running plays resulting in 0 net yardage, the Jets settled for a 21-yard field goal to get on the board.

In the third quarter, New England capitalized on an interception by Brandon Meriweather off a Brett Favre pass. The Patriots increased its lead 6 plays later as RB Sammy Morris got a 1-yard TD run and Gostkowski nailed a 28-yard field goal. In the fourth quarter, the Jets tried to rally as QB Brett Favre completed a 2-yard TD pass to WR Chansi Stuckey. However, the Patriots pulled away with Gostkowski's 27-yard field goal.

With the loss, New York fell to 1–1.

==== Scoring summary ====
Scoring summary
Q	Team	Time	Scoring play		Extra point	Score	
1	NE	03:00	FG	Stephen Gostkowski, 21 yd field goal		3	3–0
2	NE	13:16	FG	Stephen Gostkowski, 37 yd field goal		3	6–0
2	NYJ	07:28	FG	Jay Feely, 21 yd field goal		3	6–3
3	NE	06:20	TD	Sammy Morris, 1 yd run	Stephen Gostkowski kick	7	13–3
3	NE	00:17	FG	Stephen Gostkowski, 28 yd field goal		3	16–3
4	NYJ	10:18	TD	Chansi Stuckey, 2 yd pass from Brett Favre	Jay Feely kick	7	16–10
4	NE	05:18	FG	Stephen Gostkowski, 27 yd field goal		3	19–10

=== Week 3: at San Diego Chargers ===
Quarter	1	2	3	4	Total
Jets	7	7	0	15	29
Chargers	10	21	7	10	48

at Qualcomm Stadium, San Diego, California

- Game time: 8:30 PM EDT/5:30 PM PDT
- Game weather: 71 °F or 21.7 °C (Sunny)
- Game attendance: 68,922
- Referee: Peter Morelli
- TV announcers (ESPN): Mike Tirico, Ron Jaworski, and Tony Kornheiser

==== Game summary ====
Hoping to rebound from their divisional home loss to the Patriots, the Jets flew to Qualcomm Stadium for a Week 3 MNF duel with the San Diego Chargers. In the first quarter, New York took flight as CB David Barrett returned an interception 25 yards for a touchdown. The Chargers responded with kicker Nate Kaeding getting a 36-yard field goal, along with QB Philip Rivers completing a 1-yard TD pass to FB Mike Tolbert. In the second quarter, San Diego increased its lead with CB Antonio Cromartie returning an interception 52 yards for a touchdown. The Jets answered with QB Brett Favre completing a 3-yard TD pass to WR Laveranues Coles. The turning point in the game occurred on the following kickoff, an on-side kick, which traveled only 15 yards before the Chargers picked up the ball. They then added a touchdown, with Rivers completing a 27-yard TD pass to WR Chris Chambers. Following another interception, the Chargers scored again with a 6-yard TD pass to TE Antonio Gates.

In the third quarter, San Diego increased its lead with RB LaDainian Tomlinson getting a 2-yard TD run. New York then managed to move the ball down to the San Diego 9-yard line, but turned the ball over on downs. In the fourth quarter, New York tried to rally as Favre completed a 4-yard TD pass to WR Chansi Stuckey (with a failed 2-point conversion), along with kicker Jay Feely getting a 32-yard field goal, yet the Chargers answered with Tomlinson's 2-yard TD run. Afterwards, the Jets tried to make yet another comeback attempt as Jerricho Cotchery ran a return ball 54 yards. Favre completed a 13-yard TD pass to TE Dustin Keller to put them within 2 touchdowns from tying, yet San Diego sealed the win with Kaeding's 49-yard field goal with 2:08 left in the game.

With the loss, New York fell to 1–2.

==== Scoring summary ====
Scoring summary
Q	Team	Time	Scoring play		Extra point	Score	
1	NYJ	11:27	TD	David Barrett, 25 yd interception return	Jay Feely, kick	7	7–0
1	SD	05:47	FG	Nate Kaeding, 36 yd field goal		3	7–3
1	SD	02:03	TD	Mike Tolbert, 1-yard pass from Philip Rivers	Nate Kaeding kick	7	7–10
2	SD	14:48	TD	Antonio Cromartie, 52 yd interception return	Nate Kaeding kick	7	7–17
2	NYJ	13:50	TD	Laveranues Coles, 3 yd pass from Brett Favre	Jay Feely kick	7	14–17
2	SD	11:17	TD	Chris Chambers, 27 yd pass from Philip Rivers	Nate Kaeding kick	7	14–24
2	SD	03:17	TD	Antonio Gates, 6 yd pass from Philip Rivers	Nate Kaeding Kick	7	14–31
3	SD	10:36	TD	LaDainian Tomlinson, 2 yd run	Nate Kaeding kick	7	14–38
4	NYJ	10:30	TD	Chansi Stuckey, 4 yd pass from Brett Favre		6	20–38
4	NYJ	08:21	FG	Jay Feely, 32 yd field goal		3	23–38
4	SD	05:18	TD	LaDainian Tomlinson, 2 yd run	Nate Kaeding kick	7	23–45
4	NYJ	03:09	TD	Dustin Keller, 13 yd pass from Brett Favre		6	29–45
4	SD	05:18	FG	Nate Kaeding, 49 yd field goal		3	29–48

=== Week 4: vs. Arizona Cardinals ===
Quarter	1	2	3	4	Total
Cardinals	0	0	21	14	35
Jets	0	34	0	22	56

at Giants Stadium, East Rutherford, New Jersey

- Game time: 1:00 PM EDT
- Game weather: 69 °F or 20.6 °C (Overcast)
- Game attendance: 78,222
- Referee: Scott Green
- TV announcers (Fox): Dick Stockton, Brian Baldinger and Brian Billick

==== Game summary ====
Hoping to rebound from a tough Monday Night Football road loss to the Chargers, the Jets went home, donned their New York Titans throwbacks, and played a Week 4 interconference duel with the Arizona Cardinals. After a scoreless first quarter, New York would begin their explosive second quarter. It began with QB Brett Favre completing a 12-yard TD pass to WR Laveranues Coles. It continued with CB Darrelle Revis returning an interception 32 yards for a touchdown. Afterwards, New York kept its domination going with Favre completing a 34-yard TD pass to Coles, kicker Jay Feely getting a 20-yard field goal, Favre and Coles hooking up with each other for a third time on a 2-yard TD pass, and Feely kicking a 30-yard field goal.

In the third quarter, the Cardinals started to rally as RB Edgerrin James got a 4-yard and a 2-yard TD run, while RB Tim Hightower got a 1-yard TD run. In the fourth quarter, the Jets answered with Favre completing a 17-yard TD pass to WR Jerricho Cotchery. Arizona replied with QB Kurt Warner completing an 8-yard TD pass to WR Anquan Boldin, yet New York continued its victory march as Favre completed a 40-yard TD pass to Cotchery. The Cardinals tried to come back as Warner completing a 14-yard TD pass to WR Jerheme Urban, yet the Jets were able to close out the game as Favre threw his career-best sixth touchdown pass to rookie TE Dustin Keller from 24 yards out. In the final minute, Anquan Boldin suffered fractured paranasal sinuses as a result of a helmet-to-helmet collision. After witnessing the injury, Kurt Warner considered retirement, but remained to lead the Cardinals to Super Bowl XLIII.

With the amazing win, New York went into the bye week at 2–2.

The Jets' 34-second quarter points became a franchise record for the most points in any given quarter. The defense was also impressive with 5 sacks and 7 turnovers. Also, heading into the game, Favre was listed as questionable, due to an injury from Monday Night Football. He improved to 6–1 in career games where he's listed as questionable.

==== Scoring summary ====
Scoring summary
Q	Team	Time	Scoring play		Extra point	Score	
1	No scoring plays						
2	NYJ	14:44	TD	Laveranues Coles, 12 yd pass from Brett Favre	Jay Feely kick	7	0–7
2	NYJ	13:25	TD	Darrelle Revis, 32 yd interception return	Jay Feely kick	7	0–14
2	NYJ	07:17	TD	Laveranues Coles, 34 yd pass from Brett Favre	Jay Feely kick	7	0–21
2	NYJ	03:32	FG	Jay Feely, 20 yd field goal		3	0–24
2	NYJ	00:10	TD	Laveranues Coles, 2 yd pass from Brett Favre	Jay Feely Kick	7	0–31
2	NYJ	00:00	FG	Jay Feely, 30 yd field goal		3	0–34
3	ARI	12:39	TD	Edgerrin James, 4 yd run	Neil Rackers kick	7	7–34
3	ARI	05:41	TD	Edgerrin James, 2 yd run	Edgerrin James run	8	15–34
3	ARI	02:50	TD	Tim Hightower, 1 yd run		6	21–34
4	NYJ	11:50	TD	Jerricho Cotchery, 17 yd pass from Brett Favre	Jay Feely kick	7	21–41
4	ARI	09:49	TD	Anquan Boldin, 8 yd pass from Kurt Warner	Neil Rackers kick	7	28–41
4	NYJ	07:26	TD	Jerricho Cotchery, 40 yd pass from Brett Favre	Jay Feely kick	7	28–48
4	ARI	02:37	TD	Jerheme Urban, 14 yd pass from Kurt Warner	Neil Rackers kick	7	35–48
4	NYJ	01:54	TD	Dustin Keller, 24 yd pass from Brett Favre	Leon Washington run	8	35–56

=== Week 6: vs. Cincinnati Bengals ===
Quarter	1	2	3	4	Total
Bengals	7	7	0	0	14
Jets	7	10	3	6	26

at Giants Stadium, East Rutherford, New Jersey

- Game time: 1:00 PM EDT
- Game weather: 67 °F or 19.4 °C (Clear)
- Game attendance: 78,161
- Referee: Gene Steratore
- TV announcers (CBS): Dick Enberg, Randy Cross, and Dan Fouts

Coming off their bye week, the Jets stayed at home, donned their New York Titans throwbacks again, and played a Week 6 duel with the winless Cincinnati Bengals. In the first quarter, the Jets trailed early as Bengals strong safety Chinedum Ndukwe returned a fumble 15 yards for a touchdown. New York would respond with QB Brett Favre completing a 2-yard TD pass to RB Thomas Jones. In the second quarter, the Jets took the lead as kicker Jay Feely got a 38-yard field goal, while Jones got a 7-yard TD run. Cincinnati closed out the half with QB Ryan Fitzpatrick getting a 1-yard TD run.

In the third quarter, New York began to pull away as Feely nailed a 43-yard field goal. In the fourth quarter, the Jets closed the game out with Jones getting a 1-yard TD run (with a failed 2-point conversion).

With the win, New York improved to 3–2.

==== Scoring summary ====
Scoring summary
Q	Team	Time	Scoring play		Extra point	Score	
1	CIN	13:36	TD	Chinedum Ndukwe, 15 yd fumble	Dave Rayner kick	7	7–0
1	NYJ	07:44	TD	Thomas Jones, 2 yd pass from Brett Favre	Jay Feely kick	7	7–7
2	NYJ	10:56	FG	Jay Feely, 38 yd field goal		3	7–10
2	NYJ	07:57	TD	Thomas Jones, 7 yd run	Jay Feely kick	7	7–17
2	CIN	00:08	TD	Ryan Fitzpatrick, 1 yd run	Dave Rayner kick	7	14–17
3	NYJ	05:36	FG	Jay Feely, 43 yd field goal		3	14–20
4	NYJ	09:28	TD	Thomas Jones, 1 yd run		6	14–26

=== Week 7: at Oakland Raiders ===
Quarter	1	2	3	4	OT	Total
Jets	3	0	0	10	0	13
Raiders	3	0	7	3	3	16

at Oakland–Alameda County Coliseum, Oakland, California

- Game time: 4:15 PM EDT/1:15 PM PDT
- Game weather: 59 °F or 15 °C (Partly cloudy)
- Game attendance: 61,901
- Referee: Jerome Boger
- TV announcers (CBS): Dick Enberg, Randy Cross, and Dan Fouts

Coming off their home win over the Bengals, the Jets flew to Oakland–Alameda County Coliseum for a Week 7 duel with the Oakland Raiders, Brett Favre's first trip to the stadium since a 2003 Monday night game played in the aftermath of his father's death. In the first quarter, New York took flight as kicker Jay Feely got a 40-yard field goal. The Raiders responded with kicker Sebastian Janikowski getting a 29-yard field goal. After a scoreless second quarter, Oakland took the lead as QB JaMarcus Russell completed an 8-yard TD pass to WR Javon Walker. In the fourth quarter, the Jets answered with RB Leon Washington getting an 11-yard TD run. The Raiders regained their lead as Janikowski got a 37-yard field goal. Favre orchestrated a remarkable final drive, culminating in a Feely 52-yard field goal with just 3 seconds left that sent the game into overtime. The Jets nearly won in regulation, but Jerricho Cotchery was tripped up by the last Oakland defender, preventing what would have been a game-winning touchdown. Oakland prevailed in overtime, as Janikowski nailed the game-ending 57-yard field goal, which holds the NFL record for longest FG converted in Overtime.

With the loss, the Jets fell to 3–3.

==== Scoring summary ====
Scoring summary
Q	Team	Time	Scoring play		Extra point	Score	
1	NYJ	11:41	FG	Jay Feely, 40 yd field goal		3	3–0
1	OAK	01:49	FG	Sebastian Janikowski, 29 yd field goal		3	3–3
2	No scoring plays						
3	OAK	09:35	TD	Javon Walker, 8 yd pass from JaMarcus Russell	Sebastian Janikowski kick	7	3–10
4	NYJ	08:00	TD	Leon Washington, 11 yd run	Jay Feely kick	7	10–10
4	OAK	02:56	FG	Sebastian Janikowski, 37 yd field goal		3	10–13
4	NYJ	00:03	FG	Jay Feely, 52 yd field goal		3	13–13
OT	OAK	02:30	FG	Sebastian Janikowski, 57 yd field goal		3	13–16

=== Week 8: vs. Kansas City Chiefs ===
Quarter	1	2	3	4	Total
Chiefs	0	14	3	7	24
Jets	7	7	7	7	28

at Giants Stadium, East Rutherford, New Jersey

- Game time: 1:00 PM EDT
- Game weather: 59 °F or 15 °C (Clear)
- Game attendance: 78,037
- Referee: Pete Morelli
- TV announcers (CBS): Greg Gumbel and Dan Dierdorf

Hoping to rebound from their tough overtime road loss to the Raiders, the Jets went home for a Week 8 duel with the Kansas City Chiefs. In the first quarter, New York took flight as QB Brett Favre completed an 18-yard TD pass to RB Leon Washington. In the second quarter, the Chiefs tied the game as QB Tyler Thigpen completed a 19-yard TD pass to TE Tony Gonzalez. The Jets would answer with Washington getting a 60-yard TD run. Kansas City closed out the half as Thigpen completed an 11-yard TD pass to WR Mark Bradley.

In the third quarter, the Chiefs took the lead as kicker Connor Barth nailed a 30-yard field goal, yet New York replied with RB Thomas Jones getting a 1-yard TD run. In the fourth quarter, Kansas City got the lead again as CB Brandon Flowers returned an interception 91 yards for a touchdown. Fortunately, the Jets pulled out the win with Favre completing the game-winning 15-yard TD pass to WR Laveranues Coles.

With the win, New York improved to 4–3.

During halftime, the Jets celebrated the 40th anniversary of their Super Bowl III championship team.

==== Scoring summary ====
Scoring summary
Q	Team	Time	Scoring play		Extra point	Score	
1	NYJ	08:57	TD	Leon Washington, 18 yd pass from Brett Favre	Jay Feely kick	7	7–0
2	KC	13:58	TD	Tony Gonzalez, 19 yd pass from Tyler Thigpen	Connor Barth kick	7	7–7
2	NYJ	01:57	TD	Leon Washington, 60 yd run	Jay Feely kick	7	14–7
2	KC	00:10	TD	Mark Bradley, 11 yd pass from Tyler Thigpen	Connor Barth kick	7	14–14
3	KC	09:56	FG	Connor Barth, 30 yd field goal		3	14–17
3	NYJ	00:52	TD	Thomas Jones, 1 yd run	Jay Feely kick	7	21–17
4	KC	09:29	TD	Brandon Flowers, 91 yd interception return	Connor Barth kick	7	21–24
4	NYJ	01:05	TD	Laveranues Coles, 15 yd pass from Brett Favre	Jay Feely kick	7	28–24

=== Week 9: at Buffalo Bills ===
Quarter	1	2	3	4	Total
Jets	13	0	10	3	26
Bills	7	0	3	7	17

at Ralph Wilson Stadium, Orchard Park, New York

- Game time: 1:00 PM EST
- Game weather: 49 °F or 9.4 °C (Sunny)
- Game attendance: 71,827
- Referee: Ron Winter
- TV announcers (CBS): Jim Nantz and Phil Simms

Coming off their home win over the Chiefs, the Jets flew to Ralph Wilson Stadium for a Week 9 AFC East duel with the Buffalo Bills. In the first quarter, New York took flight early as kicker Jay Feely getting a 37-yard field goal. The Bills answered with QB Trent Edwards completing a 9-yard TD pass to TE Derek Fine. Afterwards, the Jets regained the lead as Feely got a 26-yard field goal, along with safety Abram Elam returning an interception 92 yards for a touchdown. After a scoreless second quarter, New York kicked off the third quarter with Feely making a 20-yard field goal. Buffalo would respond with kicker Rian Lindell getting a 53-yard field goal, yet New York replied with RB Thomas Jones getting a 7-yard TD run. In the fourth quarter, the Bills tried to rally as CB Jabari Greer returned QB Brett Favre's 300th career interception 42 yards for a touchdown. Favre subsequently led the Jets downfield on a seven-minute drive, resulting in a 31-yard field goal from Feely to put the game out of reach for Buffalo.

With the win, not only did New York improve to 5–3, but Favre also earned his first win at Ralph Wilson Stadium after going 0–3 in his previous three visits with Green Bay.

==== Scoring summary ====
Scoring summary
Q	Team	Time	Scoring play		Extra point	Score	
1	NYJ	13:17	FG	Jay Feely, 37 yd field goal		3	3–0
1	BUF	11:32	TD	Derek Fine, 9 yd pass from Trent Edwards	Rian Lindell kick	3	3–7
1	NYJ	11:32	FG	Jay Feely, 26 yd field goal		3	6–7
1	NYJ	00:15	TD	Abram Elam, 92 yd interception return	Jay Feely kick	7	13–7
2	No scoring plays						
3	NYJ	08:57	FG	Jay Feely, 20 yd field goal		3	16–7
3	BUF	03:38	FG	Rian Lindell, 53 yd field goal		3	16–10
3	NYJ	01:12	TD	Thomas Jones, 7 yd run	Jay Feely kick	7	23–10
4	BUF	11:05	TD	Jabari Greer, 42 yd interception return	Rian Lindell kick	7	23–17
4	NYJ	02:16	FG	Jay Feely, 31 yd field goal		3	26–17

=== Week 10: vs. St. Louis Rams ===
Quarter	1	2	3	4	Total
Rams	0	0	3	0	3
Jets	17	23	0	7	47

at Giants Stadium, East Rutherford, New Jersey

- Game time: 1:00 PM EST
- Game weather: 53 °F or 11.7 °C (Sunny)
- Game attendance: 78,073
- Referee: Bill Carollo
- TV announcers (Fox): Kenny Albert, Daryl Johnston, and Tony Siragusa

Coming off their road win over the Bills, the Jets went home for Week 10 interconference duel with the St. Louis Rams. In the first quarter, New York took flight as RB Thomas Jones got a 13-yard TD run, kicker Jay Feely nailed a 22-yard field goal, and LB Calvin Pace returning a fumble 50 yards for a touchdown. In the second quarter, the Jets continued their domination as Jones got a 2-yard TD run, Feely making a 49-yard and a 46-yard field goal, QB Brett Favre completing a 2-yard TD pass to TE Dustin Keller, and Feely getting a 55-yard field goal. In the third quarter, the Rams would get only points of the game as kicker Josh Brown nailed a 37-yard field goal. In the fourth quarter, New York flew away as Jones got a 6-yard TD run.

With the huge win, the Jets improved to 6–3, snapped their seven-game losing streak against the Rams and beat them for the first time since the 1983 season.

The +44 point differential marked the largest margin of victory in franchise history.

==== Scoring summary ====
Scoring summary
Q	Team	Time	Scoring play		Extra point	Score	
1	NYJ	10:35	TD	Thomas Jones, 13 yd run	Jay Feely kick	7	7–0
1	NYJ	06:59	FG	Jay Feely, 22 yd field goal		3	10–0
1	NYJ	04:59	TD	Calvin Pace, 50 yd fumble	Jay Feely kick	7	17–0
2	NYJ	12:09	TD	Thomas Jones, 2 yd run	Jay Feely kick	7	24–0
2	NYJ	06:58	FG	Jay Feely, 49 yd field goal		3	27–0
2	NYJ	04:00	FG	Jay Feely, 46 yd field goal		3	30–0
2	NYJ	00:35	TD	Dustin Keller, 1 yd pass from Brett Favre	Jay Feely kick	7	37–0
2	NYJ	00:03	FG	Jay Feely, 55 yd field goal		3	40–0
3	STL	09:56	FG	Josh Brown, 37 yd field goal		3	40–3
4	NYJ	15:51	TD	Thomas Jones, 6 yd run	Jay Feely kick	7	47–3

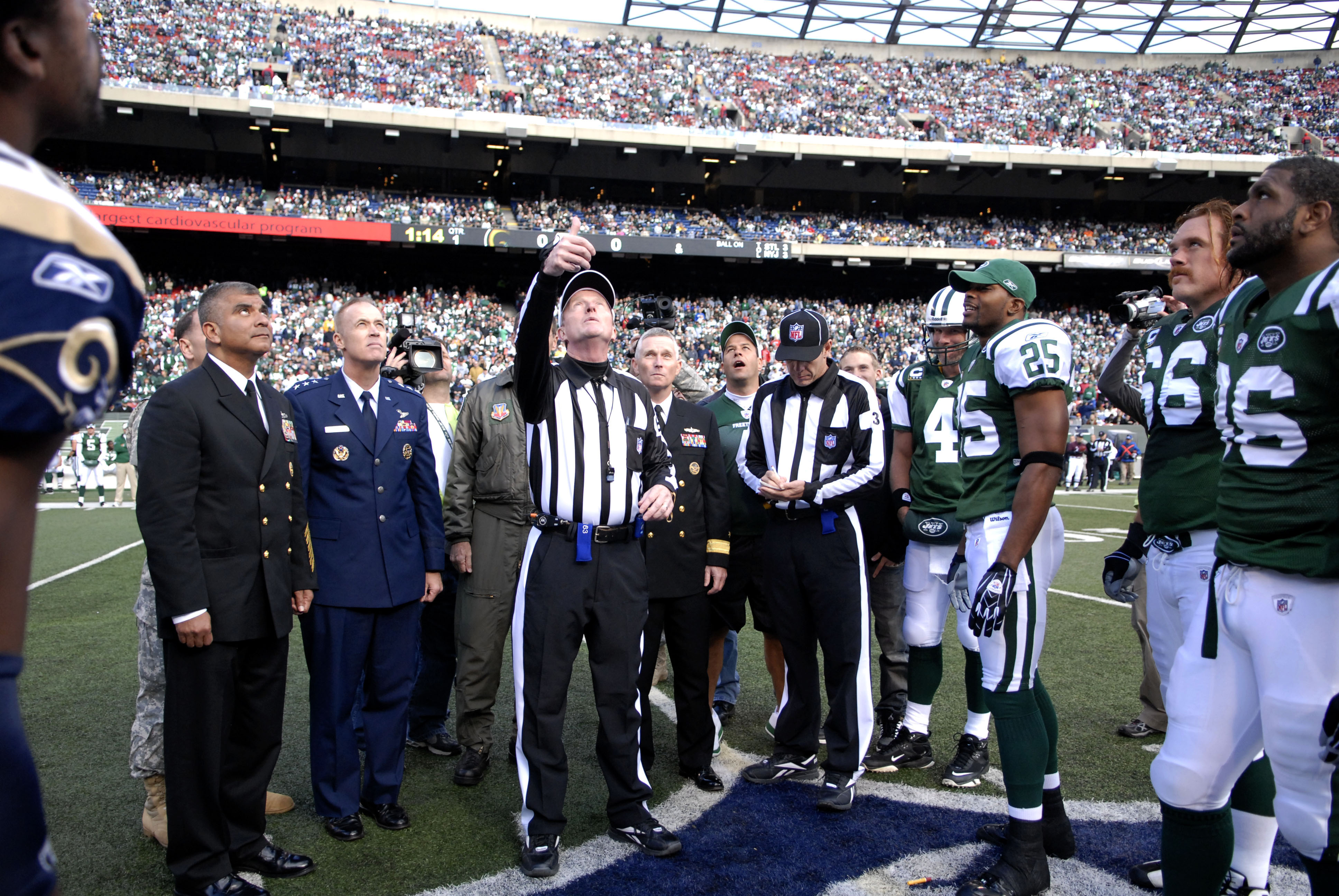
Coin toss before the Rams-Jets game

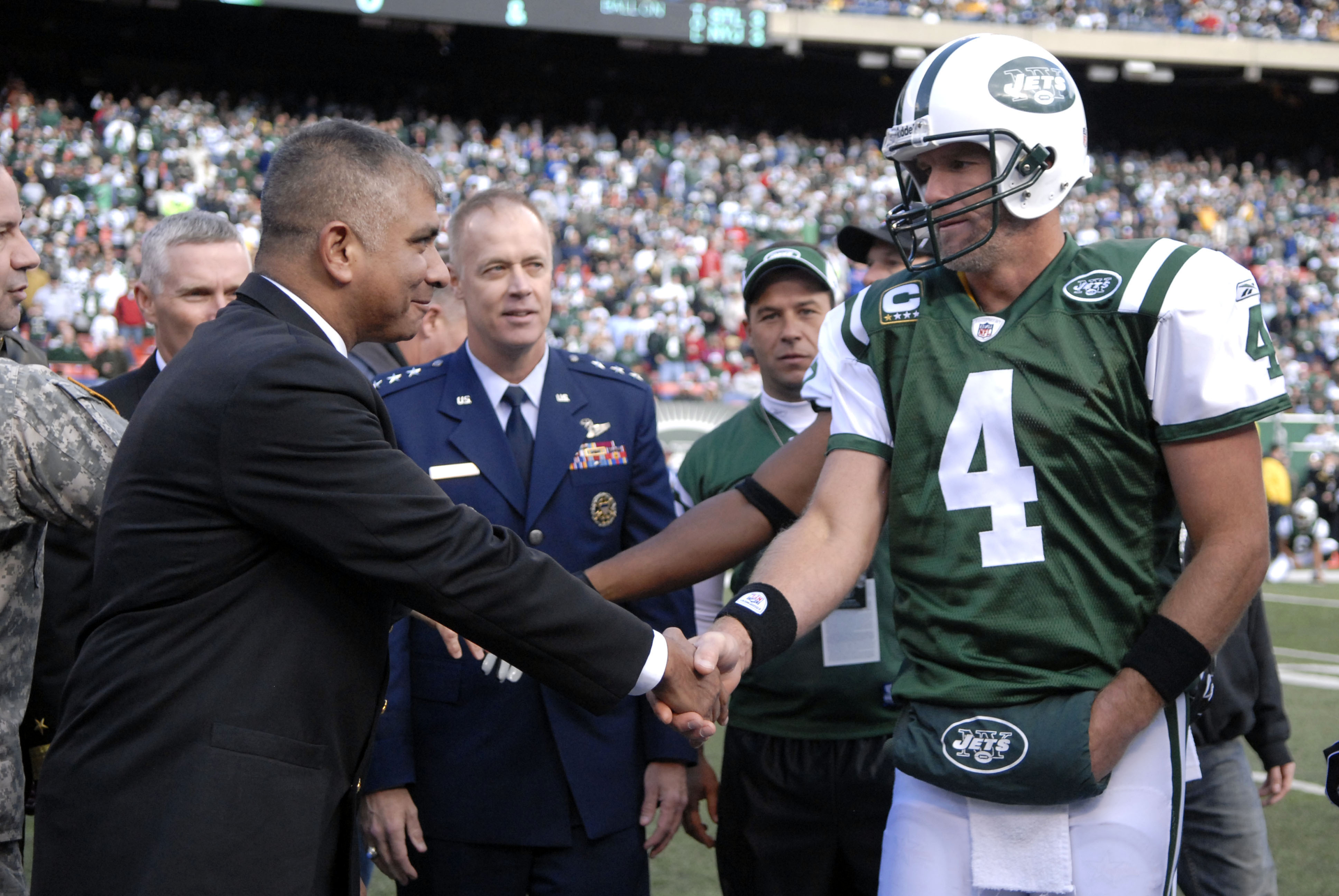
Joe R. Campa and Brett Favre before the game

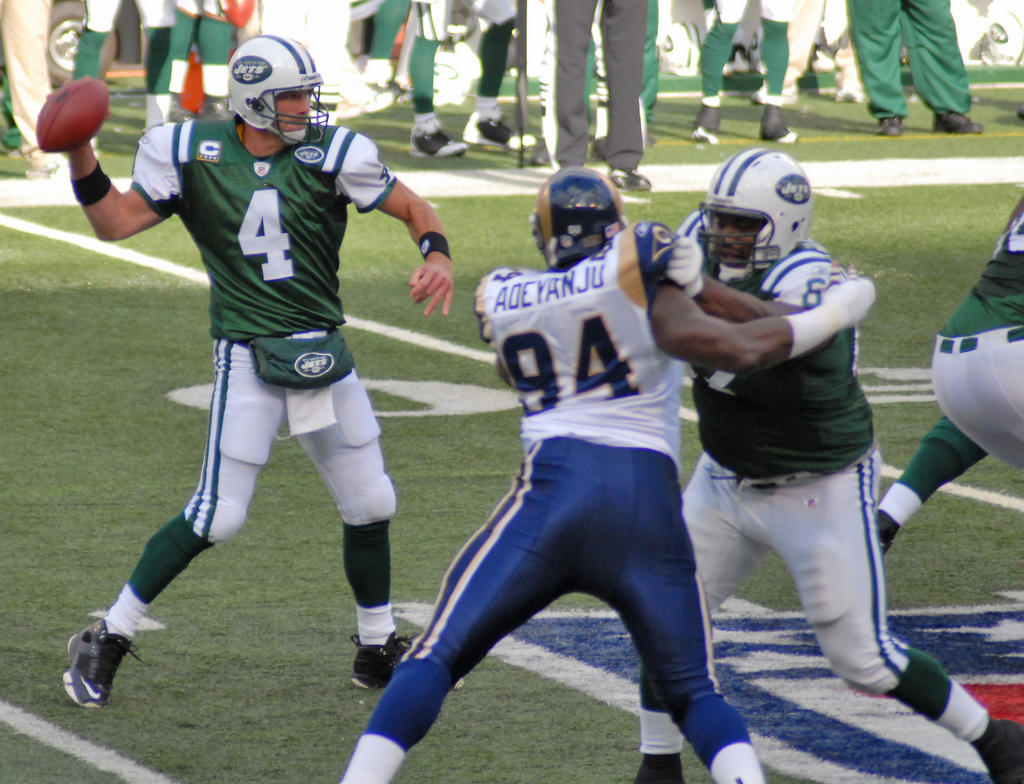
Favre passes against St. Louis

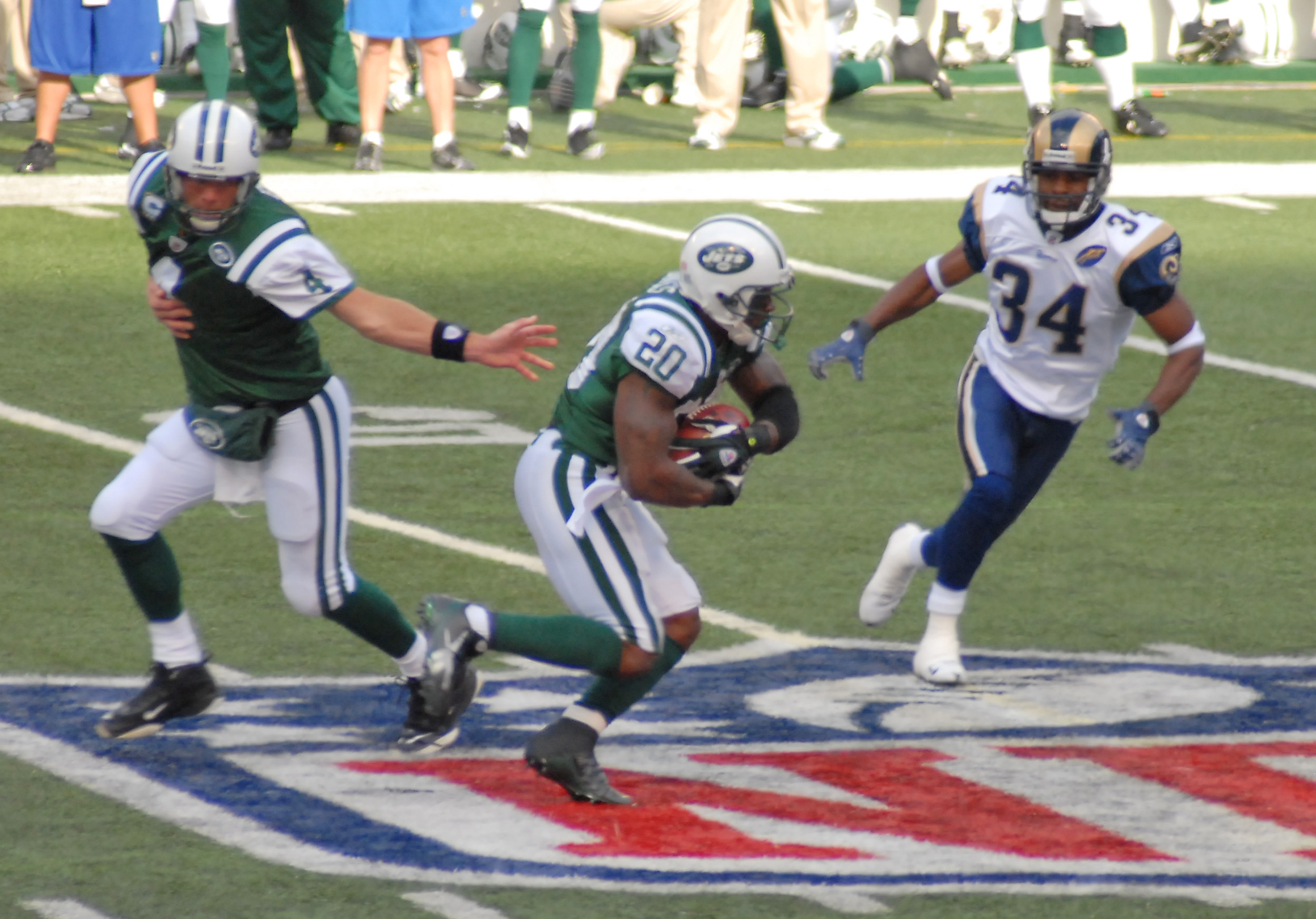
Handoff to Thomas Jones

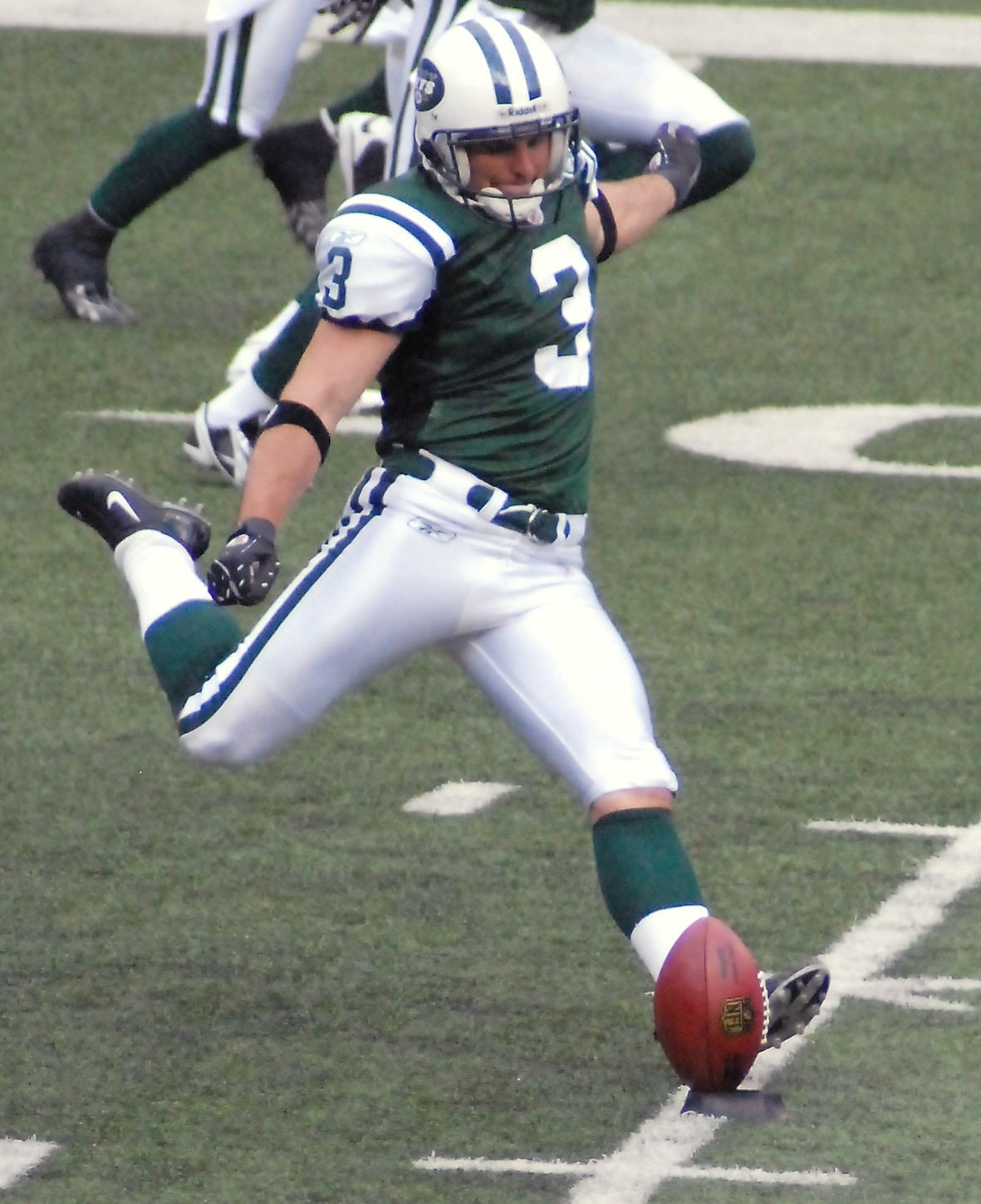
Jay Feely kicks off

=== Week 11: at New England Patriots ===
Quarter	1	2	3	4	OT	Total
Jets	10	14	0	7	3	34
Patriots	3	10	8	10	0	31

at Gillette Stadium, Foxborough, Massachusetts

- Game time: 8:15 PM EST
- Game weather: 44 °F or 6.7 °C (Cloudy)
- Game attendance: 68,756
- Referee: Gene Steratore
- TV announcers (NFLN): Bob Papa and Cris Collinsworth

Coming off their dominating home win over the Rams, the Jets flew to Gillette Stadium for a Week 11 AFC East rematch with the New England Patriots on Thursday Night Football. In the first quarter, New York took flight as QB Brett Favre completed a 7-yard TD pass to RB Leon Washington. The Patriots would respond with kicker Stephen Gostkowski getting a 42-yard field goal. The Jets would increase their lead as kicker Jay Feely made a 22-yard field goal. In the second quarter, New England would answer with Gostkowski making a 31-yard field goal, yet New York immediately replied as Washington returned the kickoff 92 yards for a touchdown. Later, the Jets added onto their lead as Favre completed a 15-yard TD pass to WR Jerricho Cotchery to give the Jets a commanding 24–6 lead. The Patriots would get back into the game by closing out the half with a QB Matt Cassel 19-yard TD pass to WR Jabar Gaffney.

In the third quarter, New England hacked away at New York's lead as Cassel completed a 10-yard TD pass to TE Benjamin Watson (along with a 2-point conversion pass to Gaffney) on the final play of the 3rd quarter. In the fourth quarter, the Patriots completely erased the Jets' 18-point lead with Gostkowski kicking a 47-yard field goal. New York would answer with RB Thomas Jones getting a 1-yard TD run, but New England tied the game with Cassel completing a 16-yard TD pass to WR Randy Moss, who had beaten Ty Law as time expired. In overtime, the Jets took the kickoff and marched straight down the field to win on Feely's 34-yard field goal. The drive included some clutch throws by Favre, particularly a connection with Dustin Keller on 3rd-and-17 from deep in the Jets' zone. It was Favre's 42nd game-winning drive in the fourth quarter or overtime in his career. Washington was selected as AFC special teams player of the week for the first time in his career. His 92-yard touchdown was the fourth kick return TD of his career, surpassing Justin Miller for the club record.

With the win, New York improved to 7–3.

==== Scoring summary ====
Scoring summary
Q	Team	Time	Scoring play		Extra point	Score	
1	NYJ	09:32	TD	Leon Washington, 7 yd pass from Brett Favre	Jay Feely kick	7	7–0
1	NE	04:31	FG	Stephen Gostkowski, 42 yd field goal		3	7–3
1	NYJ	00:10	FG	Jay Feely, 22 yd field goal		3	10–3
2	NE	09:48	FG	Stephen Gostkowski, 31 yd field goal		3	10–6
2	NYJ	09:44	TD	Leon Washington, 92 yd kick return	Jay Feely kick	7	17–6
2	NYJ	05:06	TD	Jerricho Cotchery, 15 yd pass from Brett Favre	Jay Feely kick	7	24–6
2	NE	00:20	TD	Jabar Gaffney, 19 yd pass from Matt Cassel	Stephen Gostkowski kick	7	24–13
3	NE	00:02	TD	Benjamin Watson, 10 yd pass from Matt Cassel	Jabar Gaffney pass from Matt Cassel	8	24–21
4	NE	10:22	FG	Stephen Gostkowski, 47 yd field goal		3	24–24
4	NYJ	03:14	TD	Thomas Jones, 1 yd run	Jay Feely, kick	3	31–24
4	NE	00:08	TD	Randy Moss, 16 yd pass from Matt Cassel	Stephen Gostkowski kick	7	31–31
OT	NYJ	07:15	FG	Jay Feely, 34 yd field goal		3	34–31

=== Week 12: at Tennessee Titans ===
Quarter	1	2	3	4	Total
Jets	7	3	10	14	34
Titans	0	3	0	10	13

at LP Field, Nashville, Tennessee

- Game time: 1:00 PM EST
- Game weather: 52 °F or 11.1 °C (Sunny)
- Game attendance: 69,143
- Referee: Carl Cheffers
- TV announcers (CBS): Jim Nantz and Phil Simms

Coming off their impressive Thursday night road win over the Patriots, the Jets flew to LP Field for a Week 12 duel with the undefeated Tennessee Titans. In the first quarter, New York took flight early as QB Brett Favre completed a 10-yard TD pass to RB Thomas Jones. In the second quarter, the Jets continued their scoring as kicker Jay Feely got a 20-yard field goal. The Titans closed out the half with kicker Rob Bironas getting a 43-yard field goal.

In the third quarter, New York went back to work as Feely made a 30-yard field goal, while Favre completed a 2-yard TD pass to WR Laveranues Coles. In the fourth quarter, Tennessee tried to rally as Bironas nailed a 49-yard field goal, yet the Jets replied with RB Leon Washington's 61-yard TD run. The Titans tried to keep their perfect season alive as QB Kerry Collins completed a 6-yard TD pass to FB Ahmard Hall. Afterwards, New York flew away as Washington got another 4-yard TD run.

With the win, the Jets improved to 8–3. Favre also broke a tie with Dan Marino for victories in the most NFL stadiums by winning in his 32nd at LP Field.

==== Scoring summary ====
Scoring summary
Q	Team	Time	Scoring play		Extra point	Score	
1	NYJ	09:01	TD	Thomas Jones, 10 yd pass from Brett Favre	Jay Feely kick	7	7–0
2	NYJ	04:04	FG	Jay Feely, 20 yd field goal		3	10–0
2	TEN	00:56	FG	Rob Bironas, 43 yd field goal		3	10–3
3	NYJ	08:11	FG	Jay Feely, 30 yd field goal		3	13–3
3	NYJ	03:08	TD	Laveranues Coles, 2 yd pass from Brett Favre	Jay Feely kick	7	20–3
4	TEN	12:55	FG	Rob Bironas, 49 yd field goal		3	20–6
4	NYJ	11:18	TD	Leon Washington, 61 yd run	Jay Feely kick	7	27–6
4	TEN	09:48	TD	Ahmard Hall, 6 yd pass from Kerry Collins	Rob Bironas kick	7	27–13
4	NYJ	02:14	TD	Leon Washington, 4 yd run	Jay Feely kick	7	34–13

=== Week 13: vs. Denver Broncos ===
Quarter	1	2	3	4	Total
Broncos	17	10	0	7	34
Jets	7	7	3	0	17

at The Meadowlands, East Rutherford, New Jersey

- Game time: 4:15 PM EST
- Game weather: 36 °F or 2.2 °C (Wintry Mix)
- Game attendance: 78,809
- Referee: Walt Coleman
- TV announcers (CBS): Kevin Harlan and Rich Gannon

Coming off their road win over the Titans, the Jets went home for a Week 13 duel with the Denver Broncos. The game would be moved from a 1:00 PM start time to a later time due to a more national interest in the Jets hence their 8–3 record. In the first quarter, New York trailed early as Broncos safety Vernon Fox returning a fumble 23 yards for a touchdown. The Jets would respond with RB Thomas Jones getting a 59-yard TD run, but Denver answered with QB Jay Cutler completing a 59-yard TD pass to WR Eddie Royal, along with kicker Matt Prater making a 25-yard field goal. In the second quarter, New York drew close as Jones got a 29-yard TD run, yet the Broncos replied with RB Peyton Hillis getting a 1-yard TD run, along with Prater getting a 35-yard field goal.

In the third quarter, the Jets tried to rally as kicker Jay Feely nailed a 30-yard field goal. However, in the fourth quarter, Denver pulled away as Cutler completed a 36-yard TD pass to WR Brandon Stokley.

With the loss, New York fell to 8–4.

==== Scoring summary ====
Scoring summary
Q	Team	Time	Scoring play		Extra point	Score	
1	DEN	09:31	TD	Vernon Fox, 23 yd fumble	Matt Prater kick	7	7–0
1	NYJ	08:32	TD	Thomas Jones, 59 yd run	Jay Feely kick	7	7–7
1	DEN	06:55	TD	Eddie Royal, 59 yd pass from Jay Cutler	Matt Prater kick	7	14–7
1	DEN	01:48	FG	Matt Prater, 25 yd field goal		3	17–7
2	NYJ	12:56	TD	Thomas Jones, 29 yd run	Jay Feely kick	7	17–14
2	DEN	04:38	TD	Peyton Hillis, 1 yd run	Matt Prater kick	7	24–14
2	DEN	00:08	FG	Matt Prater, 35 yd field goal		3	27–14
3	NYJ	02:55	FG	Jay Feely, 30 yd field goal		3	27–17
4	DEN	09:37	TD	Brandon Stokley, 36 yd pass from Jay Cutler	Matt Prater kick	7	34–17

=== Week 14: at San Francisco 49ers ===
Quarter	1	2	3	4	Total
Jets	0	7	7	0	14
49ers	7	7	0	10	24

at Candlestick Park, San Francisco, California

- Game time: 4:05 PM EST
- Game weather: 52 °F or 11.1 °C (Cloudy)
- Game attendance: 67,782
- Referee: Ed Hochuli
- TV announcers (CBS): Jim Nantz and Phil Simms

Hoping to rebound from their home loss to the Broncos, the Jets flew to Candlestick Park for a Week 14 interconference battle with the San Francisco 49ers. Late in the first quarter, New York trailed early as 49ers offensive tackle Joe Staley recovered Jason Hill's fumble in the endzone for a touchdown. The Jets responded in the second quarter with quarterback Brett Favre getting a 2-yard touchdown run, yet San Francisco would answer with quarterback Shaun Hill completing a 4-yard touchdown pass to running back Frank Gore.

In the third quarter, New York tied the game with running back Thomas Jones’ 17-yard touchdown run. However, the 49ers pulled away in the fourth quarter as kicker Joe Nedney nailed a 32-yard field goal, along with Hill completing a 3-yard touchdown pass to wide receiver Bryant Johnson.

With the loss, the Jets fell to 8–5.

==== Scoring summary ====
Scoring summary
Q	Team	Time	Scoring play		Extra point	Score	
1	SF	02:26	TD	Joe Staley, recovered fumble in endzone	Joe Nedney kick	7	7–0
2	NYJ	07:25	TD	Brett Favre, 2 yd run	Jay Feely kick	7	7–7
2	SF	00:50	TD	Frank Gore, 4 yd pass from Shaun Hill	Joe Nedney kick	7	14–7
3	NYJ	05:29	TD	Thomas Jones, 17 yd run	Jay Feely kick	7	14–14
4	SF	14:47	FG	Joe Nedney, 32 yd field goal		3	17–14
4	SF	06:12	TD	Bryant Johnson, 3 yd pass from Shaun Hill	Joe Nedney kick	7	24–14

=== Week 15: vs. Buffalo Bills ===
Quarter	1	2	3	4	Total
Bills	3	14	3	7	27
Jets	14	7	0	10	31

at The Meadowlands, East Rutherford, New Jersey

- Game time: 1:00 PM EST
- Game weather: 40 °F or 4.4 °C (Overcast)
- Game attendance: 78,548
- Referee: Jeff Triplette
- TV announcers (CBS): Greg Gumbel & Dan Dierdorf

Hoping to snap a two-game losing streak, the Jets went home for a Week 15 AFC East rematch with the Buffalo Bills. Early in the first quarter, New York soared off to an early lead as running back Thomas Jones got a 2-yard touchdown run. The Bills would answer with a 34-yard field goal from kicker Rian Lindell, yet the Jets answered with quarterback Brett Favre completing an 11-yard touchdown pass to wide receiver Jerricho Cotchery. Buffalo would take the lead in the second quarter as quarterback J. P. Losman got an 8-yard touchdown run and completed a 2-yard touchdown pass to wide receiver Stevie Johnson, but New York would get the halftime lead as running back Leon Washington got a 47-yard touchdown run.

In the third quarter, the Bills got within one as Lindell got a 48-yard field goal. In the fourth quarter, the Jets added onto their lead as kicker Jay Feely nailed a 31-yard field goal. Buffalo got the lead again as running back Fred Jackson dragged defenders for an 11-yard touchdown run. After a Jets punt, Buffalo took over with just over two minutes remaining. Rather than try to run out the clock and burn the Jets' timeouts, Losman dropped back for a pass on third down. Under pressure from safety Abram Elam, Losman let go of the ball, allowing defensive end Shaun Ellis to return that fumble 11 yards for the game-winning touchdown.

With the win, the Jets improved to 9–5, needing wins in their last two games to clinch the AFC East.

==== Scoring summary ====
Scoring summary
Q	Team	Time	Scoring play		Extra point	Score	
1	NYJ	11:55	TD	Thomas Jones, 2 yd run	Jay Feely kick	7	7–0
1	BUF	07:48	FG	Rian Lindell, 34 yd field goal		3	7–3
1	NYJ	03:50	TD	Jerricho Cotchery, 11 yd pass from Brett Favre	Jay Feely kick	7	14–3
2	BUF	06:52	TD	J. P. Losman, 8 yd run	Rian Lindell kick	7	14–10
2	BUF	02:10	TD	Stevie Johnson, 2 yd pass from J. P. Losman	Rian Lindell kick	7	14–17
2	NYJ	01:05	TD	Leon Washington, 47 yd run	Jay Feely kick	7	21–17
3	BUF	03:42	FG	Rian Lindell, 48 yd field goal		3	21–20
4	NYJ	13:21	FG	Jay Feely, 31 yd field goal		3	24–20
4	BUF	05:39	FG	Fred Jackson, 11 yd run	Rian Lindell kick	7	24–27
4	NYJ	02:06	TD	Shaun Ellis, 11 yd fumble	Jay Feely kick	7	31–27

=== Week 16: at Seattle Seahawks ===
Quarter	1	2	3	4	Total
Jets	3	0	0	0	3
Seahawks	0	7	3	3	13

at Qwest Field, Seattle, Washington

- Game time: 4:05 PM EST
- Game weather: 31 °F or −0.6 °C (Snow)
- Game attendance: 68,161
- Referee: Tony Corrente
- TV announcers (CBS): Gus Johnson and Steve Tasker

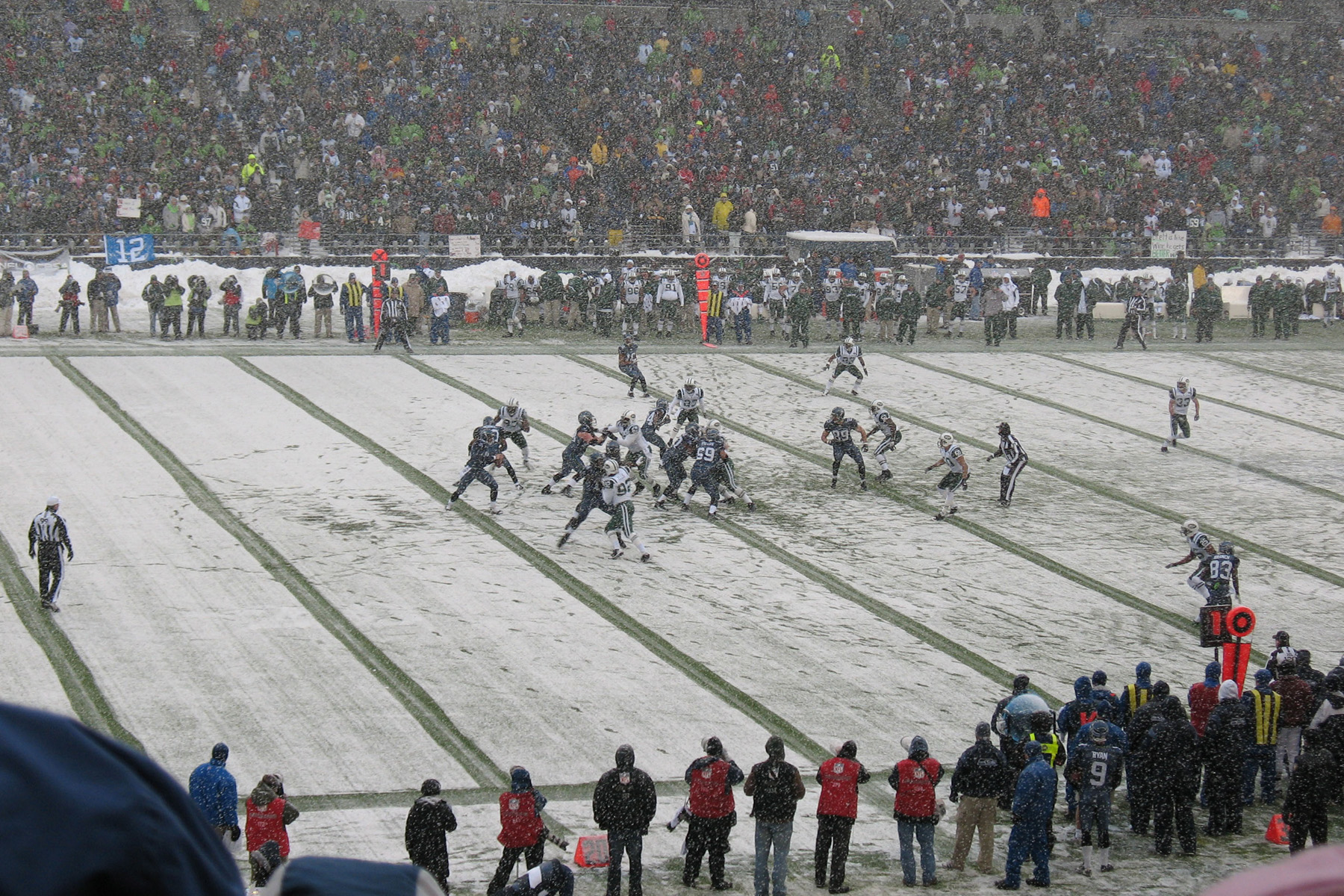
The Jets and Seahawks at a snow-covered Qwest Field, week 16

==== Game summary ====
For the fourth time in as many trips to the western United States, the Jets lost to the Seahawks in Mike Holmgren's final home game as that team's head coach. The loss dropped the Jets to 9–6 and out of first place in the AFC East. Jay Feely put the Jets on the board with a field goal eight minutes into the game and the lead held for most of the remainder of the first half. Seattle scored with thirty one seconds remaining in the half on a Seneca Wallace touchdown pass. Olindo Mare kicked two field goals in the second half, including one with 1:47 remaining to clinch victory for Seattle. Brett Favre was held without a touchdown pass for the Jets and threw two interceptions, and Thomas Jones was held to 67 yards. For the Seahawks Maurice Morris rushed for 116 yards on 29 carries and Wallace finished with 175 yards passing and his second-quarter touchdown.

With the loss, New York fell to 9–6.

==== Scoring summary ====
Scoring summary
Q	Team	Time	Scoring play		Extra point	Score	
1	NYJ	08:11	FG	Jay Feely, 20 yd field goal		3	3–0
2	SEA	00:36	TD	John Carlson, 2 yd pass from Seneca Wallace	Olindo Mare kick	7	3–7
3	SEA	02:46	FG	Olindo Mare, 31 yd field goal		3	3–10
4	SEA	01:52	FG	Olindo Mare, 38 yd field goal		3	3–13

=== Week 17: vs. Miami Dolphins ===
Quarter	1	2	3	4	Total
Dolphins	0	14	7	3	24
Jets	0	9	8	0	17

at The Meadowlands, East Rutherford, New Jersey

- Game time: 4:15 PM EST
- Game weather: 65 °F or 18.3 °C (Cloudy)
- Game attendance: 79,454
- Referee: Bill Leavy
- TV announcers (CBS): Jim Nantz and Phil Simms

Although the Jets would achieve a winning season, it would not be enough because the Patriots and Dolphins would both finish the season at 11–5. Therefore, the team with the better record against the division and conference would make the playoffs. Being that the Miami Dolphins were the most improved team from last year being 1–15 in 2007 to 11–5 in 2008, the game would be moved to a later start time to allow a more national audience to view the game. The Jets went home for a Week 17 AFC East rematch with the Miami Dolphins. After a scoreless first quarter, New York took flight in the second quarter as quarterback Brett Favre completed a 13-yard touchdown pass to wide receiver Laveranues Coles (with a failed PAT). The Dolphins would strike back with former Jets quarterback Chad Pennington completing a 27-yard touchdown pass to wide receiver Ted Ginn Jr., along with rookie defensive end Phillip Merling returning an interception 25 yards for a touchdown. New York would close out the half as kicker Jay Feely got a 28-yard field goal.

In the third quarter, the Jets regained the lead as running back Leon Washington got a 10-yard touchdown run (followed by Favre's 2-point conversion pass to wide receiver Jerricho Cotchery). However, Miami replied with Pennington's 20-yard touchdown pass to tight end Anthony Fasano. In the fourth quarter, the Dolphins would pull away as kicker Dan Carpenter nailed a 48-yard field goal. New York tried to get a comeback, but Miami's defense stopped any attempt.

With the loss, the Jets' season ended at 9–7. As a result, head coach Eric Mangini would eventually be fired.

==== Scoring summary ====
Scoring summary
Q	Team	Time	Scoring play		Extra point	Score	
1	No scoring plays						
2	NYJ	06:55	TD	Laveranues Coles, 13 yd pass from Brett Favre		6	6–0
2	MIA	02:25	TD	Ted Ginn Jr., 27 yd pass from Chad Pennington	Dan Carpenter kick	7	6–7
2	MIA	02:12	TD	Phillip Merling, 25 yd interception return	Dan Carpenter kick	7	6–14
2	NYJ	00:04	FG	Jay Feely, 28 yd field goal		3	9–14
3	NYJ	10:35	TD	Leon Washington, 10 yd run	Jerricho Cotchery pass from Brett Favre	8	17–14
3	MIA	07:16	TD	Anthony Fasano, 20 yd pass from Chad Pennington	Dan Carpenter kick	7	17–21
4	MIA	09:25	FG	Dan Carpenter, 48 yd field goal		3	17–24
