= 2004 New York Jets season =

2004 season of NFL team New York Jets

- Owner: Woody & Christopher Johnson
- Head coach: Herman Edwards
- Home stadium: Giants Stadium

Results
- Record: 10–6
- Division place: 2nd AFC East
- Playoffs: Won Wild Card Playoffs (at Chargers) 20–17 (OT); Lost Divisional Playoffs (at Steelers) 17–20 (OT)
- Pro Bowlers: C Kevin Mawae; RB Curtis Martin; DE John Abraham

Uniform
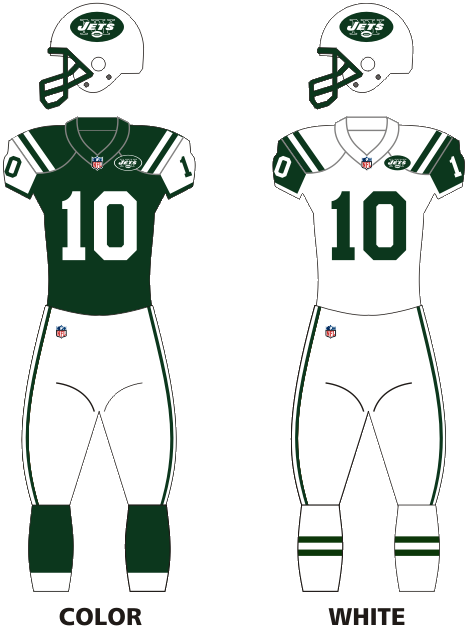

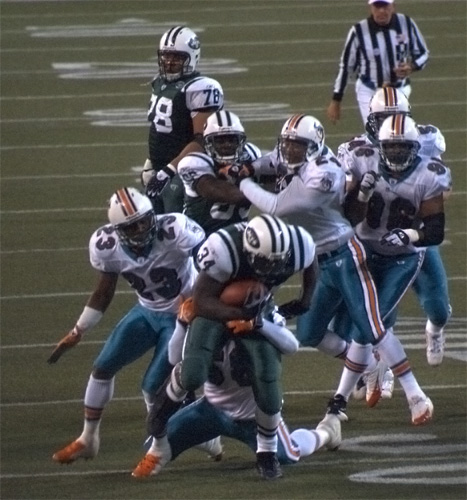
A rushing play by LaMont Jordan for New York against the Miami Dolphins in 2004, week 8

The 2004 New York Jets season was the franchise's 35th season in the National Football League (NFL), the 45th season overall, and the fourth under head coach Herman Edwards.

The season began with the Jets attempting to improve on their 6–10 record from 2003. The Jets started the season by winning their first five games, which constituted a franchise record. They ultimately finished 10–6, and clinched the fifth seed in the playoffs, reaching the postseason for the third time in four seasons.

They upset the AFC West champion San Diego Chargers in the Wild Card round, winning in overtime 20–17, but would lose in the Divisional round to the Pittsburgh Steelers, also by a score 20–17 in overtime.

== Offseason ==
The Jets signed former Arizona Cardinals cornerback David Barrett and offensive guard Pete Kendall, as well as Seattle Seahawks safety Reggie Tongue and Oakland Raiders linebacker Eric Barton. The Jets also traded for Tennessee Titans wide receiver Justin McCareins.

=== NFL draft ===
The Jets were granted the 12th pick in the first round of the NFL draft by virtue of their 6–10 record in 2003. They used this pick to take linebacker Jonathan Vilma from the University of Miami. They were also granted the maximum four compensatory draft picks as a result of losing premium free agents before the 2003 season.

2004 New York Jets draft
Round	Pick	Player	Position	College	Notes
1	12	Jonathan Vilma *	MLB	Miami (FL)	
3	76	Derrick Strait	CB	Oklahoma	
4	108	Jerricho Cotchery	WR	NC State	
4	132	Adrian Jones	OT	Kansas	Compensatory pick
5	143	Erik Coleman	S	Washington State	
6	178	Marko Cavka	OT	Sacramento State	
7	213	Darrell McClover	LB	Miami (FL)	
7	234	Trevor Johnson	DE	Nebraska	Compensatory pick
7	235	Derrick Ward	RB	Ottawa (KS)	Compensatory pick
7	236	Rashad Washington	SS	Kansas State	Compensatory pick
Made roster * Made at least one Pro Bowl during career

== Staff ==
2004 New York Jets staff
Front office: Owner – Woody Johnson; Manager of football administration – Dawn Aponte; Head coaches: Head coach – Herman Edwards; Assistant head coach/special teams coordinator – Mike Westhoff; Offensive coaches: Offensive coordinator – Paul Hackett; Quarterbacks – Jim Hostler; Running backs – Bishop Harris; Tight ends – John Zernhelt; Offensive line – Doug Marrone; Assistant offensive line – Dave Szott; Offensive assistant/quarterbacks – Pep Hamilton; Offensive assistant – Tim Berbenich	Defensive coaches: Defensive coordinator – Donnie Henderson; Defensive line coach – Denny Marcin; Linebackers – Bob Sutton; Defensive backs – Corwin Brown; Strength and conditioning: Strength and conditioning – John Lott; Strength assistant – Sal Alosi

== Roster ==
2004 New York Jets roster
Quarterbacks (QB): 5 Brooks Bollinger; 17 Quincy Carter; 10 Chad Pennington; 14 Ricky Ray; Running backs (RB): 35 B. J. Askew FB; 34 LaMont Jordan; 28 Curtis Martin; 33 Jerald Sowell FB; Wide receivers (WR): 84 Jonathan Carter; 80 Wayne Chrebet; 89 Jerricho Cotchery; 81 Justin McCareins; 83 Santana Moss; Tight ends (TE): 86 Chris Baker; 88 Anthony Becht	Offensive linemen (OL): 77 Marko Cavka OT; 69 Jason Fabini OT; 78 Jonathan Goodwin C; 79 Adrian Jones OT; 66 Pete Kendall G; 68 Kevin Mawae C; 67 Kareem McKenzie OT; 65 Brandon Moore G; 64 Dave Yovanovits G; Defensive linemen (DL): 94 John Abraham DE; 92 Shaun Ellis DE; 72 Jason Ferguson DT; 98 Alan Harper DT; 97 Trevor Johnson DE; 93 James Reed DT; 63 Dewayne Robertson DT; 99 Bryan Thomas DE	Linebackers (LB): 50 Eric Barton OLB; 55 Mark Brown OLB; 56 Sam Cowart MLB; 58 Jason Glenn OLB; 54 Victor Hobson OLB; 57 Darrell McClover OLB; 51 Jonathan Vilma MLB; 52 Kenyatta Wright MLB; Defensive backs (DB): 29 Donnie Abraham CB; 36 David Barrett CB; 39 Roderick Bryant CB; 27 Terrell Buckley CB; 45 Oliver Celestin FS; 26 Erik Coleman FS; 38 Jon McGraw FS; 21 Derrick Strait CB; 25 Reggie Tongue SS; 42 Rashad Washington SS; Special teams (ST): 6 Doug Brien K; 85 James Dearth LS; 4 Toby Gowin P	Practice squad: 30 Keith Burnell RB; 22 Andrew Davison CB; 96 Joey Evans DE; 18 Chas Gessner WR; 31 Carl Kearney S; 95 Tim McGill DT; 61 Jason Nerys G; 2 Terrence Stubbs WR; Reserve: 37 Josh Davis RB (IR); 91 Josh Evans DT (IR); 23 Jamie Henderson CB (NF-Inj.); 24 Ray Mickens CB (IR); 20 Derek Pagel S (IR); Rookies in italics 53 active, 5 reserve, 8 practice squad

== Preseason ==
Week	Date	Opponent	Result	Record	Venue	Recap
1	August 13	at New Orleans Saints	L 13–23	0–1	Louisiana Superdome	Recap
2	August 21	at Indianapolis Colts	W 31–7	1–1	RCA Dome	Recap
3	August 27	New York Giants	W 17–10	2–1	Giants Stadium	Recap
4	September 3	Philadelphia Eagles	W 28–27	3–1	Giants Stadium	Recap

== Regular season ==
During the 2004 regular season the Jets’ non-divisional, conference opponents were primarily from the AFC North, although they also played the Houston Texans from the AFC South, and the San Diego Chargers from the AFC West. Their non-conference opponents were from the NFC West.

=== Schedule ===
Week	Date	Opponent	Result	Record	Venue	Recap
1	September 12	Cincinnati Bengals	**W** 31–24	1–0	Giants Stadium	Recap
2	September 19	at San Diego Chargers	**W** 34–28	2–0	Qualcomm Stadium	Recap
3	Bye					
4	October 3	at **Miami Dolphins**	**W** 17–9	3–0	Pro Player Stadium	Recap
5	October 10	**Buffalo Bills**	**W** 16–14	4–0	Giants Stadium	Recap
6	October 17	San Francisco 49ers	**W** 22–14	5–0	Giants Stadium	Recap
7	October 24	at **New England Patriots**	**L** 7–13	5–1	Gillette Stadium	Recap
8	November 1	**Miami Dolphins**	**W** 41–14	6–1	Giants Stadium	Recap
9	November 7	at **Buffalo Bills**	**L** 17–22	6–2	Ralph Wilson Stadium	Recap
10	November 14	Baltimore Ravens	**L** 17–20 (OT)	6–3	Giants Stadium	Recap
11	November 21	at Cleveland Browns	**W** 10–7	7–3	Cleveland Browns Stadium	Recap
12	November 28	at Arizona Cardinals	**W** 13–3	8–3	Sun Devil Stadium	Recap
13	December 5	Houston Texans	**W** 29–7	9–3	Giants Stadium	Recap
14	December 12	at Pittsburgh Steelers	**L** 6–17	9–4	Heinz Field	Recap
15	December 19	Seattle Seahawks	**W** 37–14	10–4	Giants Stadium	Recap
16	December 26	**New England Patriots**	**L** 7–23	10–5	Giants Stadium	Recap
17	January 2	at St. Louis Rams	**L** 29–32 (OT)	10–6	Edward Jones Dome	Recap
Note: Intra-division opponents are in **bold** text.

=== Game summaries ===
==== Week 1: vs. Cincinnati Bengals ====
Quarter	1	2	3	4	Total
Bengals	7	3	7	7	**24**
**Jets**	14	0	10	7	**31**

at The Meadowlands, East Rutherford, New Jersey

- Game time: 1:00 PM EDT
- Game weather: 76 °F or 24.4 °C (Sunny)
- Game attendance: 77,230
- TV announcers (CBS): Ian Eagle and Solomon Wilcots

The major story heading into this game was the professional debut of Bengal quarterback Carson Palmer. However, the Jets’ offense, led by running back Curtis Martin, spearheaded the Jets’ victory. After an early fumble led to a Bengals touchdown, the Jets took the lead late in the first quarter and never trailed. Martin ran for 196 yards and a touchdown, as well as a touchdown reception, and was an opening day record for Jets running backs. Quarterback Chad Pennington, making his first opening day start in his career, threw for 224 yards and two touchdowns and was an efficient 20-for-27 passing.

==== Week 2: at San Diego Chargers ====
Quarter	1	2	3	4	Total
**Jets**	14	3	10	7	**34**
Chargers	0	7	7	14	**28**

at Qualcomm Stadium, San Diego, California

- Game time: 4:15 PM EDT/1:15 PM PDT
- Game weather: 73 °F or 22.8 °C (Clear)
- Game attendance: 57,310
- TV announcers (CBS): Ian Eagle, Solomon Wilcots, and Scott Kaplan

The Jets got out to a 20-point lead before holding off a second-half comeback by San Diego. Two Curtis Martin touchdowns helped stake New York to a 17–0 lead, which grew to 27–7 after a field goal and a touchdown pass from Chad Pennington to Jerald Sowell. The Chargers finally responded late in the third quarter with a four-yard touchdown run from LaDainian Tomlinson, followed by a 33-yard touchdown pass from quarterback Drew Brees to Reche Caldwell. A one-yard touchdown pass from Pennington to Chris Baker in the fourth quarter put the game out of reach for San Diego.

Martin’s 119 yards made him the Jets’ all-time rushing leader, passing Freeman McNeil's mark of 8,074 yards.

==== Week 4: at Miami Dolphins ====
Quarter	1	2	3	4	Total
**Jets**	7	3	7	0	**17**
Dolphins	0	9	0	0	**9**

at Pro Player Stadium, Miami Gardens, Florida

- Game time: 4:15 PM EDT
- Game weather: 88 °F or 31.1 °C (Partly cloudy)
- Game attendance: 73,157
- TV announcers (CBS): Kevin Harlan and Randy Cross

The Dolphins were looking for their first win, while the Jets were looking to stay undefeated. Midway through the first quarter, Santana Moss returned a punt 24 yards to set up a 1-yard touchdown run by Curtis Martin. The Dolphins responded with 2 field goals. Leading 10–6 late in the 2nd quarter, Jets quarterback Chad Pennington was picked off by Arturo Freeman to set up a third Olindo Mare field goal and a 10–9 deficit. On Miami’s opening drive of the second half, quarterback Jay Fiedler was intercepted by Donnie Abraham who returned it 66 yards for a touchdown, putting the Jets ahead 17–9. That was all the cushion the Jets would need as the defense went on to force 3 more turnovers and hold on to beat the Dolphins, keeping them undefeated at 3–0.

==== Week 5: vs. Buffalo Bills ====
Quarter	1	2	3	4	Total
Bills	0	0	0	14	**14**
**Jets**	0	10	3	3	**16**

at The Meadowlands, East Rutherford, New Jersey

- Game time: 4:05 PM EDT
- Game weather: 64 °F (17.8 °C)
- Game attendance: 77,976
- TV announcers (CBS): Kevin Harlan, Randy Cross, and Marcus Allen

The Jets looked to go 4–0, while the Bills looked for their first win of the year. The Jets started off strong with a 61-yard drive to the Bills 11, however Doug Brien’s 29-yard field goal attempt on 4th down was wide left. Both teams traded punts before the Jets went on a 79-yard drive which took 4:12 off the clock and ended on a Chris Baker 1-yard touchdown reception from Pennington. Both teams traded punts once again before the Jets advanced to the Bills 19 and Doug Brien nailed a 37-yard field goal seconds before halftime. With 6:56 left in the 3rd Pennington hit Wayne Chrebet on a 27-yard catch which set up a 36-yard field goal by Brien. After a Bills punt Pennington led the Jets down the field before he was intercepted by Jeff Posey. The Bills then advanced 53 yards before Drew Bledsoe hit Mark Campbell on a 16-yard touchdown. After a Jets punt, Bledsoe led the Bills on a 63-yard drive capped off on a 46-yard Lee Evans touchdown giving them the 14–13 lead with 6:58 left in the game. However, the Jets wouldn’t go down and went on a 60-yard drive which ended on a game winning Doug Brien 38-yard field goal with 59 seconds left in the game. The Bills were able to get to their own 48-yard line before Bledsoe threw a game sealing interception to Terrell Buckley with 2 seconds remaining in the game.

==== Week 6: vs. San Francisco 49ers ====
Quarter	1	2	3	4	Total
49ers	7	7	0	0	**14**
**Jets**	0	3	6	13	**22**

at The Meadowlands, East Rutherford, New Jersey

- Game time: 1:00 PM EDT
- Game weather: 53 °F or 11.7 °C (Cloudy)
- Game attendance: 78,189
- TV announcers (Fox): Sam Rosen and Bill Maas

After the 1–4 Niners jumped to a 14–0 lead, the Jets clawed back as Lamont Jordan and Curtis Martin touchdowns (marred by two failed 2-point attempts) iced a 22–14 Jets lead and a 5–0 record.

==== Week 7: at New England Patriots ====
Quarter	1	2	3	4	Total
Jets	0	7	0	0	**7**
**Patriots**	3	10	0	0	**13**

at Gillette Stadium, Foxborough, Massachusetts

- Game time: 4:05 PM EDT
- Game weather: 46 °F or 7.8 °C (Cloudy, windy, occasional drizzle)
- Game attendance: 68,756
- TV announcers (CBS): Jim Nantz, Phil Simms, Bonnie Bernstein

The Jets’ win streak ended in a 13–7 finalé and the Patriots’ league-record win streak reached 21 as David Patten’s touchdown catch from Tom Brady wrapped up the second quarter. From there neither team could score: the second half saw seven punts, a Dan Klecko fumble, and a failed fourth down attempt by the Jets.

==== Week 8: vs. Miami Dolphins ====
Quarter	1	2	3	4	Total
Dolphins	0	7	0	7	**14**
**Jets**	7	10	14	10	**41**

at The Meadowlands, East Rutherford, New Jersey

- Game time: 9:00 PM EST
- Game weather: 52 °F or 11.1 °C (Partly cloudy)
- Game attendance: 78,216
- TV announcers (ABC): Al Michaels and John Madden

The Jets hosted the Dolphins on Monday Night Football and rebounded from their first loss of the year to pummel Miami 41–14. Chad Pennington had three touchdown throws while Curtis Martin and Lamont Jordan added rushing scores; the Jets also intercepted Jay Fiedler twice.

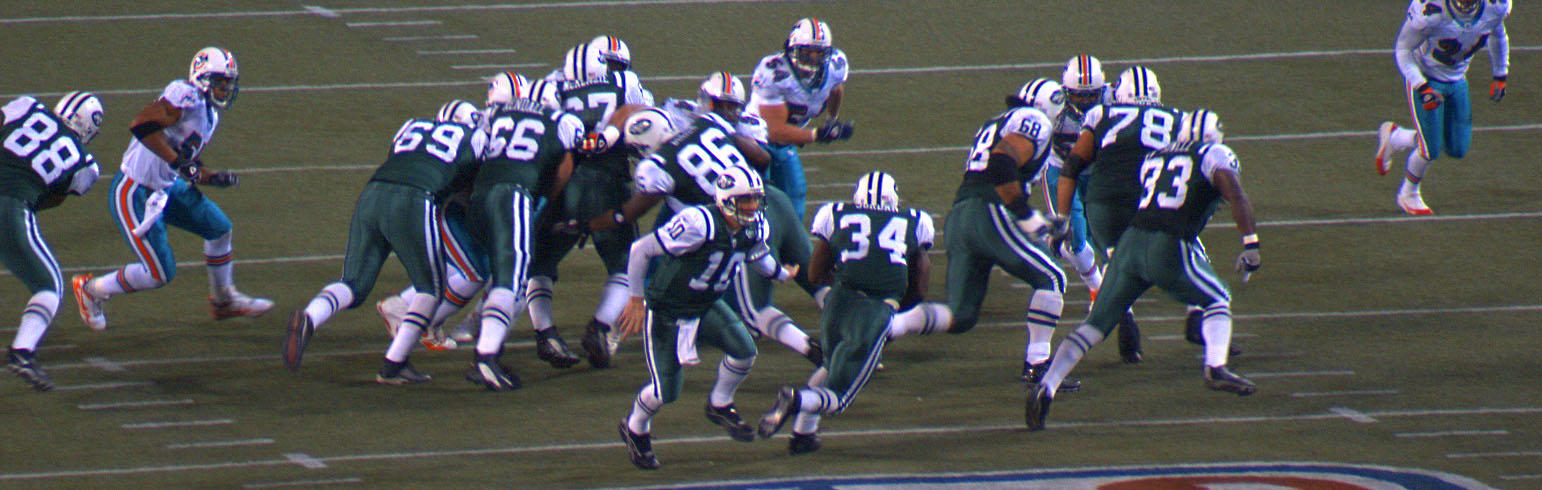
LaMont Jordan receives a handoff in week 8 against Miami

==== Week 9: at Buffalo Bills ====
Quarter	1	2	3	4	Total
Jets	0	10	0	7	**17**
**Bills**	7	3	7	5	**22**

at Ralph Wilson Stadium, Orchard Park, New York

- Game time: 1:00 PM EST
- Game weather: 55 °F or 12.8 °C (Mostly cloudy, windy)
- Game attendance: 72,574
- TV announcers (CBS): Dick Enberg, Dan Dierdorf, Armen Keteyian

Willis McGahee led the Bills offense with 132 rushing yards and a touchdown as the Bills upended the Jets 22–17. Drew Bledsoe had 184 passing yards and a score (to Lee Evans) while Chad Pennington had one touchdown and one pick; he had to come out and former Cowboy Quincy Carter completed two passes, one of them a 51-yard score to Santana Moss.

==== Week 10: vs. Baltimore Ravens ====
Quarter	1	2	3	4	OT	Total
**Ravens**	0	7	3	7	3	**20**
Jets	0	14	0	3	0	**17**

at The Meadowlands, East Rutherford, New Jersey

- Game time: 1:00 PM EST
- Game weather: 48 °F or 8.9 °C (Clear)
- Game attendance: 77,826
- TV announcers (CBS): Jim Nantz, Phil Simms, Bonnie Bernstein

With Carter starting for injured Pennington, the Jets rushed to a 14–0 early lead on two Curtis Martin touchdowns, but Kyle Boller led the Ravens to a 17–14 lead on two touchdowns to Clarence Moore. The Jets tied it and in overtime Matt Stover won it for the Ravens (20–17 final) from 42 yards out.

==== Week 11: at Cleveland Browns ====
Quarter	1	2	3	4	Total
**Jets**	0	0	3	7	**10**
Browns	0	7	0	0	**7**

at Cleveland Browns Stadium, Cleveland, Ohio

- Game time: 1:00 PM EST
- Game weather: 51 °F or 10.6 °C (Cloudy)
- Game attendance: 72,547
- TV announcers (CBS): Jim Nantz, Phil Simms, Bonnie Bernstein

On a fourth quarter touchdown to Justin McCareins, Quincy Carter got his first win since his last season in Dallas as the Jets edged the Browns 10–7. Jeff Garcia managed a three-yard score to Aaron Shea but managed only 88 passing yards.

==== Week 12: at Arizona Cardinals ====
Quarter	1	2	3	4	Total
**Jets**	0	3	10	0	**13**
Cardinals	0	3	0	0	**3**

at Sun Devil Stadium, Tempe, Arizona

- Game time: 4:15 PM EST/2:15 PM MST
- Game weather: 63 °F or 17.2 °C (Partly cloudy, windy)
- Game attendance: 35,820
- TV announcers (CBS): Ian Eagle, Solomon Wilcots

Former Dallas Cowboys Quincy Carter of the Jets and Emmitt Smith of the Cardinals squared off in a 13–3 Jets win. Carter had a 69-yard touchdown to Santana Moss while Smith was held to just 21 yards amid four Cardinals turnovers (two of them interceptions by Josh McCown).

==== Week 13: vs. Houston Texans ====
Quarter	1	2	3	4	Total
Texans	0	7	0	0	**7**
**Jets**	3	3	7	16	**29**

at The Meadowlands, East Rutherford, New Jersey

- Game time: 1:00 PM EST
- Game weather: 56 °F (13.3 °C)
- Game attendance: 77,875
- TV announcers (CBS): Dick Enberg, Dan Dierdorf, Armen Keteyian

Chad Pennington returned and threw for 155 yards and two touchdowns as the Jets crushed the Texans 29–7, picking off David Carr twice.

==== Week 14: at Pittsburgh Steelers ====
Quarter	1	2	3	4	Total
Jets	0	0	3	3	**6**
**Steelers**	3	0	0	14	**17**

at Heinz Field, Pittsburgh, Pennsylvania

- Game time: 4:05 PM EST
- Game weather: 34 °F or 1.1 °C (Cloudy)
- Game attendance: 63,581
- TV announcers (CBS): Jim Nantz, Phil Simms, Bonnie Bernstein

The Steelers’ win streak under rookie Ben Roethlisberger continued as “Big Ben” threw for just 144 yards (and was intercepted twice), but the Jets performed worse; the Steelers intercepted Chad Pennington three times and the Jets committed twelve penalties (to two for Pittsburgh) as the Steelers won 17–6. Jerome Bettis ran in one touchdown and threw once for ten yards.

==== Week 15: vs. Seattle Seahawks ====
Quarter	1	2	3	4	Total
Seahawks	7	7	0	0	**14**
**Jets**	3	21	6	7	**37**

at The Meadowlands, East Rutherford, New Jersey

- Game time: 1:00 PM EST
- Game weather: 45 °F or 7.2 °C (Hazy)
- Game attendance: 77,894
- TV announcers (Fox): Joe Buck, Troy Aikman, Cris Collinsworth, Pam Oliver

The Jets exploded to five touchdowns, three by Chad Pennington with a missed PAT and two rushing scores by Curtis Martin to rout the Seahawks 37–14; they gained 482 yards of offense to 275 yards for the Seahawks.

==== Week 16: vs. New England Patriots ====
Quarter	1	2	3	4	Total
**Patriots**	0	13	3	7	**23**
Jets	0	0	0	7	**7**

at The Meadowlands, East Rutherford, New Jersey

- Game time: 4:05 PM EST
- Game weather: 30 °F or −1.1 °C (Overcast)
- Game attendance: 77,975
- TV announcers (CBS): Jim Nantz, Phil Simms, Bonnie Bernstein

New York area media had been critical of the Jets for their inability to beat quality opponents; Kevin Mawae and Pennington were sharp in responses to media criticism (said Mawae following the Jets’ win over Houston, referencing New York’s earlier defeat of the Chargers, “San Diego is 9–3. We’re 9–3. Is San Diego not a good team?”), but they fell flat against the Patriots, themselves smarting from an ugly loss in Miami the week earlier. Tom Brady had two touchdowns and Pennington was picked off twice as the Patriots won 23-7; the loss prevented the Jets from clinching a playoff spot.

==== Week 17: at St. Louis Rams ====
Quarter	1	2	3	4	OT	Total
Jets	3	7	16	3	0	**29**
**Rams**	0	14	7	8	3	**32**

at Edward Jones Dome, St. Louis, Missouri

- Game time: 1:00 PM EST/12:00 PM CST
- Game weather: Indoors (Domed stadium)
- Game attendance: 65,877
- TV announcers (CBS): Dick Enberg, Dan Dierdorf, Armen Keteyian

The Jets clinched a playoff spot despite failing 32–29 in overtime; they erased a 21–10 Rams lead as Chad Pennington and three Jets backs led by Curtis Martin’s 153 yards almost evenly split 361 yards in the air and on the ground. Marc Bulger managed by himself to outgain the entire Jet offense with 450 passing yards and three touchdowns despite two picks.

== Postseason ==
=== Schedule ===
Round	Date	Opponent (seed)	Result	Record	Venue	Recap
Wild Card	January 8, 2005	at San Diego Chargers (4)	W 20–17 (OT)	1–0	Qualcomm Stadium	Recap
Divisional	January 15, 2005	at Pittsburgh Steelers (1)	L 17–20 (OT)	1–1	Heinz Field	Recap

=== Game summaries ===
==== AFC Wild Card Playoffs: at (4) San Diego Chargers ====
Quarter	1	2	3	4	OT	Total
Jets	0	7	10	0	3	20
Chargers	0	7	0	10	0	17

at Qualcomm Stadium, San Diego, California

- Game time: 8:00 PM EST
- Game weather: 55 °F or 12.8 °C (Slight drizzle)
- Game attendance: 67,536
- Referee: Ed Hochuli
- TV announcers (ABC): Al Michaels and John Madden

The Jets came into the game having lost 2 straight while San Diego was on a roll. The Jets started out the game well driving down the field on their opening drive only to see kicker Doug Brien miss a 33-yard field goal wide right. In the second quarter, Chargers quarterback Drew Brees found receiver Keenan McCardell for a 26-yard touchdown pass to give San Diego a 7–0. The Jets responded as Jets quarterback Chad Pennington found Anthony Becht for a 13-yard touchdown pass to tie the game. New York kept the momentum into the 3rd quarter as Santana Moss pulled in a perfect 46-yard touchdown pass from Pennington to give the Jets a 14–7 lead. The teams traded field goals. Then San Diego got the ball back with under 5:00 to play. The Chargers drove down to the Jets 3-yard line but faced a 4th and goal at the 3. Brees’ desperation pass was knocked down for an apparent Jets victory. However, a roughing the passer penalty on linebacker Eric Barton gave the Chargers a second chance, which they quickly seized as Brees found Antonio Gates for a 1-yard touchdown pass to send the game into overtime. 10 minutes into the extra period the Chargers were in position to win the game off the foot of rookie kicker Nate Kaeding. However, his 40-yard field goal sailed wide right as the Jets took advantage of their second chance driving down to the San Diego 8. Doug Brien connected on a 28-yard field goal to give the Jets the win and in the process advancing them to the next round to face the Steelers. Pennington’s numbers were very impressive as he was 23 of 33 for 279 and 2 TDs. Brees was 31 of 42 for 319 yards, 2 TDs and 1 interception.

==== AFC Divisional Round: at (1) Pittsburgh Steelers ====
Quarter	1	2	3	4	OT	Total
Jets	0	10	7	0	0	17
Steelers	10	0	0	7	3	20

at Heinz Field, Pittsburgh, Pennsylvania

- Game time: 4:30 PM EST
- Game weather: 28 °F or −2.2 °C (Clear)
- Game attendance: 64,825
- Referee: Bill Leavy
- TV announcers (CBS): Dick Enberg, Dan Dierdorf, Armen Keteyian

The Pittsburgh Steelers were looking to make it 15 straight victories as they hosted the New York Jets in the AFC Divisional Round. Pittsburgh started out well as Jeff Reed hit a 45-yard field goal, then Jerome Bettis plowed into the endzone from 3 yards out to give Pittsburgh a 10–0 lead. But New York stormed back. Following a field goal by kicker Doug Brien, Santana Moss took a punt return 75 yards for a touchdown to tie the game. Then, late in the third quarter, Reggie Tongue intercepted Ben Roethlisberger and returned it 86 yards for a touchdown to give the Jets a 17–10 lead. Pittsburgh responded midway through the fourth quarter as Hines Ward scored on a shovel pass to tie the game. Chad Pennington and the Jets offense were shut down for most of the game. However, they drove down the field on the ensuing drive only to see it come to a disappointing halt as Doug Brien’s 47 field goal attempt hit the crossbar and falling just short. But on the very next play, Roethlisberger was picked off by David Barrett. Doug Brien was given a chance to win the game on the last play of regulation but missed the 43-yard kick wide left sending the game into overtime. In overtime, Roethlisberger drove the Steelers 73 yards on 13 plays. Jeff Reed then connected on a 33-yard field goal, handing the Jets a defeat.

== Standings ==
AFC East
	W	L	T	PCT	DIV	CONF	PF	PA	STK
^{(2)} New England Patriots	14	2	0	.875	5–1	10–2	437	260	W2
^{(5)} New York Jets	10	6	0	.625	3–3	7–5	333	261	L2
Buffalo Bills	9	7	0	.563	3–3	5–7	395	284	L1
Miami Dolphins	4	12	0	.250	1–5	2–10	275	354	L1

AFC
#	Team	Division	W	L	T	PCT	DIV	CONF	SOS	SOV	STK
Division leaders
1	Pittsburgh Steelers	North	15	1	0	.938	5–1	11–1	.484	.479	W14
2	New England Patriots	East	14	2	0	.875	5–1	10–2	.492	.478	W2
3 (Note: Indianapolis clinched the AFC #3 seed instead of San Diego based upon head-to-head victory.)	Indianapolis Colts	South	12	4	0	.750	5–1	8–4	.500	.458	L1
4	San Diego Chargers	West	12	4	0	.750	5–1	9–3	.477	.411	W1
Wild cards
5 (Note: New York Jets clinched the AFC #5 seed instead of Denver based upon better record against common opponents (New York Jets were 5–0 to Denver’s 3–2 against San Diego, Cincinnati, Houston, and Miami).)	New York Jets	East	10	6	0	.625	3–3	7–5	.523	.406	L2
6	Denver Broncos	West	10	6	0	.625	3–3	7–5	.484	.450	W2
Did not qualify for the postseason
7 (Note: Jacksonville and Baltimore finished ahead of Buffalo because they each defeated Buffalo head-to-head.) (Note: Jacksonville finished ahead of Baltimore based upon better record against common opponents (Jacksonville were 3–2 against Baltimore’s 2–3 versus Pittsburgh, Indianapolis, Buffalo and Kansas City).)	Jacksonville Jaguars	South	9	7	0	.563	2–4	6–6	.527	.479	W1
8	Baltimore Ravens	North	9	7	0	.563	3–3	6–6	.551	.472	W1
9	Buffalo Bills	East	9	7	0	.563	3–3	5–7	.512	.382	L1
10	Cincinnati Bengals	North	8	8	0	.500	2–4	4–8	.543	.453	W2
11 (Note: Houston finished ahead of Kansas City based upon head-to-head victory.)	Houston Texans	South	7	9	0	.438	4–2	6–6	.504	.402	L1
12	Kansas City Chiefs	West	7	9	0	.438	3–3	6–6	.551	.509	L1
13 (Note: Oakland finished ahead of Tennessee based upon head-to-head victory.)	Oakland Raiders	West	5	11	0	.313	1–5	3–9	.570	.450	L2
14	Tennessee Titans	South	5	11	0	.313	1–5	3–9	.512	.463	W1
15 (Note: Miami finished ahead of Cleveland based upon head-to-head victory.)	Miami Dolphins	East	4	12	0	.250	1–5	2–10	.555	.438	L1
16	Cleveland Browns	North	4	12	0	.250	1–5	3–9	.590	.469	W1
Tiebreakers (Note: When breaking ties for three or more teams under the NFL's rules, they are first broken within divisions, then comparing only the highest-ranked remaining team from each division.)
