= Thomas Bryant (disambiguation) =

Thomas Bryant (born 1997) is an American professional basketball player

Thomas Bryant may also refer to:

- Slim Bryant (1908–2010), American country music singer-songwriter
- Thomas Bryant (cricketer) (1933–2012), South African cricketer
- Thomas B. Bryant III, member of the South Carolina House of Representatives
- Tom Bryant (harpist) (1882–1946), Welsh harpist
- Tom Bryant (politician), D.C.'s shadow U.S. representative January 3, 1999 – January 3, 2001
- Tommy Bryant (1930–1982), American jazz double-bassist

== See also ==
- Thomas Bryan (disambiguation)
