= David Barrett (American football) =

American football player (born 1977)

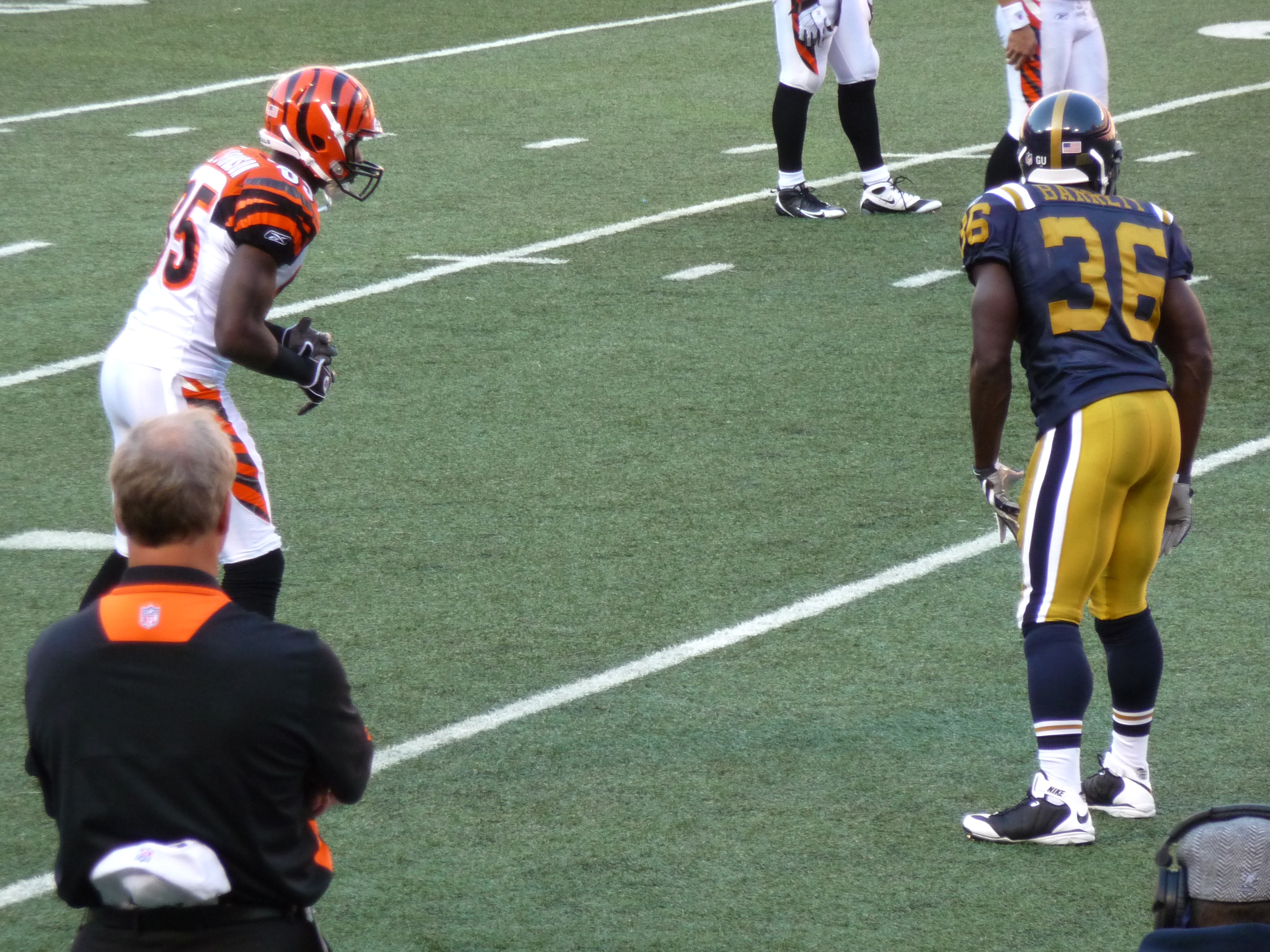
- Barrett and Chad Ochocinco in 2008

No. 36
- Position: Cornerback

Personal information
- Born: December 22, 1977 (age 48); Waterloo, Iowa, U.S.
- Listed height: 5 ft 10 in (1.78 m)
- Listed weight: 195 lb (88 kg)

Career information
- College: Arkansas
- NFL draft: 2000: 4th round, 102nd overall pick

Career history
- Arizona Cardinals (2000–2003); New York Jets (2004–2008)

Awards and highlights
- Second-team All-SEC (1999)

Career NFL statistics
- Total tackles: 479
- Forced fumbles: 10
- Fumble recoveries: 3
- Pass deflections: 71
- Interceptions: 18
- Defensive touchdowns: 1
- Stats at Pro Football Reference

David Barrett (born December 22, 1977) is an American former professional football player who was a cornerback for nine seasons in the National Football League (NFL). He played college football for the Arkansas Razorbacks and was selected by the Arizona Cardinals in the fourth round of the 2000 NFL draft. Barrett also played for the New York Jets.

== Early life ==
Barrett graduated from Osceola High School, where he excelled in football.

== College career ==
Barrett played college football at the University of Arkansas. During his college career, he had a total of 176 tackles, 7 interceptions, 3 forced fumbles and 5 sacks for the Razorbacks. He majored in architecture.

== Professional career ==
Pre-draft measurables
| Height | Weight | Arm length | Hand span | 40-yard dash | 10-yard split | 20-yard split | 20-yard shuttle | Three-cone drill | Vertical jump | Broad jump | Bench press |
|---|---|---|---|---|---|---|---|---|---|---|---|
| 5 ft 9 7/8 in (1.77 m) | 199 lb (90 kg) | 31 1/8 in (0.79 m) | 10 in (0.25 m) | 4.46 s | 1.55 s | 2.60 s | 4.04 s | 6.81 s | 37.5 in (0.95 m) | 9 ft 8 in (2.95 m) | 16 reps |
All values from NFL Combine

=== Arizona Cardinals ===
Barrett was selected by the Arizona Cardinals in the fourth round (102nd overall) in the 2000 NFL draft. He played for them until 2003.

=== New York Jets ===
In 2004, David Barrett signed with the New York Jets and became the team's starting cornerback. In 2005, he had five interceptions. However, by 2007 he had lost his starting job to Hank Poteat.

On February 10, 2009, Barrett was released by the Jets.

== NFL career statistics ==
Legend
| **Bold** | Career high |

=== Regular season ===
| Year | Team | Games | | Tackles | | | | | Interceptions | | | | | Fumbles | | | |
| Year | Team | GP | GS | Cmb | Solo | Ast | Sck | TFL | Int | Yds | TD | Lng | PD | FF | FR | Yds | TD |
|---|---|---|---|---|---|---|---|---|---|---|---|---|---|---|---|---|---|
| 2000 | ARI | 16 | 0 | 19 | 15 | 4 | 0.0 | 0 | 0 | 0 | 0 | 0 | 1 | 1 | **1** | 0 | 0 |
| 2001 | ARI | 16 | 9 | 62 | 53 | 9 | 0.0 | 1 | 2 | 30 | 0 | 23 | 8 | **2** | 0 | 0 | 0 |
| 2002 | ARI | 14 | 14 | 74 | 57 | **17** | 0.0 | 2 | 3 | **40** | 0 | 22 | 11 | 1 | **1** | 21 | 0 |
| 2003 | ARI | 16 | 16 | **80** | **69** | 11 | 0.0 | 1 | 1 | 25 | 0 | **25** | 9 | 1 | 0 | 0 | 0 |
| 2004 | NYJ | 16 | 16 | 78 | 64 | 14 | 0.0 | **6** | 2 | 14 | 0 | 14 | **13** | 1 | 0 | 0 | 0 |
| 2005 | NYJ | 13 | 8 | 49 | 41 | 8 | 0.0 | 3 | **5** | 28 | 0 | 13 | 12 | **2** | **1** | **30** | 0 |
| 2006 | NYJ | 13 | 3 | 36 | 23 | 13 | 0.0 | 0 | 3 | 0 | 0 | 0 | 6 | **2** | 0 | 0 | 0 |
| 2007 | NYJ | 16 | 9 | 63 | 54 | 9 | 0.0 | 1 | 1 | 0 | 0 | 0 | 7 | 0 | 0 | 0 | 0 |
| 2008 | NYJ | 11 | 1 | 18 | 15 | 3 | **0.5** | 1 | 1 | 25 | **1** | **25** | 4 | 0 | 0 | 0 | 0 |
| | | 131 | 76 | 479 | 391 | 88 | 0.5 | 15 | 18 | 162 | 1 | 25 | 71 | 10 | 3 | 51 | 0 |

=== Postseason ===
| Year | Team | Games | | Tackles | | | | | Interceptions | | | | | Fumbles | | | |
| Year | Team | GP | GS | Cmb | Solo | Ast | Sck | TFL | Int | Yds | TD | Lng | PD | FF | FR | Yds | TD |
|---|---|---|---|---|---|---|---|---|---|---|---|---|---|---|---|---|---|
| 2004 | NYJ | 2 | 2 | **9** | **8** | **1** | 0.0 | 0 | **1** | **24** | 0 | **24** | 0 | 0 | 0 | 0 | 0 |
| 2006 | NYJ | 1 | 1 | 5 | 4 | **1** | 0.0 | 0 | 0 | 0 | 0 | 0 | **2** | 0 | 0 | 0 | 0 |
| | | 3 | 3 | 14 | 12 | 2 | 0.0 | 0 | 1 | 24 | 0 | 24 | 2 | 0 | 0 | 0 | 0 |

== Personal life ==
In 1979, his mother, Willie Ann Rucker, disappeared and has never been found. Barrett appeared in ABC’s Extreme Makeover: Home Edition in 2006, with teammate Adrian Jones, to help build a new home for the Llanes family. His wife Sheila works as a curator for the Jefferson Davis museum in Waterloo.
