= Bryan Thomas =

Bryan Thomas may refer to:

- Bryan Thomas (American football) (born 1979), American football player
- Bryan Thomas Jr. (born 2004), American football defensive end
- Bryan Thomas (architect) (1928–2024), British architect
- Bryan Thomas (canoeist) (born 1961), Australian canoeist
- Bryan M. Thomas (1836–1905), American general

== See also ==
- Brian Thomas (disambiguation)
- Thomas Bryan (disambiguation)
