= Thomas Bryan =

Thomas Bryan may refer to:

- Thomas Bryan (VC) (1882–1945), English recipient of the Victoria Cross
- Thomas Bryan (Chief Justice) (died 1500), British justice
- Thomas Bryan (courtier) (died 1518), English courtier during the reign of Henry VIII
- Thomas Bryan (Irish republican) (1897–1921), member of the Irish Republican Army
- Luke Bryan (Thomas Luther Bryan, born 1976), American country singer
- Thomas Bryan Martin (1731–1798), early American jurist, legislator, and prominent landowner
- Thomas Bryan (English footballer) (1873–?), English footballer
- Thomas Bryan (Welsh footballer) (1866–?), Welsh international footballer
- Thomas Barbour Bryan (1828–1906), American businessman, lawyer, and politician

== See also ==
- Thomas Bryant (disambiguation)
- Bryan Thomas (disambiguation)
