= Brian Thomas =

Brian Thomas may refer to:

- Brian Thomas (church artist) (1912–1989), British mural artist
- Brian Thomas (politician) (born 1939), American politician in Washington state
- Brian Thomas (rugby union) (1940–2012), Wales international rugby union player
- Brian Thomas Jr. (born 2002), American football player

== See also ==
- Bryan Thomas (disambiguation)
