= Bryan Thomas (American football) =

American football player (born 1979)

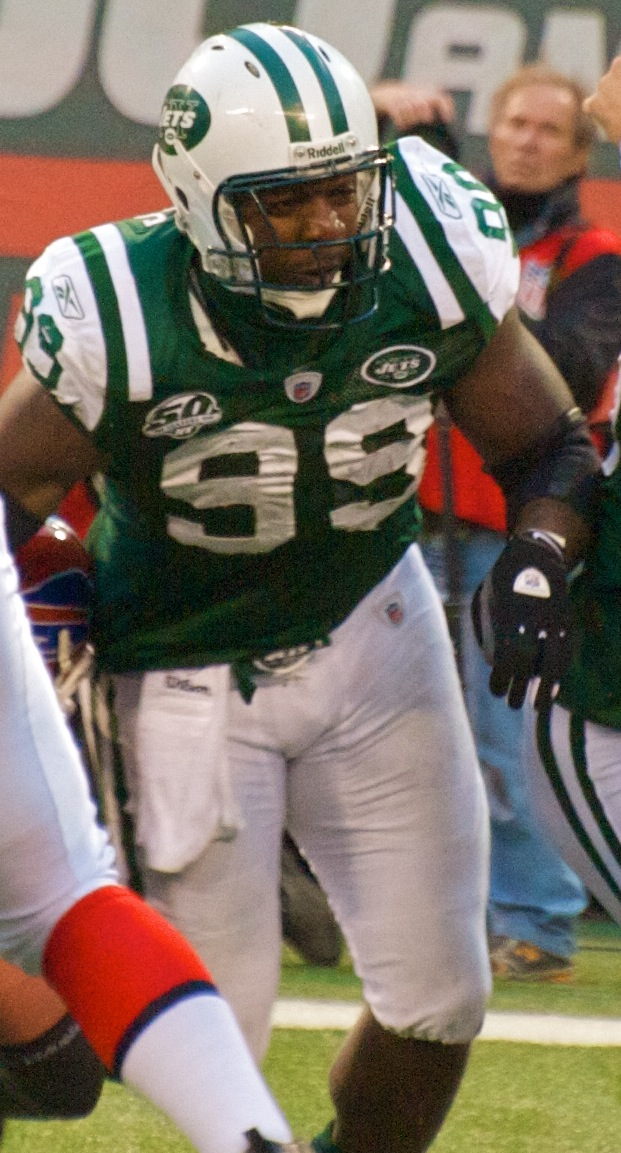
- Thomas in 2009.

No. 99, 58
- Position: Outside linebacker/Defensive end

Personal information
- Born: June 7, 1979 (age 47); Birmingham, Alabama, U.S.
- Listed height: 6 ft 4 in (1.93 m)
- Listed weight: 265 lb (120 kg)

Career information
- High school: Minor (Adamsville, Alabama)
- College: UAB
- NFL draft: 2002: 1st round, 22nd overall pick

Career history
- New York Jets (2002–2012)

Career NFL statistics
- Total tackles: 455
- Sacks: 33.5
- Forced fumbles: 6
- Fumble recoveries: 6
- Stats at Pro Football Reference

Bryan Thomas Sr (born June 7, 1979) is an American former professional football player who was a linebacker and defensive end in the National Football League (NFL). He was selected by the New York Jets 22nd overall in the 2002 NFL draft and spent his entire 11-year career with the team. He played college football at the University of Alabama at Birmingham.

== Early life ==
Thomas was born in Birmingham, Alabama. He attended the University of Alabama at Birmingham, where he played college football for the UAB Blazers.

== Professional career ==
The 6'4" Thomas had an impressive combine performance that elevated him from a mid-second round pick to the first round.

Pre-draft measurables
Height	Weight	40-yard dash	20-yard shuttle	Vertical jump	Bench press
6 ft 4 1/2 in (1.94 m)	266 lb (121 kg)	4.47 s	4.01 s	35 in (0.89 m)	33 reps
All values from NFL Combine

Thomas played 15 games in his rookie year of 2002 collecting a half-sack and 5 total tackles.

Thomas played all 16 games (10 started) in 2003 with a sack, 3 passes defended, one fumble recovery, and 26 total tackles.

Thomas played in 14 games (6 started) of the 2004 season with 1.5 sacks, a pass defended, and 28 total tackles.

Playing 16 games (4 starts) of the 2005 season, Thomas has 3.5 sacks, 2 passes defended, and 25 total tackles

Thomas played his entire career as a defensive end until being converted to a linebacker in the 3-4 defense for the Jets during the 2006 NFL season. Thomas became a defensive end when Mangini used a 4-3 defense. Thomas led the New York Jets in sacks with 8.5 sacks. This was his breakout season playing as an outside linebacker with new head coach Eric Mangini. At the end of the 2006 season, Thomas was awarded a new contract.

In 2007, Thomas reverted to the disappointing play that had previously been the hallmark of his career. This raised concerns that Thomas was a "one year wonder" or a "contract year" player. In particular, comments made by Thomas during the 2007 season where he said he had not thought it necessary to "continue to work to improve" left many Jets fans extremely concerned. Overall, Thomas finished the 2007 season with 2.5 sacks, one pass defended, a forced fumble, and 39 total tackles.

Thomas had a mediocre 2008 season as he collected 5.5 sacks, one pass defended, 2 forced fumbles (1 recovery), and 38 total tackles.

Thomas collected 2 sacks, one pass defended, 2 fumble recoveries, and 41 total tackles. He led the Jets into the playoffs until the team lost in the AFC Championship to the Indianapolis Colts.

In 2010, Thomas changed his jersey number to 58. He collected 6 sacks, one pass defended, a fumble recovery, and 31 total tackles. He led the Jets to the playoffs for the second season in a row but lost the AFC Championship to the Pittsburgh Steelers.

Thomas did not play long during the 2011 season as he suffered a torn Achilles tendon on October 2, 2011, which knocked him out for the rest of the season. Overall, he recorded 10 total tackles and one pass defended in 4 games played.

Thomas was released by the Jets on September 22, 2012, after suffering a hamstring injury. Two days later, the Jets re-signed him. Thomas finished the 2012 season with 2.5 sacks, one pass defended, and 18 total tackles. Thomas was released after the season was over.

=== NFL statistics ===
Year	Team	GP	COMB	TOTAL	AST	SACK	FF	FR	FR YDS	INT	IR YDS	AVG IR	LNG	TD	PD
2002	NYJ	15	9	5	4	0.5	0	0	0	0	0	0	0	0	0
2003	NYJ	16	42	26	16	1.0	0	1	0	0	0	0	0	0	2
2004	NYJ	14	43	28	15	1.5	0	0	0	0	0	0	0	0	1
2005	NYJ	16	37	24	13	3.5	0	0	0	0	0	0	0	0	2
2006	NYJ	16	77	58	19	8.5	1	1	0	0	0	0	0	0	0
2007	NYJ	16	47	39	8	2.5	1	0	0	0	0	0	0	0	1
2008	NYJ	16	57	39	18	5.5	3	1	0	0	0	0	0	0	1
2009	NYJ	16	53	40	13	2.0	1	2	7	0	0	0	0	0	1
2010	NYJ	16	39	31	8	6.0	1	1	16	0	0	0	0	0	1
2011	NYJ	4	14	10	4	0.0	0	0	0	0	0	0	0	0	1
2012	NYJ	12	24	18	6	2.5	0	0	0	0	0	0	0	0	1
Career		157	442	318	124	33.5	7	6	0	0	0	0	0	0	11

== Personal ==
His son, Bryan Thomas Jr., plays for the Jacksonville Jaguars. Also, he was an assistant coach on his son's high school football team.
