= Thomas B. Bryant III =

American lawyer and politician (born 1937)

Member of the South Carolina House of Representatives
- In office 1969–???

Personal details
- Born: September 23, 1937 (age 88) Orangeburg, South Carolina, U.S.
- Education: Washington and Lee University
- Occupation: Lawyer

Thomas B. Bryant III (born September 23, 1937) is an American lawyer and politician. He served as a member of the South Carolina House of Representatives.

== Life and career ==
Bryant was born in Orangeburg, South Carolina, He attended Washington and Lee University.

In 1969, Bryant was elected to the South Carolina House of Representatives, representing Orangeburg County, South Carolina.
