= Erik Coleman =

American football player (born 1982)

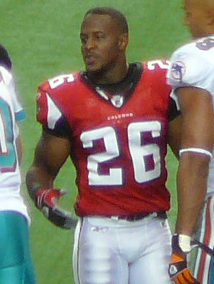
- Coleman with the Atlanta Falcons in 2009

No. 26, 24
- Position: Safety

Personal information
- Born: May 6, 1982 (age 44); Sacramento, California, U.S.
- Listed height: 5 ft 10 in (1.78 m)
- Listed weight: 207 lb (94 kg)

Career information
- College: Washington State
- NFL draft: 2004: 5th round, 143rd overall pick

Career history
- New York Jets (2004–2007); Atlanta Falcons (2008–2010); Detroit Lions (2011–2012)

Awards and highlights
- First-team All-Pac-10 (2003)

Career NFL statistics
- Total tackles: 652
- Sacks: 2
- Forced fumbles: 4
- Fumble recoveries: 1
- Interceptions: 11
- Stats at Pro Football Reference

Erik James Coleman (born May 6, 1982) is an American former professional football player who was a safety in the National Football League (NFL). He was selected by the New York Jets in the fifth round of the 2004 NFL draft and also played for the Atlanta Falcons and Detroit Lions. He played college football for the Washington State Cougars.

== College career ==
Coleman played college football at Washington State University. He majored in communications.

== Professional career ==
=== New York Jets ===
Coleman was selected by the New York Jets in the fifth round (143rd overall) of the 2004 NFL draft. He unexpectedly became one of the most important Jet defenders, cementing his starting role with interceptions in each of his first two NFL games. He finished the season as the NFL's highest grossing member of its performance-pay program, the league's plan for rewarding low-salary players who outperform their contracts. In week six of the 2005 season against the Buffalo Bills he made a career high 14 tackles. Before the 2006 season Coleman underwent an appendectomy, slowing his production that season. During his tenure with the New York Jets he started in 45 of 48 regular season games.

=== Atlanta Falcons ===
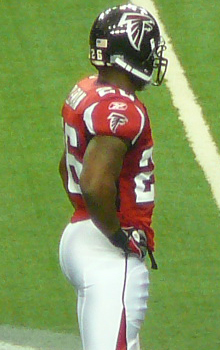
Coleman with the Falcons in 2009

On March 1, 2008, Coleman was signed by the Atlanta Falcons. In the 2008 season, Erik Coleman had 95 total tackles, 6 passes deflected, and three interceptions. Those three interceptions were the most on the Atlanta Falcons team.

On February 9, 2011, Coleman was released from the Falcons.

=== Detroit Lions ===
On February 18, 2011, Coleman signed a one-year contract with the Detroit Lions. He was released on December 4, 2012.

== NFL career statistics ==
Legend
**Bold**	Career high

=== Regular season ===
Year	Team	Games		Tackles					Interceptions					Fumbles			
Year	Team	GP	GS	Cmb	Solo	Ast	Sck	TFL	Int	Yds	TD	Lng	PD	FF	FR	Yds	TD
2004	NYJ	16	16	100	73	27	**2.0**	**4**	**4**	43	0	**37**	**12**	0	**1**	0	0
2005	NYJ	16	16	**121**	**84**	**37**	0.0	1	2	4	0	4	7	0	0	0	0
2006	NYJ	16	13	101	70	31	0.0	3	1	3	0	3	4	0	0	0	0
2007	NYJ	15	4	50	28	22	0.0	0	0	0	0	0	0	0	0	0	0
2008	ATL	16	16	95	80	15	0.0	1	3	**48**	0	32	6	**2**	0	0	0
2009	ATL	16	16	116	82	34	0.0	3	0	0	0	0	5	**2**	0	0	0
2010	ATL	12	1	20	15	5	0.0	3	0	0	0	0	0	0	0	0	0
2011	DET	4	0	2	2	0	0.0	0	0	0	0	0	0	0	0	0	0
2012	DET	12	7	47	32	15	0.0	0	1	0	0	0	3	0	0	0	0
		123	89	652	466	186	2.0	15	11	98	0	37	37	4	1	0	0

=== Postseason ===
Year	Team	Games		Tackles					Interceptions					Fumbles			
Year	Team	GP	GS	Cmb	Solo	Ast	Sck	TFL	Int	Yds	TD	Lng	PD	FF	FR	Yds	TD
2004	NYJ	2	2	**17**	**15**	2	0.0	0	0	0	0	0	**2**	0	**1**	**1**	0
2006	NYJ	1	1	10	4	**6**	0.0	0	0	0	0	0	0	0	0	0	0
2008	ATL	1	1	8	6	2	0.0	0	0	0	0	0	0	0	0	0	0
2010	ATL	1	0	1	1	0	0.0	**1**	0	0	0	0	0	0	0	0	0
		5	4	36	26	10	0.0	1	0	0	0	0	2	0	1	1	0

== Post-NFL career ==
=== SNY ===
Following his retirement in 2013 from the NFL, Coleman joined the SNY team. Coleman uses his own on-field experience as an on-air sports analyst, reporting post-game recaps for SNY's "Jets Post Game Live!", "Jets Extra Point", "Jets Nation" and SNY's Jets Draft show. Frequently also appearing as a sports commentator on numerous sports shows and network programs such as Hannity on Fox, Closing Bell with Liz Claman on Fox Business, ABC, PIX 11, CBS, ESPN Radio and WFAN, to name a few.

=== Radio ===
In addition to his on-camera career, Coleman has hit the airwaves as a radio host. Coleman began his radio resume as an on-air analyst with Stony Brook University's football radio broadcast team in 2015. Most recently, Coleman has joined Sirius XM as a host on Channel 88's for NFL rewind discussing the plays of the week and engaging with fans.

=== Philanthropy ===
As a humanitarian, Coleman is a mentor for My Brother's Keeper Mentorship Program, and supports a number of causes including, pediatric cancer, traumatic brain injury, and sickle cell anemia. Adding to his list of long charity causes, Coleman is the celebrity ambassador for The THRIVE Network, an organization that helps those with disabilities in need.
