= Dewayne Robertson =

American football player (born 1981)

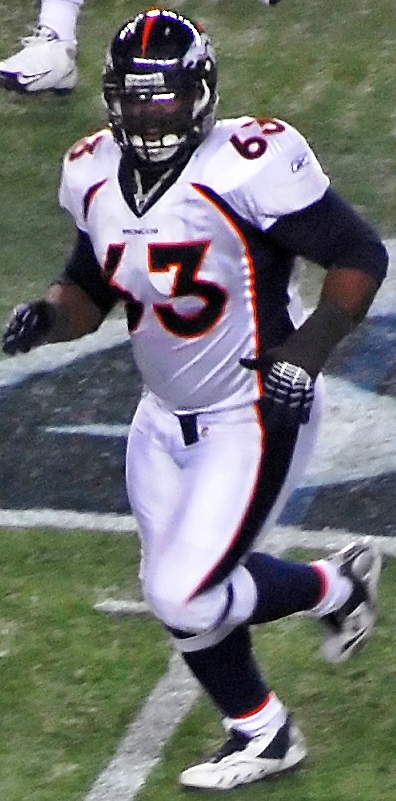
- Robertson with the Denver Broncos in 2008

No. 63
- Position: Defensive tackle

Personal information
- Born: October 16, 1981 (age 45); Memphis, Tennessee, U.S.
- Listed height: 6 ft 1 in (1.85 m)
- Listed weight: 308 lb (140 kg)

Career information
- High school: Memphis (TN) Melrose
- College: Kentucky
- NFL draft: 2003: 1st round, 4th overall pick

Career history
- New York Jets (2003–2007); Denver Broncos (2008)

Awards and highlights
- PFWA All-Rookie Team (2003); Second-team All-SEC (2002); Freshman All-SEC (2000)

Career NFL statistics
- Total tackles: 283
- Sacks: 16
- Forced fumbles: 3
- Fumble recoveries: 2
- Stats at Pro Football Reference

Dewayne Jamar Robertson (born October 16, 1981) is an American former professional football player who was a defensive tackle in the National Football League (NFL). He was selected by the New York Jets fourth overall in the 2003 NFL draft and has also played for the Denver Broncos. He played college football for the Kentucky Wildcats.

== Early life ==
Robertson attended Melrose High School in Memphis, Tennessee and was a letterman in football. In football, he was a two-time All-Metropolitan Memphis honoree and a two-time All-State honoree.

== College career ==
Robertson attended college at the University of Kentucky. He originally intended to play H-Back, but was later converted back to defensive tackle after several key drops in spring practice. As a freshman, he was named Freshman All-SEC by the league's coaches.

In his junior season in 2002, Robertson recorded 48 tackles, five sacks for -40 yards, 13 quarterback pressures, a pass defensed, and a blocked kick, earning a second-team All-SEC selection.

Robertson decided to forgo his senior season and enter the 2003 NFL draft. He finished his collegiate career with 114 tackles, one fumble recovery, three forced fumbles and 10.5 sacks in three seasons.

== Professional career ==
Pre-draft measurables
Height	Weight	Arm length	Hand span
6 ft 1 3/8 in (1.86 m)	317 lb (144 kg)	31 3/4 in (0.81 m)	9 1/2 in (0.24 m)
All values from NFL Combine

=== New York Jets ===
Robertson was chosen by the New York Jets after his junior year in the first round with the fourth overall pick of the 2003 NFL draft. He was the highest selected defensive player from Kentucky since Art Still went second overall in the 1978 NFL draft.

He started all 16 games during his rookie season (2003), recording 43 tackles and 1.5 sacks. He was the first Jets defensive player to start every game in his rookie season since Mo Lewis in 1991.

He played in all 16 games in 2004, totaling 52 tackles and 3 sacks. He had 7 tackles in the Jets’ 20–17 overtime Wild Card playoff victory on the road against the San Diego Chargers.

Robertson played in 13 games, tallying 43 tackles, 3.5 sacks, and 1 pass breakup. For the first time in his career, he missed a game in Week 15, due to an injured thigh.

On November 14, 2006, Robertson was named the AFC Defensive Player of the Week for Week 10. He had six tackles and a sack in the Jets' Week 10 win over the New England Patriots.

Robertson's career with the Jets was labeled as a bust, considering the high expectations and the Jets efforts to trade up to draft him.

On March 3, 2008, ESPN.com reported that Robertson has been traded to the Bengals. However, later that same day, FOXSports.com broke the news that Robertson and the Bengals were unable to come to terms on a new contract, resulting in the trade falling through.

=== Denver Broncos ===
On April 24, 2008, the Jets reached an agreement to trade Robertson to the Denver Broncos for a late-round conditional pick in the 2009 NFL draft. This pick could have escalated as high as a second rounder based on the statistics and performance of Robertson. Upon acquiring Robertson, the Broncos signed him to a five-year contract believed to be worth about $24 million.

Robertson was released by the Broncos on February 16, 2009, after just one season with the team.

== NFL career statistics ==
Legend
**Bold**	Career high

=== Regular season ===
Year	Team	Games		Tackles					Interceptions					Fumbles			
Year	Team	GP	GS	Cmb	Solo	Ast	Sck	TFL	Int	Yds	TD	Lng	PD	FF	FR	Yds	TD
2003	NYJ	**16**	**16**	46	37	9	1.5	**6**	0	0	0	0	0	0	0	0	0
2004	NYJ	**16**	**16**	53	**39**	14	3.0	**6**	0	0	0	0	0	**1**	0	0	0
2005	NYJ	13	12	43	28	15	3.5	3	0	0	0	0	**1**	**1**	0	0	0
2006	NYJ	**16**	**16**	**62**	37	**25**	2.5	4	0	0	0	0	0	**1**	**1**	0	0
2007	NYJ	**16**	15	57	36	21	**4.0**	5	0	0	0	0	0	0	**1**	0	0
2008	DEN	15	15	22	18	4	1.5	0	0	0	0	0	0	0	0	0	0
		92	90	283	195	88	16.0	24	0	0	0	0	1	3	2	0	0

=== Playoffs ===
Year	Team	Games		Tackles					Interceptions					Fumbles			
Year	Team	GP	GS	Cmb	Solo	Ast	Sck	TFL	Int	Yds	TD	Lng	PD	FF	FR	Yds	TD
2004	NYJ	**2**	**2**	7	**6**	1	0.0	**2**	0	0	0	0	0	0	0	0	0
2006	NYJ	1	1	**8**	4	**4**	0.0	0	0	0	0	0	0	**1**	0	0	0
		3	3	15	10	5	0.0	2	0	0	0	0	0	1	0	0	0
