= Adrian Jones (offensive guard) =

American football player (born 1981)

No. 79, 73
- Position: Offensive guard

Personal information
- Born: June 10, 1981 (age 45); Dallas, Texas, U.S.
- Listed height: 6 ft 4 in (1.93 m)
- Listed weight: 330 lb (150 kg)

Career information
- High school: Dallas Carter
- College: Kansas
- NFL draft: 2004: 4th round, 132nd overall pick

Career history
- New York Jets (2004–2007); Kansas City Chiefs (2007–2008); Houston Texans (2009)*; Pittsburgh Steelers (2010)*; Omaha Nighthawks (2010)
- * Offseason or practice squad member only

Career NFL statistics
- Games played: 44
- Games started: 16
- Stats at Pro Football Reference

Adrian Denard Jones (born June 10, 1981) is an American former professional football player who was an offensive guard in the National Football League (NFL). He played college football for the Kansas Jayhawks and was selected by the New York Jets in the fourth round of the 2004 NFL draft.

Jones has also played for the Kansas City Chiefs.

== Professional career ==
On July 21, 2010, Jones signed with the Pittsburgh Steelers. Jones was released August 31, 2010.
