= Eric Barton =

American football player (born 1977)

No. 50
- Position: Linebacker

Personal information
- Born: September 29, 1977 (age 49); Alexandria, Virginia, U.S.
- Listed height: 6 ft 2 in (1.88 m)
- Listed weight: 245 lb (111 kg)

Career information
- College: Maryland
- NFL draft: 1999: 5th round, 146th overall pick

Career history
- Oakland Raiders (1999–2003); New York Jets (2004–2008); Cleveland Browns (2009–2010)

Awards and highlights
- First-team All-ACC (1998)

Career NFL statistics
- Total tackles: 868
- Sacks: 20
- Forced fumbles: 8
- Fumble recoveries: 7
- Interceptions: 4
- Stats at Pro Football Reference

Eric Barton (born September 29, 1977) is an American former professional football player who was a linebacker for 12 seasons in the National Football League (NFL). He played college football for the Maryland Terrapins before he was selected by the Oakland Raiders in the fifth round of the 1999 NFL draft. He played for the Raiders from 1999 to 2003, the New York Jets from 2004 to 2008, and the Cleveland Browns from 2009 to 2010.

== Early life ==
Barton went to Thomas A. Edison High School (Fairfax County, Virginia) in Alexandria, Virginia. He earned All-American honors from the National Recruiting Advisor and an All-Atlantic Coast recognition from Blue Chip Illustrated Magazine and was rated 10th-best football player in Virginia by Super Prep Magazine as a senior.

== College career ==
Barton attended the University of Maryland where he majored in criminology and criminal justice. He recorded more than 100 tackles as a sophomore, junior and senior at Maryland, which helped land him fourth on the career tackles list. He also led the ACC in solo tackles as junior and senior. He was an All-ACC first-team selection as senior and led conference in total tackles (159) and average tackles per game (14.5).

== Professional career ==
=== Oakland Raiders ===
Barton was selected by the Oakland Raiders in the fifth round (146th overall) of the 1999 NFL draft.

He saw action in all of his 16 games in the 1999 NFL season, making three starts and finishing with 29 tackles and two sacks. He recorded a sack in the first play of his first NFL start and finished with, a team-high, eight tackles in Week 15 vs. Tampa Bay Buccaneers. He started and tallied 13 tackles at LB in Super Bowl XXXVII in a loss to the Buccaneers. He led the team for the ninth time on the season with a nine-tackle performance vs. the Kansas City Chiefs in the season finale.

=== New York Jets ===
Barton signed with the New York Jets as an unrestricted free agent in 2004. He registered nine or more tackles seven times in the 2004 NFL season, including an AFC Wild Card victory over the San Diego Chargers. He earned AFC Defensive Player of the Week honors as a result of nine tackles, one sack, one INT, two PD, one FF and one FR in a Week 15 win vs. the Seattle Seahawks. Barton led the defense with a career-high 16 tackles, including 12 solo and one for loss, in a defeat against the Buffalo Bills. He was placed on the Injured Reserve, for the first time in his career after suffering an ankle injury. He also became the first Jet defender since 2000 to record a sack and interception on the same drive against the Washington Redskins. To that point, he played in 120 career regular season games with 85 starts. He had recorded 680 tackles, 18.5 sacks, four INTs, 18 passes deflected, six forced fumbles, and four fumble recoveries in his career. Barton had also posted four seasons with 100 or more total tackles.

=== Cleveland Browns ===
Barton signed with the Cleveland Browns as an unrestricted free agent on March 13, 2009, and played 2 years with them. Up to the 2010 NFL season, after 12 years of play, he is the only player still active in the NFL among those drafted in the fifth round of the 1999 NFL draft. On February 9, 2011, Barton was released by the Browns.

=== Personal life ===
Barton was adopted and met his brother, Aaron Curry, a former NFL linebacker, and his birth mother, Chris Curry, for the first time on October 30, 2010.
