= List of Texas Tech Red Raiders football honorees =

The Texas Tech Red Raiders college football team represents Texas Tech University in the National Collegiate Athletic Association (NCAA) Division I Football Bowl Subdivision as a member of the Big 12 Conference's South Division. Texas Tech players and coaches of exceptional ability have received various accolades.

== All-Americans ==
Each year, numerous publications and organizations release lists of All-America teams, hypothetical rosters of players considered the best in the nation at their respective positions. Some selecting organizations choose more than one roster of All-Americans, in which case they use the terms "first team", "second team", and "third team" as appropriate. College Sports Information Directors of America awards similar All-American honors with a focus on academic achievements.

The National Collegiate Athletic Association, a college sports governing body, uses officially recognized All-America selectors to determine the "consensus" selections. These are based on a point system in which a player is awarded three points for every selector that names him to the first team, two points for the second team, and one point for the third team. The individual who receives the most points at his position is called a consensus All-American. Over time, the sources used to determine the consensus selections have changed, and since 2002, the NCAA has used five selectors, the Associated Press (AP), American Football Coaches Association (AFCA), Football Writers Association of America (FWAA), The Sporting News (TSN), and the Walter Camp Football Foundation (WCFF), to determine consensus All-Americans.

In 1935, end Herschel Ramsey was the first Texas Tech player to be named an All-American. Twenty-five years later in 1960, linebacker E. J. Holub became Texas Tech's first consensus All-American. Texas Tech players have earned consensus All-America honors 12 times: E. J. Holub in 1960, Donny Anderson in 1965, Dan Irons in 1977, Gabriel Rivera in 1982, Mark Bounds in 1991, Zach Thomas in 1995, Byron Hanspard in 1996, Montae Reagor in 1998, Michael Crabtree in 2007 and 2008, Brandon Carter in 2008, and Jace Amaro in 2013.

=== All-Americans ===
Year	Name	Position	First Team (36)	Second Team	Third Team	Honorable Mention	Miscellaneous
1935	Herschel Ramsey	End	Little All-America team				
1938	Leonard Latch	Offensive Tackle	"All-America team of Unsung Heroes"				
1938	Elmer Tarbox	Running Back				Honorable Mention	
1938	A.B.(ABE) Murphy	Offensive Tackle	N/A				
1945	Walt Schlinkman	Offensive Back				Honorable Mention	
1945	Walt Schlinkman	Offensive Back	Little All-America team				
1951	Jerell Price	Offensive Tackle		AP			
1951	Bobby Cavazos	Running Back				Honorable Mention	
1952	Bobby Cavazos	Running Back				Honorable Mention	
1953	Bobby Cavazos	Running Back		AP	Third Team	Honorable Mention	
1954	Jerry Walker	Offensive Tackle				Honorable Mention	
1954	Jim Sides	Running Back				Honorable Mention	
1954	Claude Harland	End				Honorable Mention	
1956	Barton Massey	Center				Honorable Mention	
1976	Mike Sears	Offensive Guard				Honorable Mention	
1959	E. J. Holub	Center/Linebacker	NEA, FWAA,	AP, CP			
1960	E. J. Holub	Center/Linebacker	Consensus All-American NEA, FWAA, AFCA, UPI, WC, AP, CP, Time, TSN				
1963	Dave Parks	Split End	AP, TSN				
1964	Donny Anderson	Running Back	AFCA, AP, NEA, FWAA, Time, TSN, FN				
1965	Donny Anderson	Running Back	Consensus All-American NEA, FWAA, AFCA, UPI, WC, AP, Time, TSN, FN	CP			
1966	Larry Gilbert	Wide Receiver					
1967	Phil Tucker	Offensive Guard	NEA				
1968	Kenny Vinyard	Kicker	TSN				
1968	Don King	Offensive Guard		AP	CP		
1969	Denton Fox	Defensive Back	FWAA	AP			
1970	Ken Perkins	Defensive Back				Honorable Mention	
1972	Donald Rives	Defensive Tackle		AP			
1973	Andre Tillman	Tight End	AP				
1974	Ecomet Burley	Defensive End		NEA			
1976	Thomas Howard	Linebacker	AFCA, College Football News, WC	AP			
1977	Dan Irons	Offensive Tackle	Consensus All-American AFCA, UPI, FN, WC				
1978	James Hadnot	Running Back			AP		
1980	Ted Watts	Defensive Back	TSN	NEA		Honorable Mention	
1980	Gabriel Rivera	Defensive Tackle				Honorable Mention	
1981	Gabriel Rivera	Defensive Tackle				Honorable Mention	
1982	Gabriel Rivera	Defensive Tackle	Consensus All-American AFCA, GSN, AP	UPI			
1986	Brad Hastings	Linebacker			FN		
1988	Tyrone Thurman	Kick Returner	AP				
1989	Charles Odiorne	Offensive Tackle	TSN		AP		
1989	James Gray	Running Back		UPI, AP			
1991	Mark Bounds	Punter	Unanimous All-American AFCA, AP, FWAA, UPI, WC, FN, NEA, SH, TSN				
1991	Tracy Saul	Defensive Back		UPI	AP		
1992	Lloyd Hill	Wide Receiver	AFCA, UPI, FN, TSN	AP			
1993	Bam Morris	Running Back	GSN	AP			
1994	Zach Thomas	Linebacker	AFCA	AP			
1995	Marcus Coleman	Defensive Back	FWAA	AFCA, UPI			
1995	Zach Thomas	Linebacker	Unanimous All-American AFCA, AP, FWAA, UPI, WC, FN, TSN				
1996	Byron Hanspard	Running Back	Unanimous All-American FWAA, AFCA, WC, AP, FN				
1996	Ben Kaufman	Offensive Tackle			AP		
1997	Montae Reagor	Defensive End		Second Team			
1998	Montae Reagor	Defensive End	Consensus All-American FWAA, AFCA, WC, AP, TSN				
1998	Ricky Williams	Running Back		Second Team	Third Team		
2000	Kevin Curtis	Strong Safety		Second Team			
2001	Kevin Curtis	Free Safety		Second Team			
2001	Lawrence Flugence	Linebacker			AP		
2001	Aaron Hunt	Defensive End			FN		
2004	Trey Haverty	Wide Receiver		SI	AP		
2005	Dwayne Slay	Free Safety	SI				
2007	Michael Crabtree	Wide Receiver	Unanimous All-American FWAA, AFCA, WC, AP, TSN, SI, ESPN, CBS Sports, College Football News, Rivals.com, Scout.com				
2008	Brandon Carter	Offensive Guard	Consensus All-American AFCA, TSN	AP			
2008	Michael Crabtree	Wide Receiver	Unanimous All-American FWAA, AFCA, WC, AP, TSN, SI, ESPN, Pro Football Weekly, CBS Sports, College Football News, Rivals.com, Scout.com				
2008	Graham Harrell	Quarterback	AFCA				
2008	Rylan Reed	Offensive Tackle	WC, SI				
2008	Louis Vasquez	Offensive Guard		Rivals.com	AP		
2009	Brandon Carter	Offensive Guard		Second Team			
2009	Brandon Sharpe	Defensive End			TSN		
2013	Jace Amaro	Tight End	Unanimous All-American FWAA, AFCA, WC, AP, TSN, SI, ESPN, Pro Football Weekly, CBS Sports, USA Today, Athlon, Fox Sports				
2015	Le'Raven Clark	Offensive Tackle		CBS Sports			
2015	Jakeem Grant	All-purpose / return specialist		CBS Sports	AP		
2018	Antoine Wesley	Wide Receiver	FWAA				
2019	Jordyn Brooks	Linebacker		FWAA, AFCA, WC, AP, The Athletic, PFF			
2022	Tyree Wilson	Defensive Line	FWAA, USA Today, The Athletic	AP			

=== Academic All American ===
Year	Player name	Position
1970	Dicky Ingrom	K
1972	Jeff Jobe	E
1975	Ricky Bates	RB
1979	Maury Buford	P
1980	Maury Buford	P
1980	Jeff McKinney	LB
1983	Chuck Alexander	DB
1989	Tom Mathiasmeier	DE
1992	Robert King	P
1993	Robert King	P
1999	Keith Cockrum	LB
2002	Kliff Kingsbury	QB
2012	Cody Davis	SS

== All-conference honorees ==
=== Border Intercollegiate Athletic Association ===
Year	Name	Position
1955	Hal Broadfoot	G
1955	Bill Herchmann	T
1955	Don Schmidt	HB
1955	James Sides	FB
1955	Jerry Walker	T
1954	Hal Broadfoot	G
1954	Walter Bryan	HB
1954	Claude Harland	DE
1954	Bill Herchmann	T
1954	Jerry Johnson	QB
1954	Bob Kilcullen	T
1954	James Sides	FB
1954	Rick Spinks	HB
1954	Jerry Walker	T
1954	Arlen Wesley	G
1954	Dwayne West	C
1954	Dean White	DE
1953	Bobby Cavazos	RB
1953	Don Gray	G
1953	Jack Kirkpatrick	QB
1953	James Sides	HB
1953	Vic Spooner	DE
1953	Jerry Walker	T
1953	Jimmy Williams	T
1952	Bobby Cavazos	HB
1952	Hollis Davis	T
1952	Ray Howard	G
1952	Jim Turner	HB
1951	Junior Arterbrun	QB
1951	Bobby Cavazos	RB
1951	Ray Howard	G
1951	Aubrey Phillips	C
1951	Jerrell Price	T
1951	Jim Turner	HB
1950	Robert Broyles	G
1950	Jerrell Price	T
1949	James Conley	FB
1949	Marshall Gettys	T
1949	Dan Pursel	G
1949	Calvin Stevenson	HB
1948	John Andrews	T
1948	Marshall Gettys	T
1948	Ernest Hawkins	QB
1948	Bill Kelley	DE
1948	Dorrell McCurry	G
1948	Dan Pursel	G
1947	Fred Brown	QB
1947	Roland Nabors	C
1947	Ed Smith	HB
1947	Joe Smith	DE
1947	Bernie Winkler	T
1946	Clyde Hall	T
1946	Floyd Lawhorn	G
1946	Roland Nabors	C
1946	Ed Robnett	FB
1946	Roger Smith	HB
1946	Bernie Winkler	T
1942	Will Allbright	G
1942	Don Austin	Back
1942	J.R. Calahan	Back
1942	Doyle Caraway	G
1942	Walter Schlinkman	Back
1942	Joe Smith	DE
1942	George Zoller	T
1941	Tyrus Bain	QB
1941	Charles Dvoracek	FB
1937	Lewis Jones	G
1937	Floyd Owens	G
1937	Herschel Ramsey	DE
1937	Elmer Tarbox	HB
1936	William Holcomb	T
1936	Jim Neill	HB
1936	Herschel Ramsey	DE
1936	Tom Wiginton	C
1935	Charles Duvall	QB
1935	Walker Nichols	G
1934	Mule Dowell	HB
1934	Pete Owens	G
1934	Lawrence Priddy	C
1933	Elva Baker	DE
1933	Matt Hitchcock	DE

=== Southwest Conference ===
Year	Name	Position
1960	E.J. Holub	C
1962	David Parks	SE
1963	David Parks	SE
1963	Donny Anderson	HB
1964	Teddy Roberts	S
1964	Donny Anderson	HB
1965	Tom Wilson	QB
1965	Donny Anderson	HB
1966	Mike Leinert	HB
1966	Larry Gilbert	SE
1967	Jerry Turner	C
1967	Phil Tucker	OL
1967	Ed Mooney	LB
1967	Mike Leinert	HB

=== Big 12 Conference ===
==== First Team ====
Year	Player name	Position
2019	Douglas Coleman	DB
2019	Jordyn Brooks	LB
2019	Austin McNamara	P
2018	Dakota Allen	LB
2018	Adrian Frye	DB
2018	Clayton Hatfield	K
2015	Deandre Washington	RB
2015	Le'Raven Clark	OL
2014	Le'Raven Clark	OL
2013	Jace Amaro	TE
2013	Will Smith	LB
2013	Le'Raven Clark	OL
2012	LaAdrian Waddle	OL
2009	Brandon Carter	OL
2009	Brandon Sharpe	DL
2008	Michael Crabtree	WR
2008	Daniel Charbonnet	DB
2008	Brandon Williams	DL
2008	Darcel McBath	DL
2007	Michael Crabtree	WR
2007	Alex Trlica	PK
2006	Joel Filani	WR
2005	Taurean Henderson	RB
2005	Jarrett Hicks	WR
2005	Joel Filani	WR
2005	Dwayne Slay	DB
2004	Jarrett Hicks	WR
2004	Danny Amendola	KR
2004	Adell Duckett	DE
2003	Wes Welker	KR
2003	Mickey Peters	WR
2002	Kliff Kingsbury	QB
2001	Ricky Williams	RB
2000	Kevin Curtis	SS
1999	Kevin Curtis	KR
1999	Johnathan Gray	OL
1998	Montae Reagor	DE
1998	Taurus Rucker	DL
1997	Dane Johnson	DB
1997	Montae Reagor	DE
1996	Byron Hanspard	RB

==== Second Team ====
Year	Player name	Position
2019	Travis Bruffy	OL
2019	Eli Howard	DE
2018	Antoine Wesley	WR
2018	Jack Anderson	OL
2017	Dakota Allen	LB
2017	Jah'shawn Johnson	S
2017	Justus Parker	DB
2017	Keke Coutee	WR
2016	Jonathan Giles	WR
2016	Patrick Mahomes	QB
2015	Jakeem Grant	KR
2014	Deandre Washington	RB
2014	Pete Robertson	LB
2013	Kerry Hyder	DT
2013	Eric Ward	WR
2012	Darrin Moore	WR
2009	Daniel Howard	DL
2012	Jace Amaro	TE
2012	Kerry Hyder	DL
2011	LaAdrian Waddle	OL
2012	Cody Davis	DB
2012	D.J. Johnson	DB
2010	Lonnie Edwards	OL
2010	Colby Whitlock	OL
2009	Jamar Wall	DB
2008	Shannon Woods	RB
2008	Louis Vasquez	OL
2008	Rylan Reed	OL
2007	Graham Harrell	QB
2006	Glenn January	OL
2006	Keyunta Dawson	DL
2005	Cody Hodges	QB
2005	Robert Johnson	WR
2005	Manuel Ramnirez	OL
2005	E.J. Whitley	OL
2005	Keyunta Dawson	DL
2005	Vincent Meeks	DB
2004	Dylan Gandy	C
2004	Daniel Loper	OL
2004	Dylan Gandy	C
2004	Mike Smith	LB
2003	Ryan Aycock	SS
2003	Daniel Loper	OL
2003	B. J. Symons	QB
2002	Lawrence Flugence	LB
2002	Wes Welker	KR
2001	Kevin Curtis	SS
2001	Lawrence Flugence	LB
2001	Aaron Hunt	DE
2001	Kliff Kingsbury	QB
2001	Rex Richards	OL
2000	Tim Baker	WR
2000	Lawrence Flugence	LB
1999	Kris Kocurek	DT
1999	Curtis Lowery	OL
1999	Sammy Morris	RB
1999	Taurus Rucker	DE
1998	Donnie Hart	WR
1998	Curtis Lowry	OL
1998	John NOrman	PR
1998	Ricky Williams	RB
1997	Donnie Hart	WR
1997	Cody McGuire	DL
1997	Jay Pugh	C
1996	Ben Kaufman	OL
1996	Zebbie Lethridge	QB

== College Football Hall of Fame inductees ==
Seven Red Raider players, Donny Anderson, Hub Bechtol, E. J. Holub, Byron Hanspard, Dave Parks, Gabriel Rivera, and Zach Thomas, have been inducted into the College Football Hall of Fame.

== Retired jerseys ==
Retired football jerseys
Number	Player	Year
44	Donny Anderson	1995
55	E.J. Holub	1960
81	Dave Parks	2009

Three Red Raider football players have had their jersey numbers retired. E.J. Holub's No. 55 was retired on Dec. 19, 1960, and Donny Anderson's No. 44 was retired Nov. 11, 1995. Dave Parks's No. 81 jersey was retired Nov. 17, 2001. Both Holub and Anderson are members of the College Football Hall of Fame.

== Trophies and awards ==
AT&T ESPN All-America Player of the Year

- Michael Crabtree (2007)
- Graham Harrell (2008)

CBSSports.com Freshman of the Year

- Michael Crabtree (2007)

Doak Walker Award

- Bam Morris (1993)
- Byron Hanspard (1996)

Fred Biletnikoff Award

- Michael Crabtree (2007, 2008)

Johnny Unitas Golden Arm Award

- Graham Harrell (2008)

Mosi Tatupu Award

- Wes Welker (2003)

Paul Warfield Trophy

- Michael Crabtree (2007, 2008)

Sammy Baugh Trophy

- Kliff Kingsbury (2002)
- B. J. Symons (2003)
- Graham Harrell (2007)
- Patrick Mahomes (2016)

Sporting News College Football Player of the Year

- Donny Anderson (1965)
- Graham Harrell (2008)

Touchdown Club of Columbus' Freshman of the Year

- Michael Crabtree (2007)

Big 12 Conference Defensive Player of the Year

- Dwayne Slay (2005)

Big 12 Conference Defensive Newcomer of the Year

- McKinner Dixon (2008)

Big 12 Conference Offensive Freshman of the Year

- Shaud Williams (1999)
- Michael Crabtree (2007)
- Baker Mayfield (2013)

Big 12 Conference Offensive Newcomer of the Year

- Robert Johnson (2005)

Southwest Conference Defensive Player of the Year

- Gabriel Rivera (1982)

== Texas Tech Ring of Honor ==
Texas Tech announced the creation of the Football Ring of Honor in June 2012. The Ring of Honor consists of an "elite group of players and coaches that made outstanding contributions to Red Raider Football." Each player in the ring of honor has his name permanently added to the interior of the stadium on the West building.

=== Ring of Honor Members ===
Player	Position	Career	Inducted
Donny Anderson	RB	1963–1965	2012
E. J. Holub	C/LB	1958–1960	2012
Dave Parks	SE	1961–1963	2012
Gabe Rivera	DL	1979–1982	2014
Zach Thomas	LB	1993–1995	2016
Michael Crabtree	WR	2006–2008	2021
Elmer Tarbox	HB/DB	1936–1938	2021
Patrick Mahomes II	QB	2014–2016	2022
Thomas Howard	LB	1974–1976	2024
Andre Tillman	TE	1971–1973	2024
Wes Welker	WR/PR	2000–2003	2024
Graham Harrell	QB	2004–2008	2025
