= 2007 New York Jets season =

2007 season of NFL team New York Jets

- Owner: Woody and Christopher Johnson
- General manager: Mike Tannenbaum
- Head coach: Eric Mangini
- Home stadium: Giants Stadium

Results
- Record: 4–12
- Division place: 3rd AFC East
- Playoffs: Did not qualify
- Pro Bowlers: None

Uniform
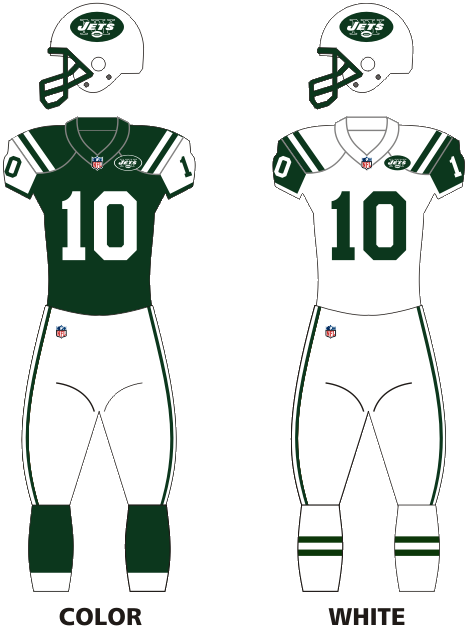

The 2007 season was the New York Jets' 38th season in the National Football League (NFL), their 48th season overall, and their second under head coach Eric Mangini. The team attempted to improve upon their 10 wins in the 2006 season, but only finished with a 4–12 record.

== Offseason ==
=== Player transactions ===
==== Free agents heading into the 2007 season ====
Player name	Position	Tag type (Note: Free agent tag types are UFA (unrestricted free agent) and RFA (restricted free agent). Unrestricted free agents may be signed by any team in the league with no rights held by the previous team. Restricted free agents may be signed by any team in the league; however, the previous team is compensated for the loss of that player.)	Compensation (Note: Applies only to restricted free agents. All players are subject to a right of first refusal (ROFR); however, if a team is not entitled to any compensation from the loss of that player, it is noted that the player is only subject to an ROFR. Players with no qualifying offer (NQO) are noted as well, and may be signed by any team in the league, with the previous team receiving no compensation for the loss of that player.)	Date signed	Team signed with
B. J. Askew	Running back	UFA		March 4	Buccaneers
Dave Ball	Defensive end	RFA	No qualifying offer	March 26	Panthers
Anthony Clement	Offensive tackle	UFA		March 19	Jets
James Hodgins	Running back	UFA			
Rashad Moore	Defensive tackle	RFA	No qualifying offer		Patriots
Sean Ryan	Tight end	RFA	Fifth-round pick		Jets
Wade Smith	Center	UFA		March 10	Jets
Cody Spencer	Linebacker	RFA	Sixth-round pick		Jets

==== Signings ====
The Jets signed defensive end Michael Haynes on March 22. Haynes played three seasons with the Chicago Bears, but was cut before the beginning of last season.

Marques Tuiasosopo was signed by the Jets on March 23 after spending six seasons with the Oakland Raiders. He and Kellen Clemens will compete for the role of backup quarterback behind starter Chad Pennington.

Among the more notable free agent signings during the offseason was the acquisition of defensive end Andre Wadsworth on March 26. Wadsworth was the third overall pick in the 1998 NFL draft, but had been out of football since 2000 — when he was cut by the Arizona Cardinals — due to several knee injuries and subsequent operations that kept him off the field.

==== Departures ====
The Jets released backup quarterback Patrick Ramsey on March 2. Ramsey was slated to be the primary backup behind Chad Pennington in 2006, but only played one snap under center during the regular season.

Perhaps the most expected departure was the retirement of Curtis Martin on July 26. Martin was the fourth-leading rusher in NFL history at the time of his retirement with 14,101 yards. He hadn't played since week 12 of the 2005 season with a bone-on-bone knee injury ending his season. He was placed on the Physically Unable to Perform list last season before being placed on injured reserve in week 8.

==== Trades ====
The Jets addressed a need at running back on March 6 by acquiring Thomas Jones from the Chicago Bears. The Jets' rushing offense ranked among the bottom teams in the NFL in 2006. In addition to Jones, the Jets received the 63rd pick in the 2007 NFL draft, in exchange for the Jets' 37th pick, which the Jets acquired from the Washington Redskins last year. Jones then signed a four-year, $20 million deal with the team.

On August 23, the Jets agreed to trade disgruntled offensive lineman Pete Kendall to the Redskins, in exchange for the Redskins’ fifth-round pick in the 2008 NFL draft, which could become their fourth-round pick in 2009 depending on how much Kendall plays this season. Kendall had asked the Jets for a $1 million raise to his $1.7 million 2007 salary, which the Jets had refused, since Kendall had already renegotiated his contract prior to the 2006 season. He subsequently asked to be traded or released, and made his frustrations known to the media. During the preseason, Kendall practiced at center and played at that position in the Jets' preseason game against the Minnesota Vikings on August 17. The experiment resulted in two botched shotgun snaps for the Jets, one of which was converted into a defensive touchdown for the Vikings.

=== 2007 NFL draft ===
The Jets were granted the 25th pick in the first round of the annual college draft. The draft took place on April 28 and 29 in New York City.

The team was especially busy on draft day, making two big moves to move up in the order. First, they traded the 25th pick in the first round, along with their second (59th overall) and fifth-round (164th) picks to the Carolina Panthers for their first-round (14th) and sixth-round (191st) picks. They used the 14th pick on cornerback Darrelle Revis from the University of Pittsburgh. Later, they traded their other second-round pick (63rd) with their third (89th) and the sixth-round pick acquired from Carolina to the Green Bay Packers for their second (47th) and seventh-round (235th) picks. The four players taken by the Jets represent the smallest draft class in franchise history.

2007 New York Jets draft
Round	Pick	Player	Position	College	Notes
1	14	Darrelle Revis *	CB	Pittsburgh	from Carolina
2	47	David Harris	ILB	Michigan	from Green Bay
6	177	Jacob Bender	OT	Nicholls State	from Tampa Bay
7	235	Chansi Stuckey	WR	Clemson	from New York Jets via Green Bay
Made roster * Made at least one Pro Bowl during career

Revis initially did not attend the Jets’ training camp, as he was still in the midst of negotiating his contract. He eventually signed a six-year, $36 million contract on August 15, 21 days after camp had started. Revis was the second-to-last first-round pick to sign a contract with a team, with JaMarcus Russell of the Oakland Raiders the only holdout remaining afterwards. Revis was the first draftee not signed before training camp by the Jets since James Farrior in 1997, and had the longest holdout since Keyshawn Johnson in 1996.

== Staff ==
2007 New York Jets staff
Front office: Owner – Woody Johnson; Head coaches: Head coach – Eric Mangini; Special assistant – Ed Donatell; Offensive coaches: Offensive coordinator – Brian Schottenheimer; Quarterbacks – Brian Daboll; Running backs – Jimmy Raye; Wide receivers – Noel Mazzone; Tight ends – Jason Michael; Offensive line – Tony Wise; Assistant offensive line – Mike Devlin; Offensive quality control – Brian Smith	Defensive coaches: Defensive coordinator – Bob Sutton; Defensive line coach – Dan Quinn; Assistant defensive line – Bryan Cox; Linebackers – Jim Herrmann; Defensive backs – Mike MacIntyre; Assistant defensive backs – Jerome Henderson; Defensive quality control/coaches' assistant – Andy Dickerson; Minority intern – Al Holcomb; Special teams coaches: Special teams coordinator – Mike Westhoff; Special teams quality control/defensive quality control – Ben Kotwica; Strength and conditioning: Strength and conditioning – Sal Alosi; Assistant strength and conditioning/nutrition coordinator – Rick Lyle

== Roster ==
2007 New York Jets roster
Quarterbacks (QB): 11 Kellen Clemens; 10 Chad Pennington; 8 Marques Tuiasosopo; Running backs (RB): 20 Thomas Jones; 29 Leon Washington; Wide receivers (WR): 18 David Ball; 89 Jerricho Cotchery; 19 Chris Davis; 81 Justin McCareins; 16 Brad Smith KR; 15 Wallace Wright; Tight ends (TE): 86 Chris Baker; 40 Joe Kowalewski; 82 Jason Pociask; 88 Sean Ryan	Offensive linemen (OL): 72 Jacob Bender G/T; 61 Adrien Clarke G; 68 Anthony Clement T; 60 D'Brickashaw Ferguson T; 74 Nick Mangold C; 66 Will Montgomery G; 65 Brandon Moore G; 76 Clint Oldenburg T; 71 Wade Smith T; 75 Rob Turner G/T; Defensive linemen (DL): 97 Kareem Brown DE; 93 Kenyon Coleman DE; 70 Mike DeVito DE; 92 Shaun Ellis DE; 95 C. J. Mosley DE; 91 Sione Po'uha NT; 63 Dewayne Robertson NT	Linebackers (LB): 50 Eric Barton ILB; 96 David Bowens OLB; 58 Matt Chatham ILB; 52 David Harris ILB; 54 Victor Hobson OLB; 55 Brad Kassell ILB; 94 Marques Murrell OLB; 99 Bryan Thomas OLB; Defensive backs (DB): 36 David Barrett CB; 30 Drew Coleman CB; 26 Erik Coleman SS; 21 Andre Dyson CB; 27 Abram Elam SS; 31 Hank Poteat CB; 24 Darrelle Revis CB; 25 Kerry Rhodes FS; 33 Eric Smith SS; Special teams (ST): 85 James Dearth LS; 7 Ben Graham P; 3 Jeremy Kapinos P; 1 Mike Nugent K	Practice squad: 34 Alvin Banks RB; 17 David Clowney WR (IR); 35 Manny Collins CB; 78 Wayne Hunter T; 46 Jerry Mackey LB; 5 Brett Ratliff QB; 14 Shaine Smith WR; 9 Marco Thomas WR; Reserve: 87 Laveranues Coles WR (IR); 32 Cedric Houston RB (NF-Inj.); 44 James Ihedigbo S (IR); 62 Matt McChesney G (NF-Inj.); 22 Justin Miller CB (IR); 53 Cody Spencer LB (NF-Ill.); 83 Chansi Stuckey WR (IR); 57 Jason Trusnik LB (IR); 45 Stacy Tutt FB (IR); 51 Jonathan Vilma LB (IR); Rookies in italics 53 active, 11 reserve, 8 practice squad

== Preseason ==
Week	Date	Opponent	Result	Record	Venue	Recap
1	August 10	Atlanta Falcons	W 31–16	1–0	Giants Stadium	Recap
2	August 17	Minnesota Vikings	L 20–37	1–1	Giants Stadium	Recap
3	August 25	at New York Giants	W 20–12	2–1	Giants Stadium	Recap
4	August 30	at Philadelphia Eagles	W 13–11	3–1	Lincoln Financial Field	Recap

== Regular season ==
Matchups were determined at the end of the previous season through the league's scheduling formula. In addition to two games each against their traditional AFC East rivals, the team will face teams from the AFC North and NFC East. The Jets will also host the Kansas City Chiefs, marking Herman Edwards' first game against his former team since leaving after the 2005 season, and visit the Tennessee Titans.

The schedule was officially released on April 11. One game—the Jets' Thanksgiving game against the Dallas Cowboys—was announced with the league's opening weekend games on March 26. Game times from weeks 11 through 17 (excluding the aforementioned Cowboys game) were subject to change in accordance with the NFL's flexible scheduling policy. Two games wound up being affected: the game against the Pittsburgh Steelers was moved from a 1:00 p.m. Eastern time start to 4:05 p.m.; the game against the Chiefs was moved from NBC Sunday Night Football to a 4:15 p.m. start on CBS.

=== Schedule ===
Week	Date	Opponent	Result	Record	Venue	Recap
1	September 9	**New England Patriots**	**L** 14–38	0–1	Giants Stadium	Recap
2	September 16	at Baltimore Ravens	**L** 13–20	0–2	M&T Bank Stadium	Recap
3	September 23	**Miami Dolphins**	**W** 31–28	1–2	Giants Stadium	Recap
4	September 30	at **Buffalo Bills**	**L** 14–17	1–3	Ralph Wilson Stadium	Recap
5	October 7	at New York Giants	**L** 24–35	1–4	Giants Stadium	Recap
6	October 14	Philadelphia Eagles	**L** 9–16	1–5	Giants Stadium	Recap
7	October 21	at Cincinnati Bengals	**L** 31–38	1–6	Paul Brown Stadium	Recap
8	October 28	**Buffalo Bills**	**L** 3–13	1–7	Giants Stadium	Recap
9	November 4	Washington Redskins	**L** 20–23 (OT)	1–8	Giants Stadium	Recap
10	Bye					
11	November 18	Pittsburgh Steelers	**W** 19–16 (OT)	2–8	Giants Stadium	Recap
12	November 22	at Dallas Cowboys	**L** 3–34	2–9	Texas Stadium	Recap
13	December 2	at **Miami Dolphins**	**W** 40–13	3–9	Dolphin Stadium	Recap
14	December 9	Cleveland Browns	**L** 18–24	3–10	Giants Stadium	Recap
15	December 16	at **New England Patriots**	**L** 10–20	3–11	Gillette Stadium	Recap
16	December 23	at Tennessee Titans	**L** 6–10	3–12	LP Field	Recap
17	December 30	Kansas City Chiefs	**W** 13–10 (OT)	4–12	Giants Stadium	Recap

Note: Intra-division opponents are in bold text.

=== Standings ===
AFC East
	W	L	T	PCT	DIV	CONF	PF	PA	STK
^{(1)} New England Patriots	16	0	0	1.000	6–0	12–0	589	274	W16
Buffalo Bills	7	9	0	.438	4–2	6–6	252	354	L3
New York Jets	4	12	0	.250	2–4	4–8	268	355	W1
Miami Dolphins	1	15	0	.063	0–6	1–11	267	437	L2

== Regular season game summaries ==
=== Week 1: vs. New England Patriots ===
Quarter	1	2	3	4	Total
Patriots	7	7	14	10	38
Jets	0	7	7	0	14

at Giants Stadium, East Rutherford, New Jersey

- Game time: 1:00 p.m. EDT
- Game weather: Partly cloudy, 84 °F or 28.9 °C
- Game attendance: 77,900
- Referee: Jeff Triplette
- TV announcers (CBS): Jim Nantz and Phil Simms

==== Game summary ====
The Jets began their 2007 campaign at home for a Week 1 divisional match-up with the New England Patriots. In the first quarter, New York immediately trailed as QB Tom Brady completed an 11-yard touchdown pass to WR Wes Welker for the only score of the period. In the second quarter, the Jets tied the game with QB Chad Pennington completing a 7-yard touchdown pass to WR Laveranues Coles. However, the Patriots retook the lead with Brady completing a 5-yard touchdown pass to TE Benjamin Watson.

On the opening kickoff for the third quarter, New York trailed even more as CB Ellis Hobbs returned the kickoff an NFL record 108 yards for a touchdown. Afterwards, New England continued his onslaught as Brady completed a 51-yard touchdown pass to WR Randy Moss. The Jets got their last score of the game when Pennington and Coles hooked up again on a 1-yard touchdown pass. In the fourth quarter, the Patriots took over for the rest of the game as kicker Stephen Gostkowski nailed a 22-yard field goal, while FB Heath Evans ended the game with a 1-yard touchdown run.

With the loss, the Jets began their season at 0–1 while the Patriots began 1–0.

==== Scoring summary ====
Scoring summary
Q	Team	Time	Scoring play	Extra point	Score
1	NE	5:39	Welker 11-yard pass from Brady	Gostkowski kick	NE 7–0
2	NYJ	4:15	Coles 7-yard pass from Pennington	Nugent kick	Tied 7–7
2	NE	1:07	Watson 5-yard pass from Brady	Gostkowski kick	NE 14–7
3	NE	14:46	Hobbs 108-yard kickoff return	Gostkowski kick	NE 21–7
3	NE	7:01	Moss 51-yard pass from Brady	Gostkowski kick	NE 28–7
3	NYJ	2:19	Coles 1-yard pass from Pennington	Nugent kick	NE 28–14
4	NE	6:51	Gostkowski 22-yard field goal		NE 31–14
4	NE	1:58	Evans 1-yard run	Gostkowski kick	NE 38–14

==== Video taping incident ====
On September 10, Patriots coach Bill Belichick was accused by the Jets of authorizing his staff to film the Jets' defensive signals from an onfield location, a violation of league rules. The Jets confiscated the video camera used by video assistant Matt Estrella to film the signals during the game and filed a complaint to the league office, detailing the accusations.

On September 13, Belichick was officially fined $500,000, while the Patriots were also fined $250,000 and forfeited their first round draft pick in the 2008 NFL draft. If the Patriots had missed the playoffs, they would have instead forfeited their second and third round selections in the 2008 draft. Goodell said that he fined the Patriots as a team because Belichick is effectively the team's general manager as well as head coach and exercises so much control over the Patriots' on-field operations that "his actions and decisions are properly attributed to the club." Goodell considered suspending Belichick, but decided that taking away draft picks would be more severe in the long run.

Belichick later issued a statement in which he apologized for what he called a "mistake" in his interpretation of the rules. However, he denied ever using video tape to gain an advantage while a game was underway.

=== Week 2: at Baltimore Ravens ===
Quarter	1	2	3	4	Total
Jets	0	3	0	10	13
Ravens	7	10	0	3	20

at M&T Bank Stadium, Baltimore, Maryland

- Game time: 4:15 p.m. EDT
- Game weather: Sunny, 69 °F or 20.6 °C
- Game attendance: 71,246
- Referee: Scott Green
- TV announcers (CBS): Dick Enberg and Randy Cross

==== Game summary ====
Though Chad Pennington was active and in uniform for the Jets, the team erred on the side of caution due to injured right ankle, instead starting second-year backup Kellen Clemens, who was making his first career start. The Ravens’ defense welcomed him rudely on his first drive with an interception by Ed Reed. The Ravens were able to attain good field position consistently throughout the first half, and quarterback Kyle Boller (who himself was starting in place of an injured starting quarterback, Steve McNair), capitalized with a two-yard touchdown to Willis McGahee late in the first quarter. The teams traded field goals to start the second quarter; Jets kicker Mike Nugent hit a 50-yard field goal, followed by Matt Stover hitting a 28-yard attempt for the Ravens. After Stover missed a 46-yard try, the Jets tried to respond with Nugent attempting a 52-yard field goal, but Nugent missed wide left, his first miss in 20 attempts dating back to last season. Boller once again took advantage of the short field provided and hit tight end Todd Heap on a four-yard touchdown with six seconds left in the half to extend the Ravens’ lead to 17–3. Heap's catch was initially ruled incomplete, but the call was subjected to a booth review and reversed, as replays showed he was able to touch both feet within the end zone.

After a quiet third quarter, Stover hit a 43-yard field goal to start the fourth quarter, and extended Baltimore's lead to 17. Baltimore's defense, which ranked as the best in the NFL in 2006, was able to shut down Clemens and the Jets for most of the game, but Clemens was able to rally the team in the fourth quarter. Using a no huddle offense, Clemens drove the team down to the Baltimore three-yard line, before the Jets settled for a 21-yard field goal. On the Jets' next possession, 44 and 24-yard strikes by Clemens to Jerricho Cotchery got the Jets to the Ravens’ goal line, where he found tight end Chris Baker for a three-yard touchdown, cutting the Jets' deficit to seven. Though the Jets failed to convert the ensuing onside kick, poor clock management by Boller gave the Jets the ball back with 2:38 left in the game. Clemens immediately found Cotchery on a 50-yard catch-and-run, later followed by a 24-yard pass to Laveranues Coles that brought the Jets’ to the Baltimore seven-yard line with just over a minute to go. Clemens passed to Justin McCareins for a potential touchdown, but the pass was dropped by McCareins. A second pass to McCareins in the end zone deflected off him and into the arms of Ravens linebacker Ray Lewis for the game-ending interception. The loss meant the Jets had gone 8–20 since 2002 in games not started by Chad Pennington.

==== Scoring summary ====
Scoring summary
Q	Team	Time	Scoring play	Extra point	Score
1	BAL	3:36	McGahee 2-yard pass from Boller	Stover kick	BAL 7–0
2	NYJ	13:36	Nugent 50-yard field goal		BAL 7–3
2	BAL	9:37	Stover 28-yard field goal		BAL 10–3
2	BAL	0:06	Heap 4-yard pass from Boller	Stover kick	BAL 17–3
4	BAL	14:57	Stover 43-yard field goal		BAL 20–3
4	NYJ	10:05	Nugent 21-yard field goal		BAL 20–6
4	NYJ	3:12	Baker 3-yard pass from Clemens	Nugent kick	BAL 20–13

=== Week 3: vs. Miami Dolphins ===
Quarter	1	2	3	4	Total
Dolphins	0	13	0	15	28
Jets	7	14	3	7	31

at Giants Stadium, East Rutherford, New Jersey

- Game time: 1:00 p.m. EDT
- Game weather: Clear, 72 °F or 22.2 °C
- Game attendance: 77,197
- Referee: Bill Leavy
- TV announcers (CBS): Greg Gumbel and Dan Dierdorf

==== Game summary ====
Chad Pennington returned under center for the Jets, as they attempted to get their first win of the season against another winless team, the Miami Dolphins. The Jets’ offense got going toward the end of the first quarter with a three-yard touchdown pass from Pennington to Laveranues Coles. The Dolphins responded swiftly as Trent Green and Ronnie Brown led the team on a three-minute drive that culminated on a one-yard run by Brown to tie the score at seven. However, the Jets wasted little time reclaiming the lead. Leon Washington received the ensuing kickoff at the two-yard line and returned it 98 yards for a touchdown and a 14–7 lead. The Dolphins crept back with field goals of 31 and 39 yards by Jay Feely on their next two possessions. Pennington kept the Dolphins at bay with a successful two-minute drill, finding tight end Chris Baker on a four-yard touchdown to close the first half and give the Jets a 21–13 halftime lead.

The Jets attempted to further their lead opening the third quarter, but were stopped short of the goal line and had to settle for a 21-yard Mike Nugent field goal. The Dolphins tried to respond, but the Jets’ defense forced their first takeaway of the season on the ensuing drive, an interception by Kerry Rhodes. Pennington led his offense downfield with the help of several Thomas Jones running plays before he ran into the end zone to give the Jets a 31–13 lead early in the fourth quarter.

Miami did not go down quietly, however. Green quickly marched the Dolphins downfield to set up Brown's two-yard touchdown run. The Dolphins elected to attempt a two-point conversion to cut their deficit to ten; using a Statue of Liberty play, Brown walked into the end zone to complete the conversion. Although the Jets shed several minutes off the clock on their following possession, the Dolphins got the ball back and again were able to move swiftly downfield, where Brown scored his third touchdown on a 22-yard pass from Green. The Dolphins needed to recover an onside kick on the ensuing kickoff to have a chance to tie or win the game, but, despite a penalty moving the ball up 10 yards, were unsuccessful, and Pennington knelt out the clock to give the Jets their first victory of the season.

==== Scoring summary ====
Scoring summary
Q	Team	Time	Scoring play	Extra point	Score
1	NYJ	1:02	Coles 3-yard pass from Pennington	Nugent kick	NYJ 7–0
2	MIA	13:00	Brown 1-yard run	Feely kick	Tied 7–7
2	NYJ	12:47	Washington 98-yard kickoff return	Nugent kick	NYJ 14–7
2	MIA	7:19	Feely 31-yard field goal		NYJ 14–10
2	MIA	1:36	Feely 39-yard field goal		NYJ 14–13
2	NYJ	0:02	Baker 4-yard pass from Pennington	Nugent kick	NYJ 21–13
3	NYJ	7:57	Nugent 21-yard field goal		NYJ 24–13
4	NYJ	12:51	Pennington 2-yard run	Nugent kick	NYJ 31–13
4	MIA	8:56	Brown 2-yard run	Brown run	NYJ 31–21
4	MIA	1:15	Brown 22-yard pass from Green	Feely kick	NYJ 31–28

=== Week 4 at Bills ===
Week Four: New York Jets (1–2) at Buffalo Bills (0–3)

Quarter	1	2	3	4	Total
Jets	0	0	7	7	14
Bills	0	0	7	10	17

at Ralph Wilson Stadium, Orchard Park, New York

- Date: September 30
- Game time: 1:00 p.m. EDT
- Game weather: Sunny, 70 °F or 21.1 °C
- Game attendance: 70,600
- Referee: John Parry
- TV announcers (CBS): Ian Eagle and Solomon Wilcots
- Gamebook

Game information
Top passers
- NYJ – Chad Pennington – 32/39, 291 yards, TD, 2 INT
- BUF – Trent Edwards – 22/28, 234 yards, TD, INT

Top rushers

- NYJ – Thomas Jones – 12 rushes, 35 yards
- BUF – Marshawn Lynch – 23 rushes, 79 yards, TD

Top receivers

- NYJ – Jerricho Cotchery – 8 receptions, 107 yards
- BUF – Lee Evans – 6 receptions, 72 yards

Coming off a divisional home win over the Dolphins, the Jets flew to Ralph Wilson Stadium for an AFC East showdown with the winless Buffalo Bills. After a scoreless first half, New York trailed in the third quarter as Bills RB Marshawn Lynch got a 10-yard touchdown run. The Jets responded with QB Chad Pennington completing a 5-yard touchdown pass to WR Laveranues Coles. In the fourth quarter, New York fell behind Buffalo again as kicker Rian Lindell nailed a 46-yard field goal and QB Trent Edwards completed a 1-yard touchdown pass to TE Michael Gaines. The Jets managed to pull within three as RB Leon Washington got an 8-yard touchdown run. After forcing a three-and-out, New York had one last chance to tie or take the lead. Unfortunately, 8 plays into the drive, Pennington got intercepted by Bills CB Terrence McGee, which secured Buffalo's first win of the year.

With the surprising loss, the Jets fell to 1–3.

Scoring summary

Quarter	Time	Drive			Team	Scoring information	Score	
Quarter	Time	Plays	Yards	TOP	Team	Scoring information	NYJ	BUF
3	6:44	10	56	6:20	Bills	Marshawn Lynch 10-yard touchdown run, Rian Lindell kick good	0	7
3	2:13	7	78	4:31	Jets	Laveranues Coles 5-yard touchdown reception from Chad Pennington, Mike Nugent kick good	7	7
4	10:49	12	65	6:24	Bills	46-yard field goal by Rian Lindell	7	10
4	6:56	6	25	3:05	Bills	Michael Gaines 1-yard touchdown reception from Trent Edwards, Rian Lindell kick good	7	17
4	3:02	11	64	3:54	Jets	Leon Washington 8-yard touchdown run, Mike Nugent kick good	14	17
"TOP" = time of possession. For other American football terms, see Glossary of American football.							14	17

=== Week 5: at New York Giants ===
Quarter	1	2	3	4	Total
Jets	7	10	7	0	24
Giants	0	7	14	14	35

at Giants Stadium, East Rutherford, New Jersey

- Game time: 1:00 p.m. EDT
- Game weather: Partly sunny, 81 °F or 27.2 °C
- Game attendance: 78,809
- Referee: Bill Carollo
- TV announcers (CBS): Dick Enberg and Randy Cross

==== Game summary ====
The Jets played a rare road game at home, as they took on their intracity rivals (and stadium co-tenants), the New York Giants. Both offenses were slow to start through the first quarter, though the Jets’ defense capitalized when Giants running back Brandon Jacobs fumbled at his own 11-yard line, which was picked up by safety Kerry Rhodes for a touchdown. The Jets had a chance to extend the lead later in the period, but Mike Nugent missed a 42-yard field goal. The Giants responded on the ensuing drive with an eight-yard touchdown by Derrick Ward. The deadlock was broken toward the end of the first half when Chad Pennington led the Jets on a 93-yard drive with less than two minutes in the half, ending on a 16-yard touchdown pass to Brad Smith. The Jets were able to tack on a 47-yard field goal by Nugent to end the half, after they got the ball back on an interception of Giants quarterback Eli Manning by Jonathan Vilma, taking a 17–7 lead into the locker room.

The Giants went to work when they opened the second half, getting a 19-yard touchdown run from Jacobs to cut the Jets’ lead to three. The lead was restored back to ten, however, when Leon Washington returned the ensuing kickoff 98 yards for a touchdown. Later in the quarter, Manning led the Giants downfield and completed a 13-yard pass to tight end Jeremy Shockey for a touchdown. Pennington attempted to respond by leading the Jets deep into Giants territory early in the fourth quarter, but he floated a pass toward the end zone which was intercepted at the two-yard line by cornerback Aaron Ross. Despite the bad field position, Manning eventually found Plaxico Burress on a 53-yard touchdown pass to put the Giants ahead, 28–24. The Jets tried to get back ahead later in the period, but Pennington was intercepted again by Ross (Pennington's third of the afternoon), who took it 43 yards for what was effectively the game-sealing touchdown. One last attempt by the Jets to score yielded no positive yardage, and the Giants ran out the clock to preserve the victory.

==== Scoring Summary ====
Scoring summary
Q	Team	Time	Scoring play	Extra point	Score
1	NYJ	8:36	Rhodes 11-yard fumble return	Nugent kick	NYJ 7–0
2	NYG	10:54	Ward 8-yard run	Tynes kick	Tied 7–7
2	NYJ	0:33	Smith 16-yard pass from Pennington	Nugent kick	NYJ 14–7
2	NYJ	0:00	Nugent 47-yard field goal		NYJ 17–7
3	NYG	11:17	Jacobs 19-yard run	Tynes kick	NYJ 17–14
3	NYJ	11:03	Washington 98-yard kickoff return	Nugent kick	NYJ 24–14
3	NYG	0:33	Shockey 13-yard pass from Manning	Tynes kick	NYJ 24–21
4	NYG	7:52	Burress 53-yard pass from Manning	Tynes kick	NYG 28–24
4	NYG	3:15	Ross 43-yard interception return	Tynes kick	NYG 35–24

=== Week 6: vs. Philadelphia Eagles ===
Quarter	1	2	3	4	Total
Eagles	7	3	6	0	16
Jets	3	3	0	3	9

at Giants Stadium, East Rutherford, New Jersey

- Game time: 1:00 p.m. EDT
- Game weather: Clear, 62 °F or 16.7 °C
- Game attendance: 77,189
- Referee: Gerry Austin
- TV announcers (Fox): Matt Vasgersian, Daryl Johnston, and Tony Siragusa

==== Game summary ====
Trying to snap a two-game skid, the Jets stayed at home, donned their throwback New York Titans uniforms, and played their Week 6 interconference game with the Philadelphia Eagles. In the first quarter, the Jets got off to a fast start with kicker Mike Nugent getting a 30-yard field goal, yet the Eagles took the lead with QB Donovan McNabb completing a 75-yard touchdown pass to WR Kevin Curtis. In the second quarter, Philadelphia increased its lead with kicker David Akers getting a 22-yard field goal. New York responded with Nugent kicking a 21-yard field goal.

In the third quarter, the Jets continued to struggle as Akers gave the Eagles a 31-yard and a 25-yard field goal. In the fourth quarter, New York tried to come back, yet all they got was Nugent's 30-yard field goal.

With their third consecutive loss, the Jets fell to 1–5.

One of the few positives from the game was that RB Thomas Jones ran 100 yards for the 18th time in his career, as he ran 24 times for 130.

==== Scoring summary ====
Scoring summary
Q	Team	Time	Scoring play	Extra point	Score
1	NYJ	11:47	Nugent 30-yard field goal		NYJ 3–0
1	PHI	10:09	Curtis 75-yard pass from McNabb	Akers kick	PHI 7–3
2	PHI	14:52	Akers 22-yard field goal		PHI 10–3
2	NYJ	12:43	Nugent 21-yard field goal		PHI 10–6
3	PHI	8:37	Akers 31-yard field goal		PHI 13–6
3	PHI	1:40	Akers 25-yard field goal		PHI 16–6
4	NYJ	9:28	Nugent 30-yard field goal		PHI 16–9

=== Week 7: at Cincinnati Bengals ===
Quarter	1	2	3	4	Total
Jets	7	13	3	8	31
Bengals	3	7	7	21	38

at Paul Brown Stadium, Cincinnati, Ohio

- Game time: 4:05 p.m. EDT
- Game weather: Sunny and clear, 77 °F or 25 °C
- Game attendance: 65,868
- Referee: Tony Corrente
- TV announcers (CBS): Ian Eagle and Solomon Wilcots

==== Game summary ====
Reeling from three straight losses, the Jets made some changes in the lineup, moving Darrelle Revis and inserting Hank Poteat and Abram Elam. QB Chad Pennington got off to a quick start, completing a 57-yard pass to Laveranues Coles. Both New York and Cincinnati were able to move the ball back and forth in the first half, ending the half with the Jets on top 20–10.

The fourth quarter eventually proved to be the Jets undoing, however. After giving up a touchdown in the third quarter to make the score 23–17, the Jets gave up three touchdowns and only scored their last touchdown in the closing seconds of the game, ending with a 38–31 loss. The fourth quarter was marked by many mistakes, including a costly pass interference by Darrelle Revis and a fumble and interception by Chad Pennington. The pass interference kept a Bengals drive alive, and the fumble gave the Bengals the ball at midfield. Finally, with 50 seconds left in the game, Pennington throws a hurried pass into the hands of Bengal Johnathan Joseph, who runs the ball 42 yards for the game-sealing touchdown.

After the game, coach Eric Mangini refused to endorse Chad Pennington as the quarterback for next week's game against the Buffalo Bills, stating that he'd "need to look at the tape," indicating a possible change to Kellen Clemens.

==== Scoring summary ====
Scoring summary
Q	Team	Time	Scoring play	Extra point	Score
1	NYJ	10:23	Coles 57-yard pass from Pennington	Nugent kick	NYJ 7–0
1	CIN	5:47	Graham 20-yard field goal		NYJ 7–3
2	NYJ	11:38	Nugent 24-yard field goal		NYJ 10–3
2	NYJ	9:11	Nugent 35-yard field goal		NYJ 13–3
2	CIN	2:08	Watson 3-yard run	Graham kick	NYJ 13–10
2	NYJ	0:49	Coles 36-yard pass from Pennington	Nugent kick	NYJ 20–10
3	NYJ	11:15	Nugent 43-yard field goal		NYJ 23–10
3	CIN	3:41	Houshmandzadeh 3-yard pass from Palmer	Graham kick	NYJ 23–17
4	CIN	13:31	Watson 1-yard run	Graham kick	CIN 24–23
4	CIN	6:09	Watson 2-yard run	Graham kick	CIN 31–23
4	CIN	0:37	Joseph 42-yard interception return	Graham kick	CIN 38–23
4	NYJ	0:00	Cotchery 32-yard pass from Pennington	Washington pass from Pennington	CIN 38–31

=== Week 8: vs. Buffalo Bills ===
Quarter	1	2	3	4	Total
Bills	3	0	0	10	13
Jets	0	3	0	0	3

at Giants Stadium, East Rutherford, New Jersey

- Game time: 4:05 p.m. EDT
- Game weather: Clear, 56 °F (13 °C)
- Game attendance: 76,688
- Referee: Jerome Boger
- TV announcers (CBS): Gus Johnson and Steve Tasker

==== Game summary ====
Before the game, the Jets learned linebacker Jonathan Vilma was lost for the season with a knee injury. Both teams began the game with lengthy drives that ended in field goals, consuming nearly the first 20 minutes of the game. Neither team could generate much offense after that. An interception from Bills quarterback Trent Edwards and a fumble on a trick play by the Jets' Leon Washington ended the only serious attempts either team made at scoring in the second quarter.

"It's not the same movie. It's the same ending."
~Eric Mangini on the Jets’ fortunes in 2007.

Edwards sprained his right wrist in the third quarter and was replaced by his backup, former starter J. P. Losman. Losman led Buffalo downfield early in the fourth quarter, and the Bills took a 6–3 lead on a 40-yard field goal by Rian Lindell. On the Bills’ next possession, Losman threw downfield from his own 15-yard line, and found Lee Evans, who, after wrestling the ball away from Darrelle Revis, ran untouched for 43 yards into the end zone to give the Bills a 13–3 lead. Revis appeared to have a chance to intercept the ball, but Jets’ safety Abram Elam ran into Revis, allowing Evans to claim the ball.

After the touchdown, and with 3:38 left to play, Jets quarterback Chad Pennington was replaced by backup Kellen Clemens. Clemens twice attempted to drive the Jets for a score, but both drives ended in interceptions, including one on a Hail Mary that ended the game. The Bills held on for the 13–3 victory, as the Jets were swept by Buffalo for the first time since 1997.

==== Scoring summary ====
Scoring summary
Q	Team	Time	Scoring play	Extra point	Score
1	BUF	4:53	Lindell 30-yard field goal		BUF 3–0
2	NYJ	10:28	Nugent 27-yard field goal		Tied 3–3
4	BUF	10:06	Lindell 40-yard field goal		BUF 6–3
4	BUF	3:38	Evans 85-yard pass from Losman	Lindell kick	BUF 13–3

=== Week 9: vs. Washington Redskins ===
Quarter	1	2	3	4	OT	Total
Redskins	3	6	3	8	3	23
Jets	10	7	0	3	0	20

at Giants Stadium, East Rutherford, New Jersey

- Game time: 1:00 p.m. EST
- Game weather: 55 °F or 12.8 °C
- Game attendance: 76,663
- Referee: Ron Winter
- TV announcers (Fox): Kenny Albert, Daryl Johnston, and Tony Siragusa

==== Game summary ====
Kellen Clemens was named the starting quarterback on Monday by Coach Eric Mangini, relegating Chad Pennington to the backup role indefinitely. However, Clemens would not be throwing to receiver Laveranues Coles, who ended a 104-game consecutive games played streak due to a concussion.

Leon Washington got the Jets started immediately when he returned the opening kickoff 86 yards for a touchdown. The kickoff return touchdown was his third of the season, setting a Jets record. The teams traded field goals before Clemens led the Jets downfield, where he found tight end Joe Kowalewski on a one-yard touchdown. The Redskins responded with a 40-yard field goal from Shaun Suisham. They then surprised the Jets with an onside kick, which they successfully recovered, leading to another Suisham field goal near the end of the first half.

Suisham continued to keep the Redskins in the game with a 40-yard field goal to start the third quarter, bringing the score to 17–12. The Jets drove deep into Redskins territory early in the fourth quarter when, on a pass completion to Jerricho Cotchery, Cotchery fumbled the ball, and the Redskins recovered. Mangini challenged the call believing the pass was incomplete, and therefore no fumble was possible, but the challenge was not upheld. The Redskins took advantage on the ensuing drive, and running back Clinton Portis, who had a huge game against the porous Jets run defense, scored on a one-yard touchdown to give Washington the lead. A two-point conversion from quarterback Jason Campbell to Antwaan Randle El put the Redskins up by three. The Jets eventually got the ball back late in the game, and Clemens led the offense on a 15-play drive ending with a Mike Nugent 30-yard field goal with ten seconds left to force overtime.

The Jets won the coin toss to start the extra frame and received the ball first. They began with a 39-yard pass from Clemens to Cotchery, but the drive quickly stalled and the Jets were forced to punt. Campbell and Portis led the Redskins downfield into the field goal range of Suisham, who hit his fifth field goal of the day to give the Redskins the win and send the Jets to their sixth straight loss.

==== Scoring summary ====
Scoring summary
Q	Team	Time	Scoring play	Extra point	Score
1	NYJ	14:47	Washington 86-yard kickoff return	Nugent kick	NYJ 7–0
1	WAS	9:54	Suisham 46-yard field goal		NYJ 7–3
1	NYJ	1:58	Nugent 29-yard field goal		NYJ 10–3
2	NYJ	9:21	Kowalewski 1-yard pass from Clemens	Nugent kick	NYJ 17–3
2	WAS	5:28	Suisham 40-yard field goal		NYJ 17–6
2	WAS	0:55	Suisham 22-yard field goal		NYJ 17–9
3	WAS	10:49	Suisham 40-yard field goal		NYJ 17–12
4	WAS	11:06	Portis 1-yard run	Randle El pass from Campbell	WAS 20–17
4	NYJ	0:10	Nugent 30-yard field goal		Tied 20–20
OT	WAS	7:43	Suisham 46-yard field goal		WAS 23–20

=== Week 11: vs. Pittsburgh Steelers ===
Quarter	1	2	3	4	OT	Total
Steelers	0	7	6	3	0	16
Jets	10	3	0	3	3	19

at Giants Stadium, East Rutherford, New Jersey

- Game time: 4:05 p.m. EST
- Game weather: Overcast, 42 °F or 5.6 °C
- Game attendance: 77,659
- Referee: Scott Green
- TV announcers (CBS): Jim Nantz and Phil Simms

==== Game summary ====
The Jets faced a tough matchup in the Pittsburgh Steelers, who possessed the top-ranked defense in the league entering the game. The Jets started the game with a bang, however, executing a flea flicker play as quarterback Kellen Clemens found Laveranues Coles for 57 yards, setting up Chris Baker's one-yard touchdown reception. After the Jets extended their lead to ten points, the Steelers got on the board in the second quarter. Quarterback Ben Roethlisberger found Santonio Holmes on a seven-yard pass for a touchdown, making the score 10–7. Later, following a Roethlisberger interception by Kerry Rhodes, Clemens led the Jets through a two-minute drill down to the Steelers’ one-yard line, but could not get into the end zone, and the Jets settled for a Mike Nugent 19-yard field goal.

The Steelers were able to chip away at the deficit in the second half. Though the Jets defense managed to stall Pittsburgh drives into Jets territory, Jeff Reed hit field goal attempts from 37, 33, and 48 yards to eventually give Pittsburgh a 16–13 lead with less than nine minutes to go. The Jets eventually received the ball at their own 14-yard line with 2:23 left in the game, and for the second game in a row, Clemens marched the team downfield, on a 13-play, 76-yard drive, culminating in a 28-yard field goal attempt for Nugent, which forced overtime. After both teams went three-and-out to start, Leon Washington, who Pittsburgh kickers and punters had avoided kicking to for much of the game, returned a punt 33 yards to the Steelers 27-yard line. This set up Nugent's successful 38-yard field goal, giving the Jets their second win of the season.

The Jets defense had an impressive game; in addition to an interception and a fumble recovery, they were able to pressure Roethlisberger throughout the game, resulting in seven quarterback sacks, after having just nine in the team's first nine games.

==== Scoring summary ====
Scoring summary
Q	Team	Time	Scoring play	Extra point	Score
1	NYJ	12:49	Baker 1-yard pass from Clemens	Nugent kick	NYJ 7–0
1	NYJ	1:31	Nugent 25-yard field goal		NYJ 10–0
2	PIT	9:04	Holmes 7-yard pass from Roethlisberger	Reed kick	NYJ 10–7
2	NYJ	0:00	Nugent 19-yard field goal		NYJ 13–7
3	PIT	8:24	Reed 37-yard field goal		NYJ 13–10
3	PIT	1:34	Reed 33-yard field goal		Tied 13–13
4	PIT	8:41	Reed 48-yard field goal		PIT 16–13
4	NYJ	0:23	Nugent 28-yard field goal		Tied 16–16
OT	NYJ	9:57	Nugent 38-yard field goal		NYJ 19–16

=== Week 12: at Dallas Cowboys ===
Quarter	1	2	3	4	Total
Jets	0	3	0	0	3
Cowboys	7	14	3	10	34

at Texas Stadium, Irving, Texas

- Game time: 4:15 p.m. EST/3:15 p.m. CST
- Game weather: 45 °F or 7.2 °C
- Game attendance: 63,315
- Referee: Bill Carollo
- TV announcers (CBS): Jim Nantz and Phil Simms

==== Game summary ====
Coming off their home victory over the Steelers, the Jets flew to Texas Stadium for a Week 12 Thanksgiving interconference showdown with the Dallas Cowboys. This was their first Thanksgiving Day appearance since 1985.

In the first quarter, New York trailed early as Cowboys RB Marion Barber got a 7-yard touchdown run for the only score of the period. In the second quarter, Dallas increased its lead with QB Tony Romo completing a 25-yard touchdown pass to TE Jason Witten, along with CB Terence Newman returning an interception 50 yards for a touchdown. The Jets managed to score their only points of the game as kicker Mike Nugent managed to get a 40-yard field goal.

In the third quarter, the Cowboys added on to their lead as kicker Nick Folk managed to get a 46-yard field goal for the only score of the period. In the fourth quarter, Dallas pulled away as Folk nailed a 27-yard field goal and Romo completed a 22-yard touchdown pass to WR Terrell Owens.

With the loss, New York fell to 2–9.

==== Scoring summary ====
Scoring summary
Q	Team	Time	Scoring play	Extra point	Score
1	DAL	10:16	Barber 7-yard run	Folk kick	DAL 7–0
2	DAL	12:09	Witten 25-yard pass from Romo	Folk kick	DAL 14–0
2	DAL	6:18	Newman 50-yard interception return	Folk kick	DAL 21–0
2	NYJ	0:39	Nugent 40-yard field goal		DAL 21–3
3	DAL	8:24	Folk 46-yard field goal		DAL 24–3
4	DAL	11:23	Folk 27-yard field goal		DAL 27–3
4	DAL	6:12	Owens 22-yard pass from Romo	Folk kick	DAL 34–3

=== Week 13: at Miami Dolphins ===
Quarter	1	2	3	4	Total
Jets	7	13	3	17	40
Dolphins	3	10	0	0	13

at Dolphin Stadium, Miami Gardens, Florida

- Game time: 1:00 p.m. EST
- Game weather: Sunny, 81 °F or 27.2 °C
- Game attendance: 71,109
- Referee: Mike Carey
- TV announcers (CBS): Gus Johnson and Steve Tasker

==== Game summary ====
Ironically, the Jets were the underdogs against the 0–11 Dolphins, according to Las Vegas bookmakers.

The Jets opened the game by getting on the board with a direct snap touchdown run by Leon Washington. Long field goals by Jay Feely for the Dolphins cut the Jets' lead to one. Immediately after Feely's second field goal, Jets quarterback Kellen Clemens found Justin McCareins on a long pass for 50 yards, but the drive quickly stalled, and New York was forced to settle for Mike Nugent's 29-yard field goal. On the Jets' next possession, Clemens was hit on one of six Dolphins sacks by Will Allen; the ball popped out on the hit and was recovered by Michael Lehan, who returned the fumble 43 yards for a touchdown to give the Dolphins a 13–10 lead. Aided by consecutive Dolphins penalties prior to kickoff, however, the good field position on the Jets' ensuing drive allowed Clemens to find Brad Smith on a 19-yard touchdown reception to put the Jets back on top. A Kerry Rhodes interception on the Dolphins' next possession allowed the Jets to tack on a 40-yard field goal just before halftime.

Turnovers for the Jets' defense allowed New York to take control of the game in the second half. Rookie Dolphins quarterback John Beck’s fumble on a sack in third quarter led to Nugent's 35-yard attempt to increase the Jets' lead to 10. After Beck lost another fumble on the Dolphins’ next series, the Jets drove down to Miami's one-yard line, where Thomas Jones scored his first touchdown in his twelfth game as a Jet. On Miami's next possession, an interception by Drew Coleman gave the Jets another scoring opportunity, which turned out to be Nugent's fourth field goal of the day. Leon Washington's 12-yard touchdown run late in the fourth quarter ended the scoring.

==== Scoring summary ====
Scoring summary
Q	Team	Time	Scoring play	Extra point	Score
1	NYJ	8:58	Washington 18-yard run	Nugent kick	NYJ 7–0
1	MIA	3:15	Feely 53-yard field goal		NYJ 7–3
2	MIA	11:56	Feely 44-yard field goal		NYJ 7–6
2	NYJ	10:07	Nugent 29-yard field goal		NYJ 10–6
2	MIA	6:39	Lehan 43-yard fumble return	Feely kick	MIA 13–10
2	NYJ	2:39	Smith 19-yard pass from Clemens	Nugent kick	NYJ 17–13
2	NYJ	0:10	Nugent 40-yard field goal		NYJ 20–13
3	NYJ	5:54	Nugent 35-yard field goal		NYJ 23–13
4	NYJ	14:21	Jones 1-yard run	Nugent kick	NYJ 30–13
4	NYJ	11:48	Nugent 26-yard field goal		NYJ 33–13
4	NYJ	1:52	Washington 12-yard run	Nugent kick	NYJ 40–13

=== Week 14: vs. Cleveland Browns ===
Quarter	1	2	3	4	Total
Browns	0	7	7	10	24
Jets	0	3	3	12	18

at Giants Stadium, East Rutherford, New Jersey

- Game time: 4:15 p.m. EST
- Game weather: Overcast, 38 °F or 3.3 °C
- Game attendance: 76,822
- Referee: Walt Anderson
- TV announcers (CBS): Dick Enberg and Randy Cross

==== Game summary ====
Coming off their season-sweep over the Dolphins, the Jets went home for a Week 14 intraconference duel with the Cleveland Browns. After a scoreless first quarter, New York trailed in the second quarter as Browns QB Derek Anderson completed a 7-yard touchdown pass to RB Jamal Lewis. The Jets got on the board with kicker Mike Nugent kicking a 35-yard field goal.

In the third quarter, Cleveland responded with Anderson completing a 4-yard touchdown pass to WR Braylon Edwards. The Jets replied with Nugent kicking a 41-yard field goal. In the fourth quarter, the Browns increased their lead with kicker Phil Dawson getting a 49-yard field goal. New York crept closer with QB Kellen Clemens getting a 1-yard touchdown run (with a failed two-point conversion), while Nugent kicked a 38-yard field goal. However, Cleveland sealed the win with Lewis getting a 31-yard touchdown. The Jets ended the game with Nugent nailing a 35-yard field goal.

With the loss, New York fell to 3–10.

==== Scoring summary ====
Scoring summary
Q	Team	Time	Scoring play	Extra point	Score
2	CLE	1:15	Lewis 7-yard pass from Anderson	Dawson kick	CLE 7–0
2	NYJ	0:00	Nugent 35-yard field goal		CLE 7–3
3	CLE	12:32	Edwards 4-yard pass from Anderson	Dawson kick	CLE 14–3
3	NYJ	2:50	Nugent 41-yard field goal		CLE 14–6
4	CLE	12:59	Dawson 49-yard field goal		17–6
4	NYJ	2:59	Clemens 1-yard run	Pass failed	CLE 17–12
4	NYJ	1:43	Nugent 38-yard field goal		CLE 17–15
4	CLE	1:22	Lewis 31-yard run	Dawson kick	CLE 24–15
4	NYJ	0:32	Nugent 35-yard field goal		CLE 24–18

=== Week 15: at New England Patriots ===
Quarter	1	2	3	4	Total
Jets	0	7	0	3	10
Patriots	7	10	0	3	20

at Gillette Stadium, Foxborough, Massachusetts

- Game time: 1:00 p.m. EST
- Game weather: Rain, 36 °F or 2.2 °C
- Game attendance: 68,756
- Referee: Jerome Boger
- TV announcers (CBS): Jim Nantz and Phil Simms

==== Game summary ====
The Jets were heavy underdogs coming into their second game with the undefeated Patriots. The game was largely a defensive struggle, as cold, wet weather affected both teams’ offenses. On the Jets’ second play from scrimmage, Jets quarterback Kellen Clemens was hit as he threw by Richard Seymour, and safety Eugene Wilson grabbed the errant pass for a quick 7–0 lead for New England. Clemens was forced to leave the game after the play with an undisclosed rib injury, and was relieved for the remainder of the game by Chad Pennington. A field goal extended the Patriots lead in the second quarter. The Jets caught a break later in the quarter when Patriots punter Chris Hanson bobbled the snap on a punt, allowing David Bowens time to block the punt for the Jets; Bowens recovered the ball and ran for the touchdown to trim the Patriots lead to three. However, the Patriots followed suit with their own blocked punt toward the end of the half, which set up Laurence Maroney’s one-yard touchdown run.

The Jets had some scoring opportunities go to waste in the second half. An interception of Patriots quarterback Tom Brady in New England territory led to a Chris Baker fumble at the 15-yard line. The teams then traded field goals in the fourth quarter to make the score 20–10. Following the Patriots’ field goal, the Jets began play at the Patriots 31-yard line; Pennington found Justin McCareins in the end zone for an apparent seven-yard touchdown. However, the play was challenged by New England, and it was ruled that McCareins did not have full control of the ball, nullifying the touchdown. After getting pushed back by a penalty, Mike Nugent missed a 35-yard field goal attempt, ending the Jets’ last serious scoring threat.

==== Scoring summary ====
Scoring summary
Q	Team	Time	Scoring play	Extra point	Score
1	NE	9:33	Wilson 5-yard interception return	Gostkowski kick	NE 7–0
2	NE	12:45	Gostkowski 26-yard field goal		NE 10–0
2	NYJ	7:15	Bowens 26-yard blocked punt return	Nugent kick	NE 10–7
2	NE	1:05	Maroney 1-yard run	Gostkowski kick	NE 17–7
4	NYJ	6:13	Nugent 34-yard field goal		NE 17–10
4	NE	3:21	Gostkowski 35-yard field goal		NE 20–10

=== Week 16: at Tennessee Titans ===
Quarter	1	2	3	4	Total
Jets	0	6	0	0	6
Titans	0	7	3	0	10

at LP Field, Nashville, Tennessee

- Game time: 4:15 p.m. EST/3:15 p.m. CST
- Game weather: Sunny, 42 °F or 5.6 °C
- Game attendance: 69,143
- Referee: Terry McAulay
- TV announcers (CBS): Dick Enberg and Randy Cross

==== Game summary ====
Chad Pennington started at quarterback for the Jets, as Kellen Clemens sat out while recovering from the rib injury suffered against the Patriots. The Titans got on the board early in the second quarter with a four-yard touchdown run by Chris Brown. The Jets responded with a nine-yard touchdown pass from Pennington to Jerricho Cotchery, but the Titans blocked the extra point attempt to maintain a one-point lead. Later in the quarter, the Jets were the victims of unfortunate luck. When Mike Nugent converted a 38-yard field goal attempt, the Titans were called for an unsportsmanlike conduct penalty that gave the Jets a first-and-goal at the Tennessee 10-yard line. However, three plays later, Pennington threw an interception to end the Jets’ scoring threat. A Rob Bironas field goal gave the Titans a 10–6 lead in the third quarter, and the Jets were never able to make any significant progress on offense afterward.

==== Scoring summary ====
Scoring summary
Q	Team	Time	Scoring play	Extra point	Score
2	TEN	14:23	Brown 4-yard run	Bironas kick	TEN 7–0
2	NYJ	10:59	Cotchery 9-yard pass from Pennington	Kick blocked	TEN 7–6
3	TEN	6:36	Bironas 46-yard field goal		TEN 10–6

=== Week 17: vs. Kansas City Chiefs ===
Quarter	1	2	3	4	OT	Total
Chiefs	0	3	0	7	0	10
Jets	0	10	0	0	3	13

at Giants Stadium, East Rutherford, New Jersey

- Game time: 4:15 p.m. EST
- Game weather: Overcast, 41 °F or 5 °C
- Game attendance: 76,737
- Referee: Larry Nemmers
- TV announcers (CBS): Ian Eagle and Solomon Wilcots

==== Game summary ====
Trying to end their season on a high note, the Jets went home for a Week 17 duel with the Kansas City Chiefs. After a scoreless first quarter, New York took flight as QB Kellen Clemens completed a 15-yard touchdown to RB Thomas Jones. The Chiefs got on the board with kicker John Carney getting a 40-yard field goal, followed by Jets kicker Mike Nugent getting a 27-yard field goal to end the half.

After a scoreless third quarter, Kansas City tied the game in the fourth quarter with QB Brodie Croyle completing a 26-yard touchdown pass to WR Jeff Webb. In overtime, New York sealed the win with Nugent nailing the game-winning 43-yard field goal.

With the win, the Jets ended the season at 4–12.

==== Scoring summary ====
Scoring summary
Q	Team	Time	Scoring play	Extra point	Score
2	NYJ	13:07	Jones 15-yard pass from Clemens	Nugent kick	NYJ 7–0
2	KC	5:08	Carney 40-yard field goal		NYJ 7–3
2	NYJ	0:13	Nugent 27-yard field goal		NYJ 10–3
4	KC	2:59	Webb 26-yard pass from Croyle	Carney kick	Tied 10–10
OT	NYJ	9:47	Nugent 43-yard field goal		NYJ 13–10
