= Jerricho Cotchery =

American football player and coach (born 1982)

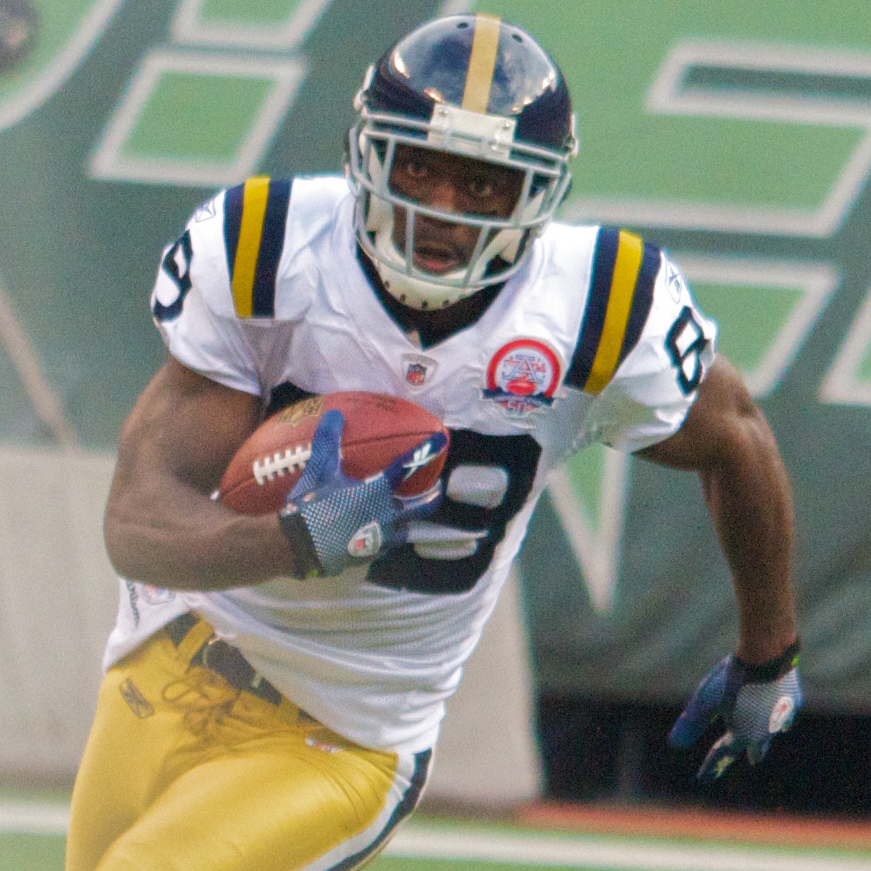
- Cotchery with the New York Jets in 2009

North Greenville Trailblazers
- Title: Assistant head coach & passing game coordinator

Personal information
- Born: June 16, 1982 (age 44); Birmingham, Alabama, U.S.
- Listed height: 6 ft 1 in (1.85 m)
- Listed weight: 205 lb (93 kg)

Career information
- Position: Wide receiver (No. 89, 82)
- High school: John Herbert Phillips Academy (Birmingham)
- College: NC State (2000–2003)
- NFL draft: 2004: 4th round, 108th overall pick

Career history

Playing
- New York Jets (2004–2010); Pittsburgh Steelers (2011–2013); Carolina Panthers (2014–2015)

Coaching
- Carolina Panthers (2017–2019) Assistant wide receivers coach; Limestone (2022–2023) Assistant head coach & wide receivers coach; Limestone (2024) Head coach; North Greenville (2025–present) Assistant head coach & passing game coordinator

Awards and highlights
- 2× First-team All-ACC (2002, 2003)

Career NFL statistics
- Receptions: 524
- Receiving yards: 6,623
- Receiving touchdowns: 34
- Stats at Pro Football Reference

Head coaching record
- Career: 8–3 (.727)

Jerricho Cotchery (born June 16, 1982) is an American football coach and former wide receiver. He is the assistant head coach and passing game coordinator for North Greenville University, a position he has held since 2025. He played in the National Football League (NFL) with the Carolina Panthers, New York Jets, and Pittsburgh Steelers from 2004 to 2015. He played college football for North Carolina State University.

== Early life ==
Cotchery graduated from Phillips High School in Birmingham, Alabama. He played wide receiver and defensive back and was named to the All-State team after his junior and senior years. He lettered in football and basketball in all four years of high school. Cotchery played shooting guard on the basketball team.

== College career ==
Cotchery majored in sports management at North Carolina State University.

Cotchery played 49 games at North Carolina State. In 2002 and 2003, he was selected to the All-Atlantic Coast Conference first-team. Cotchery's 200 career receptions and fifteen games with 100+ receiving yards broke two school records previously held by Torry Holt. Cotchery and Holt are the only two wide receivers in NC State football history to have two seasons of 1,000+ receiving yards. Cotchery also tied the school record for most consecutive games with at least one reception in thirty-nine straight games.

Cotchery's fifteen career games of 100+ receiving yards tied him for second place in Atlantic Coast Conference history. He also ranks fourth in career receptions and career receiving yards. Cotchery and Peter Warrick are the only two receivers in ACC history with 200+ career receptions and 3,000+ career receiving yards. His 3,319 receiving yards are 33rd in NCAA history and his two hundred career receptions tie him for 42nd.

== Professional career ==
Pre-draft measurables
Height	Weight	Arm length	Hand span	40-yard dash	10-yard split	20-yard split	20-yard shuttle	Three-cone drill	Vertical jump	Broad jump
6 ft 0 1/2 in (1.84 m)	212 lb (96 kg)	31 in (0.79 m)	9 1/2 in (0.24 m)	4.58 s	1.59 s	2.67 s	3.91 s	6.93 s	36 in (0.91 m)	10 ft 1 in (3.07 m)
All values from NFL Combine

=== New York Jets ===
==== 2004 season ====
Cotchery was selected by the New York Jets in the fourth round with the 108th overall pick in the 2004 NFL draft. He was the 16th of 33 wide receivers taken in the draft, but over his career would have more success than expected from his relatively late selection, second in receiving yards only to Larry Fitzgerald (including 16 tight ends).

In 2004, Cotchery caught six passes for 60 yards in twelve games (with no starts) as the team's fifth receiver. As a kick returner, he had thirteen returns for 362 yards, 27.8 yard average, and one touchdown.

==== 2005 season ====
Cotchery entered the 2005 season as the New York Jets fourth string wide receiver. An injury to Wayne Chrebet caused him to be moved up the depth chart to third string. Cotchery played in sixteen games (with one start), catching nineteen passes for 251 yards with no touchdowns. He returned four kicks for 105 yards, a 26.3 yard average, and twenty-three punts for 182 yards, a 7.9 yard average.

==== 2006 season ====
New Jets head coach Eric Mangini called Cotchery the "most outstanding player in our offseason program" and promoted him to second starting wide receiver opposite Laveranues Coles. Cotchery started for the Jets in Week 1 against the Tennessee Titans. He had six catches for 65 yards, and caught his first NFL touchdown from quarterback Chad Pennington.

The next week, Cotchery had six catches for 121 yards and a touchdown, which included a career-long 71-yard catch in a 24–17 loss to the New England Patriots. In Week 4, Cotchery had another touchdown catch in a 31–28 loss to the Indianapolis Colts. In Week 10, the Jets beat the Patriots at Gillette Stadium 17–14. Cotchery had six catches for 70 yards and a touchdown moving the Jets to only one game behind the Patriots for first place in the AFC East. In Week 12, Cotchery had seven catches for 110 yards in the Jets' 26–11 win over the Houston Texans. The following week Cotchery had nine catches for 99 yards and a touchdown against the Green Bay Packers at Lambeau field as the Jets won 38–10.

The Jets' final record was 10–6. They were 7–6 after Week 14 but won their last three games to make the playoffs as a wildcard team. Cotchery ended the regular season with eighty-two catches (tied for 16th in the NFL) and 961 yards (twenty-second). Cotchery had 100 receiving yards and a touchdown in the Jets' Wild Card Round loss to the New England Patriots.

==== 2007 season ====
Cotchery signed a multi-year extension with the Jets on March 1, 2007. The Jets opened the 2007 season against the New England Patriots, the team that had eliminated them from the playoffs the previous year. Cotchery had six catches for 57 yards in a 38–14 Jets loss. After the game, a closer look at video replays found that the Patriots had been taping the New York Jets' defensive coaches' signals. Later it was called Spygate. In Week 2 against the Baltimore Ravens, Cotchery had seven catches and set a new career high of 165 receiving yards in a 17–13 loss. On September 30, 2007, Cotchery had eight catches for 107 yards as the Jets lost to the Buffalo Bills. Cotechery scored his first touchdown of the season in Week 7 when the Jets were playing the Cincinnati Bengals He had six catches for 60 yards in the game.

Halfway through the season, Cotchery's team stood at 1–7 and faced a quarterback controversy between Chad Pennington and Kellen Clemens. In Week 11, the Jets defeated the Pittsburgh Steelers, who were considered a playoff contender at the time. It was the biggest win of the season for the Jets and brought their record to 2–8. Cotchery, however, only contributed one catch for 5 yards. On Monday, November 26, 2007, Cotchery injured his right index finger during practice. The finger required surgery, but Cotchery only missed one game.

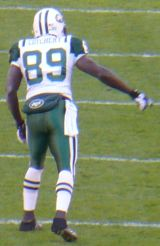
Cotchery lines up for the play.

Cotchery had six catches for 119 yards in his first game back after surgery as the Jets lost to the Cleveland Browns 24–18. In a Week 16 loss to the Tennessee Titans, Cotchery had eight catches for 152 yards with a touchdown, which was the only score for the Jets that day. Cotchery had eight receptions for 76 yards in the final game of the season, which resulted in an overtime win against the Kansas City Chiefs. Although Cotchery had enjoyed his best season yet, the Jets' finished with a mediocre record of 4–12, earning them last place in the AFC East. Cotchery finished the season with team highs in: receptions (82), yards (1,130), receiving touchdowns (2) and had yards-per-catch average (13.8). Former Jets head coach Herm Edwards said he regretted not playing Cotchery more while he was coaching the Jets.

==== 2008 season ====
In August 2008, the Jets traded for former Packers quarterback Brett Favre. In the first game of the season against the Miami Dolphins, Favre threw his first touchdown as a Jet to Cotchery, who finished the day with three receptions for 80 yards and a touchdown as the Jets won 20–14. In a Week 4 win over the Arizona Cardinals, Favre threw for six touchdowns, including two to Cotchery, who had four catches for 67 yards. In Week 11, Cotchery caught five passes for 87 yards in a win over division rivals the New England Patriots moving the Jets past the Patriots into first place in the AFC East. The following week, the Jets beat the undefeated Tennessee Titans 10–0, with Cotchery catching six passes and improving the Jets record to 8–3. In Week 15, Cotchery had a touchdown catch in a win against the Buffalo Bills snapping the Jets' two-game losing streak. The Jets were 8–3 and in first place in the AFC East. The Jets lost four out of their next five games and finished 9–7, missing the playoffs for the second straight year. Cotchery ended the season with seventy-one receptions for 858 yards, an average of 12.1 yards per catch average and five touchdowns. Cotchery played and started in all sixteen games.

==== 2009 season ====
After the departure of Laveranues Coles to the Cincinnati Bengals, Cotchery became the Jets' primary receiver. In Week 1, Cotchery had six catches for 90 yards in the Jets win over the Houston Texans. In Week 3, Cotchery had eight receptions for 108 yards, as well as his first touchdown reception of the season in a win over the Tennessee Titans. Cotchery finished 2009 with fifty-seven catches for 821 yards. The Jets finished the regular season with a 9–7 record and made the playoffs as a wildcard. The Jets defeated the Cincinnati Bengals in the wildcard round, with Cotchery catching six passes for 67 yards. The following week, the Jets beat the San Diego Chargers to reach the AFC Championship game against the Indianapolis Colts, where the Jets lost 30–17, with Cotchery catching five passes for 100 yards.

==== 2010 season ====
On April 11, 2010, the New York Jets traded for wide receiver Santonio Holmes and in exchange gave up a fifth round pick in the 2010 NFL draft. Cotchery was positioned as third-choice wide receiver, behind Holmes and Braylon Edwards. On November 14, 2010, he had three catches for 43 yards and a touchdown in a 26–20 overtime win over the Cleveland Browns. Cotchery hurt his groin that week and missed the following two games. Cotchery finished the 2010 season with forty-one catches for 433 yards with two touchdowns while playing in 14 games. He started five games, the lowest number since the 2005 season. He was released by the Jets on August 4, 2011.

=== Pittsburgh Steelers ===
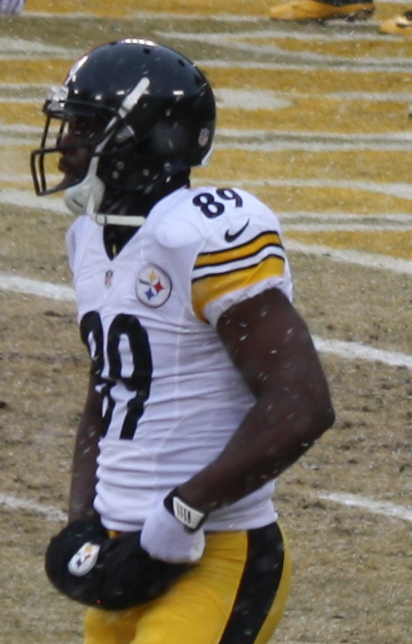
Cotchery in 2013

Cotchery agreed to a one-year deal with the Pittsburgh Steelers on August 11, 2011, after he had met with the team at training camp the previous week.

In the 2011 season, Cotchery recorded 16 receptions for 237 receiving yards and two receiving touchdowns in 13 games.

On April 12, 2012, he was reported to have re-signed with the Steelers for two more years, agreeing to a deal worth around $3 million. In the 2012 season, Cotchery had 17 receptions for 205 receiving yards in 14 games and two starts.

In the 2013 season, Cotchery had 46 receptions for 602 receiving yards and ten receiving touchdowns in 16 games and six starts.

=== Carolina Panthers ===
==== 2014 season ====
On March 20, 2014, Cotchery agreed to a two-year deal with the Carolina Panthers. He missed the week three game against the Pittsburgh Steelers because of a hamstring injury suffered during a practice on September 18. He finished the 2014 season with 48 receptions for 580 receiving yards and one receiving touchdown in 15 games and 13 starts.

==== 2015 season ====
In the 2015 season, Cotchery played in 14 games and started three. He recorded 39 receptions for 485 receiving yards and three receiving touchdowns.

The Carolina Panthers played in Super Bowl 50, which was Cotchery's first appearance in the Super Bowl. In the game, the Panthers fell to the Denver Broncos by a score of 24–10. In the loss, Cotchery caught two passes for 17 yards but was credited with three drops, after having not dropped a pass the entire season. His first drop was a subject of controversy. After initially having the ball bounce off his hands, Cotchery managed to grab the ball on the way to the ground, but the pass was ruled incomplete as it seemed that the ball touched the ground as he was trying to get control of it. The play was challenged, and senior official Mike Carey believed it would be an easy overturn. The ruling of an incomplete pass stood. Two plays later, the Panthers would fumble the ball and the Broncos would recover it in the endzone for a touchdown.

Cotchery's next drop came on the very next drive, on a third down play, which forced a Carolina punt on what had been a promising drive that had gotten out to midfield. His third was on a pass that was either going to be a touchdown or would set up Carolina inside the five yard line, the drive ultimately ending in a missed field goal.

At the end of the 2015 season, Cotchery did not sign with another NFL team.

== Coaching career ==
In 2017, Cotchery joined the Carolina Panthers coaching staff as the assistant wide receivers coach. He was not retained by Matt Rhule in 2020.

In 2022, Cotchery was hired as an assistant head coach and wide receivers coach for Limestone University.

In 2024, Cotchery was named the head coach for Limestone University after former head coach Mike Furrey stepped down and was named the wide receivers coach at the University of South Carolina. It would be his only season as head coach as the university would shut down operations in May 2025.

After the closure of Limestone University, Cotchery was hired as an assistant head coach and passing game coordinator for North Greenville University.

== Career statistics ==
Legend
**Bold**	Career high

=== Playing career ===
==== NFL ====
Year	Team	Games		Receiving					Rushing				
Year	Team	GP	GS	Rec	Yds	Avg	Lng	TD	Att	Yds	Avg	Lng	TD
2004	NYJ	12	0	6	60	10.0	18	0	0	0	0.0	0	0
2005	NYJ	16	1	19	251	13.2	45	0	1	4	4.0	4	0
2006	NYJ	16	16	**82**	961	11.7	**71**	6	**5**	25	5.0	10	0
2007	NYJ	15	15	**82**	**1,130**	13.8	50	2	**5**	**38**	7.6	**16**	0
2008	NYJ	16	16	71	858	12.1	56	5	2	8	4.0	8	0
2009	NYJ	14	12	57	821	14.4	53	3	2	7	3.5	6	**1**
2010	NYJ	14	5	41	433	10.6	49	2	4	−3	−0.8	4	0
2011	PIT	13	0	16	237	**14.8**	36	2	1	3	3.0	3	0
2012	PIT	14	2	17	205	12.1	24	0	0	0	0.0	0	0
2013	PIT	16	6	46	602	13.1	36	**10**	1	−5	−5.0	−5	0
2014	CAR	15	13	48	580	12.1	47	1	0	0	0.0	0	0
2015	CAR	14	3	39	485	12.4	59	3	1	16	**16.0**	**16**	0
Career		175	89	524	6,623	12.6	71	34	22	93	4.2	16	1

==== College ====
Season	GP	Receiving				Rushing				Scrimmage				Punt Ret.				Kickoff Ret.			
Season	GP	Rec	Yds	Avg	TD	Att	Yds	Avg	TD	Plays	Yds	Avg	TD	Ret	Yds	Avg	TD	Ret	Yds	Avg	TD
2000	10	6	75	12.5	0	1	5	5.0	0	7	80	11.4	0	1	17	**17.0**	0	0	0	0.0	0
2001	11	41	483	11.8	4	6	**57**	**9.5**	**1**	47	540	11.5	5	10	100	10.0	0	0	0	0.0	0
2002	14	67	1,192	**17.8**	7	4	8	2.0	0	71	1,200	**16.9**	7	**20**	**109**	5.5	0	**2**	**91**	**45.5**	**1**
2003	13	**86**	**1,369**	15.9	**10**	**7**	32	4.6	0	**93**	**1,401**	15.1	**10**	0	0	0.0	0	0	0	0.0	0
Career	48	200	3,119	15.6	21	18	102	5.7	1	218	3,221	14.8	22	31	226	7.3	0	2	91	45.5	1

=== Head coaching record ===
Year	Team	Overall	Conference	Standing	Bowl/playoffs
**Limestone Saints** (South Atlantic Conference) (2024)
2024	Limestone	8–3	6–2	T–2nd (Piedmont)	
Limestone:		8–3	6–2		
Total:		8–3			

== Career highlights ==
- 2× First-team All-ACC (2002, 2003)

Jets franchise records

- Receptions: playoffs (30)
- Yds/Rec: playoff game (25 on 2007-01-07 @NWE, tied with two others)
- Total Return Yds: playoffs (294)
- 100+ yard receiving games: playoffs (2, tied with Wesley Walker)

== Personal life ==
Cotchery grew up in the Norwood neighborhood of Birmingham, Alabama. His father, Bob, ran a lawn care service, and his mother worked in a nursing home. He was the second youngest of thirteen children in a blended family with siblings separated in age by as much as twenty-five years. He played basketball and football at Phillips High School. On May 30, 1998, he was in a severe car accident and still has scars on his wrists and hands. As of 2008, shards of glass continued to work their way up and out of his skin. Cotchery was born with six fingers on his left hand; one was subsequently removed.

Cotchery married his wife, Mercedes, a month after being selected by the Jets in 2004. Cotchery and Mercedes have five children; three of which were adopted.
