= Wes Welker =

American football player and coach (born 1981)

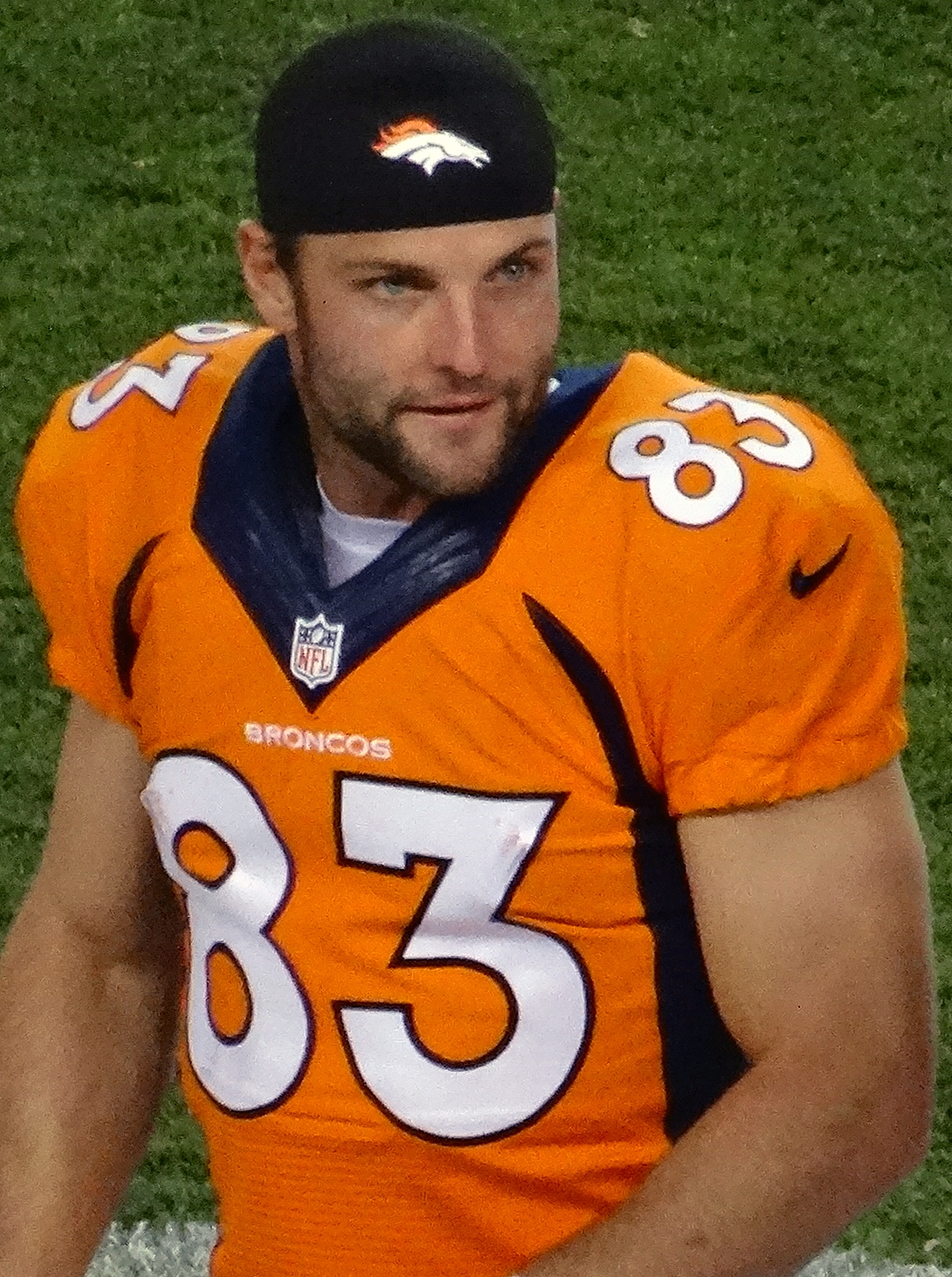
- Welker with the Denver Broncos in 2013

Washington Commanders
- Title: Tight ends coach

Personal information
- Born: May 1, 1981 (age 45); Oklahoma City, Oklahoma, U.S.
- Listed height: 5 ft 9 in (1.75 m)
- Listed weight: 185 lb (84 kg)

Career information
- Position: Wide receiver (No. 83, 19)
- High school: Heritage Hall (Oklahoma City)
- College: Texas Tech (2000–2003)
- NFL draft: 2004: undrafted

Career history

Playing
- San Diego Chargers (2004); Miami Dolphins (2004–2006); New England Patriots (2007–2012); Denver Broncos (2013–2014); St. Louis Rams (2015)

Coaching
- Houston Texans (2017–2018) Offensive & special teams assistant; San Francisco 49ers (2019–2021) Wide receivers coach; Miami Dolphins (2022–2024) Wide receivers coach; Washington Commanders (2025–present); Personnel analyst (2025); Tight ends coach (2026–present)

Awards and highlights
- New England Patriots All-Dynasty Team; 2× First-Team All-Pro (2009, 2011); 2× Second-Team All-Pro (2007, 2008); 5× Pro Bowl (2008–2012); 3× NFL receptions leader (2007, 2009, 2011); PFWA All-Rookie Team (2004); First-team All-Big 12 (2003); Second-team All-Big 12 (2002); Texas Tech Ring of Honor (2024); NFL record: Longest receiving touchdown: 99 yards (tied)

Career NFL statistics
- Receptions: 903
- Receiving yards: 9,924
- Receiving touchdowns: 50
- Return yards: 6,722
- Return touchdowns: 1
- Stats at Pro Football Reference

Wesley Carter Welker (born May 1, 1981) is an American professional football coach and former wide receiver who is the tight ends coach for the Washington Commanders of the National Football League (NFL). He played in the NFL for 12 seasons, most notably with the New England Patriots, and holds the NFL record for most receptions by an undrafted player. Welker played college football for the Texas Tech Red Raiders, winning the Mosi Tatupu Award and receiving first-team All-Big 12 honors as a senior.

Joining the NFL in 2004, Welker played his first three seasons with the Dolphins and set the franchise record for kick return yardage. Welker was traded to the Patriots in 2007, where he earned Pro Bowl selections in five of his six seasons, led the league in receptions three times, set the franchise record for receptions, and became one of 13 players to score a 99-yard touchdown. He played his next two seasons with the Denver Broncos and was a member of the 2013 team that set the NFL record for points scored in a season. He played for the St. Louis Rams in 2015 before retiring. Welker has served as an offensive assistant and coach since 2017 for several teams. For his accomplishments in New England, he was named to the Patriots' All-2000s, All-2010s, and All-Dynasty Teams.

== Early life ==
Welker started his football career at Heritage Hall High School in Oklahoma City, his hometown. In his junior year, he helped lead the Chargers to the 2A State Football championship over Tishomingo High School. In that game, Welker had three touchdowns, over 200 all-purpose yards, a 47-yard field goal, and an interception. In his high school football career, he rushed for 3,235 yards and 53 rushing touchdowns to go along with recording 174 receptions for 2,551 receiving yards and 27 receiving touchdowns. On defense, he recorded 22 interceptions, three pick-sixes, 581 tackles, and nine fumble recoveries. He handled some kicking duties and recorded 165 extra points made and 35 field goals converted. As a punt returner, he scored seven touchdowns. Also, in 1999, he was named The Daily Oklahoman All-State Player of the Year, Oklahoma Gatorade Player of the year, as well as Oklahoma State Player of the Year by USA Today.

Welker played in the 2000 Oil Bowl, scoring a 40-yard field goal for the Oklahoma team in the 11–9 loss. Out of high school, Welker was not heavily recruited, as he was considered to be too small to play at the college level. However, after a recruit at Texas Tech backed out of his scholarship, it was offered to Welker. Said Welker of the experience:

"I was thinking I'd get a scholarship somewhere. When it didn't happen when it was supposed to, on signing day, I was pretty hurt by it. … In the end, I don't think I could've picked a better school than Texas Tech."

Besides football Welker also ran track his freshman and sophomore years before moving on to soccer in his junior year. He scored 15 goals in four games during the 1999 season before suffering a season-ending injury. Welker rejoined the team late in his senior year and helped lead the team to a 10-4-1 record. A two-time MVP, he also helped Heritage Hall qualify for the state tournament for the first time. Although his he only played 9 games in two seasons, he had nine assists. Which ranks him 5th in career goals and career points, and he honored by selection to the 1999 and 2000 All-District teams as well as the 2000 All-State team. He was inducted into the heritage Hall athletics Hall of Fame in 2000.

== College career ==
While attending Texas Tech University, Welker played for the school's Red Raiders football team. His last-minute signing proved to be very beneficial for the Red Raider football team. Based on a highlight reel from high school, Welker earned the nickname "The Natural", given to him by his recruiter, and then running backs coach at Texas Tech, Art Briles, before his freshman year for his versatility and big-game performances.

=== 2000 season ===
Welker made his collegiate debut in the 2000 season opener against Utah State. He recorded an eight-yard punt return in the 38–16 victory. Two weeks later, in a 26–0 victory over Louisiana–Lafayette, he recorded a 63-yard punt return for a touchdown. He had four total punt returns on the day for 102 net yards for a 25.5 average On October 7, against Baylor, he recorded his first collegiate reception on a 37-yard catch in the 28–0 victory. On October 28, in a 45–39 victory over Kansas, he had five receptions for 72 yards to go along with a 42-yard rushing touchdown. In addition, he recorded a punt return that went 66 yards for a touchdown. As a freshman, he had 26 receptions for 334 yards. In addition, he recorded 17 kick returns for 308 net yards for a 18.0 average and 28 punt returns for 353 net yards for a 12.6 average and two punt return touchdowns.

=== 2001 season ===
In the Red Raiders' 2001 season opener, a 42–30 victory over New Mexico, Welker had four receptions for 40 receiving yards and his first collegiate receiving touchdown on a pass by quarterback Kliff Kingsbury. On October 13, in a 38–19 victory over Kansas State, he had six receptions for 102 yards and two touchdowns. In the following game, a 41–31 loss at Nebraska, he had four receptions for 47 yards to go along with an 85-yard kick return for a touchdown. On November 3, he had 11 catches for 64 yards in the 12–0 victory over Texas A&M. As a sophomore, he had 50 receptions for 582 yards and five touchdowns.

=== 2002 season ===
Welker started the 2002 season off with a strong individual performance of five receptions for 112 yards and two touchdowns in the 45–21 loss to Ohio State. In the next game, he turned in another great effort with nine receptions for 153 yards in the 24–14 victory over SMU. The following week against Ole Miss, he had four receptions for 40 yards to go along with a 71-yard punt return for a touchdown in the 42–28 victory. On October 5, against Texas A&M, he had 10 receptions for 120 yards and a touchdown to go along with an 88-yard punt return for a touchdown in the 48–47 shootout victory. On November 16, against Texas, he had 14 receptions for 169 yards and two touchdowns in the 42–38 victory. In the 2002 Tangerine Bowl, he had three receptions for 20 yards and a touchdown to go along with a 59-yard punt return for a touchdown in the 55–15 victory over Clemson. As a junior, he had 86 receptions for 1,054 yards and seven receiving touchdowns to go along with 57 punt returns for 752 net yards and three punt returns for touchdowns. In the Big 12 conference, his total receptions finished third, receiving yards finished sixth, and receiving touchdowns finished seventh. He led the conference and finished second in the NCAA with his total punt return yardage.

=== 2003 season ===
In the first three games of the 2003 season, Welker totaled 16 receptions for 183 yards and recorded a punt return touchdown in a 58–10 victory over SMU in that stretch. In his fourth game, against Ole Miss, he had 10 receptions for 131 yards and a touchdown in the 49–45 victory. On October 4, against Texas A&M, he had six receptions for 114 yards and two touchdowns in the 59–28 victory. On October 18, against Oklahoma State, he had 10 receptions for 129 yards and two touchdowns in the 51–49 loss. . On November 1, against Colorado, he had five receptions for 91 yards and a receiving touchdown to go along with a 58-yard punt return for a touchdown in the 26–21 victory. In his final collegiate game, in the 2003 Houston Bowl against Navy, he had seven receptions for 107 yards in the 38–14 victory. As a senior, he had 97 receptions for 1,099 yards and nine touchdowns to go along with a four-yard rushing touchdown.

Over his four-year career, he had 259 receptions for 3,019 yards and 21 touchdowns, 341 kick return yards, and 79 rushes for 456 yards and two touchdowns. He set the NCAA record for punt return yards with 1,761, and returned eight punts for touchdowns in his career, which currently places him a second place tie with Antonio Perkins for the NCAA record, and behind Dante Pettis, who finished with nine.

In 2003, Welker won the Mosi Tatupu Award, given annually to the best special teams player in college football. Welker was also named to the Sports Illustrated All-Decade Team as a punt returner.

After his senior season at Texas Tech, Welker was not invited to the NFL Scouting Combine.

== Professional career ==
Pre-draft measurables
Height	Weight	Arm length	Hand span	40-yard dash	10-yard split	20-yard split	20-yard shuttle	Three-cone drill	Vertical jump	Broad jump
5 ft 8 3/4 in (1.75 m)	195 lb (88 kg)	31 3/8 in (0.80 m)	9 in (0.23 m)	4.65 s	1.60 s	2.67 s	4.01 s	7.09 s	30.0 in (0.76 m)	9 ft 5 in (2.87 m)
All values from Pro Day

=== San Diego Chargers ===
Welker, who went undrafted during the 2004 NFL draft, signed as an undrafted free agent with the San Diego Chargers. Welker made the Chargers out of training camp, appearing in four preseason games and the regular season opener against the Houston Texans. After returning four kickoffs for 102 yards in his debut, Welker was released when the Chargers claimed safety Clinton Hart off waivers. Head coach Marty Schottenheimer later acknowledged that in terms of roster cuts, releasing Welker was the "biggest mistake [he] ever made".

=== Miami Dolphins ===
==== 2004 season ====
After the Chargers released Welker, he passed through waivers. Although the Chargers offered him a slot on their practice squad, Welker chose to sign with the Miami Dolphins, where he was mostly used on special teams. Playing against the New England Patriots on October 10, 2004, Welker became the second player in NFL history to return a kickoff and a punt, kick an extra point and a field goal, and make a tackle in a single game. For this performance, Welker earned AFC Special Teams Player of the Week. On December 20, Welker had a 71-yard punt return to set up Miami's first touchdown in a 29–28 victory over the Patriots. In the regular season finale against the Baltimore Ravens, he had a 95-yard return touchdown in the 30–23 loss. Overall, he finished the 2004 season with 61 kickoff returns for 1,415 net yards (23.20 average) and a kickoff return touchdown to go along with 43 punt returns for 464 net yards (10.79 average).

==== 2005 season ====
During training camp at the beginning of the 2005 season, Welker was promoted to the third wide receiver spot after Chris Chambers and Marty Booker. He finished the 2005 season with 29 receptions for 434 yards. In addition, he had 43 punt returns for 390 yards, a 9.1-yard average (11th in the NFL), and 61 kick returns for 1,379 yards, a 22.6-yard average (20th in the NFL).

==== 2006 season ====
After rumors that he would be cut during the preseason, Welker started off being a bright spot in the struggling Dolphins' offense. Through five games, he netted a team-high 29 catches and team-high 299 yards. On October 8, 2006, he was a reliable target for backup quarterback Joey Harrington, recording a then career-high nine catches for 77 yards in a 20–10 loss to the New England Patriots. For the season, he had a team-best 67 receptions for 687 yards and one touchdown. He returned 48 kickoffs for 1,048 yards (22.2 average) and 41 punts for 378 yards (9.2 average).

=== New England Patriots ===
==== 2007 season ====
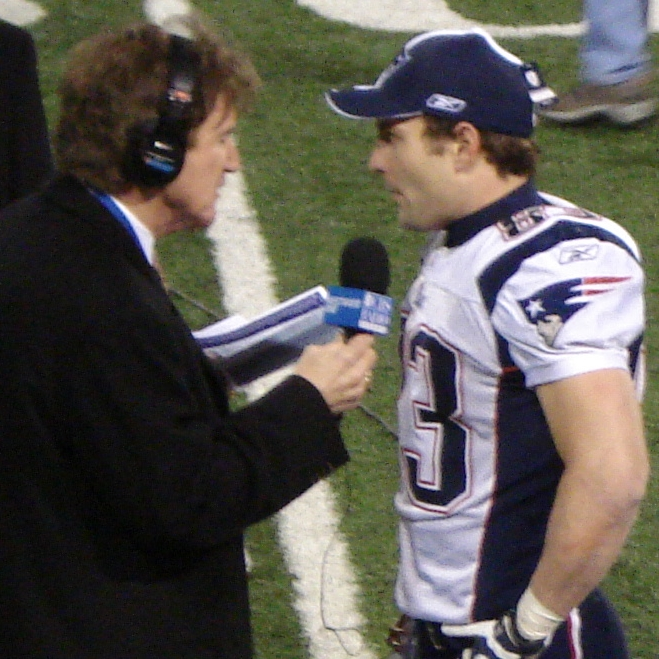
Welker following the final game of the undefeated 2007 Patriots regular season

On March 1, 2007, the Dolphins offered Welker, a restricted free agent, a second-round tender of $1.35 million for a one-year contract. News reports indicated the New England Patriots, who were interested in Welker, had originally considered signing him to an offer sheet. Miami would have had seven days to match the offer. According to The Boston Globe, that sheet would have contained a poison pill provision that would have made the offer difficult for the Dolphins to match. Ultimately, however, the Patriots decided not to use such an offer and traded their 2007 second-round draft pick and a seventh-round draft pick to the Dolphins for Welker.

Welker's first season as a Patriot eclipsed his 2006 season as a Dolphin; he bettered his totals for receptions, touchdowns, and yardage in his first ten games. In Week 1, a 38–14 victory over the New York Jets, he caught the first of the Patriots' 75 touchdowns, equaling the one receiving touchdown he had scored in his three seasons with the Dolphins. He set career highs for single-game yardage three times in 2007: in the Patriots' Week 6 48–27 win over the Dallas Cowboys, Welker had 11 catches for 124 yards and two touchdowns (all career bests); the next week, a 49–28 victory over the Miami Dolphins, he had nine catches for 138 yards and two more touchdowns (the most receiving yards of any NFL player that week); and in Week 12, a 31–28 victory over the Philadelphia Eagles, he had 13 receptions for 149 yards. In Week 15, a 20–10 victory over the New York Jets, Welker reached 1,000 receiving yards for the first time in his career; in Week 16, against the Miami Dolphins, he recorded his 101st reception of the season, tying the Patriots franchise record set by Troy Brown in 2001. In Week 17, in a game against the New York Giants, he caught 11 more passes, setting the Patriots franchise record for catches with 112, and tying Bengals receiver T. J. Houshmandzadeh for most receptions in the 2007 NFL season. He also set an NFL record for most catches in a first season with a new team. Welker, who finished the season with 1,175 yards and eight touchdowns, received one vote for NFL Offensive Player of the Year, an award won by his quarterback, Tom Brady, and was voted to his first AP All-Pro Team (second team).

In his first two postseason games, the Divisional Round against the Jacksonville Jaguars and the AFC Championship against the San Diego Chargers, Welker had 16 receptions for 110 yards and two touchdowns. He tied the then-Super Bowl record of 11 receptions in a single game in the Patriots' 17–14 loss to the New York Giants in Super Bowl XLII.

==== 2008 season ====
Despite the ACL injury to quarterback Tom Brady in Week 1 against the Kansas City Chiefs, Welker continued to amass receptions at the same pace through the first half of the season with Matt Cassel at quarterback: through eight games, he had 56 receptions, but only one touchdown reception. He had six or more receptions in each of the Patriots' first 11 games, breaking Jimmy Smith's mark of eight games at the start of the Jacksonville Jaguars' 2001 season.

Welker had what was, at the time, the longest pass play of his NFL career in the Patriots' 48–28 victory over the Miami Dolphins in Week 12: on 2nd-and-8 from their own 15, Welker caught a five-yard pass from Matt Cassel, then eluded a pair of defenders, tip-toeing and running down the left sideline to the Miami 21, for a total of 64 yards, 59 yards after the catch. Welker broke the 1,000-yard mark for the second consecutive season in Week 14 against the Seattle Seahawks, catching 12 passes for 134 yards, and catching a pass on the Patriots' two-point conversion. He finished the season with a league-leading 96 receptions, for 1,002 yards (ninth in the NFL, third in the AFC). Against the Oakland Raiders one week later, Welker became the first player in Patriots history, and the eighth in NFL history, to have back-to-back 100-reception seasons; the previous player to do it was his teammate Randy Moss, while he was a Viking, in 2002 and 2003, and Brandon Marshall accomplished the feat in the same seasons as Welker.

Welker was fined $10,000 by the NFL for celebrating a December 21 touchdown against the Arizona Cardinals in Week 16 by lying down in the snow by the endzone and using his body to make a snow angel, violating a recent NFL rule change making going to ground after a touchdown unsportsmanlike conduct.

Welker was selected to attend the 2009 Pro Bowl as a reserve, and was again named to the AP All-Pro Second Team.

==== 2009 season ====
Welker started off the 2009 season with 12 receptions for 93 receiving yards in a 25–24 victory over the Buffalo Bills. He was sidelined in Weeks 2 and 3, against the New York Jets and Atlanta Falcons, respectively, with a knee injury; rookie wide receiver Julian Edelman took his place in the lineup. In the Week 6 game against the Tennessee Titans on October 18, Welker caught 10 passes for 150 yards, a new career high (at the time), and two touchdowns. The second of Welker's touchdowns was Tom Brady's NFL record fifth touchdown in a single quarter. Welker set career marks again in the Patriots' Week 11 rematch against the Jets: targeted 17 times, he caught 15 passes — at the time the highest single-game total for any player in the NFL in 2009 — for 192 yards, and added 11 rushing yards on a reverse. In Week 13 against the Dolphins, Welker recorded 167 receiving yards to eclipse the 1,000-yard mark for the third straight season. In the 22–21 loss to the Dolphins, Welker tallied 167 yards on 10 catches, including a season long 58-yard reception over the middle. In the Patriots' Week 14 win at home against the Carolina Panthers, Welker caught 10 passes (out of 19 total completions for Brady) for 105 yards. This gave him 105 receptions in just 11 games and Welker led the NFL in receptions at that point. The performance also made Welker the fourth receiver in NFL history (after Jerry Rice, Herman Moore, and Marvin Harrison, and tied with Brandon Marshall who did it in the same seasons as Welker) to catch 100 passes in three consecutive seasons. In Week 16, Welker caught 13 passes, giving him seven games with double-digit receptions. This gave him the record for most double digit reception games in a single season, passing Marvin Harrison. He accomplished this despite missing two games earlier in the season. In a Week 17 loss to the Houston Texans, Welker suffered a knee injury after getting hit by Bernard Pollard in the first quarter while running upfield to make his only reception of the game. He suffered a torn MCL and ACL in his left knee and was unable to participate in the Patriots' Wild Card Round loss to the Baltimore Ravens. He was placed on injured reserve on January 6, 2010.

Welker finished the season with a league-high 123 receptions, the second-highest total in NFL history, and finished second in yardage, behind Houston's Andre Johnson. He was also selected to represent the AFC in the Pro Bowl for the second consecutive year, and, for the first time in his career, was named to the All-Pro First Team. Because of the knee injury he could not play in the Pro Bowl, and was replaced on the Pro Bowl roster by teammate Randy Moss.

==== 2010 season ====
Welker rehabilitated his knee during the 2010 offseason with the goal of being ready for the 2010 season opener, while many analysts expected that he would start the season on the Physically Unable to Perform list, and some even speculated that he would miss the entire 2010 season.

Nonetheless, Welker played in the Patriots' Week 1 38–24 victory against the Cincinnati Bengals, and led all Patriots receivers with eight catches for 64 yards and two touchdowns; those catches included Brady's first pass attempt of the season and his first touchdown pass. In the Patriots' Week 9 34–14 loss to the Cleveland Browns, after an injury to kicker Stephen Gostkowski, Welker was asked to kick an extra point for the first time since he did so in 2004 against the Patriots; he converted the attempt. Welker had two touchdown catches in the Patriots' 45–24 win over the Detroit Lions on Thanksgiving. He recorded a season-high in receiving yards with 115 on eight receptions in a Week 14 36–7 victory over the Chicago Bears. He finished the 2010 season with 86 receptions for 848 yards and seven touchdowns in 15 games with 11 starts. He was named to the 2011 Pro Bowl as an injury replacement to Houston Texans wide receiver Andre Johnson.

In the playoff loss to the New York Jets in the Divisional Round, Welker was benched for the teams' first offensive series for making a series of foot references in a press conference that took shots at a foot fetish of Jets' coach Rex Ryan. He had seven receptions for 57 yards in the 28–21 loss. He was voted the Patriots Ed Block Courage Award winner by his teammates, and was ranked 50th by his fellow players on the NFL Top 100 Players of 2011 players' list.

==== 2011 season ====
In the Patriots' 38–24 Week 1 win over the Miami Dolphins, Welker caught a 99-yard pass from Tom Brady. Tying the NFL record for longest play from scrimmage, it was, at the time, the 12th such play in NFL history, and the first for the Patriots. The play accounted for the majority of Welker's yards in an eight-catch effort for 160 receiving yards and two receiving touchdowns.

In Week 3, in the Patriots' 34–31 loss to the Buffalo Bills, Welker recorded career-highs with 16 receptions for 217 yards and two touchdowns. In so doing, he tied wide receiver Troy Brown's franchise record of 16 receptions in a single game and broke Terry Glenn's franchise record of 214 yards, set in 1999. The game also marked Welker's 64th consecutive regular season game with a reception (i.e., in every game he had played thus far as a Patriot), breaking tight end Ben Coates's record of 63 games (set 1992 to 1996). It was Welker's second game with at least 15 receptions, a feat previously done only by Brandon Marshall with the Denver Broncos.

In Week 5, in the Patriots' win over the New York Jets, Welker caught five passes for 124 yards, including a 73-yard catch and run in which Welker beat Eric Smith and was chased down by Darrelle Revis at the eight-yard line.

In Week 14, against the Washington Redskins, Welker recorded his 100th reception of the season, giving him four seasons with at least 100 receptions, tying the NFL record shared by Marvin Harrison and Jerry Rice. He also set a personal best with his ninth receiving touchdown. In the Patriots' Week 16 rematch against the Dolphins, Welker had 12 receptions for 138 yards, bringing him to a franchise-record 1,518 receiving yards, besting Randy Moss' 2007 record of 1,493 yards.

Through 15 games, Welker led the NFL in receptions, receiving yards, yards per game, and receptions for first downs, and ranked in the top five in receiving touchdowns and receptions of 20 yards or more. He finished the season with 122 receptions (tied for fourth-highest total in NFL history), 1,569 receiving yards and 98.5 yards per game (both second to Calvin Johnson of the Detroit Lions), and 77 receptions for first down (tied with Johnson for the NFL lead). He also had nine touchdown receptions. He was named to the Pro Bowl for the fourth time and earned First Team All-Pro honors for the second time in his career.

In the Divisional Round against the Denver Broncos, he had six receptions for 55 receiving yards and a receiving touchdown in the 45–10 victory. In the AFC Championship against the Baltimore Ravens, he had six receptions for 53 receiving yards. The Patriots reached Super Bowl XLVI where they faced off against the New York Giants in a rematch of Super Bowl XLII. In the Super Bowl, Welker had seven catches for 60 yards, but the Patriots lost to the Giants again, this time by a score of 21–17. Late in the fourth quarter with a little over four minutes remaining, with the Patriots ahead 17–15 and on the Giants' 44-yard line, Welker dropped a pass with both hands on the ball. Welker was near the Giants' 20-yard line. The Patriots were forced to punt and set up the Giants' eventual game-winning drive. He was ranked 23rd by his fellow players on the NFL Top 100 Players of 2012.

==== 2012 season ====
In the Patriots' Week 1 win over the Tennessee Titans, with three receptions for 14 yards in the 34–13 victory, Welker tied former Patriots receiver Troy Brown's franchise record for receptions; he took sole possession of the franchise record for receptions a week later against the Arizona Cardinals with five receptions for 95 yards. In Week 3, against the Baltimore Ravens, he had eight receptions for 142 yards in a narrow 31–30 loss. On October 14, in a 24–23 loss to the Seattle Seahawks, he had 10 receptions for 138 yards and a touchdown. During the Week 13 game against the Miami Dolphins, Welker, with, 12 receptions, set the NFL record for the most games with 10 or more receptions, tying him with 49ers legend and Hall of Famer Jerry Rice. It was his 17th game accomplishing the feat. He also set the NFL record for most games with 10 or more catches and 100 or more yards. With his 16th such performance, he moved ahead of Jerry Rice and Andre Johnson. Overall, he finished the 2012 season with 118 receptions for 1,354 receiving yards and six touchdowns. He ended the season tied with Chicago Bears receiver Brandon Marshall for second in receptions with 118, behind Detroit's Calvin Johnson. Welker earned his fifth Pro Bowl nomination.

In the Divisional Round against the Houston Texans, Welker had eight receptions for 131 receiving yards in the 41–28 victory. In the AFC Championship loss to the eventual Super Bowl XLVII champion Baltimore Ravens, he had eight receptions for 117 receiving yards and one receiving touchdown in what would be his final game as a Patriot in the 28–13 season-ending loss. He finished ranked 44th by his fellow players on the NFL Top 100 Players of 2013.

==== Patriots career summary ====
After joining the Patriots, Welker caught more passes than any player in the league during the 2007–2012 stretch, and ranked in the top five in yardage. Welker reached 500 receptions with the Patriots in just 70 games, an NFL record. Welker holds the franchise record for consecutive games with receptions, having caught a pass in every game, including the postseason, he played as a Patriot. By the end of the 2012 season, Welker held the all-time Patriots franchise record for receptions and in just 79 games he broke Troy Brown's record, who played more than twice as many games as a Patriot (192 regular-season games). Welker ranks third in receiving yards behind Stanley Morgan and Rob Gronkowski. With New England, Welker played in two Super Bowls (XLII and XLVI), falling short to the New York Giants each time. His most notable season was in 2011 with the Patriots, where he played in 16 games. In those games he recorded an impressive stat line with 122 receptions on 172 targets and 1,569 receiving yards. His yards per reception average was 12.9 and he recorded 9 touchdown receptions. His top play from the 2011 season was the 99 yard receiving TD from Tom Brady in Week 1 vs. the Miami Dolphins.

=== Denver Broncos ===
==== 2013 season ====
On March 13, 2013, Welker signed a two-year, $12 million contract with the Denver Broncos. Welker's signing with Denver was a result of Welker and the New England Patriots being unable to agree to a contract.

In his debut with the Broncos, Welker had nine receptions for 67 yards and two touchdowns in the 49–27 victory over the Baltimore Ravens on NBC Sunday Night Football. His two receiving touchdowns were part of a single-game record seven thrown by quarterback Peyton Manning. In Week 4, in a 52–20 victory over the Philadelphia Eagles, he had seven receptions for 76 yards and two touchdowns. By Week 11, Welker had more touchdowns than he had the entire previous season with New England (six), and as many as he had in any season with the Patriots (nine). He caught a touchdown pass in eight of the first ten games of the 2013 season.

In Week 14 against the Tennessee Titans, Welker took a hit to the head on a play across the middle late in the second quarter, and his neck bent awkwardly on the play. Welker previously suffered a concussion in Week 11 against the Kansas City Chiefs. He did not play for the rest of the regular season. Welker was part of the Broncos' historic offense which saw five players record at least ten touchdowns on the season.

On December 30, the day after Denver's 34–14 victory over the Oakland Raiders, head coach John Fox announced that Welker was cleared to play in the Broncos's Divisional Round playoff game against the San Diego Chargers on January 12, 2014. He had six receptions for 38 yards and a touchdown in the 24–17 victory in the Divisional Round. On January 19, Welker earned his third AFC Championship win and Super Bowl appearance after he helped the Broncos defeat his former team, the New England Patriots, 26–16. Welker had four receptions for 38 yards in the victory. The Broncos lost to the Seattle Seahawks, 43–8 in Super Bowl XLVIII. He had eight catches for 84 yards in the loss, the third such loss in the Super Bowl for Welker. He was ranked 73rd by his fellow players on the NFL Top 100 Players of 2014.

==== 2014 season ====
During the third preseason game on August 23, Welker was diagnosed with a concussion after a hit by Houston Texans safety D. J. Swearinger. The concussion was Welker's third in ten months. On September 2, the NFL suspended Welker for the first four games of the 2014 NFL season for violating the league's performance-enhancing drug policy after he failed a drug test due to amphetamines. On September 12, Welker's suspension was lifted due to the NFL's new drug policy. Welker made his season debut in Week 3, a 26–20 overtime loss to the Seattle Seahawks in a rematch of the previous year's Super Bowl. In a Week 5 game against the Arizona Cardinals on October 5, Welker passed Rod Smith for the most receptions by an undrafted player in NFL history. In a Week 7 game against the San Francisco 49ers, Welker caught his first touchdown of the season and it was Peyton Manning's 508th career touchdown pass, which tied Brett Favre for the most in NFL history. Overall, he finished the 2014 season with 49 receptions for 464 receiving yards and two receiving touchdowns. In the Divisional Round against the Indianapolis Colts, he had a 20-yard reception in the 24–13 loss. Welker did not re-sign with the Broncos and became a free agent.

=== St. Louis Rams ===
On November 9, 2015, the St. Louis Rams signed Welker to a one-year, $1.8 million contract. He appeared in eight games, but started none, and had 13 receptions for 102 yards for the Rams in the 2015 season. The 2015 season was Welker's last in the NFL as a player. He acknowledged he had retired in 2017.

== Career statistics ==
Legend
	NFL record
	Led the league
**Bold**	Career high

=== NFL ===
==== Regular season ====
Year	Team	Games		Receiving							Rushing					Punt return					Kickoff return					Fumbles	
Year	Team	GP	GS	Tgt	Rec	Yds	Avg	Lng	TD	FD	Att	Yds	Avg	Lng	TD	Ret	Yds	Avg	Lng	TD	Ret	Yds	Avg	Lng	TD	Fum	Lost
2004	SD	1	0	—	—	—	—	—	—	—	—	—	—	—	—	—	—	—	—	—	4	102	25.5	33	0	0	0
2004	MIA	14	0	—	—	—	—	—	—	—	—	—	—	—	—	**43**	**464**	10.8	**71**	0	57	1,313	23.0	**95**	**1**	4	**1**
2005	MIA	16	1	52	29	434	**15.0**	47	0	19	1	5	5.0	5	0	**43**	390	9.1	47	0	**61**	1,379	22.6	46	0	**5**	**1**
2006	MIA	16	2	100	67	687	10.3	38	1	33	—	—	—	—	—	41	378	9.2	47	0	48	1,064	22.2	46	0	3	**1**
2007	NE	16	13	145	112	1,175	10.5	42	8	65	4	34	8.5	**27**	0	25	249	10.0	35	0	7	176	25.1	33	0	3	0
2008	NE	16	14	149	111	1,165	10.5	64	3	57	3	26	8.7	19	0	24	237	9.9	44	0	1	26	**26.0**	26	0	1	**1**
2009	NE	14	13	162	**123**	1,348	11.0	58	4	71	**5**	**36**	7.2	11	0	27	338	**12.5**	69	0	2	45	22.5	27	0	2	0
2010	NE	15	11	123	86	848	9.9	35	7	47	—	—	—	—	—	5	36	7.2	22	0	—	—	—	—	—	1	0
2011	NE	16	15	173	122	**1,569**	12.9	**99T**	9	**77**	4	30	7.5	19	0	8	82	10.3	25	0	—	—	—	—	—	1	0
2012	NE	16	12	**174**	118	1,354	11.5	59	6	71	2	20	**10.0**	11	0	25	243	9.7	31	0	3	33	11.0	17	0	3	**1**
2013	DEN	13	13	111	73	778	10.7	33	**10**	49	—	—	—	—	—	10	70	7.0	27	0	—	—	—	—	—	1	**1**
2014	DEN	14	8	64	49	464	9.5	39	2	24	—	—	—	—	—	11	74	6.7	19	0	—	—	—	—	—	0	0
2015	STL	8	0	22	13	102	7.8	14	0	5	—	—	—	—	—	2	23	11.5	13	0	—	—	—	—	—	0	0
Career		175	102	1275	903	9,924	11.0	99T	50	518	19	151	7.9	27	0	264	2,584	9.8	71	0	183	4,138	22.6	95	1	24	6

==== Postseason ====
Year	Team	Games		Receiving							Rushing					Punt return					Fumbles	
Year	Team	GP	GS	Tgt	Rec	Yds	Avg	Lng	TD	FD	Att	Yds	Avg	Lng	TD	Ret	Yds	Avg	Lng	TD	Fum	Lost
2007	NE	3	3	**33**	**27**	213	7.9	19	**2**	**11**	1	13	**13.0**	**13**	0	2	29	**14.5**	15	0	0	0
2009	NE	0	0	Did not play due to injury																		
2010	NE	1	0	9	7	57	8.1	13	0	5	—	—	—	—	—	—	—	—	—	—	0	0
2011	NE	3	3	23	19	168	8.8	19	1	9	**2**	**21**	10.5	11	0	1	0	0.0	0	0	**1**	0
2012	NE	2	2	25	16	**248**	15.5	**47**	1	9	—	—	—	—	—	**5**	**56**	11.2	**28**	0	0	0
2013	DEN	3	3	24	18	160	8.9	22	1	7	—	—	—	—	—	—	—	—	—	—	0	0
2014	DEN	1	0	2	1	20	**20.0**	20	0	1	—	—	—	—	—	1	–1	–1.0	–1	0	0	0
Career		13	11	116	88	866	9.8	47	5	42	3	34	11.3	13	0	9	84	9.3	28	0	1	0

==== Super Bowl ====
Year	Date	Team	Opp.	Result	Receiving				Rushing				Punt Return				2PA
Year	Date	Team	Opp.	Result	Rec	Yds	Avg	TD	Att	Yds	Avg	TD	Ret	Yds	Avg	TD	2PA
2007	February 3, 2008	NE	NYG	L 14–17	**11**	**103**	9.4	0	—	—	—	—	**1**	**15**	**15.0**	0	—
2011	February 5, 2012	NE	NYG	L 17–21	7	60	8.6	0	**2**	**21**	**10.5**	0	—	—	—	—	—
2013	February 2, 2014	DEN	SEA	L 8–43	8	84	**10.5**	0	—	—	—	—	—	—	—	—	**1**
Total					26	247	9.5	0	2	21	10.5	0	1	15	15.0	0	1

=== College ===
Season	Team	Class	Pos	GP	Receiving				Rushing			
Season	Team	Class	Pos	GP	Rec	Yds	Avg	TD	Att	Yds	Avg	TD
2000	Texas Tech	FR	RB	12	26	334	**12.8**	0	6	72	**12.0**	**1**
2001	Texas Tech	SO	WR	11	50	582	11.6	5	15	97	6.5	0
2002	Texas Tech	JR	WR	14	86	1,054	12.3	7	**31**	**244**	7.9	0
2003	Texas Tech	SR	WR	13	**97**	**1,099**	11.3	**9**	27	146	5.4	**1**
Career				50	259	3,069	11.8	21	79	559	7.1	2

== Career highlights ==
=== Awards and honors ===
NFL

- 2× First-team All-Pro (2009, 2011)
- 2× Second-team All-Pro (2007, 2008)
- 5× Pro Bowl (2008–2012)
- 3× NFL receptions leader (2007, 2009, 2011)
- New England Patriots All-Dynasty Team
- New England Patriots All-2010s Team
- New England Patriots All-2000s Team
- PFWA All-Rookie Team (2004)
- 4× NFL Top 100 — 50th (2011), 23rd (2012), 44th (2013), 73rd (2014)

College

- Mosi Tatupu Award (2003)
- First-team All-Big 12 (2003)
- Second-team All-Big 12 (2002)
- Texas Tech Ring of Honor (2024)
- Oklahoma Sports Hall of Fame (2025)

=== Records ===
==== NFL records ====
- Most seasons with 105+ receptions: 5
- Most seasons with 110+ receptions: 5
- Most seasons with 115+ receptions: 3
- Most seasons with 120+ receptions: 2 (tied with Cris Carter, Antonio Brown and Michael Thomas)
- Most consecutive seasons with 110 receptions: 3 (tied with Antonio Brown)
- Most games with 12+ receptions: 9
- Most games with 13+ receptions: 5 (tied with Antonio Brown)
- Most games with 15+ receptions: 2 (tied with Jason Witten, Brandon Marshall, and Antonio Brown)
- Most games with 10+ receptions in a season: 7 (tied with Andre Johnson)
- Fastest receiver to have 500 catches with one team (New England Patriots) (70 games)
- Longest touchdown reception: 99 (September 2, 2011, against the Miami Dolphins) (tied with 12 others)
- Most receptions of any undrafted free agent in NFL history: 903
- Most career punt returns without a touchdown: 264
- Most career punt return yards without a touchdown: 2,584

==== Dolphins franchise records ====
- Most career kick return yards: 3,756
- Most career combined Kick and Punt return yards (4,988)
- Most all-purpose yards in a single season: 2,208 (2005)
- Most punt return yards in a single season: 464 (2004)

==== Patriots franchise records ====
- Most career receptions: 672
- Most receptions in a single season: 123 (2009)
- Most receiving yards in a single season: 1,569 (2011)
- Most seasons with 100 receptions or more: 5
- Best receiving yards per game average (season): 98.1 (2011)

== Coaching career ==
=== Houston Texans ===
On January 30, 2017, Welker began his coaching career and was hired by the Houston Texans as an offensive assistant and special teams assistant coach under head coach Bill O'Brien. That same year, NFL Films aired Wes Welker: A Football Life, which credits Welker as a game-changing slot receiver.

=== San Francisco 49ers ===
On February 27, 2019, Welker was hired by the San Francisco 49ers to be their wide receivers coach under head coach Kyle Shanahan.

=== Miami Dolphins ===
On February 18, 2022, Welker chose to follow head coach Mike McDaniel, the former offensive coordinator for the 49ers, to be the wide receivers coach on McDaniel's inaugural coaching staff with the Dolphins. Welker was fired on January 10, 2025.

=== Washington Commanders ===
Welker joined the Washington Commanders as a personnel analyst on April 8, 2025, working with both the personnel department and coaching staff. He moved to an offensive assistant role in February 2026 and was named tight ends coach in July 2026 following the firing of Ben Steele at the start of training camp.

== Personal life ==
Welker was born in Oklahoma City, Oklahoma, and is a Christian. He is a citizen of the Cherokee Nation, and has a grandmother who lives within Cherokee Nation jurisdiction in Sequoyah County, Oklahoma.

While attending Texas Tech University, Welker was a Texas Epsilon chapter member of the Phi Delta Theta fraternity. Welker graduated from Texas Tech University in 2003 with a Bachelor of Business Administration degree in Management from the Rawls College of Business.

In 2007, Welker established the 83 Foundation (after his NFL uniform number). The foundation, renamed the Wes Welker Foundation in December 2009, states that its goal is "to influence at-risk youth, by encouraging their full potential through athletics and positive role models". Its work primarily benefits schools and other organizations in Welker's hometown of Oklahoma City. Since its inception he has raised over $2,500,000 in grants to over 40 Oklahoma City schools and organizations.

In 2012, Welker married former swimsuit model and 2005 Miss Hooters Pageant Winner Anna Burns. They have three children. Welker owns a chestnut-colored gelding racehorse called Undrafted, trained by Wesley Ward. In 2014, Undrafted notched his first win in the Grade 3 Jaipur Invitational Stakes at Belmont. Undrafted also won the Group 1 2015 Diamond Jubilee Stakes at Ascot Racecourse.
