= Joe Kowalewski =

American football player (born 1982)

No. 40
- Position: Fullback

Personal information
- Born: November 15, 1982 (age 43); Syracuse, New York, U.S.
- Listed height: 6 ft 4 in (1.93 m)
- Listed weight: 250 lb (113 kg)

Career information
- College: Syracuse
- NFL draft: 2006: undrafted

Career history
- New York Jets (2006–2007); Miami Dolphins (2009)*
- * Offseason or practice squad member only

Career NFL statistics
- Receptions: 5
- Receiving yards: 18
- Receiving touchdowns: 1
- Stats at Pro Football Reference

Joe Kowalewski (born November 15, 1982) is an American former professional football player who was a fullback in the National Football League (NFL). He played college football for the Syracuse Orange and was signed by the New York Jets as an undrafted free agent in 2006.

Kowalewski was also a member of the Miami Dolphins.

== Early life ==
Born in Syracuse, New York, Kowalewski attended Solvay High School. In high school, he rushed for 1,114 yards and 12 touchdowns as a senior, and excelled on both sides of the ball.

== College career ==
While at Syracuse University, Kowalewski moved from defensive end to linebacker prior to the 2002 Spring practice, and to tight end before the beginning of the 2002 season. He totaled 33 receptions for 441 yards and three touchdowns during his collegiate career, while also achieving success academically. He graduated with a degree in retail and consumer studies.

== Professional career ==
=== New York Jets ===
Due to injuries, Kowalewski was unable to work out for pro scouts. He went undrafted in the 2006 NFL draft, but received invitations to try out for both the New York Jets and the Miami Dolphins. On the advice of his agent, he signed as an undrafted rookie free agent with New York on May 15, 2006.

After spending the 2006 season on the practice squad, Kowalewski made his NFL debut in the opening week of the 2007 season in a loss to the New England Patriots. Kowalewski scored his first NFL touchdown on November 4, 2007, against the Washington Redskins.

Kowalewski was waived on April 28, 2008.

=== Miami Dolphins ===
Kowalewski signed with the Miami Dolphins on August 11, 2009. He caught a two-yard touchdown pass from Chad Henne in the Dolphins' preseason contest against the Carolina Panthers on August 22. He was waived/injured on August 29 and subsequently placed on injured reserve on September 1 and eventually released with an injury settlement.
