= Abram Elam =

American football player (born 1981)

No. 26, 27, 37
- Position: Safety

Personal information
- Born: October 15, 1981 (age 45); West Palm Beach, Florida, U.S.
- Listed height: 6 ft 0 in (1.83 m)
- Listed weight: 212 lb (96 kg)

Career information
- High school: Cardinal Newman (West Palm Beach, Florida)
- College: Notre Dame (2001); Kent State (2004)
- NFL draft: 2005: undrafted

Career history
- Miami Dolphins (2005)*; Dallas Cowboys (2006); New York Jets (2007–2008); Cleveland Browns (2009–2010); Dallas Cowboys (2011); Kansas City Chiefs (2012)
- * Offseason or practice squad member only

Career NFL statistics
- Total tackles: 409
- Sacks: 5.0
- Forced fumbles: 8
- Fumble recoveries: 5
- Interceptions: 3
- Defensive touchdowns: 2
- Stats at Pro Football Reference

Abram Elam (born October 15, 1981) is an American former professional football player who was a safety in the National Football League (NFL) for the Dallas Cowboys, New York Jets, Cleveland Browns and Kansas City Chiefs. He played college football for the Notre Dame Fighting Irish and Kent State Golden Flashes.

== Early life ==
Elam opted to attend Cardinal Newman High School, instead of enrolling at Suncoast Community High School. He was a two-way player at quarterback and defensive back. As a senior, he registered 1,087 passing yards, 12 passing touchdowns, 542 rushing yards and 11 rushing touchdowns. He received All-state, Palm Beach County Player of the Year and Ft. Lauderdale Sun-Sentinel Offensive Player of the Year honors.

In basketball, he helped his team win two state Class AAA titles and was named to the All-conference team. He was the first four-year letterman in two sports in school history.

== College career ==
Elam accepted a football scholarship from the University of Notre Dame. As a freshman, he initially tried out for quarterback, before being moved to safety on the second day of two-a-day practices. He did not appear in any game.

As a sophomore, he appeared in 11 games, making 29 tackles, 2 interceptions, 2 sacks, one fumble recovery and one forced fumble. As a sophomore in 2002, a felony sexual battery conviction got him expelled from the school.

He attended Palm Beach Community College and worked at a dentist's office. He enrolled at Kent State University in 2004, but because he initially did not receive a scholarship, the Riviera Beach residents raised US$20,000 to pay for his tuition. As a senior, he appeared in 11 games, making 64 tackles (third on the team), 3 interceptions (tied for the team lead), 4 passes defensed and 6 punts returned for a 9.2-yard average.

== Professional career ==
Pre-draft measurables
Height	Weight
6 ft 0 in (1.83 m)	206 lb (93 kg)
Values from Pro Day

=== Miami Dolphins ===
Elam was signed as an undrafted free agent by the Miami Dolphins after the 2005 NFL draft on May 16. He was waived on July 28.

=== Dallas Cowboys (first stint) ===
On February 2, 2006, head coach Bill Parcells signed him as a free agent, based on a recommendation from Tucker Frederickson who had a son that played at Kent State University. He registered 15 special teams tackles (fourth on the team) and 4 kickoff returns for 95 yards.

On September 2, 2007, the team decided to keep Courtney Brown instead of Elam during last cuts of the preseason.

=== New York Jets ===
On September 12, 2007, the New York Jets signed him based on a recommendation from Bill Parcells and would start 8 games at safety. In 2008 he started 9 games. On April 25, 2009, he was sent to the Cleveland Browns as part of a trade to acquire the fifth overall pick in the 2009 NFL draft, in order to select Mark Sanchez.

=== Cleveland Browns ===
In 2009, he was reunited with former New York Jets head coach Eric Mangini and was the Browns starter at safety, registering 88 tackles (led the team), one sack, 2 passes defensed, one fumble recovery and one forced fumble.

In 2010, he posted 79 tackles, 2 interceptions, 10 passes defensed, 2 forced fumbles and 2 fumble recoveries.

=== Dallas Cowboys (second stint) ===
On August 3, 2011, after hiring his former Browns defensive coordinator Rob Ryan, the Cowboys signed him to a one-year contract as a free agent and named him the starter at safety. He started every game, while registering 79 tackles (second on the team), one forced fumble and one fumble recovery. He wasn't re-signed after the season.

=== Kansas City Chiefs ===
On June 5, 2012, Elam signed as a free agent with the Kansas City Chiefs to provide depth behind Eric Berry, who was returning from a serious knee injury. He wasn't re-signed at the end of the year.

== NFL career statistics ==
Legend
**Bold**	Career high

Year	Team	Games		Tackles					Interceptions					Fumbles			
Year	Team	GP	GS	Cmb	Solo	Ast	Sck	TFL	Int	Yds	TD	Lng	PD	FF	FR	Yds	TD
2006	DAL	15	0	14	13	1	0.0	0	0	0	0	0	0	1	1	1	0
2007	NYJ	13	8	53	39	14	0.0	2	0	0	0	0	2	0	0	0	0
2008	NYJ	**16**	9	69	48	**21**	**2.0**	3	1	**92**	**1**	**92**	3	**3**	0	0	0
2009	CLE	**16**	**16**	**91**	**74**	17	1.0	3	0	0	0	0	2	1	1	0	0
2010	CLE	**16**	15	79	65	14	**2.0**	3	**2**	18	0	18	**10**	2	**2**	**18**	**1**
2011	DAL	**16**	**16**	68	54	14	0.0	**4**	0	0	0	0	0	1	1	1	0
2012	KC	12	7	35	29	6	0.0	1	0	0	0	0	2	0	0	0	0
		104	71	409	322	87	5.0	16	3	110	1	92	19	8	5	20	1

== Personal life ==
Since 1987, three of Elam's siblings have been shot to death. His older brother, Donald Runner, was fatally shot in 1987. His sister Christina, was killed in 1999. On May 9, 2008, his older brother Donald Elam was fatally shot; at age 14, Donald was once the youngest person ever indicted for murder in Palm Beach County, though he was later acquitted.

On December 1, 2011, Abram's father died, and Dallas Cowboys owner Jerry Jones let Abram use his private plane to go to Florida to be with his family. His younger brother, Matt Elam played in the NFL for the Baltimore Ravens.

His son, Kaiir Elam, played defensive back for the University of Florida and was selected by the Buffalo Bills in the first round (23rd overall) of the 2022 NFL draft.
