= Jerry Mackey =

American football player (born 1984)

No. 46
- Position: Linebacker

Personal information
- Born: September 20, 1984 (age 42); New York City, New York, U.S.
- Listed height: 6 ft 1 in (1.85 m)
- Listed weight: 233 lb (106 kg)

Career information
- College: Syracuse
- NFL draft: 2007: undrafted

Career history
- Tampa Bay Buccaneers (2007)*; New York Jets (2007–2008)*
- * Offseason or practice squad member only

Jerry Joseph Mackey (born September 20, 1984) is an American former football linebacker. He was signed by the Tampa Bay Buccaneers as an undrafted free agent in 2007. He played college football at Syracuse.

Mackey was also a member of the New York Jets.

== Early life ==
PrepStar All-American … Rated the No. 8 prospect in New York by SuperPrep … New York Sportswriters Association First-team Class AA All-State as a senior and junior … All-Nassau County and All-Long Island as a senior … Received the Bill Piner Award as outstanding linebacker in Nassau County in 2001 … Had 85 tackles, 51 solo, one sack, two forced fumbles and three fumbles recoveries as a senior

== College career ==
Mackey was a 3-year starter at Syracuse at the Linebacker position. His sophomore year, he posted a career high 106 tackles. Though Mackey suffered a major shoulder injury late in his junior campaign and registered just 29 tackles that year. Mackey wore jersey #57 at Syracuse.

== Personal life ==
Jerry is the nephew of former NFL tight end John Mackey.
