= Dwayne Slay =

American gridiron football player (born 1984)

Profile
- Position: Safety

Personal information
- Born: June 21, 1984 (age 42); Brunswick, Georgia, U.S.
- Listed height: 6 ft 3 in (1.91 m)
- Listed weight: 214 lb (97 kg)

Career information
- High school: Brunswick (GA)
- College: Texas Tech
- NFL draft: 2006: undrafted

Career history
- Chicago Bears (2006)*; Amarillo Dusters (2007); Winnipeg Blue Bombers (2008)
- * Offseason or practice squad member only

Awards and highlights
- Sports Illustrated All-American 1st Team (2005); Associated Press Big 12 Conference Defensive Player of the Year (2005); First-team All-Big 12 (2005)

Dwayne Slay (born June 21, 1984) is an American former professional football player who was a safety. He played college football for the Texas Tech Red Raiders. Later he also played professionally for the Chicago Bears and Amarillo Dusters and Winnipeg Blue Bombers of the CFL.

== Playing career ==
=== College ===
While only playing for one season as a starter at Texas Tech, Slay set a new Big 12 record with eight forced fumbles in a single season. This achievement, along with Slay being one of the top tacklers in the Big 12, contributed to him being named Big 12 Defensive Player of the Year by the Associated Press and First-team All-Big 12 Conference in November, 2005. Slay was also named a First-team All-American by Sports Illustrated in December 2005, the first Red Raider thus selected since Montae Reagor in 1998.

In one game—against the Kansas State Wildcats on October 15, 2005—Slay had two big hits. The first was a tackle on Kansas Statewide receiver Davin Dennis that caused a fumble. Slay later caused another fumble when he hit quarterback Allan Everidge on an up-the-middle draw play that forced Everidge to the turf for several minutes. The Red Raiders won the game 59–20.

Towards the end of the season, ESPN's Mel Kiper, Jr. had Slay as one of his top 25 NFL draft prospects and many believed Slay would, at the very least, go late in the first day of the draft. However, after a poor pro-day workout at the NFL combine, Slay's status dropped significantly.

=== Professional ===
Pundits predicted that Dwayne Slay would be drafted by an NFL team in the seventh round of the 2006 NFL draft; but, after going undrafted, Slay instead signed a free agent contract with the Chicago Bears. Slay was released by the Bears due to injuring his hamstring. The Bears re-signed Slay and put him on the practice squad as a linebacker. He later left the team and was signed by the Amarillo Dusters. Slay moved on to sign with the Winnipeg Blue Bombers, but was later cut and is currently out of football.

== Personal life ==
Following his retirement from football, he returned to Texas. In 2015, he returned to at Texas Tech and completed his bachelor's degree in human sciences. He is the cousin of NFL cornerback Darius Slay.
