= List of people from Fayetteville, North Carolina =

The following is a list of notable people who have lived in Fayetteville, North Carolina.

== A ==
- Pamela Abshire, department chair and professor
- Dottie Alexander, former keyboardist for of Montreal
- Dwayne Allen, National Football League (NFL) tight end for New England Patriots
- Daniel Alvarez, soccer player
- Dominic A. Antonelli, former NASA astronaut
- Joey Arias, singer and performance artist
- Chris Armstrong, Canadian Football League (CFL) wide receiver

== B ==
- Charlie Baggett, NFL assistant coach
- Ellen S. Baker, physician and former NASA astronaut
- Velma Barfield, serial killer
- Garry Battle, professional arena football player
- Chip Beck, professional golfer, born in Fayetteville
- Ann Bilansky (c. 1820–1860), Fayetteville native hanged for murder
- Bunkie Blackburn, NASCAR driver
- Jaden Bradley, NFL wide receiver
- Doug Brochu, actor, comedian, and producer
- David "Bubba" Brooks, jazz tenor saxophonist
- Harold Floyd "Tina" Brooks, jazz musician, tenor saxophonist, and composer
- Terry M. Brown Jr., attorney and politician
- Xavier Brunson, United States Army lieutenant general
- Jonathan Byrd, folk singer-songwriter

== C ==
- John Benton Callis, politician and military officer
- Jeff Capel III, college basketball coach and former player
- Pamela Brewington Cashwell, politician and lawyer
- Lanhee Chen, policy advisor, attorney, and academic
- Judy Clay, soul and gospel singer
- J. Cole, rapper and producer
- Felisha Cooper, actress
- Clement Coward, United States Army major general
- Crystal Cox, track and field Olympian, gold medalist at 2004 Athens Summer Olympics
- Affion Crockett, actor, comedian, dancer, rapper and writer
- Aaron Curry, NFL linebacker

== D ==
- Elliott Daingerfield, artist
- Christopher Daniels, professional wrestler
- Russell Davis, NFL defensive tackle
- Sandra Diaz-Twine, reality TV contestant, winner of Survivor: Pearl Islands and Survivor: Heroes vs. Villains
- James C. Dobbin, United States Secretary of the Navy, 1853–1857
- Ryan Dunson, rock musician (Rookie of the Year)

== E ==
- Brad Edwards, NFL safety
- Jane Evans Elliot (1820–1886), Civil War memoirist
- Kevin Elliott, football wide receiver

== F ==
- Beth Finch, first female mayor of Fayetteville (1975–1981)
- Cortland Finnegan, NFL Pro Bowl cornerback
- George Floyd, his murder led to widespread protests in the U.S. and around the world
- Raymond Floyd, golfer, Masters and U.S. Open champion
- Luis Fonseca, United States Navy Hospital Corpsman and veteran of Iraq War
- Todd Fuller, NBA player

== G ==
- Lamont Gaillard, NFL player
- Gallagher, comedian
- Blenda Gay, NFL player
- J. Harrison Ghee, actor, singer, and dancer known for work in musical theater
- Frank P. Graham, president of University of North Carolina and U.S. senator
- Moonlight Graham, Major League Baseball (MLB) outfielder for New York Giants
- Naomi Graham, middleweight boxer, first female active duty service member to compete for U.S. at Olympics

== H ==
- Gary Hall Sr., swimmer, 3-time Olympic medalist
- Joe Harris, NFL linebacker
- Quanera Hayes, Olympic sprinter
- Brian Tyree Henry, actor
- Jimmy Herring, guitarist
- Sterling Hitchcock, MLB pitcher, 1998 NLCS MVP with San Diego Padres
- Kristina Holland, actress
- Chris Hondros, war photographer and 2004 Pulitzer Prize finalist
- Joe Horn, NFL wide receiver, 4-time Pro Bowl selection

== J ==
- Martin Jarmond, college athletic director
- Michael Joiner, professional basketball player
- Walter B. Jones Sr., served in U.S. House of Representatives

== K ==
- Lilliana Ketchman, dancer and YouTuber
- Aja Kim, singer and songwriter
- Cal Koonce, MLB pitcher, 1969 World Series champion with New York Mets

== L ==
- Mary Sampson Patterson Leary Langston, abolitionist
- Roxie Collie Laybourne, ornithologist
- David R. Lewis, member of North Carolina House of Representatives
- Calvin Lowry, United Football League (UFL) safety for Omaha Nighthawks

== M ==
- Nancy Mace, U.S. representative for South Carolina
- Elizabeth MacRae, actress
- Bernie Mangiboyat, rock musician (The Fifth)
- Eric Maynor, National Basketball Association (NBA) player
- Doug McDougald, NFL defensive end
- Everett McIver, NFL offensive guard
- Troy McLawhorn, musician, guitarist for Evanescence
- Jason "Mayhem" Miller, professional mixed martial arts fighter, hosted MTV's Bully Beatdown
- Dave Moody, Grammy-nominated artist, producer, songwriter, filmmaker
- Julianne Moore, Oscar-winning actress, born at Fort Bragg
- Kathryn Morgan, ballet dancer with New York City Ballet, born at Fort Bragg
- Morray, rapper and singer
- Marques Murrell, NFL linebacker

== N ==
- Gene Nicholson, college football coach
- Xavier Nixon, offensive tackle for Washington Redskins

== P ==
- Robert Martin Patterson, United States Army soldier and Medal of Honor recipient
- Shanaelle Petty, Miss Universe Croatia 2017
- Marshall Pitts Jr., first African-American mayor of Fayetteville
- Marvin Powell, NFL offensive tackle, 3-time All-Pro, 5-time Pro Bowl selection

== Q ==
- Mark Quander, United States Army brigadier general

== R ==
- Shea Ralph, head coach for the Vanderbilt Commodores women's basketball
- Jimmy Raye, former NFL wide receiver and coach
- Hiram Rhodes Revels, first African-American senator and member of Congress
- Jerry Richardson, first owner of NFL's Carolina Panthers

== S ==
- Antwoine Sanders, NFL safety
- LaToya Sanders, WNBA player
- Terry Sanford, politician and educator
- Terrmel Sledge, professional baseball player
- Dennis Smith Jr., NBA player
- Charles Manly Stedman, U.S. congressman and lieutenant governor of North Carolina
- Robert Strange, United States senator
- Harry Sydney, NFL running back

== T ==
- Moon Tae-jong, professional basketball player
- Kinnon Tatum, NFL player
- John Louis Taylor, jurist and first chief justice of the North Carolina Supreme Court
- Holden Thorp, served as tenth chancellor of University of North Carolina at Chapel Hill
- Tank Tyler, NFL defensive tackle

== U ==
- Oli Udoh, NFL offensive guard
- Kelvin Underwood, drum set and taiko musician

== W ==
- Christopher Watts, convicted murderer who killed his wife and two daughters in Colorado in 2018
- Dennis L. A. White, actor
- Doug Wilkerson, NFL guard for San Diego Chargers, All-Pro and 3-time Pro Bowl selection
- Robert Wilkie, former Secretary of Veterans Affairs
- C. J. Williams, professional basketball player in the Israeli Basketball Premier League
- Duvall Williams, former rear admiral in the United States Navy
- Gavin Williams, baseball player
- Jordan Williams, CFL linebacker, first overall pick of 2020 CFL draft
- Seth Williams, CFL defensive back
- David Williston, first professionally trained African American landscape architect in U.S.
- Donnell Woolford, NFL cornerback, Pro Bowl selection
- Christian Worley, civil rights activist

== See also ==
- List of people from North Carolina
