= 2007 Kansas Jayhawks football team =

American college football season

2007 Kansas Jayhawks football

Big 12 North co-champions Orange Bowl champion

Orange Bowl, W 24–21 vs. Virginia Tech
- Conference: Big 12 Conference
- North

Ranking
- Coaches: No. 7
- AP: No. 7
- Record: 12–1 (7–1 Big 12)
- Head coach: Mark Mangino (6th season)
- Offensive coordinator: Ed Warinner (1st season)
- Offensive scheme: Spread
- Co-defensive coordinators: Clint Bowen (2nd season); Bill Young (6th season)
- Base defense: 4–3
- Home stadium: Memorial Stadium

2007 Big 12 Conference football standings
| | Conf. | | | Overall |
| Team | W | | L | W | | L |
|---|---|---|---|---|---|---|
North Division
| No. 4 Missouri xy | 7 | – | 1 | 12 | – | 2 |
| No. 7 Kansas x% | 7 | – | 1 | 12 | – | 1 |
| Colorado | 4 | – | 4 | 6 | – | 7 |
| Kansas State | 3 | – | 5 | 5 | – | 7 |
| Nebraska | 2 | – | 6 | 5 | – | 7 |
| Iowa State | 2 | – | 6 | 3 | – | 9 |
South Division
| No. 8 Oklahoma xy$ | 6 | – | 2 | 11 | – | 3 |
| No. 10 Texas | 5 | – | 3 | 10 | – | 3 |
| No. 22 Texas Tech | 4 | – | 4 | 9 | – | 4 |
| Oklahoma State | 4 | – | 4 | 7 | – | 6 |
| Texas A&M | 4 | – | 4 | 7 | – | 6 |
| Baylor | 0 | – | 8 | 3 | – | 9 |
Championship: Oklahoma 38, Missouri 17
$ – BCS representative as conference champion; % – BCS at-large representative; x – Division champion/co-champions; y – Championship game participant; Rankings from AP Poll

The 2007 Kansas Jayhawks football team (variously "Kansas", "KU", or the "Jayhawks") represented the University of Kansas in the 2007 NCAA Division I FBS football season. The Jayhawks, coached by Mark Mangino in his sixth year with the program, finished the season 12–1 overall, a school record for wins, and 7–1 in Big 12 conference play. They defeated Virginia Tech in the 2008 Orange Bowl, the Jayhawks first and only BCS bowl victory. They finished the season ranked No. 7 in both major polls.

== Season summary ==
Looking to improve on the previous season's 6–6 overall record (3–5 in the Big 12 Conference), the team finished the 2007 season with a 12–1 overall record (7–1 in their conference). The twelve victories set a new school record. Additionally, the Jayhawks won their first eleven games before their first loss which was the most consecutive wins to start a season in school history. Additionally, the Jayhawks reached a ranking of 2 during their 11–0 start, the highest rank achieved by the team in school history. Their defeat of the Virginia Tech Hokies in the Orange Bowl was the school's first and only Orange Bowl and BCS bowl game victory. Their only loss was versus a Northern Division rival, the Missouri Tigers, in their final regular season game which resulted in a co-champion status of the Northern Division, but denied them a trip to the Big 12 Championship Game. For their achievements the team was awarded the Stanley Tools Breakthrough of the Year Award. The Jayhawks were ranked seventh in the final AP poll, the highest they had been ranked in the final poll since 1968, and they received a first place vote. This was also the first time that the Jayhawks had received a first place vote in any AP poll since November 4, 1968, and it was the first time they received a first place vote in the final AP poll of the season.

Mark Mangino, in his sixth season as the team's head coach, was named consensus coach of the year after winning every major coach of the year award. The team's new offensive coordinator was Ed Warinner (third year overall with Kansas), and their defensive coordinators were Bill Young (sixth year) and Clint Bowen (seventh year). The team captains were senior running back Brandon McAnderson, senior tight end Derek Fine, senior defensive lineman James McClinton, and junior cornerback Aqib Talib. The starting quarterback position was held by sophomore Todd Reesing with sophomore Kerry Meier as a backup and wide receiver.

They played their home games on Kivisto Field at Memorial Stadium in Lawrence, Kansas.

Three months after the Orange Bowl, the school's men's basketball team won the national championship, making Kansas only the second school in the country to win a BCS bowl game and basketball national championship in the same school year, along with Florida in 2006. The football and basketball teams' combined records were 49–4, which was the most combined victories in NCAA history.

== Coaching staff ==
The team was led by Mark Mangino in his sixth season as head coach. The team's 12 wins raised his overall coaching record to 37–36 (.507) and gave him his second bowl game win. At the end of the season Mangino was named the Big 12 Coach of the Year by the Big 12 coaches and Big 12 Co-Coach of the Year by the Associated Press. Other awards received include The Home Depot Coach of the Year Award, Walter Camp Coach of the Year, Eddie Robinson Coach of the Year, Paul "Bear" Bryant Award, and the Woody Hayes National Coach of the Year.

With the departure of offensive coordinator and quarterbacks coach Nick Quartaro at the end of the prior season, Ed Warinner returned from a two-season stint as Illinois's run-game coordinator and offensive line coach. He brought in a new, more aggressive, faster-paced, no-huddle offense. This was Warriner's third season with the Jayhawks as he had previously coached the offensive line and served as run-game coordinator in 2003 and 2004.

Bill Young (sixth year) and Clint Bowen (seventh year) were defensive coordinators. Tim Beck (third year) was the wide receivers coach and passing game coordinator. Louie Matsakis entered the season as the running backs coach and special teams coordinator.

== Schedule ==
| Date | Time | Opponent | Rank | Site | TV | Result | Attendance |
|---|---|---|---|---|---|---|---|
| September 1 | 6:00 p.m. | Central Michigan* | | Memorial Stadium; Lawrence, Kansas | Local Channels | W 52–7 | 46,815 |
| September 8 | 6:00 p.m. | Southeastern Louisiana* | | Memorial Stadium; Lawrence, Kansas | Local Channels | W 62–0 | 43,914 |
| September 15 | 6:00 p.m. | Toledo* | | Memorial Stadium; Lawrence, Kansas | Local Channels | W 45–13 | 48,112 |
| September 22 | 6:00 p.m. | FIU* | | Memorial Stadium; Lawrence, Kansas | Local Channels | W 55–3 | 42,134 |
| October 6 | 11:00 a.m. | at No. 24 Kansas State | | Bill Snyder Family Football Stadium; Manhattan, Kansas (Sunflower Showdown) | FSN | W 30–24 | 50,924 |
| October 13 | 1:00 p.m. | Baylor | No. 20 | Memorial Stadium; Lawrence, Kansas | FCS | W 58–10 | 43,556 |
| October 20 | 4:30 p.m. | at Colorado | No. 15 | Folsom Field; Boulder, Colorado | ESPN | W 19–14 | 51,940 |
| October 27 | 6:00 p.m. | at Texas A&M | No. 12 | Kyle Field; College Station, Texas | ESPN2 | W 19–11 | 85,341 |
| November 3 | 11:30 a.m. | Nebraska | No. 8 | Memorial Stadium; Lawrence, Kansas (rivalry) | FSN | W 76–39 | 51,910 |
| November 10 | 7:00 p.m. | at Oklahoma State | No. 5 | Boone Pickens Stadium; Stillwater, Oklahoma | ABC | W 43–28 | 39,848 |
| November 17 | 2:30 p.m. | Iowa State | No. 4 | Memorial Stadium; Lawrence, Kansas | ABC | W 45–7 | 51,050 |
| November 24 | 7:00 p.m. | vs. No. 3 Missouri | No. 2 | Arrowhead Stadium; Kansas City, Missouri (Border War, College GameDay) | ABC | L 28–36 | 80,537 |
| January 3, 2008 | 7:00 p.m. | vs. No. 5 Virginia Tech* | No. 8 | Dolphin Stadium; Miami Gardens, Florida (Orange Bowl) | FOX | W 24–21 | 74,111 |
*Non-conference game; Rankings from AP Poll released prior to the game; All times are in Central time

== Game summaries ==
=== Central Michigan ===
Central Michigan at Kansas

| Team | 1 | 2 | 3 | 4 | Total |
|---|---|---|---|---|---|
| Chippewas | 0 | 0 | 0 | 7 | 7 |
| • Jayhawks | 14 | 21 | 10 | 7 | 52 |

- Date: September 1
- Location: Memorial Stadium, Lawrence, Kansas
- Game start: 6:05 pm CST
- Elapsed time: 3:11
- Game attendance: 46,815
- Game weather: Sunny skies; 89 °F (32 °C); Wind E at 6 mph
- Referee: Clete Blakeman

Scoring summary
| Q1 | 07:21 | KU | Derek Fine 3 yd pass from Todd Reesing (Scott Webb kick) | KU 7–0 |
| Q1 | 03:25 | KU | Dezmon Briscoe 16 yd pass from Reesing (Webb kick) | KU 14–0 |
| Q2 | 06:38 | KU | Marcus Henry 46 yd pass from Reesing (Webb kick) | KU 21–0 |
| Q2 | 06:08 | KU | Raim Pendleton 77 yd punt return (Webb kick) | KU 28–0 |
| Q2 | 03:07 | KU | Aqib Talib 49 yd pass from Reesing (Webb kick) | KU 35–0 |
| Q3 | 09:48 | KU | Jake Sharp 3 yd run (Wolfert kick) | KU 42–0 |
| Q3 | 02:42 | KU | Webb 34 yd field goal | KU 45–0 |
| Q4 | 14:55 | CMU | Bryan Anderson 16 yd pass from Dan LeFevour (Andrew Aguila kick) | KU 45–7 |
| Q4 | 10:10 | KU | Pendleton 21 yd pass from Kerry Meier (Webb kick) | KU 52–7 |

| Statistics | CMU | KU |
|---|---|---|
| First downs | 17 | 28 |
| Total yards | 294 | 538 |
| Rushing yards | 114 | 230 |
| Passing yards | 196 | 317 |
| Passing: comp–att–int | 20–38–0 | 26–35–0 |
| Turnovers | 1 | 0 |

| Team | Category | Player | Statistics |
|---|---|---|---|
| Central Michigan | Passing | Dan LeFevour | 19/37, 172 yards, TD |
| Central Michigan | Rushing | Justin Hoskins | 4 rushes, 87 yards |
| Central Michigan | Receiving | Bryan Anderson | 7 receptions, 62 yards, TD |
| Kansas | Passing | Todd Reesing | 20/29, 261 yards, 4 TD |
| Kansas | Rushing | Brandon McAnderson | 16 rushes, 110 yards |
| Kansas | Receiving | Marcus Henry | 7 receptions, 103 yards, TD |

For their season-opening game on September 1, the Jayhawks hosted the defending Mid-American Conference champion Central Michigan Chippewas in the teams' first meeting. Central Michigan was led by Butch Jones in his first year as a head coach. Entering the game the Jayhawks had a 5–5 record against opponents from the MAC with the most recent result being the double-overtime loss to the Toledo Rockets in the third week of the 2006 season. The Jayhawks dominated the Chippewas in a 52–7 win to extend their streak of season-opening victories to four.

=== Southeastern Louisiana ===
Southeastern Louisiana at Kansas

| Team | 1 | 2 | 3 | 4 | Total |
|---|---|---|---|---|---|
| Lions | 0 | 0 | 0 | 0 | 0 |
| • Jayhawks | 9 | 20 | 19 | 14 | 62 |

- Date: September 8
- Location: Memorial Stadium, Lawrence, Kansas
- Game start: 6:05 pm CST
- Elapsed time: 3:03
- Game attendance: 43,914
- Game weather: Mostly sunny skies; 84 °F (29 °C); Wind NE at 7 mph
- Referee: Rick Loumiet

| Statistics | SELA | KU |
|---|---|---|
| First downs | 8 | 22 |
| Total yards | 75 | 501 |
| Rushing yards | -31 | 221 |
| Passing yards | 106 | 289 |
| Passing: comp–att–int | 22–34–0 | 14–24–0 |
| Turnovers | 0 | 0 |

| Team | Category | Player | Statistics |
|---|---|---|---|
| Southeastern Louisiana | Passing | Brian Babin | 20/30, 89 yards |
| Southeastern Louisiana | Rushing | Jay Lucas | 9 rushes, 12 yards |
| Southeastern Louisiana | Receiving | Byron Ross | 2 receptions, 22 yards |
| Kansas | Passing | Todd Reesing | 13/23, 257 yards, 2 TD |
| Kansas | Rushing | Brandon McAnderson | 11 rushes, 60 yards, 2 TD |
| Kansas | Receiving | Marcus Henry | 5 receptions, 119 yards |

On September 8, the Jayhawks hosted the Southeastern Louisiana Lions from the Southland Conference. With the Lions led by first-year head coach Mike Lucas, it was the teams' first meeting and only the second for the Jayhawks versus a Southland opponent; the first was a win at home versus the Northwestern State Demons to begin the previous season. The Jayhawks also recorded their first shutout since 2000.

=== Toledo ===
Toledo at Kansas

| Team | 1 | 2 | 3 | 4 | Total |
|---|---|---|---|---|---|
| Rockets | 0 | 7 | 0 | 6 | 13 |
| • Jayhawks | 10 | 14 | 21 | 0 | 45 |

- Date: September 15
- Location: Memorial Stadium, Lawrence, Kansas
- Game start: 6:05 pm CST
- Elapsed time: 3:21
- Game attendance: 48,112
- Game weather: Cloudy skies; 56 °F (13 °C); Wind SE at 9 mph
- Referee: Clete Blakeman

| Statistics | TOL | KU |
|---|---|---|
| First downs | 9 | 29 |
| Total yards | 251 | 557 |
| Rushing yards | 174 | 232 |
| Passing yards | 94 | 349 |
| Passing: comp–att–int | 14–27–3 | 18–39–0 |
| Turnovers | 5 | 3 |

| Team | Category | Player | Statistics |
|---|---|---|---|
| Toledo | Passing | Aaron Opelt | 10/19, 38 yards, 3 INT |
| Toledo | Rushing | DaJuane Collins | 14 rushes, 102 yards, TD |
| Toledo | Receiving | Aaron Opelt | 1 reception, 21 yards |
| Kansas | Passing | Todd Reesing | 16/35, 313 yards, 3 TD |
| Kansas | Rushing | Brandon McAnderson | 12 rushes, 52 yards, 2 TD |
| Kansas | Receiving | Marcus Henry | 7 receptions, 133 yards, TD |

On September 15, the Jayhawks hosted the Toledo Rockets for their third game in four seasons and fourth overall. Led by head coach Tom Amstutz in his seventh season, the Mid-American Conference team had defeated the Jayhawks the previous year in Toledo in a double-overtime loss. This 45–13 win gave the Jayhawks a 3–1 record versus the Rockets and a 7–5 record versus opponents from the MAC.

=== FIU ===
FIU at Kansas

| Team | 1 | 2 | 3 | 4 | Total |
|---|---|---|---|---|---|
| Panthers | 3 | 0 | 0 | 0 | 3 |
| • Jayhawks | 10 | 10 | 21 | 14 | 55 |

- Date: September 22
- Location: Memorial Stadium, Lawrence, Kansas
- Game start: 6:05 pm CST
- Elapsed time: 3:19
- Game attendance: 42,134
- Game weather: Sunny skies; 83 °F (28 °C); Wind ESE at 7 mph
- Referee: Cooper Castleberry

| Statistics | FIU | KU |
|---|---|---|
| First downs | 15 | 26 |
| Total yards | 255 | 615 |
| Rushing yards | 122 | 224 |
| Passing yards | 138 | 391 |
| Passing: comp–att–int | 16–36–2 | 25–39–1 |
| Turnovers | 5 | 3 |

| Team | Category | Player | Statistics |
|---|---|---|---|
| FIU | Passing | Wayne Younger | 16/33, 133 yards, TD, INT |
| FIU | Rushing | Wayne Younger | 10 rushes, 58 yards |
| FIU | Receiving | Jason Frierson | 4 receptions, 42 yards |
| Kansas | Passing | Todd Reesing | 23/37, 368 yards, TD, INT |
| Kansas | Rushing | Brandon McAnderson | 13 rushes, 105 yards, 2 TD |
| Kansas | Receiving | Dexton Fields | 4 receptions, 77 yards |

For their fourth and final non-conference game on September 22, the Jayhawks hosted the FIU Golden Panthers of the Sun Belt Conference in the teams' first meeting. FIU was led by first-year head coach Mario Cristobal.

=== At No. 24 Kansas State ===
Kansas at No. 24 Kansas State

| Team | 1 | 2 | 3 | 4 | Total |
|---|---|---|---|---|---|
| • Jayhawks | 0 | 14 | 7 | 9 | 30 |
| No. 24 Wildcats | 7 | 7 | 3 | 7 | 24 |

- Date: October 6
- Location: Bill Snyder Family Football Stadium, Manhattan, Kansas
- Game start: 11:08 am CST
- Elapsed time: 3:26
- Game attendance: 50,924
- Game weather: Partly cloudy skies; 79 °F (26 °C); Wind SSW at 18 mph
- Referee: Randy Christal
- TV announcers (FSN): Bill Land, Gary Reasons, & Emily Jones

| Statistics | KU | KSU |
|---|---|---|
| First downs | 24 | 17 |
| Total yards | 437 | 363 |
| Rushing yards | 170 | 53 |
| Passing yards | 267 | 316 |
| Passing: comp–att–int | 22–35–3 | 32–49–3 |
| Turnovers | 3 | 3 |

| Team | Category | Player | Statistics |
|---|---|---|---|
| Kansas | Passing | Todd Reesing | 22/35, 267 yards, 3 TD, 3 INT |
| Kansas | Rushing | Jake Sharp | 16 rushes, 81 yards, TD |
| Kansas | Receiving | Dexton Fields | 6 receptions, 78 yards, TD |
| Kansas State | Passing | Josh Freeman | 31/48, 305 yards, TD, 3 INT |
| Kansas State | Rushing | James Johnson | 11 rushes, 30 yards |
| Kansas State | Receiving | Jordy Nelson | 10 receptions, 137 yards, TD |

Todd Reesing led the Jayhawks to victory in Manhattan for the first time in eighteen years. Aqib Talib sealed the game by picking off Josh Freeman's pass with less than two minutes left in the game.

The Jayhawks got their first touchdown on Kansas State's home field since 1999 when Jake Sharp, apparently stopped for a short gain, burst out of a gang of tacklers and sped 20 yards to make it 7–7 with 9:11 left in the first half. Sharp had picked up 14 yards the previous play.

The victory was KU's third in the last four Governor's Cup games against KSU, and increased their all-time lead in the Sunflower Showdown to 64–36–5.

The Wildcats came into the game ranked 24th in the nation. It was the Jayhawks first win over a ranked team since 2003 when the Jayhawks defeated 23rd ranked Missouri 35–14.

=== Baylor ===
Baylor at No. 20 Kansas

| Team | 1 | 2 | 3 | 4 | Total |
|---|---|---|---|---|---|
| Bears | 3 | 0 | 7 | 0 | 10 |
| • No. 20 Jayhawks | 10 | 21 | 10 | 17 | 58 |

- Date: October 13
- Location: Memorial Stadium, Lawrence, Kansas
- Game start: 1:15 pm CST
- Elapsed time: 3:48
- Game attendance: 43,556
- Game weather: Stormy skies; 62 °F (17 °C); Wind SE at 20 mph
- Referee: Jon Bible
- TV announcers (FCS): Dan McLaughlin & Rich Baldinger

| Statistics | BAY | KU |
|---|---|---|
| First downs | 10 | 25 |
| Total yards | 202 | 447 |
| Rushing yards | 48 | 236 |
| Passing yards | 161 | 233 |
| Passing: comp–att–int | 22–43–4 | 18–37–0 |
| Turnovers | 5 | 0 |

| Team | Category | Player | Statistics |
|---|---|---|---|
| Baylor | Passing | Blake Szymanski | 18/33, 119 yards, 3 INT |
| Baylor | Rushing | Brandon Whitaker | 12 rushes, 54 yards |
| Baylor | Receiving | Brandon Whitaker | 7 receptions, 45 yards |
| Kansas | Passing | Todd Reesing | 14/31, 186 yards, 2 TD |
| Kansas | Rushing | Jake Sharp | 18 rushes, 110 yards, TD |
| Kansas | Receiving | Marcus Henry | 1 reception, 54 yards, TD |

Lightning delayed the start of the game 2 hours. Reesing passed for 186 yards as the Jayhawks were 6–0 for the first time since 1995. It was the Jayhawks first game as a ranked team since September 28, 1996.

=== At Colorado ===
No. 15 Kansas at Colorado

| Team | 1 | 2 | 3 | 4 | Total |
|---|---|---|---|---|---|
| • No. 15 Jayhawks | 0 | 3 | 10 | 6 | 19 |
| Buffaloes | 0 | 0 | 7 | 7 | 14 |

- Date: October 20
- Location: Folsom Field, Boulder, Colorado
- Game start: 3:32 pm CST
- Elapsed time: 3:19
- Game attendance: 51,940
- Game weather: Partly cloudy skies; 75 °F (24 °C); Wind W at 17 mph
- Referee: Tom Walker
- TV announcers (ESPN): Ron Franklin, Ed Cunningham, & Jack Arute

| Statistics | KU | COLO |
|---|---|---|
| First downs | 17 | 19 |
| Total yards | 333 | 353 |
| Rushing yards | 180 | 66 |
| Passing yards | 153 | 311 |
| Passing: comp–att–int | 20–29–0 | 27–45–2 |
| Turnovers | 2 | 3 |

| Team | Category | Player | Statistics |
|---|---|---|---|
| Kansas | Passing | Todd Reesing | 20/29, 153 yards, TD |
| Kansas | Rushing | Todd Reesing | 7 rushes, 84 yards |
| Kansas | Receiving | Marcus Henry | 5 receptions, 81 yards |
| Colorado | Passing | Cody Hawkins | 27/44, 287 yards, 2 TD, 2 INT |
| Colorado | Rushing | Hugh Charles | 11 rushes, 39 yards |
| Colorado | Receiving | Tyson DeVree | 7 receptions, 90 yards, TD |

=== At Texas A&M ===
No. 10 Kansas at Texas A&M

| Team | 1 | 2 | 3 | 4 | Total |
|---|---|---|---|---|---|
| • No. 10 Jayhawks | 0 | 0 | 13 | 6 | 19 |
| Aggies | 0 | 0 | 0 | 11 | 11 |

- Date: October 27
- Location: Kyle Field, College Station, Texas
- Game start: 6:06 pm CST
- Elapsed time: 3:30
- Game attendance: 85,341
- Game weather: Clear skies; 74 °F (23 °C); Wind NE at 12 mph
- Referee: Jon Bible
- TV announcers (ESPN2): Gary Thorne, Bob Davie, & Stacey Dales

| Statistics | KU | TAMU |
|---|---|---|
| First downs | 24 | 16 |
| Total yards | 407 | 318 |
| Rushing yards | 227 | 74 |
| Passing yards | 180 | 244 |
| Passing: comp–att–int | 21–33–0 | 24–45–0 |
| Turnovers | 0 | 1 |

| Team | Category | Player | Statistics |
|---|---|---|---|
| Kansas | Passing | Todd Reesing | 21/33, 180 yards |
| Kansas | Rushing | Brandon McAnderson | 21 rushes, 183 yards, 2 TD |
| Kansas | Receiving | Dezmon Briscoe | 6 receptions, 49 yards |
| Texas A&M | Passing | Stephen McGee | 24/44, 244 yards, TD |
| Texas A&M | Rushing | Mike Goodson | 9 rushes, 33 yards |
| Texas A&M | Receiving | Martellus Bennett | 8 receptions, 91 yards |

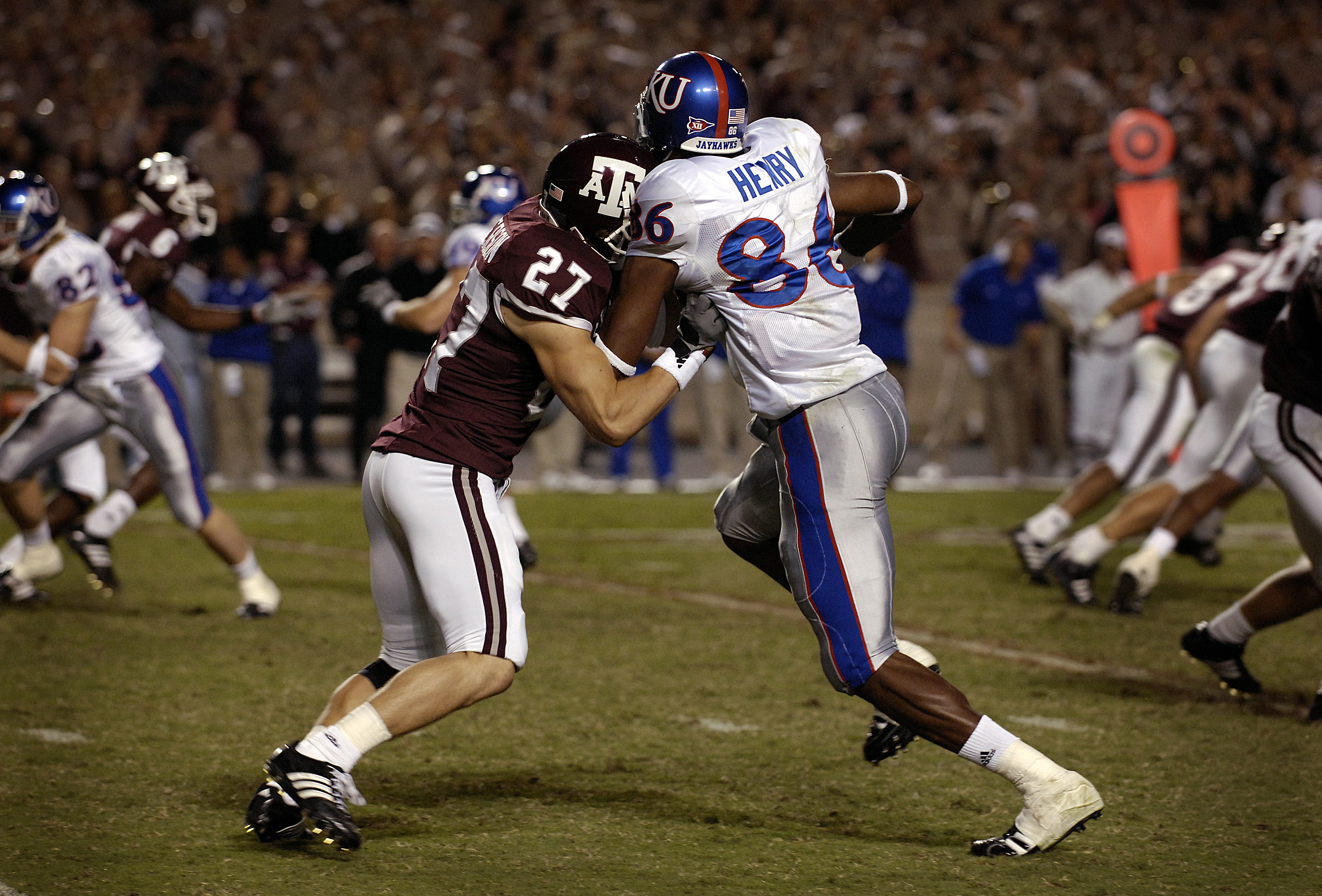
Marcus Henry (#86) makes a reception against Texas A&M

This was the Jayhawks' 9th meeting with the Texas A&M Aggies. A&M entered the game leading the series 7–1, and had only lost the first meeting in Lawrence in 1974. Kansas was the only Big 12 team that A&M was undefeated against, ever since the Big 12 formed in 1996. Kansas was the first top 10 team, excluding Oklahoma and Texas, to play at Kyle Field since 2002. A&M had compiled a 6–3 record for games played against top 10 teams (other than OU and Texas) at Kyle Field. In their previous meeting in 2006, A&M outscored Kansas 21–18. One day prior to the game, Las Vegas casinos favored Kansas to win by three points.

Kansas entered the game with a 16th-ranked rushing offense, 25th-ranked passing offense, and a 3rd-ranked scoring offense. Kansas' rushing defense ranked 4th, pass defense ranked 10th, and overall defense ranked 5th. Kansas also had ranked 9th in the weekly BCS standings. A&M came into the game with a 5th-ranked rushing offense, and a 111th ranked passing offense. The pass defense ranked 100th, scoring defense ranked 42nd, and overall defense ranked 73rd.

In the game, KU running back Brandon McAnderson rushed for a career-high of 183 yards, and quarterback Todd Reesing completed 21 of 33 passes for 180 yards. Through the first three quarters, the Jayhawks shutout the Aggies' 5th-ranked rushing offense and held them to only 56 yards. A&M running back Jorvorskie Lane had only rushed for 24 yards the entire game. KU gained a 13–0 lead in the third quarter, after kicker Scott Webb kicked two field goals and Reesing led his team to a 54-yard touchdown drive on 6 plays. In the fourth quarter, Reesing led his team to a 43-yard touchdown drive on 4 plays.

For the first time since 1909, the Jayhawks improved to an 8–0 season record. This was also the first time that KU won in Texas since 2001 (not including bowl games).

=== Nebraska ===
Nebraska at No. 8 Kansas

| Team | 1 | 2 | 3 | 4 | Total |
|---|---|---|---|---|---|
| Cornhuskers | 14 | 10 | 7 | 8 | 39 |
| • No. 8 Jayhawks | 21 | 27 | 21 | 7 | 76 |

- Date: November 3
- Location: Memorial Stadium, Lawrence, Kansas
- Game start: 11:38 am CST
- Elapsed time: 3:43
- Game attendance: 51,910
- Game weather: Sunny skies; 47 °F (8 °C); Wind calm
- Referee: Randy Christal
- TV announcers (FSN): Bill Land, Dave Lapham, & Emily Jones

| Statistics | NEB | KU |
|---|---|---|
| First downs | 22 | 34 |
| Total yards | 484 | 572 |
| Rushing yards | 79 | 218 |
| Passing yards | 405 | 354 |
| Passing: comp–att–int | 25–50–4 | 30–41–0 |
| Turnovers | 5 | 0 |

| Team | Category | Player | Statistics |
|---|---|---|---|
| Nebraska | Passing | Joe Ganz | 25/50, 405 yards, 4 TD, 4 INT |
| Nebraska | Rushing | Roy Helu | 9 rushes, 56 yards |
| Nebraska | Receiving | Maurice Purify | 7 receptions, 158 yards, 3 TD |
| Kansas | Passing | Todd Reesing | 30/41, 354 yards, 6 TD |
| Kansas | Rushing | Brandon McAnderson | 25 rushes, 119 yards, 4 TD |
| Kansas | Receiving | Marcus Henry | 6 receptions, 101 yards, TD |

The Nebraska-Kansas series is the longest uninterrupted series in college football at 102 years. In the 2007 meeting, Kansas beat Nebraska 76–39. Their 48 points in the first half was the most ever scored against Nebraska in the first half; and it came one point short of tying the record for most points scored on Nebraska in a half. With the win, Kansas took their record to 9–0 for the first time since 1908.

Fox Sports reported, "It was only the second victory for Kansas in the last 39 games against Nebraska, which appears to be coming to pieces in the fourth season of embattled coach Bill Callahan."

=== At Oklahoma State ===
No. 5 Kansas at Oklahoma State

| Team | 1 | 2 | 3 | 4 | Total |
|---|---|---|---|---|---|
| • No. 5 Jayhawks | 10 | 10 | 13 | 10 | 43 |
| Cowboys | 7 | 7 | 7 | 7 | 28 |

- Date: November 10
- Location: Boone Pickens Stadium, Stillwater, Oklahoma
- Game start: 7:05 pm CST
- Elapsed time: 3:34
- Game attendance: 39,848
- Game weather: Cloudy skies; 68 °F (20 °C); Wind SSE at 9 mph
- Referee: Cooper Castleberry
- TV announcers (ABC): Brent Musburger, Kirk Herbstreit, & Lisa Salters

Scoring summary
| Q1 | 06:35 | KU | Marcus Henry 5 yd TD pass from Todd Reesing (Scott Webb kick) | KU 7–0 |
| Q1 | 03:29 | OSU | Dez Bryant 18 yd TD pass from Zac Robinson (Dan Bailey kick) | Tie 7–7 |
| Q1 | 00:37 | KU | Webb 30 yd field goal | KU 10–7 |
| Q2 | 10:17 | OSU | Julius Crosslin 1 yd TD run (Bailey kick) | OSU 14–10 |
| Q2 | 07:17 | KU | Brandon McAnderson 5 yd TD run (Webb kick) | KU 17–14 |
| Q2 | 02:24 | KU | Webb 42 yd field goal | KU 20–14 |
| Q3 | 12:33 | KU | Henry 82 yd TD pass from Reesing (Webb kick) | KU 27–14 |
| Q3 | 08:56 | KU | McAnderson 12 yd TD run (Reesing pass failed) | KU 33–14 |
| Q3 | 00:54 | OSU | T. Devereaux 39 yd pass from Robinson (Bailey kick) | KU 33–21 |
| Q4 | 13:08 | OSU | Robinson 3 yd TD run (Bailey kick) | KU 33–28 |
| Q4 | 08:26 | KU | Henry 4 yd TD pass from Reesing (Webb kick) | KU 40–28 |
| Q4 | 05:31 | KU | Webb 22 yd field goal | KU 43–28 |

| Statistics | KU | OKST |
|---|---|---|
| First downs | 24 | 18 |
| Total yards | 529 | 471 |
| Rushing yards | 167 | 195 |
| Passing yards | 362 | 276 |
| Passing: comp–att–int | 28–41–0 | 22–37–1 |
| Turnovers | 0 | 4 |

| Team | Category | Player | Statistics |
|---|---|---|---|
| Kansas | Passing | Todd Reesing | 27/40, 318 yards, 3 TD |
| Kansas | Rushing | Brandon McAnderson | 25 rushes, 132 yards, 2 TD |
| Kansas | Receiving | Marcus Henry | 8 receptions, 199 yards, 3 TD |
| Oklahoma State | Passing | Zac Robinson | 22/37, 276 yards, 2 TD, INT |
| Oklahoma State | Rushing | Dantrell Savage | 18 rushes, 106 yards |
| Oklahoma State | Receiving | Dez Bryant | 8 receptions, 155 yards, TD |

The Kansas Jayhawks game against the Oklahoma State Cowboys attracted a great deal of attention. This was due to the match up between both potent offenses. The crucial match up was that between cornerback Aqib Talib and star Cowboy wideout Adarius Bowman. In the 2006 matchup between the two, Bowman had 13 catches for 300 yards. However Bowman left the game with an injury after the first half. In the first half, he was held to 22 yards on 4 catches with no touchdowns. The game was broadcast to 63 percent of the nation on ABC as the top primetime college football game of the week.

The Jayhawks went to 10–0 for the first time since 1899.

=== Iowa State ===
Iowa State at No. 4 Kansas

| Team | 1 | 2 | 3 | 4 | Total |
|---|---|---|---|---|---|
| Cyclones | 0 | 7 | 0 | 0 | 7 |
| • No. 4 Jayhawks | 14 | 14 | 3 | 14 | 45 |

- Date: November 17
- Location: Memorial Stadium, Lawrence, Kansas
- Game start: 4:47 pm CST
- Elapsed time: 3:23
- Game attendance: 51,050
- Game weather: Partly cloudy skies; 66 °F (19 °C); Wind SE at 5 mph
- Referee: Tom Walker
- TV announcers (ABC): Ron Franklin, Ed Cunningham, & Jack Arute

Scoring summary
| Q1 | 05:27 | KU | Dexton Fields 17 yd TD pass from Todd Reesing (Scott Webb kick) | KU 7–0 |
| Q1 | 01:57 | KU | Fields 16 yd TD pass from Reesing (Webb kick) | KU 14–0 |
| Q2 | 08:42 | KU | Marcus Henry 51 yd TD pass from Reesing (Webb kick) | KU 21–0 |
| Q2 | 03:54 | ISU | Alexander Robinson 6 yd TD run (Bret Culbertson kick) | KU 21–7 |
| Q2 | 01:56 | KU | Kerry Meier 18 yd TD pass from Reesing (Webb kick) | KU 28–7 |
| Q3 | 07:53 | KU | Webb 37 yd field goal | KU 31–7 |
| Q4 | 06:58 | KU | Derek Fine 4 yd TD pass from Meier (Webb kick) | KU 38–7 |
| Q4 | 02:39 | KU | Angus Quigley 13 yd TD run (Webb kick) | KU 45–7 |

| Statistics | ISU | KU |
|---|---|---|
| First downs | 16 | 31 |
| Total yards | 234 | 566 |
| Rushing yards | 52 | 212 |
| Passing yards | 182 | 354 |
| Passing: comp–att–int | 24–43–1 | 30–35–0 |
| Turnovers | 1 | 0 |

| Team | Category | Player | Statistics |
|---|---|---|---|
| Iowa State | Passing | Bret Meyer | 16/28, 103 yards |
| Iowa State | Rushing | Alexander Robinson | 20 rushes, 54 yards, TD |
| Iowa State | Receiving | Marquis Hamilton | 5 receptions, 86 yards |
| Kansas | Passing | Todd Reesing | 21/26, 253 yards, 4 TD |
| Kansas | Rushing | Jake Sharp | 15 rushes, 83 yards |
| Kansas | Receiving | Dexton Fields | 11 receptions, 109 yards, 2 TD |

The victory over Iowa State brought KU's record to 11–0, the first time in school history that the football team won 11 games in a season. As a result, the Jayhawks were featured on the cover of Sports Illustrated the following week.

=== Vs. No. 3 Missouri ===
No. 3 Missouri vs. No. 2 Kansas

| Team | 1 | 2 | 3 | 4 | Total |
|---|---|---|---|---|---|
| • No. 3 Tigers | 7 | 7 | 14 | 8 | 36 |
| No. 2 Jayhawks | 0 | 0 | 7 | 21 | 28 |

- Date: November 24
- Location: Arrowhead Stadium, Kansas City, Missouri
- Game start: 7:13 pm CST
- Elapsed time: 3:32
- Game attendance: 80,537
- Game weather: Fair skies; 33 °F (1 °C); Wind S at 4 mph
- Referee: Jon Bible
- TV announcers (ABC): Brent Musburger, Kirk Herbstreit, & Lisa Salters

Scoring summary
| Q1 | 00:29 | MU | Martin Rucker 1 yd TD pass from Chase Daniel (Jeff Wolfert kick) | MU 7–0 |
| Q2 | 09:21 | MU | Dana Alexander 11 yd TD pass from Daniel (Wolfert kick) | MU 14–0 |
| Q3 | 10:36 | MU | Jimmy Jackson 1 yd TD run (Wolfert kick) | MU 21–0 |
| Q3 | 07:21 | KU | Brandon McAnderson 1 yd TD run (Scott Webb kick) | MU 21–7 |
| Q3 | 01:19 | MU | Derek Washington 3 yd TD pass from Daniel (Wolfert kick) | MU 28–7 |
| Q4 | 13:02 | KU | Todd Reesing 5 yd TD run (Webb kick) | MU 28–14 |
| Q4 | 09:55 | MU | Wolfert 43 yd field goal | MU 31–14 |
| Q4 | 08:28 | KU | Dexton Fields 10 yd TD pass from Reesing (Webb kick) | MU 31–21 |
| Q4 | 03:31 | MU | Wolfert 43 yd field goal | MU 34–21 |
| Q4 | 02:03 | KU | Marcus Henry 5 yd TD pass from Reesing (Webb kick) | MU 34–28 |
| Q4 | 00:12 | MU | Loren Williams safety | MU 36–28 |

| Statistics | MIZ | KU |
|---|---|---|
| First downs | 29 | 23 |
| Total yards | 519 | 391 |
| Rushing yards | 151 | 42 |
| Passing yards | 368 | 349 |
| Passing: comp–att–int | 41–50–0 | 28–49–2 |
| Turnovers | 0 | 2 |

| Team | Category | Player | Statistics |
|---|---|---|---|
| Missouri | Passing | Chase Daniel | 40/49, 361 yards, 3 TD |
| Missouri | Rushing | Tony Temple | 22 rushes, 98 yards |
| Missouri | Receiving | Danario Alexander | 8 receptions, 117 yards, TD |
| Kansas | Passing | Todd Reesing | 28/49, 349 yards, 2 TD, 2 INT |
| Kansas | Rushing | Brandon McAnderson | 14 rushes, 41 yards, TD |
| Kansas | Receiving | Dexton Fields | 8 receptions, 116 yards, TD |

On November 24 the Jayhawks met the Missouri Tigers at Arrowhead Stadium, in Kansas City, Missouri, in the final regular season game of the year. Known as the Border Showdown, this year's annual contest was the most significant in recent years as the winner would advance to the Dr Pepper Big 12 Championship Game in San Antonio, Texas, and likely claim the top spot in the BCS rankings and national polls with a win (No. 1 LSU lost 50-48 in triple overtime the previous day to Arkansas), which would be a first for both schools. The game received considerable media attention, and the ESPN College Gameday crew were at the game, the first time the Jayhawks had been featured as College GameDay's Game of the Week in football. It drew 80,537, the second-highest attendance in the 35-year history of Arrowhead Stadium. The Jayhawks entered the contest with an eleven-game winning streak since losing the final game of the 2006 season against their cross-border rivals in Columbia, Missouri, by a score of 42–17. But they would leave with their second straight loss versus the Tigers and a 6–6 series record since the formation of the Big 12 Conference.

=== Vs. No. 5 Virginia Tech (Orange Bowl) ===
2008 Orange Bowl
No. 8 Kansas vs. No. 5 Virginia Tech

| Team | 1 | 2 | 3 | 4 | Total |
|---|---|---|---|---|---|
| • No. 8 Jayhawks | 7 | 10 | 0 | 7 | 24 |
| No. 5 Hokies | 0 | 7 | 7 | 7 | 21 |

- Date: January 3, 2008
- Location: Dolphin Stadium, Miami Gardens, Florida
- Game start: 7:20 pm CST
- Elapsed time: 3:34
- Game attendance: 74,111
- Game weather: Cloudy skies; 57 °F (14 °C); Wind N at 11 mph
- Referee: Bill LeMonnier
- TV announcers (FOX): Kenny Albert, Daryl Johnston, Barry Alvarez & Jeanne Zelasko

Scoring summary
| Q1 | 05:15 | KU | Aqib Talib 60 yd interception return (Scott Webb kick) | KU 7–0 |
| Q2 | 12:00 | KU | Webb 32 yd field goal | KU 10–0 |
| Q2 | 07:03 | KU | Marcus Henry 13 yd TD pass from Todd Reesing (Webb kick) | KU 17–0 |
| Q2 | 01:24 | VT | Branden Ore 1 yd TD run (Jud Dunlevy kick) | KU 17–7 |
| Q3 | 11:35 | VT | Justin Harper 84 yd TD punt return (Dunlevy kick) | KU 17–14 |
| Q4 | 10:57 | KU | Reesing 2 yd TD run (Webb kick) | KU 24–14 |
| Q4 | 03:00 | VT | Harper 20 yd TD pass from Sean Glennon (Dunlevy kick) | KU 24–21 |

| Statistics | KU | VT |
|---|---|---|
| First downs | 19 | 20 |
| Total yards | 344 | 306 |
| Rushing yards | 95 | 135 |
| Passing yards | 249 | 171 |
| Passing: comp–att–int | 21–38–1 | 14–31–3 |
| Turnovers | 1 | 3 |

| Team | Category | Player | Statistics |
|---|---|---|---|
| Kansas | Passing | Todd Reesing | 20/37, 227 yards, TD, INT |
| Kansas | Rushing | Brandon McAnderson | 15 rushes, 75 yards |
| Kansas | Receiving | Dexton Fields | 7 receptions, 101 yards |
| Virginia Tech | Passing | Sean Glennon | 13/28, 160 yards, TD, 2 INT |
| Virginia Tech | Rushing | Brandon Ore | 23 rushes, 116 yards, TD |
| Virginia Tech | Receiving | Justin Harper | 4 receptions, 64 yards, TD |

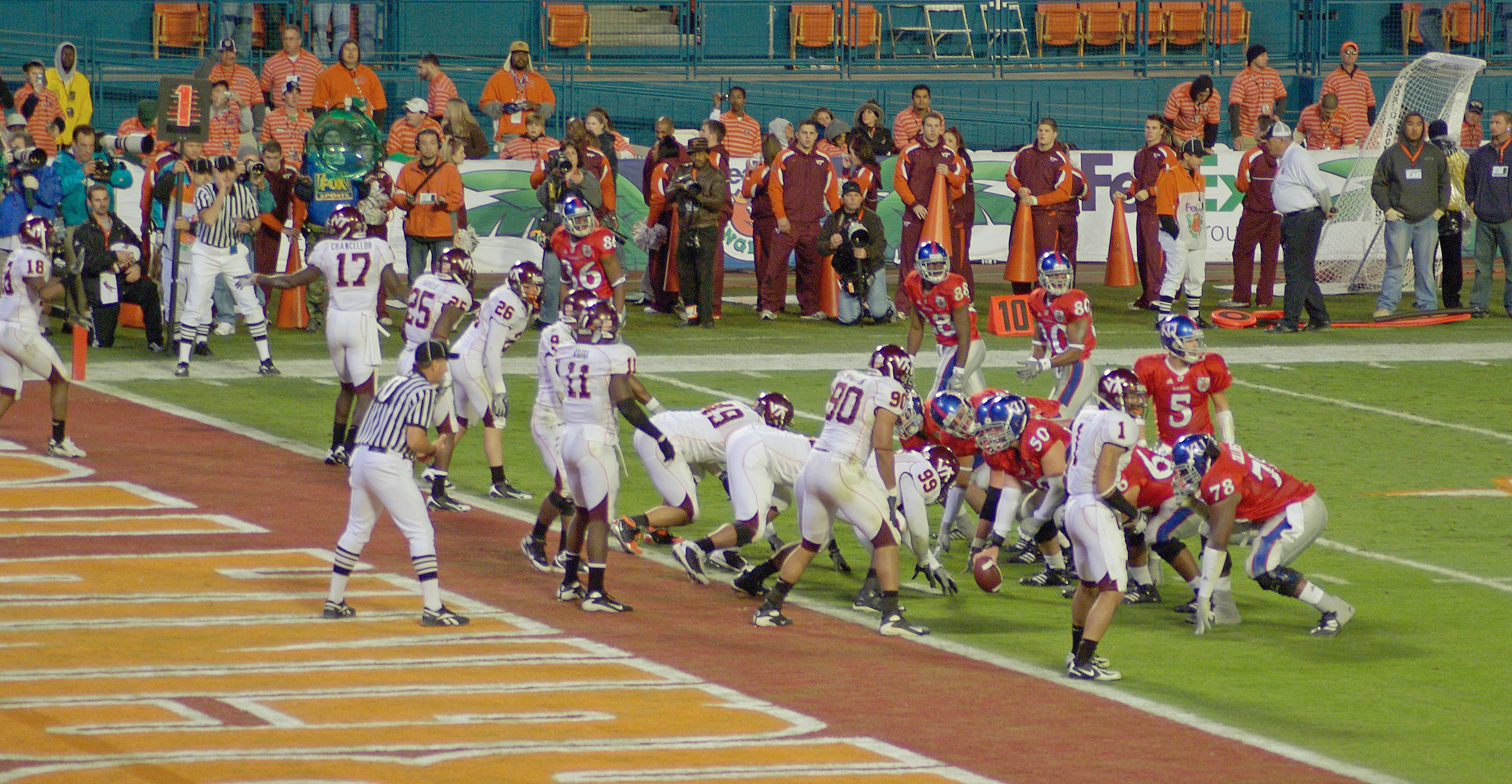
The Jayhawks ready to score against the Hokies in the Orange Bowl.

== Rankings ==
According to the Big 12 Media Preseason Poll, the Jayhawks were projected to finish fourth in the Big 12 Northern Division.

Following their victory over Iowa State, the Jayhawks reached their highest ranking in school history when they were ranked second in the nation in all four major polls (Bowl Championship Series, Associated Press, USA Today and Harris Interactive). Previously, the 1968 team was ranked third by the Associated Press for three weeks.

Entering November, the University of Kansas was the only school with its football team and men's basketball team both ranked in the top ten.

=== Rankings ===
Ranking movements Legend: ██ Increase in ranking ██ Decrease in ranking — = Not ranked RV = Received votes ( ) = First-place votes
| | Week | | | | | | | | | | | | | | | |
| Poll | Pre | 1 | 2 | 3 | 4 | 5 | 6 | 7 | 8 | 9 | 10 | 11 | 12 | 13 | 14 | Final |
|---|---|---|---|---|---|---|---|---|---|---|---|---|---|---|---|---|
| AP | — | RV | RV | RV | RV | RV | 20 | 15 | 12 | 8 | 5 | 4 (1) | 2 (3) | 7 | 8 | 7 (1) |
| Coaches | — | — | — | — | RV | RV | 20 | 15 | 10 | 8 | 5 | 4 (7) | 2 (8) | 5 | 8 | 7 |
| Harris | Not released | | | | RV | RV | 20 | 15 | 11 | 8 | 5 | 4 (8) | 2 (13) | 6 | 8 | Not released |
| BCS | Not released | | | | | | | 13 | 9 | 8 | 4 | 3 | 2 | 5 | 8 | Not released |

== Statistics ==
=== Team ===
| | KU | Opp |
|---|---|---|
| Scoring | 532 | 192 |
| Points per game | 44.3 | 16.0 |
| First downs | 307 | 196 |
| Rushing | 129 | 70 |
| Passing | 157 | 114 |
| Penalty | 21 | 12 |
| Total offense | 5893 | 3819 |
| Avg per play | 6.4 | 4.5 |
| Avg per game | 491.1 | 318.3 |
| Fumbles-Lost | −7 | −12 |
| Penalties-Yards | 48–438 | 77–726 |
| Avg per game | 4.0–36.5 | 6.4–60.5 |

| | KU | Opp |
|---|---|---|
| Punts-Yards | 46-1,699 | |
| Avg per punt | 36.9 | |
| Time of possession/Game | 30:08 | 29:52 |
| 3rd down conversions | 74/170 (43.5%) | 61/194 (31.4%) |
| 4th down conversions | 10/17 (58.8%) | 11/28 (39.3%) |
| Touchdowns scored | 69 | 24 |
| Field goals-Attempts | 17–24 | |
| PAT-Attempts | 63–64 | |
| Total attendance (Games) | 327,491 (7) | |
| Avg per game | 46,784 | |
| Neutral Site | 80,537 (1) | |

== Awards ==
Due to the success of the season, multiple awards were given to the team during the season. Below is a list of awards given. The only awards not provided are Honorable Mention All-Big 12 and weekly awards.

Mark Mangino, coach

- Consensus National Coach of the Year
- Big 12 Coach of the Year

Aqib Talib, CB

- Consensus 1st team All-American
- 1st team All-Big 12

Anthony Collins, T

- 1st team All-American
- 1st team All-Big 12

James McClinton, DT

- 1st team All-Big 12

Joe Mortenson, LB

- 1st team All-Big 12

Todd Reesing, QB

- 2nd team All-Big 12

Brandon McAnderson, FB

- 2nd team All-Big 12

Marcus Henry, WR

- 2nd team All-Big 12

Marcus Herford, WR/KR

- Big 12 Special Teams Player of the Year
- 2nd team All-Big 12
