= List of Fayetteville State Broncos in the NFL draft =

This is a list of Fayetteville State Broncos football players in the NFL draft.

== Key ==
B	Back	K	Kicker	NT	Nose tackle
C	Center	LB	Linebacker	FB	Fullback
DB	Defensive back	P	Punter	HB	Halfback
DE	Defensive end	QB	Quarterback	WR	Wide receiver
DT	Defensive tackle	RB	Running back	G	Guard
E	End	T	Offensive tackle	TE	Tight end

== Selections ==
Year	Round	Pick	Player	Team	Position
1972	17	429	Ken Gamble	New York Jets	K
1976	16	437	James Godwin	New York Jets	RB
2022	4	135	Joshua Williams	Kansas City Chiefs	DB
