= Confessions of Man =

Studio album by The Fifth
- Released: July 28, 2009
- Genre: Hard rock
- Length: 38:02
- Label: Executive Music Group (EMG) / Universal Records

Professional ratings
Review scores
Source	Rating
Away-Team.com	(9/10)

Confessions Of Man is the third release from the rock group The Fifth and their first release with their new record label EMG/Universal Records. The album was originally released in 2008 under Infidel records.

== Release ==
The album consist of ten songs with the only single from the album with a music video is "The Gift (Take It Back)".

=== Track listing ===
No.	Title	Length
1.	"The Gift (Take It Back)"	4:27
2.	"Erase Me"	3:23
3.	"Better Way"	3:42
4.	"One More Day"	4:49
5.	"Dirty Money"	3:39
6.	"Confessions of Man (Title Track)"	3:12
7.	"Broken Mirrors"	3:01
8.	"Burn"	4:07
9.	"Wake Up"	3:51
10.	"Memories of You"	3:51
