= James Ihedigbo =

American football player (born 1983)

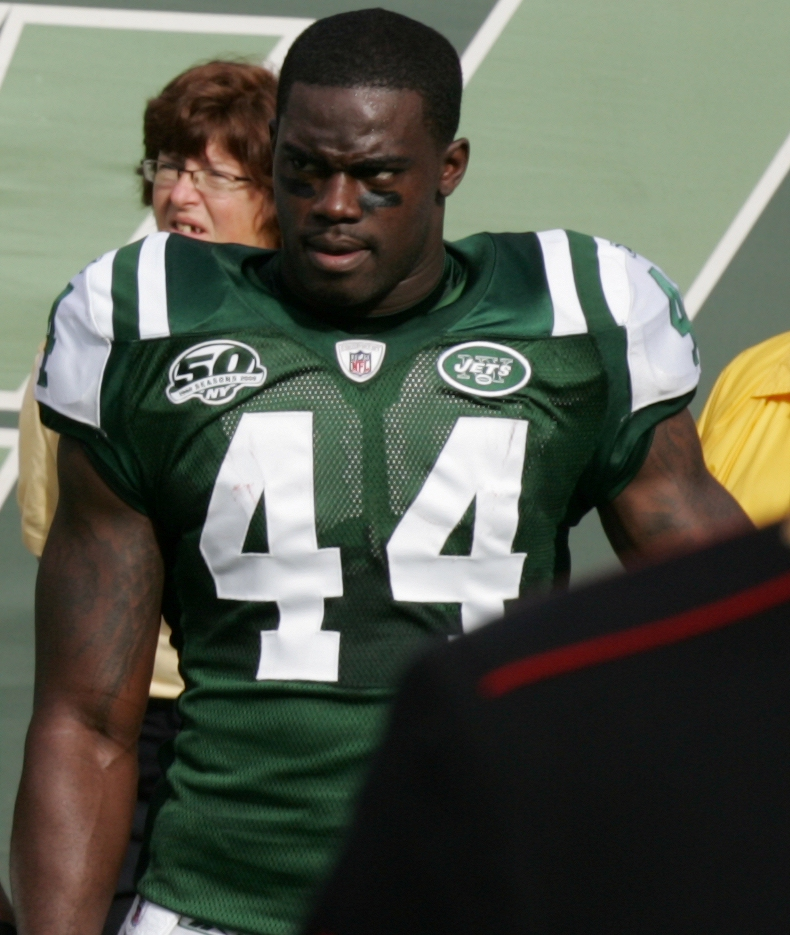
- Ihedigbo with the New York Jets in 2009

No. 44, 32, 27
- Positions: Safety, special teamer

Personal information
- Born: December 3, 1983 (age 42); Northampton, Massachusetts, U.S.
- Listed height: 6 ft 1 in (1.85 m)
- Listed weight: 214 lb (97 kg)

Career information
- High school: Amherst Regional (Amherst, Massachusetts)
- College: Massachusetts (2002–2006)
- NFL draft: 2007: undrafted

Career history
- New York Jets (2007–2010); New England Patriots (2011); Baltimore Ravens (2012–2013); Detroit Lions (2014–2015); Buffalo Bills (2016)

Awards and highlights
- Super Bowl champion (XLVII); Consensus I-AA All-American (2006); First-team All-A-10 (2006); Third-team All-A-10 (2005)

Career NFL statistics
- Total tackles: 394
- Sacks: 9.0
- Forced fumbles: 8
- Fumble recoveries: 4
- Interceptions: 8
- Stats at Pro Football Reference

James Ugochu Ihedigbo (/iːˈhɛdiːboʊ/ ee-HED-ee-boh; born December 3, 1983) is an American former professional football player who was a safety in the National Football League (NFL). He was signed by the New York Jets as an undrafted free agent in 2007. He played college football for the UMass Minutemen.

== Early life ==
Ihedigbo played at Amherst Regional High School where he was a two-time All-Western Massachusetts and All-League selection.

== College career ==
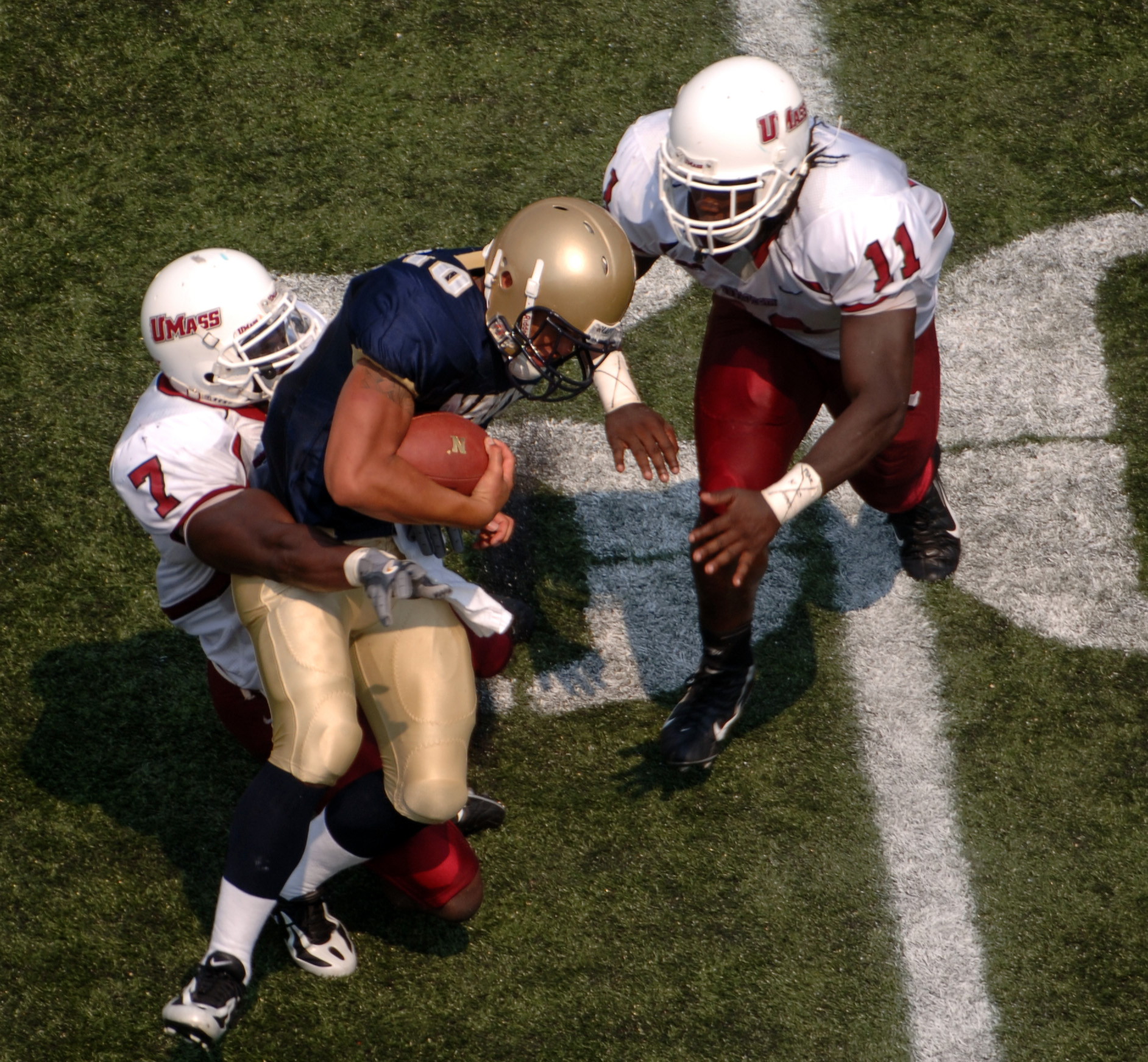
Ihedigbo (left) making a tackle while at UMass.

James Ihedigbo played football at the University of Massachusetts Amherst from 2002–2006. After arriving in 2002, Ihedigbo redshirted his first year. In the following season, he started 10 of 12 games for UMass, picking off 4 passes, making a total of 74 tackles with 2 forced fumbles and was named the team's most improved defensive player. In 2004, James had 52 tackles but no interceptions. In his third year at Massachusetts, Ihedigbo switched to strong safety from free safety and ranked sixth on the team in total tackles with 45. In his redshirt junior year, he was named to the Atlantic 10 conference third-team and started at strong safety for a team which allowed the fewest points in all of Division I-AA football. He finished third in the conference in sacks with 7.5. As a senior, he had 72 tackles, 5 quarterback sacks, 3 interceptions and 4 forced fumbles, he was a candidate for the Buck Buchanan Award and a Walter Camp All-American as well as a senior captain. He was named UMass team MVP for 2006.

== Professional career ==
=== Pre-draft ===
Pre-draft measurables
Height	Weight	40-yard dash	10-yard split	20-yard split	20-yard shuttle	Three-cone drill	Vertical jump	Broad jump	Bench press	Wonderlic
6 ft 0 in (1.83 m)	211 lb (96 kg)	4.77 s	1.64 s	2.77 s	4.24 s	7.12 s	35 in (0.89 m)	9 ft 0 in (2.74 m)	15 reps	-
Results taken from Pro Day workout.

=== New York Jets ===
==== 2007 ====
Ihedigbo attended Jets rookie minicamps and signed a contract with the Jets and general manager Mike Tannenbaum. In the second game of the preseason against the Minnesota Vikings Ihedigbo injured his hand and missed the rest of the season as the Jets placed him on injured reserve.

==== 2008 ====
In 2008, Ihedigbo began the season on the practice squad. He was added to the active roster on October 29, 2008, because of an injury to safety Eric Smith. James Ihedigbo recorded his first NFL tackle on November 23, 2008, against the Tennessee Titans in a 34-13 Jets win. During 2008 season he played in 8 games and had 8 tackles.

==== 2009 ====
Ihedigbo made the Jets in 2009 as a backup safety. In a 16–13 overtime loss to the Buffalo Bills on October 18, 2009, Ihedigbo and fellow Jet Marques Murrell threw punches at Bills tight end Derek Fine, causing Ihedigbo to be ejected from the game by officials. The NFL fined both players $5,000 and head coach Rex Ryan benched Ihedigbo, along with Murrell, for the following game against the Oakland Raiders. On December 13, 2009, against the Tampa Bay Buccaneers Ihedigbo got his first NFL sack on quarterback Josh Freeman. The Jets going into week 17 had 8 wins and 7 losses and needed one win to make the playoffs as they were playing the Cincinnati Bengals. James Ihedigbo had his best game as a pro with 2 tackles. One of those tackles was a sack and a forced fumble of quarterback J. T. O'Sullivan that was recovered by Jamaal Westerman. The Jets won the game 37–0 and clinched a playoff berth. In the AFC wild card playoff game, the Jets beat the Bengals again, 24–14. In the AFC divisional playoff game, the Jets played the San Diego Chargers. In the fourth quarter of the game, Jay Feely was kicking off to San Diego after a Jets touchdown by quarterback Mark Sanchez. The kick return was taken by Antonio Cromartie but during the return Ihedigbo ripped the ball out of his hands for a forced fumble. The Jets went on to win 17–14. The Jets had made it to the AFC championship game and were one win away from the Super Bowl. James Ihedigbo had 3 tackles but the Jets lost to the Indianapolis Colts, 30–17. James Ihedigbo finished the season with 19 tackles, 2 sacks and 1 forced fumble in 15 games.

==== 2010 ====
On March 22, 2010, Ihedigbo signed a one-year contract with the New York Jets. The Jets were considered by many to be Super Bowl contenders. They opened the season on Monday September 13, 2010, against the Baltimore Ravens in the Jets' new home, MetLife Stadium. Ihedigbo recorded his first tackle of the year but the Jets lost 10–9. James Ihedigbo recorded his first sack of the season in week 4 against the Buffalo Bills and quarterback Ryan Fitzpatrick. He finished with two tackles as the Jets won 38 to 14. The Jets were in first place in their division with a 6–2 record going into week 10 against the Cleveland Browns. James had 2 tackles and his second sack of the year in the fourth quarter. The Jets won the game in overtime when Mark Sanchez threw a touchdown pass to Santonio Holmes for the victory. In week 12 The Jets were playing the Cincinnati Bengals on a Thanksgiving game on the NFL Network. Late in the 3rd quarter Steve Weatherford punted a ball that touched one of the Bengals players. Ihedigbo noticed this and jumped on the ball giving the Jets the ball. Later on that drive because of Ihedigbo fumble recovery the Jets scored on a touchdown pass from Mark Sanchez to Santonio Holmes. The Jets won 26–10 and push their record to 9–2. This kept them in first place, tied with the Patriots. The next week the Jets were tied for first place with the New England Patriots and playing their game in New England. James Ihedigbo sacked Tom Brady late in the 1st quarterTom Brady but the Jets struggled all night as the Jets lost 45–3, dropping them out of first place. The Jets ended the season with 11 wins and 5 losses and finished in 2nd place in the AFC East behind the Patriots. The Jets won the AFC wildcard playoff game 17–16 over the Indianapolis Colts. Then in the AFC divisional round the Jets played the New England Patriots. Ihedigbo would have 2 tackles as the Jets would upset the Patriots 28-21 to get to the AFC championship game. Next week the Jets lost to the Pittsburgh Steelers and missed the Super Bowl by one game for the second straight year. James Ihedigbo ended the year with 22 total tackles and 3 sacks.

=== New England Patriots ===
After the NFL lockout ended Ihedigbo became a free agent. The Jets had three free agent safeties: Brodney Pool, Eric Smith, and James Ihedigbo. The Jets decided to sign Pool and Smith and let Ihedigbo go. Ihedigbo signed with the New England Patriots on August 19, 2011. James Ihedigbo got his first tackle with the Patriots in Week 2 against the San Diego Chargers. In his first game against his former team the New York Jets Ihedigbo had a career-high 6 tackles in a New England win 30-21. Two weeks later playing the Pittsburgh Steelers he had eight tackles in one game, which was a career-high for him. Ihedigbo became a starter with the Patriots after a number of other defensive backs were either cut or injured. Prior to the start of the season, Pro Bowl safety Brandon Meriweather as well as fellow starter James Sanders were cut. In Week 10, The Patriots played the Jets again, and Ihedigbo lead the Patriots with seven tackles as New England won 37–16. Through ten games in the 2011 season, Ihedigbo started 6 games and made 42 tackles. At the end of the regular season the Patriots went 13–3 and had the best recorded in the American Football Conference. In the Divisional Round of the playoffs, Ihedigbo had seven tackles in a 45–10 win over the Denver Broncos. The Patriots made the AFC Championship game and played the Baltimore Ravens. James Ihedigbo had eight tackles and a sack in that game. The Patriots would win 23-20. Before the Super Bowl, Coach Bill Belichick said that James Ihedigbo would start at safety in the Super Bowl. James Ihedigbo started the game and made five tackles but the New England Patriots would lose to the New York Giants 21-17. Ihedigbo played all 16 game in 2011, starting in 12 of them. He had a career-high in tackles with 69. His 69 tackles was the 5th best on the Patriots for that season. Ihedigbo was re-signed June 22, 2012. He was released after the end of the 2012 NFL preseason, on August 31, 2012.

=== Baltimore Ravens ===
==== 2012 ====
On September 2, 2012, Ihedigbo signed with the Baltimore Ravens. In his first game as a Raven, Ihedigbo recorded two tackles in a win over the Cincinnati Bengals. In week 3 of the 2012 NFL season, the Ravens played the New England Patriots, the team that had released Ihedigbo at the beginning of the season. Ihedigbo played in the game but mostly on special teams. The Ravens won 31–30 to increase their record to 2–1. After the game Ihedigbo said "Anytime you get a chance to go against your former team, it's kind of personal". "I went into this game with that kind of mentality and when you put the history of these two teams on top of it, it just became a very personal and emotional thing. It was great the way it turned out. It couldn't be any sweeter. We just persevered through everything, all adversity that took place in the game from the things that were in our control, the penalties and the things that were outside our control," Ihedigbo said. "When it all accumulates in a win, we're very excited." The Ravens faced the Patriots again in the AFC Championship, the fourth season in a row that Ihedigbo played in the AFC Championship. The Ravens beat the Patriots 28-13, and qualified for the Super Bowl for the first time in 12 years. The Ravens defeated the San Francisco 49ers, 34–31, in Super Bowl XLVII.

==== 2013 ====
On March 12, 2013, it was announced that the Baltimore Ravens re-signed James Ihedigbo to a one-year contract. At the end of the 2013 pre-season coach John Harbaugh announced that Ihedigbo would start at safety in week 1 for the Ravens. In the second quarter in a game versus the Cincinnati Bengals, Ihedigbo got his first career interception from Bengals quarterback Andy Dalton. Later in the 4th quarter of the same game, Ihedigbo intercepted Dalton again. He also recorded 9 tackles.

=== Detroit Lions ===
On March 24, 2014, Ihedigbo signed a two-year contract with the Detroit Lions. Ihedigbo was considered a potential weak link in pass defense on a strong Lions defense, which finished the season third in total points allowed and first in run defense. He was having a strong season and seemingly had proven the doubters wrong until the second last game of the season when he was benched. He regained his starting role before the season ended, but was benched again in the playoffs after allowing two touchdown passes in the Lions 24-20 playoff defeat to the Dallas Cowboys, ending a disappointing season.

Following the 2014 season Idedigbo held out for a contract increase, but was unsuccessful, and returned to training camp without any modifications to his contract.

=== Buffalo Bills ===
On November 15, 2016, Ihedigbo was signed by the Buffalo Bills. He was placed on injured reserve on December 13, 2016, with an ankle injury.

Ihedigbo announced his retirement from the NFL on March 19, 2018.

== NFL career statistics ==
Legend
**Bold**	Career high

=== Regular season ===
Year	Team	Games		Tackles					Interceptions					Fumbles			
Year	Team	GP	GS	Cmb	Solo	Ast	Sck	TFL	Int	Yds	TD	Lng	PD	FF	FR	Yds	TD
2008	NYJ	8	0	8	3	5	0.0	0	0	0	0	0	0	0	0	0	0
2009	NYJ	15	0	19	12	7	2.0	1	0	0	0	0	0	1	0	0	0
2010	NYJ	14	0	22	21	1	**3.0**	4	0	0	0	0	0	0	1	0	0
2011	NWE	**16**	12	69	46	23	0.0	2	0	0	0	0	1	0	0	0	0
2012	BAL	**16**	3	25	18	7	1.0	4	0	0	0	0	1	0	0	0	0
2013	BAL	**16**	**16**	**101**	**63**	**38**	0.0	5	3	54	0	37	**11**	1	**2**	0	0
2014	DET	13	13	71	59	12	2.0	**6**	**4**	**86**	0	**70**	8	**3**	1	0	0
2015	DET	15	8	63	47	16	1.0	3	1	0	0	0	2	**3**	0	0	0
2016	BUF	4	3	16	10	6	0.0	1	0	0	0	0	1	0	0	0	0
		117	55	394	279	115	9.0	26	8	140	0	70	24	8	4	0	0

=== Playoffs ===
Year	Team	Games		Tackles					Interceptions					Fumbles			
Year	Team	GP	GS	Cmb	Solo	Ast	Sck	TFL	Int	Yds	TD	Lng	PD	FF	FR	Yds	TD
2009	NYJ	3	0	11	**9**	2	0.0	0	0	0	0	0	0	**2**	0	0	0
2010	NYJ	3	0	3	2	1	0.0	0	0	0	0	0	0	0	0	0	0
2011	NWE	3	**3**	**20**	**9**	**11**	**1.0**	**2**	0	0	0	0	0	0	0	0	0
2012	BAL	**4**	0	2	2	0	0.0	0	0	0	0	0	0	0	0	0	0
2014	DET	1	1	9	7	2	**1.0**	1	0	0	0	0	0	0	0	0	0
		14	4	45	29	16	2.0	3	0	0	0	0	0	2	0	0	0

== Personal life ==
Ihedigbo was born to Dr. Rose and Apollos F. Ihedigbo, immigrants from Nigeria. Ihedigbo has three other brothers, Emeka, Nate, David and a sister, Onyii.

=== Philanthropy ===
Ihedigbo founded the HOPE Africa Foundation in 2008 to help provide educational services for underprivileged communities in Africa. The foundation offers a wealth of assistance to these communities in the form of scholarships, mentoring, funding, and developmental projects.

Ihedigbo is also involved in the Nigerian Agricultural Technical Community College, founded by his parents.
