= Brandon Ghee =

American football player (born 1987)

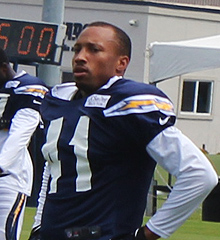
- Ghee during the Chargers' training camp in 2014

No. 21, 38
- Position: Cornerback

Personal information
- Born: June 6, 1987 (age 39); Wiesbaden, Germany
- Listed height: 6 ft 0 in (1.83 m)
- Listed weight: 200 lb (91 kg)

Career information
- High school: Jack Britt (Fayetteville, North Carolina, U.S.)
- College: Wake Forest
- NFL draft: 2010: 3rd round, 96th overall pick

Career history
- Cincinnati Bengals (2010–2013); San Diego Chargers (2014)*; Tennessee Titans (2014); Cincinnati Bengals (2015)*
- * Offseason or practice squad member only

Career NFL statistics
- Total tackles: 21
- Pass deflections: 6
- Interceptions: 1
- Stats at Pro Football Reference

Brandon Ghee (born June 6, 1987) is a former professional football cornerback. He was selected by the Cincinnati Bengals in the third round (96th overall) of the 2010 NFL draft, and also played for the Tennessee Titans. He played college football at Wake Forest.

== Early life ==
Ghee attended Jack Britt High School in Fayetteville, North Carolina, where he was named all-state as a cornerback and all-region as a wide receiver. He also helped Jack Britt to the state championship game and scored two touchdowns in that contest.

Considered a three-star recruit by Rivals.com, Ghee was listed as the No. 28 cornerback prospect in the nation in 2005. He chose Wake Forest over offers from Clemson, North Carolina, Tennessee and Virginia Tech.

== College career ==
Ghee redshirted his initial season at Wake Forest, and did not participate in any team activities the following season because of academic reasons.

In 2007, he started each of the final 10 games and ranked fourth on the squad with 56 tackles. He also had 10 pass breakups, the second-most on the team.

As a redshirt junior in 2008, Ghee played in 11 games and finished second in the ACC in fumbles forced with four.

== Professional career ==
=== Cincinnati Bengals (first stint) ===
Ghee was selected by the Cincinnati Bengals in the third round of the 2010 NFL draft with the 96th overall pick. He was placed on injured reserve with a wrist injury on August 24, 2012.

=== San Diego Chargers ===
He signed a two-year deal with the San Diego Chargers on March 13, 2014.

=== Tennessee Titans ===
Ghee signed with the Tennessee Titans on October 8, 2014. He was waived on December 3, 2014.

=== Cincinnati Bengals (second stint) ===
Ghee signed with the Bengals on March 19, 2015. He was released by the Bengals on September 5, 2015.

== Personal life ==
His brother, Patrick Ghee, played safety at Wake Forest from 2002 to 2006.
