= Chris Hubert =

American football player (born 1993)

No. 19
- Position: Wide receiver

Personal information
- Born: May 8, 1993 (age 33); Raleigh, North Carolina, U.S.
- Listed height: 5 ft 9 in (1.75 m)
- Listed weight: 170 lb (77 kg)

Career information
- High school: Cary (NC) Middle Creek
- College: Fayetteville State
- NFL draft: 2016: undrafted

Career history
- Arizona Cardinals (2016)

Career NFL statistics
- Games played: 0
- Games started: 0
- Stats at Pro Football Reference

Chris Hubert (born May 8, 1993) is an American former football wide receiver. He played college football at Fayetteville State University. Hubert was signed by the Arizona Cardinals of the National Football League (NFL) as an undrafted free agent in 2016.

== Professional career ==
Pre-draft measurables
Height	Weight	40-yard dash	10-yard split	20-yard split	20-yard shuttle	Three-cone drill	Vertical jump	Broad jump	Bench press
5 ft 9 in (1.75 m)	170 lb (77 kg)	4.71 s	1.60 s	2.70 s	4.34 s	7.36 s	34 in (0.86 m)	9 ft 11 in (3.02 m)	8 reps
All values are from Pro Day

After going undrafted in the 2016 NFL draft, Hubert signed with the Arizona Cardinals on May 9, 2016. On September 3, 2016, he was waived and was signed to the practice squad on September 12, 2016. On October 26, 2016, he was promoted from the practice squad to active roster. On January 3, 2017, Hubert signed a future contract with the Cardinals.

On May 10, 2017, he was released by the Cardinals. He was re-signed on June 6, 2017. He was waived on September 2, 2017.
