= Middle Creek High School =

Public school in Cary, North Carolina US

Coordinates: 35°40′00″N 78°45′39″W

- 123 Middle Creek Park Avenue; Apex, North Carolina 27539; United States

Information
- Type: Public
- Established: 2002 (24 years ago)
- School district: Wake County Public School System
- NCES District ID: 3704720
- CEEB code: 340086
- NCES School ID: 370472002653
- Principal: Scott Munsie
- Staff: 87.11 (FTE)
- Grades: 9 - 12
- Enrollment: 1,587 (2024-2025)
- Student to teacher ratio: 18.22
- Colors: Red, black, and white
- Athletics: NCHSAA 6A
- Athletics conference: Triangle Six 6A/7A
- Mascot: Mustang
- Newspaper: The Creek Flow
- Website: Middle Creek High School

Middle Creek High School is located at 123 Middle Creek Park Avenue of Cary, North Carolina, with a mailing address of Apex. It is one of six public high schools in Cary and is part of the Wake County Public School System.

== History ==
Middle Creek High School opened on August 26, 2002. However, the previous year, Athens Drive High School used the school building while it was being remodeled. The school opened with juniors and seniors, adding freshmen and sophomores the next year.

== Student Population ==
In the 2021-2022 school year, the student enrollment was 1,886. The student population is 52% male and 48% female. The student body is 58.7% White, 21.2% Hispanic, 14.5% Black, 3% two or more races, 2.3% Asian, .2% American Indian, and .1% Hawaiian/Pacific Islander—for a total minority population of 41.3%.

Of those students, 20% are economically disadvantaged with 17% eligible for the free lunch program and 3% of eligible for the reduced-price lunch program.

The student graduation rate is 94%. Based on test scores, 50.2% of the students are ready for college.

== Faculty ==
The faculty consists of 103.74 full-time equivalent teachers. The ratio of students to teachers is 18:1. 99% of the teachers have three or more years of experience. In addition 95% of teachers are certified.

There is one counselor for every 285 students or a ratio of 285:1. The faculty also includes a social worker.

== Academics ==
=== Curriculum ===
Middle Creek High School includes grades 9 through 12. The school offers Advanced Placement® courses, with 62% of students participating. In addition, 61% of the students passed at least one AP® Exam. 59% of the school's students take the SAT, with an average score of 1160. However 73% of the school's graduates pursue either college or vocational training.

=== Rankings ===
As of 2022, U.S. News & World Report ranks Middle Creek High School 12th amongst the high schools in Wake County, North Carolina. It is also ranked 76th in North Carolina, and 2,780th in the nation. Niche gives the school an "A" rating and places the school at #57 in North Carolina.

=== Academic honors ===
Juniors and seniors with a qualifying GPA can apply to join the National Honor Society.

=== Library ===
The school's media center has a staff of two.

== Student life ==
=== Publications ===
The online student newspaper is called The Creek Flow. The school also publishes a yearbook.

== Athletics ==
=== Mascot ===
Middle Creek High School's mascot is the Mustang.

=== School Colors ===
The school colors are black, red, and white.

=== Sports teams ===
Middle Creek High School has the following co-ed sports teams: varsity cheerleading, junior varsity cheerleading, cross country, indoor track, swim, and track.

Sports teams for women include varsity basketball, junior varsity basketball, junior varsity cheerleading, varsity cheerleading, golf, gymnastics, varsity lacrosse, junior varsity lacrosse, varsity soccer, junior varsity soccer, varsity softball, junior varsity softball, stunt, swimming, varsity tennis, varsity volleyball, junior varsity volleyball, and wrestling.

Men's sports teams include: varsity baseball, junior varsity baseball, varsity basketball, junior varsity basketball, varsity football, junior varsity football, golf, varsity lacrosse, junior varsity lacrosse, varsity soccer, junior varsity soccer, swimming, varsity tennis, and wrestling.

=== State championships ===
- 2012, 2017, & 2022 4A State Men's Lacrosse Champions
- 2012 & 2023 4A State Baseball Champions
- Cheerleading 5 state championships, 4 national championships
- 2023 4A State Volleyball Champions

=== Hall of Fame ===
In 2013, the first class was inducted into the Middle Creek School Athletic Hall of Fame. Candidates for inclusion are alumni athletes, athletic trainers, coaches, community members, school officials, or Stampede Club members.

== Notable alumni ==
- Josh Banks, football defensive lineman
- Chris Hubert, football wide receiver
- Dareke Young, NFL wide receiver, Super Bowl LX champion with the Seattle Seahawks
