= South View High School =

American public school in North Carolina

Location
- 4184 Elk Road; Hope Mills, North Carolina 28348; United States; 34°58′43″N 78°55′39″W

Information
- Type: Public
- Established: 1972 (54 years ago)
- School district: Cumberland County Schools
- CEEB code: 341900
- Principal: Phyllis Jackson
- Teaching staff: 95.43 (FTE)
- Grades: 9–12
- Enrollment: 1,714 (2017–18)
- Student to teacher ratio: 17.96
- Schedule type: Block (4x4)
- Colors: Orange and black
- Athletics conference: 5A-6A Eastern Sandhills
- Mascot: Tiger
- Feeder schools: South View Middle, Hope Mills Middle
- Website: svhs.ccs.k12.nc.us

South View High School is a 9–12 public high school in Hope Mills, North Carolina, United States. It is a member of Cumberland County Schools (CSS). Adjacent to South View High School is South View Middle School. Enrollment of students is approximately 1900, placing the school under the NCHSAA 4A classification.

== Academic programs ==
Academic programs in the school include the International Baccalaureate Academy and the Academy of Public Safety and Security. The principal is Phyllis Jackson.

== Athletics ==
- Basketball
- Wrestling
- Football
- Soccer
- Volleyball
- Baseball
- Golf
- Softball
- Track and field
- Swimming

== Notable alumni ==
- Garry Battle, professional football player
- Jeff Capel, former basketball player at Duke University and now college coach
- Jeremy Cox, professional football player
- Charles Kirby, professional football player
