= Dareke Young =

American football player (born 1999)

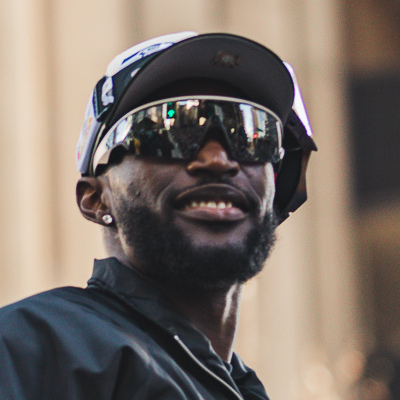
- Young at the Super Bowl LX victory parade

No. 81 – Las Vegas Raiders
- Positions: Wide receiver, kickoff returner
- Roster status: Active

Personal information
- Born: June 4, 1999 (age 27); Raleigh, North Carolina, U.S.
- Listed height: 6 ft 2 in (1.88 m)
- Listed weight: 224 lb (102 kg)

Career information
- High school: Middle Creek (Cary, North Carolina)
- College: Lenoir–Rhyne (2017–2021)
- NFL draft: 2022: 7th round, 233rd overall pick

Career history
- Seattle Seahawks (2022–2025); Las Vegas Raiders (2026–present)

Awards and highlights
- Super Bowl champion (LX)

Career NFL statistics as of 2025
- Receptions: 4
- Receiving yards: 72
- Return yards: 322
- Stats at Pro Football Reference

Dareke Young (born June 4, 1999) is an American professional football wide receiver and kickoff returner for the Las Vegas Raiders of the National Football League (NFL). He played college football for the Lenoir–Rhyne Bears and was selected by the Seattle Seahawks in the seventh round of the 2022 NFL draft.

== Early life ==
Dareke Young was raised in Raleigh, North Carolina, and attended Middle Creek High School. He later attended college at Lenior-Rhyne University. Although he played collegiate football, his mother said that the possibility of playing in the NFL didn't seem like a real option until his junior year of college.

== College career ==
Young played collegiate football at Lenior-Rhyne from 2017-2021. Over the course of his 4 years, he compiled 59 total receptions for 958 yards and 14 touchdowns. He also contributed as a rusher, tallying 87 carries for 653 yards and 8 touchdowns. In 2021, he was named part of the All-South Atlantic Conference Second Team.

== Professional career ==
Prior to the 2022 NFL Draft, Young participated in the Draft Combine. After the combine, it was deemed that with his good size and strength, he had the potential to be a useful player in the NFL. However, he had a long way to go due to his poor route running and skills.

=== Seattle Seahawks ===
Young was selected by the Seattle Seahawks in the seventh round, 233rd overall, of the 2022 NFL draft. He played in 13 games as a rookie primarily on special teams, but had two catches for 24 yards on the season.

On September 4, 2023, Young was placed on injured reserve. He was activated on November 11. In the 2023 season, he appeared in six games in mainly a special teams role. In the 2024 season, he continued to contribute mainly on special teams.

Young began the 2025 season as one of Seattle's auxiliary wide receivers. He was placed on injured reserve due to a quad injury on November 8, 2025. Young was activated on December 18, ahead of the team's Week 16 matchup against the Los Angeles Rams. Young recovered a crucial muffed punt by Xavier Smith in the NFC Championship Game against the Rams, eventually resulting in a 31–27 victory. Young eventually won Super Bowl LX with the Seahawks when they defeated the New England Patriots 29–13. He recorded a tackle in the game.

=== Las Vegas Raiders ===
On March 13, 2026, Young signed with the Las Vegas Raiders.

Pre-draft measurables
| Height | Weight | Arm length | Hand span | Wingspan | 40-yard dash | 10-yard split | 20-yard split | 20-yard shuttle | Three-cone drill | Vertical jump | Broad jump | Bench press |
|---|---|---|---|---|---|---|---|---|---|---|---|---|
| 6 ft 2 in (1.88 m) | 223 lb (101 kg) | 32 5/8 in (0.83 m) | 10 1/8 in (0.26 m) | 6 ft 7 1/2 in (2.02 m) | 4.44 s | 1.54 s | 2.53 s | 4.19 s | 6.88 s | 37.0 in (0.94 m) | 11 ft 3 in (3.43 m) | 22 reps |
All values from Pro Day

== NFL career statistics ==
Legend
| | Won the Super Bowl |
| **Bold** | Career High |

=== Regular season ===
| Year | Team | Games | | Receiving | | | | | Kick returns | | | | |
| Year | Team | GP | GS | Rec | Yds | Avg | Lng | TD | Ret | Yds | Avg | Lng | TD |
|---|---|---|---|---|---|---|---|---|---|---|---|---|---|
| 2022 | SEA | 13 | 0 | **2** | 24 | 12.0 | 12 | 0 | 0 | 0 | 0.0 | 0 | 0 |
| 2023 | SEA | 6 | 0 | 0 | 0 | 0.0 | 0 | 0 | 0 | 0 | 0.0 | 0 | 0 |
| 2024 | SEA | **14** | 0 | 0 | 0 | 0.0 | 0 | 0 | 0 | 0 | 0.0 | 0 | 0 |
| 2025 | SEA | 9 | 0 | **2** | **48** | **24.0** | **36** | 0 | **10** | **322** | **32.2** | **60** | 0 |
| Career | | 42 | 0 | 4 | 72 | 18.0 | 36 | 0 | 10 | 322 | 32.2 | 60 | 0 |

=== Postseason ===
| Year | Team | Games | | Receiving | | | | |
| Year | Team | GP | GS | Rec | Yds | Avg | Lng | TD |
|---|---|---|---|---|---|---|---|---|
| 2022 | SEA | 1 | 0 | **1** | **11** | **11.0** | **11** | 0 |
| 2025 | SEA | **3** | 0 | 0 | 0 | 0.0 | 0 | 0 |
| Career | | 4 | 0 | 1 | 11 | 11.0 | 11 | 0 |
