= Jack Britt High School =

American public school in North Carolina

Location
- 7403 Rockfish Road; Fayetteville, North Carolina 28306; United States; 34°58′39″N 79°0′43″W

Information
- Type: Public
- Established: 2000 (26 years ago)
- School district: Cumberland County Schools
- NCES District ID: 3700011
- CEEB code: 341323
- NCES School ID: 370001102512
- Principal: Scott Pope
- Staff: 98.82 (FTE)
- Grades: 9–12
- Enrollment: 1,916 (2023–2024)
- Student to teacher ratio: 19.39
- Colors: Purple and gold
- Athletics: NCHSAA 7A
- Athletics conference: Mid-South 7A/8A
- Team name: Buccaneer
- Feeder schools: John Griffin Middle, New Century International Middle
- Website: jbhs.ccs.k12.nc.us

Jack Britt High School is a public high school located in southern Cumberland County, North Carolina. It is attended by approximately 2,000 students in grades nine through twelve. The school is a 2018 Winner of U.S. News & World Report Best High Schools Silver Medal.

== Integrated Systems Technology Academy ==
Jack Britt, like many other schools in Cumberland County, has an academy (a special program of study that focuses a student's education on a specific subject). The Integrated Systems Technology Academy of Engineering provides students with the opportunity to study and learn technical design, as well as engineering concepts like drafting, physics, design implementation, and imageboard creation.

== Athletics ==
Jack Britt is a member of the North Carolina High School Athletic Association (NCHSAA) and are classified as a 7A school. They are a part of the Mid-South 7A/8A Conference. Jack Britt offers the following sports below for students:

- Baseball
- Basketball
- Bowling
- Cheerleading
- Cross Country
- Football
- Golf
- Lacrosse
- Soccer
- Softball
- Swimming
- Tennis
- Indoor Track and Field
- Track and Field
- Volleyball
- Wrestling

=== Sporting achievements ===
Jack Britt won the NCHSAA 4A fast pitch softball state championship in 2018, making them the first and only Cumberland County team to win a 4A fast pitch softball state title.

The Jack Britt boys and girls wrestling teams have both won North Carolina state championships. The boys wrestling team were the NCHSAA 4A dual team and state tournament team champions in 2015. The girls team were the NCHSAA all classifications state tournament team champions in 2025.

== School awards and distinctions ==
Jack Britt won the 2009–2010 U.S. News & World Report America's Best High Schools Bronze Medal.

Honored as NCHSAA Exemplary School, Jack Britt was commended for its overall program, including athletic opportunities, community interest and involvement, and academics.

In 2010, Jack Britt won the Educational Trust's Dispelling the Myth Award, which recognizes outstanding work in narrowing achievement gaps between student groups, exceeding state standards, and rapidly improving student learning.

Jack Britt won the 2010–2011 North Carolina Honor School of Excellence.

In 2013, Jack Britt's Marching Band, The Pride of Jack Britt, attended the USBands National Championships at MetLife Stadium winning the Dinkles Spirit of Band Award.

== Notable alumni ==
- Heather Erickson — Paralympic sitting volleyball player
- John Fields — basketball player
- JaMeesia Ford — track and field athlete
- Brandon Ghee — NFL cornerback
- Marques Murrell — NFL linebacker and two-time NCAA Division I-AA/FCS national champion at Appalachian State
- Xavier Nixon — NFL offensive tackle
- Fionnghuala O'Reilly — Miss Universe Ireland 2019
- Sammy Sullivan — American rugby sevens player, Olympic bronze medalist in women's rugby sevens at 2024 Summer Olympics
- C. J. Williams — basketball player in the Israeli Basketball Premier League
- Jordan Williams — Canadian Football League linebacker, first overall pick in the 2020 CFL draft
- Joshua Williams — NFL cornerback, two-time Super Bowl champion with the Kansas City Chiefs
- Christian Worley — civil rights activist
