= Jalen Seegars =

American basketball player

No. 11 – APOP Paphos
- Position: Guard
- League: Cypriot League

Personal information
- Born: High Point, North Carolina, U.S.
- Listed height: 6 ft 5 in (1.96 m)
- Listed weight: 215 lb (98 kg)

Career information
- High school: High Point Christian Academy (High Point, North Carolina)
- College: UNC Asheville (2017–2019); Fayetteville State (2019–2022)
- NBA draft: 2022: undrafted

Career history
- 2022–present: APOP Paphos

Career highlights
- 2× First-team All-CIAA (2020, 2022); CIAA Tournament MVP (2022)

Jalen Seegars is an American professional basketball player for APOP Paphos of the Cypriot League.

== High school career ==
During his high school stint, Seegars were teammates with Bam Adebayo, who would go on to become a player for the Miami Heat of the NBA.

== Collegiate career ==
=== UNC Asheville (2017–2019) ===
After high school, Seegars committed to play for UNC Asheville as he chose the same university as his tertiary school. He formally signed to play on June 1, 2017. In just his second collegiate game, he scored 10 points and grabbed 4 rebounds in a 92–60 victory over Lees–McRae.

=== Fayetteville State (2019–present) ===
After two years at UNC Asheville, Seegars transferred to Fayetteville State University to continue his studies and his collegiate career, and immediately, he made an impact on the court to lead the Broncos into its winning ways.

On December 19, 2019, Seegars scored a collegiate-high of 39 points in an overtime victory over the Lincoln Lions.

On February 26, 2022, Seegars scored 15 points to help Fayetteville State clinch the 2022 CIAA Tournament championship game and subsequently, he was awarded the MVP of the said game.

== Career statistics ==
=== College ===
Year	Team	GP	GS	MPG	FG%	3P%	FT%	RPG	APG	SPG	BPG	PPG
2017–18	UNC Asheville Bulldogs	19	19	11.9	.417	.294	.591	1.2	.6	.3	.3	2.5
2018–19	UNC Asheville Bulldogs	29	29	20.9	.382	.356	.714	3.4	.6	.7	.8	4.5
2019–20	Fayetteville State Broncos	30	30	30.6	.434	.398	.742	6.1	1.1	.4	1.4	15.3
2021–22	Fayetteville State Broncos	30	30	32.9	.425	.383	.692	5.4	1.1	.8	1.2	16.2
