= Cumberland County Schools =

School district in North Carolina, US

Address
- 2465 Gillespie Street Fayetteville, North Carolina, 28306; United States

District information
- Type: Public
- Grades: PK–13
- Schools: 86
- NCES District ID: 3700011

Students and staff
- Students: 49,002 (2025–2026)
- Teachers: 2,923.67 (on an FTE basis) (2025–2026)
- Staff: 175.70 (on an FTE basis) (2025–2026)
- Student–teacher ratio: 16.76 (2025–2026)

Other information
- Website: www.ccs.k12.nc.us

Cumberland County Schools (CCS) is a school district encompassing the entirety of Cumberland County, North Carolina, United States.

Cumberland County Schools' headquarters are located in Fayetteville, North Carolina. Cumberland County Schools has schools located in all cities and towns of Cumberland County. Cumberland County Schools is the 4th largest school system in the state and 78 in the country. The district serves most areas for grades PK-12. The Department of Defense Education Activity (DoDEA) operates public schools on Fort Bragg for PK-8, but for high school Fort Bragg students attend local public schools in their respective counties.

== Student enrollment ==
Cumberland County Schools has a total of 53,000 enrolled students, including 1000 preschool students, 24,000 elementary students, 12,000 middle school students, and 16,000 high school students. The district employs 3,500 teachers and a total of 6,800 employees.

About half of the students in the district are Black, with about 40% White, and all other races making up less than 10% of enrollment.

Cumberland County Schools is broken into 10 attendance areas, although as a "school of choice", school system, students may attend any school in a district that offers the program, so long as they have transportation to and from school and are approved through an application process. Students from Hope Mills may attend Grays Creek High School, even if they live in the South View High School District, so long as they provide their own transportation.

== Schools ==
=== High Schools ===
- A.B. Wilkins High School, Fayetteville
- Cape Fear High School, Vander
- Cross Creek Early College High School, Fayetteville
- Cumberland Academy 6-12, Fayetteville
- Cumberland International Early College High School, Fayetteville
- Cumberland Polytechnic High School, Fayetteville
- Douglas Byrd High School, Fayetteville
- E. E. Smith High School, Fayetteville
- Gray's Creek High School, Hope Mills
- Jack Britt High School, Fayetteville
- Massey Hill Classical High School, Fayetteville
- Pine Forest High School, Fayetteville
- Paulina Jones High School, Fayetteville
- Reid Ross Classical Middle/High School, Fayetteville
- Seventy-First High School, Fayetteville
- South View High School, Hope Mills
- Terry Sanford High School, Fayetteville
- Westover High School, Fayetteville

=== Middle Schools ===
- Anne Chestnutt Middle School, Fayetteville
- Cumberland Academy 6-12, Fayetteville
- Douglas Byrd Middle School, Fayetteville
- Gray's Creek Middle School, Hope Mills
- Hope Mills Middle School, Hope Mills
- Howard Learning Academy, Fayetteville
- John R. Griffin Middle School, Fayetteville
- Lewis Chapel Middle School, Fayetteville
- Luther Jeralds Middle School, Fayetteville
- Mac Williams Middle School, Fayetteville
- Max Abbott Middle School, Fayetteville
- New Century International Middle School, Fayetteville
- Pine Forest Middle School, Fayetteville
- Reid Ross Classical Middle/High School, Fayetteville
- Seventy-First Classical Middle School, Fayetteville
- South View Middle School, Hope Mills
- Spring Lake Middle School, Spring Lake
- Westover Middle School, Fayetteville

=== Elementary Schools ===
- Alderman Road Elementary School, Fayetteville
- Armstrong Elementary School, Eastover
- Ashley Elementary School, Fayetteville
- Beaver Dam Elementary School, Roseboro
- Ben Martin Elementary School, Fayetteville
- Bill Hefner Elementary School, Fayetteville
- Brentwood Elementary School, Fayetteville
- C. Wayne Collier Elementary School, Hope Mills
- Cliffdale Elementary School, Fayetteville
- College Lakes Elementary School, Fayetteville
- Cumberland Academy K-5, Fayetteville
- Cumberland Mills Elementary School, Fayetteville
- Cumberland Road Elementary School, Fayetteville
- District 7 Elementary School, Wade
- E.E. Miller Elementary School, Fayetteville
- E. Melvin Honeycutt Elementary School, Fayetteville
- Ed V. Baldwin Elementary School, Hope Mills
- Eastover-Central Elementary School, Eastover
- Elizabeth Cashwell Elementary School, Fayetteville
- Ferguson-Easley Elementary School, Fayetteville
- Gallberry Farm Elementary School, Hope Mills
- Glendale Acres Elementary School, Fayetteville
- Gray's Creek Elementary School, Fayetteville
- Howard Hall Elementary School, Fayetteville
- J.W. Seabrook Elementary School, Fayetteville
- Lake Rim Elementary School, Fayetteville
- Long Hill Elementary School, Fayetteville
- Loyd Auman Elementary School, Fayetteville
- Lucile Souders Elementary School, Fayetteville
- Margaret Willis Elementary School, Fayetteville
- Mary McArthur Elementary School, Fayetteville
- Montclair Elementary School, Fayetteville
- Morganton Road Elementary School, Fayetteville
- New Century International Elementary School, Fayetteville
- Ponderosa Elementary School, Fayetteville
- Raleigh Road Elementary School, Linden
- Rockfish Elementary School, Hope Mills
- Sherwood Park Elementary School, Fayetteville
- Stedman Elementary School, Stedman
- Stoney Point Elementary School, Fayetteville
- Sunnyside Elementary School, Fayetteville
- Vanstory Hills Elementary School, Fayetteville
- William H. Owen Elementary School, Fayetteville
- W.T. Brown Elementary School, Spring Lake
- Walker-Spivey Elementary School, Fayetteville
- Warrenwood Elementary School, Fayetteville
- Westarea Elementary School, Fayetteville

=== Primary Schools ===
- Alma Easom Primary School, Fayetteville
- Stedman Primary School, Stedman
