= Garry Battle =

American football player (born 1985)

Profile
- Position: Guard

Personal information
- Born: September 17, 1985 (age 41); Fayetteville, North Carolina, U.S.
- Listed height: 6 ft 2 in (1.88 m)
- Listed weight: 310 lb (141 kg)

Career information
- High school: South View (Hope Mills, North Carolina)
- College: Fayetteville State
- NFL draft: 2008: undrafted

Career history
- Fayetteville Guard (2008–2009); Dallas Vigilantes (2010); Tulsa Talons (2010)

Awards and highlights
- First-team Division II All-CIAA (2007)
- Stats at ArenaFan.com

Garry Battle (born September 17, 1985) is a former professional Arena football offensive and defensive lineman.

== Early life ==
Battle attended South View High School in Hope Mills, North Carolina. Where he lettered in basketball and football for two years. In his senior football season he was named to the All-Conference (4AA Two-Rivers) first team.

== College career ==
In 2003 Battle began his college career at Fayetteville State University in Fayetteville, North Carolina. Battle played several positions including Offensive Lineman, Defensive Lineman, and Tight End. In his 2006 season he was named pre-season All-American. During his 2007 season he received All-Conference honors (CIAA) and the prestigious Honor as a HBCU All-American. Battle served as captain for the 2007 season. Battle also participated in the All-American Heritage Bowl in Southern California, which hosted the nation's top HBCU senior football players. Battle graduated in 2008 with a bachelor's degree in criminal justice.

== Professional career ==
=== Fayetteville Guard ===
Battle played two seasons for the Fayetteville Guard of the American Indoor Football Association (AIFA) in Fayetteville, North Carolina. He played on the Offensive Line.

=== Dallas Vigilantes ===
On February 5, 2010, Battle signed with the Dallas Vigilantes of the Arena Football League (AFL). He played on the Offensive and Defensive Line. He was placed on reassignment on June 4, 2010.

=== Tulsa Talons ===
Battle is currently assigned to the Tulsa Talons of the Arena Football League.
