= Ed Warinner =

American football player and coach (born 1961)

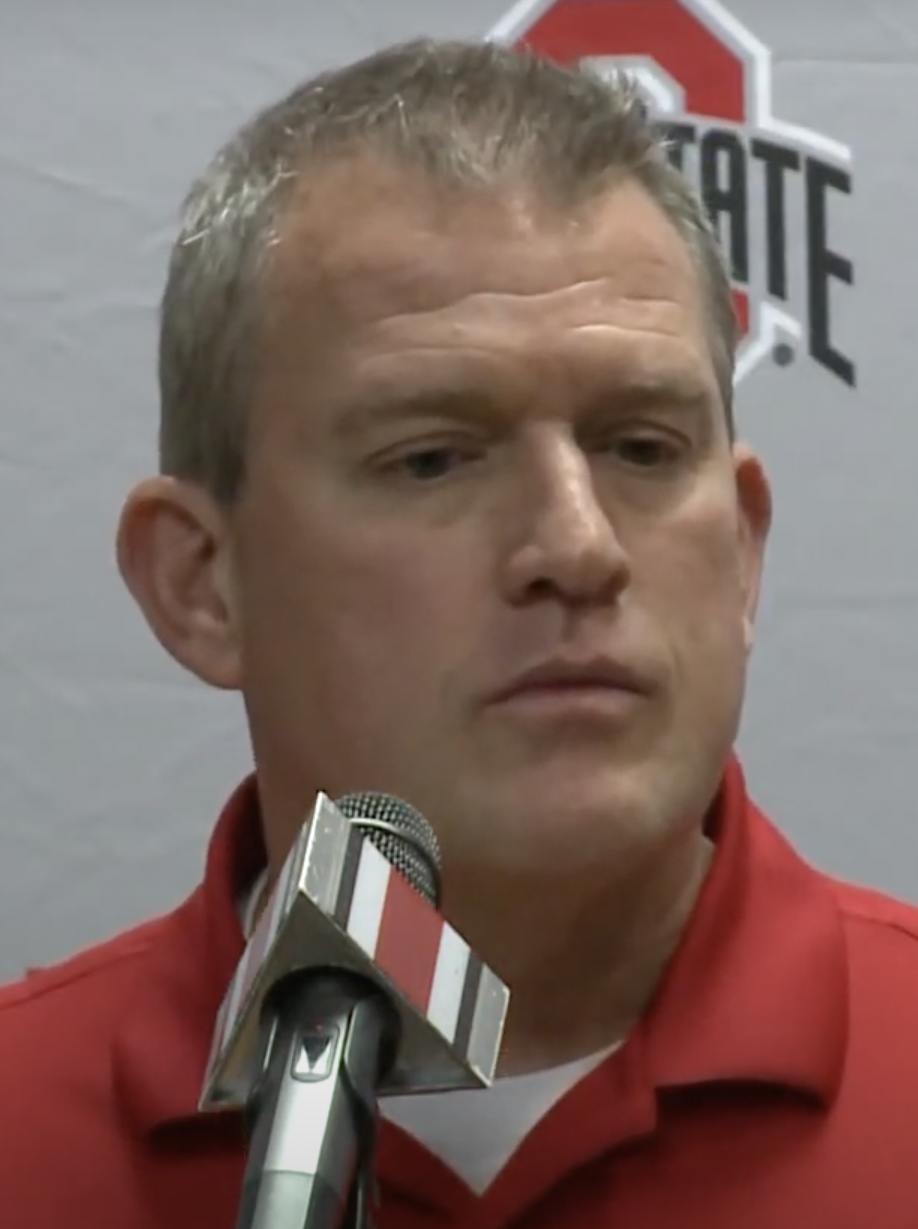
- Warinner in 2014

Current position
- Title: Head coach
- Team: Avila
- Conference: KCAC
- Record: 0–3

Biographical details
- Born: August 5, 1961 (age 65); Strasburg, Ohio, U.S.
- Education: University of Mount Union (1984); University of Akron (1985)

Playing career
- 1979–1983: Mount Union
- Positions: Quarterback, running back

Coaching career (HC unless noted)
- 1984: Akron (RB)
- 1985–1986: Michigan State (LB/DB)
- 1987: Army (OL)
- 1988–1990: Army (exec. asst. / recruiting)
- 1991: Army (DL)
- 1992–1997: Army (OL)
- 1998–1999: Army (OC/QB)
- 2000–2002: Air Force (OL)
- 2003: Kansas (OL)
- 2004: Kansas (OL/RCG)
- 2005–2006: Illinois (OL/RGC)
- 2007–2008: Kansas (OC/QB)
- 2009: Kansas (AHC/OC/QB)
- 2010: Notre Dame (OL)
- 2011: Notre Dame (OL/RGC)
- 2012–2014: Ohio State (co-OC/OL)
- 2015: Ohio State (OC/OL)
- 2016: Ohio State (OC/TE)
- 2017: Minnesota (OL/RGC)
- 2018–2020: Michigan (OL)
- 2021–2023: Florida Atlantic (AHC/RGC/OL)
- 2024–2025: St. Thomas (FL) (TE)
- 2026–present: Avila

Head coaching record
- Overall: 0–3

Ed Warinner (born August 5, 1961) is an American college football coach and former player. He is the head football coach for Avila University, a position he has held since 2026. He has previously served as the run game coordinator for Florida Atlantic University from 2021 to 2024. Before his time at FAU, he was the offensive line coach for Michigan Wolverines football team. He also held assistant coaching positions for Army (1987–1999), Air Force (2000–2002), Kansas (2003–2004, 2007–2009), Illinois (2005–2006), Notre Dame (2010–2011), Ohio State (2012–2016), and Minnesota (2017). He won a national championship with Ohio State in 2014.

Florida Atlantic fired Warinner and defensive coordinator Roc Bellantoni on November 10, 2024. Kyle Chung succeeded Warinner as offensive line coach.

== Head coaching record ==
Year	Team	Overall	Conference	Standing	Bowl/playoffs
Avila Eagles (Kansas Collegiate Athletic Conference) (2026–present)
2026	Avila	0–3	0–0		
Avila:		0–3	0–0		
Total:		0–3			

== Personal life ==
Warinner and his wife, Mary Beth, have two daughters, Madisyn and Merideth, and a son, Edward, who played football at Michigan.
