= Joshua Williams (cornerback) =

American football player (born 1999)

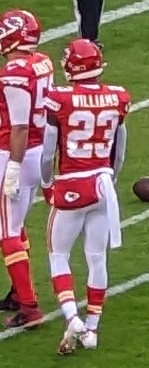
- Williams with the Kansas City Chiefs in 2022

No. 25 – Tennessee Titans
- Position: Cornerback
- Roster status: Active

Personal information
- Born: October 17, 1999 (age 27); Fayetteville, North Carolina, U.S.
- Listed height: 6 ft 3 in (1.91 m)
- Listed weight: 201 lb (91 kg)

Career information
- High school: Jack Britt (Fayetteville)
- College: Fayetteville State (2018–2021)
- NFL draft: 2022: 4th round, 135th overall pick

Career history
- Kansas City Chiefs (2022–2025); Tennessee Titans (2026–present)

Awards and highlights
- 2× Super Bowl champion (LVII, LVIII); First-team All-CIAA (2021)

Career NFL statistics as of Week 10, 2026
- Total tackles: 119
- Sacks: 1.0
- Pass deflections: 20
- Interceptions: 1
- Stats at Pro Football Reference

Joshua Williams (born October 17, 1999) is an American professional football cornerback for the Tennessee Titans of the National Football League (NFL). He played college football for the Fayetteville State Broncos.

== Early life ==
Williams grew up in Fayetteville, North Carolina and attended Jack Britt High School, where he played football and ran track. After graduating from Jack Britt, he completed a postgraduate year at Palmetto Prep in Columbia, South Carolina. He is of Kittitian descent through his father.

== College career ==
Williams primarily played the nickel cornerback position as a freshman at Fayetteville State University. He moved to outside corner before his sophomore year and finished the season with 32 tackles, one tackle for loss, 11 passes defended, and two interceptions. Williams' junior season in 2020 was canceled due to COVID-19. As a senior, he had 31 tackles with nine passes defended and three interceptions, one of which he returned 32 yards for a touchdown, and was named first-team All-Central Intercollegiate Athletic Association. After the conclusion of his college career, Williams played in the 2022 Senior Bowl. Williams participated in the 2022 NFL Combine.

== Professional career ==
Pre-draft measurables
Height	Weight	Arm length	Hand span	Wingspan	40-yard dash	10-yard split	20-yard split	20-yard shuttle	Three-cone drill	Vertical jump	Broad jump	Bench press
6 ft 2 7/8 in (1.90 m)	195 lb (88 kg)	32 7/8 in (0.84 m)	9 1/2 in (0.24 m)	6 ft 5 3/4 in (1.97 m)	4.53 s	1.54 s	2.60 s	4.47 s	6.95 s	37.0 in (0.94 m)	10 ft 4 in (3.15 m)	11 reps
All values from NFL Combine/Pro Day

=== Kansas City Chiefs ===
Williams was selected in the fourth round, 135th overall, of the 2022 NFL draft by the Kansas City Chiefs. He was the first player drafted out of Fayetteville State in the regular portion of the NFL Draft. He was first to be selected in any part of the NFL Draft since Blenda Gay went in the 1973 Supplemental Draft.

Williams caught his first career NFL interception in the Week 7 44–23 win over the San Francisco 49ers. In the AFC Championship against the Cincinnati Bengals, Williams had an interception on Joe Burrow which helped the Chiefs preserve the lead and win 23–20 when the game was tied at 20. The Chiefs reached Super Bowl LVII and defeated the Philadelphia Eagles 38–35. In the Super Bowl, Williams recorded four tackles.

In 2023, Williams won his second straight Super Bowl when the Chiefs defeated the San Francisco 49ers 25–22 in Super Bowl LVIII. Williams recorded two tackles in the game.

=== Tennessee Titans ===
On March 12, 2026, Williams signed a two-year, $6.75 million contract with the Tennessee Titans. On August 30, he was placed on injured reserve with a designation to return meaning he would have to miss at least the first four games of the 2026 season. He was activated on October 17.
