= Derek Fine =

American football player (born 1983)

No. 86
- Position: Tight end

Personal information
- Born: August 24, 1983 (age 43); Sallisaw, Oklahoma, U.S.
- Listed height: 6 ft 3 in (1.91 m)
- Listed weight: 247 lb (112 kg)

Career information
- High school: Sallisaw
- College: Kansas
- NFL draft: 2008: 4th round, 132nd overall pick

Career history
- Buffalo Bills (2008–2009); St. Louis Rams (2010)*; Houston Texans (2010)*
- * Offseason or practice squad member only

Career NFL statistics
- Receptions: 19
- Receiving yards: 158
- Receiving touchdowns: 1
- Stats at Pro Football Reference

Derek Fine (born August 24, 1983) is an American former professional football player who was a tight end in the National Football League (NFL). He played college football for the Kansas Jayhawks and was selected by the Buffalo Bills in the fourth round of the 2008 NFL draft.

Fine was also a member of the St. Louis Rams and Houston Texans.

== College career ==
In his junior year at Kansas, Fine received the Gale Sayers Award for the team's most courageous player. He was a team captain in his senior year, in which he caught 46 passes for 394 total receiving yards. He was a part of the Jayhawks team that went 12-1 and won the 2008 Orange Bowl.

== Professional career ==
Pre-draft measurables
Height	Weight	40-yard dash	10-yard split	20-yard split	20-yard shuttle	Three-cone drill	Vertical jump	Broad jump	Bench press
6 ft 2 5/8 in (1.90 m)	251 lb (114 kg)	4.85 s	1.65 s	2.78 s	4.19 s	6.80 s	29 in (0.74 m)	9 ft 7 in (2.92 m)	24 reps
All values from NFL Combine.

=== Buffalo Bills ===
The Buffalo Bills selected Fine in the fourth round of the 2008 NFL draft, with the 132nd overall selection.

On November 2, 2008 Fine caught his first pass in the NFL against the New York Jets. The reception was a 9-yard touchdown pass thrown by quarterback Trent Edwards.

In 2009, during a game against the New York Jets, Fine was battling Jets linebacker Marques Murrell and eventually started a fight with Murrell and Murrell's teammate James Ihedigbo. This fight led to Ihedigbo being ejected for trying to land a punch on Fine.

Fine was placed on injured reserve on September 22, 2009 and was replaced by Joe Klopfenstein. He was waived on February 16, 2010.

=== St. Louis Rams ===
Fine was claimed off waivers by the St. Louis Rams on February 17, 2010. He was waived on March 5, 2010.

=== Houston Texans ===
Fine was signed by the Houston Texans on June 16, 2010.

On September 5, 2010, Fine was waived by the Houston Texans.
