= Marques Murrell =

American gridiron football player (born 1985)

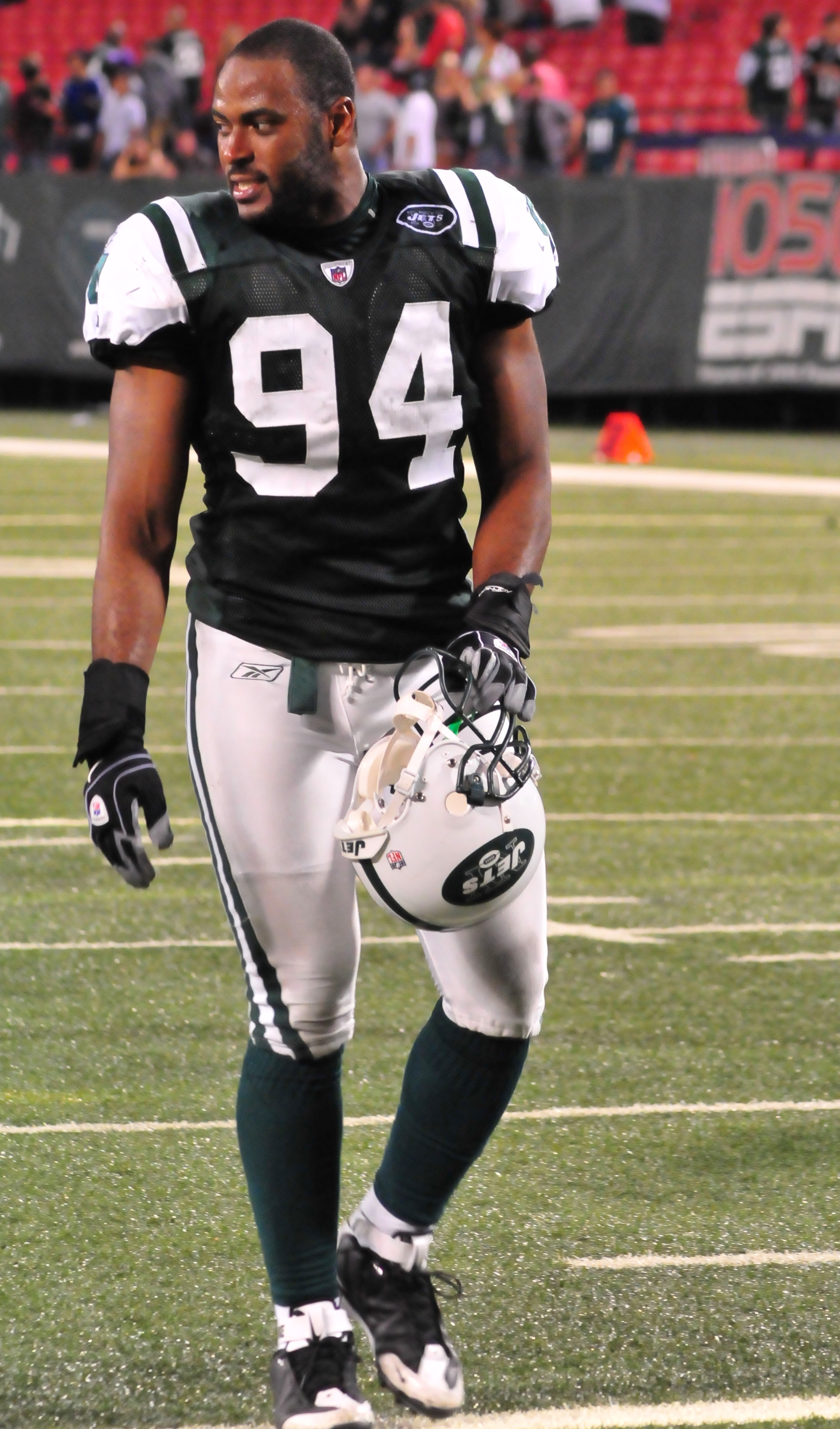
- Murrell with the New York Jets in 2009

No. 94, 93, 52, 54
- Position: Linebacker

Personal information
- Born: March 20, 1985 (age 41); Fayetteville, North Carolina, U.S.
- Listed height: 6 ft 2 in (1.88 m)
- Listed weight: 234 lb (106 kg)

Career information
- High school: Jack Britt (Fayetteville)
- College: Appalachian State (2003–2006)
- NFL draft: 2007: undrafted

Career history
- Philadelphia Eagles (2007)*; New York Jets (2007–2009); New England Patriots (2010); Virginia Destroyers (2011); Montreal Alouettes (2012)
- * Offseason or practice squad member only

Awards and highlights
- UFL champion (2011); 2× NCAA Division I-AA/FCS national champion (2005, 2006); 2× NCAA Division I-AA/FCS All-American (2005, 2006); SoCon Male Athlete of the Year (2006); SoCon Defensive Player of the Year (2006)

Career NFL statistics
- Total tackles: 22
- Forced fumbles: 2
- Stats at Pro Football Reference

Marques Allen Murrell (born March 20, 1985) is an American former professional football player who was a linebacker in the National Football League (NFL). He played college football for the Appalachian State Mountaineers and was signed by the Philadelphia Eagles as an undrafted free agent in 2007.

Murrell also played for the New York Jets, New England Patriots, Virginia Destroyers and Montreal Alouettes. He is the younger brother of former NFL running back Adrian Murrell, who played with the Jets from 1993 to 1997.

== Early life ==
Murrell registered 21 sacks over his final two seasons at Jack Britt High School in Fayetteville, North Carolina, to earn All-Region honors.

== College career ==
Murrell was a two-time first-team All-American performer at Appalachian State University, finishing his career with 36 sacks and a school-record 18 forced fumbles. Murrell gained 13 sacks in both his junior and senior seasons, fueling his Appalachian State to two consecutive Division I-AA National Championships in 2005 and 2006. In the 2005 title game he forced a fumble that was returned by Jason Hunter for the winning touchdown in a 21–16 victory over University of Northern Iowa.

== Professional career ==
=== Philadelphia Eagles ===
Murrell was signed by the Philadelphia Eagles as an undrafted free agent on May 14, 2007, following the 2007 NFL draft. He was waived by the Eagles during final cuts on September 1, 2007, and was re-signed to the team's practice squad two days later.

=== New York Jets ===
Murrell was signed off the Eagles' practice squad by the New York Jets on November 7, 2007. Murrell played in four of the Jets' final seven games of the season, but did not record any stats. In 2008, Murrell made the Jets' 53-man roster and played in 12 games as a reserve, recording nine tackles.

In 16-13 overtime loss to the Buffalo Bills on October 18, 2009, Murrell and Jets safety James Ihedigbo threw punches at Bills tight end Derek Fine, prompting Murrell to be fined by the NFL for $5,000 and be benched, along with Ihedigbo, by head coach Rex Ryan for the following game against the Oakland Raiders on October 25, 2009. Murrell finished the 2009 season with 12 tackles in ten games played.

He was not tendered by the Jets as a restricted free agent following the season and became an unrestricted free agent.

=== New England Patriots ===
Murrell signed with the New England Patriots on March 9, 2010. He was released on September 13 after playing in the Patriots' season opener against the Cincinnati Bengals. The Patriots re-signed Murrell on January 5, 2011, prior to their first playoff game. He was waived on August 30.

=== Montreal Alouettes ===
On May 7, 2012, Murrell signed a two-year contract with the Montreal Alouettes of the Canadian Football League.
