= Bill Young (American football coach) =

American football player and coach (1946–2021)

Biographical details
- Born: August 17, 1946; Hereford, Texas
- Died: March 17, 2021 (aged 74); Tulsa, Oklahoma

Playing career
- 1965–1967: Oklahoma State
- Positions: Outside linebacker, defensive tackle

Coaching career (HC unless noted)
- 1969: Carl Albert HS (OK) (assistant)
- 1970–1975: Putnam City West HS (OK) (DC)
- 1976–1978: Oklahoma State (OL/DL)
- 1979: Iowa State (DT)
- 1980–1982: Tulsa (DL)
- 1983–1984: Tulsa (DC/DL)
- 1985–1987: Arizona State (DL)
- 1988–1995: Ohio State (DC)
- 1996–1997: Oklahoma (DC)
- 1998–2000: USC (DC)
- 2001: Detroit Lions (DL)
- 2002–2007: Kansas (DC)
- 2008: Miami (FL) (DC)
- 2009–2012: Oklahoma State (DC)
- 2013: Wyoming (DQC)
- 2014: Yukon HS (OK)
- 2015–2018: Tulsa (DC/DL)

Head coaching record
- Overall: 4–6

Accomplishments and honors

Awards
- Academic All-Big Eight (1967)

William Louis Young (August 17, 1946 – March 17, 2021) was an American football coach whose career spanned more than 45 years at the high school, collegiate, and professional levels. He served as the defensive coordinator at prominent college football programs like Ohio State (1988–1995), Oklahoma (1996–1997), USC (1998–2000), Miami (2008), and Oklahoma State (2009–2012).

== Early years ==
Born in Hereford, Texas, Young attended U.S. Grant High School in Oklahoma City, Oklahoma. He attended Oklahoma State University and graduated in 1968. He later earned a master's degree from Central Oklahoma. After his senior year of high school Young was named to the Oklahoma all-state team as an alternate. Young was a defensive lineman at Oklahoma State. He started for three years and was an academic all-conference player. He was also an honorable mention all-conference player.

== Coaching career ==
After graduating, Young spent six seasons as a high school coach at Carl Albert and Putnam City West before returning to Oklahoma State as a graduate assistant.

Young was a finalist for the Broyles Award, given to the nation's top assistant coach, while at Kansas in 2007. He then orchestrated a defensive turnaround unprecedented at Oklahoma State. For once the defense was actually the bright spot on the team as it finished in the Top 35 in the nation in 2009.

When hired by Oklahoma State, Young stated that he was torn between having to choose between Miami and OSU. He also went on to say "It means a lot to me to come back to OSU because I am a graduate, I played there and now we are back as part of the Cowboy family. My wife and I are very excited to get back to Stillwater and Oklahoma State."
