= Fayetteville State Broncos and Lady Broncos =

Athletic teams representing Fayetteville State University

- University: Fayetteville State University
- Conference: CIAA (primary)
- NCAA: Division II
- Athletic director: Anthony Bennett
- Location: Fayetteville, North Carolina
- Varsity teams: 11 (4 men's, 6 women's, 1 co-ed)
- Football stadium: Luther "Nick" Jeralds Stadium
- Basketball arena: Felton J. Capel Arena
- Softball stadium: Lamon Street Park
- Mascot: Mr. Bronco
- Nickname: Broncos
- Colors: Blue and gray
- Website: fsubroncos.com

The Fayetteville State Broncos and Lady Broncos are the athletic teams that represent Fayetteville State University, located in Fayetteville, North Carolina, in intercollegiate sports at the Division II level of the National Collegiate Athletic Association (NCAA), primarily competing in the Central Intercollegiate Athletic Association since the 1954–55 academic year.

Fayetteville State competes in eleven intercollegiate varsity sports. Men's sports include basketball, cross country, football, and golf; while women's sports include basketball, bowling, cross country, softball, track and field (indoor and outdoor), and volleyball. Women's tennis was discontinued at the end of the 2019–20 school year.

== Conference affiliations ==
NCAA

- Central Intercollegiate Athletic Association (1954–present)

== Varsity teams ==
The Broncos also sponsor a cheerleading team. The program sponsored a women's tennis team until the end of the 2019–20 season.

Men's sports	Women's sports
Basketball	Basketball
Cross country	Bowling
Football	Cross country
Golf	Softball
	Track and field^{1}
	Volleyball
^{1} – includes both indoor and outdoor

=== Football ===
The university won back-to-back CIAA football championships in 2002 and 2003. They also won the 2009 CIAA Football Championship and advanced to the NCAA Division II football playoff. The Broncos were Western Division Champions in 2002, 2003, 2004, 2009, 2017, 2018 and 2019.

== Notable alumni ==
=== Football ===
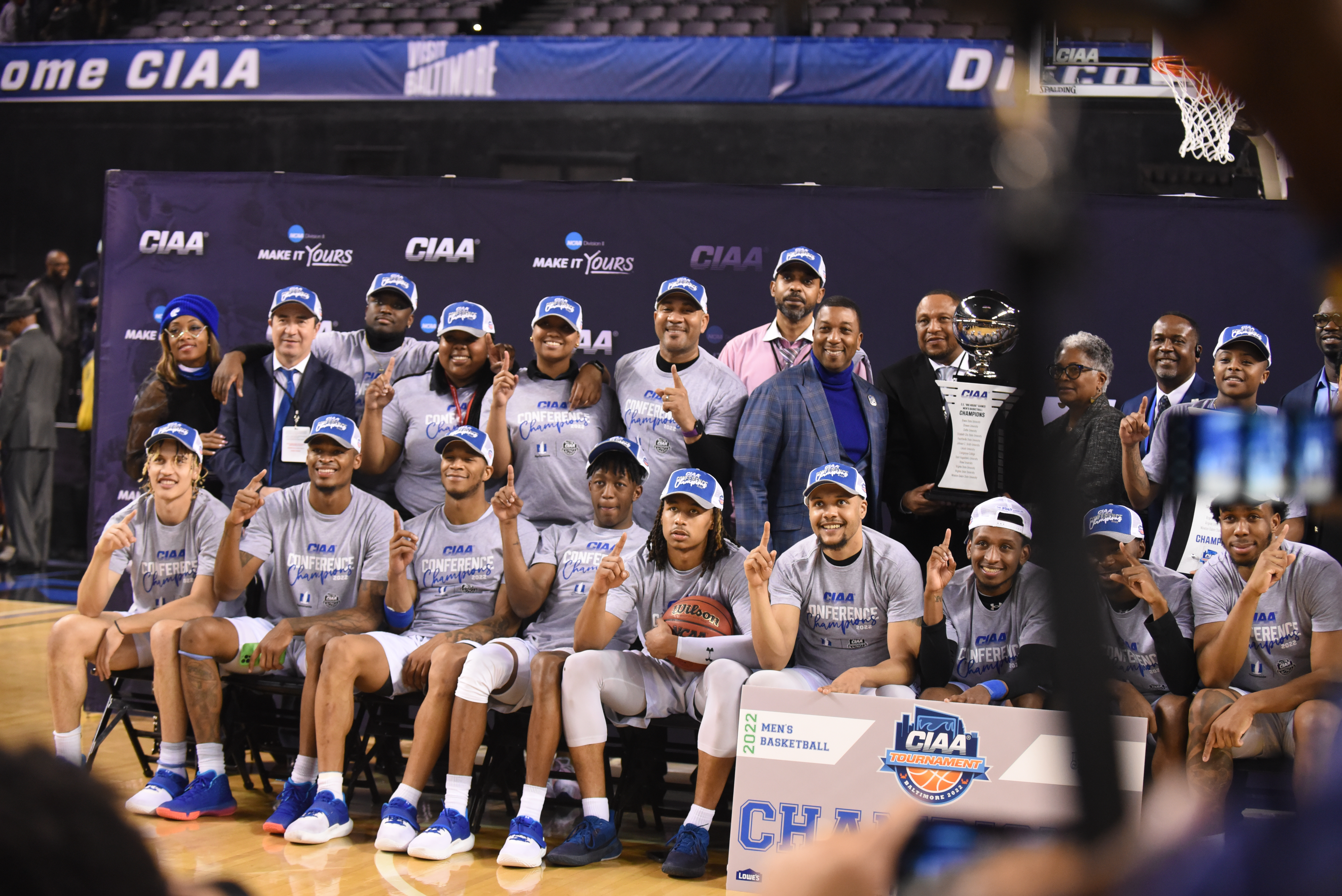
Men's basketball team of 2021–22

- Garry Battle
- Andre Bowden
- Chris Hubert
- Sylvester Ritter, former WWE wrestler and Hall of Fame inductee. Wrestled under the ring name Junkyard Dog
- Kion Smith
- Joshua Williams

=== Men's basketball ===
- Darrell Armstrong
- Jeff Capel II
- Jalen Seegars, American basketball player
