= Xavier Nixon =

American football player (born 1990)

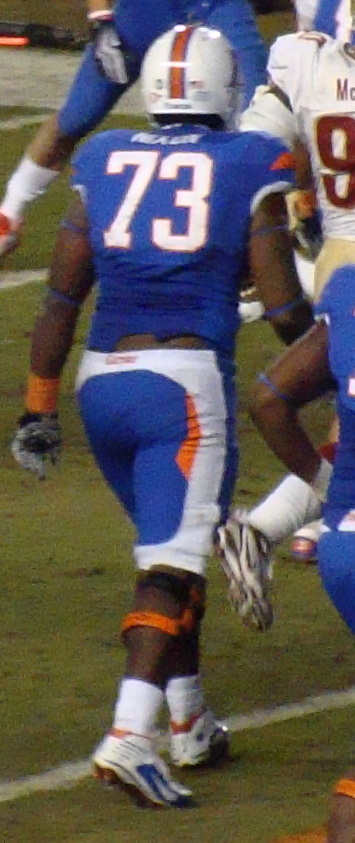
- Nixon with Florida in 2009

No. 71
- Position: Offensive tackle

Personal information
- Born: September 17, 1990 (age 36); Fayetteville, North Carolina, U.S.
- Listed height: 6 ft 6 in (1.98 m)
- Listed weight: 330 lb (150 kg)

Career information
- High school: Jack Britt (Fayetteville)
- College: Florida
- NFL draft: 2013: undrafted

Career history
- Washington Redskins (2013)*; Indianapolis Colts (2013–2014); Washington Redskins (2015)*
- * Offseason or practice squad member only

Awards and highlights
- Freshman All-SEC (2009)

Career NFL statistics
- Games played: 8
- Games started: 2
- Stats at Pro Football Reference

Xavier A. Nixon (born September 17, 1990) is an American former professional football player who was an offensive tackle in the National Football League (NFL). He played college football for the Florida Gators. Initially projected to be a third-round pick, he was signed as an undrafted free agent by the Washington Redskins following the 2013 NFL draft. He made his NFL debut with the Indianapolis Colts.

== Early life ==
Nixon was born in Fayetteville, North Carolina. He grew up in a military family in Fayetteville, where his mother and step father were stationed at Fort Bragg. He attended Jack Britt High School in Fayetteville, where he was a two-way lineman for the Jack Britt Buccaneers high school football team. Leading Jack Britt to the Class 4-AA state championship game, Nixon was named first-team all-state offensive lineman following his senior season. He also compiled 50 tackles while playing on the defensive line. Nixon earned high school All-American honors from Parade magazine and USA Today, and was invited to the 2009 U.S. Army All-American Bowl.

Considered a four-star recruit by Rivals.com, Nixon was listed as the No. 3 offensive tackle prospect in the nation in 2009, behind D. J. Fluker and Mason Walters. Nixon chose Florida over offers from Clemson, Notre Dame, and South Carolina.

== College career ==
Nixon accepted an athletic scholarship to attend the University of Florida, where he played for coach Urban Meyer and coach Will Muschamp's Gators teams from 2009 to 2012. As a true freshman in 2009, he started the season as backup at left tackle. In a game at South Carolina, he made his first career start at left tackle. Nixon was the first freshman to start at left tackle for the Gators since Reggie Green in 1992. He was credited with helping to reduce the number of quarterback sacks by opposing teams.

== Professional career ==
=== Washington Redskins ===
Despite his once "sure-thing" status as a likely NFL draft prospect, he was not chosen during the 2013 NFL draft. The Washington Redskins signed him as an undrafted free agent on April 28, 2013. The Redskins waived him on August 31, 2013, for final roster cuts before the start of 2013 season, he was signed to the team's practice squad the next day.

=== Indianapolis Colts ===
The Indianapolis Colts signed him off the Washington Redskins' practice squad on September 24, 2013. On October 28, 2013, Nixon was waived by the Indianapolis Colts, only to be re-signed to the team's practice squad the next day. He was signed back to the active roster on December 3. In Week 14 against the Cincinnati Bengals, Nixon had his NFL debut. After also playing in week 15, he made his first start at left guard in week 16 against the Kansas City Chiefs, replacing Hugh Thornton, who was inactive with neck injury. Due to missing the team's flight, Nixon did not participate and was listed as inactive in the 2014 AFC Championship Game against the New England Patriots.

He was placed on waivers on February 11, 2015.

=== Washington Redskins (second stint) ===
On February 13, 2015, the Washington Redskins were awarded Nixon through a waiver claim. He was waived on May 8.
