= The Fifth (band) =

American rock band

THE FIFTH
- Origin: Fayetteville, North Carolina, U.S.
- Genres: Rock, hard rock, heavy metal
- Years active: 2001–present
- Members: Roy Cathey; Jake Tripp; Gary "Zeus" Smith; Jack Frost
- Past members: Franko; DC Garcia; Chuck Titpon; Rob Lee; Marc Anthony; Joseph "Poptart" Nation; Bernie "B-Man" Mangiboyat; Darius Rose; Icky Jim; Justin Womble
- Website: https://www.thefifthmusic.com

THE FIFTH is an American hard rock band originally formed in Fayetteville, North Carolina, United States. Founded in 2001 by vocalist Roy Cathey, the current lineup also includes guitarist Jack Frost, bassist Jake Tripp and drummer Gary "Zeus" Smith. The band signed to EMG/Universal Records in July 2009, with Monster Energy sponsoring the band.

In 2012, the band celebrated 11 years together with a free show at IT'Z Entertainment City in Fayetteville, North Carolina.

THE FIFTH announced a North-American tour with Maryland heavy metal band, Offensive in early 2022. Later that year they performed on Kiss Kruise XI.

== History ==
Roy's career in music started in the late 1980s with a band called Gibraltar. Gibraltar received air play locally with a ballad titled "Real", then in the early 1990s, he joined a band called Cold Sweat with former Keel Lead and Rhythm guitarist Marc Ferrari. Roy Cathey co-wrote "Long Way Down" and "Killing Floor" from Cold Sweat's debut album Break Out. Cold Sweat released the "Lets Make Love Tonight" video to MTV and on that day, Cold Sweat was dropped from MCA records. The breakup of Cold Sweat came when Grunge took over MTV and radio due to its objectively more interesting songwriting.

Bernie Mangiboyat and Roy Cathey met in their early days on the Fayetteville music scene. Cathey played in a band called Gibraltar alongside the later Fifth guitar player Dave "DC" Garcia, while Mangiboyat played for another local band. They met when Cathey phoned Mangiboyat one day to ask him to be the opening act for his band. Thereafter, Mangiboyat and his band performed alongside Gibraltar and his future bandmate of The Fifth. Mangiboyat's band broke up in the early 1990s. The Fifth would later form in 2001.

The Fifth was formed in 2001 In Fayetteville NC by vocalist Roy Cathey, guitarist Dave "DC" Garcia, bassist Bernie "B-man" Mangiboyat, and drummer Rob Lee. They would get their name from Roy's job as a dj in adult clubs. When counting money he would tally it up to keep track. Roy came up with the name "The Fifth" and thought "That would look cool on a kick drum". A self-titled EP was later released, later followed by a compilation EP called "Welcome To The War" following their debate album. Their first album 'Plead' released in 2003. In 2006, D.C Garcia left the band and was replaced by Icky Jim. Rob Lee departed in 2007 and was replaced by Marc Anthony.

As the band started to become more popular locally, the new lineup of vocals Roy Cathey, bassist Bernie "B-man" Mangiboyat, Guitarist Icky Jim, and drummer Marc Anthony. As they played shows they become popular and started gaining traction in certain cities and states and would be known for their great live performances. They would even going as far as doings tour Japan in 2007–08. After they came back from Japan they released 'Confessions Of Man' in 2008. Then in July 2009 the fifth was signed to EMG/Universal. They also re released "Confessions of Man" under the label. The song on the album "The Gift (take it back)" Received local air play becoming pretty popular with the fifth's fans. Then Marc Anthony later leave the band in 2010. They then brought in drummer Chuck Titpon. Then in April 2013 bassist B-Man parted ways from the band. Chuck would also depart shortly after. Afterwards, the band would bring in bassist Franko and new drummer Darius Rose. Then released single "No Going Home" in 2016. Darius would leave shortly after, and Chuck would return. Eventually Franko, Chuck, and Icky Jim would leave the band.

New members guitarist Justin Womble, bassist Jake Tripp and drummer Gary "Zeus" Smith would join the band over the following years. With the lineup solidified, they released a remastered version of "Confessions of Man" in 2020. Afterwards the band recorded an EP released in 2021, self titled 'The Fifth'.

In 2022, the band was the first to sign to RFK Media, a new label founded by Ron Keel of Steeler, Keel, and Black Sabbath fame. Later that year, they performed on the Kiss Kruise alongside Kiss, LA Guns, Warrant, and more.

== Members ==
=== Current members ===
- Roy Cathey – Lead Vocals (2001–present)
- Jack Frost – Guitars/Backing Vocals (2025–present)
- Jake Tripp – Bass/Backing Vocals (2019–present)
- Gary "Zeus" Smith – Drums/Backing Vocals (2017–present)

=== Former members ===
- Franko (Bass)
- DC Garcia (Guitars)
- Chuck Tipton (Drums)
- Rob Lee (Drums)
- Marc Anthony (Drums, Backing Vocals)
- Joseph "Poptart" Nation (Drums)
- Bernie "B-Man" Mangiboyat (Bass, Backing Vocals)
- Darius "Bunky" Rose (Drums)
- Icky Jim (Guitars)
- Justin Womble (Guitars)

== Management ==
The Fifth has signed with Head First Entertainment in February 2014.

== Television spots ==
- Grey's Anatomy Season 5 Episode 9 "In the Midnight Hour" Promo featured: "Even To This Day"
- Two separate Dodge Ram commercials have The Fifth songs on them.
  - Dodge Ram Challenge (Fireman) has the riffs from "Been Here Before"
  - Dodge Ram Challenge (Military) has the riffs from "Turnaway"
- The Voice season 4 promo included "Been Here Before”

== Discography ==
| Year | Album | Label |
|---|---|---|
| 2002 | EP | – |
| 2003 | Plead | Infidel |
| 2005 | Welcome to the War | Infidel |
| 2009 | Confessions of Man | EMG/Universal Records |
| 2021 | THE FIFTH | Weapon Records/Vanity |
| 2025 | We Are One | RFK Media |
