= Justin Miller =

Justin Miller may refer to:

== Sports ==
- Justin Miller (American football) (born 1984), American football player
- Justin Miller (baseball, born 1977), American baseball relief pitcher (1977-2013)
- Justin Miller (baseball, born 1987), American baseball relief pitcher
- Justin Miller (soccer) (born 1980), South African soccer player

== Others ==
- Justin Miller (attorney) (born 1975), attorney
- Justin Miller (barbershop)
- Justin Miller (judge) (1888–1973)
