= 2006 New York Jets season =

2006 season of NFL team New York Jets

- Owner: Woody & Christopher Johnson
- General manager: Mike Tannenbaum
- Head coach: Eric Mangini
- Offensive coordinator: Brian Schottenheimer
- Defensive coordinator: Bob Sutton
- Home stadium: Giants Stadium

Results
- Record: 10–6
- Division place: 2nd AFC East
- Playoffs: Lost Wild Card Playoffs (at Patriots) 16–37
- Pro Bowlers: CB/RS Justin Miller

Uniform
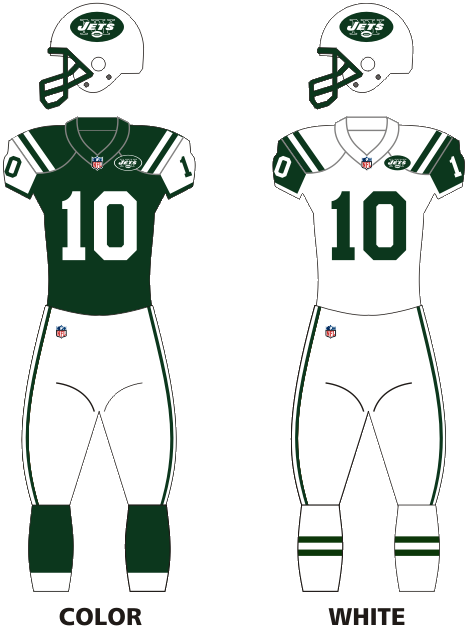

The 2006 New York Jets season was the franchise's 37th season in the National Football League (NFL), the 47th season overall, and the first under new head coach Eric Mangini.

The season began with the team trying to improve on their 4–12 record in 2005. The season marked the first for rookie head coach Eric Mangini, who replaced Herman Edwards after the latter left the Jets to coach the Kansas City Chiefs. Although expectations were low for the team, the Jets managed to go 10–6, including winning five of their final six games, and clinched their first playoff berth since 2004 and the fifth seed in the playoffs. They fell in the wild card round to the division rival New England Patriots by a score of 37–16.

== Offseason ==
=== Coaching changes ===
Head coach Herman Edwards left the Jets on January 8, when he was announced as the successor to coach Dick Vermeil for the Kansas City Chiefs, despite Edwards’ insistence during the season that he would finish the remainder of his contract with the Jets. The Jets received a fourth-round pick in the 2006 NFL draft from the Chiefs for the right to negotiate with Edwards, which was roundly criticized as unsubstantial for the loss of a head coach. On January 17, the Jets announced that New England Patriots defensive coordinator Eric Mangini had been signed as head coach. Mangini became the youngest head coach in the NFL, turning 35 on January 19. Mangini's first order of business was to reorganize the coaching staff. Offensive coordinator Mike Heimerdinger and defensive coordinator Donnie Henderson were both released from the Jets staff. Special Teams Coordinator Mike Westoff was retained. A full staff was announced on February 20. Linebackers coach Bob Sutton was named defensive coordinator and the team signed Jim Herrmann to replace Sutton as the linebackers coach. Herrmann was the defensive coordinator at the University of Michigan for twenty years before arriving in New York.

General Manager Terry Bradway announced that he was stepping down as Jets GM on February 7. Assistant GM Mike Tannenbaum was named the new GM on the same day. Bradway continues to be employed by the Jets organization as a scouting consultant.

=== Player transactions ===
The Jets moved quickly to get under the salary cap as they were over by $25 million. On February 22, tackle Jason Fabini, quarterback Jay Fiedler, linebacker Barry Gardner, defensive tackle Lance Legree, fullback Jerald Sowell and wide receiver Harry Williams were placed on waivers. The team chose not to tender an offer to Mark Brown. Cornerback Ty Law also parted ways with the Jets, as the organization decided not to exercise the contract option to extend his contract through 2008. Running back Curtis Martin agreed to an undisclosed restructured contract.

Pro Bowl Center Kevin Mawae was released on March 5. Mawae disagreed with the assertion that his release was for salary cap reasons, as his cut would only be a savings of $1.1 million, and felt that it was simply a change in direction for the team, and Mawae later signed with the Tennessee Titans.

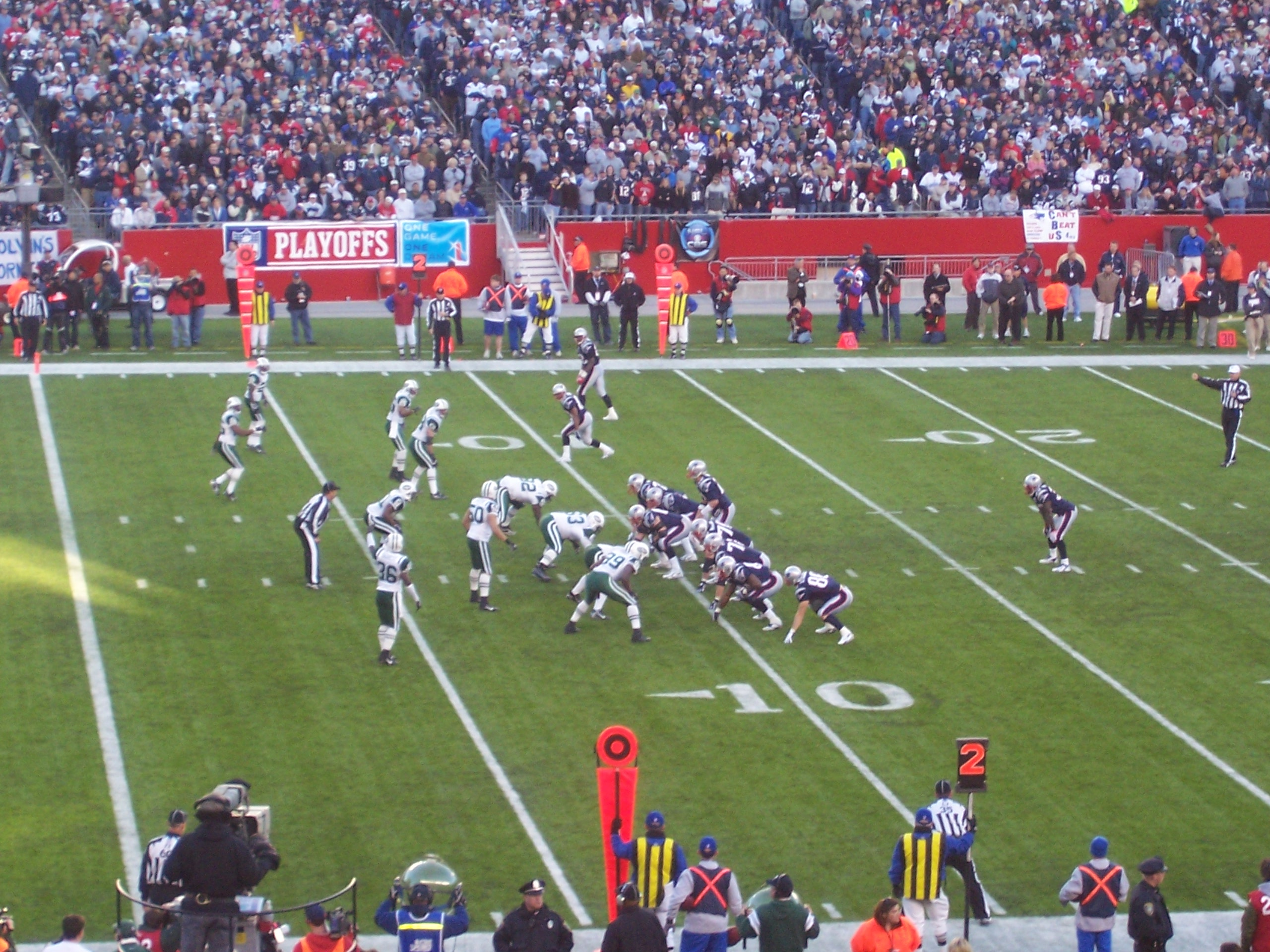
New England vs. New York Jets in the wild card playoff game

The Jets also restructured the contract of quarterback Chad Pennington. Pennington's contract was cut from a base salary of $6 million to $3 million. Pennington will be able to make back the $3 million through incentives. He also had to forfeit his $3 million roster bonus that was due at the start of free agency.

John Abraham was designated the team's franchise player. He would later be traded to the Atlanta Falcons involving a 3-way trade between the Jets, Falcons, and the Denver Broncos. The Falcons traded their first-round draft pick (#15) to the Broncos for the Broncos first (#29), third (#93) and 2008 fourth-round pick. The Falcons traded the #29 overall pick to the Jets in exchange for Abraham.

Patrick Ramsey was traded to the Jets on March 17 for their sixth-round draft pick. Tight end Chris Baker, who became an unrestricted free agent in the offseason, re-signed with the Jets, his hometown team, on March 24. Andre Dyson was signed by the Jets on March 29 for a five-year, $11.5 million deal, including $3 million in signing and roster bonuses.

Other notable signings include linebackers Matt Chatham, a former New England Patriot, ex-Tennessee Titan Brad Kassell, ex-Pittsburgh Steeler defensive end Kimo von Oelhoffen, another ex-Patriot wide receiver, Tim Dwight, ex-Denver Bronco defensive tackle Monsanto Pope, ex-Buffalo Bill center Trey Teague, and ex-Arizona Cardinal Offensive Tackle Anthony Clement.

The club also signed former longtime Jets Victor Green and Richie Anderson. Both intend to retire in a Jets uniform. Kevan Barlow was acquired from the San Francisco 49ers for an undisclosed draft pick in the 2007 NFL draft, after the Jets’ trade of defensive back Derrick Strait to the Cleveland Browns for running back Lee Suggs on August 14 fell through because Suggs failed his physical.

On the eve of the Jets pre-season finale, they sent quarterback Brooks Bollinger to the Minnesota Vikings for C.J. Mosley. Backup tight end Doug Jolley was also traded to the Tampa Bay Buccaneers for an undisclosed draft pick. The team also picked up Cowboys tight end Sean Ryan for an undisclosed draft pick and claimed former Texas standout Sloan Thomas from the Titans.

=== 2006 NFL draft ===
As a result of their 4–12 2005 record, the Jets were granted the fourth pick in the first round of the NFL draft, which was held on April 29 and 30. When the Houston Texans announced they would take defensive end Mario Williams of North Carolina State instead of Heisman Trophy-winning running back Reggie Bush of USC, some observers felt the Jets should trade up to the second pick and draft him. However, it appeared that making such a trade would have been too prohibitive for the team, and Bush would be drafted second by the New Orleans Saints. Instead, the Jets decided to focus on their offensive line with the draft and took offensive tackle D'Brickashaw Ferguson from Virginia. With their other first-round pick acquired in the John Abraham trade, they took center Nick Mangold of Ohio State.

2006 New York Jets draft
Round	Pick	Player	Position	College	Notes
1	4	D'Brickashaw Ferguson *	OT	Virginia	
1	29	Nick Mangold *	C	Ohio State	from Denver via Atlanta
2	49	Kellen Clemens	QB	Oregon	from Dallas
3	76	Anthony Schlegel	LB	Ohio State	from Philadelphia
3	97	Eric Smith	S	Michigan State	Compensatory pick
4	103	Brad Smith	WR	Missouri	
4	117	Leon Washington *	RB	Florida State	from Kansas City
5	150	Jason Pociask	TE	Wisconsin	from Dallas
6	189	Drew Coleman	CB	TCU	from Washington via New York Jets and Dallas
7	220	Titus Adams	DT	Nebraska	from Philadelphia
Made roster * Made at least one Pro Bowl during career

== Staff ==
2006 New York Jets staff
Front office: Owner – Woody Johnson; Head coaches: Head coach – Eric Mangini; Offensive coaches: Offensive coordinator – Brian Schottenheimer; Running backs – Jimmy Raye; Wide receivers – Noel Mazzone; Assistant wide receivers/tight ends – Richie Anderson; Offensive line – Tony Wise; Assistant offensive line/tight ends – Mike Devlin; Quality control – Jason Michael	Defensive coaches: Defensive coordinator – Bob Sutton; Defensive line coach – Denny Marcin; Assistant defensive line – Bryan Cox; Linebackers – Jim Herrmann; Defensive backs – Corwin Brown; Defensive quality control/coaches' assistant – Andy Dickerson; Special teams coaches: Special teams coordinator – Mike Westhoff; Assistant special teams/assistant running backs – San Gash; Strength and conditioning: Head strength and conditioning – Markus Paul; Assistant strength and conditioning – Rick Lyle; Assistant strength and conditioning – Brett Bech

== Roster ==
2006 New York Jets roster
Quarterbacks (QB): 6 Kellen Clemens; 10 Chad Pennington; 11 Patrick Ramsey; Running backs (RB): 35 B. J. Askew FB; 32 Kevan Barlow; 23 Derrick Blaylock; 44 James Hodgins FB; 34 Cedric Houston; 45 Stacy Tutt FB; 29 Leon Washington; Wide receivers (WR): 87 Laveranues Coles; 89 Jerricho Cotchery; 81 Justin McCareins; 16 Brad Smith; 15 Wallace Wright; Tight ends (TE): 86 Chris Baker; 88 Sean Ryan	Offensive linemen (OL): 68 Anthony Clement T; 60 D'Brickashaw Ferguson T; 76 Na'Shan Goddard G; 79 Adrian Jones T; 66 Pete Kendall G; 74 Nick Mangold C; 65 Brandon Moore G; 71 Wade Smith T; Defensive linemen (DL): 96 Dave Ball DE; 92 Shaun Ellis DE; 98 Bobby Hamilton DE; 77 Rashad Moore DT; 75 C.J. Mosley DT; 63 Dewayne Robertson DT; 99 Bryan Thomas DE; 67 Kimo von Oelhoffen DT	Linebackers (LB): 50 Eric Barton OLB; 58 Matt Chatham OLB; 54 Victor Hobson OLB; 55 Brad Kassell OLB; 56 Anthony Schlegel MLB; 53 Cody Spencer OLB; 51 Jonathan Vilma MLB; Defensive backs (DB): 36 David Barrett CB; 30 Drew Coleman CB; 26 Erik Coleman SS; 21 Andre Dyson CB; 22 Justin Miller CB/KR; 31 Hank Poteat CB; 25 Kerry Rhodes FS; 33 Eric Smith FS; 38 Jamie Thompson FS; 42 Rashad Washington SS; Special teams (ST): 85 James Dearth LS; 7 Ben Graham P; 1 Mike Nugent K	Practice squad: 97 Darrell Adams DE; 78 Ed Blanton T; 75 Zarnell Fitch DT; 40 Joe Kowalewski FB; 41 Andre Maddox S; 61 Keyonta Marshall DT; 62 Matt McChesney G; 14 Sloan Thomas WR; Reserve: 17 Tim Dwight WR/PR (IR); 28 Curtis Martin RB (PUP); 82 Jason Pociask TE (IR); 91 Sione Po'uha DT (IR); -- Trey Teague C/T (IR); Rookies in italics 53 active, 5 reserve, 8 practice squad

== Preseason ==
Week	Date	Opponent	Result	Record	Venue	Recap
1	August 11	at Tampa Bay Buccaneers	L 3–16	0–1	Raymond James Stadium	Recap
2	August 19	at Washington Redskins	W 27–14	1–1	FedExField	Recap
3	August 25	New York Giants	L 7–13	1–2	Giants Stadium	Recap
4	September 1	Philadelphia Eagles	W 20–17	2–2	Giants Stadium	Recap

== Regular season ==
In addition to their regular games with AFC East rivals, the Jets played teams from the AFC South and NFC North as per the schedule rotation, and also played intraconference games against the Cleveland Browns and the Oakland Raiders based on divisional positions from 2005.

=== Schedule ===
Week	Date	Opponent	Result	Record	Venue	Recap
1	September 10	at Tennessee Titans	**W** 23–16	1–0	LP Field	Recap
2	September 17	**New England Patriots**	**L** 17–24	1–1	Giants Stadium	Recap
3	September 24	at **Buffalo Bills**	**W** 28–20	2–1	Ralph Wilson Stadium	Recap
4	October 1	Indianapolis Colts	**L** 28–31	2–2	Giants Stadium	Recap
5	October 8	at Jacksonville Jaguars	**L** 0–41	2–3	Alltel Stadium	Recap
6	October 15	**Miami Dolphins**	**W** 20–17	3–3	Giants Stadium	Recap
7	October 22	Detroit Lions	**W** 31–24	4–3	Giants Stadium	Recap
8	October 29	at Cleveland Browns	**L** 13–20	4–4	Cleveland Browns Stadium	Recap
9	Bye					
10	November 12	at **New England Patriots**	**W** 17–14	5–4	Gillette Stadium	Recap
11	November 19	Chicago Bears	**L** 0–10	5–5	Giants Stadium	Recap
12	November 26	Houston Texans	**W** 26–11	6–5	Giants Stadium	Recap
13	December 3	at Green Bay Packers	**W** 38–10	7–5	Lambeau Field	Recap
14	December 10	**Buffalo Bills**	**L** 13–31	7–6	Giants Stadium	Recap
15	December 17	at Minnesota Vikings	**W** 26–13	8–6	Hubert H. Humphrey Metrodome	Recap
16	December 25	at **Miami Dolphins**	**W** 13–10	9–6	Dolphin Stadium	Recap
17	December 31	Oakland Raiders	**W** 23–3	10–6	Giants Stadium	Recap

Note: Intra-division opponents are in bold text.

=== Standings ===
AFC East
	W	L	T	PCT	DIV	CONF	PF	PA	STK
^{(4)} New England Patriots	12	4	0	.750	4–2	8–4	385	237	W3
^{(5)} New York Jets	10	6	0	.625	4–2	7–5	316	295	W3
Buffalo Bills	7	9	0	.438	3–3	5–7	300	311	L2
Miami Dolphins	6	10	0	.375	1–5	3–9	260	283	L3

== Regular season game summaries ==
=== Week 1: at Tennessee Titans ===
Quarter	1	2	3	4	Total
Jets	0	13	3	7	23
Titans	0	0	0	16	16

at LP Field, Nashville, Tennessee

- Game time: 1:00 PM EDT/12:00 PM CDT
- Game weather: 85 °F or 29.4 °C (Partly cloudy)
- Game attendance: 69,143
- Referee: Gene Steratore
- TV announcers (CBS): Ian Eagle and Solomon Wilcots

==== Game summary ====
After the teams traded punts on the first four possessions of the game, Pennington led the Jets on a 9-play, 76-yard drive, aided by a pass-interference call on Titans linebacker Peter Sirmon that negated an interception by defensive back Reynaldo Hill, capped off by a 1-yard touchdown run from Kevan Barlow.

After another Titans punt, Tennessee head coach Jeff Fisher grew impatient with starting quarterback Kerry Collins, pulling him in favor of rookie quarterback Vince Young. Young drove the Titans to the Jets’ 32-yard line, but underthrew receiver David Givens on the next play, and Andre Dyson intercepted. Pennington drove the Jets into the Titans’ red zone, completing a 10-yard pass to Sean Ryan, but Ryan was hit hard by Keith Bulluck and fumbled, with Tennessee recovering. However, two plays later, the Jets would get the ball right back, as Collins, inserted back into the game, was intercepted by Dyson, his second of the quarter. Setting up shop at the Titans’ 36-yard line, the Jets would capitalize, as Pennington threw an 8-yard touchdown pass to Jerricho Cotchery with 18 seconds left in the first half, but kicker Mike Nugent shanked the extra-point attempt wide right to leave the Jets with a 13–0 halftime lead.

When the second half started, Collins was intercepted again, this time by Kerry Rhodes, who returned the ball 25 yards to the Tennessee 22. Nugent nailed an 18-yard field goal as the drive stalled at the one-yard line. On the Jets’ next possession, Pennington drove to the red zone again, but Nugent missed a 34-yard field goal attempt wide right. On the Jets’ next possession, Pennington appeared to find Cotchery on a 2-yard touchdown pass, but the touchdown was nullified by a holding penalty on D'Brickashaw Ferguson. When the drive stalled, Nugent missed another field goal, hitting the right upright from 30 yards out.

Tennessee finally capitalized, with Travis Henry scoring on a 3-yard touchdown run with 10:48 left in the game. Tennessee went for two, and brought in Young. Young's pass intended for Bobby Wade was incomplete, but Jets defensive back Derrick Strait was flagged for pass interference, giving the Titans second life. They would take advantage, with Collins handing off to Henry for the conversion. After a trade of punts, the Jets took over on their own 11 with 7:28 to go. On third down, Pennington was sacked by Cortland Finnegan, and Tennessee's Randy Starks recovered at New York's 1-yard line. Tennessee went for two and converted, with Collins finding Drew Bennett open, and the game was tied, 16–16.

The Jets came right back, first with Justin Miller returning the ensuing kickoff 41 yards, and then Pennington steadily driving downfield, finding Baker on the 12-yard touchdown pass to cap a 7-play, 57-yard drive. The Jets had to hold on because on the next possession, Collins found Bennett on a 26-yard completion moving the ball to midfield, and he then completed long passes to Ben Troupe and Wade to move the ball to the Jets’ 12-yard line with 1:11 to play. The Jets locked down, and on 4th-and-6 from the Jets’ 8-yard line, Collins’ pass for Bo Scaife was knocked away by Rhodes, ending the game.

==== Scoring Summary ====
Second quarter

- NYJ – Barlow 1 run (Nugent kick), 13:17. NYJ 7–0
- NYJ – Cotchery 8 pass from Pennington (kick failed), :17. NYJ 13–0

Third quarter

- NYJ – FG Nugent 18, 12:47. NYJ 16–0

Fourth quarter

- TEN – Henry 3 run (Henry run), 10:46. NYJ 16–8
- TEN – Henry 1 run (Bennett pass from Collins), 5:58. Tied 16–16
- NYJ – Baker 12 pass from Pennington (Nugent kick), 2:10. NYJ 23–16

=== Week 2: vs. New England Patriots ===
Quarter	1	2	3	4	Total
Patriots	7	10	7	0	24
Jets	0	0	14	3	17

at The Meadowlands, East Rutherford, New Jersey

- Game time: 4:15 PM EDT
- Game weather: 84 °F or 28.9 °C (Sunny)
- Game attendance: 77,595
- Referee: Scott Green
- TV announcers (CBS): Dick Enberg and Randy Cross

In the week leading up to the matchup of 1–0 teams, bad blood brewed between the two teams when the Patriots filed tampering charges against the Jets for former wide receiver Deion Branch. The Patriots stated that while the Jets had permission to negotiate a contract with Branch, any trade talks were to be solely between the teams. They claimed that because Branch and his representatives had knowledge of what was being offered in a trade, the Patriots’ negotiating position was compromised.

==== Game summary ====
After both teams punted on their first possessions, Patriots quarterback Tom Brady led the Patriots on an 11-play, 82-yard drive, capped by Corey Dillon’s 1-yard touchdown run. Following another Jets punt, Brady led New England on an 87-yard drive capped by rookie kicker Stephen Gostkowski’s 20-yard field goal and a 10–0 lead. The game turned when Jets punter Ben Graham shanked a 10-yard punt booting from his own 40, giving Brady and the Patriots the ball at midfield with 1:01 to go in the half. Aided by big completions to Troy Brown (14 yards) and Benjamin Watson (23 yards), with 20 seconds to play, Brady found Chad Jackson on a 13-yard touchdown pass.

On the Jets’ first drive of the second half, they were faced with a 4th-and-1 from their own 46-yard line. Coach Eric Mangini risked going for it, but running back Kevan Barlow was stopped at the line for no gain. Aided by two costly Jets penalties, a pass-interference call on Victor Hobson and a defensive holding call on Erik Coleman, New England drove to the Jets’ 1-yard line, where rookie running back Laurence Maroney punched the ball in for a 24–0 Patriots lead.

But, the dormant Jets offense finally woke up. On a 3rd-and-13 from their own 29-yard line, Chad Pennington completed a deep pass downfield to Jerricho Cotchery, who had to backpedal and leap for the ball as Pennington scrambled out of the pocket. He was hit hard by the Patriots’ Chad Scott, and fell on top of the Patriots’ Eugene Wilson. Hearing no whistle, he sprang up and ran untouched to the end zone. New England's challenge of the touchdown was upheld, as only Cotchery's hand hit the ground. Brady was intercepted by David Barrett, and on the ensuing possession, Pennington found Laveranues Coles on a slant pattern across the middle. Coles juked, causing Eugene Wilson to slip, and then outran the Patriots to the end zone to make it a 24–14 game with 50 seconds left in the third quarter.

The Jets’ rejuvenated defense caused Brady to fumble on New England's next possession, with Kerry Rhodes sacking and Bryan Thomas recovering at the Patriots’ 49-yard line. The Jets converted the opportunity into a 42-yard field goal from Mike Nugent, and suddenly, the Jets only trailed by a touchdown. However, when New England got the ball back with 9:14 to go on their own 30, they steadily wore the Jets down. Brady converted three third downs as the Patriots drove to the Jets’ 12-yard line with 1:11 to go, and a chip-shot field goal away from icing the game. However, kicker Gostkowski was blocked by Jonathan Vilma, who returned the ball to the Jets’ 9-yard line. With no timeouts and 1:05 to go, the Jets moved the ball to their own 45-yard line, but Pennington's heave with 15 seconds left was tipped and intercepted by Tedy Bruschi to effectively end the game.

==== Scoring Summary ====
First quarter

- NE – Dillon 1 run (Gostkowski kick), 5:36.

Second quarter

- NE – FG Gostkowski 20, 13:15.
- NE – Jackson 13 pass from Brady (Gostkowski kick), :14.

Third quarter

- NE – Maroney 1 run (Gostkowski kick), 8:57.
- NYJ – Cotchery 71 pass from Pennington (Nugent kick), 6:15.
- NYJ – Coles 46 pass from Pennington (Nugent kick), :50.

Fourth quarter

- NYJ – FG Nugent 42, 9:20.

=== Week 3: at Buffalo Bills ===
Quarter	1	2	3	4	Total
Jets	0	14	7	7	28
Bills	7	3	0	10	20

at Ralph Wilson Stadium, Orchard Park, New York

- Game time: 1:00 PM EDT
- Game weather: 65 °F or 18.3 °C (Partly cloudy)
- Game attendance: 72,067
- Referee: Jerome Boger
- TV announcers (CBS): Dick Enberg and Randy Cross

==== Game summary ====
On Buffalo's first play, J. P. Losman found Peerless Price for an 18-yard completion. They finished their next play with a bang, as Losman found Roscoe Parrish for a short completion, who then juked past a defender and sprinted into the end zone for a 7–0 Bills lead just 55 seconds into the game. After a Jets punt, Buffalo moved the ball to the Jets’ 35-yard line, but on a fake field goal, holder Brian Moorman threw an incomplete pass. After another Jets punt, Buffalo moved the ball to the Jets’ 19-yard line, but Losman was sacked by Kerry Rhodes, and Jonathan Vilma scooped up the loose ball. On Buffalo's next possession, following another Jets punt, Buffalo gambled and went for it on 4th-and-3 from the Jets’ 28-yard line, but Losman's pass to Josh Reed only picked up two yards. The Jets capitalized, with rookie running back Leon Washington turning a short pass into a 46-yard gain to the Buffalo 3-yard line, where Kevan Barlow ran it in to tie the game, 7–7.

But Buffalo used a 32-yard run by Willis McGahee to move into Jets territory, and Rian Lindell booted a 36-yard field goal. Following a trade of punts, the Jets took over at their own 33 with 2:43 left in the first half. Operating out of a no-huddle offense, Pennington quickly drove the Jets downfield, finding Laveranues Coles and Jerricho Cotchery for big completions of 10+ yards before Pennington found Chris Baker open on a 1-yard touchdown pass with 14 seconds left in the half to give the Jets a 14–10 halftime lead.

Buffalo forced a punt on the Jets’ first possession of the second half, but with the ball on their own 33-yard line, Losman was sacked by Kerry Rhodes, and Victor Hobson picked it up and raced into the end zone for a 32-yard fumble return touchdown. Rhodes’ second sack forced a fumble in the game and third in the last two games. Late in the third quarter, Losman turned the ball over again, getting intercepted by David Barrett. However, Losman found Josh Reed open on a 31-yard completion to set up a 28-yard field goal by Lindell with 9:17 left in the game. The Jets appeared to put the game away on the next possession, with Cedric Houston scoring his first touchdown of the season on a 5-yard run with 3:26 to play. However, Losman rallied Buffalo, finding Peerless Price and Lee Evans on long completions before running the ball into the end zone from 12 yards out on a scramble to cut the Jets’ lead to 28–20. On the ensuing onside kick, Buffalo caught a break, as Lindell's onside kick bounced off the elbow of Jets linebacker Matt Chatham, and André Davis recovered. However, Buffalo could not get a first down, ending the game.

==== Scoring Summary ====
First quarter

- BUF – Parrish 51 pass from Losman (Lindell kick), 14:05.

Second quarter

- NYJ – Barlow 3 run (Nugent kick), 10:17.
- BUF – FG Lindell 36, 0:52.
- NYJ – Baker 1 pass from Pennington (Nugent kick), :14.

Third quarter

- NYJ – Hobson 32 fumble return (Nugent kick), 10:05.

Fourth quarter

- BUF – FG Lindell 36, 9:14.
- NYJ – Houston 5 run (Nugent kick), 3:20.
- BUF – Losman 12 run (Lindell kick), 1:15.

=== Week 4: vs Indianapolis Colts ===
Quarter	1	2	3	4	Total
Colts	7	7	0	17	31
Jets	0	14	0	14	28

at The Meadowlands, East Rutherford, New Jersey

- Game time: 1:00 PM EDT/12:00 PM CDT
- Game weather: 62 °F or 16.7 °C (Cloudy)
- Game attendance: 77,190
- Referee: Gerry Austin
- TV announcers (CBS): Greg Gumbel and Dan Dierdorf

==== Game summary ====
On the game's first possession, Chad Pennington was sacked by Robert Mathis, fumbled, and the Colts’ Josh Thomas recovered. Dominic Rhodes would score on a 6-yard touchdown run minutes later. The teams would trade punts for the rest of the first quarter before Pennington drove the Jets at the beginning of the second quarter, using long completions to Laveranues Coles and Tim Dwight before he found Jerricho Cotchery on a 33-yard touchdown pass. What happened next stunned the Colts: Mike Nugent tried an onside kick and Kerry Rhodes recovered, sparking the home crowd. The Jets would make that surprise work, as Kevan Barlow scored on a 1-yard touchdown run with 4:44 left in the first half, and the Jets had a 14–7 lead. However, Peyton Manning rallied the Colts, converting a key third down to Marvin Harrison before Joseph Addai scored on a 2-yard touchdown run to tie the score going to halftime.

Indianapolis punted to open the second half, and the Jets began to drive. Pennington converted three third downs on a drive that took nearly nine minutes off the clock. Jets coach Eric Mangini tried his second gamble of the game: going for it on 4th-and-goal from the Colts’ 2-yard line. However, Pennington's pass was intercepted in the end zone by Rocky Boiman, the first time in his career Pennington was intercepted in the end zone. Boiman's interception would set up a fast-and-furious finish as the teams scored 31 points in the fourth quarter.

Indianapolis took advantage of Boiman's interception and drove to set up Martin Gramatica’s 20-yard field goal, as Joseph Addai picked up big yardage on the drive. Using a no-huddle offense, Pennington drove the Jets downfield, and aided by an illegal contact penalty on the Colts’ Mike Doss, scored the go-ahead touchdown as Kevan Barlow scored on a 5-yard run with 7:55 to play. Manning led the Colts right back, and aided by a pass-interference penalty on Justin Miller, found Bryan Fletcher on a 2-yard touchdown pass with 2:40 to play. On the ensuing kickoff, Miller ran the ball back 103 yards for a touchdown that sent Jets fans into hysteria. The Jets led 28–24 with 2:20 to play. However, that would be enough time for Manning, converting a huge third down to Marvin Harrison and a 15-yard pass to Reggie Wayne going to the Jets’ 1-yard line. Manning ran the ball up the middle on the next play to give the Colts the lead.

With eight seconds to play and the ball on the Jets’ 32-yard line, Pennington completed a seemingly innocuous pass to Leon Washington. However, what followed was an attempt to pull off a miracle. In order, the Jets tried a series of several laterals, going from Washington, to Brad Smith, to Laveranues Coles, to Pennington, to Justin McCareins, back to Smith, who fumbled but recovered. He lateraled back to Coles, who fumbled but recovered. At this point, the Jets were at the Colts’ 40-yard line. Coles ran down 13 yards and then tossed off to Nick Mangold, who fumbled, but this time, the Colts’ Jason David recovered, ending the game.

==== Scoring Summary ====
First quarter

- IND – Rhodes 6 run (Gramatica kick), 12:28.

Second quarter

- NYJ – Cotchery 33 pass from Pennington (Nugent kick), 10:10.
- NYJ – Barlow 1 run (Nugent kick), 4:44.
- IND – Addai 2 run (Gramatica kick), :16.

Fourth quarter

- IND – FG Gramatica 20, 12:58.
- NYJ – Barlow 5 run (Nugent kick), 7:55.
- IND – Fletcher 2 pass from Manning (Gramatica kick), 2:34.
- NYJ – Miller 103 kickoff return (Nugent kick), 2:20.
- IND – Manning 1 run (Gramatica kick), 1:30.

=== Week 5: at Jacksonville Jaguars ===
Quarter	1	2	3	4	Total
Jets	0	0	0	0	0
Jaguars	14	14	10	3	41

at Alltel Stadium, Jacksonville, Florida

- Game time: 4:05 PM EDT
- Game weather: 75 °F (23.9 °C)
- Game attendance: 66,604
- Referee: Tony Corrente
- TV announcers (CBS): Dick Enberg and Randy Cross

==== Game summary ====
For the third straight week, the game got off to a poor start for the Jets, as Chad Pennington was intercepted by Brian Williams on the Jets’ first possession. Byron Leftwich then completed a short pass to Fred Taylor, who turned it into a 32-yard gain. Two plays later, Maurice Jones-Drew scored on a 6-yard touchdown run. After forcing a punt, Leftwich completed passes to Reggie Williams and George Wrighster for long gains. Taylor would then score on a 13-yard touchdown run for a 14–0 Jaguars lead.

Early in the second quarter, the Jets attempted a punt, but the Jaguars’ Gerald Sensabaugh blocked it, and Jorge Cordova recovered at the Jets’ 8-yard line. Three plays later, Jones-Drew scored on a 4-yard touchdown run, surviving a challenge by the Jets. From there, Pennington was intercepted by Terry Cousin on the next possession, and Leftwich flipped a 1-yard touchdown pass to Wrighster.

Jacksonville would add a Josh Scobee 43-yard field goal early in the second half, and after Deon Grant intercepted Pennington, Leftwich threw a 16-yard touchdown pass to Williams for a 38–0 lead. The Jets’ lone scoring chance in the second half was stopped when Leon Washington was stuffed on a 4th-and-goal from the Jaguars’ 1-yard line early in the fourth quarter. The Jets were stopped on fourth down on their next possession when Pennington's scramble fell a yard short, and Scobee added a 40-yard field goal to close the scoring. On the Jets’ final possession, backup rookie quarterback Kellen Clemens made his first appearance under center, but he was sacked by Montavious Stanley, and Nick Greisen recovered.

==== Scoring Summary ====
First quarter

- JAX – Jones-Drew 6 run (Scobee kick), 9:44.
- JAX – Taylor 13 run (Scobee kick), 4:44.

Second quarter

- JAX – Jones-Drew 4 run (Scobee kick), 12:52.
- JAX – Wrighster 1 pass from Leftwich, 7:10.

Third quarter

- JAX – FG Scobee 43, 10:52.
- JAX – Williams 16 pass from Leftwich (Scobee kick), 8:50.

Fourth quarter

- JAX – FG Scobee 40, 2:42.

=== Week 6: vs. Miami Dolphins ===
Quarter	1	2	3	4	Total
Dolphins	0	0	3	14	17
Jets	3	0	10	7	20

at The Meadowlands, East Rutherford, New Jersey

- Game time: 4:15 EDT
- Game weather: 57 °F or 13.9 °C (Clear)
- Game attendance: 77,439
- Referee: Terry McAulay
- TV announcers (CBS): Jim Nantz and Phil Simms

==== Game summary ====
The Jets got off to a good start in this game, with Mike Nugent kicking a 33-yard field goal on the Jets’ first possession, their first points in the first quarter all season. The defense was a force early, a week after being trashed in the 41–0 loss to Jacksonville, as Andre Dyson intercepted Miami quarterback Joey Harrington on the next possession. After a punt, the Jets again forced a turnover, as Victor Hobson picked Harrington off. Midway through the second quarter, Miami gambled on a 4th-and-1 from the Jets’ 29-yard line, but Ronnie Brown was stopped. The game went to halftime still 3–0 Jets.

Pennington led the Jets on a long drive to open the second half, capped off by another 33-yard field goal by Nugent. Miami came right back, driving inside the Jets’ red zone, but the defense held firm, holding Miami to an Olindo Mare 21-yard field goal. After a good kick return by Justin Miller, Pennington turned a short completion to Laveranues Coles into a 58-yard touchdown as Coles found an opening and raced to the end zone for a 13–3 Jets lead. After Sammy Morris fumbled on the next possession for Miami, Pennington found Coles on a 22-yard touchdown pass to open up a 17-point lead with 13:23 to play.

Miami came right back, however, with Harrington leading the Dolphins quickly downfield on a 12-play, 81-yard drive, capped by a 2-yard touchdown toss to Chris Chambers. After forcing a punt, Harrington again led Miami downfield, using an 11-play, 74-yard drive to pull Miami within 20–17, as Ronnie Brown scored on a 1-yard run. After another punt, Miami took over on their own 11-yard line with 2:18 to play. Harrington used big completions to Randy McMichael and Chambers to move to the Jets’ 32-yard line with 38 seconds to play, but Mare's game-tying 51-yard attempt was well short, sealing the victory for New York.

==== Scoring Summary ====
First quarter

- NYJ – FG Nugent 33, 9:30.

Third quarter

- NYJ – FG Nugent 33, 9:04.
- MIA – FG Mare 21, 4:24.
- NYJ – Coles 58 pass from Pennington (Nugent kick), 3:23.

Fourth quarter

- NYJ – Coles 22 pass from Pennington (Nugent kick), 13:15.
- MIA – Chambers 2 pass from Harrington (Mare kick), 8:49.
- MIA – Brown 1 run (Mare kick), 2:56.

=== Week 7: vs. Detroit Lions ===
Quarter	1	2	3	4	Total
Lions	0	7	3	14	24
Jets	14	7	0	10	31

at The Meadowlands, East Rutherford, New Jersey

- Game time: 1:00 PM EDT
- Game weather: 57 °F or 13.9 °C (Hazy)
- Game attendance: 76,953
- Referee: Bill Carollo
- TV announcers (Fox): Sam Rosen and Tim Ryan

==== Game summary ====
The Jets quickly drove downfield on their first possession, scoring their first touchdown in the first quarter all season. Chad Pennington found Jerricho Cotchery on a 28-yard completion and rookie running back Leon Washington picked up 23 yards on a sweep around end before Washington scored on a 5-yard touchdown run. On the Jets’ next possession, Pennington fired a 44-yard touchdown pass to Justin McCareins, his first touchdown of the season, to open up a 14–0 lead. The Lions would get on the board early in the second quarter as Jon Kitna had big completions to Dan Campbell, Mike Furrey, and Roy Williams, the pass to Williams a 22-yard touchdown. However, on the kickoff, Justin Miller returned the ball 56 yards inside Detroit territory, and after a pass from Pennington to Cotchery, Kevan Barlow scored on a 3-yard touchdown run. Kitna would get intercepted by Kerry Rhodes on the next possession, but Pennington would then get picked off by Terrence Holt at the Detroit 2-yard line to short-circuit a possible score. The Jets led 21–7 at halftime.

Kitna would again get intercepted on the first possession of the second half, this time by Jonathan Vilma. However, the drive went nowhere, and Detroit's next one, a 12-play, 83-yard drive, resulted in a 25-yard field goal by Jason Hanson. The Jets got that right back, as Pennington converted a couple of third downs during a drive that was capped by Mike Nugent’s 33-yard field goal. Down fourteen points, Detroit halved New York’s lead with Kitna finding Kevin Jones on a 9-yard touchdown pass on a drive where Kitna converted a critical 4th-and-11 pass to Mike Furrey. The Jets would come right back, with Washington scoring on a 16-yard touchdown run on a sweep around end. Detroit would not give up, as Kitna found Furrey on an 18-yard touchdown pass on a play that survived a Jets challenge. On that drive, Kitna again converted a fourth down to Furrey. However, Detroit’s ensuing onside kick failed, and the Jets ran out the clock.

==== Scoring Summary ====
First quarter

- NYJ – Washington 5 run (Nugent kick), 12:15.
- NYJ – McCareins 44 pass from Pennington (Nugent kick), 4:02. (14–0 NYJ)

Second quarter

- DET – Williams 22 pass from Kitna (Hanson kick), 7:54.
- NYJ – Barlow 2 run (Nugent kick), 5:28.

Third quarter

- DET – FG Hanson 25, 4:57.

Fourth quarter

- NYJ – FG Nugent 33, 14:20.
- DET – Jones 9 pass from Kitna (Hanson kick), 9:09.
- NYJ – Washington 16 run (Nugent kick), 4:51.
- DET – Furrey 22 pass from Kitna (Hanson kick), 2:22.

=== Week 8: at Cleveland Browns ===
Quarter	1	2	3	4	Total
Jets	3	0	7	3	13
Browns	3	7	10	0	20

at Cleveland Browns Stadium, Cleveland, Ohio

- Game time: 4:15 PM EST
- Game weather: 46 °F or 7.8 °C (Clear)
- Game attendance: 72,507
- Referee: Mike Carey
- TV announcers (CBS): Ian Eagle and Solomon Wilcots

==== Game summary ====
The Jets got the ball first and Pennington led the Jets on a 16-play, 83-yard drive that took 8:30 off the clock before Mike Nugent kicked a 27-yard field goal. On the Browns’ next possession, Reuben Droughns had two big gains to put the Browns in position for Phil Dawson’s 47-yard field goal, knotting the score, 3–3. Pennington was then intercepted by Sean Jones, and Charlie Frye led the Browns on a long drive that was capped by a 2-yard touchdown run by Droughns. Frye would get intercepted by Eric Smith on the Browns’ next possession, but Nugent missed a 52-yard field goal wide right, his first missed field goal since Week 1. However, the Jets would get a break as Dawson missed a chip-shot 26-yard field goal at the end of the first half. Still, Cleveland led 10–3 at halftime.

Cleveland got the ball first in the second half, and Droughns continued to move the ball, picking up solid yardage before Frye found Kellen Winslow II open on a 30-yard touchdown reception. After the teams traded punts, Leon Washington fumbled on the Jets’ 10-yard line, with Nick Eason forcing and Kamerion Wimbley recovering. Dawson knocked in a 21-yard field goal to give Cleveland a 20–3 lead with 3:51 left in the third quarter. The Jets got an immediate lift when Justin Miller returned the ensuing kickoff 99 yards for a score, his second return of the year, to cut the lead to ten. After a Browns punt, Pennington drove the Jets into position for Nugent's 47-yard field goal to narrow the deficit to 20–13. However, on the Jets’ next possession, Pennington was again intercepted by Jones, but Cleveland was forced to punt.

After another trade of punts, the Jets took over on Cleveland's 47-yard line with 1:56 to play. On 4th-and-4 from the Cleveland 24 with 1:06 to play, Pennington lofted a pass that Chris Baker leapt for and caught with one hand as he began to land. Just before his foot hit the ground, the Browns’ Brodney Pool levelled Baker, who landed out-of-bounds but still in possession of the ball. The referee ruled that Baker was out-of-bounds, rather than ruling he was forced out, which would have led to a touchdown. Eric Mangini called a timeout in the hopes that the referees would review the play, but since it was a judgement call, it was non-reviewable under NFL rules. Frye took a knee to end the game.

==== Scoring Summary ====
First quarter

- NYJ – FG Nugent 33, 6:30.
- CLE – FG Dawson 47, 2:55.

Second quarter

- CLE – Droughns 2 run (Dawson kick), 10:00.

Third quarter

- CLE – Winslow II 30 pass from Frye (Dawson kick), 11:16.
- CLE – FG Dawson 21, 3:48.
- NYJ – Miller 99 kickoff return (Nugent kick), 3:35.

Fourth quarter

- NYJ – FG Nugent 47, 12:54.

=== Week 10: at New England Patriots ===
Quarter	1	2	3	4	Total
Jets	0	7	3	7	17
Patriots	0	6	0	8	14

at Gillette Stadium, Foxboro, Massachusetts

- Game time: 1:00 PM EST
- Game weather: 58 °F or 14.4 °C (rain)
- Game attendance: 68,756
- Referee: Peter Morelli
- TV announcers (CBS): Jim Nantz and Phil Simms

==== Game summary ====
On a rainy day in New England, both teams’ defenses held firm early, with the teams trading punts until New England went on a drive that reached one play into the second quarter, when Stephen Gostkowski booted a 31-yard field goal. On the Jets’ next play from scrimmage, Chad Pennington was intercepted by Artrell Hawkins. Two plays later, Tom Brady found Doug Gabriel open downfield for a long first down, but Victor Hobson forced a fumble and Kerry Rhodes recovered. The Jets followed with a time-consuming 16-play, 9:12 drive, capped off by a two-yard Kevan Barlow touchdown run for a 7–3 Jets lead.

New England battled downfield, converting a 4th-and-1 from their own 44 with a run to fullback Heath Evans, and on the first play after the two-minute warning, Brady appeared to be intercepted by Drew Coleman, who ran the ball back 35 yards. However, the play was negated on a controversial roughing-the-passer call on Hobson, who dove at Brady as he was releasing the ball, but drove him into the ground, prompting the flag. The Patriots then converted on a 4th-and-3 from the Jets’ 24, but settled for a 21-yard field goal from Gostkowski with four seconds left.

Justin Miller ran back the opening kickoff of the second half 62 yards, and the drive ended with Pennington lining up in the shotgun on 4th-and-5 from the Patriots’ 33, only to punt the ball to the New England 4. After a Patriots punt, Pennington led the Jets on another long drive, this one 15 plays and only 45 yards, but it ate 6:40 off the clock and resulted in Nugent's 34-yard field goal. Midway through the fourth quarter, Brady was intercepted by Erik Coleman, and Pennington tossed a 22-yard touchdown pass to Jerricho Cotchery, barely keeping his feet inbounds, although the play was never challenged. The Jets led 17–6 with 4:51 to go.

However, operating out of a no-huddle offense, Brady led the Patriots 61 yards in 31 seconds, capped by a 15-yard touchdown pass to Reche Caldwell, and Brady found Caldwell again on the two-point conversion to narrow the lead to 17–14. The next drive was critical, as the Jets forced New England to use all three timeouts, punting with 1:15 to go. New England took over at their own 11-yard line and moved the ball to the Jets’ 46-yard line. On the final play of the game, Brady was sacked by Shaun Ellis.

==== Scoring summary ====
Second quarter

- NE – FG Gostkowski 31, 14:56.
- NYJ – Barlow 2 run (Nugent kick), 4:43.
- NE – FG Gostkowski 21, :04.

Third quarter

- NYJ – FG Nugent 34, 1:46.

Fourth quarter

- NYJ – Cotchery 22 pass from Pennington (Nugent kick), 4:45.
- NE – Caldwell 15 pass from Brady (Caldwell pass from Brady), 4:14.

=== Week 11: vs. Chicago Bears ===
Quarter	1	2	3	4	Total
Bears	0	0	3	7	10
Jets	0	0	0	0	0

at The Meadowlands, East Rutherford, New Jersey

- Game time: 1:00 PM EST
- Game weather: 47 °F or 8.3 °C (Overcast)
- Game attendance: 77,632
- Referee: Gene Steratore
- TV announcers (Fox): Joe Buck and Troy Aikman

==== Game summary ====
The first quarter was all about defense, as the teams traded punts until the Jets got the ball late in the first quarter at their own 24-yard line. On the drive, Chad Pennington converted key third downs to Brad Smith and Tim Dwight, and was soon faced with a 3rd-and-goal at the Bears’ 6-yard line. Apparently unable to see an open Laveranues Coles, Pennington lobbed a pass towards Chris Baker that was intercepted by Brian Urlacher. With just under four minutes left in the half, Thomas Jones appeared to fumble and Kerry Rhodes recovered, but Chicago successfully challenged the play, denying the Jets a scoring opportunity. The game was scoreless at halftime.

Eric Mangini opened the second half with an onside kick, like his surprise onside kick against Indianapolis in Week 4. Unfortunately, this one was scooped up by Chicago's Chris Harris. On the Bears’ first play, Jones broke off a 19-yard run, and Jones rushed every play on the drive that was capped off by a 20-yard field goal by Robbie Gould. The Jets’ next drive ended when Pennington was intercepted by Nathan Vasher in Chicago territory. The Bears’ game-breaking score came when Rex Grossman completed a short pass to Mark Bradley. The Jets’ Drew Coleman fell down attempting to make the tackle, and Bradley had an open lane to the end zone to extend the Bears’ lead to 10–0. The Bears then went into a ball-control offense, and the Jets could not muster anything.

==== Scoring Summary ====
Third quarter

- CHI – FG Gould 20, 10:39.

Fourth quarter

- CHI – Bradley 57 pass from Grossman (Gould kick), 14:50.

=== Week 12: vs. Houston Texans ===
Quarter	1	2	3	4	Total
Texans	0	3	0	8	11
Jets	3	6	14	3	26

at The Meadowlands, East Rutherford, New Jersey

- Game time: 1:00 PM EST
- Game weather: 56 °F or 13.3 °C (Clear)
- Game attendance: 76,596
- Referee: Bill Leavy
- TV announcers (CBS): Gus Johnson and Steve Tasker

==== Game summary ====
The game started out with the teams trading punts, and when Houston attempted a punt from the Jets’ 37-yard line, punter Chad Stanley fumbled the snap and the Jets had the ball at their own 46-yard line. A 36-yard completion from Chad Pennington to Laveranues Coles almost went for naught when Leon Washington fumbled a short pass, but Brad Smith recovered. Mike Nugent booted a 23-yard field goal to put the Jets on the board. On the Jets’ next drive, Pennington led the Jets into Houston territory, aided by a pass-interference call on DeMarcus Faggins. Nugent kicked a 34-yard field goal for a 6–0 Jets lead. Houston rebounded, with David Carr converting a key third down to Andre Johnson to set up Kris Brown’s 47-yard field goal. Pennington completed a long pass to Jerricho Cotchery on the next drive to set up Nugent’s career-long 54-yard field goal to give the Jets a 9–3 lead. The half ended when Brown came up five yards short on a 59-yard field goal attempt.

On the Jets’ first possession of the second half, following a Houston punt, Pennington completed long passes to Chris Baker and Cotchery before finding Coles on a 12-yard touchdown pass. On the Jets’ next drive, fans everywhere held their breath when Pennington was drilled by Mario Williams while releasing a pass and was slow to get up. Luckily, he only had the wind knocked out of him. Kerry Rhodes intercepted Carr soon after, and Pennington completed another long pass to Cotchery to set up Cedric Houston’s 1-yard touchdown run and a 23–3 lead. The Jets’ final score came after a 13-play drive that ate up 8:27, capped by Nugent's 40-yard field goal, his fourth of the game. Houston closed the scoring when Carr found Johnson in the end zone, and then completed a two-point conversion pass to Wali Lundy.

==== Scoring Summary ====
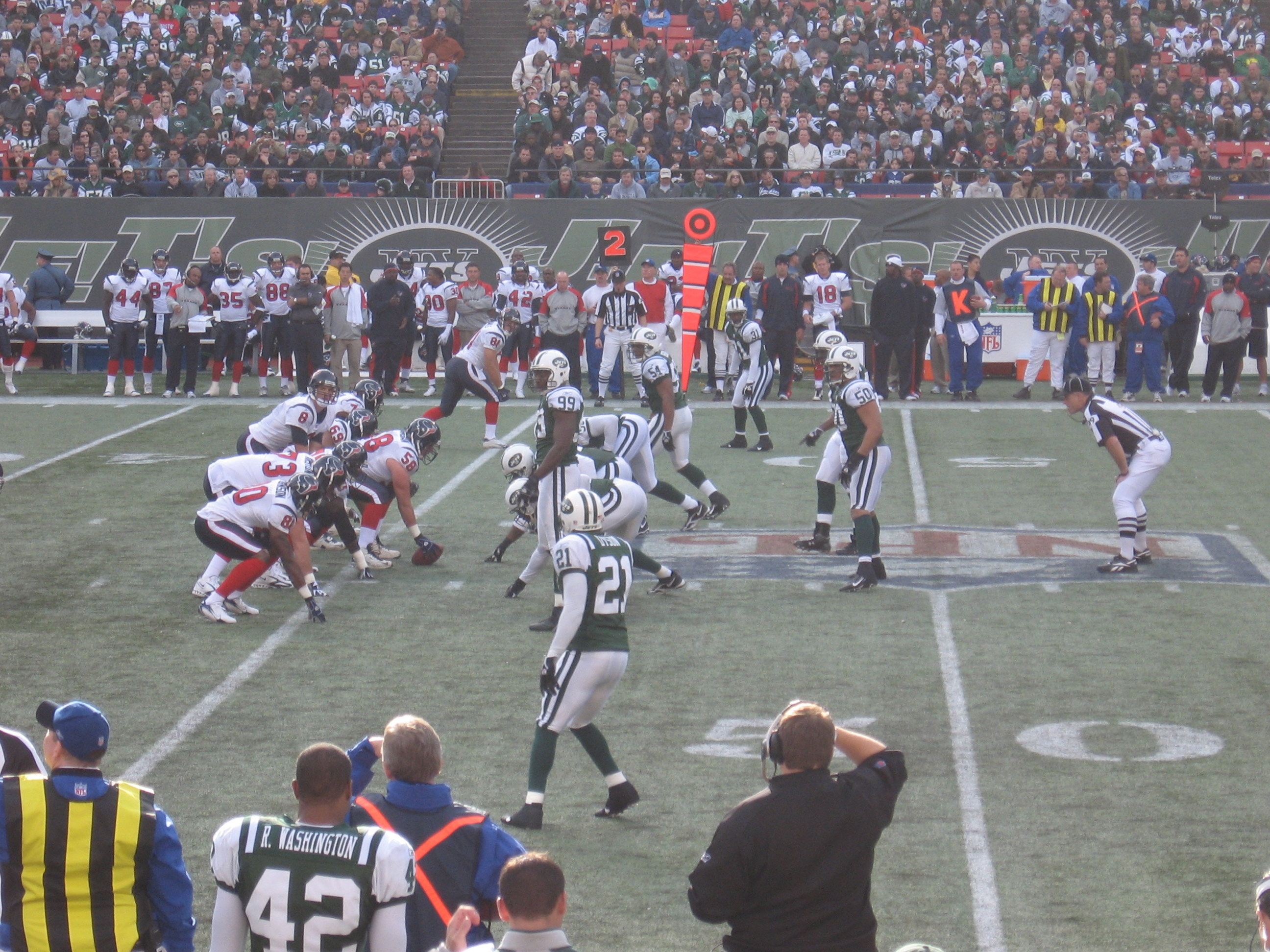
The Texans on offense at the Meadowlands in week 12 of 2006

First quarter

- NYJ – FG Nugent 23, 1:25.

Second quarter

- NYJ – FG Nugent 34, 9:46.
- HOU – FG Brown 47, 4:59.
- NYJ – FG Nugent 54, 1:09.

Third quarter

- NYJ – Coles 12 pass from Pennington (Nugent kick), 9:00.
- NYJ – Houston 1 run (Nugent kick), 3:33.

Fourth quarter

- NYJ – FG Nugent 40, 8:05.
- HOU – Johnson 3 pass from Carr (Carr pass to Lundy), 3:54.

=== Week 13: at Green Bay Packers ===
Quarter	1	2	3	4	Total
Jets	10	21	0	7	38
Packers	0	0	10	0	10

at Lambeau Field, Green Bay, Wisconsin

- Game time: 1:00 PM EST/12:00 PM CST
- Game weather: 19 °F or −7.2 °C (Snow flurries)
- Game attendance: 70,527
- Referee: Larry Nemmers
- TV announcers (CBS): Jim Nantz and Phil Simms

==== Game summary ====
On the game's opening drive, Pennington drove the Jets downfield, aided by a key third-down completion to Justin McCareins, capped by Mike Nugent’s 24-yard field goal. On the next possession, Bryan Thomas sacked Brett Favre, causing a fumble while Dewayne Robertson recovered for the Jets. Out of a no-huddle offense, Pennington quickly engineered a scoring drive, a 12-yard touchdown pass to Jerricho Cotchery.

After a Packers punt, Pennington found Chris Baker and Cotchery on long completions to set up Cedric Houston’s 3-yard touchdown run for a 17–0 Jets lead. Dave Rayner would miss a 40-yard field goal wide right for Green Bay, and the Jets drove to another score, this time a 1-yard touchdown run by Houston. Favre would then get intercepted by Andre Dyson, and the Jets would get fortunate on the next drive, surviving a Laveranues Coles fumble that Cotchery recovered, and Baker had a couple of key grabs on the drive, including a 1-yard touchdown catch with 13 seconds to play in the half for a 31–0 lead.

Out of the gate in the second half, Green Bay resorted to a rushing game, and the first drive worked, with Rayner kicking a 34-yard field goal. Pennington then got intercepted by Charles Woodson. Green Bay could not convert a 4th-and-1 from the New York 33-yard line, but Pennington threw another pick, this time to Patrick Dendy. Green Bay made Pennington pay this time, as Favre found Donald Driver for a 20-yard touchdown to cut the lead to 31–10. Green Bay then recovered the ensuing onside kick, and the Packers had all the momentum. However, the Jets forced a punt and then drove to a touchdown, with Houston picking up a big run and Leon Washington finishing the drive with a 20-yard touchdown run that effectively ended the game.

==== Scoring Summary ====
First quarter

- NYJ – FG Nugent 24, 9:55.
- NYJ – Cotchery 12 pass from Pennington (Nugent kick), 4:45.

Second quarter

- NYJ – Houston 3 run (Nugent kick), 12:40.
- NYJ – Houston 1 run (Nugent kick), 6:17.
- NYJ – Baker 1 pass from Pennington (Nugent kick), :09.

Third quarter

- GB – FG Rayner 34, 8:32.
- GB – Driver 20 pass from Favre (Rayner kick), 1:16.

Fourth quarter

- NYJ – Washington 20 run (Nugent kick), 11:30.

=== Week 14: vs. Buffalo Bills ===
Quarter	1	2	3	4	Total
Bills	7	14	7	3	31
Jets	7	6	0	0	13

at The Meadowlands, East Rutherford, New Jersey

- Game time: 4:15 PM EST
- Game weather: 54 °F or 12.2 °C (Clear)
- Game attendance: 77,131
- Referee: Walt Anderson
- TV announcers (CBS): Ian Eagle and Solomon Wilcots

==== Game summary ====
Buffalo struck first late in the first quarter when Willis McGahee broke through a hole and ran 57 yards to the end zone. Justin Miller put the Jets in good field position with the ensuing kickoff return, and after Chad Pennington found Laveranues Coles on a long completion, he found him on a 10-yard pass for a touchdown, knotting the game at 7. On the next drive, Anthony Thomas fumbled for Buffalo and Miller recovered. Mike Nugent would knock in a 30-yard field goal to give the Jets the lead.

With 4:59 left in the half, J. P. Losman found Lee Evans on a deep pass downfield that went for a 77-yard touchdown. On the first play after the two-minute warning, Pennington was intercepted by Nate Clements, who returned it 42 yards for a score. Nugent would add a 38-yard field goal right before halftime, and the Jets trailed 21–13 at halftime. The defenses held firm for a majority of the third quarter, before Losman found Robert Royal on a 6-yard touchdown pass. Rian Lindell’s 34-yard field goal with 8:04 remaining capped the scoring.

==== Scoring Summary ====
First quarter

- BUF – McGahee 57 run (Lindell kick, 4:22.
- NYJ – Coles 10 pass from Pennington (Nugent kick), 1:08.

Second quarter

- NYJ – FG Nugent 30, 10:58.
- BUF – Evans 77 pass from Losman (Lindell kick), 4:47.
- BUF – Clements 58 interception return (Lindell kick), 1:47.
- NYJ – FG Nugent 38, :01.

Third quarter

- BUF – Royal 6 pass from Losman (Lindell kick), 1:58.

Fourth quarter

- BUF – FG Lindell 34, 7:59.

=== Week 15: at Minnesota Vikings ===
Quarter	1	2	3	4	Total
Jets	7	16	3	0	26
Vikings	7	0	0	6	13

at Hubert H. Humphrey Metrodome, Minneapolis, Minnesota

- Game time: 1:00 PM EST/12:00 PM CST
- Game weather: Indoors (Domed stadium)
- Game attendance: 63,677
- Referee: Bill Vinovich
- TV announcers (CBS): Greg Gumbel and Dan Dierdorf

==== Game summary ====
On the second play of the game, Chad Pennington was sacked by Napoleon Harris, and E. J. Henderson recovered. Three plays later, Brad Johnson tossed a 30-yard touchdown pass to Travis Taylor, and the Jets trailed 7–0 two minutes into the game. The Jets immediately responded, with Brad Smith making a key grab on the drive that ended with Cedric Houston’s 6-yard touchdown run. On the next Jets’ drive, Mike Nugent was ready to attempt a 37-yard field goal, but holder Ben Graham botched the snap, and the Jets could not score. Nugent would make a 25-yard field goal early in the second quarter to give the Jets a 10–7 lead.

Pennington found Jerricho Cotchery and Laveranues Coles for big completions on the drive that ended with Coles grabbing a 21-yard touchdown pass from Pennington. Nugent would make a 52-yard field goal for a 20–7 lead before Ryan Longwell missed a 49-yard field goal wide right for Minnesota, giving the Jets prime field position, and Nugent made a 45-yard field goal as time expired for a 23–7 halftime lead. With a large lead, the Jets controlled the clock in the second half, going on a nearly eight-minute drive that ended with a 20-yard field goal from Nugent, his fourth of the game and the final Jets score.

Johnson was pulled at the beginning of the fourth quarter for backup Tarvaris Jackson, and Jackson led Minnesota on a scoring drive, finding Troy Williamson on two long passes before connecting with Mewelde Moore on a 35-yard touchdown. Both the two-point conversion and ensuing onside kick failed, but Pennington was intercepted by Harris. Jackson led the Vikings to the New York 14-yard line with two minutes to go, but David Barrett intercepted Jackson, effectively ending the game.

==== Scoring Summary ====
First quarter

- MIN – Taylor 30 pass from Johnson (Longwell kick), 12:53.
- NYJ – Houston 6 run (Nugent kick), 6:20.

Second quarter

- NYJ – FG Nugent 25, 11:32.
- NYJ – Coles 21 pass from Pennington (Nugent kick), 6:12.
- NYJ – FG Nugent 52, 2:48.
- NYJ – FG Nugent 45, :02.

Third quarter

- NYJ – FG Nugent 20, 7:41.

Fourth quarter

- MIN – Moore 35 pass from Jackson (pass failed), 6:15.

=== Week 16: at Miami Dolphins ===
Quarter	1	2	3	4	Total
Jets	0	0	3	10	13
Dolphins	0	0	0	10	10

at Dolphin Stadium, Miami Gardens, Florida

- Game time: 8:30 PM EST
- Game weather: 77 °F or 25 °C (Mostly cloudy, rain showers)
- Game attendance: 73,500
- Referee: Gerry Austin
- TV announcers (ESPN): Mike Tirico, Joe Theismann, and Tony Kornheiser

==== Game summary ====
With the rest of Week 16's games being played on Christmas Eve, the Jets, due to losses by Jacksonville and Cincinnati, had two victories.

The game was played in a driving rainstorm as both teams struggled to move the ball early. With 49 seconds remaining in the first quarter, Mike Nugent was ready to attempt a 34-yard field goal, but holder Ben Graham could not handle the snap in the slippery conditions, and the Jets were denied. The two teams would trade punts for the rest of the half.

In the third quarter, Dolphins coach Nick Saban inserted backup quarterback Cleo Lemon into the game, replacing an ineffective Joey Harrington. Finally, the Jets went on a drive with 6:15 left in the third quarter, with Chad Pennington scrambling for 15 yards and moving into the Dolphins’ red zone when Yeremiah Bell was flagged for pass interference. Nugent knocked in a 22-yard field goal for the first points of the game. However, Lemon rallied Miami, completing two long passes to Randy McMichael and Ronnie Brown picking up a long run before Lemon tossed a 7-yard touchdown pass to McMichael, and the Dolphins led 7–3 with 13:26 left in the game.

Pennington led the Jets back to take the lead, completing key passes to Brad Smith and Leon Washington before finding Cotchery on a 31-yard completion to the Miami 1-yard line, but the Jets challenged, saying that Cotchery was brought down after he broke the plane of the end zone, and the referee agreed, giving the Jets a 10–7 lead with 8:04 remaining in the game. Miami was then forced to punt, but caught a break when Donnie Jones' kick bounced off the elbow of Jets linebacker Brad Kassell, and long snapper John Denney recovered at the Jets’ 42-yard line. Lemon led Miami downfield, completing key passes to Derek Hagan and Sammy Morris before Mare tied the game with a 25-yard field goal.

With 2:09 to play, the Jets’ biggest play of the season took place. Pennington flipped a short screen pass to Washington, who found a hole and scampered 64 yards down to the Miami 16-yard line. After three runs by Kevan Barlow, Nugent kicked a 30-yard field goal with 10 seconds to play, and the Jets had their biggest win of the year.

==== Scoring Summary ====
Third quarter

- NYJ – FG Nugent 22, 2:25.

Fourth quarter

- MIA – McMichael 7 pass from Lemon (Mare kick), 13:26.
- NYJ – Cotchery 32 pass from Pennington (Nugent kick), 8:04.
- MIA – FG Mare 25, 2:09.
- NYJ – FG Nugent 30, :10.

=== Week 17: vs. Oakland Raiders ===
Quarter	1	2	3	4	Total
Raiders	0	3	0	0	3
Jets	7	3	3	10	23

at The Meadowlands, East Rutherford, New Jersey

- Game time: 1:00 PM EST
- Game weather: 40 °F or 4.4 °C (Clear)
- Game attendance: 78,039
- Referee: Jeff Triplette
- TV announcers (CBS): Greg Gumbel and Dan Dierdorf

==== Game summary ====
After the teams traded punts, Aaron Brooks completed a pass to Johnnie Morant for a first down, but David Barrett forced a fumble and Hank Poteat recovered. Brad Smith had a key run on the next drive, and Chad Pennington then tossed a 1-yard touchdown pass to Chris Baker. Oakland later went on a drive to the Jets’ 10-yard line, but on third down, Kerry Rhodes sacked Brooks, forcing Oakland to settle for a Sebastian Janikowski field goal. Pennington led the Jets on a key score during a "two-minute drill," bringing the Jets into position for a Mike Nugent 35-yard field goal and a 10–3 halftime lead.

Pennington would find Laveranues Coles, Leon Washington, and Baker on long gains on the first drive of the second half before Nugent kicked a 22-yard field goal. The ensuing kickoff was returned 92 yards by Chris Carr to the Jets’ 1-yard line, but the play was negated by a holding penalty on Jarrett Cooper. The Jets stopped Brooks on a 4th-and-inches on the drive, and effectively iced the game and a playoff spot when Leon Washington scored on a 15-yard touchdown run around end. On the next Oakland drive, Eric Barton sacked Brooks, forcing a fumble, and Bobby Hamilton recovered. Nugent's 35-yard field goal capped the scoring. When the Denver Broncos lost at home to the San Francisco 49ers, the Jets secured the top wild-card berth and a place in the wild-card round of the playoffs.

==== Scoring Summary ====
First quarter

- NYJ – Baker 1 pass from Pennington (Nugent kick), 4:54.

Second quarter

- OAK – FG Janikowski 35, 10:36.
- NYJ – FG Nugent 35, :03.

Third quarter

- NYJ – FG Nugent 22, 7:45.

Fourth quarter

- NYJ – Washington 15 run (Nugent kick), 13:37.
- NYJ – FG Nugent 35, 11:43.

== Postseason ==
=== Schedule ===
Round	Date	Opponent (seed)	Result	Record	Venue	Recap
Wild Card	January 7, 2007	at New England Patriots (4)	L 16–37	0–1	Gillette Stadium	Recap

=== Game summaries ===
==== AFC Wild Card Playoffs: at (4) New England Patriots ====
Quarter	1	2	3	4	Total
Jets	3	7	3	3	16
Patriots	7	10	6	14	37

at Gillette Stadium

- Game time: 1:00 PM EST
- Game weather: 50 °F or 10 °C (Sunny)
- Game attendance: 68,756
- Referee: Bill Vinovich
- TV announcers (CBS): Jim Nantz and Phil Simms

==== Game summary ====
The Jets and Patriots had split their two games of the 2006 season, with the Jets winning the second matchup. Whereas the Jets won that game primarily by blitzing quarterback Tom Brady, this time Brady opened the game with a no-huddle offense, quickly scoring a touchdown on their opening drive. The Jets eventually went ahead, 10–7, on a 77-yard scamper on a short pass from Pennington to Jerricho Cotchery, but the Patriots responded with a field goal, and then a nearly seven-minute drive to close the first half with a touchdown, putting them ahead, 17–10.

In the second half, the Jets and Patriots each exchanged field goals, keeping the differential at seven. Arguably the biggest play of the game came when Jets quarterback Chad Pennington attempted a screen pass to Jerricho Cotchery. The pass was tipped and the ball fell to the ground, but because Pennington had made the pass slightly behind him, it was considered a lateral, and thus a fumbled ball. New England defensive tackle Vince Wilfork picked up the ball and ran it 35 yards to the Jets’ 15-yard line, ending any momentum the Jets had. The Patriots were able to convert on the turnover, and made it a ten-point game going into the fourth quarter.

In the fourth, the Jets again pulled to within seven points, but the Patriots again marched down the field, eating more than six minutes off the clock. The drive culminated in a seven-yard touchdown pass to running back Kevin Faulk. The final nail in the coffin for the Jets was an interception by Asante Samuel, which was returned for a touchdown with less than five minutes to play. After the game, Patriots coach Bill Belichick and Jets coach Eric Mangini, who were not on good terms during this season, embraced in the middle of the field.

==== Scoring summary ====
First quarter

- NE – Dillon 11 run (Gostkowski kick), 11:53. Patriots 7–0. Drive: 10 plays, 65 yards, 3:07.
- NYJ – FG Nugent 28, 2:36. Patriots 7–3. Drive: 4 plays, 5 yards, 1:30.

Second quarter

- NYJ – Cotchery 77 pass from Pennington (Nugent kick), 14:45. Jets 10–7. Drive: 3 plays, 80 yards, :17.
- NE – FG Gostkowski 20, 10:57. Tied 10–10. Drive: 10 plays, 56 yards, 3:48.
- NE – Graham 1 pass from Brady (Gostkowski kick), :11. Patriots 17–10. Drive: 15 plays, 80 yards, 6:54.

Third quarter

- NYJ – FG Nugent 21, 8:19. Patriots 17–13. Drive: 13 plays, 73 yards, 6:41.
- NE – FG Gostowski 40, 4:22. Patriots 20–13. Drive: 8 plays, 52 yards, 3:57.
- NE – FG Gostowski 28, :04. Patriots 23–13. Drive: 4 plays, 5 yards, 1:39.

Fourth quarter

- NYJ – FG Nugent 37, 11:39. Patriots 23–16. Drive: 8 plays, 61 yards, 3:25.
- NE – Faulk 7 pass from Brady (Gostkowski kick), 5:16. Patriots 30–16. Drive: 13 plays, 63 yards, 6:23.
- NE – Samuel 36 interception return (Gostkowski kick), 4:54. Patriots 37–16.
