= Justin Miller (attorney) =

American lawyer (born 1975)

- Born: Justin T. Miller; September 12, 1975 (age 50); Los Angeles, California, U.S.
- Education: B.A., J.D., LL.M. in Taxation
- Alma mater: University of California, Berkeley, New York University School of Law
- Occupation: Attorney
- Awards: Fellow of the American Bar Foundation, Fellow of the American College of Trust and Estate Counsel
- Website: evercore.com

Justin Miller (born September 12, 1975) is an American tax attorney. He is an adjunct professor at Golden Gate University.

== Education ==
Miller grew up in Los Angeles, California, and attended Palisades High School, where he was an all-city varsity tennis player. In 1995, he received a bachelor's degree, with honors, from the University of California, Berkeley, and in 1999, a juris doctor and master of laws in taxation from New York University School of Law.

== Professional life ==
Miller began his career as an attorney at the law firm of Sidley Austin in 1999. In 2012, Miller began teaching as an adjunct professor at Golden Gate University, and in 2021, he joined Evercore Wealth Management as a partner.

He is the author of numerous published and cited academic journal articles as well as a frequent keynote speaker at major conferences. He also is often quoted as a national tax expert in the media, including Barron’s, Bloomberg News, Business Insider, CNBC, Financial Planning, Forbes, Law360, MarketWatch, Tax Notes, The New York Times, ThinkAdvisor, and The Wall Street Journal. In addition, he has been selected on multiple occasions to comment on regulatory and legislative tax proposals in front of the United States Senate Committee on Finance, United States House Committee on Ways and Means, United States Congressional Joint Committee on Taxation, Internal Revenue Service, and United States Department of the Treasury.

He was the former editor-in-chief of the California Tax Lawyer.

Miller has served in leadership positions with the American Bar Association, American College of Trust and Estate Counsel, California Bar Foundation, California Society of Certified Public Accountants, Constitutional Rights Foundation, Los Angeles County Bar Association, San Francisco Estate Planning Council, San Francisco Tax Club, and State Bar of California.

== Awards and distinctions ==
In 2016, Miller was elected as a fellow of the American College of Trust and Estate Counsel and as a fellow of the American Bar Foundation.

In 2017, Miller received the V. Judson Klein Award from the State Bar of California and was granted the Outstanding Conference Speaker Award from the California Society of Certified Public Accountants.

In 2019, he received the Albert Nelson Marquis Lifetime Achievement Award.

== Select bibliography ==
- “A Critique of the Cryptic Rules for Taxing Crypto,” Tax Notes (Jul. 2022). Retrieved from https://www.taxnotes.com/tax-notes-federal/cryptocurrency/critique-cryptic-rules-taxing-crypto/2022/07/04/7dlyf
- “IRS Argues Split-Dollar Is Not ‘Faire,’ but Challenge Is Foiled,” Probate & Property (Jul. 2022). Retrieved from https://www.americanbar.org/groups/real_property_trust_estate/publications/probate-property-magazine/2022/july-august/irs-argues-splitdollar-not-faire-challenge-foiled/
- “Tax Reform Could Make Divorce a Whole Lot More Taxing,” Family Law Quarterly (Oct. 2019). Retrieved from https://www.americanbar.org/groups/family_law/publications/family-law-quarterly/volume-52/issue-2/tax-reform-could-make-divorce-whole-lot-more-taxing/
- "The Use-It-or-Lose-It Increased Gift and Estate Tax Exemption" Trusts & Estates (Dec. 2018). Retrieved from https://www.wealthmanagement.com/estate-planning/use-it-or-lose-it-increased-gift-and-estate-tax-exemption
- "Charitable Deductions for 'Charitable' LLCs: Have Your Cake and Eat It Too," Tax Notes (Nov. 2017). Retrieved from https://www.taxnotes.com/tax-notes-federal/charitable-giving/charitable-llcs-have-your-cake-and-eat-it-too/2017/11/27/1x7sn
- "Making Divorce Less Taxing: A Unique Opportunity for Income, Estate, and Gift Tax Planning," Real Property, Trust and Estate Law Journal (Jan. 2017). Retrieved from https://www.jstor.org/stable/44649755
