= 2006 All-Pro Team =

Official list of the best NFL players in 2006

The 2006 All-Pro Team comprised the National Football League players that were named to the Associated Press (AP), Pro Football Writers Association (PFWA), or The Sporting News All-Pro teams in 2006. Both first and second teams are listed for the AP team. The three teams are included in Total Football II: The Official Encyclopedia of the National Football League. In 2006, the PFWA and the publication Pro Football Weekly combined their All-Pro teams.

== Teams ==
Offense
Position	First team	Second team
Quarterback	Drew Brees, New Orleans Saints (AP, PFWA, SN)	Peyton Manning, Indianapolis Colts (AP-2)
Running back	LaDainian Tomlinson, San Diego Chargers (AP, PFWA, SN); Larry Johnson, Kansas City Chiefs (AP, PFWA, SN)	Frank Gore, San Francisco 49ers (AP-2); Steven Jackson, St. Louis Rams (AP-2)
Fullback	Lorenzo Neal, San Diego Chargers (AP)	Mike Karney, New Orleans Saints (AP-2t); Ovie Mughelli, Baltimore Ravens (AP-2t)
Wide receiver	Marvin Harrison, Indianapolis Colts (AP, PFWA, SN); Chad Johnson, Cincinnati Bengals (AP, PFWA, SN)	Torry Holt, St. Louis Rams (AP-2); Andre Johnson, Houston Texans (AP-2)
Tight end	Antonio Gates, San Diego Chargers (AP, PFWA, SN)	Tony Gonzalez, Kansas City Chiefs (AP-2)
Tackle	Jammal Brown, New Orleans Saints (AP, PFWA); Willie Anderson, Cincinnati Bengals (AP); Walter Jones, Seattle Seahawks (PFWA, SN); Jonathan Ogden, Baltimore Ravens (SN)	Jonathan Ogden, Baltimore Ravens (AP-2); Walter Jones, Seattle Seahawks (AP-2)
Guard	Steve Hutchinson, Minnesota Vikings (PFWA, SN); Shawn Andrews, Philadelphia Eagles (AP, SN); Alan Faneca, Pittsburgh Steelers (AP, PFWA)	Will Shields, Kansas City Chiefs (AP-2); Steve Hutchinson, Minnesota, (AP-2)
Center	Olin Kreutz, Chicago Bears (AP, PFWA, SN)	Jeff Saturday, Indianapolis Colts (AP-2)

Special teams
Position	First team	Second team
Kicker	Robbie Gould, Chicago Bears (AP, PFWA, SN)	Nate Kaeding, San Diego Chargers (AP-2t); Matt Stover, Baltimore Ravens (AP-2t)
Punter	Brian Moorman, Buffalo Bills (AP, PFWA, SN)	Mat McBriar, Dallas Cowboys (AP-2)
Kick Returner	Devin Hester, Chicago Bears (AP); Justin Miller, New York Jets (PFWA, SN)	Justin Miller, New York Jets (AP-2)
Punt Returner	Devin Hester, Chicago Bears (PFWA, SN)	
Special Teams	Brendon Ayanbadejo, Chicago Bears (PFWA)	

Defense
Position	First team	Second team
Defensive end	Jason Taylor, Miami Dolphins (AP, PFWA, SN); Julius Peppers, Carolina Panthers (AP, PFWA, SN)	Aaron Schobel, Buffalo Bills (AP-2); Aaron Kampman, Green Bay Packers (AP-2)
Defensive tackle	Jamal Williams, San Diego Chargers (AP, PFWA, SN); Kevin Williams, Minnesota Vikings (AP, PFWA, SN)	Richard Seymour, New England Patriots (AP-2); John Henderson, Jacksonville Jaguars (AP-2)
Inside linebacker	Brian Urlacher, Chicago Bears (AP, PFWA, SN); Zach Thomas, Miami Dolphins (AP)	Bart Scott, Baltimore Ravens (AP-2); Al Wilson, Denver Broncos (AP-2)
Outside linebacker	Adalius Thomas, Baltimore Ravens (AP, PFWA); Shawne Merriman, San Diego Chargers (AP, PFWA, SN); Lance Briggs, Chicago Bears (SN)	Lance Briggs, Chicago Bears (AP-2); DeMarcus Ware, Dallas Cowboys (AP-2)
Cornerback	Rashean Mathis, Jacksonville Jaguars (AP, PFWA, SN); Champ Bailey, Denver Broncos (AP, PFWA, SN)	Nnamdi Asomugha, Oakland Raiders (AP-2); Ronde Barber, Tampa Bay Buccaneers (AP-2)
Safety	Brian Dawkins, Philadelphia Eagles (AP); Ed Reed, Baltimore Ravens (AP, PFWA, SN); Adrian Wilson, Arizona Cardinals (PFWA, SN)	Kerry Rhodes, New York Jets (AP-2); Adrian Wilson, Arizona Cardinals (AP-2)

== Key ==
- AP = Associated Press first-team All-Pro
- AP-2 = Associated Press second-team All-Pro
- AP-2t = Tied for second-team All-Pro in the AP vote
- PFWA = Pro Football Writers Association All-NFL
- SN = Sporting News All-Pro
