= California CPA Education Foundation =

The CalCPA Education Foundation provides continuing education and information to CPAs and other professionals. Founded in 1966, the CalCPA Education Foundation is a 501(c)(3) organization and a sister organization of The California Society of Certified Public Accountants (CalCPA).

CPAs are required to pass a Uniform Certified Public Accountant Examination to receive certification. To maintain that license, CPAs must undergo 80 hours biennially of continued professional education (CPE). The CalCPA Education Foundation's revenue comes from providing CPAs CPE via conferences, courses, webcasts, on demand, onsite training and more.

== History ==
In 1965, Arthur Sargent, former CalCPA executive director, suggested the formation of a foundation under which the professional development program could flourish. In addition to ensuring that all the funds raised from educational programs would be reinvested into additional educational programs, a foundation could pursue research into accounting and tax matters, and study the accounting educational programs of California universities and colleges. An ad hoc committee, chaired by Tindall Cashion, was appointed to investigate the feasibility of establishing a separate foundation. In June 1965, the CalCPA board of directors approved formation of a separate nonprofit corporation that would be a subsidiary corporation under CalCPA’s control. In March 1966, the board approved the articles of incorporation and the bylaws of the new nonprofit corporation, and the California CPA Foundation for Education and Research was born. The name was changed to CalCPA Education Foundation in 1994.

== Services ==
The CalCPA Education Foundation offers training and continuing professional education programs.

== See also ==
- California Society of Certified Public Accountants
