= Chris Baker (tight end) =

American football player (born 1979)

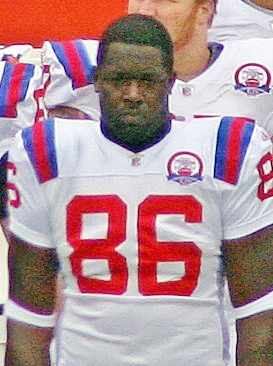
- Baker with the New England Patriots in 2009

No. 81, 86
- Position: Tight end

Personal information
- Born: November 18, 1979 (age 47); St. Albans, New York, U.S.
- Listed height: 6 ft 3 in (1.91 m)
- Listed weight: 258 lb (117 kg)

Career information
- High school: Saline (Saline, Michigan)
- College: Michigan State
- NFL draft: 2002: 3rd round, 88th overall pick

Career history
- New York Jets (2002–2008); New England Patriots (2009); Seattle Seahawks (2010)

Awards and highlights
- Second-team All-American (2001); 2× Second-team All-Big Ten (1999, 2001)

Career NFL statistics
- Receptions: 168
- Receiving yards: 1,763
- Receiving touchdowns: 15
- Stats at Pro Football Reference

Christopher T. Baker (born November 18, 1979) is an American former professional football player who was a tight end in the National Football League (NFL). He was selected by the New York Jets in the third round of the 2002 NFL draft. He played college football for the Michigan State Spartans.

== Early life ==
Christopher T. Baker was born on November 18, 1979, in St. Albans, New York. He attended Saline High School in Saline, Michigan.

== College career ==
Baker played college football at Michigan State from 1998 to 2001. He finished with 133 catches for 1,705 yards and 13 touchdowns including a career best season as a senior with 40 catches for 548 yards and four touchdowns.

== Professional career ==
Pre-draft measurables
Height	Weight	Arm length	Hand span	40-yard dash	10-yard split	20-yard split	20-yard shuttle	Three-cone drill	Vertical jump	Broad jump	Bench press
6 ft 4 in (1.93 m)	258 lb (117 kg)	31 1/2 in (0.80 m)	9 1/4 in (0.23 m)	4.87 s	1.71 s	2.82 s	4.22 s	6.95 s	35 in (0.89 m)	9 ft 4 in (2.84 m)	18 reps
All values were taken from the NFL Scouting Combine and published in scouting report.

=== New York Jets ===
Baker was drafted by the New York Jets in the third round (88th overall) of the 2002 NFL Draft. During the 2005 season, he served as the starting tight end until becoming injured and placed on the injured reserve list. Baker had a breakout season in 2006, setting career bests in receiving yards, receptions, touchdowns and starts, as the Jets finished 10-6 earning the fifth wild card spot. After a career year in 2007, Chris said the Jets promised him a new contract and lied.

Baker felt disrespected with the Jets decision to use their first-round pick in the 2008 NFL draft on Dustin Keller and their acquisition of free agent Bubba Franks, which pushed Baker to third on the depth chart and made him the least-paid Jets tight end, despite his productive past two seasons. The Jets finally extended Baker with a three-year, $12.2 million contract extension through 2012, but it came with an out-clause stating the Jets would owe him nothing if he was cut from the team before March 5, 2009.

On February 20, 2009, Baker was released by the Jets.

=== New England Patriots ===
On February 27, 2009, Baker signed a five-year contract with the New England Patriots. On September 27, 2009, Baker caught Tom Brady's 200th career touchdown pass in the fourth quarter of the Patriots and Falcons game. Baker played in all 16 games for the 2009 season.

On March 4, 2010, Baker was released by the Patriots.

=== Seattle Seahawks ===
On March 13, 2010, Baker signed a contract with the Seattle Seahawks, primarily to serve as a blocking tight end. On January 4, 2011, Baker was placed on a season-ending injured reserve due to a fractured bone in his hip, four days before Seattle's playoff game against the New Orleans Saints. Baker played in all 16 games for the 2010 season and caught nine passes for 116 yards and a touchdown.

On February 24, 2011, Baker was released by the Seahawks.

== Career statistics ==
=== NFL ===
Legend
**Bold**	Career high

==== Regular season ====
Year	Team	Games		Receiving					
Year	Team	GP	GS	Tgt	Rec	Yds	Avg	Lng	TD
2002	NYJ	12	1	3	2	14	7.0	10	0
2003	NYJ	**16**	0	18	14	137	9.8	24	0
2004	NYJ	**16**	0	29	18	182	10.1	23	**4**
2005	NYJ	8	8	25	18	269	**14.9**	**47**	1
2006	NYJ	**16**	14	45	31	300	9.7	28	**4**
2007	NYJ	15	**15**	**61**	**41**	**409**	10.0	22	3
2008	NYJ	**16**	13	30	21	194	9.2	29	0
2009	NWE	**16**	7	19	14	142	10.1	36	2
2010	SEA	**16**	13	19	9	116	12.9	44	1
		131	71	249	168	1,763	10.5	47	15

==== Playoffs ====
Year	Team	Games		Receiving					
Year	Team	GP	GS	Tgt	Rec	Yds	Avg	Lng	TD
2002	NYJ	**2**	0	3	3	26	8.7	16	**1**
2004	NYJ	**2**	0	4	4	15	3.8	6	0
2006	NYJ	1	**1**	**6**	**5**	**68**	**13.6**	**26**	0
2009	NWE	1	**1**	2	1	2	2.0	2	0
		6	2	15	13	111	8.5	26	1

=== College ===
Season	GP	Receiving			
Season	GP	Rec	Yds	Avg	TD
1998	11	22	305	13.9	3
1999	12	38	391	10.3	4
2000	11	33	461	14.0	2
2001	12	40	548	13.7	4
Totals	46	133	1,705	12.8	13

== Personal life ==
In May 2009 Chris married his girlfriend, Yadira Taveras, in Long Island, New York. Together, they have a son, Chris Jr, and daughter Tamia. They reside near Boca Raton, Florida.
