= Drew Coleman =

American football player (born 1983)

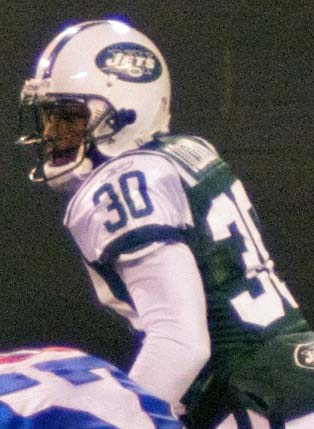
- Coleman with the New York Jets in 2009

No. 30
- Position: Cornerback

Personal information
- Born: April 22, 1983 (age 43); Henderson, Texas, U.S.
- Listed height: 5 ft 9 in (1.75 m)
- Listed weight: 180 lb (82 kg)

Career information
- High school: Henderson
- College: Trinity Valley CC (2001–2002); TCU (2003–2005)
- NFL draft: 2006: 6th round, 189th overall pick

Career history

Playing
- New York Jets (2006–2010); Jacksonville Jaguars (2011); Detroit Lions (2012)*
- * Offseason or practice squad member only

Coaching
- Blinn College (2016–2017) Pass game coordinator & defensive backs coach; Rice (2018) Defensive quality control assistant; Rice (2019–present) Defensive assistant

Awards and highlights
- Second-team All-MW (2005)

Career NFL statistics
- Total tackles: 173
- Sacks: 8
- Forced fumbles: 8
- Pass deflections: 27
- Interceptions: 4
- Stats at Pro Football Reference

Drew Antrion Coleman (born April 22, 1983) is an American former professional football player who was a cornerback in the National Football League (NFL). After playing college football for the TCU Horned Frogs, he was selected by the New York Jets of the National Football League (NFL) in the sixth round of the 2006 NFL draft. He played for the Jets for five seasons from 2006 to 2010 and the Jacksonville Jaguars in 2011.

== Early life ==
Drew Coleman graduated from high school in 2001 in Henderson, Texas. He was a do-it-all player and became one of the best dual-threat QB's in East Texas, playing quarterback, wide receiver, running back, punt returner, kick returner, and defensive back as he led his team to a District championship his senior year. He received multiple awards while at Henderson including District MVP, All-East Texas, Rusk County, Texas player of the year, and All-State honors. Coleman was also a basketball player in which he was named the District and All East-Texas Defensive MVP his junior and senior year. Along with Rickey Dudley (TE- Oakland Raiders), Coleman is one of the most influential athletes to represent Henderson High School in its history.

== College career ==
A graduate of Henderson High School, Coleman attended Trinity Valley Community College in Athens, Texas, playing wide receiver and quarterback for two years for the Cardinals where he was the 2002 Southwest Junior College Football Conference Player of the year and also Offensive Player of the Year. He then transferred to Texas Christian University in Fort Worth. At TCU, he was switched to cornerback by coach Gary Patterson. He was injured for most of the 2004 season, but as a senior in 2005 started all 12 games for the Horned Frogs' 11–1 Mountain West Conference Championship team. He was second on the team with 4 interceptions and tied for first with 8 passes broken up. After the season, he was named Second-team All-MWC. He majored in speech communication.

== Professional career ==
Pre-draft measurables
Height	Weight
5 ft 8 3/4 in (1.75 m)	173 lb (78 kg)
Values from Pro Day

=== New York Jets ===
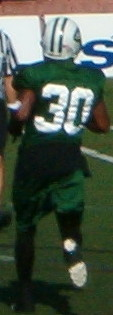
Coleman at the Jets 2009 training camp

Coleman was selected in the sixth round (189th overall) of the 2006 NFL draft.

As a rookie with the Jets in 2006, Coleman played in all 17 games as the Jets advanced to the playoffs for the first time in three years. He often played nickelback and developed into a solid special teams tackler. He had a key forced fumble against the New England Patriots in the first game of the season, and wound up starting four games at cornerback his rookie year. He was named the Jets Special teams player of the week for week 3 win at Buffalo.

In 2007, he was a regular on special teams and later in the season was included in some defensive packages for the Jets, including getting his first interception against the Miami Dolphins on December 2, 2007, and forcing a fumble during a sack in the last game of the Jets' 2007 season on Kansas City Chiefs QB Brodie Croyle.

Coleman racked up 22 tackles in 2009. He finished the 2010 season with 41 tackles, four sacks, five forced fumbles and one interception.

Coleman made his first impact of the season by filling in for an injured Darrelle Revis against the New England Patriots in week 2. Coleman impressed greatly as he was part of a Jets defense that did not allow a touchdown in the second half of the game, which is where he made his biggest impact. In the next game against the Miami Dolphins, Coleman continued to make impact plays as he intercepted Chad Henne at the end of the game, preventing a comeback for the Dolphins. Against the Vikings the next week he would sack Brett Favre, and finish the game against the Vikings with 3 tackles and 1 sack. In week 6 he recorded 5 tackles in a win against the Denver Broncos. His most impressive game of the season came against the Pittsburgh Steelers in week 15. Coleman recorded 10 tackles, 2 sacks and 2 forced fumbles. On the Jets last regular season game, Coleman recorded 2 tackles and 1 sack.

=== Jacksonville Jaguars ===
Coleman signed a three-year contract with the Jacksonville Jaguars on July 29, 2011. Coleman played in all 16 games during the 2011 season however, he was released on May 3, 2012.

=== Detroit Lions ===
Coleman signed a one-year contract with the Detroit Lions on July 25, 2012. He was placed on injured reserve on August 16, 2012, and released from injured reserve on August 23.

== NFL career statistics ==
Legend
**Bold**	Career high

=== Regular season ===
Year	Team	Games		Tackles					Interceptions					Fumbles			
Year	Team	GP	GS	Cmb	Solo	Ast	Sck	TFL	Int	Yds	TD	Lng	PD	FF	FR	Yds	TD
2006	NYJ	**16**	**4**	33	23	10	1.0	2	0	0	0	0	2	0	0	0	0
2007	NYJ	11	0	7	6	1	0.0	1	1	1	0	1	2	0	0	0	0
2008	NYJ	9	0	24	19	5	1.0	1	0	0	0	0	6	0	0	0	0
2009	NYJ	15	1	22	15	7	0.0	0	0	0	0	0	4	0	0	0	0
2010	NYJ	**16**	**4**	41	**37**	4	**4.0**	**4**	1	0	0	0	4	**5**	0	0	0
2011	JAX	**16**	**4**	**46**	32	**14**	2.0	3	**2**	**5**	0	**8**	**9**	3	0	0	0
		83	13	173	132	41	8.0	11	4	6	0	8	27	8	0	0	0

=== Playoffs ===
Year	Team	Games		Tackles					Interceptions					Fumbles			
Year	Team	GP	GS	Cmb	Solo	Ast	Sck	TFL	Int	Yds	TD	Lng	PD	FF	FR	Yds	TD
2006	NYJ	1	0	3	1	**2**	0.0	0	0	0	0	0	0	0	0	0	0
2009	NYJ	**3**	0	5	4	1	0.0	0	0	0	0	0	0	0	0	0	0
2010	NYJ	**3**	**2**	**9**	**8**	1	**1.0**	**1**	0	0	0	0	0	0	0	0	0
		7	2	17	13	4	1.0	1	0	0	0	0	0	0	0	0	0

== Coaching career ==
Coleman was a defensive assistant for Rice Owls football team, and currently serves as defensive coordinator for West Brook High School in Beaumont, Texas.
