= Kevan Barlow =

American football player (born 1979)

No. 32
- Position: Running back

Personal information
- Born: January 7, 1980 (age 46); Pittsburgh, Pennsylvania, U.S.
- Listed height: 6 ft 1 in (1.85 m)
- Listed weight: 234 lb (106 kg)

Career information
- High school: Peabody (Pittsburgh)
- College: Pittsburgh (1997–2000)
- NFL draft: 2001: 3rd round, 80th overall pick

Career history
- San Francisco 49ers (2001–2005); New York Jets (2006); Pittsburgh Steelers (2007)*
- * Offseason or practice squad member only

Awards and highlights
- First-team All-Big East (1999)

Career NFL statistics
- Rushing attempts: 1,022
- Rushing yards: 3,984
- Rushing touchdowns: 30
- Receptions: 144
- Receiving yards: 1,164
- Receiving touchdowns: 3
- Stats at Pro Football Reference

Kevan Courtney Barlow (born January 7, 1980) is an American former professional football player who was a running back in the National Football League (NFL). He played college football for the Pittsburgh Panthers and was selected by the San Francisco 49ers in the third round of the 2001 NFL draft. He played in the NFL for the 49ers, New York Jets, and Pittsburgh Steelers.

== Early life ==
Barlow played his high school football at Peabody High School in Pittsburgh, Pennsylvania. As his team's star player, he led them to the City League Championship three consecutive times.

During his high school career, Barlow was a two-time All-City selection, a Pittsburgh Post Gazette City League Player of the Year, and also a member of the Post Gazette Fabulous 22. Barlow was selected to play in the prestigious Big 33 Football Classic all-star game. He was compared to NFL hall of famer Curtis Martin during his high school career. After his senior season, he committed to playing for the University of Pittsburgh.

Barlow was inducted into the Pittsburgh City League High School Hall of Fame in 2017.

== College career ==
Barlow attended the University of Pittsburgh where he played before entering the NFL draft. During his college career, he rushed 486 times for 2,324 yards (4.78 yards per rush) and 20 touchdowns.

In Barlow's junior year, he was named to the All Big East team. He scored the final touchdown at Pitt Stadium at 7:06 PM, just minutes before a record crowd of 60,190 people rushed the field and tore down the goal posts.

Barlow played in the final college game at Three Rivers Stadium, gaining 274 rushing yards and scoring four touchdowns against the West Virginia on November 24, 2000. During this game, Barlow gained the most rushing yards against the Mountaineers breaking Syracuse's Larry Csonka’s record of 216 yards in a game against West Virginia in 1965. When he left school, he was ranked 11th on the school's career scoring list with 144 points and a total of three 200 yard games.

In 2010, Barlow was ranked top 10 in the Big East in multiple categories including rushing attempts (4th with 197), rushing yards (3rd with 1,053), rushing yards per attempt (7th with 5.3), rushing touchdowns (7th with 8), plays from scrimmage (3rd with 210), yards from scrimmage (4th with 1,187), touchdowns from scrimmage (8th with 9), and overall touchdowns (9th with 9).

Barlow was named in the list of the greatest running backs in the University of Pittsburgh's history. He was also listed by ESPN sports analyst Mel Kiper Jr. as one of the top running backs available for the National Football League Draft. He finished 7th on Pittsburgh's list for career rushing yards with 2,234.

| Season | Team | GP | Rushing | | | | Receiving | | | |
| Season | Team | GP | Att | Yds | Avg | TD | Rec | Yds | Avg | TD |
|---|---|---|---|---|---|---|---|---|---|---|
| 1997 | Pittsburgh Panthers | 7 | 27 | 108 | 4.0 | 2 | 6 | 140 | 23.3 | 1 |
| 1998 | Pittsburgh Panthers | 9 | 121 | 533 | 4.4 | 4 | 11 | 140 | 12.7 | 1 |
| 1999 | Pittsburgh Panthers | 10 | 141 | 630 | 4.5 | 6 | 6 | 94 | 15.7 | 1 |
| 2000 | Pittsburgh Panthers | 11 | 197 | 1,053 | 5.3 | 8 | 13 | 134 | 10.3 | 1 |
| College | | 37 | 486 | 2,324 | 4.8 | 20 | 36 | 508 | 14.1 | 4 |

== Professional career ==
Pre-draft measurables
| Height | Weight | Arm length | Hand span | 40-yard dash | 10-yard split | 20-yard split | Vertical jump |
|---|---|---|---|---|---|---|---|
| 6 ft 1 1/8 in (1.86 m) | 235 lb (107 kg) | 32 in (0.81 m) | 9 in (0.23 m) | 4.56 s | 1.61 s | 2.63 s | 32.0 in (0.81 m) |
All values from NFL Combine

Barlow was drafted in the 3rd round (80th overall) of the 2001 NFL draft by the San Francisco 49ers and signed a $3.8 million contract over three years. Denver Head Coach Mike Shanahan congratulated the 49ers for picking "the best back in the draft." He played a total of seven seasons in the NFL including five with San Francisco.

=== San Francisco 49ers ===
Barlow started his first professional game in the NFL on December 7, 2003, against the Arizona Cardinals, after the 49er's starting running back Garrison Hearst was injured during the third quarter of a game against the Baltimore Ravens the week prior. The 49ers won the game 50–14 with Barlow rushing for 154 yards and a touchdown. Although he only started nine games, he finished the 2003 season leading the 49ers in rushing with 1,024 yards. He also rushed for 6 touchdowns and averaged 5.1 yards per carry. Barlow and Hearst combined to run for 1,792 yards during this year.

In 2002, after the 49ers training camp, Barlow played in an exhibition game against the Washington Redskins in Osaka, Japan as part of the American Bowl series.

After a breakout 2003 season in which Barlow had a 5.1 yard per carry average and 1,024 yards, he became a restricted free agent. The 49ers gave him the starting job by releasing Garrison Hearst and signing him to a long-term deal for five years $28 million. The terms included $20 million, of an $8 million signing bonus fully guaranteed. Barlow suffered a knee injury that spanned for multiple games, crippling his play.

The 2005 season seemed to mark a rebound in his running game. His play was severely affected when he received another knee injury, cutting his season short. He had 420 yards on 102 carries for a 4.0 average through 7 games before being sidelined due to injury.

Barlow appeared in 72 games for the 49ers. He rushed for 3,614 yards and 24 touchdowns on 891 carries. He also added 1,143 yards on 137 catches.

=== New York Jets ===
Looking to replace Curtis Martin, after he suffered a serious knee injury, the New York Jets acquired Barlow from the 49ers on August 20, 2006, in exchange for their fourth round draft pick in the 2007 NFL draft. He was given an honorable mention by Bleacher Report as one of the best trades in the New York Jets' history. As part of the deal, the Jets assumed the remainder of his contract which had three seasons remaining at base salaries of $2.5 million (2006), $3.25 million (2007) and $4 million (2008).

Barlow appeared in twelve games for the Jets but only started three. He rushed for 370 yards and scored 6 touchdowns. Due to another knee injury, he was placed on injury reserve and was subsequently released on February 21, 2007.

=== Pittsburgh Steelers ===
After the Pittsburgh Steelers were unable to draft a running back during the 2007 NFL draft, Barlow met with the team on May 4, 2007, eventually signing a one-year contract with them on May 10, 2007. He was expected to share running-back duties with starter Willie Parker. Barlow was released on August 27, 2007, due to a career-ending knee injury.

== Philanthropy ==
While a member of the 49ers, Barlow would make routine visits to San Quentin State Prison to visit inmates and give them encouragement for post-prison life. Barlow also spent time reading to kids at different schools in the San Francisco area and also visited kids at UCSF Benioff Children's Hospital.

Barlow has been a long-time advocate for children's cancer charities. He has rallied with former San Francisco mayor, Lieutenant Governor, and Governor Gavin Newsom at charity events to combat breast cancer. In 2012, Barlow released a statement in support of new cancer treatments including a finding that folic acid playing a significant role in reducing the rates of two childhood cancers.

Barlow is also an outspoken supporter of the YMCA. He is involved in the YMCA's day summer camp program and other programs for kids offered by the YMCA.

== NFL career statistics ==
| Year | Team | Games | | Rushing | | | | | Receiving | | | | |
| Year | Team | GP | GS | Att | Yds | Avg | Lng | TD | Rec | Yds | Avg | Lng | TD |
|---|---|---|---|---|---|---|---|---|---|---|---|---|---|
| 2001 | SF | 15 | 0 | 125 | 512 | 4.1 | 25 | 4 | 22 | 247 | 11.2 | 61T | 1 |
| 2002 | SF | 14 | 0 | 145 | 675 | 4.7 | 35 | 4 | 14 | 136 | 9.7 | 29 | 1 |
| 2003 | SF | 16 | 4 | 201 | 1,024 | 5.1 | 78T | 6 | 35 | 307 | 8.8 | 48 | 1 |
| 2004 | SF | 15 | 14 | 244 | 822 | 3.4 | 60 | 7 | 35 | 212 | 6.1 | 15 | 0 |
| 2005 | SF | 12 | 12 | 176 | 581 | 3.3 | 29 | 3 | 31 | 241 | 7.8 | 24 | 0 |
| 2006 | NYJ | 12 | 3 | 131 | 370 | 2.8 | 12 | 6 | 7 | 21 | 3.0 | 8 | 0 |
| Career | | 84 | 33 | 1,022 | 3,984 | 3.9 | 78T | 30 | 144 | 1,164 | 8.1 | 61T | 3 |
