= Kerry Rhodes =

American football player and actor (born 1982)

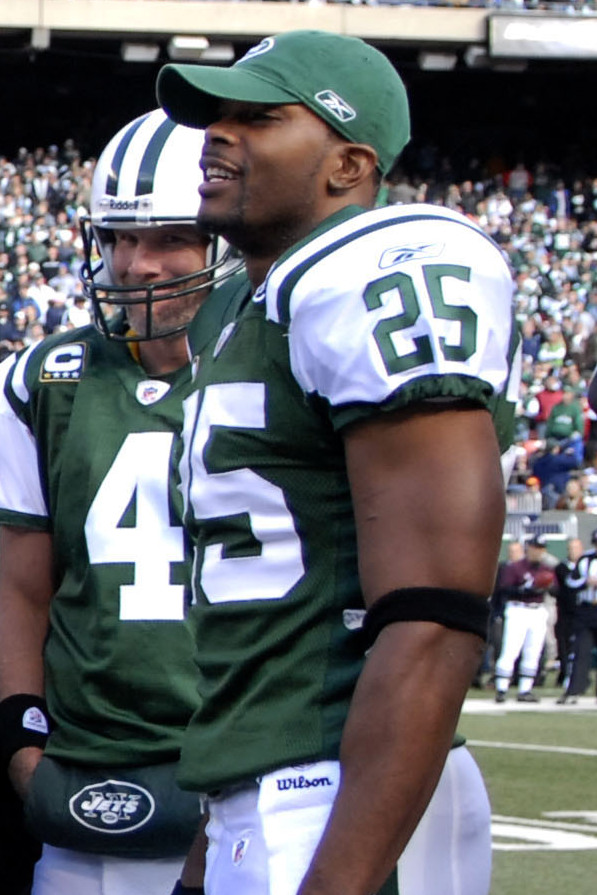
- Rhodes with the New York Jets in 2008

No. 25
- Position: Safety

Personal information
- Born: August 2, 1982 (age 44); Birmingham, Alabama, U.S.
- Listed height: 6 ft 3 in (1.91 m)
- Listed weight: 212 lb (96 kg)

Career information
- High school: Bessemer (AL) Lanier
- College: Louisville
- NFL draft: 2005: 4th round, 123rd overall pick

Career history
- New York Jets (2005–2009); Arizona Cardinals (2010–2012)

Awards and highlights
- Second-team All-Pro (2006); PFWA All-Rookie Team (2005)

Career NFL statistics
- Total tackles: 611
- Sacks: 13.0
- Forced fumbles: 8
- Fumble recoveries: 11
- Interceptions: 23
- Defensive touchdowns: 3
- Stats at Pro Football Reference

Kerry Rhodes (born August 2, 1982) is an American actor and former professional football player who was a safety in the National Football League (NFL). He was selected by the New York Jets in the fourth round of the 2005 NFL draft, and most recently played for the Arizona Cardinals in 2012. Rhodes was named to All-Pro teams by three publications after the 2006 NFL season. He played college football for the Louisville Cardinals.

== Early life ==
Rhodes was born in Birmingham, Alabama, to Jubrella and Jerome Rhodes. He began playing football at nine years old. He was a starting quarterback and honor student at Jess Lanier High School in Bessemer, Alabama. As a junior, he threw more than 1,500 yards and 15 touchdowns while rushing for 500 yards and three scores in 1998; guiding Lanier to a 10–2 record. During his senior season, Rhodes threw for more than 1,600 yards and ran for another 850. He was also selected Metro Player of the year and first-team All-state in basketball of which he led his team to the 6A title game.

== College career ==
In 2000, Rhodes joined Louisville as a quarterback, but was moved to safety Rhodes finished his first season at Louisville with 9 tackles, three pass breakups and an interception. As a reserve in 2002, he had 18 tackles (12 solos), a forced fumble, two pass deflections, a blocked kick and an interception. Rhodes took over as a free safety in 2003 and registered career highs with a sack, 82 tackles (61 solos) and three stops for losses. In 2004, he closed out his college career with 167 tackles (101 solos), a 12-yard sack, 18 pass deflections and 11 interceptions for 106 yards in returns. Rhodes was accorded first-team All-Conference USA honors that same year.

== Professional career ==
Pre-draft measurables
Height	Weight	Arm length	Hand span	40-yard dash	10-yard split	20-yard split	20-yard shuttle	Three-cone drill	Vertical jump	Broad jump	Bench press
6 ft 2 1/2 in (1.89 m)	209 lb (95 kg)	32 1/4 in (0.82 m)	9 5/8 in (0.24 m)	4.60 s	1.67 s	2.72 s	4.12 s	6.94 s	42.0 in (1.07 m)	10 ft 3 in (3.12 m)	12 reps
All values from NFL Combine

=== New York Jets ===
Rhodes was selected in the fourth round (123rd overall) of the 2005 NFL draft by the New York Jets. That same year, he beat out Oliver Celestin for the starting job at strong safety and started in 16 consecutive games in 2005. In his first professional season, Rhodes recorded 108 total tackles (85 solo), a sack, an interception, 9 pass deflections and a forced fumble.

On September 24, 2006, he made a pivotal play against J. P. Losman of the Buffalo Bills, stripping the ball from the quarterback's hands and allowing Shaun Ellis to return the fumble for a touchdown. This helped the Jets to a 28–20 victory. He was named AFC Defensive Player of the Week for week 3. In Week 7, Rhodes intercepted a pass by Detroit Lions quarterback Jon Kitna. In Week 12, during the game against the Houston Texans, Rhodes intercepted a pass by quarterback David Carr in the second half. Following the 2006 season, Rhodes was named to All-Pro team by the Associated Press.

On April 9, 2008, Rhodes signed an extension with the Jets for five years, for a total of $33.5 million, with $20 million guaranteed.

=== Arizona Cardinals ===
On March 6, 2010, Rhodes was traded from the New York Jets to the Arizona Cardinals for a 2010 4th-round draft pick and a 2011 7th-round pick. Later, his Jets coach Rex Ryan criticized Rhodes in his memoir, saying, "He wouldn't work, and he was a Hollywood type, flashy and needing attention".

Rhodes started and played in all 16 regular season games of the 2010-2011 season for the Cardinals, recording a total of 90 tackles, 78 solo, 12 assists, 1 sack, 12 passes deflected, 4 interceptions returned for a total of 174 yards, longest returned for 66 yards and 4 fumble recoveries. On December 31, 2010, Rhodes was awarded The Lloyd Herberg MVP award for the 2010–2011 season by the Arizona chapter of the Pro Football Writers Association.

In 2011, Rhodes was inducted into the Kentucky chapter of National Football League Players Association Hall of Fame along with Lou Michaels, Dale Lindsey, Rod Hill and Phil Simms.

He finished his 2012 season with 58 tackles, nine assists, four interceptions and two forced fumbles, and was named the fourth best safety in the league by Pro Football Focus.

Rhodes was released by the Cardinals on March 13, 2013. Rhodes was due to receive $5.5 million for the 2013 season and rejected an offer to restructure the contract at one year and $3 million.

In a February 2014 interview with ESPN, Rhodes denied that he was blacklisted by NFL teams. He said his absence from the league was "a product of me wanting to do other things and not finding the right opportunity," referring to his interests in acting and producing, and the amount of money offered.

== NFL career statistics ==
Legend
	Led the league
**Bold**	Career high

=== Regular season ===
Year	Team	Games		Tackles					Interceptions					Fumbles			
Year	Team	GP	GS	Cmb	Solo	Ast	Sck	TFL	Int	Yds	TD	Lng	PD	FF	FR	Yds	TD
2005	NYJ	16	16	**106**	**86**	20	1.0	1	1	0	0	0	7	1	0	0	0
2006	NYJ	16	16	99	75	**24**	**5.0**	4	4	46	0	25	**13**	**3**	1	4	0
2007	NYJ	16	16	68	52	16	2.0	7	**5**	76	0	36	10	2	1	11	1
2008	NYJ	16	16	84	60	**24**	1.0	**9**	2	50	0	50	5	0	2	29	0
2009	NYJ	16	14	63	55	8	0.0	2	3	17	0	11	**13**	0	1	44	0
2010	ARI	16	16	90	78	12	1.0	3	4	**174**	0	**66**	12	0	**4**	**69**	**2**
2011	ARI	7	7	34	26	8	2.0	3	0	0	0	0	4	0	2	1	0
2012	ARI	15	15	67	58	9	1.0	0	4	39	0	30	11	2	0	0	0
Career		118	116	611	490	121	13.0	29	23	402	0	66	75	8	11	158	3

=== Postseason ===
Year	Team	Games		Tackles					Interceptions					Fumbles			
Year	Team	GP	GS	Cmb	Solo	Ast	Sck	TFL	Int	Yds	TD	Lng	PD	FF	FR	Yds	TD
2006	NYJ	1	1	6	5	1	0.0	**1**	0	0	0	0	1	0	0	0	0
2009	NYJ	3	3	**13**	**9**	**4**	**1.0**	0	0	0	0	0	**2**	**1**	**1**	0	0
Career		4	4	19	14	5	1.0	1	0	0	0	0	3	1	1	0	0

== Personal life ==
In 2016, it was announced that Rhodes was engaged to Australian actress Nicky Whelan. Rhodes and Whelan were married in Los Angeles on April 15, 2017. In October 2017, several news sources reported the couple were divorcing.
