= Leon Washington =

American football player and coach (born 1982)

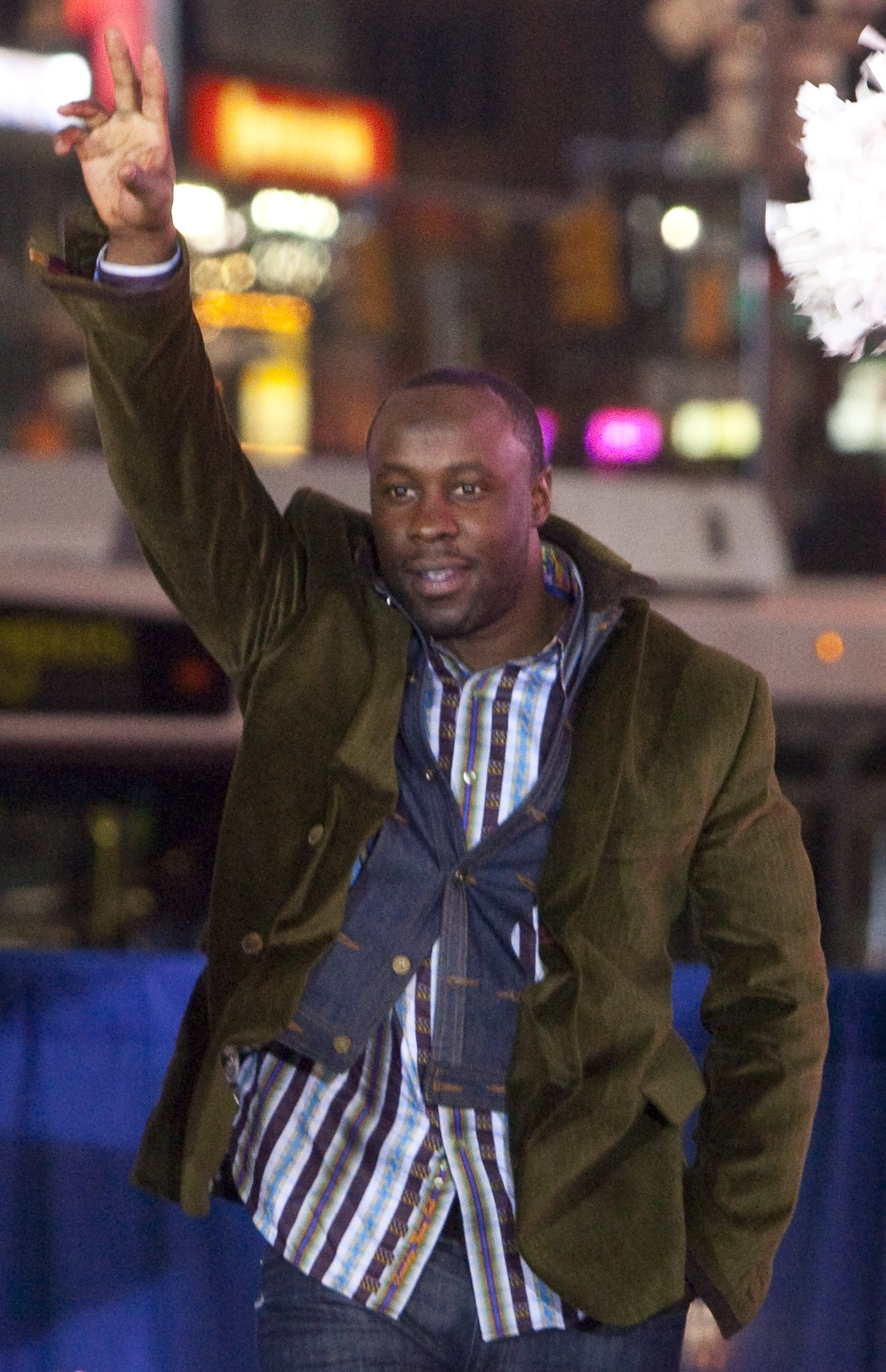
- Washington at a pep rally in Times Square in 2010

Central State Marauders
- Title: Offensive coordinator & quarterbacks coach

Personal information
- Born: August 29, 1982 (age 44); Jacksonville, Florida, U.S.
- Listed height: 5 ft 8 in (1.73 m)
- Listed weight: 192 lb (87 kg)

Career information
- High school: Andrew Jackson (Jacksonville)
- College: Florida State (2002–2005)
- NFL draft: 2006: 4th round, 117th overall pick

Career history

Playing
- New York Jets (2006–2009); Seattle Seahawks (2010–2012); New England Patriots (2013); Tennessee Titans (2013–2014)

Coaching
- Jacksonville Jaguars (2016) Bill Walsh NFL diversity coaching fellowship; Atlanta Falcons (2017) Bill Walsh NFL diversity coaching fellowship; Detroit Lions (2019–2020) WCF minority coaching assistantship; New York Jets (2021–2023) Assistant special teams coach; Central State (2025–present) Offensive coordinator & quarterbacks coach

Awards and highlights
- First-team All-Pro (2008) (Note: Selected as a kick returner); Second-team All-Pro (2010) (Note: Selected as a kick returner); 2× Pro Bowl (2008, 2012); NFL Alumni Special Teams Player of the Year (2008); Second-team All-ACC (2004)

Career NFL statistics
- Rushing yards: 2,271
- Rushing touchdowns: 16
- Receiving yards: 1,286
- Receiving touchdowns: 4
- Return yards: 9,346
- Return touchdowns: 8
- Stats at Pro Football Reference

Leon Dewitt Washington Sr. (born August 29, 1982) is an American football coach and former professional player who played in the National Football League (NFL) as a running back and return specialist and made two Pro Bowls and two All-Pro teams during his career. Washington holds many kick return records for both the Jets and Seattle Seahawks. He is the offensive coordinator and quarterbacks coach for Central State University, positions he has held since 2025.

Washington played college football for the Florida State Seminoles. He was selected by the New York Jets in the fourth round of the 2006 NFL draft. He also played for the Seattle Seahawks, New England Patriots, and Tennessee Titans.

== Early life ==
Washington attended Andrew Jackson High School where he proved himself an exceptional all-around athlete, dominating in football as running back, cornerback, and wide receiver. In his senior year, he rushed for 2,437 yards and 28 touchdowns, was a threat on kick and punt returns, returning three punts and one kickoff for touch-downs, and defensively had 88 tackles (52 unassisted) and three interceptions. After this superlative season, in 2002, he was named "Mr. Florida" in football, and earned the Florida Times-Union Player of the Year honor. The Orlando Sentinel named him the No. 3 prospect overall in the state of Florida, and Alliance Sports named him the No. 7 prospect overall in the nation. He was named to the PrepStar Dream Team, rated by Rivals100.com as the No. 1 cornerback in the country and the No. 9 player overall, and rated by TheInsiders.com as the No. 7 cornerback in the country. He was named the Florida Kids' No. 28 prospect from the state of Florida, named to Bill Buchalter's Florida Super 26, was recognized on the Athlon Sports Top 100 High School Seniors, SuperPrep's Top 100 nationally, and Max Emfinger's Top 200.

He selected Florida State over the universities of Florida, South Carolina, Oklahoma, and Maryland.

== College career ==
Washington received an athletic scholarship to attend Florida State University, where he played for the Florida State Seminoles football team from 2002 to 2005. As a freshman in 2002, he changed positions from cornerback to running back. That year, he played in all 14 games and ranked fourth on the team with 273 yards rushing while catching six passes for 30 yards. He led the team with 273 total return yards and also in punt return average (11.5 yards per return) and kickoff return average (28.3 yards per return). He became the first true freshman at FSU to record a 100-yard rushing game since Travis Minor in 1997. He was named ACC Specialist of the Week twice for his performances against Clemson and Duke, he led the Seminoles in rushing in the Sugar Bowl vs. Georgia with 48 yards on 10 carries, he returned a kickoff 97 yards for a score against Clemson, he recovered a blocked punt in the endzone for a touchdown against Duke, and finished the year with 11 tackles on special teams with two forced fumbles and one fumble recovery.

In his sophomore year (2003), Washington played in nine of Florida State's 13 games including the Orange Bowl. He was the second leading rusher with 387 yards and a 5.2 yards per carry average despite missing four games after dislocating his right elbow in the first quarter of the season opener against North Carolina. Washington's punt return for a touchdown against Wake Forest was the first by a Seminole since Peter Warrick's 59-yard return against Virginia Tech in the 2000 Sugar Bowl. He rushed for a season-high 121 yards on 17 carries against NC State, the highest total by a Florida State running back during the season. He scored the game-winning touchdown in the second overtime against the North Carolina Wolfpack on a 12-yard run to clinch the Seminole's 11th ACC Championship in 12 years as a league member. Washington rushed for 69 yards on 13 carries in Florida State's victory over Virginia and 65 yards on 15 carries in the Seminoles' victory over Florida.

During his junior year in 2004, Washington earned the Gator Bowl Most Valuable Player honors with 12 rushes for a career-high 195 yards in the Seminoles' victory over West Virginia. His 16.3 yards per rush is a single-game Florida State record while his 195 yards is the second most by a Seminole player in a bowl game. He earned All-ACC second-team honors and was named as the Seminoles' offensive Most Valuable Player by the coaching staff at the team banquet. He played in 10 of 12 games while earning 10 starting assignments, leading the ACC in rushing yards per game with an average of 95.1. In addition, he finished second in the ACC with 112.5 total offensive yards per game, while leading the team with 951 total yards of offense and seven rushing touchdowns. He ranked second nationally in average yards per carry at 6.89. His season totals included 14 receptions for 98 yards and four kickoff returns for a total of 81 total yards. He scored a total of 42 points to rank second on the team behind only kicker Xavier Beitia.

In his senior year season in 2005, Washington played in 11 games and started in 10, missing two games because of an ankle injury he suffered in the Maryland game. Washington became the only player in the Bobby Bowden era to score touchdowns in five different ways—by run, reception, punt return, kick off return and fumble recovery. He ranked second on the team in rushing yards (430) with a 4.4 yards per carry average, and averaged 10.7 yards per catch. He was the 10th player in FSU history in career rushing with 2,041 yards. He had a season-high 179 all-purpose yards when he rushed for 87 yards and had 92 yards receiving in the Wake Forest game, including a career-long 61-yard touchdown reception. Washington returned six punts for 51 yards in the 2005 season and returned four kickoffs for 63 yards. He led the team in rushing in the Orange Bowl (against Penn State) with 30 yards on six carries, and added six catches for 24 yards in that game. Washington played in 43 games over his FSU career, and was named the Seminoles' most dependable running back in spring practice in 2005 by the coaching staff.

== Professional career ==
Pre-draft measurables
Height	Weight	Arm length	Hand span	40-yard dash	10-yard split	20-yard split	20-yard shuttle	Three-cone drill	Vertical jump	Broad jump	Bench press
5 ft 7 7/8 in (1.72 m)	201 lb (91 kg)	29 in (0.74 m)	9 in (0.23 m)	4.45 s	1.58 s	2.63 s	4.37 s	6.94 s	32.5 in (0.83 m)	8 ft 9 in (2.67 m)	17 reps
All values from NFL Combine

=== New York Jets ===
Washington was selected in the fourth round (117th overall) of the 2006 NFL draft. The pick used was obtained by the Jets from the Kansas City Chiefs, as compensation for the release of former Jets head coach Herman Edwards.

Washington gained some attention in his second preseason game, returning a kickoff 87 yards for a touchdown against the Washington Redskins. Nonetheless, he did not immediately get many carries in the first few weeks of the regular season. However, as the Jets running game struggled in the first few weeks, his role in the offense increased. He first showcased his ability on a 47-yard reception Week 3 in Buffalo. Two weeks later in Jacksonville, he recorded his first 100-yard rushing game, running for 101 yards in a Jets 41–0 loss.

On October 22 at home against Detroit, Leon ran for 129 yards for two touchdowns and led the Jets' to a 31–24 win. In a game in Miami on Christmas night, Washington had 108 receiving yards including a 64-yard reception to set up the game-winning field goal in a 13–10 win. He helped the Jets clinch the fifth playoff spot in the AFC on New Year's Eve 2006 with a touchdown run that helped to seal a win against the Oakland Raiders in the final game of the 2006 regular season. He finished the regular season with 650 yards rushing and four touchdowns on 151 attempts. He averaged 4.3 yards-per-carry. In an AFC East game, he returned a kick 92 yards for a touchdown against the New England Patriots in 2008. Washington gained 2,317 all-purpose yards in 2008, more than any other running back in the NFL.

In a Week 9 game against the Buffalo Bills on November 2, 2008, Washington made a play as a kick returner when he noticed a kickoff was headed out of bounds at the 8-yard line. When he saw the ball would stay in bounds, Washington straddled the sideline and then put his hand on the ball. The officials initially spotted the ball at the 8-yard line before Washington reminded them that, according to the rulebook, the ball is out of bounds when a player standing out of bounds touches it, meaning the correct call was Illegal procedure. This gave the Jets the ball at the 40-yard line, a 32-yard gain in field position.

Washington was selected as AFC Special teams Player of the Week for Week 11 of the 2008 season, the first such award in his career. His 92-yard touchdown was the fourth kick return touchdown of his career, surpassing Justin Miller for the club record. He led the league in all-purpose yards in 2008 with 1606 yards.

Washington was out for the 2009 season with a compound fracture to his fibula that he suffered in Week 7 in a 38–0 shutout win versus the Oakland Raiders. Prior to his season-ending injury, Washington had rushed for 331 yards on 72 carries, with a 4.6 yards/carry average. Washington had yet to score in 2009 prior to his injury. The Jets call their wildcat formation "Seminole" because Washington lined up at quarterback, and was a Florida State Seminole.

On April 15, 2010 (the NFL free agent deadline), Washington signed his tendered contract with the Jets for one year, worth $1.759 million.

=== Seattle Seahawks ===
On April 24, 2010, Washington was traded to the Seattle Seahawks for a fifth-round draft pick in the 2010 NFL draft. He was assigned the number 33 on his new team; 29 went to first-round draft pick Earl Thomas. During the September 26, 2010, game against the San Diego Chargers, Washington set a Seahawks record with 2 kickoff return touchdowns. He returned the opening kickoff of the 2nd half for a team record 101 yards, then in the 4th quarter he ran 99 yards for his second kickoff touchdown of the game. On March 1, 2011, Washington signed a four-year deal worth $12.5 million to stay with the Seattle Seahawks. Due to the signing of wide receiver Percy Harvin, Leon Washington was released by the Seahawks on March 12, 2013.

=== New England Patriots ===
On March 14, 2013, Washington signed with the New England Patriots. On September 1, 2013, Patriots released Leon Washington during final roster cuts. On September 7, the Patriots re-signed Washington. On November 23, 2013, he was released.

=== Tennessee Titans ===
On November 26, 2013, Washington signed with the Tennessee Titans.

Washington re-signed with the Titans to another one-year deal on March 12, 2014.

== Coaching career ==
On March 11, 2019, the Lions hired Washington as WCF minority coaching assistantship/offense and special teams coach.

On February 10, 2021, the New York Jets hired Washington as special teams assistant coach. His contract was not renewed following the 2023 season.

== Records ==
=== NFL records ===
- Most kickoff return touchdowns in a single game: 2 (2010 vs San Diego Chargers) (tied with 9 others)

=== NY Jets franchise records ===
- Most career kickoff return touchdowns (4)
- Most kickoff return touchdowns in a single season: 3 (2007)
- Most all-purpose yards in a single season: 2,337 (2008)

=== Seahawks franchise records ===
- Most career kickoff return touchdowns (4)
- Second longest kickoff return touchdown: 101 (2010 vs San Diego Chargers)
- Most kickoff return touchdowns in a single game: 2 (2010)

== Personal ==
Washington's son is the half-brother of former Alabama CB Terrion Arnold. He is now an NFL prospect in the upcoming 2024 NFL draft. Washington's 2006 Bowman "Signs of the Future" card with the Jets caused a great deal of controversy during the third week of November 2006, in which it appears that he is making an obscene gesture. The card sold on eBay during that time for more than four times its book value. Washington insists his gesture is a popular hand gesture among his friends in his hometown.

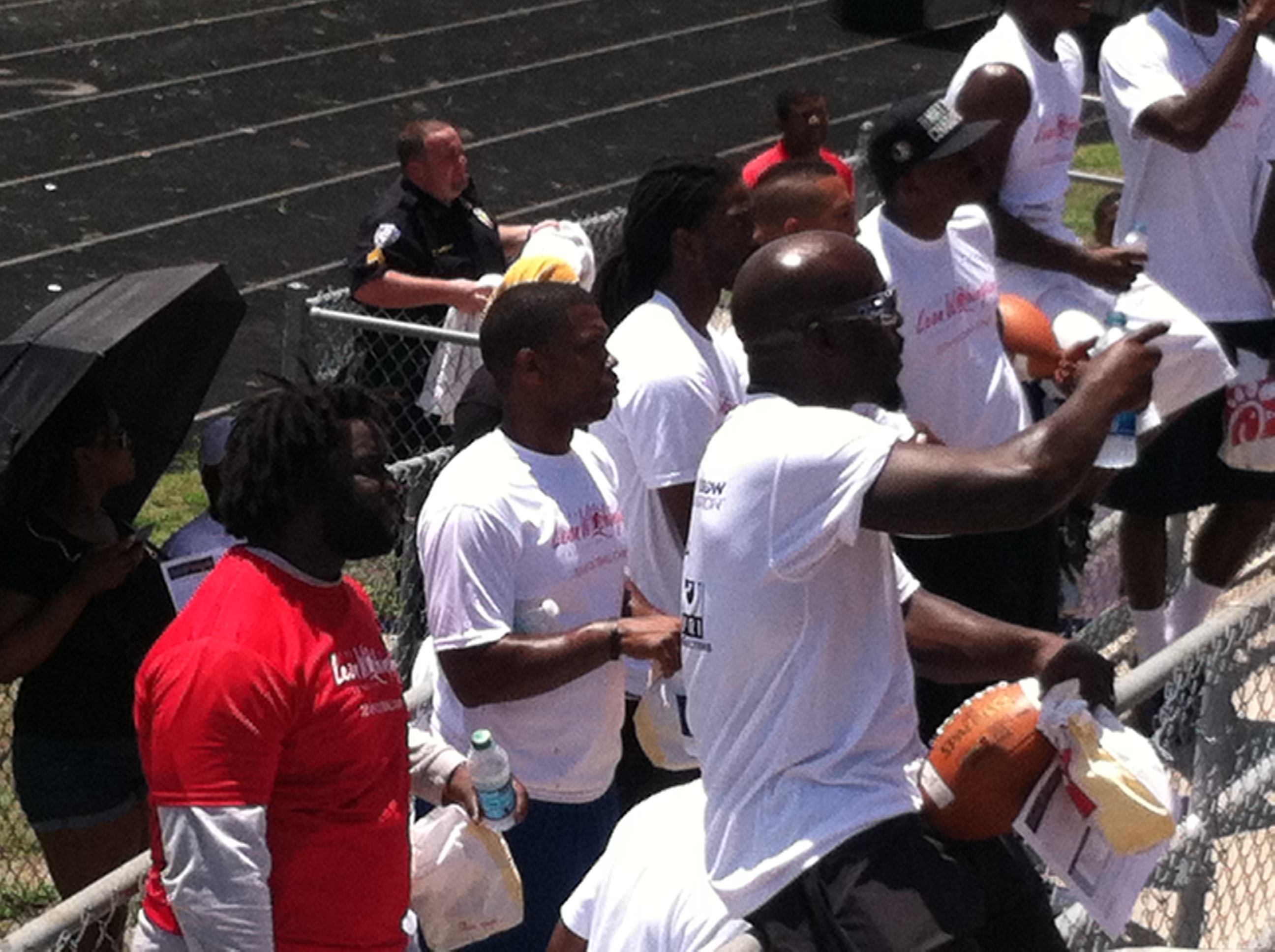
Washington (at right, holding football) and other NFL players address parents during a question and answer session during the 2014 Leon Washington Football Camp, sponsored by the Leon Washington Foundation.

Washington established a charitable organization called the Leon Washington Foundation whose mission it is to assist low-income families in the Jacksonville, Florida area with education, sports, and life skills. The foundation provides programs intended to enlighten, inspire, and educate underprivileged youths to live stronger, healthier, and more productive lives. A major annual event is the Leon Washington Football Camp, which provides a one-day, non-contact football clinic run by current and former NFL players and local volunteers free of charge to youth from Jacksonville and the surrounding region.
