= California Society of Certified Public Accountants =

US professional association

- Abbreviation: CalCPA
- Formation: 1909
- Type: Professional association
- Headquarters: Sacramento, California, United States
- Members: Certified Public Accountants
- Official language: English
- CEO: Denise LeDuc Froemming, CPA, CAE, MBA
- Website: www.calcpa.org

The California Society of Certified Public Accountants (CalCPA) is the largest statewide professional association of certified public accountants in the United States with more than 42,000 members.

Although 1909 is considered the year CalCPA was officially founded, public accountant organizations began forming before that time in California. In January 1903, CalCPA was first organized, followed by the formation of the Associated Certified Public Accountants of California, incorporated March 1906, and the Southern California Association of Certified Public Accountants, formed in October 1908. It was the merging of the three groups in 1909 that created the CalCPA that exists today.

== See also ==
- California CPA Education Foundation
