= Jamie Thompson (American football) =

American football player (born 1983)

No. 38, 27
- Position: Defensive back

Personal information
- Born: May 25, 1983 (age 43); Sparr, Florida, U.S.
- Listed height: 6 ft 0 in (1.83 m)
- Listed weight: 192 lb (87 kg)

Career information
- High school: North Marion (Citra, Florida)
- College: Butler CC (2001–2002); Oklahoma State (2003–2005)
- NFL draft: 2006: undrafted

Career history
- New York Jets (2006–2007); → Amsterdam Admirals (2007)

Awards and highlights
- Second-team All-Big 12 (2004); Second-team NJCAA All-America (2002); First-team All-KJCCC (2002)

Career NFL statistics
- Games played: 3
- Tackles: 1
- Stats at Pro Football Reference

Jamie Thompson (born May 25, 1983) is an American former professional football defensive back who played in the National Football League (NFL) for the New York Jets. He played college football for the Butler Grizzlies and Oklahoma State Cowboys. Thompson also had a stint in NFL Europa with the Amsterdam Admirals.

== Early life ==
Thompson was born on May 25, 1983, in Sparr, Florida. He attended North Marion High School in Citra, Florida, where he played football and basketball. As a senior, Thompson was named first-team All-State for Class 3A. He committed to play college football at Butler Community College.

== College career ==
Thompson played college football for the Butler Grizzlies from 2001 to 2002 and Oklahoma State Cowboys from 2003 to 2005. At Butler, he redshirted his first year and had 59 tackles, including 10.5 for loss, six pass breakups, two interceptions, one forced fumble and fumble recovery. Thompson was a first-team All-KJCCC and second team NJCAA All-American in 2002. Following the 2002 season, he transferred to Oklahoma State University.

In 2003, Thompson played in ten games, recording 13 tackles, including two for loss and one sack. The following season, he led the team in tackles with 85 and also had three sacks, two interceptions and three forced fumbles. Against Texas Tech, Thompson returned an interception for touchdown. He earned second-team All-Big 12 honors for his efforts. In 2005, Thompson recorded 83 tackles, including 8.5 for loss, five sacks, three pass deflections and one forced fumble.

== Professional career ==
=== New York Jets ===
After going undrafted in the 2006 NFL draft, Thompson signed with the New York Jets as an undrafted free agent. On September 2, he was waived and signed to the practice squad the following day. On December 9, Thompson was elevated to the active roster. He played in three games, recording one tackles against the Minnesota Vikings. On January 3, 2007, Thompson was placed on the injured reserve with a broken foot. On March 12, he re-signed with the Jets. On September 1, he was released by the team.

=== Amsterdam Admirals ===
On February 12, 2007, Thompson was allocated to the Amsterdam Admirals of NFL Europa. In ten games, he had 69 tackles and one forced fumble.
