= American College of Trust and Estate Counsel =

- Abbreviation: ACTEC
- Formation: 1949
- Type: Legal society
- Headquarters: 901 15th Street, NW, Suite 525; Washington, District of Columbia 20005
- Location: United States
- Members: 2,400 (2022)
- President: Robert W. Goldman
- Key people: Deborah O. McKinnon, Executive Director
- Website: actec.org

The American College of Trust and Estate Counsel (ACTEC) was established in 1949. It is a professional organization of lawyers, fiduciary counsel and law professors. Members of ACTEC are also known as 'Fellows'. Fellows specialize in the fields of trust and estate law, tax law, estate planning and other related legal specialties by speaking, writing, teaching and participating in local, state and national bar association activities. ACTEC is a legal organization based in the United States.

ACTEC has more than 2,400 members or 'Fellows' who practice or teach in the United States, Canada and other countries. ACTEC's national headquarters is located in Washington, D.C. This organization relates to Law in the United States.

== History ==
ACTEC was established in 1949 as the Probate Attorney Association. After several name changes, The American College of Trust and Estate Counsel was selected in 1990 as the new name for the not-for-profit corporation under the laws of the State of California. In 2009–10, the college moved the national office from Los Angeles to Washington, DC and became a Delaware corporation. ACTEC's headquarters in downtown DC is blocks from the US Department of Treasury and lawmakers.

== Mission ==
The mission of the college is to maintain an association, international in scope, of lawyers skilled and experienced in the practice of trust and estate law and the related practice areas mentioned above, and to: serve as an educational source in those areas; study, improve and reform probate, trust, and tax laws, procedures, and professional responsibility; bring together qualified lawyers whose character and ability contribute to the achievement of the purposes of the college; and cooperate with bar associations and other organizations with similar purposes.

== Membership ==
There are six classes of membership of the college: Fellow, International Fellow, Academic Fellow, Judicial Fellow, Honorary Fellow and Retired Fellow. Fellows are elected to membership by their peers.

== Amicus Briefs with Supreme Court ==
An amicus brief in The North Carolina Department of Revenue v. The Kimberley Rice Kaestner 1992 Family Trust was filed on March 1, 2019, with the Supreme Court by ACTEC.

== Affiliations ==
The American College of Trust and Estate Counsel Foundation was formed in 1982 as the philanthropic arm of The American College of Trust and Estate Counsel.

== Publications ==
The ACTEC Law Journal is a high-level academic journal on topics related to tax, trust and estate law.
