= Justin Miller (American football) =

American football player (born 1984)

No. 22, 21, 32, 43
- Positions: Defensive back, return specialist

Personal information
- Born: February 14, 1984 (age 42); Owensboro, Kentucky, U.S.
- Listed height: 5 ft 10 in (1.78 m)
- Listed weight: 186 lb (84 kg)

Career information
- High school: Owensboro
- College: Clemson
- NFL draft: 2005: 2nd round, 57th overall pick

Career history
- New York Jets (2005–2008); Oakland Raiders (2008–2009); New York Jets (2009); Arizona Cardinals (2010)*; Detroit Lions (2012)
- * Offseason or practice squad member only

Awards and highlights
- Second-team All-Pro (2006) (Note: Selected as a kick returner); Pro Bowl (2006); Freshman All-American (2002); 2× Second-team All-ACC (2002, 2004)

Career NFL statistics
- Total tackles: 99
- Forced fumbles: 1
- Fumble recoveries: 1
- Total return yards: 3,966
- Total touchdowns: 5
- Stats at Pro Football Reference

Justin Matthew Miller (born February 14, 1984) is an American former professional football player who was a cornerback and return specialist for six seasons in the National Football League (NFL). After playing college football for Clemson Tigers, he was selected by the New York Jets in the second round of the 2005 NFL draft. He played for the Jets from 2005 to 2008, the Oakland Raiders from 2008 to 2009, the Jets again in 2009, and the Detroit Lions in 2012. He was selected to the Pro Bowl with the Jets in 2006.

== Early life ==
Miller attended Owensboro High School in Owensboro, Kentucky. While there, he was a two-time All-State, All-Area, All-Conference, and All-Region pick, and as a senior, he won USA Today All-American Honorable Mention honors. Rated as the #1 or #2 player in the state of Kentucky by numerous publications. Was rated as the #9 Athlete in the Country by Super-Prep as a senior and also the #11 CB in the nation by ESPN. He also starred in track, and was the state long jump champion as a junior, along with running a personal best of 10.48 seconds on the 100 meter dash. Miller also played in two state championship games with Owensboro High School. Miller was a standout Tail Back and even seen time at the QB position while in high school.

== College career ==
While attending Clemson University, Miller played for the Clemson Tigers football team (2001-2004). He was a three-year starter before declaring early for the NFL draft. While at Clemson, Miller managed to finish with 13 interceptions and tied a single season record by recording eight interceptions as a true freshman. Miller also set a single season record against Florida State by returning two kickoffs for touchdowns and racking up 282 return yards, an NCAA record.

== Professional career ==
=== New York Jets (first stint) ===
Miller was drafted in the second round of the 2005 NFL draft (25th pick) by the New York Jets. As a rookie, Justin Miller made his impact as kick returner. He compiled 1,577 yards with a 26.3 yard average along with a touchdown. In 2006, Miller averaged 30.1 yards with 2 touchdowns. On October 1, 2006, in a game versus the Indianapolis Colts, Miller scored the longest touchdown in Jets history at the time (it has since been surpassed by a 106-yard return by Brad Smith), on a 103-yard kick return kicked off by Martin Gramatica. For his efforts, Miller earned a Pro Bowl selection as the AFC's kick returner. During the 2007 Pro Bowl festivities, Miller won the Fastest Man Competition.

On September 18, 2007, the Jets placed Miller on injured reserve due to a season-ending knee injury he suffered in the Jets 20–13 loss to the Baltimore Ravens. The Jets waived Miller on November 11, 2008, after cornerback Ty Law was signed.

=== Oakland Raiders ===
Miller was claimed off waivers by the Oakland Raiders on November 12, 2008. In a Thursday Night Football game against the San Diego Chargers, Miller had a 92-yard kick return for a touchdown at the end of the first half. The following week, Miller ran another kick back for a touchdown for 91 yards against the New England Patriots. Miller was named NFL Special Teams Player of the Month for the month of December. After visiting the Tennessee Titans in the off-season, Justin Miller signed a two-year contract with the Oakland Raiders. He was released on September 5, 2009, along with several other players. On September 30, 2009, Miller was re-signed by the Raiders. However, he was released on October 7.

=== New York Jets (second stint) ===
On October 27, 2009, the New York Jets re-signed Miller. He was expected to replace Leon Washington, who had a season-ending injury during week 7 against the Oakland Raiders, as the team's kick returner. However, he was waived on November 28, 2009.

=== Arizona Cardinals ===
Miller signed with the Arizona Cardinals on May 3, 2010. Miller competed with LaRod Stephens-Howling for the starting kick return spot, but lost out and was released during final cuts on September 3, 2010.

=== Detroit Lions ===
After being out of football for two years, Miller signed with the Detroit Lions. On August 31, 2012, he was released. On October 22, 2012, he was re-signed by the Detroit Lions. On October 30, 2012, he was released after the team acquired wide receiver Mike Thomas from the Jacksonville Jaguars.

=== NFL statistics ===
| Year | Team | GP | COMB | TOTAL | AST | SACK | FF | FR | FR YDS | INT | IR YDS | AVG IR | LNG | TD | PD |
|---|---|---|---|---|---|---|---|---|---|---|---|---|---|---|---|
| 2005 | NYJ | 16 | 42 | 34 | 8 | 0.0 | 0 | 0 | 0 | 0 | 0 | 0 | 0 | 0 | 2 |
| 2006 | NYJ | 16 | 53 | 46 | 7 | 0.0 | 1 | 1 | 0 | 0 | 0 | 0 | 0 | 0 | 6 |
| 2007 | NYJ | 2 | 2 | 1 | 1 | 0.0 | 0 | 0 | 0 | 0 | 0 | 0 | 0 | 0 | 0 |
| 2008 | NYJ | 1 | 1 | 0 | 1 | 0.0 | 0 | 0 | 0 | 0 | 0 | 0 | 0 | 0 | 0 |
| 2008 | OAK | 7 | 1 | 1 | 0 | 0.0 | 0 | 0 | 0 | 0 | 0 | 0 | 0 | 0 | 0 |
| Career | | 42 | 99 | 82 | 17 | 0.0 | 1 | 1 | 0 | 0 | 0 | 0 | 0 | 0 | 8 |
