= 2009 New York Jets season =

2009 season of NFL team New York Jets; 50th season in franchise history

- Owner: Woody & Christopher Johnson
- General manager: Mike Tannenbaum
- Head coach: Rex Ryan
- Offensive coordinator: Brian Schottenheimer
- Defensive coordinator: Mike Pettine
- Home stadium: Giants Stadium

Results
- Record: 9–7
- Division place: 2nd AFC East
- Playoffs: Won Wild Card Playoffs (at Bengals) 24–14; Won Divisional Playoffs (at Chargers) 17–14; Lost AFC Championship (at Colts) 17–30
- All-Pros: 3: C Nick Mangold (1st team); CB Darrelle Revis (1st team); ILB David Harris (2nd team)
- Pro Bowlers: 5: G Alan Faneca; T D'Brickashaw Ferguson; C Nick Mangold; DE Shaun Ellis; CB Darrelle Revis

Uniform
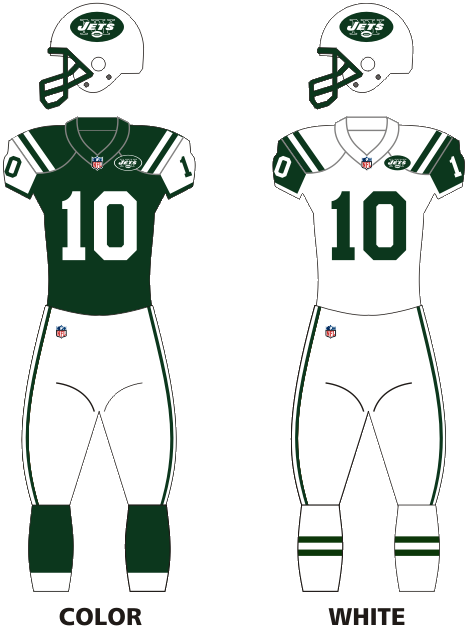

The 2009 New York Jets season was the franchise's 40th season in the National Football League (NFL), the 50th season overall, the last season at Giants Stadium and the first under new head coach Rex Ryan. While they matched their 9–7 record from 2008, this time the team headed to the playoffs. In the postseason the Jets defeated the Cincinnati Bengals 24–14 and 17–14 over the San Diego Chargers. But in the AFC Championship Game they lost to the Indianapolis Colts 30–17.

The Jets fired head coach Eric Mangini on December 29, 2008 and hired Rex Ryan from the Baltimore Ravens on January 18, 2009. The Jets were represented at the 2010 Pro Bowl by Darrelle Revis, Nick Mangold, Shaun Ellis, D’Brickashaw Ferguson, and Alan Faneca.

One highlight from this season included the Jets snapping their former divisional rival Indianapolis Colts' NFL record 23-game regular season winning streak that dated back to October 27, 2008, in which they were beaten by their divisional rival Tennessee Titans, and the Jets also made their first AFC Championship Game appearance since 1998. Quarterback Mark Sanchez became one of two quarterbacks (the other being Joe Flacco of the Baltimore Ravens) since the 1970 AFL-NFL Merger to win multiple playoff games in their rookie season. The Jets had the number one defense in all of football that year giving up only 236 points and allowed only 8 passing touchdowns.

== Offseason ==
=== Coaching changes ===
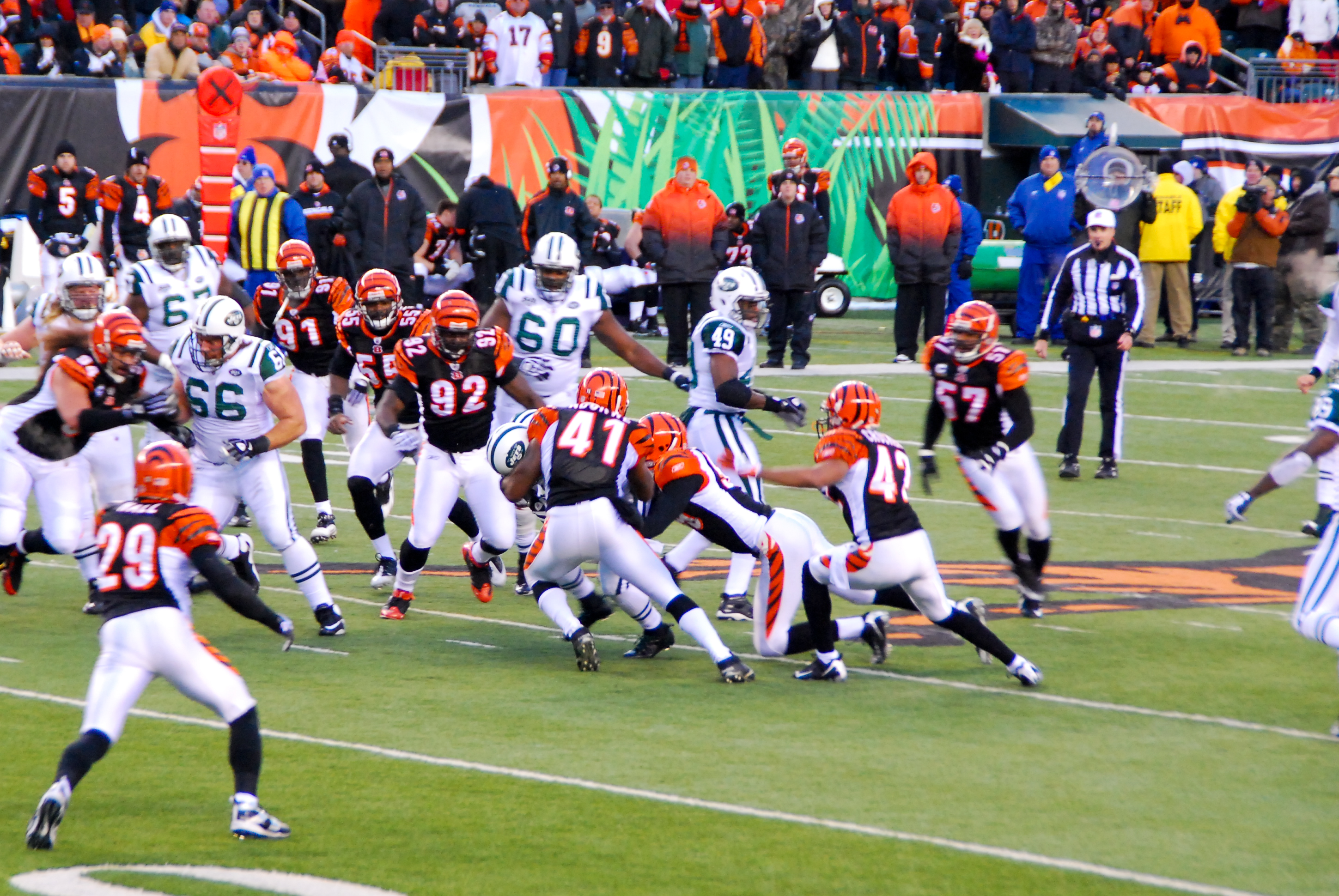
The Jets on offense against the Bengals in the playoffs, January 2010

Head coach Eric Mangini was fired by the Jets on December 29, 2008. The decision was made after the Jets fell from 8–3 and sole possession of first place in the AFC East with four losses in their last five games, causing them to miss a playoff berth. He finished his tenure as head coach with a 23–25 record including the playoffs.

At first, the Jets attempted to lure former Pittsburgh Steelers head coach Bill Cowher out of retirement, with the possibility of Cowher gaining personnel decisions in addition to coaching. Cowher ultimately decided to stay retired in 2009. The Jets interviewed several candidates for their vacancy. In-house candidates included offensive coordinator Brian Schottenheimer and offensive line coach Bill Callahan. Other candidates interviewed were Indianapolis Colts defensive coordinator Ron Meeks, New York Giants defensive coordinator Steve Spagnuolo, and Boston College head coach Jeff Jagodzinski (who was subsequently fired from his position as a result of accepting the interview).

The Jets eventually picked Baltimore Ravens defensive coordinator Rex Ryan as their head coach. He accepted the position just hours after the Ravens' loss in the AFC Championship Game on January 18, and was introduced by the Jets on January 21.

=== Signings ===
On February 27, the Jets signed former Baltimore Ravens linebacker Bart Scott to a six-year, $48 million deal. On March 3, the Jets inked Jim Leonhard, former Ravens safety, to a three-year, $6 million deal.

=== Departures ===
After failing to come to terms on a contract extension, the Jets restructured the contract of wide receiver Laveranues Coles to allow him to immediately become an unrestricted free agent on February 25. Though Coles admitted a chance he could re-sign with the Jets, he signed a four-year deal with the Cincinnati Bengals. On March 4, former kicker Mike Nugent was signed by the Tampa Bay Buccaneers to a one-year deal.

=== Trades ===
On February 28, the Jets traded for cornerback Lito Sheppard of the Philadelphia Eagles, sending the Eagles a 2009 fifth-round draft pick and a 2010 conditional draft pick. The pick can be as high as second and as low as fourth. Upon the trade, Sheppard received a four-year, $27.2 million contract extension.

On October 7, the Jets made a blockbuster deal with the Cleveland Browns to send wide receiver Braylon Edwards to the Jets for wide receiver Chansi Stuckey, linebacker Jason Trusnik, and two draft picks.

=== 2009 NFL draft ===
2009 New York Jets draft
Round	Pick	Player	Position	College	Notes
1	5	Mark Sanchez	QB	USC	from Cleveland
3	65	Shonn Greene	RB	Iowa	from Detroit
6	193	Matt Slauson	G	Nebraska	
Made roster * Made at least one Pro Bowl during career

The Jets were assigned the 17th selection in the first round of the 2009 NFL draft. Prior to the 2008 season, the Jets traded a conditional fourth round selection to the Green Bay Packers in exchange for quarterback Brett Favre; this became a third round selection because Favre took the majority of snaps for the Jets in 2008. They gave their fifth round pick to the Philadelphia Eagles in the Lito Sheppard trade. They also received a third round selection from the New Orleans Saints in exchange for linebacker Jonathan Vilma. Prior to the 2007 season, the Jets received a fourth round selection from the Washington Redskins in exchange for guard Pete Kendall; the pick was originally a 2008 fifth round selection that was upgraded due to Kendall's playing time in 2007.

On draft day, the Jets traded their first and second-round picks, defensive end Kenyon Coleman, safety Abram Elam, and quarterback Brett Ratliff to the Cleveland Browns for their first round selection, the fifth overall. The Jets used the selection to draft quarterback Mark Sanchez from the University of Southern California. The Jets also sent their third, fourth, and seventh-round selections to the Detroit Lions for the Lions' third-round pick, which was the first of the second day of the draft. The Jets selected running back Shonn Greene of the University of Iowa with this pick.

== Staff ==
2009 New York Jets staff
Front office: Owner – Woody Johnson; Head coaches: Head coach – Rex Ryan; Assistant head coach/offensive line – Bill Callahan; Offensive coaches: Offensive coordinator – Brian Schottenheimer; Quarterbacks – Matt Cavanaugh; Assistant quarterbacks – John DeFilippo; Running backs – Anthony Lynn; Wide receivers – Henry Ellard; Assistant offensive line/tight ends – Mike Devlin	Defensive coaches: Defensive coordinator – Mike Pettine; Defensive line coach – Kerry Locklin; Linebackers – Bob Sutton; Secondary – Dennis Thurman; Assistant defensive backs – Doug Plank; Defensive assistant – Jeff Weeks; Defensive quality control – Brian Smith; Defensive quality control – Jim O'Neil; Special teams coaches: Special teams coordinator – Mike Westhoff; Special teams coordinator – Kevin O'Dea; Assistant special teams – Ben Kotwica; Strength and conditioning: Strength and conditioning – Sal Alosi; Assistant strength and conditioning – Kyle Thorne

== Rosters ==
=== Opening training camp roster ===
New York Jets 2009 opening training camp roster
Quarterbacks: 10 Erik Ainge; 11 Kellen Clemens; 19 Chris Pizzotti; 6 Mark Sanchez; Running backs: 39 Jehuu Caulcrick; 32 Brock Christopher FB; 23 Shonn Greene; 20 Thomas Jones; 49 Tony Richardson FB; 29 Leon Washington; 22 Danny Woodhead; Wide receivers: 87 David Clowney; 89 Jerricho Cotchery; 17 Britt Davis; 14 Marcus Henry; 2 Paul Raymond; 16 Brad Smith; 83 Chansi Stuckey; 7 Mario Urrutia; 18 Huey Whittaker; 15 Wallace Wright; Tight ends: 84 Kareem Brown; 48 J'Nathan Bullock; 81 Dustin Keller; 45 Richard Owens; 46 Jack Simmons	Offensive linemen: 64 Stanley Daniels G; 66 Alan Faneca G; 60 D'Brickashaw Ferguson T; 78 Wayne Hunter T; 76 Mike Kracalik T; 74 Nick Mangold C; 72 Nevin McCaskill G; 69 Ryan McKee T; 65 Brandon Moore G; 56 Michael Parenton C; 68 Matt Slauson G; 62 Tavita Thompson T; 75 Rob Turner C; 67 Damien Woody T; Defensive linemen: 70 Mike DeVito DE; 93 Marques Douglas DE; 92 Shaun Ellis DE; 95 Howard Green NT; 77 Kris Jenkins NT; 63 Matt Kroul DE; 79 Ropati Pitoitua DE; 98 Zach Potter DE; 91 Sione Pouha NT; 61 Ty Steinkuhler DE	Linebackers: 54 Kenwin Cummings ILB; 50 Vernon Gholston OLB; 52 David Harris ILB; 53 Larry Izzo ILB; 51 Craig Kobel OLB; 94 Marques Murrell OLB; 97 Calvin Pace OLB; 47 Brandon Renkart ILB; 57 Bart Scott ILB; 99 Bryan Thomas OLB; 96 Jason Trusnik ILB; 55 Jamaal Westerman OLB; Defensive backs: 35 Rashad Barksdale CB; 31 Ahmad Carroll CB; 34 Marquice Cole CB; 30 Drew Coleman CB; 38 Emanuel Cook S; 37 Keith Fitzhugh S; 44 James Ihedigbo FS; 36 Jim Leonhard SS; 21 Dwight Lowery CB; 24 Darrelle Revis CB; 25 Kerry Rhodes FS; 26 Lito Sheppard CB; 33 Eric Smith SS; 27 Donald Strickland CB; Special teams: 9 T. J. Conley P; 85 James Dearth LS; 3 Jay Feely K; 5 Reggie Hodges P	Reserve lists: Currently vacant; 80 Active, 0 Inactive

=== Week 1 roster ===
New York Jets 2009 week 1 roster
Quarterbacks: 10 Erik Ainge; 11 Kellen Clemens; 7 Kevin O'Connell; 6 Mark Sanchez; Running backs: 23 Shonn Greene; 20 Thomas Jones; 49 Tony Richardson FB; 29 Leon Washington; Wide receivers: 87 David Clowney; 89 Jerricho Cotchery; 16 Brad Smith; 83 Chansi Stuckey; 15 Wallace Wright; Tight ends: 84 Ben Hartsock; 81 Dustin Keller; 82 Matthew Mulligan	Offensive linemen: 66 Alan Faneca G; 60 D'Brickashaw Ferguson T; 78 Wayne Hunter T; 74 Nick Mangold C; 65 Brandon Moore G; 68 Matt Slauson G; 75 Robert Turner C; 67 Damien Woody T; Defensive linemen: 70 Mike DeVito DE; 93 Marques Douglas DE; 95 Howard Green NT; 77 Kris Jenkins NT; 79 Ropati Pitoitua DE; 91 Sione Pouha NT	Linebackers: 51 Ryan Fowler ILB; 50 Vernon Gholston OLB; 52 David Harris ILB; 53 Larry Izzo ILB; 94 Marques Murrell OLB; 57 Bart Scott ILB; 99 Bryan Thomas OLB; 96 Jason Trusnik OLB; 55 Jamaal Westerman ILB; Defensive backs: 31 Ahmad Carroll CB; 34 Marquice Cole CB; 30 Drew Coleman CB; 44 James Ihedigbo FS; 36 Jim Leonhard SS; 21 Dwight Lowery CB/PR; 24 Darrelle Revis CB; 25 Kerry Rhodes FS; 26 Lito Sheppard CB; 33 Eric Smith SS; 27 Donald Strickland CB; Special teams: 85 James Dearth LS; 3 Jay Feely K; 9 Steve Weatherford P	Reserve lists: 88 Aundrae Allison WR (IR); 92 Shaun Ellis DE (Susp.); 97 Calvin Pace OLB (Susp.); Practice Squad: 54 Kenwin Cummings ILB; 43 Jason Davis FB; 37 Keith Fitzhugh S; 14 Marcus Henry WR; 63 Matt Kroul DE; 69 Ryan McKee OT; 46 Jack Simmons TE; 22 Danny Woodhead RB; 53 Active, 3 Inactive, 8 PS

=== Final roster ===
2009 New York Jets roster
Quarterbacks (QB): 10 Erik Ainge; 11 Kellen Clemens; 7 Kevin O'Connell; 6 Mark Sanchez; Running backs (RB): 23 Shonn Greene; 20 Thomas Jones; 49 Tony Richardson; 32 Chauncey Washington; Wide receivers (WR): 87 David Clowney; 89 Jerricho Cotchery; 17 Braylon Edwards; 16 Brad Smith; 83 Danny Woodhead; 15 Wallace Wright; Tight ends (TE): 84 Ben Hartsock; 81 Dustin Keller; 82 Matthew Mulligan	Offensive linemen (OL): 66 Alan Faneca G; 60 D'Brickashaw Ferguson T; 78 Wayne Hunter T; 74 Nick Mangold C; 65 Brandon Moore G; 68 Matt Slauson G; 75 Robert Turner C/G; 67 Damien Woody T; Defensive linemen (DL): 70 Mike DeVito DE; 93 Marques Douglas DE; 92 Shaun Ellis DE; 95 Howard Green NT; 79 Ropati Pitoitua DE; 91 Sione Po'uha NT	Linebackers (LB): 54 Kenwin Cummings OLB; 51 Ryan Fowler ILB; 50 Vernon Gholston OLB; 52 David Harris ILB; 94 Marques Murrell OLB; 97 Calvin Pace OLB; 57 Bart Scott ILB; 99 Bryan Thomas OLB; 55 Jamaal Westerman OLB; Defensive backs (DB): 34 Marquice Cole CB; 30 Drew Coleman CB; 44 James Ihedigbo SS; 36 Jim Leonhard SS; 21 Dwight Lowery CB; 24 Darrelle Revis CB; 25 Kerry Rhodes FS; 26 Lito Sheppard CB; 33 Eric Smith FS; 27 Donald Strickland CB; Special teams (ST): 85 James Dearth LS; 3 Jay Feely K; 9 Steve Weatherford P	Practice squad: 42 Brannon Condren S; 19 Britt Davis WR; 43 Jason Davis FB; 71 Dan Gay T; 14 Marcus Henry WR; 63 Matt Kroul DE; 56 Michael Parenton C; 61 Ty Steinkuhler DE; Reserve: 88 Aundrae Allison WR (IR); 53 Larry Izzo LB (IR); 77 Kris Jenkins NT (IR); 29 Leon Washington RB (IR); Rookies in italics 53 active, 4 reserve, 8 practice squad

== Schedule ==
=== Preseason ===
Week	Date	Opponent	Result	Record	Venue	Recap
1	August 14	St. Louis Rams	**L** 20–23	0–1	Giants Stadium	Recap
2	August 24	at Baltimore Ravens	**L** 23–24	0–2	M&T Bank Stadium	Recap
3	August 29	at New York Giants	**W** 27–25	1–2	Giants Stadium	Recap
4	September 3	Philadelphia Eagles	**W** 38–27	2–2	Giants Stadium	Recap

=== Regular season ===
Week	Date	Opponent	Result	Record	Venue	Recap
1	September 13	at Houston Texans	**W** 24–7	1–0	Reliant Stadium	Recap
2	September 20	**New England Patriots**	**W** 16–9	2–0	Giants Stadium	Recap
3	September 27	Tennessee Titans	**W** 24–17	3–0	Giants Stadium	Recap
4	October 4	at New Orleans Saints	**L** 10–24	3–1	Louisiana Superdome	Recap
5	October 12	at **Miami Dolphins**	**L** 27–31	3–2	Land Shark Stadium	Recap
6	October 18	**Buffalo Bills**	**L** 13–16 (OT)	3–3	Giants Stadium	Recap
7	October 25	at Oakland Raiders	**W** 38–0	4–3	Oakland–Alameda County Coliseum	Recap
8	November 1	**Miami Dolphins**	**L** 25–30	4–4	Giants Stadium	Recap
9	Bye					
10	November 15	Jacksonville Jaguars	**L** 22–24	4–5	Giants Stadium	Recap
11	November 22	at **New England Patriots**	**L** 14–31	4–6	Gillette Stadium	Recap
12	November 29	Carolina Panthers	**W** 17–6	5–6	Giants Stadium	Recap
13	December 3	at **Buffalo Bills**	**W** 19–13	6–6	(Canada) Rogers Centre (Toronto)	Recap
14	December 13	at Tampa Bay Buccaneers	**W** 26–3	7–6	Raymond James Stadium	Recap
15	December 20	Atlanta Falcons	**L** 7–10	7–7	Giants Stadium	Recap
16	December 27	at Indianapolis Colts	**W** 29–15	8–7	Lucas Oil Stadium	Recap
17	January 3	Cincinnati Bengals	**W** 37–0	9–7	Giants Stadium	Recap

Note: Intra-division opponents are in bold text.

== Standings ==
AFC East
	W	L	T	PCT	DIV	CONF	PF	PA	STK
^{(3)} New England Patriots	10	6	0	.625	4–2	7–5	427	285	L1
^{(5)} New York Jets	9	7	0	.563	2–4	7–5	348	236	W2
Miami Dolphins	7	9	0	.438	4–2	5–7	360	390	L3
Buffalo Bills	6	10	0	.375	2–4	4–8	258	326	W1

== Game summaries ==
=== Week 1: at Houston Texans ===
Quarter	1	2	3	4	Total
Jets	3	7	7	7	24
Texans	0	0	0	7	7

at Reliant Stadium, Houston, Texas

- Game time: 1:00 pm EDT
- Game weather: 77 °F or 25 °C (Partly Cloudy)
- Game attendance: 70,118
- Referee: Ed Hochuli
- TV announcers (CBS): Jim Nantz & Phil Simms

Game information

First quarter

- NYJ – Jay Feely 24-yard field goal, 0:08. Jets 3–0. Drive: 16 plays, 66 yards, 8:27.

Second quarter

- NYJ – Chansi Stuckey 30-yard pass from Mark Sanchez (Jay Feely kick), 3:21. Jets 10–0. Drive: 10 plays, 78 yards, 4:08.

Third quarter

- NYJ – Thomas Jones 1-yard run (Jay Feely kick), 7:35. Jets 17–0. Drive: 12 plays, 85 yards, 7:25.

Fourth quarter

- HOU – Dominique Barber 48-yard fumble return (Kris Brown kick), 12:18. Jets 17–7.
- NYJ – Thomas Jones 38-yard run (Jay Feely kick), 10:10. Jets 24–7. Drive: 4 plays, 80 yards, 2:08.

Top passers

- NYJ – Mark Sanchez – 18/31, 272 yards, TD, INT
- HOU – Matt Schaub – 18/33, 166 yards, INT

Top rushers

- NYJ – Thomas Jones – 20 rushes, 107 yards, 2 TD
- HOU – Steve Slaton – 9 rushes, 17 yards

Top receivers

- NYJ – Dustin Keller – 4 receptions, 94 yards
- HOU – Owen Daniels – 4 receptions, 44 yards

The Jets began their season at Reliant Stadium for a Week 1 showdown with the Houston Texans. The Jets took off in the first quarter as kicker Jay Feely nailed a 24-yard field goal. In the second quarter, the Jets would increase their lead as rookie quarterback Mark Sanchez completed his first career touchdown pass as he connected with wide receiver Chansi Stuckey on a 30-yard pass. In the third quarter, the Jets continued their run as running back Thomas Jones got a 1-yard touchdown run. The Texans tried to rally in the fourth quarter as safety Dominique Barber returned a fumble 48 yards for a touchdown, but the Jets would end the game with Jones getting a 38-yard touchdown run.

With the win, not only did the Jets begin their season at 1–0, but Sanchez (18-of-31, 272 yards, 1 TD, 1 INT) would become the first Jets rookie QB since Richard Todd in 1976 to win a game.

=== Week 2: vs. New England Patriots ===
Quarter	1	2	3	4	Total
Patriots	3	6	0	0	9
Jets	0	3	10	3	16

at Giants Stadium, East Rutherford, New Jersey

- Game time: 1:00 pm EDT
- Game weather: 69 °F or 20.6 °C (Clear)
- Game attendance: 78,312
- Referee: John Parry
- TV announcers (CBS): Greg Gumbel & Dan Dierdorf

Game information

First quarter

- NE – Stephen Gostkowski 45-yard field goal, 6:50. Patriots 3–0. Drive: 4 plays, 12 yards, 1:46.

Second quarter

- NE – Stephen Gostkowski 25-yard field goal, 11:30. Patriots 6–0. Drive: 9 plays, 53 yards, 3:30.
- NYJ – Jay Feely 33-yard field goal, 5:59. Patriots 6–3. Drive: 10 plays, 52 yards, 5:31.
- NE – Stephen Gostkowski 29-yard field goal, 0:17. Patriots 9–3. Drive: 14 plays, 79 yards, 5:42.

Third quarter

- NYJ – Dustin Keller 9-yard pass from Mark Sanchez (Jay Feely kick), 13:57. Jets 10–9. Drive: 3 plays, 49 yards, 1:03.
- NYJ – Jay Feely 24-yard field goal, 8:22. Jets 13–9. Drive: 11 plays, 55 yards, 3:59.

Fourth quarter

- NYJ – Jay Feely 39-yard field goal, 9:48. Jets 16–9. Drive: 14 plays, 63 yards, 8:21.

Top passers

- NE – Tom Brady – 23/47, 216 yards, INT
- NYJ – Mark Sanchez – 14/22, 163 yards, TD

Top rushers

- NE – Fred Taylor – 8 rushes, 46 yards
- NYJ – Leon Washington – 14 rushes, 58 yards

Top receivers

- NE – Julian Edelman – 8 receptions, 98 yards
- NYJ – Jerricho Cotchery – 4 receptions, 87 yards

Coming off an impressive road win over the Texans, the Jets played their Week 2 home opener against their AFC East rival, the New England Patriots. In the week prior to the game, first-year Jets head coach Rex Ryan placed a phone message to all Jets season ticket holders asking them to "make it miserable for (Tom) Brady and company," following up on his comments during the off-season that he would not "kiss Bill Belichick's Super Bowl rings." He told the Jets fans that "the Patriots had a better head coach and a better quarterback," but that the game would decide "who has a better team." Meanwhile, Jets safety Kerry Rhodes said the Jets intended on not just winning, but "embarrassing" the Patriots in the game, while nose tackle Kris Jenkins called it the Jets' version of the Super Bowl; the Jets had not defeated the Patriots at home since 2000. On the first drive of the game, without an injured Wes Welker, the Patriots drove to the Jets' 36-yard line before having to punt. The Jets' first play from scrimmage was a strip-sack of rookie quarterback Mark Sanchez by defensive lineman Mike Wright; Sanchez recovered the fumble at the Jets' 3-yard line. On 4th-and-24, the Jets punted back to their own 49-yard line; the Patriots could not capitalize on the field position and went three-and-out. However, Jets running back Leon Washington fumbled on the next play; cornerback Leigh Bodden recovered it at the Jets' 17-yard line. Two holding penalties would push the Patriots back to the Jets' 37-yard line, setting up a 45-yard Stephen Gostkowski field goal to give the Patriots a 3–0 lead. Following a Jets three-and-out, the Patriots moved to their own 41-yard line before Jets cornerback Darrelle Revis intercepted a pass intended for Randy Moss at the Jets' 16-yard line. The Jets offense would continue to struggle, however, going three-and-out again to end the first quarter. The Patriots began the second quarter with a 9-play, 53-yard drive, one that stalled at the Jets' 7-yard line; the Patriots settled for another Stephen Gostkowski field goal, extending their lead to 6–0. The Jets would pick up their initial first down of the game on their next possession, going 52 yards on 10 plays before a Jay Feely 33-yard field goal cut the Patriots' lead in half. Starting from their own 10-yard line after a holding penalty on Sam Aiken on the kickoff, the Patriots took nearly six minutes off the clock, reaching the Jets' 11-yard line before two incomplete passes by Brady prevented the Patriots scoring their first touchdown of the game. Instead, Gostkowski kicked his third field goal of the day to increase the Patriots' lead to 9–3 going into halftime. Receiving the opening kickoff of the second half due to their deferral of the opening coin toss, the Jets took the lead in barely a minute. Following a 43-yard kick return by Washington, Sanchez hit wide receiver Jerricho Cotchery for 45 yards and a play later connected with tight end Dustin Keller on a 9-yard touchdown pass. The 10–9 lead was the first for the Jets over the Patriots at home since 2001. After a Patriots three-and-out, punter Chris Hanson's 30-yard punt gave the Jets the ball at the Patriots' 45-yard line. From the Patriots' 6-yard line, Sanchez appeared to throw a touchdown pass to Chansi Stuckey, but the catch was overturned after the Patriots challenged. Two plays later, Feely hit his second field goal of the day to give the Jets a 13–9 lead. The Patriots' ensuing possession reached the Jets' 35-yard line on a third down, but back-to-back delay of game penalties on Tom Brady, an incomplete pass, and a face-mask penalty on Moss on the punt backed the Patriots up to their own 40-yard line. However, Hanson's subsequent attempt was better than the first, nullified by the penalty, and the Jets began their next drive from their own 15-yard line. On a 14-play, 63-yard drive that spanned into the fourth quarter, the Jets extended their lead to 16–9 on a 39-yard Feely field goal. The Patriots started their next drive from their own 15-yard line as well, but were unable to reach midfield before punting. A Jets three-and-out gave the Patriots another opportunity with five minutes remaining, but a Ben Watson holding penalty in the middle of the drive helped set up a 2nd-and-20 situation and eventually another punt. Just before the two-minute warning, Sanchez was sacked, but a penalty on BenJarvus Green-Ellis on the ensuing punt meant the Patriots had to start their last drive of the game from their own 10-yard line. After a Julian Edelman 18-yard reception began it, four straight in-completions ended the drive and the game. With the win, not only did the Jets improve to 2–0, but it also marked the first time that they defeated the Patriots at home since 2000. This also marked the first time that New England was held without a touchdown since December 10, 2006. Rex Ryan would become the first Jets rookie head coach since Al Groh to win their first two games.

=== Week 3: vs. Tennessee Titans ===
Quarter	1	2	3	4	Total
Titans	0	10	7	0	17
Jets	14	0	7	3	24

at Giants Stadium, East Rutherford, New Jersey

- Game time: 1:00 pm EDT
- Game weather: 66 °F or 18.9 °C (Rain)
- Game attendance: 75,863
- Referee: Mike Carey
- TV announcers (CBS): Greg Gumbel & Dan Dierdorf

Game information

First quarter

- NYJ – Mark Sanchez 14-yard run (Jay Feely kick), 9:40. Jets 7–0. Drive: 10 plays, 73 yards, 5:20.
- NYJ – Ben Hartsock 2-yard pass from Mark Sanchez (Jay Feely kick), 6:51. Jets 14–0. Drive: 5 plays, 19 yards, 2:40.

Second quarter

- TEN – Lendale White 5-yard run (Rob Bironas kick), 9:24. Jets 14–7. Drive: 10 plays, 51 yards, 5:23.
- TEN – Rob Bironas 38-yard field goal, 0:08. Jets 14–10. Drive: 12 plays, 60 yards, 1:46.

Third quarter

- TEN – Nate Washington 9-yard pass from Kerry Collins (Rob Bironas kick), 11:34. Titans 17–14. Drive: 7 plays, 60 yards, 3:26.
- NYJ – Jerricho Cotchery 6-yard pass from Mark Sanchez (Jay Feely kick), 5:07. Jets 21–17. Drive: 8 plays, 22 yards, 1:49.

Fourth quarter

- NYJ – Jay Feely 30-yard field goal, 11:36. Jets 24–17. Drive: 5 plays, 48 yards, 1:54.

Top passers

- TEN – Kerry Collins – 15/37, 170 yards, TD, 2 INT
- NYJ – Mark Sanchez – 17/30, 171 yards, 2 TD, INT

Top rushers

- TEN – Chris Johnson – 22 rushes, 97 yards
- NYJ – Leon Washington – 12 rushes, 46 yards

Top receivers

- TEN – Kenny Britt – 4 receptions, 59 yards
- NYJ – Jerricho Cotchery – 8 receptions, 108 yards, TD

The Jets wore New York Titans throwback uniforms for an AFL Legacy Game with the Tennessee Titans, who wore 1960s Houston Oilers uniforms. The game was originally scheduled for a 4:15 PM start time but due to the Jewish holiday at sundown, Woody Johnson wrote a letter to the NFL asking to move the game to a 1:00 PM start time so more people could attend the game.

The Jets would take flight in the first quarter with rookie quarterback Mark Sanchez getting a 14-yard touchdown run. And later in the first he completed a 2-yard touchdown pass to tight end Ben Hartsock. The Titans would answer in the second quarter with running back LenDale White's 5-yard touchdown run and kicker Rob Bironas' 38-yard field goal. This made the score 14–10 with the Jets leading.

Tennessee would take the lead in the third quarter with quarterback Kerry Collins' 9-yard touchdown pass to wide receiver Nate Washington, yet the Jets came right back with Sanchez's 6-yard touchdown pass to wide receiver Jerricho Cotchery. In the fourth quarter, the Jets would add onto their lead with a 30-yard field goal from kicker Jay Feely. Afterwards, the defense would prevent any possible comeback attempts from the Titans.

With the win, not only did the Jets improve to 3–0, but Sanchez (17-of-30, 171 yards, 2 TDs, 1 INT) would become the first rookie quarterback since the AFL–NFL merger of 1970 to win their first three games. Also, this marked the first time since 2004 that the Jets started a season at 3–0.

=== Week 4: at New Orleans Saints ===
Quarter	1	2	3	4	Total
Jets	0	3	7	0	10
Saints	3	14	0	7	24

at Louisiana Superdome, New Orleans, Louisiana

- Game time: 4:05 pm EDT
- Game weather: None (Domed Stadium)
- Game attendance: 70,009
- Referee: Bill Leavy
- TV announcers (CBS): Greg Gumbel & Dan Dierdorf

Game information

First quarter

- NO – John Carney 34-yard field goal, 8:06. Saints 3–0. Drive: 13 plays, 60 yards, 6:54.

Second quarter

- NO – Darren Sharper 99-yard interception return (John Carney kick), 14:45. Saints 10–0.
- NO – Remi Ayodele 0-yard fumble return (John Carney kick), 9:00. Saints 17–0.
- NYJ – Jay Feely 38-yard field goal, 1:48. Saints 17–3. Drive: 14 plays, 60 yards, 7:12.

Third quarter

- NYJ – Thomas Jones 15-yard run (Jay Feely kick), 7:48. Saints 17–10. Drive: 4 plays, 34 yards, 1:16.

Fourth quarter

- NO – Pierre Thomas 1-yard run (John Carney kick), 6:07. Saints 24–10. Drive: 11 plays, 74 yards, 6:49.

Top passers

- NYJ – Mark Sanchez – 14/27, 138 yards, 3 INT
- NO – Drew Brees – 20/32, 190 yards

Top rushers

- NYJ – Thomas Jones – 13 rushes, 48 yards, TD
- NO – Pierre Thomas – 19 rushes, 86 yards, TD

Top receivers

- NYJ – Jerricho Cotchery – 5 receptions, 71 yards
- NO – Pierre Thomas – 4 receptions, 46 yards

Coming off their home win over the Titans, the Jets flew to the Louisiana Superdome for a Week 4 interconference duel with the New Orleans Saints. The Jets would find themselves struggling early with Saints kicker John Carney making a 34-yard field goal. New Orleans would take command in the second quarter with safety Darren Sharper returning an interception 99 yards for a touchdown, followed by rookie quarterback Mark Sanchez fumbling the ball in his own endzone (due to a sack by defensive end Will Smith), which was recovered by defensive tackle Remi Ayodele for a touchdown. The Jets would close out the half with a 38-yard field goal from kicker Jay Feely.

The Jets tried to make a comeback run as running back Thomas Jones got a 15-yard touchdown run in the third quarter, but the Saints sealed the victory with running back Pierre Thomas' 1-yard touchdown run and a stiff defensive effort.

With the loss, the Jets fell to 3–1.

=== Week 5: at Miami Dolphins ===
Quarter	1	2	3	4	Total
Jets	7	6	0	14	27
Dolphins	10	0	0	21	31

at Land Shark Stadium, Miami Gardens, Florida

- Game time: 8:30 pm EDT
- Game weather: 83 °F or 28.3 °C (Clear)
- Game attendance: 69,767
- Referee: Alberto Riveron
- TV announcers (ESPN): Mike Tirico, Ron Jaworski, & Jon Gruden

Game information

First quarter

- MIA – Ronnie Brown 1-yard run (Dan Carpenter kick), 7:31. Dolphins 7–0. Drive: 12 plays, 80 yards, 7:29.
- NYJ – Braylon Edwards 3-yard pass from Mark Sanchez (Jay Feely kick), 3:51. Tied 7–7. Drive: 8 plays, 70 yards, 3:40.
- MIA – Dan Carpenter 35-yard field goal, 0:57. Dolphins 10–7. Drive: 6 plays, 62 yards, 2:54.

Second quarter

- NYJ – Jay Feely 40-yard field goal, 2:05. Tied 10–10. Drive: 11 plays, 57 yards, 6:06.
- NYJ – Jay Feely 43-yard field goal, 0:04. Jets 13–10. Drive: 6 plays, 31 yards, 0:57.

Third quarter

- No scoring plays

Fourth quarter

- MIA – Anthony Fasano 2-yard pass from Chad Henne (Dan Carpenter kick), 14:17. Dolphins 17–13. Drive: 15 plays, 64 yards, 8:41.
- NYJ – Thomas Jones 1-yard run (Jay Feely kick), 12:17. Jets 20–17. Drive: 5 plays, 78 yards, 2:00.
- MIA – Ted Ginn Jr. 53-yard pass from Chad Henne (Dan Carpenter kick), 10:10. Dolphins 24–20. Drive: 5 plays, 84 yards, 2:07.
- NYJ – Thomas Jones 3-yard run (Jay Feely kick), 5:12. Jets 27–24. Drive: 4 plays, 63 yards, 1:43.
- MIA – Ronnie Brown 2-yard run (Dan Carpenter kick), 0:06. Dolphins 31–27. Drive: 13 plays, 70 yards, 5:06.

Top passers

- NYJ – Mark Sanchez – 12/24, 172 yards, TD
- MIA – Chad Henne – 20/26, 241 yards, 2 TD

Top rushers

- NYJ – Leon Washington – 11 rushes, 45 yards
- MIA – Ronnie Brown – 21 rushes, 74 yards, 2 TD

Top receivers

- NYJ – David Clowney – 4 receptions, 72 yards
- MIA – Ricky Williams – 3 receptions, 70 yards

Hoping to rebound from their road loss to the Saints, the Jets flew to Land Shark Stadium for a Week 5 Monday Night duel with their AFC East rival, the Miami Dolphins. The Jets immediately trailed as the Dolphins took the game's opening drive and capped it off with a 1-yard touchdown run from running Ronnie Brown. The Jets immediately responded with rookie quarterback Mark Sanchez completing a 3-yard touchdown pass to newly acquired wide receiver Braylon Edwards. Afterwards, Miami closed out the opening quarter with a 35-yard field goal from kicker Dan Carpenter. In the second quarter, the Jets took the lead as kicker Jay Feely got a 40-yard and a 43-yard field goal.

After a scoreless third quarter, both the Jets and the Dolphins would get involved in a back-and-forth fourth quarter. Miami opened up the period with quarterback Chad Henne hooking up with tight end Anthony Fasano on a 2-yard touchdown pass, while the Jets got a 1-yard touchdown run from running back Thomas Jones. The Dolphins would immediately respond as Henne threw a 53-yard touchdown pass to wide receiver Ted Ginn Jr., but Jones came through again with a 3-yard touchdown run. Late in the game, Miami managed to crack through the Jets' defense as Brown got a 2-yard touchdown run. The Jets tried to rally, but Sanchez's last-second Hail Mary pass was knocked away.

With the loss, the Jets fell to 3–2.

=== Week 6: vs. Buffalo Bills ===
Quarter	1	2	3	4	OT	Total
Bills	3	0	10	0	3	16
Jets	3	10	0	0	0	13

at Giants Stadium, East Rutherford, New Jersey

- Game time: 4:15 pm EDT
- Game weather: 44 °F or 6.7 °C (Cloudy)
- Game attendance: 76,048
- Referee: Walt Coleman
- TV announcers (CBS): Dick Enberg & Dan Fouts

Game information

First quarter

- BUF – Rian Lindell 33-yard field goal, 7:21. Bills 3–0. Drive: 10 plays, 47 yards, 6:31.
- NYJ – Jay Feely 23-yard field goal, 0:35. Tied 3–3. Drive: 14 plays, 87 yards, 6:46.

Second quarter

- NYJ – Jay Feely 41-yard field goal, 9:45. Jets 6–3. Drive: 5 plays, 67 yards, 2:41.
- NYJ – Thomas Jones 71-yard run (Jay Feely kick), 7:31. Jets 13–3. Drive: 2 plays, 67 yards, 0:35.

Third quarter

- BUF – Rian Lindell 25-yard field goal, 7:45. Jets 13–6. Drive: 9 plays, 36 yards, 4:44.
- BUF – Lee Evans 37-yard pass from Ryan Fitzpatrick (Rian Lindell kick), 2:30. Tied 13–13. Drive: 6 plays, 64 yards, 2:44.

Fourth quarter

- No scoring plays

Overtime

- BUF – Rian Lindell 47-yard field goal, 2:49. Bills 16–13. Drive: 9 plays, 52 yards, 3:41.

Top passers

- BUF – Ryan Fitzpatrick – 10/25, 116 yards, TD, INT
- NYJ – Mark Sanchez – 10/29, 119 yards, 5 INT

Top rushers

- BUF – Marshawn Lynch – 19 rushes, 61 yards
- NYJ – Thomas Jones – 22 rushes, 210 yards, TD

Top receivers

- BUF – Lee Evans – 4 receptions, 68 yards, TD
- NYJ – Leon Washington – 3 receptions, 46 yards

Hoping to snap a two-game losing streak, the Jets went home for a Week 6 AFC East duel with the Buffalo Bills. Both teams began the first quarter with field goals, as Bills kicker Rian Lindell made a 33-yard field goal and Jets kicker Jay Feely hit a 23-yard field goal. In the second quarter, the Jets soared into the lead with Feely's 41-yard field goal and running back Thomas Jones' 71-yard touchdown run. However, Buffalo rallied to tie the game in the third quarter with Lindell's 25-yard field goal and quarterback Ryan Fitzpatrick's 37-yard touchdown pass to wide receiver Lee Evans. After both teams failed to get any point in the fourth quarter, the game went into overtime. Despite getting the ball to start off OT, the Jets failed to get any point out of their opening drive. After a hard-fought period, the Bills would emerge on top as Lindell booted the game-winning 47-yard field goal.

With the loss, the Jets fell to 3–3.

Thomas Jones would have a career day as he ran 22 times for a franchise-best 210 yards (in addition to his rushing touchdown).

=== Week 7: at Oakland Raiders ===
Quarter	1	2	3	4	Total
Jets	14	10	7	7	38
Raiders	0	0	0	0	0

at Oakland–Alameda County Coliseum, Oakland, California

- Game time: 4:05 pm EDT
- Game weather: 70 °F or 21.1 °C (Sunny)
- Game attendance: 39,354
- Referee: Gene Steratore
- TV announcers (CBS): Greg Gumbel & Dan Dierdorf

Game information

First quarter

- NYJ – Thomas Jones 1-yard run (Jay Feely kick), 12:54. Jets 7–0. Drive: 4 plays, 1 yard, 1:54.
- NYJ – Mark Sanchez 3-yard run (Jay Feely kick), 4:20. Jets 14–0. Drive: 2 plays, 4 yards, 0:40.

Second quarter

- NYJ – Shonn Greene 8-yard run (Jay Feely kick), 5:51. Jets 21–0. Drive: 10 plays, 93 yards, 5:31.
- NYJ – Jay Feely 39-yard field goal, 0:02. Jets 24–0. Drive: 12 plays, 76 yards, 5:12.

Third quarter

- NYJ – David Clowney 35-yard pass from Mark Sanchez (Jay Feely kick), 5:28. Jets 31–0. Drive: 5 plays, 66 yards, 1:58.

Fourth quarter

- NYJ – Shonn Greene 33-yard run (Jay Feely kick), 6:30. Jets 38–0. Drive: 7 plays, 79 yards, 4:27.

Top passers

- NYJ – Mark Sanchez – 9/16, 143 yards, TD
- OAK – Bruce Gradkowski – 10/19, 97 yards

Top rushers

- NYJ – Shonn Greene – 19 rushes, 144 yards, 2 TD
- OAK – Justin Fargas – 8 rushes, 67 yards

Top receivers

- NYJ – David Clowney – 4 receptions, 79 yards, TD
- OAK – Louis Murphy – 4 receptions, 58 yards

Hoping to snap a three-game losing streak, the Jets flew to the Oakland–Alameda County Coliseum, donned their throwbacks, and played a Week 7 AFL Legacy game with the Oakland Raiders. The Jets took flight in the first quarter with a 1-yard touchdown run from running back Thomas Jones and a 3-yard touchdown run from rookie quarterback Mark Sanchez. They would increase their lead in the second quarter with rookie running back Shonn Greene getting an 8-yard touchdown run, followed by kicker Jay Feely booting a 39-yard field goal. Afterwards, the Jets would pull away with Sanchez's 35-yard touchdown pass to wide receiver David Clowney in the third quarter and Greene's 33-yard touchdown run in the fourth.

With the win, the Jets improved to 4–3.

=== Week 8: vs. Miami Dolphins ===
Quarter	1	2	3	4	Total
Dolphins	0	3	21	6	30
Jets	0	3	16	6	25

at Giants Stadium, East Rutherford, New Jersey

- Game time: 1:00 pm EST
- Game weather: 54 °F or 12.2 °C (cloudy)
- Game attendance: 77,531
- Referee: Don Carey
- TV announcers (CBS): Jim Nantz & Phil Simms

Game information

First quarter

- No scoring plays

Second quarter

- NYJ – Jay Feely 23-yard field goal, 12:20. Jets 3–0. Drive: 11 plays, 60 yards, 4:18.
- MIA – Dan Carpenter 48-yard field goal, 1:55. Tied 3–3. Drive: 5 plays, 15 yards, 2:14.

Third quarter

- NYJ – Jay Feely 55-yard field goal, 10:24. Jets 6–3. Drive: 7 plays, 14 yards, 3:10.
- MIA – Ted Ginn Jr. 100-yard kickoff return (Dan Carpenter kick), 10:10. Dolphins 10–6.
- MIA – Jason Taylor 48-yard fumble return (Dan Carpenter kick), 7:32. Dolphins 17–6.
- NYJ – Mark Sanchez 1-yard run (Jay Feely kick), 3:26. Dolphins 17–13. Drive: 9 plays, 33 yards, 2:22.
- MIA – Ted Ginn Jr. 101-yard kickoff return (Dan Carpenter kick), 3:09. Dolphins 24–13.
- NYJ – Braylon Edwards 19-yard pass from Mark Sanchez (pass failed), 1:35. Dolphins 24–19. Drive: 3 plays, 74 yards, 1:34.

Fourth quarter

- MIA – Joey Haynos 5-yard pass from Chad Henne (pass failed), 8:48. Dolphins 30–19. Drive: 13 plays, 67 yards, 7:47.
- NYJ – Dustin Keller 16-yard pass from Mark Sanchez (pass failed), 5:52. Dolphins 30–25. Drive: 6 plays, 74 yards, 2:56.

Top passers

- MIA – Chad Henne – 12/21, 112 yards, TD
- NYJ – Mark Sanchez – 20/35, 265 yards, 2 TD

Top rushers

- MIA – Ricky Williams – 8 rushes, 27 yards
- NYJ – Thomas Jones – 27 rushes, 102 yards

Top receivers

- MIA – Ricky Williams – 2 receptions, 41 yards
- NYJ – Dustin Keller – 8 receptions, 76 yards, TD

Coming off their shutout road win over the Raiders, the Jets went home, donned their white New York Titans uniforms again, and played a Week 8 divisional rematch with the Miami Dolphins. After a scoreless first quarter, the teams exchanged field goals, with Jets kicker Jay Feely making a 23-yard field goal, followed by Dolphins kicker Dan Carpenter getting a 48-yard field goal.

In a back-and-forth third quarter, the Jets began the scoring with Feely making a 55-yard field goal. Miami immediately answered with wide receiver Ted Ginn Jr. returning a kickoff 100 yards for a touchdown, followed by linebacker Jason Taylor returning a fumble 48 yards for a touchdown. The Jets replied with rookie quarterback Mark Sanchez getting a 1-yard touchdown run, but the Dolphins came back as Ginn Jr. returned a kickoff 101 yards for a touchdown. The Jets then closed out the period with Sanchez hooking up with wide receiver Braylon Edwards on a 19-yard touchdown pass (with a failed two-point conversion). In the fourth quarter, Miami struck again as quarterback Chad Henne found tight end Joey Haynos on a 5-yard touchdown pass (with a failed two-point conversion). The Jets tried to rally as Sanchez completed a 16-yard touchdown pass to tight end Dustin Keller (with another two-point conversion), but New York's rally fell short.

With the loss, the Jets went into their bye week at 4–4.

=== Week 10: vs. Jacksonville Jaguars ===
Quarter	1	2	3	4	Total
Jaguars	7	14	0	3	24
Jets	10	3	0	9	22

at Giants Stadium, East Rutherford, New Jersey

- Game time: 1:00 pm EST
- Game weather: 62 °F or 16.7 °C (Cloudy)
- Game attendance: 76,313
- Referee: Ed Hochuli
- TV announcers (CBS): Dick Enberg & Dan Fouts

Game information

First quarter

- JAX – Maurice Jones-Drew 33-yard run (Josh Scobee kick), 11:56. Jaguars 7–0. Drive: 5 plays, 55 yards, 2:40.
- NYJ – Jay Feely 32-yard field goal, 8:21. Jaguars 7–3. Drive: 8 plays, 30 yards, 3:35.
- NYJ – Jerricho Cotchery 7-yard pass from Mark Sanchez (Jay Feely kick), 1:08. Jets 10–7. Drive: 5 plays, 61 yards, 1:57.

Second quarter

- JAX – David Garrard 11-yard run (Josh Scobee kick), 10:52. Jaguars 14–10. Drive: 11 plays, 70 yards, 5:16.
- JAX – Mike Sims-Walker 26-yard pass from David Garrard (Josh Scobee kick), 2:44. Jaguars 21–10. Drive: 10 plays, 86 yards, 5:14.
- NYJ – Jay Feely 37-yard field goal, 0:36. Jaguars 21–13. Drive: 7 plays, 53 yards, 2:08.

Third quarter

- No scoring plays

Fourth quarter

- NYJ – Jay Feely 40-yard field goal, 14:39. Jaguars 21–16. Drive: 14 plays, 60 yards, 7:12.
- NYJ – Thomas Jones 1-yard run (pass failed), 5:04. Jets 22–21. Drive: 16 plays, 77 yards, 7:37.
- JAX – Josh Scobee 21-yard field goal, 0:00. Jaguars 24–22. Drive: 12 plays, 69 yards, 5:04.

Top passers

- JAX – David Garrard – 16/26, 221 yards, TD
- NYJ – Mark Sanchez – 16/30, 212 yards, TD, 2 INT

Top rushers

- JAX – Maurice Jones-Drew – 24 rushes, 123 yards, TD
- NYJ – Thomas Jones – 21 rushes, 77 yards, TD

Top receivers

- JAX – Marcedes Lewis – 2 receptions, 58 yards
- NYJ – Braylon Edwards – 3 receptions, 79 yards

Coming off their bye week, the Jets stayed at home for a Week 10 duel with the Jacksonville Jaguars. The Jets would trail early in the first quarter with running back Maurice Jones-Drew's 33-yard touchdown run, but would respond with kicker Jay Feely getting a 32-yard field goal, followed by rookie quarterback Mark Sanchez completing a 7-yard touchdown pass to wide receiver Jerricho Cotchery. In the second quarter, Jacksonville would take the lead as quarterback David Garrard got an 11-yard touchdown run and completed a 26-yard touchdown pass to wide receiver Mike Sims-Walker. The Jets would close out the half with Feely making a 37-yard field goal.

After a scoreless third quarter, the Jets would regain the lead in the fourth quarter with a 40-yard field goal from Feely and a 1-yard touchdown run from running back Thomas Jones (with a failed 2-point conversion). However, the Jaguars got the last laugh as kicker Josh Scobee booted the game-winning 21-yard field goal.

With the loss, the Jets fell to 4–5.

=== Week 11: at New England Patriots ===
Quarter	1	2	3	4	Total
Jets	0	7	7	0	14
Patriots	14	10	0	7	31

at Gillette Stadium, Foxborough, Massachusetts

- Game time: 4:15 pm EST
- Game weather: 45 °F or 7.2 °C (Cloudy)
- Game attendance: 68,756
- Referee: Jeff Triplette
- TV announcers (CBS): Jim Nantz & Phil Simms

Game information

First quarter

- NE – Leigh Bodden 53-yard interception return (Stephen Gostkowski kick), 5:47. Patriots 7–0.
- NE – Randy Moss 4-yard pass from Tom Brady (Stephen Gostkowski kick), 0:00. Patriots 14–0. Drive: 9 plays, 76 yards, 4:16.

Second quarter

- NE – Laurence Maroney 2-yard run (Stephen Gostkowski kick), 10:19. Patriots 21–0. Drive: 7 plays, 59 yards, 3:36.
- NE – Stephen Gostkowski 26-yard field goal, 4:14. Patriots 24–0. Drive: 10 plays, 44 yards, 5:05.
- NYJ – Brad Smith 4-yard blocked punt return (Jay Feely kick), 0:50. Patriots 24–7.

Third quarter

- NYJ – Jerricho Cotchery 29-yard pass from Mark Sanchez (Jay Feely kick), 9:45. Patriots 24–14. Drive: 11 plays, 80 yards, 5:15.

Fourth quarter

- NE – Laurence Maroney 1-yard run (Stephen Gostkowski kick), 5:06. Patriots 31–14. Drive: 8 plays, 35 yards, 4:47.

Top passers

- NYJ – Mark Sanchez – 8/21, 136 yards, TD, 4 INT
- NE – Tom Brady – 28/41, 310 yards, TD

Top rushers

- NYJ – Thomas Jones – 21 rushes, 103 yards
- NE – Laurence Maroney – 22 rushes, 77 yards, 2 TD

Top receivers

- NYJ – Jerricho Cotchery – 3 receptions, 84 yards, TD
- NE – Wes Welker – 15 receptions, 192 yards

Trying to avoid three straight losses, the Jets flew to Gillette Stadium for a Week 11 AFC East rematch with the New England Patriots. In the first quarter, the Jets struggled early on both sides of the ball as Patriots cornerback Leigh Bodden returned an interception 53 yards for a touchdown, followed by quarterback Tom Brady completing a 4-yard touchdown pass to wide receiver Randy Moss. In the second quarter, the Jets continued to trail as running back Laurence Maroney got a 2-yard touchdown run, while kicker Stephen Gostkowski made a 26-yard field goal. The Jets would close out the half with wide receiver Brad Smith returning a blocked punt 4 yards for a touchdown.

In the third quarter, the Jets tried to come back as quarterback Mark Sanchez threw a 29-yard touchdown pass to wide receiver Jerricho Cotchery, but New England would pull away in the fourth quarter with Maroney's 1-yard touchdown run.

With the loss, the Jets fell to 4–6.

=== Week 12: vs. Carolina Panthers ===
Quarter	1	2	3	4	Total
Panthers	0	3	0	3	6
Jets	7	7	0	3	17

at Giants Stadium, East Rutherford, New Jersey

- Game time: 1:00 pm EST
- Game weather: 53 °F or 11.7 °C (Clear)
- Game attendance: 76,381
- Referee: Jerome Boger
- TV announcers (Fox): Thom Brennaman, Brian Billick & Chris Myers

Game information

First quarter

- NYJ – Darrelle Revis 67-yard interception return (Jay Feely kick), 8:48. Jets 7–0.

Second quarter

- CAR – John Kasay 40-yard field goal, 10:11. Jets 7–3. Drive: 8 plays, 14 yards, 4:34.
- NYJ – Thomas Jones 3-yard run (Jay Feely kick), 0:28. Jets 14–3. Drive: 5 plays, 38 yards, 1:20.

Third quarter

- No scoring plays

Fourth quarter

- CAR – John Kasay 28-yard field goal, 11:45. Jets 14–6. Drive: 7 plays, 50 yards, 2:27.
- NYJ – Jay Feely 47-yard field goal, 3:39. Jets 17–6. Drive: 7 plays, 31 yards, 4:07.

Top passers

- CAR – Jake Delhomme – 14/34, 130 yards, 4 INT
- NYJ – Mark Sanchez – 13/17, 154 yards, INT

Top rushers

- CAR – DeAngelo Williams – 16 rushes, 40 yards
- NYJ – Thomas Jones – 25 rushes, 75 yards, TD

Top receivers

- CAR – Dante Rosario – 4 receptions, 62 yards
- NYJ – Dustin Keller – 4 receptions, 68 yards

Trying to snap a three-game losing streak, the Jets went home for a Week 12 interconference duel with the Carolina Panthers. The Jets would take off in the first quarter as cornerback Darrelle Revis returned an interception 67 yards for a touchdown. The Panthers would get on the board as kicker John Kasay made a 40-yard field goal, yet the Jets would answer with a 3-yard touchdown run from running back Thomas Jones. After a scoreless third quarter, Carolina tried to rally in the fourth quarter with Kasay nailing a 28-yard field goal. Afterwards, the Jets would pull away as kicker Jay Feely booted a 47-yard field goal.

With the win, the Jets improved to 5–6.

=== Week 13: at Buffalo Bills ===
Quarter	1	2	3	4	Total
Jets	3	13	0	3	19
Bills	3	7	0	3	13

at Rogers Centre, Toronto, Ontario

- Game time: 8:20 pm EST
- Game weather: None (Closed roof)
- Game attendance: 51,567
- Referee: Scott Green
- TV announcers (NFLN): Bob Papa & Matt Millen

Game information

First quarter

- BUF – Rian Lindell 49-yard field goal, 10:45. Bills 3–0. Drive: 7 plays, 52 yards, 4:15.
- NYJ – Jay Feely 38-yard field goal, 3:39. Tied 3–3. Drive: 8 plays, 57 yards, 3:46.

Second quarter

- NYJ – Jay Feely 49-yard field goal, 13:21. Jets 6–3. Drive: 4 plays, 6 yards, 1:25.
- BUF – Marshawn Lynch 15-yard run (Rian Lindell kick), 10:25. Bills 10–6. Drive: 5 plays, 64 yards, 2:56.
- NYJ – Jay Feely 31-yard field goal, 6:09. Bills 10–9. Drive: 10 plays, 59 yards, 4:16.
- NYJ – Braylon Edwards 13-yard pass from Mark Sanchez (Jay Feely kick), 0:44. Jets 16–10. Drive: 6 plays, 85 yards, 2:58.

Third quarter

- No scoring plays

Fourth quarter

- NYJ – Jay Feely 37-yard field goal, 14:56. Jets 19–10. Drive: 8 plays, 34 yards, 4:51.
- BUF – Rian Lindell 32-yard field goal, 5:28. Jets 19–13. Drive: 8 plays, 36 yards, 3:39.

Top passers

- NYJ – Mark Sanchez – 7/15, 104 yards, TD
- BUF – Ryan Fitzpatrick – 9/23, 98 yards, INT

Top rushers

- NYJ – Thomas Jones – 23 rushes, 109 yards
- BUF – Marshawn Lynch – 6 rushes, 60 yards, TD

Top receivers

- NYJ – Jerricho Cotchery – 4 receptions, 68 yards
- BUF – Lee Evans – 1 receptions, 38 yards

Thomas Jones and Shonn Greene combined for 168 yards rushing, as the Jets compiled 249 total yards on the ground to top the Buffalo Bills, 19–13, at Rogers Centre. Mark Sanchez passed for 104 yards and a score on 7-of-15 passing before injuring his right knee on a head- first dive in the third quarter. Braylon Edwards had three catches for 45 yards and a score, while Jerricho Cotchery had four receptions for 68 yards in the win. Ryan Fitzpatrick struggled to complete passes, throwing for just 98 yards and an interception on 9-of-23 efficiency for the Bills, who have lost four of five to effectively end any slim playoff hopes the team had. Marshawn Lynch ran six times for 60 yards and a touchdown, while Fred Jackson had 13 rushes for 31 yards.

With the win, the Jets improved to 6–6.

=== Week 14: at Tampa Bay Buccaneers ===
Quarter	1	2	3	4	Total
Jets	6	13	0	7	26
Buccaneers	0	0	3	0	3

at Raymond James Stadium, Tampa, Florida

- Game time: 1:00 pm EST
- Game weather: 73 °F or 22.8 °C (Sunny)
- Game attendance: 62,731
- Referee: Carl Cheffers
- TV announcers (CBS): Ian Eagle & Rich Gannon

Game information

First quarter

- NYJ – Jay Feely 40-yard field goal, 12:40. Jets 3–0. Drive: 4 plays, 9 yards, 2:05.
- NYJ – Jay Feely 24-yard field goal, 4:47. Jets 6–0. Drive: 14 plays, 58 yards, 6:26.

Second quarter

- NYJ – Jay Feely 49-yard field goal, 6:53. Jets 9–0. Drive: 7 plays, 22 yards, 3:50.
- NYJ – Thomas Jones 33-yard run (Jay Feely kick), 3:19. Jets 16–0. Drive: 4 plays, 58 yards, 1:51.
- NYJ – Jay Feely 49-yard field goal, 0:11. Jets 19–0. Drive: 9 plays, 31 yards, 0:57.

Third quarter

- TB – Connor Barth 43-yard field goal, 4:45. Jets 19–3. Drive: 11 plays, 28 yards, 5:51.

Fourth quarter

- NYJ – Thomas Jones 7-yard run (Jay Feely kick), 9:07. Jets 26–3. Drive: 1 play, 7 yards, 0:07.

Top passers

- NYJ – Kellen Clemens – 12/23, 111 yards
- TB – Josh Freeman – 14/33, 93 yards, 3 INT

Top rushers

- NYJ – Thomas Jones – 23 rushes, 99 yards, 2 TD
- TB – Josh Freeman – 4 rushes, 21 yards

Top receivers

- NYJ – Braylon Edwards – 3 receptions, 37 yards
- TB – Kellen Winslow II – 4 receptions, 26 yards

The Jets would blow out the Buccaneers and improve to 7-6 getting right in the thick of the playoff race.

=== Week 15: vs. Atlanta Falcons ===
Quarter	1	2	3	4	Total
Falcons	3	0	0	7	10
Jets	7	0	0	0	7

at Giants Stadium, East Rutherford, New Jersey

- Game time: 1:00 pm EST
- Game weather: 29 °F or −1.7 °C (Clear)
- Game attendance: 76,866
- Referee: Ron Winter
- TV announcers (Fox): Dick Stockton & Charles Davis

Game information

First quarter

- ATL – Matt Bryant 24-yard field goal, 6:36. Falcons 3–0. Drive: 10 plays, 29 yards, 4:40.
- NYJ – Braylon Edwards 65-yard pass from Mark Sanchez (Jay Feely kick), 2:48. Jets 7–3. Drive: 1 play, 65 yards, 0:09.

Second quarter

- No scoring plays

Third quarter

- No scoring plays

Fourth quarter

- ATL – Tony Gonzalez 8-yard pass from Matt Ryan (Matt Bryant kick), 1:38. Falcons 10–7. Drive: 11 plays, 57 yards, 2:49.

Top passers

- ATL – Matt Ryan – 16/34, 152 yards, TD
- NYJ – Mark Sanchez – 18/32, 226 yards, TD, 3 INT

Top rushers

- ATL – Jason Snelling – 16 rushes, 59 yards
- NYJ – Thomas Jones – 19 rushes, 52 yards

Top receivers

- ATL – Jerious Norwood – 2 receptions, 47 yards
- NYJ – Braylon Edwards – 5 receptions, 105 yards, TD

The Jets had a 7–3 lead from the end of the 1st quarter to the middle of the 4th quarter until Matt Ryan connected with Tony Gonzalez giving the Falcons a 10–7 lead that would seal the game. With the loss, the Jets fell to 7-7 needing to win their last two game in order to be even considered a playoff contender.

=== Week 16: at Indianapolis Colts ===
Quarter	1	2	3	4	Total
Jets	0	3	15	11	29
Colts	6	3	6	0	15

at Lucas Oil Stadium, Indianapolis, Indiana

- Game time: 4:15 pm EST
- Game weather: None (Roof Closed)
- Game attendance: 67,222
- Referee: Terry McAulay
- TV announcers (CBS): Greg Gumbel and Dan Dierdorf

Game information

First quarter

- IND – Joseph Addai 21-yard run (kick failed), 6:55. Colts 6–0. Drive: 9 plays, 54 yards, 4:20.

Second quarter

- IND – Adam Vinatieri 22-yard field goal, 11:46. Colts 9–0. Drive: 10 plays, 86 yards, 4:45.
- NYJ – Jay Feely 35-yard field goal, 1:44. Colts 9–3. Drive: 11 plays, 63 yards, 4:38.

Third quarter

- NYJ – Brad Smith 106-yard kickoff return (Jay Feely kick), 14:48. Jets 10–9.
- IND – Donald Brown 1-yard run (run failed), 10:13. Colts 15–10. Drive: 9 plays, 81 yards, 4:35.
- NYJ – Marques Douglas 1-yard fumble return (Mark Sanchez pass to Dustin Keller), 1:29. Jets 18–15.

Fourth quarter

- NYJ – Jay Feely 43-yard field goal, 13:23. Jets 21–15. Drive: 6 plays, 20 yards, 2:03.
- NYJ – Thomas Jones 1-yard run (Mark Sanchez pass to Braylon Edwards), 5:38. Jets 29–15. Drive: 11 plays, 79 yards, 6:14.

Top passers

- NYJ – Mark Sanchez – 12/19, 106 yards
- IND – Peyton Manning – 14/21, 192 yards

Top rushers

- NYJ – Thomas Jones – 23 rushes, 105 yards, TD
- IND – Joseph Addai – 6 rushes, 40 yards, TD

Top receivers

- NYJ – Jerricho Cotchery – 4 receptions, 45 yards
- IND – Austin Collie – 6 receptions, 94 yards

With the win, the Jets ended the Colts' perfect season run, and also ended their 23–game regular season winning streak. The Jets were able to capitalize on the Colts' decision to bench quarterback Peyton Manning to avoid injury given they had already made the playoffs. The Jets improved their playoff chances greatly by moving to 8–7 on the season. Having beaten the 10–0 Titans the previous season, the Jets thus became the first NFL team to beat the final undefeated team in consecutive seasons since the 1960 and 1961 St. Louis Cardinals.

=== Week 17: vs. Cincinnati Bengals ===
Quarter	1	2	3	4	Total
Bengals	0	0	0	0	0
Jets	7	20	3	7	37

at Giants Stadium, East Rutherford, New Jersey

- Game time: 8:20 pm EST
- Game weather: 20 °F or −6.7 °C (Cloudy)
- Game attendance: 79,106
- Referee: Walt Anderson
- TV announcers (NBC): Al Michaels and Cris Collinsworth

Game information

First quarter

- NYJ – Thomas Jones 1-yard run (Jay Feely kick), 10:46. Jets 7–0. Drive: 7 plays, 72 yards, 4:14.

Second quarter

- NYJ – Jay Feely 20-yard field goal, 13:29. Jets 10–0. Drive: 21 plays, 74 yards, 11:11.
- NYJ – Brad Smith 32-yard run (Jay Feely kick), 6:37. Jets 17–0. Drive: 4 plays, 47 yards, 2:08.
- NYJ – Jerricho Cotchery 6-yard run (Jay Feely kick), 0:37. Jets 24–0. Drive: 10 plays, 60 yards, 5:01.
- NYJ – Jay Feely 39-yard field goal, 0:00. Jets 27–0. Drive: 3 plays, -6 yards, 0:20.

Third quarter

- NYJ – Jay Feely 40-yard field goal, 9:47. Jets 30–0. Drive: 7 plays, 18 yards, 2:55.

Fourth quarter

- NYJ – Thomas Jones 2-yard run (Jay Feely kick), 9:55. Jets 37–0. Drive: 9 plays, 24 yards, 4:52.

Top passers

- CIN – J. T. O'Sullivan – 3/8, 31 yards
- NYJ – Mark Sanchez – 8/16, 63 yards

Top rushers

- CIN – Larry Johnson – 9 rushes, 38 yards
- NYJ – Brad Smith – 4 rushes, 92 yards, TD

Top receivers

- CIN – Laveranues Coles – 3 receptions, 19 yards
- NYJ – Jerricho Cotchery – 5 receptions, 39 yards

The Jets would need to win the season finale to get in the playoffs. They did just that as they flew right past the Bengals 37–0 and they would meet in a rematch in Cincinnati for the Wild Card Round. The Jets would finish 9–7 this time however getting them a playoff berth unlike last year. This was also the last game played at Giants Stadium.

== Postseason ==
=== Schedule ===
Round	Date	Opponent (seed)	Result	Record	Venue	Recap
Wild Card	January 9, 2010	at Cincinnati Bengals (4)	W 24–14	1–0	Paul Brown Stadium	Recap
Divisional	January 17, 2010	at San Diego Chargers (2)	W 17–14	2–0	Qualcomm Stadium	Recap
AFC Championship	January 24, 2010	at Indianapolis Colts (1)	L 17–30	2–1	Lucas Oil Stadium	Recap

=== Game summaries ===
==== AFC Wild Card Playoffs: at (4) Cincinnati Bengals ====
AFC Wild Card Playoffs: (5) New York Jets at (4) Cincinnati Bengals – Game summary

Quarter	1	2	3	4	Total
Jets	0	14	7	3	24
Bengals	7	0	0	7	14

at Paul Brown Stadium, Cincinnati, Ohio

- Date: January 9, 2010
- Game time: 4:30 pm EST
- Game weather: Cloudy, 21 °F (−6 °C)
- Game attendance: 63,686
- Referee: Bill Leavy
- TV announcers (NBC): Tom Hammond, Joe Theismann & Joe Gibbs
- Game Book

Game information

First quarter

- CIN – Laveranues Coles 11-yard pass from Carson Palmer (Shayne Graham kick), 7:07. Bengals 7–0. Drive: 7 plays, 68 yards, 3:03.

Second quarter

- NYJ – Shonn Greene 39-yard run (Jay Feely kick), 11:52. Tied 7–7. Drive: 2 plays, 47 yards, 0:49.
- NYJ – Dustin Keller 45-yard pass from Mark Sanchez (Jay Feely kick), 6:19. Jets 14–7. Drive: 4 plays, 57 yards, 2:07.

Third quarter

- NYJ – Thomas Jones 9-yard run (Jay Feely kick), 2:18. Jets 21–7. Drive: 8 plays, 60 yards, 4:06.

Fourth quarter

- CIN – Cedric Benson 47-yard run (Shayne Graham kick), 11:04. Jets 21–14. Drive: 2 plays, 56 yards, 0:52.
- NYJ – Jay Feely 20-yard field goal, 5:47. Jets 24–14. Drive: 8 plays, 66 yards, 5:17.

Top passers

- NYJ – Mark Sanchez – 12/15, 182 yards, TD
- CIN – Carson Palmer – 18/36, 146 yards, TD, INT

Top rushers

- NYJ – Shonn Greene – 21 rushes, 135 yards, TD
- CIN – Cedric Benson – 21 rushes, 169 yards, TD

Top receivers

- NYJ – Dustin Keller – 3 receptions, 99 yards, TD
- CIN – Laveranues Coles – 6 receptions, 48 yards, TD

Entering the playoffs as the AFC's No. 5 seed, the Jets began their playoff run at Paul Brown Stadium in the AFC Wild Card game against the No. 4 Cincinnati Bengals, in a rematch of their dominating Week 17 game.

The Jets would trail in the first quarter as Bengals quarterback Carson Palmer completed an 11-yard touchdown pass to former Jets wide receiver Laveranues Coles, but responded in the second quarter with a 39-yard touchdown run from rookie running back Shonn Greene, followed by rookie quarterback Mark Sanchez hooking up with tight end Dustin Keller on a 45-yard touchdown pass.

The Jets would add onto their lead in the third quarter with a 9-yard touchdown run from running back Thomas Jones. Cincinnati would begin to rally in the fourth quarter as running back Cedric Benson got a 47-yard touchdown run, but the Jets came right back as kicker Jay Feely nailed a 20-yard field goal.

With the win, not only did the Jets improve their overall record to 10–7, but rookie quarterback Mark Sanchez and rookie head coach Rex Ryan picked up their first postseason win.

==== AFC Divisional Playoffs: at (2) San Diego Chargers ====
AFC Divisional Playoffs: (5) New York Jets at (2) San Diego Chargers – Game summary

Quarter	1	2	3	4	Total
Jets	0	0	3	14	17
Chargers	0	7	0	7	14

at Qualcomm Stadium, San Diego, California

- Date: January 17, 2010
- Game time: 4:40 pm EST
- Game weather: Sunny, 63 °F (17 °C)
- Game attendance: 69,498
- Referee: Jerome Boger
- TV announcers (CBS): Jim Nantz & Phil Simms
- Game Book

Game information

First quarter

- No scoring plays

Second quarter

- SD – Kris Wilson 13-yard pass from Philip Rivers (Nate Kaeding kick), 12:17. Chargers 7–0. Drive: 4 plays, 39 yards, 1:56.

Third quarter

- NYJ – Jay Feely 46-yard field goal, 10:45. Chargers 7–3. Drive: 8 plays, 32 yards, 4:15.

Fourth quarter

- NYJ – Dustin Keller 2-yard pass from Mark Sanchez (Jay Feely kick), 13:35. Jets 10–7. Drive: 4 plays, 14 yards, 1:27.
- NYJ – Shonn Greene 53-yard run (Jay Feely kick), 7:17. Jets 17–7. Drive: 4 plays, 66 yards, 2:10.
- SD – Philip Rivers 1-yard run (Nate Kaeding kick), 2:14. Jets 17–14. Drive: 7 plays, 78 yards, 1:22.

Top passers

- NYJ – Mark Sanchez – 12/23, 100 yards, TD, INT
- SD – Philip Rivers – 27/40, 298 yards, TD, 2 INT

Top rushers

- NYJ – Shonn Greene – 23 rushes, 128 yards, TD
- SD – Darren Sproles – 3 rushes, 33 yards

Top receivers

- NYJ – Braylon Edwards – 2 receptions, 41 yards
- SD – Vincent Jackson – 7 receptions, 111 yards

Coming off their impressive road win over the Bengals, the Jets flew to Qualcomm Stadium for the AFC Divisional Round against the No. 2 San Diego Chargers. After a scoreless first quarter, the Jets would trail in the second quarter as Chargers quarterback Philip Rivers completed a 13-yard touchdown pass to fullback Kris Wilson. The Jets would answer in the third quarter with kicker Jay Feely making a 46-yard field goal, and then take the lead in the fourth quarter as rookie quarterback Mark Sanchez completed a 2-yard touchdown to tight end Dustin Keller, followed by rookie running back Shonn Greene busting for a 53-yard touchdown run. San Diego tried to rally as quarterback Philip Rivers ran in for a 1-yard touchdown run, yet the Jets recovered the onside kick for the win.

With the win, not only did the Jets improve their overall record to 11–7, but they advanced to their first AFC Championship Game since 1998. They also won consecutive playoff games for the first time since 1982.

Sanchez (12 of 23 for 100 yards with 1 TD and 1 INT) would join Ravens' quarterback Joe Flacco as the only rookie quarterbacks in NFL history to win two playoff games.

==== AFC Championship: at (1) Indianapolis Colts ====
AFC Championship: (5) New York Jets at (1) Indianapolis Colts – Game summary

Quarter	1	2	3	4	Total
Jets	0	17	0	0	17
Colts	0	13	7	10	30

at Lucas Oil Stadium, Indianapolis, Indiana

- Date: January 24, 2010
- Game time: 3:00 pm EST
- Game weather: None (retractable roof closed)
- Game attendance: 67,650
- Referee: Tony Corrente
- TV announcers (CBS): Jim Nantz & Phil Simms
- Game Book

Game information

First quarter

- No scoring plays

Second quarter

- IND – Matt Stover 25-yard field goal, 14:56. Colts 3–0. Drive: 8 plays, 82 yards, 3:41.
- NYJ – Braylon Edwards 80-yard pass from Mark Sanchez (Jay Feely kick), 14:45. Jets 7–3. Drive: 1 play, 80 yards, 0:11.
- IND – Matt Stover 19-yard field goal, 8:44. Jets 7–6. Drive: 12 plays, 79 yards, 6:01.
- NYJ – Dustin Keller 9-yard pass from Mark Sanchez (Jay Feely kick), 4:53. Jets 14–6. Drive: 7 plays, 77 yards, 3:51.
- NYJ – Jay Feely 48-yard field goal, 2:11. Jets 17–6. Drive: 4 plays, -1 yards, 1:29.
- IND – Austin Collie 16-yard pass from Peyton Manning (Matt Stover kick), 1:13. Jets 17–13. Drive: 4 plays, 80 yards, 0:58.

Third quarter

- IND – Pierre Garcon 4-yard pass from Peyton Manning (Matt Stover kick), 8:03. Colts 20–17. Drive: 8 plays, 57 yards, 3:31.

Fourth quarter

- IND – Dallas Clark 15-yard pass from Peyton Manning (Matt Stover kick), 8:52. Colts 27–17. Drive: 7 plays, 51 yards, 3:33.
- IND – Matt Stover 21-yard field goal, 2:29. Colts 30–17. Drive: 12 plays, 71 yards, 5:33.

Top passers

- NYJ – Mark Sanchez – 17/30, 257 yards, 2 TD, INT
- IND – Peyton Manning – 26/39, 377 yards, 3 TD

Top rushers

- NYJ – Thomas Jones – 16 rushes, 42 yards
- IND – Joseph Addai – 16 rushes, 80 yards

Top receivers

- NYJ – Jerricho Cotchery – 5 receptions, 102 yards
- IND – Pierre Garcon – 11 receptions, 151 yards, TD

Coming off their divisional road win over the Chargers, the Jets flew to Lucas Oil Stadium for the AFC Championship Game against the top-seeded Indianapolis Colts. After a scoreless first quarter, the Jets would trail to begin the second quarter as Colts kicker Matt Stover made a 25-yard field goal. The Jets would immediately respond as rookie quarterback Mark Sanchez hooked up with wide receiver Braylon Edwards on an 80-yard touchdown pass. Indianapolis would chip away at New York's lead as Stover got a 19-yard field goal, yet the Jets struck again with Sanchez finding tight end Dustin Keller on a 9-yard touchdown pass, followed by kicker Jay Feely's 48-yard field goal. However, the Colts continued their assault as quarterback Peyton Manning completed a 9-yard touchdown pass to wide receiver Austin Collie.

Indianapolis would take the lead in the third quarter with Manning completing a 4-yard touchdown pass to wide receiver Pierre Garçon, followed by Manning's 15-yard touchdown pass to tight end Dallas Clark in the fourth quarter. Afterwards, the Colts would pull away as Stover booted a 21-yard field goal.

With the loss, New York's season would come to an end with an overall record of 11–8. The Jets failed to go to the Super Bowl and their wait for their second appearance and first since 1968 continues as of 2025.
