= Donald Strickland =

American football player (born 1980)

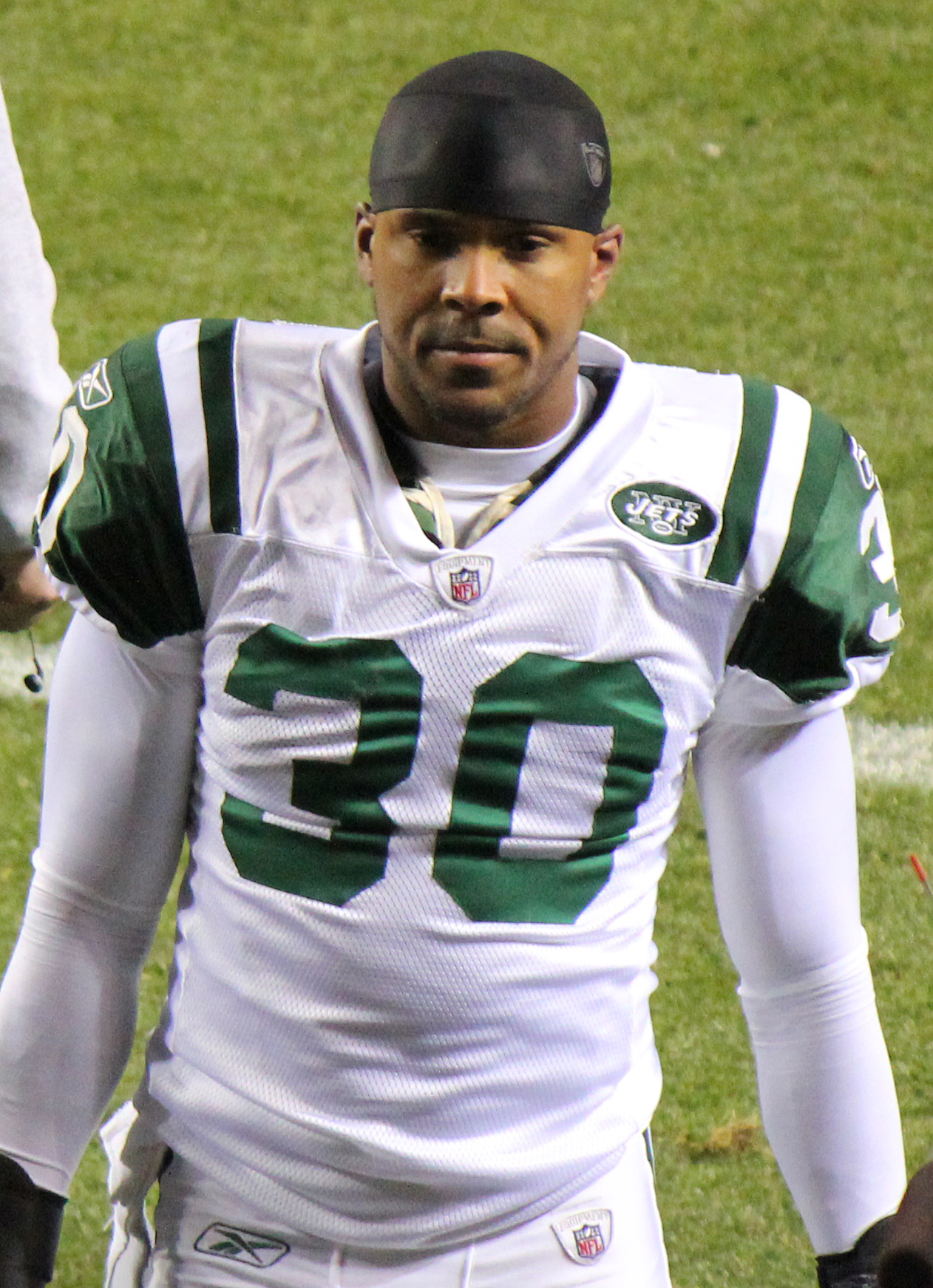
- Strickland with the New York Jets in 2011

No. 30, 33, 27
- Position: Cornerback

Personal information
- Born: November 24, 1980 (age 45); San Francisco, California, U.S.
- Listed height: 5 ft 10 in (1.78 m)
- Listed weight: 185 lb (84 kg)

Career information
- High school: Archbishop Riordan (San Francisco)
- College: Colorado
- NFL draft: 2003: 3rd round, 90th overall pick

Career history
- Indianapolis Colts (2003–2005); Philadelphia Eagles (2005); San Francisco 49ers (2006–2008); New York Jets (2009); San Diego Chargers (2010); New York Jets (2011)

Awards and highlights
- Second-team All-Big 12 (2002)

Career NFL statistics
- Total tackles: 263
- Sacks: 4
- Forced fumbles: 5
- Pass deflections: 24
- Interceptions: 2
- Stats at Pro Football Reference

Donald Darell Strickland (born November 24, 1980) is an American former professional football player who was a cornerback in the National Football League (NFL). He was selected by the Indianapolis Colts in the third round of the 2003 NFL draft. He played college football for the Colorado Buffaloes.

Strickland has also played for the Philadelphia Eagles, San Francisco 49ers, San Diego Chargers, and New York Jets.

== Early life ==
Strickland attended Archbishop Riordan High School in San Francisco, California. As a senior at Riordan, Strickland was a standout All-League running back. His uncle, Raymond Bell, played at UCLA and his cousin, Herb Ward, played at Southern California and in the NFL with the Dallas Cowboys. Strickland's father, Donald, is a retired photographer for the NBC affiliate, KRON-4 in the Bay Area.

== College career ==
Strickland attended the University of Colorado. Strickland was a key part in the Buffaloes' run to a Big 12 Conference Championship in 2001. He had 78 tackles and two interceptions, both returned for touchdowns. In 2002, he had 86 tackles, and one interception returned 95 yards for a touchdown.

== Professional career ==
Pre-draft measurables
Height	Weight	Arm length	Hand span	40-yard dash	10-yard split	20-yard split	20-yard shuttle	Three-cone drill	Vertical jump	Broad jump	Bench press
5 ft 10 in (1.78 m)	187 lb (85 kg)	30 1/8 in (0.77 m)	9 1/4 in (0.23 m)	4.53 s	1.57 s	2.63 s	4.04 s	6.98 s	35.5 in (0.90 m)	10 ft 1 in (3.07 m)	16 reps
All values from NFL Combine.

=== Indianapolis Colts ===
Strickland started for the Indianapolis Colts from 2003 until the first game of 2005 when he injured himself.

=== Philadelphia Eagles ===
He was picked up by the Philadelphia Eagles later that season, playing in three games. The Eagles waived Strickland during the 2006 training camp.

=== San Francisco 49ers ===
The San Francisco 49ers acquired him as a free agent on October 31, 2006. The 49ers released Strickland on February 26, 2007, but re-signed him on March 6, 2007, to a one-year deal. He re-signed with the 49ers on March 21, 2008, to a one-year contract.

=== New York Jets (first stint) ===
An unrestricted free agent in the 2009 offseason, Strickland signed with the New York Jets on March 25. He was released on March 5, 2010.

=== San Diego Chargers ===
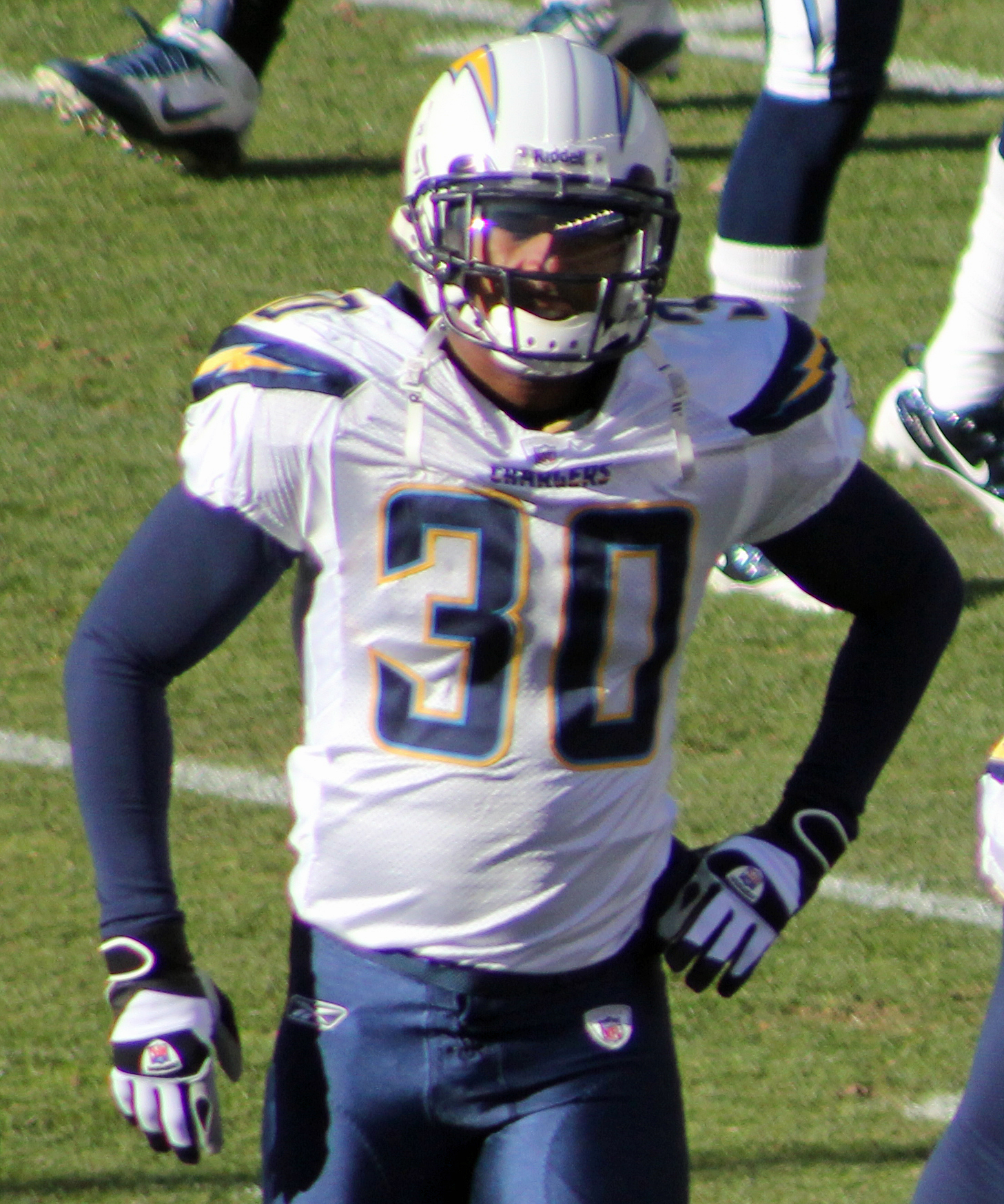
Strickland with the Chargers in 2010

Strickland signed with the San Diego Chargers on March 12, 2010. After one season in San Diego, he was released on July 28, 2011.

=== New York Jets (second stint) ===
On July 30, 2011, Strickland was re-signed by the Jets.

== NFL career statistics ==
Legend
**Bold**	Career high

=== Regular season ===
Year	Team	Games		Tackles					Interceptions					Fumbles			
Year	Team	GP	GS	Cmb	Solo	Ast	Sck	TFL	Int	Yds	TD	Lng	PD	FF	FR	Yds	TD
2003	IND	11	**8**	**48**	33	**15**	0.0	0	**2**	**43**	0	**24**	3	**1**	0	0	0
2004	IND	4	4	20	15	5	0.0	0	0	0	0	0	0	0	0	0	0
2005	IND	1	0	7	6	1	0.0	0	0	0	0	0	3	0	0	0	0
2005	PHI	3	0	13	11	2	0.0	0	0	0	0	0	0	**1**	0	0	0
2006	SFO	3	3	4	3	1	0.0	0	0	0	0	0	0	0	0	0	0
2007	SFO	13	4	45	33	12	0.0	1	0	0	0	0	**5**	0	0	0	0
2008	SFO	14	3	38	28	10	0.0	0	0	0	0	0	**5**	**1**	0	0	0
2009	NYJ	9	2	26	22	4	**2.0**	**2**	0	0	0	0	2	**1**	0	0	0
2010	SDG	**16**	0	23	19	4	1.0	1	0	0	0	0	2	**1**	0	0	0
2011	NYJ	15	1	39	**34**	5	1.0	1	0	0	0	0	4	0	0	0	0
		89	25	263	204	59	4.0	5	2	43	0	24	24	5	0	0	0

=== Playoffs ===
Year	Team	Games		Tackles					Interceptions					Fumbles			
Year	Team	GP	GS	Cmb	Solo	Ast	Sck	TFL	Int	Yds	TD	Lng	PD	FF	FR	Yds	TD
2003	IND	**3**	**3**	**18**	**15**	**3**	0.0	0	0	0	0	0	0	0	0	0	0
2009	NYJ	2	1	6	6	0	0.0	0	0	0	0	0	**2**	0	0	0	0
		5	4	24	21	3	0.0	0	0	0	0	0	2	0	0	0	0
