= Chansi Stuckey =

American football player and coach (born 1983)

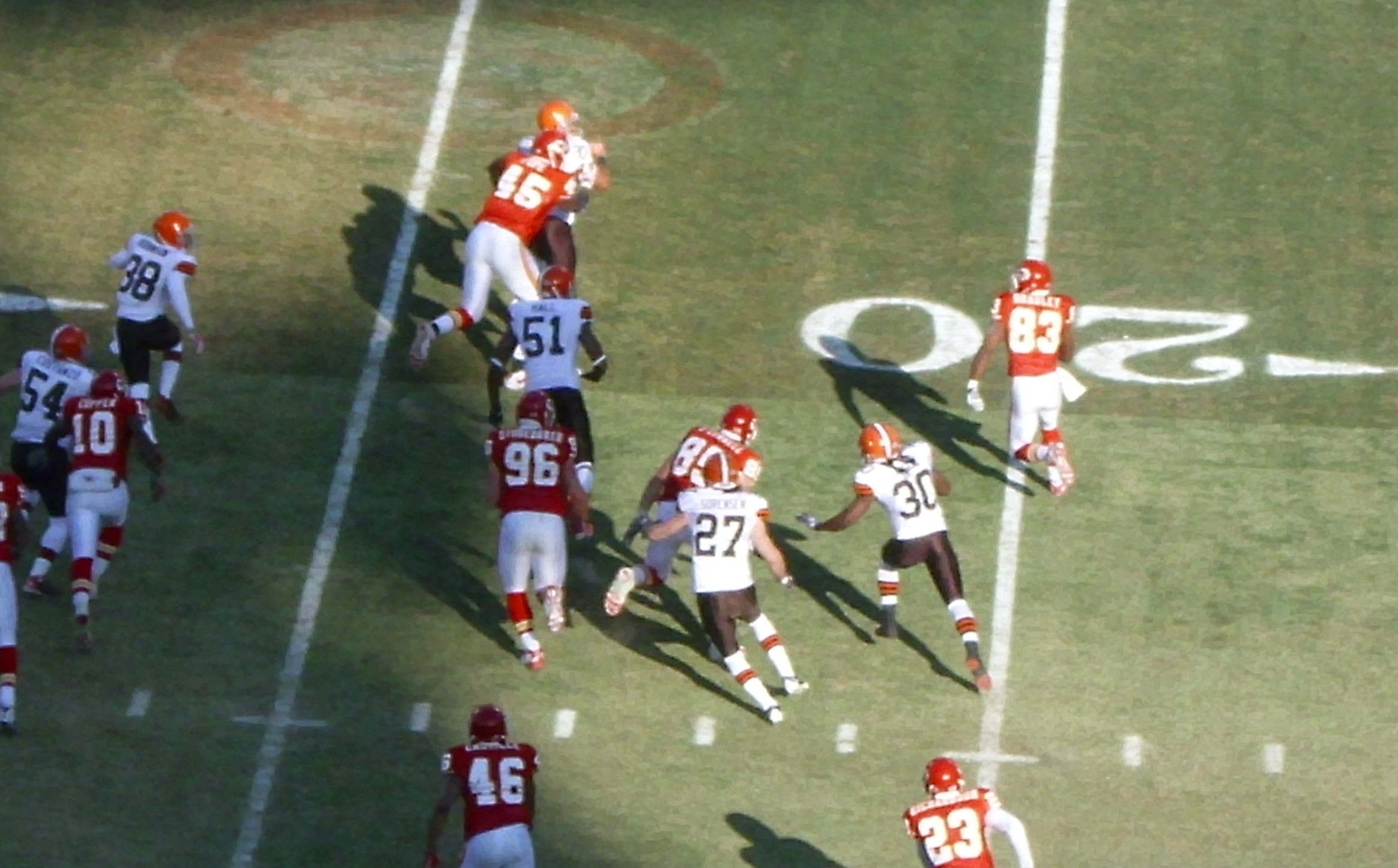
- Stuckey (No. 88, left) during a game

Marshall Thundering Herd
- Title: Wide receivers coach

Personal information
- Born: October 4, 1983 (age 43); Warner Robins, Georgia, U.S.
- Listed height: 5 ft 10 in (1.78 m)
- Listed weight: 196 lb (89 kg)

Career information
- High school: Northside (Warner Robins)
- College: Clemson
- NFL draft: 2007: 7th round, 235th overall pick

Career history

Playing
- New York Jets (2007–2009); Cleveland Browns (2009–2010); Arizona Cardinals (2011); Toronto Argonauts (2012)*
- * Offseason or practice squad member only

Coaching
- Clemson (2019) Graduate assistant; Clemson (2020) Offensive player development; Baylor (2021) Wide receivers coach; Notre Dame (2022–2023) Wide receivers coach; Marshall (2025–present) Wide receivers coach

Awards and highlights
- 2× First-team All-ACC (2005, 2006)

Career NFL statistics
- Receptions: 106
- Receiving yards: 1,062
- Receiving touchdowns: 5
- Stats at Pro Football Reference

Chansi V. Stuckey (born October 4, 1983) is an American former professional football player who was a wide receiver in the National Football League (NFL). He was selected by the New York Jets in the seventh round of the 2007 NFL draft. He played college football for the Clemson Tigers. Stuckey also played for the Cleveland Browns and the Arizona Cardinals. He then served as wide receivers coach at Baylor and Notre Dame.

== Professional career ==
=== New York Jets ===
Stuckey was selected in the seventh round (235th overall) of the 2007 NFL draft by the New York Jets. After a promising preseason performance with 11 receptions, he sat out the entire 2007 regular season due to a broken foot. He started at the wide receiver position for the Jets in 2008. In each of the Jets' first three games, he caught touchdown passes from quarterback Brett Favre. Stuckey also caught Mark Sanchez's first career NFL touchdown against the Houston Texans in Week 1 of the 2009 NFL season.

=== Cleveland Browns ===
On October 7, 2009, Stuckey was traded to the Cleveland Browns, along with Jason Trusnik, and third and fifth round draft picks in the 2010 NFL draft. The Jets received Braylon Edwards.

=== Arizona Cardinals ===
Stuckey was signed by the Arizona Cardinals on July 29, 2011. He was released on March 16, 2012.

=== Toronto Argonauts ===
On October 17, 2012, Stuckey was signed by the Toronto Argonauts of the Canadian Football League. He was released by the team on November 10, 2012.

== Coaching career ==
After his playing career ended, Stuckey was named a video graduate assistant at his alma mater Clemson in 2019. He was promoted to an offensive player development coach in 2020.

Stuckey was named the wide receivers coach at Baylor on January 5, 2021.

Stuckey was named the wide receivers coach at Notre Dame on January 12, 2022.

In January 2025, Stuckey was hired as the wide receivers coach at Marshall under first-year head coach, Tony Gibson.
