= David Clowney =

American gridiron football player (born 1985)

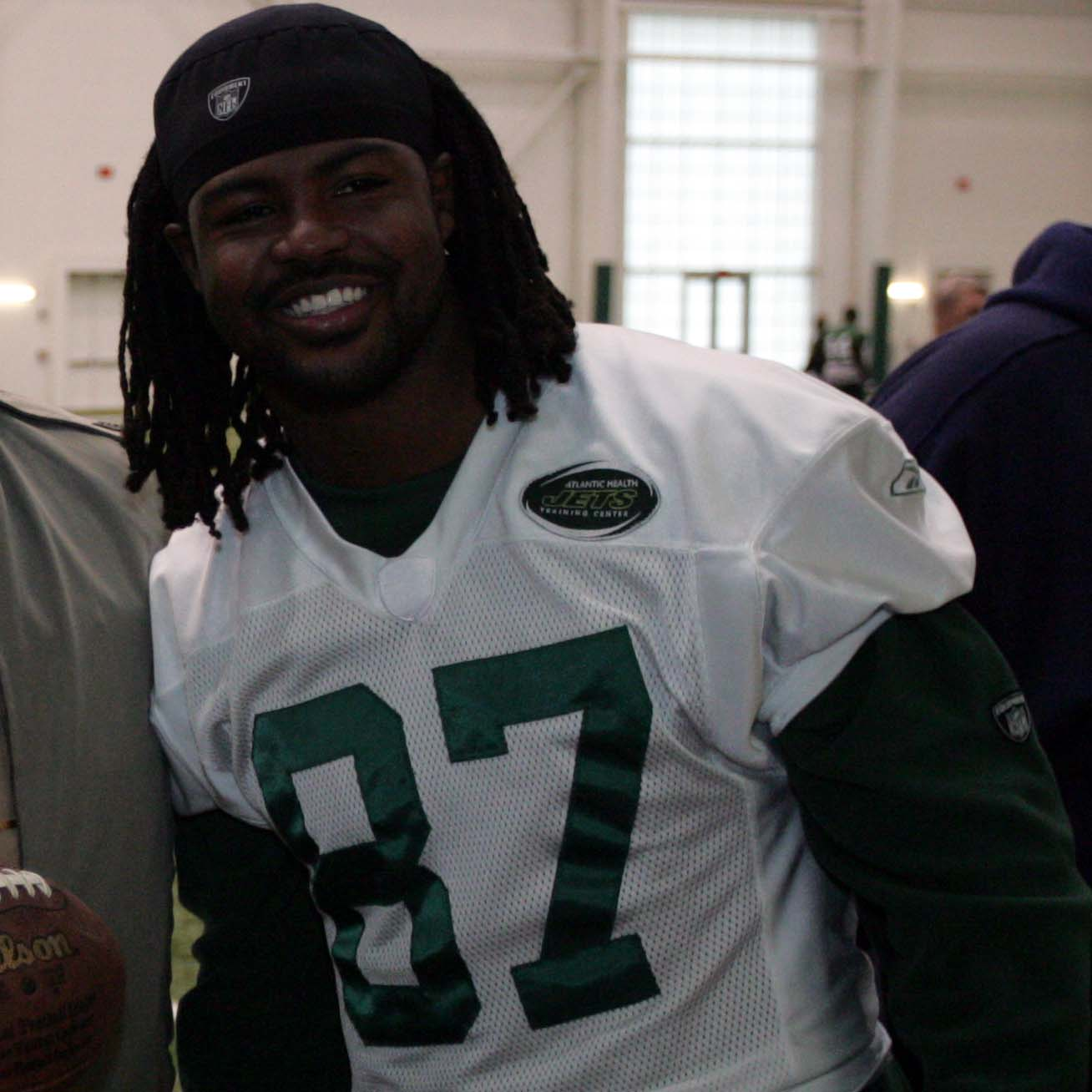
- Clowney while with the New York Jets in 2009

Coastal Carolina Chanticleers
- Title: Wide receivers coach

Personal information
- Born: July 8, 1985 (age 41); Amityville, New York, U.S.
- Listed height: 6 ft 1 in (1.85 m)
- Listed weight: 190 lb (86 kg)

Career information
- High school: Atlantic (Delray Beach, Florida)
- College: Virginia Tech
- NFL draft: 2007: 5th round, 157th overall pick

Career history

Playing
- Green Bay Packers (2007)*; New York Jets (2007–2010); Carolina Panthers (2010); Buffalo Bills (2012)*; Virginia Destroyers (2012); Montreal Alouettes (2013–2014)
- * Offseason or practice squad member only

Coaching
- ASA Miami (2015) Wide receivers coach & pass game coordinator; FIU (2016) Assistant wide receivers coach & offensive quality control; Howard (2017–2018) Co-offensive coordinator & wide receivers coach; New York Jets (2019–2020) Assistant wide receivers coach & offensive quality control; Stetson (2022) Wide receivers coach; Carolina Panthers (2023) Offensive assistant; Morehouse (2023) Quarterbacks coach; Missouri State (2024–2025) Wide receivers coach; Coastal Carolina (2026–present) Wide receivers coach

Career NFL statistics
- Receptions: 22
- Receiving yards: 341
- Receiving average: 15.5
- Receiving touchdowns: 1
- Stats at Pro Football Reference

David Cortez Clowney IV (born July 8, 1985) is an American former professional football player who was a wide receiver in the National Football League (NFL). He was selected by the Green Bay Packers in the fifth round of the 2007 NFL draft. He played college football for the Virginia Tech Hokies.

Clowney was also a member of the New York Jets, Carolina Panthers, Buffalo Bills, Virginia Destroyers, and Montreal Alouettes

== Early life ==
Clowney attended Atlantic Community High School in Delray Beach, Florida. While there, he was an honorable mention Class 5A All-State selection as a senior. He lettered four seasons as a receiver and safety. Clowney was named to the All-Palm Beach County team as published by the Palm Beach Post. He made one of the season's biggest plays, a 99-yard touchdown catch against Blanche Ely High School in the regional finals. Clowney totaled 25 catches for 576 yards and a county-best ten touchdowns. He returned three kicks for 245 yards and two touchdowns. Clowney caught three passes for 120 yards and two touchdowns in a game against Wellington High School. He caught 39 passes his junior season.

Clowney was also a sprinter on the track team. He was a state finalist in the 200 meter dash and a regional finalist in the 100 meter dash. He also lettered two years as a guard in basketball.

== College career ==
Clowney attended Virginia Tech, where he played college football for four seasons. Over his career, he recorded 93 receptions for 1,373 yards and 6 touchdowns; he also had five kick returns for 119 yards.

== Professional career ==
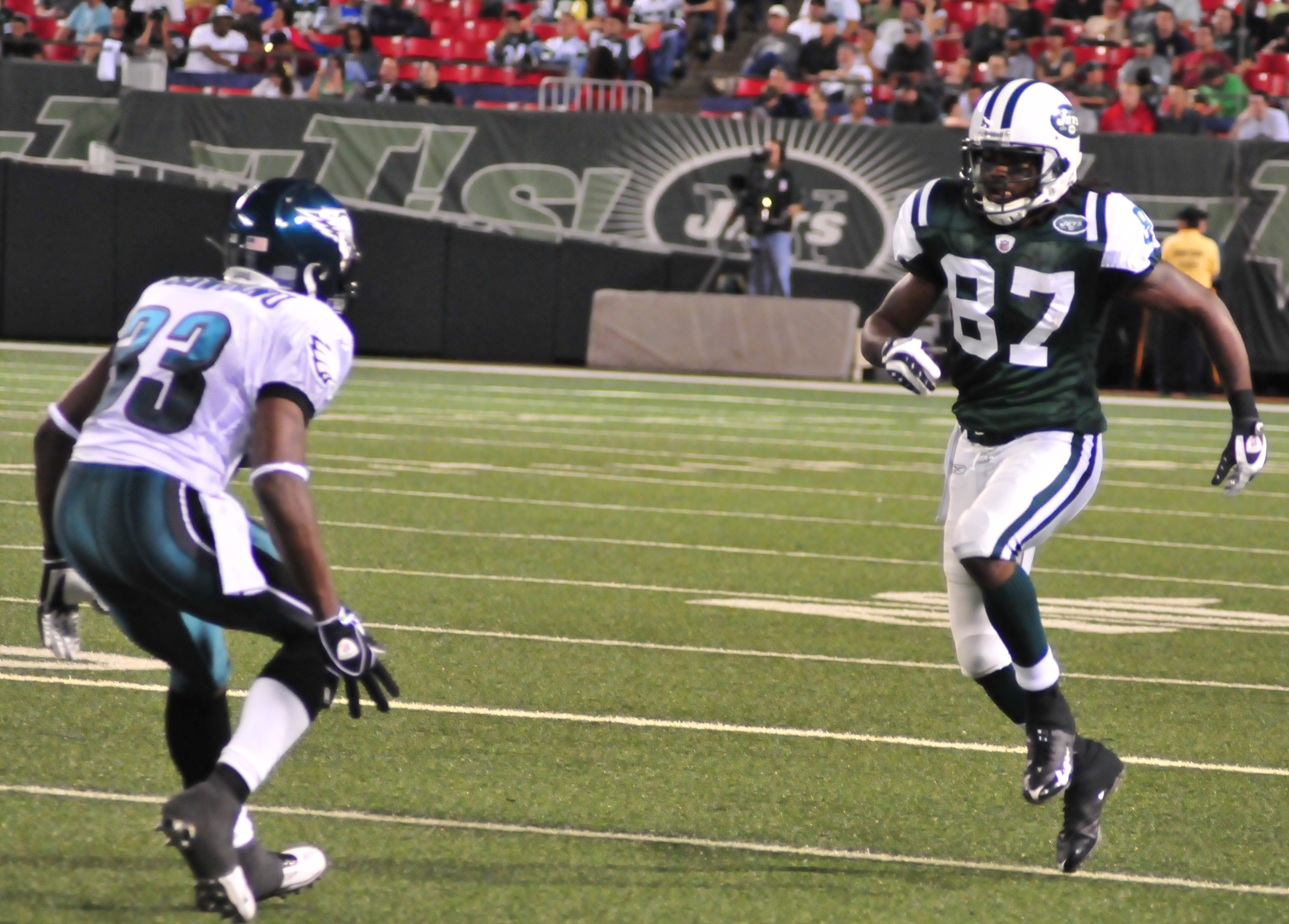
Clowney (right) with the New York Jets in 2009

=== Green Bay Packers ===
Clowney was selected in the fifth round (157th overall) of the 2007 NFL draft by the Green Bay Packers.

=== New York Jets ===
Clowney was signed by the New York Jets on October 3, 2007. In a 2008 preseason game Clowney led all receivers with four receptions for 163 yards and two touchdowns. He finished preseason catching eight passes for 222 yards and two touchdowns. However, Clowney injured his collar bone, and didn't have his first career NFL reception until Week 15 against the Buffalo Bills, when he had a one-handed catch that went for 26 yards from Brett Favre

In 2009, Clowney caught 14 passes for 191 yards. He had 1 touchdown catch.

The Jets waived Clowney on September 5, 2010. Clowney was immediately re-signed by the team on September 14, 2010, following their Week One matchup against the Baltimore Ravens. Clowney, along with teammate Patrick Turner, were released on October 4, 2010, to make room for defensive tackle Howard Green and wide receiver Santonio Holmes, who was returning from a four-game suspension.

=== Carolina Panthers ===
Clowney was claimed off waivers by the Carolina Panthers on October 5, 2010. Where he started the next 4 games with Steve Smith being injured.

=== Buffalo Bills ===
On January 5, 2012, Clowney signed a reserve/futures contract with the Buffalo Bills.

=== Montreal Alouettes ===
Clowney was signed by Montreal Alouettes of the (CFL) Canadian Football League. He suffered a neck injury on June 13, 2013, at a pre-season game against Hamilton Tiger Cats and was placed on 9 game injured reserve list.

=== NFL statistics ===
Regular season			Receiving					
Year	Team	G	Rec	Yds	Avg	Yds/G	Lng	TD
2007	GB / NYJ*	0	0	0	0.0	0	0	0
2008	NYJ	2	1	26	26.0	13.0	26	0
2009	NYJ	13	14	191	13.6	14.7	53	1
Total		15	15	217	14.5	14.5	53	1
