= Jason Trusnik =

American football player (born 1984)

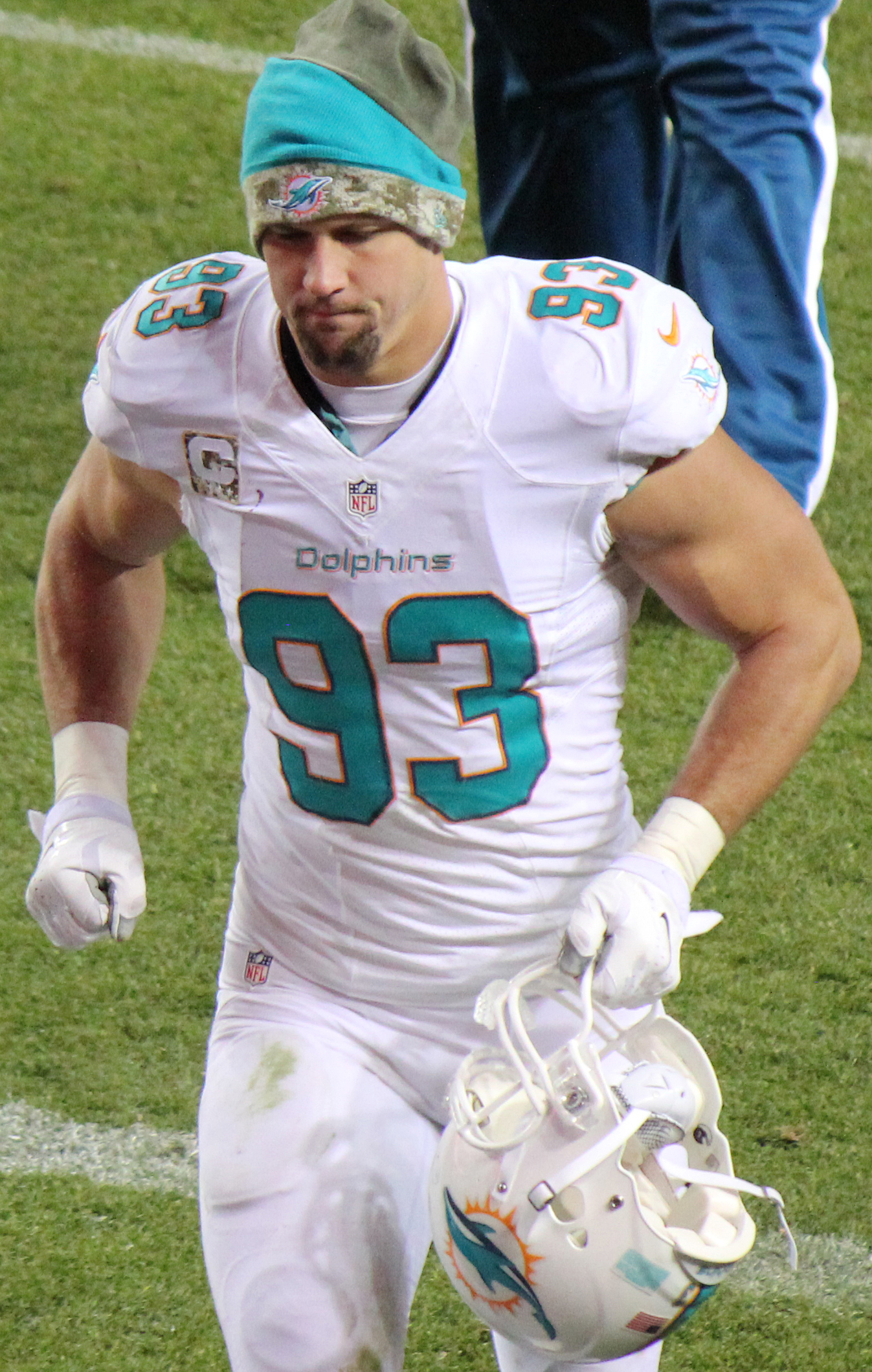
- Trusnik with the Miami Dolphins in 2014

No. 57, 96, 93, 59
- Position: Linebacker

Personal information
- Born: June 6, 1984 (age 42); Cleveland, Ohio, U.S.
- Listed height: 6 ft 4 in (1.93 m)
- Listed weight: 241 lb (109 kg)

Career information
- High school: Nordonia (Macedonia, Ohio)
- College: Ohio Northern
- NFL draft: 2007: undrafted

Career history
- New York Jets (2007–2009); Cleveland Browns (2009–2010); Miami Dolphins (2011–2014); Carolina Panthers (2015)*; Minnesota Vikings (2015); New Orleans Saints (2016)
- * Offseason or practice squad member only

Awards and highlights
- 2× Division III All-American (2006); 2× All-OAC (2005, 2006)

Career NFL statistics
- Total tackles: 232
- Sacks: 3.5
- Forced fumbles: 2
- Fumble recoveries: 4
- Interceptions: 1
- Stats at Pro Football Reference

Jason Trusnik (/ˈtrʌznɪk/ TRUZZ-nik; born June 6, 1984) is an American former professional football player who was a linebacker and special teamer in the National Football League (NFL). He played college football for the Ohio Northern Polar Bears before being signed by the New York Jets as an undrafted free agent in 2007.

== College career ==
Trusnik played college football at Ohio Northern. He was twice named a Division III All-American and twice named All-Ohio Athletic Conference. Additionally, he played in the Texas vs. The Nation Game for 'The Nation' team and was named a co-captain for Team United States in the Aztec Bowl.

== Professional career ==
=== New York Jets ===
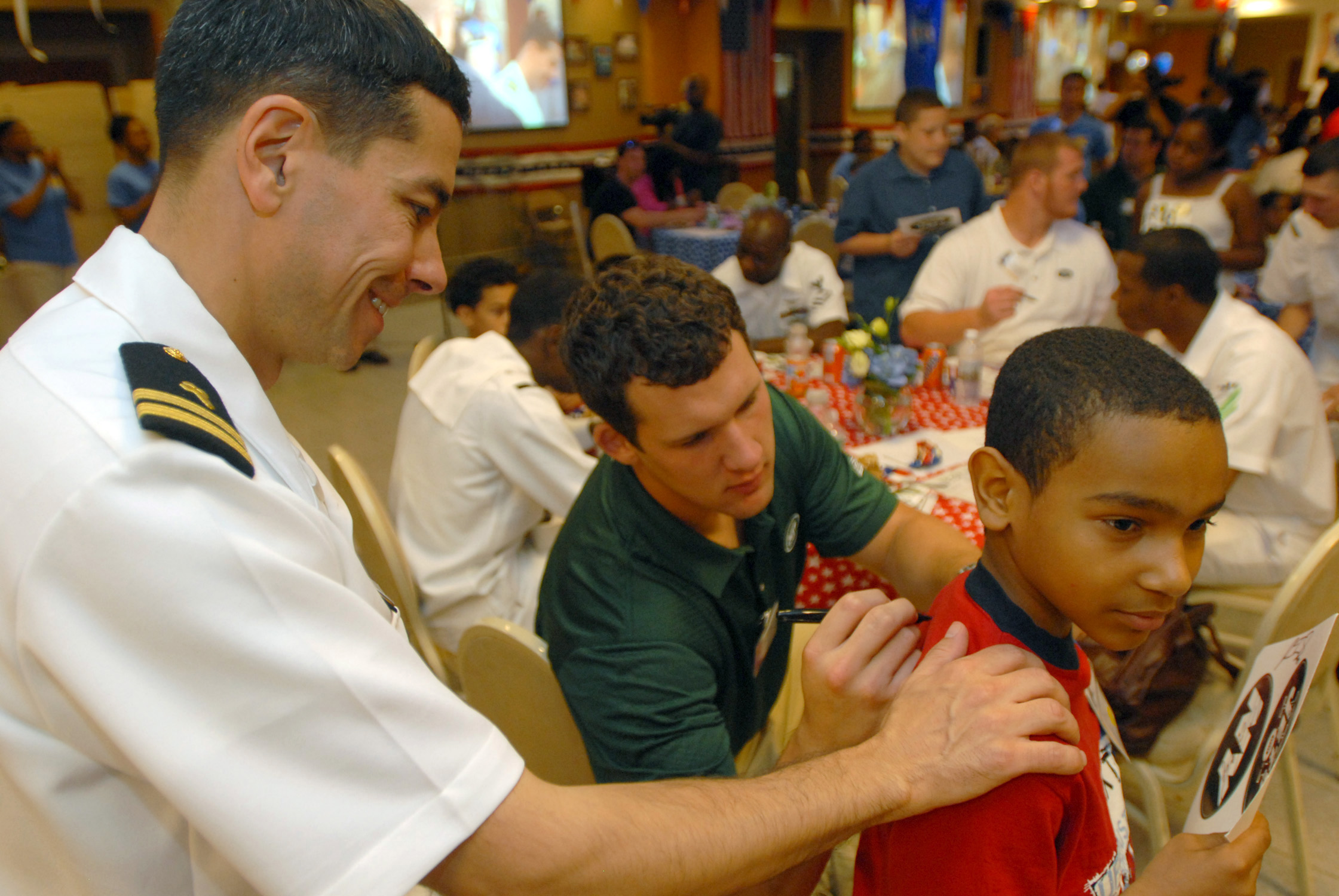
Trusnik signing autographs in 2007 with the Jets.

Trusnik was signed as an undrafted free agent in 2007 by the New York Jets. As a rookie, he appeared in six games and recorded six tackles on special teams after spending the first nine weeks on their practice squad. He made his NFL debut in a game against the Pittsburgh Steelers on November 18. Trusnik was placed on injured reserve on December 26.

In 2008, Trusnik played in seven games and was inactive for two. He also had spent the first seven games of the season on the Physically Unable to Perform list. Trusnik made five tackles and a fumble recovery on defense as well as 11 tackles on special teams.

In 2009, Trusnik played in the first four games of the season with the Jets. He was named AFC Special Teams Player of the Week after his game against Tennessee on September 27, where he had two tackles, a forced fumble, and fumble recovery. Trusnik was then traded to the Cleveland Browns.

=== Cleveland Browns ===
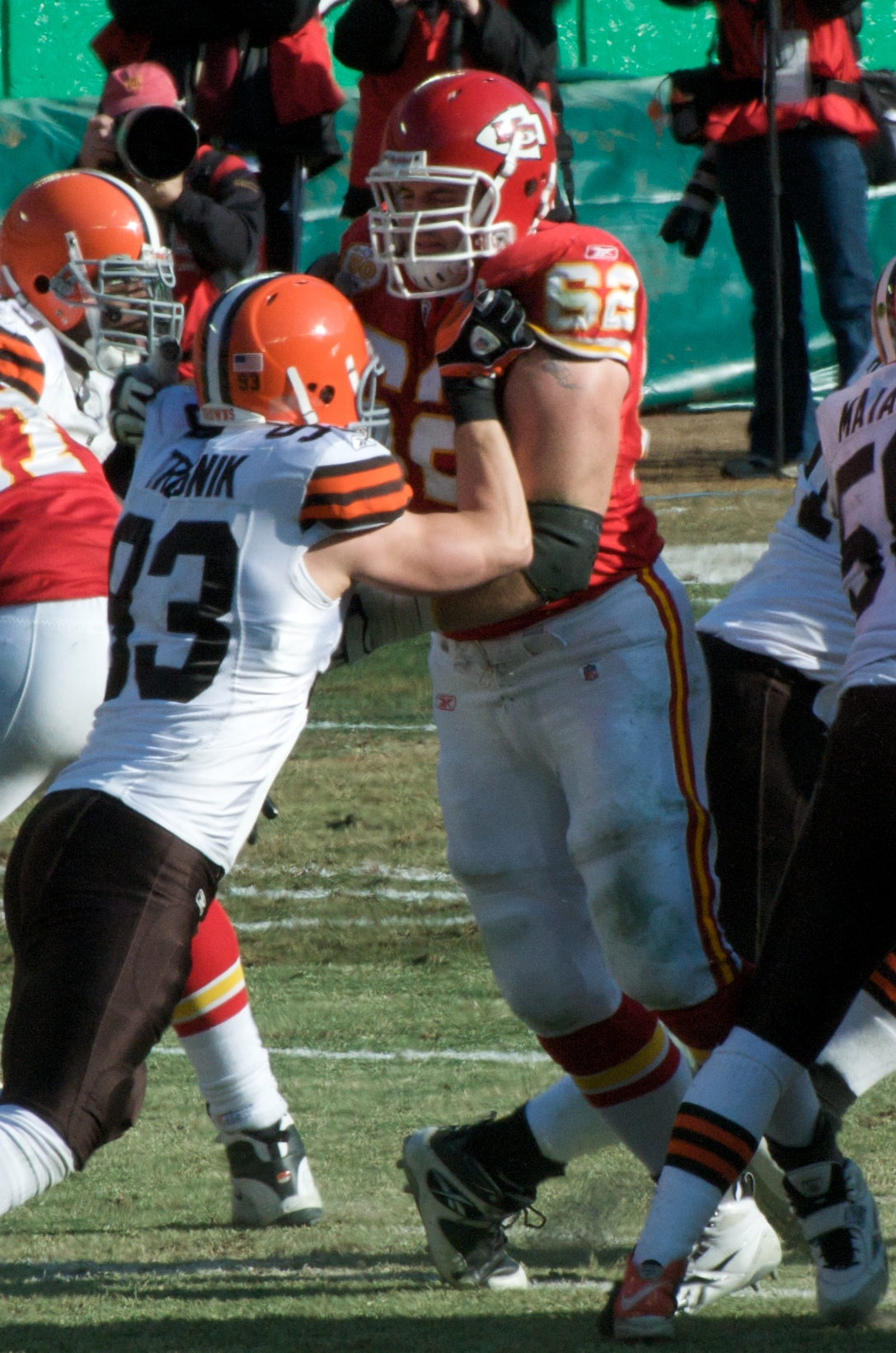
Trusnik (left) with the Cleveland Browns in 2009

On October 7, 2009, Trusnik was traded to the Cleveland Browns by the New York Jets in exchange for wide receiver Braylon Edwards. He played the remainder of the 2009 season with the Browns, where he started 10 games and played in 12. During this time, Trusnik registered 54 tackles, 2.5 sacks, and one pass defensed. His first start of his NFL career came on October 18 in a game at Pittsburgh. Trusnik made a career-high 10 tackles on November 29 in Cincinnati. The Browns finished the season with the best kickoff return average starting position (31.4) in the NFL with Trusnik as a blocker.

In 2010, Trusnik played in all 16 games for the Browns, starting five. He registered 15 tackles, one sack, and one pass defensed. He played mostly on special teams where he had nine tackles.

=== Miami Dolphins ===
On July 27, 2011, the Miami Dolphins signed Trusnik to a 2-year deal. He was with the Dolphins for four seasons, starting 10 games and playing in 64.

In 2014, Trusnik caught his first career interception from a Tom Brady pass on December 14. He also scored his first touchdown off of a fumble recovery against the Jets on December 28.

=== Carolina Panthers ===
On March 31, 2015, the Carolina Panthers signed Trusnik to a 1-year deal as an unrestricted free agent. On September 5, 2015, he was released by the Panthers.

=== Minnesota Vikings ===
On November 10, 2015, the Minnesota Vikings signed Trusnik. He had previously worked with Vikings defensive coordinator, George Edwards, while he was the linebackers coach at Miami from 2012 to 2013.

=== New Orleans Saints ===
On December 14, 2016, Trusnik was signed by the New Orleans Saints.

== NFL career statistics ==
Legend
**Bold**	Career high

=== Regular season ===
Year	Team	Games		Tackles					Interceptions					Fumbles			
Year	Team	GP	GS	Cmb	Solo	Ast	Sck	TFL	Int	Yds	TD	Lng	PD	FF	FR	Yds	TD
2007	NYJ	6	0	8	4	4	0.0	0	0	0	0	0	0	0	0	0	0
2008	NYJ	7	0	10	7	3	0.0	0	0	0	0	0	0	0	1	0	0
2009	NYJ	4	0	6	4	2	0.0	0	0	0	0	0	0	**1**	1	0	0
2009	CLE	12	**10**	**56**	**45**	11	**2.5**	**6**	0	0	0	0	1	**1**	0	0	0
2010	CLE	**16**	5	24	21	3	1.0	1	0	0	0	0	1	0	0	0	0
2011	MIA	**16**	0	18	15	3	0.0	0	0	0	0	0	0	0	0	0	0
2012	MIA	**16**	2	25	17	8	0.0	1	0	0	0	0	0	0	0	0	0
2013	MIA	**16**	2	25	20	5	0.0	1	0	0	0	0	0	0	0	0	0
2014	MIA	**16**	6	49	33	**16**	0.0	3	**1**	0	0	0	**2**	0	**2**	0	0
2015	MIN	8	0	11	10	1	0.0	0	0	0	0	0	0	0	0	0	0
2016	NOR	3	0	0	0	0	0.0	0	0	0	0	0	0	0	0	0	0
		120	25	232	176	56	3.5	12	1	0	0	0	4	2	4	0	0

=== Playoffs ===
Year	Team	Games		Tackles					Interceptions					Fumbles			
Year	Team	GP	GS	Cmb	Solo	Ast	Sck	TFL	Int	Yds	TD	Lng	PD	FF	FR	Yds	TD
2015	MIN	**1**	0	0	0	0	0.0	0	0	0	0	0	0	0	0	0	0
		1	0	0	0	0	0.0	0	0	0	0	0	0	0	0	0	0

== Retirement ==
On April 10, 2018, Trusnik announced his retirement from the National Football League.
