= Marquice Cole =

American football player (born 1983)

No. 23, 34
- Position: Cornerback / Special teamer

Personal information
- Born: November 13, 1983 (age 42); Hazel Crest, Illinois, U.S.
- Listed height: 5 ft 10 in (1.78 m)
- Listed weight: 195 lb (88 kg)

Career information
- High school: Country Club Hills (IL) Hillcrest
- College: Northwestern
- NFL draft: 2007: undrafted

Career history
- Oakland Raiders (2007)*; Tennessee Titans (2007–2008)*; New Orleans Saints (2008)*; New York Jets (2009–2011); New England Patriots (2012–2013); Denver Broncos (2013)
- * Offseason or practice squad member only

Awards and highlights
- Second Team All-Big Ten (2006)

Career NFL statistics
- Total tackles: 73
- Fumble recoveries: 3
- Interceptions: 4
- Defensive touchdowns: 1
- Stats at Pro Football Reference

Marquice Jermal Cole [Mar-KWEECE] (born November 13, 1983) is an American former professional football player who was a cornerback in the National Football League (NFL). He played college football for the Northwestern Wildcats and was signed by the Oakland Raiders as an undrafted free agent in 2007.

Cole was also a member of the Tennessee Titans, New Orleans Saints, New York Jets, New England Patriots, and Denver Broncos

== Professional career ==
Pre-draft measurables
Height	Weight	40-yard dash	10-yard split	20-yard split	20-yard shuttle	Three-cone drill	Vertical jump	Broad jump	Bench press
5 ft 9 1/8 in (1.76 m)	191 lb (87 kg)	4.31 s	1.45 s	2.51 s	3.84 s	6.82 s	34.0 in (0.86 m)	10 ft 5 in (3.18 m)	17 reps
All values from Pro Day

=== Oakland Raiders ===
Cole who went undrafted out of Northwestern was picked up by the Oakland Raiders following the completion of the 2007 NFL Draft. Cole was later waived by the team on September 2, 2007.

=== Tennessee Titans ===
Cole would be signed by the Tennessee Titans and placed on the team's practice squad on December 11, 2007. Cole was later re-signed by the team on January 7, 2008. Cole was later waived by the Titans on August 30, 2008.

=== New Orleans Saints ===
Cole was signed to the New Orleans Saints practice squad on December 10, 2008. He was later released from the team.

=== New York Jets ===
On February 17, 2009, the New York Jets would sign Cole. Cole was waived by the team on September 15, 2009. He was re-signed to the team's practice squad two days later on September 17, 2009. On September 23, 2009, Cole was promoted to the active roster. Cole made several tackles throughout the 2009 season primarily playing on special teams.

Cole was an "integral" part of the Jets' special teams unit as a gunner and he had improved his understanding of the defensive schemes to the point where he was involved in packages on defense. Cole started the Jets' final regular season game against the Buffalo Bills recording his first two interceptions, one of which he returned for his first career touchdown.

Cole, an exclusive rights free agent, signed a one-year contract with the Jets on January 26, 2011.

=== New England Patriots ===
Cole, a free agent, signed with the New England Patriots on March 19, 2012. On March 20, 2013, Cole re-signed with Patriots. The terms of the contract were not disclosed. On September 27, 2013, Cole was released by the Patriots. Cole played in the first 3 regular season games, but recorded no statistics. On October 1, 2013, Cole was re-signed to the Patriots. On December 26, 2013, he was released yet again.

=== Denver Broncos ===
Cole was signed by the Broncos on January 14, 2014, after injuries to Chris Harris Jr. and Derek Wolfe.

== Personal ==
Cole has one son, Marquice Cole Jr. Cole is an MMA fan.
