= Ryan McKee =

American football player (born 1986)

No. 66, 68
- Position: Offensive tackle

Personal information
- Born: November 4, 1986 (age 40); Pine Bluff, Arkansas, U.S.
- Listed height: 6 ft 6 in (1.98 m)
- Listed weight: 319 lb (145 kg)

Career information
- College: Southern Mississippi
- NFL draft: 2009: undrafted

Career history
- New York Jets (2009); St. Louis Rams (2009–2012); Kansas City Chiefs (2014)*
- * Offseason or practice squad member only

Awards and highlights
- Second-team All-Conference USA (2008)
- Stats at Pro Football Reference

Ryan McKee (born November 4, 1986) is an American former professional football offensive tackle. He was signed by the New York Jets as an undrafted free agent in 2009. He played college football at Southern Mississippi. McKee also spent three games on the St. Louis Rams active roster in 2009, as well as being on the team's practice squad from 2010 to 2012.

== Early life ==
McKee attended Daphne High School, Alabama, and was a two-year letter winner there. He finished senior season without allowing a sack all year and was voted All-district and All-county. The year before, as a junior, helped the team to a 14–1 record and a berth in the state championship game.

== College career ==
McKee started three consecutive seasons at right tackle for Southern Mississippi and graduated in December 2008, with a degree in business administration.

In 2008 McKee was a Second-team All-Conference USA offensive tackle. He helped the team run for over 2,000 yards in three straight seasons and was credited with more than 80 knockdowns in 2008. In 2007, he started in all 13 games at right tackle in 2007 and did not allow a sack all season, while tallying two pancake blocks and a team-best 61 knockdowns. He helped Southern Miss set the season record for total offense (4,727) as the Golden Eagles had a 1,000 rusher and 2,000 yards rushing for the second-straight season. In 2006, he helped pave the way for Southern Miss' first 1,000-yard rusher since 2002 and had 58 knockdowns during the campaign, five pancakes and allowed just four sacks. In 2005, he played in three games and finished the year with three knockdowns and one pancake and did not allow a sack.

== Professional career ==
=== Pre-draft ===
Pre-draft measurables
Height	Weight	40-yard dash
6 ft 6 in (1.98 m)	296 lb (134 kg)	5.03 s
All values from NFL Combine.

=== New York Jets ===
McKee was signed by the New York Jets as an undrafted free agent following the 2009 NFL draft. He was waived on September 5, 2009 and re-signed to the practice squad on September 7, 2009. He was promoted from the practice squad on December 12, 2009 however he was waived two days later.

=== St. Louis Rams ===
McKee was claimed off waivers by the St. Louis Rams on December 15, 2009, and was on the team's roster for the final 3 games, though he was only active for one game. McKee spent the 2010, 2011, and 2012 seasons on the Rams practice squad but did return to the team the following season.

=== Kansas City Chiefs ===
On May 27, 2014, the Kansas City Chiefs signed McKee. The Chiefs waived McKee on August 26, 2014.
