= Keith Fitzhugh =

American football player (born 1986)

Profile
- Position: Safety

Personal information
- Born: November 11, 1986 (age 39); Jacksonville, Florida
- Listed height: 5 ft 11 in (1.80 m)
- Listed weight: 205 lb (93 kg)

Career information
- College: Mississippi State
- NFL draft: 2009: undrafted

Career history
- New York Jets (2009)*; Baltimore Ravens (2009); New York Jets (2010)*
- * Offseason or practice squad member only
- Stats at Pro Football Reference

Keith Callay Fitzhugh (born November 11, 1986) is an American former football safety who briefly was in the National Football League. He was signed by the New York Jets as an undrafted free agent in 2009. He played college football at Mississippi State.

== High school ==
Keith graduated from Lovejoy High School in Hampton Georgia a semester early to attend Mississippi State University. He was the first recruit for Coach Sylvester Croom and chose Mississippi State.

== College ==
In 2005, Keith played in 11 games as a true freshman making 13 tackles (including a tackle for loss). In 2006, Keith played in all 12 games and had 59 tackles and 1 interception. In 2007, Keith played in all 13 games and had 58 tackles, 5.5 Tackles for Loss, 1 Sack, and 2 Interceptions. In 2008, Keith played in all 12 games and had 50 tackles, 2.5 sacks and 1 interception He was ranked the 12th best safety in the 2009 NFL Draft by NFL Draft Scout.

== Professional career ==
Fitzhugh went undrafted in 2009 and tryouts with the Jets and Ravens were unsuccessful. On December 8, 2010, Fitzhugh declined an invitation to rejoin the Jets after injuries to safeties Jim Leonhard and James Ihedigbo, in order to provide a steady income for his parents. His father is disabled and unable to work. He works as a conductor for the Norfolk Southern Railway in Atlanta. Kieth has since left Norfolk Southern and worked his way into railroad management, working as Vice President of Operations, Southern Region, for RJ Corman and is current Vice President of Compass Rail in Memphis.

== Personal life ==
Keith currently resides in Hampton, Georgia with his father Keith Fitzhugh, Sr. and mother Meltonia Fitzhugh. Keith has an older brother named Toran and his sister Brittany died at the age of 14 from complications of the West Nile virus.
