= Britt Davis =

American football player (born 1986)

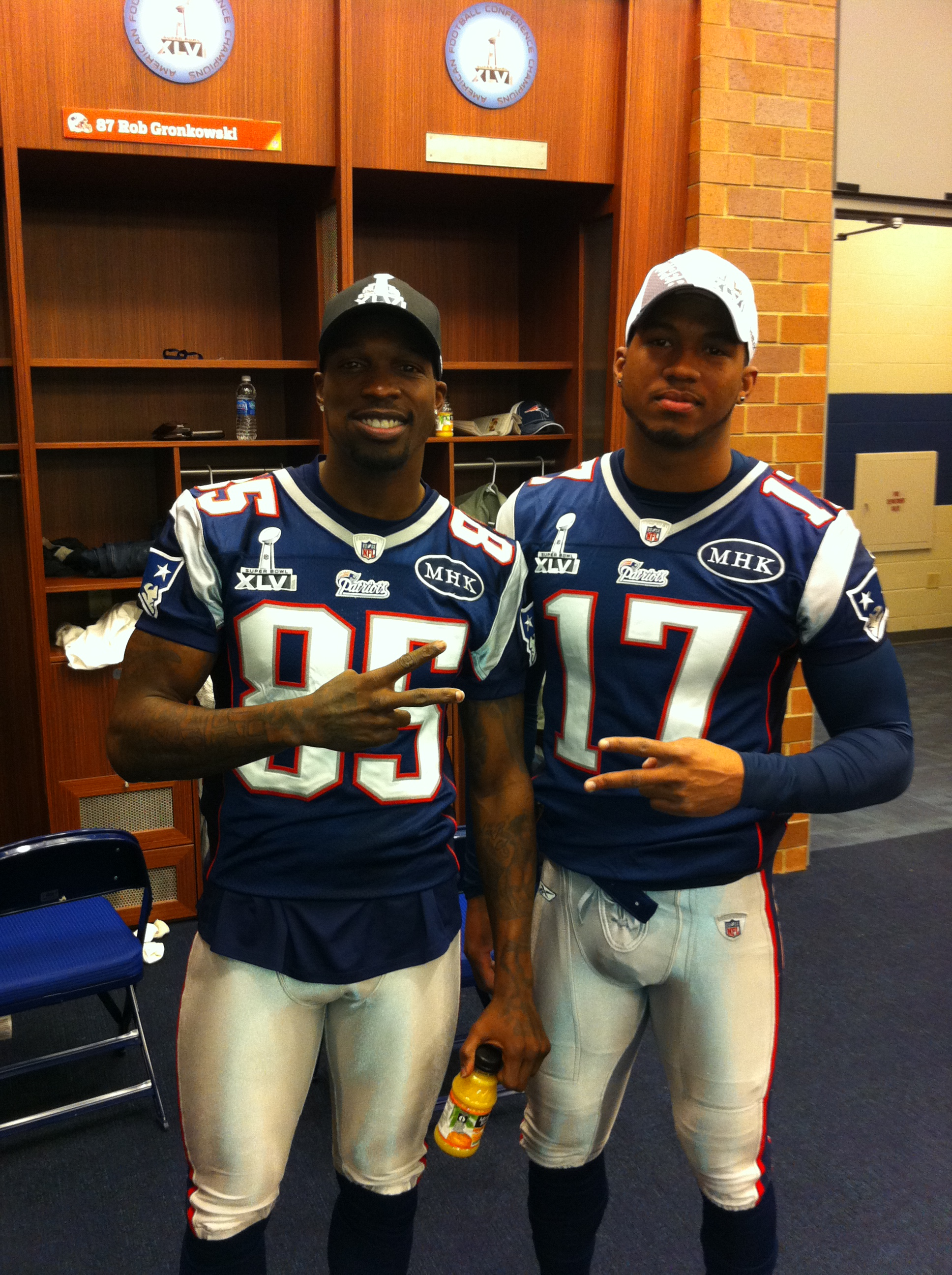
- Davis and Ochocinco in 2012

No. 17
- Position: Wide receiver

Personal information
- Born: April 23, 1986 (age 40); Melrose Park, Illinois, U.S.
- Listed height: 6 ft 3 in (1.91 m)
- Listed weight: 220 lb (100 kg)

Career information
- College: Northern Illinois
- NFL draft: 2009: undrafted

Career history
- New York Jets (2009–2010)*; Denver Broncos (2010); (2011)*; New England Patriots (2011−2012)*
- * Offseason or practice squad member only
- Stats at Pro Football Reference

Britt Davis (born April 23, 1986) is an American former professional football wide receiver. He was signed by the New York Jets of the National Football League (NFL) as an undrafted free agent in 2009. He played college football for the Northern Illinois Huskies.

== Early life ==
Davis attended Riverside-Brookfield High School in Riverside, Illinois. At RBHS he amassed 7,700 career yards total offense and 90 touchdowns in 22 starts as quarterback on two state Class 5A playoff teams. He completed 461-of-766 passes (60.2%) for 6,266 yards, 39 touchdowns and 21 interceptions. He posted nine career 300-yard passing games. He also added 17 rushing touchdowns and 1,434 rushing yards on 163 attempts.

== College career ==
Davis attended college at Northern Illinois University. As a member of the Huskies, he was used almost exclusively as a wide receiver position, Even though originally being recruited for the quarterback position, and finished his career at NIU as fifth on the school all-time charts for career receptions with 146 and totaled 1,676 career receiving yards and 2,063 all-purpose yards. He also completed two-of-four passes and rushed 15 times for 66 yards, and scored nine career touchdowns, eight receiving for 56 total points. He earned a corporate communications major with a minor in black studies.

== Professional career ==
=== New York Jets ===
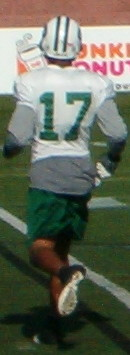
Davis at the Jets 2009 training camp

Davis went undrafted in the 2009 NFL draft and was signed by the New York Jets. He had 5 receptions for 54 yards in the preseason, and was waived on September 5. The Jets re-signed Davis to their practice squad on November 17. Davis, who had been signed to a future contract earlier in the season, was later waived on August 1, 2010 by the Jets.

=== Denver Broncos ===
Davis signed with the Denver Broncos on August 5, 2010 for a two-year deal.

=== New England Patriots ===
Davis was signed to the New England Patriots practice squad on January 4, 2012. He was waived with an injury settlement on August 13, 2012, after sustaining an injury in a preseason game against the New Orleans Saints in which he caught a touchdown from Brian Hoyer.
