= Wallace Wright =

American football player (born 1984)

No. 15
- Position: Wide receiver

Personal information
- Born: February 1, 1984 (age 42); Tampa, Florida, U.S.
- Listed height: 6 ft 1 in (1.85 m)
- Listed weight: 201 lb (91 kg)

Career information
- High school: Pine Forest (Fayetteville, North Carolina)
- College: North Carolina
- NFL draft: 2006: undrafted

Career history
- New York Jets (2006–2009); Carolina Panthers (2010); Tampa Bay Buccaneers (2012)*
- * Offseason or practice squad member only

Career NFL statistics
- Receptions: 8
- Receiving yards: 108
- Stats at Pro Football Reference

Wallace S. Wright II (born February 1, 1984) is an American former professional football player who was a wide receiverin the National Football League. He was signed by the New York Jets as an undrafted free agent in 2006. He played college football for the North Carolina Tar Heels.

He was also a member of the Carolina Panthers and Tampa Bay Buccaneers.

== Professional career ==
Wright left the Jets organization to join the Panthers on March 8, 2010. Wright was released by the Panthers on September 3, 2011 during the final roster cuts prior to the start of the season.
