= Kenwin Cummings =

American football player (born 1986)

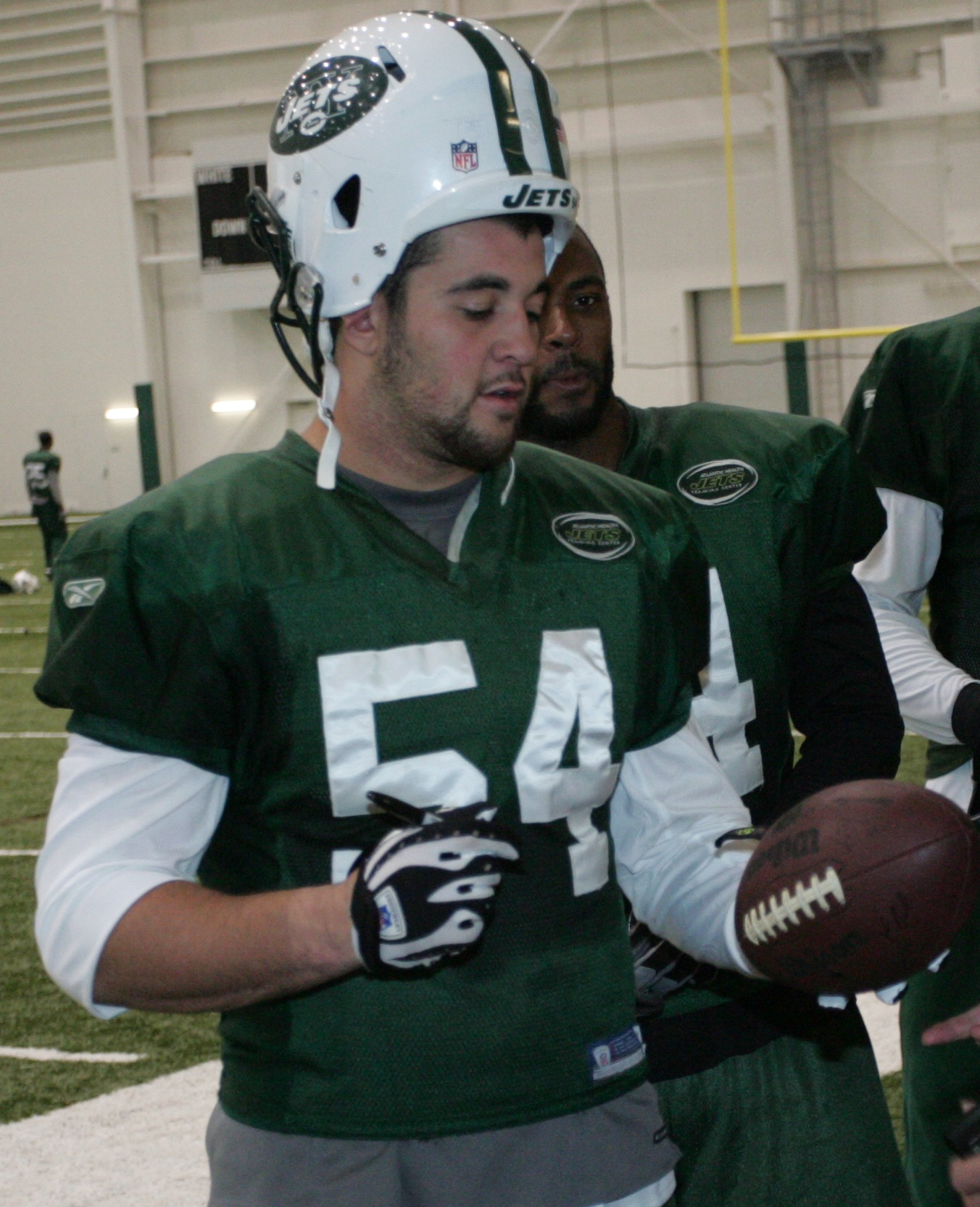

No. 54
- Position: Linebacker

Personal information
- Born: July 23, 1986 (age 40); Maxton, North Carolina, U.S.
- Listed height: 6 ft 3 in (1.91 m)
- Listed weight: 250 lb (113 kg)

Career information
- High school: Purnell Swett (Maxton)
- College: Wingate
- NFL draft: 2008: undrafted

Career history
- New York Jets (2008–2010); Dallas Cowboys (2010)

Career NFL statistics
- Games played: 5
- Total tackles: 1
- Stats at Pro Football Reference

Kenwin Cummings Jr. (born July 23, 1986) is an American former professional football player who was a linebacker in the National Football League (NFL) for the New York Jets and Dallas Cowboys. He played college football for the Wingate Bulldogs.

== Early life ==
Cummings attended Purnell Swett High School. He accepted a football scholarship from Wingate University, where he played as a defensive lineman. As a junior, he posted 66 tackles (24 solo), 9 sacks, 17.5 tackles-for-loss, 3 forced fumbles and 15 quarterback pressures.

As a senior, he made 71 tackles (fifth in school history). He received Don Hansen’s Football Gazette NCAA Division II All-American first-team (2005) and second-team (2006) honors. He finished as the school's All-time leader in sacks and tackles for loss.

In 2019, he was inducted into the Wingate Sports Hall of Fame.

== Professional career ==
=== New York Jets ===
==== 2008 ====
Cummings was signed as an undrafted free agent by the New York Jets after the 2008 NFL draft on May 2.

He was inactive during the team's home opener against the Miami Dolphins and was waived on September 10, only to be signed to the practice squad six days later, where he remained for the rest of the season.

==== 2009 ====
Cummings was released on September 5 and signed to the practice squad on September 7. He was promoted to the active roster in November 16. Cummings made his NFL debut on special teams during the Jets' Wild Card game against the Cincinnati Bengals.

==== 2010 ====
Cummings performed in three games on special teams, without recording any statistics, before being waived on October 22, 2010. He was re-signed to the team's practice squad on October 26.

=== Dallas Cowboys ===
On December 8, 2010, Cummings was signed by the Dallas Cowboys from the Jets practice squad. He played in 2 games and was declared inactive in 2 others. He registered one special teams tackle. He was cut on September 3, 2011.

== Personal life ==
Cummings was born to Kenwin Sr. and Darlene Cummings. Cummings suffers from Type 1 diabetes, which he learned of at age 15. Cummings is a Lumbee Indian, one of the few Native Americans in the NFL.
