= Smile (disambiguation) =

A smile is a facial expression.

Smile may also refer to:

== Computing ==
- Smile (data interchange format), a binary JSON encoding
- Smile (software), a Macintosh programming and working environment
- SMILE project, a program supported by the Directorate-General for the Environment of the European Commission
- Unicode U+2323 (⌣) SMILE, a symbol in the Miscellaneous Technical Unicode block

== Film, theatre, television and radio ==
=== Film and theatre ===
- Smile (1975 film), a film directed by Michael Ritchie
- Smile (2005 film), a film written and directed by Jeffrey Kramer
- Smile (2009 film), an Italian film
- Smile (2022 film), an American horror film
  - Smile 2, the sequel film
- Smile (musical), a 1986 Broadway musical based on the 1975 film

=== Television and radio ===
==== Television episodes ====
- "Smile" (Boston Legal)
- "Smile" (Doctor Who)
- "Smile" (The Facts of Life)
- "Smile" (Law & Order: Criminal Intent)
- "Smile" (Spin City)
- "Smile" (Water Rats)
- "Smile", an episode of The Good Doctor

==== Television series ====
- Smile (American TV series), a 2015 reality TV series about transforming dental work
- Smile (British TV series), a 2002–2007 BBC Sunday morning children's programme
- Smile (Japanese TV series), a 2009 Japanese drama series

==== Networks ====
- Smile (TV network), a former Christian children’s network operated by TBN
- Smile FM, a contemporary Christian radio network
- SmileTV, a range of British television channels

== Literature ==
- Smile (comic book), a 2010 graphic novel by Raina Telgemeier
- Smile (Doyle novel), 2017, by Roddy Doyle
- Smile (magazine), a 1998–2002 American magazine aimed at teenage girls
- Smile! (novel), a 2004 children's book by Geraldine McCaughrean

== Music ==
=== Groups ===
- The Smile (band), a 2020s English rock band consisting of two Radiohead members and Tom Skinner of Sons of Kemet
- Smile (band), a 1968 London band and the precursor to Queen
- Smile (American band), a 1990s rock band
- Smile.dk, a Swedish pop band
- Smile, a southern California band that featured Tommy Girvin

=== Albums ===
- Smile (Beach Boys album), an unfinished Beach Boys album started in 1966 and abandoned in 1967
  - Brian Wilson Presents Smile, a re-recording of the album, 2004
- Smile (Boris album), 2008
- Smile (Cane Hill album), 2016
- Smile (Eve album), 2020
- Smile (Fiona album), 2008
- Smile (The Idea of North album), 2013
- Smile (Jacky Terrasson album), 2002
- Smile (The Jayhawks album), 2000
- Smile (Katy Perry album), 2020
- Smile (L'Arc-en-Ciel album), 2004
- Smile (Lasgo album), 2009
- Smile (Laura Nyro album), 1976
- Smile (Lyle Lovett album), 2003
- Smile (Mai Kuraki album), 2017
- Smile (Marti Pellow album), 2001
- Smile (Mike Park album), 2011
- Smile (Nina Girado album), 2003
- Smile (The Pillows album), 2001
- Smile (Ride album), 1990
- Smile (Simon Webbe album), 2017
- Smile (Smile.dk album), 1998
- Smile! (Vitas album), or the title song, 2002
- Smile?, by K-Trap, 2024
- A Smile, by Dappled Cities Fly, 2004
- Smile×Smile, by Mayumi Iizuka, 2003
- Smile! :D, by Porter Robinson, 2024
- Smile, by Hazel O'Connor, 1984
- Smile!, by the Remo Four, 1967
- Smile, by the Yellow Monkey, 1995
- Smile, by Mike Candys, 2012

=== EPs ===
- Smile (EP), by the Wannadies, 1989
- Smile, by Dune Rats, 2013

=== Songs ===
- "Smile" (Avril Lavigne song), 2011
- "Smile" (Benjamin Ingrosso song), 2021
- "Smile" (Charlie Chaplin song), 1936
- "Smile" (Dami Im song), 2015
- "Smile" (The Emotions song), 1978
- "Smile" (David Gilmour song), 2006
- "Smile" (G-Unit song), 2004
- "Smile" (James Cottriall song), 2011
- "Smile" (Juice Wrld and the Weeknd song), 2020
- "Smile" (Katy Perry song), 2020
- "Smile" (Lily Allen song), 2006
- "Smile" (Lonestar song), 1999
- "Smile" (Morgan Wallen song), 2024
- "Smile" (R5 song), 2014
- "Smile" (Scarface song), 1997
- "Smile" (Sheila Gordhan song), 2015
- "Smile" (Sheppard song), 2014
- "Smile" (Sid song), 2007
- "Smile" (Uncle Kracker song), 2009
- "Smile" (Vitamin C song), 1999
- "Smile" (Wizkid song), featuring H.E.R., 2020
- "Smile (Living My Best Life)" or "Smile Bitch", by Lil Duval, 2018
- "Smile", by AFI from The Art of Drowning, 2000
- "Smile", by the Alchemist from Chemical Warfare, 2009
- "Smile", by Band-Maid from Bubble, 2019
- "Smile", by Big Daddy Karsten, competing at Melodi Grand Prix 2021
- "Smile", by Cheap Trick from The Latest, 2009
- "Smile?", by the Crystal Method from Divided by Night, 2009
- "Smile", by DJ Snake from Carte Blanche, 2019
- "Smile", by Edan from Beauty and the Beat, 2005
- "Smile", by the Fall from Perverted by Language, 1983
- "Smile", by Florida Georgia Line from Anything Goes, 2014
- "Smile", by Heavenly from Le Jardin de Heavenly, 1992
- "Smile", by James Marsters from Civilized Man, 2005
- "Smile", by Jamiroquai from Rock Dust Light Star, 2010
- "Smile", by Jay-Z from 4:44, 2017
- "Smile", by Jibbs from Jibbs Featuring Jibbs, 2006
- "Smile", by Kutless from Hearts of the Innocent, 2006
- "Smile", by Lagwagon from Double Plaidinum, 1997
- "Smile", by Luna from Lunapark, 1992
- "Smile", by Maisie Peters from the soundtrack album Birds of Prey, 2020
- "Smile", by McFly from Radio:Active, 2008
- "Smile", by Nicholas McDonald from In the Arms of an Angel, 2014
- "Smile", by the Nixons from Foma, 1995
- "Smile", by Pearl Jam from No Code, 1996
- "Smile", by Pussycat from First of All, 1976
- "Smile", by Quasi from Field Studies, 1999
- "Smile", by RemyZero from The Golden Hum, 2001
- "Smile", by Rod Wave from Pray 4 Love, 2020
- "Smile", by Shaydee, 2016
- "Smile", by the Story So Far from The Story So Far, 2015
- "Smile", by the Supernaturals from It Doesn't Matter Anymore, 1997
- "Smile", by Tamia from More, 2004
- "Smile", by Taproot from Gift, 2000
- "Smile", by Terri Clark from Roots and Wings, 2011
- "Smile", by Twenty Twenty, 2020
- "Smile", by U2 from U218 Singles, 2006
- "Smile", by Was (Not Was) from Born to Laugh at Tornadoes, 1983
- "Smile", by Weezer from Weezer, 2001
- "Smile", by Will Powers from Dancing for Mental Health, 1983
- "Smile", by Wolf Alice from Blue Weekend, 2021
- "Smile (Pictures or It Didn't Happen)", by Amanda Palmer from Theatre Is Evil, 2012
- "S.M.I.L.E.", by Psychic TV from Towards Thee Infinite Beat, 1990

== Places ==
- Smile, Kentucky
- Smile, Alchevsk Raion, Luhansk Oblast, a village in Ukraine, near the ground electrode of HVDC Volgograd–Donbass

== Other uses ==
- Small incision lenticule extraction, a form of laser eye surgery
- SmILE, a car designed by Greenpeace
- Smile (actress) (born 1986), Burmese actress
- Smile (bank), a British internet bank
- Smile (horse) (1982–1997), an American Thoroughbred racehorse
- SMILE (spacecraft), Solar wind Magnetosphere Ionosphere Link Explorer, a satellite
- Stanford Mobile Inquiry-based Learning Environment (SMILE), a mobile learning management platform
- XIX Smile, a Swiss paraglider design
- Smile by Webshots, a photo sharing service by Webshots

== See also ==
- Smiles (disambiguation)
- Smiler (disambiguation)
- Smiley (disambiguation)
- Smilin'
- SMIL (disambiguation)
- The Smile (disambiguation)
