= Smiley (disambiguation) =

A smiley is a sketchy representation of a smiling face, usually yellow.

Smiley may also refer to:

== Places ==
=== United States ===
- Smiley Township, Pennington County, Minnesota
- Smiley, Texas, a city
- Smiley, Virginia, an unincorporated community
- Smiley Mountain, Idaho

=== Elsewhere ===
- Smiley, Saskatchewan, Canada, a village
- 1613 Smiley, a belt asteroid named for American astronomer Charles Hugh Smiley
- 15760 Albion, a trans-Neptunian object, the first discovered, for which Smiley was an early proposed name

== Arts and entertainment ==
=== Film and television ===
- Smiley (1956 film), a British-American film set in Australia
- Smiley Face (film), an American comedy film
- Smiley (2012 film), an American psychological slasher film
- Smiley (TV series), a Spanish romantic comedy television series.

=== Performers ===
- Smiley (musician), Aruba-born Dutch reggae musician, formerly of reggae band Out of Many
- Smiley (rapper), Canadian rapper
- Smiley (singer), Romanian singer, songwriter, producer
- Smiley, pseudonym of Kyle Ward (musician), contributor to the In The Groove dance music game series
- Smiley, nickname for record producer Warryn Campbell (born 1975)
- Smiley Burnette, stage name of singer-songwriter, musician, film and TV actor Lester Alvin Burnette (1911–1967)
- Smiley Lewis (1913–1966), stage name of American New Orleans rhythm and blues singer and guitarist Overton Lemons (1913–1966)

=== Songs ===
- "Smiley", a 1969 song by Ronnie Burns
- "Smiley", a song on The Smashing Pumpkins' Peel Sessions EP
- "Smiley", a 2022 song by Choi Ye-na

== People and fictional characters ==
- Smiley (surname), a list of people and fictional characters with the surname
- Smiley Creswell (born 1959), American former National Football League player
- Smiley (nickname), a list of people and fictional characters
- Living Smile Vidya (born 1982), or Smiley, Indian trans woman actor, assistant director, writer, and trans and Dalit rights activist

== Other uses ==
- Smiley baronets, a title in the Baronetage of the United Kingdom
- the cookie mascot at Eat'n Park
- a common name for an upper lip frenulum piercing
- another name for a chainlock, an improvised weapon made from a length of chain attached to a lock or other heavy piece of metal
- Smiley (alligator), at the time of his death, the oldest alligator in captivity

== See also ==
- "Mr. Smiley", a song by Poison from Crack a Smile
- "Mr. Smiley", a song by Mustard Plug on Big Daddy Multitude
- Miley Cyrus, known as Smiley Miley
- Smiley Smile, an album by the Beach Boys released in 1967
- Smillie, a surname
- Smylie, a surname
- Smilie (disambiguation)
- Smiley Face (disambiguation)
- Smyley Island, Antarctica
