= Smylie =

Smylie is a surname and may refer to:

- Smylie Kaufman (born 1991), American professional golfer
- Adarrial Smylie, American former basketball player
- Ashley Smylie, American murder victim
- Chris Smylie (born 1982), New Zealand rugby union player
- Daryl Smylie (born 1985), Northern Irish footballer
- Dennis Smylie, American bass clarinettist
- Ed Smylie (1929–2025), American engineer with NASA
- Elizabeth Smylie (born 1963), retired Australian professional tennis player
- James H. Smylie (1925–2019), Emeritus Professor of Church History and author
- John Sheridan Smylie, the ninth and current bishop of the Episcopal Diocese of Wyoming
- Mark Smylie, American comics creator, writer and illustrator
- Robert E. Smylie (1914–2004), American politician and attorney from Idaho
- Rod Smylie (1895–1985), Canadian professional ice hockey player
- Ryan Smylie (born 1992), professional footballer

== See also ==
- Smiley (disambiguation)
- Smillie surname page
- Smilie (disambiguation)
- Osmylidae
