= Smiler =

Smiler(s) may refer to:

== Characters ==
- "Smiler" Grogan, from the 1963 film It's a Mad, Mad, Mad, Mad World
- Clem "Smiler" Hemmingway, from the British sitcom Last of the Summer Wine
- The Smiler, from the comics series Transmetropolitan
- Smiler, main antagonist of The Emoji Movie

== Music ==
- Smiler (musician) (active beginning 2009), British rapper
- Smiler (album), 1974, by Rod Stewart
- Smilers, an Estonian rock band named for Stewart's album
- Smiler, a 1970s UK band whose members included Iron Maiden founder Steve Harris

== Other uses ==
- Smilers sheet, Britain's first personalised postage stamp sheet, issued in 2000
- The Smiler, a ride at Alton Towers, England
- Smiler, a strip in the British comic Whoopee!
- Smiler, a nickname for fans of singer-songwriter Miley Cyrus

== See also ==
- Smile (disambiguation)
- Smiley (disambiguation)
