= 2009 Outback Bowl =

- 23rd Outback Bowl
South Carolina Gamecocks	Iowa Hawkeyes
(7–5)	(8–4)
SEC	Big Ten
10	31
Head coach: Steve Spurrier	Head coach: Kirk Ferentz
	1	2	3	4	Total
South Carolina	0	0	0	10	10
Iowa	14	7	10	0	31
- Date: January 1, 2009
- Season: 2008
- Stadium: Raymond James Stadium
- Location: Tampa, Florida
- MVP: Shonn Greene (Iowa RB)
- Favorite: Iowa by 4
- Referee: John McDaid (Big East)
- Attendance: 55,117
- Payout: US$3.2 Million

United States TV coverage
- Network: ESPN
- Announcers: Sean McDonough, Chris Spielman
- Nielsen ratings: 2.7

The 2009 Outback Bowl was a college football bowl game played on January 1, 2009, at Raymond James Stadium in Tampa, Florida. The 23rd edition of the Outback Bowl, it was one of the 2008–09 bowl games concluding the 2008 NCAA Division I FBS football season. Scheduled for a kickoff of 11 a.m. EST and telecast on ESPN, the game pitted the South Carolina Gamecocks against the Iowa Hawkeyes.

Iowa jumped out to a large lead, leading South Carolina 21–0 at halftime and 31–0 at the end of the third quarter, en route to a 31–10 victory. Shonn Greene, the MVP, had 29 rushes for 121 yards and three rushing touchdowns.

== Teams ==
The game featured the Iowa Hawkeyes of the Big Ten Conference and the South Carolina Gamecocks of the Southeastern Conference. It was the first meeting between the two teams. It was each team's third appearance in the Outback Bowl.

=== Iowa Hawkeyes ===
The Hawkeyes entered the game with wins in five of their previous six games, highlighted by an upset of #3 Penn State, and an overall record of 8–4 (5–3 Big Ten). Junior running back Shonn Greene earned consensus First-team All-American honors and received the Doak Walker Award.

=== South Carolina Gamecocks ===
The Gamecocks dropped their final two regular season games and entered the Outback Bowl with an overall record of 7–5 (4–4 SEC).

== Game summary ==
=== Scoring summary ===
Scoring Play	Score
1st Quarter
Iowa - Trey Stross 6-yard TD pass from Ricky Stanzi (Daniel Murray kick), 7:39	Iowa 7–0
Iowa - Shonn Greene 1-yard TD run (Murray kick), 4:41	Iowa 14–0
2nd Quarter
Iowa - Greene 1-yard TD run (Murray kick), 8:09	Iowa 21–0
3rd Quarter
Iowa - Murray 18-yard FG, 9:09	Iowa 24–0
Iowa - Greene 11-yard TD run, :04	Iowa 31–0
4th Quarter
USC - Jared Cook 10-yard TD pass from Chris Smelley (Ryan Succop kick), 13:35	Iowa 31–7
USC - Succop 48-yard FG, 2:02	Iowa 31–10

=== Statistics ===
	1	2	3	4	Total
Gamecocks	0	0	0	10	10
Hawkeyes	14	7	10	0	31

Statistics	SC	IOWA
First downs	17	22
Plays–yards	64–313	66–328
Rushes–yards	14–43	47–181
Passing yards	270	147
Passing: comp–att–int	26–50–3	13–19–2
Time of possession	24:06	35:54

Team	Category	Player	Statistics
South Carolina	Passing	Chris Smelley	16/31, 179 yds, 1 TD, 0 INT
South Carolina	Rushing	Stephen Garcia	5 car, 25 yds
South Carolina	Receiving	Kenny McKinley	6 rec, 86 yds
Iowa	Passing	Ricky Stanzi	13/19, 147 yds, 1 TD, 2 INT
Iowa	Rushing	Shonn Greene	29 car, 121 yds, 3 TD
Iowa	Receiving	Brandon Myers	4 rec, 49 yds
