= May Oo =

Burmese LGBTQ+ rights activist

- မေဦး
- Born: Hein Min Oo; 29 July 1988 (age 37); Yangon, Myanmar
- Education: East Yangon University
- Occupations: Make-up artist, LGBTQ+ rights activist, revolutionary
- Years active: 2007–present

May Oo (Burmese: မေဦး; born Hein Min Oo (Burmese: ဟိန်းမင်းဦး); on 29 July 1988) is a Burmese make-up artist. He was named in The Myanmar Times "Top 10 Make-up artists" list in 2018.

Following the 2021 Myanmar coup d'état, May Oo became one of the most prominent vocal critics of Myanmar's ruling military junta. Because of his involvement in anti-coup protests, an arrest warrant was issued for him.

== Early life and education ==
May Oo was born on July 29, 1988, in Yangon, Myanmar. He favoured a female identity and was constantly misunderstood, discriminated against, and abused, even within his family. He attended high school at Basic Education High School No. 1 Dawbon and studied at East Yangon University.

== Career ==
Around 2007, May Oo learned make-up artistry from make-up artist December Hnin. At the age of 26, May Oo opened his own beauty salon in Yangon. He offered to work for popular movie stars and made a name for himself in the make-up industry. He rose to prominence while working with actress Wutt Hmone Shwe Yi.

In 2016, he studied make-up at the Make Up Forever Academy and Chic Studio in New York. In 2018, he partnered with Maybelline Myanmar and joined as a make-up artist at New York Fashion Week. He was chosen as make-up artist for the popular film Mi.

May Oo opened the beauty school CMM Luxury Beauty Academy & Studio in 2018 and May & Co Wedding Planner in 2019. In April 2019, he won the Costume and Makeup Award for his work with the film Mi at the 2018 Star Awards Ceremony.

May Oo is acknowledged as an LGBT role model within the Burmese LGBT community. May Oo and his boyfriend, Han Lin, are celebrated as Myanmar's iconic LGBT couple. They are dedicated LGBTQ+ rights activists who advocate for LGBT rights in Myanmar and have actively engaged in numerous LGBT rights campaigns in Yangon.

== Donations ==
In 2018, May Oo and his boyfriend Han Lin donated two rings worth a total of 86 lakh Burmese Kyats to Botataung Pagoda on Myanmar New Year's Day.

== Political activities ==
Following the 2021 Myanmar coup d'état, May Oo participated in the anti-coup movement at rallies and through social media. Denouncing the military coup, he took part in protests, starting in February of that year. He joined the "We Want Justice" three-finger salute movement. The movement was launched on social media and has been joined by many celebrities.

On 2 April 2021, warrants for May Oo's arrest were issued under Section 505 (a) of the penal code by the State Administration Council for speaking out against the military coup. Along with several other celebrities, he was charged with calling for participation in the Civil Disobedience Movement (CDM), damaging the state's ability to govern, supporting the Committee Representing Pyidaungsu Hluttaw, and generally inciting the people to disturb the peace and stability of the nation. The charges prompted him to flee to the jungle where he joined the Free Burma Rangers.

He eventually fled to the United States as a political refugee. On 17 February 2022, the military council confiscated his homes and business property. On 1 April, the military council announced that his citizenship had been terminated. After relocating to the U.S., his political reputation was tarnished, and he encountered substantial criticism due to his close connection with the businesswoman Simile, known for her strong ties to the military junta. He called her "Sugar Mommy" and became a target of the social punishment movement in Myanmar. May Oo and her boyfriend Han Lin became targets of netizens again after making a special birthday wish to Smile on June 22, while not extending birthday wishes to the detained leader Aung San Suu Kyi on June 19. This led to widespread anger, prompting many comments on social media such as 'betrayal of the revolution' and 'gave up your revolutionary image to become housemaids of Smile?'.
