= 2008 South Carolina Gamecocks football team =

American college football season

2008 South Carolina Gamecocks football

Outback Bowl, L 10–31 vs. Iowa
- Conference: Southeastern Conference
- Eastern Division
- Record: 7–6 (4–4 SEC)
- Head coach: Steve Spurrier (4th season)
- Offensive scheme: Fun and gun
- Defensive coordinator: Ellis Johnson (1st season)
- Base defense: 4–2–5
- Home stadium: Williams-Brice Stadium

2008 Southeastern Conference football standings
	Conf.			Overall
Team	W		L	W		L
Eastern Division
No. 1 Florida x$#	7	–	1	13	–	1
No. 13 Georgia	6	–	2	10	–	3
Vanderbilt	4	–	4	7	–	6
South Carolina	4	–	4	7	–	6
Tennessee	3	–	5	5	–	7
Kentucky	2	–	6	7	–	6
Western Division
No. 6 Alabama x%	8	–	0	12	–	2
No. 14 Ole Miss	5	–	3	9	–	4
LSU	3	–	5	8	–	5
Arkansas	2	–	6	5	–	7
Auburn	2	–	6	5	–	7
Mississippi State	2	–	6	4	–	8
Championship: Florida 31, Alabama 20
# – BCS National Champion; $ – BCS representative as conference champion; % – BCS at-large representative; x – Division champion/co-champions; Rankings from AP Poll

The 2008 South Carolina Gamecocks football team represented the University of South Carolina in the 2008 NCAA Division I FBS football season. The team's head coach was Steve Spurrier, who served his fourth season at USC. The Gamecocks played their home games at Williams-Brice Stadium in Columbia, South Carolina. The team compiled a record of 7–6.

South Carolina had the top defense in the country by October, but also three different starting quarterbacks and one of the worst offensive lines in the country throughout the year. After Tommy Beecher sustained a poor performance and injury in the season-opener against NC State, the team's offense alternated mainly between quarterbacks Chris Smelley and Stephen Garcia. The Gamecocks nearly upset No. 2 Georgia and defending national champion No. 13 LSU, but fell short in both games.

== Preseason ==
Carolina had their first spring practice on March 21, 2008. It was the first of 15 spring practice sessions for the Gamecocks, who returned 54 lettermen in Steve Spurrier's fourth season. The annual Garnet & Black Spring Game was scheduled for 1:00 p.m., Saturday, April 19.

== Schedule ==
Date	Time	Opponent	Rank	Site	TV	Result	Attendance
August 28	8:00 pm	NC State*		Williams–Brice Stadium; Columbia, SC	ESPN	W 34–0	80,616
September 4	8:30 pm	at Vanderbilt	No. 24	Vanderbilt Stadium; Nashville, TN	ESPN	L 17–24	36,850
September 13	3:30 pm	No. 2 Georgia		Williams–Brice Stadium; Columbia, SC (rivalry)	CBS	L 7–14	83,704
September 20	7:00 pm	Wofford*		Williams-Brice Stadium; Columbia, SC	PPV	W 23–13	76,599
September 27	7:00 pm	UAB*		Williams–Brice Stadium; Columbia, SC	PPV	W 26–13	78,286
October 4	2:00 pm	at Ole Miss		Vaught–Hemingway Stadium; Oxford, MS	PPV	W 31–24	54,628
October 11	12:30 pm	at Kentucky		Commonwealth Stadium; Lexington, KY	Raycom	W 24–17	70,822
October 18	8:00 pm	No. 13 LSU^{†}		Williams–Brice Stadium; Columbia, SC	ESPN	L 17–24	82,477
November 1	7:00 pm	Tennessee		Williams–Brice Stadium; Columbia, SC (rivalry)	ESPN2	W 27–6	81,731
November 8	1:00 pm	Arkansas		Williams–Brice Stadium; Columbia, SC	PPV	W 34–21	80,290
November 15	3:30 pm	at No. 3 Florida	No. 24	Ben Hill Griffin Stadium; Gainesville, FL	CBS	L 6–56	90,646
November 29	12:00 pm	at Clemson*		Memorial Stadium; Clemson, SC (rivalry)	ESPN2	L 14–31	81,500
January 1	11:00 am	vs. Iowa*		Raymond James Stadium; Tampa, FL (Outback Bowl)	ESPN	L 10–31	55,117
*Non-conference game; ^{†}Homecoming; Rankings from AP Poll released prior to the game; All times are in Eastern time

Radio coverage for all games was provided by the Gamecock Sports Radio Network.

== Game summaries ==
=== North Carolina State ===
	1	2	3	4	Total
Wolfpack	0	0	0	0	0
Gamecocks	0	3	10	21	34

=== Vanderbilt ===
	1	2	3	4	Total
Gamecocks	7	3	0	7	17
Commodores	0	3	14	7	24

=== Georgia ===
	1	2	3	4	Total
Bulldogs	0	6	8	0	14
Gamecocks	0	7	0	0	7

=== Wofford ===
	1	2	3	4	Total
Terriers	0	7	3	3	13
Gamecocks	0	10	3	10	23

=== UAB ===
	1	2	3	4	Total
Blazers	3	3	0	7	13
Gamecocks	10	10	3	3	26

=== Mississippi ===
	1	2	3	4	Total
Gamecocks	3	14	7	7	31
Rebels	14	7	0	3	24

=== Kentucky ===
	1	2	3	4	Total
Gamecocks	7	7	0	10	24
Wildcats	7	10	0	0	17

=== LSU ===
	1	2	3	4	Total
Tigers	3	7	7	7	24
Gamecocks	0	17	0	0	17

=== Tennessee ===
	1	2	3	4	Total
Volunteers	0	0	6	0	6
Gamecocks	7	14	3	3	27

=== Arkansas ===
	1	2	3	4	Total
Razorbacks	0	7	7	7	21
Gamecocks	10	7	3	14	34

=== Florida ===
	1	2	3	4	Total
Gamecocks	0	3	3	0	6
Gators	21	7	14	14	56

=== Clemson ===
	1	2	3	4	Total
Gamecocks	0	7	7	0	14
Tigers	10	14	7	0	31

== Players ==
=== Depth chart ===
These are the projected starters and primary backups for the Outback Bowl on January 1, 2009.

Defense

FS
Chris Culliver
Akeem Auguste

WLB	MLB	SLB
⋅	Jasper Brinkley	⋅
Dustin Lindsey	Rodney Paulk	⋅

SS
Darian Stewart
Dion LeCorn

CB
Captain Munnerlyn
Addison Williams

DE	DT	DT	DE
Jordin Lindsey	Nathan Pepper	Ladi Ajiboye	Cliff Matthews
Clifton Geathers	Travian Robertson	Jonathan Williams	Byron McKnight

CB
Stoney Woodson
Carlos Thomas

Offense

WR
Jason Barnes
Moe Brown

LT	LG	C	RG	RT
Jarriel King	Jamon Meredith	Garrett Anderson	Terrence Campbell	Justin Sorensen
Hutch Eckerson	Kevin Young	Seaver Brown	Quintin Richardson	Hutch Eckerson

TE
Jared Cook
Weslye Saunders

WR
Kenny McKinley
Joe Hills

QB
Stephen Garcia
Chris Smelley

RB
Mike Davis
Eric Baker

FB
Patrick DiMarco
Bryan Kingrey

Key Committed Freshmen

Antonio Allen – DB Akeem Auguste – DB Eric Baker – RB Reggie Bowens – LB Jarrett Burns – ATH Ronald Byrd – DL Kenny Davis – DL Aramis Hillary – QB T.J. Johnson – OL Jarriel King – DL Reid McCollum – QB Kenneth Miles – RB D.L. Moore – WR Darrell Simmons - DB Jay Spearman – DB Chaz Sutton – DL Devin Taylor – DL Mike Triglia – TE Charles Whitlock – DB/WR Elliot Williams - OL LaCharles Lindsey - WR

=== Roster ===
Wide Receiver: 4 Jason Barnes -Freshman; 8 Larry Freeman - Sophomore; 11 Kenny McKinley - Senior; 13 Mark Barnes - Freshman; 14 La’Charles Lindsey Freshman; 17 Chris Culliver - Sophomore; 18 Dion Lecorn - Sophomore; 81 Paul Haile - Junior; 82 Freddie Brown, III - Junior; 83 Scott Spurrier - Junior; 85 Joe Hills - Freshman; 89 Leon Gamble - Senior; 14 LaCharles Lindsey - “Sophomore”; Offensive Lineman: 54 Hardee Sanders - Junior; 57 Lemuel Jeanpierre - Junior; 62 Pierre Andrews - Sophomore; 63 Seaver Brown - Sophomore; 64 Kevin Young - Sophomore; 65 Ryan Broadhead - Freshman; 66 Hutch Eckerson - Junior; 68 Kyle Nunn - Freshmen; 70 Garrett Anderson - Junior; 72 Quintin Richardson - Freshman; 74 Heath Batchelor - Sophomore; 75 Gurminder Thind - Senior; 76 Jeremy Burgess - Senior; 77 Jamon Meredith - Senior; 78 Justin Sorensen - Senior; Tight End: 19 Nick Prochak - Sophomore; 84 Jared Cook - Junior; 87 Alex McGrath - Senior; 88 Weslye Saunders - Sophomore; 90 Foxy Foxworth - Sophomore	Quarterback: 5 Stephen Garcia - Freshman; 6 Tommy Beecher - Junior; 7 Chris Smelley - Sophomore; 16 Michael McQueeney - Junior; 17 Zac Brindise - Sophomore; Running Back: 10 Brian Maddox - Sophomore; 22 Bobby Wallace - Junior; 20 Taylor Rank - Junior; 25 Mike Davis - Senior; Fullback: 35 Jim Hutton - Junior; 44 Clark Gaston - Sophomore; 46 Bryan Kingrey - Senior; 47 Patrick DiMarco - Sophomore; Defensive tackle: 61 Donte'e Nicholls - Freshman; 79 Marque Hall - Senior; 81 Terrence Campbell - Sophomore; 91 Ladi Ajiboye - Sophomore; 95 Nathan Pepper - Junior; 97 Kenrick Ellis - Sophomore; Defensive End: 40 Eric Norwood - Junior; 42 Travian Robertson - Sophomore; 83 Cliff Matthews - Sophomore; 92 Byron McKnight - Freshman; 96 Clifton Geathers - Sophomore; 99 Jonathan Williams - Senior	Cornerback: 1 Captain Munnerlyn - Junior; 5 Carlos Thomas - Senior; 7 Addison Williams - Sophomore; 28 Chris Hail - Junior; 36 Stoney Woodson - Senior; 4 Cedric Snead - Freshman; Defensive Back: 23 Jamire Williams - Freshman; Linebacker: 4 Alonzo Winfield - Freshman; 6 Melvin Ingram - Sophomore; 30 Yvan Banag - Senior; 31 Gerrod Sinclair - Junior; 44 Dustin Lindsey - Senior; 45 Rodney Paulk - Junior; 48 Vandaral Shackleford - Junior; 49 Damien Wright - Junior; 53 Marvin Sapp - Senior; 58 John Guerry - Junior; 52 Jasper Brinkley - Senior; Free Safety: 32 Darian Stewart - Junior; 42 Mike Newton - Senior; Strong Safety: 21 Emanuel Cook - Junior; 34 Douglas Peterson - Senior; Long Snapper: 59 Charles Turner - Sophomore; Punter / Place Kicker: 14 Ryan Succop - Senior; 87 Spencer Lanning - Sophomore; 97 Nate Spurrier - Junior

== Rankings ==
Ranking movements Legend: ██ Increase in ranking ██ Decrease in ranking — = Not ranked
	Week															
Poll	Pre	1	2	3	4	5	6	7	8	9	10	11	12	13	14	Final
AP	—	24	—	—	—	—	—	—	—	—	—	24	—	—	—	
Coaches	—	24	—	—	—	—	—	—	—	—	—	23	—	—	—	
Harris	Not released				—	—	—	—	—	—	—	24	—	—	—	Not released
BCS	Not released								—	—	—	25	—	—	—	Not released

== Statistics ==
=== Team ===
	USC	Opp
Scoring	270	274
Points per game	20.8	21.1
First downs	241	214
Rushing	91	98
Passing	129	95
Penalty	21	21
Total offense	4115	3795
Avg per play	4.7	4.7
Avg per game	316.5	291.5
Fumbles-Lost	23-11	21-13
Penalties-Yards	75-640	69-586
Avg per game	49.2	45.1

	USC	Opp
Punts-Yards	49-2019	70-2986
Avg per punt	41.2	42.4
Time of possession/Game	29:42	30:18
3rd down conversions	70/180	66/177
4th down conversions	12/18	5/11
Touchdowns scored	30	34
Field goals-Attempts	20-30	12-19
PAT-Attempts	30-30	32-32
Attendance	563,703	334,446
Games/Avg per Game	7/80,529	5/66,889

==== Scores by quarter ====
	1	2	3	4	Total
South Carolina	44	102	39	85	270
Opponents	72	78	76	48	274

=== Offense ===
==== Rushing ====
Name	GP-GS	Att	Gain	Loss	Net	Avg	TD	Long	Avg/G
Mike Davis	12-11	163	615	42	573	3.5	3	50	47.8
Brian Maddox	7-0	32	128	7	121	3.8	1	13	17.3
Eric Baker	9-0	46	191	9	182	4.0	0	20	20.2
Bobby Wallace	8-0	25	110	11	99	4.0	0	21	14.1
Stephen Garcia	8-3	70	289	91	198	2.8	2	25	24.8
Total		403	1489	309	1180	2.9	7	50	98.3
Opponents		429	1872	328	1544	3.6	20	80	128.7

==== Passing ====
Name	GP-GS	Effic	Cmp-Att-Int	Pct	Yds	TD	Lng	Avg/G
Chris Smelley	12-9	114.78	169-302-15	56.0	1922	14	66	160.2
Stephen Garcia	8-3	113.60	65-122-8	53.3	832	6	41	107.6
Tommy Beecher	2-1	63.8	26-14-4	53.8	126	0	18	63.0
Total		113.9	249-452-27	55.1	2892	20	66	222.5
Opponents		110.0	189-328-14	57.0	1923	9	70	159.2

==== Receiving ====
Name	GP-GS	No.	Yds	Avg	TD	Long	Avg/G
Kenny McKinley		54	642	11.9	4	41	64.2
Jared Cook		37	573	15.5	3	66	44.1
Moe Brown		30	391	13.0	1	34	30.1
Jason Barnes		27	346	12.8	2	38	28.8
Mike Davis		24	213	8.9	1	18	17.8
Weslye Saunders		16	214	13.4	3	27	16.5
Dion LeCorn		14	106	7.6	2	20	17.7
Joe Hills		11	87	7.9	1	24	7.9
Freddie Brown		7	66	9.4	1	16	9.4
Total		249	2842	11.6	20	66	222.5
Opponents		189	2070	11.0	9	70	159.2

=== Defense ===
Name	GP	Tackles				Sacks	Pass defense		Interceptions				Fumbles		Blkd Kick
Name	GP	Solo	Ast	Total	TFL-Yds	No-Yds	BrUp	QBH	No.-Yds	Avg	TD	Long	Rcv-Yds	FF	Blkd Kick
Total		332	156	488	36-140	12-81	19	24	8-126	15.8		46	6-81	7	1

=== Special teams ===
Name	Punting								Kickoffs				
Name	No.	Yds	Avg	Long	TB	FC	I20	Blkd	No.	Yds	Avg	TB	OB
Spencer Lanning	22	932	42.4	52	5	2	5	0					
Ryan Succop									40	2743	68.6	15	0
Total	22	932	42.4	52	5	2	5	0	40	2743	68.6	15	0

Name	Punt returns					Kick returns				
Name	No.	Yds	Avg	TD	Long	No.	Yds	Avg	TD	Long
Captain Munnerlyn	15	105	7.0	0	35	3	106	35.3	0	84
Chris Culliver						19	438	23.1	0	50
Larry Freeman						1	24	24.0	0	24
Total										

== Coaching staff ==
- Steve Spurrier - Head Coach
- Ellis Johnson - Defensive Coordinator/Linebackers & Assistant Head Coach
- Shane Beamer - Cornerbacks
- Ron Cooper- Safeties
- Robert Gillespie- Running Backs
- John Hunt- Offensive Line
- Brad Lawing - Defensive Line
- David Reaves - Quarterbacks & Recruiting Coordinator
- Ray Rychleski - Special Teams
- Steve Spurrier, Jr. - Wide Receivers
