= Smelley =

Smelley is a surname. Notable people with the surname include:

- Brad Smelley (born 1989), American football player
- Chris Smelley (born 1986), American football and baseball player
- Jim Smelley Sr. (Born 1932) 82nd Airborne Ranger, USAF Veteran and Founder of 2 multimillion dollar corporations
- Jon Anthony ( Tony ) Smelley (born 1965), son of Jim Smelley Sr. - Founder and CEO of several multimillion dollar corporations in Alabama and South Carolina
- James Blake Smelley (Born 1969), retired US Naval Aviator flying SH-60B Seahawks and EA-6B Prowlers - former Maintenance Officer for VAQ-138

== See also ==
- Smelly (disambiguation)
- Smellie
- Smillie
