= 2008 Iowa Hawkeyes football team =

American college football season

2008 Iowa Hawkeyes football

Outback Bowl champion

Outback Bowl, W 31–10 vs. South Carolina
- Conference: Big Ten Conference

Ranking
- Coaches: No. 20
- AP: No. 20
- Record: 9–4 (5–3 Big Ten)
- Head coach: Kirk Ferentz (10th season)
- Offensive coordinator: Ken O'Keefe (10th season)
- Offensive scheme: Pro-style
- Defensive coordinator: Norm Parker (10th season)
- Base defense: 4–3
- Home stadium: Kinnick Stadium (Capacity: 70,585)

Uniform

2008 Big Ten Conference football standings
	Conf.			Overall
Team	W		L	W		L
No. 8 Penn State $+	7	–	1	11	–	2
No. 9 Ohio State %+	7	–	1	10	–	3
No. 24 Michigan State	6	–	2	9	–	4
Northwestern	5	–	3	9	–	4
No. 20 Iowa	5	–	3	9	–	4
Wisconsin	3	–	5	7	–	6
Minnesota	3	–	5	7	–	6
Illinois	3	–	5	5	–	7
Purdue	2	–	6	4	–	8
Michigan	2	–	6	3	–	9
Indiana	1	–	7	3	–	9
$ – BCS representative as conference champion; % – BCS at-large representative; + – Conference co-champions; Rankings from AP Poll

The 2008 Iowa Hawkeyes football team represented the University of Iowa and the Iowa Hawkeyes football program in the 2008 NCAA Division I FBS football season. Coached by Kirk Ferentz, the Hawkeyes played their seven home games in Kinnick Stadium.

== Leading up to the season ==
=== Previous season ===
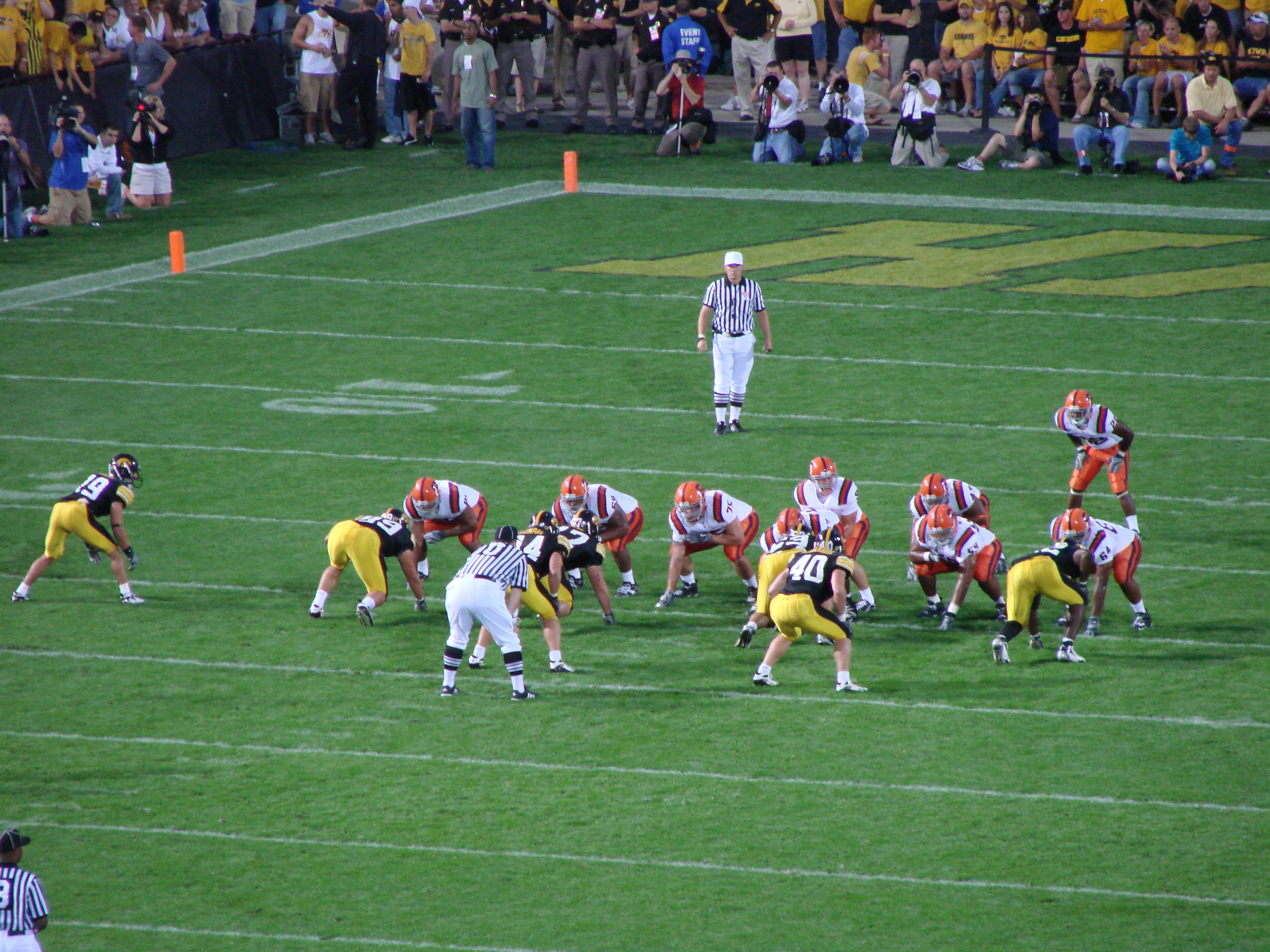
Iowa's defense lines up against the Syracuse Orange on September 8, 2007.

Iowa opened the 2007 season on September 1, 2007, against Northern Illinois in a game played at Soldier Field in Chicago, Illinois. Hawkeye running backs Albert Young and Damian Sims ran for 144 and 110 yards rushing respectively, while Iowa's defense held the Huskies to just 21 yards rushing. The Hawkeyes won, 16–3, and ended the four-game losing streak that comprised the final four games of Iowa's 2006 season. The next week, Iowa defeated Syracuse in the Hawkeyes' home opener, 35–0. Jake Christensen threw for 278 yards and four touchdowns as the Hawkeye defense held the Orange to just five first downs and 103 yards of total offense in Syracuse's worst defeat since a 51–14 loss to Georgia Tech in the 2004 Champs Sports Bowl. Iowa took a quick 28–0 lead with 9:55 left in the second quarter, and the Hawkeye defense sacked Syracuse six times while holding the Orange to 24 rushing yards. Following the first two games – which saw the Iowa defense give up only three points – the Hawkeyes traveled to Ames, Iowa, to play 0–2 Iowa State on September 15. The Cyclones began the season with losses to Kent State and Northern Iowa, but had won six out of the last nine games against the Hawkeyes, including three of the last four played at Jack Trice Stadium. Iowa fell behind by 12 at half-time, and lost, 15–13, starting yet another four-game losing streak. Placekicker Bret Culbertson scored all of Iowa State's points on five field goals, the last coming with one second remaining.

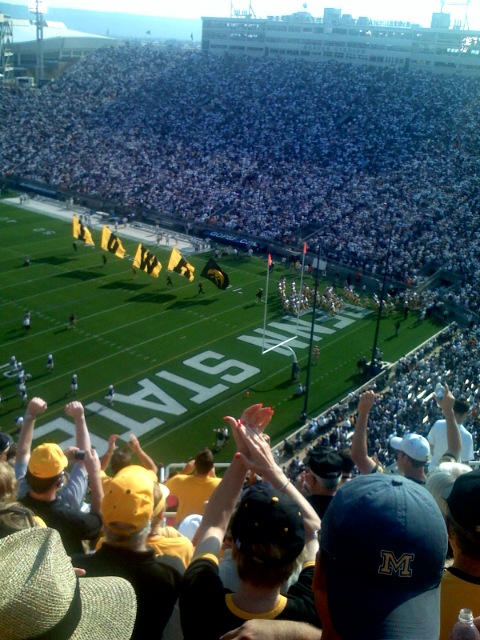
Iowa takes the field on October 6, 2007, against Penn State.

Following a 20-point loss at Penn State on October 6, which was preceded by losses to Wisconsin and Indiana, the Hawkeyes returned to Kinnick Stadium for a game against Illinois, who was coming into the game after home victories over Penn State and Wisconsin. Christensen threw for 182 yards and the game's only touchdown – a 20-yard pass to Brandon Myers in the third quarter which gave the Hawkeyes a 10–6 lead. However, it appeared that Illinois had taken a 12–10 lead on an 83-yard Eddie McGee touchdown pass midway through the fourth quarter, but it was called back due to a penalty. The Illini were forced to punt, but got the ball back with 2:28 remaining. McGee threw passes of 28 and 24 yards to Arrelious Benn, putting the Illini at the Iowa 12-yard line. However, Brett Greenwood intercepted a McGee pass at the goal-line, sealing the win and snapping an eight-game Big Ten losing streak for Iowa heading into a road game at Purdue. But Iowa lost to the Boilermakers a week later, 31–6, to put the Hawkeyes' record at 3–5 with only four games remaining. Curtis Painter threw for 315 yards and three touchdowns for Purdue, who had lost to the Hawkeyes, 47–17, only a year earlier. In Iowa's next game against Michigan State, the Hawkeyes entered half-time down by 14 points only to take a 20–17 lead with 10:05 remaining in regulation. The game was destined for overtime when Michigan State's Brett Swenson hit a field goal with four seconds remaining, and the Spartans quickly garnered a seven-point lead following a Jehuu Caulcrick touchdown in the first overtime. Down by a touchdown, Christensen found wide receiver Paul Chaney for a 23-yard touchdown pass and following the extra point, the game headed to double overtime. Iowa had the ball first and scored on a Jevon Pugh one-yard run, giving the Hawkeyes their own seven-point lead. However, the Spartans were unable to score and Iowa won, 34–27. The win was Iowa's first overtime victory in Kinnick Stadium history.

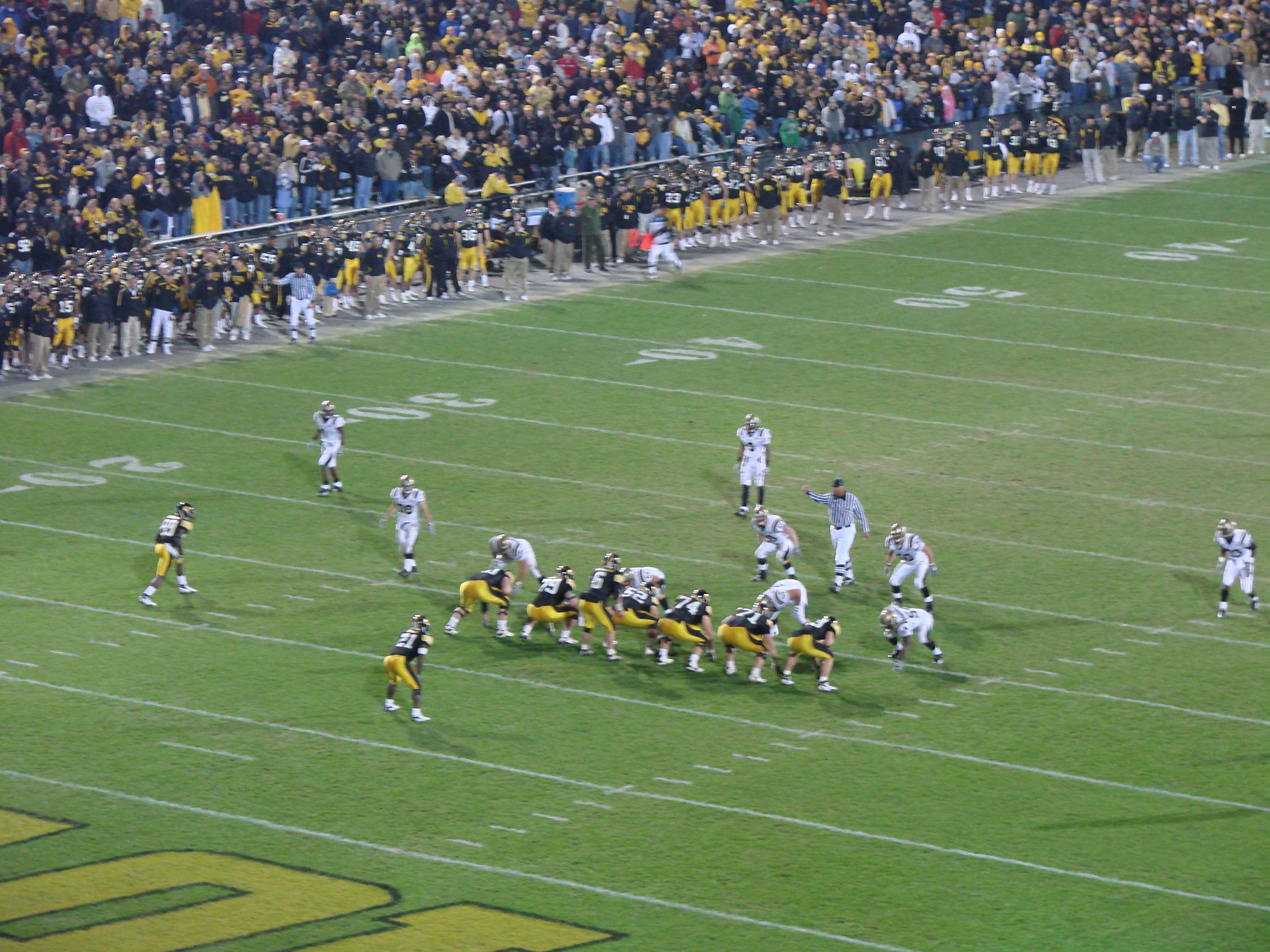
Iowa's offense sets up against Western Michigan's defense on November 17, 2007.

On November 3, Iowa defeated Northwestern, 28–17, after trailing, 14–0, in the first quarter. The Wildcats took a 17–14 on a third-quarter field goal after the Hawkeyes tied the game at 14, but Sims ran for two fourth-quarter touchdowns to seal the Iowa victory. Christensen threw for 299 yards for Iowa, who came back from a 14-point deficit in the second straight game. Later, on November 10, Iowa defeated Minnesota, 21–16, to reclaim the Floyd of Rosedale trophy. With one home game remaining against Western Michigan, Iowa held a three-game winning streak and a 6–5 overall record. But the Hawkeyes lost to the Broncos, 28–19, and gave up 489 yards in the process. Western Michigan took a 19–0 second quarter lead before Iowa scored 13 straight points to make it a six-point game. But the Hawks would get no closer and eventually lost by nine. Soon thereafter, Iowa was not selected for a bowl game, ending a six-year streak in which the Hawkeyes played in a bowl and rumors about the firing of Kirk Ferentz were rampant.

=== Coaching rumors ===
Following Michigan's loss to Appalachian State, rumors about the possibility of Ferentz becoming Michigan's head coach began to circulate. LSU coach Les Miles was widely believed to be Michigan's top choice for the job, LSU extended Miles' contract through 2012. Ferentz's relationship with Michigan president Mary Sue Coleman may have contributed to the rumor, as Coleman was the president at Iowa when Ferentz was hired. However, indications that the rumor was false were revealed when Iowa's sports information director, Phil Haddy, reported that Michigan had not asked for permission to talk with Ferentz. It was a point reiterated by Gary Barta, Iowa's athletic director. Ferentz's contract has a clause requiring him to contact Barta when talking to other schools, which indicates that he was not a candidate to become Michigan's next head coach. On December 16, West Virginia's Rich Rodriguez was hired as Carr's successor at Michigan.

Soon thereafter, Ferentz was once again rumored for a coaching job, this time for the Baltimore Ravens. Ferentz was an assistant head coach at Baltimore for six years, and became a "respected assistant" in his time there. However, when asked about the Baltimore job, Ferentz said, "I've got a great job here, and with that being said, I'm sure Baltimore will get a top-notch coach." Ferentz also cited wanting to see his son James – who is slated to be a freshman at Iowa in 2008 – play every weekend. The Ravens eventually hired Philadelphia Eagles secondary coach John Harbaugh on January 18, 2008.

=== Recruiting class ===
The Hawkeyes had 24 verbal commitments for the 2008 recruiting class. One of the players, Nate Guillory, is a junior college recruit. The other 23 players are all high school seniors. James Ferentz, Kirk's son, is among the players committed to play for Iowa in 2008.

== Schedule ==
The Hawkeyes opened the 2008 season with three home games against Maine, Florida International, and Iowa State, followed by a road game versus Pittsburgh. The game marked the first of four meetings between Pittsburgh and Iowa. The teams met in Iowa City in 2011 and 2015, and in Pittsburgh in 2016. Pitt closed the 2007 season with an upset victory over second-ranked West Virginia. Had the Mountaineers won, they would have likely played in the national championship game.

Following the conclusion of the non-conference portion of their schedule, the Hawkeyes began Big Ten play with a home game against Northwestern, and opened October with road games against Michigan State and Indiana. Iowa was 1–1 against the Spartans and Hoosiers in 2007, winning, 34–27, over MSU while losing, 38–20, to IU. Following the two road games, Iowa played at home against Wisconsin. Iowa lost, 17–13, to the Badgers in 2007. Following a bye week, the Hawkeyes played at Illinois, in what was Iowa's third road game in five weeks. However, Iowa followed this with two home games, against Penn State and Purdue. Iowa lost to both teams in 2007 by 20 points or more. A week following the Hawkeyes' final home game against Purdue, Iowa played Minnesota in the Gophers' home finale. Minnesota looked to take back the Floyd of Rosedale trophy a year after Iowa won it for the sixth time in seven years. The game was Minnesota's last at the Hubert H. Humphrey Metrodome, which took place on November 22, 2008. Minnesota began playing football at TCF Bank Stadium in 2009.

Two of Iowa's games – vs. Northwestern and at Michigan State – were scheduled for 11:00 AM starts. The season finale against Minnesota was set for a 6:00 p.m. start time.

Date	Time	Opponent	Site	TV	Result	Attendance
August 30	11:00 am	Maine*	Kinnick Stadium; Iowa City, IA	BTN	W 46–3	70,585
September 6	11:00 am	Florida International*	Kinnick Stadium; Iowa City, IA	BTN	W 42–0	70,585
September 13	11:00 am	Iowa State*	Kinnick Stadium; Iowa City, IA (Battle for the Cy-Hawk Trophy)	BTN	W 17–5	70,585
September 20	11:00 am	at Pittsburgh*	Heinz Field; Pittsburgh, PA	ESPN2	L 20–21	50,321
September 27	11:00 am	Northwestern^{†}	Kinnick Stadium; Iowa City, IA	ESPN Classic	L 17–22	70,585
October 4	11:00 am	at Michigan State	Spartan Stadium; East Lansing, MI	ESPN2	L 13–16	77,526
October 11	11:00 am	at Indiana	Memorial Stadium; Bloomington, IN	BTN	W 45–9	33,428
October 18	11:00 am	Wisconsin	Kinnick Stadium; Iowa City, IA (Battle for the Heartland Trophy)	BTN	W 38–16	70,585
November 1	2:30 pm	at Illinois	Memorial Stadium; Champaign, IL	ABC/ESPN	L 24–27	62,870
November 8	2:30 pm	No. 3 Penn State	Kinnick Stadium; Iowa City, IA	ABC/ESPN	W 24–23	70,585
November 15	11:00 am	Purdue	Kinnick Stadium; Iowa City, IA	BTN	W 22–17	67,676
November 22	6:00 pm	at Minnesota	Hubert H. Humphrey Metrodome; Minneapolis, MN (Battle for the Floyd of Rosedale)	BTN	W 55–0	64,071
January 1	10:00 am	vs. South Carolina*	Raymond James Stadium; Tampa, FL (Outback Bowl)	ESPN	W 31–10	55,117
*Non-conference game; ^{†}Homecoming; Rankings from AP Poll released prior to the game; All times are in Central time

== Personnel ==
=== Coaches ===
2008 Iowa Hawkeyes football coaches
Head coach – Kirk Ferentz; Strength and conditioning – Chris Doyle; Offensive coaches: Offensive Coordinator and Quarterbacks - Ken O'Keefe; Running backs and Special teams - Lester Erb; Wide receivers and tight ends - Erik Campbell; Offensive line – Reese Morgan; Recruiting and linebackers assistant - Eric Johnson; Defensive coaches: Defensive Coordinator and Linebackers - Norm Parker; Defensive backs – Phil Parker; Defensive line – Rick Kaczenski; Outside Linebackers and Special teams - Darrell Wilson; Source: HawkeyeSports.com

Kirk Ferentz will be in his tenth season as head coach at Iowa in 2008, and he has a 61–49 record entering the season. Ferentz came to Iowa in 1999, following an assistant coaching job for the Baltimore Ravens and a heading coaching job at Maine. Earlier in his career, Ferentz was an assistant coach under Hayden Fry at Iowa. From 1981 to 1989, Ferentz was Iowa's offensive line coach. From there, Ferentz took the heading coaching position at Maine, and followed that by taking an assistant position in Baltimore. He was named Iowa's 25th head football coach on December 2, 1998.

Norm Parker, Iowa's defensive coordinator, will also be in his tenth year at Iowa. The same can also be said for Ken O'Keefe, Iowa's offensive coordinator. Under Parker, Iowa's rushing defense has nationally ranked in the top 10 in three seasons. Parker has also coached several linebackers now playing in the NFL, including Chad Greenway, Abdul Hodge, and LeVar Woods. Before coming to Iowa, Parker coached 12 seasons at Michigan State, five at Minnesota, and three at Illinois. Under O'Keefe, Iowa has had the top scoring offense in the Big Ten twice, in 2001 and 2002, and 14 offensive players coached by O'Keefe have been drafted into the NFL. Before coaching at Iowa, O'Keefe was the head coach at Allegheny College, where he won a Division III national title in 1990. He was also head coach at Fordham University for one year before coming to Iowa.

=== Players ===
Returning for the Hawkeyes in 2008 are nine starters on offense, and as many as 18 total starters could be back for Iowa. Senior running back Young is gone, along with fellow running back Damian Sims and fullback Tom Busch. The rest of the offense, including the offensive line and wide receiver positions, are intact going into 2008. On the defense, up to seven starters may return, but the Hawkeyes lose linebackers Mike Klinkenborg and Mike Humpal along with defensive ends Kenny Iwebema and Bryan Mattison. Cornerbacks Adam Shada and Charles Godfrey are also done with their playing days at Iowa. Godfrey, who completed 2007 with five interceptions, was regarded as a possible third- to sixth-round draft pick in the 2008 NFL draft before being picked in the third-round. Another Iowa player, Devan Moylan, is seeking for another year after missing most of 2007 with an injury.

Returnees on offense include Jake Christensen, who succeeded Drew Tate at the quarterback position. Christensen threw for 2,269 yards and 17 touchdowns in his sophomore season, while throwing only six interceptions. Also returning are 11 true freshmen and 20 redshirt freshmen who saw playing time in 2007. With 31 total freshmen receiving playing time, the Hawkeyes ranked third in the country in that category, behind North Carolina and Florida, who played 38 and 33 freshmen respectively.

== Season ==
=== Maine ===
Maine at Iowa

Team	1	2	3	4	Total
Black Bears	0	3	0	0	3
• Hawkeyes	14	8	3	21	46

- Date: August 30
- Location: Kinnick Stadium
- Game start: 11:05 AM CST
- Elapsed time: 3:00
- Game attendance: 70,585
- Game weather: 76 °F (24 °C), Clear and Sunny, Wind S 5 mph (8.0 km/h)
- Referee: Dave Witvoet
- Television network: BTN
- Source: https://www.espn.com/college-football/matchup?gameId=282432294Archived 2019-07-05 at espn.com

Iowa controlled the home opener of their 2008 campaign with the defense holding Maine to one field goal in the second quarter. Running back duo Shonn Greene and Jewel Hampton combined for almost 200 yards rushing and three touchdowns as the Hawkeyes didn't have to go to the air often is this one-sided contest.

=== Florida International ===
FIU at Iowa

Team	1	2	3	4	Total
Golden Panthers	0	0	0	0	0
• Hawkeyes	21	14	0	7	42

- Date: September 6
- Location: Kinnick Stadium
- Game start: 11:05 AM CST
- Elapsed time: 2:42
- Game attendance: 70,585
- Game weather: 57 °F (14 °C), Cloudy, Wind WNW 6 mph (9.7 km/h)
- Referee: Mike Cannon

Iowa defeated Florida International in a shutout victory. Ricky Stanzi had three touchdowns on just 10 passing attempts and Shonn Greene added 130 yards rushing as the Panthers could not stop the Hawkeyes. The final score was the Hawkeyes 42, and the Golden Panthers of FIU held scoreless.

=== Iowa State ===
Iowa State at Iowa

Team	1	2	3	4	Total
Cyclones	0	0	3	2	5
• Hawkeyes	3	0	0	14	17

- Date: September 13
- Location: Kinnick Stadium
- Game start: 11:05 AM CST
- Game attendance: 70,585
- Game weather: 71 °F (22 °C), Cloudy, Wind SSW 10 mph (16 km/h)
- Television network: BTN

Iowa reclaimed the Cy-Hawk trophy in this low-scoring affair. Ricky Stanzi had trouble getting the Iowa offense going throughout the first half. Jake Christensen was brought in and led Iowa on a long drive that put them up 10–3 in the fourth quarter. The game's victor was still well in doubt until Andy Brodell returned a punt back 82 yards for a touchdown to put Iowa in control in the final minutes. With seconds left in the game Iowa kneeled down in the end zone resulting in a safety forcing Iowa State into a long drive that proved to be too much for the Cyclones to overcome.

=== at Pittsburgh ===
Iowa at Pittsburgh

Team	1	2	3	4	Total
Hawkeyes	3	7	7	3	20
• Panthers	7	7	0	7	21

- Date: September 20
- Location: Heinz Field
- Game start: 11:00 AM CST
- Game attendance: 50,321
- Game weather: 68 °F (20 °C), Partly Cloudy, Wind S 5 mph (8.0 km/h)
- TV announcers (ESPN2): Pam Ward, Ray Bentley

Iowa entered the game at Heinz Field now known as Acrisure Stadium, undefeated and the only FBS team remaining to not give up a touchdown in the 2008 season. Pittsburgh, despite losing their season home opener to Bowling Green, Pitt was led by future second round NFL Draft pick LeSean McCoy who had previously been selected First Team All-Big East and All-Big East rookie of the year in 2007. Pittsburgh had finished third in the Big East preseason media poll after spoiling West Virginia's national championship hopes the previous season. The Hawkeyes, still amid a quarterback battle between Christensen and Stanzi, decided to start and end the game with Christensen while rotating throughout the first half. Iowa struggled to defend quarterback draw plays and found themselves in a 14-3 hole with 12:34 left in the second quarter, despite holding McCoy to 18 rushing yards in the first half. Touchdowns from Shonn Greene, who rushed for a game-high 147 yards, and Christensen enabled Iowa to take a 17-14 late third-quarter lead. McCoy put the Panthers in front for good with a 27-yard fourth-quarter touchdown run. Trent Mossbrucker connected on a 39-yard field goal to get the Hawkeyes within a point, but both ensuing Iowa drives sputtered ending in a sack and a fumble, respectively, giving Pittsburgh the win.

=== Northwestern ===
Northwestern at Iowa

Team	1	2	3	4	Total
• Wildcats	0	10	6	6	22
Hawkeyes	3	14	0	0	17

- Date: September 27
- Location: Kinnick Stadium
- Game start: 11:00 AM CST
- Game attendance: 70,585
- Game weather: 72 °F (22 °C), Fair, Wind S 5 mph (8.0 km/h)
- TV announcers (ESPN Classic): Dave LaMont, Shaun King

Upstart Northwestern rolled into Kinnick Stadium off to their best start since 1962, having won their first four games of the year. Their strength of competition - Syracuse, Duke, FCS-level Southern Illinois and Ohio - was criticized though. The Wildcats were on the ropes early. Iowa, naming Stanzi as the starter after the previous week's loss to Pittsburgh, leapt to a 17–3 lead behind a Shonn Greene 18-yard touchdown run and a 45-yard touchdown catch by Andy Brodell. Northwestern tipped the score back in their favor with three straight passing touchdowns. Iowa had a final chance with 4:16 left in the game. Stanzi drove the offense to the Northwestern 8 but tossed four consecutive incompletions to seal the loss. Shonn Greene rushed for a career-high 159 yards on 21 carries but was sidelined for the Hawkeyes' final two drives from a fourth-quarter blow to the head while being tackled. The Hawkeyes suffered five turnovers and were held scoreless for the final 32:11 of the game.

=== at Michigan State ===
Iowa at Michigan State

Team	1	2	3	4	Total
Hawkeyes	0	3	3	7	13
• Spartans	7	3	6	0	16

- Date: October 4
- Location: Spartan Stadium
- Game start: 11:00 AM CST
- Game attendance: 77,526
- Game weather: 48 °F (9 °C), Fair, Wind Calm 0 mph (0 km/h)
- Television network: ESPN2

Losers of two straight games, Iowa limped into East Lansing against yet another formidable opponent. Michigan State opened the season with a road loss to California but recovered to win four games in a row. Media billed the game as a showdown between Shonn Greene and Spartans' eventual NFL fifth-round draft pick Javon Ringer, the nation's No. 6 and No. 2-ranked rushers at that point, respectively. Turnovers again plagued the Hawkeyes, as the Spartans forced three in the first half on their way to a 16-3 third-quarter lead. Iowa narrowed the margin to three points with a field goal and 31-yard Andy Brodell touchdown reception. With the ball on the Michigan State 21 and 2:16 left in the game, the Hawkeyes faced a fourth-and-1 situation. Rather than attempt a 38-yard game-tying field goal, Iowa head coach Kirk Ferentz elected to keep his offense on the field. Ricky Stanzi handed off to Greene, but the Spartan defense dropped him for a three-yard loss. Greene rushed for 157 yards on 30 carries in the heartbreaker. Ringer finished with 91 yards in Michigan State's fourth straight home win over Iowa. Ferentz acknowledged after the game if they would have run a play-action pass instead of a run on Greene's three-yard loss, they might have scored a touchdown.

=== at Indiana ===
Iowa at Indiana

Team	1	2	3	4	Total
• Hawkeyes	10	7	14	14	45
Hoosiers	3	6	0	0	9

- Date: October 11
- Location: Memorial Stadium
- Game start: 11:03 AM CST
- Game attendance: 33,428
- Game weather: 69 °F (21 °C), Cloudy, Wind ESE 6 mph (9.7 km/h)
- Television network: BTN

Iowa had lost the two previous entries in this series but had little difficulty in this outing. The Hawkeyes ran the ball at will and kept the Hoosiers from putting up any points in the second half.

=== Wisconsin ===
Wisconsin at Iowa

Team	1	2	3	4	Total
Badgers	0	3	6	7	16
• Hawkeyes	7	7	14	10	38

- Date: October 18
- Location: Kinnick Stadium

Shonn Greene had arguably the best game of his Doak Walker Award season as he rushed for 217 yards and four touchdowns with nearly nine yards per attempt. Wisconsin was utterly unable to slow him down and Iowa cruised to the win as they rarely had to go the air in this contest.

=== at Illinois ===
Iowa at Illinois

Team	1	2	3	4	Total
Hawkeyes	0	6	3	15	24
• Fighting Illini	7	3	7	10	27

- Date: November 1
- Location: Memorial Stadium

=== No. 3 Penn State ===
Penn State at Iowa

Team	1	2	3	4	Total
No. 3 Nittany Lions	3	10	10	0	23
• Hawkeyes	7	0	7	10	24

- Date: November 8
- Location: Kinnick Stadium
- Game start: 2:37 PM CST
- Elapsed time: 3:03
- Game attendance: 70,585
- Game weather: 38 °F (3 °C), Cold and Cloudy, Wind WNW 25 mph (40 km/h)
- Referee: Dan Capron
- TV announcers (ABC/ESPN): Brad Nessler, Bob Griese, Paul Maguire

Scoring summary
Q1	13:54	IOWA	Greene 14 yard run (Mossbrucker kick)	IOWA 7–0
Q1	4:11	PSU	Kelly 24 yard field goal	IOWA 7–3
Q2	12:32	PSU	Royster 2 yard run (Kelly kick)	PSU 10–7
Q2	0:55	PSU	Kelly 31 yard field goal	PSU 13–7
Q3	10:26	PSU	Kelly 25 yard field goal	PSU 16–7
Q3	4:43	IOWA	Johnson–Koulianos 27 yard pass from Stanzi (Mossbrucker kick)	PSU 16–14
Q3	0:29	PSU	Williams 9 yard run (Kelly kick)	PSU 23–14
Q4	9:20	IOWA	Greene 6 yard run (Mossbrucker kick)	PSU 23–21
Q4	0:01	IOWA	Murray 31 yard field goal	IOWA 24–23

Iowa got a much-needed win in this under-the-lights upset. Penn State came in heavily favored and was playing for a chance to reach the national championship. It was a back-and-forth affair that came down to a crucial kick. Daniel Murray nailed a 31-yard field goal to give the Hawkeyes the victory. Iowa did have to kick off again though as one second still remained on the clock but Penn State was unable to do anything as Iowa recovered the ball. It was a critical game for Ferentz and propelled them to a 13-game winning streak.

=== Purdue ===
Purdue at Iowa

Team	1	2	3	4	Total
Boilermakers	0	10	0	7	17
• Hawkeyes	6	6	3	7	22

- Date: November 15
- Location: Kinnick Stadium

=== at Minnesota ===
Iowa at Minnesota

Team	1	2	3	4	Total
• Hawkeyes	3	24	14	14	55
Golden Gophers	0	0	0	0	0

- Date: November 22
- Location: Hubert H. Humphrey Metrodome
- Game start: 6:03 p.m. CST
- Elapsed time: 3:15
- Game attendance: 64,071
- Game weather: Indoors
- Referee: Todd Geerlings
- TV announcers (BTN): Wayne Larrivee, Charles Davis, Anthony Herron

Scoring summary
Q1	7:10	IOWA	Murray 35 yard field goal	IOWA 3-0
Q2	12:50	IOWA	Murray 29 yard field goal	IOWA 6-0
Q2	9:57	IOWA	Greene 9 yard run (Mossbrucker kick)	IOWA 13-0
Q2	1:13	IOWA	Myers 3 yard pass from Stanzi (Mossbrucker kick)	IOWA 20-0
Q2	0:27	IOWA	Spievey 57 yard interception return (Mossbrucker kick)	IOWA 27-0
Q3	9:21	IOWA	Johnson-Koulianos 29 yard pass from Stanzi (Mossbrucker kick)	IOWA 34-0
Q3	4:58	IOWA	Greene 15 yard run (Mossbrucker kick)	IOWA 41-0
Q4	14:54	IOWA	Moeaki 13 yard pass from Stanzi (Mossbrucker kick)	IOWA 48-0
Q4	11:13	IOWA	Hampton 18 yard run (Mossbrucker kick)	IOWA 55-0

This was the final college football game at the Hubert H. Humphrey Metrodome. After a sluggish start in the first quarter Iowa dominated the rest of the way. The Hawkeyes shut out the Gophers and Iowa's offense was able to score at will. Shonn Greene became the all-time single season rushing leader with another great performance – 144 yards and 2 TD. Derrell Johnson-Koulianos hauled in 7 receptions for 181 yards and a touchdown.

=== vs. South Carolina (Outback Bowl) ===
South Carolina vs. Iowa

Team	1	2	3	4	Total
Gamecocks	0	0	0	10	10
• Hawkeyes	14	7	10	0	31

- Date: January 1
- Location: Raymond James Stadium
- Game start: 11:05 AM CST
- Elapsed time: 3:22
- Game attendance: 55,117
- Game weather: 65 °F (18 °C), Sunny, Wind ESE 13 mph (21 km/h)
- Referee: John McDaid
- TV announcers (ESPN): Sean McDonough, Chris Spielman, and Rob Stone

Scoring summary
Q1	7:39	IOWA	Trey Stross 6-yard pass from Ricky Stanzi (Murray kick)	Iowa 7–0
Q1	4:41	IOWA	Shonn Greene 1-yard run (Murray kick)	Iowa 14–0
Q2	8:09	IOWA	Shonn Greene 1-yard run (Murray kick)	Iowa 21–0
Q3	9:09	IOWA	Daniel Murray 18-yard field goal	Iowa 24–0
Q3	0:04	IOWA	Shonn Greene 11-yard run (Murray kick)	Iowa 31–0
Q4	13:35	SC	Jared Cook 10-yard pass from Chris Smelley (Succop kick)	Iowa 31–7
Q4	2:02	SC	Ryan Succop 48-yard field goal	Iowa 31–10

Shonn Greene was unstoppable in this Outback Bowl blowout as he rushed for 121 yards and three touchdowns. Iowa shutout South Carolina through the first three quarters and forced five turnovers as well.

== Statistics ==
=== Team ===
	Iowa	Opp
Scoring	394	169
Points per game	30.3	13.0
First downs	269	215
Rushing	146	68
Passing	108	129
Penalty	15	18
Total offense	4815	3787
Avg per play	5.8	4.4
Avg per game	370.4	291.3
Fumbles-Lost	20-13	17-9
Penalties-Yards	53-446	65-604
Avg per game	34.3	46.5

	Iowa	Opp
Punts-Yards	51-2088	76–3034;
Avg per punt	40.9	39.9
Time of possession/Game	31:31	28:29
3rd down conversions	65-159	67-194
4th down conversions	7-14	9-16
Touchdowns scored	48	17
Field goals-Attempts	19-24	17-23
PAT-Attempts	45-47	14-16
Attendance	491,186	288,216
Games/Avg per Game	70,169	57,643

==== Scores by quarter ====
	1	2	3	4	Total
Iowa	91	103	78	91	363
Opponents	27	55	38	49	169

=== Offense ===
==== Rushing ====
Name	GP-GS	Att	Yds	Avg	TDs	Long	Yds/G
Shonn Greene	13-13	308	1850	5.9	20	75	142.3
Jewel Hampton	11-0	89	450	5.01	7	22	40.9
Paki O'Meara	6-0	21	62	3.0	2	17	10.3
Jake Christensen	7-3	17	30	1.8	1	11	4.3
Andy Brodell	12-11	3	24	8.0	0	24	2.0
Ricky Stanzi	13-10	56	20	0.4	0	20	1.5
Jayme Murphy	2-0	7	7	1.0	0	4	3.5
Derrell Johnson-Koulianos	12-12	1	6	6.0	0	6	0.5
Trey Stross	10-10	1	4	1.0	0	4	0.4
Jared Oberland	2-0	3	2	0.7	0	5	1.0
Marvin McNutt	2-0	1	0	0.0	0	0	0.0
Total	13	508	2468	4.8	30	75	189.4
Opponents	13	397	1479	3.1	7	29	94.0

==== Passing ====
Name	GP-GS	Effic	Att-Cmp-Int	Pct	Yds	TD	Lng	Avg/G
Ricky Stanzi	13-10	134.8	254-150-9	59.1	1956	14	59	150.5
Jake Christensen	8-3	117.2	63-36-1	57.1	396	2	40	56.5
Marvin McNutt	2-0	-5.3	3-1-1	33.3	10	0	10	5.0
Total	13	82.3	320-187-11	58.4	2362	16	59	181.7
Opponents	13	98.3	463-256-23	55.3	1222	9	52	197.3

==== Receiving ====
Name	GP-GS	No.	Yds	Avg	TD	Long	Avg/G
Derrell Johnson-Koulianos	13-10	44	639	14.5	3	59	49.2
Andy Brodell	12-12	36	533	14.8	4	45	41.0
Brandon Myers	13-13	34	441	13.0	4	28	33.9
Allen Reisner	13-0	11	200	18.2	1	38	15.4
Tony Moeaki	9-1	13	144	11.1	1	48	16.0
Trey Stross	11-2	13	109	8.4	1	20	9.9
Colin Sandeman	13-0	6	76	12.7	2	25	5.8
Shonn Greene	13-13	8	49	6.1	0	23	3.8
Brett Morse	12-9	5	40	8.0	0	13	3.3
Paki O'Meara	10-0	3	33	11.0	0	20	3.3
Wade Leppert	11-4	5	22	4.4	0	8	2.0
Ben Evans	2-0	2	20	10.0	0	12	10.0
Paul Channey Jr.	5-0	2	19	9.5	0	11	3.8
DeMarco Paine	2-0	3	16	5.3	0	12	8.0
Marvin McNutt	3-0	1	11	11.0	0	11	3.7
Don Nordmann	1-0	1	10	10.0	0	10	10.0
Total	13	187	2362	12.6	16	59	181.7
Opponents	13	256	2565	10.0	9	52	197.3

=== Defense ===
Name	GP	Tackles				Sacks	Pass defense		Interceptions				Fumbles		Blkd Kick
Name	GP	Solo	Ast	Total	TFL-Yds	No-Yds	BrUp	QBH	No.-Yds	Avg	TD	Long	Rcv-Yds	FF	Blkd Kick
Pat Angerer	13-11	46	61	107	6.5-21	1.0-3	3	3	5-34	6.8	0	14	0-0	0	0
Total															

=== Special teams ===
Name	Punting								Kickoffs				
Name	No.	Yds	Avg	Long	TB	FC	I20	Blkd	No.	Yds	Avg	TB	OB
Total													

Name	Punt returns					Kick returns				
Name	No.	Yds	Avg	TD	Long	No.	Yds	Avg	TD	Long
Total										

== Postseason awards ==
- Shonn Greene - Winner of the Doak Walker Award, presented to the nation's top running back. Also received consensus first-team All-American honors and was named Big Ten Offensive Player of the Year.
- Mitch King - Named Big Ten Defensive Lineman of the Year

== Team players in the 2009 NFL draft ==
Player	Position	Round	Pick	NFL club
Shonn Greene	Running back	3	65	New York Jets
Bradley Fletcher	Cornerback	3	66	St. Louis Rams
Seth Olsen	Guard	4	132	Denver Broncos
Brandon Myers	Tight end	6	202	Oakland Raiders
