= Smiley (nickname) =

Smiley is a nickname of various notable people, including:

- Smiley (born 1980 as Tavis Nedd, now Tavis Scoot), Aruban-born reggae artist
- Smiley (born 1983), Romanian singer
- Smiley Adams (1935–2003), American trainer of Thoroughbred horses
- Simon Baker (born 1969), Australian actor (childhood nickname)
- Smiley Bates (1937–1997), Canadian country singer, songwriter, and musician
- Smiley Burnette (1911–1967), American country music performer and a comedic actor
- Warryn Campbell (born 1975), American record producer
- Smiley Creswell (born 1959), American professional gridiron football player
- Smiley Culture (1963–2011), British reggae singer and DJ
- Miley Cyrus (born 1992), American singer-songwriter and actress ("Miley" shortened from "Smiley")
- William (Smiley) Heather (born 1958), Cook Islands politician
- Smiley Lewis (1913–1966), American rhythm and blues singer and guitarist
- William Meronek (1917–1999), Canadian ice hockey player
- Smiley Quick (1909–1979), American professional golfer
- Arthur M. Ratliff (1924–2007), American teacher, author and businessman
- Eddie Turchin (1917–1982), American professional baseball infielder

== Fictional characters ==
- Nickname of an alternate universe Miles O'Brien in Star Trek: Deep Space Nine
- Smiley, a character in the Spike Lee film Do the Right Thing
- Smiley, a character in the anime television series Sherlock Hound

== See also ==
- Tim Keefe (1857–1933), American professional baseball player nicknamed "Smiling Tim"
- Smiley Face Killer (disambiguation), several people
- Guy Smiley, fictional character on Sesame Street
- Smilie Suri, Indian model
- Albert Smiley Williams (1849–1924), American politician in Tennessee
