= Smellie =

Smellie is a surname of Scottish origin, and may be pronounced "smiley". Smellie is the 191,485th most common surname in the world. It is borne by around 1 in 3,312,521 people. The surname Smellie occurs predominantly in The Americas, where 72 percent of Smellie live; 42 percent live in Caribbean and 42 percent live in Anglo-Caribbean. People with that name include:

- Alexander Smellie (1857–1923), Scottish minister
- Hon. Anthony Smellie (born 1952), Jamaican-born Chief Justice of the Cayman Islands
- Bob Smellie (1867–1951), Scottish footballer for Queen's Park and Scotland
- Elizabeth Lawrie Smellie (1884–1968), Canadian nurse
- Gavin Smellie (born 1986), Jamaican-born Canadian sprinter
- Hugh Smellie (1840–91), Scottish engineer
- Jean Smellie (1927–2020), British paediatrician
- Martin Smellie (1927–1988) Scottish biochemist
- Robert Smellie (1923–2005), Canadian politician
- Robert Smellie (footballer) (fl. 1890s), Scottish footballer for Sunderland and Walsall
- Thomas Smellie (politician) (1849–1925), Canadian doctor and politician
- Thomas Smellie (minister), Presbyterian minister and educator in South Australia in the 1860s
- William Smellie (encyclopedist) (1740–95), Scottish master printer, naturalist, antiquary, editor and encyclopedist
- William Smellie (geologist) (1885–1973) Scottish geologist
- William Smellie (obstetrician) (1697–1763), Scottish obstetrician

== Other uses ==
- Mauriceau–Smellie–Veit maneuver, an obstetric or emergent medical maneuver utilized in cases of breech delivery
- Point Smellie, a headland dominated by Smellie Hill in South Shetland Islands, Antarctica
- Smellie's Building, a heritage-listed warehouse in Brisbane, Queensland, Australia

== See also ==
- Smillie
- Smelley
