= Smelly =

Smelly may refer to something with a disagreeable odor (i.e., something that smells bad). Smelly may also refer to:

== People ==
- Smelly (performer) or Dai Okazaki, a Japanese comedic performer
- Erik Sandin, drummer with NOFX nicknamed Smelly

== See also ==
- Smelley, a surname
