= Smilie =

Smilie may refer to:

- Smilie Suri, an Indian model, actress and dancer
- John Smilie (1741–1812), Irish-American politician

== See also ==
- Smillie, a surname
- Emoticon
- Smiley-face drawing
- Smiley (disambiguation), including other roughly-face-like shapes, and people, places, etc.
