= Smiley Face =

Smiley Face or Smiley Faces may refer to:

- Smiley face, a stylized representation of a smiling humanoid face
- Smiley Face (film), a 2007 American film
- "The Smiley Face", a 2011 Curb Your Enthusiasm TV episode
- "Smiley Faces", a song by Gnarls Barkley
- "Smiley Face", a 2020 song by Duck Sauce

== See also ==
- Smiley face curve, a graphic equalizer adjustment with reduced midrange content
- Smiley face murder theory, a theory that drowning victims were instead murdered
- Smiley (disambiguation)
