= SMIL =

SMIL or Smil may refer to:

- SMIL (computer), a Swedish first-generation computer
- Synchronized Multimedia Integration Language, a www-standard markup language for multimedia presentations, including playlists and animated SVGs
- Vaclav Smil (born 1943), Czech-Canadian scientist and policy analyst
- smil.mil, an access to SIPRNet
- Izmail, a town in Ukraine sometimes known in Romanian as Smil
- Smil, or Samael, an archangel

== See also ==
- Smile (disambiguation)
