= Smiles (disambiguation) =

Smiles are facial expressions.

Smiles or SMILES may also refer to:

== Arts and entertainment ==
- "Smiles" (1917 song), from The Passing Show of 1918
- Smiles (film), a 1919 American silent film
- Smiles (musical), a 1930 Broadway musical with music by Vincent Youmans
- "Smiles" (Hitomi Shimatani song), 2009

== People ==
- Samuel Smiles (1812–1904), Scottish author and reformer
- Walter Smiles (1883–1953), British politician
- Patricia Ford née Smiles (1921–1995), British politician
- Tom Smiles (fl. 1929–1930), English footballer

== Other uses ==
- Smiles, slang for recreational drugs containing 2C-I or 25I-NBOMe
- Smiles S.A., a Brazilian company which manages Smiles loyalty program
- Simplified molecular-input line-entry system (SMILES), chemistry notation

== See also ==
- Smile (disambiguation)
