= The Smile =

The Smile may refer to:

- The Smile (band), an English rock band
- "The Smile" (Homeland), a 2012 episode of the series
- The Smile (film), a 1994 French drama
- The Smile (novel), by Donna Jo Napoli, 2008
- "The Smile", 1952 short story by Ray Bradbury

== See also ==
- Smile (disambiguation)
