= Smile (American TV series) =

2015 reality television series

- Genre: Reality television
- Country of origin: United States
- Original language: English
- No. of seasons: 1
- No. of episodes: 6

Production
- Executive producers: Dia Sokol Savage; Colleen Conway; Mary Donahue; Bryn Freedman; Morgan J. Freeman; Eli Lehrer
- Running time: 45 minutes
- Production company: 11th Street Productions

Original release
- Network: Lifetime
- Release: May 28 – June 26, 2015

Smile is an American reality television series broadcast by Lifetime. It premiered on May 28, 2015, while its sixth and final episode aired on June 26, 2015.

== Premise ==
Smile showed the process of giving people with "severe dental issues, causing problems with overall dental health and self-esteem," "transformative dental procedures."

It featured several high-profile dentists like Debra and Steven Glassman and Nicolas Ravon and Kimberly Knopf.

== Cast and controversy ==
One of the cast members, Brooke Allen, who got dental work done said she was left embarrassed, depressed, and nearly toothless after the show, saying the show promised that dentures were only temporary and once her bones healed, she would get implants, but the show shut down and implants never came.

== Episodes ==
No.	Title	Original release date
1	"Reconstruction or Relapse?"	May 28, 2015
2	"The Face of Fear"	June 4, 2015
3	"I'm a Witch"	June 11, 2015
4	"Camera Shy"	June 18, 2015
5	"Brush with Death"	June 26, 2015
6	"A Pregnant Pause"	June 26, 2016

== See also ==
- Social effects of television
