= Smiley (alligator) =

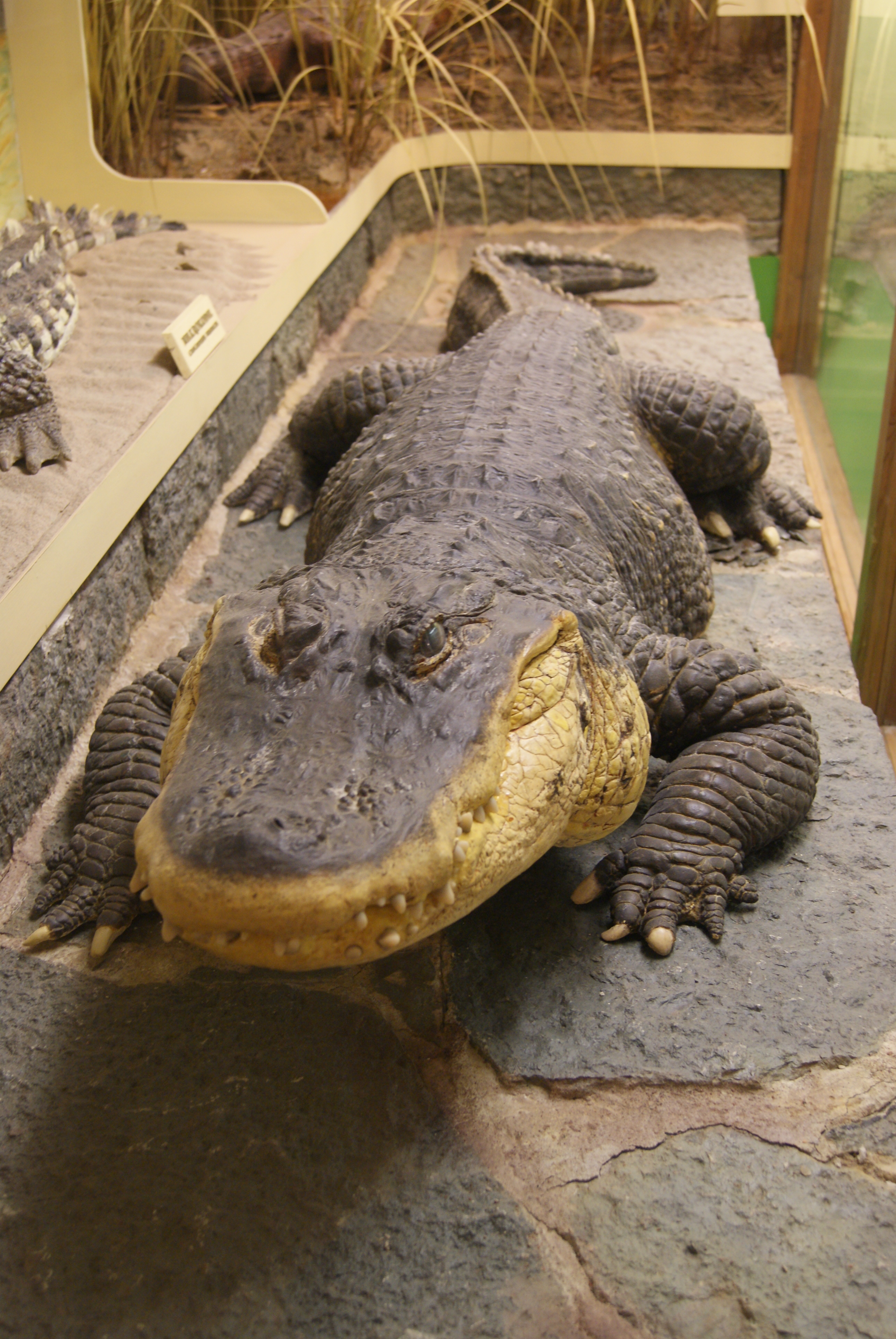
- Smiley can now be seen as a cast in Gothenburg, Sweden (2011)
- Species: Alligator mississippiensis (American alligator)
- Sex: Female

Smiley (Swedish: Smilet) was an American alligator (Alligator mississippiensis) that lived in captivity in the Maritime Museum of Gothenburg, Sweden. Smiley arrived in Gothenburg from the United States in 1924, at approximately the age of two, and died on 9 February 1987. She received the name "Smiley" in 1970 when the newspaper Expressen asked readers for appropriate names for the alligator. At the time of her death at the age of 65, she held the record of being the oldest living alligator in captivity, an honor that landed her a spot in the Guinness Book of World Records. (There are, however, records of alligators that have lived longer since her death.) At the time of her death Smiley weighed 75 kilograms (165 lb) and measured 265 centimetres (8.69 ft), which is small for North American alligators (males can grow to a length and weight double that). Only after her death and necropsy did doctors establish that Smiley was a female.

Smiley died after it was decided to turn down the heat in her pond to save money. As a result of the lower temperature, the alligator fell ill for two weeks.

In 1990, three years after Smiley's death, she was once again put on display, this time as a cast made by taxidermist Erling Haack for the Gothenburg Natural History Museum. The cast is made out of armored plaster painted with oil paint. The eyes were built with double lenses created by Hendén Optik AB. Smiley's physical remains are preserved in the museum's scientific collection, catalogued as number 17246.

Like many other celebrities who worked and lived in Gothenburg, Smiley has a tram named after her, the M29 859 tram.
