= Smiley (surname) =

Smiley is a surname which may refer to:

== People ==
- Albert Smiley Hoagland (1926–2022), American computer engineer
- Brett Smiley (singer) (1955–2016), American singer
- Brett Smiley (politician), American politician
- Charles Hugh Smiley (1903–1977), American astronomer
- Colonel David Smiley (1916–2009), British special forces and intelligence officer
- Forbes Smiley, (born 1956), American map thief
- Gordon Smiley (1946–1982), American race car driver
- Jane Smiley (born 1949), American author
- Janelle Smiley (born 1981), American ski mountaineer
- John Smiley (baseball) (born 1965), American baseball left-handed pitcher 1980s and '90s
- Joseph W. Smiley (1870–1945), American silent actor
- Justin Smiley (born 1981), American National Football League guard
- Michael Smiley (born 1963), Northern Irish actor and comedian
- Norman Smiley professional wrestler for World Championship Wrestling (1998–2001)
- Ryan Smiley (born 1995) Professional Ice Hockey Player
- Red Smiley (1925–1972), American singer in Reno and Smiley
- Rickey Smiley, comedian/actor
- Robert L. Smiley (1929–2010), American acarologist
- Tava Smiley (born 1971), American actress and television host
- Tavis Smiley (born 1964), American journalist
- Tom Smiley (1944–2012), American football player
- Thomas Smiley (c. 1660 – 1689), Williamite defender at the Siege of Derry

== Fictional characters ==
- George Smiley, spy in John le Carré novels
- Guy Smiley, on Sesame Street
- Jim Smiley, gambler in the Mark Twain story "The Celebrated Jumping Frog of Calaveras County"
