= Stanford Mobile Inquiry-based Learning Environment =

Educational technology project

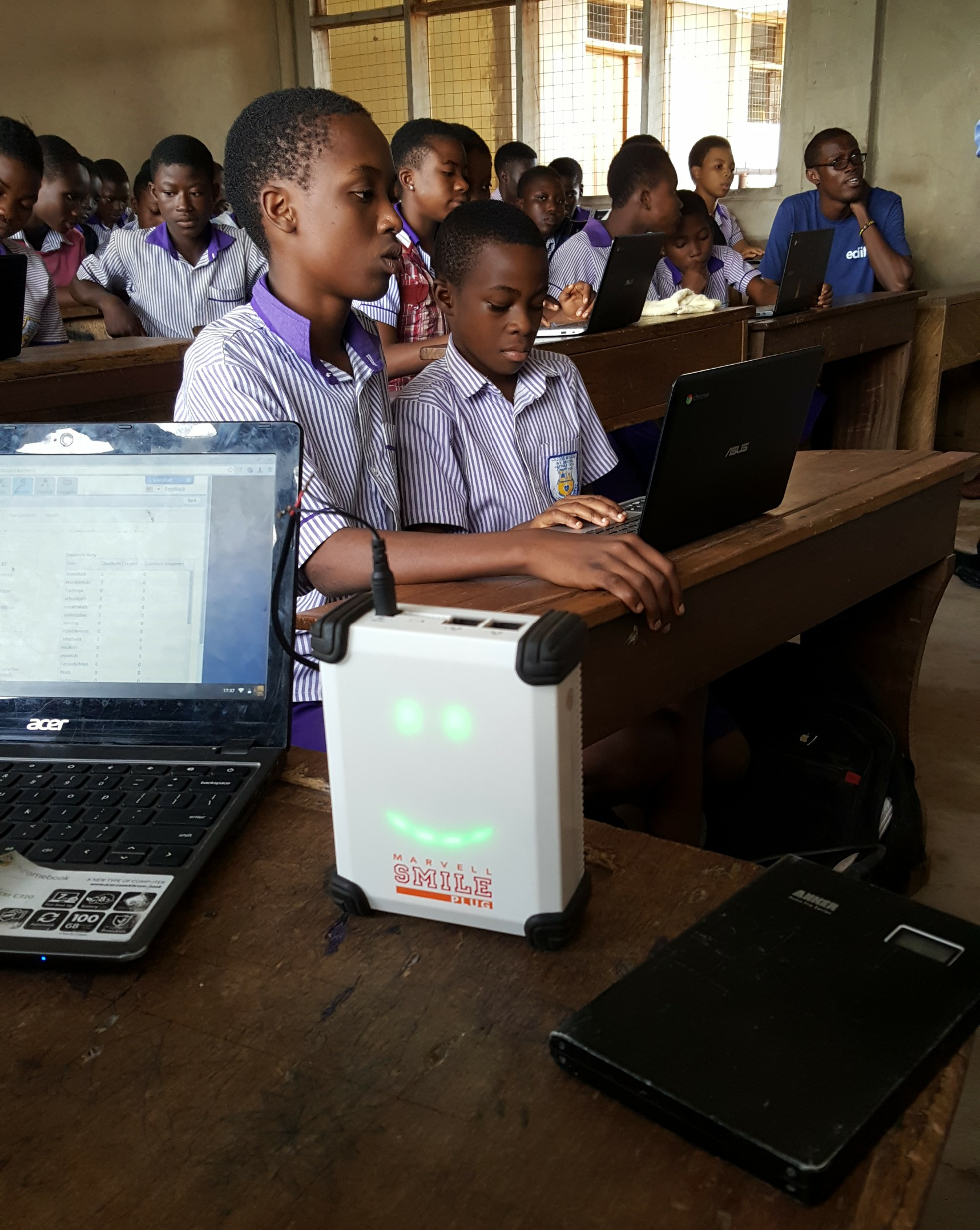
Students using the Stanford Mobile Inquiry-based Learning Environment in Ghana

Stanford Mobile Inquiry-based Learning Environment (SMILE) is a mobile learning management software and pedagogical model that introduces an innovative approach to students' education. It is designed to push higher-order learning skills such as applying, analyzing, evaluating, and creating. Instead of a passive, one-way lecture, SMILE engages students in an active learning process by encouraging them to ask, share, answer and evaluate their own questions. Teachers play more of the role of a “coach,” or “facilitator”. The software generates transparent real-time learning analytics so teachers can better understand each student's learning journey, and students acquire deeper insight regarding their own interests and skills. SMILE is valuable for aiding the learning process in remote, poverty-stricken, underserved countries, particularly for cases where teachers are scarce. SMILE was developed under the leadership of Dr. Paul Kim, Reuben Thiessen, and Wilson Wang.

The primary objective of SMILE is to enhance students’ questioning abilities and encourage greater student-centric practices in classrooms, and enable a low-cost mobile wireless learning environment.

== History ==
SMILE was first developed with the help of Seeds of Empowerment (Seeds), a global non-profit 501(c)(3) organization founded in 2009 by Dr. Paul Kim. Since 2009, the NGO has helped pilot studies test the software around the world, including in countries such as South Africa, United Arab Emirates, Ghana, and Tanzania.

Kim and his research assistants at Stanford University were the main contributors to the initial technical design of SMILE. The PocketSchool research study investigated a portable ad-hoc network solution that enabled a multi-user interactive learning environment in areas where resources such as electricity or access to the Internet is limited. This research was part of multiple projects affiliated with Stanford's interdisciplinary Programmable Open Mobile Internet supported by National Science Foundation.

SMILE was further developed by GSE-IT at the Graduate School of Education of Stanford University, and partnering organizations such as Edify. The license of trademarks, software, hardware, and technical design remains with the Office of Technology Licensing (OTL) at Stanford University.

SMILE has been listed as one of the most innovative tools for the schools of tomorrow by International Commission on Financing Global Education Opportunity, chaired by Gordon Brown, former Prime Minister of United Kingdom, in its 2016 report.

SMILE has been cited in discussions of global digital inclusion because of its emphasis on low-cost hardware, offline functionality, and context-sensitive design. The system’s ad-hoc networking capability allows classrooms without reliable electricity or broadband connectivity to participate in inquiry-based digital learning activities. This focus on accessibility aligns SMILE with broader initiatives aimed at expanding digital learning opportunities in underserved regions and contributes to ongoing debates about sustainable, equitable educational technology models.

== How it works ==
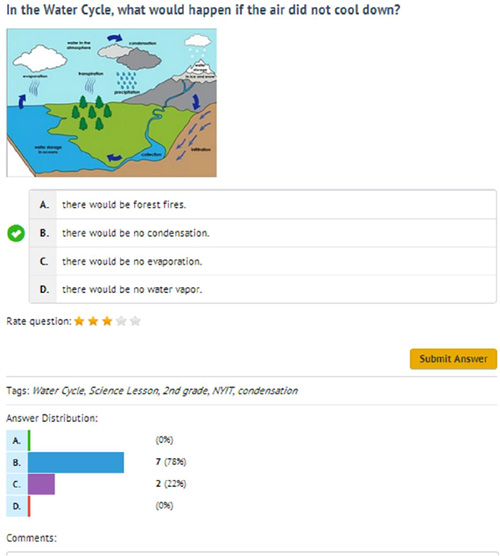
A sample question developed using SMILE

SMILE is composed of two main applications: a mobile-based question application for students, along with a management system for teachers. The software allows students to create open-ended or multiple-choice questions on mobile phones during class to share with their classmates and teachers.

The classroom management software allows students to share, respond, and rate questions on criteria such as creativity and depth of analysis. These applications can communicate via either a local network or the Internet. The local ad hoc network (SMILE Ad-hoc), shown in Fig. 1, was designed for developing regions without any type of network; the Internet version (SMILE Global) was designed for areas with mobile networks linked to the Internet. SMILE Ad-hoc enables students to engage in SMILE activities and exchange inquiries with peers in their classrooms or their own school. SMILE Global enables students around the world to exchange their inquiries regardless of their location. Both SMILE Ad-hoc and SMILE Global allow students to incorporate multimedia components in their questions: SMILE Ad-hoc uses images, and SMILE Global uses images, audio, and video.

Students are asked to submit their questions to the server management application, which then collects all the students’ questions and sends them back to the students' mobile-based application so that each student can answer his or her peers’ questions. Teachers can also enter questions to test information. While responding to their peers’ questions, students are also asked to rate the questions on a scale of 1(poor) - 5 (excellent). Teachers and students can also develop their own suitable standards for rating questions.

=== Question ratings ===
The instrument is designed to identify performance variations. It enables organizers to define five different levels of question quality. For example:

Question Difficulty	Description
Category 1	Students respond with minimum cognition involving simple recollections of learnt material or simple arithmetic calculations
Category 2	Students conduct a simple analysis on question types and qualities (e.g., asking questions about questions) or solve problems with simple reasoning. These questions are designed to assess if students can recognize and make distinctions between low quality questions and higher-order thinking questions.
Category 3	Students solve given problems with an intermediate level of cognition and analysis.
Category 4	Students solve given problems with a deeper level of analysis and reasoning.
Category 5	Students ignore distracting information and extract only accurate information to make a necessary inference. Students must formulate their own rational equation to arrive at a conclusion.

The data management software gathers these responses, records the time students take to respond, and saves this data for the teacher to analyze. Students are also able to view how everyone's question was rated and whether they answered questions correctly.

As facilitators of this system, teachers have the ability to choose the “mode of learning” which describes the different forms or activities of questioning that students engage in. The following is a list of the various operating modes.

=== Operating modes ===
SMILE has five operating modes. The facilitator chooses the mode for each activity.

Mode	Description (replaced description with what was on the smile website)
Exam Mode	In exam mode, only group organizers can create questions. Rating and commenting are disabled. The session remains closed (questions are not visible) until you enter solve mode. Results are hidden until shown.
Brainstorming Mode	A session in which participants can raise big questions to be shared, commented, and rated for further critical discussions. Leaders often ask the participants to come up with questions that reflect on changing trends, emerging technologies, or social phenomena that might have a significant influence on how we do business today and tomorrow.
Open to Closed-ended Mode	A quiz in which students first create open-ended questions, and then turn these questions into multiple-choice questions by adding answer choices. The students then answer and rate each other's questions. The organizer controls when students can create questions, and when they can answer questions.
Student-Paced Mode	A quiz in which students first create their own questions, and then answer and rate each other's questions. Students can create and answer questions at the same time.
Organizer-Paced Mode	A quiz in which students first create their own questions, and then answer and rate each other's questions. The organizer controls when students can create questions, and when they can answer questions.

Teachers can promote a classroom environment that is either collaborative, competitive, or both, depending on what they deem will motivate their students more. When creating questions in teams, the learning environment calls for collaboration. When ranking each team's questions, the activity turns into a competitive game. Additionally, generating multiple choice questions is a critical facet of this learning model because it leads students to do thorough research to find the right answer and distractors. Verifying that distractors are not feasible answers to the question also reinforces the student's learning of the material.

In lieu of test scores, the ratings of the questions can be used to assess learning outcomes. Analyzing a student's ability to rate other students' questions can be used to gauge critical thinking skills.

== Practice ==
Because it is content-agnostic, SMILE is intended for a wide range of educational settings. For example, some schools have successfully implemented SMILE into their curriculum. SMILE effectively utilizes mobiles and the "flipped" classroom.

The teacher has multiple features at his or her disposal. The Activity Flow window allows the teacher to activate the various stages of the activity. The Student Status window displays the current status of each student. The Scoreboard displays each student's responses. The Question Status window displays metadata about the question. The Question window displays the question itself and its predetermined correct answer. The Top Scorers window displays which student achieved the highest score and which question received the highest ratings. The Save Questions button allows the teacher to save data from a given exercise to the server.

=== SMILE in math classrooms ===
Math classes in Argentina and Indonesia have implemented SMILE as a learning model. In a typical setting, students go through several phases of learning. They are: Introduction and device exploration, Prompt for problems, Student grouping and generating questions, Question generation, Question solving, Result review, Reflection, and Repetition & enrichment. Song, Kim, and Karimi describe this in their 2012 paper, Inquiry-based Learning Environment Using Mobile Devices in Math Classroom. After familiarizing themselves with the mobile devices, students were asked to create challenging questions that “even their teachers would not be able to solve.” Students were also grouped in teams to generate questions where each member would attempt to also solve and verify their answers to their own questions. In addition to using their mobiles, students took pictures of supplementary figures or graphics that they drew to illustrate the question. At this time, facilitators would walk around to guide the students and help them discern what makes a good question. Afterwards, students solved their peers’ questions and rated them according to quality. Facilitators would monitor these activities in real-time and allow students to review the correct answer and student/group ranking of the questions. After reviewing, students were asked to explain their process of generating math questions and how they solved them.

=== SMILE in healthcare ===
A typical SMILE session involves participants making questions regarding healthcare topics most prevalent and of interest to themselves. Questions could include captured images from references, physical environments, or audios and videos of patients. SMILE then collects all inquiries to redistribute them for participants to answer. Once participants respond, they are asked to rank their peers’ questions and also present the rationale behind their own questions. Facilitators observe and analyze the quality of the questions according to relevancy and clarity. In the end, a review of correctly answered questions, average rating, and number of questions generated is shown.

== Technology ==
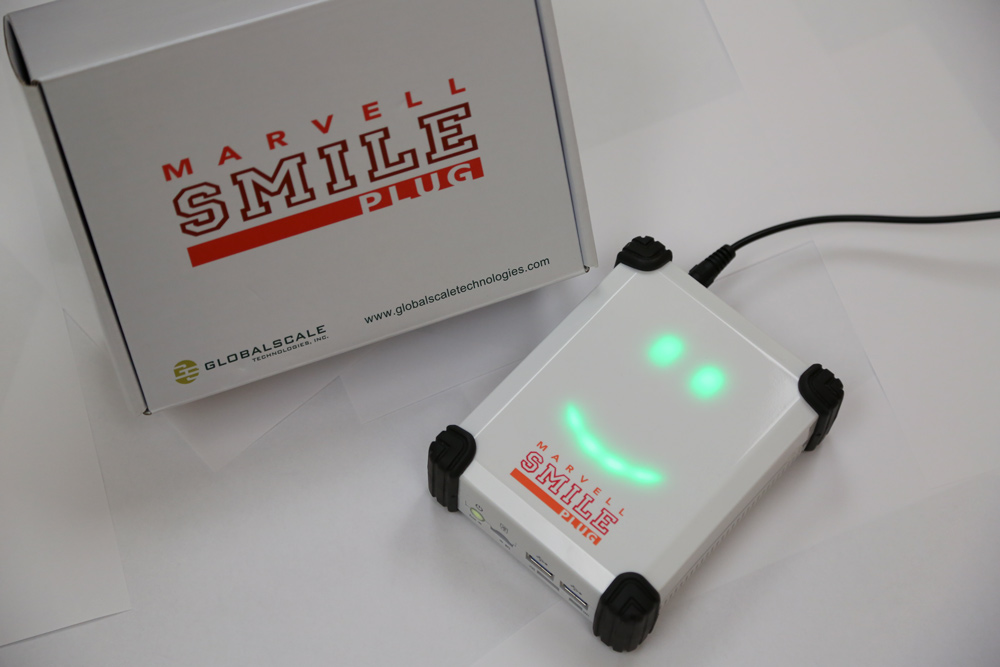
SMILE Plug on Marvell hardware

Participants in the SMILE Plug model must be physically present and connected to the ad-hoc SMILE WiFi network. A SMILE Plug router contains the SMILE server software, KIWIX, Khan Academy Lite, other various open education resources including open education textbooks, and four different coding language school programs.

SMILE Global enables students around the world to exchange their inquiries regardless of their location. People who are interested in a particular topic (e.g., for example, 'health') can search the keyword and also create their own questions, respond to existing questions, or comment on questions and answer. The SMILE Global server is accessible in the cloud.

=== Cost ===
The cost of implementing a SMILE activity depends on the infrastructure available at the school, but minimum costs are $80 per mobile phone (one for every 2-3 students), $300 for a notebook laptop computer, and $100 for a local router. Mobile devices provide a low-cost alternative to the traditional computer lab model.

In 2012, the SMILE team partnered with Marvell to create SMILE Consortium.

=== SMILE Plug on Raspberry Pi ===
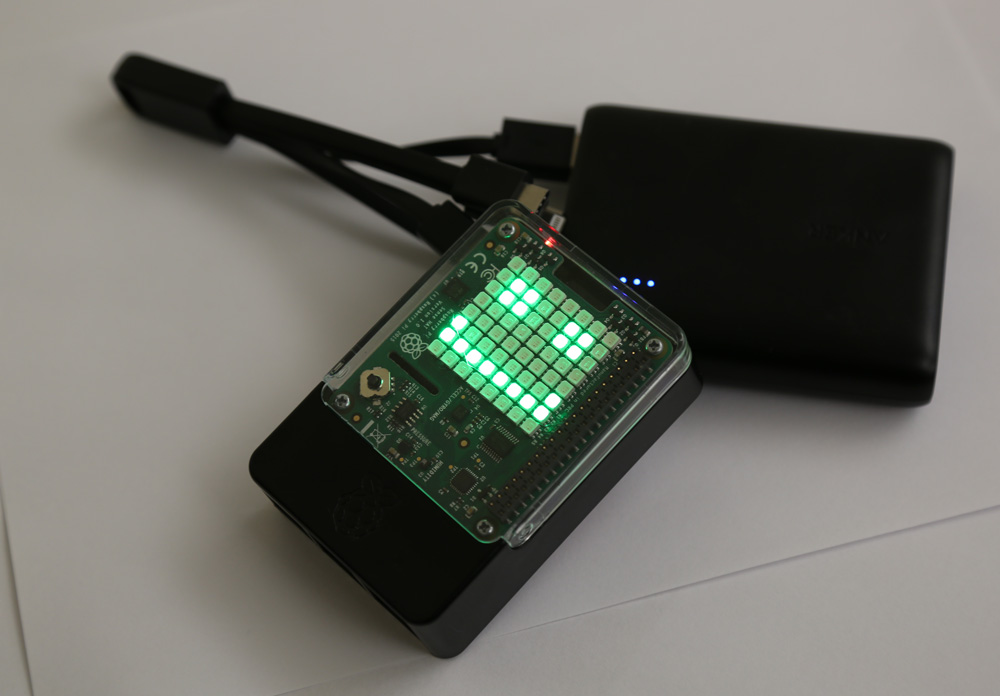
SMILE Plug on Raspberry Pi

In 2016, the SMILE Plug was implemented on a Raspberry Pi 3. SMILE will boot in one minute when plugged into USB power. In developing countries with limited access to electricity, a USB battery pack is required. The Pi, designed for use in areas of low internet connectivity, provides a local WiFi access point. The Plug requires a microSD card which acts as the hard drive and local repository of the offline resources. In order to update the SMILE Plug, one will swap out the previous microSD card with a newer microSD card with updated resources.

=== SMILE Global ===
In 2017, SMILE Global will interface with a natural language processing API. The SMILE team has prepared a databank of questions pre-categorized according to the question quality rubric. The API will return a rating for each question that is submitted on SMILE Global. The immediate response and feedback will give students a chance to make improvements to their questions in real time.

=== SMILE on Google Assistant ===
In 2021, SMILE was released on Google Assistant. It is composed of three main features: the Question Evaluator Quiz, the Recent News Feature, and the School Subjects Feature. The application enables students to actively engage in their learning by asking questions and its development is led by Wilson Wang and Rayan Malik.

The Question Evaluator Quiz helps students identify effective questions by asking them to rank open-ended questions using a pre-determined SMILE rubric based on Blooms’ Taxonomy. The quizzes are divided into different subjects, such as Economics or History, and students are required to rank 5 questions from their chosen subject from Level 1-5. Students and their teachers are provided a visual report after the quiz is completed that includes their overall score as well as personalized learning tools to help the student improve both their question analysis skills and conceptual understanding.

The Recent News Feature encourages students to actively read the news while teaching them how to ask insightful questions. Students are provided with 10 news articles about different topics from a variety of news sources. After reading all the articles, students select an article to complete the interactive exercise with. In the exercise, students are asked to create multiple questions using specific keywords from the article that they selected. The questions students create are ranked from Level 1-5 using artificial intelligence software and a visual report is created that provides a comprehensive overview of their performance in the interactive exercise.

The School Subjects Feature enables students to learn content from their curriculum via inquiry-based learning. Students select a topic from their curriculum, such as Government Intervention in Economics, and then ask questions about the topic using specific keywords. The questions students create are ranked from Level 1-5 using artificial intelligence software. This feature is still in development and is currently available for the British A-Level curriculum.

SMILE on Google Assistant is also currently being designed as a separate application for iOS and Android Devices.

=== Ask SMILE ===
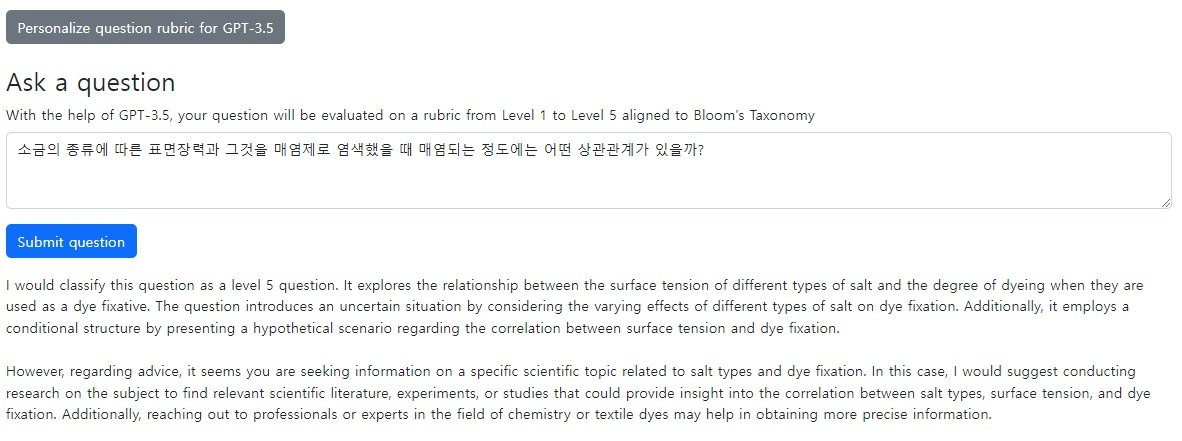
Example of Ask SMILE being used in Korean language

In 2023, with the release of GPT large language models, the ability to classify questions based on Bloom's Taxonomy became much easier with prompt engineering. A new platform, Ask SMILE, provides a space for students to ask questions. The questions are then rated by the language models.

=== SMILE LLM ===
In 2024, the Ask SMILE concept was adopted onto a Raspberry Pi 5, allowing for offline use of the SMILE LLM.

=== SMILE Coach ===
In 2024, as prompt engineering and generative AI became more robust, the SMILE Coach project began intended to help facilitate career counseling. The SMILE Coach provides personal career coaching, learning pathways, and reflection questions for learners from all ages.

== Projects ==
SMILE has reached over 25 countries, including the United States, India, Argentina, Mexico, Costa Rica, Colombia, Nepal, China, Uruguay, Indonesia, South Korea, South Africa, Sri Lanka, Pakistan, and Tanzania.

=== Argentina ===
In 2012, the Ministry of Education in Buenos Aires looked into modifying the cell phone prohibition use in the classroom that had been in effect since 2006. In addition to using SMILE, educators can now create executable programs on mobile devices to help facilitate learning in the classroom.

SMILE workshops on Music, Language Arts, and Mathematics were implemented in Misiones and Talarin in August 2011. By using an exploratory learning pedagogy, students were able to compose songs. The power of mobile devices to reach the last mile and the last school is most evident where electricity and internet access is not guaranteed.

=== Chile ===
Due to the centralized nature of Chile, it is harder for education to reach the poorest areas of the country. The concept of a mobile classroom, or "pocket school," connected and tied together by a network of mobile phones, is an attempt to take advantage of the resources already available in the most underserved communities.

=== Indonesia ===
Students were asked to generate math questions covering a wide range of topics, from triangle-angle sum theorem, to fractions, areas, and diameters.

=== South Korea ===
SMILE Global was tested with medical students at Chungbuk National University. Criteria for high-quality questions, criteria rubrics, and examples of high- and low-quality questions were discussed with students first. As the students were already very experienced in using technology, they spent 60% of their time on the inquiry-making task.

=== United Arab Emirates ===
SMILE Global was tested with fifty-four KG2 students in August 2020 during a study led by Rayan S. Malik in Dubai. Students were introduced to SMILE Global via workshops and spent seven weeks learning content by interacting with SMILE Global. Five different learning outcomes, including critical thinking and conceptual understanding skills, were quantified to examine the impact of SMILE Global on students' learning outcomes. The study found that while SMILE Global had no statistical effect on students' conceptual understanding, it significantly improved their question analysis skills and confidence.

== Findings ==
The pre-service teachers reported that SMILE makes student thinking visible. Younger students are better at creating higher-quality questions. Older students are already used to the traditional learning model where fact-recall is the major theme of classroom activities.

— Quote from "Preservice teachers’ uses of SMILE to enact student-generated questioning practices"

Teachers need an initial training period and some follow-up mentoring so they can facilitate questions. Tailoring the content of the training to the local environment is crucial. Without putting the benefits of SMILE into the local context, teachers and students will find no compelling reason to adopt the pedagogy.

SMILE worked best when officials, along with civil society organizations, universities, and local businesses, worked together to bring the software to classrooms.

=== Cohesiveness of Integration ===
The most important lesson here is that the process of developing critical thinking skills is probably not too different from the process of language acquisition: It takes time and good guidance along with ample exposure.

— Quote from "Using Technology to Teach the Art of Asking Questions"

The success rate of implementing SMILE is dependent on how cohesively an inquiry-based pedagogy is tied to the curriculum taught at a school. While SMILE can be implemented with the existing curriculum (for example, with students asking simple recall math questions), it is most effective as an additional platform to foster critical thinking. Higher teacher motivation, better classroom integration, and higher frequency of use are three factors that increase SMILE retention.

=== Challenges ===
Cultural norms governing relations between adults and students and situational authority roles may inhibit student questioning.

SMILE was more difficult to implement in areas where rote memorization pedagogies were typical teaching methodologies. Some students found it hard to generate their own questions, given their previous classroom experiences with rote memorization activities.

Additionally, students with little experience using smartphones took longer to understand and use the technology. Eventually, however, they adjusted after exploration.
