= Smiley Face Killer =

Smiley face killer may refer to:

- Keith Hunter Jesperson (born 1955), serial killer who used the smiley face symbol on his letters to the police and prosecutors
- Robert Lee Yates (born 1952), serial killer who used plastic bags with a smiley face printed on them to cover the heads of his victims
- Smiley face murder theory, a theory about smiley faces near the bodies of young men killed by drowning between 1992 and 2018
- Smiley Face Killers (film), a 2020 American slasher film

== See also ==
- Red John#Smiley face and other signatures
