= Smiley, Virginia =

Unincorporated community in Virginia, United States

- Unincorporated community
- Location within Virginia Location within the United States
- Coordinates: 36°41′33″N 83°17′15″W
- Country: United States
- State: Virginia
- County: Lee
- Elevation: 1,368 ft (417 m)
- Time zone: UTC−5 (Eastern (EST))
  - Summer (DST): UTC−4 (EDT)
- GNIS feature ID: 1500123

Smiley is an unincorporated community in Lee County, Virginia, United States.
