= Smile (actress) =

- စမိုင်းလ်
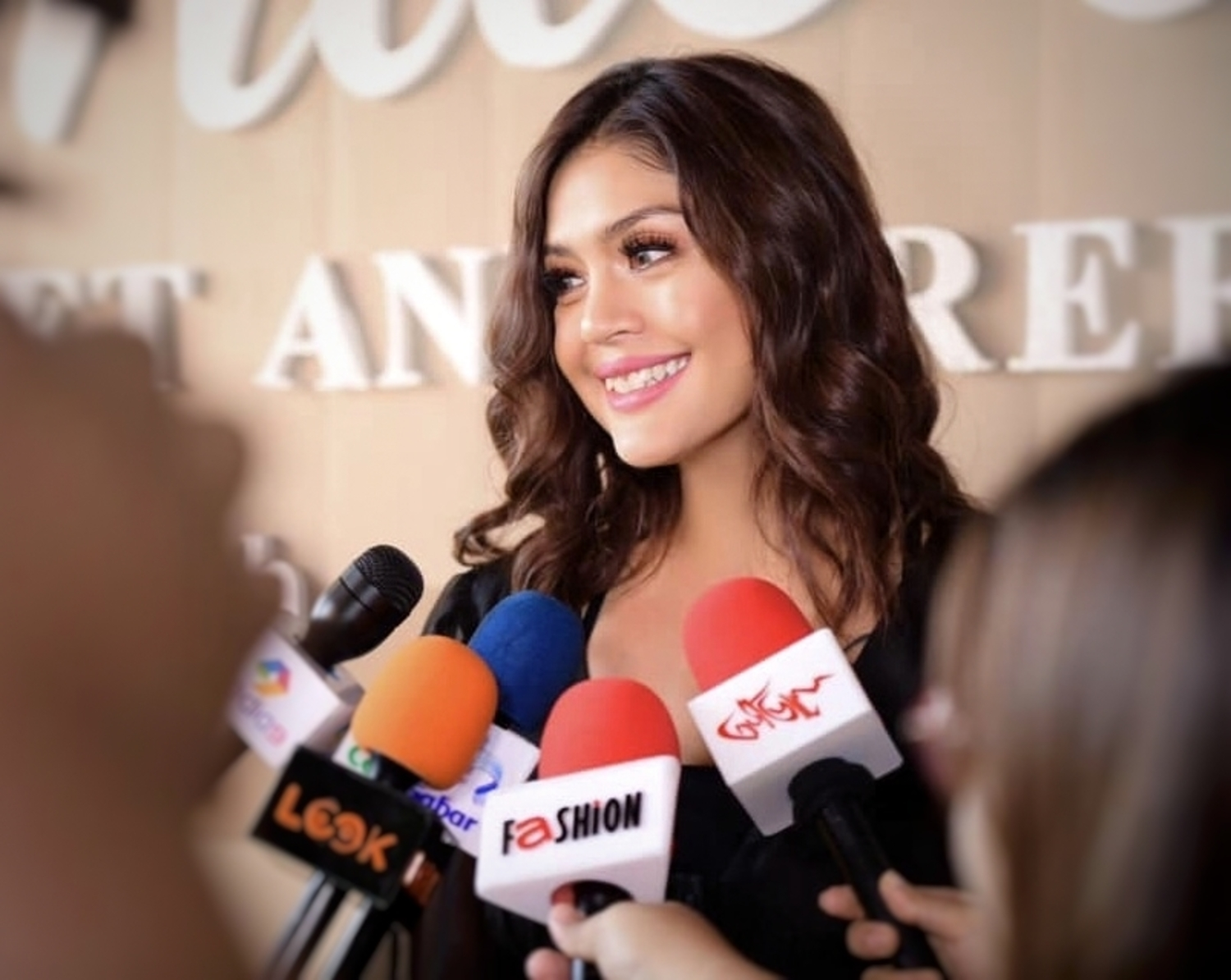
- Smile in 2019
- Born: Than Thar Htoo; 22 June 1986 (age 40); Rangoon, Burma
- Other name: Smile Maung
- Education: Uxbridge College
- Occupations: Actress, model, singer, writer, businesswoman
- Years active: 1998–present
- Height: 5 ft 6 in (1.68 m)
- Musical career
- Genres: Pop rock
- Instrument: Vocals
- Years active: 2012–present

Smile (Burmese: စမိုင်းလ်; born Than Thar Htoo on 22 June 1986), also known as Smile Maung, is a Burmese actress, singer, former model, writer and businesswoman. She was one of the most popular model in Myanmar during the 2000s. Throughout her career, she has acted in over 50 films.

== Early life and education ==
Smile was born on 22 June 1986 in Yangon, Myanmar into a film production family. She is the granddaughter of famous Myanmar actress Khin Lay Swe. She is the youngest daughter of two siblings, having an elder sister. She went to study in London at Uxbridge College.

== Career ==
Smile began her modeling career in 1998 at the age of 12. She appeared on magazine covers and worked as a commercial model, which drew attention from the film industry. Her work in modeling and commercial acting led to roles in TV commercials and DVD productions. By the age of 16, she had transitioned to acting, making her film debut in A Chit The Laypyay (Love is Breeze), where she starred alongside Dwe and Eaindra Kyaw Zin.

In 2002, she starred in the big-screen film Kyar Mee Swal Ko Ko Myauk Muu Lae Ma Ma, where she played the main role with Wai Lu Kyaw and Nandar Hlaing. After relocating to England in 2003, she made a conscious decision to step away from her film career following her marriage and the arrival of her children. As a result, she completely withdrew from the industry.

After a decade-long absence from the public eye, Smile made a comeback in 2012, embarking on a music career. On October 15, 2013, she successfully launched her debut solo album titled "New Me", marking a significant milestone in her music career. In 2017, she starred in 4 films, including Gayat Tway Par Hal.

On February 10, 2019, she published her biography book titled "Sharing Is Caring", which delves into the topics of body shaming and fitness. From 2000 to present, she has acted in more than 50 video/films.

== Personal life ==
Smile married Pyae Maung, a golfer who played for the Myanmar National Golf Team. Their careers evolved from the arts and sports to the telecom industry in 2006 with what started as a calling card business based in London. In 2012, they founded VMG Telecoms and launched VoIP application Ytalk. Under the names of Smile Empire and Smile Online Cinema, their businesses have evolved to the realms of digital content partnerships, mobile payment apps, entertainment, gaming, and hospitality.

Smile also owns Smile Hotel in Pyin Oo Lwin, and Smile Mart in Yangon. However, their main business source is unknown.

In August 2022, the couple purchased a mansion owned by American YouTuber Jeffree Star, which was worth US$16.7 million.

They have two daughters, Su Nadi Maung and Su Yati Maung. Her eldest daughter, Su Nadi Maung (Portia) is a model.

== Political activities ==
Smile joined the campaign supporting Aung San Suu Kyi's defense of Myanmar against genocide charges related to the Rohingya crisis at the UN's top court in The Hague in December 2019.

In the aftermath of the 2021 Myanmar coup d'état, she participated in the early anti-junta movements and protests. She donated 100,000 Kyat to each of the ten protesters who fell during the crackdown on anti-junta movements in Mandalay.

On 14 March 2021, Smile faced accusations from an anti-junta group of being involved in arms trafficking for the military junta, leading to a boycott call against her. However, she denied all the accusations, humorously clarifying that she only had a "mango gun" (a traditional food). She added, "If I made a profit from selling weapons and drugs that can kill others, may everything I eat turn to poison and lead to my death".

On 10 February 2021, she donated all the food from her Smile Mart to the protesters on the streets. She donated snacks carried by a car full to the anti-junta protestors in Yangon. She also donated helmets, goggles, and fire extinguishers to the protesters on the frontline.

== Philanthropy ==
Smile founded PSPC Foundation in California. She became a board member of the White Ribbon USA, a non-profit organization that she regularly donates to. She faced severe criticism for donating 5,000,000 Kyat (equivalent to USD 1,050) to the Myitkyina flood in July 2024, while simultaneously donating $10,000 to the LGBT community in the United States. This sparked anger among the residents of Myitkyina, who requested a refund of the donation, stating they did not want her money. Later, Smile posted on her Facebook page expressing anger over the criticism of her donation and stated that she will never donate to Myanmar again.

== Filmography ==
=== Film (Cinema) ===
- A Chit The Lay Pyay (အချစ်သည်လေပြေ) (2002)
- Kyar Mee Swal Ko Ko Myauk Muu Lae Ma Ma (ကျားမှီးဆွဲကိုကို မျောက်မူးလဲမမ) (2002)
- Gayat Tway Par Hal (ဂယက်တွေပါဟယ်) (2017)

=== Film ===
(Over 50 films)

== Discography ==
=== Solo albums ===
- New Me (2013)

== Books ==
- Sharing Is Caring (2019)
