= Smillie =

Smillie is a surname.

It may refer to:

- Andy Smillie (born 1941), English footballer
- Carol Smillie (born 1961), Scottish television presenter, actress and model
- Don Smillie (1910–1993), Canadian ice hockey player
- George Henry Smillie (1840–1921), American landscape painter; brother of James David
- George Frederick Cumming Smillie (1854–1924), United States engraver
- Grant Smillie (born 1977), Australian music producer and DJ
- Helen Sheldon Jacobs Smillie (1854–1926), American painter
- James "Jim" Smillie, (born 1944), British–Australian film and theatre actor
- James David Smillie (1833–1909), American painter and engraver; brother of George Henry
- Jennie Smillie Robertson (1878–1981), Canadian surgeon
- John Smillie (mathematician) (born 1953), American mathematician
- John Smillie (soccer) (born 1954), Scottish–American soccer player
- Josh Smillie (born 2006), Australian rules footballer
- Neil Smillie (born 1958), English footballer and manager
- Octavia Hall Smillie (1889–1970), American dietitian
- Raymond Smillie (1904–1993), Canadian boxer and Olympian
- Robert Smillie (1857–1940), British trade unionist and Labour Party politician
- Ron Smillie (1933–2005), English footballer
- Ryan Smillie (born 1992), Scottish footballer
- Thomas Smillie (1843 –1917), Scottish–American photographer and archivist
- Tuesday Smillie (born 1981), American interdisciplinary artist
- William Smillie (1810–1852), South Australian advocate-general and politician

== See also ==
- Smellie, a list of people with the surname
- Smelley, a list of people with the surname
- Smiley (disambiguation)
