= Chris Smelley =

American football and baseball player (born 1986)

No. 7
- Position: Quarterback

Personal information
- Born: September 29, 1986 (age 40)
- Listed height: 6 ft 2 in (1.88 m)
- Listed weight: 221 lb (100 kg)

Career information
- High school: American Christian Academy (Tuscaloosa, Alabama)
- College: South Carolina Gamecocks (2006–2008)
- Stats at ESPN

Other information
- Baseball career

Alabama Crimson Tide – No. 22
- Catcher

NCAA Division I debut
- 2010, for the Alabama Crimson Tide

Last appearance
- 2010, for the Alabama Crimson Tide
- Stats at Baseball Reference

Christopher Smelley (born September 29, 1986) is an American football and baseball player. He is a former starting quarterback for the University of South Carolina, as well as a former catcher for the University of Alabama.

== High school ==
In his high school football career, Smelley set Alabama High School Athletic Association records for yards in a single game (585) and season (4,120). He also set Alabama High School Athletic Association (AHSAA) records for touchdown passes in a season (59) and career (134).

While attending American Christian Academy in Tuscaloosa, the 6'2", 221 lb Smelley played on three state championship baseball teams and was the Class 1A Player of the Year for 2005, but chose to pursue college football over college baseball.

On February 1, 2006, Smelley signed a national letter of intent to play football at the University of South Carolina. He was listed as a top-rated football prospect on ESPN.com's "Class of 2006".

== College career ==
=== University of South Carolina ===
He arrived at South Carolina in 2006 and made two appearances in a backup role for the South Carolina Gamecocks. In the first two games of the 2006 season, he completed 9 of 15 passes for 112 yards. He suffered a heel injury during a practice and was granted a medical redshirt.

In 2007, after his return from injury, he took over the starting position after replacing ineffective starter Blake Mitchell against LSU. Steve Spurrier announced that Smelley would start against Mississippi State University on September 29, 2007, a game which earned him SEC Freshman of the week honors.

In 2008, Smelley was the second string quarterback behind Tommy Beecher. Beecher later suffered a concussion in the second half of the first game of the season after throwing four interceptions. Smelley entered the game and completed five passes on five attempts, also throwing for two touchdown passes. He was then named as the starter for the next game against the Vanderbilt Commodores. Later that year, he completed 22 of 32 passes, threw for 327 yards and three touchdowns during a win against Ole Miss. For his performance he was named the SEC Offensive Player of the Week.

He was 9–6 in 15 career starts. For his career, Smelley completed 56.4 percent of his passes for 3,210 yards and 23 touchdowns with 22 interceptions. He ranks in the top 10 on USC's all-time list in completions (270), attempts (479), completion percentage and passing touchdowns (22).

=== University of Alabama ===
On January 9, 2009, Smelley declared that he would be transferring from the University of South Carolina to go play baseball (and possibly football) at the University of Alabama. Due to NCAA transfer rules, he had to sit out the spring semester, though he was still able to practice with the team.

== Personal ==
His brother is Brad Smelley, a former football player for the Alabama Crimson Tide, Cleveland Browns, and the Houston Texans.

=== Coaching career ===
Chris Smelley was hired as head football coach at American Christian Academy in Tuscaloosa, Alabama on January 9, 2014. On August 3, 2021, he resigned, citing personal reasons.
