= 2010 New York Jets season =

2010 season of NFL team New York Jets; last playoff berth

- Owner: Woody & Christopher Johnson
- General manager: Mike Tannenbaum
- Head coach: Rex Ryan
- Offensive coordinator: Brian Schottenheimer
- Defensive coordinator: Mike Pettine
- Home stadium: New Meadowlands Stadium

Results
- Record: 11–5
- Division place: 2nd AFC East
- Playoffs: Won Wild Card Playoffs (at Colts) 17–16; Won Divisional Playoffs (at Patriots) 28–21; Lost AFC Championship (at Steelers) 19–24
- Pro Bowlers: OT D'Brickashaw Ferguson; C Nick Mangold; CB Darrelle Revis

Uniform
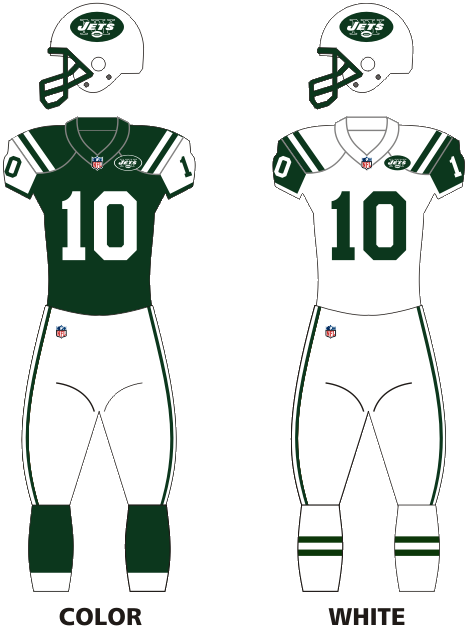

The 2010 season was the New York Jets' 41st season in the National Football League (NFL), their 51st overall and their first at New Meadowlands Stadium. The team improved on their 9–7 record from 2009, going 11–5 to reach the playoffs again as the AFC East's second-placed team. The Jets were the subject of HBO's training camp series Hard Knocks. The Jets played their first pre-season home game against the New York Giants to open up MetLife Stadium. Many considered them AFC East favorites; head coach Rex Ryan went so far as to guarantee a Super Bowl victory. The Jets broke a team record with a franchise best 6 consecutive wins on the road with a win against the Lions, followed by a win against the Browns in week 10. In the same victory against the Browns, the Jets became the first team in NFL history to win back-to-back road games in overtime. The Jets were the last NFL team to be undefeated on the road, before suffering a 45–3 loss at the New England Patriots in Week 13. The Jets met the Patriots again five weeks later in the AFC Divisional Round back in Foxborough where New York upset New England 28–21.

The following week, they were defeated by a final score of 24–19 against the Pittsburgh Steelers in the AFC Championship Game, ending their hopes of returning to the Super Bowl for the first time in 42 seasons.

This is the first time the Jets made the postseason in back-to-back seasons since their 2001 and 2002 seasons. However, as of today, this is the most recent season in which the Jets have qualified for the playoffs, as they currently possess the longest active playoff appearance drought in the NFL, as well as any of the four major North American sports leagues.

== Offseason ==
=== Acquisitions ===
- WR Larry Taylor, P T. J. Conley, LB Josh Mauga and LB Ezra Butler signed future contracts on January 7, 2010.
- Former Canadian Football League alumni, cornerback Bo Smith and wide receiver S. J. Green were signed to future contracts on January 8, 2010.
- Long snapper Tanner Purdum was signed on February 5, 2010 from free agency.
- Kicker Nick Folk and offensive lineman Mike Turkovich were signed on February 23, 2010 via free agency.
- Safety Brodney Pool was signed on March 11, 2010 from free agency.
- Running back LaDainian Tomlinson signed with the team on March 14, 2010 from free agency.
- Defensive lineman Rodrique Wright was signed on March 16, 2010 from free agency.
- Linebacker Lance Laury was signed on March 19, 2010 from free agency.
- Kicker Clint Stitser was signed on April 7, 2010 from free agency to compete with Nick Folk.
- Linebacker Jason Taylor signed with the Jets on April 20, 2010 after the Miami Dolphins, Taylor's former team, failed to commit to the linebacker. Taylor signed a two-year deal.
- Cornerback Donovan Warren who went undrafted in the 2010 NFL draft was immediately signed by the Jets following the draft. He is expected to compete for a spot as a safety.
- Tight end Jeff Cumberland, guard Charlie Tanner, and linebacker Kevin Basped, were signed on April 24, 2010 as an undrafted free agents.
- On April 26, 2010, the Jets signed Brian Jackson, Keith Buckman, Jason Lamb, Broderick Stewart, Matt Stommes and Ernest Williams.
- On May 3, 2010 the Jets signed linebackers Brashton Satele and Cory Reamer.
- On May 14, 2010 the Jets signed OG Marlon Davis and C Robbie Felix.
- The Jets signed rookie offensive tackle Aaron Kia on May 18, 2010. Kia previously played for the University of Hawaii in 2009 as their starting left tackle.
- On June 3, 2010, the Jets signed former Oregon Duck, DT/DE Simi Toeaina.
- On June 11, 2010, the Jets signed former Washington Huskies punter and kicker, Jared Ballman.
- The Jets signed NT Martin Tevaseu, an undrafted free agent from UNLV, on July 20, 2010.
- Veteran quarterback Mark Brunell signed a two-year deal with the Jets on July 28, 2010.
- Safety Emanuel Cook signed with the team on July 29, 2010.
- On August 2, 2010, the Jets signed wide receiver Vic Hall. Hall previously had a brief tenure with the Chicago Bears.
- On August 8, 2010, the Jets announced that offensive lineman Adam Tadisch had been signed. Tadisch played collegiately at North Dakota State before spending the 2010 season with the Cleveland Gladiators of the Arena Football League.
- On August 9, 2010, the Jets signed former Stephen F. Austin linebacker Tim Knicky.
- On August 14, 2010, the Jets signed offensive guard Chet Teofilo.
- On August 19, 2010, the Jets signed linebacker Boris Lee who formerly played for Troy.
- Veteran wide receiver Laveranues Coles signed with the Jets on July 30, 2010. The signing marked Coles' third stint with the team.
- On August 24, 2010, the Jets signed wide receiver Brooks Foster and safety Keith Fitzhugh.
- On August 31, 2010, the Jets signed defensive end Ricky Foley.
- On September 5, 2010, the Jets claimed wide receiver Patrick Turner, offensive lineman Patrick Brown and Marcus Dixon off waivers.
- Defensive lineman Trevor Pryce was signed on September 30, 2010.

=== Departures ===
- Cornerback Donald Strickland was released on March 5, 2010 after one season.
- Linebacker Broderick Stewart was waived on May 3, 2010.
- Center Michael Parenton was waived on May 14, 2010. Parenton had previously spent the 2009 season on the Jets practice squad and was given a future/reserve contract in February.
- Offensive Lineman Keith Buckman was waived on May 14, 2010.
- On May 18, 2010, the Jets released S. J. Green and Matt Stommes, following the first Organized Team Activities practice of the year.
- On May 27, 2010, Kicker Clint Stitser was waived by the team after failing to impress during organized team activities.
- On June 22, 2010, safety Brannon Condren, kicker Jared Ballman and defensive tackle Ernest Williams were cut by the team.
- The Jets waived defensive tackle Simi Toeaina on July 12, 2010.
- The team waived linebacker Ezra Butler on July 29, 2010.
- The Jets waived wide receiver Britt Davis on August 1, 2010.
- On August 8, 2010, the Jets waived Aaron Kia and Kevin Basped.
- On August 14, 2010, the Jets waived offensive lineman Marlon Davis.
- On August 19, 2010, the Jets waived punter T. J. Conley.
- On August 24, 2010, the Jets waived receiver Vic Hall and offensive tackle Adam Tadisch.
- On August 29, 2010, the Jets waived defensive lineman Rodrique Wright, and wide receivers Aundrae Allison, Marcus Henry and Laveranues Coles.
- On August 31, 2010, the Jets released backup quarterback Kevin O'Connell.
- On September 4, 2010, the Jets waived Emanuel Cook, Jason Davis, Keith Fitzhugh, Ricky Foley, Brooks Foster, Josh Mauga, Bo Smith, Ty Steinkuhler, Robby Felix, Dan Gay, Tim Knicky, Jason Lamb, Boris Lee, Cory Reamer, Brashton Satele, Charlie Tanner, Larry Taylor, Chet Teofilo, Martin Tevaseu, Donovan Warren and Mike Turkovich.
- On September 5, 2010, the Jets waived David Clowney and Chauncey Washington while releasing Tony Richardson.
- On October 26, 2010, the Jets waived defensive tackle Howard Green in order to promote linebacker Josh Mauga to the active roster.

=== Free agents ===
Position	Player	Free agency tag	Date signed/released	2010 team	Notes
QB	Kellen Clemens	RFA	April 13, 2010	New York Jets	
CB	Drew Coleman	RFA	April 14, 2010	New York Jets	
LS	James Dearth	UFA	September 15, 2010	San Diego Chargers	
DE	Marques Douglas	UFA			
WR	Braylon Edwards	RFA	March 22, 2010	New York Jets	
G	Alan Faneca	Released	April 24, 2010	Arizona Cardinals	
K	Jay Feely	UFA	April 2, 2010	Arizona Cardinals	
LB	Ryan Fowler	UFA			
DT	Howard Green	RFA	October 27, 2010	Green Bay Packers	
TE	Ben Hartsock	UFA	March 8, 2010	New York Jets	
OT	Wayne Hunter	RFA	March 23, 2010	New York Jets	
S	James Ihedigbo	RFA	March 22, 2010	New York Jets	
LB	Larry Izzo	UFA			
RB	Thomas Jones	Released	March 9, 2010	Kansas City Chiefs	
CB	Justin Miller	Released	November 28, 2009		
LB	Marques Murrell	RFA			
FB	Tony Richardson	UFA	September 6, 2010	New York Jets	
CB	Lito Sheppard	Released	April 21, 2010	Minnesota Vikings	
S	Eric Smith	RFA	March 18, 2010	New York Jets	
WR	Brad Smith	RFA	March 22, 2010	New York Jets	
WR	Wallace Wright	RFA	March 8, 2010	Carolina Panthers	
RFA: Restricted free agent, UFA: Unrestricted free agent, ERFA: Exclusive rights free agent.
New York Jets Free Agents via ESPN.

=== Contract extensions ===
- On July 7, 2010, D'Brickashaw Ferguson signed a five-year contract extension with the option of a sixth year being picked up.
- On July 30, 2010, the team announced that head coach Rex Ryan and general manager Mike Tannenbaum both received contract extensions through 2014.
- On August 8, 2010, special teams coordinator Mike Westhoff received a one-year contract extension. Westhoff will remain with the team through 2011 and barring any setbacks will retire following the 2011 season.
- On August 24, 2010, center Nick Mangold signed a seven-year, $55 million contract extension with $22.5 million in guarantees. By signing the extension, Mangold became the highest paid center in the National Football League at the time.
- On September 5, 2010, head coach Rex Ryan and owner Woody Johnson visited cornerback Darrelle Revis at his Florida home. Revis, who had been disgruntled over a contract dispute with the team, agreed in principle to sign a four-year $46 million contract with $32 million guaranteed. The team announced the signing on September 6.

=== Trades ===
==== To Jets ====
- Antonio Cromartie was traded to the Jets on March 4, 2010 from the San Diego Chargers for a third round 2011 NFL draft pick, that can possibly turn into a second round depending on his performance.
- Santonio Holmes was traded to the Jets on April 11, 2010 from the Pittsburgh Steelers for a fifth round 2010 NFL Draft pick.

==== From Jets ====
- Kerry Rhodes was traded to the Arizona Cardinals on March 6, 2010 for a fourth round 2010 NFL draft pick and a seventh round 2011 NFL Draft pick.
- On April 24, 2010, the Jets traded Leon Washington and their seventh round pick in the 2010 NFL draft to the Seattle Seahawks for Seattle's fifth round pick which the Jets used to select FB John Conner.

=== 2010 NFL draft ===
Draft order		Player name	Position	Height	Weight	College	Notes
RD	PK	Player name	Position	Height	Weight	College	Notes
1	29 (29)	Kyle Wilson	Cornerback	5'10"	194 lbs. (88 kg.)	Boise State University	Signed a five-year $13 million contract on July 31, 2010.
2	29 (61)	Vladimir Ducasse	Offensive tackle	6'4"	332 lbs. (151 kg.)	University of Massachusetts Amherst	Signed a four-year contract on July 7, 2010.
3	29 (92)	Traded to Cleveland Browns along with WR Chansi Stuckey and LB Jason Trusnik for WR Braylon Edwards.					
4	14 (112)	Joe McKnight	Running back	6'0"	198 lbs. (86 kg.)	University of Southern California	From Carolina Panthers for 124 and 198 overall picks. Signed a four contract on June 22, 2010.
4	26 (124)	From Arizona Cardinals for Kerry Rhodes then traded to Carolina Panthers for the 112 overall pick.					
4	29 (127)	Traded to Philadelphia Eagles for CB Lito Sheppard					
5	8 (139)	John Conner	Fullback	5'11"	246 lbs. (112 kg.)	University of Kentucky	From Seattle Seahawks for Leon Washington and the 236 overall pick. Signed a four contract on June 4, 2010.
5	24 (155)	From Philadelphia Eagles for Lito Sheppard then traded to Pittsburgh Steelers for Santonio Holmes.					
5	29 (160)	Traded to Cleveland Browns along with WR Chansi Stuckey and LB Jason Trusnik for WR Braylon Edwards.					
6	29 (198)	Traded to Carolina Panthers for the 112 overall pick.					
7	29 (236)	Traded to Seattle Seahawks along with Leon Washington for the 139 overall pick.					

== Staff ==
2010 New York Jets staff
Front office: Owner – Woody Johnson; Head coaches: Head coach – Rex Ryan; Assistant head coach/offensive line – Bill Callahan; Offensive coaches: Offensive coordinator – Brian Schottenheimer; Quarterbacks – Matt Cavanaugh; Running backs – Anthony Lynn; Wide receivers – Henry Ellard; Assistant offensive line/tight ends – Mike Devlin; Coaching intern – Lance Taylor; Coaching intern – Samson Brown	Defensive coaches: Defensive coordinator – Mike Pettine; Defensive line coach – Mark Carrier; Outside linebackers – Jeff Weeks; Linebackers – Bob Sutton; Secondary – Dennis Thurman; Assistant defensive backs – Jim O'Neil; Intern-defensive – Brian Smith; Coaching intern – Mike Smith; Coaching intern – Clyde Simmons; Special teams coaches: Special teams coordinator – Mike Westhoff; Assistant special teams – Ben Kotwica; Strength and conditioning: Strength and conditioning – Sal Alosi; Assistant strength and conditioning – Kyle Thorne; Assistant strength and conditioning – Bryan Dermody

== Final roster ==
2010 New York Jets roster
Quarterbacks (QB): 8 Mark Brunell; 11 Kellen Clemens; 6 Mark Sanchez; Running backs (RB): 38 John Conner FB; 23 Shonn Greene; 25 Joe McKnight; 49 Tony Richardson FB; 21 LaDainian Tomlinson; Wide receivers (WR): 89 Jerricho Cotchery; 17 Braylon Edwards; 10 Santonio Holmes; 16 Brad Smith KR; Tight ends (TE): 86 Jeff Cumberland; 84 Ben Hartsock; 81 Dustin Keller; 82 Matthew Mulligan	Offensive linemen (OL): 62 Vladimir Ducasse G; 60 D'Brickashaw Ferguson T; 78 Wayne Hunter T; 74 Nick Mangold C; 65 Brandon Moore G; 68 Matt Slauson G; 75 Rob Turner C/G; 67 Damien Woody T; Defensive linemen (DL): 70 Mike DeVito DE; 94 Marcus Dixon DE; 92 Shaun Ellis DE; 50 Vernon Gholston DE; 71 Jarron Gilbert DE; 91 Sione Po'uha NT; 93 Trevor Pryce DE	Linebackers (LB): 52 David Harris ILB; 56 Lance Laury ILB; 53 Josh Mauga ILB; 97 Calvin Pace OLB; 57 Bart Scott ILB; 99 Jason Taylor OLB; 58 Bryan Thomas OLB; 55 Jamaal Westerman OLB; Defensive backs (DB): 34 Marquice Cole CB; 30 Drew Coleman CB; 37 Emanuel Cook FS; 31 Antonio Cromartie CB; 44 James Ihedigbo SS; 26 Dwight Lowery SS; 22 Brodney Pool FS; 24 Darrelle Revis CB; 33 Eric Smith FS; 29 Isaiah Trufant CB; 20 Kyle Wilson CB; Special teams (ST): 2 Nick Folk K; 46 Tanner Purdum LS; 9 Steve Weatherford P	Practice squad: 51 Cody Brown LB; 95 Shawn Crable LB; 59 Robby Felix C; 98 Matt Kroul NT; 96 Martin Tevaseu NT; 18 Logan Payne WR; 48 Brashton Satele LB; 88 Patrick Turner WR; Reserve: -- Erik Ainge QB (NF-Ill.); 77 Kris Jenkins NT (IR); 36 Jim Leonhard SS (IR); 7 Kevin O'Connell QB (IR); 79 Ropati Pitoitua DE (IR); Rookies in italics 53 active, 5 reserve, 8 practice squad

== Preseason ==
Week	Date	Opponent	Result	Record	Venue	Recap
1	August 16	New York Giants	L 16–31	0–1	New Meadowlands Stadium	Recap
2	August 21	at Carolina Panthers	W 9–3	1–1	Bank of America Stadium	Recap
3	August 27	Washington Redskins	L 11–16	1–2	New Meadowlands Stadium	Recap
4	September 2	at Philadelphia Eagles	W 21–17	2–2	Lincoln Financial Field	Recap

== Regular season ==
=== Schedule ===
Week	Date	Opponent	Result	Record	Venue	Recap
1	September 13	Baltimore Ravens	**L** 9–10	0–1	New Meadowlands Stadium	Recap
2	September 19	**New England Patriots**	**W** 28–14	1–1	New Meadowlands Stadium	Recap
3	September 26	at **Miami Dolphins**	**W** 31–23	2–1	Sun Life Stadium	Recap
4	October 3	at **Buffalo Bills**	**W** 38–14	3–1	Ralph Wilson Stadium	Recap
5	October 11	Minnesota Vikings	**W** 29–20	4–1	New Meadowlands Stadium	Recap
6	October 17	at Denver Broncos	**W** 24–20	5–1	Invesco Field at Mile High	Recap
7	Bye					
8	October 31	Green Bay Packers	**L** 0–9	5–2	New Meadowlands Stadium	Recap
9	November 7	at Detroit Lions	**W** 23–20 (OT)	6–2	Ford Field	Recap
10	November 14	at Cleveland Browns	**W** 26–20 (OT)	7–2	Cleveland Browns Stadium	Recap
11	November 21	Houston Texans	**W** 30–27	8–2	New Meadowlands Stadium	Recap
12	November 25	Cincinnati Bengals	**W** 26–10	9–2	New Meadowlands Stadium	Recap
13	December 6	at **New England Patriots**	**L** 3–45	9–3	Gillette Stadium	Recap
14	December 12	**Miami Dolphins**	**L** 6–10	9–4	New Meadowlands Stadium	Recap
15	December 19	at Pittsburgh Steelers	**W** 22–17	10–4	Heinz Field	Recap
16	December 26	at Chicago Bears	**L** 34–38	10–5	Soldier Field	Recap
17	January 2	**Buffalo Bills**	**W** 38–7	11–5	New Meadowlands Stadium	Recap

Note: Intra-division opponents are in bold text.

=== Standings ===
==== Division ====
AFC East
	W	L	T	PCT	DIV	CONF	PF	PA	STK
^{(1)} New England Patriots	14	2	0	.875	5–1	10–2	518	313	W8
^{(6)} New York Jets	11	5	0	.688	4–2	9–3	367	304	W1
Miami Dolphins	7	9	0	.438	2–4	5–7	273	333	L3
Buffalo Bills	4	12	0	.250	1–5	3–9	283	425	L2

==== Conference ====
AFC
#	Team	Division	W	L	T	PCT	DIV	CONF	SOS	SOV	STK
**Division winners**
1	New England Patriots	East	14	2	0	.875	5–1	10–2	.504	.504	W8
2 (Note: Pittsburgh clinched the AFC North title instead of Baltimore based on division record (5–1 to Baltimore's 4–2).)	Pittsburgh Steelers	North	12	4	0	.750	5–1	9–3	.500	.417	W2
3 (Note: Indianapolis clinched the AFC No. 3 seed instead of Kansas City based on a head-to-head victory.)	Indianapolis Colts	South	10	6	0	.625	4–2	8–4	.473	.425	W4
4	Kansas City Chiefs	West	10	6	0	.625	2–4	6–6	.414	.381	L1
**Wild cards**
5	Baltimore Ravens	North	12	4	0	.750	4–2	9–3	.484	.422	W4
6	New York Jets	East	11	5	0	.688	4–2	9–3	.492	.409	W1
**Did not qualify for the postseason**
7	San Diego Chargers	West	9	7	0	.563	3–3	7–5	.457	.410	W1
8 (Note: Jacksonville finished ahead of Oakland based on head-to-head victory.)	Jacksonville Jaguars	South	8	8	0	.500	3–3	7–5	.453	.383	L3
9	Oakland Raiders	West	8	8	0	.500	6–0	6–6	.469	.469	W1
10	Miami Dolphins	East	7	9	0	.438	2–4	5–7	.539	.438	L3
11 (Note: Houston finished ahead of Tennessee in the AFC South based on division record (3–3 to Tennessee's 2–4).)	Houston Texans	South	6	10	0	.375	3–3	5–7	.523	.500	W1
12	Tennessee Titans	South	6	10	0	.375	2–4	3–9	.508	.500	L2
13	Cleveland Browns	North	5	11	0	.313	1–5	3–9	.570	.475	L4
14 (Note: Denver finished ahead of Buffalo and Cincinnati based on strength of victory.)	Denver Broncos	West	4	12	0	.250	1–5	3–9	.516	.453	L1
15 (Note: Buffalo finished ahead of Cincinnati based on head-to-head victory.)	Buffalo Bills	East	4	12	0	.250	1–5	3–9	.578	.344	L2
16	Cincinnati Bengals	North	4	12	0	.250	2–4	3–9	.582	.438	L1
**Tiebreakers** (Note: When breaking ties for three or more teams under the NFL's rules, they are first broken within divisions, then comparing only the highest ranked remaining team from each division.)

== Regular season game summaries ==
=== Week 1: vs. Baltimore Ravens ===
Week 1: Baltimore Ravens at New York Jets – Game summary

Quarter	1	2	3	4	Total
Ravens	0	7	3	0	10
Jets	3	3	0	3	9

at New Meadowlands Stadium, East Rutherford, New Jersey

- Date: September 13
- Game time: 7:00 pm EDT
- Game weather: 67 °F (19.4 °C)
- Game attendance: 78,127
- Referee: Walt Anderson
- TV announcers (ESPN): Mike Tirico, Ron Jaworski, Jon Gruden, & Michele Tafoya
- Recap, Gamebook

Game information

First quarter

- NYJ – Nick Folk 23-yard field goal, Jets 3–0, Drive: 4 plays, 6 yards, 1:36.

Second quarter

- NYJ – Nick Folk 28-yard field goal, Jets 6–0, Drive: 5 plays, 27 yards, 3:23.
- BAL – Willis McGahee 1-yard run (Billy Cundiff kick), Ravens 7–6, Drive: 11 plays, 76 yards, 4:03.

Third quarter

- BAL – Billy Cundiff 25-yard field goal, Ravens 10–6, Drive: 9 plays, 85 yards, 4:30.

Fourth quarter

- NYJ – Nick Folk 48-yard field goal, Ravens 10–9, Drive: 4 plays, 5 yards, 1:30.

Top passers

- BAL – Joe Flacco – 20/38, 248 yards, 1 interception
- NYJ – Mark Sanchez – 10/21, 74 yards

Top rushers

- BAL – Ray Rice – 21 rushes, 43 yards
- NYJ – LaDainian Tomlinson – 11 rushes, 62 yards

Top receivers

- BAL – Anquan Boldin – 7 receptions, 110 yards
- NYJ – Jerricho Cotchery – 2 receptions, 18 yards

Top tacklers

- BAL – Ray Lewis – 4 tackles
- NYJ – Bryan Thomas – 7 tackles, 1 assist, 1 sack

In their first game at their new stadium, the Jets began their season for an AFC duel with the Baltimore Ravens. In the first quarter, the Jets took the early lead with kicker Nick Folk hitting a 23-yard field goal. Then he nailed a 28-yard field goal in the second quarter to bring the Jets up 6–0. After that, the Ravens replied and took the lead when RB Willis McGahee completed a 1-yard TD run. The Ravens extended their lead in the third quarter when kicker Billy Cundiff got a 25-yard field goal. The Jets cut the lead in the fourth quarter with Folk making a 48-yard field goal, but it wasn't enough, giving the Jets a loss.

With the close loss, the Jets began at 0–1.

=== Week 2: vs. New England Patriots ===
Week 2: New England Patriots at New York Jets – Game summary

Quarter	1	2	3	4	Total
Patriots	0	14	0	0	14
Jets	0	10	11	7	28

at New Meadowlands Stadium, East Rutherford, New Jersey

- Date: September 19
- Game time: 4:15 pm EDT
- Game weather: 81 °F (27.2 °C) (Clear)
- Game attendance: 78,535
- Referee: Ed Hochuli
- TV announcers (CBS): Jim Nantz and Phil Simms
- Recap, Gamebook

Game information

First quarter

Second quarter

- NE – Wes Welker 6-yard pass from Tom Brady (Stephen Gostkowski kick), Patriots 7–0, Drive: 15 plays, 75 yards, 8:10.
- NYJ – Braylon Edwards 10-yard pass from Mark Sanchez (Nick Folk kick), Tied 7–7, Drive: 12 plays, 77 yards, 6:55.
- NE – Randy Moss 34-yard pass from Tom Brady (Stephen Gostkowski kick), Patriots 14–7, Drive: 4 plays, 80 yards, 0:48.
- NYJ – Nick Folk 49-yard field goal, Patriots 14–10, Drive: 7 plays, 49 yards, 0:53.

Third quarter

- NYJ – Nick Folk 36-yard field goal, Patriots 14–13, Drive: 10 plays, 80 yards, 4:47.
- NYJ – Jerricho Cotchery 2-yard pass from Mark Sanchez (Mark Sanchez – Braylon Edwards pass), Jets 21–14, Drive: 6 plays, 70 yards, 3:02.

Fourth quarter

- NYJ – Dustin Keller 1-yard pass from Mark Sanchez (Nick Folk kick), Jets 28–14, Drive: 8 plays, 63 yards, 4:59.

Top passers

- NE – Tom Brady – 20/36, 248 yards, 2 touchdowns, 2 interceptions
- NYJ – Mark Sanchez – 21/30, 220 yards, 3 touchdowns

Top rushers

- NE – Kevin Faulk – 5 rushes, 22 yards
- NYJ – LaDainian Tomlinson – 11 rushes, 76 yards

Top receivers

- NE – Aaron Hernandez – 6 receptions, 101 yards
- NYJ – Dustin Keller – 7 receptions, 115 yards, 1 touchdown

Top tacklers

- NE – Tully Banta-Cain – 8 tackles, 1 sack
- NYJ – Sione Pouha – 6 tackles

The Jets started slow by accruing no passing yards during the first quarter, but the Patriots went down the field in two long drives taking up most of the time in the first half. In the second quarter, the Patriots took the early lead as quarterback Tom Brady completed a 6-yard touchdown pass to wide receiver Wes Welker, but the Jets replied with quarterback Mark Sanchez completing a 10-yard touchdown pass to wide receiver Braylon Edwards. The Patriots scored again with Brady finding wide receiver Randy Moss on a 34-yard touchdown pass. The Jets narrowed the Patriots' lead when kicker Nick Folk nailed a 49-yard field goal, followed by him making a 36-yard field goad in the third quarter. The Jets got the lead when Sanchez completed a 2-yard touchdown pass to wide receiver Jerricho Cotchery (with a successful 2-point conversion). The Jets extended their lead in the fourth quarter when Sanchez making a 1-yard touchdown pass to tight end Dustin Keller.

With the win, the Jets improved to 1–1.

=== Week 3: at Miami Dolphins ===
Week 3: New York Jets at Miami Dolphins – Game summary

Quarter	1	2	3	4	Total
Jets	7	7	7	10	31
Dolphins	0	10	10	3	23

at Sun Life Stadium, Miami Gardens, Florida

- Date: September 26
- Game time: 8:20 pm EDT
- Game weather: 83 °F (28.3 °C) (Cloudy)
- Game attendance: 70,481
- Referee: Jerome Boger
- TV announcers (NBC): Al Michaels, Cris Collinsworth and Andrea Kremer
- http://www.nfl.com/gamecenter/2010092614/2010/REG3/jets@dolphins

Game information

First quarter

- NYJ – Dustin Keller 24-yard pass from Mark Sanchez (Nick Folk kick), Jets 7–0, Drive: 10 plays, 72 yards, 5:43.

Second quarter

- NYJ – Dustin Keller 12-yard pass from Mark Sanchez (Nick Folk kick), Jets 14–0, Drive: 7 plays, 90 yards, 4:07.
- MIA – Anthony Fasano 3-yard pass from Chad Henne (Dan Carpenter kick), Jets 14–7, Drive: 9 plays, 76 yards, 4:21.
- MIA – Dan Carpenter 44-yard field goal, Jets 14–10, Drive: 12 plays, 59 yards, 6:23.

Third quarter

- MIA – Brandon Marshall 11-yard pass from Chad Henne (Dan Carpenter kick), Dolphins 17–14, Drive: 12 plays, 73 yards, 6:13.
- NYJ – Braylon Edwards 67-yard pass from Mark Sanchez (Nick Folk kick), Jets 21–17, Drive: 1 plays, 67 yards, 0:18.
- MIA – Dan Carpenter 20-yard field goal, Jets 21–20, Drive: 8 plays, 73 yards, 3:15.

Fourth quarter

- NYJ – Nick Folk 30-yard field goal, Jets 24–20, Drive: 8 plays, 5 yards, 4:10.
- MIA – Dan Carpenter 50-yard field goal, Jets 24–23, Drive: 6 plays, 18 yards, 2:14.
- NYJ – LaDainian Tomlinson 1-yard run (Nick Folk kick), Jets 31–23, Drive: 12 plays, 80 yards, 4:47.

Top passers

- NYJ – Mark Sanchez – 15/28, 253 yards, 3 touchdowns
- MIA – Chad Henne – 26/44, 363 yards, 2 touchdowns, 1 interception

Top rushers

- NYJ – LaDainian Tomlinson – 15 rushes, 70 yards, 1 touchdown
- MIA – Ronnie Brown – 11 rushes, 54 yards

Top receivers

- NYJ – Dustin Keller – 6 receptions, 98 yards, 2 touchdowns
- MIA – Brandon Marshall – 10 receptions, 166 yards, 1 touchdown

Top tacklers

- NYJ – David Harris – 7 tackles
- MIA – Yeremiah Bell – 8 tackles, 1 assist

Coming off their divisional win over the Patriots, the Jets flew to Sun Life Stadium for a Week 3 AFC East duel with the Miami Dolphins on Sunday night. New York delivered the game's opening strike in the first quarter as quarterback Mark Sanchez completed a 24-yard touchdown pass to tight end Dustin Keller. The Jets added onto their lead in the second quarter as Sanchez hooked up with Keller again on a 12-yard touchdown pass. The Dolphins answered as quarterback Chad Henne connected with tight end Anthony Fasano on a 3-yard touchdown pass, followed by kicker Dan Carpenter making a 44-yard field goal.

Miami took the lead in the third quarter as Henne found wide receiver Brandon Marshall on an 11-yard touchdown pass, yet New York immediately struck back as Sanchez completed a 67-yard touchdown pass to wide receiver Braylon Edwards. The Dolphins cut into the lead as Carpenter made a 20-yard field goal. In the fourth quarter, the Jets responded with kicker Nick Folk making a 30-yard field goal. Miami struck back with Carpenter's 50-yard field goal, yet New York stayed persistent as running back LaDainian Tomlinson got a 1-yard touchdown run. Miami tried to get a comeback drive going, but the defense came through to hold onto the victory.

With the win, the Jets improved to 2–1.

=== Week 4: at Buffalo Bills ===
Week 4: New York Jets at Buffalo Bills – Game summary

Quarter	1	2	3	4	Total
Jets	7	10	21	0	38
Bills	0	7	0	7	14

at Ralph Wilson Stadium, Orchard Park, New York

- Date: October 3
- Game time: 1:00 pm EDT
- Game weather: 51 °F (10.6 °C) (Showers)
- Game attendance: 69,262
- Referee: Bill Leavy
- TV announcers (CBS): Greg Gumbel and Dan Dierdorf
- http://www.nfl.com/gamecenter/2010100300/2010/REG4/jets@bills

Game information

First quarter

- NYJ – LaDainian Tomlinson 1-yard run (Nick Folk kick), Jets 7–0, Drive: 9 plays, 63 yards, 4:18.

Second quarter

- NYJ – Nick Folk 19-yard field goal, Jets 10–0, Drive: 18 plays, 87 yards, 9:21.
- NYJ – Braylon Edwards 41-yard pass from Mark Sanchez (Nick Folk kick), Jets 17–0, Drive: 3 plays, 66 yards, 1:29.
- BUF – David Martin 4-yard pass from Ryan Fitzpatrick (Rian Lindell kick), Jets 17–7, Drive: 7 plays, 64 yards, 1:59.

Third quarter

- NYJ – Dustin Keller 3-yard pass from Brad Smith (Nick Folk kick), Jets 24–7, Drive: 10 plays, 69 yards, 5:22.
- NYJ – Dustin Keller 2-yard pass from Mark Sanchez (Nick Folk kick), Jets 31–7, Drive: 3 plays, 23 yards, 1:20.
- NYJ – LaDainian Tomlinson 26-yard run (Nick Folk kick), Jets 38–7, Drive: 2 plays, 35 yards, 0:44.

Fourth quarter

- BUF – Stevie Johnson 13-yard pass from Ryan Fitzpatrick (Rian Lindell kick), Jets 38–14, Drive: 5 plays, 79 yards, 2:23.

Top passers

- NYJ – Mark Sanchez – 14/24, 161 yards, 2 touchdowns
- BUF – Ryan Fitzpatrick – 12/27, 128 yards, 2 touchdowns

Top rushers

- NYJ – LaDainian Tomlinson – 19 rushes, 133 yards, 2 touchdowns
- BUF – Ryan Fitzpatrick – 7 rushes, 74 yards

Top receivers

- NYJ – Braylon Edwards – 4 receptions, 86 yards, 1 touchdown
- BUF – David Nelson – 4 receptions, 75 yards,

Top tacklers

- NYJ – David Harris – 4 tackles, 2 assists
- BUF – Donte Whitner – 9 tackles, 4 assists

Coming off their divisional road win over the Dolphins, the Jets flew to Ralph Wilson Stadium for a Week 4 AFC East duel with the throwback-clad Buffalo Bills. New York scored in the first quarter as running back LaDainian Tomlinson got a 1-yard touchdown run. The Jets added onto their lead in the second quarter with a 19-yard field goal from kicker Nick Folk, followed by quarterback Mark Sanchez completing a 41-yard touchdown pass to wide receiver Braylon Edwards. The Bills closed out the half with quarterback Ryan Fitzpatrick finding tight end David Martin on a 4-yard touchdown pass.

New York pulled away in the third quarter as tight end Dustin Keller caught a 3-yard touchdown pass from wide receiver/quarterback Brad Smith, followed by his 2-yard touchdown reception thrown by Sanchez. Afterwards, Tomlinson's 26-yard touchdown run effectively secured the victory. Buffalo closed out the game in the fourth quarter as Fitzpatrick threw a touchdown pass to wide receiver Stevie Johnson.

With the win, the Jets improved to 3–1.

=== Week 5: vs. Minnesota Vikings ===
Week 5: Minnesota Vikings at New York Jets – Game summary

Quarter	1	2	3	4	Total
Vikings	0	0	7	13	20
Jets	3	6	6	14	29

at New Meadowlands Stadium, East Rutherford, New Jersey

- Date: October 11
- Game time: 9:15 pm EDT*
- Game weather: 72 °F (22.2 °C) (Cloudy)
- Game attendance: 77,909
- Referee: Pete Morelli
- TV announcers (ESPN): Mike Tirico, Ron Jaworski, Jon Gruden, Michele Tafoya, & Suzy Kolber
- http://www.nfl.com/gamecenter/2010101100/2010/REG5/vikings@jets

Game information

First quarter

- NYJ – Nick Folk 25-yard field goal, Jets 3–0, Drive: 7 plays, 33 yards, 3:32.

Second quarter

- NYJ – Nick Folk 53-yard field goal, Jets 6–0, Drive: 7 plays, 33 yards, 2:30.
- NYJ – Nick Folk 22-yard field goal, Jets 9–0, Drive: 14 plays, 43 yards, 3:43.

Third quarter

- NYJ – Nick Folk 34-yard field goal, Jets 12–0, Drive: 8 plays, 30 yards, 3:55.
- MIN – Randy Moss 37-yard pass from Brett Favre (Ryan Longwell kick), Jets 12–7, Drive: 10 plays, 72 yards, 4:01.
- NYJ – Nick Folk 31-yard field goal, Jets 15–7, Drive: 4 plays, 6 yards, 1:21.

Fourth quarter

- MIN – Percy Harvin 34-yard pass from Brett Favre (pass failed), Jets 15–13, Drive: 5 plays, 65 yards, 3:02.
- NYJ – Shonn Greene 23-yard run (Nick Folk kick), Jets 22–13, Drive: 6 plays, 66 yards, 2:36.
- MIN – Percy Harvin 11-yard pass from Brett Favre (Ryan Longwell kick), Jets 22–20, Drive: 5 plays, 54 yards, 1:21.
- NYJ – Dwight Lowery 26-yard interception return (Nick Folk kick), Jets 29–20

Top passers

- MIN – Brett Favre – 14/34, 264 yards, 3 touchdowns, 1 interception
- NYJ – Mark Sanchez – 21/44, 191 yards

Top rushers

- MIN – Adrian Peterson – 18 rushes, 88 yards
- NYJ – LaDainian Tomlinson – 20 rushes, 94 yards

Top receivers

- MIN – Percy Harvin – 5 receptions, 97 yards, 2 touchdowns
- NYJ – Braylon Edwards – 5 receptions, 70 yards

Top tacklers

- MIN – Chad Greenway – 9 tackles, 1 assist
- NYJ – Jim Leonhard – 8 tackles

Coming off their dominating divisional road win over the Bills, the Jets went home for a Week 5 interconference duel with the Minnesota Vikings on Monday night. New York took flight in the first quarter as kicker Nick Folk made a 25-yard field goal. The Jets added onto their lead in the second quarter as Folk booted a 53-yard and a 22-yard field goal.

New York continued to build their lead in the third quarter as Folk nailed a 34-yard field goal. The Vikings answered with quarterback Brett Favre completed a 37-yard touchdown pass to wide receiver Randy Moss, yet the Jets came right back with Folk's 31-yard field goal. After the match was delayed due to adverse weather conditions, Minnesota began to strike back in the fourth quarter as Favre connected with wide receiver Percy Harvin on a 34-yard touchdown pass (with a failed 2-point conversion). Afterwards, New York answer as running back Shonn Greene got a 23-yard touchdown run. The Vikings tried to rally as Favre found Harvin again on an 11-yard touchdown pass, yet the Jets put the game away as cornerback Dwight Lowery returned an interception 26 yards for a touchdown.

With the win, New York improved to 4–1.

=== Week 6: at Denver Broncos ===
Week 6: New York Jets at Denver Broncos – Game summary

Quarter	1	2	3	4	Total
Jets	0	7	3	14	24
Broncos	0	10	7	3	20

at INVESCO Field at Mile High, Denver, Colorado

- Date: October 17
- Game time: 4:05 pm EDT/2:05 pm MDT
- Game weather: 73 °F (22.8 °C) (Partly Cloudy)
- Game attendance: 75,982
- Referee: Tony Corrente
- TV announcers (CBS): Greg Gumbel and Dan Dierdorf
- http://www.nfl.com/gamecenter/2010101709/2010/REG6/jets@broncos

Game information

First quarter

Second quarter

- NYJ – Braylon Edwards 32-yard pass from Mark Sanchez (Nick Folk kick), Jets 7–0, Drive: 13 plays, 77 yards, 6:40.
- DEN – Tim Tebow 5-yard run (Matt Prater kick), Tied 7–7, Drive: 8 plays, 80 yards, 3:43.
- DEN – Matt Prater 59-yard field goal, Broncos 10–7, Drive: 7 plays, 24 yards, 0:39.

Third quarter

- NYJ – Nick Folk 56-yard field goal, Tied 10–10, Drive: 6 plays, 23 yards, 2:57.
- DEN – Demaryius Thomas 17-yard pass from Kyle Orton (Matt Prater kick), Broncos 17–10, Drive: 5 plays, 66 yards, 1:36.

Fourth quarter

- NYJ – LaDainian Tomlinson 20-yard run (Nick Folk kick), Tied 17–17, Drive: 5 plays, 54 yards, 2:07.
- DEN – Matt Prater 48-yard field goal, Broncos 20–17, Drive: 9 plays, 50 yards, 4:41.
- NYJ – LaDainian Tomlinson 2-yard run (Nick Folk kick), Jets 24–20, Drive: 10 plays, 80 yards, 2:42.

Top passers

- NYJ – Mark Sanchez – 17/30, 198 yards, 1 touchdown, 2 interceptions
- DEN – Kyle Orton 14/34, 209 yards, 1 touchdown

Top rushers

- NYJ – LaDainian Tomlinson – 16 rushes, 55 yards, 2 touchdowns
- DEN – Knowshon Moreno – 12 rushes, 48 yards

Top receivers

- NYJ – Dustin Keller – 3 receptions, 75 yards
- DEN – Jabar Gaffney – 6 receptions, 81 yards

Top tacklers

- NYJ – David Harris – 7 tackles, 1 assist
- DEN – D.J. Williams – 8 tackles, 3 assists, 1 sack

Hoping to increase their winning streak the Jets flew to INVESCO Field at Mile High for an AFC duel with the Broncos. In the 2nd quarter the Jets took the lead as QB Mark Sanchez made a 32-yard TD pass to WR Braylon Edwards. But Denver replied with QB Tim Tebow scrambling 5 yards to the endzone for a touchdown. This was followed by kicker Matt Prater nailing a 59-yard field goal. In the third quarter the Jets responded with kicker Nick Folk hitting a 56-yard field goal. The Jets fell behind when QB Kyle Orton made a 17-yard TD pass to WR Demaryius Thomas. But replied in the fourth quarter with RB LaDainian Tomlinson making a 20-yard TD run. The Jets trailed again with Prater making a 48-yard field goal. But pulled back in the lead when Tomlinson got a 2-yard TD run.

With the win, the Jets improve to 5–1.

=== Week 8: vs. Green Bay Packers ===
Week 8: Green Bay Packers at New York Jets – Game summary

Quarter	1	2	3	4	Total
Packers	3	0	0	6	9
Jets	0	0	0	0	0

at New Meadowlands Stadium, East Rutherford, New Jersey

- Date: October 31
- Game time: 1:00 pm EDT
- Game weather: 57 °F (13.9 °C) (Clear)
- Game attendance: 78,484
- Referee: Jeff Triplette
- TV announcers (Fox): Kenny Albert, Daryl Johnston and Tony Siragusa
- http://www.nfl.com/gamecenter/2010103106/2010/REG8/packers@jets

Game information

First quarter

- GB – Mason Crosby 20-yard field goal, Packers 3–0, Drive: 5 plays, 34 yards, 1:51.

Second quarter

Third quarter

Fourth quarter

- GB – Mason Crosby 41-yard field goal, Packers 6–0, Drive: 8 plays, 34 yards, 3:58.
- GB – Mason Crosby 40-yard field goal, Packers 9–0, Drive: 4 plays, 1 yards, 2:03.

Top passers

- GB – Aaron Rodgers – 15/34, 170 yards
- NYJ – Mark Sanchez – 16/38, 256 yards, 2 interceptions

Top rushers

- GB – Brandon Jackson – 15 rushes, 55 yards
- NYJ – LaDainian Tomlinson – 16 rushes, 54 yards

Top receivers

- GB – Greg Jennings – 6 receptions, 81 yards
- NYJ – Jerricho Cotchery – 4 receptions, 89 yards

Top tacklers

- GB – Desmond Bishop – 10 tackles
- NYJ – David Harris – 8 tackles, 1 assist

The Jets’ seventh game was an interconference duel with the Packers. Punter Steve Weatherford made the game's most controversial decision in the first quarter, opting to attempt a fake punt and run for the first down on 4th and 18. Weatherford was stopped a yard short of the first down, giving the Packers ideal field position which eventually led to an early 3–0 Packers lead. "He does it on his own," Ryan said. "(The Packers) were caving that side down. This was something Steve did on his own. I don't think he realized we'd just been sacked. We told him before that it needed to be a manageable situation, not fourth-and-20 or whatever it was.". In a game where defense ruled, the Packers lead 3–0 at halftime. The Jets challenged a Brad Smith fumble, and lost due to his knee not being down before losing the ball. However, the Jets second challenge went to a jump ball, called an interception after Packers cornerback Tramon Williams ripped the ball out of Jerricho Cotchery's hands while they were both on the ground. The play was controversially upheld, despite the fact that the receiver appeared to be down by contact. With no challenges left, Mark Sanchez threw a ball to Dustin Keller that was ripped out of his hands and ruled an interception in the 4th quarter. The replay showed that Keller made the catch and was also down before losing possession, but with no challenges left the Jets were left with nothing. Green Bay took a 6–0 lead after the turnover. The Jets had two more chances to take the lead but had drives halted on 4th and longs. The Packers added on another field goal late to finalize a 9–0 win in the New Meadowlands Stadium. This marked the first time since 2006 the Jets were shut out and they failed to win 6 games in a row for the first time since 1986.

With the loss, the Jets fell to 5–2.

=== Week 9: at Detroit Lions ===
Week 9: New York Jets at Detroit Lions – Game summary

Quarter	1	2	3	4	OT	Total
Jets	0	10	0	10	3	23
Lions	7	0	6	7	0	20

at Ford Field, Detroit, Michigan

- Date: November 7
- Game time: 1:00 pm EST
- Game weather: None (dome stadium)
- Game attendance: 57,799
- Referee: Al Riveron
- TV announcers (CBS): Gus Johnson and Steve Tasker
- http://www.nfl.com/gamecenter/2010110700/2010/REG9/jets@lions

Game information

First quarter

- DET – Brandon Pettigrew 10-yard pass from Matthew Stafford (Jason Hanson kick), Lions 7–0, Drive: 11 plays, 80 yards, 5:44.

Second quarter

- NYJ – Nick Folk 31-yard field goal, Lions 7–3, Drive: 9 plays, 74 yards, 3:57.
- NYJ – Braylon Edwards 74-yard pass from Mark Sanchez (Nick Folk kick), Jets 10–7, Drive: 3 plays, 75 yards, 0:48.

Third quarter

- DET – Matthew Stafford 1-yard run (kick failed, hru), Lions 13–10, Drive: 4 plays, 1 yards, 2:03.

Fourth quarter

- DET – Nate Burleson 2-yard pass from Matthew Stafford (Jason Hanson kick), Lions 20–10, Drive: 9 plays, 90 yards, 3:17.
- NYJ – Mark Sanchez 1-yard run (Nick Folk kick), Lions 20–17, Drive: 6 plays, 56 yards, 1:40.
- NYJ – Nick Folk 36-yard field goal, Tied 20–20, Drive: 9 plays, 60 yards, 1:40.

Overtime

- NYJ – Nick Folk 30-yard field goal, Jets 23–20, Drive: 5 plays, 56 yards, 2:18.

Top passers

- NYJ – Mark Sanchez – 22/39, 336 yards, 1 touchdown, 1 interception
- DET – Matthew Stafford – 20/36, 240 yards, 2 touchdowns

Top rushers

- NYJ – LaDainian Tomlinson – 15 rushes, 55 yards
- DET – Jahvid Best – 16 rushes, 48 yards

Top receivers

- NYJ – Santonio Holmes – 5 receptions, 114 yards
- DET – Nate Burleson – 7 receptions, 113 yards, 1 touchdown

Top tacklers

- NYJ – Jim Leonhard – 7 tackles
- DET – DeAndre Levy – 9 tackles, 1 assist

Hoping to rebound from their loss against the Packers, the Jets flew to Ford Field for an interconference duel with the Lions. In the first quarter the Jets trailed early as quarterback Matthew Stafford found tight end Brandon Pettigrew on a 10-yard touchdown pass. The Jets fought back and took the lead with Nick Folk hitting a 31-yard field goal, followed by quarterback Mark Sanchez completing a 74-yard touchdown pass to wide receiver Braylon Edwards. In the third quarter the Jets fell behind again as Stafford scrambled 1-yard for a touchdown however, the Lions missed the extra point, attempted by Ndamukong Suh who replaced the injured Jason Hanson. The miss proved to be instrumental in New York's victory.

Stafford followed up with 2-yard touchdown pass to wide receiver Nate Burleson in the fourth quarter. The Jets responded as Sanchez scrambled 1 yard for a touchdown, and then Nick Folk tied the game after making a 36-yard field goal that sent the game into overtime. With New York winning the coin toss, they began to move down field and after Sanchez found receiver Santonio Holmes on a 52-yard pass play, the Jets were in a position to win via field goal. Subsequently, Folk made the 30-yard field goal to lift the Jets over the Lions.

With the win, the Jets improved to 6–2.

=== Week 10: at Cleveland Browns ===
Week 10: New York Jets at Cleveland Browns – Game summary

Quarter	1	2	3	4	OT	Total
Jets	3	14	0	3	6	26
Browns	10	3	0	7	0	20

at Cleveland Browns Stadium, Cleveland, Ohio

- Date: November 14
- Game time: 1:00 pm EST
- Game weather: 46 °F (7.8 °C) (Cloudy)
- Game attendance: 67,449
- Referee: Terry McAulay
- TV announcers (CBS): Jim Nantz and Phil Simms
- http://www.nfl.com/gamecenter/2010111401/2010/REG10/jets@browns

Game information

First quarter

- CLE – Phil Dawson 34-yard field goal, Browns 3–0, Drive: 11 plays, 69 yards, 5:08.
- NYJ – Nick Folk 27-yard field goal, Tied 3–3, Drive: 9 plays, 33 yards, 4:00.
- CLE – Peyton Hillis 12-yard run (Phil Dawson kick), Browns 10–3, Drive: 5 plays, 61 yards, 2:50.

Second quarter

- NYJ – Jerricho Cotchery 25-yard pass from Mark Sanchez (Nick Folk kick), Tied 10–10, Drive: 9 plays, 76 yards, 4:07.
- CLE – Phil Dawson 23-yard field goal, Browns 13–10, Drive: 10 plays, 66 yards, 5:56.
- NYJ – Mark Sanchez 1-yard run (Nick Folk kick), Jets 17–13, Drive: 11 plays, 80 yards, 4:50.

Third quarter

Fourth quarter

- NYJ – Nick Folk 25-yard field goal, Jets 20–13, Drive: 13 plays, 56 yards, 7:45.
- CLE – Mohamed Massaquoi 3-yard pass from Colt McCoy (Phil Dawson kick), Tied 20–20, Drive: 10 plays, 59 yards, 1:58.

Overtime

- NYJ – Santonio Holmes 37-yard pass from Mark Sanchez, Drive: 1 plays, 37 yards, 0:08.

Top passers

- NYJ – Mark Sanchez – 27/44, 299 yards, 2 touchdowns, 1 interception
- CLE – Colt McCoy – 18/31, 205 yards, 1 touchdown

Top rushers

- NYJ – Shonn Greene – 20 rushes, 72 yards
- CLE – Peyton Hillis – 19 rushes, 82 yards, 1 touchdown

Top receivers

- NYJ – Santonio Holmes – 5 receptions, 76 yards, 1 touchdown
- CLE – Benjamin Watson – 5 receptions, 74 yards

Top tacklers

- NYJ – David Harris – 6 tackles, 1 assisted, 1 forced fumble
- CLE – Eric Barton – 6 tackles, 1 assisted

Coming off their win over the Lions, the Jets flew to Cleveland Browns Stadium for a Week 10 duel with the Cleveland Browns. New York trailed in the first quarter as Browns kicker Phil Dawson made a 34-yard field goal. The Jets answered with a 27-yard field goal from kicker Nick Folk, but Cleveland responded with running back Peyton Hillis getting a 12-yard touchdown run. New York tied the game in the second quarter with quarterback Mark Sanchez finding wide receiver Jerricho Cotchery on a 25-yard touchdown pass. The Browns regained the lead with Dawson's 23-yard field goal, yet the Jets took the lead with Sanchez's 1-yard touchdown run. After a scoreless third quarter, New York added onto their lead in the fourth quarter with Folk's 25-yard field goal. However, Cleveland tied the game with quarterback Colt McCoy completing a 3-yard touchdown pass to wide receiver Mohamed Massaquoi. In overtime, Sanchez found wide receiver Santonio Holmes on the game-ending 37-yard touchdown pass. The Jets became the first team in league history to win back-to-back overtime games on the road.

With the win, New York improved to 7–2.

=== Week 11: vs. Houston Texans ===
Week 11: Houston Texans at New York Jets – Game summary

Quarter	1	2	3	4	Total
Texans	0	7	0	20	27
Jets	3	10	7	10	30

at New Meadowlands Stadium, East Rutherford, New Jersey

- Date: November 21
- Game time: 1:00 pm EST
- Game weather: 46 °F (7.8 °C) (Sunny)
- Game attendance: 78,843
- Referee: Jerome Boger
- TV announcers (CBS): Greg Gumbel & Dan Dierdorf
- http://www.nfl.com/gamecenter/2010112101/2010/REG11/texans@jets

Game information

First quarter

- NYJ – Nick Folk 37-yard field goal, Jets 3–0, Drive: 6 plays, 10 yards, 1:47.

Second quarter

- HOU – Arian Foster 2-yard run (Neil Rackers kick), Texans 7–3, Drive: 11 plays, 67 yards, 5:35.
- NYJ – Braylon Edwards 4-yard pass from Mark Sanchez (Nick Folk kick), Jets 10–7, Drive: 10 plays, 78 yards, 4:59.
- NYJ – Nick Folk 33-yard field goal, Jets 13–7, Drive: 8 plays, 33 yards, 3:15.

Third quarter

- NYJ – Santonio Holmes 41-yard pass from Mark Sanchez (Nick Folk kick), Jets 20–7, Drive: 9 plays, 92 yards, 4:06.

Fourth quarter

- NYJ – Nick Folk 30-yard field goal, Jets 23–7, Drive: 4 plays, 10 yards, 1:28.
- HOU – Neil Rackers 38-yard field goal, Jets 23–10, Drive: 7 plays, 59 yards, 2:30.
- HOU – Joel Dreessen 43-yard pass from Matt Schaub (Neil Rackers kick), Jets 23–17, Drive: 1 plays, 43 yards, 0:09.
- HOU – Arian Foster 1-yard run (Neil Rackers kick), Texans 24–23, Drive: 7 plays, 73 yards, 3:51.
- HOU – Neil Rackers 22-yard field goal, Texans 27–23, Drive: 4 plays, 6 yards, 0:57.
- NYJ – Santonio Holmes 6-yard pass from Mark Sanchez (Nick Folk kick), Jets 30–27, Drive: 5 plays, 72 yards, 0:45.

Top passers

- HOU – Matt Schaub – 19/33, 254 yards, 1 touchdown
- NYJ – Mark Sanchez – 22/38, 315 yards, 3 touchdowns, 1 interception

Top rushers

- HOU – Arian Foster – 22 rushes, 84 yards, 2 touchdowns
- NYJ – Shonn Greene – 15 rushes, 42 yards

Top receivers

- HOU – Joel Dreessen – 4 receptions, 106 yards, 1 touchdown
- NYJ – Santonio Holmes – 7 receptions, 126 yards, 2 touchdowns

Top tacklers

- HOU – Kevin Bentley – 6 tackles, 2 assisted, 1 interception
- NYJ – Brodney Pool – 7 tackles

Hoping to increase their winning streak the Jets played on home ground for an AFC duel with the Texans. In the first quarter the Jets took the lead as kicker Nick Folk nailed a 37-yard field goal. The Texans replied in the second quarter with RB Arian Foster getting a 2-yard TD run. The Jets got the lead back as QB Mark Sanchez threw a 4-yard TD pass to WR Santonio Holmes; followed by Folk making a 30-yard field goal. The Jets' lead extended in the third quarter when Sanchez found Holmes again on a 41-yard TD pass. In the fourth quarter Folk made a 30-yard field goal to put the Jets up 23–7. The Texans rallied to take the lead back with kicker Neil Rackers nailing a 38-yard field goal, followed by QB Matt Schaub completing a 43-yard TD pass to TE Joel Dreessen, followed by Foster getting a 1-yard TD run, and then Rackers got a 22-yard field goal. The Jets still managed to score to get the win with Sanchez finding Holmes again on a 6-yard TD pass.

With the win, the Jets improve to 8–2.

=== Week 12: vs. Cincinnati Bengals (Thanksgiving Day Game) ===
Week 12: Cincinnati Bengals at New York Jets – Game summary

Quarter	1	2	3	4	Total
Bengals	0	7	0	3	10
Jets	0	3	14	9	26

at New Meadowlands Stadium, East Rutherford, New Jersey

- Date: November 25
- Game time: 8:20 pm EST
- Game weather: 39 °F (3.9 °C) (Cloudy)
- Game attendance: 78,903
- Referee: Mike Carey
- TV announcers (NFLN): Bob Papa, Matt Millen, & Joe Theismann
- http://www.nfl.com/gamecenter/2010112502/2010/REG12/bengals@jets

Game information

First quarter

Second quarter

- NYJ – Nick Folk 27-yard field goal, Jets 3–0, Drive: 9 plays, 69 yards, 4:05.
- CIN – Jordan Shipley 5-yard pass from Carson Palmer (Aaron Pettrey kick), Bengals 7–3, Drive: 10 plays, 63 yards, 2:11.

Third quarter

- NYJ – Brad Smith 53-yard run (Nick Folk kick), Jets 10–7, Drive: 2 plays, 69 yards, 0:47.
- NYJ – Santonio Holmes 13-yard pass from Mark Sanchez (Nick Folk kick), Jets 17–7, Drive: 2 plays, 14 yards, 0:48.

Fourth quarter

- CIN – Aaron Pettrey 28-yard field goal, Jets 17–10, Drive: 6 plays, 15 yards, 2:17.
- NYJ – Brad Smith 89-yard kickoff return (Nick Folk kick), Jets 24–10, Drive: 0 plays, 0 yards, 0:15.
- NYJ – Carson Palmer sacked in end zone by Trevor Pryce for a Safety, Jets 26–10.

Top passers

- CIN – Carson Palmer – 17/38, 135 yards, 1 touchdown, 2 interceptions
- NYJ – Mark Sanchez – 16/28, 166 yards, 1 touchdown, 1 interception

Top rushers

- CIN – Cedric Benson – 18 rushes, 41 yards
- NYJ – Shonn Greene – 18 rushes, 70 yards

Top receivers

- CIN – Chad Ochocinco – 4 receptions, 41 yards
- NYJ – Dustin Keller – 4 receptions, 49 yards

Top tacklers

- CIN – Dhani Jones – 10 tackles, 1 assist
- NYJ – Eric Smith – 8 tackles

Coming off their win over the Texans, the Jets stayed at home for a Week 12 Thanksgiving duel with the Cincinnati Bengals. After a scoreless first quarter, the Jets delivered the game's opening strike in the second quarter with a 27-yard field goal from kicker Nick Folk, but the Bengals answered with quarterback Carson Palmer completing a 5-yard touchdown pass to wide receiver Jordan Shipley.

New York regained the lead with a 53-yard touchdown end-around from wide receiver/quarterback Brad Smith and a 13-yard touchdown pass from Mark Sanchez to Santonio Holmes. Cincinnati responded in the fourth quarter as Aaron Pettrey kicked a 28-yard field goal, but the Jets added Smith's 89-yard kick return for a touchdown, followed by defensive end Trevor Pryce sacking Palmer in the endzone for a safety.

With the win, New York improved to 9–2. Smith (3 carries, 55 yards, TD, 3 kick returns, 122 return yards, TD) and cornerback Darrelle Revis (4 tackles, 1 sack) were named NFL Network's 2010 Pudding Pie Award winners.

=== Week 13: at New England Patriots ===
Week 13: New York Jets at New England Patriots – Game summary

Quarter	1	2	3	4	Total
Jets	0	3	0	0	3
Patriots	17	7	7	14	45

at Gillette Stadium, Foxborough, Massachusetts

- Date: December 6
- Game time: 8:30 pm EST
- Game weather: 27 °F (−2.8 °C) (Cloudy, cold, windy with snow flurries)
- Game attendance: 68,756
- Referee: Scott Green
- TV announcers (ESPN): Mike Tirico, Ron Jaworski, Jon Gruden, Michele Tafoya and Suzy Kolber
- http://www.nfl.com/gamecenter/2010120600/2010/REG13/jets@patriots

Game information

First quarter

- NE – Shayne Graham 41-yard field goal, Patriots 3–0, Drive: 9 plays, 52 yards, 4:03.
- NE – BenJarvus Green-Ellis 11-yard run (Shayne Graham kick), Patriots 10–0, Drive: 6 plays, 57 yards, 2:48.
- NE – Deion Branch 25-yard pass from Tom Brady (Shayne Graham kick), Patriots 17–0, Drive: 4 plays, 32 yards, 1:30.

Second quarter

- NYJ – Nick Folk 39-yard field goal, Patriots 17–3, Drive: 8 plays, 46 yards, 3:47.
- NE – Brandon Tate 4-yard pass from Tom Brady (Shayne Graham kick), Patriots 24–3, Drive: 7 plays, 67 yards, 3:59.

Third quarter

- NE – Wes Welker 18-yard pass from Tom Brady (Shayne Graham kick), Patriots 31–3, Drive: 8 plays, 93 yards, 4:35.

Fourth quarter

- NE – Aaron Hernandez 1-yard pass from Tom Brady (Shayne Graham kick), Patriots 38–3, Drive: 8 plays, 94 yards, 3:53.
- NE – BenJarvus Green-Ellis 5-yard run (Shayne Graham kick), Patriots 45–3, Drive: 6 plays, 28 yards, 3:26.

Top passers

- NYJ – Mark Sanchez – 17/33, 164 yards, 3 interceptions
- NE – Tom Brady – 21/39, 326 yards, 4 touchdowns

Top rushers

- NYJ – Shonn Greene – 13 rushes, 64 yards
- NE – BenJarvus Green-Ellis – 18 rushes, 72 yards, 2 touchdowns

Top receivers

- NYJ – Santonio Holmes – 7 receptions, 72 yards
- NE – Danny Woodhead – 4 receptions, 104 yards

Top tacklers

- NYJ – Sione Pouha – 6 tackles, 2 assists
- NE – Jerod Mayo – 6 tackles, 6 assists

Coming off their win over the Bengals on Thanksgiving, the Jets traveled to Foxborough in Monday Night Football game with the New England Patriots. In the first quarter, the Patriots took the early lead, with a 41-yard field goal from kicker Shayne Graham, followed by a 1-yard touchdown run from running back BenJarvus Green-Ellis and a 25-yard touchdown pass from quarterback Tom Brady to wide receiver Deion Branch. In the second quarter, the Jets got on the board, with a 39-yard field goal from kicker Nick Folk, in what would be the Jets' only score of the game. Later in the second quarter, the Patriots replied, with Brady throwing a 4-yard touchdown pass to wide receiver Brandon Tate. The Patriots continued their offensive onslaught in the third quarter, with Brady throwing an 18-yard touchdown pass to wide receiver Wes Welker. In the fourth quarter, Brady threw a 1-yard touchdown pass to tight end Aaron Hernandez, followed by a 5-yard touchdown run from Green-Ellis.

With the loss the Jets dropped to 9–3 and second place in the AFC East.

=== Week 14: vs. Miami Dolphins ===
Week 14: Miami Dolphins at New York Jets – Game summary

Quarter	1	2	3	4	Total
Dolphins	10	0	0	0	10
Jets	0	3	0	3	6

at New Meadowlands Stadium, East Rutherford, New Jersey

- Date: December 12
- Game time: 4:15 pm EST
- Game weather: 53 °F (11.7 °C) (Rain)
- Game attendance: 78,948
- Referee: Ron Winter
- TV announcers (CBS): Ian Eagle and Dan Fouts
- http://www.nfl.com/gamecenter/2010121210/2010/REG14/dolphins@jets

Game information

First quarter

- MIA – Dan Carpenter 47-yard field goal, Dolphins 3–0, Drive: 6 plays, 13 yards, 2:38
- MIA – Brandon Marshall 6-yard pass from Chad Henne, Dolphins 10–0, Drive: 6 plays, 26 yards, 2:55

Second quarter

- NYJ – Nick Folk 35-yard field goal, Dolphins 10–3, Drive: 7 plays, 21 yards, 2:49

Third quarter

Fourth quarter

- NYJ – Nick Folk 42-yard field goal, Dolphins 10–6, Drive: 12 plays, 69 yards, 5:14

Top passers

- MIA – Chad Henne – 5/18, 55 yards, 1 touchdown
- NYJ – Mark Sanchez – 17/44, 216 yards, 1 interception

Top rushers

- MIA – Ronnie Brown – 16 rushes, 55 yards
- NYJ – LaDainian Tomlinson – 19 rushes, 49 yards

Top receivers

- MIA – Anthony Fasano – 2 receptions, 33 yards
- NYJ – Jerricho Cotchery – 5 receptions, 69 yards

Top tacklers

- MIA – Karlos Dansby – 8 tackles, 1 assist, 1 sack, 1 forced fumble
- NYJ – Sione Pouha – 7 tackles, 3 assists, 1 sack

Hoping to rebound from their loss to the Patriots the Jets played on home ground for an AFC East rivalry match against the Dolphins. The Jets trailed early with kicker Dan Carpenter nailing a 47-yard field goal, followed by QB Chad Henne completing a 6-yard TD pass to WR Brandon Marshall. They tried to cut the lead but only came away with kicker Nick Folk hitting a 35 and a 42-yard field goal.

With the loss, the Jets fell to 9–4.

=== Week 15: at Pittsburgh Steelers ===
Week 15: New York Jets at Pittsburgh Steelers – Game summary

Quarter	1	2	3	4	Total
Jets	7	3	7	5	22
Steelers	0	10	7	0	17

at Heinz Field, Pittsburgh, Pennsylvania

- Date: December 19
- Game time: 4:15 pm EST
- Game weather: 24 °F (−4.4 °C) (Cloudy)
- Game attendance: 62,568
- Referee: Pete Morelli
- TV announcers (CBS): Jim Nantz and Phil Simms
- Recap

Game information

First quarter

- NYJ – Brad Smith 97-yard kickoff return (Nick Folk kick), Jets 7–0, Drive: 0 plays, 0 yards, 0:12.

Second quarter

- PIT – Matt Spaeth 9-yard pass from Ben Roethlisberger (Shaun Suisham kick), Tied 7–7, Drive: 16 plays, 96 yards, 8:12.
- NYJ – Nick Folk 25-yard field goal, Jets 10–7, Drive: 9 plays, 56 yards, 4:41.
- PIT – Shaun Suisham 42-yard field goal, Tied 10–10, Drive: 10 plays, 53 yards, 2:15.

Third quarter

- PIT – Rashard Mendenhall 2-yard run (Shaun Suisham kick), Steelers 17–10, Drive: 9 plays, 74 yards, 5:57.
- NYJ – Mark Sanchez 7-yard run (Nick Folk kick), Tied 17–17, Drive: 8 plays, 66 yards, 3:49.

Fourth quarter

- NYJ – Nick Folk 34-yard field goal, Jets 20–17, Drive: 13 plays, 50 yards, 6:47.
- NYJ – Mewelde Moore tackled in endzone by Jason Taylor for a safety, Jets 22–17.

Top passers

- NYJ – Mark Sanchez – 19/29, 170 yards
- PIT – Ben Roethlisberger – 23/44, 264 yards, 1 touchdown

Top rushers

- NYJ – LaDainian Tomlinson – 11 rushes, 49 yards
- PIT – Rashard Mendenhall – 17 rushes, 100 yards, 1 touchdown

Top receivers

- NYJ – Braylon Edwards – 8 receptions, 100 yards
- PIT – Mike Wallace – 7 receptions, 102 yards

Top tacklers

- NYJ – Drew Coleman – 9 tackles, 1 assist, 2 sacks, 2 forced fumbles
- PIT – Lawrence Timmons – 10 tackles, 3 assists

With the win, the Jets improved to 10–4.

=== Week 16: at Chicago Bears ===
Week 16: New York Jets at Chicago Bears – Game summary

Quarter	1	2	3	4	Total
Jets	0	24	7	3	34
Bears	10	7	21	0	38

at Soldier Field, Chicago, Illinois

- Date: December 26
- Game time: 1:00 pm EST/12:00 pm CST
- Game weather: 33 °F (0.6 °C) (Cloudy, occasional flurries, steady temperature)
- Game attendance: 62,310
- Referee: Walt Coleman
- TV announcers (CBS): Jim Nantz and Phil Simms
- Box Score Recap

Game information

First quarter

- CHI – Robbie Gould 37-yard field goal, Bears 3–0, Drive: 9 plays, 47 yards, 5:20.
- CHI – Matt Forte 22-yard run (Robbie Gould kick), Bears 10–0, Drive: 4 plays, 45 yards, 1:53.

Second quarter

- NYJ – Shonn Greene 3-yard run (Nick Folk kick), Bears 10–7, Drive: 8 plays, 80 yards, 4:58.
- NYJ – Dwight Lowery 20-yard interception return (Nick Folk kick), Jets 14–10.
- NYJ – LaDainian Tomlinson 3-yard run (Nick Folk kick), Jets 21–10, Drive: 6 plays, 36 yards, 2:39.
- CHI – Jay Cutler 2-yard run (Robbie Gould kick), Jets 21–17, Drive: 7 plays, 64 yards, 3:00.
- NYJ – Nick Folk 26-yard field goal, Jets 24–17, Drive: 9 plays, 59 yards, 2:32.

Third quarter

- CHI – Johnny Knox 40-yard pass from Jay Cutler (Robbie Gould kick), Tied 24–24, Drive: 1 plays, 40 yards, 0:08.
- CHI – Devin Hester 25-yard pass from Jay Cutler (Robbie Gould kick), Bears 31–24, Drive: 3 plays, 32 yards, 1:37.
- NYJ – Santonio Holmes 23-yard pass from Mark Sanchez (Nick Folk kick), Tied 31–31, Drive: 4 plays, 66 yards, 1:53.
- CHI – Johnny Knox 26-yard pass from Jay Cutler (Robbie Gould kick), Bears 38–31, Drive: 5 plays, 49 yards, 2:30.

Fourth quarter

- NYJ – Nick Folk 34-yard field goal, Bears 38–34, Drive: 12 plays, 51 yards, 6:14.

Top passers

- NYJ – Mark Sanchez – 24/37, 269 yards, 1 touchdown, 1 interception
- CHI – Jay Cutler – 13/25, 215 yards, 3 touchdowns, 1 interception

Top rushers

- NYJ – Shonn Greene – 12 rushes, 70 yards, 1 touchdown
- CHI – Matt Forté – 19 rushes, 113 yards, 1 touchdown

Top receivers

- NYJ – Dustin Keller – 7 receptions, 79 yards
- CHI – Johnny Knox – 4 receptions, 92 yards, 2 touchdowns

Top tacklers

- NYJ – David Harris, Calvin Pace, Darrelle Revis – 4 tackles
- CHI – Chris Harris – 10 tackles, 1 assist, 1 interception

Coming off their win over the Steelers the Jets played an interconference duel with the Bears. In the first quarter the Jets trailed early as kicker Robbie Gould got a 37-yard field goal, followed by Matt Forte getting a 22-yard TD run. The Jets pulled ahead with RB Shonn Greene getting a 3-yard TD run, followed by CB Dwight Lowery returning an interception 20 yards for a touchdown, followed by RB LaDainian Tomlinson getting a 3-yard TD run letting the Jets lead 21–10. The lead was narrowed as QB Jay Cutler scrambled 2 yards for a touchdown, but was soon extended as kicker Nick Folk made a 26-yard field goal. They trailed again with Cutler completing a 40 and a 25-yard TD pass to wide receivers Devin Hester and Johnny Knox respectively, but soon were able to tie the game with QB Mark Sanchez throwing a 23-yard TD pass to WR Santonio Holmes. The Bears escaped the tie with Cutler finding Knox again on a 26-yard TD pass. The Jets tried to come back, but only came away with a 34-yard field goal from Folk. When the Jets got the ball back, Sanchez threw a pass intended for Holmes, only to be intercepted by safety Chris Harris with 0:58 to go.

With the loss, the Jets fell to 10–5, but clinched a playoff berth when the Jaguars lost to the Redskins.

=== Week 17: vs. Buffalo Bills ===
Week 17: Buffalo Bills at New York Jets – Game summary

Quarter	1	2	3	4	Total
Bills	0	0	7	0	7
Jets	10	7	7	14	38

at New Meadowlands Stadium, East Rutherford, New Jersey

- Date: January 2
- Game time: 1:00 pm EST
- Game weather: 48 °F (8.9 °C) (Overcast)
- Game attendance: 79,019
- Referee: Carl Cheffers
- TV announcers (CBS): Gus Johnson and Steve Tasker

Game information

First quarter

Second quarter

Third quarter

Fourth quarter

Top passers

- BUF –
- NYJ –

Top rushers

- BUF –
- NYJ –

Top receivers

- BUF –
- NYJ –

Top tacklers

- BUF –
- NYJ –

The Jets’ sixteenth game was a division rivalry rematch against the Bills at home. The Jets commanded the first half with kicker Nick Folk making a 28-yard field goal, followed by CB Marquice Cole returning an interception 35 yards for a touchdown, then with QB Mark Brunell making a 17-yard TD pass to WR Santonio Holmes. Their offense broke down a bit as Brunell's next pass was intercepted by FS Jairus Byrd and returned 37 yards for a touchdown, but continued to score after Brunell found WR Braylon Edwards on a 52-yard TD pass. This was followed by QB Kellen Clemens scrambling 10 yards for a touchdown, then with RB John Conner getting a 16-yard TD run.

With the win, the Jets finish on an 11–5 record.

== Postseason ==
=== Schedule ===
Round	Date	Opponent (seed)	Result	Record	Venue	Recap
Wild Card	January 8, 2011	at Indianapolis Colts (3)	W 17–16	1–0	Lucas Oil Stadium	Recap
Divisional	January 16, 2011	at New England Patriots (1)	W 28–21	2–0	Gillette Stadium	Recap
AFC Championship	January 23, 2011	at Pittsburgh Steelers (2)	L 19–24	2–1	Heinz Field	Recap

=== Game summaries ===
==== AFC Wild Card Playoffs: at (3) Indianapolis Colts ====
AFC Wild Card Playoffs: (6) New York Jets at (3) Indianapolis Colts – Game summary

Quarter	1	2	3	4	Total
Jets	0	0	7	10	17
Colts	0	7	3	6	16

at Lucas Oil Stadium, Indianapolis, Indiana

- Date: January 8, 2011
- Game time: 8:00 pm EST
- Game weather: None (retractable roof closed)
- Game attendance: 65,332
- Referee: Gene Steratore
- TV announcers (NBC): Al Michaels, Cris Collinsworth, & Andrea Kremer
- Recap, Game Book

Game information

First quarter

- None

Second quarter

- IND – Pierre Garçon 57-yard pass from Peyton Manning, Colts 7–0, Drive: 5 plays, 80 yards, 2:44

Third quarter

- NYJ – LaDainian Tomlinson 1-yard run (Nick Folk kick), Tied 7–7, Drive: 10 plays, 63 yards, 5:12.
- IND – Adam Vinatieri 47-yard field goal, Colts 10–7, Drive: 9 plays, 45 yards, 4:45.

Fourth quarter

- NYJ – LaDainian Tomlinson 1-yard run (Nick Folk kick), Jets 14–10, Drive: 17 plays, 87 yards, 9:54.
- IND – Adam Vinatieri 32-yard field goal, Jets 14–13, Drive: 13 plays, 67 yards, 5:22.
- IND – Adam Vinatieri 50-yard field goal, Colts 16–14, Drive: 8 plays, 48 yards, 1:43.
- NYJ – Nick Folk 32-yard field goal, Jets 17–16, Drive: 5 plays, 40 yards, 0:53.

Top passers

- NYJ – Mark Sanchez – 18/31, 189 yards, 1 interception
- IND – Peyton Manning – 18/26, 225 yards, 1 touchdown

Top rushers

- NYJ – LaDainian Tomlinson – 16 rushes, 82 yards, 2 touchdowns
- IND – Joseph Addai – 13 rushes, 60 yards

Top receivers

- NYJ – Braylon Edwards – 4 receptions, 62 yards
- IND – Pierre Garçon – 5 receptions, 112 yards, 1 touchdown

Top tacklers

- NYJ – Eric Smith – 10 tackles
- IND – Jacob Lacey – 9 tackles

Entering the postseason as the AFC's sixth seed, the Jets began their playoff run at Lucas Oil Stadium for the AFC Wild Card Round against the third seeded Indianapolis Colts in a rematch of the 2009–10 AFC Championship Game. After a scoreless first quarter, New York trailed in the second quarter as Colts quarterback Peyton Manning completed a 57-yard touchdown pass to wide receiver Pierre Garçon.

The Jets tied the game in the third quarter with a 1-yard touchdown run from running back LaDainian Tomlinson, however Indianapolis immediately came back with a 47-yard Adam Vinatieri field goal. New York took the lead in the fourth quarter with another 1-yard touchdown run from Tomlinson, but the Colts regained the lead with Vinatieri nailing a 32-yard and a 50-yard field goal. However, the Jets prevailed in the end; as time expired, Nick Folk kicked the game-winning 32-yard field goal. This also ended up being Peyton Manning's last game as a Colt, as he would sit out the next season due to neck surgeries, and be released by the Colts then subsequently signed with the Denver Broncos.

With the win, New York improved their overall record to 12–5.

==== AFC Divisional Playoffs: at (1) New England Patriots ====
AFC Divisional Playoffs: (6) New York Jets at (1) New England Patriots – Game summary

Quarter	1	2	3	4	Total
Jets	0	14	0	14	28
Patriots	3	0	8	10	21

at Gillette Stadium, Foxborough, Massachusetts

- Date: January 16, 2011
- Game time: 4:30 pm EST
- Game weather: Clear and cold, 30 °F (−1 °C)
- Game attendance: 68,756
- Referee: Bill Leavy
- TV announcers (CBS): Jim Nantz & Phil Simms
- Recap, Game Book

Game information

First quarter

- NE – Shayne Graham 34-yard field goal, Patriots 3–0, Drive: 11 plays, 63 yards, 4:32.

Second quarter

- NYJ – LaDainian Tomlinson 7-yard pass from Mark Sanchez, Jets 7–3, Drive: 5 plays, 49 yards, 1:56
- NYJ – Braylon Edwards 15-yard pass from Mark Sanchez, Jets 14–3, Drive: 4 plays, 37 yards, 0:33

Third quarter

- NE – Alge Crumpler 2-yard pass from Tom Brady (Sammy Morris run successful), Jets 14–11, Drive: 8 plays, 80 yards, 3:51

Fourth quarter

- NYJ – Santonio Holmes 7-yard pass from Mark Sanchez, Jets 21–11, Drive: 5 plays, 75 yards, 2:13
- NE – Shayne Graham 35-yard field goal, Jets 21–14, Drive: 7 plays, 26 yards, 1:32.
- NYJ – Shonn Greene 16-yard run (Nick Folk kick), Jets 28–14, Drive: 2 plays, 20 yards, 0:16.
- NE – Deion Branch 13-yard pass from Tom Brady, Jets 28–21, Drive: 7 plays, 59 yards, 1:17

Top passers

- NYJ – Mark Sanchez – 16/25, 194 yards, 3 touchdowns
- NE – Tom Brady – 29/45, 299 yards, 2 touchdown, 1 interception

Top rushers

- NYJ – LaDainian Tomlinson – 17 rushes, 76 yards, 1 touchdown
- NE – Danny Woodhead – 14 rushes, 46 yards

Top receivers

- NYJ – Jerricho Cotchery – 5 receptions, 96 yards
- NE – Wes Welker – 7 receptions, 57 yards

Top tacklers

- NYJ – David Harris – 9 tackles, 3 assists
- NE – Jerod Mayo – 3 tackles, 3 assists

Coming off their win over the Colts, the Jets flew to Gillette Stadium for the AFC Divisional Round against the top-seeded New England Patriots, in Round 3 of their 2010 series. New York trailed in the first quarter as Patriots kicker Shayne Graham made a 34-yard field goal. The Jets took the lead in the second quarter as quarterback Mark Sanchez found running back LaDainian Tomlinson on a 7-yard touchdown pass. After a failed fake-punt attempt by New England, Sanchez connected with wide receiver Braylon Edwards on a 15-yard touchdown pass.

New England began to cut away at their deficit as quarterback Tom Brady completed a 2-yard touchdown pass to tight end Alge Crumpler (with a successful two-point conversion run from running back Sammy Morris). The Jets answered back when Mark Sanchez connected with Santionio Holmes in the corner of the endzone, extending the lead back to 21–11. The Patriots tried to rally as Graham got a 35-yard field goal, yet New York came right back with a 20-yard touchdown run from running back Shonn Greene. Afterwards, New England closed out the game as Brady completed a 13-yard touchdown pass to wide receiver Deion Branch.

With the win, the Jets improved to 13–5. The Jets defense set a franchise single-game postseason record by sacking Brady five times.

==== AFC Championship: at (2) Pittsburgh Steelers ====
AFC Championship: (6) New York Jets at (2) Pittsburgh Steelers – Game summary

Quarter	1	2	3	4	Total
Jets	0	3	7	9	19
Steelers	7	17	0	0	24

at Heinz Field, Pittsburgh, Pennsylvania

- Date: January 23, 2011
- Game time: 6:30 pm EST
- Game weather: Partly cloudy, 17 °F (−8 °C)
- Game attendance: 66,662
- Referee: Ed Hochuli
- TV announcers (CBS): Jim Nantz, Phil Simms & Steve Tasker
- Recap, Gamebook

Game information

First quarter

- PIT – Rashard Mendenhall 1-yard run (Shaun Suisham kick), Steelers 7–0, Drive: 15 plays, 66 yards, 9:06.

Second quarter

- PIT – Shaun Suisham 20-yard field goal, Steelers 10–0, Drive: 8 plays, 60 yards, 3:41.
- PIT – Ben Roethlisberger 2-yard run (Shaun Suisham kick), Steelers 17–0, Drive: 7 plays, 66 yards, 3:57.
- PIT – William Gay 19-yard fumble return (Shaun Suisham kick), Steelers 24–0
- NYJ – Nick Folk 42-yard field goal, Steelers 24–3, Drive: 7 plays, 44 yards, 1:04.

Third quarter

- NYJ – Santonio Holmes 45-yard pass from Mark Sanchez (Nick Folk kick), Steelers 24–10, Drive: 5 plays, 90 yards, 2:17

Fourth quarter

- NYJ – Ben Roethlisberger fumbled snap in the endzone and then tackled in the endzone by Mike DeVito for a safety, Steelers 24–12.
- NYJ – Jerricho Cotchery 4-yard pass from Mark Sanchez (Nick Folk kick), Steelers 24–19, Drive: 10 plays, 58 yards, 4:32

Top passers

- NYJ – Mark Sanchez – 20/33, 233 yards, 2 touchdowns
- PIT – Ben Roethlisberger – 10/19, 133 yards, 2 interceptions

Top rushers

- NYJ – Shonn Greene – 9 rushes, 52 yards
- PIT – Rashard Mendenhall – 27 rushes, 121 yards, 1 touchdown

Top receivers

- NYJ – Dustin Keller – 8 receptions, 64 yards
- PIT – Heath Miller – 2 receptions, 38 yards

Top tacklers

- NYJ – David Harris – 7 tackles, 2 assists
- PIT – Lawrence Timmons – 9 tackles, 1 assist

Coming off their win over the Patriots, the Jets flew to Heinz Field for the AFC Championship Game against the No. 2 Pittsburgh Steelers, in a rematch of their Week 15 game.

New York trailed in the first quarter as Steelers running back Rashard Mendenhall got a 1-yard touchdown run. Pittsburgh added onto their lead in the second quarter as kicker Shaun Suisham got a 20-yard field goal, followed by quarterback Ben Roethlisberger getting a 2-yard touchdown run, along with cornerback William Gay returning a fumble 19 yards for a touchdown. The Jets closed out the half with a 42-yard field goal from kicker Nick Folk.

New York began the third quarter with quarterback Mark Sanchez finding former Pittsburgh wide receiver Santonio Holmes on a 45-yard touchdown pass. Two drives later, the Jets got into red zone in the middle of the 4th quarter, but were held out of the end zone. The Jets tried to rally as Roethlisberger fumbled the snap in the endzone and then got tackled in the endzone by Mike DeVito for a safety, followed by Sanchez hooking up with wide receiver Jerricho Cotchery on a 4-yard touchdown pass. However, the Steelers held on to preserve the win.

With the loss, New York's season came to an end with an overall record of 13–6.

As of the 2025 season, this is the most recent playoff game played by the Jets.
