= Frank Summers (American football) =

American football player (born 1985)

No. 38, 44
- Position: Fullback

Personal information
- Born: September 6, 1985 (age 41); Oakland, California, U.S.
- Listed height: 5 ft 9 in (1.75 m)
- Listed weight: 248 lb (112 kg)

Career information
- High school: Skyline (Oakland)
- College: UNLV
- NFL draft: 2009: 5th round, 169th overall pick

Career history
- Pittsburgh Steelers (2009–2010); San Diego Chargers (2011)*; Buffalo Bills (2013–2014)
- * Offseason or practice squad member only

Career NFL statistics
- Receptions: 12
- Receiving yards: 88
- Receiving touchdowns: 1
- Rushing attempts: 18
- Rushing yards: 63
- Rushing touchdowns: 2
- Stats at Pro Football Reference

Frank Edward Summers (born September 6, 1985) is an American former professional football player who was a fullback and special teamer in the National Football League (NFL). He was selected in the fifth round of the 2009 NFL draft by the Pittsburgh Steelers. He played college football for the UNLV Rebels.

== College career ==
Nicknamed "the Tank" due to his build and powerful running style, Summers signed with the University of California, Berkeley out of high school. After redshirting the 2004 season at California, he transferred to Laney College in Oakland, where he played in 2005 and 2006. He was a member of the JC Athletic Bureau All-American first-team in 2005. He then chose UNLV over Southern California because the Rebels offered him a chance to remain at running back while the Trojans wanted him to move to fullback. Utah and Washington State also recruited him. An immediate starter for the Rebels as a junior, Summers started all 12 games, rushing for 928 yards and scoring six touchdowns in earning Mountain West Conference honorable mention accolades. His rushing total dropped to 740 yards in 2009, but he improved upon his scoring (eight touchdowns) and showed enough at the Texas vs The Nation game and in subsequent workouts to earn a late-round look.

== Professional career ==
Pre-draft measurables
Height	Weight	40-yard dash	10-yard split	20-yard split	20-yard shuttle	Three-cone drill	Vertical jump	Broad jump	Bench press
5 ft 9 1/8 in (1.76 m)	241 lb (109 kg)	4.63 s	1.58 s	2.67 s	4.35 s	7.23 s	34.5 in (0.88 m)	9 ft 4 in (2.84 m)	30 reps
All values from Pro Day

=== Pittsburgh Steelers ===
Summers was selected in the fifth round of the 2009 NFL draft by the Pittsburgh Steelers.

After playing the first two games of the 2009 season at fullback, Summers was placed on injured reserve for the rest of the season.

During the 2010 preseason, he practiced at both halfback and fullback. Summers was released by the Pittsburgh Steelers on September 4, 2010.

He was signed to the Steelers' practice squad on September 6, 2010.

=== San Diego Chargers ===
On February 16, 2011, Summers was signed by the San Diego Chargers. He was released on September 3, 2011.

=== Buffalo Bills ===
Summers signed with the Buffalo Bills on April 18, 2013. He scored his first touchdown against the New York Jets, on November 17, 2013. On December 16, 2014 the Buffalo Bills announced they had released Summers.

== Personal ==
His second cousin, Martin Tevaseu, is of Samoan descent and played defensive tackle in the NFL. After retiring from football, Summers completed his bachelor's degree at UNLV in 2016.
