= Eric Smith (safety) =

American football player and coach (born 1983)

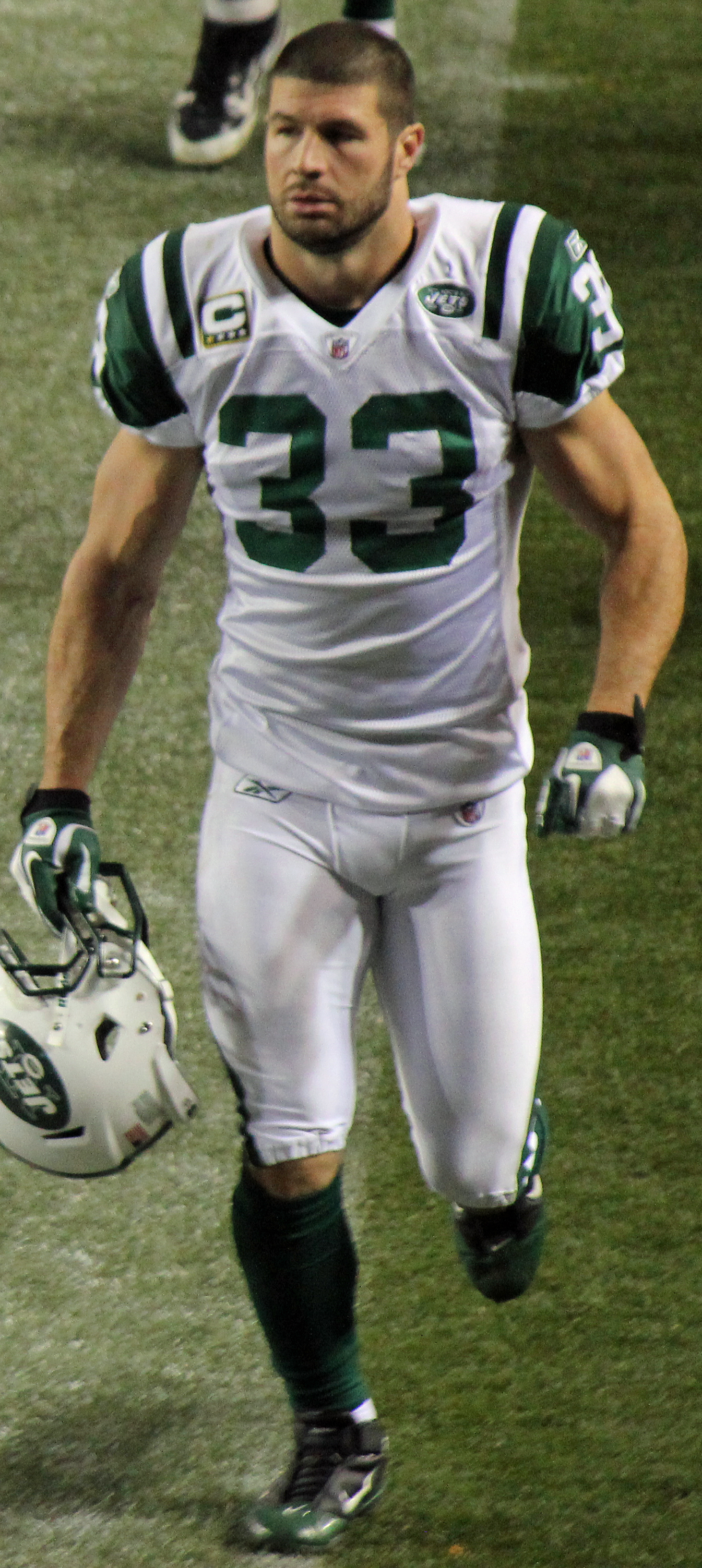
- Smith with the New York Jets in 2011

No. 33
- Position: Safety

Personal information
- Born: March 17, 1983 (age 43); Columbus, Ohio, U.S.
- Listed height: 6 ft 1 in (1.85 m)
- Listed weight: 207 lb (94 kg)

Career information
- High school: Groveport Madison (Groveport, Ohio)
- College: Michigan State
- NFL draft: 2006: 3rd round, 97th overall pick

Career history

Playing
- New York Jets (2006–2012)

Coaching
- New York Jets (2014) Seasonal intern; Buffalo Bills (2015–2016) Assistant special teams

Awards and highlights
- Second-team All-Big Ten (2005)

Career NFL statistics
- Total tackles: 308
- Sacks: 3.5
- Fumble recoveries: 4
- Pass deflections: 27
- Interceptions: 6
- Stats at Pro Football Reference

Eric Smith (born March 17, 1983) is an American former professional football player who was a safety for the New York Jets of the National Football League (NFL). He played college football for the Michigan State Spartans and was selected by the Jets in the third round of the 2006 NFL draft.

== Professional career ==
Pre-draft measurables
Height	Weight	Arm length	Hand span	40-yard dash	10-yard split	20-yard split	20-yard shuttle	Three-cone drill	Vertical jump	Broad jump	Bench press
6 ft 1 in (1.85 m)	209 lb (95 kg)	30 in (0.76 m)	10 1/4 in (0.26 m)	4.67 s	1.65 s	2.64 s	3.97 s	6.89 s	40 in (1.02 m)	10 ft 7 in (3.23 m)	21 reps
All values from NFL Combine/Pro Day

Smith was selected in the third round with the 97th overall pick in the 2006 NFL draft. Smith had been rising on many draft boards in the weeks leading up to the draft as he was praised for his instincts and physicality on the field. The Jets signed Smith to a contract on July 21, 2006. Smith recorded 27 tackles in 15 games during his rookie season. He also added two interceptions, recording his first against former Cleveland Browns quarterback Charlie Frye.

In 15 games in 2007, Smith recorded 40 tackles and 5 passes defensed.

On September 28, 2008, Smith was fined $50,000 and suspended one game because of a helmet-to-helmet collision with Anquan Boldin of the Arizona Cardinals, which caused Boldin to be hospitalized. Smith finished the season with 32 tackles, 4 passes defensed and an interception.

Smith was primarily utilized as a back up defender and on special teams in 2009. In 16 games, he recorded a career high 48 tackles, 6 pass defensed and an interception.

In the team's week two matchup against the New England Patriots in 2010, Smith delivered a hit to wide receiver Wes Welker and was flagged for hitting a defenseless receiver. Smith apologized to Welker during the game, which Welker accepted, and was later fined $7,500 by the league. He was a special teams captain in 2010.

Smith re-signed with Jets on July 30, 2011, to a three-year deal worth $7.5 million. He was a special teams captain in 2011.

Smith suffered a medial collateral ligament (MCL) injury on his left knee during the August 10, 2012, preseason loss to the Cincinnati Bengals. An MRI came back negative. Smith was eventually knocked out for the entire 2012 season. He was released from the Jets on February 19, 2013.

== NFL career statistics ==
Legend
**Bold**	Career high

=== Regular season ===
Year	Team	Games		Tackles					Interceptions					Fumbles			
Year	Team	GP	GS	Cmb	Solo	Ast	Sck	TFL	Int	Yds	TD	Lng	PD	FF	FR	Yds	TD
2006	NYJ	15	0	29	20	9	0.0	1	**2**	1	0	1	2	0	0	0	0
2007	NYJ	15	4	40	26	14	0.0	0	0	0	0	0	5	0	**1**	0	0
2008	NYJ	9	6	32	19	13	0.0	1	1	**6**	0	**6**	4	0	**1**	0	0
2009	NYJ	**16**	4	48	38	10	0.0	4	1	0	0	0	**6**	0	0	0	0
2010	NYJ	13	6	54	44	10	1.0	1	0	0	0	0	2	0	0	0	0
2011	NYJ	**16**	**14**	**89**	**66**	**23**	**2.5**	**5**	1	2	0	2	4	0	**1**	0	0
2012	NYJ	12	2	16	12	4	0.0	1	1	5	0	5	4	0	**1**	0	0
		96	36	308	225	83	3.5	13	6	14	0	6	27	0	4	0	0

=== Playoffs ===
Year	Team	Games		Tackles					Interceptions					Fumbles			
Year	Team	GP	GS	Cmb	Solo	Ast	Sck	TFL	Int	Yds	TD	Lng	PD	FF	FR	Yds	TD
2006	NYJ	1	0	5	5	0	0.0	0	0	0	0	0	0	0	0	0	0
2009	NYJ	**3**	0	5	3	2	0.0	0	0	0	0	0	0	0	0	0	0
2010	NYJ	**3**	**3**	**26**	**21**	**5**	0.0	**1**	0	0	0	0	**4**	0	0	0	0
		7	3	36	29	7	0.0	1	0	0	0	0	4	0	0	0	0

== Coaching career ==
Smith was hired by the New York Jets on February 10, 2014, as a seasonal intern coach.

Smith was hired by the Buffalo Bills to be the assistant special teams coach on January 15, 2015. He served two seasons in Buffalo on Rex Ryan's staff before being dismissed by new coach Sean McDermott.

== Lawsuit Against NFL ==
In February 2023, Smith and nine other former players filed a lawsuit against the NFL disability board in United States Federal Court, stating they had been unfairly denied disability claims. Smith stated that he had suffered thirteen documented traumatic brain injuries and had been denied disability compensation for his “head, neck, and lumbar spine impairments” and “marked decreased shoulder range of motion, rotator cuff weakness, and moderate to severe shoulder arthritis".
