= Sione Po'uha =

American football player and coach (born 1979)

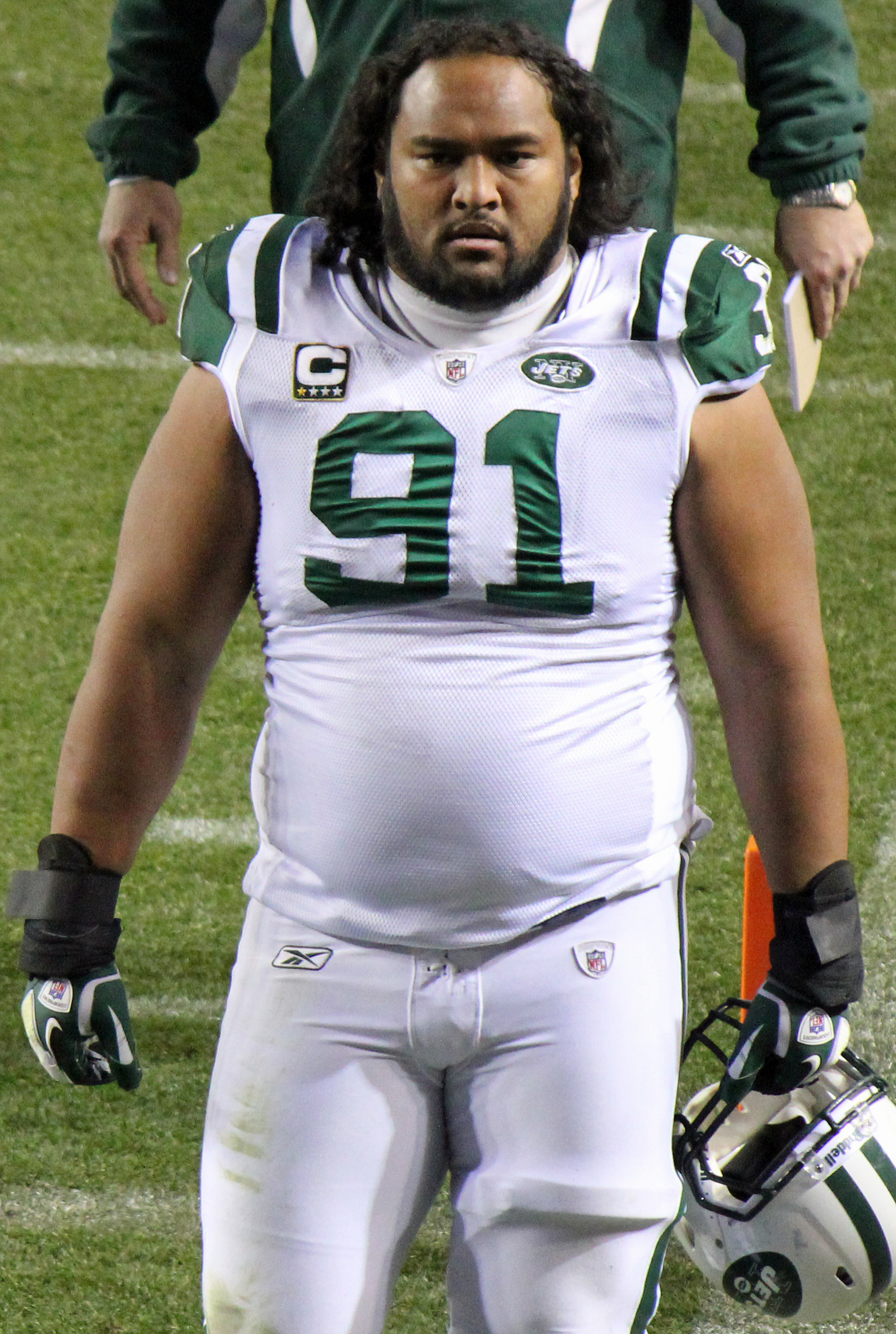

No. 91 – BYU Cougars
- Title: Defensive tackles coach

Personal information
- Born: February 3, 1979 (age 47); Salt Lake City, Utah, U.S.
- Listed height: 6 ft 3 in (1.91 m)
- Listed weight: 325 lb (147 kg)

Career information
- High school: Salt Lake City (UT) East
- College: Utah
- NFL draft: 2005: 3rd round, 88th overall pick

Career history

Playing
- New York Jets (2005–2012)

Coaching
- Utah (2015–2016) Student-assistant coach; Utah (2017) Director of football player development; Navy (2018) Defensive tackles coach; Utah (2019–2021) Defensive line coach; BYU (2023–2025) Defensive tackles coach; BYU (2026-present) Associate head coach/defensive line

Awards and highlights
- First-team All-MW (2004)

Career NFL statistics
- Total tackles: 263
- Sacks: 4.5
- Forced fumbles: 1
- Fumble recoveries: 5
- Stats at Pro Football Reference

Sione Sonasi "Bo" Po'uha (/siˈoʊni boʊˈuːhə/ see-OH-nee boh-OO-hə; born February 3, 1979) is an American football coach and former defensive tackle. He is currently the associate head coach and defensive line coach for Brigham Young University. He previously served as the defensive line coach at the University of Utah, for whom he played college football. He is an active member of the Church of Jesus Christ of Latter-day Saints.

== Early life ==
Po'uha began playing football at the young age of nine. He attended East High School in Salt Lake City, Utah, where he was a two-year first-team all-region player and captained East High's state championship team in 1996. He also earned USA Today honorable mention All-American honors as senior in 1996 and was a Deseret News and Salt Lake Tribune first-team all-state selection. Pouha signed a letter of intent with Utah in 1997, then left on a Mormon mission to Pittsburgh.

== College career ==
In his senior season at Utah, Po'uha earned All-Mountain West Conference first-team honors and was named USA Today All-America honorable mention after starting ten games, recording 36 tackles, four passes defended and one interception, and helped lead Urban Meyer's Utes to the 2005 Fiesta Bowl. Po'uha had never considered playing beyond the college level; however, during his senior season he changed his mind after receiving a phone call from an agent.

== Career ==
=== New York Jets ===
==== 2005 ====
Po'uha, who was considered a "project" player, was drafted by the New York Jets in the third round of the 2005 NFL draft. Pouha appeared in fourteen games as a rookie, recording ten tackles and one pass defended.

==== 2006 ====
Following his rookie season, Po'uha suffered a torn ACL on the fourth day of training camp and was subsequently knocked out for the entire 2006 football year.

==== 2007 ====
Motivated following his ACL injury which eliminated him for all of 2006, Po'uha played in all sixteen games during the season, starting one game. He recorded 39 tackles and had one pass defended.

==== 2008 ====
Po'uha once again appeared in all of the team's sixteen matchups, recording 23 tackles, and recorded his first half-sack of his career against New England Patriots quarterback Matt Cassel.

==== 2009 ====
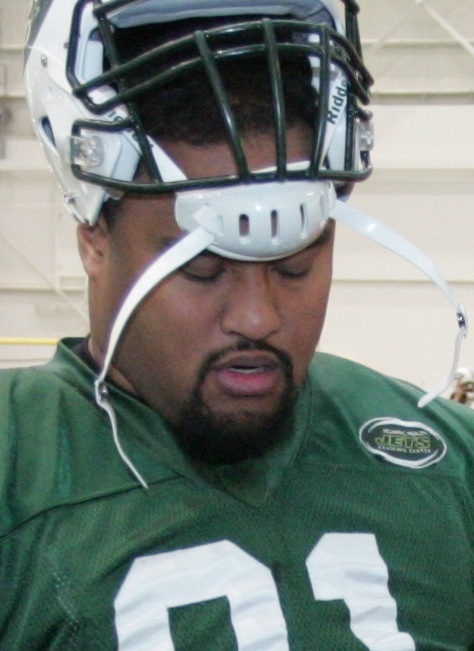
Pouha in 2009

Po'uha went into the 2009 season as the back-up defensive tackle. Six games into the season, the Jets lost Pro Bowl starter Kris Jenkins who suffered a torn ACL. The injury would thrust Po'uha into the spotlight as he became the team's starting nose tackle, starting the team's next thirteen games. Po'uha recorded multiple career highs, starting a career-high fourteen games and making a career 61 tackles, 34 of which were solo. Po'uha and teammate Mike DeVito helped improve the rushing defense from twenty-first to fourth overall in the NFL. Pouha and the team entered the postseason until falling against the Indianapolis Colts in the AFC Championship.

==== 2010 ====
Po'uha started the first game of the 2010 season alongside a returning Kris Jenkins. Six plays into the team's Monday night home opener against the Baltimore Ravens, Jenkins once again suffered a season-ending torn ACL. Pouha, again, assumed Jenkins' role as nose tackle alongside teammates Mike DeVito and Howard Green. Pouha was considered to be an excellent run-stopper and, as the season progressed, the team liked to see Pouha more involved in pass-rushing and getting to the quarterback. Pouha and the Jets made the postseason for the second straight year but lost to the Pittsburgh Steelers in the AFC Championship.

==== 2011 ====
In Week 14 of the 2011 NFL season, Po'uha tackled running back Jackie Battle in the end zone for a safety vs the Kansas City Chiefs. The Jets finished 8-8 that year.

==== 2012 ====
Po'uha was diagnosed with a back strain during the 2012 season and missed some games because of it. The Jets finished with a 6–10 record that season. Po'uha was released by the Jets on March 12, 2013.

== NFL career statistics ==
Legend
**Bold**	Career high

=== Regular season ===
Year	Team	Games		Tackles					Interceptions					Fumbles			
Year	Team	GP	GS	Cmb	Solo	Ast	Sck	TFL	Int	Yds	TD	Lng	PD	FF	FR	Yds	TD
2005	NYJ	14	0	9	7	2	0.0	0	0	0	0	0	1	0	0	0	0
2007	NYJ	**16**	1	40	35	5	0.0	0	0	0	0	0	1	0	0	0	0
2008	NYJ	**16**	0	23	16	7	0.5	1	0	0	0	0	1	0	0	0	0
2009	NYJ	**16**	14	45	33	12	0.0	3	0	0	0	0	1	0	0	0	0
2010	NYJ	**16**	**15**	**59**	**41**	**18**	**2.0**	3	0	0	0	0	**3**	0	**3**	**2**	0
2011	NYJ	**16**	**15**	58	**41**	17	1.0	**5**	0	0	0	0	**3**	**1**	2	0	0
2012	NYJ	12	10	29	20	9	1.0	1	0	0	0	0	1	0	0	0	0
		106	55	263	193	70	4.5	13	0	0	0	0	11	1	5	2	0

=== Playoffs ===
Year	Team	Games		Tackles					Interceptions					Fumbles			
Year	Team	GP	GS	Cmb	Solo	Ast	Sck	TFL	Int	Yds	TD	Lng	PD	FF	FR	Yds	TD
2009	NYJ	**3**	**3**	7	6	1	0.0	0	0	0	0	0	0	0	0	0	0
2010	NYJ	**3**	**3**	**14**	**7**	**7**	**1.0**	**2**	0	0	0	0	0	0	0	0	0
		6	6	21	13	8	1.0	2	0	0	0	0	0	0	0	0	0

=== Coaching career ===
Po'uha began his coaching career at the University of Utah as a student-assistant coach in 2015 and 2016, followed by being the director of football player development in 2017. In 2018, he became the defensive tackles coach at the United States Naval Academy.

After one season at Navy, he returned to Utah as the defensive line coach for 2019. In early 2022 following the 2022 Rose Bowl Po'uha announced on he would be retiring from coaching. For the 2023 season, Po'uha chose to return to coaching after being hired at Brigham Young University as their defensive tackles coach. On January 7, 2026, Po'uha was promoted to become BYU's associate head coach in addition to his duties coaching the defensive tackles.

== Personal life ==
Po'uha was born to Sonasi and Susana Po'uha. He married his college sweetheart, Keiti Kaufusi Po'uha, while he was still attending the University of Utah. The couple have four children, two sons and two daughters. Pouha's parents were immigrants from Tonga.

Po'uha majored in behavior science and health.

Po'uha created a beverage business named Bula. Po'uha has described the beverage as a "relaxation drink" that is a combination of kava and valerian root. The drink is currently sold online and in stores in northern California. For a time Po'uha served as bishop of the Bountiful 6th Ward, a Tongan-language ward in Utah. He has also served as a seminary and institute teacher in The Church of Jesus Christ of Latter-day Saints.
