= Mike DeVito =

American football player (born 1984)

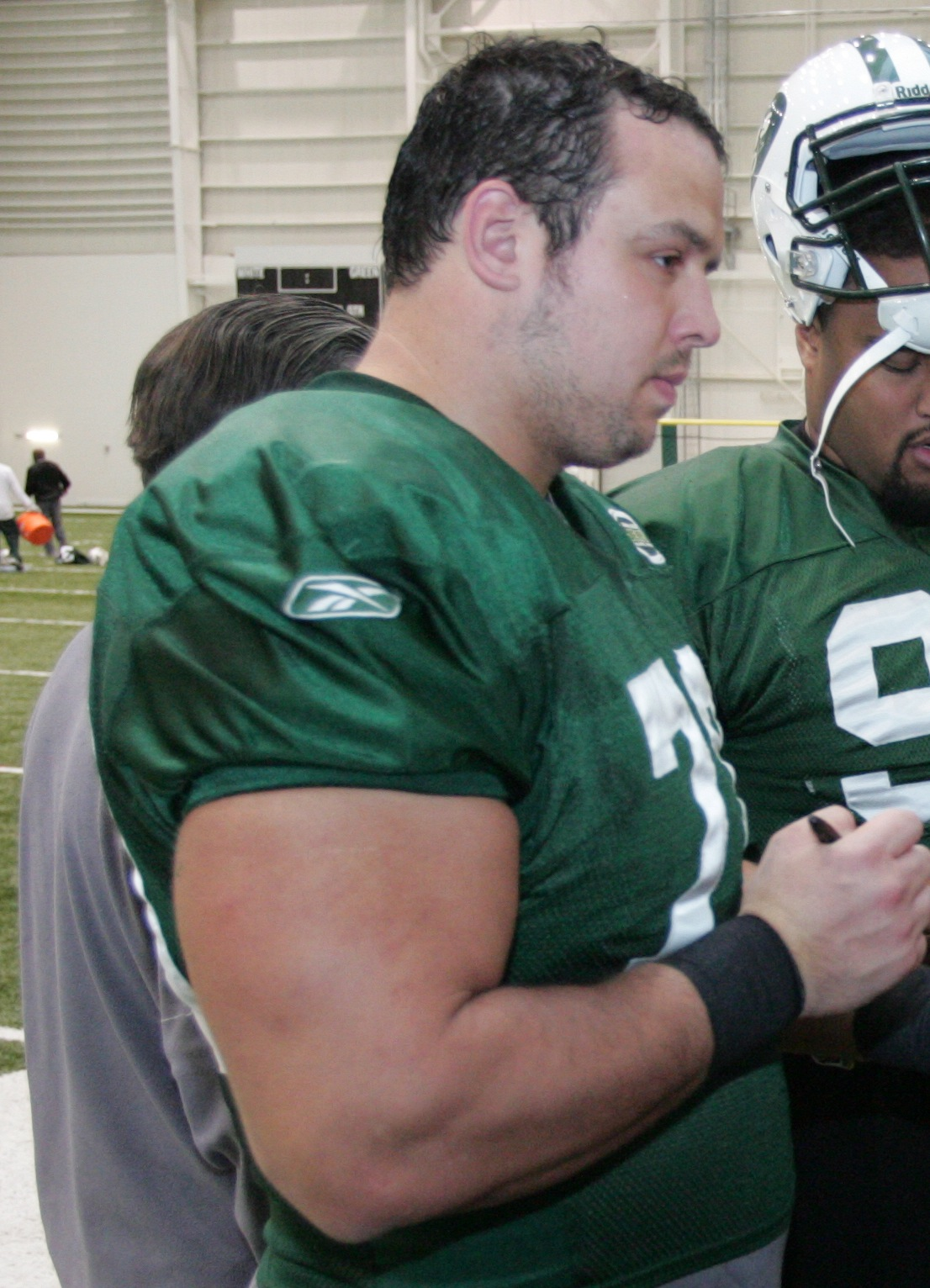
- DeVito with the New York Jets in 2009

No. 70
- Position: Defensive end

Personal information
- Born: June 10, 1984 (age 42); New York, New York, U.S.
- Listed height: 6 ft 3 in (1.91 m)
- Listed weight: 298 lb (135 kg)

Career information
- High school: Nauset Regional (Eastham, Massachusetts)
- College: Maine
- NFL draft: 2007: undrafted

Career history
- New York Jets (2007–2012); Kansas City Chiefs (2013–2015)

Awards and highlights
- First-team All-Atlantic 10 (2006); Second-team All-Atlantic 10 (2005)

Career NFL statistics
- Total tackles: 250
- Sacks: 5.5
- Forced fumbles: 6
- Fumble recoveries: 3
- Stats at Pro Football Reference

Michael Ralph DeVito (born June 10, 1984) is an American former professional football player who was a defensive end in the National Football League (NFL). He played college football for the Maine Black Bears. He played in the NFL for the New York Jets from 2007 to 2012, and then the Kansas City Chiefs from 2013 to 2015.

== Early life ==
DeVito attended Nauset Regional High School in Eastham, Massachusetts, playing tight end and defensive end from 1999 to 2002. DeVito also was a member of the track and field team.

== College career ==
DeVito played college football for the University of Maine. He finished his career at Maine with 112 total tackles and 16 sacks and was team captain his senior season. He earned All-Atlantic 10 honors at nose tackle for the second time after finishing the 2006 with 28 tackles and 7 sacks. In 2005, he was named to the Second-team All-Atlantic 10 after starting all 11 games at one of the defensive tackle spots recorded 34 tackles (20 solo), a team-leading 12.0 tackles for loss, 6.5 sacks, forced one fumble and recovered another. In 2004, he started all 11 games at nose tackle and made 35 tackles (16 solo) and 2.5 tackles for loss, and recorded a sack. In 2003 as a redshirt freshman he played in 10 games, with 15 total tackles, 3.5 tackles for loss, 1.5 sacks and one interception.

== Professional career ==
Pre-draft measurables
Height	Weight	40-yard dash	20-yard shuttle	Three-cone drill	Vertical jump	Broad jump	Bench press
6 ft 3 in (1.91 m)	298 lb (135 kg)	4.87 s	4.53 s	7.50 s	33 in (0.84 m)	9 ft 0 in (2.74 m)	31 reps
All values from Maine Pro Day

=== New York Jets ===
==== 2007 season ====
He signed as an undrafted free agent on May 12, 2007, and won a roster spot over veterans Bobby Hamilton and Kimo Von Oelhoffen. He made his NFL debut in Week 12 against the Dallas Cowboys and notched two solo tackles in a Week 17 victory over the Kansas City Chiefs. DeVito finished the season with 5 total tackles 3 of which were solo tackles. DeVito appeared in a total of seven games.

==== 2008 season ====
DeVito saw substantially more playing time appearing in all 16 games and recording at least one tackle in 14 games. DeVito assisted on his first NFL sack in Week 14 vs the San Francisco 49ers. The next week he registered a career-high 4 tackles in a victory over the Buffalo Bills. DeVito finished the season with a career-high 24 total tackles with 15 solo tackles.

==== 2009 season ====
In early September DeVito signed a 3-year contract extension to remain with the Jets through 2012. DeVito lived up to his contract and had his best season registering a career-high 28 tackles. In Week 1 DeVito recorded his first career fumble recovery against the Houston Texans. DeVito had a career-high 6 total tackles (including 4 solo tackles) in Week 11 against the New England Patriots. In only his second career playoff game DeVito took down Philip Rivers to record his first full sack in a victory over the San Diego Chargers.

==== 2010 season ====
Prior to the injury to nose tackle Kris Jenkins, DeVito was named the starter on defense and has received constant praise from head coach Rex Ryan alongside teammate Sione Pouha. DeVito was a fixture on the Jets defensive line for the entire 2010 season as well as the Jets three playoff games. DeVito received very high praise from ESPN.com's Jets insider Rich Cimini and was cited as "the most under-appreciated player on the team" as well as being regarded as a "keeper, for sure".

In the AFC Championship Game against the Steelers DeVito was credited with a safety when Ben Roethlisberger missed a snap which was ruled a fumble and then the Steelers recovered the ball in the endzone for a safety which made the score 24–12 in front of the Steelers but the Jets would lose the game 24–19.

==== 2011 season ====
DeVito started on the defensive line alongside Sione Pouha and Muhammad Wilkerson. DeVito racked up 34 tackles, 2 forced fumbles, and 1 sack over 12 games (11 starts). In Week 1, DeVito forced a Tony Romo fumble in the fourth quarter, helping to secure an opening-week Jets victory. DeVito later stated that this play was the most memorable of his career.

==== 2012 season ====
As Pouha was strained by a back injury, Devito played nose tackle for part of the 2012 season. The Jets struggled all season and finished with a 6–10 record.

=== Kansas City Chiefs ===
On March 12, 2013 DeVito signed a three-year deal worth $12.6 million with the Kansas City Chiefs. Following a torn Achilles tendon suffered in a week 1 game against the Tennessee Titans in 2014, DeVito was placed on injured reserve ending his season.

On March 16, 2015, DeVito restructured his contract to save the Chiefs $2.5 million in cap room.

=== Retirement ===
DeVito announced his retirement on April 11, 2016.

=== Career statistics ===
Year	Team	Games	Combined tackles	Tackles	Assisted tackles	Sacks	Forced fumbles	Fumble recoveries	Fumble return yards	Interceptions	Interception return yards	Yards per interception return	Longest Reception	Interceptions returned for touchdown	Passes defended
2007	NYJ	7	5	3	2	0.0	0	0	0	0	0	0	0	0	0
2008	NYJ	16	24	15	9	0.5	0	0	0	0	0	0	0	0	0
2009	NYJ	15	28	20	8	0.0	0	3	7	0	0	0	0	0	0
2010	NYJ	16	59	34	25	0.0	2	0	0	0	0	0	0	0	1
2011	NYJ	12	34	27	7	1.0	2	0	0	0	0	0	0	0	0
2012	NYJ	16	52	27	25	1.0	2	0	0	0	0	0	0	0	0
2013	KC	14	28	18	10	0.0	0	0	0	0	0	0	0	0	1
2014	KC	1	1	0	1	0.0	0	0	0	0	0	0	0	0	1
2015	KC	13	19	13	6	3.0	0	0	0	0	0	0	0	0	0
Total	Total	110	250	157	93	5.5	6	3	0	0	0	0	0	0	3

== Personal life ==
DeVito married his college sweetheart, Jessie Martin, in 2010. He received a Masters in Philosophical Apologetics from Houston Baptist University. He is a PhD student in philosophy at the University of Birmingham, UK.
