= Emanuel Cook =

American football player (born 1988)

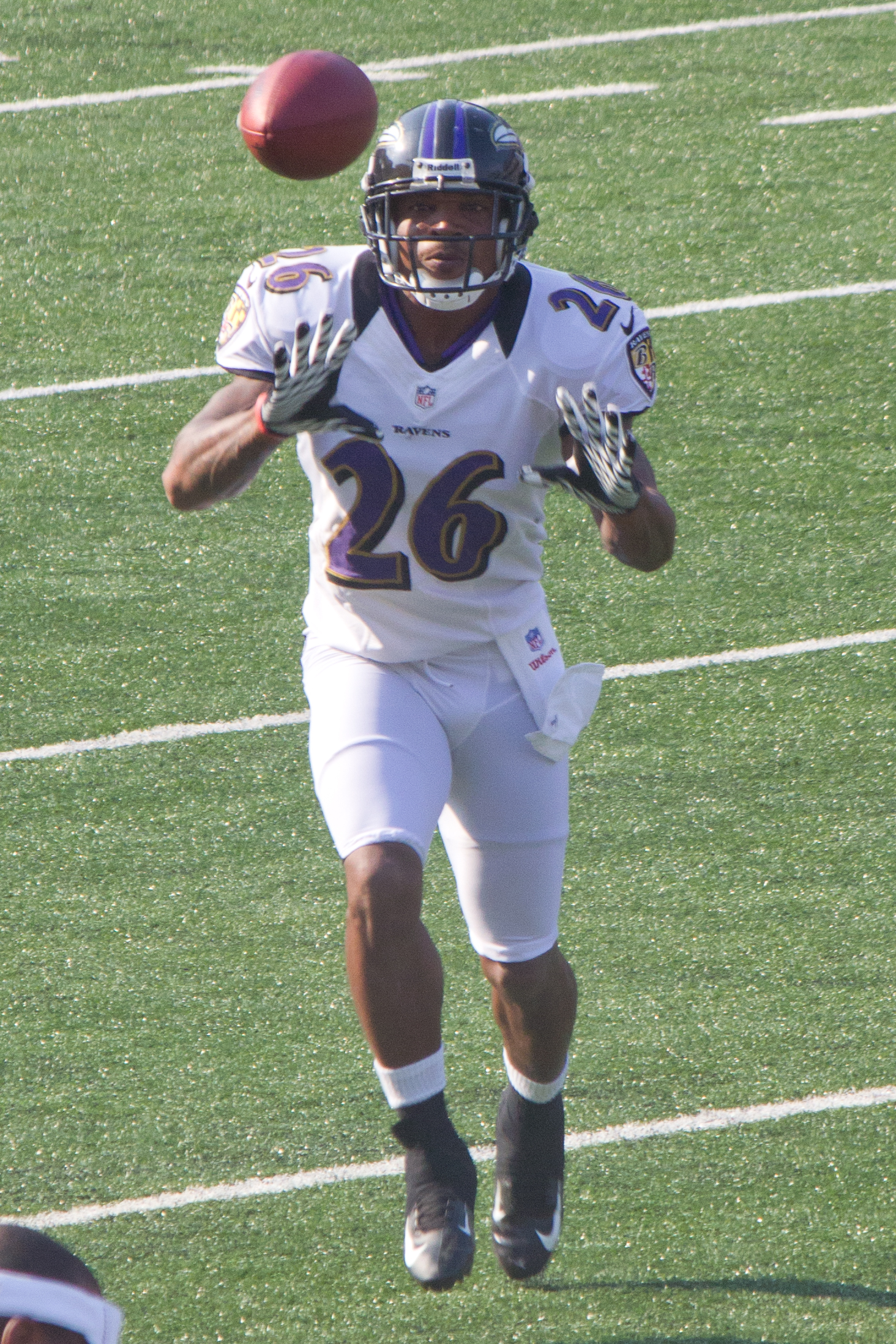
- Cook at Ravens M&T Bank Stadium practice in August 2012

No. 27, 37, 21, 26, 24
- Position: Safety

Personal information
- Born: January 20, 1988 (age 38); West Palm Beach, Florida, U.S.
- Listed height: 5 ft 10 in (1.78 m)
- Listed weight: 200 lb (91 kg)

Career information
- High school: Palm Beach Gardens Community (Palm Beach Gardens, Florida)
- College: South Carolina
- NFL draft: 2009: undrafted

Career history
- New York Jets (2009)*; Tampa Bay Buccaneers (2009–2010)*; New York Jets (2010)*; Hartford Colonials (2010); New York Jets (2010–2011); Baltimore Ravens (2011–2012); Orlando Predators (2015–2016); Tampa Bay Storm (2017)*
- * Offseason or practice squad member only

Awards and highlights
- Super Bowl champion (XLVII); 2× Second-team All-SEC (2007, 2008); Freshman All-SEC (2006)

Career NFL statistics
- Total tackles: 10
- Forced fumbles: 1
- Stats at Pro Football Reference

Career AFL statistics
- Total tackles: 130.5
- Forced fumbles: 3
- Pass deflections: 14
- Interceptions: 4
- Stats at ArenaFan.com

Emanuel Cook (born January 20, 1988) is an American former professional football player who was a safety in the National Football League (NFL). He played college football for the South Carolina Gamecocks and was signed by the New York Jets as an undrafted free agent in 2009. Cook was also a member of the Tampa Bay Buccaneers, Hartford Colonials, and Baltimore Ravens.

== Early life ==
Cook graduated from Palm Beach Gardens Community High School where he rushed for 2,027 yards and 27 touchdowns as a senior and was recognized as the South Florida Sun-Sentinel Player of the Year for large schools. He led his team to the Class 6A state title as a senior, marking the first state championship in school history. Cook ran for 373 yards and five touchdowns in a game against Atlantic, busted a 99-yard run vs. Lake Worth in the playoffs, and rushed for 243 yards and four scores in the state title game.

== College career ==
In 2008 Cook was the team's leading tackler but was declared academically ineligible for the Outback Bowl. His 2008 totals were 97 tackles (62 solo) and one interception. In 2007, he earned second-team All-SEC honors by the SEC coaches, the Associated Press, and Rivals.com. He led the team with 92 tackles, including 77 solos, including eight for losses. He also had 4 sacks, 3 interceptions, 5 passes broken up and forced 2 fumbles. In 2006, he earned freshman All-SEC honors by both the league's coaches and the Sporting News and tied for third on the team in tackles with 47, including 40 solo stops and five tackles for loss, despite playing only 10 games.

== Professional career ==
=== Pre-draft ===
Pre-draft measurables
Height	Weight	40-yard dash	Vertical jump	Broad jump	Bench press
5 ft 10 in (1.78 m)	197 lb (89 kg)	4.57 s	35 in (0.89 m)	9 ft 8 in (2.95 m)	18 reps
All values from NFL Combine.

=== New York Jets ===
Cook was signed by the New York Jets as an undrafted free agent and then released prior to the 2009 NFL season.

=== Tampa Bay Buccaneers ===
Cook was signed to the Tampa Bay Buccaneers' practice squad on November 11, 2009. On January 5, 2010, he was signed to a reserve/future contract. He was waived on June 18.

=== New York Jets (second stint) ===
Cook was re-signed by the New York Jets on July 29, 2010. Cook was then waived by the team on September 3, 2010.

=== Hartford Colonials ===
Cook was signed by the Hartford Colonials of the United Football League on September 16, 2010.

=== New York Jets (third stint) ===
Cook was re-signed by the Jets on December 8, 2010 to a three-year contract following injuries to safeties Jim Leonhard and James Ihedigbo. Cook was waived on November 28, 2011.

=== Baltimore Ravens ===
Cook was claimed off waivers by the Baltimore Ravens on November 29, 2011.

=== Orlando Predators ===
On April 28, 2015, Cook was assigned to the Orlando Predators of the Arena Football League. On January 5, 2016, Cook was placed on recallable reassignment. On March 30, 2016, Cook was assigned to the Predators once again.

=== Tampa Bay Storm ===
On October 14, 2016, Cook was assigned to the Tampa Bay Storm in the dispersal draft.
