= Martin Tevaseu =

American football player (born 1987)

No. 95, 68
- Position: Nose tackle

Personal information
- Born: October 7, 1987 (age 39); Oakland, California, U.S.
- Listed height: 6 ft 1 in (1.85 m)
- Listed weight: 310 lb (141 kg)

Career information
- High school: Anderson Valley (Boonville, California)
- College: UNLV
- NFL draft: 2010: undrafted

Career history
- Cleveland Browns (2010)*; New York Jets (2010–2011); Indianapolis Colts (2012)
- * Offseason or practice squad member only

Career NFL statistics
- Total tackles: 13
- Stats at Pro Football Reference

Martin Tauamanu Tevaseu (/ˌteɪvəˈseɪjuː/ TAY-və-SAY-yoo; born October 7, 1987) is an American former professional football player who was a nose tackle in the National Football League (NFL). He played college football for the UNLV Rebels. He signed with the Cleveland Browns in 2010 as an undrafted free agent.

== Early life ==
Born in Oakland, Tevaseu was raised in Boonville, California, where he attended Anderson Valley High School. His parents are of Samoan descent. He signed a letter of intent to play college football for the Arizona State Sun Devils, but suffered a severe knee injury during practice. He played at Santa Rosa Junior College before transferring to University of Nevada, Las Vegas.

== Professional career ==
=== Cleveland Browns ===
Tevaseu was not selected in the 2010 NFL draft. Even after running a 4.96 40 at his pro day. After attending a three-day tryout with the Cleveland Browns in early May, the team signed Tevaseu to a contract. The Browns waived Tevaseu a month later.

=== New York Jets ===
Tevaseu signed with the New York Jets on July 20, 2010. Tevaseu broke his hand early in training camp. In spite of this, Tevaseu practiced every day with a club on the broken hand. Head coach Rex Ryan praised his tenacity.

Tevaseu was released from the active roster during the Jets' final round of cuts prior to the start of the season. He was promptly re-signed to the team's practice squad.

Tevaseu was promoted to the active roster on January 22, 2011. He was waived on September 4, 2011. He was signed to the practice squad on September 5. He was promoted to the active roster on October 12. He was waived on October 18. He was re-signed to the team's practice squad two days later. He was promoted back to the active roster on October 22. On August 31, 2012, he was waived.

=== Indianapolis Colts ===
Tevaseu was claimed off waivers by the Indianapolis Colts on September 1, 2012. He was released on August 31, 2013 as the Indianapolis Colts got down to the league-mandated 53-player roster to start the season.

== Coaching career ==
Martin now works as a defensive line coach for Santa Rosa Junior College.

== Personal life ==
Tevaseu was born to Debby Fanene. Tevaseu has several other siblings, two brothers and five sisters. Tevaseu is the cousin of former UNLV Rebel and fullback Frank Summers.
