= Robby Felix =

American football player (born 1986)

No. 59, 60, 66
- Position: Center

Personal information
- Born: June 3, 1986 (age 40); Orange, California, U.S.
- Listed height: 6 ft 3 in (1.91 m)
- Listed weight: 300 lb (136 kg)

Career information
- College: Texas-El Paso
- NFL draft: 2009: undrafted

Career history
- Baltimore Ravens (2009)*; Las Vegas Locomotives (2009); New York Jets (2010–2011)*
- * Offseason or practice squad member only

Awards and highlights
- UFL champion (2009)
- Stats at Pro Football Reference

Robby Lawrence Felix (born June 3, 1986) is an American former professional football center. He was signed by the Baltimore Ravens as an undrafted free agent in 2009. He played college football at Texas-El Paso.

Felix has also played for the Las Vegas Locomotives and New York Jets.

== College career ==
Felix was a first-team All-Conference USA honoree in 2008, a third-team choice in 2006 and an honorable mention selection in 2007. He was appointed an honorable mention Freshman All-America by The Sporting News in 2005.

== Professional career ==
=== Baltimore Ravens ===
Felix was signed as an undrafted free agent by the Baltimore Ravens on May 28, 2009. His signing made him the 22nd UTEP player to either be drafted by an NFL team or signed as a free agent since Mike Price took over as head coach for the 2004 season. He was waived by the Ravens on September 5, as part of the Final Roster Cutdowns.

=== New York Jets ===
The New York Jets signed Felix to the roster on May 13, 2010. Felix was waived by the team on September 4, 2010. Felix was later re-signed to the team's practice squad on September 6, 2010.

Felix was signed to a future contract by New York on January 25, 2011. He was waived on September 3, 2011 during the final roster cuts prior to the season.

== Personal life ==
Felix's parents are Larry Felix and Laura Ferro. Felix is married to his college sweetheart, Kelly. They have three daughters.

Felix majored in Business at UTEP.
