= Bo Smith =

American gridiron football player (born 1983)

No. 7, 2
- Position: Cornerback

Personal information
- Born: June 8, 1983 (age 43); Owensboro, Kentucky
- Listed height: 6 ft 0 in (1.83 m)
- Listed weight: 190 lb (86 kg)

Career information
- College: Weber State

Career history
- British Columbia Lions (2007)*; Hamilton Tiger-Cats (2008–2009); New York Jets (2010)*; Hamilton Tiger-Cats (2010–2012); Winnipeg Blue Bombers (2013); Ottawa Redblacks (2014)
- * Offseason or practice squad member only
- Stats at CFL.ca (archive)

Bo Smith (born June 8, 1983) is a former professional Canadian football defensive back. He signed with the BC Lions of the CFL in 2007. Smith played football collegiately at the University of Kentucky before transferring to Weber State during his senior year.

Smith has also been a member of the New York Jets.

== College career ==
Smith was the starting cornerback for three years at the University of Kentucky. Prior to the 2006 season, Smith was dismissed by Kentucky after he was found to be in violation of team rules. Subsequently, Smith finished his collegiate career at Weber State. During his brief tenure at Weber, Smith played well enough to receive an invitation to the 2007 NFL Combine.

A hamstring injury at the combine would sideline Smith who was unable to generate interest from any NFL teams following the injury.

== Professional career ==
=== BC Lions ===
Smith signed with the CFL BC Lions on May 28, 2007.

=== Hamilton Tiger-Cats ===
In 2008, Smith signed with the Hamilton Tiger-Cats.

=== New York Jets ===
On January 8, 2010, Smith was signed to a reserve future contract by the New York Jets following his stand out season with the Hamilton Tiger-Cats in 2009 when he only allowed four touchdown receptions. Smith was waived by the team on September 4, 2010.

=== Hamilton Tiger-Cats (II) ===
On September 21, 2010, Smith rejoined the Tiger-Cats. On May 15, 2013, Smith was released by the Tiger-Cats.

=== Winnipeg Blue Bombers ===
On August 20, 2013, Smith signed with the Winnipeg Blue Bombers.

=== Ottawa Redblacks ===
On February 13, 2014, Smith signed with the Ottawa Redblacks. He was released by the Redblacks on April 16, 2014.
