= John Conner (American football) =

American football player (born 1987)

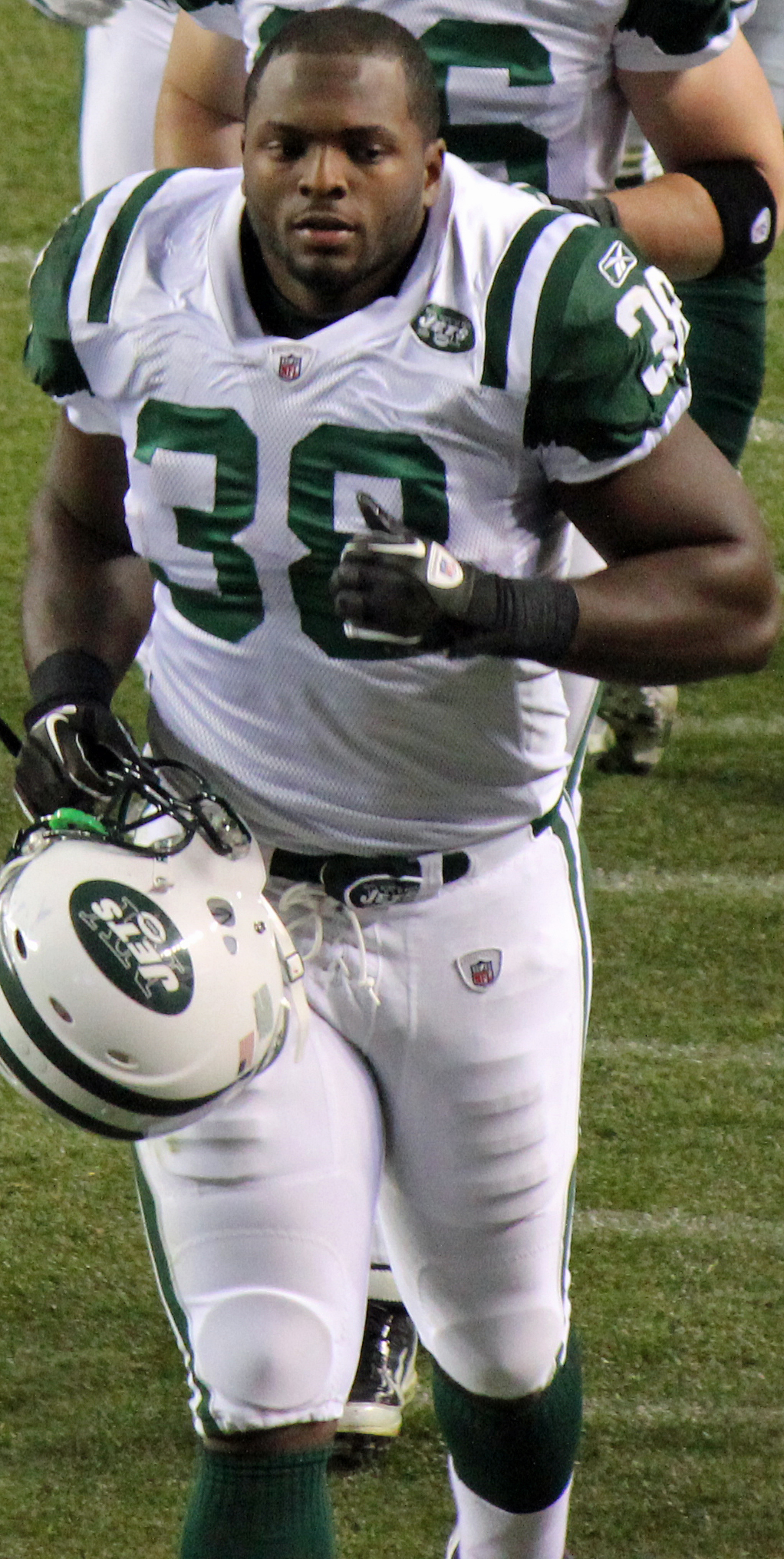
- Conner with the New York Jets in 2011

No. 38, 32, 39
- Position: Fullback

Personal information
- Born: June 8, 1987 (age 39); Cincinnati, Ohio, U.S.
- Listed height: 6 ft 0 in (1.83 m)
- Listed weight: 245 lb (111 kg)

Career information
- High school: Lakota West (West Chester, Ohio)
- College: Kentucky
- NFL draft: 2010: 5th round, 139th overall pick

Career history
- New York Jets (2010–2012); Cincinnati Bengals (2012); New York Giants (2013); New York Jets (2014); Buffalo Bills (2015)*
- * Offseason or practice squad member only

Awards and highlights
- First-team All-American (2009)

Career NFL statistics
- Rushing yards: 108
- Rushing touchdowns: 2
- Receptions: 12
- Receiving yards: 84
- Receiving touchdowns: 1
- Stats at Pro Football Reference

John Edward Conner (born June 8, 1987) is an American former professional football player who was a fullback in the National Football League (NFL). He played college football for the Kentucky Wildcats, earning a 2009 College Football All-America Team selection. One of the best fullback prospects in the 2010 NFL draft, he was selected in the fifth round by the New York Jets. He is nicknamed "the Terminator" because of the name he shares with the main character from the popular movie franchise and because of his aggressive blocking style against defensive players.

== Early life ==
Conner attended Lakota West High School in West Chester, Ohio, where he was a two-year starter at running back. He rushed for 2,100 yards and 36 touchdowns, averaging 11.3 yards per carry, as a senior. That year, Lakota West gained an 8–3 record and a berth in the state playoffs. Conner was subsequently named first-team All-Greater Miami Conference and honorable-mention All-Southwest Ohio.

Unrecognized as a prospect by the two major recruiting services, Rivals.com and Scout.com, Conner was not offered an athletic scholarship, although he received some recruiting attention from Kentucky, Tennessee, West Virginia, and Illinois, among others. He eventually chose to walk on with the Kentucky Wildcats.

== College career ==
As a true freshman at Kentucky, Conner appeared in the first three games of the 2005 season on special teams before sustaining a season-ending injury. He received a medical redshirt and retained the year of eligibility.

In his redshirt freshman season, Conner played in all 13 games, starting the first three at fullback. In his sophomore year he also played all 13 games, starting four. He scored four touchdowns and also made two tackles in kick coverage.

By his junior year, Kentucky frequently opened with a fullback in the lineup, giving him 11 starts in 13 games. In a game versus Georgia, Conner set career highs with seven rushes for 26 yards.

Prior to his senior season, Conner was named the "best blocking back" in the Southeastern Conference in the Birmingham News 2009 preseason edition. After a solid performance throughout the season, Conner earned All-American honors by Pro Football Weekly, which places an extra premium on talent and draft value in the selection process.

== Professional career ==
Pre-draft measurables
Height	Weight	Arm length	Hand span	40-yard dash	10-yard split	20-yard split	20-yard shuttle	Three-cone drill	Vertical jump	Broad jump	Bench press
6 ft 0 in (1.83 m)	246 lb (112 kg)	32 in (0.81 m)	8 1/2 in (0.22 m)	4.64 s	1.56 s	2.60 s	4.32 s	7.15 s	35 in (0.89 m)	9 ft 3 in (2.82 m)	24 reps
All values from NFL Combine

=== New York Jets (first stint) ===
He does all the things that NFL teams ask their fullbacks to do. He blocks. He catches the ball. And when you need him to make a carry in short yardage, he almost always picks up first downs. He's going to have a long career in the league.

— UK offensive head coach Joker Phillips

Considered one of the best fullbacks available in the 2010 NFL draft, Conner was selected in the fifth round (139th overall) by the New York Jets. In 2012, Conner struggled with an MCL sprain and hamstring injury, and was released by the Jets on October 17.

=== Cincinnati Bengals ===
Conner was signed by the Cincinnati Bengals on December 15, 2012, after the team placed fullback Chris Pressley on the injured reserve list. Conner was released by the Bengals on August 31, 2013. In an episode of Hard Knocks, Bengals coaches stated that though Conner was the best Fullback on the roster, they were keeping Orson Charles due to his special teams play, even going as far as showing Charles game film of Conner after the decision.

=== New York Giants ===
After working out with the Buffalo Bills, Conner was signed to a two-year contract by the New York Giants on September 25, 2013, replacing Henry Hynoski, who suffered a fractured shoulder in Week 3 of the regular season.

=== New York Jets (second stint) ===
Conner was re-signed by the New York Jets on September 30, 2014 after fullback Tommy Bohanon suffered a broken collarbone.

=== Buffalo Bills ===
Conner signed with the Buffalo Bills on May 13, 2015, reuniting with his former head coach Rex Ryan. On September 4, 2015, he was released by the Bills.
