= Mike Turkovich =

American football player (born 1986)

No. 77
- Position: Offensive tackle

Personal information
- Born: November 27, 1986 (age 39); Bedford, Pennsylvania, U.S.
- Listed height: 6 ft 6 in (1.98 m)
- Listed weight: 305 lb (138 kg)

Career information
- College: Notre Dame
- NFL draft: 2009: undrafted

Career history
- Dallas Cowboys (2009)*; New York Jets (2010)*; Chicago Rush (2011); Pittsburgh Power (2011)
- * Offseason or practice squad member only

Michael Turkovich (born November 27, 1986) is an American former football offensive tackle. He was signed by the Dallas Cowboys as an undrafted free agent in 2009. He played college football at Notre Dame.

== Professional career ==
=== Dallas Cowboys ===
After going undrafted in the 2009 NFL draft, Turkovich was signed by the Dallas Cowboys as an undrafted free agent. He was waived/injured after suffering a knee injury during training camp on August 3 and subsequently reverted to injured reserve. He was released with an injury settlement on August 7.

=== New York Jets ===
Turkovich signed a future contract with the New York Jets on February 23, 2010. Turkovich would be waived by the New York on September 4, 2010.

=== Chicago Rush ===
Turkovich signed with the Chicago Rush of the Arena Football League for the 2011 season. He was one of the team's starting offensive linemen. He was released on June 20, 2011.

=== Pittsburgh Power ===
Turkovich signed with the Power on June 21, 2011. However, Turkovich spent the rest of the season on the Refuse to Report list.
