= 2011 New York Jets season =

2011 season of NFL team New York Jets

- Owner: Woody & Christopher Johnson
- General manager: Mike Tannenbaum
- Head coach: Rex Ryan
- Home stadium: MetLife Stadium

Results
- Record: 8–8
- Division place: 2nd AFC East
- Playoffs: Did not qualify
- Pro Bowlers: OT D'Brickashaw Ferguson; C Nick Mangold; CB Darrelle Revis; OG Brandon Moore

Uniform
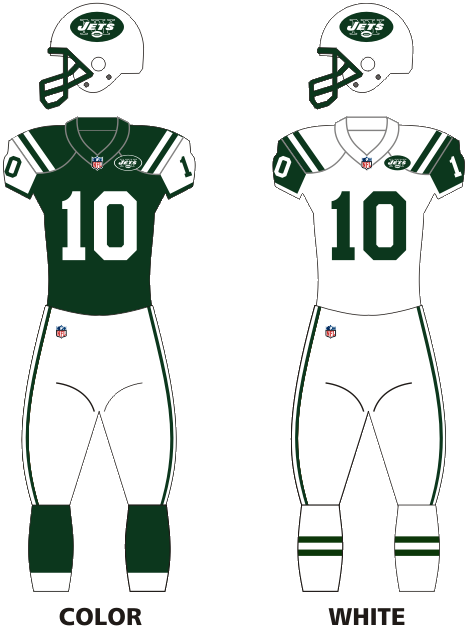

The 2011 season was the New York Jets' 42nd in the National Football League (NFL), their 52nd overall and their third under head coach Rex Ryan.

Despite sitting at 8–5 in early December, controlling their own destiny to make the postseason, the Jets lost their last three games and finished at 8–8. The team failed to improve upon their 11–5 record from 2010 and failed to reach the playoffs and the AFC Championship game for the first time since 2008, which also had a three-game losing streak to close the season. The Jets' 2011 season, from its lockout-impacted start to the team's losing streak that marked its end was chronicled extensively in Nicholas Dawidoff's 2013 book Collision Low Crossers: A Year Inside the Turbulent World of NFL Football. Beginning in the offseason, Dawidoff embedded himself with the team, primarily with defensive coordinator Mike Pettine and assistants Dennis Thurman and Mike Smith. This season began a lengthy postseason drought for the Jets; as of 2025, they have failed to qualify for the playoffs since 2011, with just one winning season in that time.

== Transactions ==
=== Coaching changes ===
- Strength and conditioning coach Sal Alosi tendered his resignation from the team on January 31, 2011. In November 2010, Alosi became embroiled in controversy when he tripped Miami Dolphins' cornerback Nolan Carroll on a punt return that resulted in his suspension from the team. Former Atlanta Falcons' assistant Bill Hughan was hired as the team's new strength and conditioning coach two weeks later on February 14, 2011.
- Mike Bloomgren left his assistant offensive coordinator position with the team in February to become the offensive line coach and run coordinator at Stanford.
- Former Indianapolis Colts offensive coordinator Tom Moore was hired as an offensive consultant for the team in July 2011.

=== Arrivals ===
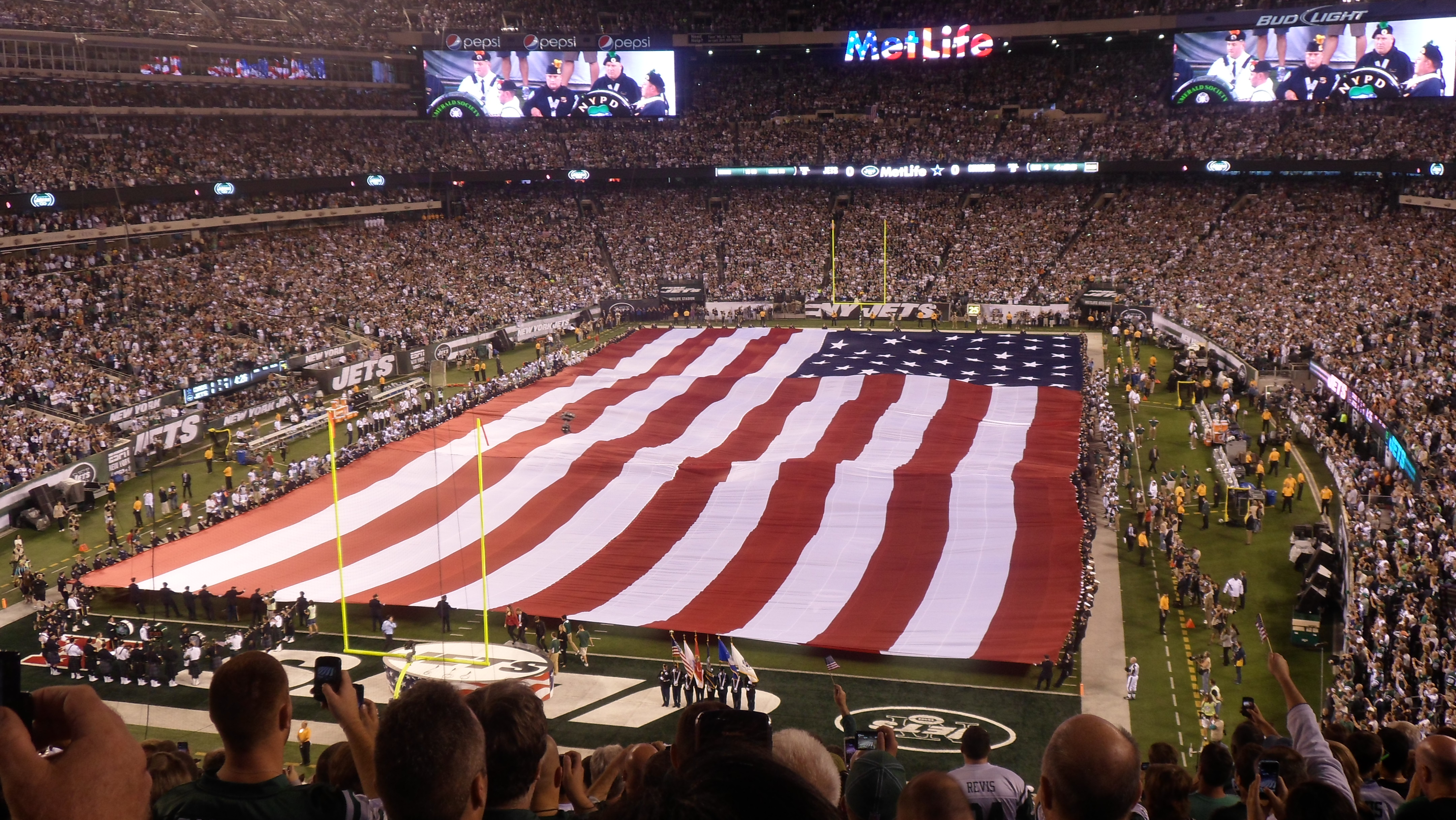
September 11 tribute before the Jets' first game, against Dallas at MetLife Stadium

- The Jets signed Nick Novak on February 9, 2011, to compete with incumbent kicker Nick Folk.
- The Jets announced the addition of ten undrafted free agents on July 27, 2011; Josh Baker, Collin Franklin, Nick Bellore, Stafford Gatling, Michael Campbell, Dan DePalma, Courtney Smith, Tom Ottaiano, Chris Stewart, and Julian Posey.
- The Jets announced the addition of six undrafted free agents on July 28, 2011; Byron Landor, Davon Morgan, Zane Taylor, Taylor Boggs, Jeff Wills, and Matthias Berning.
- The Jets signed Chris Bryan and undrafted free agents Jeremy McGee and Jake Duron on July 29, 2011.
- The Jets signed Donald Strickland on July 30, 2011.
- The Jets signed Plaxico Burress on July 31, 2011.
- The Jets signed DaJuan Morgan on August 2, 2011.
- The Jets signed Trevor Canfield and Pete Clifford on August 4, 2011.
- The Jets signed Derrick Mason on August 6, 2011.
- The Jets signed Wilson Raynor and Keith Zinger on August 7, 2011.
- The Jets signed David Herron and Eddie Jones on August 9, 2011.
- The Jets signed Cordarol Scales on August 10, 2011.
- The Jets signed Aaron Maybin on August 17, 2011.
- The Jets signed Tracy Wilson and Nevin McCaskill on August 24, 2011.
- The Jets signed Isaiah Trufant on September 1, 2011.
- The Jets claimed Andrew Sendejo, Mardy Gilyard, Kevin O'Connell, and Colin Baxter off waivers on September 4, 2011.
- The Jets promoted Isaiah Trufant from the practice squad on September 10, 2011.
- The Jets promoted Patrick Turner from the practice squad on September 13, 2011.
- The Jets promoted Josh Baker from the practice squad on September 27, 2011.
- The Jets re-signed Aaron Maybin on September 28, 2011.
- The Jets promoted Eddie Jones from the practice squad on October 8, 2011.
- The Jets re-signed Ellis Lankster on October 11, 2011. Additionally, Martin Tevaseu was promoted from the practice squad.
- The Jets signed Eron Riley off the Broncos' practice squad on October 19, 2011.
- Shawn Nelson was signed to the Jets from Free Agency on October 31, 2011.
- The Jets signed Austin Howard from the Ravens' practice squad on November 25, 2011.
- The Jets promoted Tracy Wilson from the practice squad on November 28, 2011.
- The Jets signed Gerald Alexander following a season-ending knee injury to Jim Leonhard on December 13, 2011.
- The Jets promoted Ricky Sapp from the practice squad on December 29, 2011.

=== Departures ===
- The Jets released veterans Damien Woody, Kris Jenkins and Jason Taylor on February 28, 2011.
- The Jets released Vernon Gholston and Ben Hartsock on March 2, 2011.
- The Jets released Mark Brunell, Kevin O'Connell, Will Billingsley and Marlon Davis on July 29, 2011. Additionally, the Jets officially released retired quarterback Erik Ainge.
- The Jets released Carlos Brown on August 2, 2011.
- The Jets released Jerricho Cotchery on August 4, 2011. Additionally, Tom Ottaiano, Jeff Wills and Jeremy McGee were waived.
- The Jets released Cody Brown and waived Collin Franklin on August 7, 2011.
- The Jets waived DaJuan Morgan, Satfford Gatling and Carlton Powell.
- The Jets waived Taylor Boggs and David Herron on August 12, 2011.
- The Jets waived Cordarol Scales and Richard Taylor on August 17, 2011.
- The Jets waived Wilson Raynor, Brian Toal and Jake Duron on August 23, 2011.
- The Jets waived Brandon Long and Chris Stewart on August 24, 2011.
- The Jets waived Chris Bryan, Nick Novak and Courtney Smith on August 30, 2011.
- To meet the mandatory 53 man roster requirement, the Jets waived Josh Baker, Matthias Berning, Michael Campbell, Trevor Canfield, Pete Clifford, Dan DePalma, Robby Felix, Jarron Gilbert, Chris Jennings, Eddie Jones, Matt Kroul, Dennis Landolt, Byron Landor, Ellis Lankster, Joey LaRocque, Nevin McCaskill, Scotty McKnight, Davon Morgan, Julian Posey, Brashton Satele, Zane Taylor, Patrick Turner, Lorenzo Washington, Drew Willy, Tracy Wilson and Keith Zinger.
- The Jets waived Aaron Maybin, Isaiah Trufant and Martin Tevaseu on September 4, 2011.
- The Jets cut Mardy Gilyard on September 9, 2011.
- The Jets waived Andrew Sendejo on September 13, 2011.
- The Jets released Eddie Jones on October 11, 2011.
- The Jets waived Martin Tevaseu on October 18, 2011.
- The Jets waived Colin Baxter on October 25, 2011.
- The Jets waived Shawn Nelson on November 22, 2011.
- The Jets waived Emanuel Cook on November 28, 2011.
- The Jets waived Eron Riley on December 28, 2011.

=== Practice squad ===
==== Additions ====
- The Jets signed Josh Baker, Matthias Berning, Trevor Canfield, Jarron Gilbert, Matt Kroul, Julian Posey and Patrick Turner to the practice squad on September 4, 2011.
- The Jets signed Martin Tevaseu and Isaiah Trufant on September 5, 2011.
- The Jets signed Josh Baker and Andrew Sendejo on September 14, 2011.
- The Jets signed Matthias Berning and Scotty McKnight on September 21, 2011.
- The Jets signed Martell Webb, Michael Campbell and Julian Posey on September 27, 2011.
- The Jets signed Eddie Jones on September 28, 2011.
- The Jets signed Dennis Landolt on October 4, 2011.
- The Jets signed Michael Campbell and Tracy Wilson on October 12, 2011.
- The Jets re-signed Martin Tevaseu on October 20, 2011.
- The Jets signed Ricky Sapp and Jamarko Simmons and re-signed Matt Kroul and Dennis Landolt on October 31, 2011.
- The Jets re-signed Michael Campbell on November 1, 2011.
- The Jets signed Dexter Jackson on November 9, 2011.
- The Jets re-signed Jarron Gilbert on November 19, 2011.
- The Jets re-signed Eddie Jones on November 21, 2011.
- The Jets re-signed Ricky Sapp on November 28, 2011.
- The Jets re-signed Dexter Jackson on November 30, 2011.
- The Jets signed Mark LeGree on December 13, 2011.
- The Jets signed Eron Riley on December 29, 2011.

==== Departures ====
- The Jets released Josh Baker on September 5, 2011.
- The Jets promoted Isaiah Trufant to the active roster on September 10, 2011.
- The Jets released Matthias Berning on September 13, 2011.
- The Jets promoted Patrick Turner to the active roster on September 14, 2011.
- The Jets released Trevor Canfield and Julian Posey on September 19, 2011.
- Andrew Sendejo and Matthias Berning were released on September 27, 2011. Additionally, Josh Baker was promoted to the active roster.
- The Jets released Martell Webb and Michael Campbell on October 4, 2011.
- The Jets promoted Eddie Jones to the active roster on October 8, 2011.
- The Jets promoted Martin Tevaseu to the active roster on October 12, 2011.
- The Jets released Dennis Landolt on October 18, 2011.
- The Jets promoted Martin Tevaseu to the active roster on October 22, 2011.
- The Jets released Michael Campbell on October 24, 2011.
- The Jets released Matt Kroul on October 25, 2011.
- The Jets released Eddie Jones on October 31, 2011.
- The Jets released Jarron Gilbert on November 9, 2011.
- The Jets released Dexter Jackson on November 19, 2011.
- The Jets released Ricky Sapp on November 21, 2011.
- The Jets released Eddie Jones and promoted Tracy Wilson to the active roster on November 28, 2011.
- The Jets promoted Ricky Sapp to the active roster on December 29, 2011.

=== Trades ===
==== To Jets ====
The Jets traded an unconditional draft pick to the Green Bay Packers for Caleb Schlauderaff.

==== From Jets ====
- Dwight Lowery was traded to the Jacksonville Jaguars for an unconditional draft pick.
- Derrick Mason was traded to the Houston Texans for an unconditional draft pick on October 11, 2011.

=== Free Agents ===
| Position | Player | Free agency tag | Date signed/released | 2011 team | Notes |
|---|---|---|---|---|---|
| QB | Kellen Clemens | UFA | July 27, 2011 | Washington Redskins | |
| CB | Marquice Cole | ERFA | January 26, 2011 | New York Jets | |
| CB | Drew Coleman | UFA | July 29, 2011 | Jacksonville Jaguars | |
| CB | Antonio Cromartie | UFA | August 1, 2011 | New York Jets | |
| DL | Marcus Dixon | ERFA | January 26, 2011 | New York Jets | |
| WR | Braylon Edwards | UFA | August 4, 2011 | San Francisco 49ers | |
| DL | Shaun Ellis | UFA | August 7, 2011 | New England Patriots | |
| K | Nick Folk | UFA | July 27, 2011 | New York Jets | |
| LB | David Harris | UFA | August 2, 2011 | New York Jets | |
| WR | Santonio Holmes | UFA | July 27, 2011 | New York Jets | |
| OL | Wayne Hunter | UFA | July 26, 2011 | New York Jets | |
| S | James Ihedigbo | UFA | August 19, 2011 | New England Patriots | |
| LB | Lance Laury | UFA | – | – | – |
| S | Brodney Pool | UFA | August 3, 2011 | New York Jets | |
| DL | Trevor Pryce | UFA | – | – | – |
| FB | Tony Richardson | UFA | – | – | – |
| WR | Brad Smith | UFA | July 28, 2011 | Buffalo Bills | |
| S | Eric Smith | UFA | July 30, 2011 | New York Jets | |
| OL | Robert Turner | RFA | July 29, 2011 | New York Jets | |
| P | Steve Weatherford | UFA | July 29, 2011 | New York Giants | |
RFA: Restricted free agent, UFA: Unrestricted free agent, ERFA: Exclusive rights free agent, FT: Franchise tag

=== 2011 NFL draft ===
| Draft order | | Player name | Position | Height | Weight | College | Notes |
| RD | PK | Player name | Position | Height | Weight | College | Notes |
|---|---|---|---|---|---|---|---|
| 1 | 30 (30) | Muhammad Wilkerson | DL | 6 ft 5 in | 305 lbs | Temple | |
| 2 | 29 (61) | Traded to San Diego Chargers for CB Antonio Cromartie. | | | | | |
| 3 | 30 (94) | Kenrick Ellis | DT | 6 ft 5 in | 346 lbs | Hampton | |
| 4 | 29 (126) | Bilal Powell | RB | 5 ft 11 in | 207 lbs | Louisville | |
| 5 | 22 (153) | Jeremy Kerley | WR | 5 ft 10 in | 189 lbs | TCU | From Philadelphia Eagles for Draft Picks Rounds 5 and 6 Picks 161 and 194 |
| 5 | 30 (161) | Traded to Philadelphia Eagles along with Draft Pick Round 6 Pick 194 for Draft Pick Round 5 Pick 153 and Round 7 Pick 227. | | | | | |
| 6 | 29 (194) | Traded to Philadelphia Eagles along with Draft Pick Round 5 Pick 161 for Draft Pick Round 5 Pick 153 and Round 7 Pick 227. | | | | | |
| 7 | 5 (208) | Greg McElroy | QB | 6 ft 2 in | 222 lb | Alabama | From Arizona Cardinals for FS Kerry Rhodes. |
| 7 | 24 (227) | Scotty McKnight | WR | 5 ft 11 in | 182 lb | Colorado | From Seattle Seahawks through Philadelphia Eagles |
| 7 | 30 (231) | Traded to Detroit Lions for QB Kevin O'Connell. | | | | | |

== Staff ==
New York Jets 2011 staff
| Front office: Chairman/CEO – Woody Johnson; Executive vice president/general manager – Mike Tannenbaum; Assistant general manager – Scott Cohen; Vice president of college scouting – Joey Clinkscales; Senior personnel executive – Terry Bradway; Assistant director of player personnel – JoJo Wooden; Director of pro personnel – Brendan Phophett; Assistant director of college scouting – Michael Davis; Head coaches: Head coach – Rex Ryan; Assistant head coach/offensive line – Bill Callahan; Offensive coaches: Offensive coordinator – Brian Schottenheimer; Quarterbacks – Matt Cavanaugh; Running backs – Anthony Lynn; Wide receivers – Henry Ellard; Assistant offensive line/tight ends – Mike Devlin; Offensive quality control – Lance Taylor; Coaching intern – Samson Brown; Coaches’ Assistant – Andy Dickerson; Consultant – Dan Shamash | Defensive coaches: Defensive coordinator – Mike Pettine; Defensive line – Mark Carrier; Assistant defensive line – Jeff Weeks; Linebackers – Bob Sutton; Secondary – Dennis Thurman; Assistant defensive backs – Jim O'Neil; Defensive quality control – Brian Smith; Coaching intern/outside linebackers – Mike Smith; Special teams coaches: Special teams coordinator – Mike Westhoff; Assistant special teams – Ben Kotwica; Strength and conditioning: Head strength and conditioning – Bill Hughan; Assistant strength and conditioning – Bryan Dermody |

== Final roster ==
2011 New York Jets roster
| Quarterbacks (QB): 8 Mark Brunell; 7 Kevin O'Connell; 6 Mark Sanchez; Running backs (RB): 38 John Conner FB; 23 Shonn Greene; 25 Joe McKnight; 29 Bilal Powell; 21 LaDainian Tomlinson; Wide receivers (WR): 17 Plaxico Burress; 10 Santonio Holmes; 11 Jeremy Kerley PR; 88 Patrick Turner; Tight ends (TE): 45 Josh Baker; 81 Dustin Keller; 82 Matthew Mulligan | Offensive linemen (OL): 62 Vladimir Ducasse T; 60 D'Brickashaw Ferguson T; 77 Austin Howard T; 78 Wayne Hunter T; 74 Nick Mangold C; 65 Brandon Moore G; 72 Caleb Schlauderaff G; 68 Matt Slauson G; Defensive linemen (DL): 70 Mike DeVito DE; 94 Marcus Dixon DE; 93 Kenrick Ellis NT; 79 Ropati Pitoitua DE; 91 Sione Po'uha NT; 95 Martin Tevaseu NT; 96 Muhammad Wilkerson DE | Linebackers (LB): 54 Nick Bellore ILB; 52 David Harris ILB; 50 Garrett McIntyre OLB; 53 Josh Mauga ILB; 51 Aaron Maybin OLB; 97 Calvin Pace OLB; 92 Ricky Sapp OLB; 57 Bart Scott ILB; 55 Jamaal Westerman OLB; Defensive backs (DB): 42 Gerald Alexander SS; 34 Marquice Cole CB; 31 Antonio Cromartie CB; 26 Ellis Lankster CB; 22 Brodney Pool S; 24 Darrelle Revis CB; 33 Eric Smith FS; 30 Donald Strickland CB; 35 Isaiah Trufant CB; 20 Kyle Wilson CB; 37 Tracy Wilson SS; Special teams (ST): 4 T. J. Conley P; 2 Nick Folk K; 46 Tanner Purdum LS | Practice squad: 84 Michael Campbell WR; 83 Dedrick Epps TE; 89 Dexter Jackson WR; 66 Matt Kroul G; 76 Dennis Landolt G; 43 Mark LeGree S; 15 Scotty McKnight WR (IR); 32 Julian Posey CB; 19 Eron Riley WR; 85 Jamarko Simmons WR (IR); Reserve: 64 Taylor Boggs G (IR); 86 Jeff Cumberland TE (IR); 36 Jim Leonhard SS (IR); 14 Greg McElroy QB (IR); 18 Logan Payne WR (IR); 58 Bryan Thomas OLB (IR); 75 Rob Turner C/G (IR); Rookies in italics 53 active, 9 reserve, 8 practice squad |

== Preseason ==
| Week | Date | Opponent | Result | Record | Venue | Recap |
|---|---|---|---|---|---|---|
| 1 | August 15 | at Houston Texans | L 16–20 | 0–1 | Reliant Stadium | Recap |
| 2 | August 21 | Cincinnati Bengals | W 27–7 | 1–1 | MetLife Stadium | Recap |
| 3 | August 29 | at New York Giants | W 17–3 | 2–1 | MetLife Stadium | Recap |
| 4 | September 1 | Philadelphia Eagles | L 14–24 | 2–2 | MetLife Stadium | Recap |

== Regular season ==
=== Schedule ===
| Week | Date | Opponent | Result | Record | Venue | Recap |
|---|---|---|---|---|---|---|
| 1 | September 11 | Dallas Cowboys | **W** 27–24 | 1–0 | MetLife Stadium | Recap |
| 2 | September 18 | Jacksonville Jaguars | **W** 32–3 | 2–0 | MetLife Stadium | Recap |
| 3 | September 25 | at Oakland Raiders | **L** 24–34 | 2–1 | O.co Coliseum | Recap |
| 4 | October 2 | at Baltimore Ravens | **L** 17–34 | 2–2 | M&T Bank Stadium | Recap |
| 5 | October 9 | at **New England Patriots** | **L** 21–30 | 2–3 | Gillette Stadium | Recap |
| 6 | October 17 | **Miami Dolphins** | **W** 24–6 | 3–3 | MetLife Stadium | Recap |
| 7 | October 23 | San Diego Chargers | **W** 27–21 | 4–3 | MetLife Stadium | Recap |
| 8 | Bye | | | | | |
| 9 | November 6 | at **Buffalo Bills** | **W** 27–11 | 5–3 | Ralph Wilson Stadium | Recap |
| 10 | November 13 | **New England Patriots** | **L** 16–37 | 5–4 | MetLife Stadium | Recap |
| 11 | November 17 | at Denver Broncos | **L** 13–17 | 5–5 | Sports Authority Field at Mile High | Recap |
| 12 | November 27 | **Buffalo Bills** | **W** 28–24 | 6–5 | MetLife Stadium | Recap |
| 13 | December 4 | at Washington Redskins | **W** 34–19 | 7–5 | FedExField | Recap |
| 14 | December 11 | Kansas City Chiefs | **W** 37–10 | 8–5 | MetLife Stadium | Recap |
| 15 | December 18 | at Philadelphia Eagles | **L** 19–45 | 8–6 | Lincoln Financial Field | Recap |
| 16 | December 24 | New York Giants | **L** 14–29 | 8–7 | MetLife Stadium | Recap |
| 17 | January 1 | at **Miami Dolphins** | **L** 17–19 | 8–8 | Sun Life Stadium | Recap |

Note: Intra-division opponents are in bold text.

# Colored throwback Titans jerseys

=== Standings ===
==== Division ====
AFC East
| | W | L | T | PCT | DIV | CONF | PF | PA | STK |
|---|---|---|---|---|---|---|---|---|---|
| ^{(1)} New England Patriots | 13 | 3 | 0 | .813 | 5–1 | 10–2 | 513 | 342 | W8 |
| New York Jets | 8 | 8 | 0 | .500 | 3–3 | 6–6 | 377 | 363 | L3 |
| Miami Dolphins | 6 | 10 | 0 | .375 | 3–3 | 5–7 | 329 | 313 | W1 |
| Buffalo Bills | 6 | 10 | 0 | .375 | 1–5 | 4–8 | 372 | 434 | L1 |

==== Conference ====
AFC
| # | Team | Division | W | L | T | PCT | DIV | CONF | SOS | SOV | STK |
|---|---|---|---|---|---|---|---|---|---|---|---|
**Division winners**
| 1 | New England Patriots | East | 13 | 3 | 0 | .813 | 5–1 | 10–2 | .449 | .423 | W8 |
| 2 (Note: Baltimore clinched the AFC North title based on a head-to-head sweep over Pittsburgh.) | Baltimore Ravens | North | 12 | 4 | 0 | .750 | 6–0 | 9–3 | .477 | .484 | W2 |
| 3 | Houston Texans | South | 10 | 6 | 0 | .625 | 4–2 | 8–4 | .453 | .413 | L3 |
| 4 (Note: Denver clinched the AFC West title instead of San Diego or Oakland based on common record (5–5 to San Diego's and Oakland's 4–6).) | Denver Broncos | West | 8 | 8 | 0 | .500 | 3–3 | 6–6 | .520 | .445 | L3 |
**Wild cards**
| 5 | Pittsburgh Steelers | North | 12 | 4 | 0 | .750 | 4–2 | 9–3 | .492 | .411 | W2 |
| 6 (Note: Cincinnati clinched the AFC 6 seed instead of Tennessee based on a head-to-head victory.) | Cincinnati Bengals | North | 9 | 7 | 0 | .563 | 2–4 | 6–6 | .492 | .326 | L1 |
**Did not qualify for the postseason**
| 7 | Tennessee Titans | South | 9 | 7 | 0 | .563 | 3–3 | 7–5 | .461 | .396 | W2 |
| 8 (Note: New York Jets finished ahead of San Diego based on head-to-head victory.) | New York Jets | East | 8 | 8 | 0 | .500 | 3–3 | 6–6 | .500 | .395 | L3 |
| 9 (Note: San Diego finished ahead of Oakland in the AFC West based on conference record (7–5 to 6–6).) | San Diego Chargers | West | 8 | 8 | 0 | .500 | 3–3 | 7–5 | .516 | .430 | W1 |
| 10 | Oakland Raiders | West | 8 | 8 | 0 | .500 | 3–3 | 6–6 | .504 | .438 | L1 |
| 11 | Kansas City Chiefs | West | 7 | 9 | 0 | .438 | 3–3 | 4–8 | .512 | .464 | W1 |
| 12 (Note: Miami finished ahead of Buffalo based on head-to-head sweep.) | Miami Dolphins | East | 6 | 10 | 0 | .375 | 3–3 | 5–7 | .504 | .417 | W1 |
| 13 | Buffalo Bills | East | 6 | 10 | 0 | .375 | 1–5 | 4–8 | .520 | .510 | L1 |
| 14 | Jacksonville Jaguars | South | 5 | 11 | 0 | .313 | 3–3 | 4–8 | .500 | .363 | W1 |
| 15 | Cleveland Browns | North | 4 | 12 | 0 | .250 | 0–6 | 3–9 | .531 | .313 | L6 |
| 16 | Indianapolis Colts | South | 2 | 14 | 0 | .125 | 2–4 | 2–10 | .539 | .594 | L1 |
**Tiebreakers** (Note: When breaking ties for three or more teams under the NFL's rules, they are first broken within divisions, then comparing only the highest ranked remaining team from each division.)

== Regular season results ==
=== Week 1: vs. Dallas Cowboys ===
Week One: Dallas Cowboys at New York Jets – Game summary

| Quarter | 1 | 2 | 3 | 4 | Total |
|---|---|---|---|---|---|
| Cowboys | 7 | 3 | 7 | 7 | 24 |
| Jets | 0 | 7 | 3 | 17 | 27 |

at MetLife Stadium, East Rutherford, New Jersey

- Date: September 11
- Game time: 8:20 p.m. EDT
- Game weather: 70 °F (21 °C), cloudy
- Game attendance: 78,702
- Referee: Alberto Riveron
- TV announcers (NBC): Al Michaels, Cris Collinsworth and Michele Tafoya
- Recap, Gamebook

Game information

First quarter

- Dez Bryant 3-yard pass from Tony Romo (Dan Bailey Kick) Cowboys 7–0, Drive: 9 plays, 74 yards, 4:33.

Second quarter

- Dan Bailey 34-yard field goal Cowboys 10–0, Drive: 10 plays, 47 yards, 4:47.
- Dustin Keller 4-yard pass from Mark Sanchez (Nick Folk Kick) Cowboys 10–7, Drive: 9 plays, 87 yards, 2:39.

Third quarter

- Miles Austin 36-yard pass from Tony Romo (Dan Bailey Kick) Cowboys 17–7, Drive: 8 plays, 73 yards, 4:40.
- Nick Folk 34 Yd field goal Cowboys 17–10, Drive: 10 plays, 64 yards, 4:04.

Fourth quarter

- Felix Jones 1-yard run (Dan Bailey Kick) Cowboys 24–10, Drive: 2 plays, 1 yards, 0:10.
- Plaxico Burress 26-yard pass from Mark Sanchez (Nick Folk Kick) Cowboys 24–17, Drive: 7 plays, 84 yards, 2:54.
- Isaiah Trufant 18 yard return off blocked punt (Nick Folk Kick) TIE 24–24
- Nick Folk 50-yard field goal Cowboys 27–24, Drive: 4 plays, 2 yards, 0:22.

Top passers

- DAL – Tony Romo – 23/36, 342 yards, 2TD, 1INT
- NYJ – Mark Sanchez – 26/44, 335 yards, 2TD, 1INT

Top rushers

- DAL – Felix Jones – 17 rushes, 44 yards
- NYJ – Shonn Greene – 10 rushes, 26 yards

Top receivers

- DAL – Jason Witten – 6 receptions, 110 yards
- NYJ – LaDainian Tomlinson – 6 receptions, 73 yards

Top tacklers

- DAL – DeMarcus Ware – 4 tackles, 2.0 sacks
- NYJ – Bart Scott – 8 tackles, 1.0 sack

=== Week 2: vs. Jacksonville Jaguars ===
Week Two: Jacksonville Jaguars at New York Jets – Game summary

| Quarter | 1 | 2 | 3 | 4 | Total |
|---|---|---|---|---|---|
| Jaguars | 3 | 0 | 0 | 0 | 3 |
| Jets | 9 | 6 | 14 | 3 | 32 |

at MetLife Stadium, East Rutherford, New Jersey

- Date: September 18
- Game time: 1:00 p.m. EDT
- Game weather: 66 °F (19 °C), clear
- Game attendance: 78,834
- Referee: Scott Green
- TV announcers (CBS): Greg Gumbel and Dan Dierdorf
- Recap, Gamebook

Game information

First quarter

- NYJ Santonio Holmes 17-yard pass from Mark Sanchez (Nick Folk kick) Jets 7–0, Drive: 6 plays, 65 yards, 3:23.
- NYJ Luke McCown sacked in endzone by Muhammad Wilkerson Jets 9–0
- JAC Josh Scobee 55-yard field goal Jets 9–3, Drive: 6 plays, 20 yards, 2:52.

Second quarter

- NYJ Nick Folk 38-yard field goal Jets 12–3, Drive: 8 plays, 39 yards, 4:34.
- NYJ Nick Folk 45-yard field goal Jets 15–3, Drive: 4 plays, 1 yards, 0:54.

Third quarter

- NYJ Dustin Keller 11-yard pass from Mark Sanchez (Nick Folk kick) Jets 22–3, Drive: 8 plays, 92 yards, 5:18.
- NYJ Shonn Greene 1-yard run (Nick Folk kick) Jets 29–3, Drive: 2 plays, 1 yards, 0:38.

Fourth quarter

- NYJ Nick Folk 23-yard field goal Jets 32–3, Drive: 6 plays, 13 yards, 2:14.

Top passers

- JAC – Luke McCown – 6/19, 59 yards, 4INT
- NYJ – Mark Sanchez – 17/24, 182 yards, 2TD, 2INT

Top rushers

- JAC – Maurice Jones-Drew – 18 rushes, 88 yards
- NYJ – Shonn Greene – 16 rushes, 49 yards, 1TD

Top receivers

- JAC – Mike Thomas – 3 receptions, 29 yards
- NYJ – Dustin Keller – 6 receptions, 101 yards, 1TD

Top tacklers

- JAC – Rashean Mathis – 7 tackles, 1INT
- NYJ – Mike DeVito – 5 tackles

=== Week 3: at Oakland Raiders ===
Week Three: New York Jets at Oakland Raiders – Game summary

| Quarter | 1 | 2 | 3 | 4 | Total |
|---|---|---|---|---|---|
| Jets | 7 | 10 | 0 | 7 | 24 |
| Raiders | 7 | 10 | 7 | 10 | 34 |

at O.co Coliseum, Oakland, California

- Date: September 25
- Game time: 4:05 p.m. EDT/1:05 p.m. PDT
- Game weather: 70 °F (21 °C), sunny
- Game attendance: 61,546
- Referee: Gene Steratore
- TV announcers (CBS): Jim Nantz and Phil Simms
- Recap, Gamebook

Game information

First quarter

- Darren McFadden 2-yard run (Sebastian Janikowski Kick) Raiders 7–0, Drive: 5 plays, 76 yards, 2:24.
- Mark Sanchez 1-yard run (Nick Folk Kick) TIE 7–7, Drive: 4 plays, 71 yards, 1:53.

Second quarter

- LaDainian Tomlinson 18-yard pass from Mark Sanchez (Nick Folk Kick) Jets 14–7, Drive: 8 plays, 79 yards, 4:11.
- Nick Folk 21-yard field goal Jets 17–7, Drive: 10 plays, 51 yards, 4:58.
- Darren McFadden 70-yard run (Sebastian Janikowski Kick) Jets 17–14, Drive: 3 plays, 85 yards, 1:23.
- Sebastian Janikowski 54-yard field goal TIE 17–17, Drive: 10 plays, 51 yards, 1:44.

Third quarter

- Denarius Moore 23-yard run (Sebastian Janikowski Kick) Raiders 24–17, Drive: 4 plays, 63 yards, 1:47.

Fourth quarter

- Michael Bush 1-yard run (Sebastian Janikowski Kick) Raiders 31–17, Drive: 2 plays, 13 yards, 0:42.
- Plaxico Burress 16-yard pass from Mark Sanchez (Nick Folk Kick) Raiders 31–24, Drive: 10 plays, 93 yards, 3:06.
- Sebastian Janikowski 49-yard field goal Raiders 34–24, Drive: 8 plays, 49 yards, 2:56.

Top passers

- NYJ – Mark Sanchez- 27 for 43, 369 yards, 2TD, 1INT
- OAK – Jason Campbell- 18 for 27, 156 yards

Top rushers

- NYJ – Shonn Greene- 15 rushes, 59 yards
- OAK – Darren McFadden- 19 rushes, 171 yards, 2TD

Top receivers

- NYJ – LaDainian Tomlinson- 5 receptions, 116 yards, 1TD
- OAK – Kevin Boss- 2 receptions, 36 yards

Top tacklers

- NYJ – Antonio Cromartie- 9 tackles
- OAK – Rolando McClain- 12 tackles

=== Week 4: at Baltimore Ravens ===
Week Four: New York Jets at Baltimore Ravens – Game summary

| Quarter | 1 | 2 | 3 | 4 | Total |
|---|---|---|---|---|---|
| Jets | 7 | 10 | 0 | 0 | 17 |
| Ravens | 17 | 10 | 7 | 0 | 34 |

at M&T Bank Stadium, Baltimore, Maryland

- Date: October 2
- Game time: 8:20 p.m. EDT
- Game weather: 51 °F (11 °C), cloudy
- Game attendance: 71,247
- Referee: Mike Carey
- TV announcers (NBC): Al Michaels, Cris Collinsworth and Michele Tafoya
- Recap, Gamebook

Game information

First quarter

- Jameel McClain 6-yard fumble return (Billy Cundiff Kick) Ravens 7–0
- Joe McKnight 107-yard kickoff return (Nick Folk Kick) TIE 7–7
- Billy Cundiff 38-yard field goal Ravens 10–7, Drive: 9 plays, 70 yards, 5:15.
- Ray Rice 3-yard run (Billy Cundiff Kick) Ravens 17–7, Drive: 8 plays, 59 yards, 3:31.

Second quarter

- Billy Cundiff 38-yard field goal Ravens 20–7, Drive: 4 plays, 4 yards, 0:47.
- Jarret Johnson 26-yard fumble return (Billy Cundiff Kick) Ravens 27–7
- David Harris 35-yard interception return (Nick Folk Kick) Ravens 27–14
- Nick Folk 40-yard field goal Ravens 27–17, Drive: 7 plays, 25 yards, 2:27.

Third quarter

- Lardarius Webb 73-yard interception return (Billy Cundiff Kick) Ravens 34–17

Fourth quarter

Top passers

- NYJ – Mark Sanchez- 11/35, 119 yards, 1INT
- BAL – Joe Flacco- 10/31, 163 yards, 1INT

Top rushers

- NYJ – Shonn Greene- 10 rushes, 23 yards
- BAL – Ray Rice- 25 rushes, 66 yards

Top receivers

- NYJ – Derek Mason- 2 receptions, 37 yards
- BAL – Ray Rice- 2 receptions, 64 yards

Top tacklers

- NYJ – Sione Pouha- 8 tackles, 1 tackle for loss
- BAL – Cary Williams- 8 tackles

Hoping to rebound from their Week 3 road loss to the Raiders, the Jets flew to M&T Bank Stadium for a Week 4 Sunday night battle with the Baltimore Ravens, also head coach Rex Ryan's first return to Baltimore since leaving the Ravens following the 2008 season. Ryan served as the Ravens' defensive line coach, defensive coordinator, and assistant head coach from the 1999 to 2008 seasons, and was part of their 2000 Super Bowl-winning squad. New York trailed early in the first quarter with Ravens linebacker Jameel McClain returning a fumble 6 yards for a touchdown. The Jets would respond with running back Joe McKnight returning a kickoff 107 yards for a touchdown. Baltimore would regain the lead with kicker Billy Cundiff getting a 38-yard field goal, followed by running back Ray Rice getting a 3-yard touchdown run. The Ravens added onto their lead in the second quarter with Cundiff making another 38-yard field goal, followed by linebacker Jarret Johnson returning a fumble 26 yards for a touchdown. New York responded with linebacker David Harris returning an interception 36 yards for a touchdown, followed by a 40-yard field goal from kicker Nick Folk. Baltimore came right back in the third quarter with cornerback Lardarius Webb returning an interception 73 yards for a touchdown. From there, the Ravens' defense prevented any comeback attempt.

=== Week 5: at New England Patriots ===
Week Five: New York Jets at New England Patriots – Game summary

| Quarter | 1 | 2 | 3 | 4 | Total |
|---|---|---|---|---|---|
| Jets | 0 | 7 | 7 | 7 | 21 |
| Patriots | 7 | 3 | 14 | 6 | 30 |

at Gillette Stadium, Foxborough, Massachusetts

- Date: October 9
- Game time: 4:15 p.m. EDT
- Game weather: 82 °F (28 °C), sunny and warm
- Game attendance: 68,756
- Referee: Jerome Boger
- TV announcers (CBS): Jim Nantz and Phil Simms
- Recap, Gamebook

Game information

First quarter

- BenJarvus Green-Ellis 3-yard run (Stephen Gostkowski Kick) Patriots 7–0, Drive: 5 plays, 64 yards, 2:34.

Second quarter

- Stephen Gostkowski 44-yard field goal Patriots 10–0, Drive: 6 plays, 18 yards, 3:06.
- Shonn Greene 3-yard run (Nick Folk Kick) Patriots 10–7, Drive: 13 plays, 78 yards, 7:54.

Third quarter

- Deion Branch 2-yard pass from Tom Brady (Stephen Gostkowski Kick) Patriots 17–7, Drive: 4 plays, 80 yards, 2:14.
- Jeremy Kerley 9-yard pass from Mark Sanchez (Nick Folk Kick) Patriots 17–14, Drive: 3 plays, 20 yards, 1:43.
- BenJarvus Green-Ellis 3-yard run (Stephen Gostkowski Kick) Patriots 24–14, Drive: 11 plays, 77 yards, 4:12.

Fourth quarter

- Stephen Gostkowski 24-yard field goal Patriots 27–14, Drive: 6 plays, 19 yards, 2:17.
- Santonio Holmes 21-yard pass from Mark Sanchez (Nick Folk Kick) Patriots 27–21, Drive: 11 plays, 85 yards, 5:43.
- Stephen Gostkowski 28-yard field goal Patriots 30–21, Drive: 13 plays, 69 yards, 6:12.

Top passers

- NYJ – Mark Sanchez- 16/26, 166 yards, 2TD
- NE – Tom Brady- 24/33, 321 yards, 1TD 1INT

Top rushers

- NYJ – Shonn Greene- 21 rushes, 83 yards, 1TD
- NE – BenJarvus Green-Ellis- 27 rushes, 136 yards, 2TD

Top receivers

- NYJ – Santonio Holmes- 4 receptions, 60 yards, 1TD
- NE – Wes Welker- 5 receptions, 124 yards

Top tacklers

- NYJ – David Harris- 9 tackles, 1 sack, 1 tackle for loss
  Eric Smith- 9 tackles, 1 tackle for loss
- NE – Gary Guyton- 9 tackles
  Patrick Chung- 9 tackles

=== Week 6: vs. Miami Dolphins ===
Week Six: Miami Dolphins at New York Jets – Game summary

| Quarter | 1 | 2 | 3 | 4 | Total |
|---|---|---|---|---|---|
| Dolphins | 3 | 3 | 0 | 0 | 6 |
| Jets | 7 | 7 | 3 | 7 | 24 |

at MetLife Stadium, East Rutherford, New Jersey

- Date: October 17
- Game time: 8:30 p.m. EDT
- Game weather: 62 °F (17 °C), clear
- Game attendance: 78,912
- Referee: Tony Corrente
- TV announcers (ESPN): Mike Tirico, Ron Jaworski, Jon Gruden and Suzy Kolber
- Recap, Gamebook

Game information

First quarter

- Dan Carpenter 23-yard field goal Dolphins 3–0, Drive: 7 plays, 42 yards, 2:46.
- Darrelle Revis 100-yard interception return (Nick Folk Kick) Jets 7–3

Second quarter

- Dan Carpenter 21-yard field goal Jets 7–6, Drive: 9 plays, 77 yards, 3:45.
- Mark Sanchez 5-yard run (Nick Folk Kick) Jets 14–6, Drive: 11 plays, 81 yards, 5:40.

Third quarter

- Nick Folk 28-yard field goal Jets 17–6, Drive: 13 plays, 79 yards, 7:16.

Fourth quarter

- Santonio Holmes 38-yard pass from Mark Sanchez (Nick Folk Kick) Jets 24–6, Drive: 4 plays, 50 yards, 1:37.

Top passers

- MIA – Matt Moore- 16/34, 204, 2INT
- NYJ – Mark Sanchez- 14/25, 201 yards, 1TD

Top rushers

- MIA – Reggie Bush- 10 rushes, 71 yards
- NYJ – Shonn Greene- 21 rushes, 74 yards

Top receivers

- MIA – Brandon Marshall- 6 receptions, 106 yards
- NYJ – Santonio Holmes- 3 receptions, 63 yards, 1TD

Top tacklers

- MIA – Yeremiah Bell- 7 tackles
- NYJ – Jim Leonhard- 7 tackles
  Calvin Pace- 7 tackles, 2 sacks, 1 tackle for loss

=== Week 7: vs San Diego Chargers ===
Week Seven: San Diego Chargers at New York Jets – Game summary

| Quarter | 1 | 2 | 3 | 4 | Total |
|---|---|---|---|---|---|
| Chargers | 7 | 14 | 0 | 0 | 21 |
| Jets | 3 | 7 | 7 | 10 | 27 |

at MetLife Stadium, East Rutherford, New Jersey

- Date: October 23
- Game time: 1:00 p.m. EDT/10:00 a.m. PDT
- Game weather: 58 °F (14 °C), sunny
- Game attendance: 79,088
- Referee: Ron Winter
- TV announcers (CBS): Jim Nantz and Phil Simms
- Recap, Gamebook

Game information

First quarter

- Donald Butler 37-yard fumble return (Nick Novak Kick) Chargers 7–0
- Nick Folk 35-yard field goal Chargers 7–3, Drive: 8 plays, 64 yards, 4:46.

Second quarter

- Antonio Gates 2-yard pass from Philip Rivers (Nick Novak Kick) Chargers 14–3, Drive: 14 plays, 76 yards, 6:28.
- Plaxico Burress 3-yard pass from Mark Sanchez (Nick Folk Kick) Chargers 14–10, Drive: 8 plays, 77 yards, 4:53.
- Mike Tolbert 1-yard run (Nick Novak Kick) Chargers 21–10, Drive: 11 plays, 87 yards, 6:02.

Third quarter

- Plaxico Burress 4-yard pass from Mark Sanchez (Nick Folk Kick) Chargers 21–17, Drive: 10 plays, 55 yards, 4:33.

Fourth quarter

- Plaxico Burress 3-yard pass From Mark Sanchez (Nick Folk Kick) Jets 24–21, Drive: 6 plays, 19 yards, 2:15.
- Nick Folk 30-yard field goal Jets 27–21, Drive: 9 plays, 35 yards, 3:47.

Top passers

- SD – Philip Rivers- 16/32, 179, 1TD 2INT
- NYJ – Mark Sanchez- 18/33, 172, 3TD 1INT

Top rushers

- SD – Mike Tolbert- 11 rushes, 58 yards, 1TD
- NYJ – Shonn Greene- 20 rushes, 112 yards

Top receivers

- SD – Antonio Gates- 5 receptions, 54 yards, 1TD
- NYJ – Dustin Keller- 4 receptions, 53 yards
  Plaxico Burress- 4 receptions, 25 yards, 3TD

Top tacklers

- SD – Donald Butler- 9 tackles, 1TD
- NYJ – Eric Smith- 10 tackles

=== Week 9: at Buffalo Bills ===
Week Nine: New York Jets at Buffalo Bills – Game summary

| Quarter | 1 | 2 | 3 | 4 | Total |
|---|---|---|---|---|---|
| Jets | 0 | 3 | 17 | 7 | 27 |
| Bills | 0 | 0 | 3 | 8 | 11 |

at Ralph Wilson Stadium, Orchard Park, New York

- Date: November 6
- Game time: 1:00 p.m. EST
- Game weather: 57 °F (14 °C), sunny
- Game attendance: 70,133
- Referee: Ed Hochuli
- TV announcers (CBS): Jim Nantz and Phil Simms

Game information

First quarter

Second quarter

Third quarter

Fourth quarter

Top passers

- NYJ –
- BUF –

Top rushers

- NYJ –
- BUF –

Top receivers

- NYJ –
- BUF –

Top tacklers

- NYJ –
- BUF –

=== Week 10: vs. New England Patriots ===
Week Ten: New England Patriots at New York Jets – Game summary

| Quarter | 1 | 2 | 3 | 4 | Total |
|---|---|---|---|---|---|
| Patriots | 6 | 7 | 10 | 14 | 37 |
| Jets | 0 | 9 | 0 | 7 | 16 |

at MetLife Stadium, East Rutherford, New Jersey

- Date: November 13
- Game time: 8:20 p.m. EST
- Game weather: 58 °F (14 °C), clear
- Game attendance: 79,088
- Referee: Gene Steratore
- TV announcers (NBC): Al Michaels, Cris Collinsworth and Michele Tafoya

Game information

First quarter

Second quarter

Third quarter

Fourth quarter

Top passers

- NE –
- NYJ –

Top rushers

- NE –
- NYJ –

Top receivers

- NE –
- NYJ –

Top tacklers

- NE –
- NYJ –

This marked the first time the Jets were swept by the Patriots since 2007.

=== Week 11: at Denver Broncos ===
Week Eleven: New York Jets at Denver Broncos – Game summary

| Quarter | 1 | 2 | 3 | 4 | Total |
|---|---|---|---|---|---|
| Jets | 0 | 3 | 7 | 3 | 13 |
| Broncos | 3 | 0 | 7 | 7 | 17 |

at Sports Authority Field at Mile High, Denver, Colorado

- Date: November 17
- Game time: 8:20 p.m. EST/6:20 p.m. MST
- Game weather: 54 °F (12 °C), partly cloudy
- Game attendance: 74,746
- Referee: Bill Leavy
- TV announcers (NFLN): Brad Nessler, Mike Mayock and Alex Flanagan

Game information

First quarter

Second quarter

Third quarter

Fourth quarter

Top passers

- NYJ –
- DEN –

Top rushers

- NYJ –
- DEN –

Top receivers

- NYJ –
- DEN –

Top tacklers

- NYJ –
- DEN –

=== Week 12: vs. Buffalo Bills ===
Week Twelve: Buffalo Bills at New York Jets – Game summary

| Quarter | 1 | 2 | 3 | 4 | Total |
|---|---|---|---|---|---|
| Bills | 7 | 7 | 7 | 3 | 24 |
| Jets | 0 | 14 | 7 | 7 | 28 |

at MetLife Stadium, East Rutherford, New Jersey

- Date: November 27
- Game time: 1:00 p.m. EST
- Game weather: 60 °F (16 °C), partly cloudy
- Game attendance: 79,088
- Referee: Carl Cheffers
- TV announcers (CBS): Marv Albert and Rich Gannon

Game information

First quarter

Second quarter

Third quarter

Fourth quarter

Top passers

- BUF – Ryan Fitzpatrick
- NYJ – Mark Sanchez

Top rushers

- BUF – C. J. Spiller
- NYJ – Shonn Greene

Top receivers

- BUF – Brad Smith
- NYJ – Dustin Keller

Top tacklers

- BUF – Nick Barnett
- NYJ – Darrelle Revis

=== Week 13: at Washington Redskins ===
Week Thirteen: New York Jets at Washington Redskins – Game summary

| Quarter | 1 | 2 | 3 | 4 | Total |
|---|---|---|---|---|---|
| Jets | 7 | 3 | 3 | 21 | 34 |
| Redskins | 7 | 6 | 0 | 6 | 19 |

at FedExField, Landover, Maryland

- Date: December 4
- Game time: 1:00 p.m. EST
- Game weather: 53 °F (12 °C), sunny
- Game attendance: 74,121
- Referee: John Parry
- TV announcers (CBS): Ian Eagle and Dan Fouts

Game information

First quarter

Second quarter

Third quarter

Fourth quarter

Top passers

- NYJ –
- WAS –

Top rushers

- NYJ –
- WAS –

Top receivers

- NYJ –
- WAS –

Top tacklers

- NYJ –
- WAS –

=== Week 14: vs. Kansas City Chiefs ===
Week Fourteen: Kansas City Chiefs at New York Jets – Game summary

| Quarter | 1 | 2 | 3 | 4 | Total |
|---|---|---|---|---|---|
| Chiefs | 3 | 0 | 0 | 7 | 10 |
| Jets | 7 | 21 | 7 | 2 | 37 |

at MetLife Stadium, East Rutherford, New Jersey

- Date: December 11
- Game time: 1:00 p.m. EST
- Game weather: 37 °F (3 °C), sunny
- Game attendance: 79,088
- Referee: Terry McAulay
- TV announcers (CBS): Ian Eagle and Dan Fouts

Game information

First quarter

Second quarter

Third quarter

Fourth quarter

Top passers

- KC –
- NYJ –

Top rushers

- KC –
- NYJ –

Top receivers

- KC –
- NYJ –

Top tacklers

- KC –
- NYJ –

The Jets won easily in a crushing rout, with the final score overstating the closeness of the game as the Chiefs' only touchdown came in garbage time after the game was already decided. The Chiefs offense gained only 4 total yards in the first two quarters. The Chiefs were also plagued with penalties, finishing the game with 11 penalties total. The Jets' final touchdown drive in the third quarter proved to be a particularly humiliating stretch. Starting from their own 10-yard line, the Jets gained 81 penalty yards on 5 penalties committed by the Chiefs, including a rare penalty directly assessed against head coach Todd Haley for unsportsmanlike conduct. The Jets improved to 8–5 and could "control their playoff destiny" at this point in the season, guaranteed to make it to the playoffs by winning the rest of their games.

=== Week 15: at Philadelphia Eagles ===
Week Fifteen: New York Jets at Philadelphia Eagles – Game summary

| Quarter | 1 | 2 | 3 | 4 | Total |
|---|---|---|---|---|---|
| Jets | 0 | 13 | 0 | 6 | 19 |
| Eagles | 14 | 14 | 10 | 7 | 45 |

at Lincoln Financial Field, Philadelphia, Pennsylvania

- Date: December 18
- Game time: 4:15 p.m. EST
- Game weather: 35 °F (2 °C), sunny
- Game attendance: 69,144
- Referee: Clete Blakeman
- TV announcers (CBS): Marv Albert and Rich Gannon

Game information

First quarter

Second quarter

Third quarter

Fourth quarter

Top passers

- NYJ –
- PHI –

Top rushers

- NYJ –
- PHI –

Top receivers

- NYJ –
- PHI –

Top tacklers

- NYJ –
- PHI –

=== Week 16: vs. New York Giants ===
Week Sixteen: New York Giants at New York Jets – Game summary

| Quarter | 1 | 2 | 3 | 4 | Total |
|---|---|---|---|---|---|
| Giants | 0 | 10 | 7 | 12 | 29 |
| Jets | 7 | 0 | 0 | 7 | 14 |

at MetLife Stadium, East Rutherford, New Jersey

- Date: December 24
- Game time: 1:00 p.m. EST
- Game weather: 35 °F (2 °C), sunny
- Game attendance: 79,088
- Referee: Pete Morelli
- TV announcers (Fox): Kenny Albert, Daryl Johnston and Tony Siragusa

Game information

First quarter

Second quarter

Third quarter

Fourth quarter

Top passers

- NYG –
- NYJ –

Top rushers

- NYG –
- NYJ –

Top receivers

- NYG –
- NYJ –

Top tacklers

- NYG –
- NYJ –

As of 2025, this remains the last time the Jets lost to the Giants.

=== Week 17: at Miami Dolphins ===
Week Seventeen: New York Jets at Miami Dolphins – Game summary

| Quarter | 1 | 2 | 3 | 4 | Total |
|---|---|---|---|---|---|
| Jets | 7 | 3 | 0 | 7 | 17 |
| Dolphins | 3 | 3 | 0 | 13 | 19 |

at Sun Life Stadium, Miami Gardens, Florida

- Date: January 1
- Game time: 1:00 p.m. EST
- Game weather: 78 °F (26 °C), sunny
- Game attendance: 65,811
- Referee: Jerome Boger
- TV announcers (CBS): Greg Gumbel & Dan Dierdorf

Game information

First quarter

Second quarter

Third quarter

Fourth quarter

Top passers

- NYJ –
- MIA –

Top rushers

- NYJ –
- MIA –

Top receivers

- NYJ –
- MIA –

Top tacklers

- NYJ –
- MIA –

This would be the beginning of the Jets 15-year playoff drought (2011-2025) and their last road loss to the Dolphins until 2016.
