= Robert Malone (American football) =

American football player (born 1988)

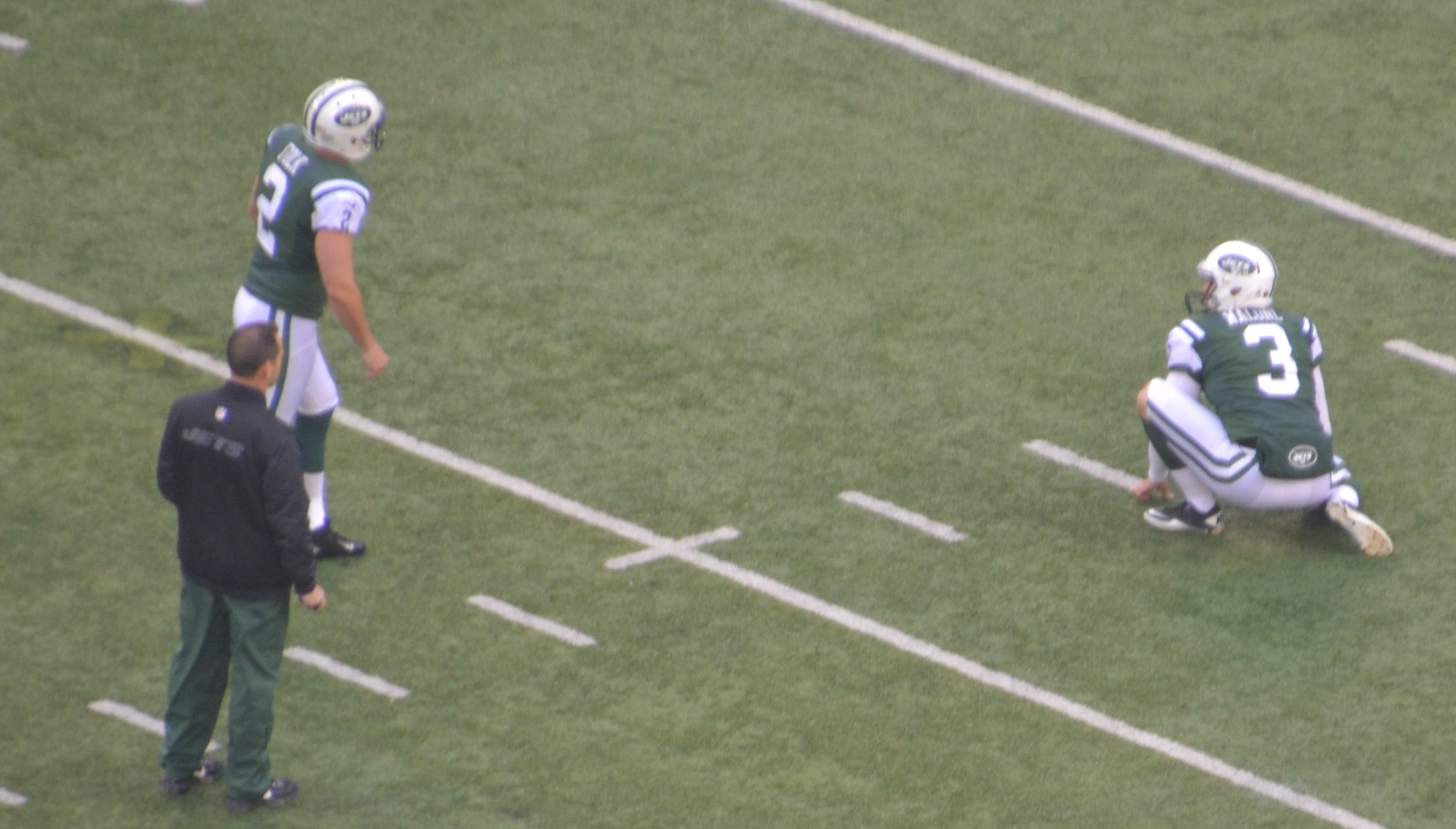
- Malone (#3) during pre-game warm-ups with the New York Jets in 2012

No. 1, 2, 3
- Position: Punter

Personal information
- Born: February 4, 1988 (age 38); Orange, California, U.S.
- Listed height: 6 ft 2 in (1.88 m)
- Listed weight: 243 lb (110 kg)

Career information
- High school: King (Riverside, California)
- College: Fresno State
- NFL draft: 2010: undrafted

Career history
- Jacksonville Jaguars (2010)*; Tampa Bay Buccaneers (2010); Detroit Lions (2011); San Diego Chargers (2012)*; New York Jets (2012–2013); Washington Redskins (2014)*; New York Giants (2015)*
- * Offseason or practice squad member only

Awards and highlights
- First-team All-WAC (2009)

Career NFL statistics
- Punts: 157
- Punt yards: 6,993
- Average: 44.5
- Stats at Pro Football Reference

Robert James Malone (born February 4, 1988) is an American former professional football player who was a punter in the National Football League (NFL). He was signed by the Jacksonville Jaguars as an undrafted free agent in 2010. He played college football for the Fresno State Bulldogs. He was also a member of the Tampa Bay Buccaneers, Detroit Lions, San Diego Chargers, New York Jets, Washington Redskins and New York Giants.

== College career ==
Malone played college football at California State University, Fresno. There he was a first-team All-WAC selection after punting 44 times for a 45.2-yard average, with 17 of his kicks downed inside the opponent's 20-yard line. He also kicked 15 punts for 50 or more yards, including a career long of 74. In his collegiate career with the Bulldogs, Malone played in 41 games and punted 120 times for 5,117 yards with a 42.6-yard average and 44 punts inside the 20.

== Professional career ==
=== Jacksonville Jaguars ===
Malone originally entered the NFL as an undrafted free agent with the Jacksonville Jaguars in the spring of 2010. However, he was released before training camp by the Jaguars, who stuck with their incumbent punter Adam Podlesh.

=== Tampa Bay Buccaneers ===
Malone was signed by the Buccaneers on October 13, 2010, to replace Chris Bryan as the team's punter. He was waived on August 29, 2011.

=== Detroit Lions ===
On November 11, 2011, Malone signed with the Detroit Lions after an injury to Ryan Donahue. He was waived on November 15 and was replaced by Ben Graham.

=== San Diego Chargers ===
He signed with the Chargers on May 30, 2012.

=== New York Jets ===
Malone was signed by the New York Jets on September 4, 2012. He became the team's starting punter with the release of incumbent T. J. Conley. He was released on September 16, 2013.

=== Washington Redskins ===
Malone signed a reserve/future contract with the Washington Redskins on December 31, 2013. He was waived for final roster cuts on August 29, 2014.

=== New York Giants ===
Malone signed a contract with the New York Giants in 2015. On September 1, 2015, he was waived by the Giants.

== Personal life ==
Robert Malone grew up in Riverside, California and went to Martin Luther King High School. He punted for the high school football team. His cousin, Tom Malone, was an NFL punter and played college football for the USC Trojans. In October 2022, Robert was inducted into the Martin Luther King Athletic Hall of Fame.
