= Holley Mangold =

American weightlifter (born 1989)

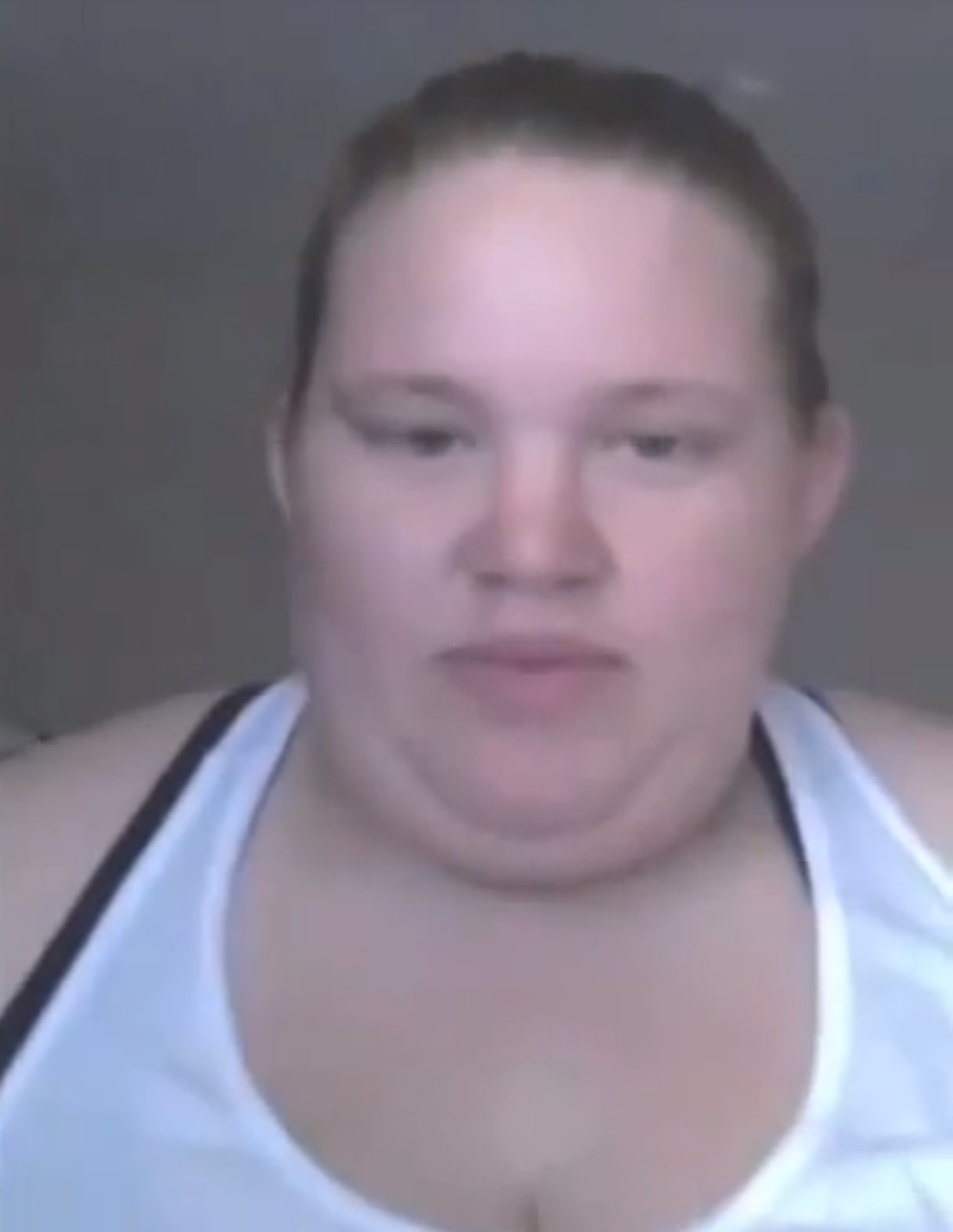
- Mangold interviewed in 2013

Personal information
- Full name: Holley Elizabeth Mangold
- Nationality: American
- Born: December 22, 1989 (age 36) Kettering, Ohio, U.S.
- Height: 5 ft 8 in (173 cm)

Sport
- Country: United States
- Sport: Olympic weightlifting, high school football

Holley Elizabeth Mangold (born December 22, 1989) is an American sportsperson from Dayton, Ohio. She was a member of the 2012 U.S. Olympic Team and competed in the superheavyweight division of the Olympic weightlifting competition. She has also appeared on The Biggest Loser.

== Early life ==
Mangold is the sister of NFL center Nick Mangold.

Mangold played high school football at Archbishop Alter High School on the offensive line and was the first girl to start in an Ohio High School State Championship football game. She dropped out of Ursuline College in May 2010; she had attended Ursuline on a track scholarship.

== Career ==
Mangold began weightlifting in 2008. She stands 5 feet 8 inches (1.73 m) tall. As of 2014, her in-competition weight was 370 pounds (170 kg).

=== 2012 London Olympics ===
Mangold's personal weightlifting record total is 255 kilos (562.2 pounds) from a 110 kilo (242.5 pounds) snatch and 145 kilo (319.7 pounds) clean and jerk. That aggregate total landed her one of two spots on the 2012 U.S. Olympic Team. However, before she went to London to compete, Mangold tore a tendon in her wrist and required three cortisone shots before the super heavyweight competition. Mangold placed tenth out of the 14 weightlifters in her division.

=== Television ===
A video documentary about Mangold's life premiered on MTV's "True Life" on June 30, 2011 in an episode entitled "I'm the Big Girl."

Mangold was a participant in The Biggest Loser: Second Chances 2, the 15th season of the TV series, The Biggest Loser. She was eliminated after seven episodes.

On June 1, 2015, an Instagram video of Mangold spoofing J. J. Watt's box jumps went viral.
