= Archbishop Alter High School =

Location
- 940 East David Rd; Kettering, (Montgomery County), Ohio 45429; United States; 39°40′48″N 84°9′6″W

Information
- Type: Private, coeducational
- Religious affiliation: Roman Catholic
- Established: 1962
- Oversight: Archdiocese of Cincinnati
- Principal: Lourdes Lambert
- Teaching staff: 43.9 (on an FTE basis)
- Grades: 9–12
- Student to teacher ratio: 13.8
- Colors: Brown and gold
- Athletics conference: Greater Catholic League
- Mascot: Knight
- Team name: Knights
- Newspaper: The Knight Times
- Yearbook: Excalibur
- Tuition: $10,800 (parish) $11,760 (non-parish)
- Website: alterhs.org

Archbishop Alter High School, also known as Alter High School, is a Catholic high school in Kettering, Ohio, United States. It is operated by the Roman Catholic Archdiocese of Cincinnati and is named after Archbishop Karl Joseph Alter.

== History ==
In October 1958, Catholics of the Dayton area pledged $4,953,050 to help pay the costs of building Catholic high schools in the area. Among the schools built with this money were Archbishop Alter High School and its mirror image, Carroll High School, built the previous year. Development of Alter High School was led by Reverend Paul F. Leibold, and, at the request of the people, the school was named after Archbishop Karl Alter, who was born on August 18, 1885, and died on August 23, 1977.

The school's first students began classes on September 5, 1962, with an incoming class of 250 freshmen. In each of the next three years a new freshman class was added and by 1965, the school had students in grades 9 through 12. The first class graduated in 1966.

Alter High's first principal was Reverend Edward F. Haskamp, serving from 1962 to 1970. In 2005, Alter High named Fr. James Manning, former pastor of St. Albert the Great Parish in Kettering, as its first president.

== Faculty ==
Alter High School's faculty is composed of diocesan priests of the Archdiocese of Cincinnati, Sisters of Charity of Mount St. Joseph, and lay teachers.

== Academics ==
Alter features a strong STEM Curriculum through a partnership with Project Lead the Way. Alter has earned a Governor's Award for STEM education and has added six new labs to the school since 2009. 20 students participated in the State Science Fair, and four earned perfect scores in 2014. Every student at Alter is now equipped with a laptop computer complete with Microsoft Office software. The OGT pass rate at Alter is 100%.

The school provides AP classes, which offer the prospect of college credit as well as a weighted grade. The Taylor College Lab at Alter was provided by a generous donation and operated by Sinclair College. It offers students a way to take classes for college credit and remain on Alter's campus. Students use this facility to take practice exams for ACT, SAT, and other academic tests. They also work on college résumés and applications in the lab and along with the guidance office was responsible for the $15,500,000 full and partial academic, athletic and arts scholarships generated by the Class of 2014.

The school day begins at 8:00 AM and ends at 3:05 PM. The schedule was changed for the 2009–2010 school year to include eight 46-minute class periods and a 25-minute lunch period, with three minutes between each period to change classes. The change has allowed the students more flexibility with choosing electives or study halls within their schedules.

== Controversy ==
In 2020, the Archdiocese of Cincinnati fired English teacher James Zimmerman, after 23 years of teaching, for being gay. The incident made national news and stirred a social media stir from current and former students alike. Many protested in solidarity with Zimmerman. On the podcast Full Circle, filmmaker David Becker, a former Alter student, claimed that this act of prejudice was the impetus behind getting his feature film Regarding Us made, which had similar themes of discrimination within the Catholic school system.

== Performing arts ==
The school offers a number of opportunities in the creative and performing arts. Alter has a performing arts wing, named the Christine Connor and Fred J. Miller Conservatory of the Arts. It was added to the building after many donations were received.

=== Bands ===
Students may participate in multiple ensembles during the year: the Marching Knights, Jazz Band, Pep Band, Wind Ensemble, String Ensemble, Woodwind and Brass Ensembles, Winter Guard and Winter Drumline. The music department has been under the direction of Todd Tucker since 2007.

The Marching Knights are the musical ambassadors for Archbishop Alter High School. In addition to their musical support and performances at football games, the band also appears at festivals and in parades in the community. Competitively, the Marching Knights perform on the Mid States Band Association (MSBA) circuit regionally, which includes bands from Ohio, Indiana, Kentucky and Michigan, and the Bands of America (BOA) circuit nationally. The band has been an MSBA Class Champion nine times since 2012, including a six-year run from 2012 to 2017, and in 2022 the Marching Knights captured their first BOA Grand National Class A Championship in Indianapolis.

The Marching Knights typically field a membership of 35 students, but are successful on the national scale despite their size. The band has been a BOA Regional Finalist by score at multiple competitions since 2012, and in 2016 won Class A at the BOA St. Louis Super Regional, notching their first Class A win at any BOA competition. Due to their performance at the 2013 Atlanta BOA Super Regional, the group was asked by Winter Guard International (WGI) to be one of three groups to help pilot their new division, WGI Winds, in the spring of 2014 by performing in exhibition at two WGI regional competitions.

Since 2009, the band has made annual trips to the BOA Grand National Championships in Indianapolis (except 2020, due to the COVID-19 pandemic), and have seen increased success during that span. The Knights first broke into Grand National semi-finals in 2013 (i.e., were in the top four Class A bands), marking the first of four appearances over the next five years, and 6 appearances over the next 10. In 2014 and 2016, the Marching Knights found the podium in addition to their semi-finals appearance, where they finished 3rd in both years. In 2021, at Grand Nationals, the band returned to the semi-finals for the first time since 2017, finished 2nd, and won the Class A Visual caption, marking both their highest placement to date and their first caption win at Nationals.

In 2022, the Marching Knights won Class A at the Bands of America Grand National Championships with their show "Overjoyed", which featured the music of Stevie Wonder. During their preliminary performance, the band scored an 81.500 and finished 37th, marking their highest overall finish at Grand Nationals. Their score of 79.400 in Semi-Finals is their highest final-show score at Grand Nationals.

=== Band shows ===
Year	Show title	MSBA score	MSBA placement (class)	BOA score	BOA placement in class
2007	Cirque Du Soleil	63.7	5th (A)	Did not compete in BOA	
2008	Salvation	70.50	7th (tie) (A)	Did not compete in BOA	
2009	In the Dark of [K]night	59.6	12th (A)	59.40	13th
2010	The Gift	75.90	5th (A)	60.10	11th
2011	New Orleans Sketches	83.70	2nd (A)	57.95	16th
2012	Blue Moon	88.50	1st (A)	64.90	8th
2013	Magic Show	88.90	1st (A)	69.50	4th*
2014	Assembly Required	77.20	1st (A)	71.25	3rd*
2015	Hangar 18	77.70	1st (A)	71.85	6th
2016	Ghost Story	84.60	1st (A)	73.20	3rd*
2017	arOund	77.50	1st (A)	72.800	4th*
2018	JustinTime	74.80	6th (AA)	66.300	7th
2019	Sherlock	85.8	1st (tie) (AA)	73.950	5th
2020	The Long and Winding Road	Cancelled	due to COVID-19	Canceled	due to COVID-19
2021	Feels So Good	79.5	1st (A)	74.850	2nd*
2022	Overjoyed	80.2	1st (A)	79.400	1st*
2023	Scenes from an Italian Restaurant	79.7	2nd (A)	75.650	5th

*Semi-finals appearance

Winter Guard shows:

2014 Seize the Day
2015 Music Box
2016 It Gets Better
2017 Rise to Power
2018 The Original Imagineer
2019 Workin' it Out!

WGI Winds:

2014 Magic Show (as exhibition)
2015 fiVe
2016–present: Did not compete

=== Theater ===
In the late 1990s and early 2000s, Alter's theater program grew into its own department with additional classes and productions. Several shows since 2001 have brought first and second place state awards in the Group Musical, Solo, Lighting, Sound, Design, Duet and Playwriting categories, including How to Succeed in Business without Really Trying, Teahouse of the August Moon, Anything Goes, and Cabaret.

Alter has gained acclaim in the Miami Valley for excellence in arts education due to strong support from the community and administration and a tradition of excellence over the years by theater directors Bob Herman, Trace Crawford, Bryan Wallingford, Katie Arber, and currently Megan Wean Sears. Another unique facet of the program is Alter's Thespian Troupe (#5802), a chapter of an international organization dedicated to the celebration of achievement in theatre arts education. Alter takes part in many thespian-related activities.

=== Past productions ===
- 2022-23 - Clue, The Anxiety Project, Alter's Got Talent, Singin' in the Rain
- 2021-22 - The Play That Goes Wrong, The Lightning Thief, Newsies
- 2020-21 - Breaking the Fifth Wall, Joseph and the Amazing Technicolor Dreamcoat
- 2019-20 - 26 Pebbles, Freaky Friday, Once on This Island
- 2018-19 - The Guys, Steel Magnolias, Songs for a New World, Thoroughly Modern Millie
- 2017-18 - Lost in Yonkers, Godspell
- 2016-17 - And Then They Came for Me, The Drowsy Chaperone
- 2015-16 - Blithe Spirit, Aida
- 2014-15 - The Musical Comedy Murders of 1940, Into the Woods
- 2013-14 - Boeing-Boeing, Children of Eden
- 2012-13 - The Bad Seed, Beauty and the Beast
- 2011-12 - Willy Wonka & the Chocolate Factory, Bye Bye Birdie
- 2010-11 - The Snow Queen, Oklahoma!
- 2009-10 - Once Upon a Pandora's Box, Cinderella
- 2008-09 - Miss Nelson Is Missing!, Grease
- 2007-08 - Inspecting Carol, Thoroughly Modern Millie
- 2006-07 - Romeo and Juliet, Little Shop of Horrors
- 2005-06 - Arsenic and Old Lace, Seussical
- 2004-05 - Epic Proportions, Godspell
- 2003-04 - The Odd Couple, How to Succeed in Business Without Really Trying
- 2002-03 - The Teahouse of the August Moon, 42nd Street
- 2001-02 - The Witching Hour, Anything Goes
- 2000-01 - The Rivals, Into the Woods
- 1999-2000 - The Visit, Will Rogers Follies
- 1998-99 - Don't Drink the Water, Guys and Dolls
- 1997-98 - The Musical Comedy Murders of 1940, Little Shop of Horrors
- 1977-78 - Oliver

=== Dance ===
Alter High School is home to the largest all female high school dance team in Ohio, the Lancerettes. They are a non-competing team led by Cynthia Duckro Jecker, a 1994 graduate of the school. The Lancerettes perform during halftime at 4-5 football, basketball, and soccer games every season. The Lancerettes of Alter High School have 74 members and are known for their white boots and high kick routines.

== Clubs and activities ==
The school's Latin Club functions as a local chapter of both the Ohio Junior Classical League (OJCL) and the National Junior Classical League (NJCL).

== Sports ==
Archbishop Alter High School's team nickname is the Knights; their colors are brown and gold. Generally, both the boys' and girls' teams belong to the GCL-CoEd (Greater Catholic League).

Home basketball and volleyball games are played in the school gym. The school also owns a soccer field encircled by a track, where the soccer team plays its home games and the track and field team practices. Although they have a four-lane track with a football field, some home football games are typically held at other local high schools such as Fairmont High School or Centerville High School.

Holley Mangold played at the school on the football team’s offensive line and was the first girl to start in an Ohio High School State Championship football game.

=== Ohio High School Athletic Association state championships ===
- Boys' football - 2008, 2009
- Boys' basketball - 1978, 1999, 2001, 2024
- Boys' cross country - 1996
- Boys' golf - 1992, 1993, 1998, 1999, 2022, 2023, 2024, 2025
- Boys' soccer - 1987, 1988, 1996, 1998, 2016
- Girls' soccer - 2016, 2019
- Girls' volleyball - 2002, 2003, 2006
- Girls' basketball - 2008, 2015 (completed a perfect 30-0 2014-2015 season), 2016, 2017, 2022
- Girls' cross country - 2007

=== Other athletic accomplishments ===
- Boys' tennis - team state champs 1976*
- Girls' tennis - team state champs 2001*
- Boys' volleyball - team state champs 2011, 2012, 2014, 2015, 2016, 2017*

*Note - The OHSAA does not hold team state championship tournaments for girls' and boys' tennis. Rather, they are administered by the state coaches' association of their respective sports. Boys' volleyball was administered by the state coaches' association until becoming a sanctioned OHSAA sport beginning with the 2022–2023 academic year.

=== Boys' sports ===
A full listing of the boys' sports offered at Alter High School:

- Golf
- Soccer
- Football
- Cross country
- Basketball
- Bowling
- Swimming & diving
- Wrestling
- Tennis
- Ice hockey
- Lacrosse
- Baseball
- Track & field
- Volleyball

=== Girls' sports ===
A full listing of the girls' sports offered at Alter High School:

- Cheerleading
- Soccer
- Cross country
- Golf
- Volleyball
- Tennis
- Basketball
- Bowling
- Gymnastics
- Swimming & diving
- Softball
- Track & field

=== Rivalries ===
Alter High has a number of sports rivals. Depending on the sport, the school's biggest games each year are against local public school rivals Kettering Fairmont High School (Ohio) or Centerville High School. Chaminade Julienne High School, Bishop Fenwick High School (Franklin, Ohio) and Carroll High School are the three local Catholic School rivals. Alter has won 10 GCL All-Sports trophies in a row.

== Spirit ==
Alter High School is marked by the school spirit of its students. Every Friday is Spirit Day, on which students are allowed to wear a spirit shirt of the school colors along with the standard uniform pants. Sporting events, especially football and basketball games, are well-attended by students. A tradition of dress up "themes" for each of the home football games has developed as a fun display of school spirit. Past themes include "Knight Night" and "Alter Teacher Night." The theme of the homecoming game is always "Toga Night." Pep rallies are common on the days of rivalry games.

=== Alma mater ===
The alma mater is played by the school band at the end of every pep rally and on various other occasions. While it is played, students extend their arms over the shoulders and neck of those to their left and right and sway together with the music. When the lyrics reach "High in Hope and Spirit," the student unjoin and proceed to raise and lower their right arms, index finger extended as if pointing, holding the position at the end of each line until the song ends. The alma mater was written by one of the first nuns to teach at the school.

=== Fight song ===
Although not as common as the alma mater, Alter High School also has a fight song which may be sung on occasions including a team bus ride to a sporting event or after a victory, but is most commonly sung on the bus after a football victory. After the game, the team typically goes over to the student section and sing the fight song. It was written by one of the first nuns to teach at Alter.

== Notable alumni ==
- Connor Bazelak - quarterback for Tampa Bay Buccaneers in the National Football League (NFL)
- Chris Borland - football player for the San Francisco 49ers in the NFL
- David Bradley - inventor of the Control-Alt-Delete keyboard combination
- Megan Courtney - volleyball player
- Theresa Gavarone - politician
- Jeff Graham - wide receiver in the NFL
- Timothy Keating - retired admiral, United States Navy
- Randy Leen - former professional golfer
- Holley Mangold - Olympic weightlifter
- Nick Mangold - football player for the New York Jets in the NFL
- Steve Martino - director (Ice Age: Continental Drift and Horton Hears a Who!)
- Jim Paxson - basketball player and general manager in the National Basketball Association (NBA)
- John Paxson - basketball player and general manager in the NBA
- Jeff Reboulet - baseball player in the MLB
- Madeline Rogero - first female mayor of Knoxville, Tennessee
- Stephen Scaia - producer, writer
- Chris Thomas - professional basketball coach
- Joe Thuney - football player with the Chicago Bears in the NFL
- Malik Zaire - football player in the National Collegiate Athletic Association
