= Eddie Jones (linebacker) =

American football player (born 1988)

No. 58, 99
- Position: Defensive lineman / Outside linebacker

Personal information
- Born: January 11, 1988 (age 38); Henderson, Texas, U.S.
- Listed height: 6 ft 2 in (1.88 m)
- Listed weight: 255 lb (116 kg)

Career information
- College: Texas
- NFL draft: 2011: undrafted

Career history
- New York Jets (2011); St. Louis Rams (2011)*; New York Jets (2012)*
- * Offseason or practice squad member only

Career NFL statistics
- Games played: 1
- Stats at Pro Football Reference

Eddie Lewis Jones, Jr. (born January 11, 1988) is an American former professional football player who was a linebacker in the National Football League (NFL). He played college football for the Texas Longhorns, and was signed by the New York Jets as an undrafted free agent in 2011. Jones was also a member of the St. Louis Rams.

== Early life ==
Jones was considered one of the nation's best defensive linemen coming out of Kilgore High School in 2006.

Jones made all-state honorable mention as a sophomore, and was named District 17-4A Defensive Newcomer of the Year with 84 tackles (six for a loss), six sacks, eight passes broken up, three forced fumbles, and two fumble recoveries.

As a junior Jones was named first-team all-state by The Associated Press and Texas Sports Writers Association, and was selected as the District 17-4A MVP. His junior year stats were 131 tackles (ten for a loss), 11 sacks, 11 passes broken up, and one forced fumble. He helped Kilgore to the 2004 4A State Championship and a 16–0 record, and had 11 tackles and two sacks in the title game win over Dallas Lincoln.

In his senior year Jones was named first-team 4A all-state by The Associated Press and the Texas Sports Writers Association, a Parade All-American, and first-team All-USA by USA Today. He was selected again as the District 17-4A MVP after helping Kilgore to an 11–2 record with 95 tackles (11 for a loss), 11 sacks, six passes broken up, four forced fumbles, six fumble recoveries, and a blocked punt which he returned for a touchdown.

Jones' career high school stats include 310 tackles (including 27 tackles for a loss), 28 sacks, 25 passes broken up, eight forced fumbles, eight fumble recoveries, 30 pressures and a blocked punt returned for a touchdown. An all-around athlete, Jones lettered for the Kilgore basketball and baseball teams for three years.

== College career ==
At Texas, Jones was a five-year defensive end who redshirted his first year in 2006.

As a redshirt freshman in 2007, Jones appeared in 11 games at defensive end and on special teams, helping UT to sixth in the nation in rushing defense.

As a sophomore in 2008, Jones played in all 13 UT games at defensive end and on special teams, helping UT rank first in the Big 12 and 18th in the nation in scoring defense and third in the nation in rushing defense.

Jones appeared in all 14 UT games during his junior year in 2009 at defensive end and on special teams, helping UT rank 12th nationally in scoring defense and third in total defense. His junior stats included 23 tackles (16 solo and seven for a loss), five sacks, one interception (which he returned for a touchdown) and forced one fumble.

In 2010, Jones played in all 12 UT games during his senior year at defensive end and on special teams. He started eight games, and was an honorable mention All-Big 12 selection by the Associated Press, while helping the UT defense rank sixth nationally in total defense and passing defense. He had 52 tackles (32 solo and ten for a loss), six sacks, and one forced fumble.

For his UT career, Jones appeared in 50 games, logging 111 tackles (71 solo and 24 for a loss), 13.5 sacks, two interceptions, three passes broken up, and two forced fumbles. He also had five special-teams tackles (three solo). While at UT, he graduated with a degree in youth and community studies and began working towards a second degree in physical culture and sport.

== Professional career ==
=== New York Jets ===
After going undrafted in the 2011 NFL draft, Jones was signed by the New York Jets on August 9, 2011. He was waived September 2. Jones was signed to the team's practice squad on September 28. Jones was promoted to the active roster on October 8, 2011, after linebacker Bryan Thomas was placed on injured reserve with a torn Achilles tendon. He was released on October 11 but was re-signed to the practice squad two days later. He was released on October 31.

Jones was re-signed to the practice squad on November 21. He was released on November 28.

=== St. Louis Rams ===
Jones was signed to the St. Louis Rams' practice squad on November 29, 2011. Jones was released two days later to make room for quarterback Tom Brandstater.

=== Second stint with the Jets ===
The Jets signed Jones to a reserve/future contract on January 9, 2012. He was waived on May 22, 2012.

== Coaching career ==
=== Hyde Park Baptist (TAPPS) ===
In 2013, Jones began his coaching career as a Defensive Line Coach at Hyde Park Baptist Football.

=== Blinn Junior College ===
In 2015, Jones was hired as the Linebackers coach at Blinn Junior College. In 2016, Jones was promoted to Defensive Coordinator & Special Teams Coordinator for the Buccaneers. From 2017 - 2019 Jones Served as Co - Defensive Coordinator and Special Teams Coordinator for the Buccaneers.

=== Tarleton State University ===
On February 18, 2019, Jones was hired by Tarleton State as their Defensive Line Coach with duties on Special Teams.

In his debut season at Tarleton, Jones made an immediate impact by coaching a pair of defensive linemen to All-American status. He helped guide the Tarleton defense to its second straight undefeated regular season and Lone Star Conference (LSC) Championship and went to the NCAA Division II playoffs. Under Jones’ leadership, Tarleton defensive lineman B.J. Jefferson was named the LSC Defensive Player of the Year and Jordan Wells was tabbed the LSC Defensive Lineman of the Year. Both went on to earn All-America accolades and Jefferson became the highest finisher in school history in the Gene Upshaw Award list. Jefferson was the national runner-up for the Gene Upshaw award. Jefferson and Wells were both named nominees to for the Cliff Harris Small College Defensive Player of the Year award.

In 2021, when Tarleton State moved up to Division I, Jones became the outside linebackers coach and assisting special teams coach and in 2022 he was the running backs coach.

He left Tarleton State to work as a prison guard in February 2023.
