= Matt Kroul =

American football player (born 1986)

No. 98, 66
- Position: Offensive guard

Personal information
- Born: February 25, 1986 (age 40); Mount Vernon, Iowa, U.S.
- Listed height: 6 ft 3 in (1.91 m)
- Listed weight: 300 lb (136 kg)

Career information
- College: Iowa
- NFL draft: 2009: undrafted

Career history
- New York Jets (2009–2011)

Awards and highlights
- Second-team All-Big Ten (2008)

Career NFL statistics
- Games played: 6
- Stats at Pro Football Reference

Matthew David Kroul (born February 25, 1986) is an American former professional football player who was an offensive guard in the National Football League (NFL). He was signed as an undrafted free agent by the New York Jets in 2009. He played college football for the Iowa Hawkeyes, and high school at Mount Vernon High School.

== Professional career ==
Kroul was signed to the Jets' practice squad on December 30, 2010.

Prior to the 2011 NFL season, the Jets converted Kroul from a defensive lineman to an offensive lineman. He was waived on September 3, 2011. Kroul was signed to the team's practice squad on September 4. He was released on October 25. He was re-signed to the practice squad on October 31. Kroul signed a future/reserve contract with the team on January 3, 2012. On August 31, 2012, he was waived.
