= Chris Bryan =

American football player (born 1982)

Personal information
- Born: 6 March 1982 (age 44) Melbourne, Victoria, Australia
- Height: 198 cm (6 ft 6 in)
- Weight: 97 kg (214 lb)
Australian rules football career
Personal information
- Original team: Frankston (VFL)
- Debut: Round 11, 4 June 2005, Carlton vs. Sydney Swans, at Docklands
- Height: 197 cm (6 ft 6 in)
- Weight: 100 kg (220 lb)
- Position: Ruckman
Playing career^{1}
Years	Club	Games (Goals)
2005–2006	Carlton	16 (9)
2007–2009	Collingwood	30 (10)
Total		46 (19)
- ^{1} Playing statistics correct to the end of 2009.

Sport
- Football career

Profile
- Position: Punter

Career information
- College: Parkdale (VIC) Secondary College

Career history
- Green Bay Packers (2010)*; Tampa Bay Buccaneers (2010); New York Jets (2011)*
- * Offseason or practice squad member only

Career statistics
- Punts: 23
- Punt yards: 860
- Average: 37.4
- Stats at Pro Football Reference

Chris Bryan (born 6 March 1982) is a former sportsman who played both Australian rules football and American football professionally. Bryan played in the Australian Football League (AFL) from 2005 until 2009, and then in the National Football League (NFL) as a punter in 2010 and 2011.

== Australian Football League ==
Bryan is the great-grandson of dual premiership player, Ernie "Snowy" Lumsden, who played 78 games for Collingwood from 1910 to 1920. Bryan's great uncle was Collingwood legend Dick Lee. Bryan unsuccessfully trialled for the Collingwood rookie list in 2000 and spent the next 4 seasons playing in the VFL.

=== Carlton ===
As a mature-aged recruit, Bryan was drafted in the sixth round (no.73 overall) by Carlton in the 2004 AFL draft. Drafted as a 22 years old, Bryan was given a chance after showing enough at VFL level for both Sandringham and Frankston. He made his debut for Carlton in Round 11, 2005 against Sydney and showed an immediate sign he was an aggressive and mobile ruckman, having 20 disposals and 17 hitouts. He played the next 11 games, before being omitted for the last round of 2005. In round 21 he amazingly had zero disposals, but managed a career high 20 hitouts.

Bryan struggled in the 2006 season, as Dylan McLaren was recruited to fill the secondary ruck position behind Barnaby French. Bryan played only five games, all towards the end of the season, was dropped to the VFL reserves for the finals. Bryan was delisted by Carlton after two seasons.

During his time at Carlton, Bryan was noted for his long, left-foot kicking, and he often assumed responsibility for kick-ins. In response to this, Carlton fans would always chant "woof!" whenever Bryan kicked the ball; Bryan was the third Carlton player to receive the traditional chant, after Val Perovic in the 1980s and Ang Christou in the 1990s.

=== Collingwood ===
In 2007, Bryan nominated for the pre-season draft, and was selected by Collingwood with their 8th pick. Bryan made his debut for the Magpies in Collingwood's annual clash against Essendon on Anzac Day. A week later he played his best game in his short career, having 15 touches, 9 marks and kicking 3 goals at AAMI Stadium against Adelaide.

Bryan was called up for an injured Josh Fraser in a semi-final against West Coast in Perth, a famous game that saw Bryan kick a vital goal in extra time. Bryan played the following game in the preliminary final, 5-point loss, against eventual 2007 premiers Geelong. Bryan managed 12 games in his first season with his new club.

In 2008, Bryan played a further 17 games, including an elimination final against Adelaide and a semi-final against St Kilda. Bryan played in round one of the 2009 season, his last game at AFL level. Bryan played the remainder of 2009 in the VFL and was de-listed by the Magpies at the conclusion of the season.

In late October, Bryan was invited to train with Hawthorn in the hope that he might be drafted by the club who at the time were in need of a ruck. However, Bryan was not drafted.

== Statistics ==
Legend
G	Goals	K	Kicks	D	Disposals	T	Tackles
B	Behinds	H	Handballs	M	Marks

Season	Team	No.	Games	Totals							Averages (per game)						
Season	Team	No.	Games	G	B	K	H	D	M	T	G	B	K	H	D	M	T
2005	Carlton	27	11	6	1	74	22	96	34	30	0.55	0.09	6.73	2.00	8.73	3.09	2.73
2006	Carlton	27	5	3	1	25	18	43	22	8	0.60	0.20	5.00	3.60	8.60	4.40	1.60
2007	Collingwood	40	12	6	7	74	23	97	40	34	0.50	0.58	6.17	1.92	8.08	3.33	2.83
2008	Collingwood	40	17	4	1	114	56	170	65	34	0.24	0.06	6.71	3.29	10.00	3.82	2.00
2009	Collingwood	40	1	0	0	4	2	6	6	2	–	–	4.00	2.00	6.00	1.00	2.00
Career			46	19	10	291	121	412	162	108	0.41	0.22	6.33	2.63	8.96	3.52	2.35

== National Football League ==
=== Green Bay Packers ===
In February 2010, after training with Nathan Chapman and John Smith of ProKick Australia, it was revealed Bryan was close to signing a deal with one of a number of NFL teams in the United States as a punter. On 16 March, Bryan was signed to a three-year contract by the Green Bay Packers. After participating in the Green Bay rookie mini-camp, OTA's (Organised team activities) and the pre-season, Bryan was released by the team on 4 September.

=== Tampa Bay Buccaneers ===
On 6 September 2010, the Tampa Bay Buccaneers signed Bryan to a three-year contract and waived rookie punter Brent Bowden. On 12 September, Bryan played his first regular-season NFL game against the Cleveland Browns at Raymond James Stadium, in Tampa, Florida. The next day, he was waived by the Buccaneers and replaced by Robert Malone.

=== New York Jets ===
On 29 July 2011, Bryan was signed by the New York Jets on 29 July 2011 to compete with incumbent T. J. Conley. He was waived on 30 August.

== Post-career ==
Bryan returned to Melbourne and to Australian rules football in 2012, and was signed as senior playing coach of the Keysborough Football Club, where he had played his junior football, in the Casey-Cardinia division of the Mornington Peninsula Nepean Football League for the 2013 and 2014 seasons. He switched to the Peninsula Division's Bonbeach Football Club as a playing assistant coach in 2015.
