= Colin Baxter =

American football player (born 1987)

No. 64
- Position: Center

Personal information
- Born: July 31, 1987 (age 39); Rolling Hills, California, U.S.
- Listed height: 6 ft 3 in (1.91 m)
- Listed weight: 310 lb (141 kg)

Career information
- High school: Palos Verdes Peninsula (Rolling Hills Estates, California)
- College: Arizona
- NFL draft: 2011: undrafted

Career history
- San Diego Chargers (2011)*; New York Jets (2011); San Diego Chargers (2011−2012); Los Angeles Kiss (2014)
- * Offseason or practice squad member only

Awards and highlights
- 2× Second-team All-Pac-10 (2009, 2010)

Career NFL statistics
- Games played: 12
- Games started: 2
- Stats at Pro Football Reference

Colin Baxter (born July 31, 1987) is an American former professional football player who was a center in the National Football League (NFL). He played college football for the Arizona Wildcats and was signed as an undrafted free agent by the San Diego Chargers in 2011. He was also a member of the New York Jets.

== Early life ==
A native of Rolling Hills, California, Baxter attended Palos Verdes Peninsula High School, where he played lineman on both sides of the ball, and was the 2005 CIF Division III Defensive Player of the Year. Regarded as a three-star recruit by Rivals.com, Baxter was listed as the No. 25 offensive guard prospect in the class of 2006. He was Arizona's first commitment in Class of 2006, pledging in June 2005.

== College career ==
Baxter finished his senior season at Arizona with 50 appearances and 49 consecutive starts (first 11 at left guard, before switching to center). He was Rimington Trophy candidate in 2009 and earned an All-Pac-10 Second-team selection two years in a row. Finalist for the 2010 Rimington Trophy and also nominated for the 2010 Outland Trophy.

Baxter was considered one of the best center prospect in his class.

== Professional career ==
=== San Diego Chargers ===
After going undrafted in the 2011 NFL draft, Baxter was signed by the San Diego Chargers on July 26, 2011. He was waived on September 3.

=== New York Jets ===
Baxter was claimed off waivers by the New York Jets on September 4, 2011. Baxter made his professional debut on September 18, 2011 after Nick Mangold left the game due to an ankle injury. Baxter performed well in his debut during a 31-3 win against the Jacksonville Jaguars. After Mangold went on the disabled list due to a high ankle sprain, Baxter was named the new starting center for the Jets. In Week 4 vs. the Baltimore Ravens, Baxter was pulled from the game due to struggles and was replaced by Matt Slauson. The Jets designated Baxter for assignment after Mangold was activated and waived Baxter on October 25, 2011.

=== Second stint with the Chargers ===
Baxter elected to re-sign to San Diego's practice squad on October 26, 2011 despite the Jets' expressed interest in re-signing him to their squad. On August 25, 2013, he was cut by the Chargers.

=== Los Angeles Kiss ===
Baxter was assigned to the Los Angeles Kiss of the Arena Football League on January 14, 2014. He was reassigned on June 2, 2014.
