= Nick Mangold =

American football player (1984–2025)

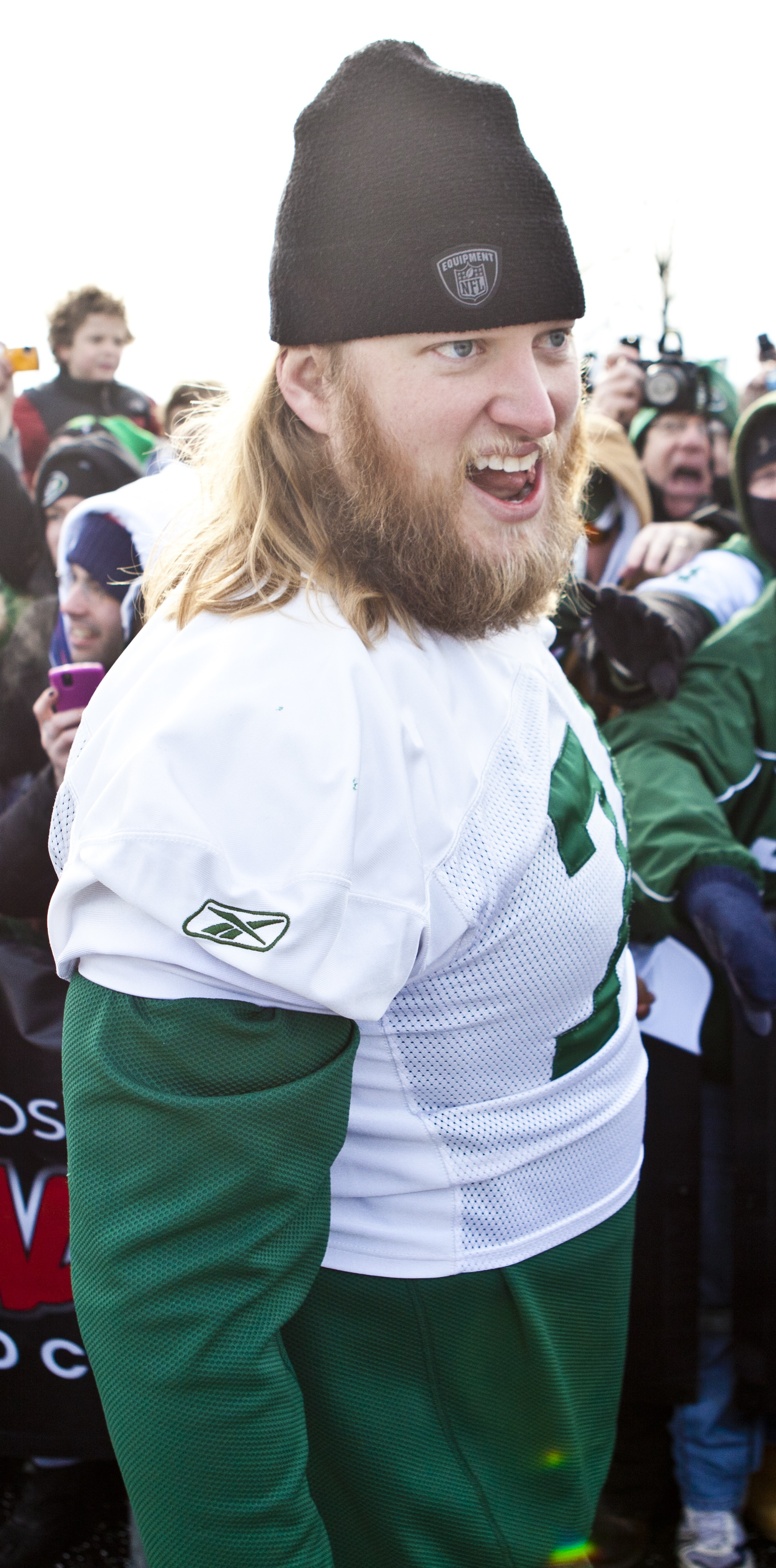
- Mangold in 2011

No. 74
- Position: Center

Personal information
- Born: January 13, 1984; Centerville, Ohio, U.S.
- Died: October 25, 2025 (aged 41); Madison, New Jersey, U.S.
- Listed height: 6 ft 4 in (1.93 m)
- Listed weight: 307 lb (139 kg)

Career information
- High school: Archbishop Alter (Kettering, Ohio)
- College: Ohio State (2002–2005)
- NFL draft: 2006: 1st round, 29th overall pick

Career history
- New York Jets (2006–2016)

Awards and highlights
- 2× First-team All-Pro (2009, 2010); Second-team All-Pro (2011); 7× Pro Bowl (2008–2011, 2013–2015); PFWA All-Rookie Team (2006); New York Jets Ring of Honor; National champion (2002); First-team All-American (2005); Second-team All-Big Ten (2005)

Career NFL statistics
- Games played: 164
- Games started: 164
- Stats at Pro Football Reference

Nicholas Allan Mangold (January 13, 1984 – October 25, 2025) was an American professional football player who spent his entire 11-season career as a center with the New York Jets of the National Football League (NFL). He played college football for the Ohio State Buckeyes and was selected by the Jets in the first round of the 2006 NFL draft.

== Early life ==
Mangold was born on January 13, 1984. He was raised in Centerville, Ohio, and attended Archbishop Alter High School in Kettering, where he was a letterman in football, wrestling and track and field. In football, he was a three-year starter on both offense and defense; as a senior, he garnered All-Ohio honors. He also earned three letters in wrestling and two in track and field, competing in the shot put.

Mangold was not ranked by recruiting services such as Rivals.com and Scout.com, but he played in the 2002 U.S. Army All-American Bowl.

== College career ==
Mangold attended Ohio State University and was a three-year starter at center for the Ohio State Buckeyes football team. He was rated on par with former Buckeye All-American and 2001 Rimington Trophy winner LeCharles Bentley by offensive line coach Jim Bollman, who said: "Most guys you get out of high school have to be taught to play center. He already knew the mechanics of the position. That was a big, big advantage." Mangold was known for his durability and logged more than 300 minutes of action in several seasons.

In his true freshman year, Mangold appeared in eight games as the backup for Alex Stepanovich, who later played in the NFL. In 2003, Stepanovich suffered a knee injury in the second game of the season against the San Diego State Aztecs. Mangold entered the game and started the final 11 games of the season. When Stepanovich returned, he shifted to playing guard and Mangold continued to play the center position.

He earned All-Big Ten Conference Honorable Mention honors in 2004, when the coaching staff named Mangold Offensive Lineman of the Week seven times and Offensive Player of the Week against the Northwestern Wildcats. Mangold was again chosen second-team All-Big Ten in 2005. He finished his career with 33 starts in 45 games.

== Professional career ==
After a "tremendous performance" at the 2006 Senior Bowl, Mangold was widely regarded as the top center available in the 2006 NFL draft, ahead of 2005 Outland Trophy and Rimington Trophy winner Greg Eslinger.

Pre-draft measurables
Height	Weight	Arm length	Hand span	40-yard dash	10-yard split	20-yard split	20-yard shuttle	Three-cone drill	Vertical jump	Broad jump	Bench press	Wonderlic
6 ft 3 5/8 in (1.92 m)	300 lb (136 kg)	31 7/8 in (0.81 m)	10 3/8 in (0.26 m)	5.05 s	1.74 s	2.90 s	4.36 s	7.47 s	27.5 in (0.70 m)	8 ft 8 in (2.64 m)	24 reps	35
All values from NFL Combine

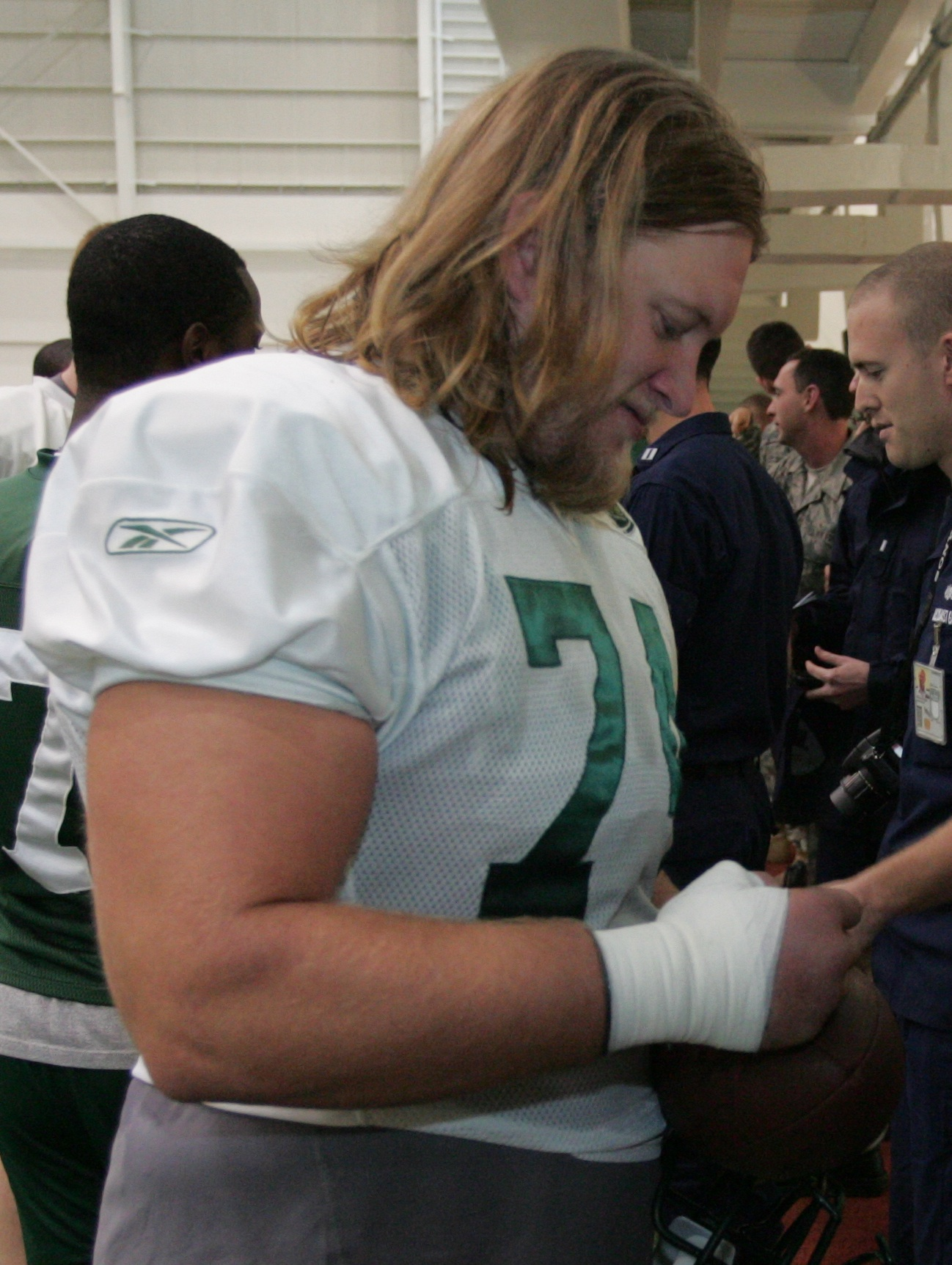
Mangold signing autographs during the Jets 2009 training camp

The New York Jets selected Mangold in the first round (29th overall); they had just used their No. 1 pick on offensive tackle D'Brickashaw Ferguson in an effort to rebuild their offensive line. The Jets originally acquired the pick from the Atlanta Falcons in a trade for John Abraham. It marked the first instance of a team drafting two offensive linemen in the first round after the 1975 NFL draft, when the Los Angeles Rams took Dennis Harrah and Doug France.

Replacing Kevin Mawae at center, Mangold started all 16 games his rookie season, allowing only 0.5 sacks, committing only three penalties and making all of the line calls. He garnered some Rookie of the Year consideration at a position that does not normally receive as much attention as skill-position players. From 2007 through 2010, Mangold started all 16 games in each season. The Jets reached the playoffs twice during the span in the 2009 and 2010 seasons, but lost to the Indianapolis Colts and Pittsburgh Steelers in two AFC Championship Games respectively.

Mangold was a Pro Bowl selection in 2008 and 2009, and was part of an offensive line that started the same players for 32 games, the longest active streak among NFL offensive lines at the time, which is regarded as one of the league's best in run blocking to date. In 2010, Mangold wanted to restructure his contract with the team; however, he became disappointed with the pace of the contract talks. On August 24, 2010, Mangold signed a seven-year, $55 million contract with $22.5 million guaranteed, becoming the highest-paid center in the NFL, The record has been surpassed by Ryan Kalil and Alex Mack. Mangold was ranked 47th by his fellow players for the NFL Top 100 Players of 2011.

During Week 2 of the 2011 season against the Jacksonville Jaguars, Mangold left the game with a high-ankle sprain. Undrafted rookie Colin Baxter played center in Mangold's absence for the next two games. Mangold returned for Week 5 against the New England Patriots. He finished the 2011 season by starting 14 games and was named a Pro Bowl selection for the fourth time.

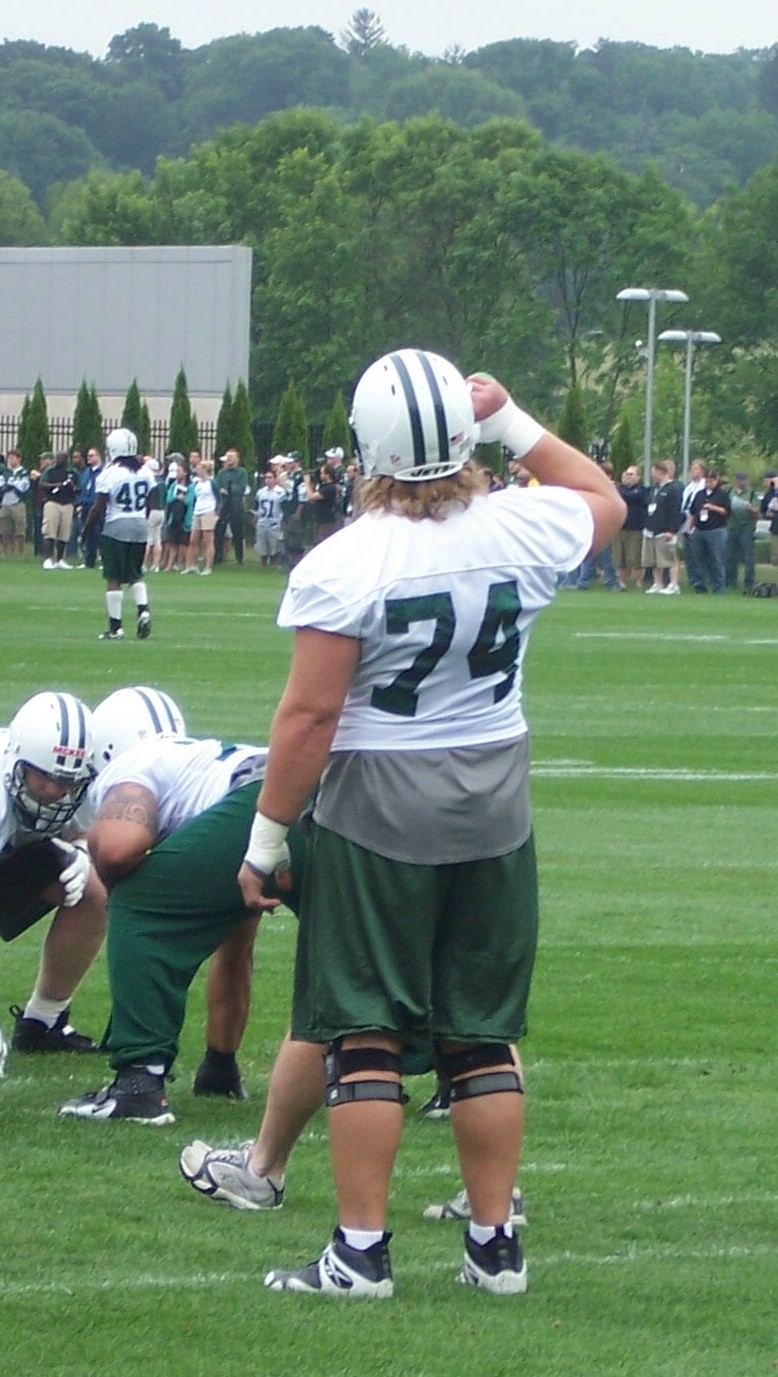
Mangold watching second-teamers work out at a Jets mini-camp, June 2009

In 2012, Mangold started all 16 games but was not named to the Pro Bowl, ending his four-year streak. In 2013, Mangold again started all 16 games and was named to the fifth Pro Bowl of his career. Mangold started 15 games in both the 2014 and 2015 seasons, and was named a Pro Bowl selection in both years, bringing his Pro Bowl selection total to seven. In Week 7 of the 2016 season, Mangold injured his ankle and missed the next four games. He returned in Week 13 against the Colts before reinjuring his ankle. He was placed on injured reserve on December 8, 2016, ending his season.

On February 25, 2017, Mangold was released by the Jets after 11 seasons with the team. The team had experienced a poor season and was entering a rebuilding mode.

On April 17, 2018, after spending the entire 2017 season away from football, Mangold announced his retirement. He signed a one-day contract on April 24, 2018 to officially retire as a member of the Jets.

== Legacy ==
On September 25, 2022, during a halftime ceremony at MetLife Stadium, Mangold was inducted into the New York Jets' Ring of Honor.

== Personal life and death ==
Mangold was born to Vernon and Therese Mangold. He was the oldest of four children and had three sisters: Kelley, Holley (an Olympic weightlifter) and Maggey.

He hailed from the same hometown as did fellow Ohio State alumni Mike Nugent and A. J. Hawk. Mangold and Nugent were later teammates with the New York Jets.

Mangold married Jennifer Richmond, his high-school sweetheart, in April 2007, and the couple had four children. The family lived in Chatham, New Jersey, during his playing days and moved to Madison, New Jersey, after his retirement from the NFL, where he coached youth football. Mangold participated in various charitable events throughout his career. He appeared on the Wrap Up Show on Howard 100 after the broadcast of The Howard Stern Show on April 30, 2009. He campaigned with Republican presidential candidate Mitt Romney in 2012. He appeared virtually on the January 22, 2021 episode of the television game show Let's Make a Deal.

On October 14, 2025, Mangold appealed publicly on social media for a kidney donation, revealing that he had been suffering from chronic kidney disease since 2006. However, he died from kidney-disease complications on October 25 at the age of 41.
