= Tracy Wilson (American football) =

American football player (born 1989)

No. 9, 37, 35
- Position: Safety

Personal information
- Born: February 27, 1989 (age 37); Harvey, Illinois, U.S.
- Listed height: 6 ft 2 in (1.88 m)
- Listed weight: 203 lb (92 kg)

Career information
- High school: Chicago (IL) St. Francis de Sales
- College: Northern Illinois
- NFL draft: 2011: undrafted

Career history
- New York Jets (2011); Tennessee Titans (2012); Columbus Lions (2016)

Awards and highlights
- AIF champion (2016)

Career NFL statistics
- Total tackles: 9
- Stats at Pro Football Reference

Tracy Wilson (born February 27, 1989) is an American former professional football player who was a safety in the National Football League (NFL). He was signed by the New York Jets as an undrafted free agent in 2011. He attended St. Francis de Sales High School in Chicago, Illinois where he graduated in 2007. He played college football for the Northern Illinois Huskies.

== Professional career ==
=== New York Jets ===
Wilson was made eligible for the NFL supplemental draft but he went undrafted. He was signed by the New York Jets on August 24, 2011. Wilson was released on September 3 as part of the final roster cuts prior to the beginning of the season. He was signed to the team's practice squad on October 12. He was promoted to the active roster on November 29. Wilson made his NFL debut on December 4 against the Washington Redskins.

Wilson was waived by the team on August 1, 2012.

=== Tennessee Titans ===
On August 8, 2012, Wilson signed with the Tennessee Titans. On October 31, 2012, Wilson was waived by the Tennessee Titans

On November 3, 2012, he was re-signed by the Titans. On August 26, 2013, he was waived by the Titans.

=== Columbus Lions ===
In 2016, Wilson signed with the Columbus Lions.
