= T. J. Conley =

American football player (born 1985)

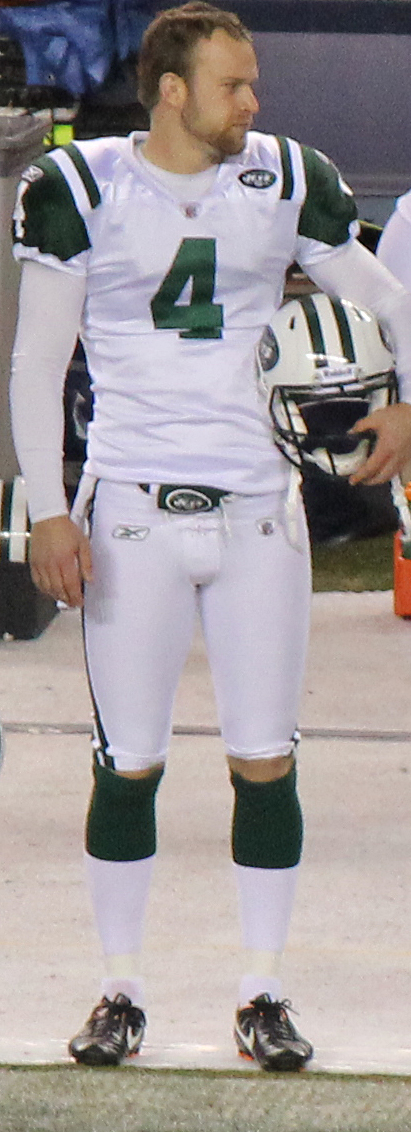
- Conley on the sidelines in 2011.

No. 4
- Position: Punter

Personal information
- Born: August 29, 1985 (age 41); Tacoma, Washington, U.S.
- Listed height: 6 ft 3 in (1.91 m)
- Listed weight: 212 lb (96 kg)

Career information
- College: Idaho
- NFL draft: 2009: undrafted

Career history
- New York Jets (2009–2011); Minnesota Vikings (2013)*; Cleveland Browns (2013)*; Cincinnati Bengals (2014)*
- * Offseason or practice squad member only

Awards and highlights
- First-team All-American (2008)

Career NFL statistics
- Punts: 92
- Punt yards: 3,926
- Punting yard average: 42.7
- Stats at Pro Football Reference

Timothy Joseph Conley Jr. (born August 29, 1985) is an American former professional football player who was a punter in the National Football League (NFL). He played college football for the Idaho Vandals and was signed as an undrafted free agent by the New York Jets in 2009.

== Professional career ==
=== New York Jets ===
Conley was signed to a future contract on January 7, 2011. Conley competed with punter Chris Bryan to determine the eventual replacement for former incumbent Steve Weatherford. Conley was named the starter heading into the 2011 season on August 30, 2011. Conley was waived on September 4, 2012.

=== Minnesota Vikings ===
Conley signed with the Minnesota Vikings on January 9, 2013. He was released on April 29, 2013.

=== Cleveland Browns ===
Conley signed with the Cleveland Browns on May 14, 2013. He was waived on August 22, 2013.

=== Cincinnati Bengals ===
On April 16, 2014, Conley signed with the Cincinnati Bengals.

== Personal life ==
Conley was born to Laurie and Timothy Conley. Conley married his fiancée Tassie Souhrada in 2010. The couple has a son, Brayden Patrick Conley, and a daughter, McKenzie Claire Conley. He now works as a coach at Eastern Washington University in Cheney, Washington.
