= List of people from North Carolina =

State flag of North Carolina

Location of North Carolina in the United States

The following is a list of notable people who were born, raised, or closely associated with the U.S. state of North Carolina.

== Academia ==
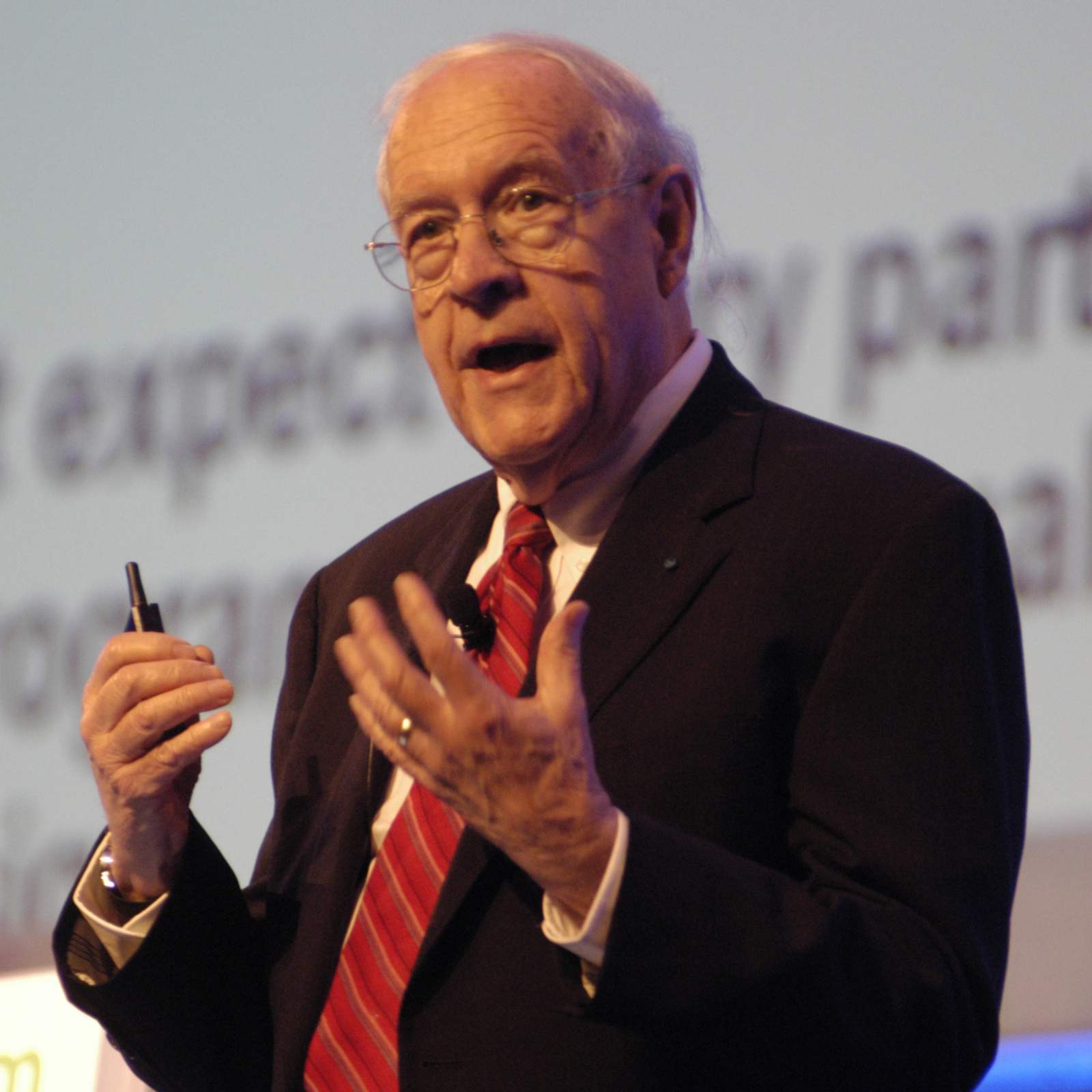
Fred Brooks

- Graham Allison (born 1940), political scientist and professor at the John F. Kennedy School of Government at Harvard University (Charlotte)
- Dorothy Hansine Andersen (1901–1963), pathologist and pediatrician, first physician to identify cystic fibrosis as a disease (Asheville)
- Joseph Penn Breedlove (1874–1955), Duke University librarian 1898–1946 (Durham)
- Fred Brooks (born 1931), computer architect, software engineer, and computer scientist (Durham)
- Carrie Lougee Broughton (1879–1957), librarian and first female State Librarian (Raleigh)
- John Chavis (1763–1838), African-American educator and theologian (Oxford)
- Anna J. Cooper (1858–1964), prominent African-American scholar, author, sociologist, and educator (Raleigh)
- Elson Floyd (1956–2015), 10th president of Washington State University, former president of University of Missouri System and of Western Michigan University (Henderson)
- Phillip Griffiths (born 1938), mathematician, known for work in the field of geometry (Raleigh)
- Jay U. Gunter (1911–1994), pathologist and amateur astronomer (Sanford)
- John Kuykendall (born 1938), served as 15th president of Davidson College (Charlotte)
- Daniel McFadden (born 1937), economist, winner of 2000 Nobel Prize in economics (Raleigh)
- Elizabeth A. McMahan (1924–2009), professor, entomologist, psychologist, cartoonist, writer, traveler (Pino)
- Kary Mullis (1944–2019), biochemist, inventor of polymerase chain reaction (PCR) technique (Lenoir)
- James E. Shepard (1875–1947), pharmacist, civil servant and educator, founder of what became North Carolina Central University (Raleigh)
- Thomas Sowell (born 1930), economist, social critic, political commentator, and author (Gastonia)
- Martin Wohl (1930–2009), transportation economist and professor (Greensboro)
- Anne D. Yoder, biologist, researcher, and professor in the Department of Biology at Duke University (Charlotte)

== Artists ==
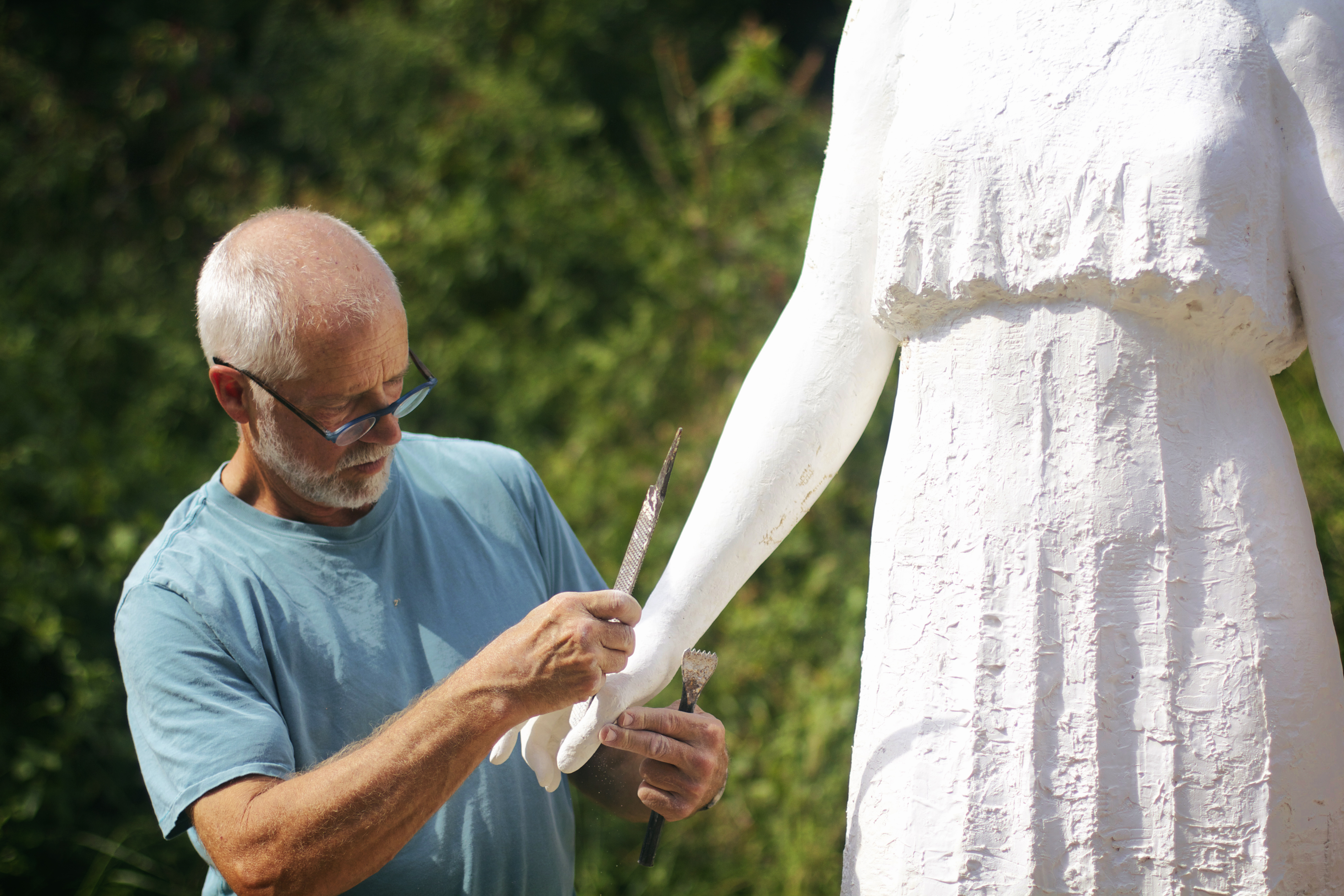
James Barnhill

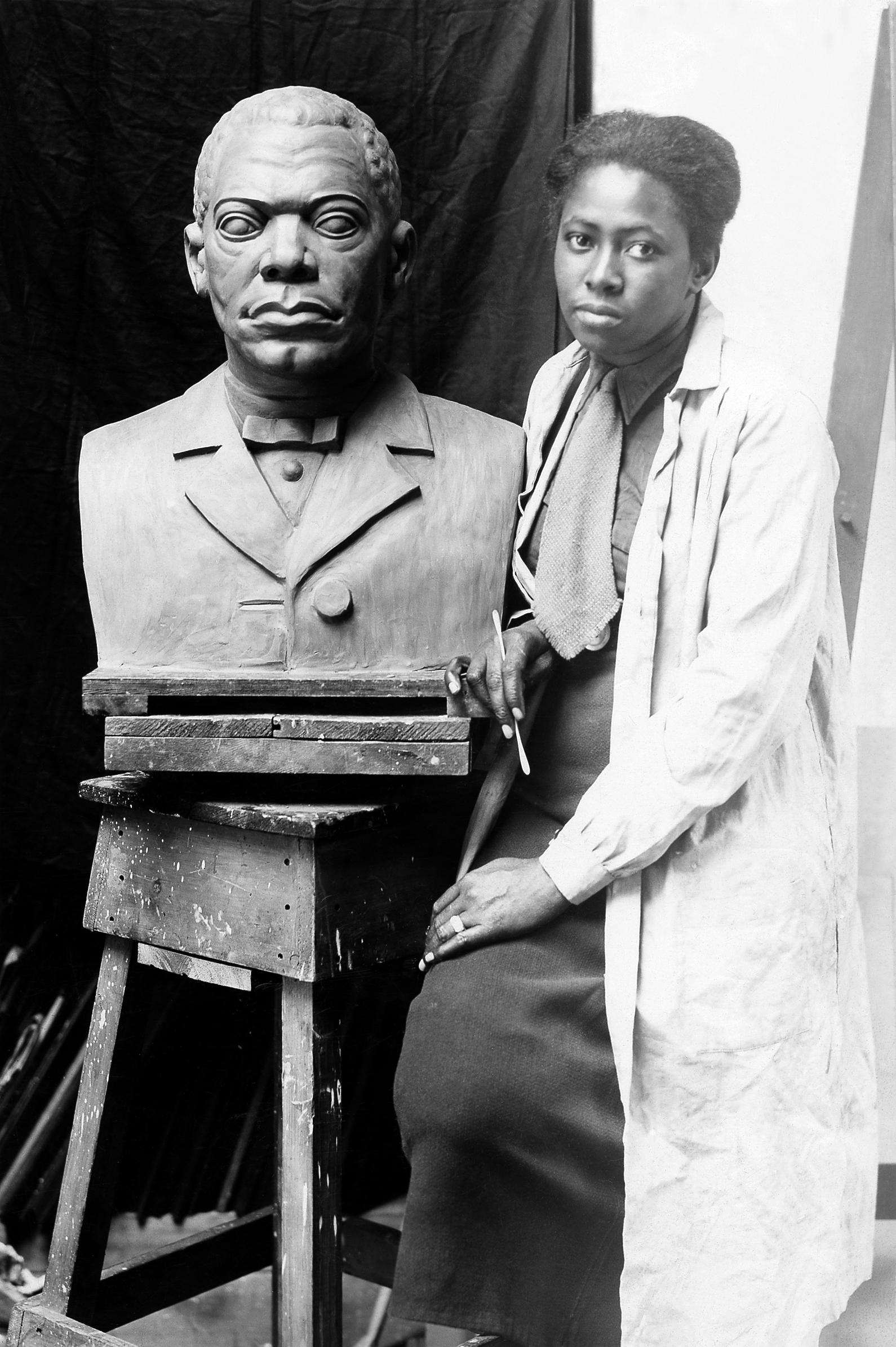
Selma Burke

- Charles Alston (1907–1977), painter, illustrator, muralist, and sculptor (Charlotte)
- Murphy Anderson (1926–2015), comics artist (Asheville)
- Ernie Barnes (1938–2009), Neo-Mannerist artist and former professional football player (Durham)
- James Barnhill (born 1955), sculptor (Asheville)
- Romare Bearden (1911–1988), artist (Charlotte)
- John T. Biggers (1924–2001), painter and muralist (Gastonia)
- Elizabeth Bradford (born 1950), painter (Huntersville)
- Selma Burke (1900–1995), sculptor and ceramicist (Mooresville)
- Amanda Crowe (1928–2004), woodcarver (Cherokee)
- Minnie Evans (1892–1987), folk artist (Pender County)
- Herb Jackson (born 1945), painter, given North Carolina Award by governor in 1999 (Raleigh)
- John Littleton (born 1957), glass artist with collaborative partner Kate Vogel, based in (Bakersville)
- Beverly McIver (born 1962), contemporary artist, mostly known for self-portraits (Greensboro)
- Kenneth Noland (1924–2010), painter (Asheville)
- Mabel Pugh (1891–1986), painter (Morrisville)
- Isaiah Rice (1917–1980), photographer (Asheville)
- Bob Timberlake (born 1937), realist artist, known for watercolor paintings and home furnishings (Lexington)
- Kate Vogel (born 1956), glass artist with collaborative partner John Littleton, based in (Bakersville)

== Business ==
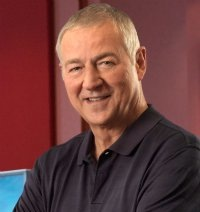
James Goodnight

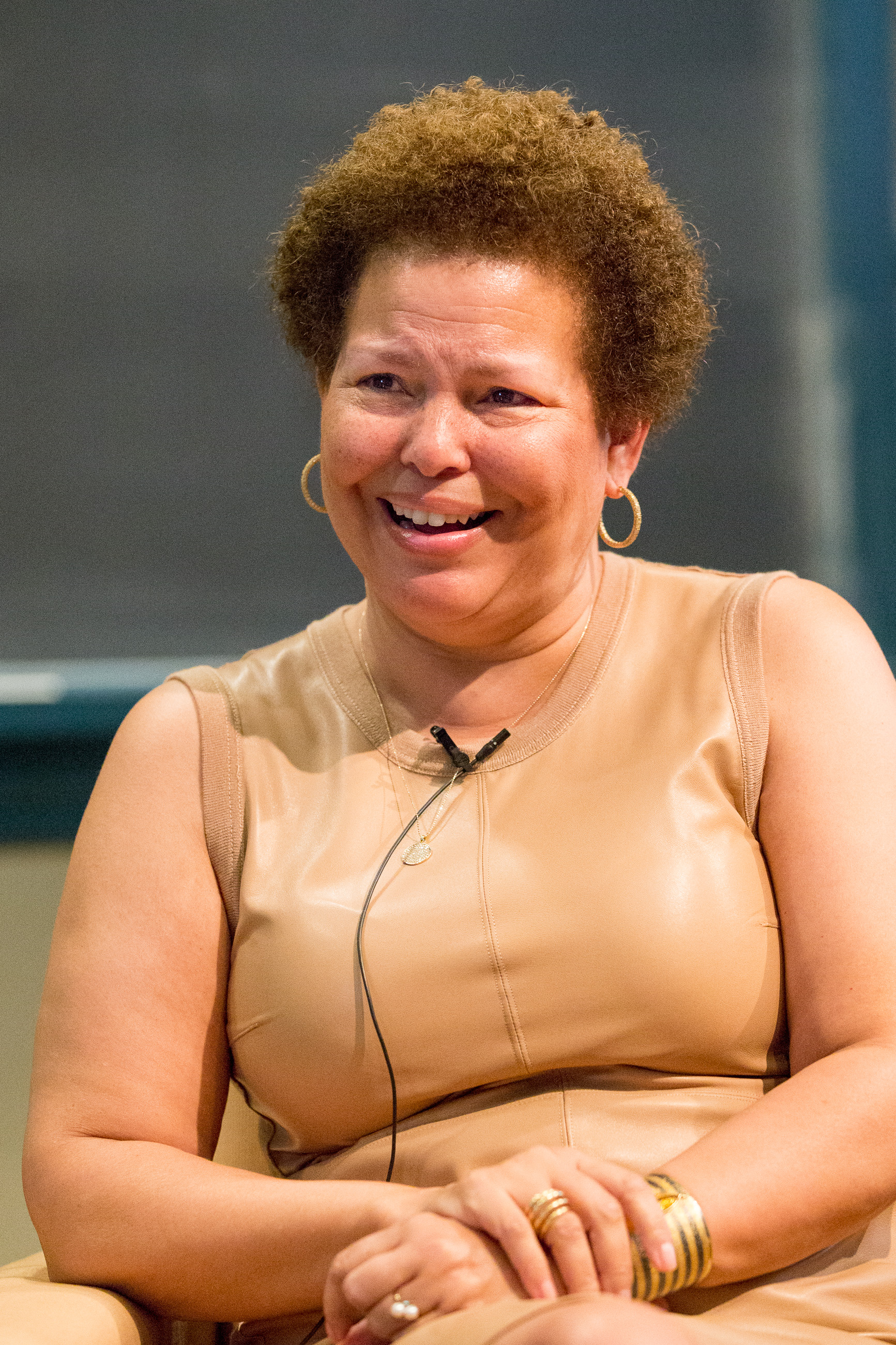
Debra L. Lee

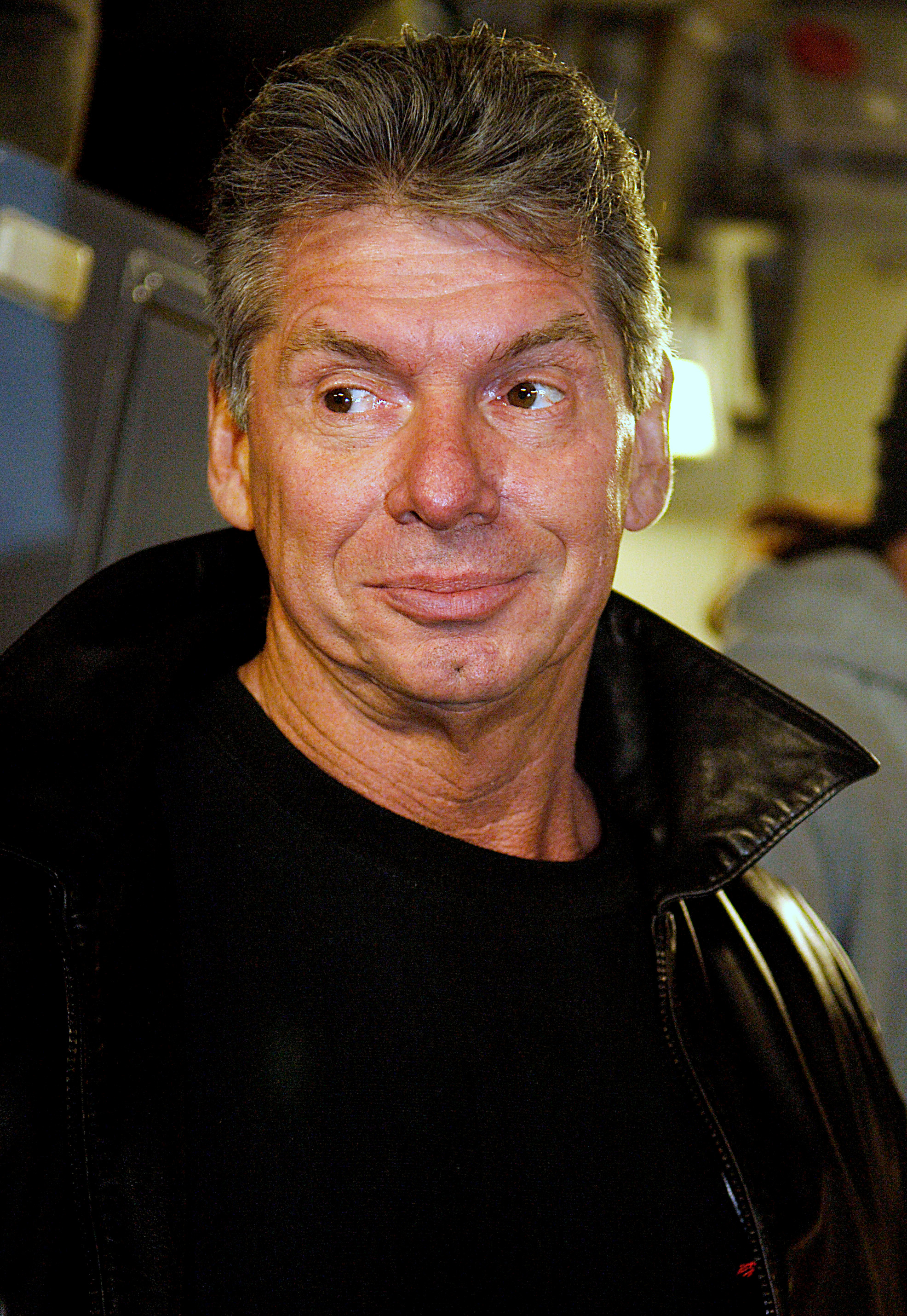
Vince McMahon

- Louis Bacon (born 1956), hedge fund manager, trader and founder of Moore Capital Management (Raleigh)
- Maria Beasley (1836–1913), entrepreneur and inventor
- Caleb Bradham (1866–1934), inventor of Pepsi-Cola (New Bern)
- James Edgar Broyhill (1892–1988), industrialist, founder of Broyhill Furniture Industries, Inc. (Wilkes County)
- Charles Albert Cannon (1892–1971), textile executive, president of Cannon Mills (Concord)
- Benjamin Newton Duke (1855–1929), tobacco and electric power industrialist, co-founder of Duke Energy (Durham)
- James Buchanan Duke (1856–1925), tobacco and electric power industrialist, founder of American Tobacco Company, co-founder of Duke Energy (Durham)
- Richard Jordan Gatling (1818–1903), inventor of the Gatling gun (Hertford County)
- James Goodnight (born 1943), software developer, CEO of SAS Institute (Wilmington)
- William B. Harrison Jr. (born 1943), former CEO of JPMorgan Chase (Rocky Mount)
- E. Lee Hennessee (1952–2016), pioneer hedge fund manager (Raleigh)
- Chris Hughes (born 1983), co-founder of Facebook (Hickory)
- Richard Jenrette (1929–2018), co-founder of investment bank Donaldson, Lufkin & Jenrette (Raleigh)
- Ralph Ketner (1920–2016), founder of Food Lion (Salisbury)
- Kelly King (born 1948), chairman and CEO of BB&T (Raleigh)
- Herman Lay (1909–1982), businessman, founder of Lay's potato chips (Charlotte)
- Debra L. Lee (born 1954), CEO of BET (Greensboro)
- Leon Levine (born 1937), businessman and philanthropist, founder of Family Dollar (Wadesboro)
- Ann Livermore (born 1958), former executive vice president at Hewlett-Packard (Greensboro)
- Vince McMahon (born 1945), chairman of World Wrestling Entertainment (WWE) (Pinehurst)
- Dalton L. McMichael (1914–2001), textile executive (Wentworth)
- John Merrick (1859–1919), businessman, founder of North Carolina Mutual Life Insurance Company (Clinton)
- Ricky Moore, chef and restaurant owner
- James Owens (born 1946), former chairman and CEO of Caterpillar Inc. (Elizabeth City)
- Ronald Perelman (born 1943), businessman, investor, CEO of MacAndrews & Forbes (Greensboro)
- John Henry Phelan (1877–1957), oil producer and philanthropist (Charlotte)
- R. J. Reynolds (1850–1918), founder of R. J. Reynolds Tobacco Company (Winston-Salem)
- Julian Robertson (born 1932), hedge fund manager (Salisbury)
- Charles Clinton Spaulding (1874–1952), served as president of NC Mutual Life Insurance Company (Columbus County)
- Stanley Tanger (1923–2010), founder of Tanger Factory Outlet Centers (Greensboro)
- David S. Taylor (born 1958), chairman and CEO of Procter & Gamble (Charlotte)

== Entertainers ==
A–L

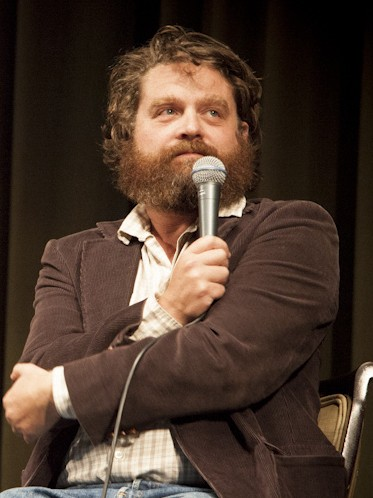
Zach Galifianakis

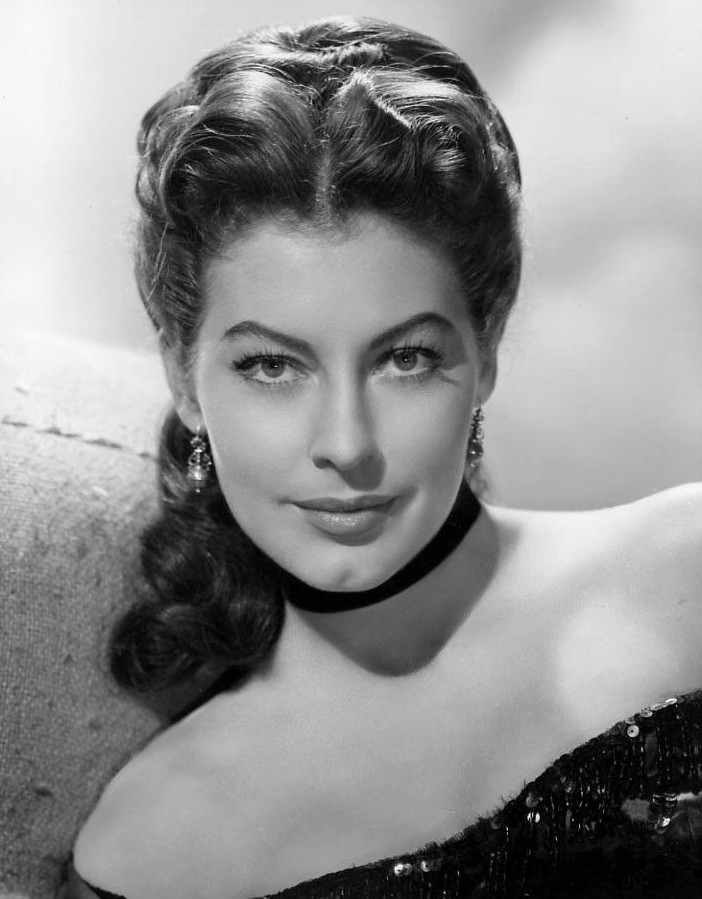
Ava Gardner

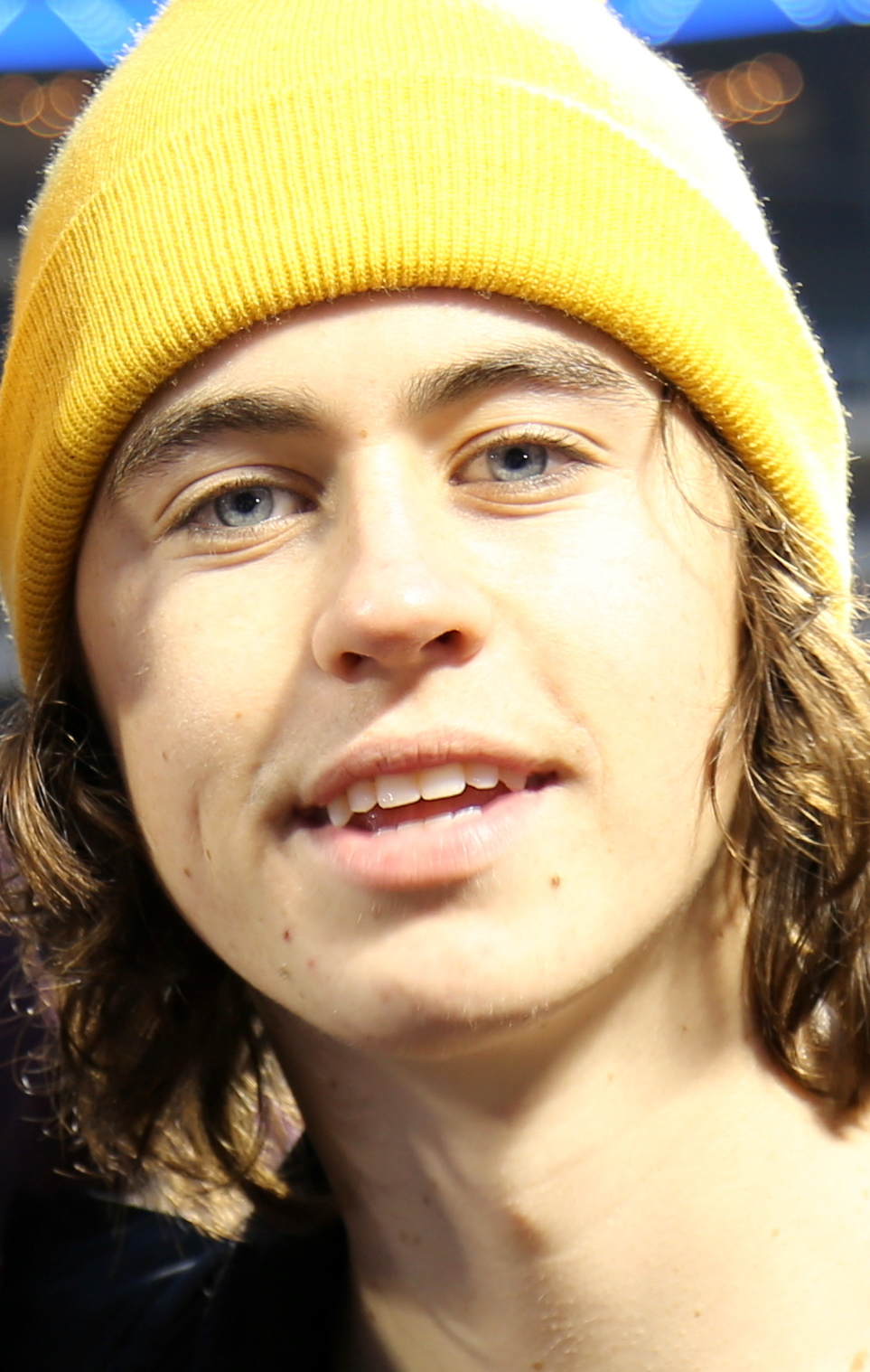
Nash Grier

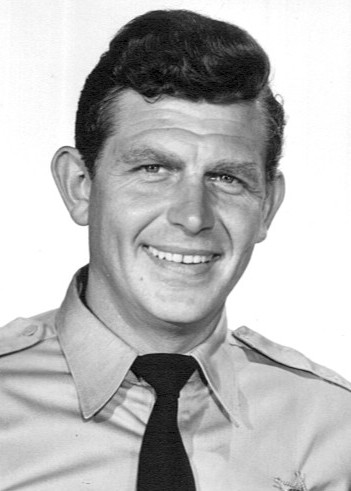
Andy Griffith

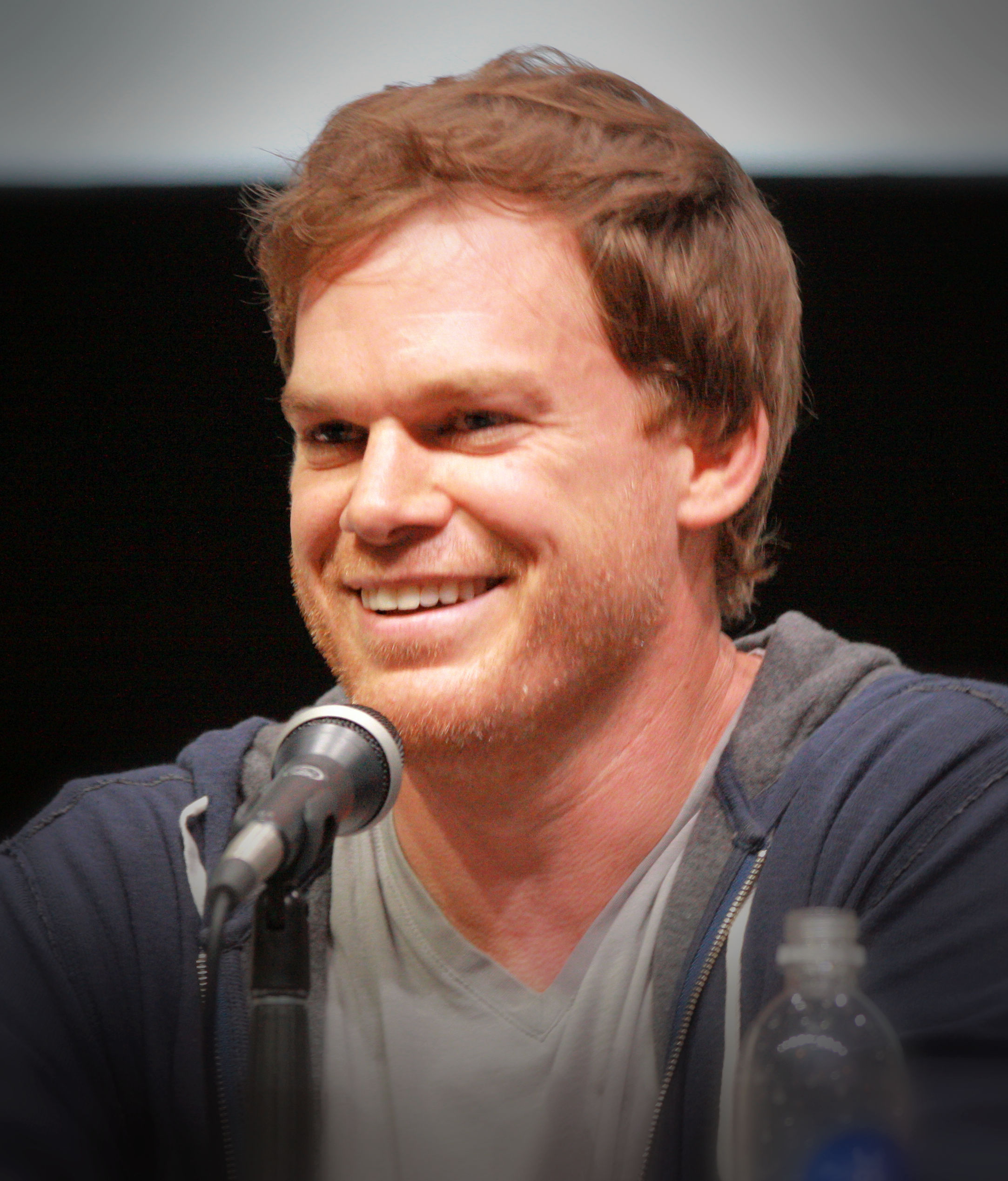
Michael C. Hall

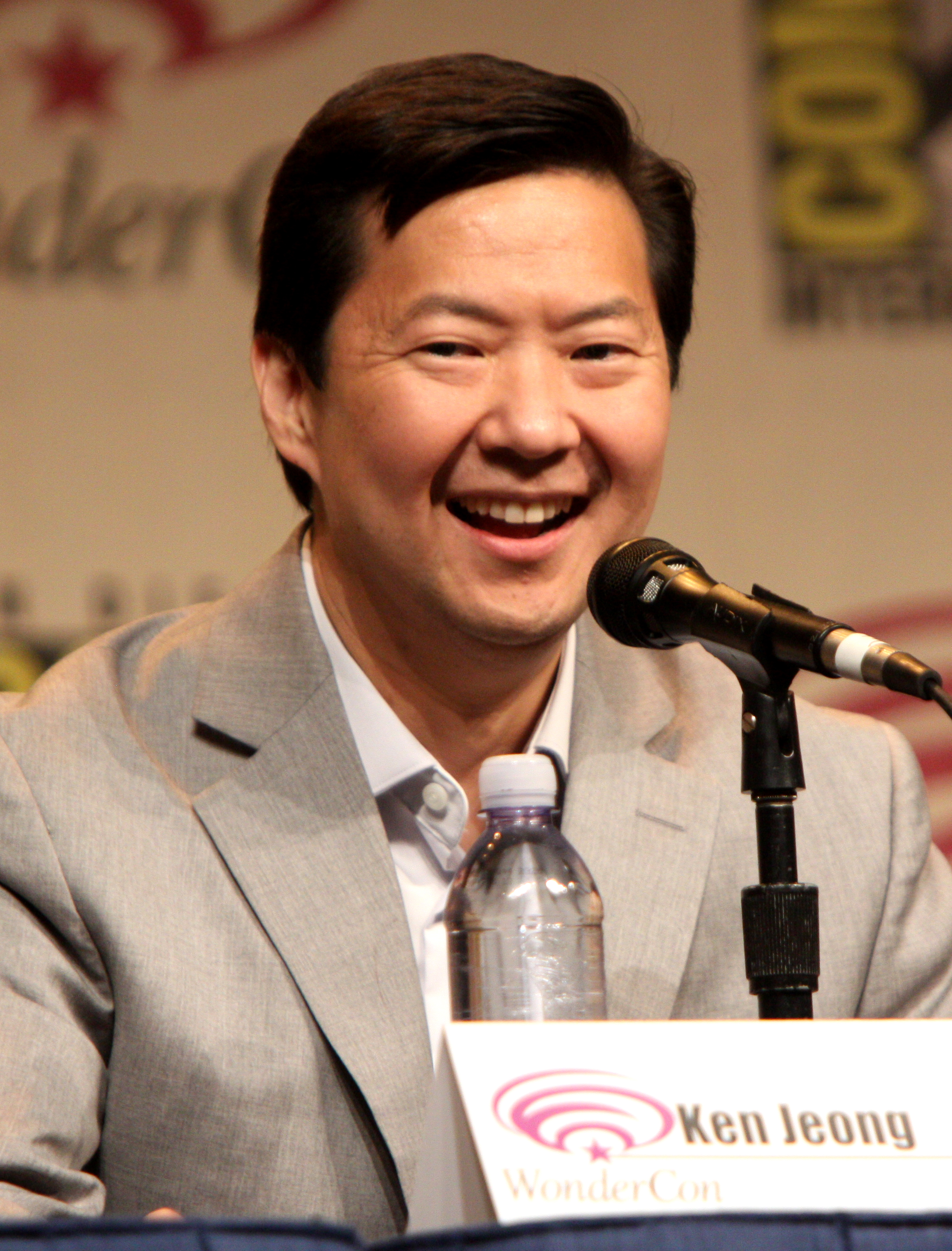
Ken Jeong

- Sidney Blackmer (1895–1973), actor (Salisbury)
- Randy Boone (born 1942), actor and singer (Fayetteville)
- Alicia Bridges (born 1953), singer-songwriter ("I Love the Nightlife") (Charlotte)
- Doug Brochu (born 1990), actor (Fayetteville)
- Ben Browder (born 1962), actor (Charlotte)
- Darby Camp (born 2007), actress (Charlotte)
- Cliff Cash (born 1981), stand-up comedian (Gastonia)
- Jim David, stand-up comedian, actor (Asheville)
- Cecil B. DeMille (1881–1959), film director and producer (Washington)
- Tom DiCillo (born 1953), film director (Camp Le Jeune)
- Jimmy Donaldson (born 1998), better known online as MrBeast; YouTuber, entrepreneur, and philanthropist (Greenville)
- Jennifer Ehle (born 1969), actress (Winston-Salem)
- Mike Evans (1949–2006), actor (Salisbury)
- Fortune Feimster (born 1980), comedian, actor (Charlotte)
- Ian Flynn (born 1982), comic book writer (Charlotte)
- Penny Fuller (born 1940), actress (Durham)
- Mark Freiburger (born 1983), filmmaker (Charlotte)
- Zach Galifianakis (born 1969), comedian, actor, writer (Wilkesboro)
- Gallagher (1947–2022), comedian (Fort Bragg)
- Ava Gardner (1922–1990), actress (Smithfield)
- Cindy Garner (1926–2002), actress and model (High Point)
- Kathryn Grayson (1922–2010), actress and singer (Winston-Salem)
- Paul Green (1894–1981), Pulitzer Prize-winning playwright, author of The Lost Colony (Lillington)
- Hayes Grier (born 2000), internet personality (Davidson)
- Nash Grier (born 1997), internet personality (Davidson)
- Pam Grier (born 1949), actress (Winston-Salem)
- Rhoda Griffis (born 1945), actress (Raleigh)
- Andy Griffith (1926–2012), actor, singer, director (Mount Airy)
- George Grizzard (1928–2007), Emmy- and Tony-winning actor (Roanoke Rapids)
- Julianna Guill (born 1987), actress (Winston-Salem)
- Jester Hairston (1901–2000), actor (Belews Creek)
- Michael C. Hall (born 1971), actor (Raleigh)
- Murray Hamilton (1923–1986), actor (Washington)
- Shirley Hemphill (1947–1999), stand-up comedian, actress (Asheville)
- Jackee Harry (born 1956), actress (Winston-Salem)
- Molly Haskell (born 1939), film critic (Charlotte)
- Brady Hepner (born 2005), actor (Wallburg)
- Ed Hinton (1927–1958), actor (Wilmington)
- Aldis Hodge (born 1986), actor (Jacksonville)
- Edwin Hodge (born 1985), actor (Jacksonville)
- Gill Holland (born 1964), film producer (Davidson)
- Skip Hollandsworth (born 1957), screenwriter (Kannapolis)
- Laurel Holloman (born 1971), actress (Chapel Hill)
- Brian Huskey (born 1968), actor, comedian (Charlotte)
- Earle Hyman (1926–2017), actor (Rocky Mount)
- Anne Jeffreys (1923–2017), actress (Goldsboro)
- Burgess Jenkins (born 1973), actor (Winston-Salem)
- Ken Jeong (born 1969), comedian, actor (Greensboro)
- Star Jones (born 1962), television personality (Badin)
- Darwin Joston (1937–1998), actor (Winston-Salem)
- Allyn King (1899–1930), actress
- Tim Kirkman (born 1966), film director (Monroe)
- Sharon Lawrence (born 1961), actress (Charlotte / Raleigh)
- Beth Leavel (born 1955), actress (Raleigh)
- Chyler Leigh (born 1982), actress (Charlotte)
- Barbara Loden (1932–1980), actor and film director (Marion)

M–Z

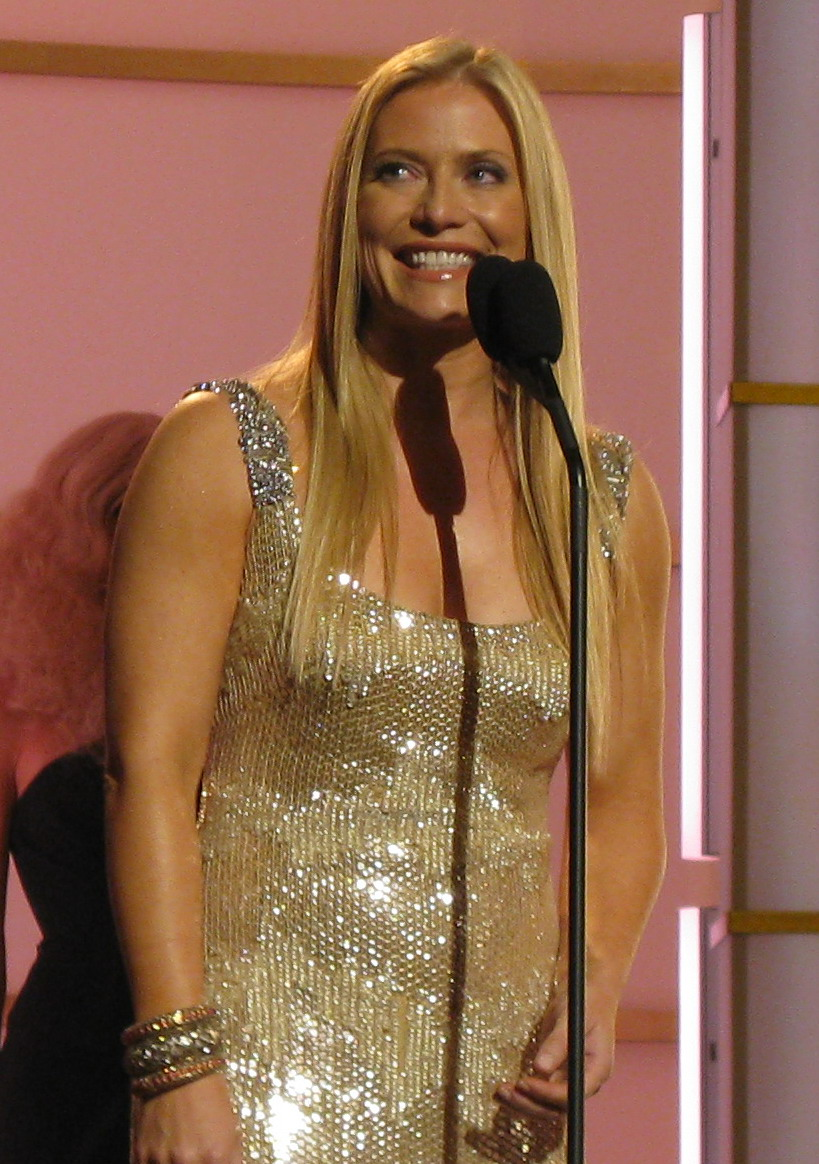
Emily Procter

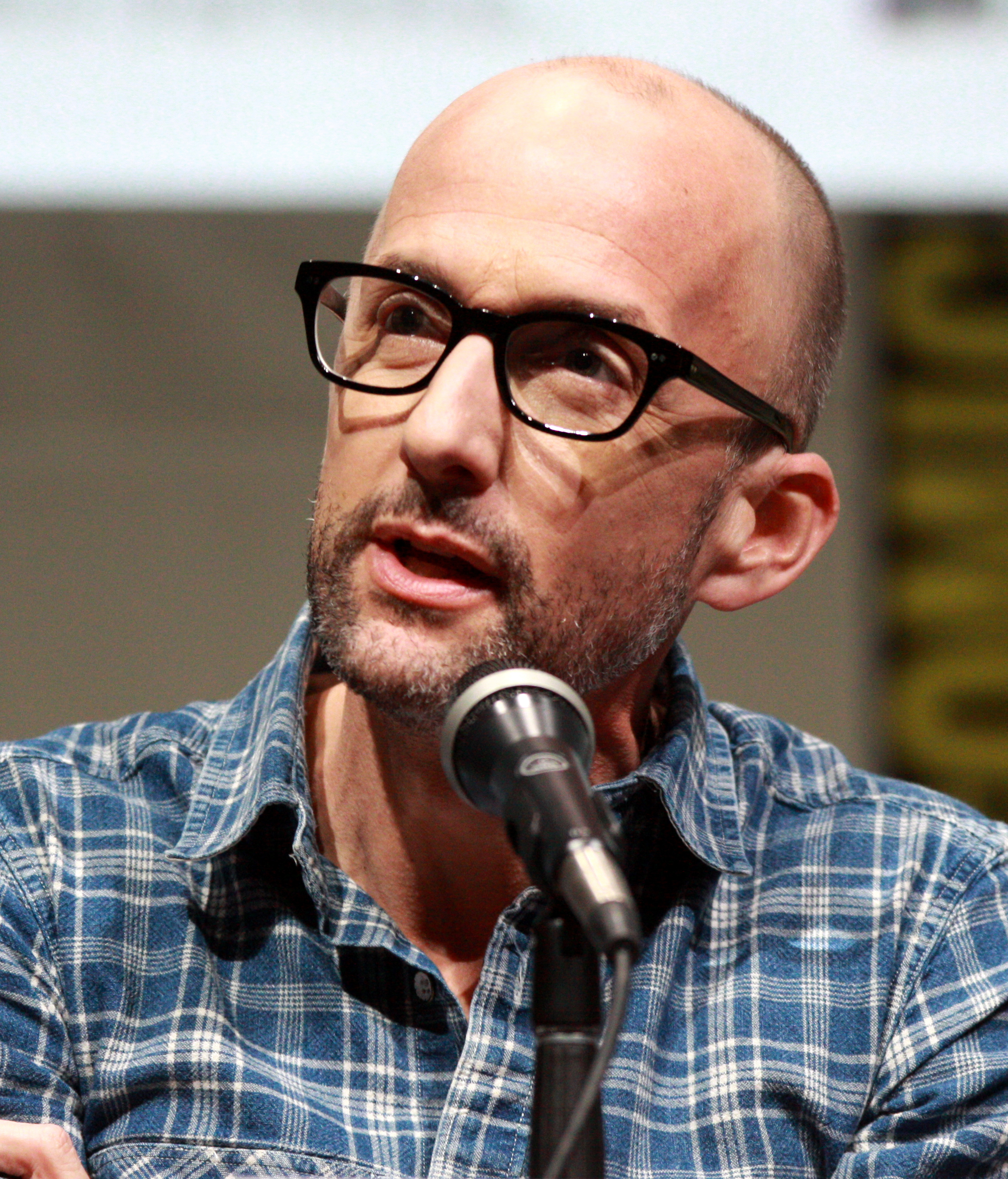
Jim Rash

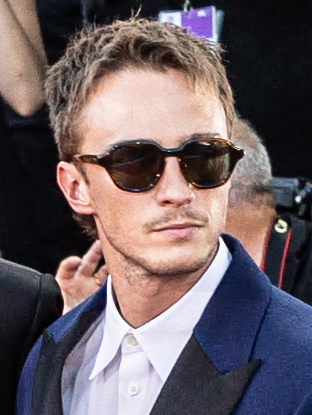
Drew Starkey

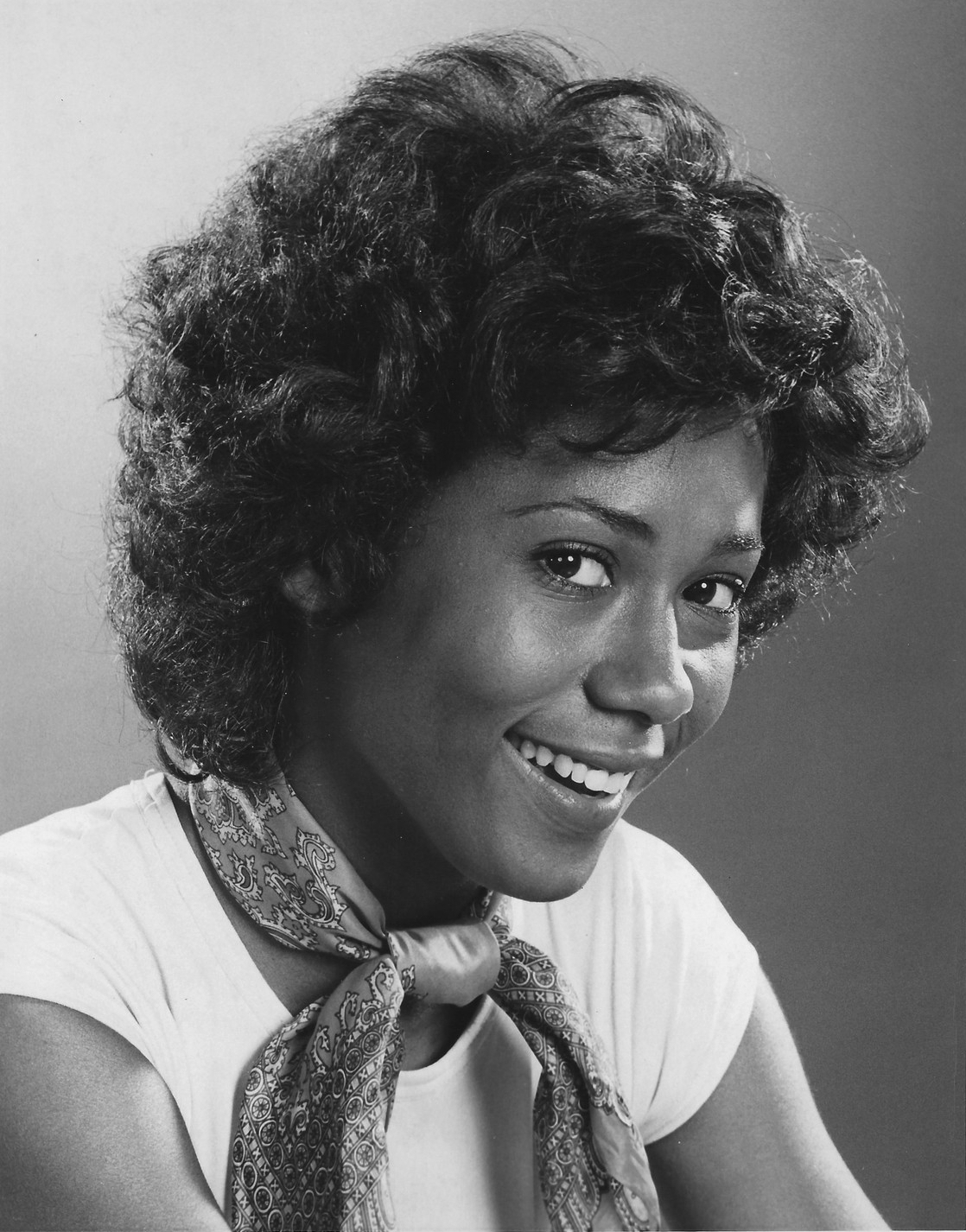
Berlinda Tolbert

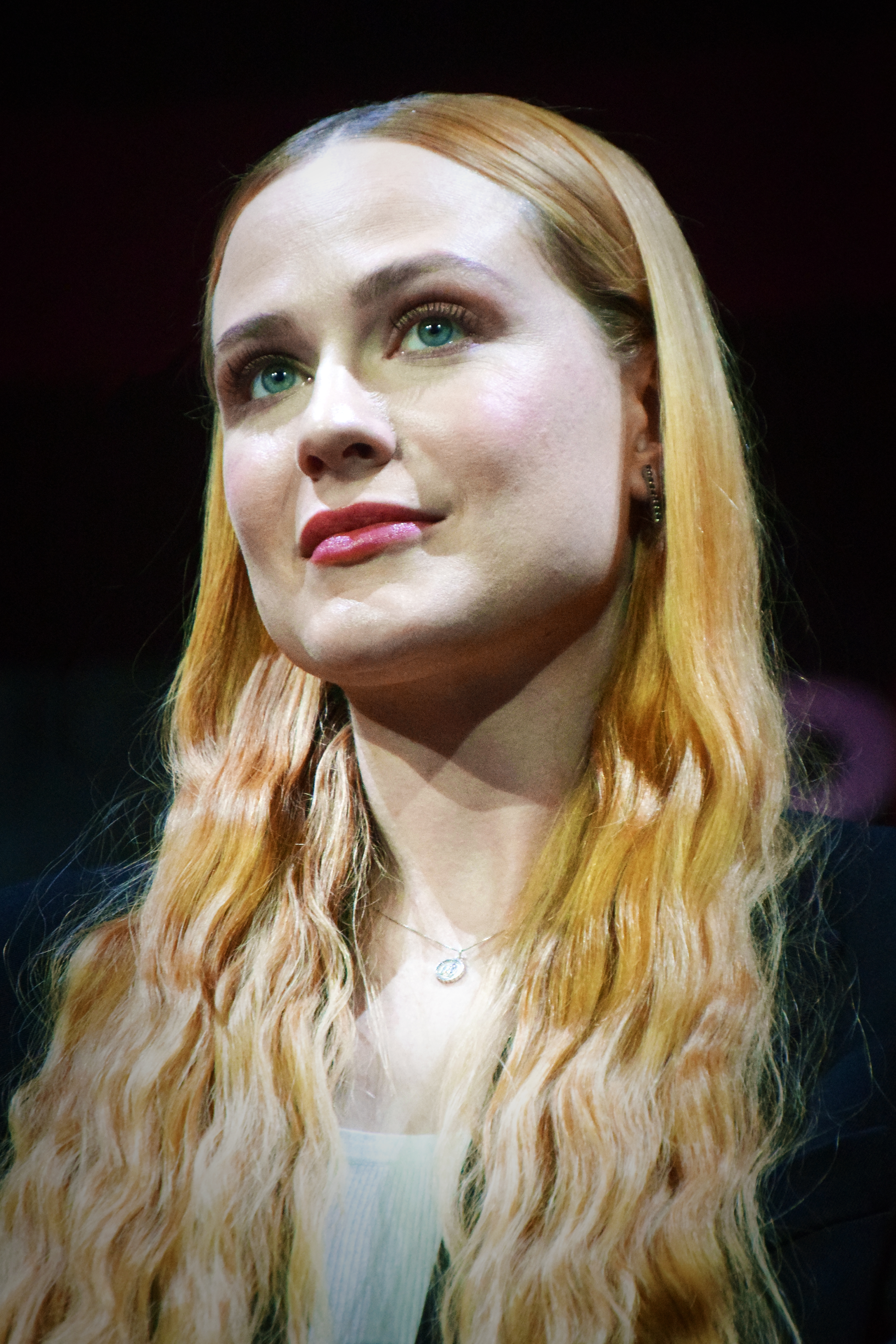
Evan Rachel Wood

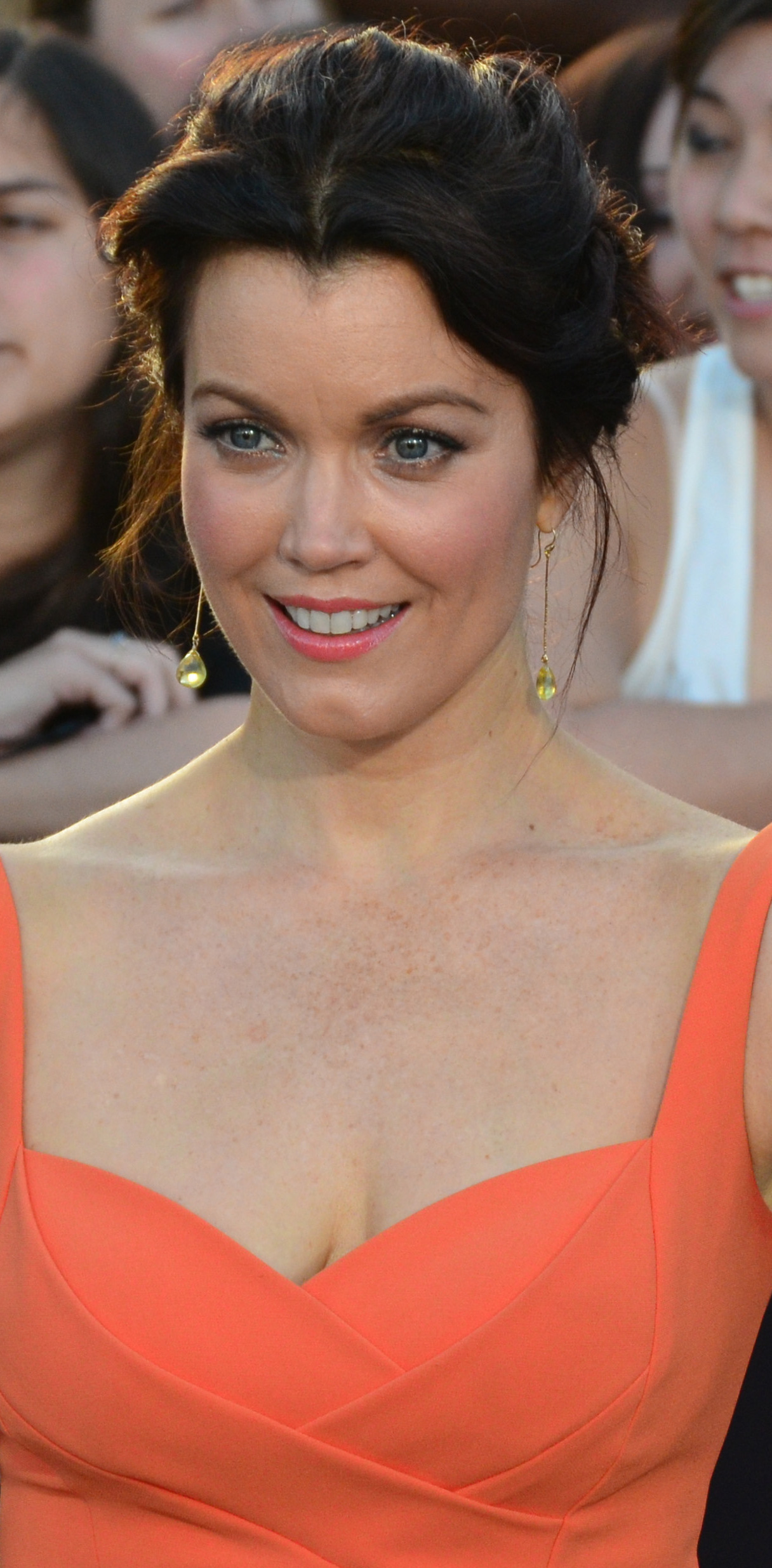
Bellamy Young

- James McEachin (born 1930), actor (Rennert)
- Rhett McLaughlin (born 1977), entertainer, best known for YouTube show Good Mythical Morning, raised in North Carolina (Buies Creek)
- Jane McNeill, actress (Whiteville)
- Robert Duncan McNeill (born 1964), actor, director (Raleigh)
- Eddie Mills (born 1972), actor (Kannapolis)
- Rogelio Mills, television personality, author, and recording artist (Charlotte)
- Julianne Moore (born 1960), actress (Fort Bragg)
- Anita Morris (1943–1994), actress (Durham)
- Anna Mercedes Morris (born 1977), stuntwoman (Charlotte)
- Laura Moss (born 1973), actress (Kings Mountain)
- Frankie Muniz (born 1985), actor, best known as the star of the popular television series Malcolm in the Middle, spent childhood in North Carolina (Knightdale)
- Mike Muscat (born 1952), actor (Fort Bragg)
- Link Neal (born 1978), entertainer, best known for YouTube show Good Mythical Morning (Buies Creek)
- John Haymes Newton (born 1965), actor (Chapel Hill)
- Lee Norris (born 1981), actor (Greenville)
- J.T. Petty (born 1977), video game maker (Raleigh)
- Jaime Pressly (born 1977), actress, model (Kinston)
- Emily Proctor (born 1968), actress (Raleigh)
- Reneé Rapp (born 2000), singer-songwriter and actress (Huntersville)
- Jim Rash (born 1970), actor, comedian (Charlotte)
- Peyton Reed (born 1964), film and television director (Raleigh)
- Jon Reep (born 1972), stand-up comedian (Hickory)
- Nina Repeta (born 1967), actress (Shelby)
- Tequan Richmond (born 1992), actor (Burlington)
- Britt Robertson (born 1990), actress (Charlotte)
- Marcy Rylan (born 1980), actress (Providence Township)
- Soupy Sales (1926–2009), comedian (Franklinton)
- Christoph Sanders (born 1988), actor (Arden / Hendersonville)
- Hunter Schafer (born 1999), actress (Raleigh)
- Paul Schneider (born 1976), actor (Asheville)
- Judith Scott, actress (Fort Bragg)
- Nick Searcy (born 1959), actor (Cullowhee)
- Amy Sedaris (born 1961), actress and comedian, spent childhood in NC, best known as the star of the television series Strangers with Candy (Raleigh)
- David Sedaris (born 1956), author and essayist (brother to Amy), spent childhood in NC (Raleigh)
- Matthew Settle (born 1969), actor (Hickory)
- J. B. Smoove (born 1964), actor (Plymouth)
- Arthur Smith (1921–2014), musician, composer, radio and television producer (Charlotte)
- Josef Sommer (born 1934), character actor, appeared in movies such as X-Men: The Last Stand, The Sum of All Fears, and Patch Adams (raised in North Carolina)
- Drew Starkey (born 1993), actor (Hickory
- Margo Stilley (born 1982), actress (Bear Creek)
- Jessica Stroup (born 1986), actress (Charlotte)
- Jeff Tremaine (born 1966), film and television director, producer, and screenwriter (Durham)
- Berlinda Tolbert, film and television actress (Charlotte)
- Skeet Ulrich (born 1970), actor (Concord)
- Liz Vassey (born 1972), actress (Raleigh)
- Reginald VelJohnson (born 1952), actor (Raleigh)
- Ben Vereen (born 1946), actor, entertainer (Laurinburg)
- Jill Wagner (born 1979), actress, model (Winston-Salem)
- Gregory Walcott (1928–2015), actor (Wendell)
- James Harvey Ward (born 1978), actor (Greenville)
- Lachlan Watson (born 2001), actor (Raleigh)
- Kevin Williamson (born 1965), screenwriter (New Bern)
- Mary Elizabeth Winstead (born 1984), actress (Rocky Mount)
- Evan Rachel Wood (born 1987), actress (Raleigh)
- Bellamy Young (born 1970), actress (Asheville)

== Government, military, and public figures ==
A–I

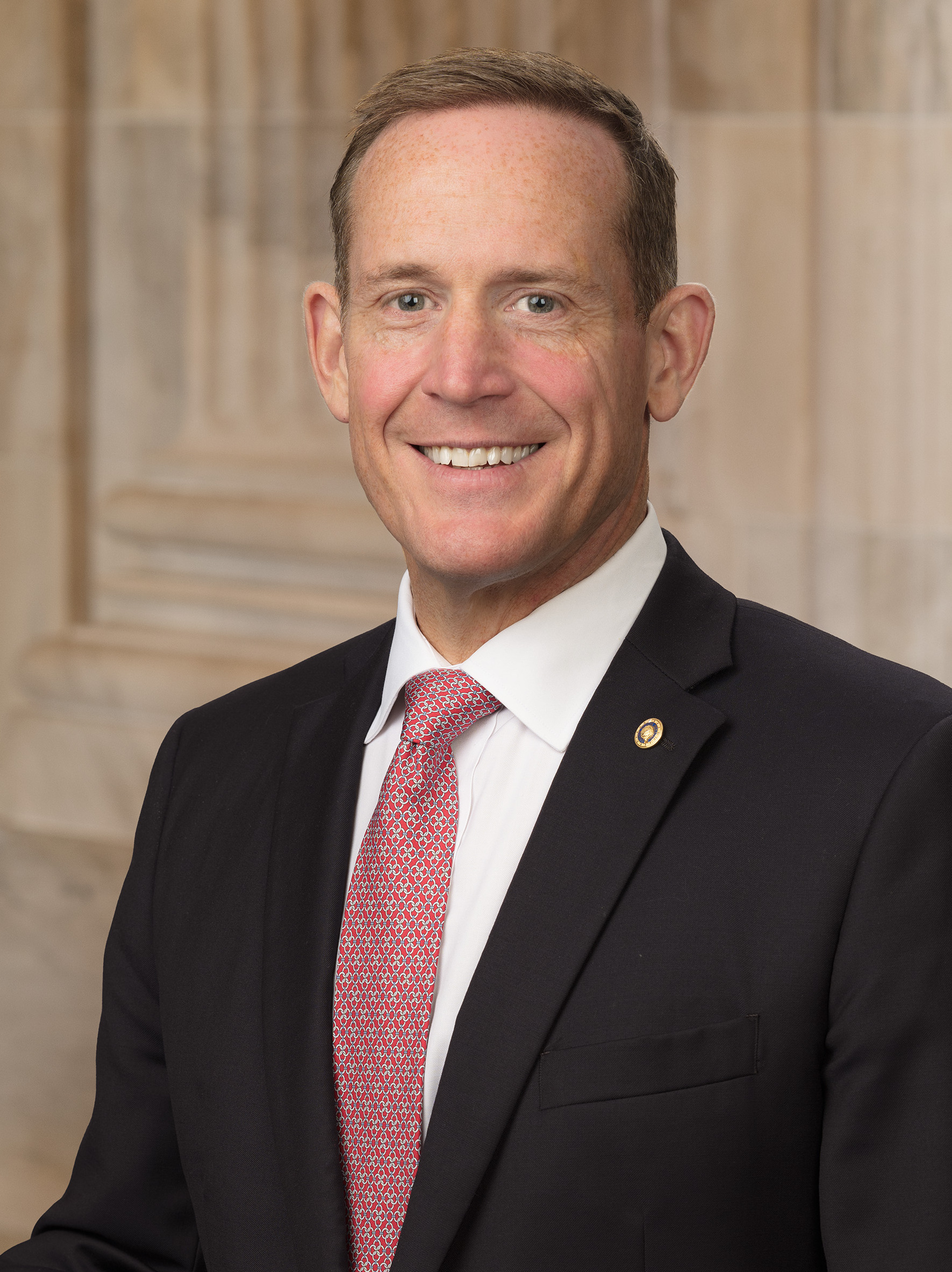
Ted Budd

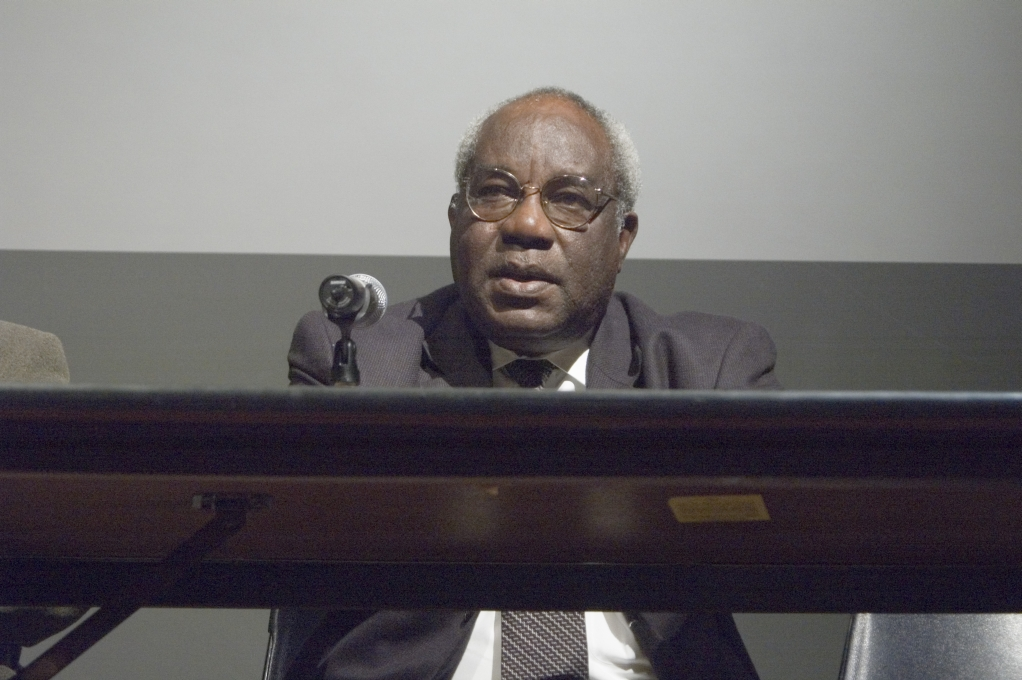
Julius L. Chambers

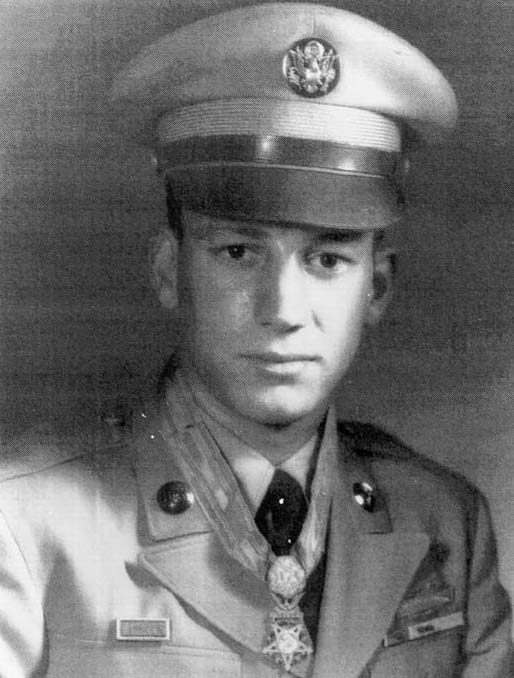
Jerry K. Crump

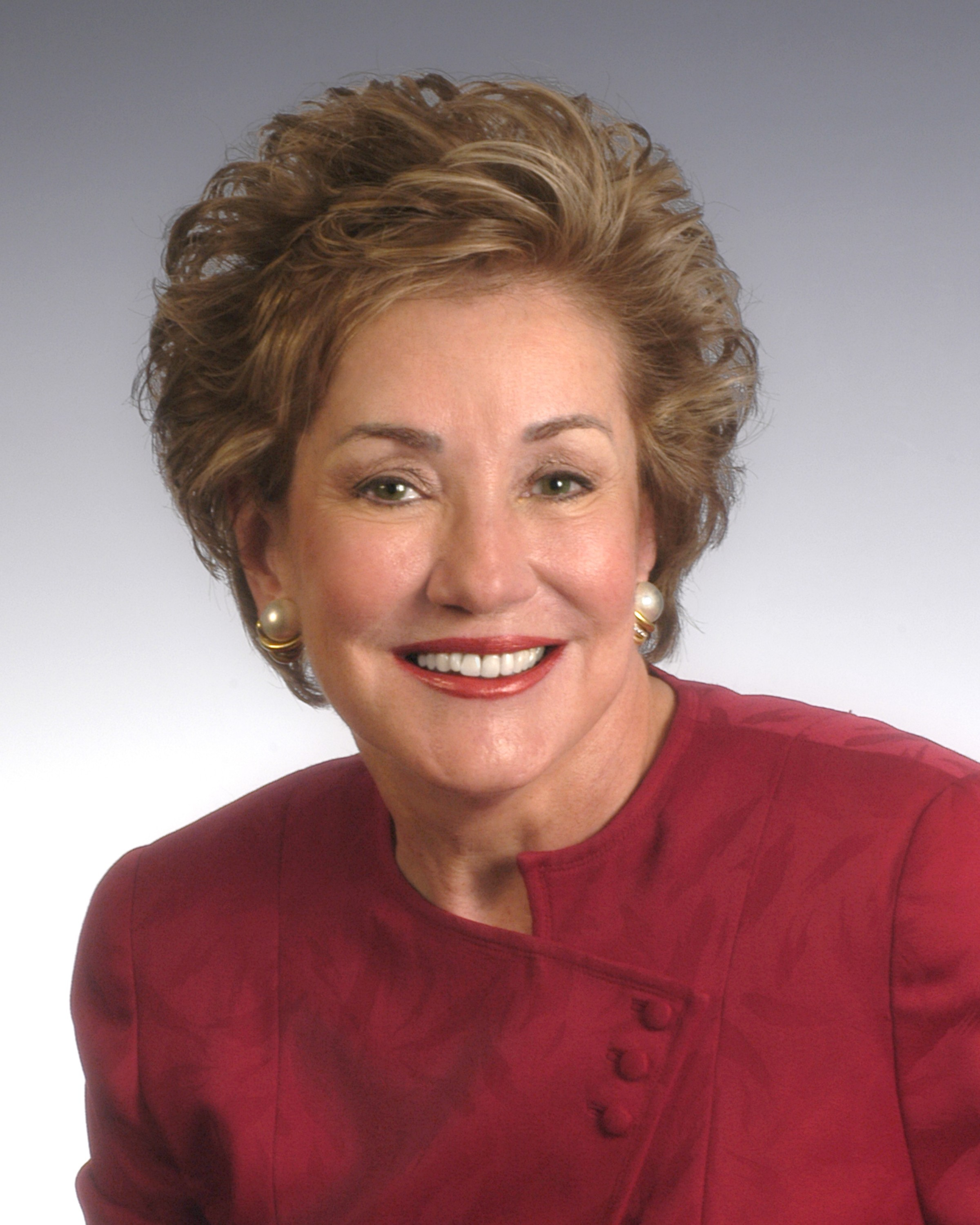
Elizabeth Dole

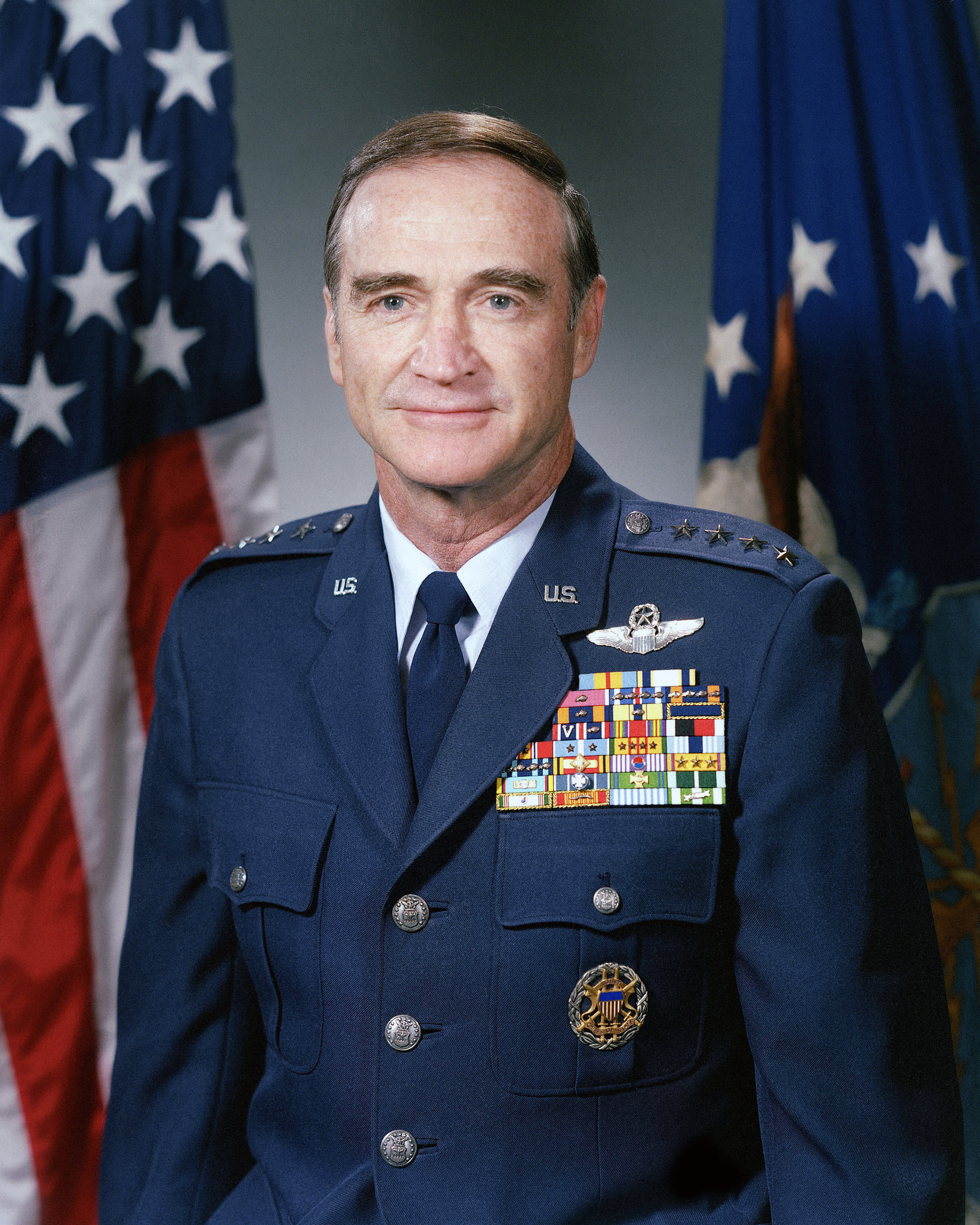
Charles A. Gabriel

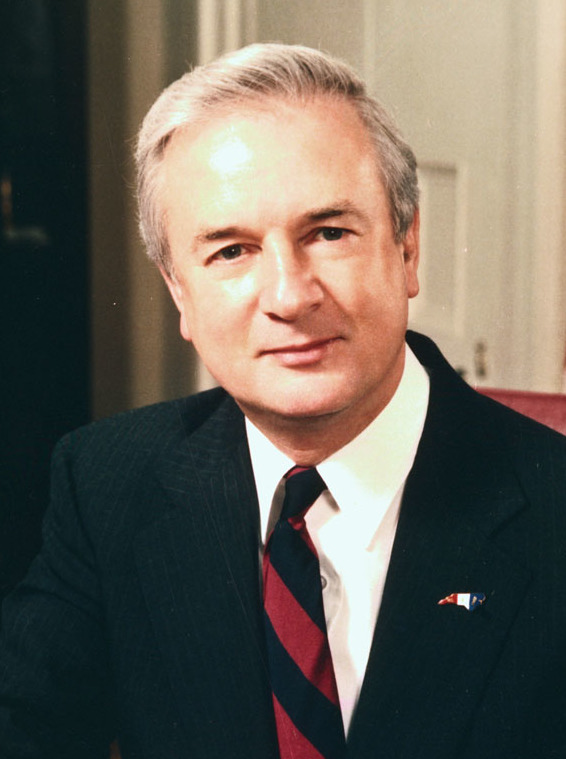
Jim Hunt

- Alma Adams (born 1946), U.S. congresswoman 2014–present (High Point)
- Nathaniel Alexander (1756–1808), physician and politician who served as the 13th governor of the U.S. state of North Carolina from 1805 to 1807 (Concord)
- Teddy G. Allen (born 1936), retired lieutenant general in the United States Army; served as director of the Defense Security Assistance Agency from 1990 to 1993 and as commanding general of the 101st Airborne Division from 1987 to 1989 (Farmville)
- John Ashe (1725–1781), brigadier general during the American Revolutionary War, in charge of North Carolina militia and state troops 1776–1779 (New Hanover County)
- Andrew James Bates (born 1987), former White House Senior Deputy Press Secretary under Joe Biden (Winston-Salem)
- William Blount (1749–1800), first North Carolina signatory of United States Constitution; played a role in the creation of the State of Tennessee (Windsor)
- Erskine Bowles (born 1945), White House Chief of Staff under Bill Clinton, president of University of North Carolina system (Greensboro)
- William G. Boykin, Deputy Undersecretary of Defense for Intelligence under George W. Bush, retired lieutenant general for U.S. Army (New Bern)
- Braxton Bragg (1817–1876), general in Confederate States Army; led Confederate Army of Tennessee in battles of Perryville, Stones River, Chickamauga, and Third Battle of Chattanooga against Union General Ulysses Grant (Warrenton)
- Jim Broyhill (born 1927), former Republican U.S. representative and senator from North Carolina; son of furniture magnate J. E. Broyhill (Lenoir)
- Ted Budd (born 1971), United States senator (Davie County)
- James Burnley (born 1948), U.S. Secretary of Transportation under President Ronald Reagan (Greensboro)
- Robert Byrd (1917–2010), U.S. senator from West Virginia; longest-serving senator in American history (North Wilkesboro)
- Lee Carter, elected delegate for 50th House district of Virginia and retired U.S. Marine veteran as IT specialist (Elizabeth City)
- Richard Caswell (1729–1789), served as the first and fifth governor of the U.S. state of North Carolina 1776–1780 and 1785–1787 (Kinston)
- Julius L. Chambers (1936–2013), civil rights attorney who successfully argued 1971 Swann v. Charlotte-Mecklenburg Board of Education school busing case before U.S. Supreme Court (Mount Gilead)
- Levi Coffin (1798–1877), abolitionist and educator known as "president" of the Underground Railroad; credited with helping over 2,000 slaves escape to freedom before Civil War (Greensboro)
- Roy Cooper (born 1957), 75th governor of North Carolina (Nashville)
- Jerry K. Crump (1933–1977), U.S. Army soldier; Medal of Honor recipient (Charlotte)
- Josephus Daniels (1862–1948), U.S. Secretary of the Navy 1913–1921 under President Woodrow Wilson; journalist and founder of Raleigh News and Observer newspaper (Washington)
- William Dodd (1869–1940), U.S. ambassador to Nazi-Germany 1933–1938 under Franklin Roosevelt (Clayton)
- Elizabeth Dole (born 1936), U.S. senator and Secretary of Transportation under President Ronald Reagan; wife to former Republican Senate Majority Leader Bob Dole (Salisbury)
- Sam Ervin (1896–1985), four-term U.S. senator and chairman of Senate Watergate Investigation Committee; began legislative process which led to resignation of President Richard Nixon (Morganton)
- Virginia Foxx (born 1943), U.S. congresswoman 2005–present; graduated from the University of North Carolina at Chapel Hill (Crossnore)
- Charles A. Gabriel (1928–2003), U.S. Air Force general, 11th chief of staff of U.S. Air Force (Lincolnton)
- Nick Galifianakis (born 1928), U.S. congressman from North Carolina 1967–1973 (Durham)
- Richard Jordan Gatling (1818–1903), physician and inventor of Gatling gun (Hertford County)
- Charles George (1932–1952), United States Army soldier; Medal of Honor recipient (Cherokee)
- John Gibbon (1827–1896), Union Army general in American Civil War and colonel in the American Indian Wars (Charlotte)
- The Greensboro Four, male African-American students at North Carolina A&T State University who in 1960 started first civil rights sit-in; led to restaurants being desegregated throughout Southern U.S.
- John H. Hager (1936–2020), lieutenant governor of Virginia
- Destin Hall (born 1987), attorney and politician who has served in the North Carolina House of Representatives, representing the 87th district (Lenoir)
- William D. Halyburton Jr. (1924–1945), United States Navy hospital corpsman; posthumously awarded Medal of Honor (Wilmington)
- Jesse Helms (1921–2008), retired five-term senator from North Carolina and national spokesman for right-wing causes (Monroe)
- James Pinckney Henderson (1808–1858), lawyer, politician, soldier, and first governor of Texas (Lincolnton)
- Robert Hoke (1837–1912), major general in Confederate States Army, director of North Carolina Railroad (Lincolnton)
- William Woods Holden (1818–1892), prominent Southern Unionist, served as 38th and 40th governor of North Carolina (Hillsborough)
- James Holshouser (1934–2013), 68th governor of North Carolina (Boone)
- Jim Hunt (born 1937), governor of North Carolina for a record four terms; opposed Jesse Helms in 1984 Senate race (Wilson)

J–Z

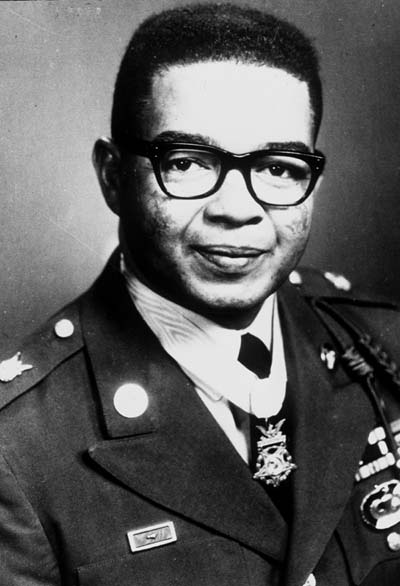
Lawrence Joel

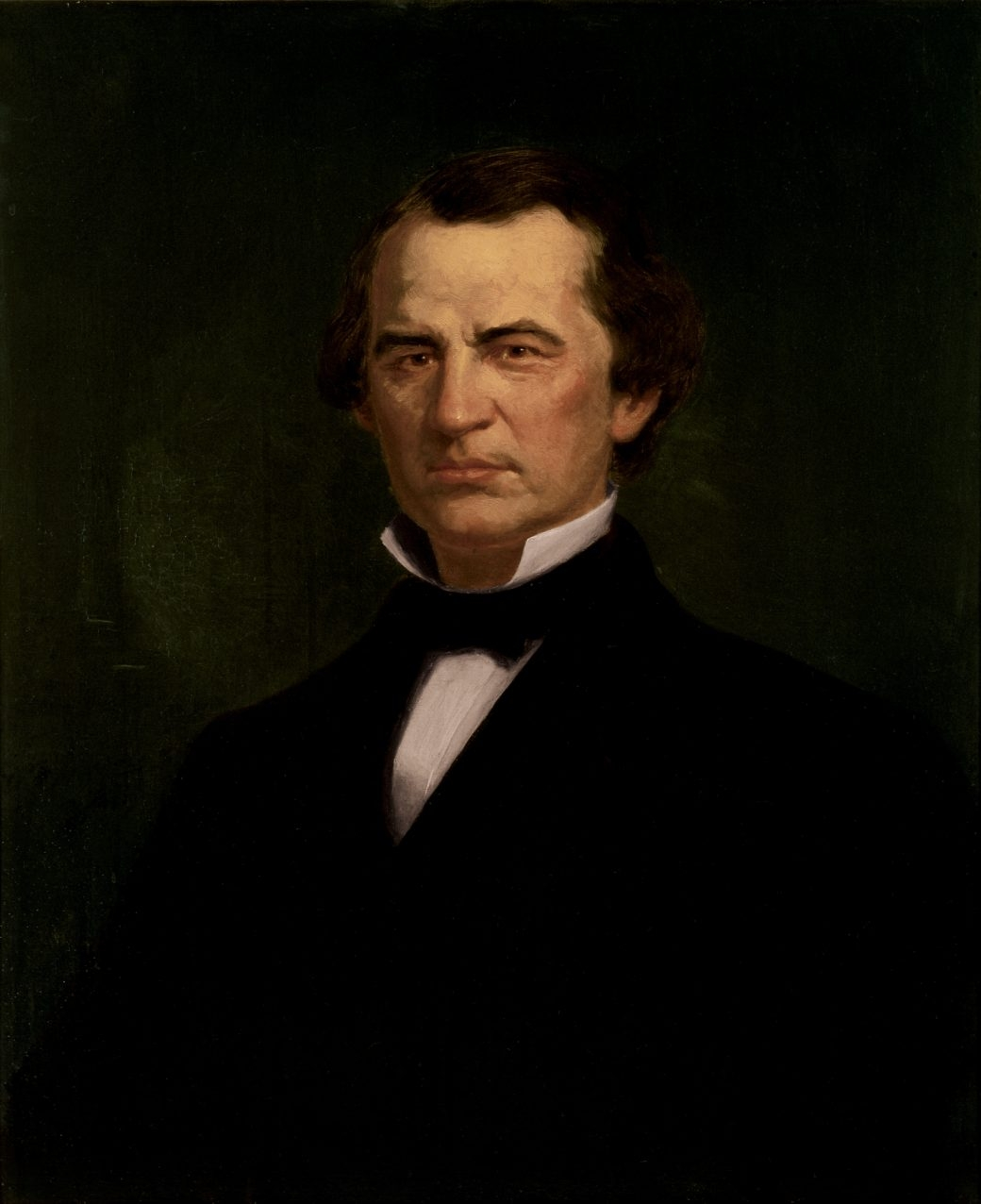
Andrew Johnson

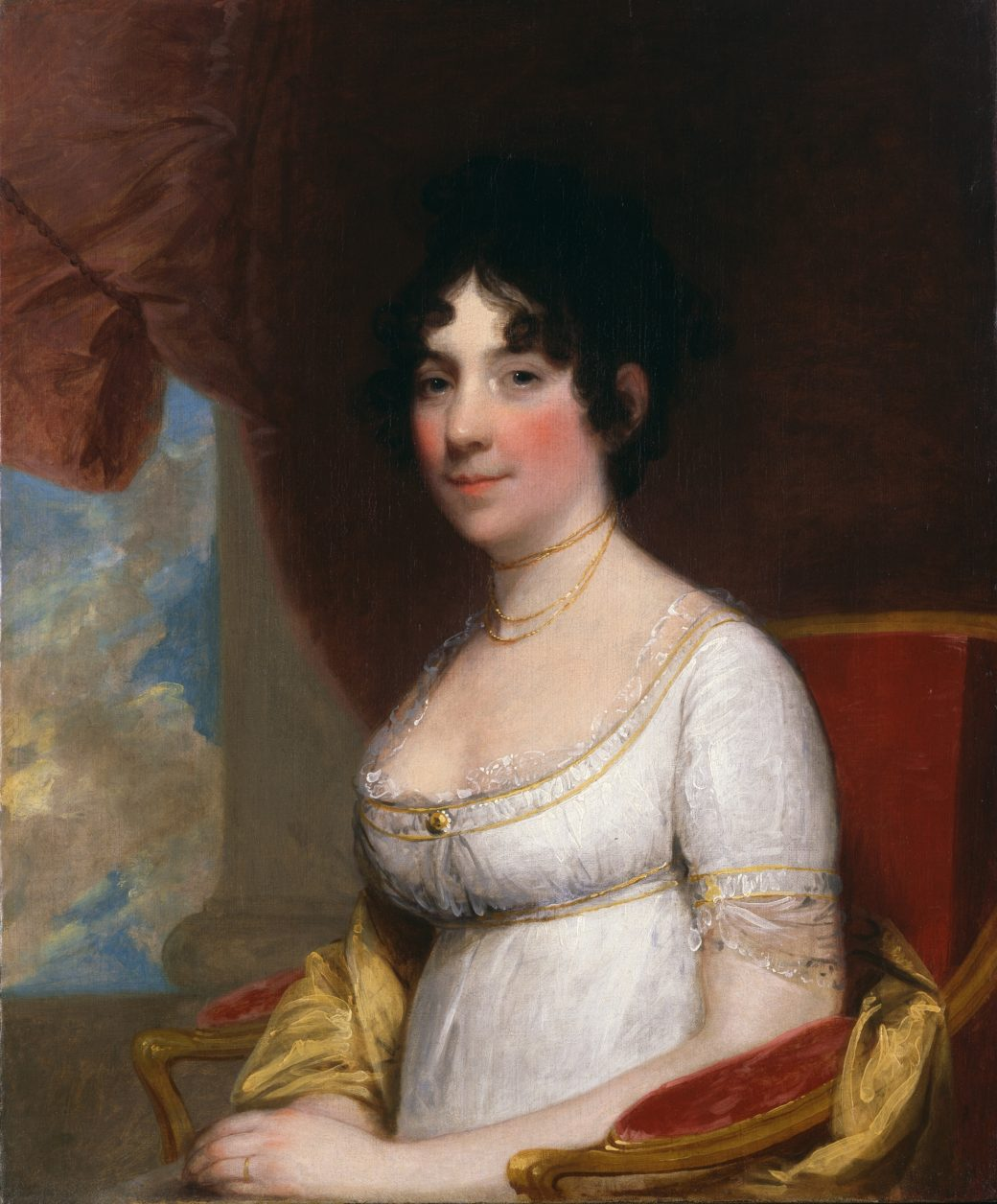
Dolley Madison

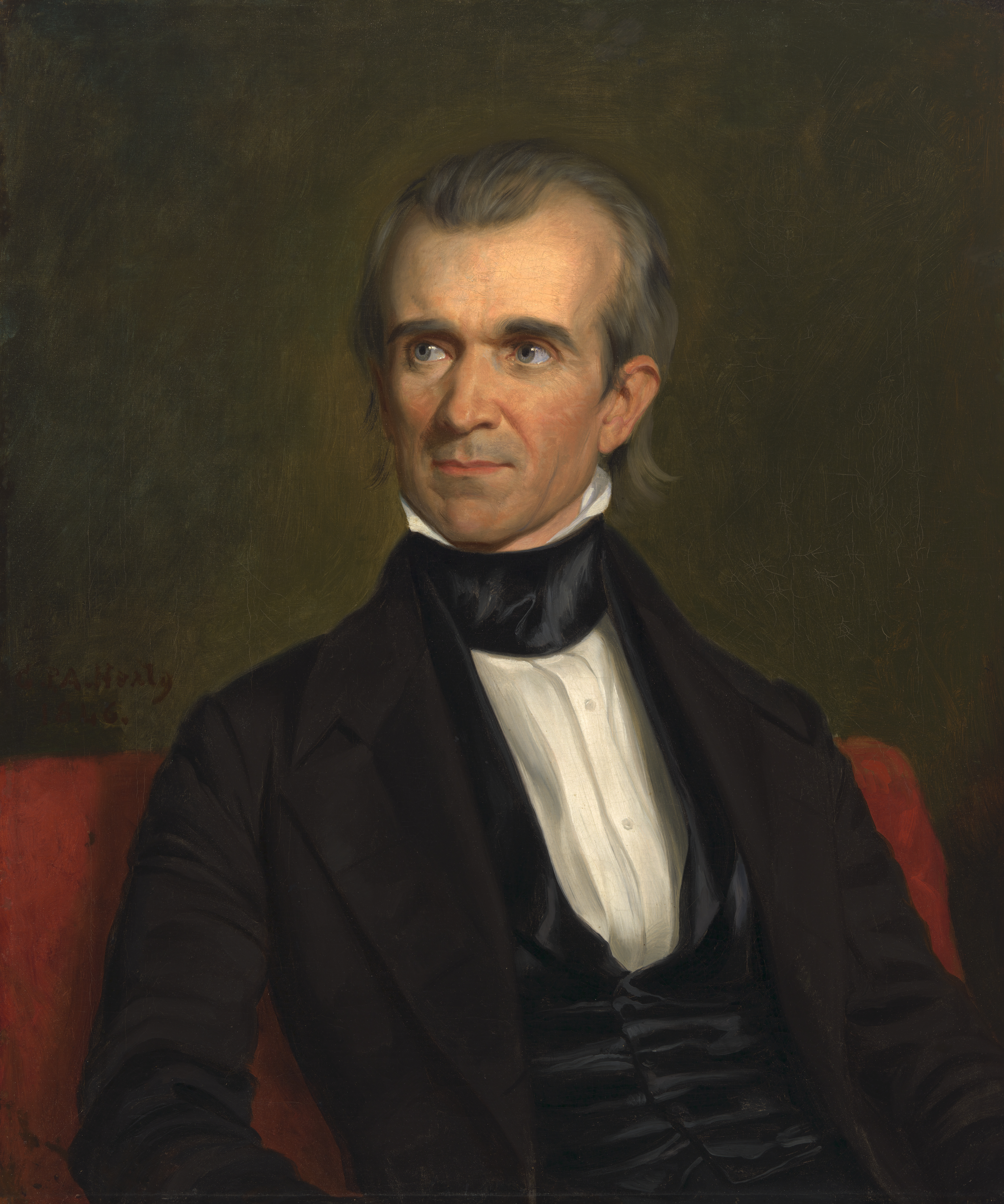
James K. Polk

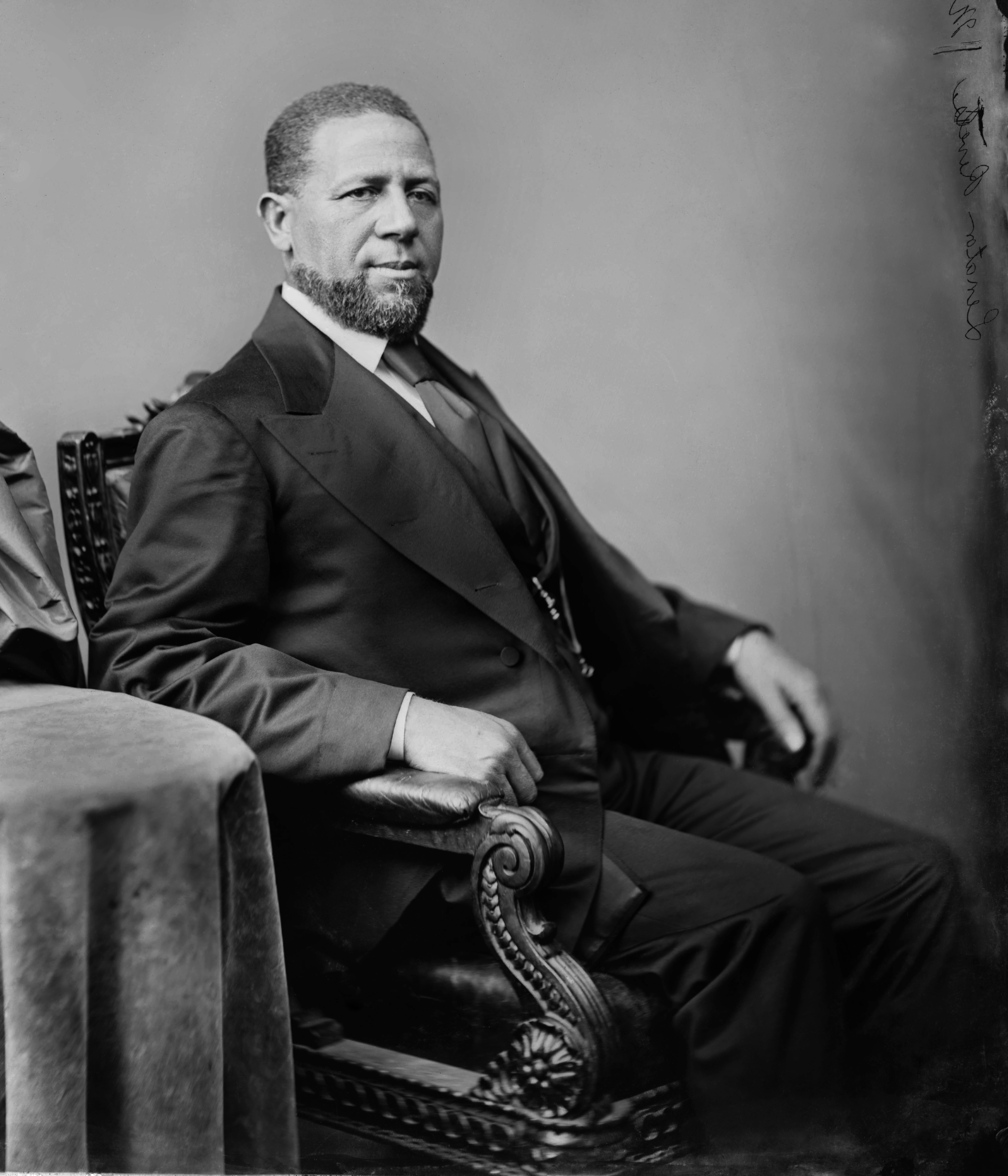
Hiram Rhodes Revels

- Andrew Jackson (1767–1845), 7th president of the United States, 1829–1837 (Waxhaws) (birth records are unclear; he may be from South Carolina side of border)
- Lawrence Joel (1928–1984), United States Army soldier; Medal of Honor recipient (Winston-Salem)
- Andrew Johnson (1808–1875), 17th president of the United States, 1865–1869 (Raleigh)
- Henry Johnson (1892–1929), United States Army soldier in World War I; posthumously awarded Medal of Honor (Winston-Salem)
- Joseph Lane (1801–1881), United States Army general and member of U.S. Senate from Oregon (Buncombe County)
- William Lenoir (1751–1839), patriot, served in the Battle of Kings Mountain and several other skirmishes during the American Revolution; first president of the board of trustees of the University of North Carolina at Chapel Hill (Wilkes County)
- Dolley Madison (1768–1849), wife of President James Madison (Guilford County)
- Linda McMahon (born 1948), administrator of the Small Business Administration under President Donald Trump (New Bern)
- Solomon Meredith (1810–1875), Union Army general, one of the commanders of the Iron Brigade of the Army of the Potomac (Guilford County)
- Bartholomew F. Moore (1801–1878), North Carolina attorney general and legislator
- Mick Mulvaney (born 1967), South Carolina congressman, director of Office of Management and Budget under President Donald Trump (Charlotte)
- Hardy Murfree (1752–1809), lieutenant colonel from North Carolina during the American Revolutionary War (Murfreesboro)
- Charles P. Murray Jr. (1921–2011), United States Army officer; Medal of Honor recipient during World War II (Wilmington)
- Walter Hines Page (1855–1918), U.S. ambassador to Britain during First World War (Cary)
- William Dorsey Pender (1834–1863), major general, one of youngest generals in Confederate States Army, mortally wounded at Battle of Gettysburg (Edgecombe County)
- James K. Polk (1795–1849), 11th president of the United States, 1845–1849 (Mecklenburg County)
- Eliza Jane Pratt (1902–1981), U.S. congresswoman 1946–1947 (Anson County)
- Stephen Dodson Ramseur (1837–1864), major general in Confederate States Army; mortally wounded at the Battle of Cedar Creek Virginia (Lincolnton)
- William Cary Renfrow (1845–1922), 3rd governor of Oklahoma Territory, 1893–1897 (Smithfield)
- Hiram Revels (1822–1901), first African-American member of United States Senate (Fayetteville)
- Jennifer Roberts (born 1960), served as the 58th mayor of Charlotte (Charlotte)
- Terry Sanford (1917–1998), served as the 65th governor of North Carolina 1961–1965, and U.S. senator 1986–1993 (Laurinburg)
- W. Kerr Scott (1896–1958), served as the 62nd governor of North Carolina 1949–1953, and U.S. senator 1954–1958 (Haw River)
- Hugh Shelton (born 1942), retired U.S. Army general, chairman of Joint Chiefs of Staff 1997–2001 (Tarboro)
- Edward Snowden (born 1983), NSA contractor who leaked top-secret documents regarding worldwide spying program (Elizabeth City)
- Richard Dobbs Spaight Sr (1758–1802), second NC signatory of U.S. Constitution and eighth governor of North Carolina (New Bern)
- Edgar V. Starnes (born 1956), served in the North Carolina General Assembly (Granite Falls)
- Blake Wayne Van Leer (1926–1997), commander and captain in the U.S. Navy, led SeaBee program and led the nuclear research and power unit at McMurdo Station during Operation Deep Freeze (Raleigh)
- James E. Webb (1906–1992), served as Undersecretary of State from 1949 to 1952, and was the second administrator of NASA from 1961 to 1968 (Granville County)
- Theophilus Weeks (1708–1772), soldier in the French and Indian War, founder of the town of Swansboro, North Carolina (Swansboro)
- Robert F. Williams (1925–1996), civil rights activist who advocated using black armed guards to defend African-American neighborhoods from white supremacist groups (Monroe)
- John Ancrum Winslow (1811–1873), officer in the United States Navy during the Mexican–American War and American Civil War (Wilmington)

== Journalism and media ==
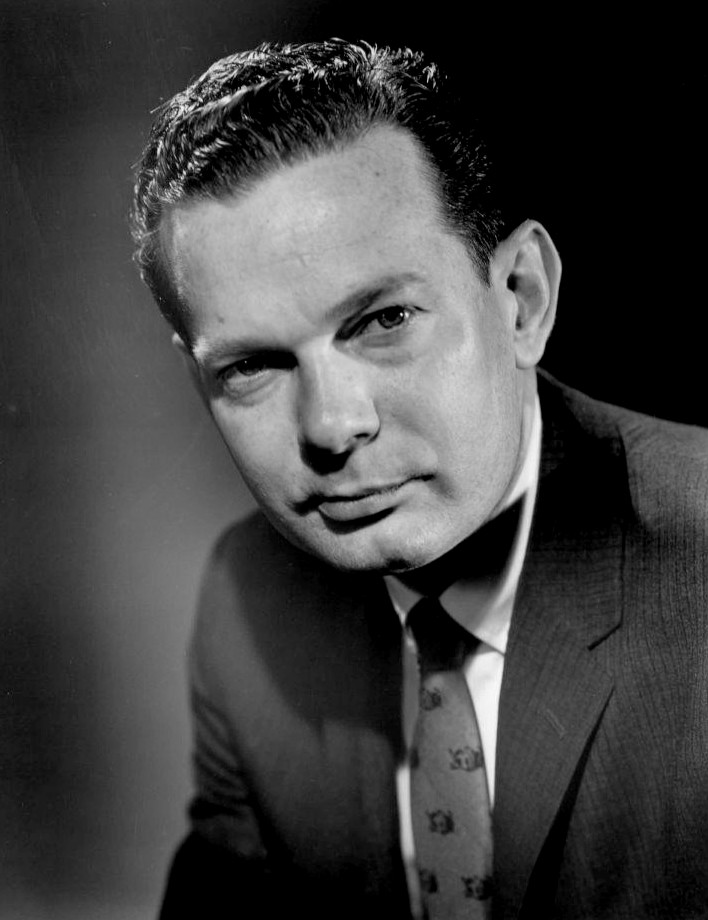
David Brinkley

Jim Nantz

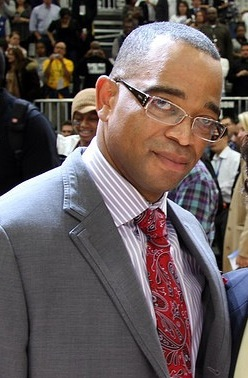
Stuart Scott

- Mary Ann Akers, political gossip columnist (High Point)
- David Brinkley (1920–2003), television newscaster, host of ABC-TV's This Week with David Brinkley 1981–96; co-anchor of the Huntley-Brinkley Report nightly newscast on NBC-TV 1956–70 (Wilmington)
- Sharon Dahlonega Raiford Bush, née Sharon Crews (born 1952), American television's first African-American female weather anchor of prime-time news (Greensboro)
- Howard Cosell (1918–1995), television sports journalist, star of ABC's Monday Night Football, commentator for many fights of Muhammad Ali (Winston-Salem)
- Josephus Daniels (1862–1948), founder of Raleigh News and Observer newspaper; U.S. Secretary of the Navy 1913–1921 under President Woodrow Wilson (Washington)
- David Gergen (born 1942), journalist; editor-at-large for U.S. News & World Report; director of Center for Public Leadership at John F. Kennedy School of Government at Harvard; senior political analyst at CNN (Durham)
- Al Hunt (born 1942), journalist, managing editor for Bloomberg News, panelist on CNN's Capital Gang news program (Winston-Salem)
- Carl Kassel (1934–2018), radio personality for NPR and journalist (Goldsboro)
- Anna Kooiman (born 1984), anchor and reporter for Fox News; co-host of Fox & Friends (Charlotte)
- Charles Kuralt (1934–1997), journalist and CBS television personality (Wilmington)
- Jennifer Loven, journalist and White House correspondent for Associated Press (Matthews)
- Edward R. Murrow (1908–1965), CBS News journalist and pioneer of television (near Greensboro)
- Jim Nantz (born 1959), sportscaster (Charlotte)
- Walter Hines Page (1855–1918), journalist and publisher (Cary)
- Morgan Radford (born 1987), news reporter for NBC News and MSNBC (Greensboro)
- Rochelle Riley, columnist for the Detroit Free Press (Tarboro)
- Charlie Rose (born 1942), interviewer and journalist; host of PBS television talk show and CBS This Morning (Henderson)
- Vermont C. Royster (1914–1996), editor-in-chief of The Wall Street Journal 1957–1970; winner of two Pulitzer Prizes (Raleigh)
- Stuart Scott (1965–2015), television sportscaster, anchor of ESPN's SportsCenter; graduated from University of North Carolina (Winston-Salem)
- André Leon Talley (1949–2022), professional fashion journalist and former editor-at-large of Vogue (Durham)
- Wilbert Tatum (1933–2009), editor, publisher, chairman and chief executive officer of New York Amsterdam

== Musicians ==
A–G

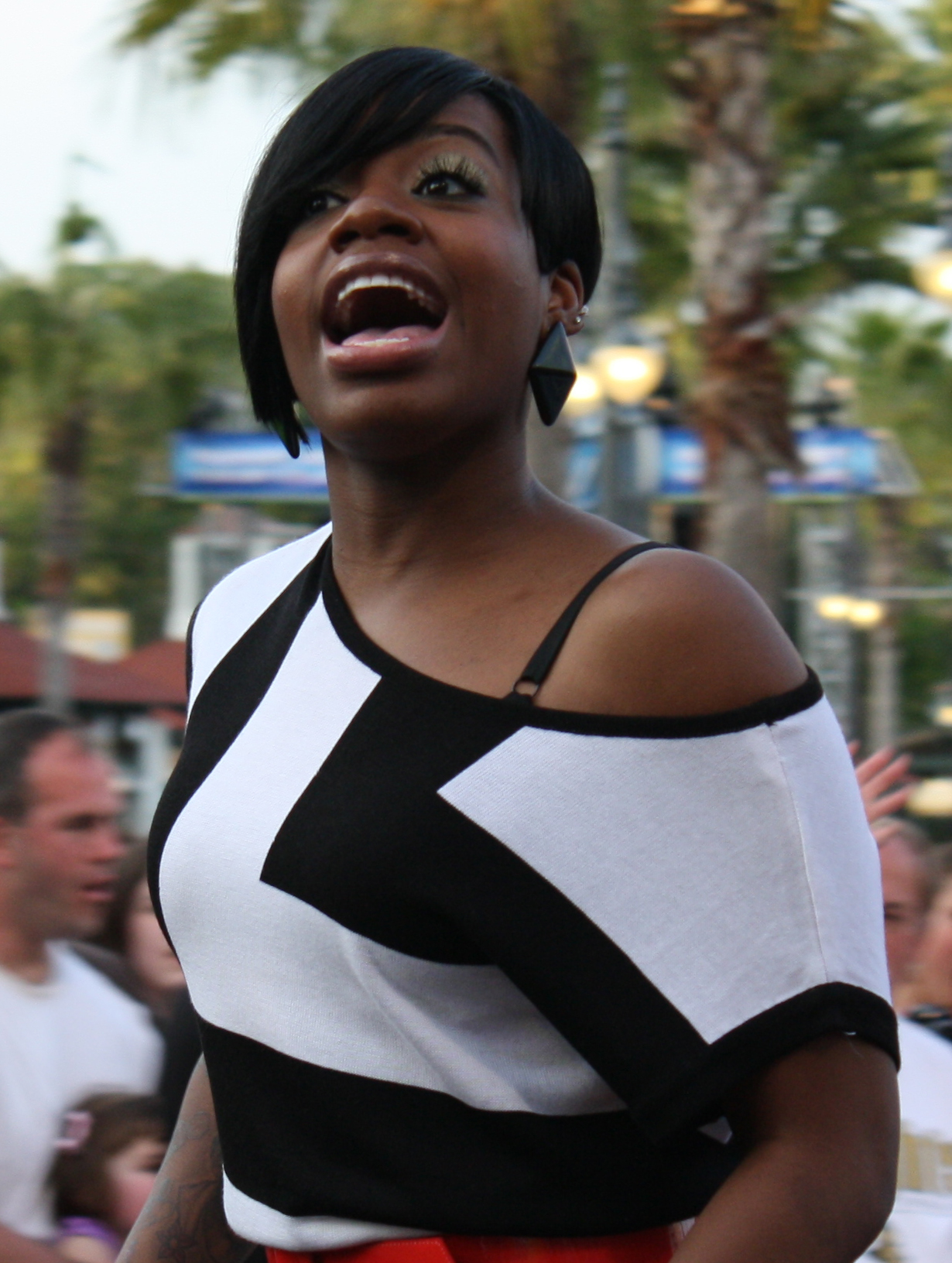
Fantasia Barrino

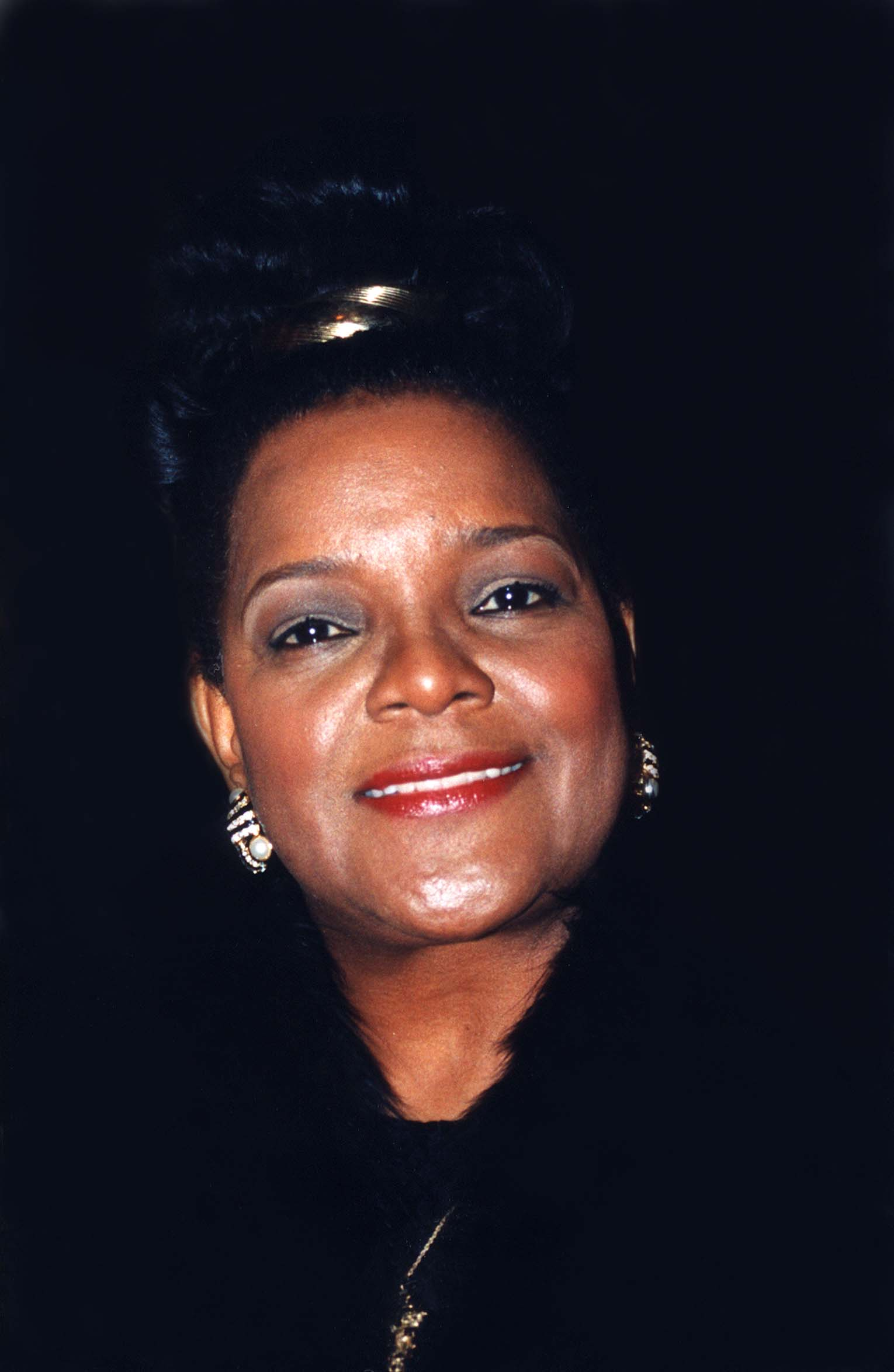
Shirley Caesar

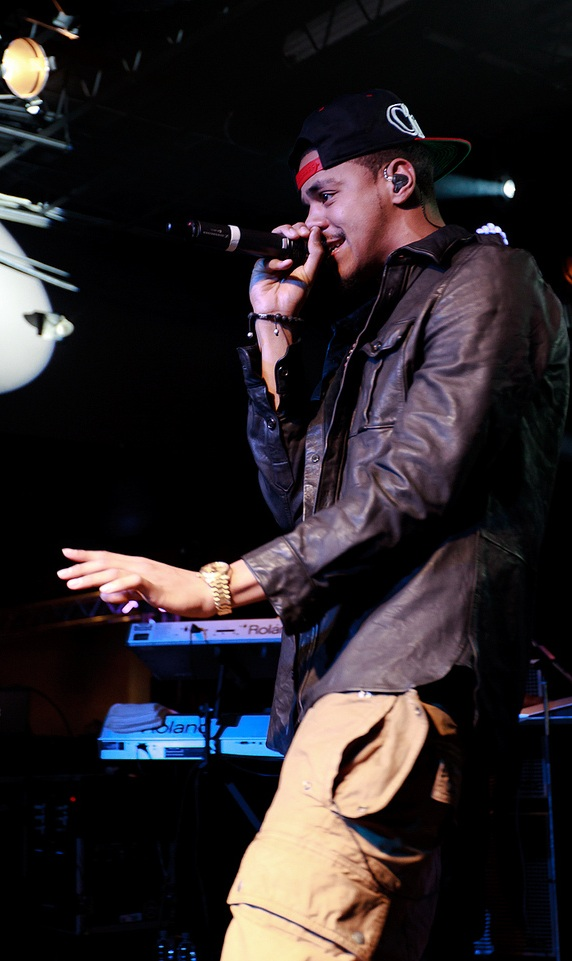
J. Cole

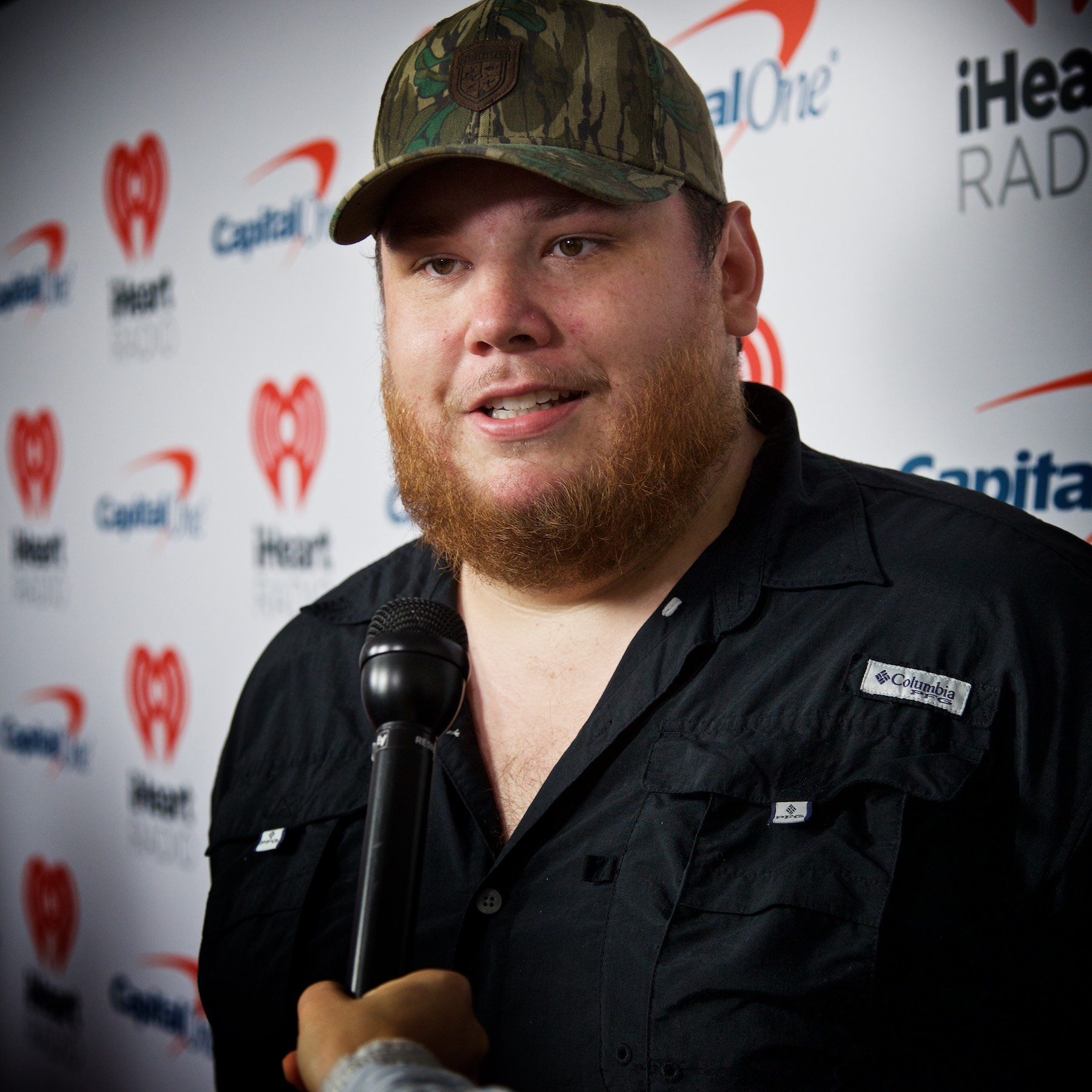
Luke Combs

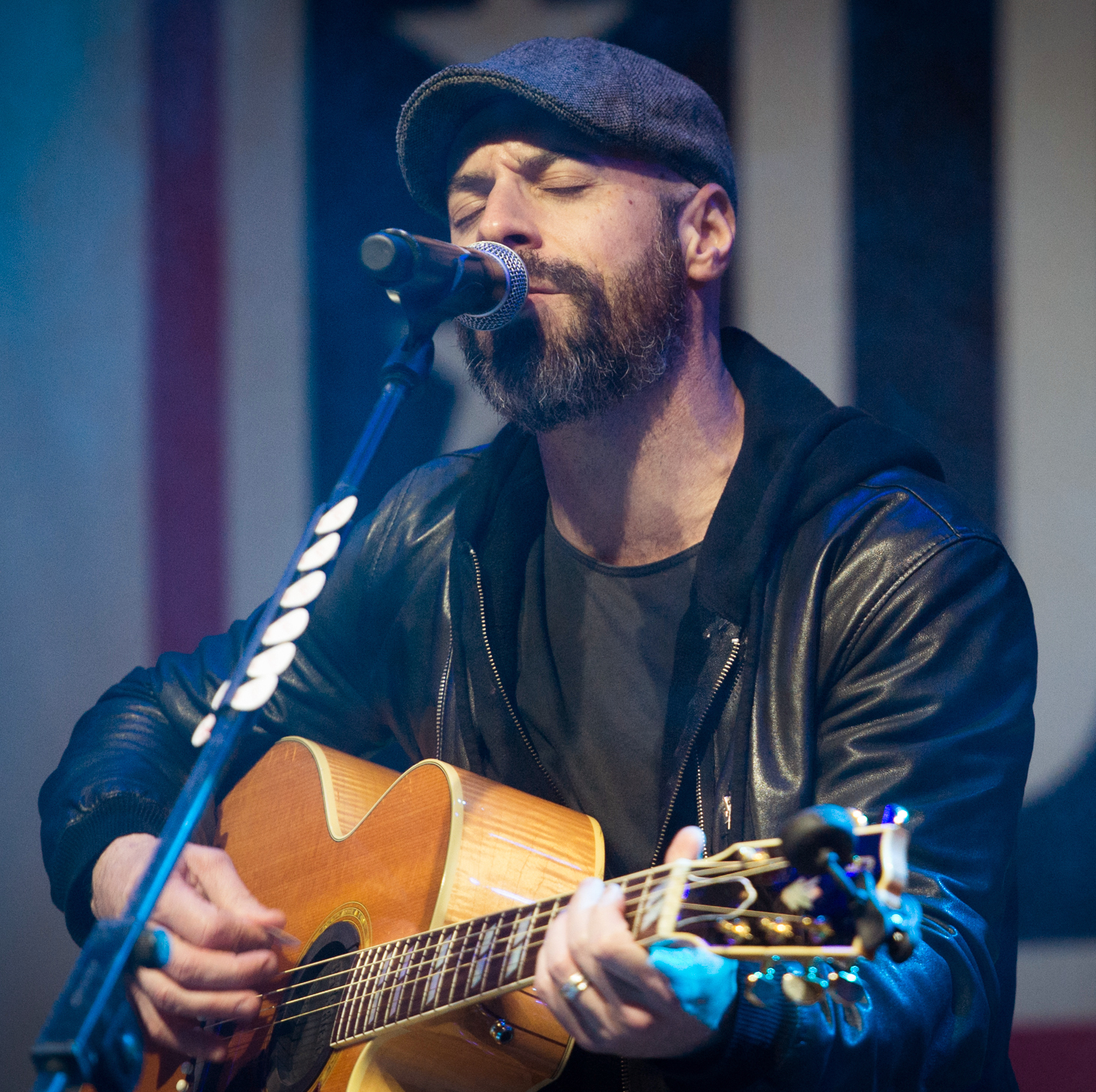
Chris Daughtry

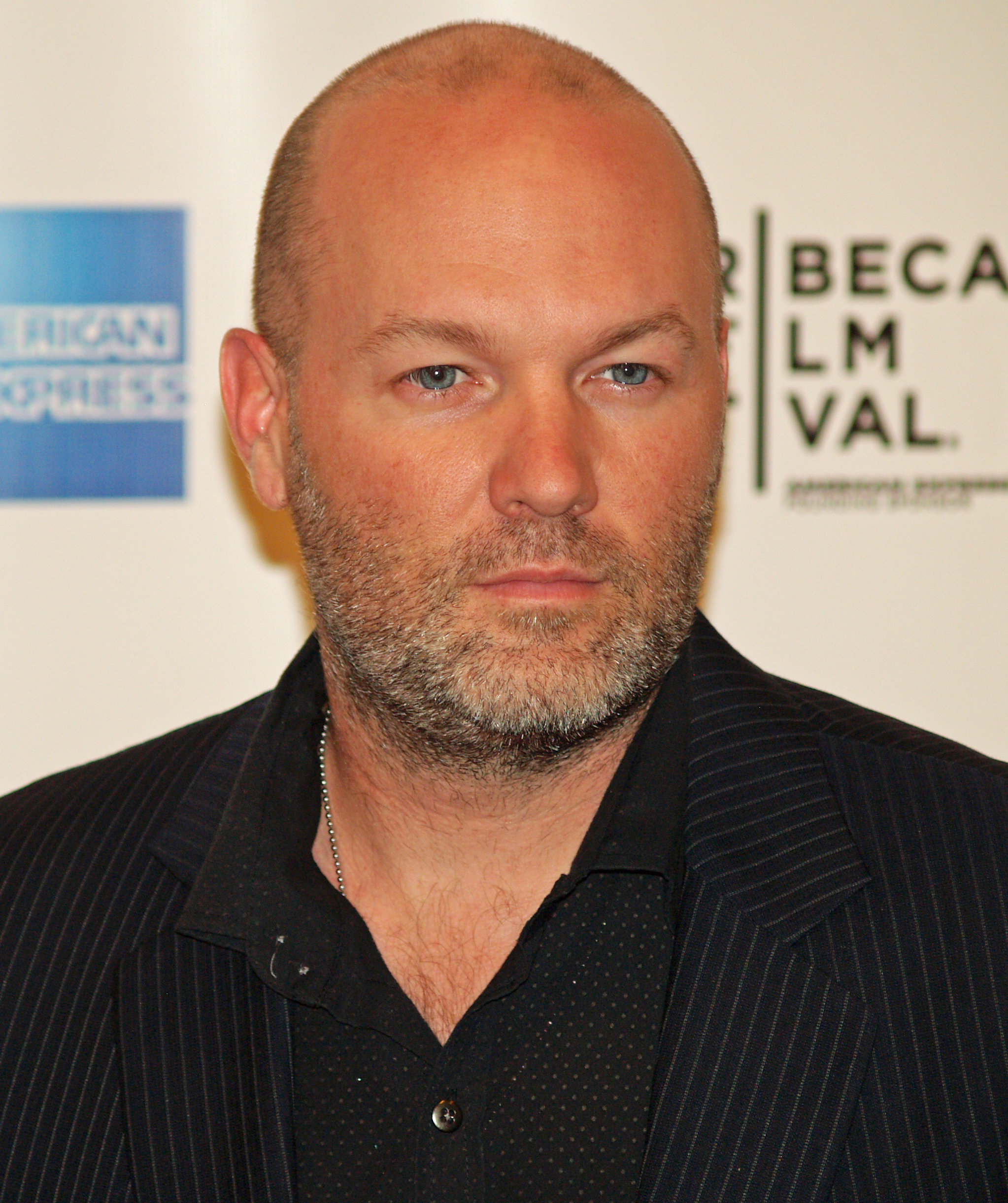
Fred Durst

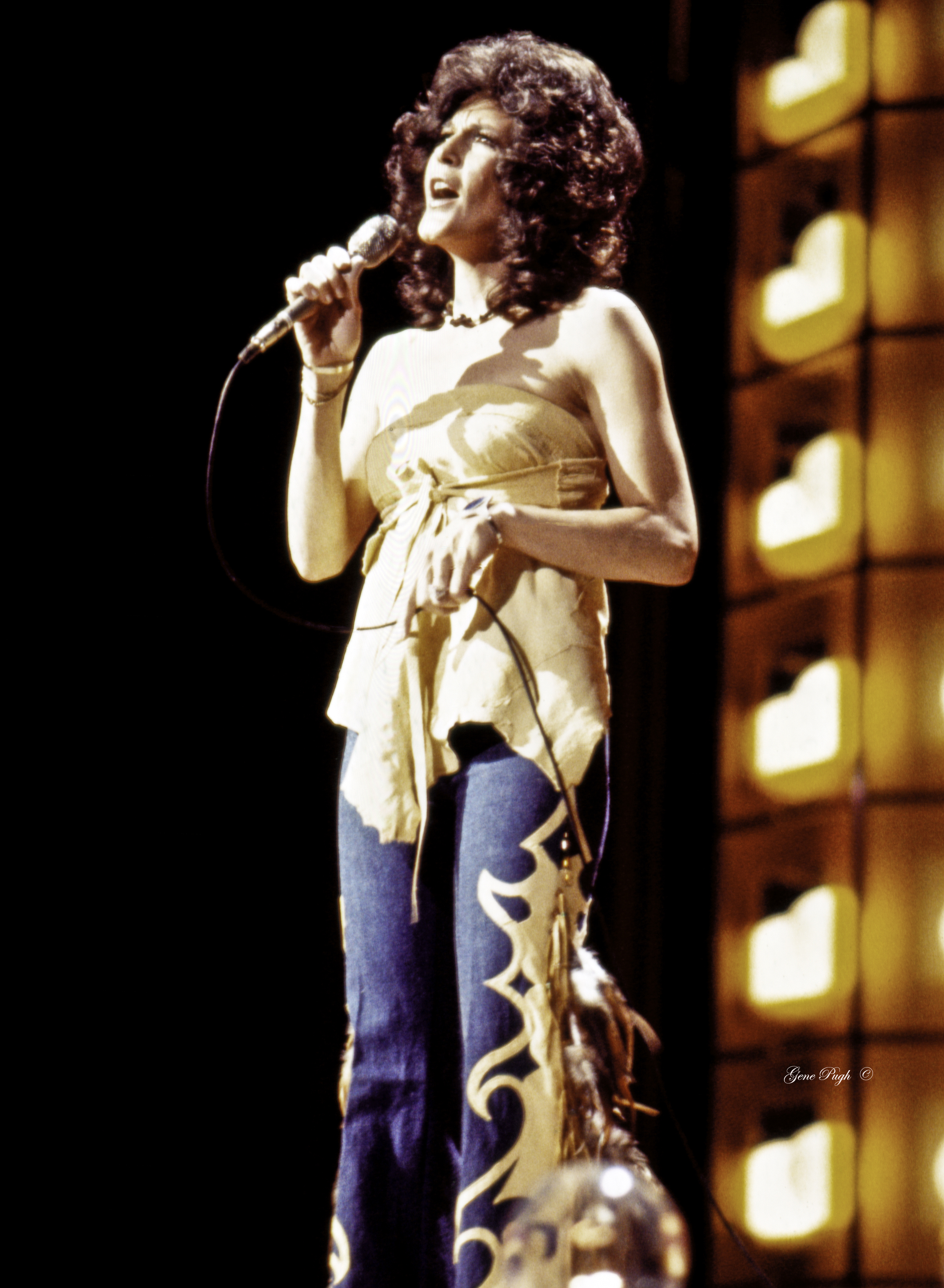
Donna Fargo

- Ryan Adams (born 1974), singer-songwriter (Jacksonville and Raleigh)
- Clay Aiken (born 1978), pop singer (Raleigh)
- Doug Aldrich (born 1964), guitarist (Raleigh)
- Tim Alexander (born 1965), drummer for Primus (Cherry Point)
- Gerald Alston (born 1951), of R&B group Gerald Alston & The Manhattans (Henderson)
- Tori Amos (born 1963), singer (Newton)
- Sunshine Anderson (born 1974), R&B and soul singer-songwriter (Winston-Salem and Charlotte)
- Seth Avett (born 1980), singer-songwriter, artist (Concord)
- Scott Avett (born 1976), singer-songwriter, artist (Concord)
- Nicholas William Bailey (born 1980), film and television composer, singer-songwriter (New Bern)
- Etta Baker (1913–2006), Piedmont blues guitarist (Morganton)
- Bessie Banks (born 1938), singer (born Bessie White) (New Bern)
- Warren Barfield (born 1979), Christian musician (Goldsboro)
- Fantasia Barrino (1984–), singer, American Idol Season 3 winner (High Point)
- Riley Baugus (born 1965), old-time Appalachian musician (Walkertown)
- Priscilla Block (born 1995), country music singer-songwriter (Raleigh)
- B.o.B (born 1988), rapper and record producer (Winston-Salem)
- Margie Bowes (1941–2020), country music singer (Roxboro)
- Alicia Bridges (born 1953), disco singer (Lawndale)
- Chuck Brown (1936–2012), "godfather of go-go" (Gaston)
- Nappy Brown (1922–2008), R&B singer (Charlotte)
- Shirley Caesar (born 1938), singer (Durham)
- Jason Michael Carroll (born 1978), singer (Youngsville)
- Spencer Chamberlain (born 1983), singer-songwriter (Chapel Hill)
- Travis Cherry (born 1975), music producer (Raleigh)
- Eric Church (born 1977), country singer-songwriter (Granite Falls)
- George Clinton (born 1941), funk musician (Kannapolis)
- John Coltrane (1926–1967), jazz musician (Hamlet)
- J. Cole (born 1985), rapper (Fayetteville)
- Luke Combs (born 1990), country music singer (Asheville)
- Cordae (born 1997), rapper (Raleigh)
- Elizabeth Cotten (1895–1987), folk and blues singer-songwriter (Carrboro)
- Bucky Covington (born 1977), singer (Rockingham)
- DaBaby (born 1991), rapper (Charlotte)
- Charlie Daniels (1936–2020), singer-songwriter (Wilmington)
- Chris Daughtry (born 1979), singer (Roanoke Rapids and Greensboro)
- Betty Davis (1944–2022), funk singer (Durham)
- Tommy DeCarlo (born 1965), singer for Boston (Charlotte)
- Patrick Douthit (a.k.a. 9th Wonder) (born 1975), hip-hop producer (Winston-Salem)
- Jermaine Dupri (born 1972), rap artist and record producer (Asheville)
- Fred Durst (born 1970), frontman for Limp Bizkit; grew up and graduated high school in NC (Gastonia)
- Mitch Easter (born 1954), singer-songwriter, producer (R.E.M.), frontman for Let's Active (Winston-Salem)
- Donna Fargo (born 1945), singer-songwriter (Mount Airy)
- Tal Farlow (1921–1998), jazz guitarist (Greensboro)
- Roberta Flack (1937–2025), Grammy-winning singer (Black Mountain)
- Ben Folds (born 1966), singer-songwriter (Winston-Salem and Chapel Hill)
- Audley Freed, guitarist, songwriter
- Nnenna Freelon (born 1964), six-time Grammy-nominated jazz singer (Durham)
- Blind Boy Fuller (1908–1941), blues guitarist and singer (Wadesboro)
- Alfreda Gerald, opera singer and classical soloist (Morganton)
- Don Gibson (1928–2003), country singer-songwriter, Country Music Hall of Fame (Shelby)
- Rhiannon Giddens (born 1977), singer-songwriter, multi-instrumentalist, co-founder of the Carolina Chocolate Drops (Greensboro)

H–Z

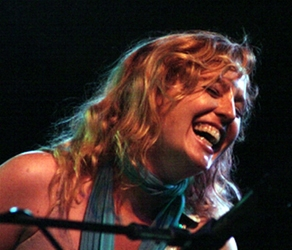
Tift Merritt

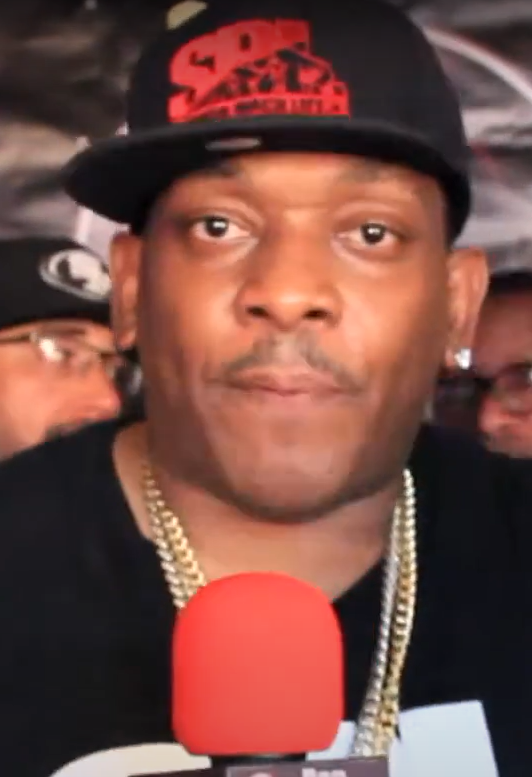
Petey Pablo

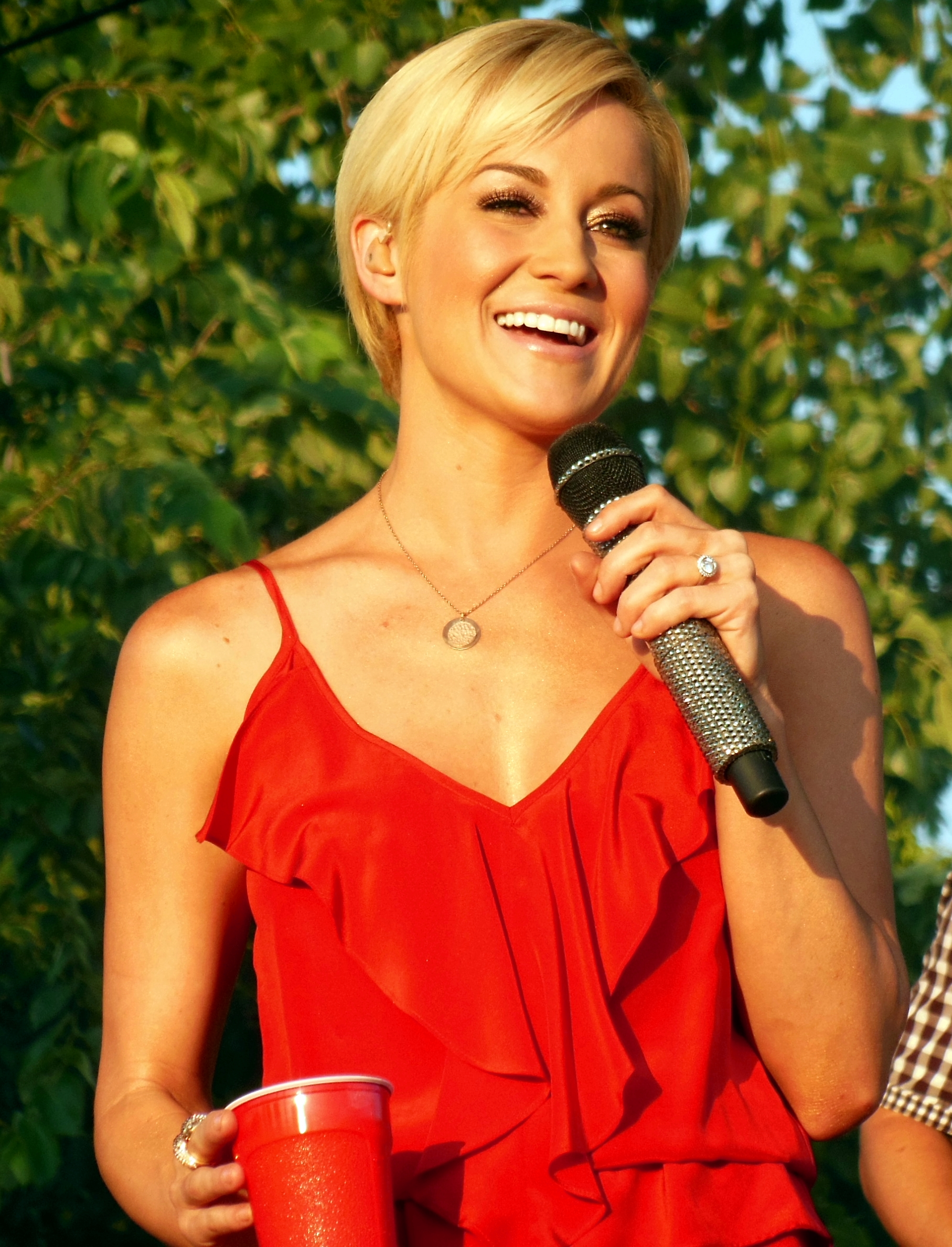
Kellie Pickler

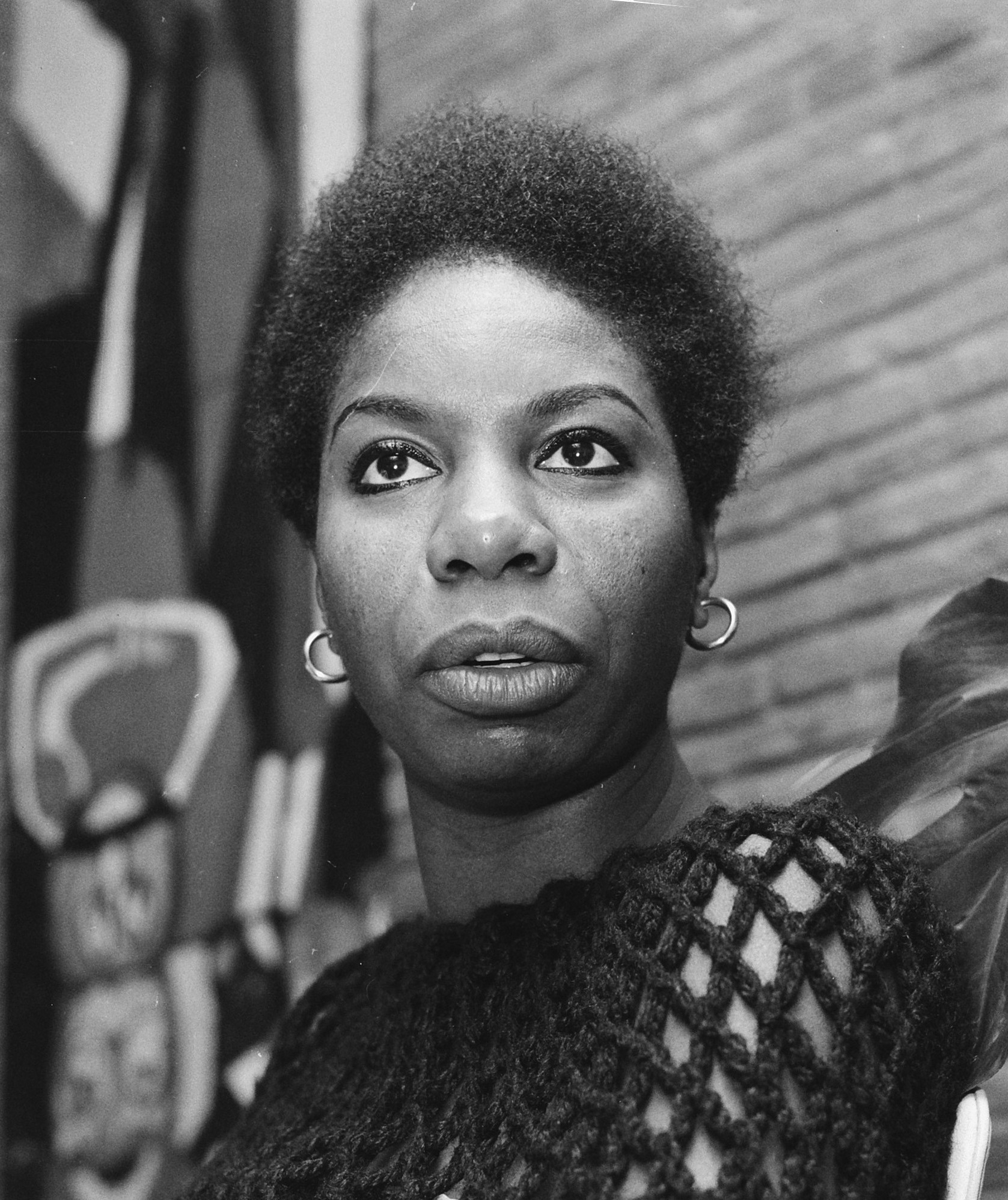
Nina Simone

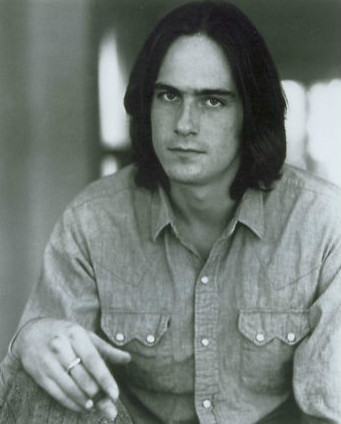
James Taylor

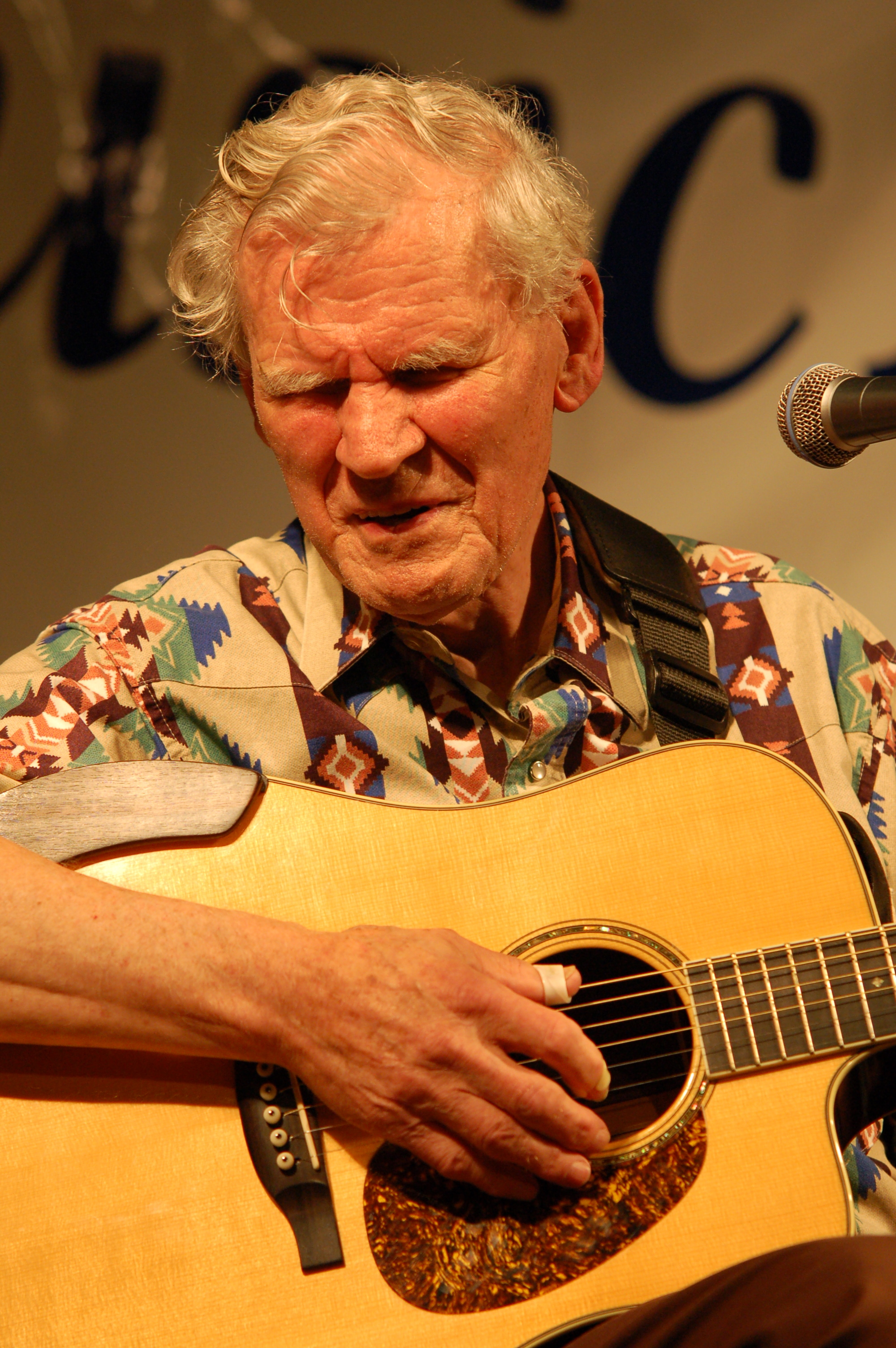
Doc Watson

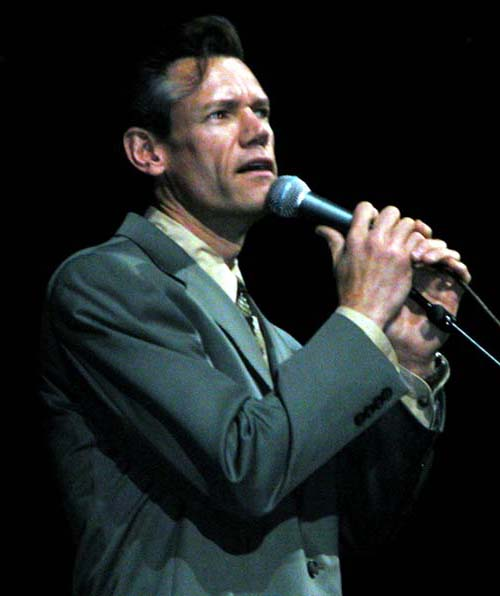
Randy Travis

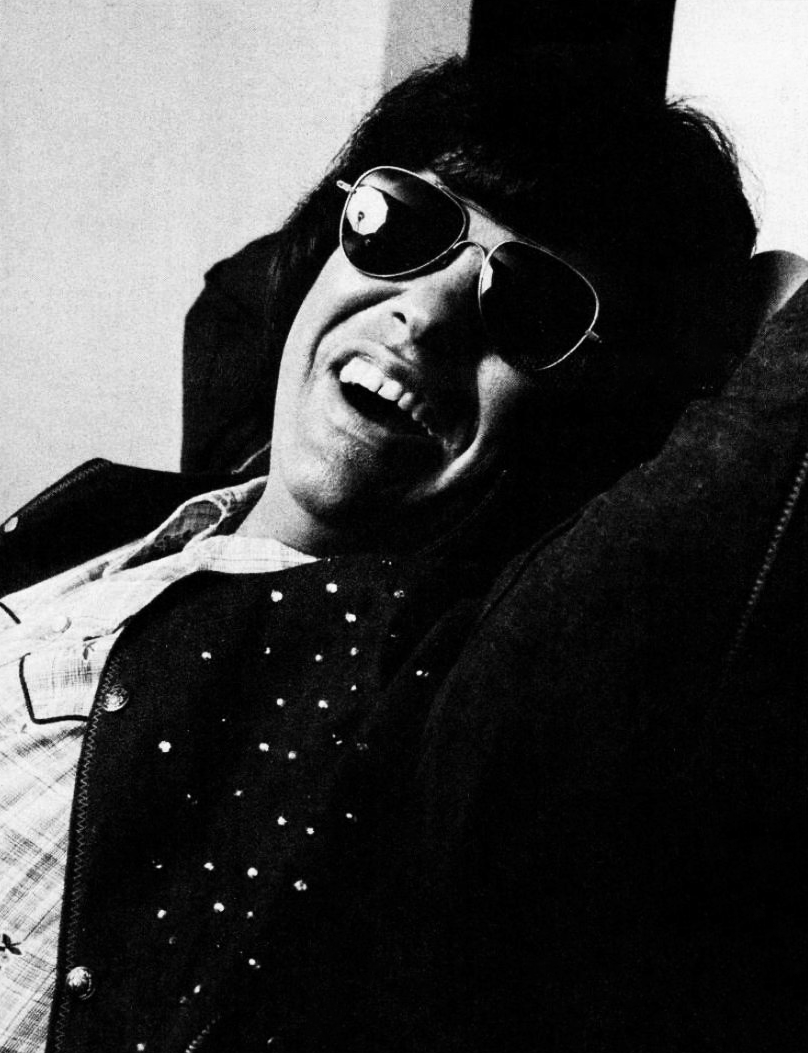
Ronnie Milsap

- Anthony Hamilton (born 1971), soul artist (Charlotte)
- George Hamilton IV (1937–2014), country singer (Winston-Salem)
- Wilbert Harrison (1929–1994), singer, pianist (Charlotte)
- Warren Haynes (born 1960), Southern rock and blues singer, guitarist for Gov't Mule and The Allman Brothers Band (Asheville)
- Percy Heath (1923–2005), jazz bassist, Modern Jazz Quartet (Wilmington)
- Jimmy Herring (born 1962), guitarist for Widespread Panic (Fayetteville)
- Byron Hill (born 1953), country songwriter (Winston-Salem)
- Michael Houser (1962–2002), guitarist, founding member of Widespread Panic (Boone)
- Maria Howell (born 1962), singer (Gastonia)
- Stonewall Jackson (1932–2021), country singer and musician (Tabor City)
- Caleb Johnson (born 1991), singer and American Idol Season 13 winner (Asheville)
- Randy Jones (born 1953), singer of Village People (Raleigh)
- "K-Ci" and "JoJo" Hailey (born 1969 and 1971 respectively), R&B duo of R&B group Jodeci (Charlotte)
- Noa Kalos, electronic musician (Asheville)
- Hal Kemp (1904–1940), bandleader, composer, arranger with two number one songs (Chapel Hill)
- Cheyenne Kimball (born 1990), singer-songwriter, guitarist, mandolinist (Wilmington)
- Ben E. King (1938–2015), singer-songwriter (Henderson)
- Jim Lauderdale (born 1957), bluegrass and country singer-songwriter (Troutman)
- ZaZa Maree, singer, songwriter, and music producer (Greenville)
- Del McCoury (born 1939), bluegrass musician (Bakersville)
- Scotty McCreery (born 1993), country singer and American Idol Season 10 winner (Garner)
- Clyde McPhatter (1932–1972), soul/R&B singer (Durham)
- Tift Merritt (born 1975), singer-songwriter, musician (Raleigh)
- Ronnie Milsap (born 1946), country singer-songwriter (Robbinsville)
- Dave Moody (born 1962), Dove Award-winning producer, songwriter, filmmaker (Fayetteville)
- Thelonious Monk (1917–1982), jazz composer, pianist (Rocky Mount)
- Britt Nicole, Christian musician (Kannapolis)
- Oliver (born William Oliver Swofford) (1945–2000), singer (North Wilkesboro)
- Petey Pablo (born 1978), rap artist (Greenville)
- Maceo Parker (born 1943), songwriter, musician (Kinston)
- Phonte (born 1978), rapper/singer (Greensboro / Durham)
- Kellie Pickler (born 1986), singer, American Idol contestant (Albemarle)
- Charlie Poole (1892–1931), old-time musician, leader of the North Carolina Ramblers (Randolph County / Spray (now Eden))
- Neil Pope (born 1978), gospel singer (Asheboro)
- Prettifun (born 2005), rapper (Charlotte)
- Rapsody (born 1983), rapper (Snow Hill)
- Edward Wiley Ray (1926–2026), music executive, songwriter (Franklin)
- Del Reeves (1934–2007), country singer-songwriter (Sparta)
- Ola Belle Reed (1916–2002), bluegrass/old-time musician (Lansing)
- Calvin Richardson (born 1976), R&B singer-songwriter (Monroe, Union County)
- Max Roach (1924–2007), jazz drummer (Newland Township, Pasquotank County)
- Porter Robinson (born 1992), electronic dance musician (Chapel Hill)
- Earl Scruggs (1924–2012), bluegrass banjo player (Shelby)
- William Self (1906–1998), organist and choirmaster (Lenoir)
- Caroline Shaw (born 1982), composer, Pulitzer Prize winner (Greenville)
- Woody Shaw (1944–1989), trumpeter, DownBeat Jazz Hall of Fame (Laurinburg)
- Nina Simone (1933–2003), singer, Grammy Award Hall of Fame (Tryon)
- Arthur Smith (1921–2014), composer, entertainer, producer (Charlotte)
- Chloe Smith, singer-songwriter, multi-instrumentalist for Rising Appalachia (Atlanta-born; Asheville-based)
- Leah Song, singer-songwriter, multi-instrumentalist, frontwoman for Rising Appalachia (Atlanta-born; Asheville-based)
- Peter Stroud, guitarist, rock musician; co-founder of 65amps (Greensboro)
- Supastition (born 1976), hip-hop artist (Greenville)
- Billy Taylor (1921–2010), jazz pianist, educator (Greenville)
- James Taylor (born 1948), singer-songwriter in Rock and Roll Hall of Fame (Chapel Hill)
- The-Dream, real name Terius Nash, R&B singer, writer, producer (Rockingham)
- TiaCorine (born 1993), rapper (Winston-Salem)
- Randy Travis (born 1959), singer in Country Music Hall of Fame (Marshville)
- Loudon Wainwright III (born 1946), songwriter, folk singer, humorist (Chapel Hill)
- Doc Watson (1923–2012), folk guitarist (Deep Gap)
- Wednesday 13 (born 1976), rock musician (Lexington)
- Link Wray (1929–2005), guitarist, rock musician, songwriter (Dunn)
- George Younce (1930–2005), gospel singer (Patterson)

== Sportspeople ==
A–B

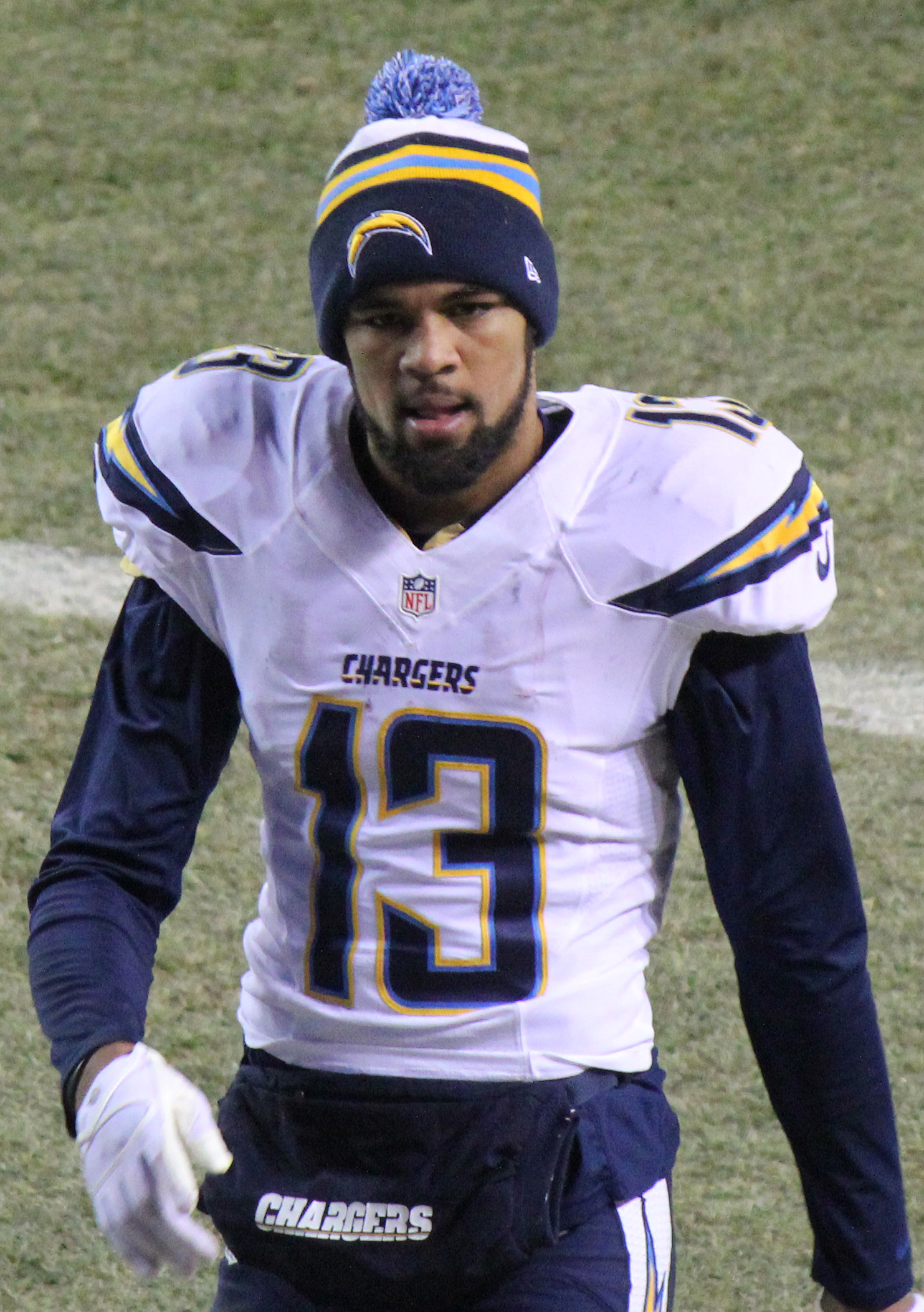
Keenan Allen

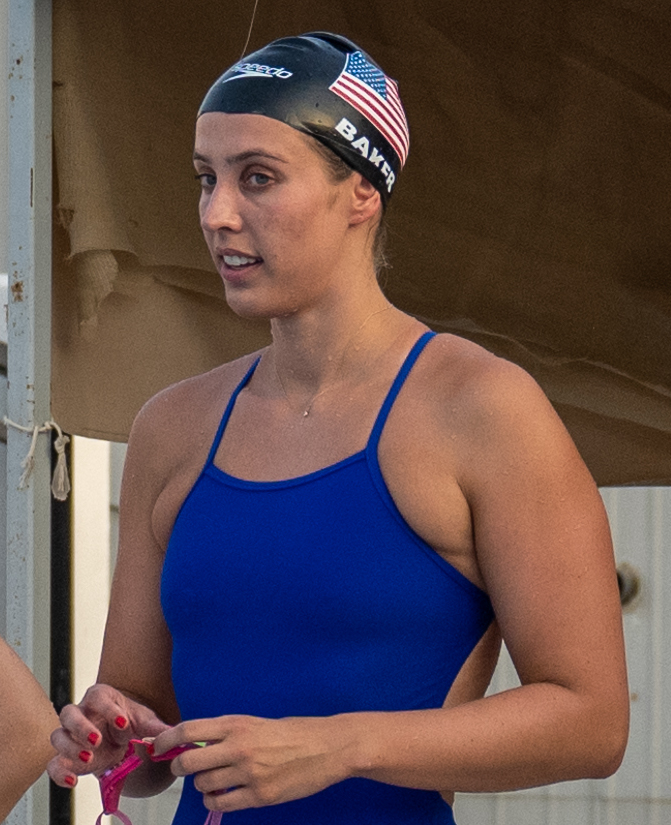
Kathleen Baker

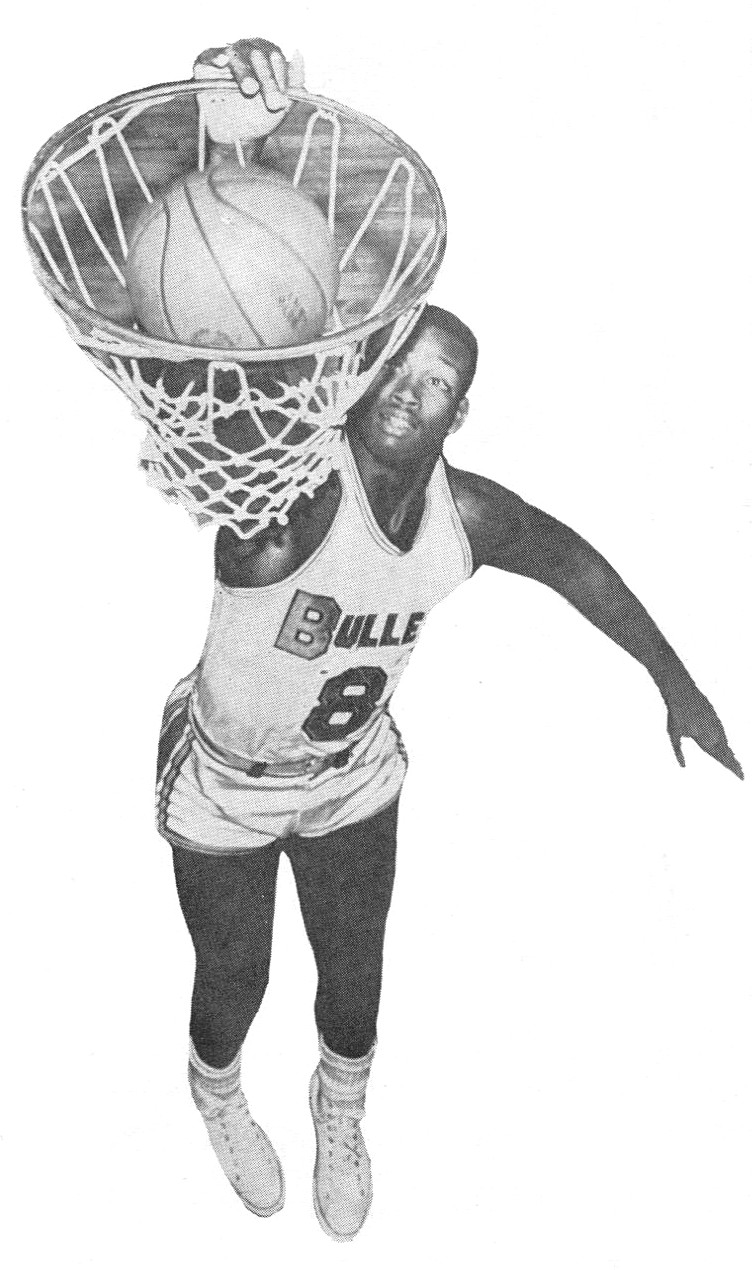
Walt Bellamy

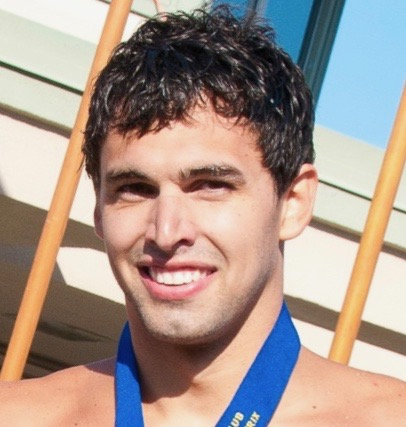
Ricky Berens

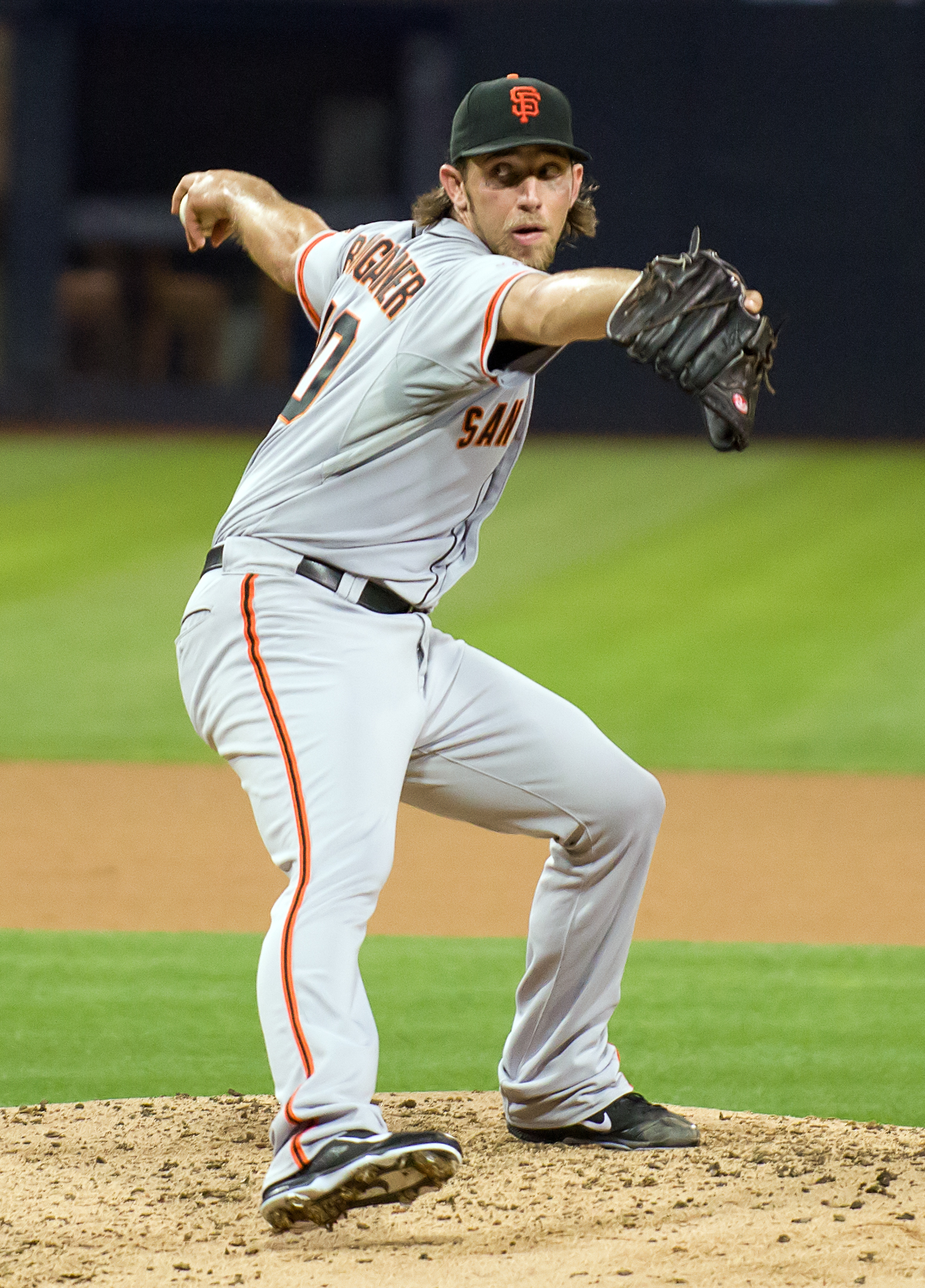
Madison Bumgarner

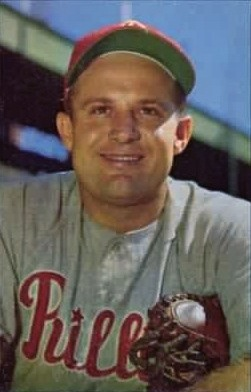
Smoky Burgess

- Dustin Ackley (born 1988), second baseman and outfielder for New York Yankees (Winston-Salem)
- Sam Adams (born 1946), professional golfer who played on PGA Tour (Boone)
- Sam Aiken (born 1980), wide receiver; Buffalo Bills (2003–07); New England Patriots (2008–10) (Warsaw)
- Walt Aikens (born 1991), cornerback and free safety for Miami Dolphins (Charlotte)
- Dwayne Allen (born 1990), tight end for Indianapolis Colts (Fayetteville)
- Johnny Allen (1904–1959), MLB pitcher, All-Star and World Series champion with the New York Yankees (Lenoir)
- Kadeem Allen (born 1993), basketball player in the NBA and currently for Hapoel Haifa in the Israeli Basketball Premier League
- Keenan Allen (born 1992), wide receiver for San Diego Chargers (Greensboro)
- Jaire Alexander (born 1997), NFL cornerback for the Green Bay Packers (Charlotte)
- James Anderson (born 1983), linebacker for Carolina Panthers (Roanoke Rapids)
- Stephone Anthony (born 1992), linebacker for New Orleans Saints (Polkton)
- Luke Appling (1907–1991), Baseball Hall of Fame shortstop for the Chicago White Sox (High Point)
- Chris Archer (born 1988), pitcher for Tampa Bay Rays (Clayton)
- Darrell Armstrong (born 1968), NBA point guard, assistant coach for Dallas Mavericks (Gastonia)
- Shawn Armstrong (born 1990), relief pitcher for Cleveland Indians (Bridgeton)
- J. J. Arrington (born 1983), pro football player (Rocky Mount)
- Kathleen Baker (born 1997), Olympic gold and silver medalist swimmer (Winston-Salem)
- Brooks Baldwin (born 2000), MLB infielder (Whiteville)
- Scott Bankhead (born 1963), former MLB pitcher (Raleigh)
- Billy Ray Barnes (born 1935), NFL player 1957–66 for Philadelphia Eagles, Washington Redskins, and Minnesota Vikings; 3-time Pro Bowl (Landis)
- Brian Barnes (born 1967), MLB pitcher for Montreal Expos, Cleveland Indians, Los Angeles Dodgers (Roanoke Rapids)
- Darrius Barnes (born 1986), Major League Soccer player (Raleigh)
- Rick Barnes (born 1954), college basketball coach (Hickory)
- Bryan Battle (born 1994), UFC fighter (Charlotte)
- Jim Beatty (born 1934), track and field athlete, first person to break 4-minute barrier on an indoor track (Charlotte)
- Bobby Bell (born 1940), Pro Football Hall of Fame linebacker and defensive end for Kansas City Chiefs (Shelby)
- Walt Bellamy (1938–2013), basketball player, NBA Hall of Fame (New Bern)
- Ricky Berens (born 1988), two-time Olympic gold medalist in swimming (Charlotte)
- Heather Bergsma (born 1989), Olympic speed skater, earned a bronze medal (High Point)
- Brenton Bersin (born 1990), wide receiver for Carolina Panthers (Charlotte)
- Henry Bibby (born 1949), basketball player for 3-time national champion UCLA, NBA player, college and pro coach (Franklinton)
- Eddie Biedenbach (born 1945), basketball player for NBA's Los Angeles Lakers, Phoenix Suns, and for North Carolina State University, NC Sports Hall of Fame (Wrightsville Beach)
- Ryan Blaney (born 1993), NASCAR driver (High Point)
- Arthur Bluethenthal (1891–1918), college football player and World War I pilot (Wilmington)
- Jared Boll (born 1986), NHL player (Charlotte)
- Stephen Bowen (born 1984), defensive end for New York Jets (Holly Ridge)
- Jim Boyd (1930–1997), Olympic gold medalist boxer at light heavyweight at the 1956 Summer Olympics (Rocky Mount)
- Garrett Bradbury (born 1995), center for the Minnesota Vikings (Charlotte)
- Hal Bradley (1913–1981), football player for NFL's Washington Redskins and Chicago Cardinals (Winston-Salem)
- Louis Breeden, defensive back with Cincinnati Bengals (1978–1987)
- Kidd Brewer (1908–1991), college football coach and athletics administrator (Winston-Salem)
- Andre Brown (born 1986), fullback for Washington Redskins (Greenville)
- Dyami Brown (born 1999), football player
- Jason Brown (born 1983), center for St. Louis Rams (Henderson)
- Logan Brown (born 1998), NHL player (Raleigh)
- Ted Brown (born 1957), former NFL running back, member of the College Football Hall of Fame (High Point)
- Derek Brunson (born 1984), UFC fighter (Wilmington)
- Madison Bumgarner (born 1989), MLB pitcher, 3-time World Series champion, 2014 World Series MVP (Hudson)
- Smoky Burgess (1927–1991), Major League Baseball player, 9-time All-Star (Caroleen)
- Juston Burris (born 1993), NFL safety (Raleigh)
- Paul Burris (1923–1999), MLB catcher (Hickory)
- Josh Bush (born 1989), free safety for Denver Broncos (Burlington)
- Crezdon Butler (born 1987), cornerback for Pittsburgh Steelers (Asheville)
- Dremiel Byers (born 1974), Greco-Roman wrestler, World Champion and member of two Olympic teams (Kings Mountain)
- William Byron (born 1997), NASCAR driver (Charlotte)

C–G

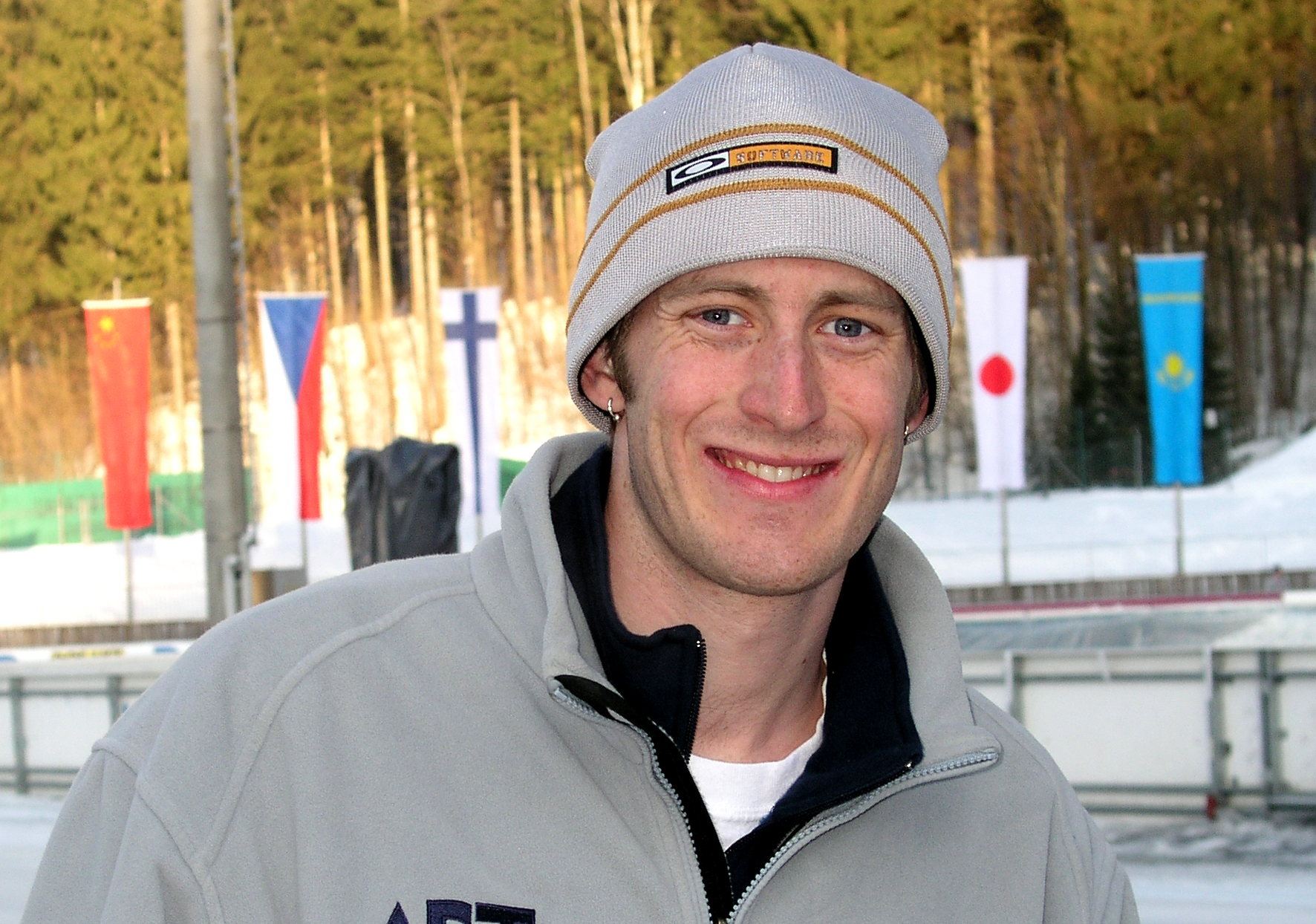
Joey Cheek

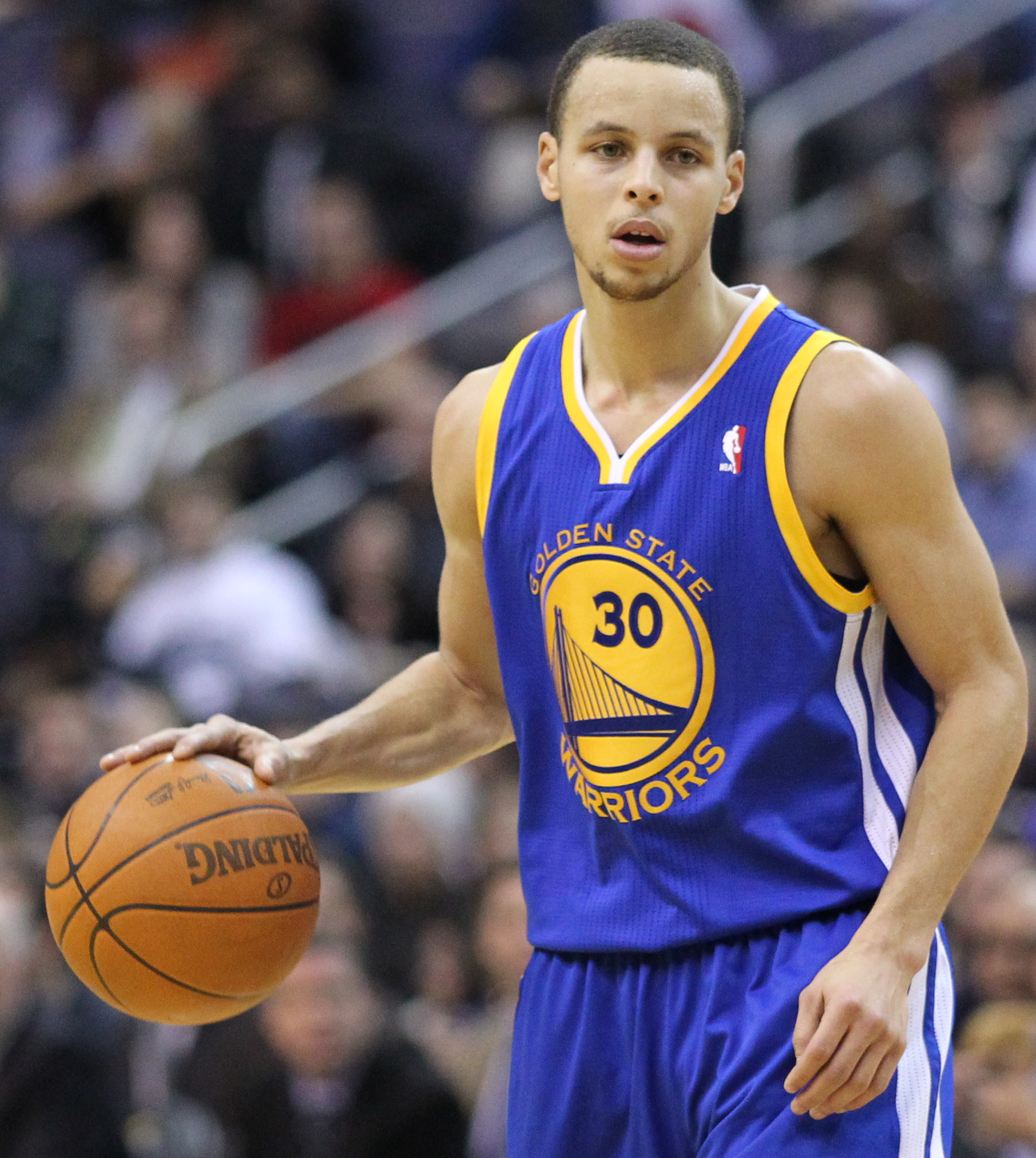
Stephen Curry

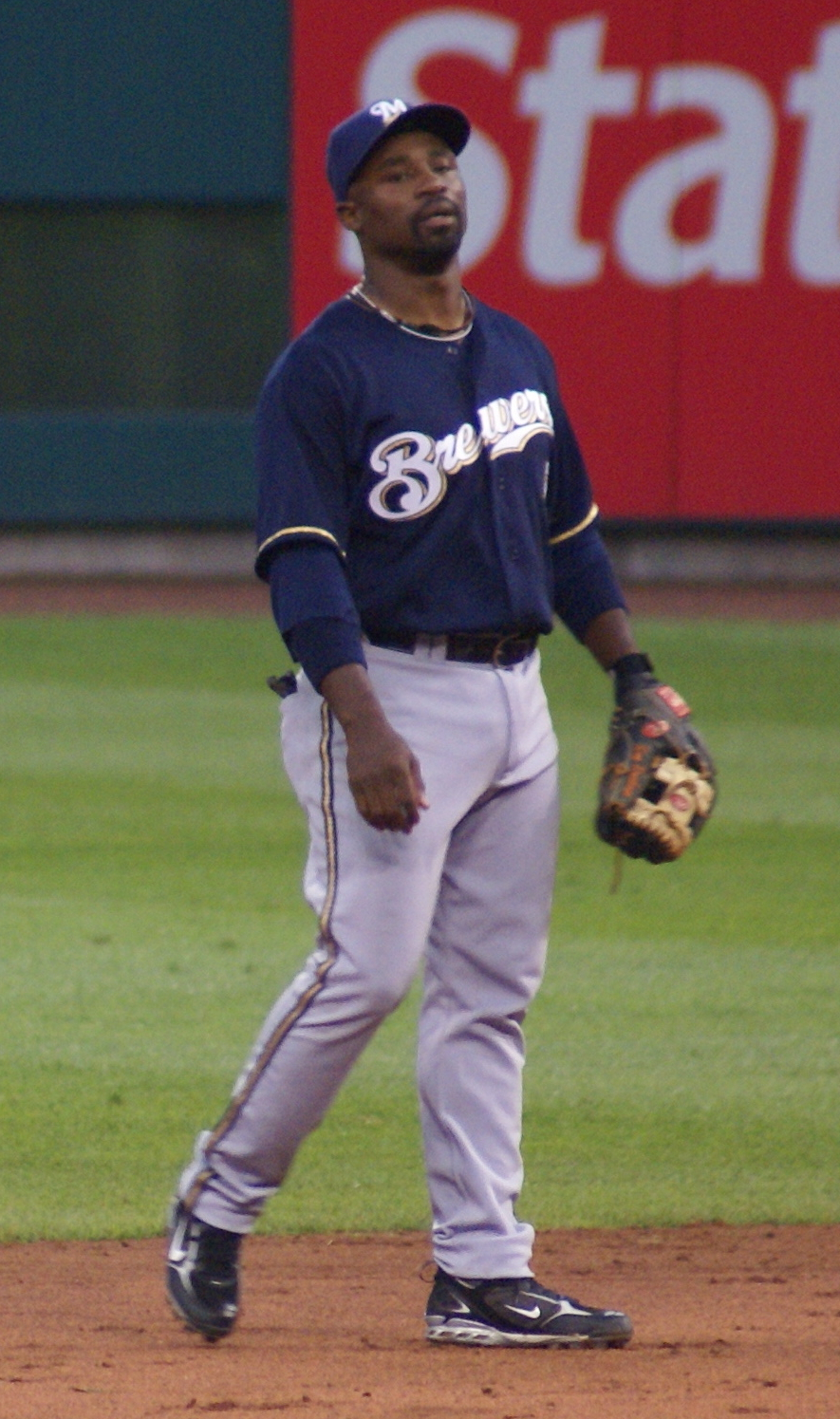
Ray Durham

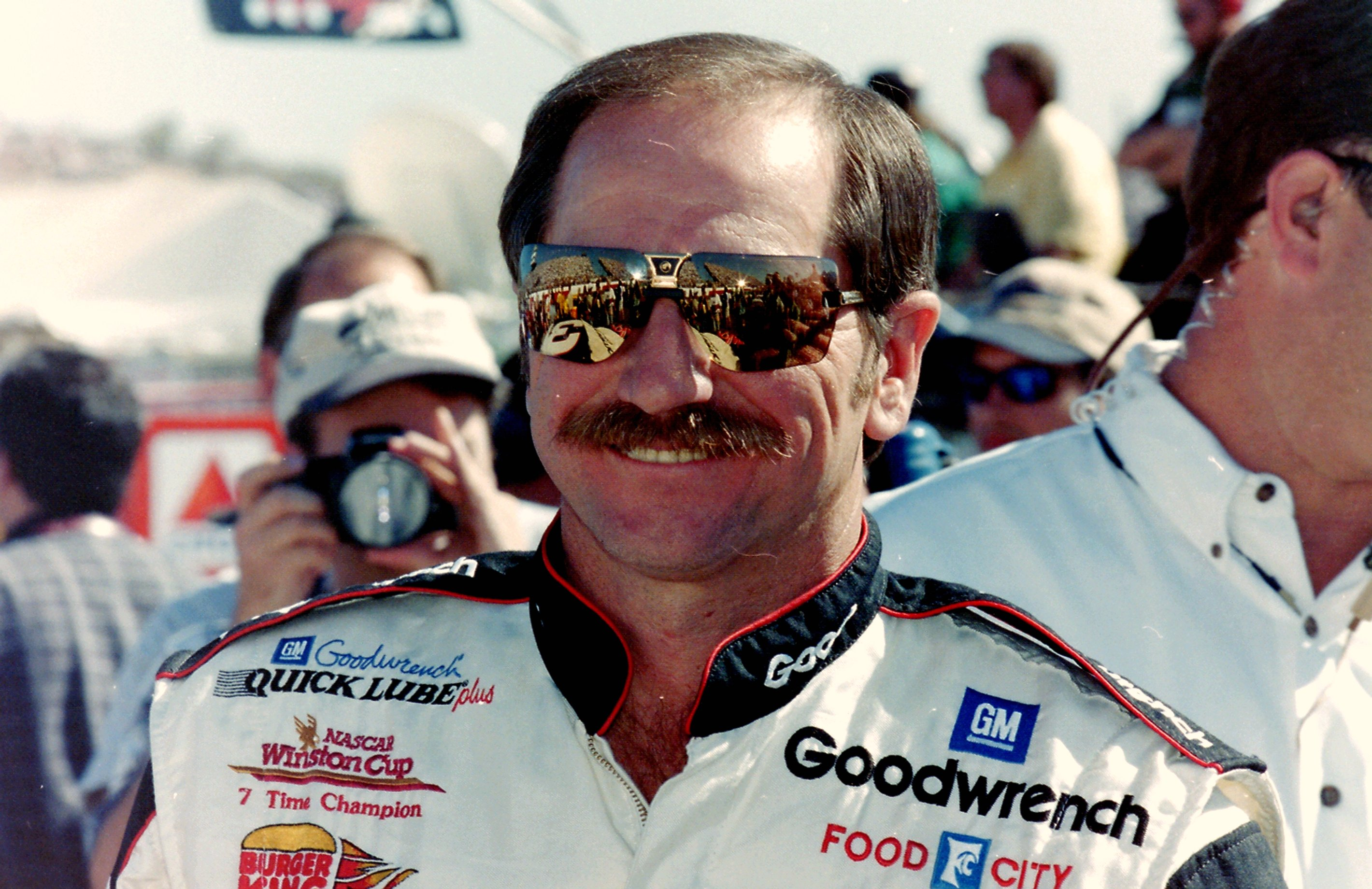
Dale Earnhardt

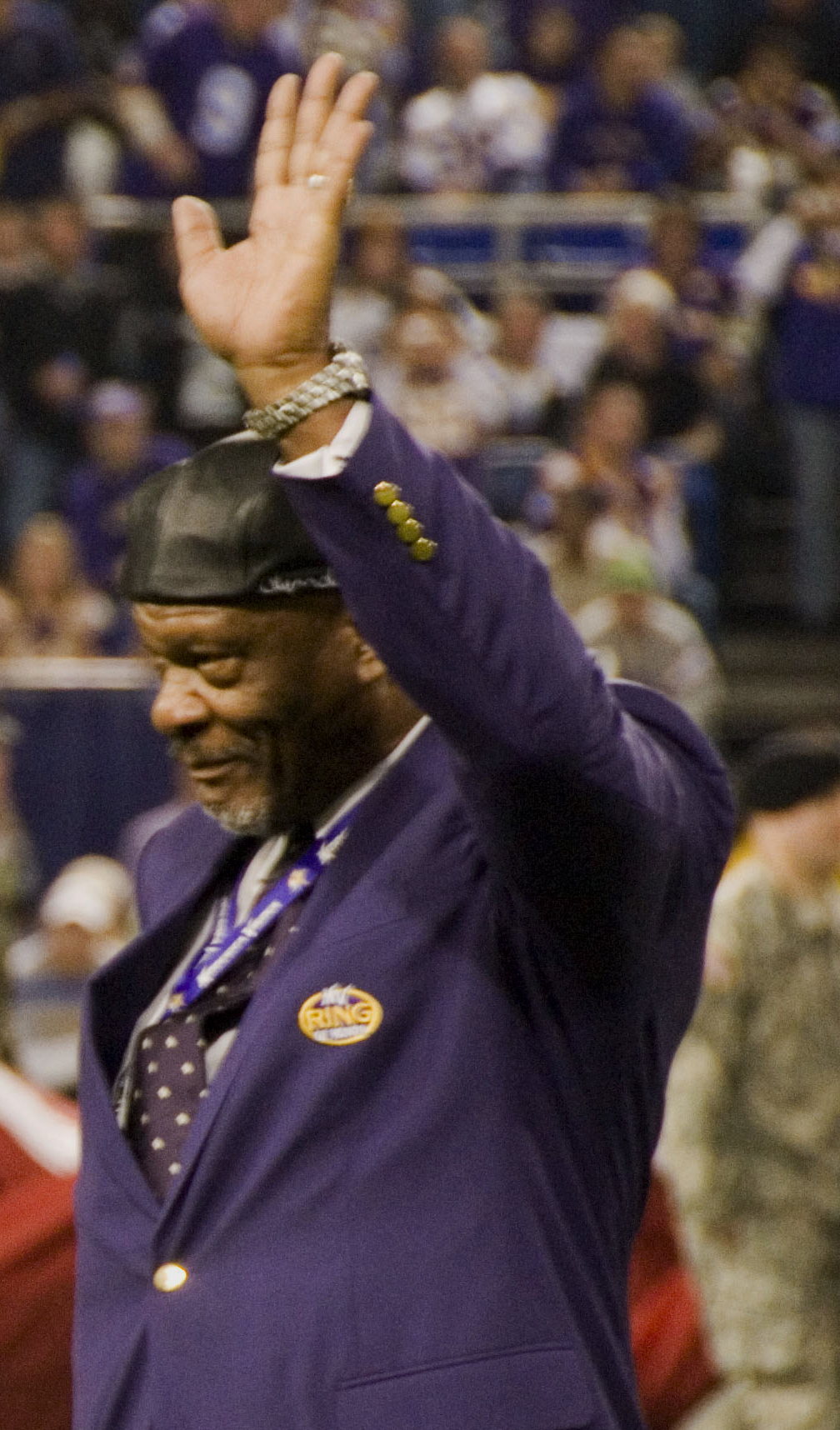
Carl Eller

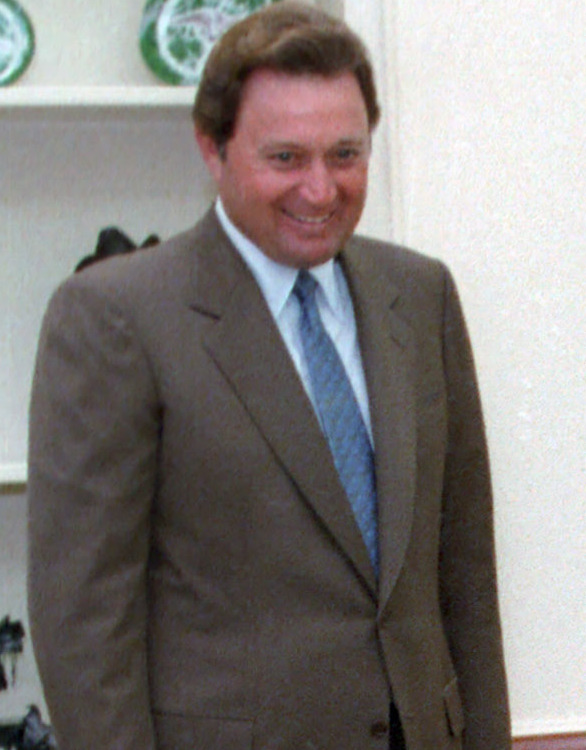
Raymond Floyd

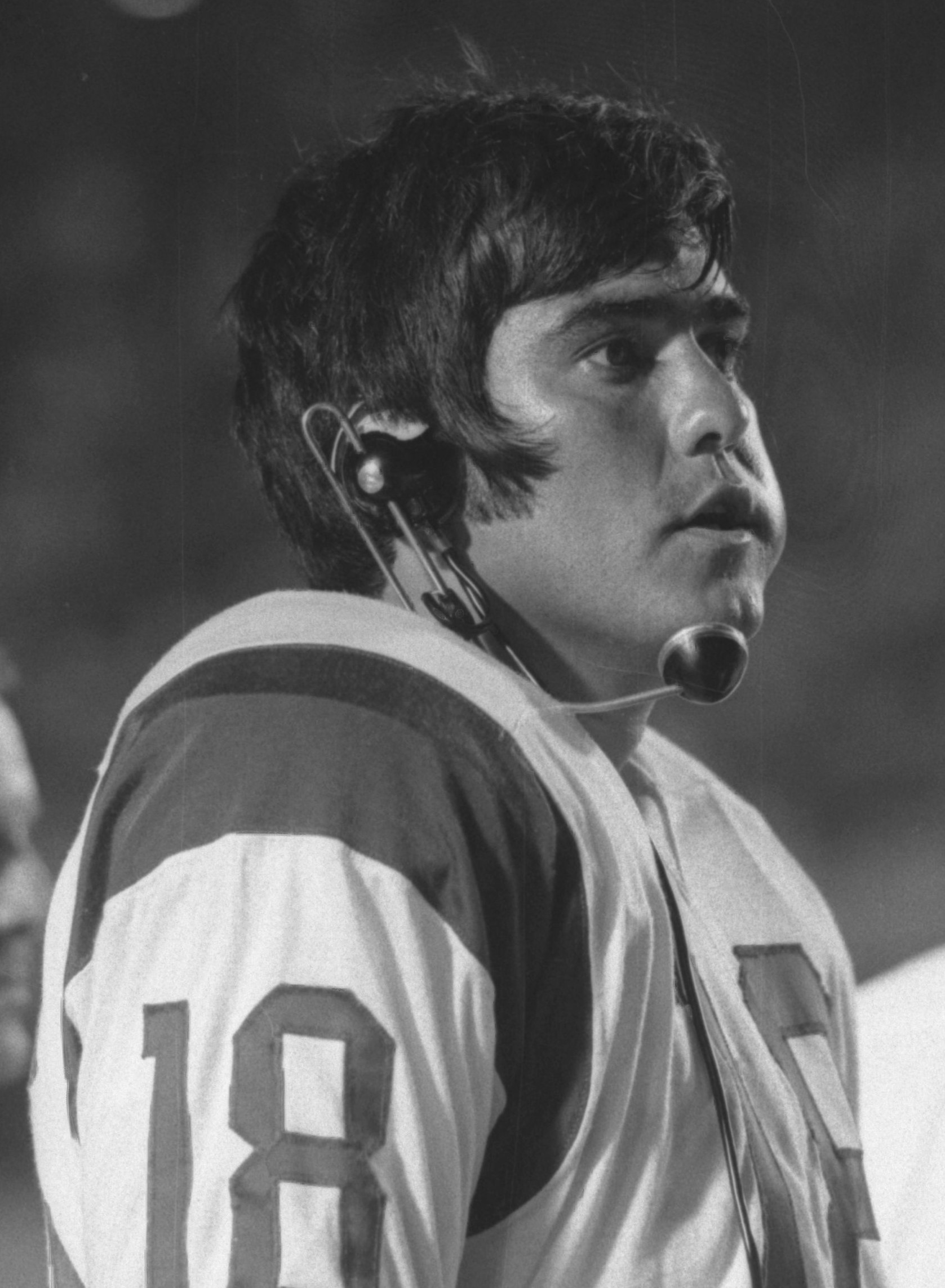
Roman Gabriel

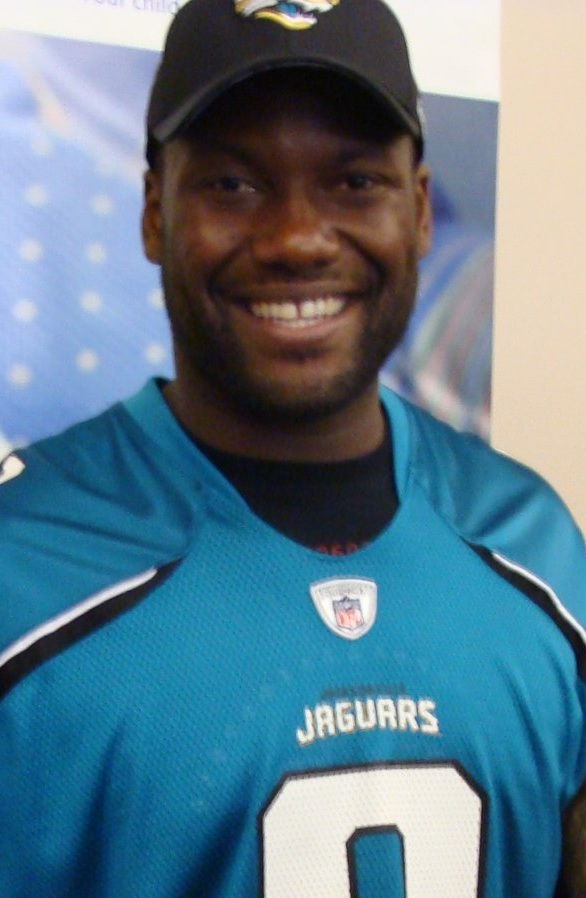
David Garrard

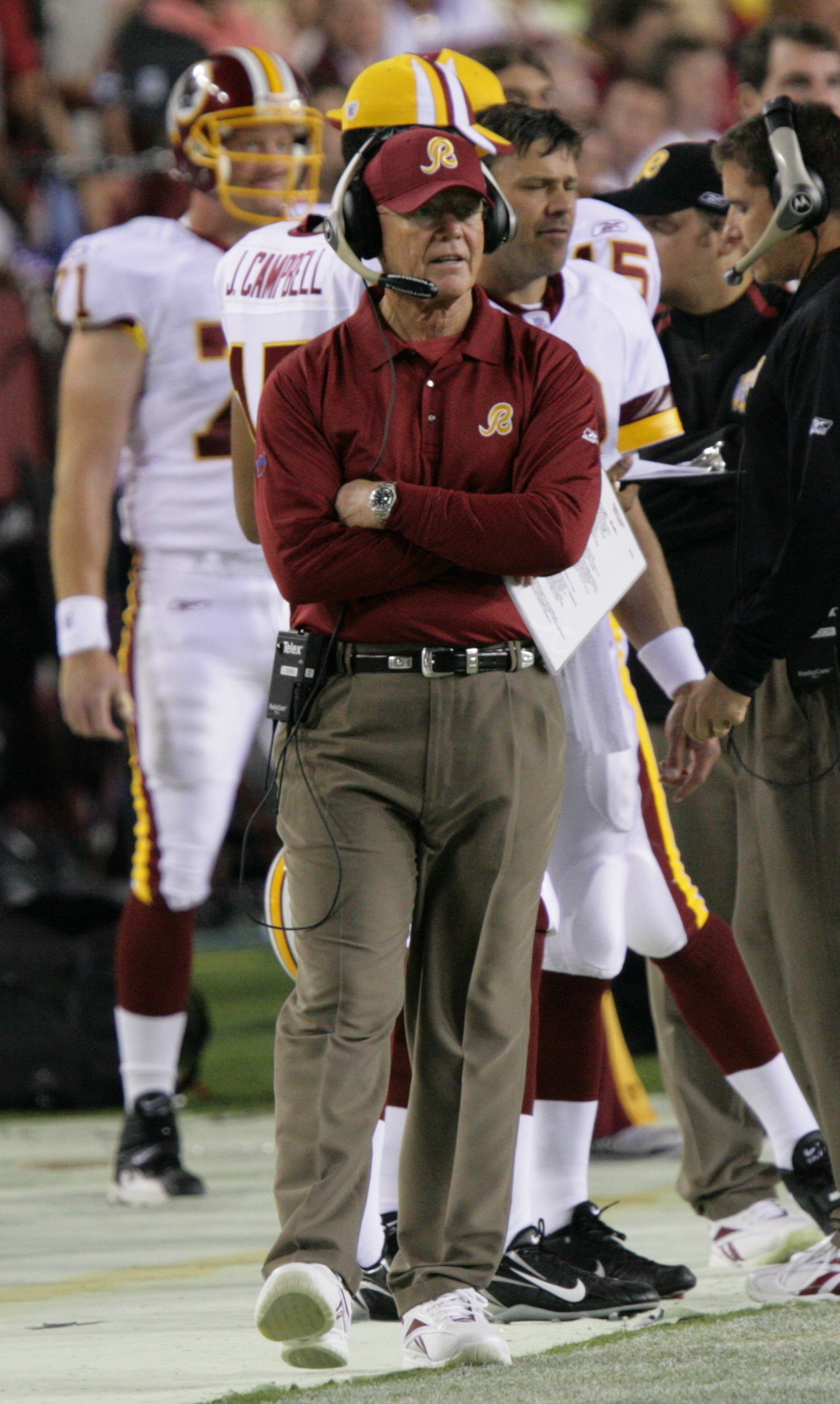
Joe Gibbs

- Brian Canter (born 1987), professional bull rider on Professional Bull Riders Built Ford Tough Series tour (Randleman)
- Chris Canty (born 1982), defensive lineman for the New York Giants (Charlotte)
- Bruce Carter (born 1988), linebacker for Tampa Bay Buccaneers (Havelock)
- Carter Capps, relief pitcher for Miami Marlins, born in Kinston
- Joey Cheek (born 1979), Olympic gold medalist speed skater (Greensboro)
- Lonnie Chisenhall (born 1988), utility player for Cleveland Indians (Newport)
- Dwight Clark (1957–2018), two-time All-Pro wide receiver for San Francisco 49ers; led 49ers to first Super Bowl appearance with a last-minute touchdown catch in 1982 NFC Championship Game (Kinston)
- Jim Cleamons (born 1949), former NBA guard, Los Angeles Lakers, Cleveland Cavaliers, and New York Knicks; assistant coach for Lakers (Lincolnton)
- Tony Cloninger (1940–2018), MLB pitcher (Cherryville)
- Tarik Cohen (born 1995), NFL running back and return specialist (Bunn)
- Jonathan Cooper (born 1990), guard for NFL's Arizona Cardinals (Wilmington)
- Terrance Copper (born 1982), wide receiver for Kansas City Chiefs (Washington)
- Charlie Cozart (1919–2004), MLB pitcher for the Boston Braves (Lenoir)
- Wade Crane (1944–2010), professional pool player (Robbinsville)
- Sam Cronin (born 1986), former Major League Soccer player (Winston-Salem)
- Alvin Crowder (1899–1972), former MLB pitcher, 2× AL wins leader (Winston-Salem)
- Alge Crumpler (born 1977), tight end for New England Patriots, selected four times for Pro Bowl (Greenville)
- Chris Culliver (born 1988), cornerback for San Francisco 49ers (Garner)
- Kenwin Cummings (born 1986), former NFL linebacker for New York Jets and Dallas Cowboys (Maxton)
- Aaron Curry (born 1986), linebacker for Seattle Seahawks (Fayetteville)
- Seth Curry (born 1990), player for Dallas Mavericks (Charlotte)
- Stephen Curry (born 1988), player for 4-time NBA champion Golden State Warriors, 2-time NBA MVP (Charlotte)
- Jack Curtis (born 1937), MLB pitcher (Granite Falls)
- Antico Dalton (born 1975), former NFL player (Eden)
- Brad Daugherty (born 1965), All-America basketball player for UNC-Chapel Hill and NBA player for the Cleveland Cavaliers; television commentator for Raycom Media (Black Mountain)
- Russell Davis (born 1975), former NFL defensive tackle (Fayetteville)
- Walter Davis (1954–2023), basketball player for UNC-Chapel Hill and NBA's Phoenix Suns; 6-time NBA All-Star (Pineville)
- Lindsay Deal (1911–1979), MLB outfielder for the Brooklyn Dodgers (Lenoir)
- Landon Dickerson (born 1998), NFL offensive lineman for the Philadelphia Eagles (Hickory)
- James L. Dickey III (born 1996), basketball player for Hapoel Haifa of the Israeli Basketball Premier League
- Rob Dillingham (born 2005), NBA player (Hickory)
- Austin Dillon (born 1990), NASCAR driver (Lewisville)
- Mike Dillon (born 1965), former NASCAR driver (Lexington)
- Ty Dillon (born 1992), NASCAR driver (Lewisville)
- Matt Dodge (born 1987), former punter for New York Giants (Morehead City)
- Ryan Dull (born 1989), relief pitcher for Oakland Athletics (Winston-Salem)
- Ray Durham (born 1971), MLB second baseman (Charlotte)
- Kony Ealy (born 1991), defensive end for Carolina Panthers (Morganton)
- Dale Earnhardt Jr. (born 1974), championship-winning NASCAR driver and protégé of his father, Dale Earnhardt Sr. (Kannapolis)
- Dale Earnhardt Sr. (1951–2001), renowned NASCAR driver nicknamed "The Intimidator" for aggressive driving style; winner of 76 NASCAR races, 7-time Cup Series champion (Kannapolis)
- Brad Edwards (born 1966), safety for Washington Redskins, made two interceptions in Super Bowl XXVI (Lumberton)
- Carl Eller (born 1942), former NFL defensive end; member of Pro Football Hall of Fame (Winston-Salem)
- Dannell Ellerbe (born 1985), linebacker for New Orleans Saints (Hamlet)
- Greg Ellis (born 1975), former NFL defensive end, 2007 Pro Bowl selection and NFL Comeback Player of the Year (Wendell)
- Ethan Evans (born 2001), NFL punter (Mount Airy)
- Je'Von Evans (born 2004), professional wrestler (Greensboro)
- Vince Evans (born 1955), 1977 Rose Bowl MVP for University of Southern California, quarterback for NFL's Los Angeles Raiders and Chicago Bears (Greensboro)
- Rick Ferrell (1905–1995), Baseball Hall of Fame catcher for Boston Red Sox Washington Senators and St Louis Browns (Durham)
- Perry Fewell (born 1962), coach for Washington Redskins (Gastonia)
- Cortland Finnegan (born 1984), cornerback for Carolina Panthers (Fayetteville)
- Spencer Fisher (born 1976), UFC fighter (Cashiers)
- Charlotte Flair (born 1986), professional wrestler (Charlotte)
- Reid Flair (1988–2013), professional wrestler (Charlotte)
- Ric Flair (born 1949), professional wrestler (Charlotte)
- Raymond Floyd (born 1942), professional golfer, member of the World Golf Hall of Fame (Fayetteville)
- Phil Ford (born 1956), retired point guard for Kansas City Kings, New Jersey Nets, Milwaukee Bucks and Houston Rockets, won '78–'79 NBA Rookie of the Year Award; NBA coach (Rocky Mount)
- David Fox (born 1971), Olympic gold medalist swimmer in the men's 4 × 100 m freestyle at the 1996 Summer Olympics (Raleigh)
- Roman Gabriel (1940–2024), All-America quarterback for NC State; played for NFL's Los Angeles Rams and Philadelphia Eagles, named league's MVP in 1969 (Wilmington)
- Omar Gaither (born 1984), linebacker for Philadelphia Eagles (Charlotte)
- Julian Gamble (born 1989), basketball player in the Israeli Basketball Premier League
- Harry Gant (born 1940), former NASCAR driver (Taylorsville)
- David Garrard (born 1978), East Carolina University football player, quarterback for Jacksonville Jaguars (Durham)
- Kenny Gattison (born 1964), NBA player, coach for Atlanta Hawks (Wilmington)
- Alvin Gentry (born 1954), head coach for Phoenix Suns (Shelby)
- Joe Gibbs (born 1940), Hall of Fame head coach for NFL's Washington Redskins and owner of Joe Gibbs Racing; won Super Bowl in 1982, 1987, and 1991; won the NASCAR Cup Series Championship in 2000, 2002, 2005 and 2015 (Mocksville)
- Marcus Gilchrist (born 1988), cornerback for San Diego Chargers (High Point)
- Harry Giles (born 1998), NBA player for the Sacramento Kings (Winston-Salem)
- Mark Grace (born 1964), baseball player, Chicago Cubs and Arizona Diamondbacks All-Star and Gold Glove Award-winning first baseman; MLB record for hits (1,754) and doubles (364) in decade of 1990s, broadcaster, coach (Winston-Salem)
- Jimmy Graham (born 1986), tight end for New Orleans Saints, Seattle Seahawks, and Green Bay Packers (Goldsboro)
- Robert Griswold (born 1996), swimmer
- Todd Gurley (born 1994), former NFL running back, 3-time Pro Bowl selection and 2-time First-team All-Pro (Tarboro)

H–K

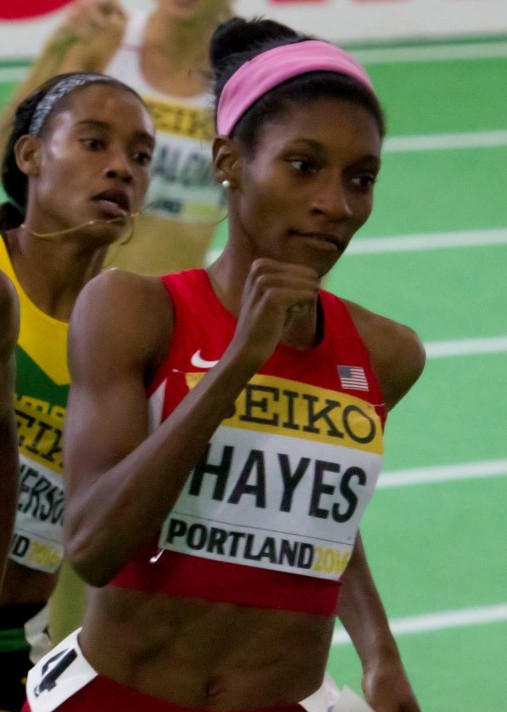
Quanera Hayes

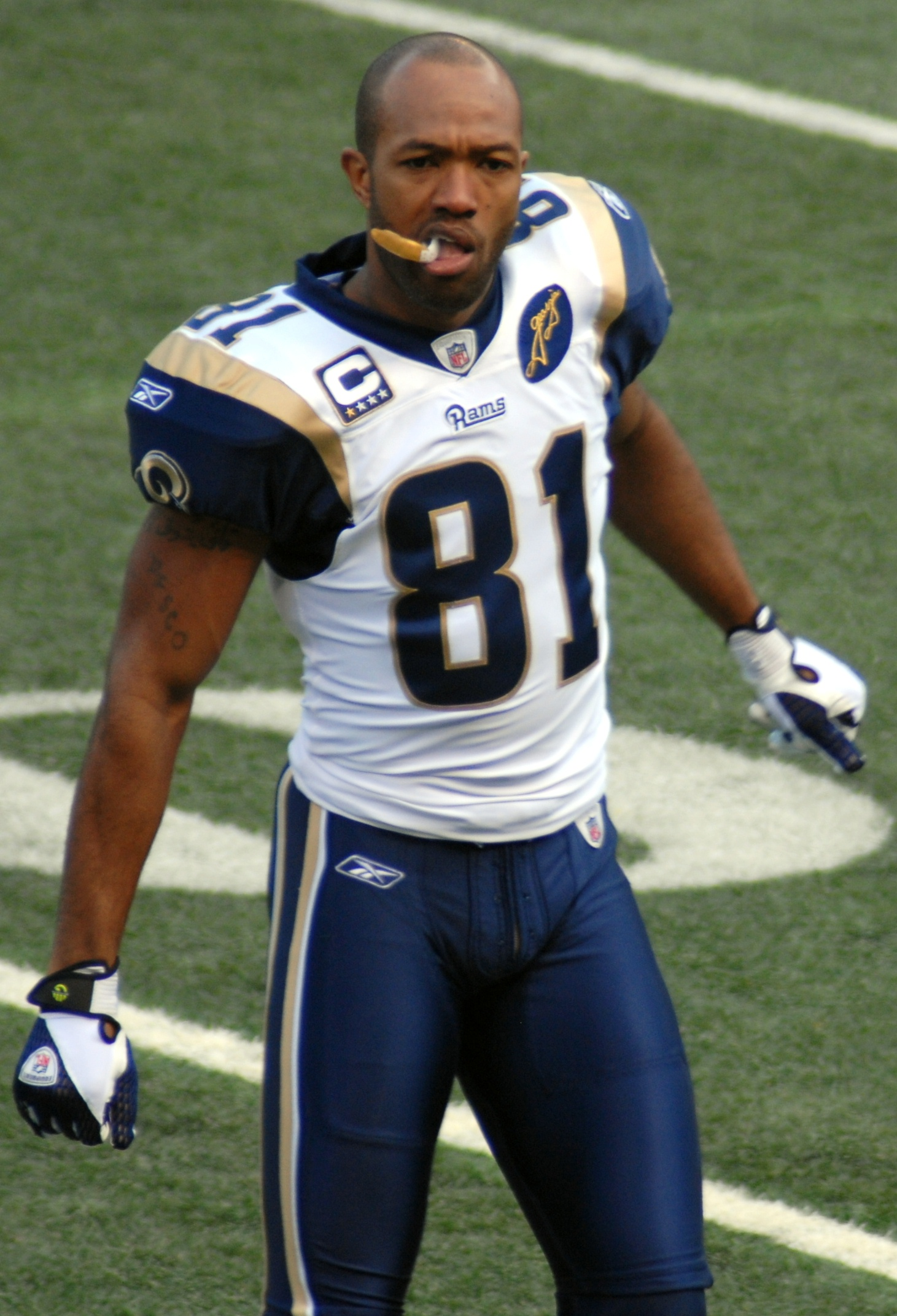
Torry Holt

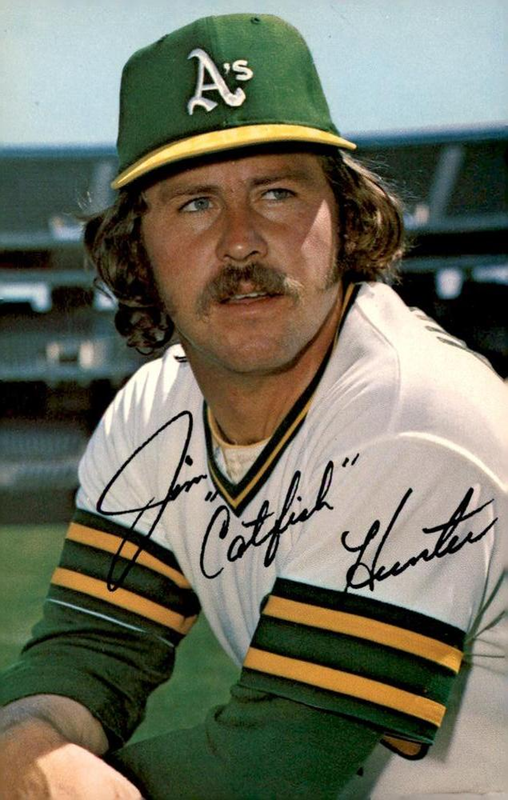
Jim "Catfish" Hunter

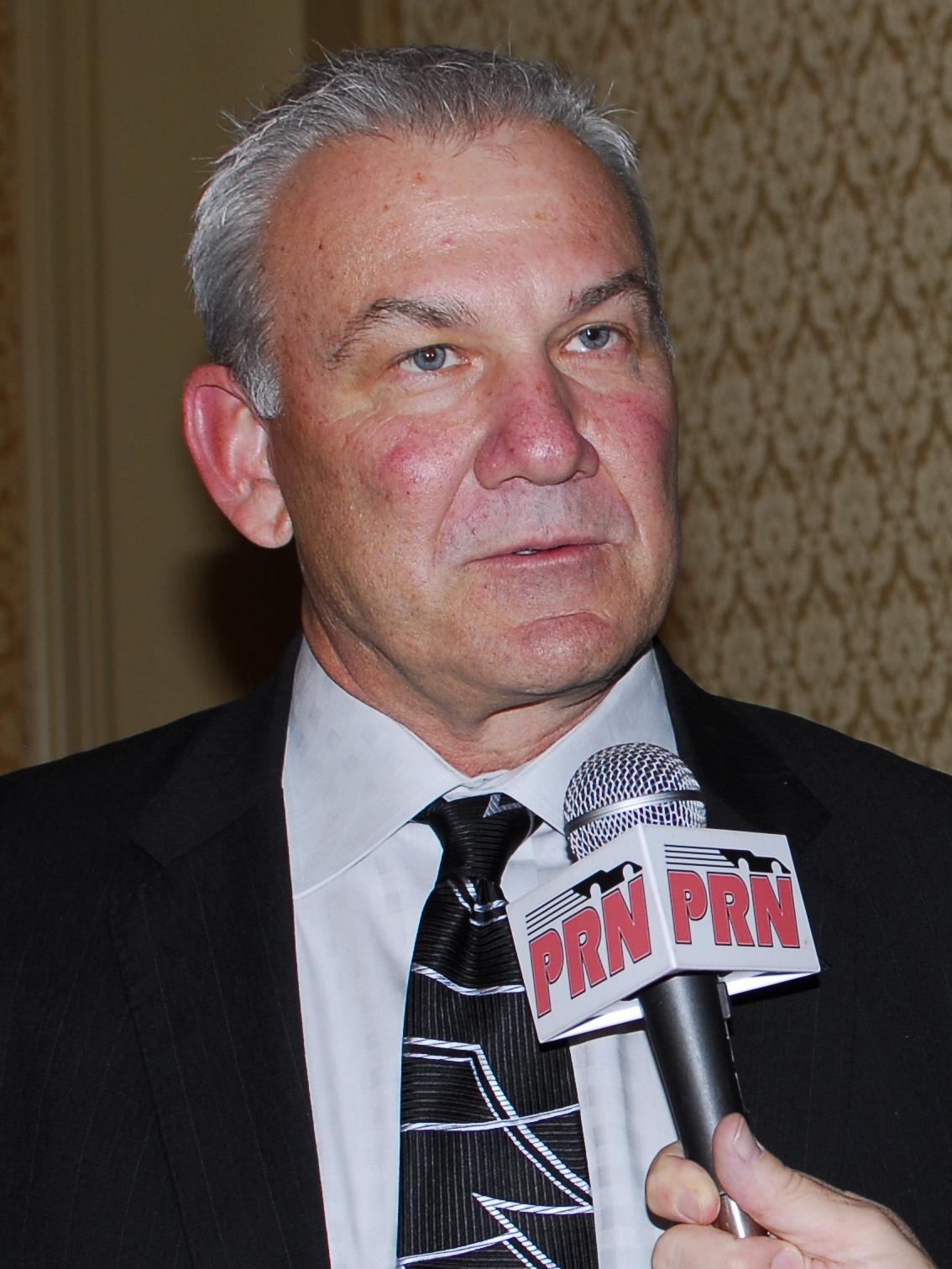
Dale Jarrett

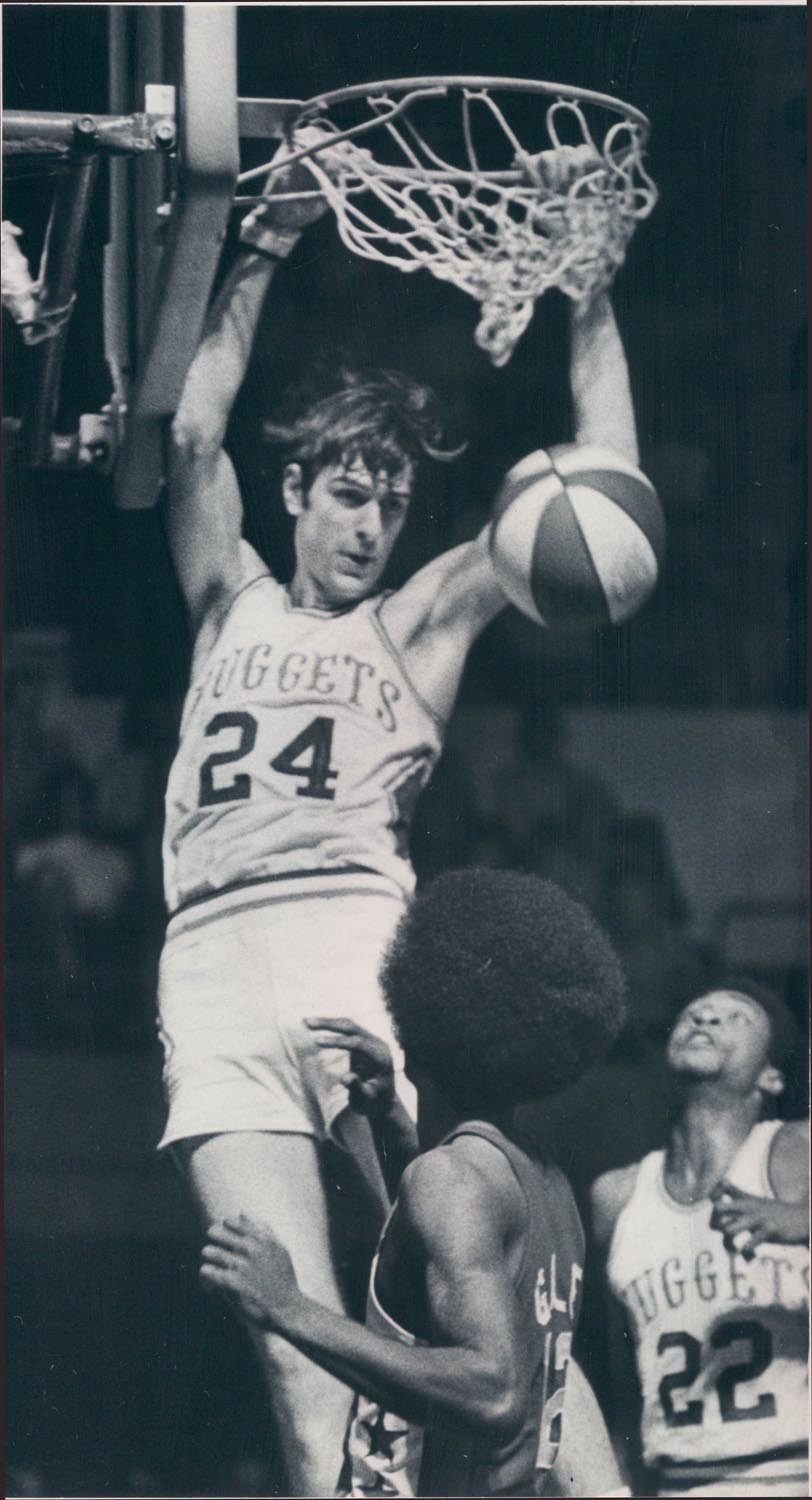
Bobby Jones

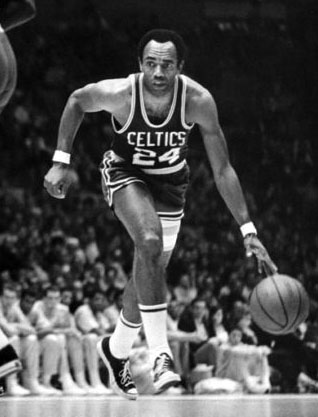
Sam Jones

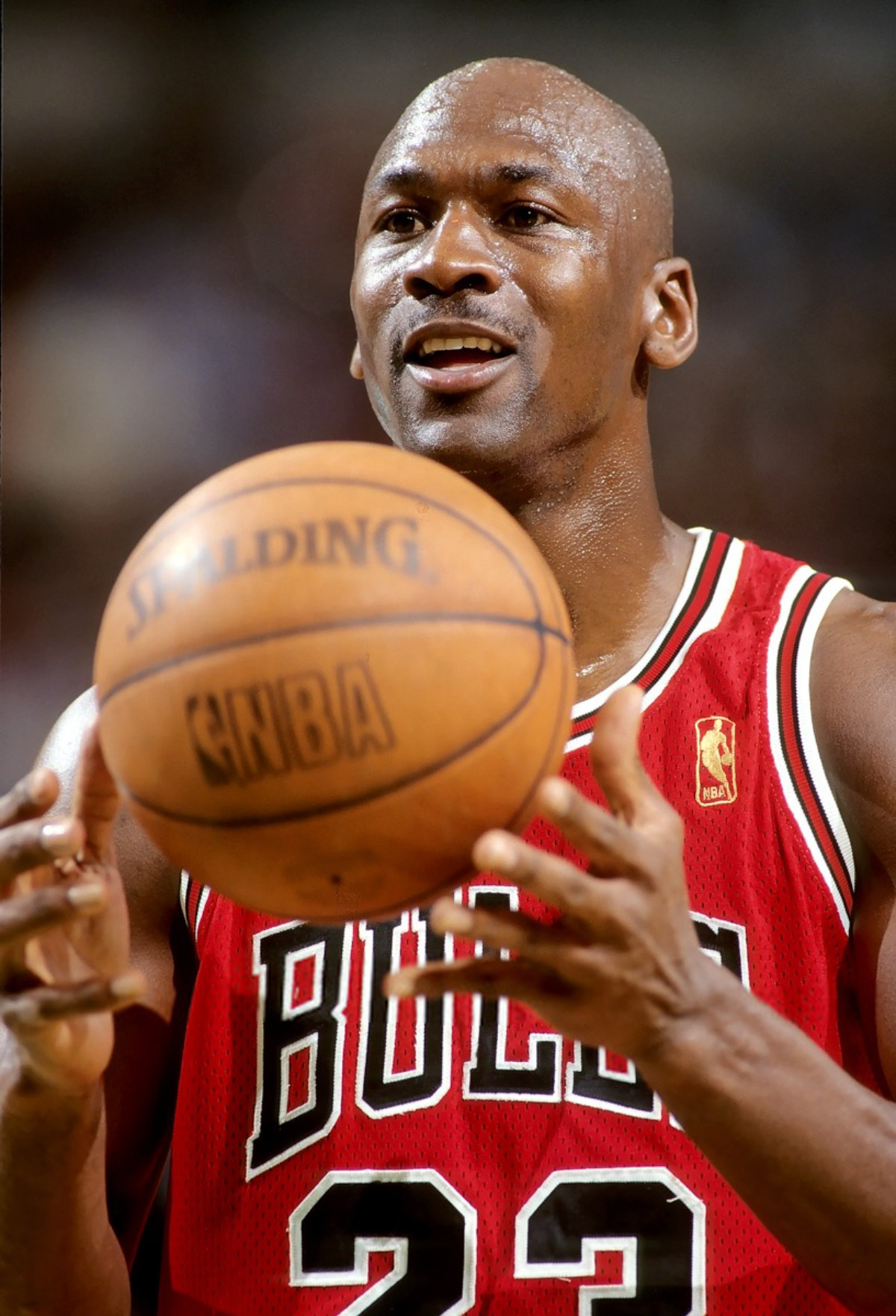
Michael Jordan

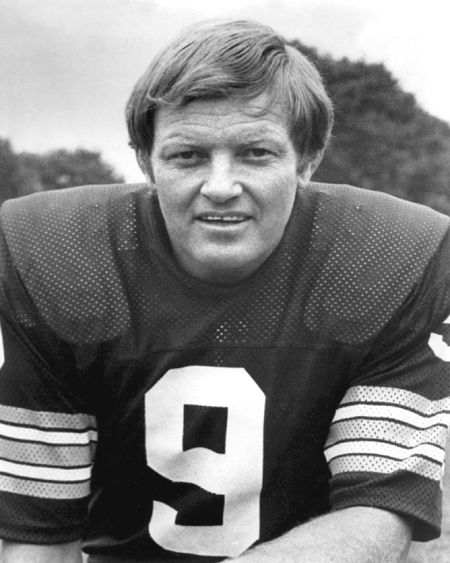
Sonny Jurgensen

- Bill Haas (born 1982), professional golfer (Charlotte)
- Dino Hackett (born 1964), former NFL linebacker for the Kansas City Chiefs and Seattle Seahawks (Greensboro)
- Joey Hackett (born 1958), former NFL tight end (Greensboro)
- Chris Hairston (born 1989), offensive tackle for Buffalo Bills (Winston-Salem)
- P. J. Hairston (born 1992), player for Charlotte Hornets (Greensboro)
- Jimmie Hall (born 1938), MLB outfielder (Mount Holly)
- Omarion Hampton (born 2003), NFL running back (Clayton)
- Chris Hanburger (born 1941), NFL linebacker for the Washington Redskins, member of the Pro Football Hall of Fame (Fort Bragg)
- Josh Hamilton (born 1981), outfielder for Texas Rangers (Raleigh)
- Dee Hardison (1956–2018), former NFL defensive lineman, primarily for Buffalo Bills and New York Giants (Jacksonville)
- Jeff Hardy (born 1977), professional wrestler, entertainer (Cameron)
- Justin Hardy (born 1991), wide receiver for Atlanta Falcons (Vanceboro)
- Matt Hardy (born 1974), professional wrestler, entertainer (Cameron)
- Javon Hargrave (born 1993), NFL defensive tackle (Salisbury)
- Montrezl Harrell (born 1994), power forward for Houston Rockets (Tarboro)
- C. J. Harris (born 1991), basketball player in the Israeli Basketball Premier League (Winston-Salem)
- Matt Harrison (born 1985), pitcher for Philadelphia Phillies (Durham)
- Kendra Harrison (born 1992), Olympic hurdler and world record holder in the 100 m outdoor hurdles (Clayton)
- Bryan Harvey (born 1963), MLB pitcher, two-time All-Star (1991, 1993) and AL saves leader in 1991 (Catawba)
- Chris Hatcher (born 1985), pitcher for Los Angeles Dodgers (Kinston)
- Quanera Hayes (born 1992), track and field sprinter, specializing in 400 metres (Hope Mills)
- William Hayes (born 1985), defensive end for Tennessee Titans (High Point)
- Brendan Haywood (born 1979), center for Cleveland Cavaliers (Greensboro)
- Andy Headen (born 1960), linebacker for New York Giants 1983–1988 (Asheboro)
- Madison Hedgecock (born 1981), fullback for St. Louis Rams and New York Giants; selected All-Pro in 2008 (Winston-Salem)
- Gregory Helms (born 1974), professional wrestler, entertainer (Smithfield)
- Tommy Helms, former Major League Baseball infielder, member of the Cincinnati Reds Hall of Fame (Charlotte)
- Daniel Hemric (born 1991), NASCAR driver (Kannapolis)
- B. J. Hill (born 1996), defensive end for the New York Giants (Oakboro)
- Ryan Hill (born 1990), long-distance runner (Hickory)
- Dave Henderson (born 1964), basketball player, 1991 Israeli Basketball Premier League MVP (Warrenton)
- Sterling Hitchcock (born 1971), former MLB pitcher for New York Yankees and San Diego Padres (Fayetteville)
- Megan Hodge (born 1988), indoor volleyball player (Durham)
- Greg Holland (born 1985), relief pitcher for Colorado Rockies (Marion)
- DeVonte Holloman (born 1991), former linebacker for Dallas Cowboys (Charlotte)
- Torry Holt (born 1976), NC State and St. Louis Rams wide receiver (1999–2008); seven-time NFL Pro Bowl (Gibsonville)
- Brad Hoover, football player for Carolina Panthers, attended Western Carolina University (Thoamsville)
- Joe Horn (born 1972), wide receiver, Atlanta Falcons, New Orleans Saints (Fayetteville)
- Josh Howard (born 1980), small forward and shooting guard for Utah Jazz (Winston-Salem)
- Sam Howell (born 2000), quarterback for Washington Commanders (Waynesville)
- Jason Hunter (born 1983), defensive end for Oakland Raiders (Charlotte)
- Catfish Hunter (1946–1999), Major League Baseball pitcher, starting for Oakland Athletics and New York Yankees in five World Series championships during 1970s; Baseball Hall of Fame (Hertford)
- Othello Hunter (born 1986), basketball player in the Israeli Basketball Premier League (Winston-Salem)
- D. J. Humphries (born 1993), NFL offensive tackle (Charlotte)
- Brandon Ingram (born 1997), NBA for the Los Angeles Lakers (Kinston)
- Mark Ingram Sr. (born 1965), NFL wide receiver, primarily with New York Giants (Gaston)
- Melvin Ingram (born 1989), NFL linebacker, three-time Pro Bowl selection (Hamlet)
- John Isner (born 1985), professional tennis player (Greensboro)
- Bobby Jackson (born 1973), NBA player and assistant coach of Sacramento Kings (East Spencer)
- Antawn Jamison (born 1976), NBA power forward and two-time All-Star (Charlotte)
- Dale Jarrett (born 1956), long-time NASCAR driver and winner of 1999 NASCAR Championship (Conover)
- Glenn Jarrett (born 1950), former NASCAR driver (Conover)
- Ned Jarrett (born 1932), former NASCAR driver; two-time NASCAR champion (Conover)
- Haywood Jeffires (born 1964), former NFL wide receiver, three-time Pro Bowl selection (Greensboro)
- Austin Johnson (born 1989), fullback for New Orleans Saints (Hickory)
- Brad Johnson (born 1968), former NFL quarterback, won Super Bowl XXXVII with the Tampa Bay Buccaneers (Black Mountain)
- James Johnson (1957–2019), Greco-Roman wrestler, multiple time Greco-Roman wrestling U.S. World Team member and U.S. Olympic Greco-Roman coach (Greenville)
- Junior Johnson (1931–2019), moonshiner who eluded capture by outrunning law enforcement on mountain roads; early superstar of NASCAR; subject of 1965 Esquire magazine article by Tom Wolfe (Wilkes County)
- Marc Johnson (born 1970), professional skateboarder (Winston-Salem)
- Paul Johnson (born 1957), college football coach, member of the College Football Hall of Fame (Newland)
- Bobby Jones (born 1951), member of the Naismith Memorial Basketball Hall of Fame (Charlotte)
- Daniel Jones (born 1997), NFL quarterback for the New York Giants (Charlotte)
- Sam Jones (1933–2021), Hall of Fame basketball player for Boston Celtics (Wilmington)
- Michael Jordan (born 1963), basketball player, University of North Carolina, winner of six NBA championships with Chicago Bulls, 1984 and 1992 Olympics gold medalist, member of Pro Basketball Hall of Fame, NBA executive (Wilmington)
- Sonny Jurgensen (born 1934), Pro Football Hall of Fame quarterback for Washington Redskins and Philadelphia Eagles; later served as commentator for Redskins radio (Wilmington)
- Darius Kilgo (born 1991), nose tackle for Denver Broncos (Matthews)
- Clyde King (1924–2010), MLB pitcher, coach, manager, general manager, and front office executive (Goldsboro)
- Jennifer King (born 1984), NFL offensive assistant (Eden)
- Donnie Kirkpatrick (born 1959), college football coach (Granite Falls)
- Stuart Krohn (born 1962), professional rugby union player (Durham)

L–N

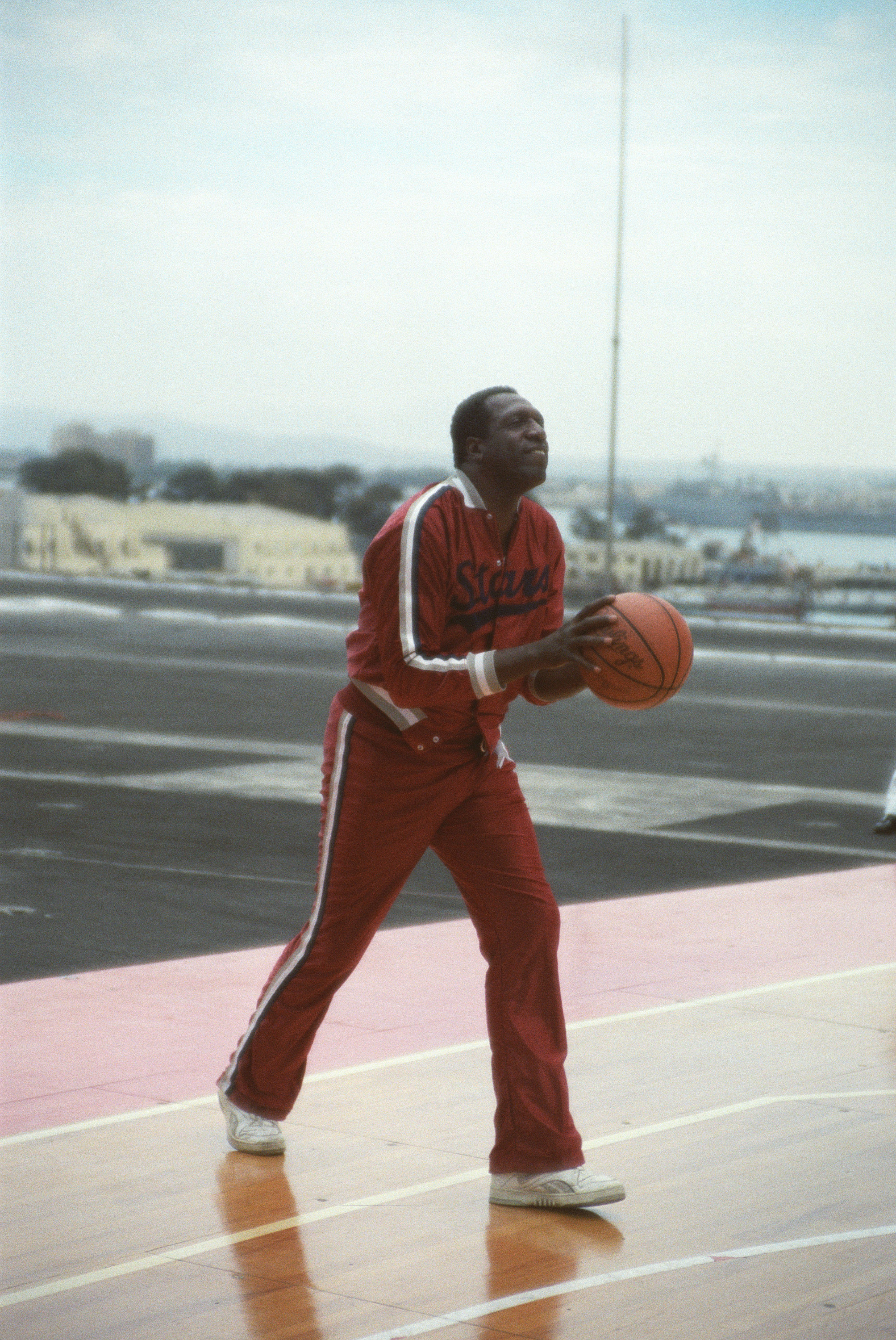
Meadowlark Lemon

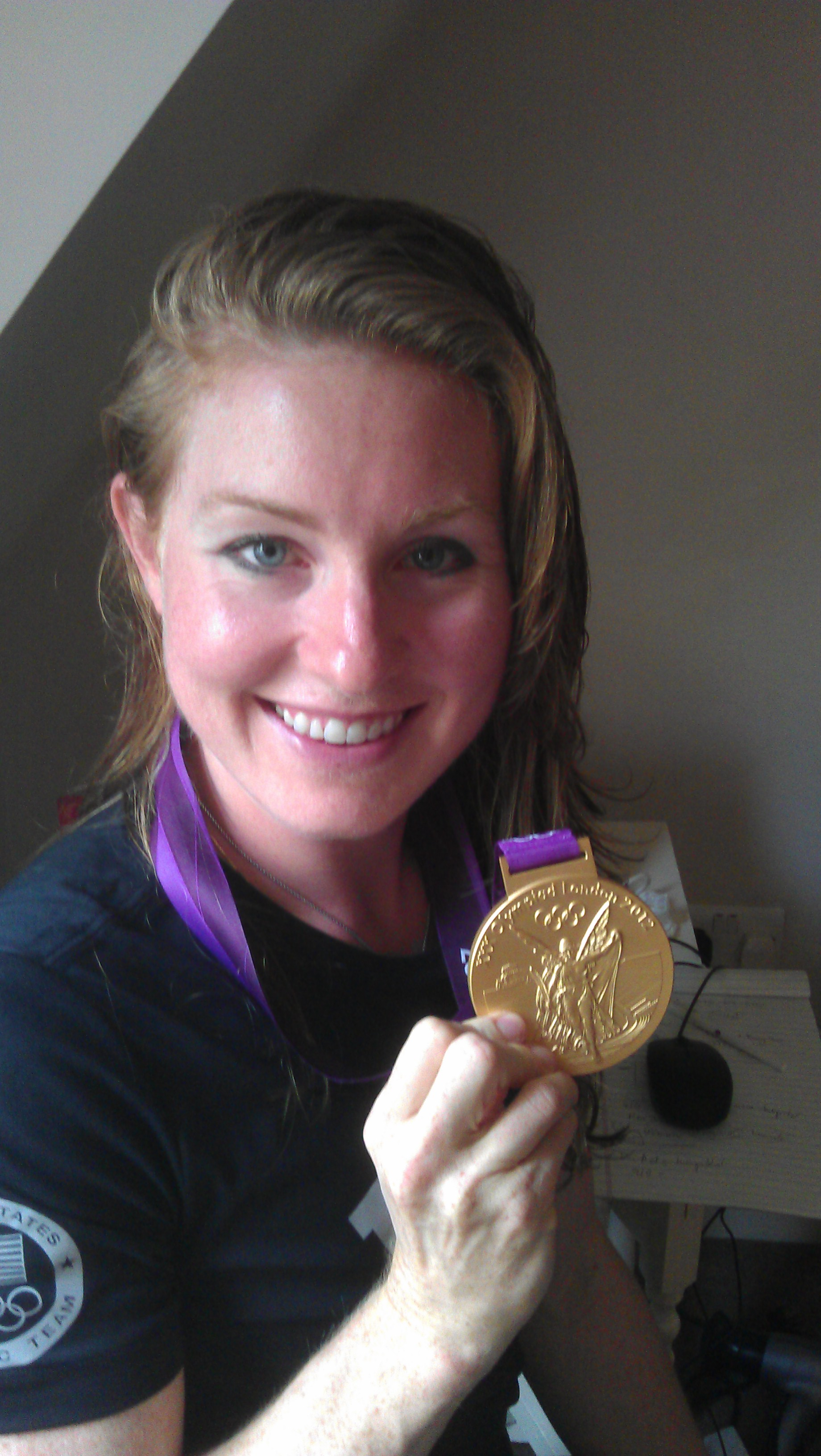
Caroline Lind

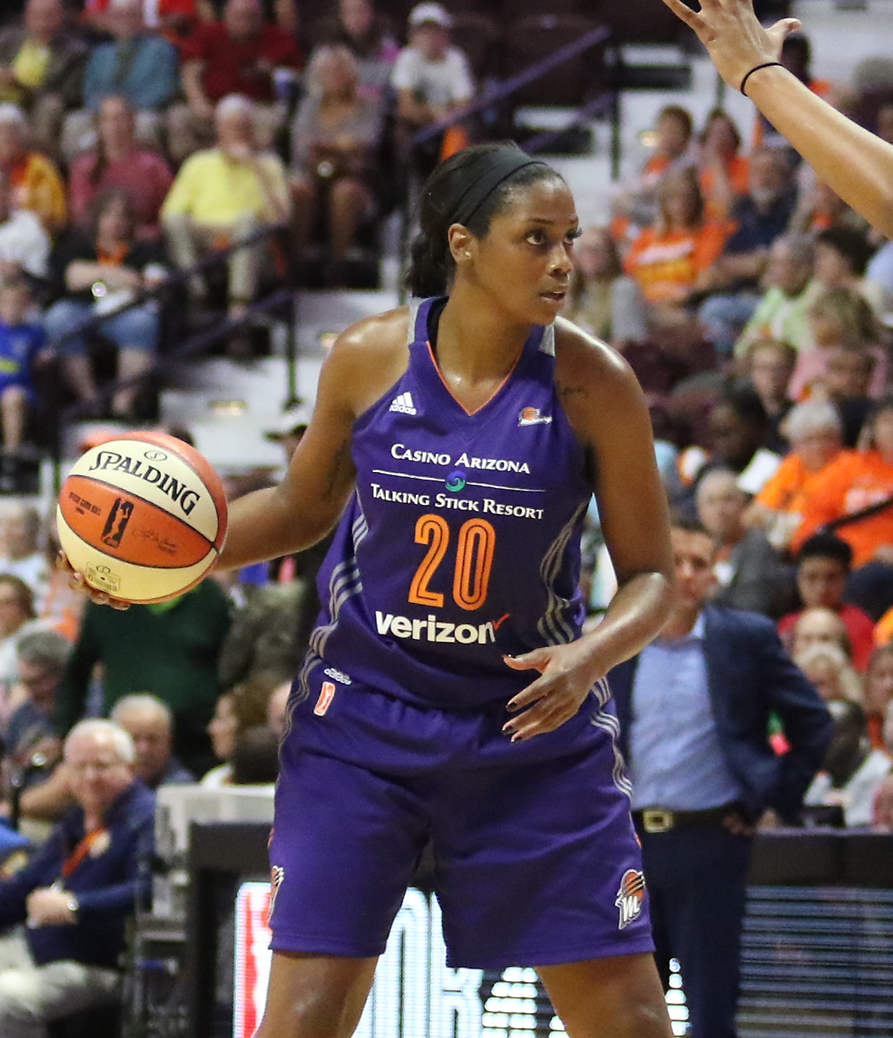
Camille Little

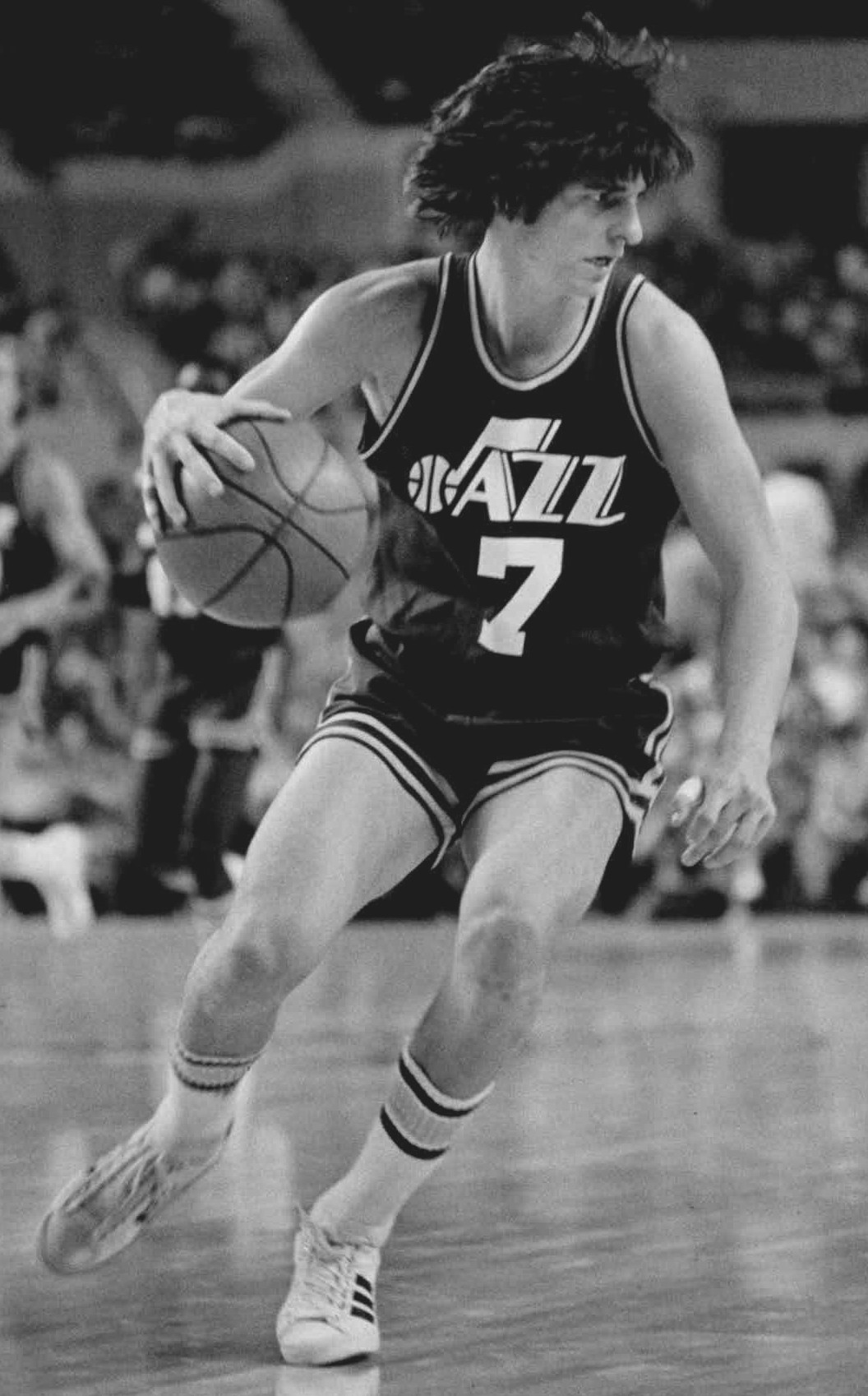
Pete Maravich

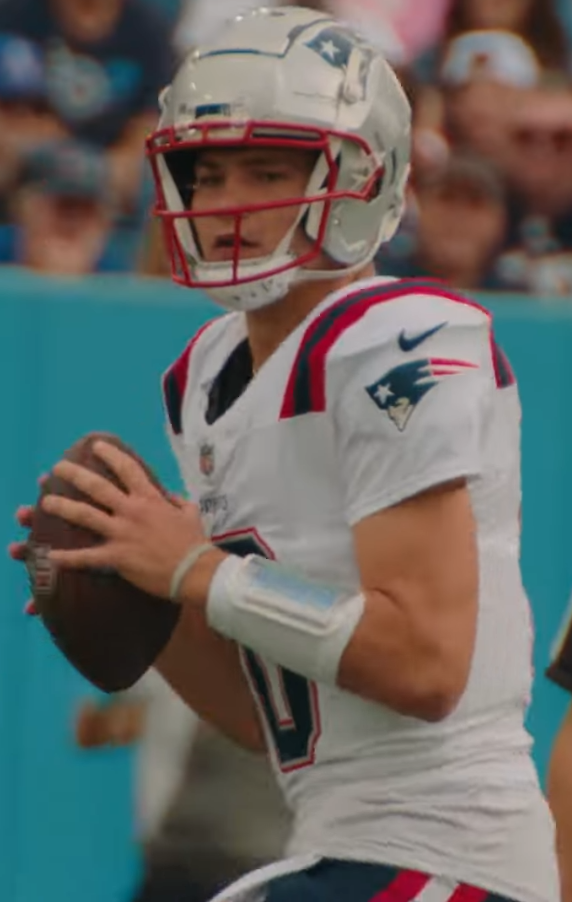
Drake Maye

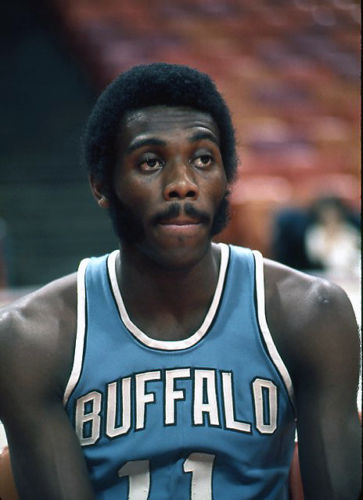
Bob McAdoo

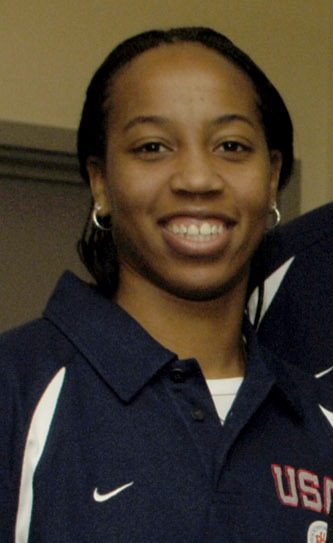
Chasity Melvin

- Corey LaJoie (born 1991), NASCAR driver (Concord)
- Max Lanier (1915–2007), former MLB pitcher (Denton)
- Mike LaValliere (born 1960), former MLB catcher who played with Philadelphia Phillies, St. Louis Cardinals and Pittsburgh Pirates (Charlotte)
- Dexter Lawrence (born 1997), nose tackle for the New York Giants (Wake Forest)
- Vonta Leach (born 1981), fullback for Baltimore Ravens (Lumberton)
- Chris Leak (born 1985), quarterback, led Florida Gators to 2006 BCS national championship (Charlotte)
- Meadowlark Lemon (1932–2015), basketball player for Harlem Globetrotters; nicknamed the "Clown Prince" (Wilmington)
- Buck Leonard (1907–1997), Baseball Hall of Fame, first baseman Homestead Grays (Rocky Mount)
- Sugar Ray Leonard (born 1956), championship boxer, 1976 Olympic gold medalist, world welterweight champion (Wilmington)
- Jake Leschyshyn (born 1999), NHL player (Raleigh)
- Joe Lewis (1944–2012), one of the fathers of full contact karate and kickboxing in the United States (Knightdale)
- Caroline Lind (born 1982), two-time Olympic gold medalist rower (Greensboro)
- Camille Little (born 1985), WNBA player (Winston-Salem)
- Greg Little (born 1989), wide receiver for Cleveland Browns (Durham)
- Zack Littell (born 1995), relief pitcher for the Minnesota Twins (Mebane)
- Sean Locklear (born 1981), offensive tackle for Seattle Seahawks (Lumberton)
- Davis Love III (born 1964), professional golfer, attended UNC-Chapel Hill (Charlotte)
- Rhett Lowder (born 2002), MLB pitcher (Albemarle)
- Calvin Lowry (born 1983), football player, Penn State and NFL's Tennessee Titans and Denver Broncos (Fayetteville)
- John Lucas II (born 1953), former NBA player, assistant coach for Houston Rockets (Durham)
- Michael Macchiavello (born 1994), freestyle and folkstyle wrestler, NCAA wrestling champion at NC State (Monroe)
- Kevin Mack (born 1962), former NFL fullback, two-time Pro Bowl selection (Kings Mountain)
- Bob Mann (1924–2006), wide receiver for Detroit Lions and Green Bay Packers; first African-American player for both teams; Green Bay Packers Hall of Fame in 1988 (New Bern)
- Bruce Matthews (born 1961), former NFL offensive lineman, 7-time First-team All-Pro, 14-time Pro Bowl selection, member of Pro Football Hall of Fame (Raleigh)
- Pete Maravich (1947–1988), Hall of Fame NBA player, graduated from Needham B. Broughton High School (Raleigh)
- Ricardo Marsh (born 1981), basketball player, 2007 top scorer in the Israel Basketball Premier League (Hillsborough)
- Kareem Martin (born 1992), outside linebacker for the New York Giants (Roanoke Rapids)
- Mohamed Massaquoi (born 1986), wide receiver for Cleveland Browns (Charlotte)
- J. B. Mauney (born 1987), professional bull rider on Built Ford Tough Series (Mooresville)
- Cameron Maybin (born 1987), outfielder for New York Yankees (Asheville)
- Drake Maye (born 2002), NFL quarterback (Charlotte)
- Luke Maye (born 1997), professional basketball player (Huntersville)
- Eric Maynor (born 1987), point guard for Oklahoma City Thunder (Raeford)
- Bob McAdoo (born 1951), Hall of Fame basketball player for UNC-Chapel Hill and NBA champion Los Angeles Lakers; led UNC to 1971 NCAA Final Four (Greensboro)
- Chris McCain (born 1991), linebacker for Miami Dolphins (Greensboro)
- Bob McCreary (born 1939), NFL offensive tackle (Hudson)
- "Quickdraw" Rick McGraw (1955–1985), professional wrestler (Charlotte)
- Bones McKinney (1919–1997), NBA player and college coach (Durham)
- Sara McMann (born 1980), Olympic silver medalist in women's freestyle wrestling, three-time World medalist (Marion)
- Kathy McMillan (born 1957), Olympic long jumper, member of National Track and Field Hall of Fame (Raeford)
- Nate McMillan (born 1964), retired guard for Seattle SuperSonics; head coach for Portland Trail Blazers (Raleigh)
- Lee Meadows (1894–1963), former MLB pitcher, NL wins leader and World Series champion (Oxford)
- John Meeks (born 1999), basketball player in the Israeli Basketball Premier League
- Chasity Melvin (born 1976), professional basketball player, WNBA All-Star (Roseboro)
- Whit Merrifield (born 1989), second baseman and left fielder for the Kansas City Royals (Advance)
- David Merritt (born 1971), NFL linebacker, defensive backs coach for New York Giants (Raleigh)
- Jason Miller (born 1980), mixed martial arts fighter (Fayetteville / Fort Bragg)
- Kevin Millwood (born 1974), pitcher for Seattle Mariners (Gastonia)
- Akil Mitchell (born 1992), American-Panamanian basketball player for Maccabi Rishon LeZion of the Israeli Premier League (Charlotte)
- Bryan Mitchell (born 1991), pitcher for New York Yankees (Reidsville)
- Brian Moehler (born 1971), starting pitcher for Houston Astros (Rockingham)
- Scottie Montgomery (born 1978), NFL wide receiver, coach for Pittsburgh Steelers (Shelby)
- Shannon Moore (born 1979), professional wrestler, entertainer (Cameron)
- Sio Moore (born 1990), NFL linebacker (Apex)
- Joe Morris (born 1960), running back for New York Giants and Cleveland Browns (Fort Bragg)
- Anthony Morrow (born 1985), basketball player for Oklahoma City Thunder (Charlotte)
- Malik Mustapha (born 2002), NFL safety (Weddington)
- Wil Myers (born 1990), MLB outfielder for Tampa Bay Rays, San Diego Padres (Thomasville)
- Jerry Narron, baseball catcher and coach, and manager of Texas Rangers and Cincinnati Reds
- Fred "Curly" Neal (1942–2020), guard for Harlem Globetrotters (Greensboro)
- John Hunter Nemechek (born 1997), NASCAR driver (Mooresville)
- Hakeem Nicks (born 1988), NFL wide receiver, Super Bowl XLVI champion with New York Giants (Charlotte)
- Dickie Noles (born 1956), MLB pitcher, 1980 World Series champion (Charlotte)

O–S

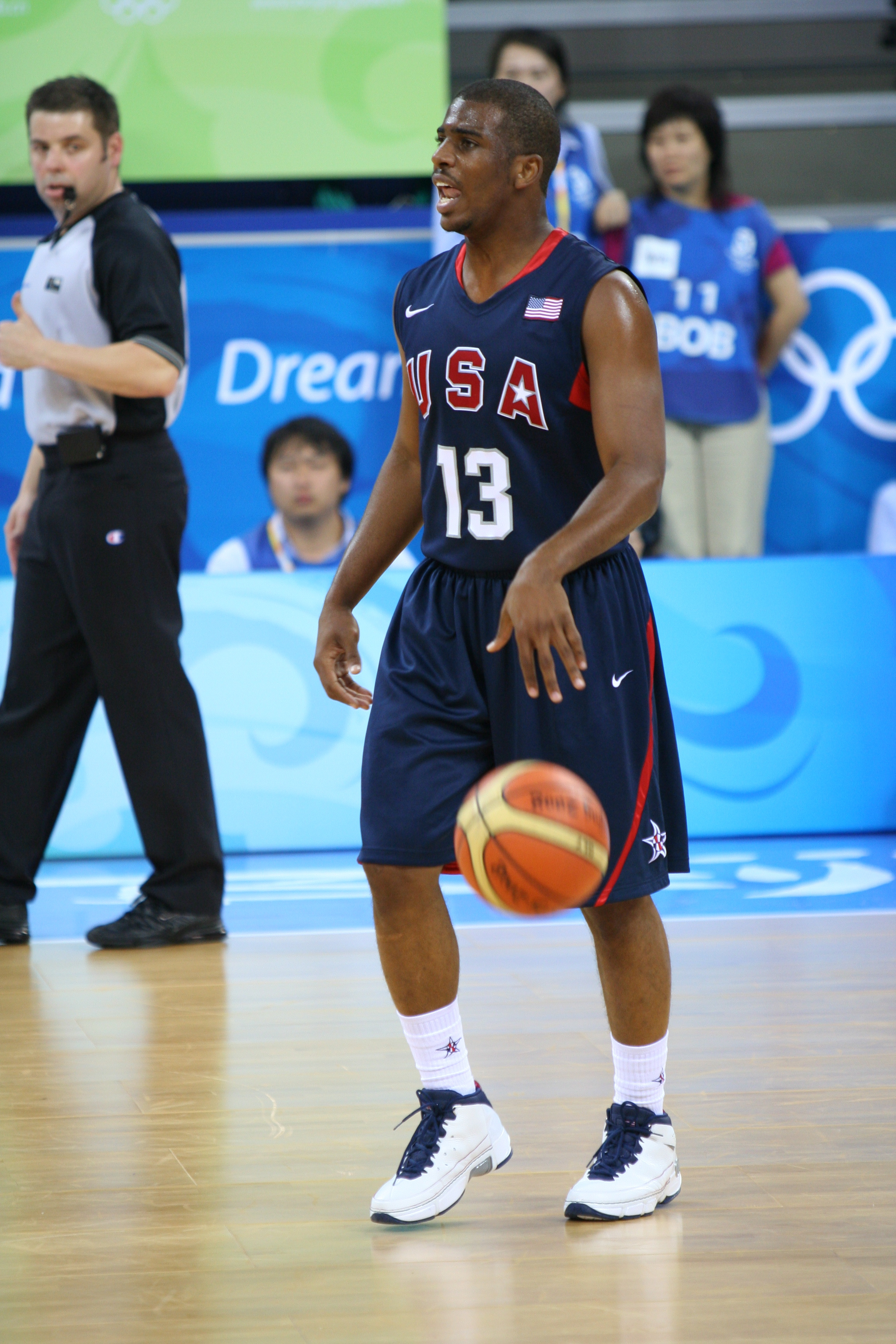
Chris Paul

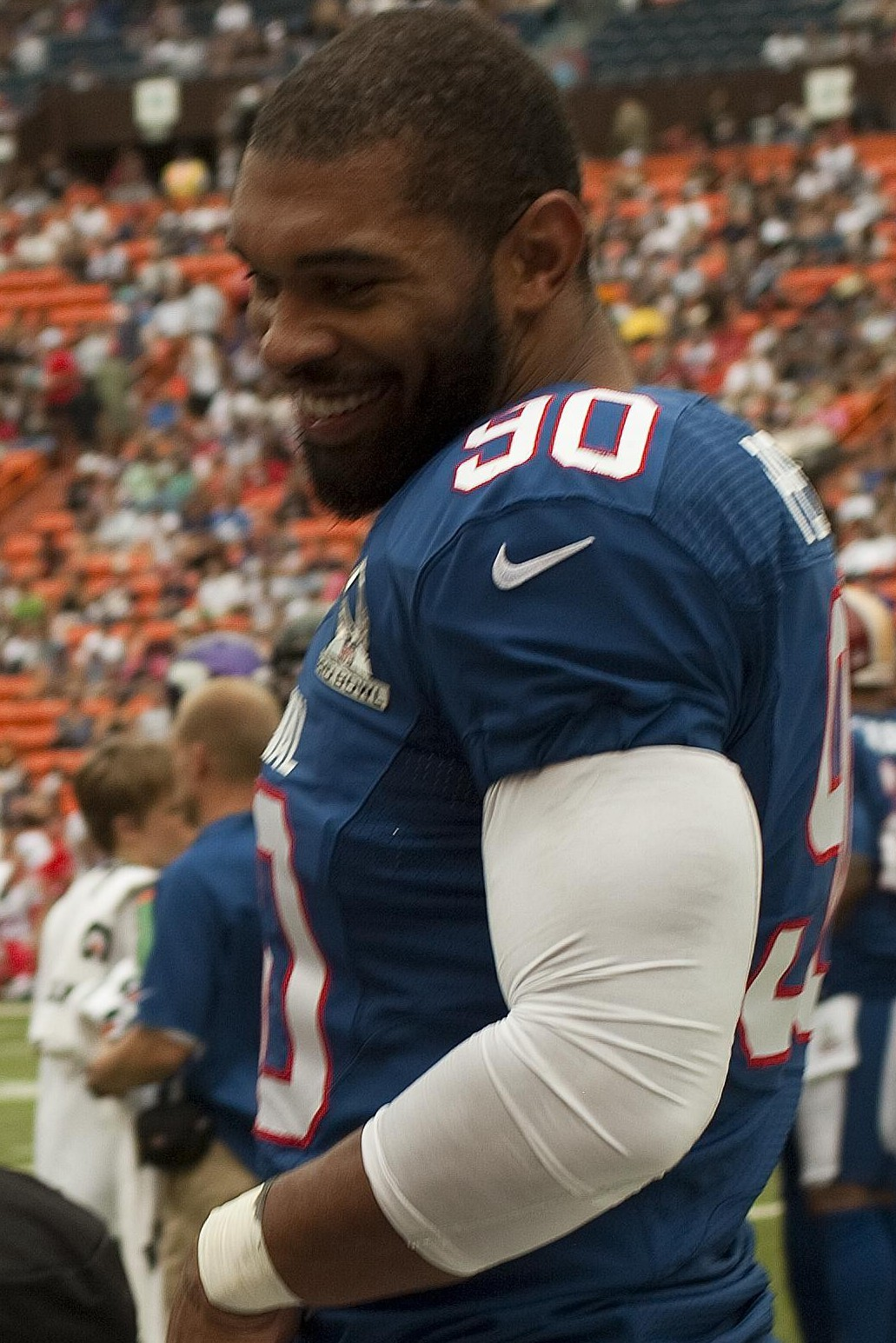
Julius Peppers

Gaylord Perry

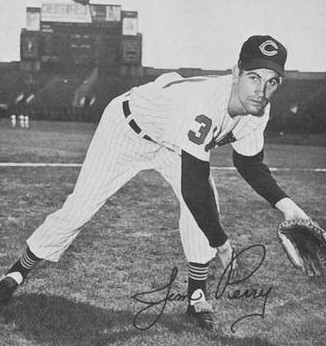
Jim Perry

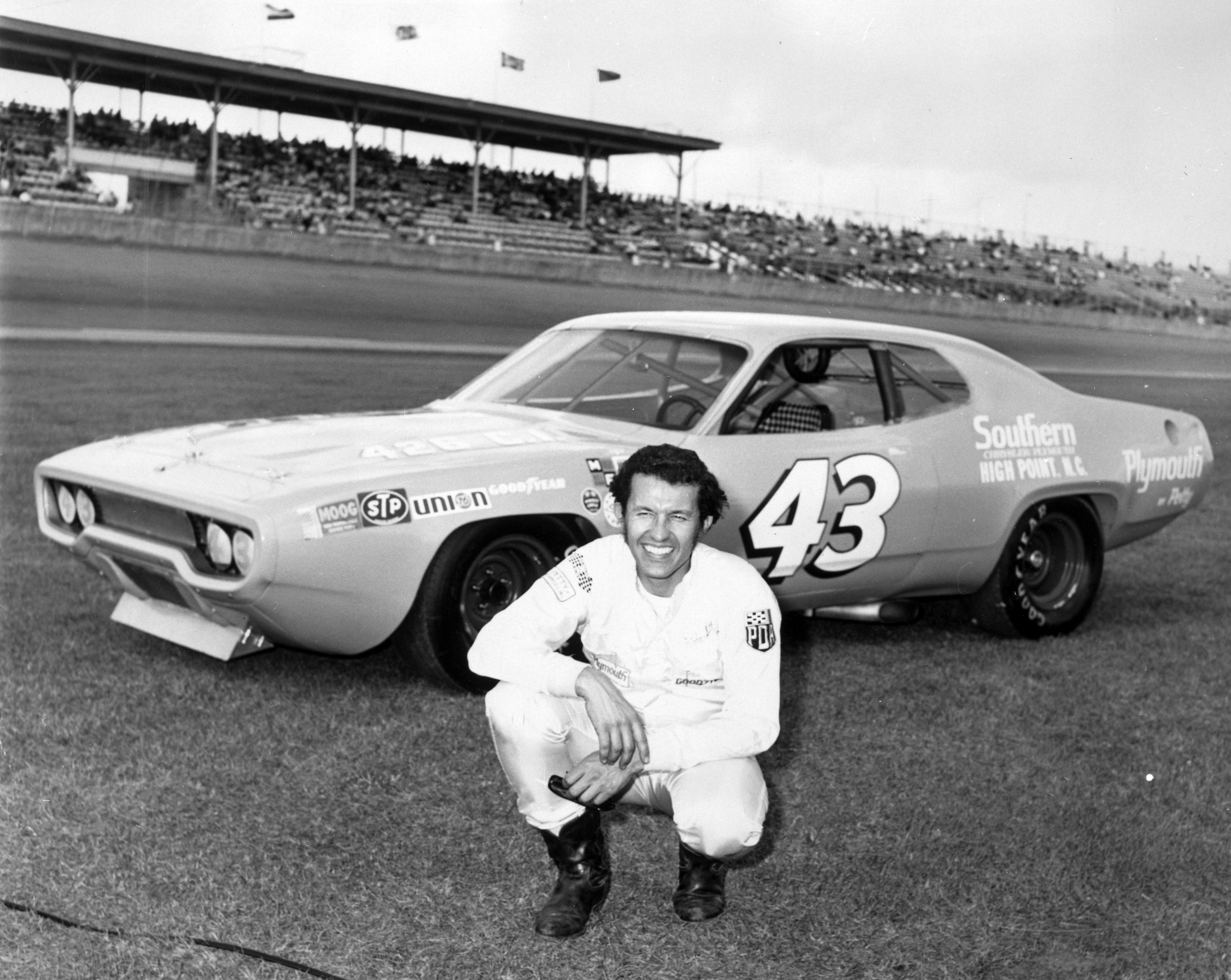
Richard Petty

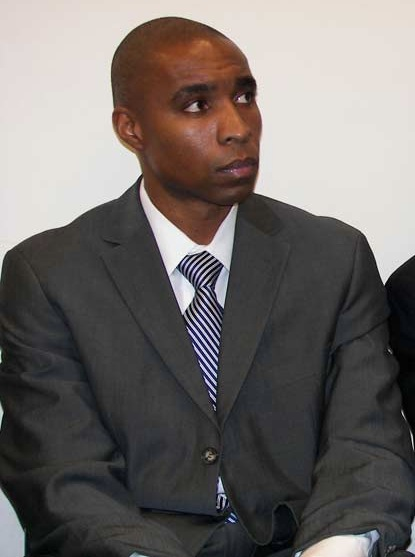
Eddie Pope

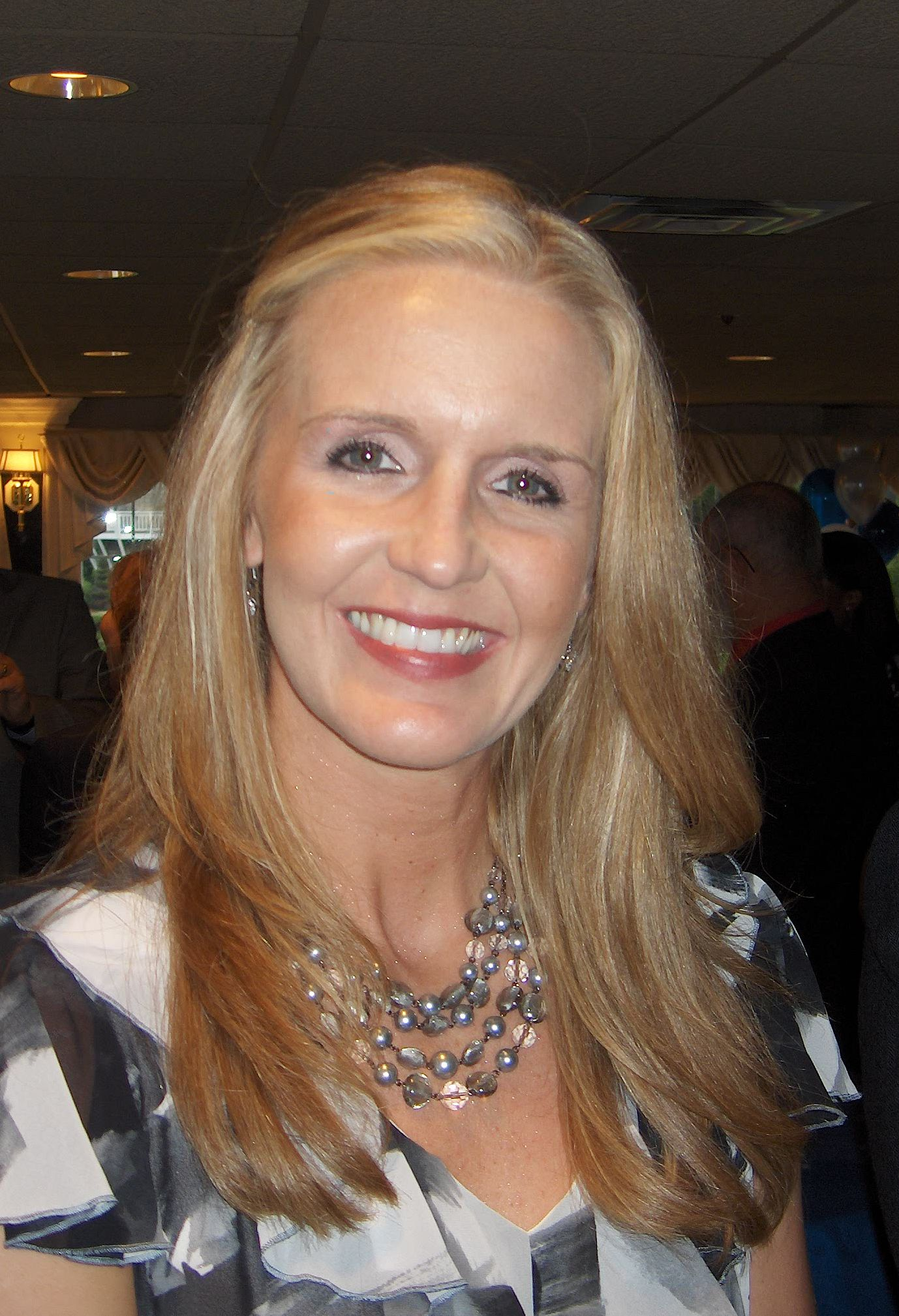
Shea Ralph

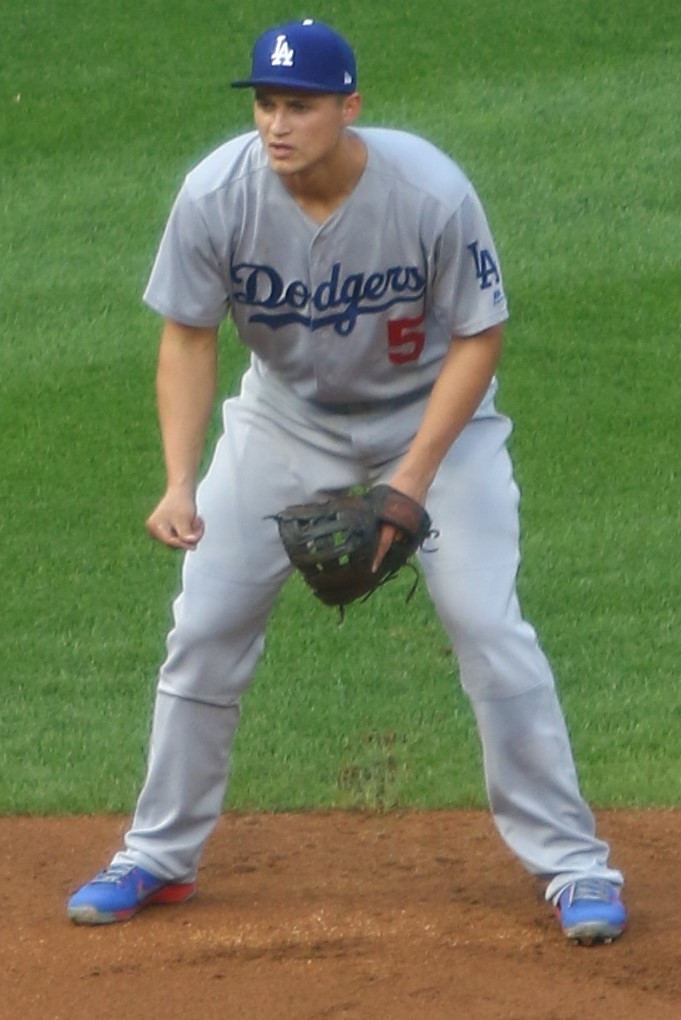
Corey Seager

- Johnny Oates (1946–2004), professional baseball player, coach, and manager (Sylva)
- Dave Odom (born 1942), men's college basketball coach (Goldsboro)
- Amber O'Neal (born 1974), professional wrestler (Ahoskie)
- Red O'Quinn (1925–2002), professional football player (Asheboro)
- Matt Osborne (1957–2013), professional wrestler (Charlotte)
- Willie Parker (born 1980), running back for Pittsburgh Steelers (Clinton)
- Benny Parsons (1941–2007), former NASCAR Winston Cup Series champion (Wilkesboro)
- Chris Paul (born 1985), All-Star point guard for Los Angeles Clippers, Houston Rockets, won NBA Rookie of the Year Award in 2006 (Lewisville)
- Logan Pause (born 1981), Major League Soccer player and member of USMNT (Hillsborough)
- Julius Peppers (born 1980), All-America football player and basketball player for UNC-Chapel Hill; only athlete in history to have played in both NCAA Final Four and NFL Super Bowl; 4× First-team All-Pro and 9× Pro Bowl selection (Bailey)
- Gaylord Perry (born 1938), MLB pitcher in Baseball Hall of Fame; first to win Cy Young Award in both American and National Leagues (Williamston)
- Greg Peterson (born 1984), defensive tackle, Tampa Bay Buccaneers, All-American at North Carolina Central University (Kenansville)
- Lee Petty (1914–2000), stock car driver, pioneer of NASCAR and three-time NASCAR champion in the 1950s; father of Richard Petty (Randleman)
- Richard Petty (born 1937), stock car driver, holder of NASCAR record for all-time victories at 200, 7-time Cup Series champion; son of Lee Petty (Randleman)
- Brandon Phillips (born 1981), second baseman for Atlanta Braves, two-time All-Star and won the Gold Glove Award three times (Raleigh)
- Karlyn Pickens (born 2004), professional softball pitcher (Weaverville)
- Bradley Pinion (born 1994), punter for San Francisco 49ers (Concord)
- Eddie Pope (born 1973), former Major League Soccer player, member of the USMNT, member of the National Soccer Hall of Fame (High Point)
- J. T. Poston (born 1993), professional golfer (Hickory)
- Drake Powell (born 2005), NBA player (Pittsboro)
- Landon Powell (born 1982), catcher and first baseman for Oakland A's (Raleigh)
- Mike Quick (born 1959), wide receiver with Philadelphia Eagles (1982–1990)
- Shea Ralph (born 1978), former professional basketball player and college head coach (Fayetteville)
- Shavlik Randolph (born 1983), NBA player (Raleigh)
- Juvonte Reddic (born 1992), basketball player in the Israeli Basketball Premier League
- Kevin Reddick (born 1989), linebacker for Carolina Panthers (New Bern)
- Jeff Reed (born 1979), placekicker for Pittsburgh Steelers (Charlotte)
- Mary Reynolds (1921–1991), player in All-American Girls Professional Baseball League (Gastonia)
- Denzel Rice (born 1993), cornerback for Philadelphia Eagles (Winston-Salem)
- Jerry Richardson (born 1936), NFL player for Baltimore Colts and owner of Carolina Panthers (Spring Hope)
- Jordan Rinaldi (born 1987), UFC fighter (Charlotte)
- Sylvester "Junkyard Dog" Ritter (1952–1998), professional wrestler and college football player (Wadesboro)
- Brian Roberts (born 1977), MLB second baseman, primarily with Baltimore Orioles (Durham)
- Lee Rouson (born 1962), running back for New York Giants and Cleveland Browns (Elizabeth City)
- John Sadri (born 1956), professional tennis player (Charlotte)
- Kelvin Sampson (born 1955), head basketball coach for University of Houston (Laurinburg)
- Charlie Sanders (1946–2015), Pro Football Hall of Fame tight end for Detroit Lions (Greensboro)
- Scott Satterfield (born 1972), college football coach (Hillsborough)
- Corey Seager (born 1994), MLB shortstop, 2020 World Series MVP with the Los Angeles Dodgers (Charlotte)
- Kyle Seager (born 1987), third baseman for Seattle Mariners (Kannapolis)
- Richie Shaffer (born 1991), infielder for Tampa Bay Rays (Charlotte)
- Tyler Shatley (born 1991), guard for Jacksonville Jaguars (Icard)
- Kelvin Sampson (born 1955), head basketball coach for University of Houston (Laurinburg)
- Mike Shildt (born 1968), manager for the St. Louis Cardinals (Charlotte)
- Razor Shines (born 1956), first baseman for Montreal Expos (Durham)
- Floyd Simmons (1923–2008), two-time Olympic bronze medalist in the decathlon (Charlotte)
- Webb Simpson (born 1985), professional golfer on the PGA Tour, winner of 2012 U.S. Open and 2018 Players Championship (Raleigh)
- Enos Slaughter (1916–2002), right fielder and Baseball Hall of Famer for St. Louis Cardinals and New York Yankees (Roxboro)
- Terrmel Sledge (born 1977), former MLB outfielder and current outfielder for Yokohama BayStars (Fayetteville)
- Ben Smith (born 1988), National Hockey League (NHL) player; first player born in North Carolina to have name engraved in Stanley Cup (Winston-Salem)
- D. J. Smith (born 1989), linebacker for Green Bay Packers (Charlotte)
- Dennis Smith Jr. (born 1997), NBA player for New York Knicks (Fayetteville)
- Ish Smith (born 1988), point guard for Oklahoma City Thunder, Detroit Pistons (Charlotte)
- Brandon Spikes (born 1987), linebacker for New England Patriots (Shelby)
- Jerry Stackhouse (born 1974), All-America basketball player for UNC-Chapel Hill and Atlanta Hawks, NBA's 1996 All-Rookie team (Kinston)
- Richie Steamboat (born 1987), former professional wrestler (Charlotte)
- Dwight Stephenson (born 1957), former NFL center, member of the Pro Football Hall of Fame (Murfreesboro)
- Melvin Stewart (born 1968), two-time Olympic gold medalist, International Swimming Hall of Fame, SwimSwam co-founder (Gastonia)
- Hal Stowe (born 1937), former pitcher for New York Yankees (Gastonia)
- Sarah Strong (born 2006), basketball player for the UConn Huskies (Durham)
- Braun Strowman (born 1985), professional wrestler, strongman, entertainer (Sherrills Ford)
- Ryan Succop (born 1986), NFL placekicker for Tampa Bay Buccaneers (Hickory)
- Brett Swain (born 1986), wide receiver for San Francisco 49ers (Asheville)
- J. R. Sweezy (born 1989), offensive guard for Seattle Seahawks (Mooresville)
- John Swofford (born 1948), commissioner of ACC, former athletic director of UNC-Chapel Hill (North Wilkesboro)

T–Z

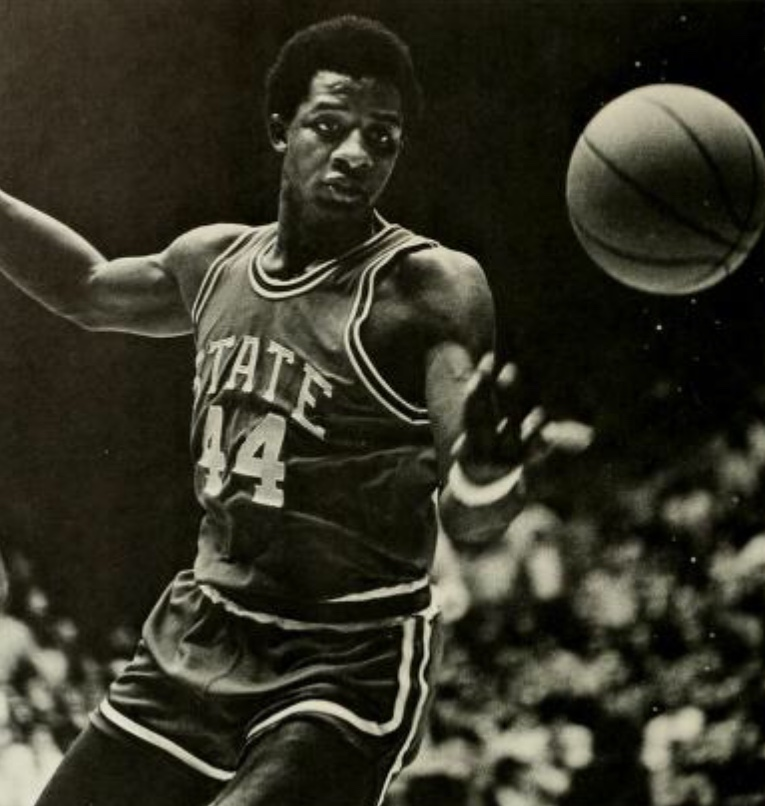
David Thompson

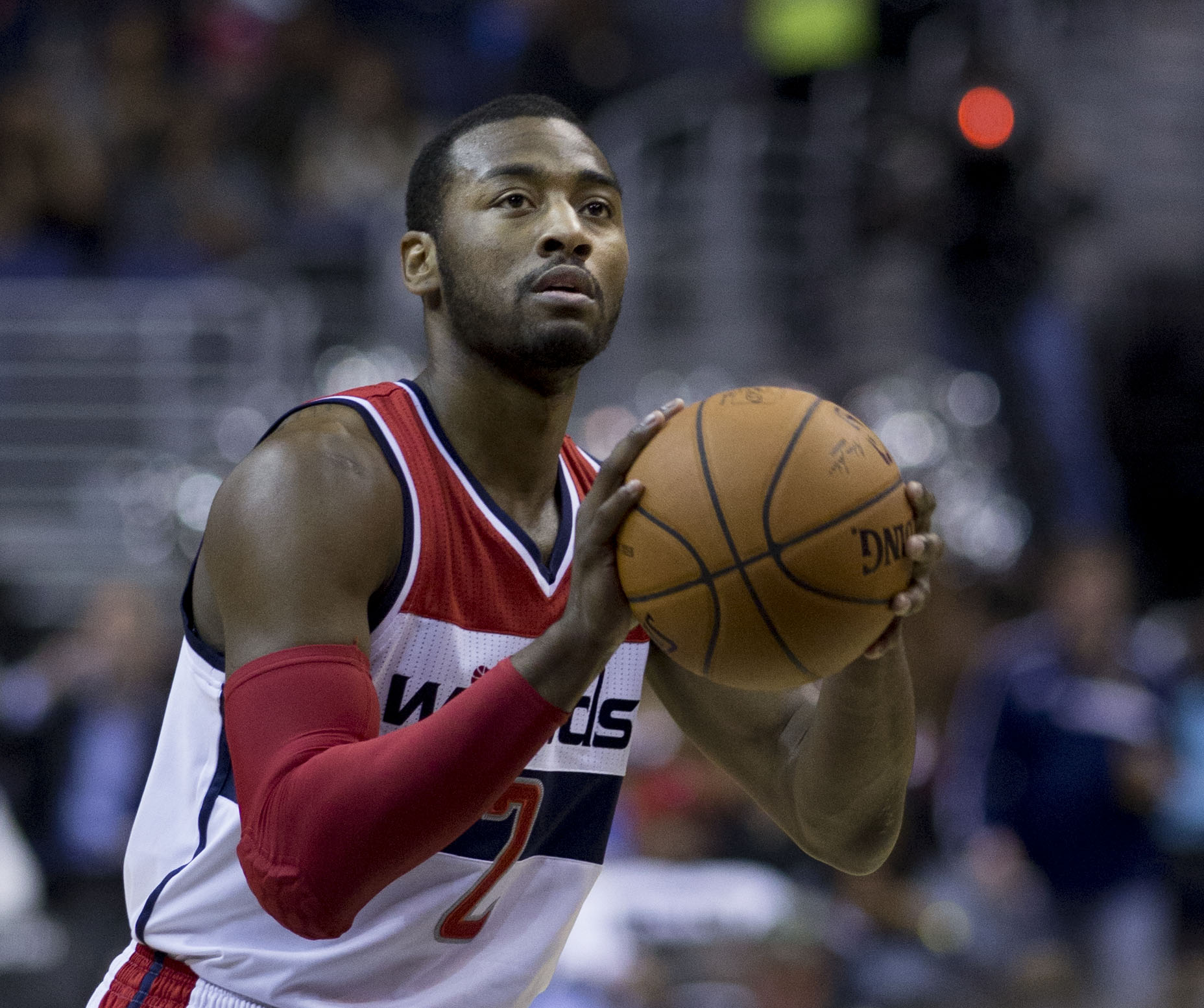
John Wall

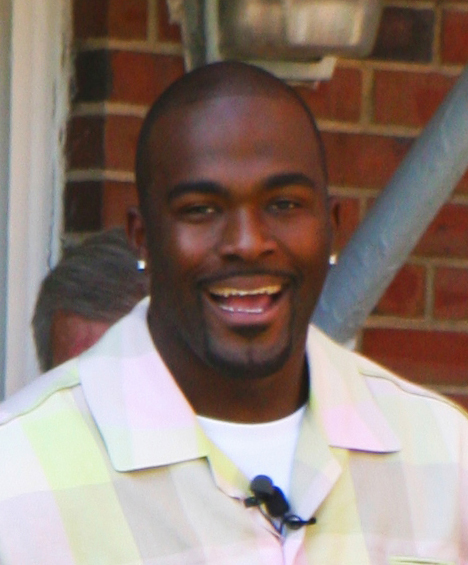
Mario Williams

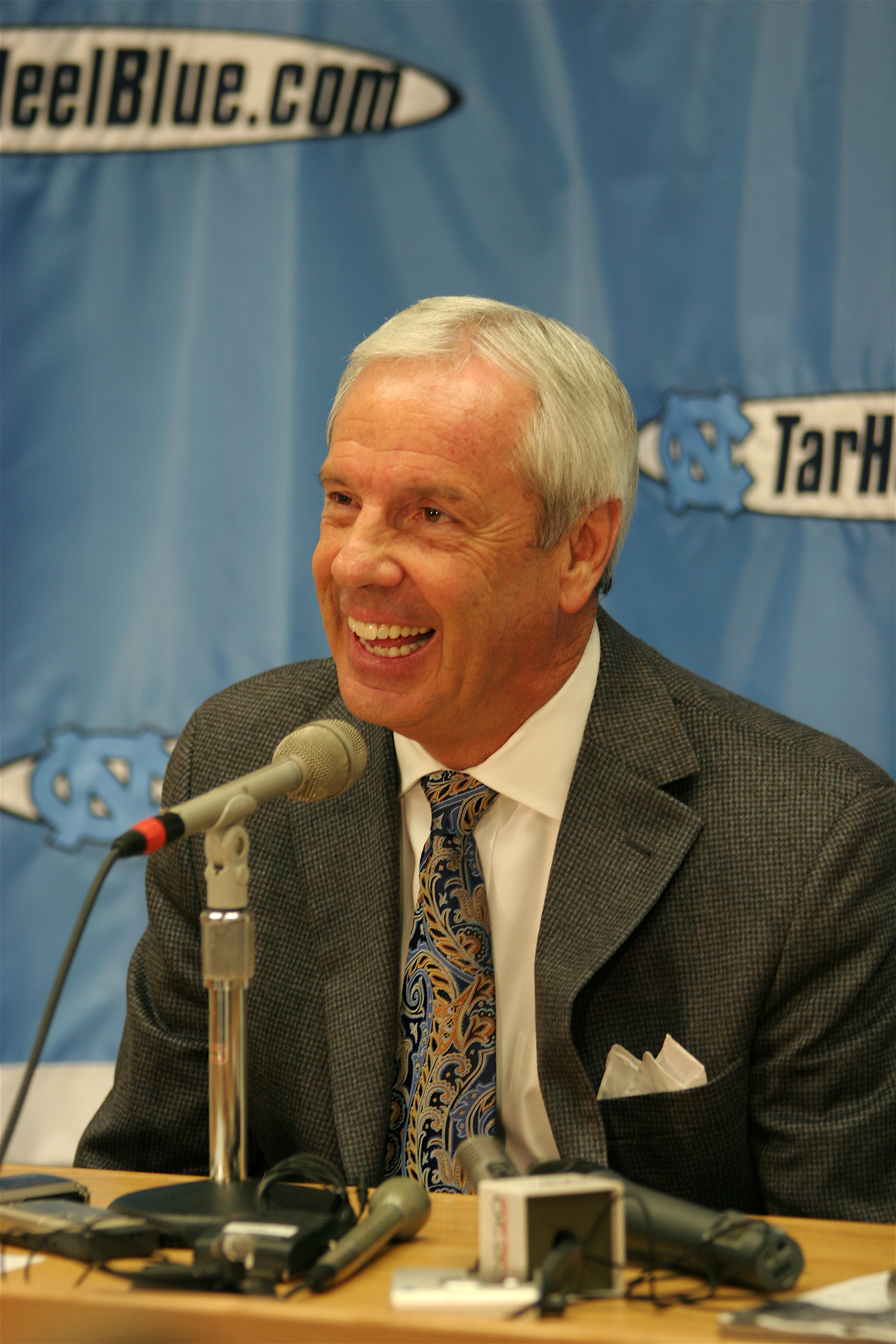
Roy Williams

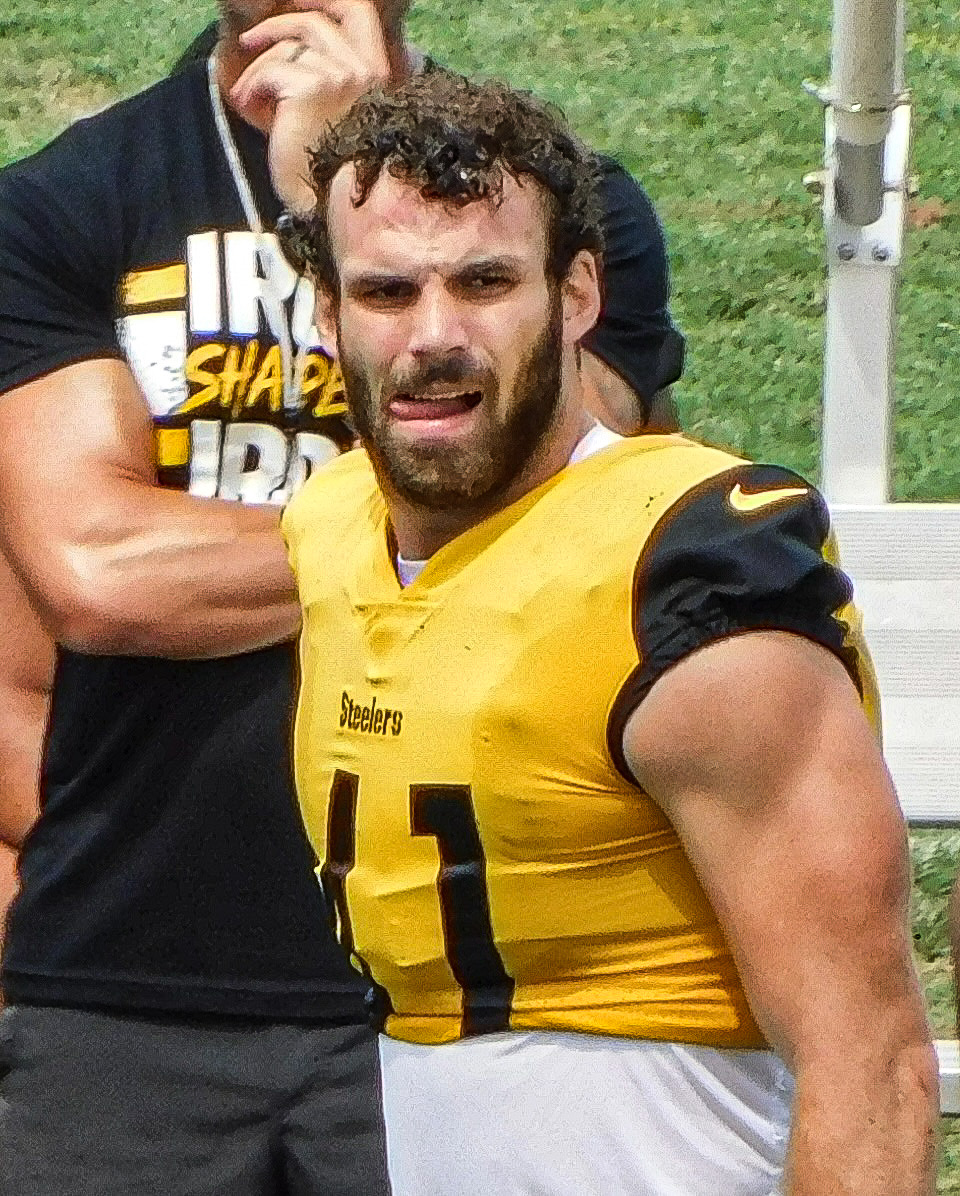
Payton Wilson

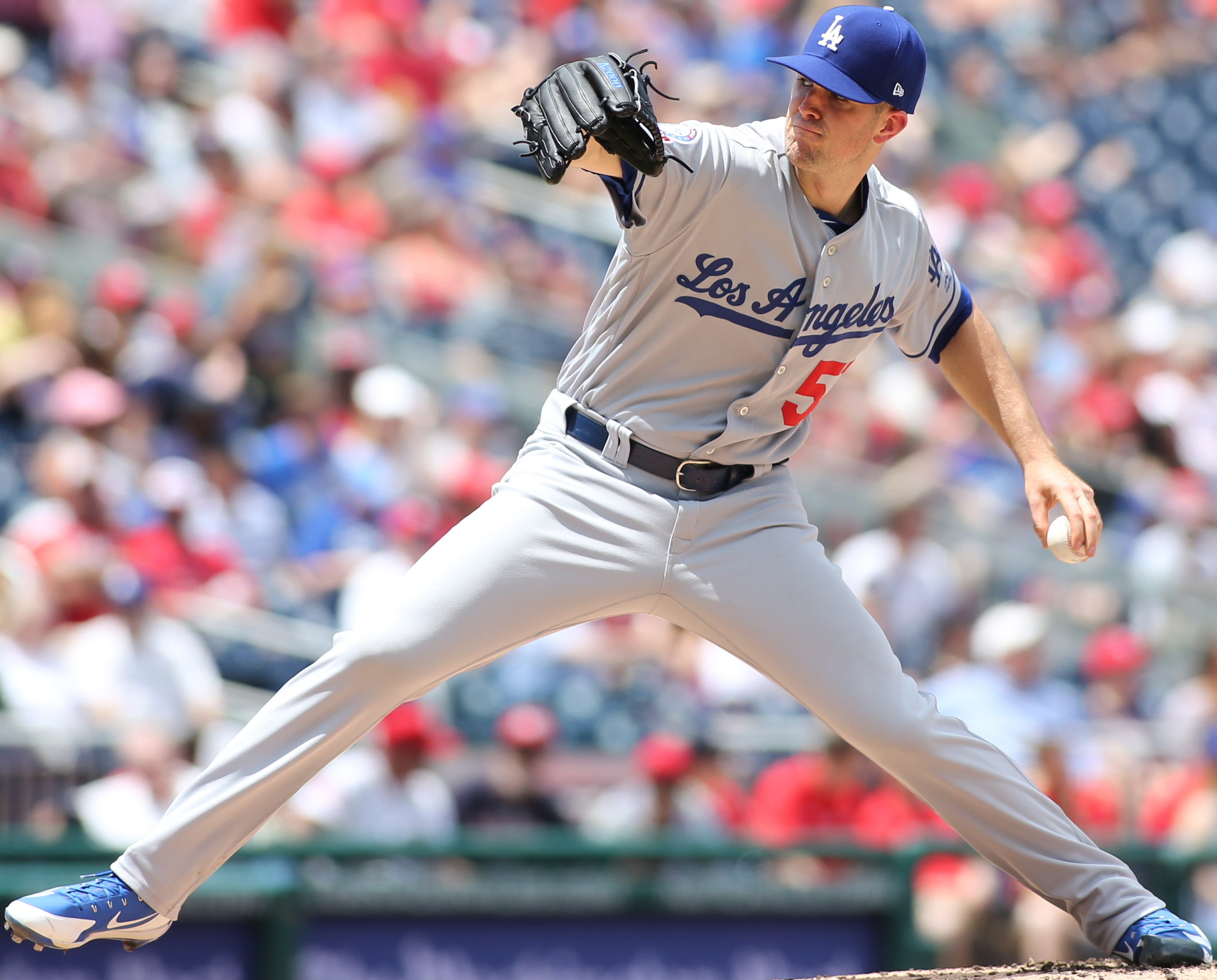
Alex Wood

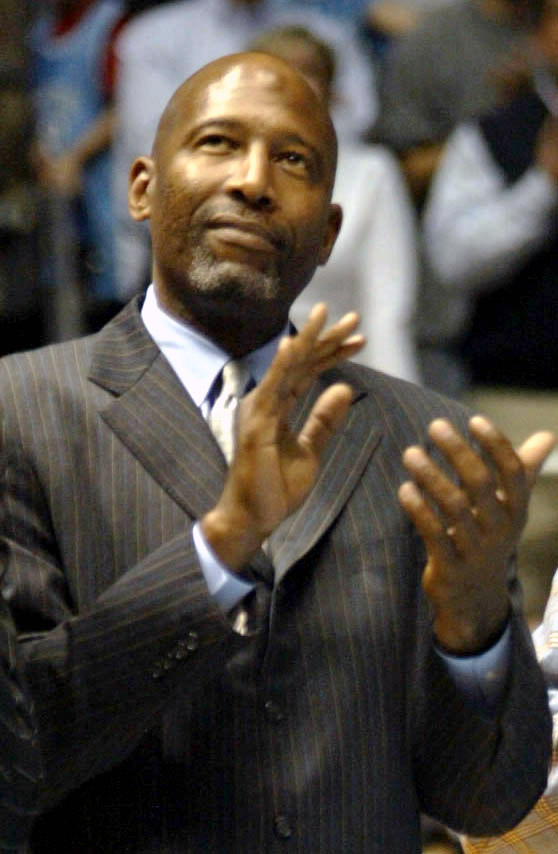
James Worthy

- Ray Tanner (born 1958), former college baseball head coach, athletic director at University of South Carolina (Benson)
- Brandon Tate (born 1987), wide receiver for New England Patriots, holds NCAA career record for most combined return yards (3,523) (Burlington)
- Brenda Taylor (born 1979), Olympic hurdler (Boone)
- Ryan Taylor (born 1987), tight end for Green Bay Packers (Winston-Salem)
- Johnny Temple (1927–1994), former MLB player and coach, 6× MLB All-Star (Lexington)
- Tab Thacker (1962–2007), NCAA wrestling champion, three-time NCAA All-American, and actor (Winston-Salem)
- Cam Thomas (born 1986), nose tackle for San Diego Chargers (Eagle Springs)
- Herb Thomas (1923–2000), NASCAR's first multi-time Cup Champion (Olivia)
- David Thompson (born 1954), NC State basketball player, led team to 1974 NCAA championship over UCLA, four-time NBA All-Star, member of Basketball Hall of Fame (Shelby)
- Wells Thompson (born 1983), former Major League Soccer player (Winston-Salem)
- Leigh Torrence (born 1982), cornerback for New Orleans Saints (Raleigh)
- Chad Tracy (born 1980), MLB third baseman (Charlotte)
- Kyle Troup (born 1991), professional ten-pin bowler (Taylorsville)
- R-Truth (born 1972), professional wrestler and rapper (Charlotte)
- P. J. Tucker (born 1985), player for Phoenix Suns and 2008 Israeli Basketball Premier League MVP (Raleigh)
- Norv Turner (born 1952), NFL head coach for San Diego Chargers, Washington Redskins, Oakland Raiders (Camp Lejeune)
- Brian Vickers (born 1983), NASCAR driver (Thomasville)
- Fred Vinson (born 1971), NBA player, assistant coach for New Orleans Hornets (Murfreesboro)
- Rube Walker (1926–1992), former MLB player and manager, two-time World Series Champion with the Brooklyn/Los Angeles Dodgers (Lenoir)
- John Wall (born 1990), NBA player, 5× NBA All-Star (Raleigh)
- Bob Warlick (1941–2005), NBA player (Hickory)
- Ernie Warlick (1932–2012), AFL tight end for the Buffalo Bills, 4× AFL All-Star and 2× AFL champion (Hickory)
- Adam Warren (born 1987), relief pitcher for New York Yankees (New Bern)
- Greg Warren (born 1981), long snapper for Pittsburgh Steelers (Goldsboro)
- T. J. Warren (born 1993), small forward for Phoenix Suns (Durham)
- Stephanie Watts (born 1997), WNBA player (Wesley Chapel)
- Carson Wentz (born 1992), NFL quarterback (Raleigh)
- Alex White (born 1988), pitcher for Cleveland Indians and Colorado Rockies (Greenville)
- Coby White (born 2000), NBA player (Goldsboro)
- Johnny White (born 1988), NFL running back for Buffalo Bills and Green Bay Packers (Asheville)
- Rex White (born 1929), former NASCAR Grand National Series champion (Taylorsville)
- Tyler White (born 1990), first baseman for the Los Angeles Dodgers (Mooresboro)
- Zamir White (born 1999), NFL running back, CFP national champion at Georgia (Laurinburg)
- Josh Whitesell (born 1983), former MLB first baseman (Durham)
- Hassan Whiteside (born 1989), power forward and center for Sacramento Kings (Gastonia)
- Chris Wilcox (born 1982), power forward/center for Boston Celtics (Raleigh)
- Hoyt Wilhelm (1923–2002), Baseball Hall of Fame pitcher, Baltimore Orioles Chicago White Sox (Huntersville)
- Damien Wilkins (born 1980), small forward and shooting guard for Detroit Pistons (Washington)
- Steve Wilks (born 1969), NFL coach (Charlotte)
- Brian Williams (born 1979), former NFL cornerback (High Point)
- Buck Williams (born 1960), NBA player for New Jersey Nets, Portland Trail Blazers, and New York Knicks, assistant coach for Trail Blazers; won 1982 NBA Rookie of the Year Award (Rocky Mount)
- C. J. Williams (born 1990), basketball player in the Israeli Basketball Premier League (Fayetteville)
- Jesse Williams (born 1983), track and field high jumper, 2011 World Champion (Raleigh)
- Mario Williams (born 1985), NC State football player, first ACC player selected No. 1 overall in NFL draft; 3× First-team All-Pro defensive end and 4× Pro Bowl selection (Richlands)
- Maxie Williams (1940–2009), NFL offensive lineman (Granite Falls)
- Perry Williams (born 1961), former cornerback for New York Giants (Hamlet)
- Roy Williams (born 1950), UNC-Chapel Hill men's basketball coach 2003–2021; led UNC-Chapel Hill to 2005, 2009, and 2017 NCAA basketball national championships (Spruce Pine)
- Zion Williamson (born 2000), NBA player for New Orleans Pelicans (Salisbury)
- Adrian Wilson (born 1979), All-Pro NFL safety, member of Arizona Cardinals Ring of Honor (High Point)
- C. J. Wilson (born 1987), defensive end for Green Bay Packers (Belhaven)
- Payton Wilson (born 2000), NFL linebacker, 2023 Butkus Award winner (Hillsborough)
- Alex Wood (born 1991), pitcher for Los Angeles Dodgers (Charlotte)
- Haywoode Workman (born 1966), former NBA player and referee (Charlotte)
- James Worthy (born 1961), basketball player for UNC-Chapel Hill, Most Valuable Player of 1982 NCAA basketball championship game, winner of three NBA titles with Los Angeles Lakers, broadcaster (Gastonia)
- Anthony Wright (born 1976), former NFL quarterback (Vanceboro)
- Debbie Yow (born 1950), former Athletic Director of Saint Louis, Maryland, and NC State (Gibsonville)
- Kay Yow (1942–2009), women's college basketball coach, member of the Women's Basketball Hall of Fame and Naismith Memorial Basketball Hall of Fame (Gibsonville)
- Tom Zachary (1896–1969), former MLB pitcher (Graham)
- Ryan Zimmerman (born 1984), All-Star third baseman for Washington Nationals (Washington)

== Writers ==
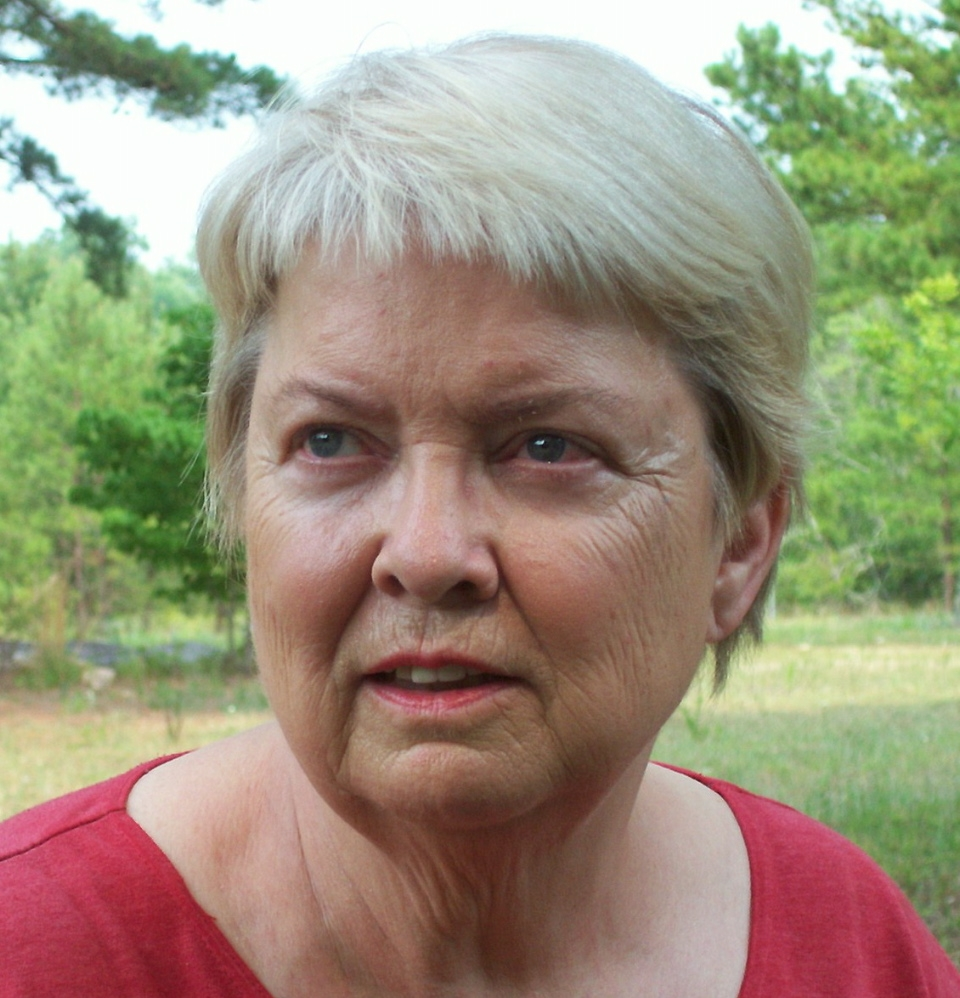
Margaret Maron

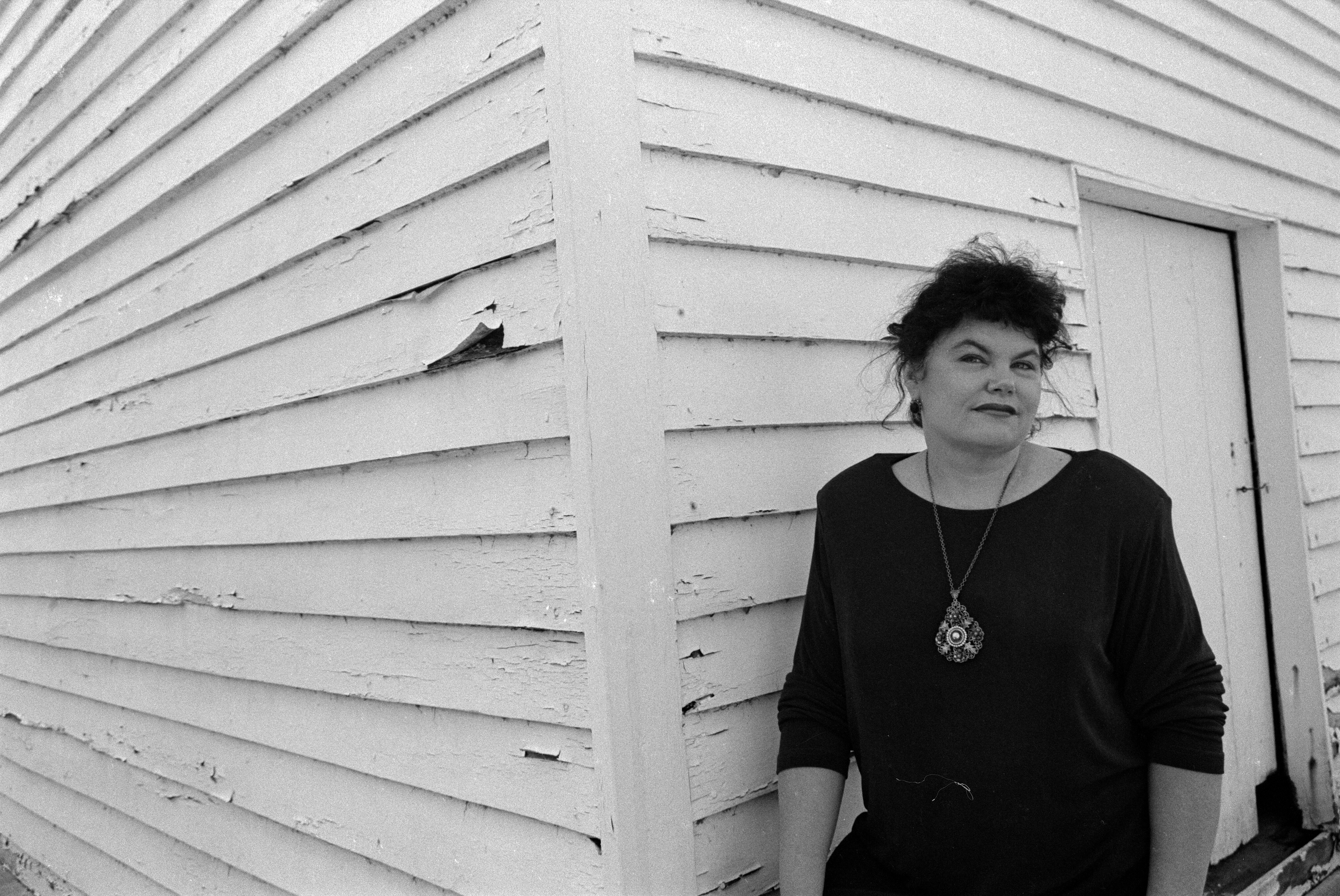
Sharyn McCrumb

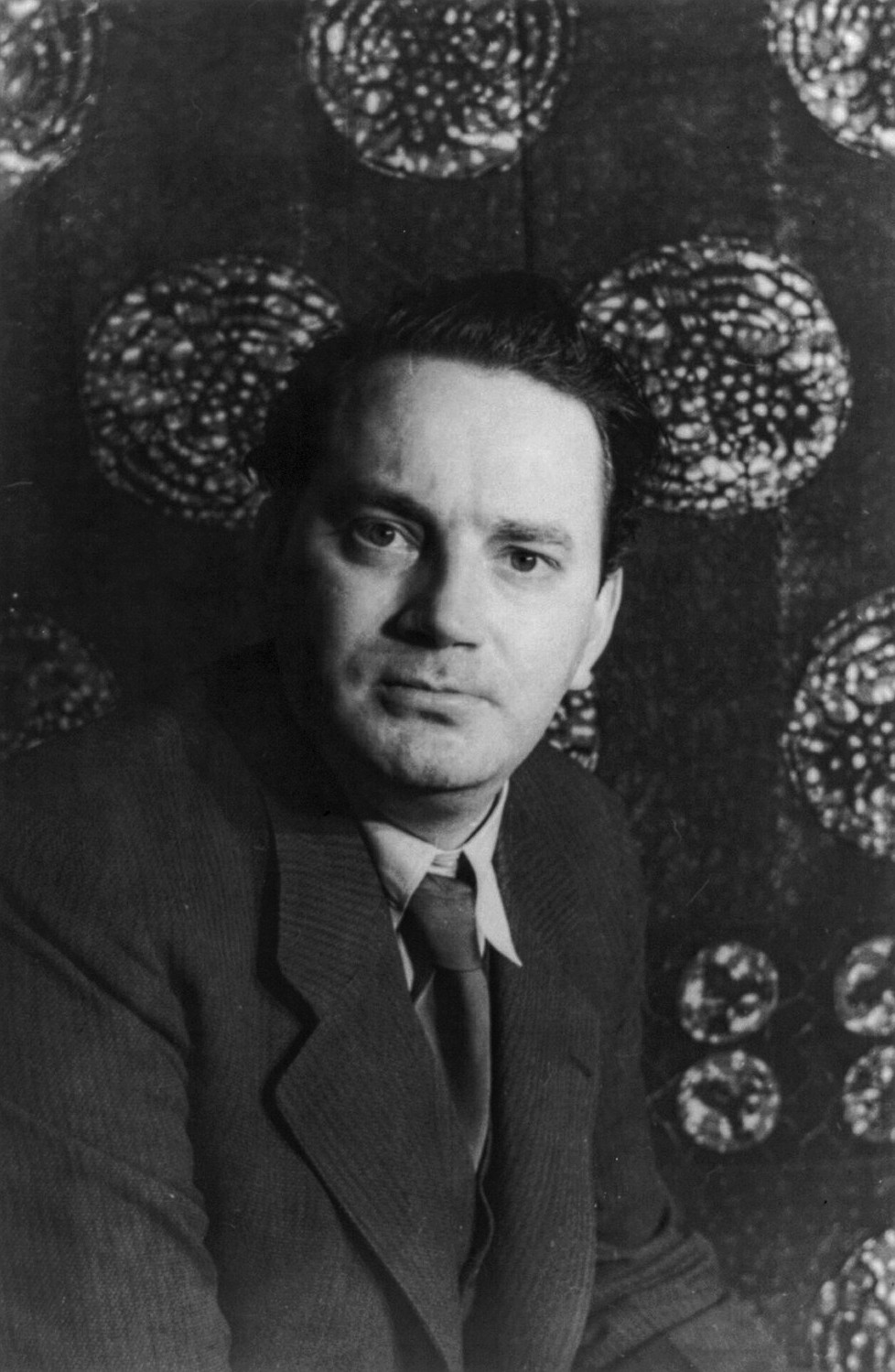
Thomas Wolfe

- Jason V. Brock (born 1970), author, artist, editor, filmmaker (Charlotte)
- Don Brown (born 1960), author, attorney, former naval officer (Plymouth)
- Betsy Byars (1928–2020), children's author (Charlotte)
- Wiley Cash, novelist (Gastonia)
- Fred Chappell (born 1936), author and North Carolina Poet Laureate 1997–2002 (Canton)
- Jennie Thornley Clarke (1860–1924), educator, writer, and anthologist
- Ellis Credle (1902–1998), author of books for children and young adults, including Down Down the Mountain (1934) (Hyde County)
- Sarah Dessen (born 1970), writer of novels for young adults (Chapel Hill)
- Thomas Dixon Jr. (1864–1946), author of The Clansman (Shelby)
- Fanny Murdaugh Downing (1831–1894), first resident novelist of Mecklenburg County
- Pamela Duncan (born 1961), novelist whose books often focus on working-class Southerners (Asheville)
- John Ehle (1925–2018), author (Asheville)
- Charles Frazier (born 1950), author of best-selling novel Cold Mountain (Asheville)
- Kaye Gibbons (born 1960), author of novels Ellen Foster and A Virtuous Woman (Rocky Mount)
- Jim Grimsley (born 1955), novelist and playwright (Pollocksville)
- O. Henry (William Sydney Porter; 1862–1910), prolific short story writer whose works include The Ransom of Red Chief and The Gift of the Magi (Greensboro)
- Jan Karon (born 1937), novelist (Hudson)
- Margaret Maron (1938–2021), author of mystery novels (Greensboro)
- Armistead Maupin (born 1944), writer known for his Tales of the City series of novels based in San Francisco (Raleigh)
- Sharyn McCrumb (born 1948), writer whose books celebrate the history and folklore of Appalachia (Wilmington)
- Tom Robbins (born 1932), author of best-selling novels including Even Cowgirls Get The Blues (Blowing Rock)
- Emily McGary Selinger (1848–1927), writer, poet (Wilmington)
- Theodore Taylor (1921–2006), author of more than 50 books for young adults including The Cay (Statesville)
- Timothy Tyson, historian at Duke University and author of the best-selling book Blood Done Sign My Name (Oxford)
- Sarah J. C. Whittlesey (1824–1896), author, poet, hymnwriter (Williamston)
- Thomas Wolfe (1900–1938), author of classic novels such as Look Homeward, Angel and You Can't Go Home Again (Asheville)

== Aviation and aerospace ==
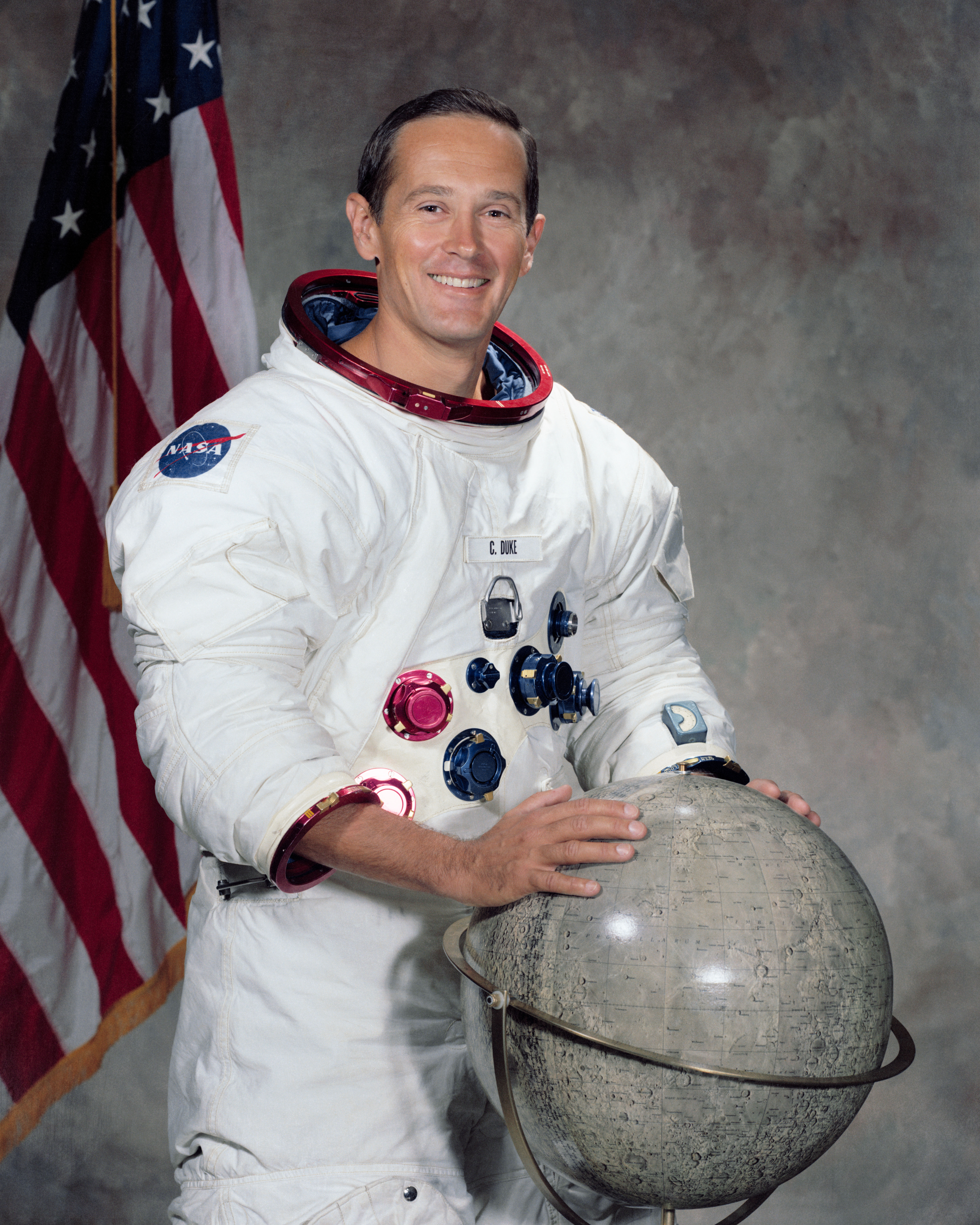
Charles Duke

Willie H. Fuller

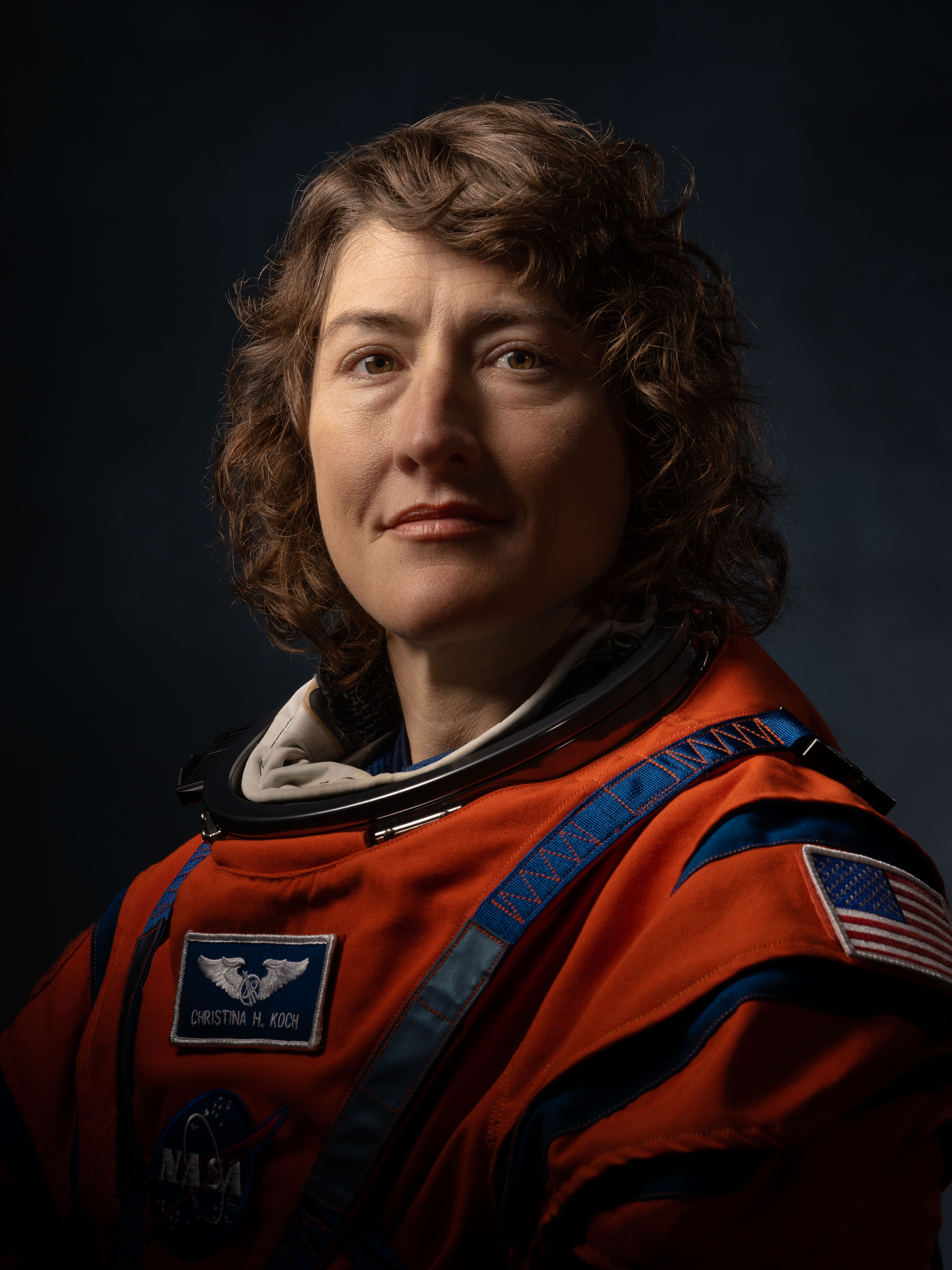
Christina Koch

- Sam Beddingfield (1933–2012), test pilot and NASA employee (Clayton)
- Curtis Brown (born 1956), former NASA astronaut and United States Air Force (USAF) colonel (Elizabethtown)
- Myrtle Cagle (1925–2019), pilot and flight test instructor, one of the Mercury 13 female astronauts group
- Charles Duke (born 1935), Apollo 16 astronaut; tenth and youngest person to walk on moon (Charlotte)
- Willie H. Fuller (1919–1995), combat fighter pilot and combat flight instructor with the 332d Expeditionary Operations Group 99th Pursuit Squadron, best known as the Tuskegee Airmen or "Red Tails" (Tarboro)
- Viola Gentry (1894–1988), aviator, set the first non-refueling endurance record for women (Rockingham)
- Caleb V. Haynes (1895–1966), USAF major general, air pioneer (Surry County)
- Susan Helms (born 1958), USAF lieutenant general and NASA astronaut (Charlotte)
- Christina Koch (born 1979), engineer and NASA astronaut (Jacksonville)
- William S. McArthur (born 1951), United States Army colonel, test pilot, and NASA astronaut (Laurinburg)
- George Preddy (1919–1944), USAF fighter ace (Greensboro)
- Edward F. Rector (1916–2001), USAF fighter ace, member of the Flying Tigers (Marshall)
- Ida Van Smith (1917–2003), pilot and flight instructor (Lumberton)
- William E. Thornton (1929–2021), NASA astronaut (Faison)
- Earl P. Yates (1923–2021), rear admiral in the United States Navy and United States Naval Aviator (Winston-Salem)

== Religious leaders ==
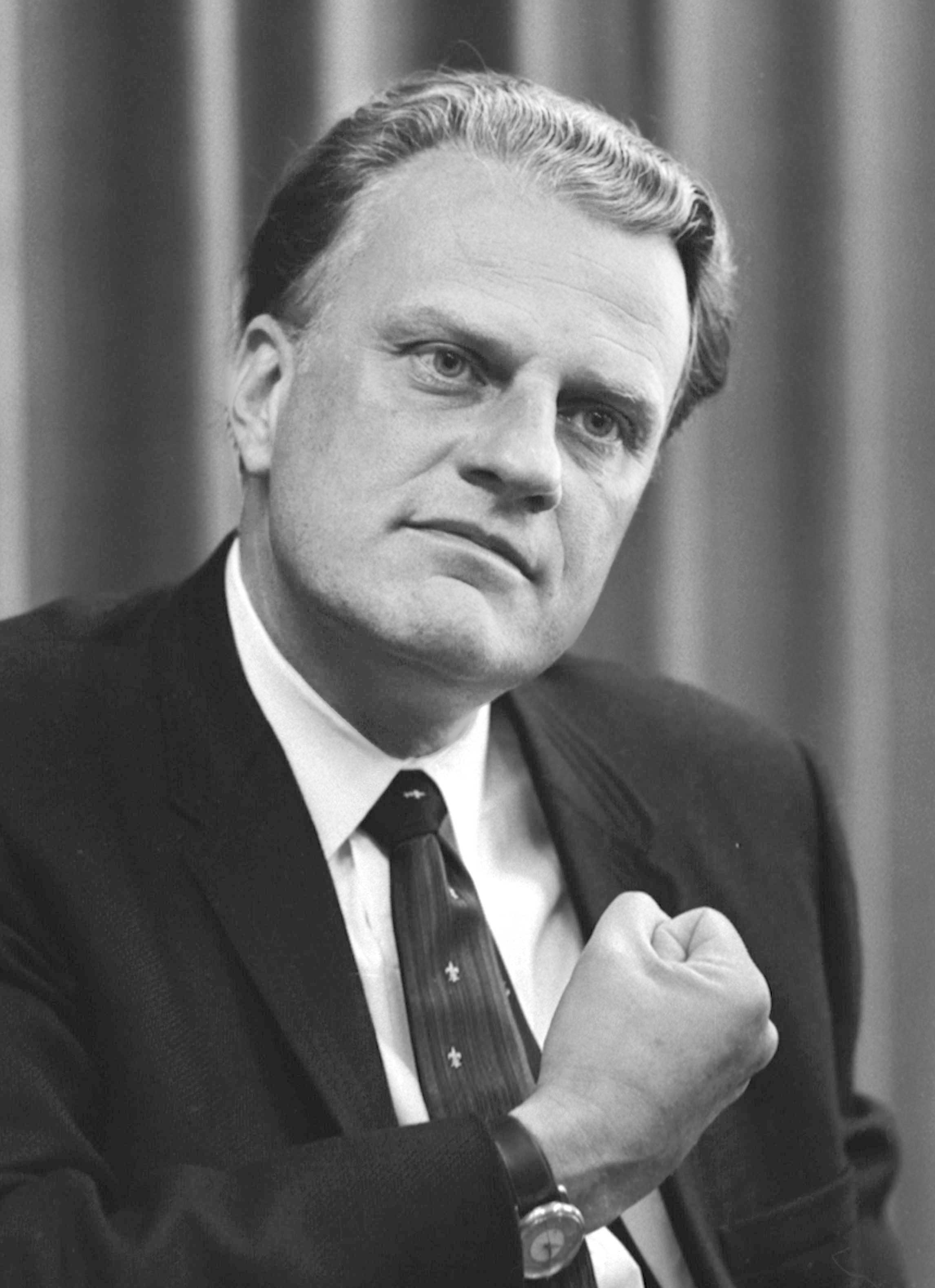
Billy Graham

- Ernest Angley (1921–2021), Christian evangelist and pastor of Grace Cathedral (Gastonia)
- William J. Barber II, minister and activist (Washington County)
- Leonard Bolick, pastor of the Evangelical Lutheran Church in America and served as the bishop of the North Carolina Evangelical Lutheran Synod 1997–2015 (Lenoir)
- Casey Cole, American Franciscan friar, Catholic priest, writer, and blogger (Cary)
- Billy Graham (1918–2018), Christian evangelist and unofficial religious advisor to U.S. presidents from Dwight D. Eisenhower to Bill Clinton (Charlotte)
- Franklin Graham (born 1952), Christian evangelist and missionary (Asheville)
- Anne Graham Lotz (born 1948), Christian evangelist and daughter of Billy Graham (Montreat)
- James A. Forbes (born 1935), minister (Raleigh)
- Paul Henkel (1754–1825), itinerant evangelist for the Lutheran Church (Rowan County)
- John P. Kee (born 1962), gospel singer and pastor (Durham)
- James McGready (1763–1817), Presbyterian minister and a revivalist during the Second Great Awakening (Guilford County)
- Owen L. W. Smith (1851–1926), minister and diplomat of the United States (Sampson County)
- Josephine Sprott (1867–1952), President, Woman's Christian Temperance Union of South Carolina (Greensboro)
- Ben Witherington III (born 1951), New Testament scholar (High Point)

== Miscellaneous ==
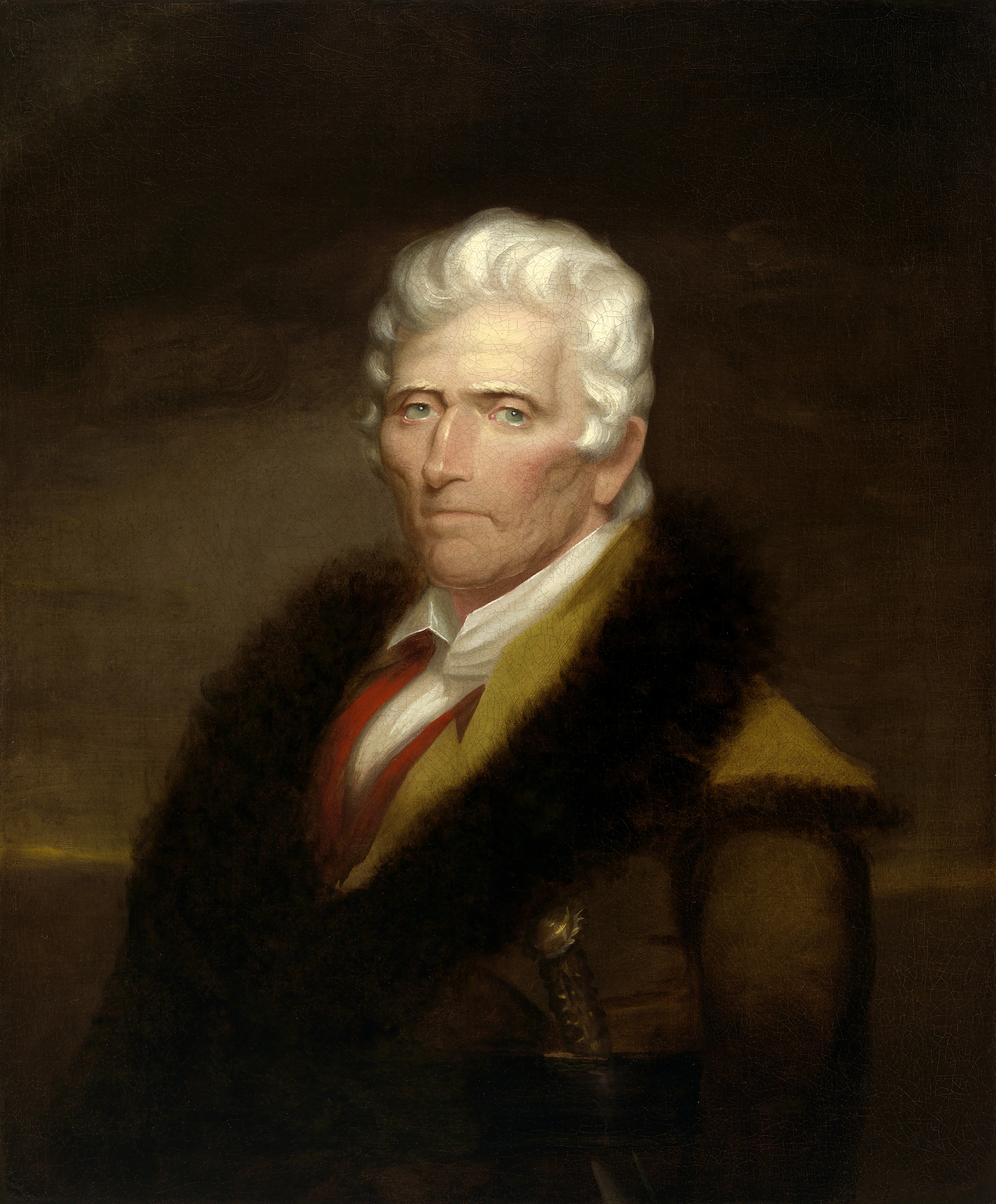
Daniel Boone

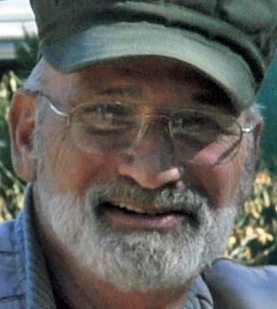
Dan McGalliard

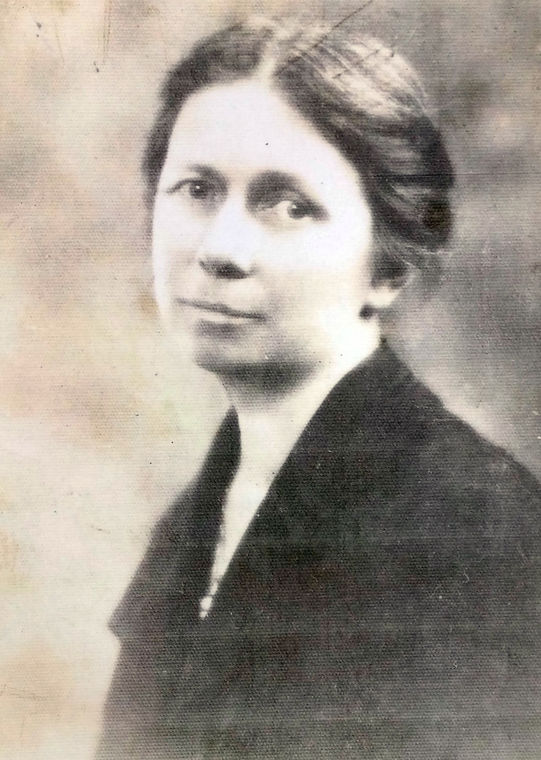
Mary T. Martin Sloop

- Louis H. Asbury (1877–1975), architect, many works listed on U.S. National Register of Historic Places (Charlotte)
- John David Roy Atchison (1954–2007), assistant US attorney and children's sports coach, committed suicide in prison after being charged with soliciting sex from a 5-year-old girl (Chapel Hill)
- Penelope Barker (1728–1796), activist in the American Revolution, helped organize the boycott of British goods in 1774 known as the Edenton Tea Party (Edenton)
- Norma Bonniwell (1877–1961), architect (Hickory)
- Daniel Boone (1734–1820), explorer, lived in the Yadkin River valley of western North Carolina for many years (Mocksville)
- Fred Brooks (born 1931), software engineer and computer scientist (Durham)
- Eliza Bryant (1827–1907), humanitarian (Wayne County)
- Judy Clarke (born 1952), criminal defense attorney in many high-profile cases (Asheville)
- John Cocke (1925–2002), computer scientist (Charlotte)
- Chelsea Cooley (born 1983), Miss USA 2005 (Mint Hill)
- Virginia Dare (1587–unknown), first person of English heritage born in the New World, in the Roanoke Colony, "The Lost Colony" (Roanoke Island)
- Jennifer Pharr Davis (born 1983), set record for quickest Appalachian Trail hike in 2011 (Hendersonville)
- Nia Franklin (born 1993), Miss America 2019 (Winston-Salem)
- Connie Guion (1882–1971), female physician, influential in developing health care systems (Lincolnton)
- Martha Hunt (born 1989), Model (Wilson)
- Adam Leroy Lane (born 1964), convicted murderer and serial killer (Jonesville)
- Jordan Lloyd (born 1986), reality television participant, winner of Big Brother 11 (Matthews)
- Leonard McBury, explorer of Tennessee
- Dan McGalliard (1940–2021), inventor and innovator (Burke County)
- Gideon Morris (1756–1798), trans-Appalachian pioneer and founder of Morristown, Tennessee (Randolph County)
- Benjamin Chavis Muhammad (born 1948), civil rights leader (Oxford)
- Misti Norris, chef and restaurateur
- Erica Payne, public policy expert, commentator, author and strategist (Raleigh)
- Elwood L. Perry (1915–2005), fishing lure inventor (Hickory)
- QCP (born 2000), chef, social media personality and cookbook author (Charlotte)
- Conrad Reed (1787–1845), found a large gold nugget while fishing, triggering the first gold rush in the United States (Midland)
- Rachel Reilly (born 1984), reality television participant, winner of Big Brother 13 (Concord)
- Dawud Salahuddin (born 1950), Muslim terrorist
- Afeni Shakur (1947–2016), former Black Panther, philanthropist, and mother of Tupac Shakur (Lumberton)
- Mary T. Martin Sloop (1873–1962), physician and educator (Davidson)
- David A. Smith (born 1957), computer scientist, specializing in interactive 3D (Camp Lejeune)
- Rye Barcott (born 1979), social entrepreneur and CEO of With Honor

== North Carolina residents later in life, raised elsewhere ==
A–L

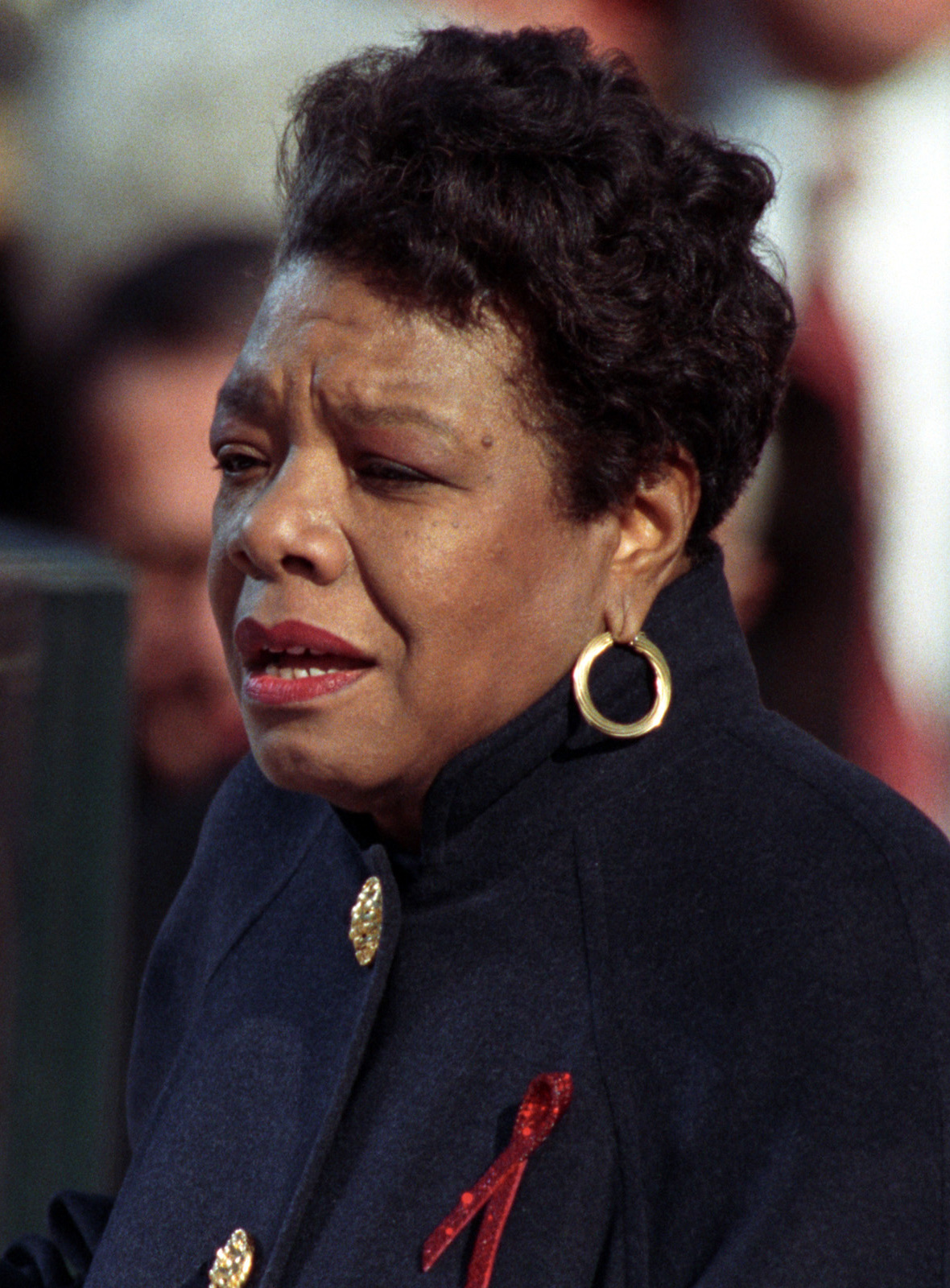
Maya Angelou

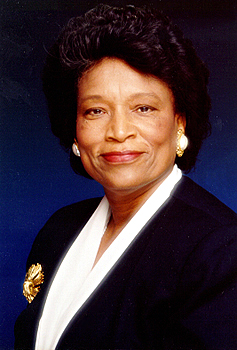
Eva Clayton

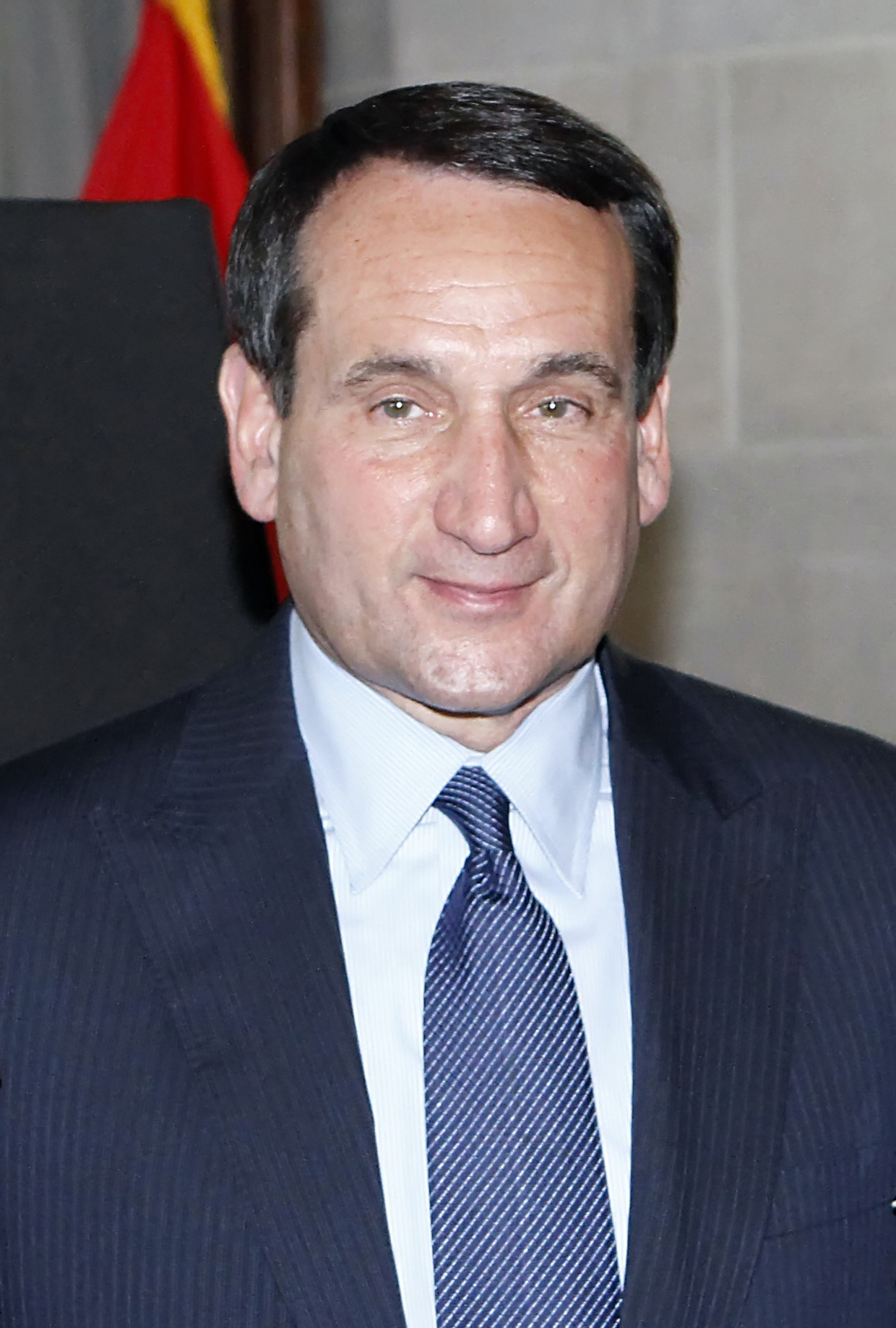
Mike Krzyzewski

- Harry Anderson (1952–2018), actor best known as Judge Harry Stone from the television series Night Court, 1984–1992 (Asheville)
- Maya Angelou (1928–2014), poet, historian, author, actress, playwright, producer, director, and professor at Wake Forest University (Winston-Salem)
- Joseph Bathanti (born 1953), poet, writer, professor; North Carolina Poet Laureate (Vilas)
- Frances Bavier (1902–1989), actress, the Andy Griffith Show (Siler City)
- Marshall Brain (1961–2024), technology expert and internet personality at HowStuffWorks.com (Raleigh)
- Chang and Eng Bunker (1811–1874), the original Siamese twins who performed for audiences in Asia, Europe, and North America before settling in the mountains of North Carolina and marrying two local sisters (Wilkesboro)
- Orson Scott Card (born 1951), lecturer and author of the award-winning science fiction book Ender's Game (Greensboro)
- John Carroll (1942–2015), journalist and newspaper editor for the Los Angeles Times and The Baltimore Sun (Winston-Salem)
- Eva Clayton (born 1934), U.S. congresswoman from North Carolina 1992–2003; she graduated from Johnson C. Smith University and North Carolina Central University
- Allison Hedge Coke (born 1958), American Book Award-winning author of Blood Run and other novels (raised in North Carolina, various counties)
- John Edwards (born 1953), former U.S. senator and 2004 Democratic vice-presidential nominee (Robbins)
- Renee Ellmers (born 1964), U.S. congresswoman from North Carolina 2011–2017 (Dunn)
- Ric Flair (born 1949), most decorated professional wrestling champion of all time (Charlotte)
- Robert Wilkie (born 1962), Defense Department leader and national security assistant to the president (Fayetteville)
- John Hope Franklin (1915–2009), historian and professor of African-American history at Duke University; also a civil-rights activist in the 1950s and 1960s (Durham)
- Harry Golden (1902–1981), Jewish-American humorist, writer and publisher of the Carolina Israelite; author, Only in America (Charlotte)
- T. Adelaide Goodno (1858–1931), president, North Carolina Woman's Christian Temperance Union
- Alex Grant, Scottish-born American poet, instructor (Chapel Hill)
- Bob Havens (born 1930), musician who played trombone for the Lawrence Welk orchestra, 1960–1983, born in Quincy, Illinois (Buies Creek)
- Joseph Hewes (1730–1779), signatory of the Declaration of Independence for North Carolina and first U.S. Secretary of the Navy (Edenton)
- Samantha Holvey (born 1986), Miss North Carolina USA 2006 (Buies Creek)
- Si Kahn (born 1944), singer-songwriter and activist, supporting numerous civil-rights and environmental causes with his music (Charlotte)
- Mike Krzyzewski (born 1947), long-time men's basketball coach for Duke University, garnering four NCAA basketball national championships (Durham)
- Linda Lavin, actress on TV sitcom Alice, lived in Wilmington in retirement, donated toward a local youth theater project
- Harvey Littleton (1922–2013), glass artist, founder of American Studio Glass movement (Spruce Pine)

M–Z

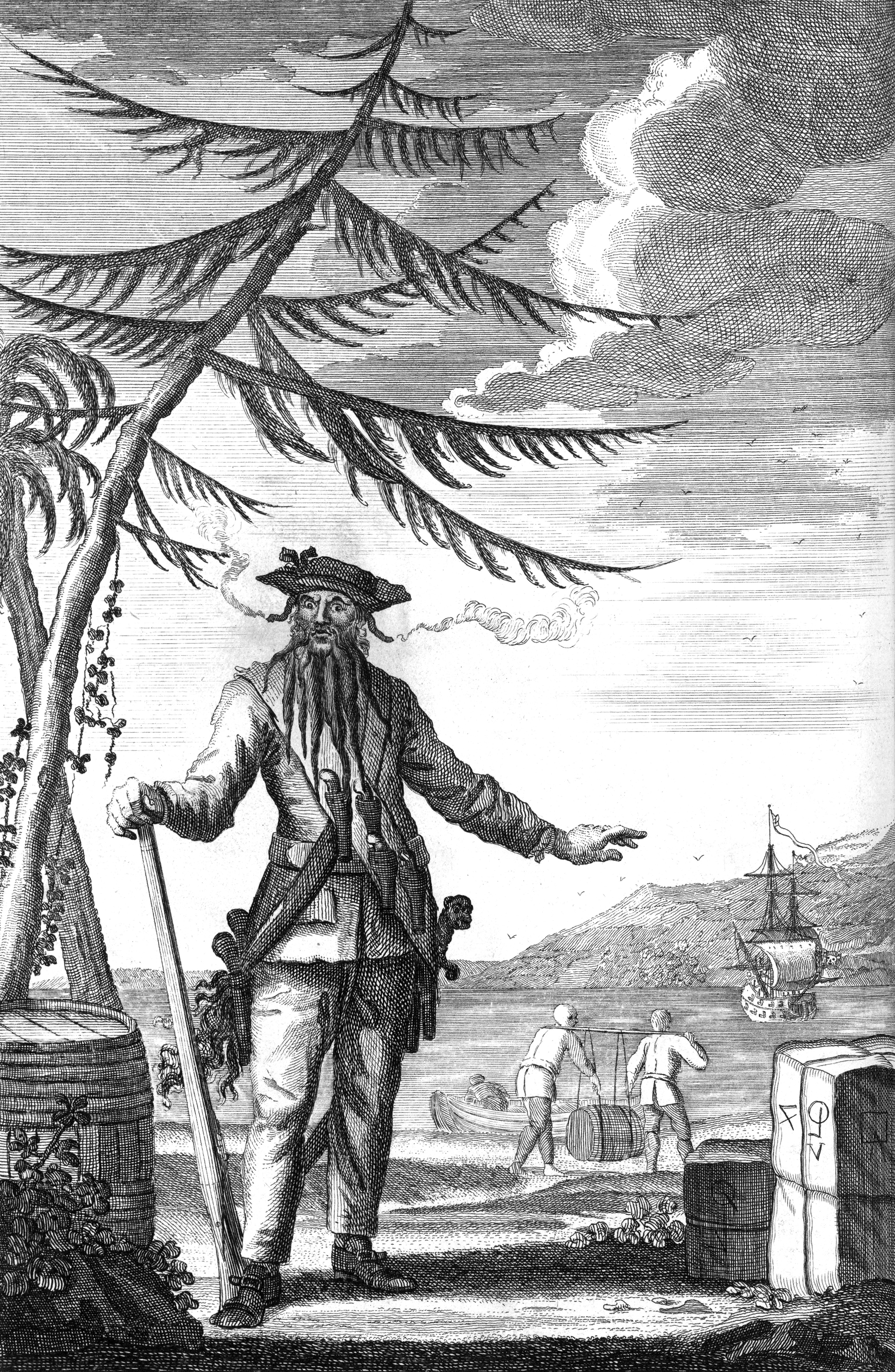
Blackbeard

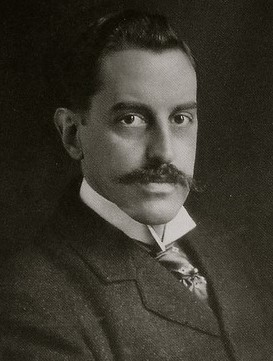
George Washington Vanderbilt II

- Wilmer Mizell (1930–1990), Major League Baseball pitcher and NC congressman (Midway)
- Sue Myrick (born 1941), mayor of Charlotte 1987–1991; U.S. congresswoman from North Carolina 1995–2013 (Charlotte)
- Michael Peterson (born 1943), novelist and convicted murderer; currently serving a life sentence for the 2003 murder of his wife (Durham)
- Tom Regan (1938–2017), philosopher and animal rights activist at North Carolina State University
- Kathy Reichs (born 1950), forensic anthropologist at the University of North Carolina, Chapel Hill; also the author of best-selling mystery novels featuring the character Temperance Brennan (Charlotte)
- Tony Rice (1951–2020), musician (Reidsville)
- Eric Rudolph (born 1966), anti-abortion terrorist currently serving five life sentences for the bombing at the 1996 Summer Olympics which killed one person and injured 111 others; eluded capture for 5 years (Murphy)
- Randolph Scott (1898–1987), film actor 1928–1962; his most enduring image is that of the tall-in-the-saddle Western hero; of his more than 100 film appearances, more than 60 were in Westerns (Charlotte)
- Dean Smith (1931–2015), retired men's basketball coach for the University of North Carolina, Chapel Hill; member of the National Collegiate Basketball Hall of Fame; earned 879 wins and two national championships in his career (Chapel Hill)
- Lee Smith (born 1944), author and instructor at North Carolina State University, winner of the O. Henry award for short-story writing (Hillsborough)
- Nicholas Sparks (born 1965), author of romance novels; born in Omaha, Nebraska and grew up in California (New Bern)
- Edward Teach (1680–1718), pirate known as Blackbeard, who kept his hide-out in the harbor of Ocracoke Island on North Carolina's Outer Banks (Ocracoke)
- John Tesh (born 1952), musician and television personality, best known as the host of the television series Entertainment Tonight 1986–1996 (Winston-Salem)
- George Washington Vanderbilt II (1862–1914), billionaire who created the Biltmore Estate in the North Carolina mountains, the largest privately owned mansion in the Western Hemisphere and North Carolina's top tourist attraction (Asheville)
- Blake R. Van Leer (1893–1956), president of Georgia Tech, inventor and civil rights advocate (Raleigh)
- Daniel Wallace (born 1959), author of the best-selling novel Big Fish: A Novel of Mythic Proportions (Chapel Hill)
- Hugh Williamson (1735–1819), physician; third NC signatory of the Constitution (Edenton)
- Kristi Yamaguchi (born 1971), figure skater and member of the U.S. Olympic Hall of Fame, former North Carolina resident (Raleigh)

== Spent time or studied in North Carolina ==
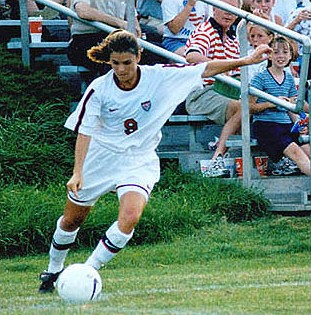
Mia Hamm

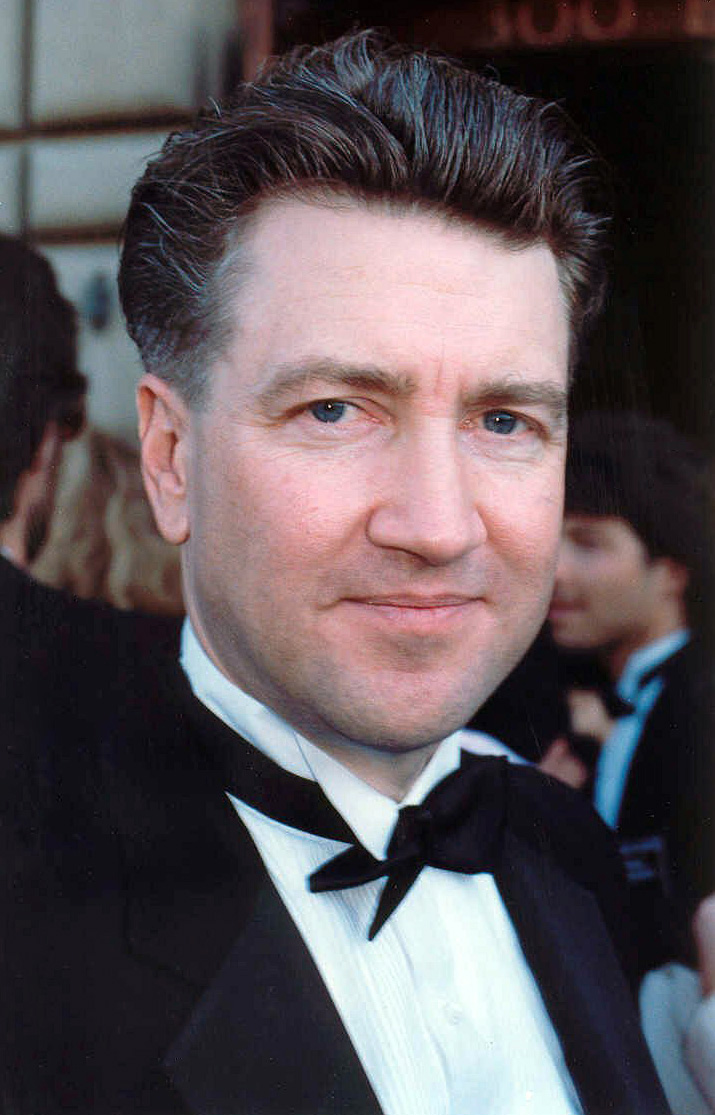
David Lynch

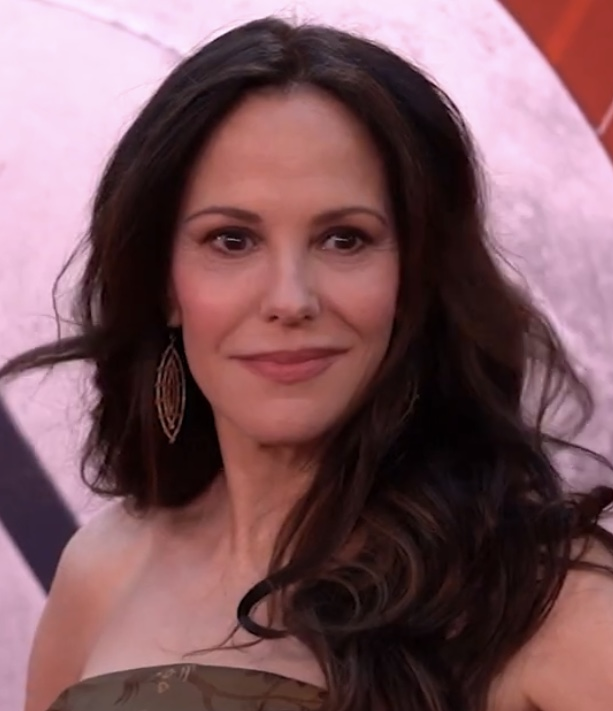
Mary-Louise Parker

- Mark Alarie (born 1963), former college basketball player for Duke University, played for the NBA's Denver Nuggets and Washington Bullets (Durham)
- Grayson Allen (born 1995), former college basketball player for Duke University, current NBA player (Durham)
- Sandra Bullock (born 1964), movie actress; attended East Carolina University (Greenville)
- Nick Cannon (born 1980), actor, comedian, television personality; graduated from Quail Hollow Middle School (Charlotte)
- Perry Como (1912–2001), popular crooner and host of the Perry Como Show, part-time resident of the NC mountains (near Asheville)
- Dan Cortese, MTV host, graduate of UNC-Chapel Hill (Chapel Hill)
- Joey Dorsey (born 1983), NBA basketball player for the Sacramento Kings and alumnus of Laurinburg Institute (Laurinburg)
- Lawrence Ferlinghetti (1919–2021), poet and owner-operator of the City Lights Bookstore famous for promoting the works of beatnik writers and poets; attended UNC Chapel Hill (Chapel Hill)
- Mia Hamm (born 1972), former soccer player for UNC-Chapel Hill, two-time Olympic gold medalist, twice named FIFA's World Player of the Year (Chapel Hill)
- Grant Hill (born 1972), former NBA player, graduated from Duke University (Durham)
- Kyrie Irving (born 1992), attended Duke University, NBA player (Durham)
- Jesse Jackson (1941–2026), politician, preacher, civil rights activist, graduated from North Carolina A&T State University (Greensboro)
- Marion Jones (born 1975), former basketball player for UNC-Chapel Hill and Olympic runner, winner of three gold medals at the 2000 Summer Olympics (Chapel Hill)
- Christian Laettner (born 1969), played college basketball for Duke University, former NBA Player (Durham)
- David Lynch (born 1946), film director and artist best known for directing the film Blue Velvet and the television series Twin Peaks, spent part of his childhood in NC (Durham)
- Khalid Sheikh Mohammed (born 1964 or 1965), terrorist known for masterminding the 9/11 attacks, attended Chowan College and obtained a degree from North Carolina Agricultural and Technical State University (Greensboro)
- Richard Nixon (1913–1994), 37th president of the United States, graduated from the Duke University School of Law in 1937 (Durham)
- Arnold Palmer (1929–2016), professional golfer and four-time winner of The Masters Tournament, attended Wake Forest University (Winston-Salem)
- Mary-Louise Parker (born 1964), film and television actress; graduated from the North Carolina School of the Arts; star of the film Fried Green Tomatoes and the television series The West Wing and Weeds; winner of Emmy, Tony, and Golden Globe awards (Winston-Salem)
- Missi Pyle (born 1972), film actress, graduated from the North Carolina School of the Arts, star of films such as Bringing Down the House, Charlie and the Chocolate Factory and Galaxy Quest (Winston-Salem)
- Philip Rivers (born 1981), star quarterback for North Carolina State University, set school records in passing yardage and touchdowns, currently the starting quarterback for the National Football League's San Diego Chargers team (Raleigh)
- Jada Pinkett Smith (born 1971), actress and singer, attended North Carolina School of the Arts, starred in the television series A Different World and in the movies The Nutty Professor, The Matrix Reloaded, and The Matrix Revolutions (Winston-Salem)
- Lawrence Taylor (born 1959), former football player for the New York Giants and member of the Pro Football Hall of Fame, All-America football player for UNC-Chapel Hill (Chapel Hill)

== See also ==
By location

- List of people from Asheville, North Carolina
- List of people from Charlotte, North Carolina
- List of people from Fayetteville, North Carolina
- List of people from Greensboro, North Carolina
- List of people from Raleigh, North Carolina
- List of people from Winston-Salem, North Carolina

By educational affiliation

- List of Davidson College people
- List of Duke University people
- List of East Carolina University alumni
- List of East Carolina University faculty
- List of North Carolina State University people
- List of University of North Carolina Wilmington alumni
- List of University of North Carolina at Chapel Hill alumni
- List of University of North Carolina at Chapel Hill leaders
- List of alumni of the University of North Carolina School of the Arts
- List of Wake Forest University people

Other

- Lists of Americans
- List of North Carolina suffragists
