= Leonard McBury =

North Carolina Militia officer

Colonel Leonard McBury was a North Carolina colonial militia officer who took part in early explorations of present-day Tennessee during the late 18th century.
