= North Carolina Tar Heels football statistical leaders =

The North Carolina Tar Heels football statistical leaders are individual statistical leaders of the North Carolina Tar Heels football program in various categories. These categories include passing, rushing, receiving, total offense, all-purpose yardage, defensive stats, and kicking. Within those areas, the lists identify single-game, single-season, and career leaders. The Tar Heels represent University of North Carolina at Chapel Hill in the NCAA's Atlantic Coast Conference.

Although North Carolina began competing in intercollegiate football in 1888, the school's official record generally does not include statistics from before the 1940s, as records from earlier years are often incomplete and inconsistent.

These lists are dominated by more recent players for several reasons:

- Since 1940s, seasons have increased from 10 games to 11 and then 12 games in length.
- The NCAA didn't allow freshmen to play varsity football until 1972 (with the exception of the World War II years), allowing players to have four-year careers.
- Bowl games only began counting toward single-season and career statistics in 2002.

These lists are updated through the 2025 season. Note that the NCAA does not officially recognize statistics for Hakeem Nicks and Deunta Williams, who were implicated in the scandal that caused the Tar Heels to retroactively forfeit all wins in the 2008 and 2009 seasons. However, the full stats of these players are listed in the school's media guide, and also here. The NCAA continues to recognize statistics from those seasons amassed by players who were not implicated in the scandal.

== Passing ==
=== Passing yards ===
Career
Rank	Player	Yards	Years
1	Sam Howell	10,283	2019 2020 2021
2	T. J. Yates	9,377	2007 2008 2009 2010
3	Darian Durant	8,755	2001 2002 2003 2004
4	Bryn Renner	8,221	2010 2011 2012 2013
5	Drake Maye	8,018	2021 2022 2023
6	Marquise Williams	7,965	2012 2013 2014 2015
7	Ronald Curry	4,987	1998 1999 2000 2001
8	Mitch Trubisky	4,752	2014 2015 2016
9	Jason Stanicek	4,683	1991 1992 1993 1994
10	Mike Thomas	4,368	1991 1992 1993 1994 1995

Single season
Rank	Player	Yards	Year
1	Drake Maye	4,321	2022
2	Mitch Trubisky	3,748	2016
3	Sam Howell	3,641	2019
4	Drake Maye	3,608	2023
5	Sam Howell	3,586	2020
6	T. J. Yates	3,418	2010
7	Bryn Renner	3,356	2012
8	Bryn Renner	3,086	2011
9	Marquise Williams	3,072	2015
10	Marquise Williams	3,068	2014

Single game
Rank	Player	Yards	Years	Opponent
1	Sam Howell	550	2020	Wake Forest
2	Marquise Williams	494	2015	Duke
3	Jacolby Criswell	475	2024	James Madison
4	Mitch Trubisky	453	2016	Pittsburgh
5	Drake Maye	448	2022	Wake Forest
6	Sam Howell	443	2020	Virginia
7	Drake Maye	442	2023	Syracuse
8	T. J. Yates	439	2010	Florida State
9	Mitch Trubisky	432	2016	James Madison
10	Darian Durant	417	2002	Arizona State

=== Passing touchdowns ===
Career
Rank	Player	TDs	Years
1	Sam Howell	92	2019 2020 2021
2	Darian Durant	68	2001 2002 2003 2004
3	Bryn Renner	64	2010 2011 2012 2013
4	Drake Maye	63	2021 2022 2023
5	Marquise Williams	61	2012 2013 2014 2015
6	T. J. Yates	58	2007 2008 2009 2010
7	Mitch Trubisky	41	2014 2015 2016
8	Chris Keldorf	35	1996 1997
9	Matt Kupec	33	1976 1977 1978 1979
10	Scott Stankavage	30	1980 1981 1982 1983

Single season
Rank	Player	TDs	Year
1	Sam Howell	38	2019
	Drake Maye	38	2022
3	Sam Howell	30	2020
	Mitch Trubisky	30	2016
5	Bryn Renner	28	2012
6	Bryn Renner	26	2011
7	Marquise Williams	24	2015
	Sam Howell	24	2021
	Drake Maye	24	2023
10	Chris Keldorf	23	1996

Single game
Rank	Player	TDs	Years	Opponent
1	Sam Howell	6	2020	Wake Forest
2	Kevin Anthony	5	1985	Wake Forest
	Darian Durant	5	2002	Arizona State
	Bryn Renner	5	2012	Louisville
	Bryn Renner	5	2012	Maryland
	Marquise Williams	5	2013	Old Dominion
	Mitch Trubisky	5	2016	Pittsburgh
	Sam Howell	5	2019	Virginia Tech
	Sam Howell	5	2021	Virginia
	Drake Maye	5	2022	FAMU
	Drake Maye	5	2022	Notre Dame
	Drake Maye	5	2022	Pittsburgh

== Rushing ==
=== Rushing yards ===
Career
Rank	Player	Yards	Years
1	Amos Lawrence	4,391	1977 1978 1979 1980
2	Mike Voight	3,971	1973 1974 1975 1976
3	Leon Johnson	3,693	1993 1994 1995 1996
4	Omarion Hampton	3,565	2022 2023 2024
5	Michael Carter	3,403	2017 2018 2019 2020
6	Kelvin Bryant	3,267	1979 1980 1981 1982
7	Don McCauley	3,172	1968 1969 1970
8	Ethan Horton	3,074	1981 1982 1983 1984
	Natrone Means	3,074	1990 1991 1992
10	Charlie Justice	2,634	1946 1947 1948 1949

Single season
Rank	Player	Yards	Year
1	Don McCauley	1,720	1970
2	Omarion Hampton	1,660	2024
3	Omarion Hampton	1,504	2023
4	Elijah Hood	1,463	2015
5	Mike Voight	1,407	1976
6	Giovani Bernard	1,253	2011
7	Mike Voight	1,250	1975
	Derrick Fenner	1,250	1986
9	Ethan Horton	1,247	1984
10	Michael Carter	1,245	2020

Single game
Rank	Player	Yards	Years	Opponent
1	Derrick Fenner	328	1986	Virginia
2	Michael Carter	308	2020	Miami
3	Kennard Martin	291	1988	Duke
4	Amos Lawrence	286	1977	Virginia
5	Don McCauley	279	1970	Duke
6	Giovani Bernard	262	2012	Virginia Tech
7	Mike Voight	261	1976	Duke
8	Natrone Means	256	1990	Duke
9	Natrone Means	249	1992	Maryland
10	Kelvin Bryant	247	1981	Duke

=== Rushing touchdowns ===
Career
Rank	Player	TDs	Years
1	Leon Johnson	43	1993 1994 1995 1996
2	Mike Voight	42	1973 1974 1975 1976
3	Omarion Hampton	36	2022 2023 2024
4	Marquise Williams	35	2012 2013 2014 2015
5	Natrone Means	34	1990 1991 1992
6	Kelvin Bryant	32	1979 1980 1981 1982
7	Javonte Williams	29	2018 2019 2020
	Don McCauley	29	1968 1969 1970
	Elijah Hood	29	2014 2015 2016
10	Charlie Justice	28	1946 1947 1948 1949
	Amos Lawrence	28	1977 1978 1979 1980

Single season
Rank	Player	TDs	Year
1	Don McCauley	19	1970
2	Javonte Williams	19	2020
3	Mike Voight	18	1976
4	Kelvin Bryant	17	1981
5	Elijah Hood	17	2015
6	Omarion Hampton	15	2023
	Omarion Hampton	15	2024
8	Leon Johnson	14	1993
9	Ty Chandler	13	2021
	Natrone Means	13	1992
	Giovani Bernard	13	2011
	Marquise Williams	13	2014
	Marquise Williams	13	2015

Single game
Rank	Player	TDs	Years	Opponent
1	Kelvin Bryant	6	1981	East Carolina

== Receiving ==
=== Receptions ===
Career
Rank	Player	Rec	Years
1	Ryan Switzer	244	2013 2014 2015 2016
2	Quinshad Davis	205	2012 2013 2014 2015
3	Josh Downs	202	2020 2021 2022
4	Dazz Newsome	188	2017 2018 2019 2020
5	Hakeem Nicks	181	2006 2007 2008
6	Jarwarski Pollock	177	2002 2003 2004 2005
7	Erik Highsmith	166	2009 2010 2011 2012
8	Na Brown	165	1995 1996 1997 1998
9	Corey Holliday	155	1990 1991 1992 1993
10	Dwight Jones	152	2008 2009 2010 2011

Single season
Rank	Player	Rec	Year
1	Josh Downs	101	2021
2	Ryan Switzer	96	2016
3	Josh Downs	94	2022
4	Dwight Jones	85	2011
5	Hakeem Nicks	74	2007
6	Dazz Newsome	72	2019
7	Jarwarski Pollock	71	2003
8	Sam Aiken	68	2002
	Hakeem Nicks	68	2008
10	Greg Little	62	2009
	Dwight Jones	62	2010
	Eric Ebron	62	2013

Single game
Rank	Player	Rec	Years	Opponent
1	Charlie Carr	16	1966	Air Force
	Quinshad Davis	16	2012	Virginia
	Ryan Switzer	16	2016	Pittsburgh
4	Josh Downs	15	2022	Virginia
	Nate McCollum	15	2023	Minnesota
6	Ryan Switzer	14	2016	Florida State
7	Ryan Switzer	13	2016	NC State
8	Bud Phillips	12	1966	Virginia
9	Earl Winfield	11	1985	LSU
	Leon Johnson	11	1995	Duke
	Jarwarski Pollock	11	2003	NC State
	Brooks Foster	11	2006	Rutgers
	Dwight Jones	11	2010	Duke
	Dyami Brown	11	2020	Virginia
	Josh Downs	11	2021	Miami (FL)
	Josh Downs	11	2022	Pittsburgh
	Josh Downs	11	2022	Wake Forest
	Josh Downs	11	2022	Clemson
	Devontez Walker	11	2023	Virginia

=== Receiving yards ===
Career
Rank	Player	Yards	Years
1	Ryan Switzer	2,907	2013 2014 2015 2016
2	Hakeem Nicks	2,840	2006 2007 2008
3	Quinshad Davis	2,614	2012 2013 2014 2015
4	Josh Downs	2,483	2020 2021 2022
5	Corey Holliday	2,447	1990 1991 1992 1993
6	Dazz Newsome	2,435	2017 2018 2019 2020
7	Octavus Barnes	2,398	1994 1995 1996 1997
8	Dyami Brown	2,306	2018 2019 2020
9	Sam Aiken	2,205	1999 2000 2001 2002
10	Dwight Jones	2,163	2008 2009 2010 2011

Single season
Rank	Player	Yards	Year
1	Josh Downs	1,335	2021
2	Hakeem Nicks	1,222	2008
3	Dwight Jones	1,196	2011
4	Ryan Switzer	1,112	2016
5	Dyami Brown	1,099	2020
6	Dyami Brown	1,034	2019
7	Josh Downs	1,029	2022
8	Dazz Newsome	1,018	2019
9	Sam Aiken	990	2002
10	Eric Ebron	973	2013

Single game
Rank	Player	Yards	Years	Opponent
1	Randy Marriott	247	1987	Georgia Tech
2	Dyami Brown	240	2020	Virginia
3	Dwight Jones	233	2010	Florida State
4	Jheranie Boyd	221	2010	LSU
5	Hakeem Nicks	217	2008	West Virginia
6	Octavus Barnes	211	1995	Ohio
7	Ryan Switzer	208	2016	Pittsburgh
8	Josh Downs	203	2021	Virginia
9	Dyami Brown	202	2019	Virginia
10	Eric Ebron	199	2013	Miami (FL)

=== Receiving touchdowns ===
Career
Rank	Player	TDs	Years
1	Quinshad Davis	25	2012 2013 2014 2015
2	Josh Downs	22	2020 2021 2022
3	Hakeem Nicks	21	2006 2007 2008
	Dyami Brown	21	2018 2019 2020
5	Mack Hollins	20	2013 2014 2015 2016
6	Octavus Barnes	19	1994 1995 1996 1997
	Ryan Switzer	19	2013 2014 2015 2016
8	Art Weiner	18	1946 1947 1948 1949
	Bug Howard	18	2013 2014 2015 2016
	Dazz Newsome	18	2017 2018 2019 2020

Single season
Rank	Player	TDs	Year
1	Hakeem Nicks	12	2008
	Dwight Jones	12	2011
	Dyami Brown	12	2019
4	Josh Downs	11	2022
5	Quinshad Davis	10	2013
	Dazz Newsome	10	2019
7	Marcus Wall	9	1994
8	Mike Chatham	8	1979
	Mark Smith	8	1983
	Earl Winfield	8	1985
	Sam Aiken	8	2001
	Mack Hollins	8	2014
	Mack Hollins	8	2015
	Bug Howard	8	2016
	Dyami Brown	8	2020
	Josh Downs	8	2021

Single game
Rank	Player	TDs	Years	Opponent
1	Chesley Borders	4	2002	Arizona State

== Total offense ==
Total offense is the sum of passing and rushing statistics. It does not include receiving or returns.

=== Total offense yards ===
Career
Rank	Player	Yards	Years
1	Sam Howell	11,292	2019 2020 2021
2	Marquise Williams	10,423	2012 2013 2014 2015
3	Darian Durant	9,630	2001 2002 2003 2004
4	Drake Maye	9,227	2021 2022 2023
5	T. J. Yates	9,044	2007 2008 2009 2010
6	Bryn Renner	8,128	2010 2011 2012 2013
7	Ronald Curry	6,236	1998 1999 2000 2001
8	Jason Stanicek	5,497	1991 1992 1993 1994
9	Mitch Trubisky	5,191	2014 2015 2016
10	Mike Thomas	4,653	1991 1992 1993 1994 1995

Single season
Rank	Player	Yards	Year
1	Drake Maye	5,019	2022
2	Drake Maye	4,057	2023
3	Mitch Trubisky	4,056	2016
4	Marquise Williams	4,020	2015
5	Sam Howell	3,884	2021
6	Marquise Williams	3,856	2014
7	Sam Howell	3,732	2020
8	Sam Howell	3,676	2019
9	Bryn Renner	3,394	2012
10	T. J. Yates	3,341	2010

Single game
Rank	Player	Yards	Years	Opponent
1	Sam Howell	571	2020	Wake Forest
2	Marquise Williams	524	2015	Duke
3	Drake Maye	519	2022	Wake Forest
4	Drake Maye	497	2023	Syracuse
5	Jacolby Criswell	480	2024	James Madison
6	Marquise Williams	469	2013	Old Dominion
7	Marquise Williams	463	2014	Georgia Tech
8	Mitch Trubisky	458	2016	James Madison
9	Sam Howell	456	2021	Georgia State
10	Drake Maye	450	2022	Duke

=== Touchdowns responsible for ===
In official NCAA records, "touchdowns responsible for" includes rushing and passing touchdowns, but not receptions or returns—the same statistical categories used to measure total offense.

Career
Rank	Player	TDs	Years
1	Sam Howell	109	2019 2020 2021
2	Marquise Williams	96	2012 2013 2014 2015
3	Darian Durant	79	2001 2002 2003 2004
	Drake Maye	79	2021 2022 2023
5	Bryn Renner	68	2010 2011 2012 2013
6	T. J. Yates	65	2007 2008 2009 2010
7	Charlie Justice	53	1946 1947 1948 1949
8	Mitch Trubisky	49	2014 2015 2016
9	Leon Johnson	44	1993 1994 1995 1996
10	Mike Voight	42	1973 1974 1975 1976

Single season
Rank	Player	TDs	Year
1	Drake Maye	45	2022
2	Sam Howell	39	2019
3	Marquise Williams	37	2015
4	Sam Howell	35	2020
	Mitch Trubisky	35	2016
	Sam Howell	35	2021
7	Marquise Williams	34	2014
8	Drake Maye	33	2023
9	Bryn Renner	29	2012
10	Bryn Renner	27	2011

Single game
Rank	Player	TDs	Years	Opponent
1	Sam Howell	7	2020	Wake Forest
2	Kelvin Bryant	6	1981	East Carolina

== All-purpose yardage ==
All-purpose yardage is the sum of all yards credited to a player who is in possession of the ball. It includes rushing, receiving, and returns, but does not include passing.

North Carolina's media guide fully lists career and single-season leaders in all-purpose yards, but does not break down their performances by type of play. It only lists the single-game leader, but does fully break down his performance.

Career
Rank	Player	Yards	Years
1	Leon Johnson	5,828	1993 1994 1995 1996
2	Don McCauley	5,014	1968 1969 1970
3	Amos Lawrence	4,928	1977 1978 1979 1980
4	T. J. Logan	4,926	2013 2014 2015 2016
5	Brandon Tate	4,744	2005 2006 2007 2008
6	Michael Carter	4,710	2017 2018 2019 2020
7	Charlie Justice	4,670	1946 1947 1948 1949
8	Mike Voight	4,472	1973 1974 1975 1976
9	Eric Blount	4,391	1988 1989 1990 1991
10	Omarion Hampton	4,351	2022 2023 2024

Single season
Rank	Player	Yards	Year
1	Omarion Hampton	2,033	2024
2	Don McCauley	2,021	1970
3	Giovani Bernard	1,981	2012
4	Leon Johnson	1,832	1996
5	Don McCauley	1,770	1969
6	Brandon Tate	1,765	2007
7	Omarion Hampton	1,726	2023
8	James Betterson	1,647	1974
9	Giovani Bernard	1,615	2011
10	T. J. Logan	1,584	2016

Single game
Rank	Player	Yards	Years	Opponent
1	Brandon Tate	397	2009	McNeese State

== Defense ==
=== Interceptions ===
Career
Rank	Player	Ints	Years
1	Dré Bly	20	1996 1997 1998
2	Lou Angelo	16	1970 1971 1972
3	Tre Boston	13	2010 2011 2012 2013
4	Buddy Curry	12	1976 1977 1978 1979
	Bobby Cale	12	1975 1976 1977 1978
	Trimane Goddard	12	2004 2005 2007 2008
	Deunta Williams	12	2007 2008 2009 2010
8	Steve Streater	11	1978 1979 1980

Single season
Rank	Player	Ints	Year
1	Dré Bly	11	1996
2	Lou Angelo	8	1972
3	Junior Edge	7	1961
	Trimane Goddard	7	2008
5	Don Jackson	6	1935
	Dick Bunting	6	1949
	Walter Black	6	1981
	Larry Griffin	6	1985
	Derrick Donald	6	1986
	Deunta Williams	6	2009

Single game
Rank	Player	Ints	Years	Opponent
1	Don Jackson	4	1935	Tennessee

=== Tackles ===
Career
Rank	Player	Tackles	Years
1	not listed in media guide		

Single season
Rank	Player	Tackles	Year
1	Buddy Curry	171	1979
2	Dexter Reid	166	2002
3	Troy Simmons	162	1984
	Carl Carr	162	1985
	Brett Rudolph	162	1985
6	Dwight Hollier	159	1989
7	Buddy Curry	155	1978
	Dwight Hollier	155	1990
9	Micah Moon	153	1984
10	Darrell Nicholson	147	1979

=== Sacks ===
Career
Rank	Player	Sacks	Years
1	Greg Ellis	32.5	1994 1995 1996 1997
2	Julius Peppers	30.5	1999 2000 2001
3	Tomon Fox	30	2016 2017 2018 2019 2020 2021
4	Quinton Coples	24.0	2008 2009 2010 2011
	Marcus Jones	24.0	1992 1993 1994 1995
6	Kaimon Rucker	22.0	2020 2021 2022 2023 2024
7	Lawrence Taylor	21.0	1978 1979 1980
8	William Fuller	20.0	1980 1981 1982 1983
9	Kareem Martin	19.5	2010 2011 2012 2013
10	Hilee Taylor	19.0	2004 2005 2006 2007

Single season
Rank	Player	Sacks	Year
1	Lawrence Taylor	16.0	1980
2	Julius Peppers	15.0	2000
3	Greg Ellis	12.5	1996
4	Kareem Martin	11.5	2013
5	Robert Quinn	11.0	2009
6	Hilee Taylor	10.5	2007
	Melkart Abou Jaoude	10.5	2025
8	Quinton Coples	10.0	2010
9	Julius Peppers	9.5	2001
10	William Fuller	9.0	1981
	Greg Ellis	9.0	1997
	Tomon Fox	9.0	2021

Single game
Rank	Player	Sacks	Years	Opponent
1	Julius Peppers	4.0	2001	Virginia
2	Kareem Martin	3.5	2013	Pittsburgh
	Beau Atkinson	3.5	2024	Florida State

== Kicking ==
=== Field goals made ===
Career
Rank	Player	FGs	Years
1	Casey Barth	66	2008 2009 2010 2011 2012
2	Connor Barth	54	2004 2005 2006 2007
3	Josh McGee	52	1996 1997 1998 1999
4	Noah Burnette	49	2022 2023 2024
5	Clint Gwaltney	43	1988 1989 1990 1991
6	Nick Weiler	40	2013 2014 2015 2016
7	Tripp Pignetti	38	1991 1992 1993 1994
8	Brooks Barwick	37	1981 1982 1983
9	Kenny Miller	34	1984 1985 1986 1987
	Tom Biddle	34	1975 1976 1977

Single season
Rank	Player	FGs	Year
1	Clint Gwaltney	21	1990
	Casey Barth	21	2009
3	Brooks Barwick	20	1982
	Nick Weiler	20	2015
5	Connor Barth	19	2007
	Casey Barth	19	2010
	Noah Ruggles	19	2019
	Grayson Atkins	19	2021
	Noah Burnette	19	2023
	Rece Verhoff	19	2025

Single game
Rank	Player	FGs	Years	Opponent
1	Josh McGee	6	1999	Duke
	Noah Burnette	6	2023	Duke
