= 2015 North Carolina Tar Heels football team =

American college football season

2015 North Carolina Tar Heels football

ACC Coastal Division champion

ACC Championship Game, L 37–45 vs. Clemson

Russell Athletic Bowl, L 38–49 vs. Baylor
- Conference: Atlantic Coast Conference
- Coastal Division

Ranking
- Coaches: No. 15
- AP: No. 15
- Record: 11–3 (8–0 ACC)
- Head coach: Larry Fedora (4th season)
- Offensive coordinator: Seth Littrell (2nd season)
- Offensive scheme: Spread
- Defensive coordinator: Gene Chizik (1st season)
- Base defense: 4–3
- Captains: Marquise Williams; Landon Turner; Shakeel Rashad; Jeff Schoettmer; Mack Hollins
- Home stadium: Kenan Memorial Stadium

Uniform
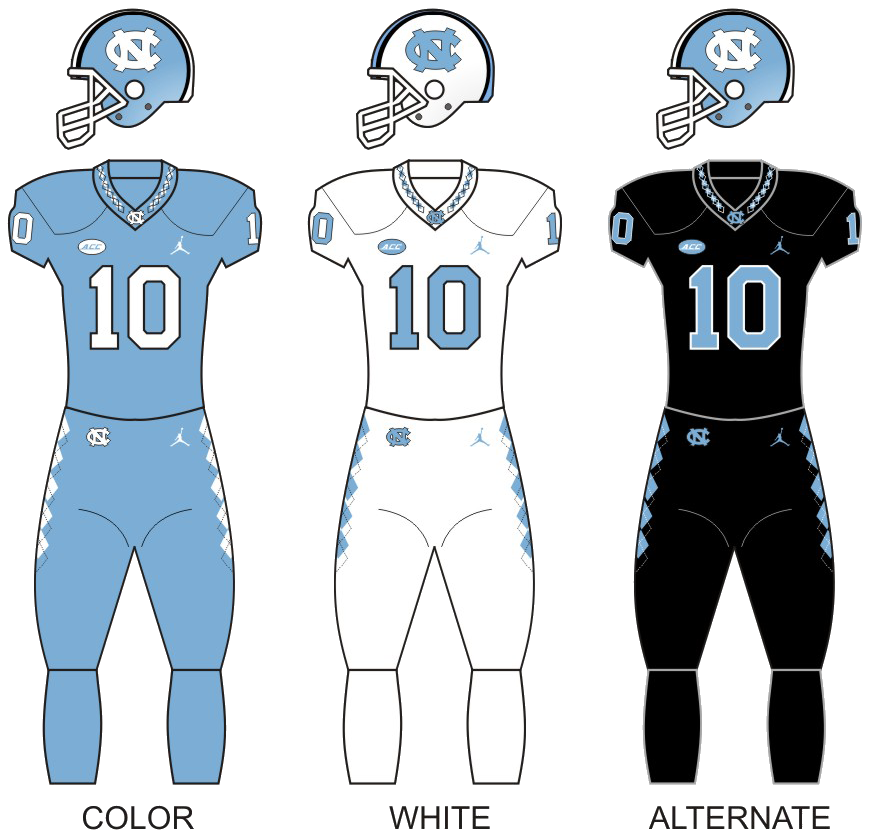

2015 Atlantic Coast Conference football standings
	Conf.			Overall
Team	W		L	W		L
Atlantic Division
No. 2 Clemson x$^	8	–	0	14	–	1
No. 14 Florida State	6	–	2	10	–	3
Louisville	5	–	3	8	–	5
NC State	3	–	5	7	–	6
Syracuse	2	–	6	4	–	8
Wake Forest	1	–	7	3	–	9
Boston College	0	–	8	3	–	9
Coastal Division
No. 15 North Carolina x	8	–	0	11	–	3
Pittsburgh	6	–	2	8	–	5
Miami (FL)	5	–	3	8	–	5
Duke	4	–	4	8	–	5
Virginia Tech	4	–	4	7	–	6
Virginia	3	–	5	4	–	8
Georgia Tech	1	–	7	3	–	9
Championship: Clemson 45, North Carolina 37
^ – College Football Playoff participant; $ – Conference champion; x – Division champion/co-champions; Rankings from AP Poll

The 2015 North Carolina Tar Heels football team represented the University of North Carolina at Chapel Hill as a member of Coastal Division of the Atlantic Coast Conference (ACC) during the 2015 NCAA Division I FBS football season. The team was led by fourth-year head coach Larry Fedora and played their home games at Kenan Memorial Stadium. North Carolina finished the season 11–3 overall and 8–0 in ACC play to win the ACC Coastal Division title. They represented the Coastal Division in the ACC Championship Game, where they lost to Atlantic Division champion Clemson. They were invited to the Russell Athletic Bowl, where they lost to Baylor.

== Recruiting ==
National Signing Day was on February 4, 2015, and was the first chance for high school seniors to officially declare which university or college they will be attending for their college career. North Carolina had 19 high school seniors sign a National Letter of Intent to play football with them. Of the class, 10 athletes enrolled early to UNC.

College recruiting information (2015)
Name	Hometown	School	Height	Weight	40^{‡}	Commit date
Jake Bargas; TE	Boca Raton, FL	St. Andrew's School	6 ft 4 in (1.93 m)	225 lb (102 kg)	4.7	Jan 19, 2015
Jake Bargas; TE	Recruit ratings: Scout: Rivals: 247Sports: ESPN: (77)					
Corey Bell; DB	Charlotte, NC	Hough HS	5 ft 9 in (1.75 m)	158 lb (72 kg)	-	Mar 18, 2014
Corey Bell; DB	Recruit ratings: Scout: Rivals: 247Sports: ESPN: (75)					
J. K. Britt; ATH	Newnan, GA	Newnan HS	5 ft 11 in (1.80 m)	187 lb (85 kg)	-	Jun 30, 2014
J. K. Britt; ATH	Recruit ratings: Scout: Rivals: 247Sports: ESPN: (78)					
Aaron Crawford; DT	Ashburn, VA	Stone Bridge HS	6 ft 0 in (1.83 m)	303 lb (137 kg)	-	May 20, 2014
Aaron Crawford; DT	Recruit ratings: Scout: Rivals: 247Sports: ESPN: (78)					
Jalen Dalton; DE	Clemmons, NC	West Forsyth HS	6 ft 6 in (1.98 m)	230 lb (100 kg)	-	Nov 13, 2014
Jalen Dalton; DE	Recruit ratings: Scout: Rivals: 247Sports: ESPN: (84)					
Nathan Elliott; QB	Celina, TX	Celina HS	6 ft 1 in (1.85 m)	190 lb (86 kg)	-	Apr 18, 2014
Nathan Elliott; QB	Recruit ratings: Scout: Rivals: 247Sports: ESPN: (76)					
Tommy Hatton; OC	Montvale, NJ	St. Joseph's HS	6 ft 3 in (1.91 m)	280 lb (130 kg)	-	Jun 13, 2014
Tommy Hatton; OC	Recruit ratings: Scout: Rivals: 247Sports: ESPN: (82)					
Charlie Heck; OT	Kansas City, MO	Rockhurst HS	6 ft 7 in (2.01 m)	250 lb (110 kg)	-	Dec 1, 2014
Charlie Heck; OT	Recruit ratings: Scout: Rivals: 247Sports: ESPN: (73)					
Mike Hughes; CB	New Bern, NC	New Bern HS	5 ft 10 in (1.78 m)	160 lb (73 kg)	-	Dec 22, 2014
Mike Hughes; CB	Recruit ratings: Scout: Rivals: 247Sports: ESPN: (80)					
Juval Mollette; WR	Randleman, NC	Randleman HS	6 ft 4 in (1.93 m)	186 lb (84 kg)	-	Jun 21, 2014
Juval Mollette; WR	Recruit ratings: Scout: Rivals: 247Sports: ESPN: (80)					
Nick Polino; OG	Buford, GA	Buford HS	6 ft 4 in (1.93 m)	270 lb (120 kg)	-	Jun 22, 2014
Nick Polino; OG	Recruit ratings: Scout: Rivals: 247Sports: ESPN: (78)					
Anthony Ratliff-Williams; QB	Matthews, NC	Butler HS	6 ft 2 in (1.88 m)	195 lb (88 kg)	-	Mar 10, 2014
Anthony Ratliff-Williams; QB	Recruit ratings: Scout: Rivals: 247Sports: ESPN: (77)					
Andre Smith; LB	Jacksonville, FL	Trinity Christian HS	6 ft 0 in (1.83 m)	225 lb (102 kg)	-	Dec 12, 2014
Andre Smith; LB	Recruit ratings: Scout: Rivals: 247Sports: ESPN: (79)					
Jason Strowbridge; DE	Deerfield Beach, FL	Deerfield Beach HS	6 ft 4 in (1.93 m)	245 lb (111 kg)	4.9	Feb 2, 2015
Jason Strowbridge; DE	Recruit ratings: Scout: Rivals: 247Sports: ESPN: (80)					
Johnathon Sutton; LB	Swansea, SC	Swansea HS	5 ft 11 in (1.80 m)	214 lb (97 kg)	-	Jun 21, 2014
Johnathon Sutton; LB	Recruit ratings: Scout: Rivals: 247Sports: ESPN: (80)					
William Sweet; OT	Jacksonville, FL	First Coast HS	6 ft 7 in (2.01 m)	280 lb (130 kg)	-	Apr 12, 2014
William Sweet; OT	Recruit ratings: Scout: Rivals: 247Sports: ESPN: (80)					
Carl Tucker; TE	Huntersville, NC	Hough HS	6 ft 7 in (2.01 m)	280 lb (130 kg)	-	Apr 12, 2014
Carl Tucker; TE	Recruit ratings: Scout: Rivals: 247Sports: ESPN: (81)					
Mason Veal; OG	Charlotte, NC	Ardrey Kell HS	6 ft 5 in (1.96 m)	295 lb (134 kg)	-	Mar 28, 2014
Mason Veal; OG	Recruit ratings: Scout: Rivals: 247Sports: ESPN: (80)					
Ty'Son Williams; RB	Sumter, SC	Crestwood HS	5 ft 11 in (1.80 m)	202 lb (92 kg)	4.6	Jul 29, 2014
Ty'Son Williams; RB	Recruit ratings: Scout: Rivals: 247Sports: ESPN: (82)					
Overall recruit ranking: Scout: 24 Rivals: 28 247Sports: 28 ESPN: 24
‡ Refers to 40-yard dash; Note: In many cases, Scout, Rivals, 247Sports, On3, and ESPN may conflict in their listings of height, weight and 40 time.; In these cases, the average was taken. ESPN grades are on a 100-point scale.; Sources: "North Carolina Football Commitment List (19)". Rivals.; "North Carolina Tar Heels 2015 Player Commits". ESPN.; "2015 Team Ranking". Rivals.com.; "North Carolina 2015 Football Commits". 247Sports.

== Schedule ==
Date	Time	Opponent	Rank	Site	TV	Result	Attendance
September 3	6:00 p.m.	vs. South Carolina*		Bank of America Stadium; Charlotte, NC (Belk Kickoff Game, rivalry)	ESPN	L 13–17	51,664
September 12	6:00 p.m.	North Carolina A&T*		Kenan Memorial Stadium; Chapel Hill, NC	ESPN3	W 53–14	44,000
September 19	12:00 p.m.	Illinois*		Kenan Memorial Stadium; Chapel Hill, NC	ESPN2	W 48–14	41,000
September 26	12:30 p.m.	Delaware*		Kenan Memorial Stadium; Chapel Hill, NC	ACCRSN	W 41–14	39,000
October 3	3:30 p.m.	at Georgia Tech		Bobby Dodd Stadium; Atlanta, GA	ESPNU	W 38–31	50,585
October 17	7:00 p.m.	Wake Forest		Kenan Memorial Stadium; Chapel Hill, NC (rivalry)	ACCRSN	W 50–14	50,500
October 24	3:30 p.m.	Virginia		Kenan Memorial Stadium; Chapel Hill, NC (South's Oldest Rivalry)	ACCRSN	W 26–13	52,000
October 29	7:00 p.m.	at No. 23 Pittsburgh		Heinz Field; Pittsburgh, PA	ESPN	W 26–19	43,049
November 7	12:00 p.m.	Duke^{†}		Kenan Memorial Stadium; Chapel Hill, NC (Victory Bell)	ESPN2	W 66–31	60,000
November 14	3:30 p.m.	Miami (FL)	No. 23	Kenan Memorial Stadium; Chapel Hill, NC	ESPNU	W 59–21	61,000
November 21	12:00 p.m.	at Virginia Tech	No. 17	Lane Stadium; Blacksburg, VA	ESPN	W 30–27 ^{OT}	65,632
November 28	3:30 p.m.	at NC State	No. 14	Carter–Finley Stadium; Raleigh, NC (rivalry)	ABC/ESPN2	W 45–34	57,600
December 5	8:00 p.m.	vs. No. 1 Clemson	No. 10	Bank of America Stadium; Charlotte, NC (ACC Championship Game)	ABC	L 37–45	74,514
December 29	5:30 p.m.	vs. No. 17 Baylor*	No. 10	Orlando Citrus Bowl; Orlando, FL (Russell Athletic Bowl)	ESPN	L 38–49	40,418
*Non-conference game; ^{†}Homecoming; Rankings from AP Poll and CFP Rankings after November 3 released prior to game; All times are in Eastern time

North Carolina is the only FBS team that played all of its 2015 regular-season games, both home and away, on grass fields.

== Rankings ==
Ranking movements Legend: ██ Increase in ranking ██ Decrease in ranking — = Not ranked RV = Received votes
	Week															
Poll	Pre	1	2	3	4	5	6	7	8	9	10	11	12	13	14	Final
AP	—	—	—	—	—	—	RV	RV	RV	21	17	12	11	8	10	15
Coaches	RV	—	—	—	—	RV	RV	RV	RV	21	17	12	11	8	11	15
CFP	Not released									—	23	17	14	10	10	Not released

== Game summaries ==
=== Vs. South Carolina ===
	1	2	3	4	Total
Gamecocks	0	10	0	7	17
Tar Heels	7	6	0	0	13

=== North Carolina A&T ===
	1	2	3	4	Total
Aggies	0	0	7	7	14
Tar Heels	22	14	17	0	53

=== Illinois ===
	1	2	3	4	Total
Fighting Illini	0	7	0	7	14
Tar Heels	10	10	7	21	48

=== Delaware ===
	1	2	3	4	Total
Fightin' Blue Hens	7	0	7	0	14
Tar Heels	7	6	14	14	41

=== At Georgia Tech ===
	1	2	3	4	Total
Tar Heels	0	14	10	14	38
Yellow Jackets	7	14	7	3	31

=== Wake Forest ===
	1	2	3	4	Total
Demon Deacons	7	7	0	0	14
Tar Heels	0	29	7	14	50

=== Virginia ===
	1	2	3	4	Total
Cavaliers	10	3	0	0	13
Tar Heels	7	6	3	10	26

=== At Pittsburgh ===
	1	2	3	4	Total
Tar Heels	3	17	3	3	26
#23 Panthers	3	0	10	6	19

=== Duke ===
	1	2	3	4	Total
Blue Devils	3	7	14	7	31
#21 Tar Heels	21	17	21	7	66

=== Miami (FL) ===
	1	2	3	4	Total
Hurricanes	0	0	7	14	21
#17 Tar Heels	7	24	21	7	59

=== At Virginia Tech ===
	1	2	3	4	OT	Total
#12 Tar Heels	7	0	3	14	6	30
Hokies	0	3	7	14	3	27

=== At NC State ===
	1	2	3	4	Total
#11 Tar Heels	35	0	0	10	45
Wolfpack	7	7	9	11	34

=== vs Clemson ===
#1 Clemson Tigers vs #8 North Carolina Tar Heels – Game summary

Quarter	1	2	3	4	Total
#1 Tigers	7	14	14	10	45
#8 Tar Heels	9	7	7	14	37

at Bank of America Stadium • Charlotte, NC

- Date: December 5, 2015
- Game time: 8:00 p.m.
- TV announcers (ABC): Chris Fowler (play-by-play), Kirk Herbstreit (color), Heather Cox (sideline)

=== vs Baylor ===
#17 Baylor Bears vs #10 North Carolina Tar Heels – Game summary

Quarter	1	2	3	4	Total
#10 North Carolina	7	10	14	7	38
#17 Baylor	14	14	14	7	49

at Orlando Citrus Bowl Stadium • Orlando, FL

- Date: December 29, 2015
- Game time: 5:30 p.m.
- Game attendance: 40,418
- TV: ESPN

== Coaching staff ==
North Carolina head coach Larry Fedora entered his fourth year as the North Carolina's head coach for the 2015 season. After ranking as one of the worst defenses in the country in 2014, Fedora completely revamped the Tar Heel defensive coaching staff. Fedora hired Gene Chizik as the new defensive coordinator. Chizik was most recently the head coach at Auburn, where he led the Tigers to a national championship in 2011. With the coaching change, UNC also switched from a 4-2-5 base defense to a 4–3 defense. Other defensive coaching hires include John Papuchis, former defensive coordinator at Nebraska, as linebackers coach, Tray Scott as defensive line coach, and Charlton Warren as defensive backs coach.

Coaches for the 2015 season
Name	Position	Seasons at North Carolina
Larry Fedora	Head coach	4th
Gene Chizik	Defensive coordinator	1st
Gunter Brewer	Co-offensive coordinator/wide receivers	4th (9th overall)
Chris Kapilovic	Co-offensive coordinator/offensive line	2nd (4th overall)
Seth Littrell	Assistant head coach for offense/tight ends	2nd
Keith Heckendorf	Quarterbacks	2nd
John Papuchis	Linebackers coach	1st
Tray Scott	Defensive line coach	1st
Charlton Warren	Defensive backs coach	1st
Lou Hernandez	Strength and conditioning coordinator	4th

== Awards ==
=== All-Conference selections ===
First Team

• Elijah Hood – Running back

• Landon Turner - Guard

Second Team

• Marquise Williams - Quarterback

• Mack Hollins – Wide receiver

• Jon Heck – Offensive tackle

• Caleb Peterson - Guard

• M. J. Stewart - Cornerback

• Ryan Switzer - Specialist

Third Team

• Ryan Switzer – Wide receiver

• Quinshad Davis – Wide receiver

• Lucas Crowley - Center

• Nazair Jones - Defensive tackle

• Shakeel Rashad - Linebacker

• Des Lawrence - Cornerback

=== All-American selections ===
- Landon Turner, Offensive Line (AP, Athlon)
- Ryan Switzer, All-purpose / return specialist (AFCA)

=== NFL draft ===
For the second year in a row, North Carolina did not have any players selected in the NFL draft.

The following players signed as undrafted free agents:

Name	Position	Team
Quinshad Davis	Wide receiver	Detroit Lions
Romar Morris	Running back	New York Jets
Shakeel Rashad	Linebacker	Houston Texans
Jeff Schoettmer	Linebacker	New Orleans Saints
Landon Turner	Guard	New Orleans Saints
Marquise Williams	Quarterback	Minnesota Vikings
