= Johnny White (American football) =

American football player (born 1988)

No. 20, 29, 34
- Position: Running back

Personal information
- Born: February 3, 1988 (age 38); Asheville, North Carolina, U.S.
- Listed height: 5 ft 10 in (1.78 m)
- Listed weight: 202 lb (92 kg)

Career information
- High school: Asheville
- College: North Carolina
- NFL draft: 2011: 5th round, 133rd overall pick

Career history
- Buffalo Bills (2011–2012); Green Bay Packers (2012); Montreal Alouettes (2013)*
- * Offseason or practice squad member only

Career NFL statistics
- Rushing attempts: 20
- Rushing yards: 72
- Rushing average: 3.6
- Stats at Pro Football Reference

Johnny White (born February 3, 1988) is an American former professional football player who was a running back in the National Football League (NFL) with the Buffalo Bills and Green Bay Packers. White played college football for the North Carolina Tar Heels. He was selected by the Bills in the fifth round of the 2011 NFL draft.

== Early life ==
White attended Asheville High School in Asheville, North Carolina. He started just two seasons at tailback and rushed for 5,133 yards to break a 63-year-old school record previously held by legendary Carolina back Charlie "Choo-Choo" Justice. He rushed for 1,855 yards on 207 carries and scored 31 touchdowns as a senior. Also had 10 catches for 150 yards and a touchdown. Rushed for 55 yards despite an injured ankle in Asheville's 13-10 victory over Western Alamance in the 2005 3-A state championship game. He was named the Asheville Citizen-Times All-Western North Carolina Player of the Year.

Considered a three-star recruit by Rivals.com, he was ranked the nation's No. 11 all-purpose back. He committed to North Carolina over other scholarship offers from South Carolina and Arkansas.

== College career ==
After redshirting in 2006, White rushed for 399 yards on 95 carries as a redshirt freshman in 2007. He also caught 15 passes for 159 yards. In 2008, he played cornerback for the first seven games before returning to running back where he played in 2007. He also led the team with 379 kickoff return yards and had a 25.3 average per return. In 2009, he played primarily on offense and special teams. He rushed for 143 yards and a score on 19 carries and caught seven passes for 66 yards and a TD on the season.

As a senior in 2010, Johnny White was converted back to running back for the Tar Heels. White was on pace to surpass the 1,000 yard rushing mark during the 2010 season, but his season was cut short to an injury. He finished his season with 130 carries for 720 yards and seven touchdowns, all team highs. He also had 24 receptions for 288 yards.

== Professional career ==
Pre-draft measurables
Height	Weight	Arm length	Hand span	Wingspan	40-yard dash	10-yard split	20-yard split	20-yard shuttle	Three-cone drill	Vertical jump	Broad jump
5 ft 9 7/8 in (1.77 m)	209 lb (95 kg)	30 in (0.76 m)	9 1/8 in (0.23 m)	5 ft 11 1/8 in (1.81 m)	4.55 s	1.65 s	2.65 s	4.31 s	7.07 s	32.5 in (0.83 m)	9 ft 9 in (2.97 m)
All values from NFL Combine/Pro Day

Considered a mid-round pick by NFL scouts, White was selected by the Buffalo Bills in the fifth round, 133rd Overall in 2011 NFL draft.

On October 15, 2012, White was claimed off waivers by the Green Bay Packers after the Packers' running back depth was decreasing due to the team having to place two players on the injured reserve list in as many weeks. White was placed on Injured Reserve by the Packers on December 5, 2012 to make room for veteran running back Ryan Grant. White was released with an injury settlement on December 27, 2012.

White was signed to the practice roster of the Montreal Alouettes on October 18, 2013. He signed with the Alouettes again in May 2014.
