= Amanda Balionis =

American sports journalist (born 1986)

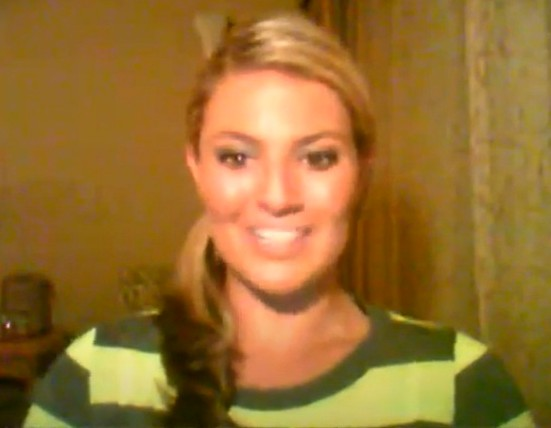
- Balionis in 2013
- Born: Amanda Jacqueline Balionis; June 20, 1986 (age 40); Pittsburgh, Pennsylvania, U.S.
- Other name: Amanda Balionis-Renner
- Education: Manheim Township High School
- Alma mater: Hofstra University (BA)
- Years active: 2009–present
- Employer(s): Verizon Fios Channel 1 (pre 2009); MSG Network (2009–2011); PGA Tour (2011–2017); CBS Sports (2017–present)
- Spouse: Bryn Renner (m. 2022; sep. 2024)

Amanda Jacqueline Balionis (born June 20, 1986) is an American sports journalist. She is a CBS Sports reporter for PGA Tour golf, college football, and NFL football. She also served as a reporter multiple The Match golfing events.

== Early life and education ==
Balionis was born in Pittsburgh, Pennsylvania and later moved to Lancaster, Pennsylvania. She played volleyball for Kutztown University of Pennsylvania for two years before transferring to Hofstra University, where she graduated in August 2008, majoring in broadcast journalism.

== Career ==
She started her career covering high school sports for Verizon Fios Channel 1 and MSG Networks. In 2011, Balionis joined the PGA Tour as an in-house reporter and host, producing and reporting tournament highlights, shows, and events for the website. In 2016 she moved to Callaway Golf to work as an in-house reporter producing digital content for the golf manufacture's media production team. In 2017 CBS hired her as a part-time golf reporter and a year later promoted her to a full-time reporter and added college football and NFL games to her duties.

== Personal life ==
In March 2022, she married former University of North Carolina and Baltimore Ravens quarterback and former FIU quarterbacks coach Bryn Renner. In February 2024, golf fans noticed that Balionis was no longer wearing her wedding ring and by March 2024 Balionis had removed all references to her former married surname on her social media and television platforms.

She runs a non-profit called Puppies and Golf, matching military veterans with dogs.
