= Dyami Brown =

American football player (born 1999)

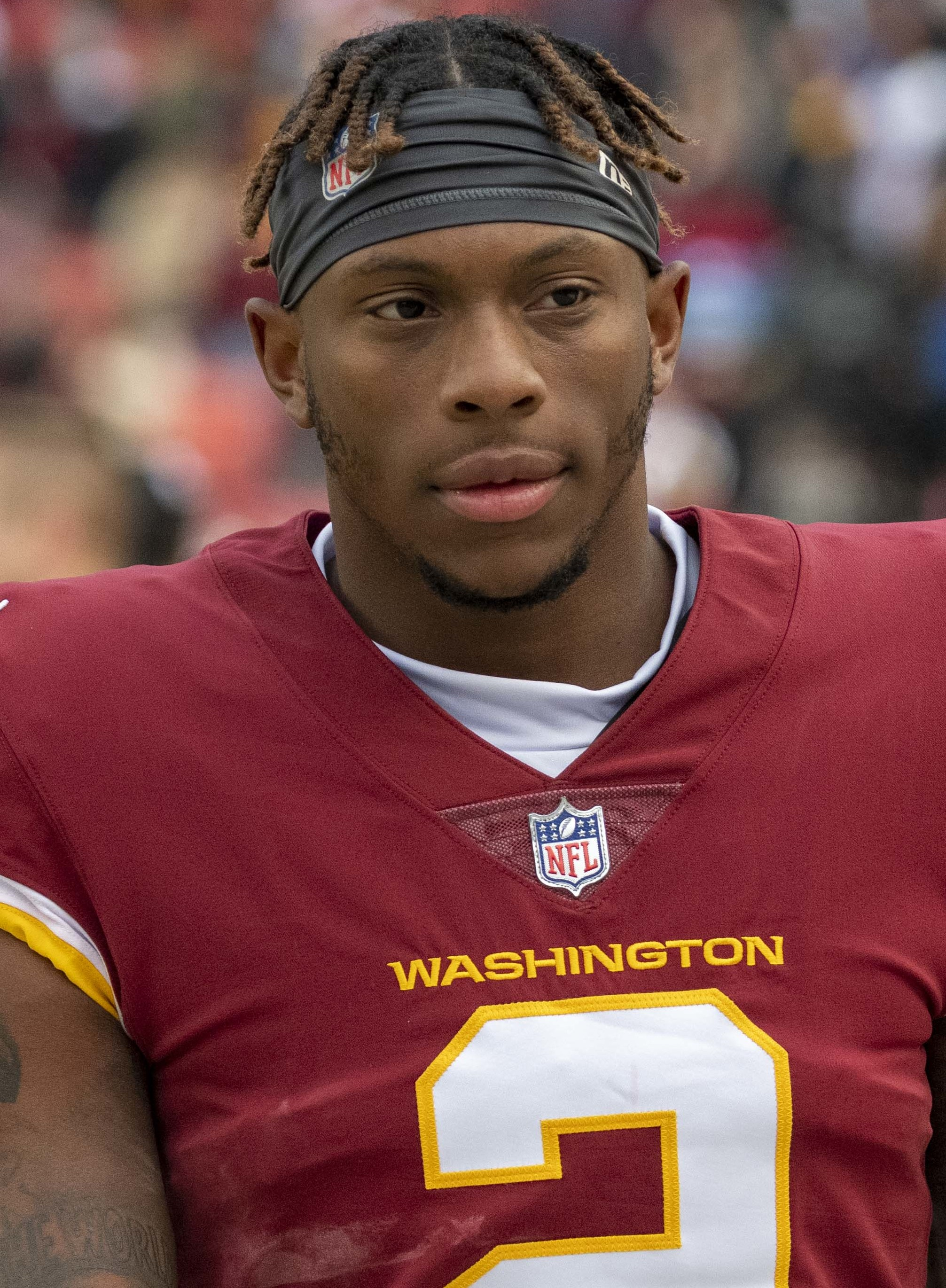
- Brown with the Washington Football Team in 2021

No. 6 – Washington Commanders
- Position: Wide receiver
- Roster status: Injured reserve

Personal information
- Born: November 1, 1999 (age 27); Charlotte, North Carolina, U.S.
- Listed height: 6 ft 0 in (1.83 m)
- Listed weight: 195 lb (88 kg)

Career information
- High school: West Mecklenburg (Charlotte)
- College: North Carolina (2018–2020)
- NFL draft: 2021: 3rd round, 82nd overall pick

Career history
- Washington Football Team / Commanders (2021–2024); Jacksonville Jaguars (2025); Washington Commanders (2026–present)

Awards and highlights
- Third-team All-American (2020); First-team All-ACC (2020); Third-team All-ACC (2019)

Career NFL statistics as of 2025
- Receptions: 79
- Receiving yards: 1,011
- Receiving touchdowns: 5
- Stats at Pro Football Reference

Dyami Brown (/diɒmi/ dee-AH-mee; born November 1, 1999) is an American professional football wide receiver for the Washington Commanders of the National Football League (NFL). Brown played college football for the North Carolina Tar Heels and was selected by the Washington Football Team in the third round of the 2021 NFL draft. He has also played for the Jacksonville Jaguars.

== Early life ==
Brown grew up in Charlotte, North Carolina, and attended West Mecklenburg High School. As a junior, Brown had 999 receiving yards and 14 touchdowns with five interceptions on defense. He caught 41 passes for 631 yards and 10 touchdowns and also rushed for five touchdowns in his senior year. A four-star recruit, Brown was considered the best wide receiver prospect of his class in the state and committed to play college football for the Tar Heels at the University of North Carolina.

== College career ==
As a freshman, Brown caught 17 passes for 173 yards and a touchdown. As a sophomore, he had 51 receptions for 1,034 yards, leading the Atlantic Coast Conference (ACC) with 20.3 yards per reception, and tied the school record with 12 touchdowns. He was named ACC Receiver of the Week after catching six passes for 202 yards and three touchdowns in a loss to the Virginia Cavaliers. He was named receiver of the week again after a six reception, 150-yard performance against NC State.

Brown followed up in 2020 by having another 1,000 yard season with eight touchdowns and was named third-team All-American by the Associated Press in the process. He was also the first FBS player since 2000 to average at least 20 yards per catch in consecutive years. He opted out of participating in the 2021 Orange Bowl in order to prepare for the 2021 NFL draft. His younger brother Khafre played wide receiver alongside him at North Carolina.

=== College statistics ===
| Year | G | Rec | Yards | Avg | TDs |
|---|---|---|---|---|---|
| 2018 | 9 | 17 | 173 | 10.2 | 1 |
| 2019 | 12 | 51 | 1,034 | 20.3 | 12 |
| 2020 | 11 | 55 | 1,099 | 20 | 8 |
| Career | 32 | 123 | 2,306 | 18.7 | 21 |

== Professional career ==
Pre-draft measurables
| Height | Weight | Arm length | Hand span | Wingspan | 40-yard dash | 10-yard split | 20-yard split | 20-yard shuttle | Three-cone drill | Vertical jump | Broad jump | Bench press |
|---|---|---|---|---|---|---|---|---|---|---|---|---|
| 6 ft 0 5/8 in (1.84 m) | 189 lb (86 kg) | 32 3/4 in (0.83 m) | 9 5/8 in (0.24 m) | 6 ft 5 1/4 in (1.96 m) | 4.44 s | 1.57 s | 2.61 s | 4.35 s | 6.85 s | 35.5 in (0.90 m) | 10 ft 8 in (3.25 m) | 18 reps |
All values from Pro Day

=== Washington Football Team / Commanders ===
Brown was selected by the Washington Football Team in the third round (82nd overall) of the 2021 NFL Draft. He signed his four-year rookie contract on May 13, 2021. Brown made his NFL debut in the opening game of the season, recording 1 reception for −2 yards in a loss to the Los Angeles Chargers. He finished his rookie season appearing in 15 games recording 12 receptions for 165 yards and no touchdowns.

In Week 5 of the 2022 season against the Tennessee Titans, Brown caught two passes for 105 yards with both being touchdown receptions, as well as his first career touchdowns. He appeared in 15 games in the 2022 season and had five receptions for 143 yards and two touchdowns. In the 2023 season, he appeared in 17 games and started one. He recorded 12 receptions for 168 yards and one touchdown.

In Week 5 of the 2024 season, Brown recorded his fourth career touchdown and 57 receiving yards off two catches in the 34-13 victory over the Cleveland Browns. He finished the 2024 regular season with new career highs of 30 receptions and 308 receiving yards. In his first playoff appearance, Brown would have a strong performance with five receptions for 89 receiving yards and one touchdown in the Wild Card round win over the Tampa Bay Buccaneers. The following week, he recorded six receptions for 98 yards in a win over the Detroit Lions that advanced Washington to the NFC Championship Game.

=== Jacksonville Jaguars ===
On March 12, 2025, Brown signed a one-year, $10 million contract with the Jacksonville Jaguars.

=== Washington Commanders (second stint) ===
On March 19, 2026, Brown signed a one-year, $3 million contract to return to the Washington Commanders. On November 7, he was placed on injured reserve due to a calf injury.

=== Statistics ===
Regular season statistics
| Season | Team | Games | | Receiving | | | | | | Rushing | | | | | Fumbles | |
| Season | Team | GP | GS | Tgt | Rec | Yds | Avg | Lng | TD | Att | Yds | Avg | Lng | TD | Fum | Lost |
|---|---|---|---|---|---|---|---|---|---|---|---|---|---|---|---|---|
| 2021 | WAS | 15 | 6 | 25 | 12 | 165 | 13.8 | 48 | 0 | 1 | −4 | −4.0 | −4 | 0 | 0 | 0 |
| 2022 | WAS | 15 | 0 | 14 | 5 | 143 | 28.6 | 75 | 2 | 1 | 15 | 15.0 | 15 | 0 | 0 | 0 |
| 2023 | WAS | 17 | 1 | 23 | 12 | 168 | 14.0 | 35 | 1 | 1 | 0 | 0 | 0 | 0 | 0 | 0 |
| 2024 | WAS | 16 | 3 | 40 | 30 | 308 | 10.3 | 51 | 1 | 3 | 26 | 8.7 | 14 | 0 | 1 | 1 |
| 2025 | JAX | 14 | 6 | 37 | 20 | 227 | 11.4 | 39 | 1 | 6 | 30 | 5.0 | 9 | 0 | 1 | 1 |
| Total | | 77 | 16 | 139 | 79 | 1011 | 12.8 | 75 | 5 | 12 | 67 | 5.6 | 15 | 0 | 2 | 2 |

Postseason statistics
| Year | Team | Games | | Receiving | | | | | Rushing | | | | | Fumbles | |
| Year | Team | GP | GS | Rec | Yds | Avg | Lng | TD | Att | Yds | Avg | Lng | TD | Fum | Lost |
|---|---|---|---|---|---|---|---|---|---|---|---|---|---|---|---|
| 2024 | WAS | 2 | 1 | 11 | 187 | 17.0 | 42 | 1 | 0 | 0 | 0 | 0 | 0 | 1 | 1 |
| Career | | 2 | 1 | 11 | 187 | 17.0 | 30 | 1 | 0 | 0 | 0 | 0 | 0 | 1 | 1 |
