= 2018 North Carolina Tar Heels football team =

American college football season

2018 North Carolina Tar Heels football
- Conference: Atlantic Coast Conference
- Coastal Division
- Record: 2–9 (1–7 ACC)
- Head coach: Larry Fedora (7th season)
- Offensive coordinator: Chris Kapilovic (5th season)
- Offensive scheme: Spread
- Defensive coordinator: John Papuchis (2nd season)
- Base defense: 4–3
- Captains: Malik Carney; Michael Carter; Nathan Elliott; Cole Holcomb; Thomas Jackson
- Home stadium: Kenan Memorial Stadium

Uniform
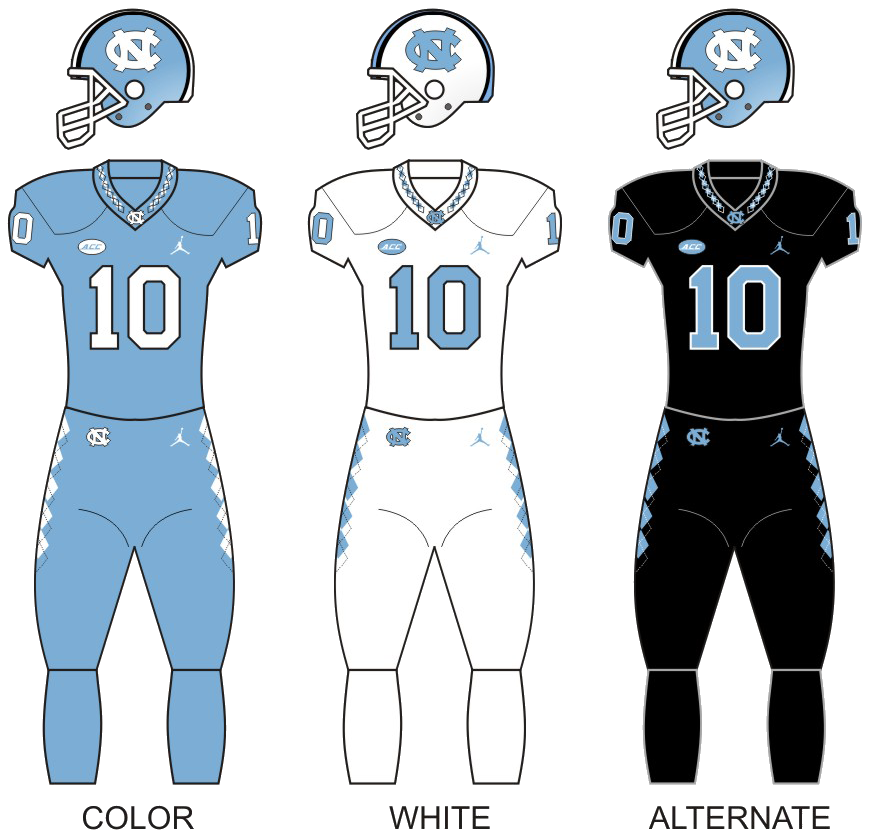

2018 Atlantic Coast Conference football standings
	Conf.			Overall
Team	W		L	W		L
Atlantic Division
No. 1 Clemson x$#^	8	–	0	15	–	0
No. 15 Syracuse	6	–	2	10	–	3
NC State	5	–	3	9	–	4
Boston College	4	–	4	7	–	5
Wake Forest	3	–	5	7	–	6
Florida State	3	–	5	5	–	7
Louisville	0	–	8	2	–	10
Coastal Division
Pittsburgh x	6	–	2	7	–	7
Georgia Tech	5	–	3	7	–	6
Miami (FL)	4	–	4	7	–	6
Virginia	4	–	4	8	–	5
Virginia Tech	4	–	4	6	–	7
Duke	3	–	5	8	–	5
North Carolina	1	–	7	2	–	9
Championship: Clemson 42, Pittsburgh 10
# – College Football Playoff champion; ^ – College Football Playoff participant; $ – Conference champion; x – Division champion/co-champions; Rankings from AP Poll

The 2018 North Carolina Tar Heels football team represented the University of North Carolina at Chapel Hill as a member of Coastal Division of the Atlantic Coast Conference (ACC) during the 2018 NCAA Division I FBS football season. The Tar Heels were led by seventh-year head coach Larry Fedora and played their home games at Kenan Memorial Stadium. They finished the season 2–9 overall and 1–7 in ACC play to place last out of seven teams in the Coastal Division.

On November 25, one day after the conclusion of the season, Fedora was fired. He finished at North Carolina with a seven-year record of 45–43. On November 27, the school rehired Mack Brown, who had previously helmed the program from 1988 to 1997, as head coach.

== Preseason ==
=== Award watch lists ===
Listed in the order that they were released

Award	Player	Position	Year
Doak Walker Award	Michael Carter	RB	SO
John Mackey Award	Carl Tucker	TE	JR
Paul Hornung Award	Anthony Ratliff-Williams	WR/KR	JR
Wuerffel Trophy	Kyle Murphy	LS	SR
Earl Campbell Tyler Rose Award	Nathan Elliott	QB	JR

=== ACC media poll ===
The ACC media poll was released on July 24, 2018.

Media poll (Coastal)
Predicted finish	Team	Votes (1st place)
1	Miami	998 (122)
2	Virginia Tech	838 (16)
3	Georgia Tech	654 (8)
4	Duke	607 (1)
5	Pittsburgh	420
6	North Carolina	370 (1)
7	Virginia	257

== Schedule ==
The Tar Heels' schedule was released on January 17, 2018.

Date	Time	Opponent	Site	TV	Result	Attendance
September 1	4:00 p.m.	at California*	California Memorial Stadium; Berkeley, CA	FOX	L 17–24	42,168
September 8	3:30 p.m.	at East Carolina*	Dowdy–Ficklen Stadium; Greenville, NC	ESPNU	L 19–41	39,268
September 15	12:00 p.m.	No. 18 UCF*	Kenan Memorial Stadium; Chapel Hill, NC	ESPNU	Cancelled (Note: This game was cancelled in anticipation of Hurricane Florence.)	
September 22	12:20 p.m.	Pittsburgh	Kenan Memorial Stadium; Chapel Hill, NC	ACCN	W 38–35	44,168
September 27	8:00 p.m.	at No. 16 Miami (FL)	Hard Rock Stadium; Miami Gardens, FL	ESPN	L 10–47	60,845
October 13	7:00 p.m.	Virginia Tech	Kenan Memorial Stadium; Chapel Hill, NC	ESPNU	L 19–22	50,500
October 20	12:20 p.m.	at Syracuse	Carrier Dome; Syracuse, NY	ACCN	L 37–40 ^{2OT}	35,210
October 27	12:20 p.m.	at Virginia	Scott Stadium; Charlottesville, VA (South's Oldest Rivalry)	ACCN	L 21–31	43,128
November 3	12:00 p.m.	Georgia Tech^{†}	Kenan Memorial Stadium; Chapel Hill, NC	ACCN	L 28–38	40,782
November 10	12:20 p.m.	at Duke	Wallace Wade Stadium; Durham, NC (Victory Bell)	ACCN	L 35–42	35,493
November 17	3:00 p.m.	Western Carolina*	Kenan Memorial Stadium; Chapel Hill, NC	ACCN Extra	W 49–26	41,151
November 24	12:20 p.m.	NC State	Kenan Memorial Stadium; Chapel Hill, NC (rivalry)	ACCN	L 28–34 ^{OT}	41,510
*Non-conference game; ^{†}Homecoming; Rankings from AP Poll released prior to the game; All times are in Eastern time

== Game summaries ==
=== At California ===
	1	2	3	4	Total
Tar Heels	0	0	3	14	17
Golden Bears	7	10	7	0	24

=== At East Carolina ===
	1	2	3	4	Total
Tar Heels	6	13	0	0	19
Pirates	7	14	7	13	41

=== Pittsburgh ===
	1	2	3	4	Total
Panthers	7	21	0	7	35
Tar Heels	7	14	17	0	38

=== At Miami (FL) ===
	1	2	3	4	Total
Tar Heels	10	0	0	0	10
No. 16 Hurricanes	14	19	0	14	47

=== Virginia Tech ===
	1	2	3	4	Total
Hokies	7	0	7	8	22
Tar Heels	6	3	7	3	19

=== At Syracuse ===
	1	2	3	4	OT	2OT	Total
Tar Heels	7	0	17	3	7	3	37
Orange	0	13	7	7	7	6	40

=== At Virginia ===
	1	2	3	4	Total
Tar Heels	7	7	0	7	21
Cavaliers	14	3	7	7	31

=== Georgia Tech ===
	1	2	3	4	Total
Yellow Jackets	7	14	7	10	38
Tar Heels	7	3	10	8	28

=== At Duke ===
	1	2	3	4	Total
Tar Heels	14	14	0	7	35
Blue Devils	14	21	7	0	42

=== Western Carolina ===
	1	2	3	4	Total
Catamounts	7	9	3	7	26
Tar Heels	14	21	14	0	49

=== NC State ===
	1	2	3	4	OT	Total
Wolfpack	7	0	14	7	6	34
Tar Heels	0	6	15	7	0	28

== Coaching staff ==
North Carolina Tar Heels
Name	Position	Consecutive season at North Carolina in current position	Previous position
Larry Fedora	Head coach	7th	Southern Miss head coach (2008–2011)
Deke Adams	Defensive line coach	2nd	East Carolina defensive line coach (2016)
Henry Baker	Cornerbacks coach	1st	Rutgers cornerbacks coach (2017)
Mike Ekeler	Linebackers coach	2nd	North Texas defensive coordinator and linebackers coach (2016)
Robert Gillespie	Running backs coach	1st	Tennessee running backs coach (2013–2017)
Keith Heckendorf	Quarterbacks coach	5th	Arkansas State tight ends coach (2014)
Chris Kapilovic	Associate head coach, offensive coordinator, and offensive line coach	4th	North Carolina co-offensive coordinator and offensive line coach (2014)
John Papuchis	Defensive coordinator	2nd	North Carolina linebackers coach (2015–2016)
Luke Paschall	Special teams coordinator and wide receivers coach	1st	Arkansas State special teams coordinator and outside wide receivers coach (2017)
Chad Scott	Tight ends coach	3rd	Kentucky running backs coach (2014–2015)
Tommy Thigpen	Safeties coach	1st	Tennessee linebackers coach (2016–2017)
Quinshad Davis	Graduate assistant	1st	Winnipeg Blue Bombers wide receiver (player) (2017)
Sam Dunnam	Graduate assistant	1st	Ouachita Baptist defensive line coach (2014–2017)
Jordan Marsh	Graduate assistant	1st	Hickory Ridge HS (NC) assistant coach (2014–2017)
Jeff Schoettmer	Graduate assistant	1st	New Orleans Saints linebacker (player) (2016)

== 2019 NFL draft ==
Round	Pick	Player	Position	NFL club
5	173	Cole Holcomb	LB	Washington Redskins
