= Sam Aiken =

American football player and coach (born 1980)

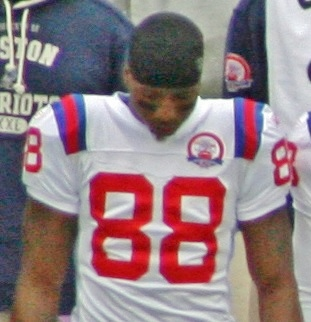
- Aiken with the New England Patriots in 2009

No. 89, 88, 85
- Position: Wide receiver

Personal information
- Born: December 14, 1980 (age 45); Clinton, North Carolina, U.S.
- Listed height: 6 ft 2 in (1.88 m)
- Listed weight: 215 lb (98 kg)

Career information
- High school: James Kenan (Warsaw, North Carolina)
- College: North Carolina
- NFL draft: 2003: 4th round, 127th overall pick

Career history
- Buffalo Bills (2003–2007); New England Patriots (2008–2009); Cleveland Browns (2010)

Awards and highlights
- Second-team All-ACC (2002)

Career NFL statistics
- Receptions: 48
- Receiving yards: 684
- Receiving touchdowns: 2
- Total tackles: 50
- Stats at Pro Football Reference

Samuel Aiken (born December 14, 1980) is an American former professional football player who was a wide receiver in the National Football League (NFL). He was selected by the Buffalo Bills in the fourth round of the 2003 NFL draft. He played college football for the North Carolina Tar Heels.

He also played for the New England Patriots and Cleveland Browns.

== Early life ==
Aiken attended James Kenan High School in Warsaw, North Carolina where he was an All-Conference honoree in football, basketball, and track and field. In track and field, he placed second at the North Carolina State Meet on the high jump.

== College career ==
After graduating from high school, Aiken attended the University of North Carolina at Chapel Hill. He appeared in all 11 games at wide receiver as a freshman in 1999, earning co-Most Outstanding Freshman honors with defensive end Julius Peppers. He recorded three catches for 16 yards, returned 13 kickoffs for a 21.2 average, and 12 punts for a 1.9 yard average. As a sophomore in 2000, Aiken again played in all 11 games and ranked third on the team with 29 receptions for 410 yards and three touchdowns. In 2001, Aiken led his team with 46 catches for 789 yards and eight touchdowns, second best in school history. He also played on all special teams units. As a senior in 2002, Aiken had 68 catches for 990 yards, both school records, as well as four touchdowns.

== Professional career ==
Pre-draft measurables
Height	Weight	Arm length	Hand span	40-yard dash	10-yard split	20-yard split	Three-cone drill	Vertical jump	Broad jump
6 ft 2 in (1.88 m)	209 lb (95 kg)	31 1/4 in (0.79 m)	10 in (0.25 m)	4.65 s	1.62 s	2.71 s	7.22 s	39 1/2 in (1.00 m)	10 ft 1 in (3.07 m)
All values from NFL Combine.

=== Buffalo Bills ===
Aiken was selected by the Buffalo Bills in the fourth round, with the 127th overall pick, of the 2003 NFL draft. He was primarily a special teams player in his five seasons for the Bills, covering kicks and punts for a Bobby April-coached unit that was consistently among the best in the league.

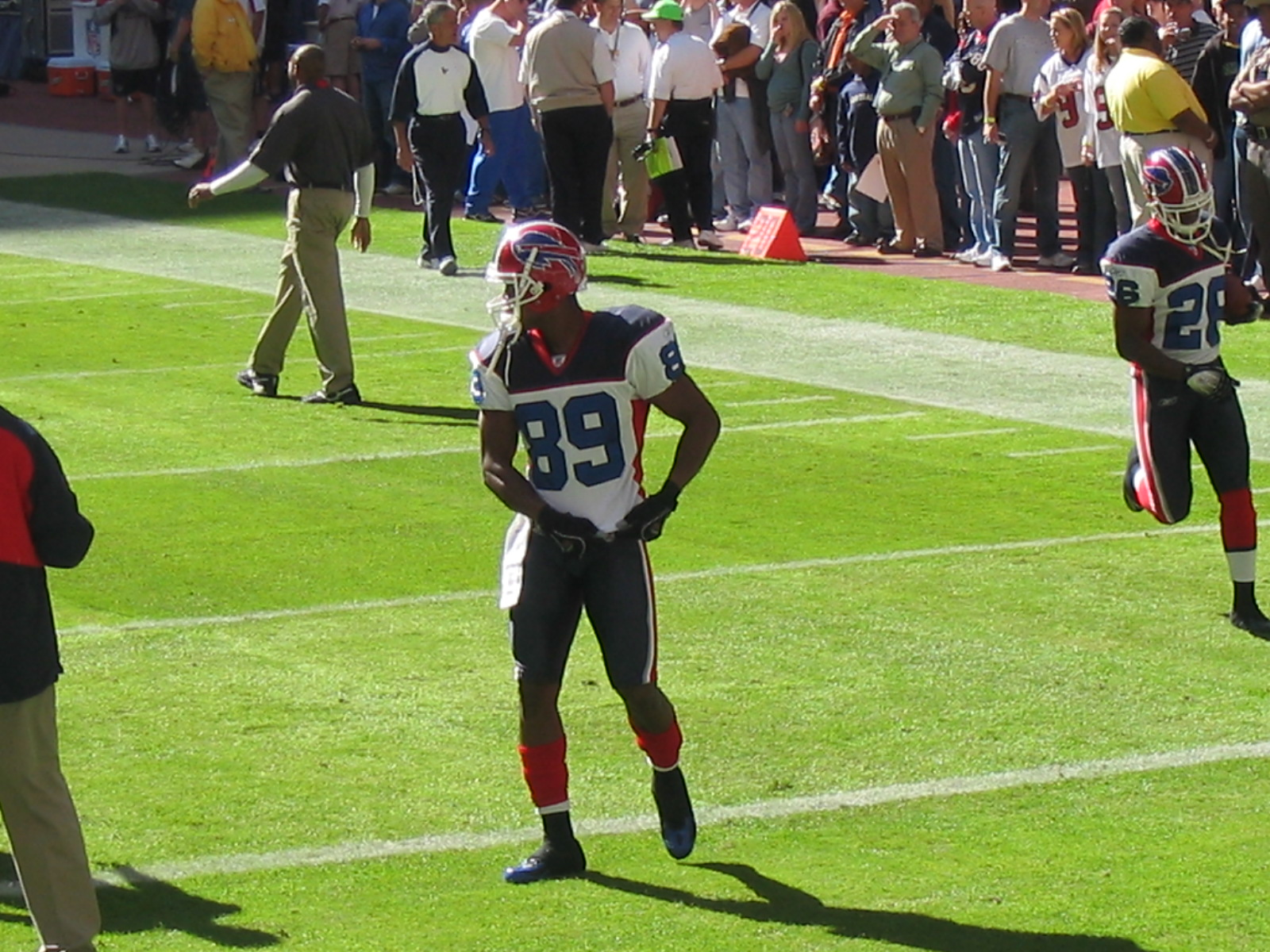
Aiken with the Buffalo Bills in 2006

As a rookie in 2003, Aiken played in five of the team's first 11 games, recording 3 receptions for 35 yards and two special teams tackles before being placed on injured reserve on November 26. In 2004, Aiken played in 16 games, recording a Buffalo career-high 11 catches for 148 yards as well as 14 special teams tackles. He started two games for the Bills in 2005 while playing in all 16 including a matchup in a snow filled game starting for a suspended Eric Moulds; he caught four passes for 57 yards on the season while finishing second on the team with 24 special teams tackles. In 2006, Aiken played in 15 games and picked up 13 special teams tackles. In his final season with the Bills in 2007, Aiken played in 12 games, recording one catch for 10 yards and six special teams tackles.

=== New England Patriots ===
On March 3, 2008, Aiken was signed by the New England Patriots as an unrestricted free agent. Aiken was active for 14 games in his first season with the Patriots, making two starts at wide receiver and recording eight receptions for 101 yards. He finished fifth on the team with 10 special teams tackles. In 2009, Aiken was named a special teams captain following the loss of former special teams ace Larry Izzo in free agency. He also played in an increased role in the offense following the release of offseason acquisitions Joey Galloway and Greg Lewis. He started 7 games for the Patriots, making a career-high 20 receptions for 326 yards. He also caught the first two touchdowns of his career, a 54-yarder in Week 7 and an 81-yarder in Week 13, the third longest career completion for quarterback Tom Brady. He finished the season with 14 games played and 11 special teams tackles. In October 2009, Aiken signed a contract extension through 2011. He was released during final cuts on September 4, 2010.

=== Cleveland Browns ===
Aiken was signed by the Cleveland Browns on September 25, 2010. He was released on October 12, 2010.

== Coaching career ==
In 2012, Aiken returned to his college alma mater, North Carolina, to serve as a graduate assistant (GA) coach for the Tar Heels.
