= Casey Barth =

American football player (born 1990)

No. 14
- Position: Placekicker

Personal information
- Born: February 20, 1990 (age 36); Wilmington, North Carolina, U.S.
- Listed height: 5 ft 11 in (1.80 m)
- Listed weight: 190 lb (86 kg)

Career information
- High school: John T. Hoggard (Wilmington, North Carolina)
- College: North Carolina (2008–2012)
- NFL draft: 2013: undrafted

Career history
- Atlanta Falcons (2013)*; Arizona Rattlers (2014)
- * Offseason or practice squad member only

Career AFL statistics
- Field goals made: 0
- Field goals attempted: 1
- Field goal %: 0%
- Extra points made: 46
- Extra points attempted: 49
- Stats at ArenaFan.com

Casey Barth (born February 20, 1990) is an American former professional football placekicker. He played college football at North Carolina before being signed and released by the Atlanta Falcons in 2013.

== College career ==
Barth attended the University of North Carolina from 2008 to 2012.

In 2008, as a freshman, he converted 10 of 15 field goal attempts (66.7%) and made all 33 extra-point attempts, totaling 63 points. In 2009, during his redshirt freshman season, he improved to 21 of 25 field goals (84%) and 34 of 35 extra points (97.1%), finishing with 97 points.

As a sophomore in 2010, Barth made 19 of 22 field goals (86.4%) and remained perfect on extra points, converting all 38 attempts for a total of 95 points. In 2011, his junior season was limited to three games, during which he made his only field goal attempt and all 11 extra points, totaling 14 points.

In his senior season in 2012, he recorded 15 of 19 field goals (78.9%) and converted all 44 extra-point attempts, finishing with 89 points.

Barth finished his career making 66 of his 82 field goal attempts (80.5%), and went 160 of 161 on extra point attempts (99.4%) which combined for 358 points and also holds the most field goals made in a career (66), and tied with Clint Gwaltney on most made in a season (21).

== Professional career ==
=== Atlanta Falcons ===
Barth went undrafted in the 2013 NFL draft, and was signed by the Atlanta Falcons on April 29, 2013. Ten days later, on May 9, Barth was released.

=== Arizona Rattlers ===
Barth signed with the Arizona Rattlers in 2014. He would play from week 7 to week 11, where he would make 46 of 49 extra points and miss his only field goal attempt.

== Personal life ==
Barth is the younger brother of Connor, who was also a placekicker in the NFL. As of 2025, Barth is a realtor for Intracoastal Realty.
