= Ryan Switzer =

American football player and coach (born 1994)

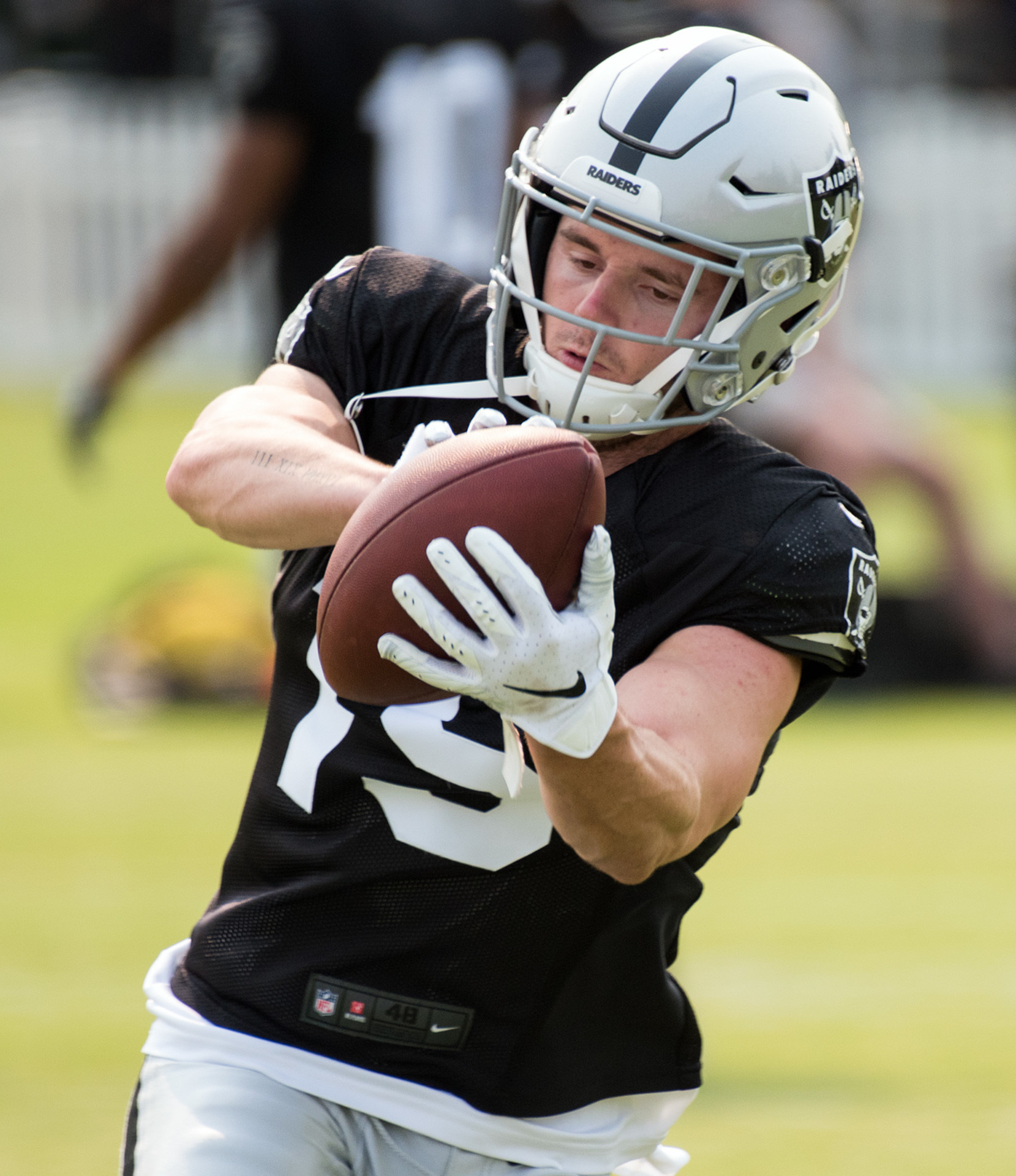
- Switzer with the Oakland Raiders in 2018

Oregon Ducks
- Title: Offensive analyst

Personal information
- Born: November 4, 1994 (age 32); Charleston, West Virginia
- Listed height: 5 ft 8 in (1.73 m)
- Listed weight: 183 lb (83 kg)

Career information
- High school: George Washington (Charleston)
- College: North Carolina
- NFL draft: 2017: 4th round, 133rd overall pick

Career history

Playing
- Dallas Cowboys (2017); Oakland Raiders (2018)*; Pittsburgh Steelers (2018–2019); Cleveland Browns (2020–2021)
- * Offseason or practice squad member only

Coaching
- Tulsa (2023–2024) Wide receivers coach & recruiting coordinator; Tulsa (2024) Interim head coach; Tulsa (2025) Wide receivers coach & passing game coordinator; Oregon (2026–present) Offensive analyst

Awards and highlights
- PFWA All-Rookie Team (2017); NCAA punt return leader (2013); 2× First-team All-American (2013, 2015); 3× First-team All-ACC (2013, 2015, 2016); Third-team All-ACC (2014)

Career NFL statistics
- Receptions: 50
- Receiving yards: 321
- Receiving touchdowns: 1
- Kick return yards: 1,373
- Punt return yards: 537
- Punt return touchdowns: 1
- Stats at Pro Football Reference

Head coaching record
- Career: 0–1 (college)

Ryan Switzer (born November 4, 1994) is an American football coach and former professional football player who is currently an offensive analyst for the Oregon Ducks. Prior to Oregon, he was the wide receivers coach and passing game coordinator for the Tulsa Golden Hurricane. He previously played as a wide receiver and punt returner in the National Football League (NFL) for five seasons. He played college football for the North Carolina Tar Heels, twice earning first-team All-American honors. Switzer was selected by the Dallas Cowboys in the fourth round (133rd overall) of the 2017 NFL draft. He was also a member of the Pittsburgh Steelers, and Cleveland Browns.

== Early life ==
Switzer attended George Washington High School in Charleston, West Virginia, where he played on his high school football team, the Patriots. As a Sophomore, he led the team in receiving and scored 12 total touchdowns (receiving, rushing and return combined), averaging over 110 yards all purpose yards per game for the No. 1 ranked team in the state. He finished his senior season with 206 carries for 2,379 yards and 32 touchdowns; he also caught 20 passes for 253 yards and four touchdowns and returned three interceptions for scores.

In addition to football, Switzer participated in basketball, helping lead George Washington to the 2011 AAA state basketball title as their starting point guard.

Also a standout track and field athlete, Switzer finished 5th as a Freshman in the 2010 AAA state track meet in the 100-meter dash with a time of 11.19 seconds and 6th in the long jump at 21 feet 6 inches (6.55 m) and was the lead man on the 4×100 and 4×200 teams that won state championships. He was timed at 4.33 in the 40-yard dash, completed the 60-yard shuttle in 7.3 seconds and had a vertical leap of 34 inches. He committed to the University of North Carolina at Chapel Hill (UNC) to play college football.

College recruiting
Name	Hometown	School	Height	Weight	40^{‡}	Commit date
Ryan Switzer; WR	Charleston, WV	George Washington HS	5 ft 10 in (1.78 m)	168 lb (76 kg)	4.52	Mar 28, 2012
Ryan Switzer; WR	Recruit ratings: Scout: Rivals: (85)					
Overall recruit ranking: Scout: 47 (WR) Rivals: 22 (WR) ESPN: 59 (WR)
‡ Refers to 40-yard dash; Note: In many cases, Scout, Rivals, 247Sports, On3, and ESPN may conflict in their listings of height, weight and 40 time.; In these cases, the average was taken. ESPN grades are on a 100-point scale.; Sources: "North Carolina Commit List for 2013". Rivals.; "Scout.com Football Recruiting: North Carolina". Scout.; "RecruitTracker 2013: North Carolina". ESPN.; "Scout.com Team Recruiting Rankings". Scout.; "2013 Team Ranking". Rivals.com.

== College career ==
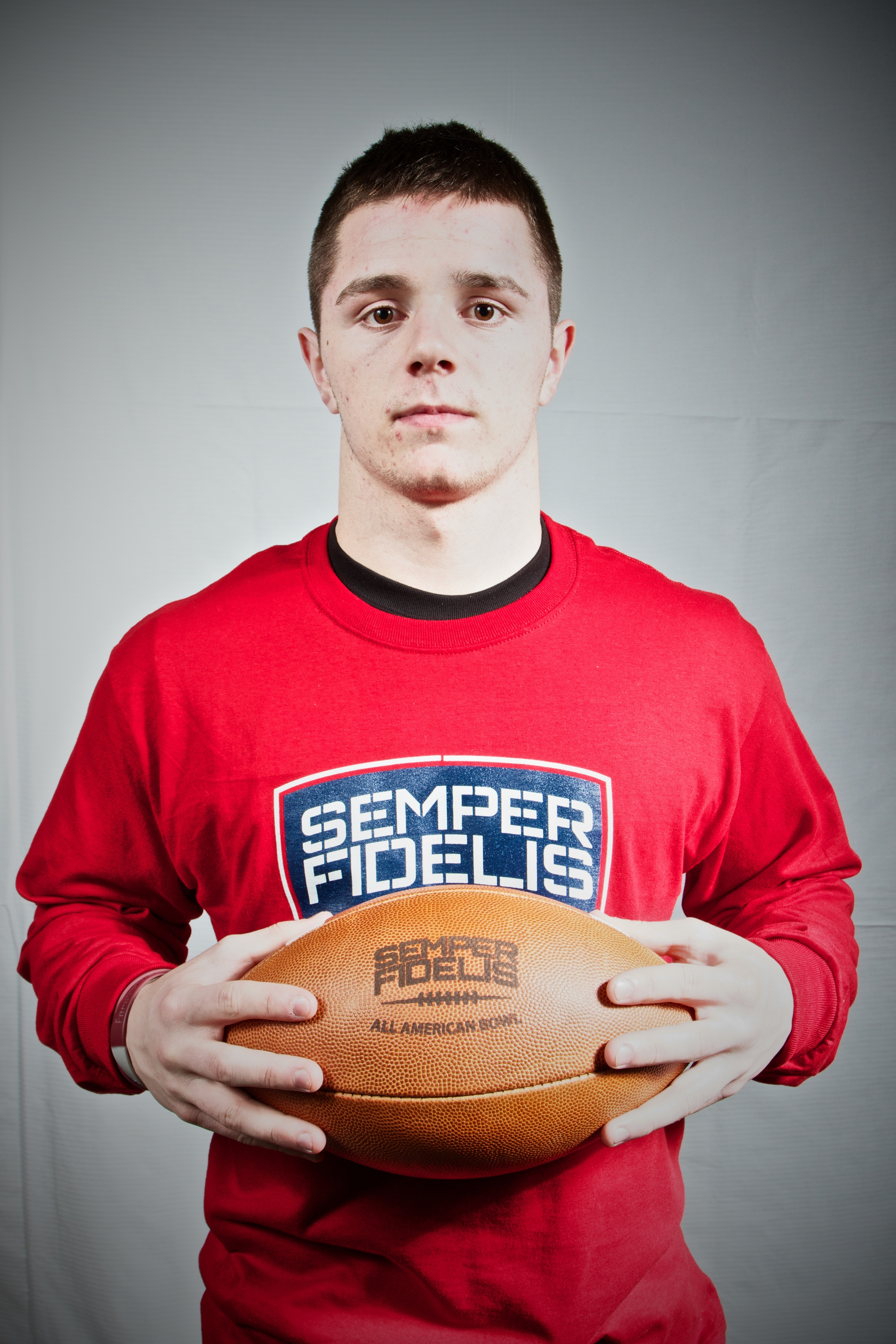
Switzer in 2012

As a freshman at UNC in 2013, Switzer led all NCAA major college players with an average of 20.9 yards per punt return. He accounted for five punt return touchdowns during the season and also had 32 receptions for 341 receiving yards and three receiving touchdowns. On November 2, against NC State, he threw a 59-yard passing touchdown to Quinshad Davis in the 27–19 victory. As a sophomore in 2014, he caught 61 passes for 757 yards and four touchdowns. On September 20, against East Carolina, he threw a 35-yard touchdown pass to T. J. Thorpe in the 70–41 loss.

As a junior in 2015, Switzer recorded a team-high 55 receptions for 697 yards and six touchdowns and also returned two punts for scores. In October 2015, a controversial decision by the Atlantic Coast Conference negated a 70-yard punt return by Switzer, ruling that he had given an "invalid signal" before the return.

In his senior season, Switzer set a school single-season record with 96 receptions for 1,112 yards and scored six touchdowns. He left North Carolina as the career record holder in both receptions and receiving yards.

=== Statistics ===
Legend
	FBS record
	Led NCAA Division I FBS
**Bold**	Career high

Year	Team	Games		Receiving				Rushing				Punt returns				Kick returns			
Year	Team	GP	GS	Rec	Yds	Avg	TD	Att	Yds	Avg	TD	Ret	Yds	Avg	TD	Ret	Yds	Avg	TD
2013	North Carolina	13	0	32	341	10.7	3	**10**	**29**	2.9	0	24	**502**	**20.9**	**5**	—	—	—	—
2014	North Carolina	13	9	61	762	12.5	4	8	**29**	3.6	0	**37**	172	4.6	0	**1**	**17**	**17.0**	0
2015	North Carolina	**14**	10	55	697	**12.7**	**6**	3	6	2.0	0	22	302	13.7	2	**1**	8	8.0	0
2016	North Carolina	13	**11**	**96**	**1,112**	11.6	**6**	3	14	**4.7**	0	16	106	6.6	0	—	—	—	—
Career		53	30	244	2,912	11.9	19	24	78	3.3	0	99	1,082	10.9	7	2	25	12.5	0

== Professional career ==
Pre-draft measurables
Height	Weight	Arm length	Hand span	Wingspan	40-yard dash	10-yard split	20-yard split	20-yard shuttle	Three-cone drill	Vertical jump	Broad jump	Bench press
5 ft 8 1/2 in (1.74 m)	181 lb (82 kg)	28 in (0.71 m)	9 1/4 in (0.23 m)	5 ft 8 in (1.73 m)	4.51 s	1.51 s	2.63 s	4.00 s	6.77 s	32.0 in (0.81 m)	9 ft 8 in (2.95 m)	11 reps
All values from 2017 NFL Combine

=== Dallas Cowboys ===
Switzer was selected by the Dallas Cowboys in the fourth round (133rd overall) in the 2017 NFL draft. He was the fourth of five North Carolina Tar Heels to be selected that year. A hamstring injury forced him to miss multiple training camp practices and the first two preseason games.

On September 10, 2017, Switzer made his NFL debut in the season opener against the New York Giants. In the game, his role was being the kickoff and punt returner. He fielded two kick returns for 42 net yards and one punt return for no yards. On September 25, against the Arizona Cardinals, he recorded a three-yard rush on the first carry of his career.

On October 1, against the Los Angeles Rams, he fumbled a punt that the Rams recovered at the Cowboys' 18-yard line and led to a touchdown score five plays later, contributing to a 30–35 loss. On November 30, 2017, Switzer had an 83-yard punt return against the Washington Redskins to score his first career touchdown, and the first Cowboys' punt return touchdown in four years. Outside of the season finale against the Philadelphia Eagles, he was not given much of a chance at wide receiver, finishing with 4 receptions for 32 yards.

He led the team in both punt and kickoff returns. He averaged 8.8 yards per punt return and was ninth-best in the NFL among 20 returners with at least 25 attempts. He averaged 25 yards per kickoff attempt and was third-best in the league among the 10 kick returners with at least 24 attempts. He was named to the PFWA All-Rookie Team.

=== Oakland Raiders ===
On April 28, 2018, after the Cowboys acquired Tavon Austin and drafted two wide receivers, Switzer was traded to the Oakland Raiders in exchange for defensive tackle Jihad Ward. He was acquired to be the Oakland Raiders' return specialist, reuniting with Rich Bisaccia who was his special teams coach with the Cowboys.

=== Pittsburgh Steelers ===
On August 27, 2018, Switzer was traded to the Pittsburgh Steelers along with a 2019 sixth-round draft pick (#175-Sutton Smith), in exchange for a 2019 fifth-round draft choice (#158-Michael Jackson). During the Steelers' Week 3 win over the Tampa Bay Buccaneers, Switzer recorded his first receiving touchdown as a Steeler on a one-yard reception from Ben Roethlisberger. On November 25, 2018, against the Denver Broncos, Switzer had six receptions for a season-high 67 yards during the loss. He finished the season with 36 receptions for 253 yards, one receiving touchdown, 30 punt returns for 252 yards and 30 kickoff returns for 607 yards.

On November 14, 2019, Switzer was placed on injured reserve with a back injury. On December 26, he was designated for return from injured reserve, and began practicing with the team again, but was not activated as the Steelers failed to make the playoffs. He appeared in 9 games and played only 81 offensive snaps. He registered 8 receptions for 27 yards, 8 punt returns for 29 yards and 9 kickoff returns for 166 yards.

In 2020, he was passed on the depth chart by Ray-Ray McCloud during training camp, and was waived on September 5, 2020.

=== Cleveland Browns ===
Switzer was signed to the practice squad of the Cleveland Browns on October 1, 2020. He was placed on the practice squad/injured list on November 10, 2020, and restored to the practice squad on December 8, 2020. He was placed on the practice squad/COVID-19 list by the team on December 24, 2020, and restored to the practice squad on December 30.

On January 23, 2021, Switzer signed a reserve/futures contract with the Browns. The Browns placed Switzer on injured reserve on August 16, 2021.

On July 18, 2022, Switzer announced his retirement from the NFL.

== Coaching career ==
=== Tulsa ===
Tulsa hired Switzer as its wide receivers coach in 2023, under new head coach Kevin Wilson. Tulsa fired Wilson with one game remaining in the 2024 season and Switzer took over as interim head coach.

=== Oregon ===
In 2026, Switzer was hired has an offensive analyst for Oregon.

== Head coaching record ==
Year	Team	Overall	Conference	Standing	Bowl/playoffs
Tulsa Golden Hurricane (American Athletic Conference) (2024)
2024	Tulsa	0–1	0–1	T–13th (Note: Succeeded Kevin Wilson with one game remaining)	
Tulsa:		0–1	0–1		
Total:		0–1			

== See also ==
- List of NCAA major college football yearly punt and kickoff return leaders
