= Connor Barth =

American football player (born 1986)

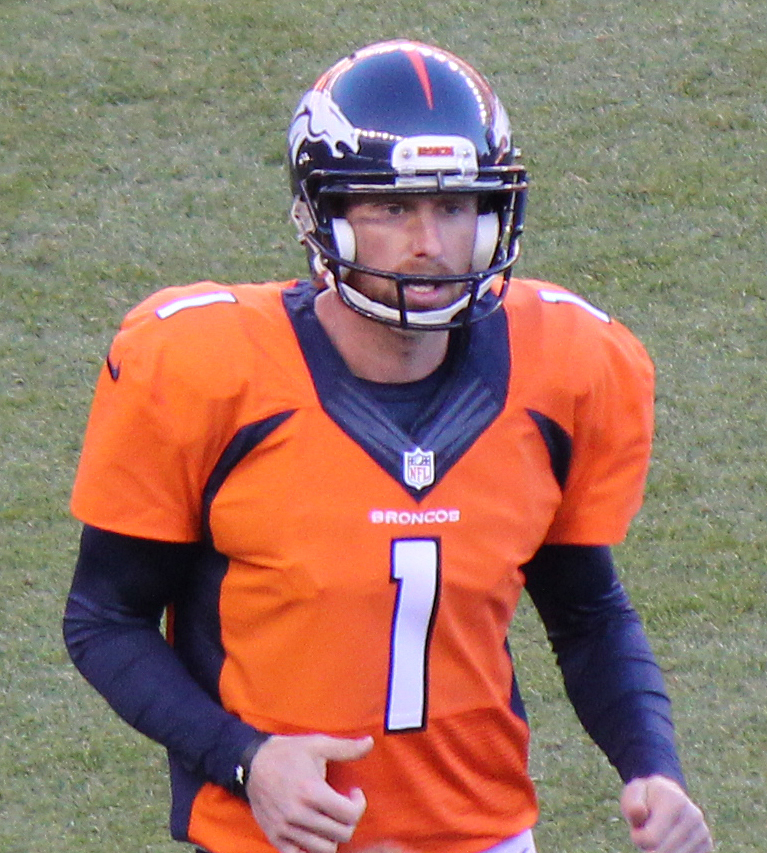
- Barth with the Denver Broncos in 2014

No. 5, 10, 1, 4
- Position: Placekicker

Personal information
- Born: April 11, 1986 (age 40); Wilmington, North Carolina, U.S.
- Listed height: 5 ft 11 in (1.80 m)
- Listed weight: 193 lb (88 kg)

Career information
- High school: John T. Hoggard (Wilmington)
- College: North Carolina (2004–2007)
- NFL draft: 2008: undrafted

Career history
- Kansas City Chiefs (2008); Miami Dolphins (2009)*; Tampa Bay Buccaneers (2009–2013); Denver Broncos (2014); Tampa Bay Buccaneers (2015); New Orleans Saints (2016)*; Chicago Bears (2016–2017)
- * Offseason or practice squad member only

Awards and highlights
- First-team All-ACC (2007)

Career NFL statistics
- Field goals made: 168
- Field goals attempted: 203
- Field goal %: 82.8
- Longest field goal: 57
- Stats at Pro Football Reference

Connor Thomas Barth (born April 11, 1986) is an American former professional football player who was a placekicker for 10 seasons in the National Football League (NFL). He played college football for the North Carolina Tar Heels and was signed by the Kansas City Chiefs as an undrafted free agent in 2008.

Barth was also a member of the Miami Dolphins, Denver Broncos, Tampa Bay Buccaneers, New Orleans Saints, and Chicago Bears.

== Early life ==
Barth learned to kick under the tutelage of Brian Cardone in Wilmington, North Carolina. Barth was named to the first-team high school All-America by USA Today during his prep career at John T. Hoggard High School in Wilmington. He played in the U.S. Army All-American Bowl, where he was named the top kicker in the combine. He was selected to the inaugural EA Sports High School All-America Team. Out of high school, Barth was considered one of the best kickers in the country by most recruiting services. He set the North Carolina state record for field goals in a season and career with 38. The Charlotte Observer ranked him among the top 25 overall players in the state of North Carolina. In 2002, he had a string of 40 consecutive extra points. Playing as a punter and a kicker, Barth made 11 of 14 field goals that year. He also was 53 of 54 on extra point attempts as a Junior. He kicked 75 percent of his kickoffs into the end zone. As a punter, he punted 42 times for a 38.2-yard average.

== College career ==
In 2004, as a freshman at the University of North Carolina at Chapel Hill, Barth was named second-team freshman All-America by the Rivals.com recruiting network. He was also an honorable-mention All-ACC member. In 2004, he made 14 of 18 field goals and 35 of 37 extra point attempts. He is well known for a 42-yard game-winning field goal as time expired against #3 Miami. He made his first career field goal on a 22-yard attempt at Virginia.

In 2005, as a sophomore, Barth made 11 of 21 field goals. He struggled throughout the season, but connected on eight of his last ten field goal attempts.

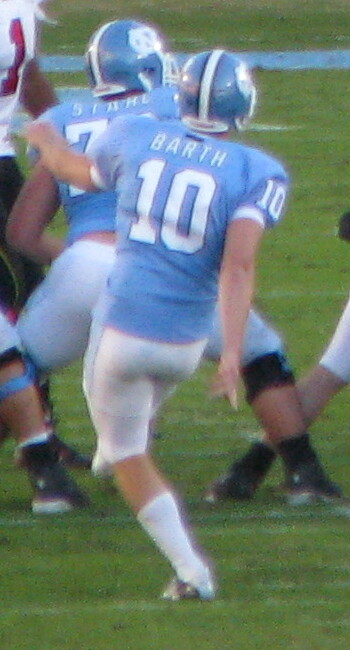
Barth with the North Carolina Tarheels in 2007

In 2006, as a junior, Barth made all 10 field goal attempts and 24 of 26 extra points. He was the only kicker in the country with a perfect field goal percentage. In a game against North Carolina State, Barth made a 54-yarder that was his career best and tied for the second-longest in school history.

In 2007, as a senior, Barth made 19 of 22 field goals and 30 of his final 33 attempts, dating back to his sophomore season. He earned first-team All-ACC honors from Rivals.com and honorable mention all-conference honors from the Associated Press. Against Miami, Barth kicked a career-high four field goals in the 33–27 win and was named the ACC special teams player of the week. He graduated UNC with a Communications major.

Barth previously held the UNC record for most made field goals (54). His brother, Casey, now holds the current record (66)

=== Statistics ===
Season	Overall FGs								PATs	
Season	FGM	FGA	FG%	0–29	30–39	40–49	+50	Lng	XPM	XPA
2004	14	18	77.8	6–6	5–7	2–3	1–2	50	35	37
2005	11	21	52.4	6–7	1–4	4–8	0–2	45	23	23
2006	10	10	100.0	4–4	2–2	2–2	2–2	54	24	26
2007	19	22	86.4	5–5	6–6	7–8	1–3	51	21	23
Total	54	71	76.1	21–22	15–20	15–21	4–9	54	103	109

== Professional career ==
=== Kansas City Chiefs ===
Barth was signed as an undrafted free agent by the Kansas City Chiefs in 2008.

Barth failed to beat out Nick Novak for the team's placekicking job and was waived by the Chiefs on August 29, 2008.

Barth was re-signed by the team on October 21 after Novak was released. In his first NFL game, Barth went 1-for-1 on field goal attempts and 3-for-3 on extra points against the New York Jets. He remained perfect up until a Week 15 game (going in he was 9-for-9) where he missed two field goal attempts, including what would have been a game winning 50-yard field goal as time expired against the San Diego Chargers.

Barth was waived by the Chiefs on July 28, 2009, in favor of Ryan Succop.

=== Miami Dolphins ===
Barth was signed by the Miami Dolphins on August 10, 2009, to compete with incumbent Dan Carpenter. However, the Dolphins waived Barth on August 29.

=== Tampa Bay Buccaneers (first stint) ===
==== 2009 season ====
Barth was signed by the Buccaneers on November 3, 2009, after the Buccaneers released Shane Andrus. Barth tied an NFL record held by three other kickers when he made three field goals of 50 yards or more against the Miami Dolphins on November 15, 2009; the kicks were from 51, 50, and 54 yards.

On December 27, 2009, Barth kicked a 47-yard overtime field goal to give the Buccaneers the win over the New Orleans Saints, 20–17. He appeared in nine games in the 2009 season. He converted all 12 extra point attempts and 14 of 19 field goal attempts.

==== 2010 season ====
In Week 5 of the 2010 season, Barth kicked a 31-yard field goal with :01 left in the game to give the Buccaneers a 24–21 lead over the Cincinnati Bengals. In Week 7,, Barth had a season-long 53-yard field goal against the St. Louis Rams, while going 4-of-4 on field goal attempts, setting a new career-high for field goals made and tying his career high for attempts. Overall, in the 2010 season, Barth converted all 36 extra point attempts and 23 of 28 field goal attempts.

==== 2011 season ====
In Week 6 of the 2011 season, Barth recorded career-high 14 points (four field goals and two extra points) in the 26–20 win against the New Orleans Saints. In Week 13, Barth went 4-for-4 on field goal attempts, converting from 50, 47, 46, and 44 yards, in the first half against the Carolina Panthers. He became just the third NFL player in history to record four-plus field goals of 40 or more yards in one half. In the 2011 season, Barth converted all 23 extra point attempts and 26 of 28 field goal attempts. Barth the set franchise record with a 92.9 field goal percentage (26–28) in 2011, shattering Steve Christie's 85.2 percent (23–27) in 1990.

==== 2012 season ====
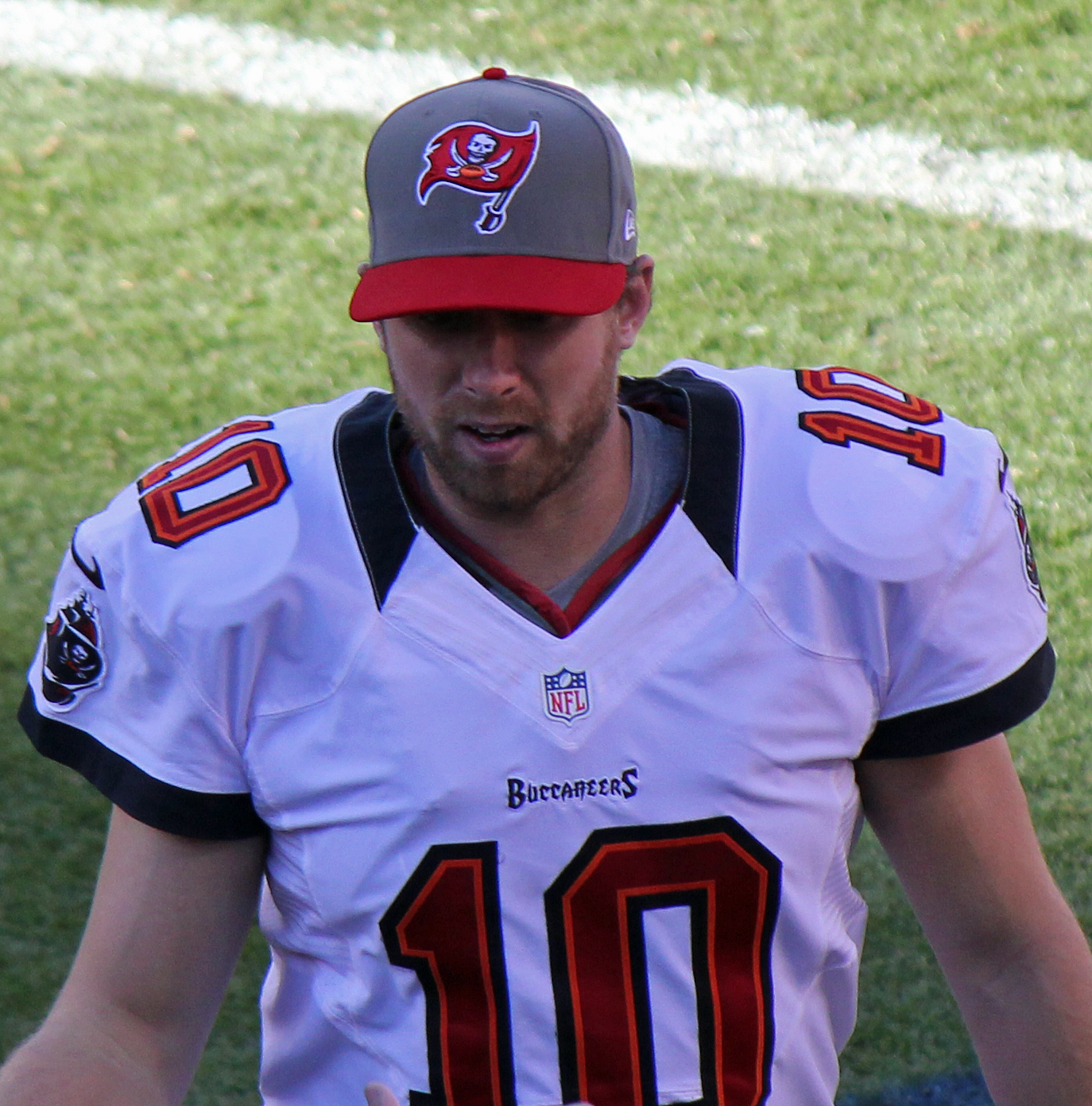
Barth with the Tampa Bay Buccaneers in 2012

In Week 7 of the 2012 season, Barth kicked three field goals and three extra points for a season-high 12 points in the 36–17 win against the Minnesota Vikings. In Week 9, Barth kicked a career-high six extra points in the 42–32 win against the Oakland Raiders. Overall, in the 2012 season, Barth converted all 39 extra point attempts and 28 of 33 field goal attempts. Barth finished 11th in the league with a career-high 123 points. Barth set a single-season franchise record with six field goals of 50 or more yards.

==== 2013 season ====
On July 17, 2013, Barth was placed on injured reserve and missed the 2013 season with an Achilles injury suffered while taking part in a charity basketball game. Barth was replaced by veteran placekicker Rian Lindell.

During the 2013 offseason, the Buccaneers signed rookie Patrick Murray to compete with Barth.

On August 29, 2014, Barth was released by the Buccaneers, losing to Murray.

=== Denver Broncos ===
On November 25, 2014, Barth signed with the Denver Broncos after they released their previous kicker, Brandon McManus. Barth won AFC Special Teams Player of the Month for December. During his five games in 2014, Barth tied the Broncos record of five field goals in a game twice. On August 26, 2015, Barth was released.

=== Tampa Bay Buccaneers (second stint) ===
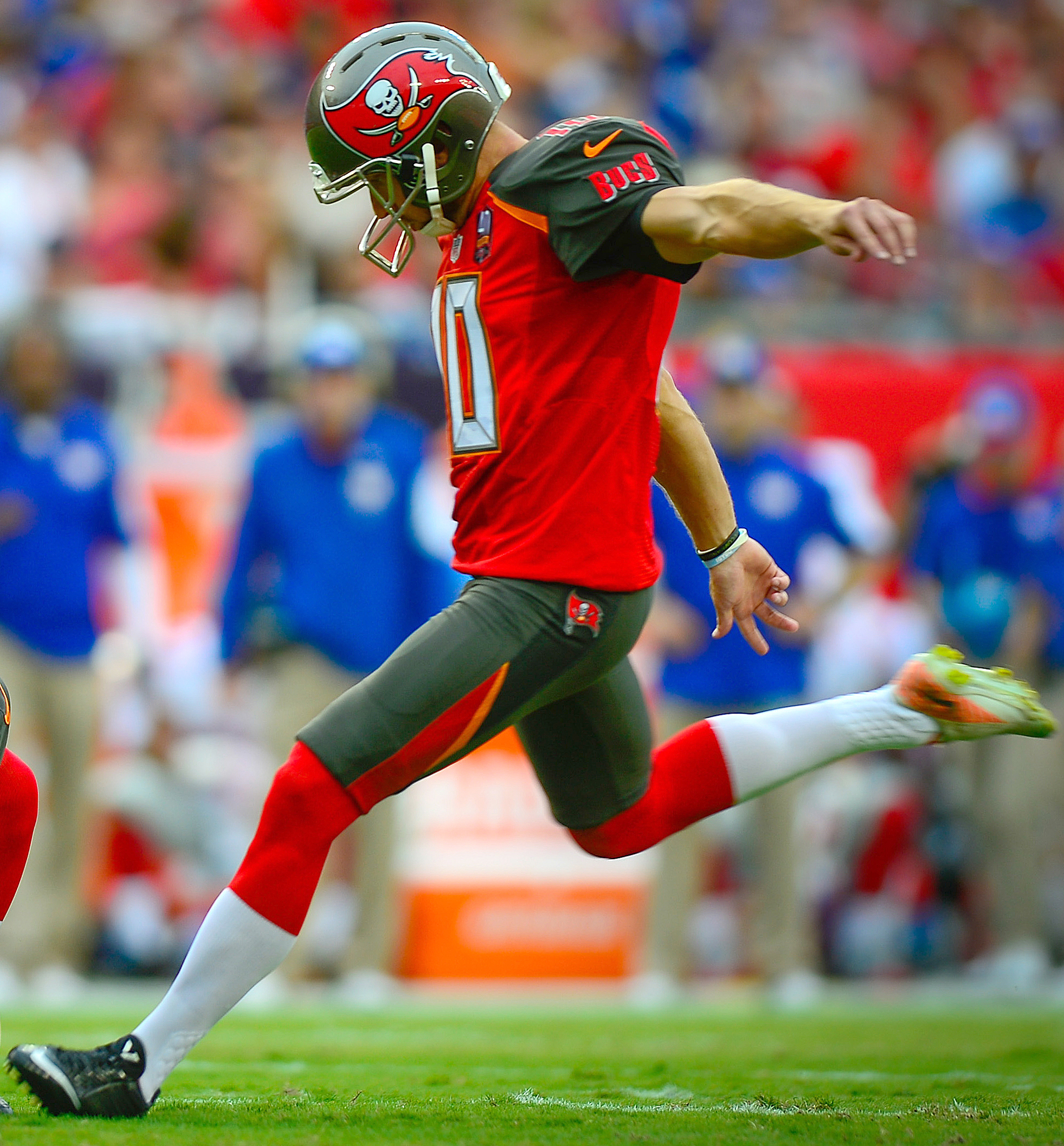
Barth with the Tampa Bay Buccaneers in 2015

Barth signed a two-year contract with the Tampa Bay Buccaneers on August 26, 2015. On September 4, he was released by the Buccaneers. Barth was re-signed by Tampa Bay on October 6, after the team released starting kicker Kyle Brindza. On November 8, Barth kicked a season-high four field goals against the New York Giants. In the 2015 season, Barth converted 25-of-26 extra point attempts and 23-of-28 field goal attempts.

On May 2, 2016, Barth was released after the Buccaneers drafted Roberto Aguayo in the second round of the 2016 NFL draft.

=== New Orleans Saints ===
On May 19, 2016, it was reported that Barth was on his way to New Orleans to sign with the New Orleans Saints, where he would compete with the Saints' current kicker Kai Forbath. On September 3, he was released by the Saints after Forbath won the competition.

=== Chicago Bears ===
==== 2016 season ====
On September 5, 2016, Barth was signed by the Chicago Bears to replace Robbie Gould. On September 18, in Week 2, Barth missed his first field goal attempt with the Bears against the Philadelphia Eagles. He finished the 2016 season converting 31 of 32 extra point attempts and 18 of 23 field goal attempts.

==== 2017 season ====
On March 10, 2017, the Bears re-signed Barth to a one-year contract extension. On November 19, during Week 11 against the Detroit Lions, with only eight seconds left in the fourth quarter, Barth missed a 46-yard field goal attempt as the ball went sailing far right. The Bears lost 27–24. The Bears released Barth and signed Cairo Santos as his replacement the next day. It would be the final NFL game of Barth's career. Barth finished his final NFL season converting all 17 extra point attempts and of 11 of 16 field goal attempts in ten games.

== NFL career statistics ==
Legend
**Bold**	Career high

Year	Team	GP	Overall FGs					PATs				Kickoffs					Points
Year	Team	GP	Blk	Lng	FGM	FGA	Pct	XPM	XPA	Pct	Blk	KO	Avg	TB	Ret	Avg	Points
2008	KC	10	0	45	10	12	83.3	24	24	**100.0**	0	—	—	—	—	—	54
2009	TB	9	0	54	14	19	73.7	12	12	**100.0**	0	36	64.1	6	29	18.8	54
2010	TB	16	0	53	23	28	82.1	36	36	**100.0**	0	**78**	61.7	1	**75**	20.7	105
2011	TB	16	0	55	26	28	92.9	23	23	**100.0**	0	—	—	—	—	—	101
2012	TB	15	0	**57**	**28**	**33**	84.8	**39**	**39**	**100.0**	0	—	—	—	—	—	**123**
2013	TB	0	Did not play due to injury														
2014	DEN	5	0	50	15	16	**93.8**	15	15	**100.0**	0	8	57.0	0	8	24.9	60
2015	TB	12	0	53	23	28	82.1	25	26	96.2	0	64	63.5	**32**	30	**25.6**	94
2016	CHI	16	**1**	54	18	23	78.3	31	32	96.8	0	64	62.1	26	35	21.9	85
2017	CHI	10	**1**	54	11	16	68.8	17	17	**100.0**	0	37	**64.2**	17	20	24.4	50
Total		109	2	57	168	203	82.8	222	224	99.1	0	287	62.7	82	197	21.9	726

== Personal life ==
Barth is the son of Thomas and Susan Barth. His younger brother, Casey, was also a placekicker for North Carolina.

Barth is a longtime friend and former teammate of Chicago Bears head coach Ben Johnson, they were roommates at UNC.

Barth is currently a real estate agent for Intracoastal Realty in Wilmington, North Carolina.
