= T. J. Yates =

American football player and coach (born 1987)

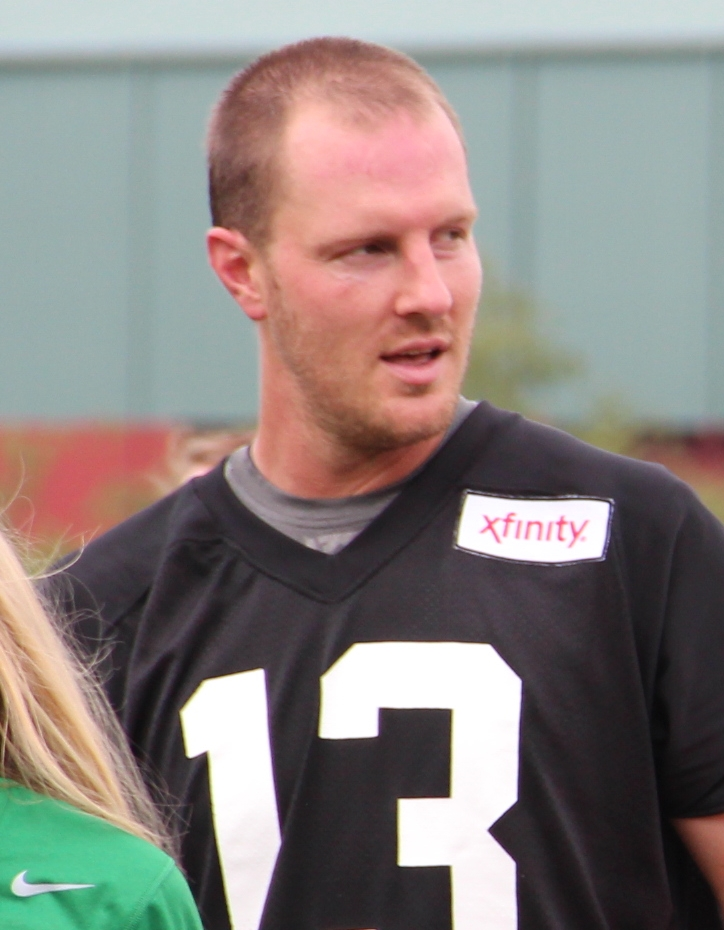
- Yates with the Atlanta Falcons in 2015

Tampa Bay Buccaneers
- Title: Passing game coordinator

Personal information
- Born: May 28, 1987 (age 39); Indianapolis, Indiana, U.S.
- Listed height: 6 ft 4 in (1.93 m)
- Listed weight: 217 lb (98 kg)

Career information
- Position: Quarterback (No. 13, 6, 9, 2)
- High school: Pope (Marietta, Georgia)
- College: North Carolina (2006–2010)
- NFL draft: 2011: 5th round, 152nd overall pick

Career history

Playing
- Houston Texans (2011–2013); Atlanta Falcons (2014); Houston Texans (2015); Miami Dolphins (2016); Buffalo Bills (2017); Houston Texans (2017)

Coaching
- Houston Texans (2019–2020); Offensive assistant (2019); Assistant quarterbacks coach (2020); Atlanta Falcons (2021–2025); Passing game specialist (2021); Wide receivers coach (2022–2023); Quarterbacks coach (2024); Passing game coordinator & wide receivers coach (2025); Tampa Bay Buccaneers (2026–present) Passing game coordinator

Career NFL statistics
- Passing attempts: 324
- Passing completions: 179
- Completion percentage: 55.2%
- TD–INT: 10–11
- Passing yards: 2,057
- Passer rating: 70.7
- Stats at Pro Football Reference

Taylor Jonathan Yates (born May 28, 1987) is an American professional football coach and former player who currently serves as the passing game coordinator for the Tampa Bay Buccaneers of the National Football League (NFL). He played professionally as a quarterback for seven seasons in the NFL. After playing college football for the North Carolina Tar Heels, Yates was selected by the Houston Texans in the fifth round of the 2011 NFL draft. He was also a member of the Atlanta Falcons, Miami Dolphins, and Buffalo Bills. Since retiring from play, Yates has served as an assistant coach for both the Texans and Falcons.

== Early life ==
Yates attended Pope High School, in the north Atlanta suburb of Marietta. He played football for his freshman year and into the 2003 season until moving his focus to basketball. Yates returned to football in 2005, where he played quarterback and punter, earning Atlanta Metro First-Team All-Area honors.

== College career ==
Yates played quarterback for the North Carolina Tar Heels at the University of North Carolina at Chapel Hill from 2006 to 2010. In the 2006 season, he redshirted. In the 2007 season, he finished with 2,655 passing yards, 14 touchdowns, and 18 interceptions. In the 2008 season, he suffered an ankle injury and had to miss some time. Overall, he finished with 1,168 passing yards, 11 touchdowns, and four interceptions. In the 2009 season, he finished with 2,136 passing yards, 14 touchdowns, and 15 interceptions. In the 2010 season, he finished with 3,418 passing yards, 19 touchdowns, and nine interceptions. Yates held school records for total career passing yards and single-season passing yards, breaking previous records set by Darian Durant, until he was passed by Tar Heel quarterbacks Sam Howell (total passing yards) and Mitch Trubisky (single-season). During his time in Chapel Hill, Yates was a member of the Alpha Tau chapter of the Sigma Chi fraternity.

== Professional career ==
Pre-draft measurables
Height	Weight	Arm length	Hand span	Wingspan	40-yard dash	10-yard split	20-yard split	20-yard shuttle	Three-cone drill	Vertical jump	Broad jump
6 ft 3 3/8 in (1.91 m)	219 lb (99 kg)	32 1/2 in (0.83 m)	10 1/4 in (0.26 m)	6 ft 3 1/8 in (1.91 m)	5.07 s	1.76 s	2.98 s	4.12 s	6.96 s	29.5 in (0.75 m)	8 ft 8 in (2.64 m)
All values from NFL Combine

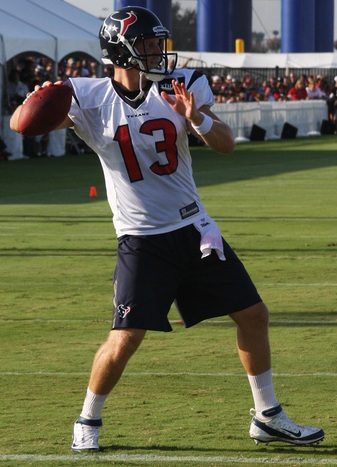
Yates with the Houston Texans in 2011

=== Houston Texans ===
Yates was selected with the 152nd pick (fifth round) of the 2011 NFL draft by the Houston Texans. He first saw action in a November 27, 2011, game against the Jacksonville Jaguars when quarterback Matt Leinart left the game with a collarbone injury, throwing 8-of-15 for 70 yards and a fumble. Yates made his first career start in the next game against the Atlanta Falcons, throwing 12-of-25 for 188 yards and a touchdown. Yates also became the first former University of North Carolina player to start an NFL game at quarterback. Yates started his second game on December 11 against the Cincinnati Bengals. Yates completed 26-of-44 passes for 300 yards. He threw two touchdowns and one interception and helped lead the Texans to their tenth win, clinching a playoff spot for the first time in franchise history. For his performance in the Bengals game he was named the Pepsi NFL Rookie of the Week. On January 7, 2012, in the Wild Card Round, Yates led the Texans to their first ever playoff win with the score of 31–10 over the Cincinnati Bengals (the same team Yates and the Texans beat to clinch their first ever playoff berth), becoming the fifth rookie quarterback to win a playoff game after finishing the game with 11 completed passes out of 20 attempted passes for a passer rating of 97.7 along with a 40-yard touchdown to Andre Johnson and 159 passing yards. The game was the first playoff game in NFL history that had two rookie quarterbacks starting for their respective teams (Andy Dalton was the other rookie). The Texans eventually lost to the Baltimore Ravens in the Divisional Round by a score of 20–13 after Yates completed 17 of 35 passes for 185 yards but also three interceptions and no touchdowns for a quarterback rating of 28.8.

Yates began the 2012 season second on the depth chart, behind quarterback Matt Schaub, but ahead of John Beck and undrafted rookie Case Keenum. He did not see much playing time in the 2012 season, finishing 4-of-10 for 38 yards and an interception while having one rushing touchdown, which occurred against the New England Patriots in a 42–14 loss. Yates replaced Schaub against the St. Louis Rams during the 2013 season, throwing two interceptions, one of which was returned for a touchdown. Yates ended 2013 completing 15 of 22 passes for 113 yards and two interceptions, while also being third on the depth chart behind Schaub and Keenum.

=== Atlanta Falcons ===
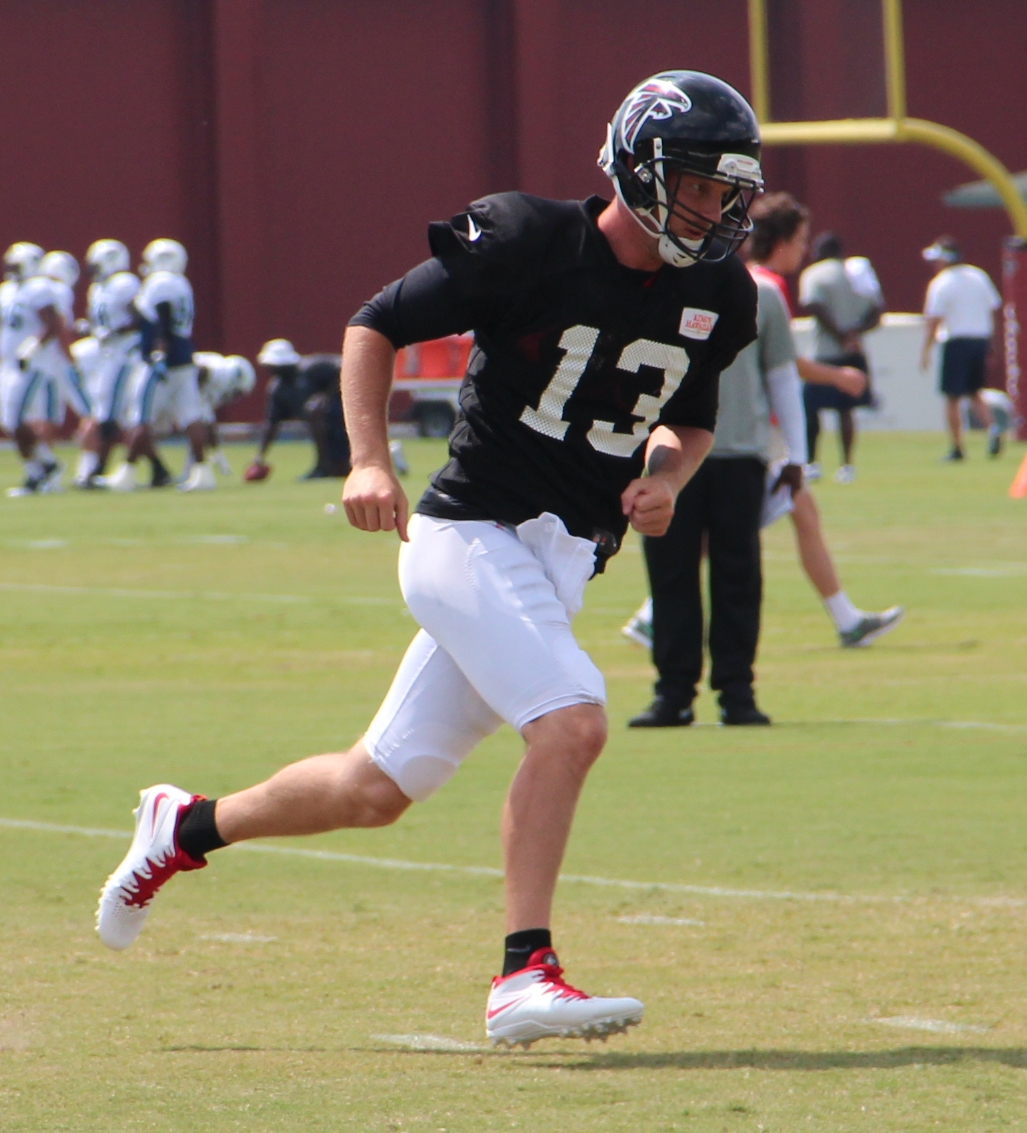
Yates with the Falcons in 2014

On June 18, 2014, Yates was traded to the Atlanta Falcons in return for linebacker Akeem Dent. On September 18, when the Falcons built a 49–0 lead against the Tampa Bay Buccaneers, Yates had his only playing time of the season, throwing 3-of-4 for 64 yards and one interception. He was released by the Falcons on September 4, 2015, as part of their final roster cuts.

=== Houston Texans (second stint) ===
Yates was signed by the Texans on October 27, 2015, after the team cut quarterback Ryan Mallett. He was signed to serve as a backup to Brian Hoyer. After Hoyer went out with an injury during a November 16 game against the Cincinnati Bengals, Yates replaced him in the third quarter, and eventually won the game 10–6 over the Bengals. In the game, Yates completed 5 of 11 passes for 69 yards and a touchdown. On December 20, Yates suffered a torn ACL in a game versus the Indianapolis Colts. The next day, Yates was placed on season-ending injured reserve.

=== Miami Dolphins ===
Yates was signed by the Miami Dolphins on December 13, 2016, after a knee injury to Ryan Tannehill. After starting quarterback Matt Moore was hit hard by Pittsburgh Steelers linebacker Bud Dupree in the AFC Wild Card Round on January 8, 2017, Yates appeared for one snap but Moore then returned to the game.

=== Buffalo Bills ===
Yates was signed by the Buffalo Bills on April 10, 2017. He was placed on injured reserve on September 5, with a concussion. Yates was released by Buffalo on September 12, after agreeing to an injury settlement.

=== Houston Texans (third stint) ===
On November 3, 2017, Yates signed with the Texans after a season-ending ACL injury to starter Deshaun Watson. Head coach Bill O'Brien said that Yates would be the backup to Tom Savage for the November 5 game against the Indianapolis Colts. On December 10 against the San Francisco 49ers, Yates entered the game late in the second quarter after Savage suffered a concussion. Yates completed 14-of-26 passes for 176 yards and two touchdowns as the Texans lost by a score of 26–16. Due to Savage's injury, Yates started the final three games of the season. In Week 15, against the Jacksonville Jaguars, he finished 12-of-31 for 128 yards, one touchdown, and one interception in the 45–7 loss. On Christmas Day, against the Pittsburgh Steelers, he finished with 83 passing yards, one touchdown, and one interception in the 34–6 loss. In the regular season finale, in the second divisional game against the Indianapolis Colts, he finished with 137 passing yards and an interception in the 22–13 loss.

== Coaching career ==
=== Houston Texans ===
On February 5, 2019, Yates was hired as an offensive assistant by the Texans to replace Wes Welker.

After the 2019 NFL season, Yates was promoted to assistant quarterbacks coach.

=== Atlanta Falcons ===
On January 30, 2021, Yates was hired as a passing game specialist by the Atlanta Falcons. On March 22, 2022, he became the team's wide receivers coach.

On January 29, 2024, the Falcons promoted Yates to become the team's quarterbacks coach. On February 13, 2025, he was again promoted, becoming the team's passing game coordinator. Following the firing of Ike Hilliard on September 22, Yates assumed wide receiver coaching duties, in addition to his role as passing game coordinator.

=== Tampa Bay Buccaneers ===
On February 2, 2026, Yates was hired by the Tampa Bay Buccaneers to serve as the team's passing game coordinator.

== Career statistics ==
=== NFL ===
Legend
**Bold**	Career high

==== Regular season ====
Year	Team	Games			Passing								Rushing				Fumbles	
Year	Team	GP	GS	Record	Cmp	Att	Pct	Yds	Avg	TD	Int	Rtg	Att	Yds	Avg	TD	Fum	Lost
2011	HOU	**6**	**5**	2–3	**82**	**134**	61.2	**949**	7.1	3	**3**	**80.7**	**14**	**57**	4.1	0	**5**	**3**
2012	HOU	4	0	0–0	4	10	40.0	38	3.8	0	1	11.7	2	−1	−0.5	**1**	2	1
2013	HOU	3	0	0–0	15	22	68.2	113	5.1	0	2	42.4	1	0	0.0	0	1	0
2014	ATL	1	0	0–0	3	4	**75.0**	64	**16.0**	0	1	77.1	0	0	0.0	0	0	0
2015	HOU	4	2	**2–0**	28	57	49.1	370	6.5	3	1	80.3	6	0	0.0	0	1	1
2016	MIA	0	0	Did not play														
2017	HOU	4	3	0–3	47	97	48.5	523	5.4	**4**	**3**	65.8	5	51	**10.2**	0	**5**	1
Career		22	10	4–6	179	324	55.2	2,057	6.3	10	11	70.7	28	107	3.8	1	14	6

==== Postseason ====
Year	Team	Games			Passing								Rushing				Fumbles	
Year	Team	GP	GS	Record	Cmp	Att	Pct	Yds	Avg	TD	Int	Rtg	Att	Yds	Avg	TD	Fum	Lost
2011	HOU	2	2	1–1	28	55	50.9	343	6.2	1	3	53.8	2	−3	−1.5	0	0	0
2012	HOU	0	0	Did not play														
2015	HOU	0	0	Did not play due to injury														
2016	MIA	0	0	Did not play														
Career		2	2	1–1	28	55	50.9	343	6.2	1	3	53.8	2	-3	-1.5	0	0	0

=== College ===
Season	Team	Passing						
Season	Team	Cmp	Att	Pct	Yds	TD	Int	Rtg
2006	North Carolina	(redshirt) Redshirted						
2007	North Carolina	218	365	59.7	2,655	14	**18**	123.6
2008	North Carolina	81	135	60.0	1,168	11	4	**153.6**
2009	North Carolina	214	355	60.3	2,136	14	15	115.4
2010	North Carolina	**282**	**422**	**66.8**	**3,418**	**19**	9	145.5
Career		795	1,277	62.3	9,377	58	46	131.7
