= Bryn Renner =

American football player and coach (born 1990)

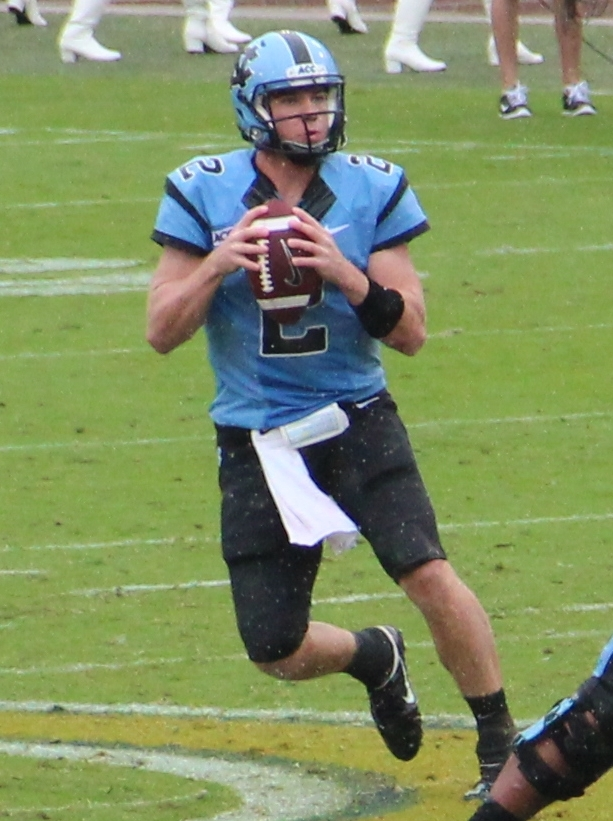
- Renner with North Carolina in 2013

No. 2, 8, 9
- Position: Quarterback

Personal information
- Born: January 22, 1990 (age 36); West Springfield, Virginia, U.S.
- Listed height: 6 ft 2.25 in (1.89 m)
- Listed weight: 230 lb (104 kg)

Career information
- High school: West Springfield (VA)
- College: North Carolina (2009–2013)
- NFL draft: 2014: undrafted

Career history

Playing
- Denver Broncos (2014)*; Arizona Rattlers (2015)*; Baltimore Ravens (2015); Tennessee Titans (2015)*; San Diego Chargers (2016)*; Pittsburgh Steelers (2016)*
- * Offseason or practice squad member only

Coaching
- FIU (2017–2018) Recruiting coordinator; FIU (2019–2020) Cornerbacks coach; FIU (2021) Quarterbacks coach; La Jolla HS (CA) (2022–2023) Quarterbacks coach
- Stats at Pro Football Reference

Bryn Renner (born January 22, 1990) is an American former football quarterback. He played college football at the University of North Carolina from 2009 to 2013 for head coaches Butch Davis, Everett Withers, and Larry Fedora. He was the starter for the Tar Heels from 2011 to 2013.

After going undrafted in the 2014 NFL draft, Renner signed with the Denver Broncos and subsequently became a member of the Arizona Rattlers of the Arena Football League (AFL), Baltimore Ravens, Tennessee Titans, San Diego Chargers, and Pittsburgh Steelers, mostly on their practice squads.

== Early life ==
Renner attended West Springfield High School in West Springfield, Virginia, where he threw for 3,123 yards and 35 touchdowns as a senior. In his junior year, he guided the Spartans to the 6A Northern Region Championship game where the Spartans lost 58–34 to the eventual state champion Westfield Bulldogs, led by quarterback Mike Glennon. In his senior year, he guided the Spartans to the regional semi-finals where they fell to Oakton High School, led by St. Louis Rams running back Trey Watts. He was selected as a SuperPrep All-American and ranked as the No. 3 quarterback in the United States. During his time at West Springfield, Renner also played for the school's basketball and baseball teams. His father Bill Renner, a former punter for the Green Bay Packers in the National Football League, was his high school coach.

== College career ==
He enrolled at the University of North Carolina in 2009 and was a redshirt during his freshman year. Prior to attending the University of North Carolina, Renner worked out for the New York Yankees of the MLB. A standout high school baseball player, Renner initially wanted to compete for both the school's football and baseball teams, but eventually decided to concentrate solely on football.

After appearing in several games as a backup behind T. J. Yates during his redshirt freshman season in 2010, he became North Carolina's starting quarterback as a redshirt sophomore in the 2011 football season. In his first game as North Carolina's starting quarterback, Renner completed 22 of 23 passes and set North Carolina and Atlantic Coast Conference records for passing accuracy. During the 2011 regular season, Renner completed 212 of 308 passes for 2,769 yards and 23 touchdowns. His quarterback rating of 161.2 ranked 10th among all NCAA Division I FBS quarterbacks.

Renner followed up his impressive 2011 campaign during the 2012 season, completing over 65% of his passes for 3,356 yards, 28 touchdowns, and only 7 interceptions. His 7 interceptions ranked among the lowest in NCAA FBS among eligible Quarterbacks. His best game came in a 34–39 loss to the Louisville Cardinals led by Big East Conference Offensive Player of the Year, Teddy Bridgewater. Renner completed 26 of 41 passes for 363 yards and a career-high 5 touchdowns. He was named Honorable Mention All-ACC by coaches and media.

Prior to the 2013 season, Renner was named to the Maxwell Award watch list, given annually to the best college football player in the country, as well as the Davey O'Brien Award watch list, given to the nation's best quarterback. Praising his performance at the Manning Passing Academy, NFL Network draft analyst Mike Mayock said Renner looked "polished" and would not be surprised if he was a first-round pick in the 2014 NFL draft. However, his season ended after seven games due to a shoulder injury he suffered against NC State. For the season he had 1,765 passing yards and 10 touchdowns.

=== College statistics ===
Season	GP	Passing						
Season	GP	Cmp	Att	Pct	Yds	TD	Int	Rtg
2009	0	Redshirted						
2010	2	1	2	50.0	14	0	0	108.8
2011	13	239	350	68.3	3,086	26	13	159.4
2012	12	276	422	65.4	3,356	28	7	150.8
2013	7	152	231	65.8	1,765	10	5	139.9
Career	34	668	1,005	66.5	8,221	64	25	151.2

== Professional ==
After going undrafted in the 2014 NFL draft, Renner signed with the Denver Broncos as a free agent. The Broncos waived Renner on August 24, 2014.

On October 8, 2014, Renner was signed by the Arizona Rattlers of the Arena Football League (AFL).

On January 12, 2015, Renner signed with the Baltimore Ravens. On September 5, 2015, he was released by the Ravens. On September 6, 2015, he was signed to the Ravens' practice squad. On September 16, 2015, he was cut by the Ravens. Renner was resigned to the Ravens' practice squad on December 9, 2015 and promoted to the active roster on December 12. He was released later that week after the Ravens signed former Texans QB Ryan Mallett.

On December 23, 2015, it was announced that Renner had been signed to the Tennessee Titans practice squad.

Renner was signed by the San Diego Chargers on March 30, 2016.

On August 20, 2016, Renner was signed by the Pittsburgh Steelers. On September 3, 2016, he was released by the Steelers as part of final roster cuts.

== Coaching ==
In 2017, Renner followed the coach who had recruited him as a player to UNC, Butch Davis, to FIU where he was hired as the recruiting coordinator. After two years, he was elevated to the on-field coaching staff, serving for the 2019 and 2020 seasons as the Panthers' cornerbacks coach. In 2021, Davis' final season as head coach, Renner was made quarterbacks coach. Following the season, Davis' contract was not renewed, and Renner was not retained by new coach Mike MacIntyre.

He has since moved to San Diego, CA, and in June 2022, he was hired to the staff of La Jolla High School's football team, working with the quarterbacks.

== Personal life ==
On February 26, 2021, Renner proposed to CBS Sports reporter Amanda Balionis. The couple were married in 2022 but they separated in 2024.
