= Hilee Taylor =

American gridiron football player (born 1986)

No. 66, 59, 97
- Position: Defensive end

Personal information
- Born: July 18, 1986 (age 40); Laurinburg, North Carolina, U.S.
- Listed height: 6 ft 3 in (1.91 m)
- Listed weight: 255 lb (116 kg)

Career information
- High school: Scotland (Laurinburg)
- College: North Carolina
- NFL draft: 2008: 7th round, 221st overall pick

Career history
- Carolina Panthers (2008–2010); Detroit Lions (2011)*; Tampa Bay Buccaneers (2012); Saskatchewan Roughriders (2013)
- * Offseason or practice squad member only

Awards and highlights
- Grey Cup champion (2013); Second-team All-ACC (2007)

Career NFL statistics
- Total tackles: 6
- Sacks: 1
- Fumble recoveries: 1
- Stats at Pro Football Reference

Hilee Delano Taylor (born July 18, 1986) is an American former professional football player who was a defensive end in the National Football League (NFL) and Canadian Football League (CFL). He was selected by the Carolina Panthers in the seventh round of the 2008 NFL draft. He played college football for the North Carolina Tar Heels. He was also a member of the Detroit Lions and Tampa Bay Buccaneers of the NFL, as well as the Saskatchewan Roughriders of the CFL.

== Early and personal life ==
Taylor began playing football at the early age of 5.

== College career ==
As a senior at the University of North Carolina at Chapel Hill, Taylor led the Tar Heels and finished tied for 11th in the nation with 10.5 sacks. He also registered 16 of his 49 tackles for loss and forced three fumbles.

== Professional career ==
Taylor was selected in the seventh round of the 2008 NFL draft by the Carolina Panthers. In three seasons in Carolina, he recorded four tackles and one sack. After the 2011 NFL Lockout ended, he was waived by the Panthers and claimed off waivers by the Detroit Lions. However, he opted not to report to the Lions and retired from football. On November 9, Taylor unretired and was reinstated by the NFL. He was released by the Lions following his reinstatement.

On May 6, 2012, Taylor signed with the Tampa Bay Buccaneers.

On March 15, 2013, Taylor signed a two-year contract with the Saskatchewan Roughriders in the Canadian Football League.
