= Quinshad Davis =

American gridiron football player (born 1994)

Southern Miss Golden Eagles
- Title: Wide receivers coach

Personal information
- Born: May 24, 1994 (age 32); Gaffney, South Carolina, U.S.
- Listed height: 6 ft 3 in (1.91 m)
- Listed weight: 220 lb (100 kg)

Career information
- High school: Gaffney
- College: North Carolina
- NFL draft: 2016: undrafted

Career history

Playing
- Detroit Lions (2016)*; Winnipeg Blue Bombers (2017)
- * Offseason or practice squad member only

Coaching
- North Carolina (2018–2019) Graduate assistant; South Florida (2020–2021) Offensive quality control assistant; Georgia State (2022–2025) Wide receivers coach; Southern Miss (2026–present) Wide receivers coach

Awards and highlights
- Third-team All-ACC (2015)
- Stats at Pro Football Reference

Quinshad Davis (born May 24, 1994) is an American college football coach and former wide receiver. He is the wide receivers coach for the Southern Miss Golden Eagles. He played college football for the North Carolina Tar Heels, where he holds the school record for career touchdown receptions. He played professional football for the Detroit Lions of the National Football League (NFL).

== Early life ==
Davis was born in Gaffney, South Carolina, on May 24, 1994. He attended Gaffney High School in Gaffney, South Carolina. Davis caught 94 passes for 1,481 yards and 16 touchdowns as a junior. As a senior, he caught 108 passes for 2,009 yards and 25 touchdowns and helped lead Gaffney to a 13–1 record and an appearance in the South Carolina state championship game. He received many accolades following the conclusion of his high school football career. Davis was chosen as a Parade All-American and named Gatorade Player of the Year for the state of South Carolina.

== College recruitment ==
College recruiting
Name	Hometown	School	Height	Weight	40^{‡}	Commit date
Quinshad Davis; WR	Gaffney, SC	Gaffney HS	6 ft 4 in (1.93 m)	220 lb (100 kg)	4.65	Feb 1, 2012
Quinshad Davis; WR	Recruit ratings: Scout: Rivals: (79)					
Overall recruit ranking: Scout: 20 (WR) Rivals: 34 (WR), 223 (National)
‡ Refers to 40-yard dash; Note: In many cases, Scout, Rivals, 247Sports, On3, and ESPN may conflict in their listings of height, weight and 40 time.; In these cases, the average was taken. ESPN grades are on a 100-point scale.; Sources: "North Carolina Commit List for 2012". Rivals.; "Scout.com Football Recruiting: North Carolina". Scout.; "RecruitTracker 2012: North Carolina". ESPN.; "Scout.com Team Recruiting Rankings". Scout.; "2012 Team Ranking". Rivals.com.

== College career ==
As a freshman, Davis played a considerable amount under first-year head coach Larry Fedora's uptempo, offensively focused offense, and immediately saw considerable success with the Tar Heels. A primary receiving target for quarterback Bryn Renner, Davis appeared in all twelve of UNC's games, starting the final ten games, and catching 61 passes for 776 yards over the course of the season, including five touchdowns. Davis set school freshman records for receptions and yards, and his 61 catches were the second-highest freshman total in ACC history and his 776 yards were fourth-most all-time.

As a sophomore, Davis earned All-ACC honorable mention honors after completing the regular season with 48 catches for 730 yards and a team-high ten touchdowns. His 109 career receptions over the course of his first two seasons are the second-most for a Tar Heel, behind only the 113 receptions set by Hakeem Nicks. Davis also completed a 32-yard touchdown pass to T.J. Thorpe against the East Carolina Pirates, which marked his first career pass completion.

Davis' junior season saw the Tar Heels add several potent offensive weapons at wide receiver and running back, but the team took a step backward in terms of overall record owing to the team's severe defensive struggles. He finished the season with 41 catches for 470 yards and six scores, tying Hakeem Nicks for most career touchdowns by a Tar Heel receiver. In Carolina's bowl game against Rutgers, Davis broke his right tibia while attempting to catch a pass in the end zone for a touchdown and had to be assisted off of the field.

The Tar Heels saw their most success during Davis' senior year, during which he was a significant weapon in the potent Carolina offense. Davis started all 14 games of the 2015 season, during which he became the Tar Heels' career leader in receptions and receiving touchdowns, and finished with a team-high 55 receptions for 638 yards and four touchdowns. In perhaps what was the highlight of the season, Davis caught the winning touchdown in Lane Stadium in Virginia Tech coach Frank Beamer's final home game. The Tar Heels won the ACC Coastal Division before falling, controversially, to the Clemson Tigers in the ACC Championship game by a single touchdown. Davis graduated as UNC's career leader in receptions (a record that has since been surpassed by Ryan Switzer) and career touchdown receptions.

== Professional career ==
Pre-draft measurables
Height	Weight	Arm length	Hand span	Wingspan	40-yard dash	10-yard split	20-yard split	20-yard shuttle	Three-cone drill	Vertical jump	Broad jump	Bench press
6 ft 3 3/8 in (1.91 m)	218 lb (99 kg)	33 3/8 in (0.85 m)	9 5/8 in (0.24 m)	6 ft 7 3/4 in (2.03 m)	4.69 s	1.71 s	2.75 s	4.35 s	7.07 s	31.5 in (0.80 m)	9 ft 5 in (2.87 m)	17 reps
All values from Pro Day

=== Detroit Lions ===
After going undrafted in the 2016 NFL draft, Davis signed with the Detroit Lions. On September 3, 2016, he was waived by the Lions.

=== Winnipeg Blue Bombers ===
On April 12, 2017, Davis and the Winnipeg Blue Bombers (CFL) agreed to a contract. He was released on June 12.

== Coaching career ==
In 2018, Davis joined North Carolina as a graduate assistant.

In 2020, Davis joined South Florida an offensive quality control coach.

In 2022, Davis joined Georgia State as the wide receivers coach.

In 2026, Davis was named wide receivers coach at Southern Miss.
