= List of North Carolina Tar Heels in the NFL draft =

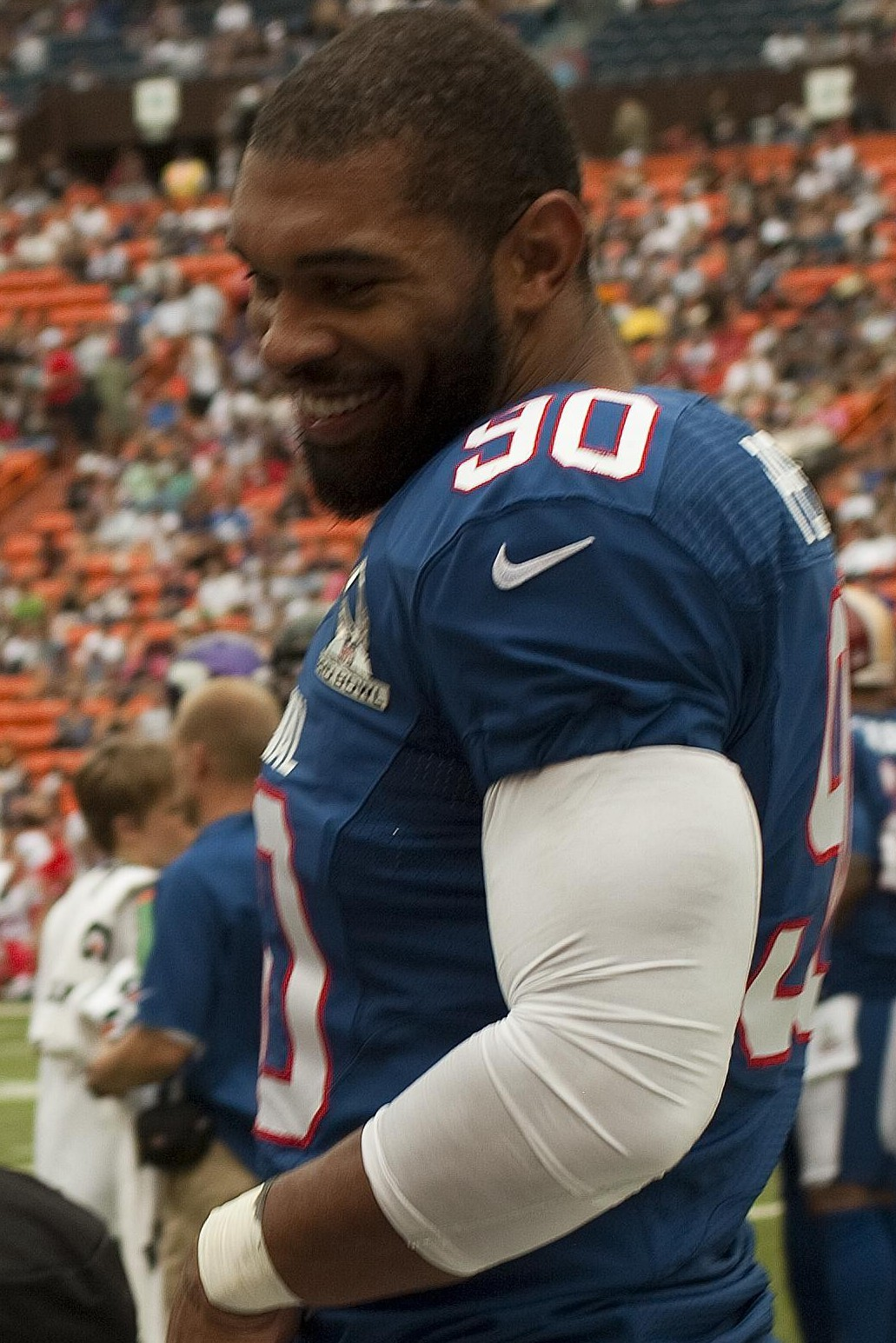
Julius Peppers was drafted 2nd overall by the Carolina Panthers in the 2002 NFL Draft.

The North Carolina Tar Heels football team, representing the University of North Carolina at Chapel Hill, has had 225 American football players drafted into the National Football League (NFL) since the league began holding drafts in 1936. (Note: Because of the NFL–AFL merger agreement, the history of the AFL is officially recognized by the NFL and therefore this list includes the AFL draft (1960–1966) and the Common Draft (1967–1969).) The highest that a Tar Heel has ever been drafted is second overall, which has happened on four occasions: Ken Willard in 1965, Lawrence Taylor in 1981, Julius Peppers in 2002, and Mitch Trubisky in 2017 The Buffalo Bills and Washington Redskins have drafted the most Tar Heels with sixteen and fifteen, respectively. Every current NFL franchise has drafted a player from North Carolina.

Each NFL franchise seeks to add new players through the annual NFL Draft. The draft rules were last updated in 2009. The team with the worst record the previous year picks first, the next-worst team second, and so on. Teams that did not make the playoffs are ordered by their regular-season record, with any remaining ties broken by strength of schedule. Playoff participants are sequenced after non-playoff teams, based on their round of elimination (wild card, division, conference, and Super Bowl).

Before the merger agreements in 1966, the American Football League (AFL) operated in direct competition with the NFL and held a separate draft. This led to a massive bidding war over top prospects between the two leagues, along with the subsequent drafting of the same player in each draft. As part of the merger agreement on June 8, 1966, the two leagues held a multiple round "Common Draft". Once the AFL officially merged with the NFL in 1970, the "Common Draft" simply became the NFL Draft.

Twenty-five Tar Heels have been drafted in the first round of the NFL Draft, with the most recent being Omarion Hampton in 2025. The single first round of the NFL Draft with the most Tar Heels selected was 1998 with three: Greg Ellis, Brian Simmons, and Vonnie Holliday. Of the Tar Heels selected in the NFL Draft, fifteen have been selected to a Pro Bowl, seventeen have been a member of a Super Bowl winning team; four have achieved both. The most Tar Heels selected in a single NFL Draft is nine, in 2011. Both Chris Hanburger and Taylor are in the Pro Football Hall of Fame.

== Key ==
B	Back (Note: In American and Canadian football, a back is a player who is lined up behind the linemen, the players who line up closest to the line of scrimmage.)	K	Kicker	NT	Nose tackle
C	Center	LB	Linebacker	FB	Fullback
DB	Defensive back	P	Punter	HB	Halfback
DE	Defensive end	QB	Quarterback	WR	Wide receiver
DT	Defensive tackle	RB	Running back	G	Guard
E	End	T	Offensive tackle	TE	Tight end

*	Selected to a Pro Bowl
†	Won a Super Bowl championship
‡	Selected to a Pro Bowl and won a Super Bowl

== Players selected ==
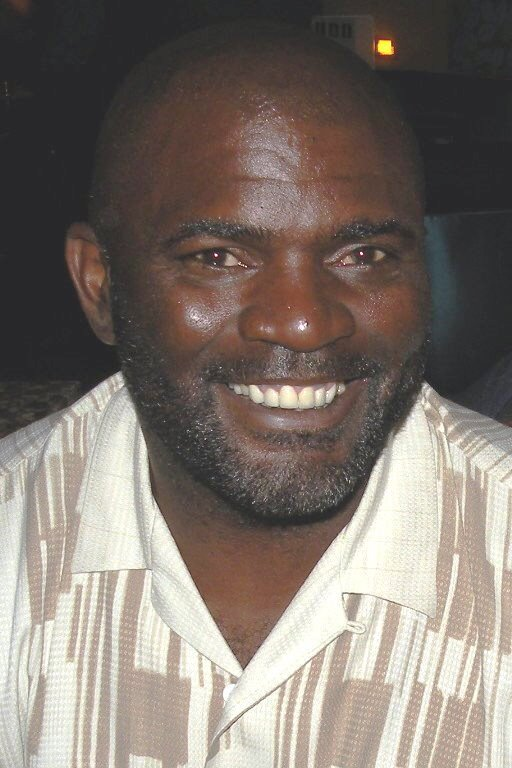
Lawrence Taylor was drafted 2nd overall by the New York Giants in the 1982 NFL Draft.

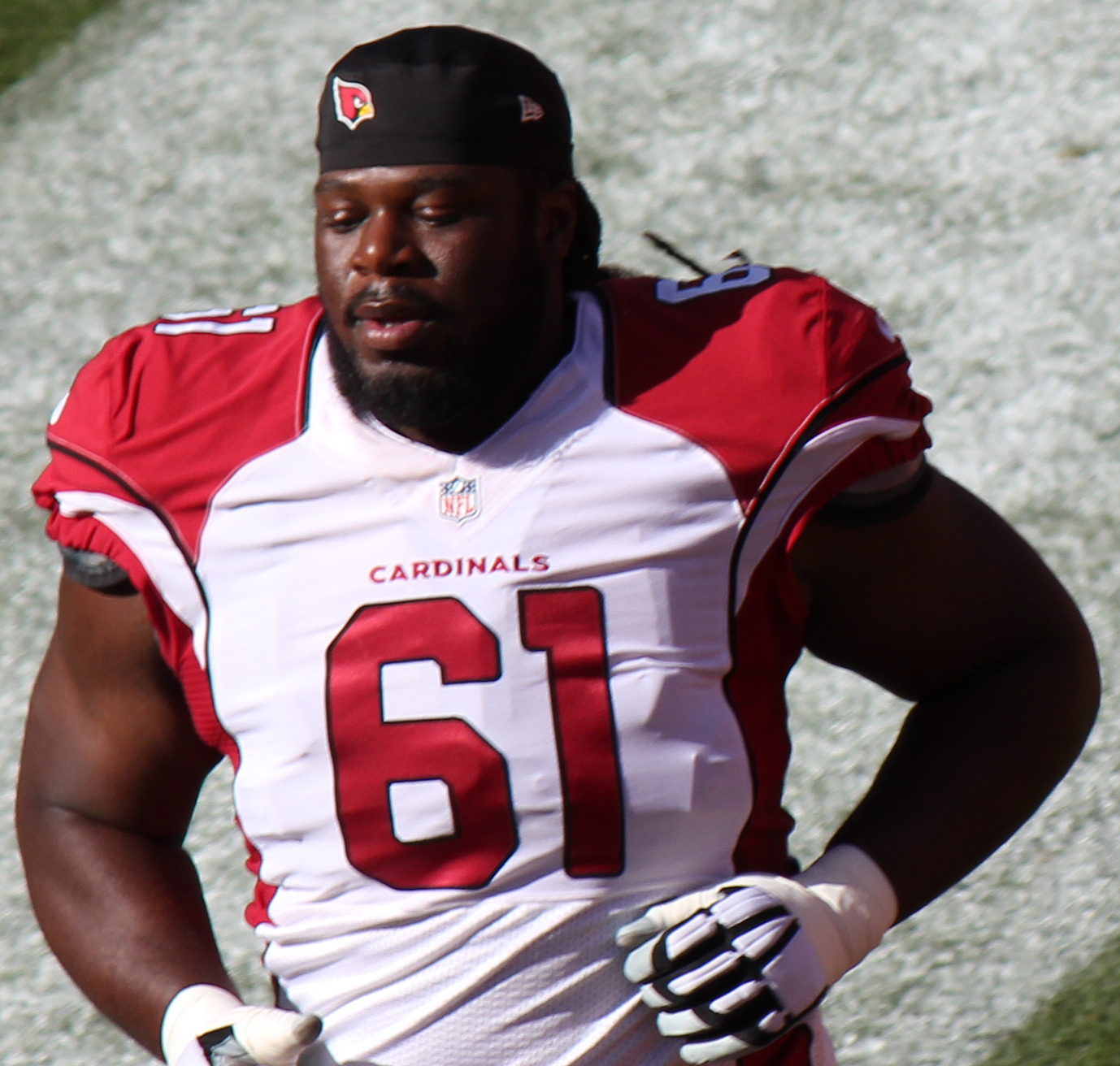
Jonathan Cooper was selected by the Arizona Cardinals as the 7th overall draft pick in the 2013 NFL Draft.

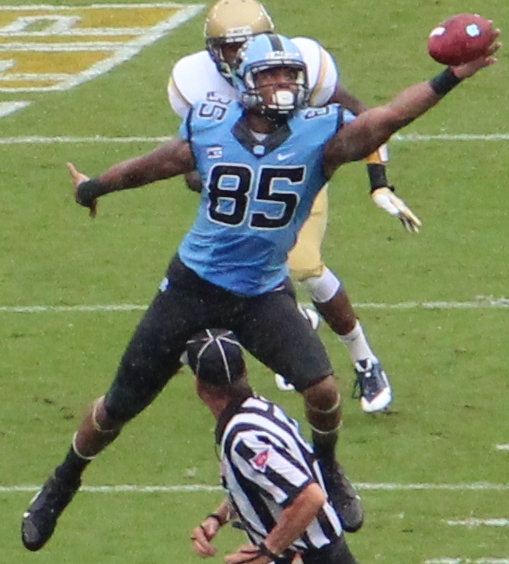
Eric Ebron was selected by the Detroit Lions as the 10th overall draft pick in the 2014 NFL Draft.

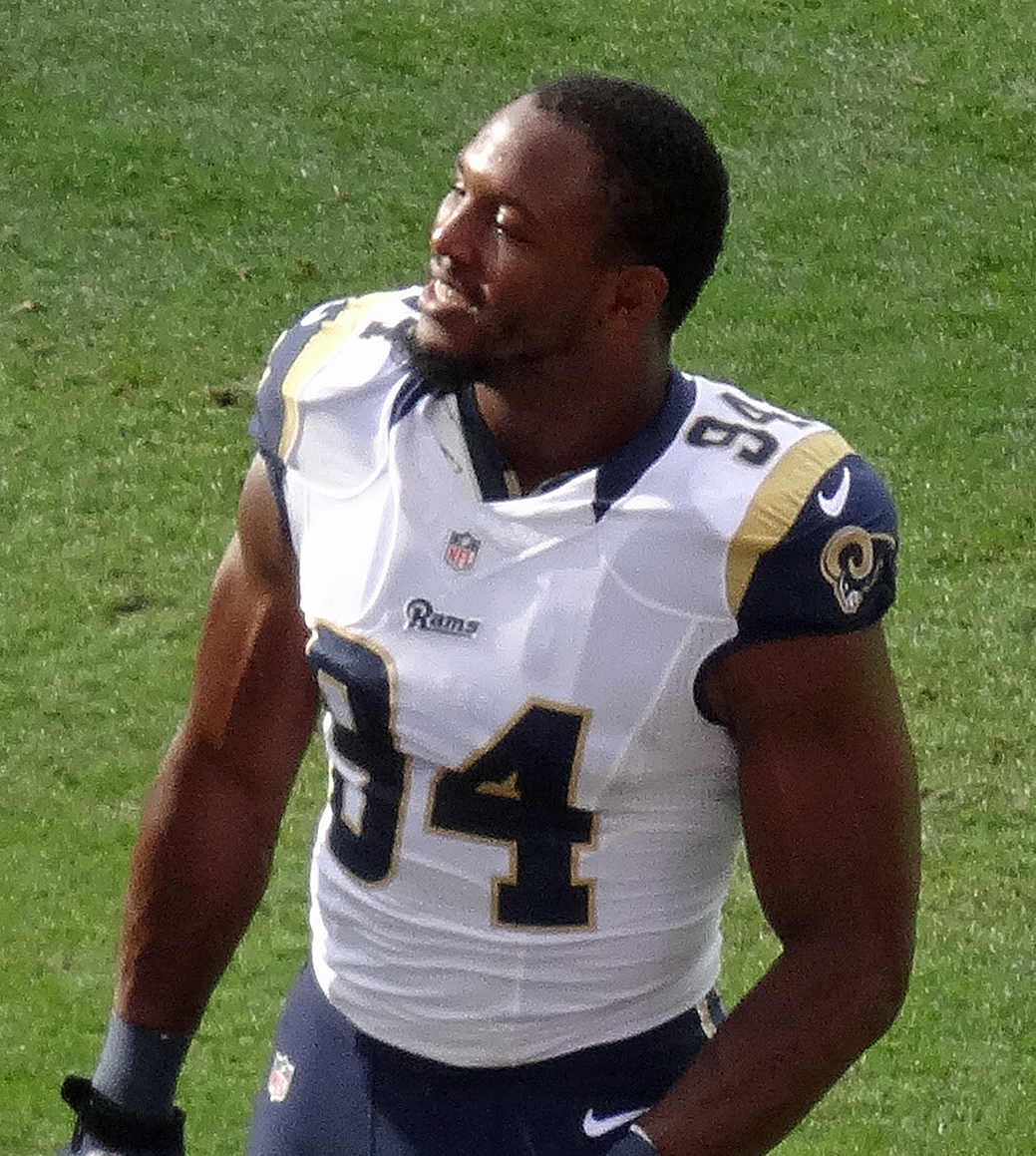
Robert Quinn was selected by the St. Louis Rams as the 14th overall draft pick in the 2011 NFL Draft.

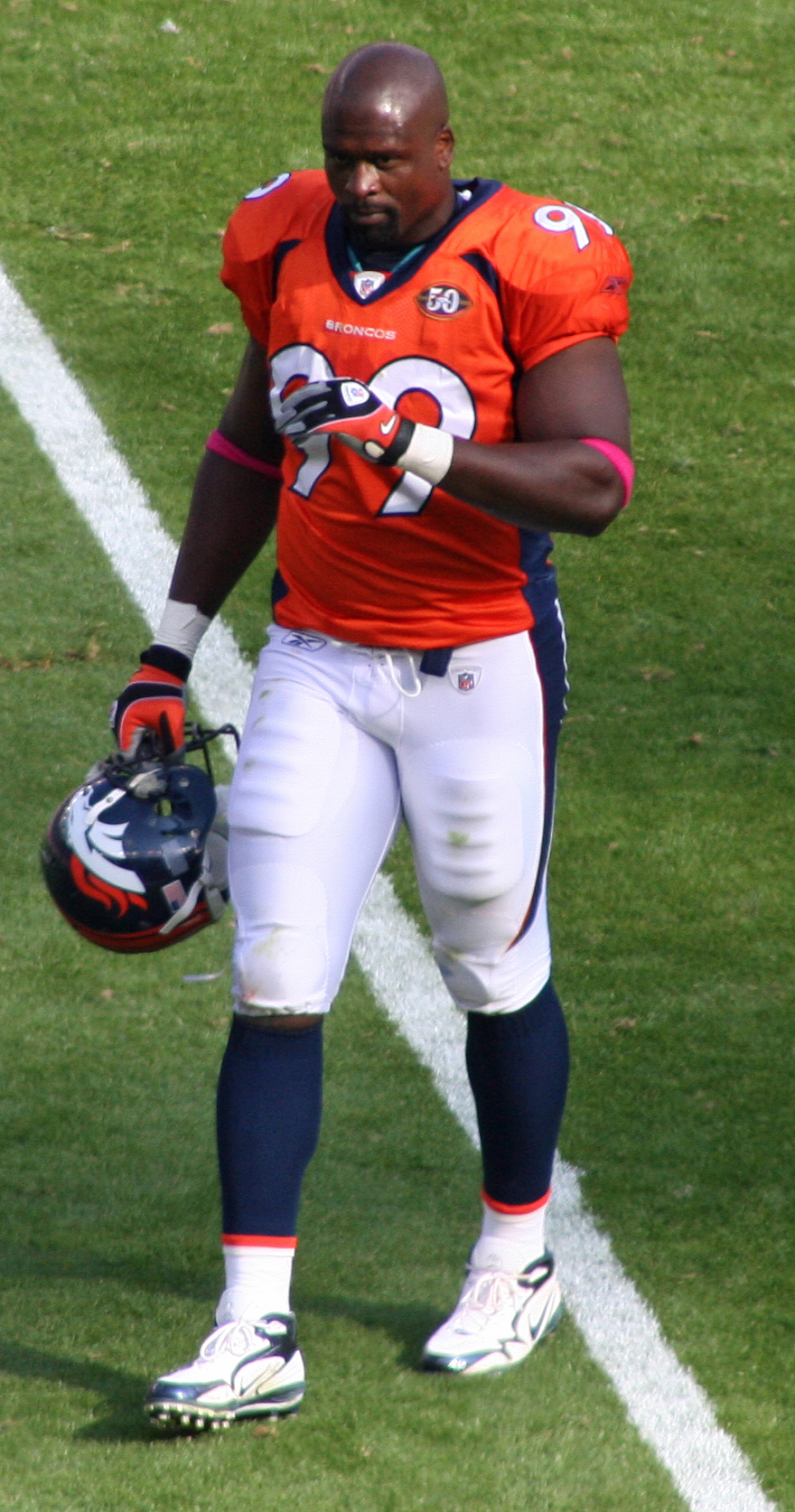
Vonnie Holliday was drafted 19th overall by the Green Bay Packers in the 1998 NFL Draft.

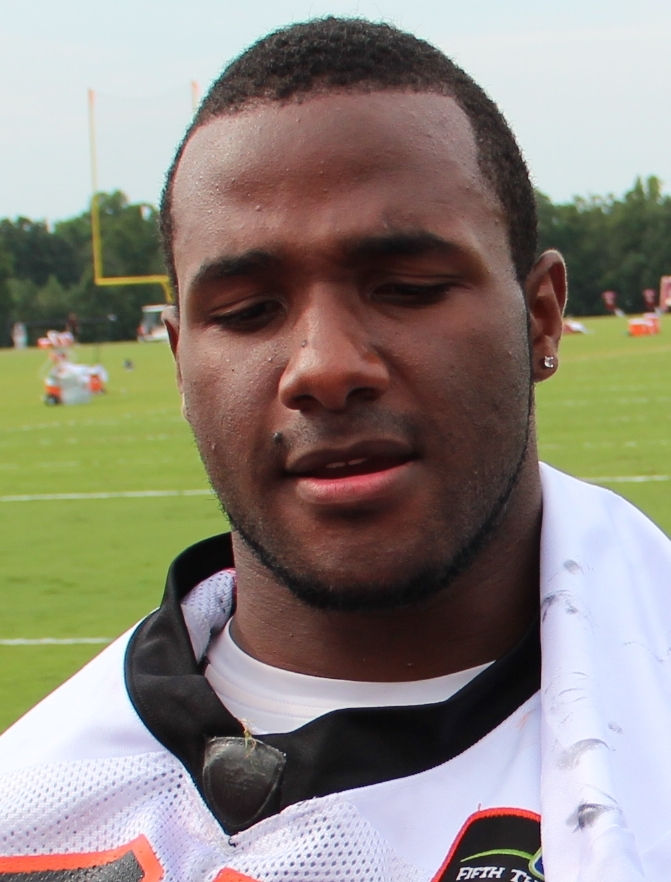
Giovani Bernard was selected by the Cincinnati Bengals as the 37th overall draft pick in the 2013 NFL Draft.

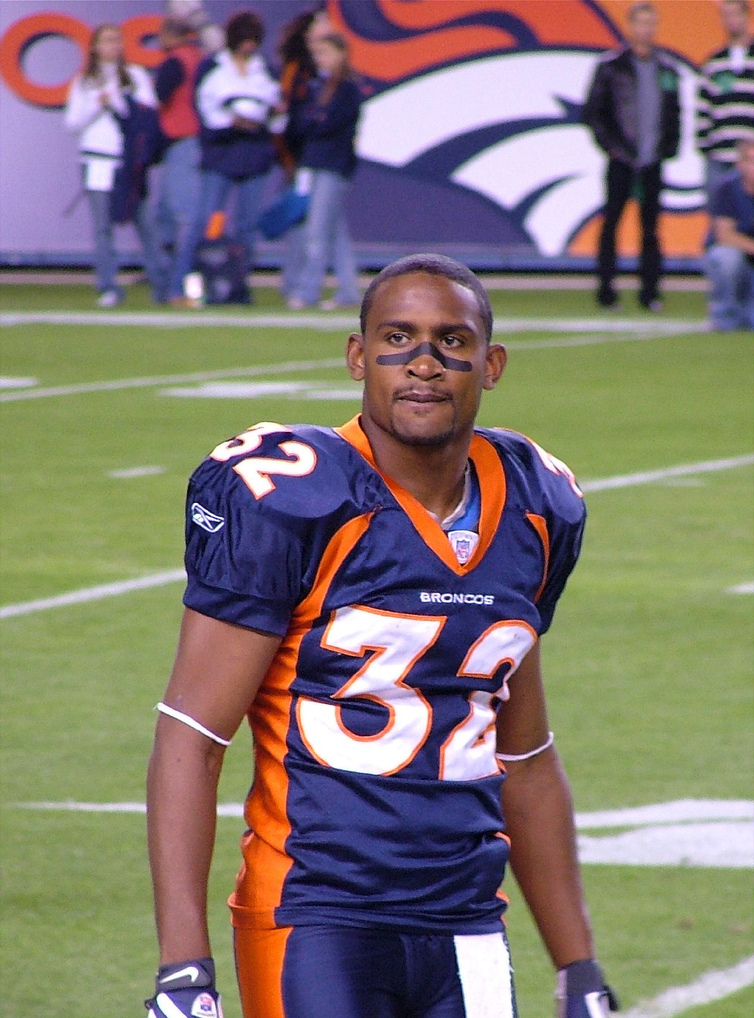
Dré Bly was drafted 41st overall by the St. Louis Rams in the 1999 NFL Draft.

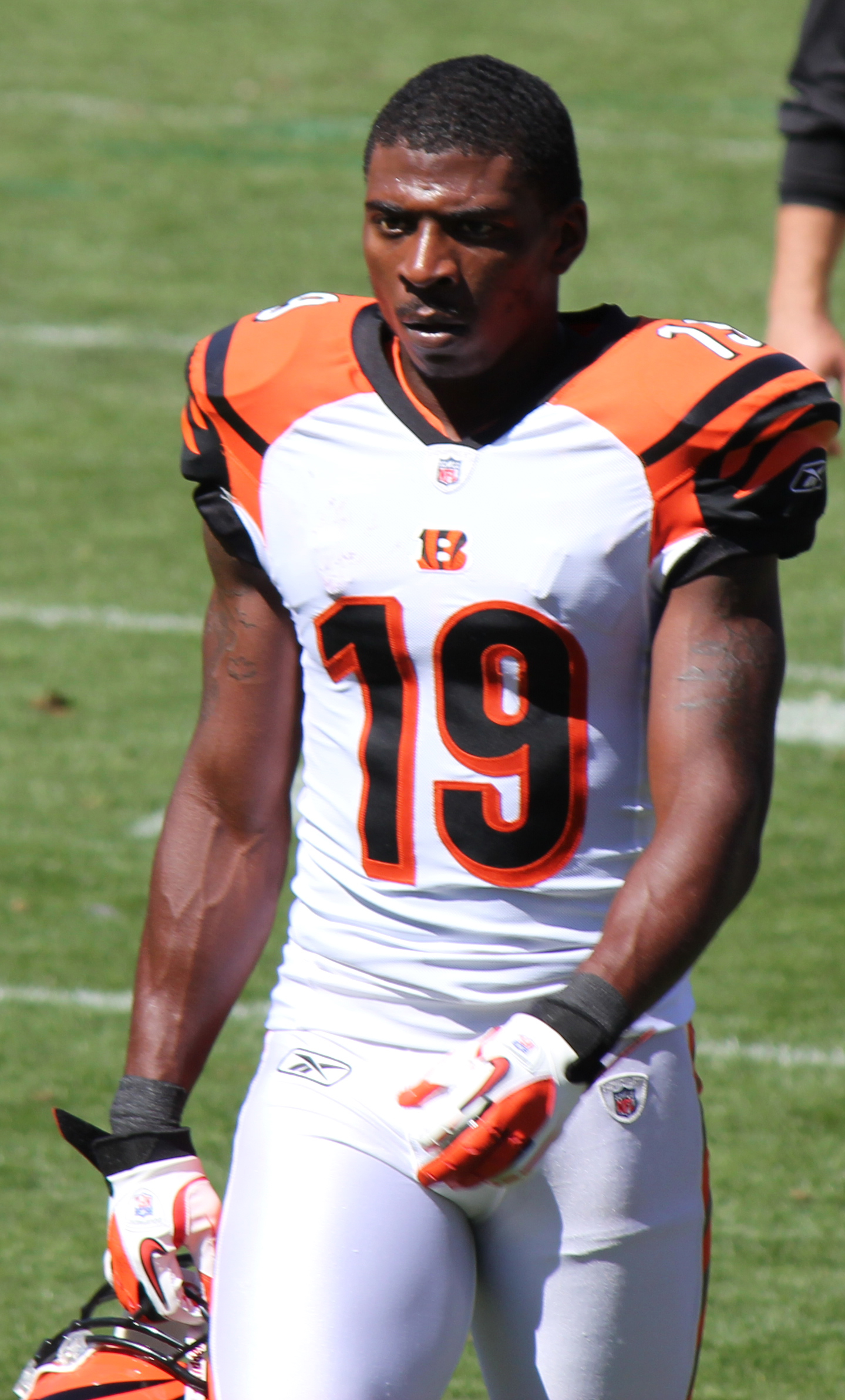
Brandon Tate was drafted 83rd overall by the New England Patriots in the 2009 NFL Draft.

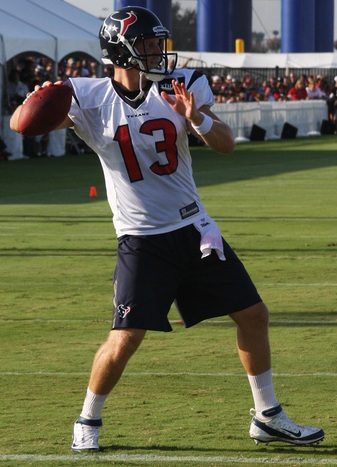
T. J. Yates was selected by the Houston Texans as the 152nd overall draft pick in the 2011 NFL Draft.

North Carolina Tar Heels selected in the NFL/AFL Drafts
Year	Round	Pick	Overall	Name	Position	Team	Notes
1938	5	6	36	Andy Bershak	E	Detroit Lions	—
1938	8	4	64	Tom Burnette	B, FB	Pittsburgh Pirates	—
1938	12	9	109	Henry Bartos	G	Washington Redskins	—
1939	5	7	35	Steve Maronic	T	Detroit Lions	—
1939	12	4	104	Jack Kraynick	B	Philadelphia Eagles	—
1939	14	10	130	George Watson	B	New York Giants	—
1940	2	1	11	George Stirnweiss	B	Chicago Cardinals	—
1940	19	8	178	Charley Slagle	B	Washington Redskins	—
1941	10	8	88	Jim LaLanne	B	Chicago Bears	—
1941	12	2	102	Paul Severin	E	Pittsburgh Steelers	—
1941	16	3	143	Gates Kimball	T	Chicago Cardinals	—
1942	18	4	164	Carl Suntheimer	C	Chicago Cardinals	—
1943	21	6	196	Fred Marshall	G	New York Giants	—
1944	18	6	181	Hugh Cox	B	Green Bay Packers	—
1944	26	6	269	Ray Jordan	B	Green Bay Packers	—
1945	15	4	146	Chan Highsmith	C	Boston Yanks	—
1945	18	2	177	Ralph Strayhorn	G	Chicago Cardinals	—
1946	3	5	20	Hosea Rodgers	FB	New York Giants	—
1946	16	4	144	Ted Hazelwood	T, DT	Chicago Bears	—
1946	28	4	264	Howard Weldon	G	Chicago Bears	—
1946	30	5	285	Bill Voris	B	New York Giants	—
1947	10	4	79	Ernie Williamson	T	Washington Redskins	—
1947	12	3	98	Jack Fitch	B	Pittsburgh Steelers	—
1947	18	10	165	Walt Pupa	B	Chicago Bears	—
1947	28	7	262	Jerrell Baxter	T	Green Bay Packers	—
1947	32	7	300	Don Clayton	B	New York Giants	—
1948	3	10	23	Bill Smith	T	Chicago Cardinals	—
1948	8	10	65	Jim Camp	QB	Chicago Cardinals	—
1949	3	7	28	Len Szafaryn	T, G, LB, DT	Washington Redskins	—
1949	8	2	73	Mike Rubish	E	New York Bulldogs	—
1949	8	7	78	Bob Kennedy	DB, HB	Washington Redskins	—
1949	19	8	189	Bob Mitten	G	Chicago Bears	—
1949	20	1	192	Joe Romano	T	Detroit Lions	—
1949	23	9	230	Bob Cox	E	Chicago Cardinals	—
1949	25	8	249	Stan Marczyk	T	Chicago Bears	—
1950	2	2	16	Art Weiner	E, DE	New York Bulldogs	—
1950	16	5	201	Charlie Justice	HB	Washington Redskins	—
1950	18	8	230	Kenneth Powell	E	Pittsburgh Steelers	—
1951	7	8	82	Irv Holdash	C	Cleveland Browns	—
1951	29	7	346	Roscoe Hansen	T, DT	Philadelphia Eagles	—
1953	6	9	70	Tom Higgins	T, G, DT	Chicago Cardinals	—
1953	16	8	189	Bud Wallace	B	Philadelphia Eagles	—
1954	12	9	142	Jack Maultsby	T	Los Angeles Rams	—
1954	27	7	320	Ken Yarborough	E	Washington Redskins	—
1955	11	3	124	Larry Parker	B	Washington Redskins	—
1956	8	6	91	Bill Koman*	LB	Baltimore Colts	Pro Bowl (1962, 1964)
1956	11	2	123	Stew Pell	T	San Francisco 49ers	—
1956	11	5	126	Ken Keller	HB	Philadelphia Eagles	—
1957	3	8	33	Ed Sutton	HB, DB	Washington Redskins	—
1957	12	3	136	Don Klochak	B	Los Angeles Rams	—
1957	20	4	233	Jack Stillwell	E	Cleveland Browns	—
1958	8	5	90	Buddy Payne	E	Washington Redskins	—
1958	8	12	97	Phil Blazer	G	Detroit Lions	—
1958	10	11	120	Leo Russavage	T	Cleveland Browns	—
1959	3	6	30	Ron Koes	C	Detroit Lions	—
1959	10	3	111	Emil DeCantis	B	Chicago Cardinals	—
1959	10	9	117	Alan Goldstein	E	Los Angeles Rams	—
1959	15	2	170	John Schroeder	E	Chicago Cardinals	—
1959	16	8	188	Don Redding	T	Chicago Bears	—
1959	21	11	251	Fred Swearingen	G	New York Giants	—
1959	30	3	351	Rabe Walton	B	Chicago Cardinals	—
1960	30	3	351	Jack Cummings	QB	Philadelphia Eagles	—
1960	5	4	52	Don Stallings	DT, DE, T	Washington Redskins	—
1960	12	6	138	Earl Butler	T	Pittsburgh Steelers	—
1960	12	10	142	Jim Williams	G	San Francisco 49ers	—
1961^{AFL draft}	2	2	9	Rip Hawkins* (Note: Rip Hawkins was drafted in 1961 by the Boston Patriots (9th overall) and by the Minnesota Vikings (15th overall).)	LB	Boston Patriots	Pro Bowl (1963)
1961^{AFL draft}	11	3	73	Roy Wall	HB	Buffalo Bills	—
1961^{NFL draft}	2	2	15	Rip Hawkins*	LB	Minnesota Vikings	Pro Bowl (1963)
1961^{NFL draft}	11	6	146	Henry Clement	TE	Pittsburgh Steelers	—
1961^{NFL draft}	14	8	190	Bob Elliott (Note: Bob Elliott was drafted in 1961 by the St. Louis Cardinals (190th overall) and in 1962 by the Oakland Raiders (241st overall).)	FB	St. Louis Cardinals	—
1962^{AFL draft}	7	4	52	Jim LeCompte	G	Buffalo Bills	—
1962^{AFL draft}	31	1	241	Bob Elliot	FB	Oakland Raiders	—
1963^{AFL draft}	12	3	91	Joe Craver	LB	New York Jets	—
1964^{AFL draft}	11	3	83	Bob Lacey (Note: Bob Lacey was drafted in 1964 by the New York Jets (83rd overall) and by the Minnesota Vikings (75th overall).)	WR	New York Jets	—
1964^{AFL draft}	22	6	174	Ed Kesler (Note: Ed Kesler was drafted in 1964 by the Houston Oilers (174th overall) and by the Pittsburgh Steelers (219th overall).)	FB	Houston Oilers	—
1964^{NFL draft}	6	5	75	Bob Lacey	WR	Minnesota Vikings	—
1964^{NFL draft}	16	9	219	Ed Kesler	FB	Pittsburgh Steelers	—
1965	1	2	2	Ken Willard*	RB	San Francisco 49ers	Pro Bowl (1965, 1966, 1968, 1969)
1965	18	7	245	Chris Hanburger*	LB	Washington Redskins	Pro Bowl (1966, 1967, 1968, 1969, 1972, 1973, 1974, 1975, 1976)
1967	6	21	159	Bo Wood	DE	New Orleans Saints	—
1967	17	13	432	Danny Talbott	QB	San Francisco 49ers	—
1968	15	23	404	Jeff Beaver	QB	Baltimore Colts	—
1969	4	1	79	Mike Richey	T	Buffalo Bills	—
1971	1	2	22	Don McCauley	RB	Baltimore Colts	—
1971	12	14	159	Tony Blanchard	TE	Cleveland Browns	—
1972	3	4	56	Lewis Jolley	RB	Houston Oilers	—
1972	10	14	248	John Bunting	LB	Philadelphia Eagles	—
1973	14	22	360	Bob Thornton	G	Dallas Cowboys	—
1974	3	15	67	Robert Pratt	G	Baltimore Colts	—
1974	4	12	90	Sammy Johnson	RB	San Francisco 49ers	—
1974	14	1	339	Paul Lamm	DB	Buffalo Bills	—
1975	1	3	3	Ken Huff	G	Baltimore Colts	—
1975	5	21	125	Charles Waddell	TE	San Diego Chargers	—
1975	15	19	383	Chris Kupec	QB	Buffalo Bills	—
1976	8	15	224	James Betterson	RB	Denver Broncos	—
1976	12	4	323	Milton Butts	T	New Orleans Saints	—
1977	3	20	76	Mike Voight	RB	Cincinnati Bengals	—
1977	8	14	209	Mark Griffin	T	Detroit Lions	—
1977	9	25	248	Mark Cantrell	C	Dallas Cowboys	—
1977	10	18	269	Tom Burkett	T	Cleveland Browns	—
1978	2	4	32	Dee Hardison	DE, DT, NT	Buffalo Bills	—
1978	8	5	199	Brooks Williams	TE	New Orleans Saints	—
1978	8	4	202	Walker Lee	WR	Washington Redskins	—
1979	5	11	121	Bob Hukill	G	Dallas Cowboys	—
1979	6	16	153	Dave Simmons	LB	Green Bay Packers	—
1979	6	23	160	Mike Salzano	G	Dallas Cowboys	—
1980	2	8	36	Buddy Curry	LB	Atlanta Falcons	—
1980	5	11	121	Doug Paschal	RB	Minnesota Vikings	—
1980	11	22	297	Phil Farris	WR	Denver Broncos	—
1981	1	2	2	Lawrence Taylor^{‡}	LB	New York Giants	Pro Bowl (1981, 1982, 1983, 1984, 1985, 1986, 1987, 1988, 1989, 1990); Super Bowl champion (XXI, XXV)
1981	1	18	18	Donnell Thompson	DT	Baltimore Colts	—
1981	3	17	73	Rick Donnalley	C, G	Pittsburgh Steelers	—
1981	4	20	103	Amos Lawrence^{†}	RB	San Diego Chargers	Super Bowl champion (XVI)
1981	6	19	157	Ron Wooten	G	New England Patriots	—
1981	6	26	164	Harry Stanback	DE	Atlanta Falcons	—
1982	2	19	46	Calvin Daniels	LB	Kansas City Chiefs	—
1982	6	17	156	Darrell Nicholson	LB	New York Giants	—
1982	8	16	211	Bill Jackson	DB	Cleveland Browns	—
1983	2	8	36	Mike Wilcher	LB	Los Angeles Rams	—
1983	2	20	48	Dave Drechsler	G	Green Bay Packers	—
1983	7	28	196	Kelvin Bryant^{†}	RB	Washington Redskins	Super Bowl champion (XXII)
1984	1	28	28	Brian Blados	T, G	Cincinnati Bengals	—
1984	3	13	69	Tyrone Anthony	RB	New Orleans Saints	—
1984	7	27	195	Mark Smith	WR	Washington Redskins	—
1984	10	10	262	Aaron Jackson	LB	Cincinnati Bengals	—
1985	1	15	15	Ethan Horton*	TE, RB	Kansas City Chiefs	Pro Bowl (1991)
1985	3	17	73	Brian Johnston	C	New York Giants	—
1985	4	9	93	Greg Naron	G	Philadelphia Eagles	—
1985	9	4	228	Micah Moon	LB	Atlanta Falcons	—
1986	8	5	199	Larry Griffin	DB	Houston Oilers	—
1986	9	2	223	Tommy Barnhardt	P	Tampa Bay Buccaneers	—
1986	10	23	272	Carl Carr	LB	New York Jets	—
1986	11	21	303	Arnold Franklin	TE	Miami Dolphins	—
1987	1	22	22	Harris Barton^{‡}	T, G	San Francisco 49ers	Pro Bowl (1992); Super Bowl champion (XXIII, XXIV, XXIX)
1988	4	5	87	Tim Goad	NT, DT	New England Patriots	—
1988	9	4	225	Reuben Davis	DE, DT	Tampa Bay Buccaneers	—
1988	9	14	235	Carlton Bailey	LB	Buffalo Bills	—
1989	3	13	69	Darrell Hamilton	T	Denver Broncos	—
1989	10	17	268	Derrick Fenner	RB	Seattle Seahawks	—
1989	12	12	319	Antonio Goss^{†}	LB	San Francisco 49ers	Super Bowl champion (XXIV, XXIX)
1990	4	14	95	Torin Dorn	DB	Los Angeles Raiders	—
1990	9	24	244	Cecil Gray	DE, T	Philadelphia Eagles	—
1991	3	24	79	Kevin Donnalley	G, T	Houston Oilers	—
1992	3	20	76	Brian Bollinger^{†}	G	San Francisco 49ers	Super Bowl champion (XXIX)
1992	4	13	97	Dwight Hollier	LB	Miami Dolphins	—
1992	4	14	98	Roy Barker	DE, DT	Minnesota Vikings	—
1992	7	6	174	Deems May	TE	San Diego Chargers	—
1992	8	6	202	Eric Blount	WR	Philadelphia Eagles	—
1992	10	5	257	Andrew Oberg	T	Green Bay Packers	—
1993	1	28	28	Thomas Smith	DB	Buffalo Bills	—
1993	2	12	41	Natrone Means*	RB	San Diego Chargers	Pro Bowl (1994)
1993	3	13	69	Rondell Jones	DB	Denver Broncos	—
1993	5	11	123	Tommy Thigpen	LB	New York Giants	—
1994	2	19	48	Bucky Brooks^{†}	DB	Buffalo Bills	Super Bowl champion (XXXI)
1994	4	17	120	Austin Robbins	DT	Los Angeles Raiders	—
1994	4	24	127	Bracy Walker	DB	Kansas City Chiefs	—
1994	4	27	130	Sean Crocker	DB	Buffalo Bills	—
1995	3	2	66	William Henderson^{‡}	FB	Green Bay Packers	Pro Bowl (2004); Super Bowl champion (XXXI); Super Bowl champion (XXXI)
1995	3	24	88	Jimmy Hitchcock	DB	New England Patriots	—
1995	4	20	118	Mike Morton^{†}	LB	Los Angeles Raiders	Super Bowl champion (XXXIV)
1995	6	7	178	Eddie Mason	LB	New York Jets	—
1995	7	28	236	Oscar Sturgis^{†}	DE	Dallas Cowboys	Super Bowl champion (XXX)
1996	1	22	22	Marcus Jones	DE, DT	Tampa Bay Buccaneers	—
1996	5	16	148	Sean Boyd	DB	Minnesota Vikings	—
1997	2	1	31	Rick Terry	DT	New York Jets	—
1997	2	15	45	Freddie Jones	TE	San Diego Chargers	—
1997	3	19	79	James Hamilton	DB	Jacksonville Jaguars	—
1997	4	8	104	Leon Johnson	DB	New York Jets	—
1997	5	14	144	Andre Purvis	DT	Cincinnati Bengals	—
1998	1	8	8	Greg Ellis*	DE	Dallas Cowboys	Pro Bowl (2007)
1998	1	17	17	Brian Simmons	LB	Cincinnati Bengals	—
1998	1	19	19	Vonnie Holliday	DE, DT	Green Bay Packers	—
1998	4	11	103	Omar Brown	DB	Atlanta Falcons	—
1998	4	18	110	Kivuusama Mays	LB	Minnesota Vikings	—
1998	5	5	128	Robert Williams	DB	Kansas City Chiefs	—
1998	5	8	131	Jonathan Linton	DB	Buffalo Bills	—
1999	1	20	20	Ebenezer Ekuban	DE	Dallas Cowboys	—
1999	2	10	41	Dré Bly^{‡}	DB	St. Louis Rams	Pro Bowl (2003, 2004); Super Bowl champion (XXXIV)
1999	2	17	48	Russell Davis^{†}	DT, DE	Chicago Bears	Super Bowl champion (XLII)
1999	4	24	119	Keith Newman	LB	Buffalo Bills	—
1999	4	35	130	Na Brown	WR	Philadelphia Eagles	—
1999	7	9	215	Mike Pringley	DE	Detroit Lions	—
2000	4	23	117	Deon Dyer	FB	Miami Dolphins	—
2001	2	4	35	Alge Crumpler*	TE	Atlanta Falcons	Pro Bowl (2003, 2004, 2005, 2006)
2001	3	8	70	Sedrick Hodge	LB	New Orleans Saints	—
2001	4	15	110	Brandon Spoon	LB	Buffalo Bills	—
2001	7	5	205	Dauntae' Finger	TE	Tampa Bay Buccaneers	—
2002	1	2	2	Julius Peppers*	DE	Carolina Panthers	Pro Bowl (2004, 2005, 2006, 2008, 2009, 2010, 2011, 2012, 2015)
2002	1	6	6	Ryan Sims	DT	Kansas City Chiefs	—
2002	4	8	106	David Thornton	LB	Indianapolis Colts	—
2002	7	8	219	Joey Evans	DE	Cincinnati Bengals	—
2002	7	24	235	Ronald Curry	WR	Oakland Raiders	—
2002	7	34	245	Quincy Monk	LB	New York Giants	—
2003	4	30	127	Sam Aiken	LB	Buffalo Bills	—
2004	4	17	113	Dexter Reid^{†}	DB	New England Patriots	Super Bowl champion (XXXIX, XLI)
2004	4	28	124	Michael Waddell	DB	Tennessee Titans	—
2004	5	14	146	Jeb Terry	G	Tampa Bay Buccaneers	—
2005	4	23	124	Jason Brown	C	Baltimore Ravens	—
2005	5	21	157	Gerald Sensabaugh	DB	Jacksonville Jaguars	—
2005	7	37	251	Madison Hedgecock^{†}	FB	St. Louis Rams	Super Bowl champion (XLII)
2006	7	17	225	Chase Page	DT	San Diego Chargers	—
2008	1	29	29	Kentwan Balmer	DT	San Francisco 49ers	—
2008	7	14	221	Hilee Taylor	LB	Carolina Panthers	—
2009	1	29	29	Hakeem Nicks	WR	New York Giants	Super Bowl champion (XLVI)
2009	2	32	64	Richard Quinn	TE	Denver Broncos	—
2009	3	14	83	Brandon Tate	WR	New England Patriots	—
2009	5	20	156	Garrett Reynolds	T	Atlanta Falcons	—
2009	5	24	160	Brooks Foster	WR	St. Louis Rams	—
2010	4	28	127	E. J. Wilson	DE	Seattle Seahawks	—
2010	5	15	146	Cam Thomas	DT	San Diego Chargers	—
2011	1	14	14	Robert Quinn*	DE	St. Louis Rams	Pro Bowl (2013, 2014)
2011	2	8	40	Bruce Carter	LB	Dallas Cowboys	—
2011	2	20	54	Marvin Austin^{†}	DT	New York Giants	Super Bowl champion (XLVI)
2011	2	27	57	Greg Little	WR	Cleveland Browns	—
2011	4	3	100	Da'Norris Searcy	DB	Buffalo Bills	—
2011	5	2	133	Johnny White	RB	Buffalo Bills	—
2011	5	21	152	T. J. Yates	QB	Houston Texans	—
2011	6	6	171	Quan Sturdivant	LB	Arizona Cardinals	—
2011	7	15	218	Ryan Taylor	TE	Arizona Cardinals	—
2012	1	16	16	Quinton Coples	DE	New York Jets	—
2012	2	20	56	Zach Brown	LB	Tennessee Titans	—
2013	1	7	7	Jonathan Cooper	G	Arizona Cardinals	—
2013	1	28	28	Sylvester Williams	DT	Denver Broncos	Super Bowl champion (50)
2013	2	5	37	Giovani Bernard	RB	Cincinnati Bengals	—
2013	3	27	89	Brennan Williams	T	Houston Texans	—
2013	7	8	214	Travis Bond	G	Minnesota Vikings	—
2014	1	10	10	Eric Ebron	TE	Detroit Lions	—
2014	3	20	84	Kareem Martin	DE	Arizona Cardinals	—
2014	4	11	111	Russell Bodine	C	Cincinnati Bengals	—
2014	4	28	128	Tre Boston	DB	Carolina Panthers	—
2014	7	10	223	Jabari Price	CB	Minnesota Vikings	—
2017	1	2	2	Mitchell Trubisky*	QB	Chicago Bears	Pro Bowl (2018)
2017	3	38	102	Nazair Jones	DT	Seattle Seahawks	—
2017	4	11	118	Mack Hollins	WR	Philadelphia Eagles	Super Bowl champion (LII)
2017	4	26	133	Ryan Switzer	WR	Dallas Cowboys	—
2017	5	35	179	T. J. Logan	RB	Arizona Cardinals	—
2017	7	24	242	Elijah Hood	RB	Oakland Raiders	—
2018	2	21	53	M. J. Stewart	CB	Tampa Bay Buccaneers	—
2018	7	16	234	Andre Smith	LB	Carolina Panthers	—
2018	7	37	255	Austin Proehl	WR	Buffalo Bills	—
2019	5	35	173	Cole Holcomb	LB	Washington Redskins	—
2020	4	20	126	Charlie Heck	T	Houston Texans	—
2020	5	8	154	Jason Strowbridge	DE	Miami Dolphins	—
2021	2	3	35	Javonte Williams	RB	Denver Broncos	—
2021	3	14	78	Chazz Surratt	LB	Minnesota Vikings	—
2021	3	18	82	Dyami Brown	WR	Washington Football Team	—
2021	4	2	107	Michael Carter	RB	New York Jets	—
2021	6	37	221	Dazz Newsome	WR	Chicago Bears	—
2022	3	3	67	Joshua Ezeudu	G	New York Giants	—
2022	5	1	144	Sam Howell	QB	Washington Commanders	—
2022	5	26	169	Ty Chandler	RB	Minnesota Vikings	—
2022	5	30	173	Marcus McKethan	G	New York Giants	—
2023	3	16	79	Josh Downs	WR	Indianapolis Colts	—
2023	5	34	169	Asim Richards	T	Dallas Cowboys	—
2023	7	2	219	Antoine Green	WR	Detroit Lions	—
2023	7	10	227	Raymond Vohasek	DT	Jacksonville Jaguars	—
2024	1	3	3	Drake Maye	QB	New England Patriots	—
2024	4	6	106	Cedric Gray	LB	Tennessee Titans	—
2024	4	13	113	Devontez Walker	WR	Baltimore Ravens	—
2025	1	22	22	Omarion Hampton	RB	Los Angeles Chargers	—

== Notable undrafted players ==
Note: No drafts held before 1920

Year	Player	Position	Debut Team	Notes
1954	Andy Miketa	C	Detroit Lions	—
1967	Frank Gallagher	G	Detroit Lions	—
1975	Jimmy DeRatt	DB	New Orleans Saints	—
1978	Alan Caldwell	DB	Los Angeles Rams	—
1981	Paul Davis	LB	Oakland Raiders	—
1982	Jeff Hayes	P	Washington Redskins	—
1982	Shelton Robinson	LB	Seattle Seahawks	—
1984	Scott Stankavage	QB	Denver Broncos	—
1986	Tim Morrison	DB	Washington Redskins	—
1987	Ron Burton	LB	Dallas Cowboys	—
1994	Ethan Albright	LS	Miami Dolphins	—
1994	Bernardo Harris	LB	Kansas City Chiefs	—
1994	Corey Holliday	WR	Pittsburgh Steelers	—
1995	Greg DeLong	TE	Minnesota Vikings	—
1998	Nate Hobgood-Chittick	DT	New York Giants	—
1998	Jeff Saturday	C	Baltimore Ravens	—
2002	Jeff Reed	K	New Orleans Saints	—
2005	Darian Durant	QB	Baltimore Ravens	—
2007	Larry Edwards	LB	Buffalo Bills	—
2014	Bryn Renner	QB	Denver Broncos	—
2016	Quinshad Davis	WR	Detroit Lions	—
2016	Marquise Williams	QB	Green Bay Packers	—
2019	Anthony Ratliff-Williams	WR	Tennessee Titans	—
2024	British Brooks	RB	Houston Texans	—
2024	Amari Gainer	LB	Las Vegas Raiders	—
2025	Power Echols	LB	Chicago Bears	—
2025	Alijah Huzzie	DB	Houston Texans	—
2025	Willie Lampkin	OL	Los Angeles Rams	—
2025	Nate McCollum	WR	New York Giants	—
2025	Bryson Nesbit	TE	Minnesota Vikings	—
2025	Jahvaree Ritzie	DL	New England Patriots	—
2025	Kaimon Rucker	LB	Baltimore Ravens	—
2026	Marcus Allen	CB	Minnesota Vikings	—
2026	Austin Blaske	OL	Los Angeles Rams	—
2026	Thaddeus Dixon	CB	New York Giants	—
2026	Chad Lindberg	OL	Los Angeles Rams	—
2026	Smith Vilbert	DE	Minnesota Vikings	—
