= Scotland Manufacturing =

Scotland Manufacturing, Inc.
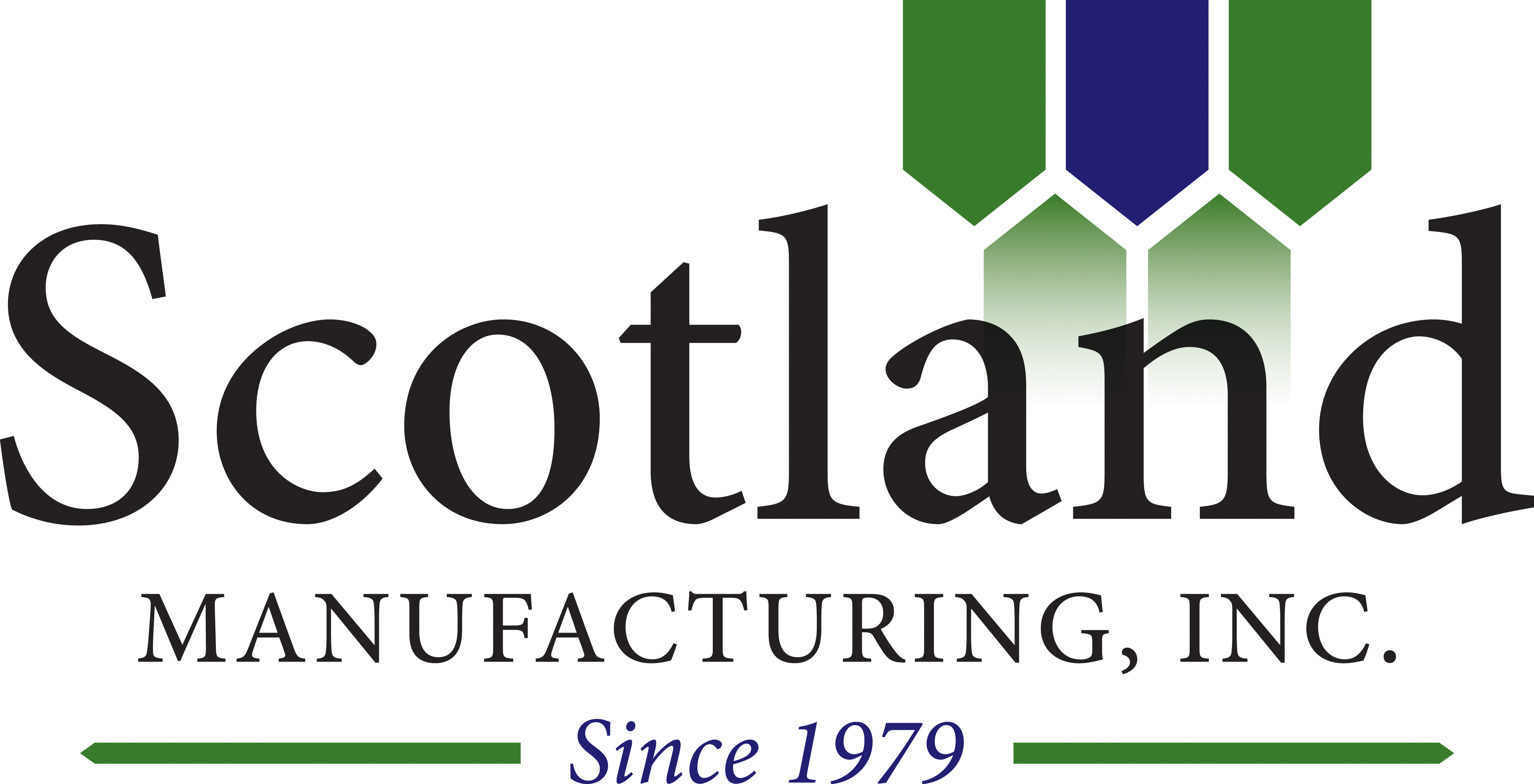
- Industry: Filtration, automotive, construction, rail and aerospace
- Founded: 1979
- Headquarters: Laurinburg, North Carolina, US
- Key people: Wayne Cain, General Manager; Dennis Cich, Engineering Manager
- Products: Deep drawn shells and stampings
- Services: ==Deep-drawn stampings: aerospace stampings, heavy-duty industrial filtration; flat stampings: automotive stampings, construction stampings, rail stampings==
- Website: Scotland Manufacturing

Scotland Manufacturing, Inc. is a full-service stamping company and manufacturer of deep drawn metal stampings, progressive stamping (die manufacturing) and value-added assembly solutions. Scotland has presses running from 110 to 1,000 tons and the company provides refrigerant, compressor housing, filter shells and other deep-drawn stampings from the industrial, automotive and heavy truck industries.

Scotland Manufacturing is ISO 9001 certified and produces stampings from a variety of metals including cold rolled steel, electro tin plate and stainless steel. Their facility has more than 50,000 square feet (4,600 m^{2}) of manufacturing space.

== History ==
Scotland Manufacturing, located in Laurinburg, North Carolina, was founded in 1979 as a supplier to the filter industry. Named for Scotland County located in Southeastern North Carolina, the company is situated between Charlotte, the state’s largest city and Wilmington, the state’s largest port. From an $8-million business in 2001, Scotland Manufacturing has grown to a $20-million business in 2009.

Scotland Manufacturing is part of The Reserve Group (TRG), a private equity group based in Akron, Ohio. The Reserve Group’s philosophy is to provide strategic business support and investment capital, allowing its portfolio of companies to remain competitive in the marketplace. Scotland Manufacturing is the oldest member company in the TRG portfolio.

== Products ==
For the automotive industry, Scotland Manufacturing creates door panels for the high-end automotive OEM, clutch plates, transmission plates, brackets and filter cans. Additionally, the company uses a variety of metals, from flat steel to stainless steel, to produce components for the construction industry such as chimney caps, and brackets and braces for pre-fabricated buildings. Scotland also creates railway brake intercasings, rail shoes, rail pads and rail friction products as well as fire extinguishers and other components for the aerospace industry.

Scotland Manufacturing offers shell supply in either low cost cold rolled steel or stronger, more corrosion-resistant tin plate steel. Deep drawn stampings are manufactured in diameters from 2 5/8 inches to 5 inches wide and up to 12 inches tall. The company’s production capacity offers low, medium and high volume capabilities on presses ranging from 110 to 1,000 tons. Stampings are manufactured in steel, stainless steel, pre-coated steel and aluminum.

Scotland Manufacturing products are used to create filters, Mack trucks, John Deere Tractors, Dodge pick-up trucks, chimney caps, fire extinguishers, railroad car brakes, end caps and retainer plates. The production facility offers welding, assembly, and pressure testing.

== Associations ==
Scotland Manufacturing is a member of the following associations: Filter Manufacturers Council and American Filtration & Separations Society.

In addition, Scotland Manufacturing has partnered with Richmond Community College of Hamlet, North Carolina for an Industrial Training Program.
