= Perry Williams =

Perry Williams may refer to:

- Perry Williams (cornerback), American football cornerback
- Perry Williams (running back), American football running back
