= Dante Miller =

American football player (born 1999)

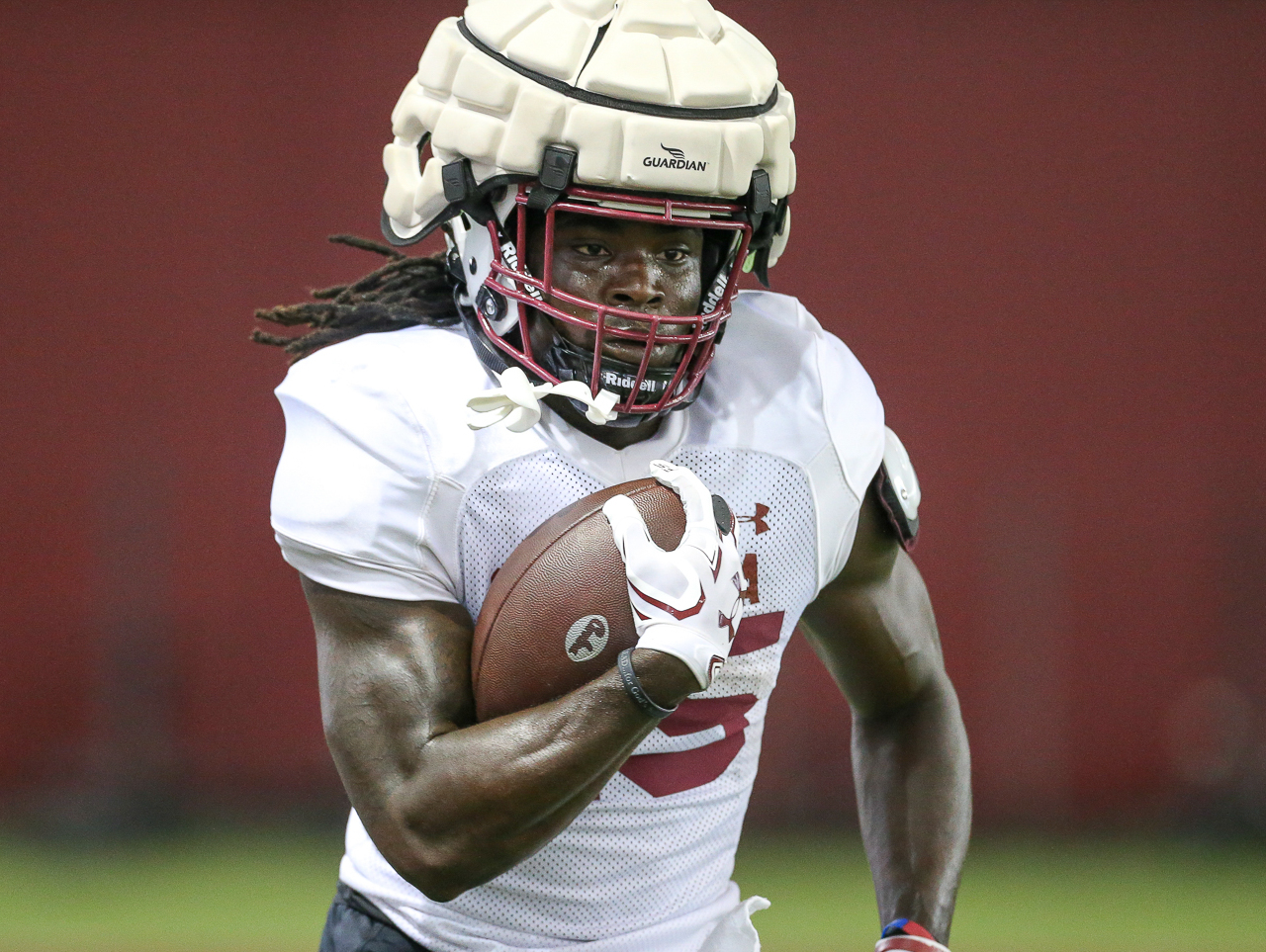
- Miller with the South Carolina Gamecocks in 2022

DC Defenders
- Position: Running back
- Roster status: Unsigned draft pick

Personal information
- Born: May 14, 1999 (age 27); Rockingham, North Carolina, U.S.
- Listed height: 5 ft 9 in (1.75 m)
- Listed weight: 200 lb (91 kg)

Career information
- High school: Richmond (Rockingham)
- College: Columbia (2018–2021); South Carolina (2022)
- NFL draft: 2023: undrafted

Career history
- New York Giants (2024–2025); DC Defenders (2027-present)

Awards and highlights
- First Team All-Ivy League (2021)

Career NFL statistics as of 2025
- Games played: 2
- Stats at Pro Football Reference

Dante Davon Miller (born May 14, 1999) is an American professional football running back. He previously played for the New York Giants of the National Football League (NFL). He played college football for the Columbia Lions and South Carolina Gamecocks.

== Early life ==
Miller played four years of varsity football for Richmond Senior High while also competing in basketball, swimming, and track and field. During that time he saw action at running back, wide receiver and defensive back, was a two-time all-conference selection, and was named team captain as a senior. In December 2017, Miller committed to play college football at James Madison over offers from Gardner-Webb, Wofford, Navy, and several other Division I schools. On January 12, 2018, he flipped his commitment to Columbia and signed his letter of intent on February 7, 2018.

== College career ==
=== Columbia ===
During his career at Columbia, Miller rushed for 1,281 yards on 258 carries with six touchdowns. He had a career-long run of 83 yards, which was the sixth-longest rush in school history.

In 2021, Miller earned First Team All-Ivy League honors and was named team MVP.

Due to Ivy League eligibility rules, Miller was forced to transfer if he wished to continue playing. On January 28, 2022, he announced that he was transferring to South Carolina.

=== South Carolina ===
Miller entered as a preferred walk-on graduate transfer and appeared in each of the first six games of the season. Once concerns over his eligibility arose, he stopped playing for the remainder of the 2022 season in hopes of appealing for an additional year of eligibility. Despite his college and draft eligibility issues, he would participate in the Gamecocks' 2023 Pro Day.

=== Eligibility issues ===
After his transfer to South Carolina, a miscommunication occurred that led Miller and the South Carolina staff to believe that Miller had two years of eligibility left to play. In actuality, he had two years to play one season, not two full years of eligibility. In 2022, he played six games for the Gamecocks, two more than the maximum four to redshirt a season. After realizing the mistake, South Carolina appealed to the NCAA and Miller stopped playing in 2022, hoping he would be granted an extra year of eligibility in 2023. The process continued into 2023 and Miller began to participate in spring practice with the Gamecocks. Eventually, after spring practice had ended and the deadline to declare for the NFL draft had passed, the NCAA ruled Miller to be ineligible to play in 2023. Because of Miller's eligibility issues, he was also not eligible for the 2024 NFL draft and instead should have been in the 2023 NFL draft, leading to him becoming a free agent.

=== College statistics ===
Legend
**Bold**	Career high

Year	Team	Games		Rushing				Receiving			
Year	Team	GP	GS	Att	Yds	Avg	TD	Rec	Yds	Avg	TD
2018	Columbia	6	1	61	317	5.2	1	5	22	4.4	0
2019	Columbia	**10**	2	52	150	2.9	1	6	8	1.3	0
2020	Columbia	Season canceled due to COVID-19 pandemic									
2021	Columbia	**10**	**4**	**145**	**814**	**5.6**	**4**	**9**	**43**	**4.8**	0
2022	South Carolina	6	0	6	38	6.3	0	0	0	0.0	0
Career		32	7	264	1,319	5.0	6	20	73	3.7	0

== Professional career ==
Pre-draft measurables
Height	Weight	Arm length	Hand span	Wingspan	40-yard dash	10-yard split	20-yard split	20-yard shuttle	Three-cone drill	Vertical jump	Broad jump	Bench press
5 ft 8 3/4 in (1.75 m)	190 lb (86 kg)	31 1/4 in (0.79 m)	8 3/4 in (0.22 m)	6 ft 3 1/2 in (1.92 m)	4.27 s	1.50 s	2.56 s	4.50 s	7.41 s	37.5 in (0.95 m)	10 ft 9 in (3.28 m)	28 reps
All values from Pro Day

On April 5, 2024, as a free agent, Miller signed with the New York Giants. He was waived on August 27 and re-signed to the practice squad the following day. He was promoted to the active roster on January 4, 2025.

On August 26, 2025, Miller was waived by the Giants as part of final roster cuts and re-signed to the practice squad the next day. He was promoted to the active roster on January 3, 2026. Miller was inactive for the final two games for the season.

On August 17, 2026, Miller was waived by the Giants with an injury designation.

== Personal life ==
Miller was placed in the foster care system at the age of 2 after his mother left him with a neighbor and did not return. He was eventually removed from the system by his mother's first cousin, Antoinette Flowers, at age 8. He has two siblings: Choyce and Trey. His sister, Choyce, is a producer for the Huffington Post.

Miller's nickname is Lil Turbo in reference to his smaller frame.

Miller graduated from Columbia with a degree in sociology.
