= Doug Thomas (American football) =

American football player (1969–2014)

No. 85
- Position: Wide receiver

Personal information
- Born: September 18, 1969; Rockingham, North Carolina, U.S.
- Died: December 19, 2014 (aged 45); Charlotte, North Carolina, U.S.
- Listed height: 5 ft 10 in (1.78 m)
- Listed weight: 178 lb (81 kg)

Career information
- High school: Richmond (NC)
- College: Clemson
- NFL draft: 1991: 2nd round, 51st overall pick

Career history
- Seattle Seahawks (1991–1993)

Career NFL statistics
- Receptions: 22
- Receiving yards: 207
- Rushing yards: 11
- Stats at Pro Football Reference

Douglas Savoy Thomas (September 18, 1969 – December 19, 2014) was an American professional football player who was a wide receiver in the National Football League (NFL) who played for the Seattle Seahawks. He was selected by the Seahawks in the second round of the 1991 NFL draft. He played college football for the Clemson Tigers.

Thomas also competed on the Clemson Tigers track and field team as a sprinter, leading off their runner-up 4 × 100 m relay at the 1991 NCAA Division I Outdoor Track and Field Championships.

Thomas died on December 19, 2014, at the age of 45.
