= Kathy Ormsby =

American long-distance runner (1964–2026)

- Ormsby pictured before the 1986 NCAA Division I Outdoor Track and Field Championships

Personal information
- Born: November 1, 1964
- Died: January 20, 2026 (aged 61)
- Height: 5 ft 5 in (165 cm)
- Weight: 103 lb (47 kg)

Sport
- Country: United States
- Sport: Athletics
- Events: 5000 meters 10,000 meters

Achievements and titles
- Personal bests: 3000 m: 9:23.95 (1986); 5000 m: 16:04.8 (1984); 5K run: 16:09 (1985-86); 10,000 m: 32:36.2 CR (1986); 4 × 1500 m relay: 18:11.34 CR (1986)

Kathryn Love Ormsby (November 1, 1964 – January 20, 2026) was an American long-distance runner and occupational therapist. She is most known for setting the collegiate record over 10,000 meters in 1986 and for jumping off a bridge and becoming permanently paralyzed during the 1986 NCAA Division I Outdoor Track and Field Championships race over that distance months later.

After beginning running as a high school sophomore, Ormsby was a six-time North Carolina High School Athletic Association outdoor track champion and one-time cross country state champion, setting a state record in the 1600 meters. She committed to the NC State Wolfpack track and field team, where she was a 5000 meters All-American as a freshman in 1984.

In 1986, Ormsby set all-time collegiate records in the 4 × 1500 m relay and the 10,000 meters, the latter done in her debut over the distance to win the Penn Relays. She was considered a sentimental favorite to win the 10,000 m at the 1986 NCAA Division I Outdoor Track and Field Championships.

During the race, Ormsby ran off the track and climbed a seven-foot fence to reach the nearby New York Street Bridge, where she jumped off the railing. Her coach found her minutes later and she became permanently paralyzed from the waist down due to the fall. The reason for the fall was not fully understood, but it was often used as an example of the consequences of extreme pressure in sports, although anorexia nervosa was also proposed as an explanation. Ormsby recovered, returned to North Carolina State University, and became a hand therapist later in life.

== Career ==
=== Prep ===
Ormsby first competed in sprints in junior high school. Because Richmond Senior High School in Richmond County, North Carolina didn't initially have a women's cross country team, she competed in volleyball her freshman year.

Ormsby began competing in high school track and field her sophomore year. During her sophomore year at the 1981 North Carolina High School Athletic Association (NCHSAA) state championships, Ormsby won the 1600 m in 5:09.1, was runner-up in the 800 m, and anchored her team's winning 4 × 400 m relay. She ended her season at the 1981 AAU Junior Olympic Games, winning the young women's 1500 m and 800 m representing the Raleigh Junior Striders.

In September 1981, Ormsby broke the McAlpine Creek Park cross country course record over 5 km. Running her first ever cross country season, she was considered a favorite for the 1981 North Carolina state cross country title. Ormsby finished 2nd to Karen Dunn, having been passed after 4,000 meters. After the race, it was revealed that she had run with a fractured ankle.

Outdoors in 1982, Ormsby won the 3200 meters and 4 × 800 m relay at the Queen City Relays. During the 1982 NCHSAA championships, Ormsby set a state record 4:58.94 to win the 1600 meters. She was also runner-up in the 800 m and fifth in the 3,200 m. Ormsby ran for the Greensboro Pacesetters Track Club during the post-season. She was an honorable mention All-American for 1982.

Ormsby was again considered a favorite for the 1982 NCHSAA cross country title. After winning her sectional, she won the state championship and set a meet record of 18:09.6 for 5 km. Ormsby qualified for the Kinney Cross Country Championships by placing 5th in the southern regional and was 23rd at the national meet.

During her senior track season, Ormsby won the 800 m, 1600 m, and 3200 m at her final NCHSAA championship. Her 1600 m and 3200 m times of 4:56.8 and 11:08.4 were state records. She was the only three-time winner at the meet, and she also ran on a 4th-place 4 × 400 m team.

=== NC State ===
==== 1983-84 season ====
Ormsby was expected to fill a void of distance runners on the NC State team. She made the NC State Wolfpack cross country team's top five during two meets in September of 1983 as a freshman. She was 15th at the 1983 Atlantic Coast Conference (ACC) cross country championships. At the 1983 NCAA Division I Cross Country Championships, Ormsby blacked out one mile into the race and did not finish.

Ormsby won the 3000 m at the 1984 Atlantic Coast Relays in Raleigh. She was 3rd in that event at the ACC track and field championships. She qualified for the 5000 m finals at the 1984 NCAA Division I Outdoor Track and Field Championships, placing 7th with a 16:19.79 time. She was the 4th American finisher and earned All-American honors.

==== 1984-85 ====
Ormsby was 6th at the 1984 ACC Cross Country Championships, finishing as the 3rd NC State runner. She was 12th at the NCAA District III championships, qualifying with her team to the 1984 NCAA Division I Cross Country Championships. She was 54th at the national championships as the NC State women's team placed 3rd.

At the 1985 ACC track and field championships, Ormsby was 4th in the 5000 m and runner-up in the 3000 m. Ormsby ran a 5000 m best time of 16:04.8 to finish 4th at the 1984 Penn Relays.

Ormsby was entered in the 3000 m and 5000 m at the 1985 NCAA Division I Outdoor Track and Field Championships. She qualified for the 5000 m finals with a 16:10 run in her heat, and finished 10th in the finals in 16:10.21.

==== 1985-86 ====
On the roads during the 1985-86 season, Ormsby set a single-age world record in the road 5K run, running 16:09 as the fastest time by a 21-year-old.

Ormsby was runner-up in the 1985 North Carolina Collegiate State Cross Country Championships, losing by one tenth of a second. She was 4th at the 1985 ACC Cross Country Championships.

Going into the NCAA regional meet, Ormsby's NC State team was tied for a first-place national ranking. She was 4th in the District III meet and was selected to race at the 1985 NCAA Division I Cross Country Championships. At the championships, she passed out and was one of four athletes not to finish. Her North Carolina State team finished 3rd.

Ormsby was runner-up in the 800 m and 1500 m at the 1986 Wolfpack Invitational. She led off the NC State 4 × 1500 meters relay team at the Atlantic Coast Relays, winning and setting a new collegiate record time of 18:11.34. In addition, she set a collegiate leader of 9:23.95 in the 3000 meters at the same meet. The following month, she anchored the winning distance medley relay team at the Carolina-Duke Carnival.

Ormsby was runner-up in the 5000 m at the 1986 ACC Championships, running 16:11.06 to qualify for the national meet. She was also 4th in the 3000 m.

Ormsby debuted in the track 10,000 meters at the 1986 Penn Relays. She won the race in what was described as a "surprising performance" in 32:36.2, besting Katie Ishmael's 32:37.37 collegiate record from 1984. She didn't make a winning move past Duke's Ellen Reynolds in the race until just over one lap remained, though she said she felt strong during the race from being near the lead throughout. The mark also made her the sixth-fastest American of all time. She was named the female collegiate athlete of the meet for her performance.

Ormsby was then runner-up at the Virginia Track Classic 3000 m on May 10. On May 17, Ormsby attempted to break 16 minutes in the 5000 m at a home meet, but she passed out after about two miles. She told her coach and father that she had tripped rather than passing out.

== 1986 NCAA Outdoor Championships ==
=== Race ===
Following her collegiate record, Ormsby was considered a "sentimental favorite" in the 10,000 m at the 1986 NCAA Division I Outdoor Track and Field Championships, to be held at Carroll Stadium, Indianapolis. Although Ormsby was the collegiate record-holder, other women in the field had run faster in mixed-gender meets not eligible for records.

During the race on June 4, 1986, Ormsby initially ran with the lead pack. Ormsby was still considered to be in strong contention 6500 m into the race, just behind the top three runners. She nonetheless dropped out at that point, allowing Stephanie Herbst of Wisconsin to win and break her record. She also did not start the 5000 m later in the meet that she had qualified for, causing the NCAA to cancel the heats and run a straight final in that event.

Details about Ormsby's withdrawal were first reported on June 6. She jogged about two blocks away from the stadium to New York Street Bridge, which crosses the White River. To reach the bridge, she had to climb over a 7-foot (2.1 m) fence. She jumped off the bridge, falling approximately 40–50 feet (12–15 m) to a floodplain grassy area about 20 feet (6.1 m) from the water. She was found by her NC State coach Rollie Geiger minutes later and was transferred to Wishard Memorial Hospital, where she was declared to be in serious condition with spinal and chest injuries.

On June 7, Ormsby was reported to be permanently paralyzed from the waist down. Her supervising physician said, "we would just be misleading her if we gave any possibility at all of regaining the use of her legs. This is as absolutely permanent as we can determine". The NCAA and meet officials limited information about the accident in part to prevent negative publicity for the organization.

Ormsby underwent surgery and first visited her parents' home in a wheelchair on July 20, with an expected release in August 1986. In a December 1986 interview, Ormsby revealed that she had panic attacks in three previous races before the 1986 NCAA outdoor championships. She received more than 1,200 letters in response to the jump, about 300 of which were sent from Indiana. She received a proposal to create a television movie of her life, which Ormsby declined.

=== Reason ===
The reason for Ormsby's leap was considered to be a mystery. Originally classified as a suicide attempt, IUPUI police lieutenant Doug Cox initially stated, "The speculation is that she is a real perfectionist and didn't think she had done very well. She felt despondent because of the way she was running". Other media reported that she jumped because she was upset from losing the race. Her first comment to her parents was that she wasn't exactly sure what happened, with her physician saying that it was likely she suffered from amnesia. However, in December she stated that she definitely did not jump because she felt she was going to lose the race. Ex-NC State coach Tom Jones said Ormsby had been seeing a sports psychologist to deal with the pressure of holding the collegiate record.

A friend of Ormsby said that she was affected by "repeated bad performance" at the NCAA championships, citing instances of cramps or accidental falling at previous meets that created a mental block. Race winner Stephanie Herbst speculated that athletic and academic pressures could have caused the jump, while North Carolina running icon Jim Beatty stated that the extreme pressures Ormsby subjected herself to were relatable.

The problem of pressure put on female track and field athletes was found to be more widespread than previously thought. Mary Wazeter, a Georgetown Hoyas track and field athlete, was also a high school track state champion and had jumped off a bridge after dropping out of Georgetown in 1982. Wazeter suffered from anorexia nervosa and was hospitalized for a drug overdose before her jump. A psychologist later said he learned several women in the 1986 NCAA 10,000 m final were also troubled. Ormsby's coach said that she did not have anorexia, however the North Carolina track and field program was known to have conducted daily weight checks for runners on the team and Ormsby was observed to be "much thinner" before her jump. Following Ormsby's failure to finish at the 1985 NCAA cross country championships, Ormsby's parents felt she was not getting proper nutrients as she had to rely on iron supplements.

The news media was also blamed for Ormsby's jump. Some writers noted that sportswriters did not sufficiently criticize Vince Lombardi or George Allen because they were winning, even though their underlying 'win-at-all-costs' attitude was destructive. Epilepsy was also proposed as a reason for the jump, given that teammates said Ormsby was sometimes "out of it" following her races.

By 1996, Ormsby had rethought the events and said the jump was a result of "the unhappy confluence of physical, mental, emotional and spiritual factors with stress, pressure, heat, fatigue, delicate chemical balances altered by extremes of exertion and a misguided sense of personal responsibility".

== Personal life ==
Ormsby was born on November 1, 1964 to parents Dale Ormsby (born c. 1928) and Sallie Ormsby (born c. 1937). She grew up in Rockingham, Richmond County, North Carolina. Her father was the manager of a Burlington Industries textile mill in Cordova, while her mother was a nurse at Richmond Memorial Hospital. She had two brothers Dale Jr. and John, and a sister, Donna Freshwater. In her early life she was involved with her church as a youth co-pastor and a choir singer, and worked as a candy striper hospital volunteer.

She attended Richmond Senior High School in Rockingham, where she was ranked first in her class of 600 academically. In high school, she participated in the National Honor Society, student government, and Latin club. Due to her accomplishments, she was honored by Richmond Senior HS with her own day, Kathryn Ormsby Day, on May 26, 1983, and she was the first school athlete to have her jersey retired. Following her jump, the 1986 Great Tavern Tour 5K run was dedicated to Ormsby, the record-holder at the event.

She signed a grant-in-aid to attend North Carolina State University beginning in fall 1983. While at NC State, Ormsby majored in zoology and was described as soft-spoken. Ormsby was a baptist and a close friend described her as deeply religious, participating in bible study at the Campus Crusade for Christ. She was also a pre-med major and dean's list student. She wanted to become a medical missionary.

Following her jump, Ormsby attended St. Andrews University in October 1986, known for its disability accommodations. She returned to NC State in January 1987, where she completed her degree and later earned a graduate degree in occupational therapy from the University of North Carolina at Chapel Hill. She was interested in becoming a minister, but later became a therapist at New Hanover Regional Medical Center in Wilmington, North Carolina, in the 1990s. She focused on hand therapy and last worked at EmergeOrtho.

In 2013, Ormsby was honored by North Carolina High School Athletic Association as one of the "100 To Remember: Female Athletes" to celebrate the 100th anniversary of the organization. In 2023, she was inducted into the inaugural Richmond High School Athletics Hall of Fame. In her acceptance speech, Orsmby said that while sports are important, they are not everything.

Ormsby died on January 20, 2026, aged 61. She was honored posthumously at the February School Board meeting at Rockingham Middle School.
