= Dannell Ellerbe =

American football player (born 1985)

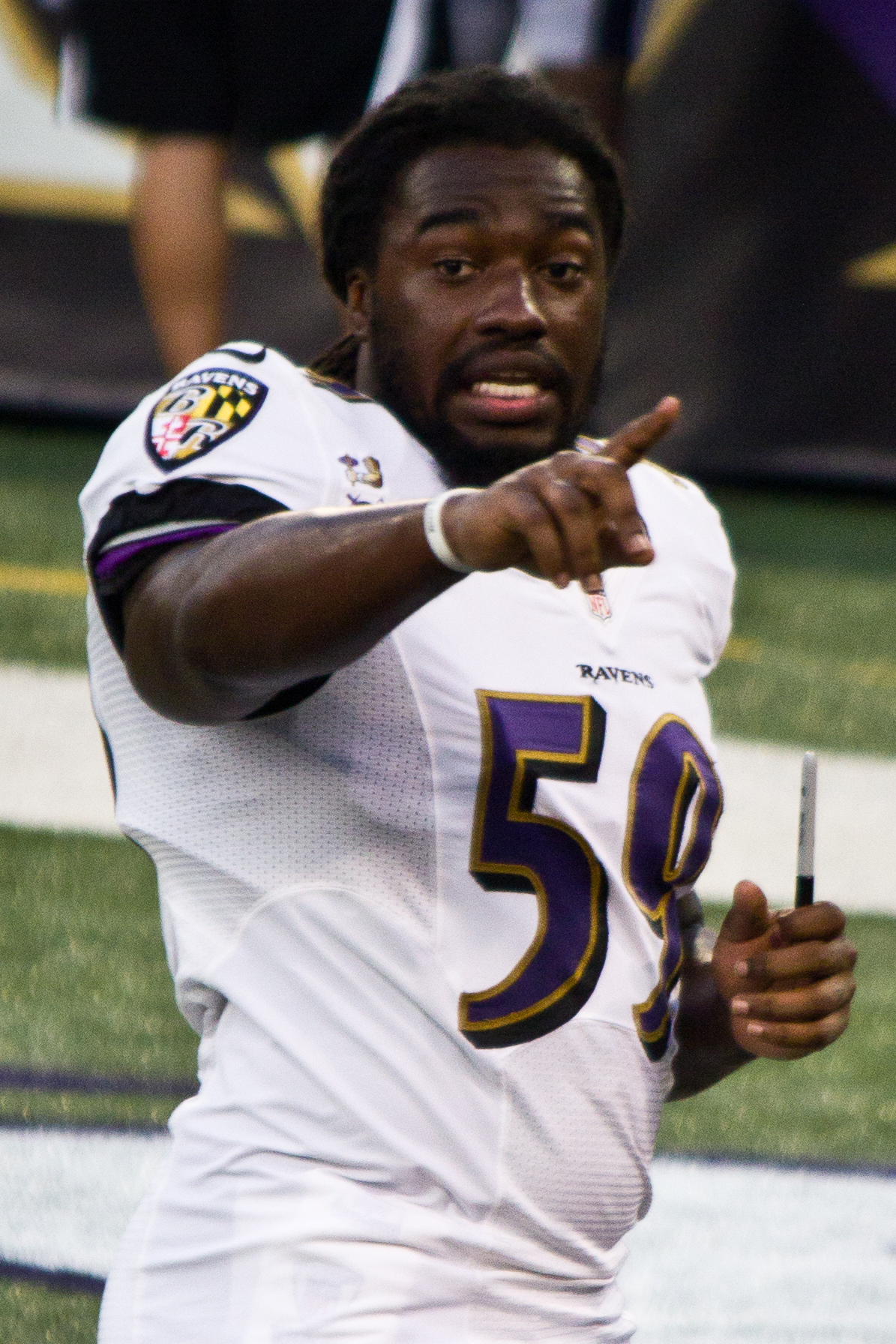
- Ellerbe with the Baltimore Ravens in 2012

No. 57, 59
- Position: Linebacker

Personal information
- Born: November 29, 1985 (age 40); Hamlet, North Carolina, U.S.
- Listed height: 6 ft 1 in (1.85 m)
- Listed weight: 245 lb (111 kg)

Career information
- High school: Richmond Senior (Rockingham, North Carolina)
- College: Georgia (2004–2008)
- NFL draft: 2009: undrafted

Career history
- Baltimore Ravens (2009–2012); Miami Dolphins (2013–2014); New Orleans Saints (2015–2016); Philadelphia Eagles (2017)

Awards and highlights
- 2× Super Bowl champion (XLVII, LII); Second-team All-SEC (2007)

Career NFL statistics
- Total tackles: 376
- Sacks: 10.5
- Forced fumbles: 2
- Fumble recoveries: 4
- Interceptions: 3
- Stats at Pro Football Reference

Dannell Antonio Ellerbe (born November 29, 1985) is an American former professional football player who was a linebacker in the National Football League (NFL). He played college football for the Georgia Bulldogs and was signed by the Baltimore Ravens as an undrafted free agent in 2009. He also played for the Miami Dolphins, New Orleans Saints and Philadelphia Eagles.

== Early life ==
Ellerbe attended Richmond Senior High School in Rockingham, North Carolina, where he was a two-sport star in football and track. He was named All-State by the Associated Press. He was named the Defensive MVP of the 2003 Shrine Bowl (NC-SC All-Star Game), in which he had nine tackles, three pass break-ups, and one interception. He made 124 tackles and five sacks as a junior and 165 tackles and nine sacks as a senior. Regarded as a four-star recruit by Rivals.com, Ellerbe was listed as the No. 7 outside linebacker nationally.

In track, he recorded a 1.98-meter (6 ft, 6 in) high jump as a junior. He also ran a 4.4-second 40-yard dash, bench-pressed 280 pounds, squatted 480 and had a 42-inch vertical jump.

Ellerbe was inducted into the Raider Athletic Hall of Fame in 2025.

== College career ==
Ellerbe went to the University of Georgia for five years. He played for four seasons after a redshirt freshman year. During his Georgia career, he played in 43 games, totaling 148 tackles, 8.5 sacks, three interceptions, two recovered fumbles, and one forced fumble.

=== Awards ===
He earned 2nd-team All-SEC honors by the Associated Press, Southeastern Conference coaches and Rivals.com as a junior. Ellerbe accepted an invitation to play in 2009 East-West Shrine game after his senior season.

== Professional career ==
Pre-draft measurables
| Height | Weight | Arm length | Hand span | 20-yard shuttle | Three-cone drill | Vertical jump | Broad jump |
|---|---|---|---|---|---|---|---|
| 6 ft 1 in (1.85 m) | 236 lb (107 kg) | 32 1/2 in (0.83 m) | 9 3/8 in (0.24 m) | 4.23 s | 7.00 s | 35.0 in (0.89 m) | 9 ft 10 in (3.00 m) |
All values from NFL Combine

=== Baltimore Ravens ===
Ellerbe was signed as an undrafted free agent during the 2009 season by the Baltimore Ravens. He had a large role that year for the Ravens. While starting three games, he recorded 41 tackles and an interception which he returned 28 yards in a Week 17 win against the Oakland Raiders.

In a 2010 preseason win against the St. Louis Rams, Ellerbe returned an interception 45 yards for a touchdown but was yelled at on the sidelines by head coach John Harbaugh for showboating. Ellerbe had held the ball in front of him twice during the return. Ellerbe made the roster as a backup linebacker behind Jameel McClain, who also was signed by Baltimore as an undrafted free agent. Dannell Ellerbe's tackles dropped to 31, but he recorded his first career sack.

In 2011, Ellerbe played in nine games, starting three in Ray Lewis's absence due to injury. He recorded 19 tackles.

Going into the 2012 season as a restricted free agent, Ellerbe was re-signed to a one-year, $1.927 million contract.

On November 9, 2012, Ellerbe was fined $10,000 for his hit on Cleveland Browns running back Trent Richardson in Week 9.

On January 20, 2013, in the AFC Championship game against the New England Patriots, Ellerbe intercepted a pass from Tom Brady that had been tipped by Pernell McPhee in the 4th quarter with 6:49 remaining in the game. This was one of the three turnovers by the Patriots that allowed the Ravens to win 28–13 and advance to Super Bowl XLVII, where they would defeat the San Francisco 49ers 34–31.

=== Miami Dolphins ===
Ellerbe signed with the Miami Dolphins on March 12, 2013. In his first season with the Dolphins, he finished the year with 101 total tackles, two interceptions, and one sack. The 2014 season was a wash for Ellerbe as he was on injured reserve for the majority of the season.

=== New Orleans Saints ===
On March 13, 2015, Ellerbe was traded along with a third round pick to the New Orleans Saints in exchange for wide receiver Kenny Stills. Ellerbe was injured most of the year, but recorded 13 tackles and forced a fumble in a Week 5 game against the Atlanta Falcons. In 2016 he played in nine games and was credited with four sacks.

On July 25, 2017, Ellerbe was placed on injured reserve after suffering a foot injury. He was released by New Orleans on August 25.

=== Philadelphia Eagles ===
On November 12, 2017, Ellerbe signed with the Philadelphia Eagles, reuniting him with former teammates Corey Graham and Torrey Smith. Ellerbe won his second Super Bowl ring when the Eagles defeated the New England Patriots 41–33 in Super Bowl LII.

=== NFL statistics ===
| Year | Team | GP | COMB | TOTAL | AST | SACK | FF | FR | FR YDS | INT | IR YDS | AVG IR | LNG | TD | PD |
|---|---|---|---|---|---|---|---|---|---|---|---|---|---|---|---|
| 2009 | BAL | 13 | 41 | 34 | 7 | 0.0 | 0 | 1 | 0 | 1 | 28 | 28 | 28 | 0 | 1 |
| 2010 | BAL | 11 | 31 | 25 | 6 | 1.0 | 0 | 0 | 0 | 0 | 0 | 0 | 0 | 0 | 1 |
| 2011 | BAL | 9 | 18 | 14 | 4 | 0.0 | 0 | 0 | 0 | 0 | 0 | 0 | 0 | 0 | 0 |
| 2012 | BAL | 13 | 92 | 69 | 23 | 4.5 | 1 | 0 | 0 | 0 | 0 | 0 | 0 | 0 | 2 |
| 2013 | MIA | 15 | 101 | 70 | 31 | 1.0 | 0 | 2 | 0 | 2 | 25 | 13 | 16 | 0 | 5 |
| 2014 | MIA | 1 | 2 | 2 | 0 | 0.0 | 0 | 0 | 0 | 0 | 0 | 0 | 0 | 0 | 0 |
| 2015 | NO | 6 | 39 | 34 | 5 | 0.0 | 1 | 1 | 0 | 0 | 0 | 0 | 0 | 0 | 1 |
| 2016 | NO | 9 | 44 | 34 | 10 | 4.0 | 0 | 0 | 0 | 0 | 0 | 0 | 0 | 0 | 2 |
| 2017 | PHI | 3 | 8 | 6 | 2 | 0.0 | 0 | 0 | 0 | 0 | 0 | 0 | 0 | 0 | 0 |
| Career | | 80 | 376 | 288 | 86 | 10.5 | 2 | 4 | 0 | 3 | 53 | 18 | 28 | 0 | 12 |
