= Oscar Sturgis =

American football player (born 1971)

No. 90, 97
- Position: Defensive end

Personal information
- Born: January 12, 1971 (age 55); Hamlet, North Carolina, U.S.
- Listed height: 6 ft 5 in (1.96 m)
- Listed weight: 278 lb (126 kg)

Career information
- High school: Richmond (Rockingham, North Carolina)
- College: North Carolina
- NFL draft: 1995: 7th round, 236th overall pick

Career history
- Dallas Cowboys (1995); Green Bay Packers (1996); Miami Dolphins (1996); → Frankfurt Galaxy (1997); Carolina Panthers (1998)*; Montreal Alouettes (1998)*; Arizona Rattlers (1998–2001); Georgia Force (2002–2003); Los Angeles Avengers (2003); Georgia Force (2004)
- * Offseason or practice squad member only

Awards and highlights
- Super Bowl champion (XXX)

Career NFL statistics
- Games played: 1
- Stats at Pro Football Reference

Career AFL statistics
- Tackles: 38
- Sacks: 3
- Passes defended: 26
- Forced fumbles: 2
- Interceptions: 1
- Stats at ArenaFan.com

Oscar Lee Sturgis (born January 12, 1971) is an American former professional football player who was a defensive end in the National Football League (NFL) for the Dallas Cowboys, Green Bay Packers and Miami Dolphins. He played college football for the North Carolina Tar Heels.

== Early life ==
Sturgis attended Richmond Senior High School in Rockingham, North Carolina, where he helped his team win a pair of Class 4-A state titles in 1988 and 1989, with a perfect 30-0 record over those two years. As a junior, he tallied 32 receptions for 673 yards and 6 touchdowns at tight end.

As a senior, he was Super Prep All-America and an All-state selection, after making 32 receptions for 776 yards and 11 touchdowns.

== College career ==
Sturgis accepted a football scholarship to play at the University of North Carolina at Chapel Hill in 1990, but was ruled academically ineligible. Rather than enrolling as a Proposition 48 student, he opted to attend Fork Union Military Academy until qualifying the next year.

As a sophomore in 1992, he missed the first 3 contests with a knee infection, before returning to play in the remaining 9 games. Sturgis was a backup to tight end Greg DeLong, playing mainly on special teams and making only one reception for 14 yards.

As a junior, he was converted into an outside linebacker and defensive end. He became a starter, while registering 33 tackles (4 for loss), 4 quarterback pressures, one pass defensed and one fumble returned for a touchdown.

As a senior, he started at defensive end, posting 39 tackles (9 for loss), 2 sacks, 14 quarterback pressures, 9 passes defensed, one interception returned for a touchdown and 3 fumble recoveries. Against Texas Christian University he had 2 tackles for loss, one sack, 4 quarterback pressures and 2 passes defensed. Against Tulane University he made 3 tackles, 2 tackles for loss, 3 passes defensed and a 10-yard interception return for a touchdown, receiving ACC Defensive Lineman of the Week honors. Against Clemson University he had a career-high 11 tackles (7 solo), 2 tackles for loss and one quarterback pressure.

== Professional career ==
=== Dallas Cowboys ===
Sturgis was selected by the Dallas Cowboys in the seventh round (236th overall) of the 1995 NFL draft. He was declared inactive for the first 13 contests of the season, until Charles Haley underwent back surgery. He was activated for the last 3 games of the season and saw his first professional game action in the fourth quarter against the Arizona Cardinals. He was again declared inactive during the playoffs and was a part of the team that won Super Bowl XXX. In 1996, he was moved to defensive tackle during training camp and was waived on August 25.

=== Green Bay Packers ===
On December 4, 1996, he was signed by the Green Bay Packers. He was released five days later, after being declared inactive for one game.

=== Miami Dolphins ===
On December 18, 1996, he was signed by the Miami Dolphins and was inactive for the last game of the season. In 1997, he was allocated to the Frankfurt Galaxy of the World League of American Football, registering 26 tackles and 2 sacks. He was cut by the Dolphins on August 18, 1997.

=== Carolina Panthers ===
On August, 10, 1998, he signed as a free agent with the Carolina Panthers. He was released on August 23.

=== Montreal Alouettes ===
Sturgis signed with the Montreal Alouettes of the Canadian Football League and was released before the start of the 1998 season.

=== Arizona Rattlers ===
In 1998, he signed with the Arizona Rattlers of the Arena Football League, where he contributed to three consecutive semifinal appearances (1998-2000).

=== Georgia Force ===
In 2002, he signed as a free agent with the Georgia Force. He was released on April 30.

=== Los Angeles Avengers ===
On May 8, 2003, he signed with Los Angeles Avengers and finished the season playing two games.

=== Georgia Force ===
On May 6, 2004, he signed as a free agent with the Georgia Force. He retired at the end of the year, after playing seven seasons in the AFL, finishing with 38 tackles, 3 sacks, 26 passes defensed, 2 forced fumbles, 2 fumble recoveries, one interception and 9 receptions for 95 yards.

== Personal life ==
Sturgis joined the South Georgia Wildcats coaching staff as their defensive coordinator in the 2005 AF2 season.
