= National Railroad Museum and Hall of Fame =

Coordinates: 34.88403°N 79.69380°W

The National Railroad Museum and Hall of Fame is a transportation museum in Hamlet, North Carolina. It opened in 1976 and is adjacent to the restored 1900 passenger station.

The museum features an 1898 map of the Seaboard Air Line Railroad that lights up key routes. Other exhibits demonstrate how rail wheels have changed over time and explain various jobs on the railroads.

The museum has had visitors from all 50 states and more than 30 countries.
