= Hamlet, North Carolina =

- City
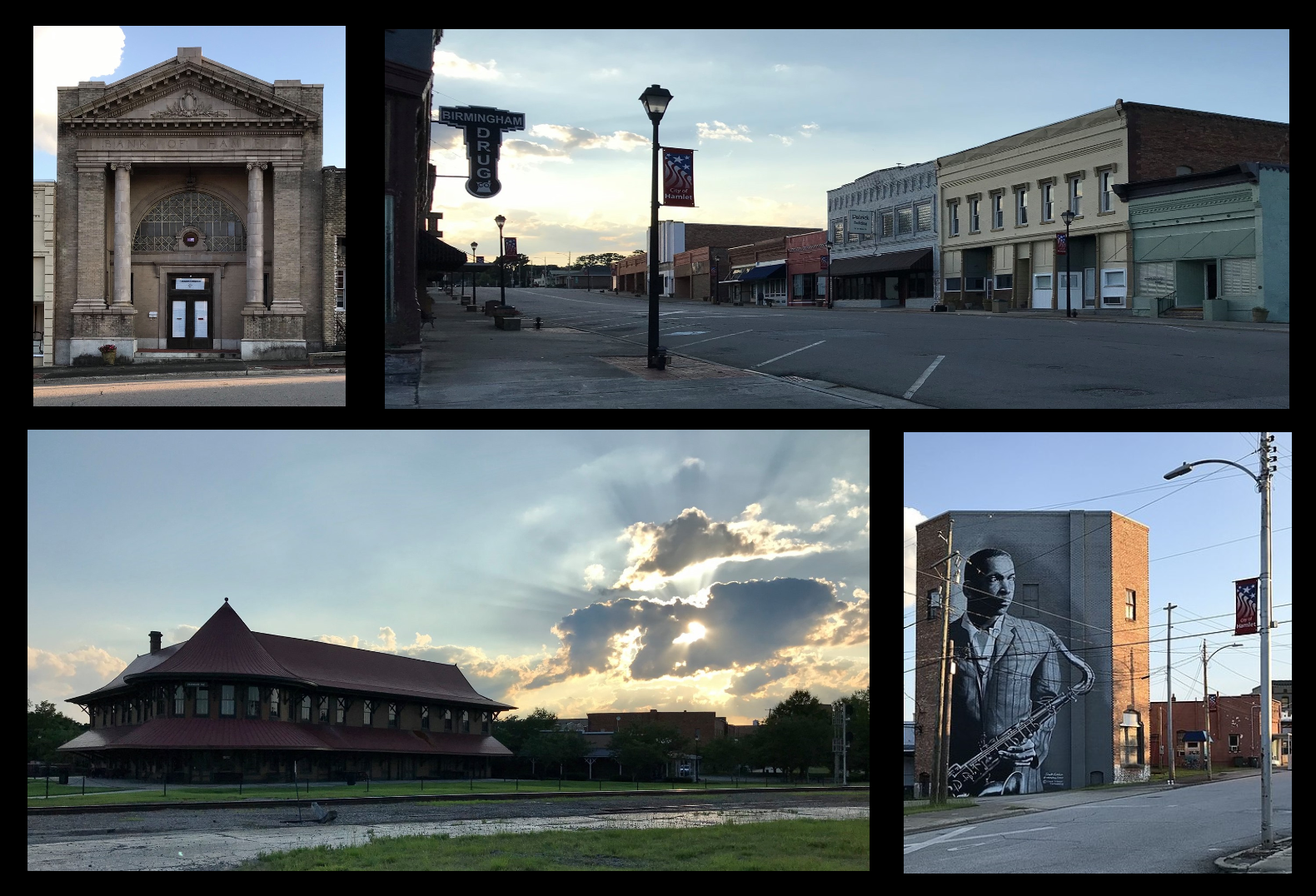
- Clockwise from top left: Bank of Hamlet, Main Street, mural of Hamlet native John Coltrane on Vance Street, Hamlet Depot.

- Flag Seal

- Location within the state of North Carolina
- Coordinates: 34°53′21″N 79°42′36″W
- Country: United States
- State: North Carolina
- County: Richmond
- Settled: 1869
- Incorporated: February 9, 1897

Government
  - Mayor: Amy H. Guinn
  - City Manager: T. John Terziu

Area
  - Total: 5.36 sq mi (13.87 km^{2})
  - Land: 5.27 sq mi (13.64 km^{2})
  - Water: 0.085 sq mi (0.22 km^{2})
- Elevation: 404 ft (123 m)

Population (2020)
  - Total: 6,025
  - Density: 1,143.9/sq mi (441.65/km^{2})
- Time zone: UTC-5 (Eastern (EST))
  - Summer (DST): UTC-4 (EDT)
- ZIP code: 28345
- Area codes: 910, 472
- FIPS code: 37-29160
- GNIS feature ID: 2403787
- Website: www.hamletnc.us

Hamlet is a city in Richmond County, North Carolina, United States. The population was 6,042 at the 2020 census.

== History ==
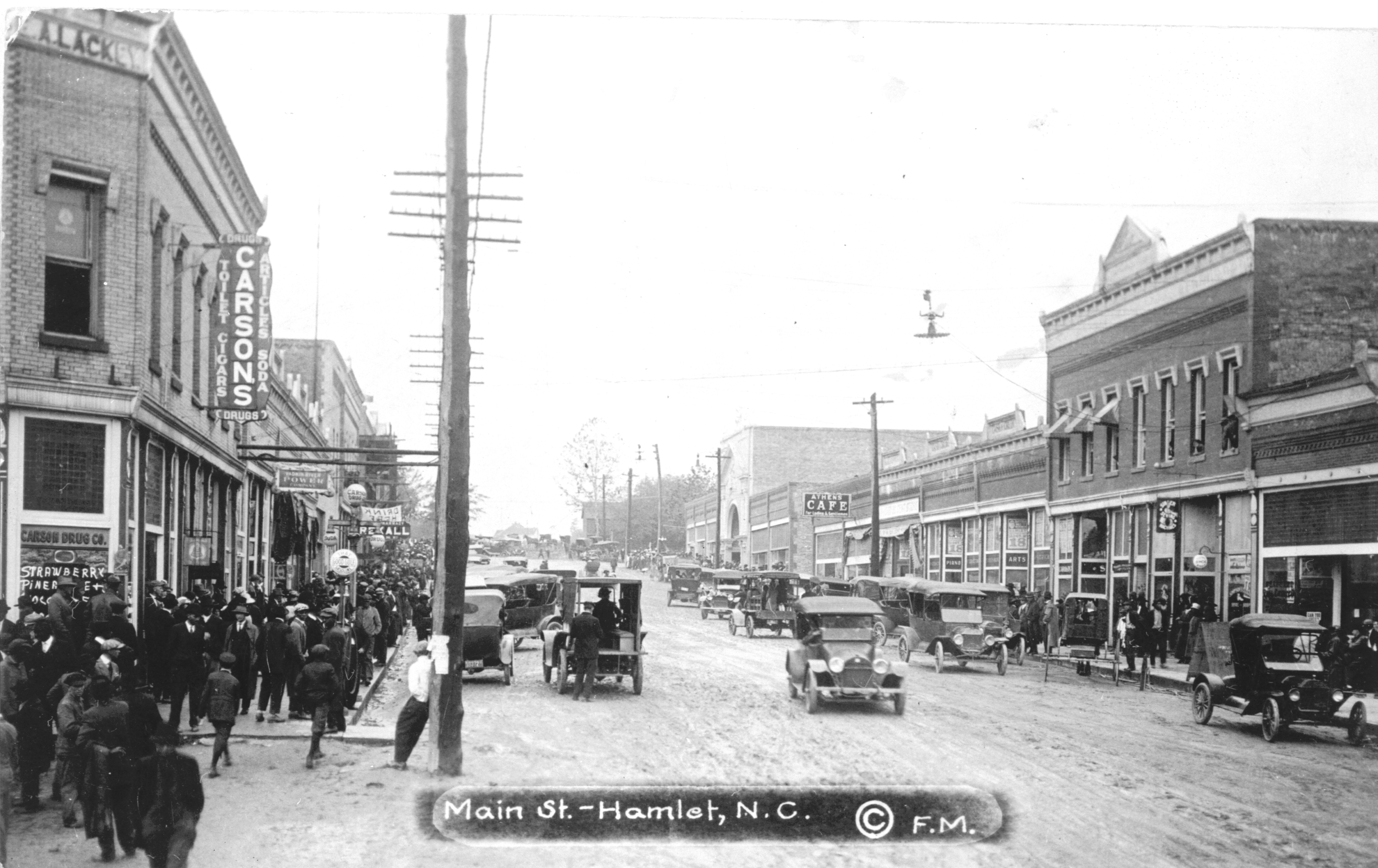
1919 view of Main Street

The area in Richmond County which presently includes Hamlet was originally known as Sandhills. The Wilmington, Charlotte & Rutherford Railroad was extended through the area in 1866. The first house was constructed there in 1869. In 1872 the land was purchased by John Shortridge, an English immigrant who intended on building a textile mill along a creek. He renamed the locale Hamlet the following year, supposedly in homage to hamlets in the British Isles. He planted a sycamore tree to celebrate the occasion, which stood until 1946.

A post office was established in 1876, and that year Shortridge sold a parcel of land to Raleigh and Augusta Air Line Railroad, which completed its own line through Hamlet by the following year. Railway shops were built in 1894 and the town was formally incorporated on February 9, 1897. Seaboard Air Line Railroad decided to establish its regional headquarters there, and Hamlet rapidly grew thereafter. By 1910, the locale hosted two five and dimes, five dry goods stores, and a Coca-Cola bottling plant. From a population of 639 in 1900, the town grew to encompass more than 4,000 residents in 1930. The Hamlet Hospital—the first such facility in the county—was opened in 1915, and by 1940 it had expanded to a new facility and was the largest in the region.

Hamlet's early growth was sustained by Seaboard, which heavily invested in facilities within the town. By the end of World War I, 30 trains passed through Hamlet daily, and the corporation decided to construct a maintenance shop, a roundhouse, and a shipping yard. After World War II, an $11 million classification yard, the first one in the Southeastern United States, was established about one mile north of town, opening in 1954. The Seaboard Line carried mostly freight traffic, but also brought tourists through Hamlet on the Orange Blossom Special, the Boll Weevil, and the Silver Meteor. Before sleeping cars became predominant, many rail passengers would stop in Hamlet and board at the Terminal Hotel or Seaboard Hotel. They provided traffic to the businesses on Main Street, which included several banks, a jewelry store, shoe shop, drug store, hardware store, opera house, and a bowling alley. Throughout the late 19th and early 20th centuries Hamlet was visited by prominent persons including Booker T. Washington, William Jennings Bryan, Franklin D. Roosevelt, Buffalo Bill, Jenny Lind, and Enrico Caruso. Seaboard provided thousands of mostly white men with well-paying, secure employment as conductors, engineers, and brakemen. Workers received sick pay, pension plans, and wages negotiated by national unions. As a result, Hamlet developed a large middle class, unlike the nearby city of Rockingham, which was home to many poorer textile mill workers.

Hamlet's economic situation came under strain beginning in the 1960s, as the railroad faced increasing competition from growing road networks, trucking, and air travel. Seaboard acquired smaller competitors and consolidated its operations, moving workers out of Hamlet. It also froze wages, terminated some positions, and reduced passenger services, diminishing the number of outside visitors to the town. Seaboard became CSX Transportation in 1986. A K-Mart and Walmart were built in Rockingham in the 1970s, providing that municipality with tax revenue and pulling Hamlet's customers away from their own town. Seaboard laid off hundreds of workers while more national business chains with cheaper prices moved into the region, driving down wages and further reducing the viability of Hamlet's traditional businesses along Main Street. Coca-Cola closed its bottling plant in 1973. Racially-charged riots broke out in June 1975 after a Hamlet police officer discharged his gun during an altercation with a black woman. By the late 1980s and early 1990s, many businesses along Main Street and Hamlet Avenue were vacant, and the Terminal Hotel had become a flophouse. Seaboard's facilities employed less than 600 people, and the Hamlet Depot was only serviced by Amtrak passenger trains twice a day and visited occasionally by railfans. National declines in manufacturing, including textiles, also had a wider stagnating effect on Richmond County.

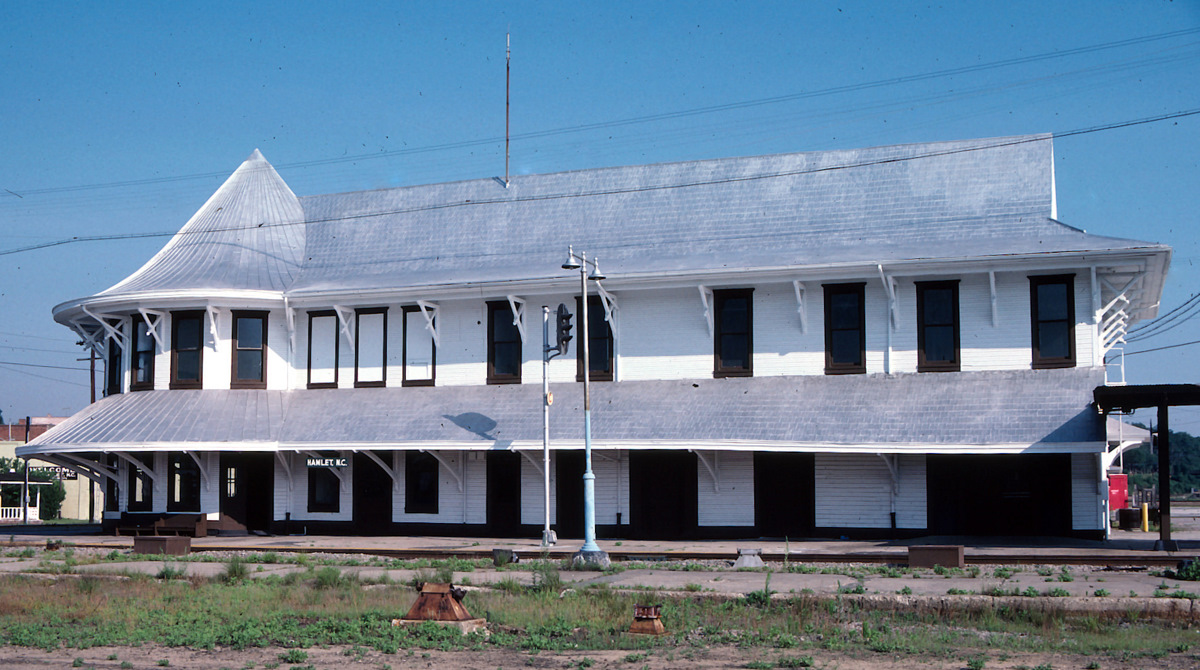
The Hamlet Depot in 1987, prior to its renovation; at this time the station experienced little traffic

Between 1980 and 1990, Hamlet annexed several hundred acres of surrounding territory and gained 1,200 new residents. In 1982 Richmond Community College sponsored the creation of the Seaboard Festival, a community gathering including local vendors, running events, and music, designed to celebrate Hamlet's historical connections to the railroad. A civic board was chartered to put on the event annually. In 1990 portions of the film Billy Bathgate were filmed on Main Street, and in June the city was bestowed with the All-America City Award by the National Civic League, which praised the city's library expansion, efforts to preserve the hospital, and the hosting of the Seaboard Festival.

On September 3, 1991, an industrial fire destroyed the Imperial Food Products plant in Hamlet. Many exits at the plant were locked in violation of fire codes. The fire injured 54 and killed 25 (24 workers and 1 visiting delivery driver). Emmett J. Roe, the plant owner, was sentenced to 19 years in prison for the involuntary manslaughter. State authorities imposed a record fine upon the company for the violations and the incident brought negative national attention to the town. The town spent a total of $13 million to clean up plant site and on related efforts aimed at economic revitalization which attempted to highlight Hamlet's historic connections to the railroad industry with particular efforts focused on renovating the Hamlet Depot.

== Geography ==
According to the United States Census Bureau, the city has a total area of 5.14 square miles (13.3 km^{2}), of which 5.05 sq mi (13.1 km^{2}) is land and 0.09 sq mi (0.23 km^{2}) (1.75%) is water. The Works Progress Administration built an earthen dam in the city in the 1930s, leading to the creation of a 50-acre shallow body of water, the Hamlet City Lake.

=== Climate ===
Climate data for Hamlet, North Carolina (1991–2020)
Month	Jan	Feb	Mar	Apr	May	Jun	Jul	Aug	Sep	Oct	Nov	Dec	Year
Mean daily maximum °F (°C)	54.4 (12.4)	58.6 (14.8)	66.2 (19.0)	75.8 (24.3)	82.6 (28.1)	89.3 (31.8)	92.0 (33.3)	90.1 (32.3)	84.4 (29.1)	75.1 (23.9)	65.0 (18.3)	57.2 (14.0)	74.2 (23.4)
Daily mean °F (°C)	43.5 (6.4)	46.7 (8.2)	53.9 (12.2)	63.3 (17.4)	71.1 (21.7)	78.6 (25.9)	81.8 (27.7)	80.1 (26.7)	74.1 (23.4)	63.1 (17.3)	52.6 (11.4)	46.0 (7.8)	62.9 (17.2)
Mean daily minimum °F (°C)	32.6 (0.3)	34.8 (1.6)	41.5 (5.3)	50.8 (10.4)	59.5 (15.3)	67.8 (19.9)	71.6 (22.0)	70.1 (21.2)	63.8 (17.7)	51.2 (10.7)	40.1 (4.5)	34.7 (1.5)	51.5 (10.9)
Average precipitation inches (mm)	3.71 (94)	3.27 (83)	3.72 (94)	3.17 (81)	3.46 (88)	4.55 (116)	5.81 (148)	5.01 (127)	5.69 (145)	3.82 (97)	3.48 (88)	3.81 (97)	49.5 (1,258)
Average snowfall inches (cm)	0.0 (0.0)	0.3 (0.76)	0.0 (0.0)	0.0 (0.0)	0.0 (0.0)	0.0 (0.0)	0.0 (0.0)	0.0 (0.0)	0.0 (0.0)	0.0 (0.0)	0.0 (0.0)	0.2 (0.51)	0.5 (1.27)
Source: NOAA

== Demographics ==
Historical population
Census	Pop.	Note	%±
1900	639		—
1910	2,173		240.1%
1920	3,808		75.2%
1930	4,801		26.1%
1940	5,111		6.5%
1950	5,061		−1.0%
1960	4,460		−11.9%
1970	4,627		3.7%
1980	4,720		2.0%
1990	6,196		31.3%
2000	6,018		−2.9%
2010	6,495		7.9%
2020	6,025		−7.2%
2021 (est.)	6,022		0.0%
U.S. Decennial Census

=== 2020 census ===
As of the 2020 census, Hamlet had a population of 6,025. The median age was 40.8 years. 23.6% of residents were under the age of 18 and 19.7% were 65 years of age or older. For every 100 females, there were 86.2 males, and for every 100 females age 18 and over, there were 80.3 males.

98.8% of residents lived in urban areas, while 1.2% lived in rural areas.

There were 2,529 households in Hamlet, of which 32.8% had children under the age of 18 living in them. Of all households, 32.5% were married-couple households, 18.9% were households with a male householder and no spouse or partner present, and 41.7% were households with a female householder and no spouse or partner present. About 31.6% of all households were made up of individuals, and 15.3% had someone living alone who was 65 years of age or older.

There were 2,822 housing units, of which 10.4% were vacant. The homeowner vacancy rate was 2.7% and the rental vacancy rate was 6.2%.

Hamlet racial composition
Race	Number	Percentage
White (non-Hispanic)	2,970	49.29%
Black or African American (non-Hispanic)	2,220	36.85%
Native American	139	2.31%
Asian	30	0.5%
Pacific Islander	2	0.03%
Other/Mixed	314	5.21%
Hispanic or Latino	350	5.81%

=== 2000 census ===
As of the census of 2000, there were 6,018 people, 2,453 households, and 1,682 families residing in the city. The population density was 1,192.4 inhabitants per square mile (460.4/km^{2}). There were 2,738 housing units at an average density of 542.5/sq mi (209.5/km^{2}). The racial makeup of the city was 61.85% White, 34.51% African American, 1.61% Native American, 0.35% Asian, 0.48% from other races, and 1.20% from two or more races. Hispanic or Latino of any race were 1.26% of the population.

There were 2,453 households, out of which 30.2% had children under the age of 18 living with them, 44.4% were married couples living together, 20.0% had a female householder with no husband present, and 31.4% were non-families. 28.3% of all households were made up of individuals, and 13.4% had someone living alone who was 65 years of age or older. The average household size was 2.44 and the average family size was 2.98.

In the city, the population was spread out, with 26.0% under the age of 18, 8.5% from 18 to 24, 25.2% from 25 to 44, 23.9% from 45 to 64, and 16.5% who were 65 years of age or older. The median age was 38 years. For every 100 females, there were 88.4 males. For every 100 females age 18 and over, there were 80.5 males.

The median income for a household in the city was $29,013, and the median income for a family was $36,234. Males had a median income of $28,958 versus $23,397 for females. The per capita income for the city was $14,764. About 18.4% of families and 22.2% of the population were below the poverty line, including 33.9% of those under age 18 and 18.2% of those age 65 or over.

== Government and politics ==
Hamlet is governed by a council–manager government.

== Education ==
Hamlet operated its own school system until 1968, when it was absorbed by the Richmond County School System. The town is home to the Fairview Heights Elementary School, Monroe Avenue Elementary School, Hamlet Middle School, and Richmond County Ninth Grade Academy. High school students are served by the Richmond Senior High School, located west of the city. The Richmond Community College, which serves Richmond and Scotland counties, was established in Hamlet in 1964. It maintains a 160-acre campus adjacent to U.S. Route 74 and offers associate degrees.

== Additional information ==
Hamlet is at the junction of three major CSX rail lines, one running north towards Raleigh, North Carolina, as well as south towards Savannah, Georgia, and the second running east towards Wilmington, North Carolina, and west towards Bostic, North Carolina. At Monroe, North Carolina, the line splits northwest to Charlotte and Bostic, and one continues west to Atlanta, Georgia, originally on to Birmingham, Alabama; however, tracks were removed in 1987. The third line splits off from the second just east of Hamlet and continues towards Charleston, South Carolina. It has been cited as the prime spot in North Carolina for train watchers.

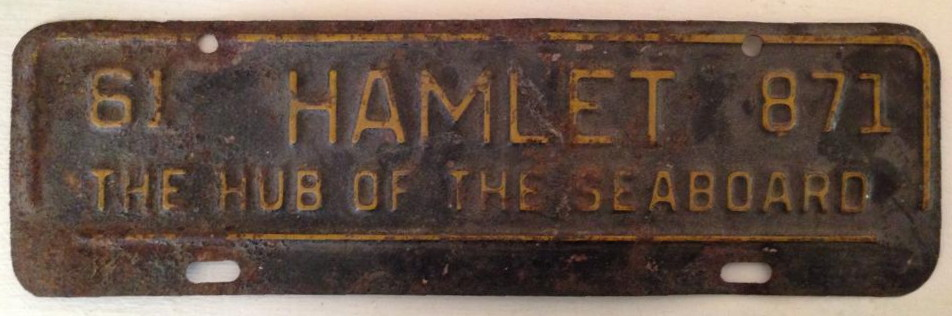
In the 1960s, city license tags proclaimed Hamlet as "The Hub of The Seaboard."

The National Railroad Museum and Hall of Fame is also located in Hamlet.

Hamlet was the largest city in Richmond County at one time, but it has been surpassed by neighboring Rockingham. In the early part of the 20th century, more than 30 trains stopped in Hamlet daily, en route to New York City, New Orleans, Suffolk and cities in Florida. Known as "The Hub of the Seaboard," Hamlet had seven hotels and numerous boarding houses and restaurants catering to transferring rail passengers. "Hamlet was like the Charlotte airport is today," said Miranda Chavis, manager of the railroad museum.

In addition to the Hamlet Passenger Station, the Main Street Commercial Historic District is also listed on the National Register of Historic Places.

== Current development and industry ==
In 2025, Amazon purchased a 625 acre site for a data center in Hamlet to be built in 2026. There was no public input on the purchase or development of the data center, which has been controversial in the community.

== Notable people ==
- Frederick C. Branch, first African-American United States Marine Corps officer
- Louis Breeden, former NFL player, defensive back with the Cincinnati Bengals
- John Coltrane, jazz saxophonist and composer, recipient of Grammy Lifetime Achievement Award
- Dannell Ellerbe, football player, two-time Super Bowl champion with the Baltimore Ravens and Philadelphia Eagles
- Wayne Goodwin, politician, state legislator, served on the North Carolina Council of State several terms
- Billy Harris, former MLB infielder
- Melvin Ingram, NFL player, linebacker with the Miami Dolphins
- Ashton Locklear, two-time United States women's artistic gymnastics gold medalist in the uneven bars and 2014 World Champion
- Mike Quick, former NFL player, wide receiver with the Philadelphia Eagles
- Tom Wicker, former Washington bureau chief and columnist for The New York Times
- Perry Williams, former NFL player, cornerback with the New York Giants

== Works cited ==
- Huneycutt, James E.; Huneycutt, Ida C. (1976). A History of Richmond County. Rockingham: Huneycutt. OCLC 2493245.
- North Carolina Manual 2005 - 2006 (PDF). Raleigh: North Carolina Secretary of State. 2005.
- Simon, Bryant (2020). The Hamlet Fire: A Tragic Story of Cheap Food, Cheap Government, and Cheap Lives. Chapel Hill: The University of North Carolina Press. ISBN 9781469661377.
- Water Resources Development in North Carolina 1993, Atlanta: United States Army Corps of Engineers, January 1, 1993
