= Harry Stanback =

American football player (born 1958)

No. 93
- Position: Defensive end

Personal information
- Born: August 17, 1958 (age 68); Rockingham, North Carolina, U.S.
- Listed height: 6 ft 5 in (1.96 m)
- Listed weight: 255 lb (116 kg)

Career information
- High school: Richmond (Rockingham)
- College: North Carolina
- NFL draft: 1981: 6th round, 164th overall pick

Career history
- Atlanta Falcons (1981); Baltimore Colts (1982)
- Stats at Pro Football Reference

Harry Stanback (born August 17, 1958) is an American former professional football player who was a defensive end for the Baltimore Colts of the National Football League (NFL) in 1982. He played college football for the North Carolina Tar Heels.
