= Richmond Community College =

College in Hamlet, North Carolina, U.S.

- Type: Public community college
- Established: 1967
- Parent institution: North Carolina Community College System
- President: Dale McInnis
- Location: Hamlet, North Carolina, United States; 34.903211°N 79.710381°W
- Nickname: Panthers
- Website: richmondcc.edu

Richmond Community College is a public community college in Hamlet, North Carolina. It serves residents of Richmond and Scotland counties. The college is part of the North Carolina Community College System.

== Campuses ==
Richmond Community College maintains a satellite campus in Scotland County.

== Academics ==
The RichmondCC Guarantee provides free college to any incoming student with a 3.0 GPA and 2 college classes.
