= Perry Williams (cornerback) =

American football player (born 1961)

No. 23
- Position: Cornerback

Personal information
- Born: May 12, 1961 (age 65); Hamlet, North Carolina, U.S.
- Listed height: 6 ft 2 in (1.88 m)
- Listed weight: 200 lb (91 kg)

Career information
- High school: Richmond (Rockingham, North Carolina)
- College: NC State
- NFL draft: 1983: 7th round, 178th overall pick

Career history
- New York Giants (1984–1993); New York Jets (1994)*
- * Offseason or practice squad member only

Awards and highlights
- 2× Super Bowl champion (XXI, XXV)

Career NFL statistics
- Interceptions: 18
- Fumble recoveries: 8
- Sacks: 5
- Stats at Pro Football Reference

Perry Lamar Williams (born May 12, 1961) is an American former professional football player who was a cornerback in the National Football League (NFL). He was selected by the New York Giants in the seventh round of the 1983 NFL draft.

== Early life ==
Williams attended Richmond Senior High School in Rockingham, North Carolina. He has a part of Richmond's 1978 state championship football team. Williams was inducted into the Raider Athletic Hall of Fame in 2025.

== College career ==
He played college football for the NC State Wolfpack. He also ran track for the Wolfpack's track and field team and held the 55m indoor track record in 1983 with a time of 6.22 seconds.

== Professional career ==
He played for the Giants from 1984 to 1993. Williams won two Super Bowls while with the Giants.

Together with George Martin, Williams is an alum of Fairleigh Dickinson University-Florham (BA 1987), as the first two Giants players to graduate from the school's NFL degree completion program.

== Personal life ==
He works at Long Island University Post (LIU) as the Director of Sports Management.
