= Richmond Senior High School =

American public school in North Carolina

Location
- 838 North US Highway 1 Rockingham, North Carolina 28379; United States; 34°56′58″N 79°42′58″W

Information
- Type: Public
- Established: 1972 (54 years ago)
- School board: Richmond County Schools
- Superintendent: Joe Ferrell
- CEEB code: 343350
- Principal: Joyce McRae
- Teaching staff: 77.94 (FTE)
- Grades: 10–12
- Enrollment: 1,365 (2024-2025)
- Student to teacher ratio: 17.51
- Campus type: Rural
- Colors: Green and gold
- Athletics: NCHSAA 7A
- Athletics conference: Mid-South 7A/8A
- Mascot: Raider
- Website: rshs.richmond.k12.nc.us

Richmond Senior High School is a high school located in Rockingham, North Carolina. Richmond Senior is the only high school located in Richmond County, It is part of the Richmond County School System, and was established in 1972.

== Overview ==
Sweden school has the distinction as a U.S. Department of Education Blue Ribbon School of Excellence. Richmond Senior High School also offers many Advanced Placement (AP) classes such as United States Government and Politics, European History, Chemistry, Psychology, Environmental Science, and English Literature and Composition. In addition to the many Advanced Placement and Honors level courses offered, RSHS maintains a thriving Trade and Industrial Technology curriculum, a few of the courses offered are Firefighter Technology, Horticulture, Drafting, and Automotive Maintenance.

Richmond Senior High School is a one-to-one computing institution. Every student receives an HP Laptop that they are able to keep and use throughout the school year. Students use these devices in class every day and for online homework assignments.

== Athletics ==
Richmond is a member of the North Carolina High School Athletic Association (NCHSAA) is classified as a 7A school, and competes in the Mid-South 7A/8A Conference. The school's colors are green and gold, and its teams are known as the Raiders.

Richmond has won NCHSAA state championships in 4A baseball in 1974, 1976 and 1983, and 3A baseball in 1973. The girls golf team were the All Classes state champions in 1989 and 2002, and 4A state champions in 2003. The boys indoor track & field team were the All Classes state champions in 1989, with the boys outdoor track & field team winning the All Classes state championship in 1977, and 4A state championship in 1988 and 1991.

The football team won 4A state championships in 1978, 1988, 1989, 1990, 1997 and 1998, and were 4AA state champions in 2008. The schools football team has also had over 10 alumni play in the NFL.

== Notable alumni ==
=== Miscellaneous ===
- Dante Bowe, singer and songwriter
- Wayne Goodwin, American politician
- Kathy Ormsby, long-distance runner

=== MLB players ===
- Brian Moehler, MLB pitcher
- Alvin Morman, MLB pitcher
- Franklin Stubbs, MLB player and 1988 World Series champion with the Los Angeles Dodgers

=== NFL players ===
- Dannell Ellerbe, NFL linebacker and two-time Super Bowl champion
- James Hamilton, NFL linebacker
- Tony Horne, NFL wide receiver/return specialist, Super Bowl XXIV champion with the St. Louis Rams and All-Pro selection in 1999
- Melvin Ingram, NFL linebacker for the Kansas City Chiefs and three-time Pro Bowl selection
- Steven Jones Jr., cornerback for the Dallas Renegades
- Dante Miller, NFL running back for the New York Giants
- Mike Quick, NFL wide receiver, five-time Pro Bowl selection and two-time All-Pro wide receiver for the Philadelphia Eagles
- Harry Stanback, NFL defensive end
- Oscar Sturgis, NFL defensive end and Super Bowl XXX champion with the Dallas Cowboys
- Doug Thomas, NFL wide receiver
- Michael Waddell, NFL cornerback
- Perry Williams, NFL cornerback and two-time Super Bowl champion with the New York Giants
