= Michael Waddell (American football) =

American football player (born 1981)

No. 36, 32
- Position: Cornerback

Personal information
- Born: January 9, 1981 (age 45); Ellerbe, North Carolina, U.S.
- Listed height: 5 ft 10 in (1.78 m)
- Listed weight: 187 lb (85 kg)

Career information
- High school: Richmond (NC)
- College: North Carolina
- NFL draft: 2004: 4th round, 124th overall pick

Career history
- Tennessee Titans (2004–2006); Oakland Raiders (2008); Florida Tuskers (2009)*
- * Offseason or practice squad member only

Awards and highlights
- Second-team All-ACC (2001)

Career NFL statistics
- Total tackles: 72
- Sacks: 0.5
- Fumble recoveries: 2
- Interceptions: 1
- Stats at Pro Football Reference

Michael Andre Waddell, Jr. (born January 9, 1981) is an American former professional football player who was a cornerback in the National Football League (NFL). He was selected by the Tennessee Titans in the fourth round of the 2004 NFL draft with the 124th overall pick.

== Early life ==
Waddell attended Richmond Senior High School in Rockingham, North Carolina. He was a member of two state championship football teams while at Richmond, and holds the NCHSAA record for most punt return touchdowns in a season with 7. He was also honored as a Parade All-American in 1999. Waddell was inducted in the Raider Athletic Hall of Fame in 2025.

== College career ==
He played college football for the North Carolina Tar Heels from 2000 to 2003.

== Professional career ==
=== Tennessee Titans ===
Drafted by the Tennessee Titans in the 4th round of the 2004 NFL draft, he was a member of the Titans from 2004 to 2006.

=== Oakland Raiders ===
Waddell was a member of the Oakland Raiders in 2008.

=== Florida Tuskers ===
Waddell was signed by the Florida Tuskers of the United Football League on August 25, 2009. He was released by the Tuskers before the season began.
