= 2016 Buffalo Bills season =

57th season in franchise history

- Owner: Terry and Kim Pegula
- General manager: Doug Whaley
- Head coach: Rex Ryan (fired December 27, 7–8 record); Anthony Lynn (interim, 0–1 record)
- Home stadium: New Era Field

Results
- Record: 7–9
- Division place: 3rd AFC East
- Playoffs: Did not qualify
- All-Pros: 2: LB Lorenzo Alexander (2nd team); LB Zach Brown (2nd team)
- Pro Bowlers: 6: DT Kyle Williams; OG Richie Incognito; OLB Lorenzo Alexander; RB LeSean McCoy; CB Stephon Gilmore; ILB Zach Brown

Uniform
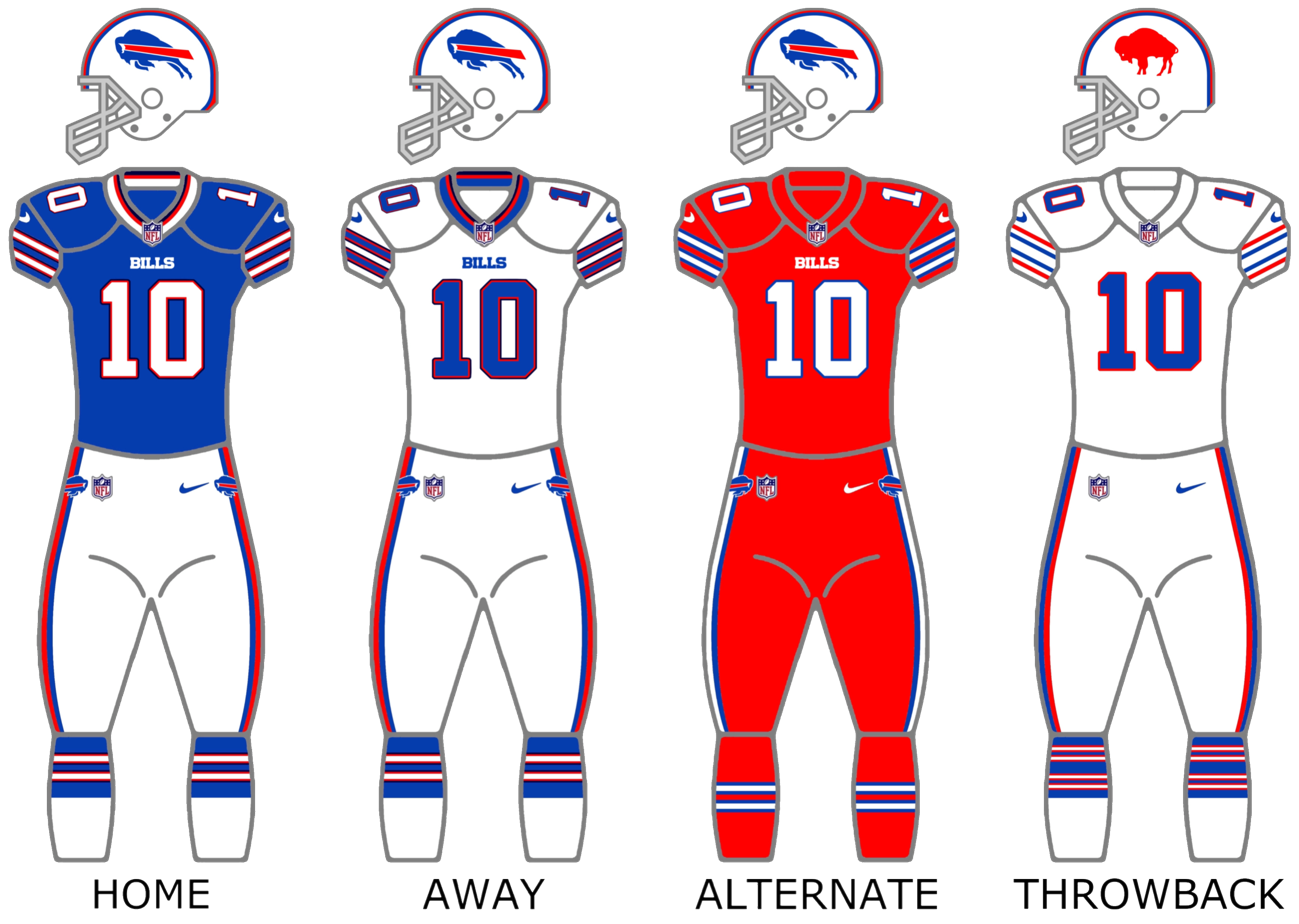

The 2016 season was the Buffalo Bills' 47th in the National Football League (NFL), their 57th overall, their fourth under general manager Doug Whaley and their second under head coach Rex Ryan. The Bills hoped to improve on their 8–8 record from 2015, the team's first since 2002, but a 34–31 overtime loss to the Miami Dolphins in Week 16 eliminated the Bills from playoff contention for a 17th season in a row, extending the longest active drought among all four North American major professional sports leagues. It would be Ryan's final season as head coach of the team, as he and his brother, assistant head coach Rob, were fired with one game remaining in the regular season.

== Offseason ==
=== Roster changes ===
==== Signings ====
Position	Player	2015 Team	Date signed	Notes	Source
RB	Mike Gillislee	Buffalo Bills	January 4, 2016	1-year extension/$600,000	
RB	James Wilder, Jr.	Cincinnati Bengals	January 20, 2016	1 year/$525,000 (Reserve/Future)	
RB	Reggie Bush	San Francisco 49ers	August 1, 2016	1 year/$3 million	
TE	Jim Dray	Cleveland Browns	March 16, 2016	1 year/$760,000	
WR	Greg Salas	Buffalo Bills	January 4, 2016	1-year extension/$600,000	
WR	Leonard Hankerson	Buffalo Bills	April 4, 2016	1 year/$840,000	
WR	Kain Colter	Minnesota Vikings	August 1, 2016	1 year/$450,000	
OG	Richie Incognito	Buffalo Bills	March 8, 2016	3-year extension/$15.75 million	
OG	Fernando Velasco	Carolina Panthers	April 7, 2016	1 year/$965,000	
OT	Jordan Mills	Buffalo Bills	March 30, 2016	1 year tender/$1.67 million	
OT	Chris Martin	Miami Dolphins	June 13, 2016	1 year/$525,000	
OT	Cordy Glenn	Buffalo Bills	May 3, 2016	5-year extension/$65 million	
OT	Justin Renfrow	San Francisco 49ers	June 17, 2016	1 year/$450,000	
DT	Corbin Bryant	Buffalo Bills	March 7, 2016	1 year tender/$1.67 million	
DT	Casey Walker	Dallas Cowboys	July 30, 2016	1 year/$525,000	
LB	Zach Brown	Tennessee Titans	April 4, 2016	1 year/$1.25 million	
LB	Lorenzo Alexander	Oakland Raiders	April 13, 2016	1 year/$885,000	
CB	Mario Butler	Buffalo Bills	January 4, 2016	1-year extension/$600,000	
CB/KR	Javier Arenas	New York Jets	February 3, 2016	1 year/$600,000 (Reserve/Future)	
CB	Corey White	Arizona Cardinals	April 4, 2016	1 year/$840,000	
CB	Sterling Moore	Tampa Bay Buccaneers	April 5, 2016	1 year/$840,000	
SS	Robert Blanton	Minnesota Vikings	March 18, 2016	1 year/$840,000	
SS	Colt Anderson	Indianapolis Colts	April 13, 2016	1 year/$840,000	
P	Colton Schmidt	Buffalo Bills	January 4, 2016	1-year extension/$600,000	
WR	Percy Harvin	Buffalo Bills	November 1, 2016		

==== Free agents lost ====
Position	Player	2016 Team	Date signed	Notes	Source
WR	Chris Hogan	New England Patriots	March 11, 2016	3 years/$12 million	
DT	Stefan Charles	Detroit Lions	March 10, 2016	1 year/$1.75 million	
LB	Nigel Bradham	Philadelphia Eagles	March 9, 2016	2 years/$7 million	
CB	Ron Brooks	Philadelphia Eagles	March 9, 2016	3 years/$5.5 million	
CB	Leodis McKelvin	Philadelphia Eagles	March 10, 2016	3 years/$9 million	

==== Cuts ====
Position	Player	Date	Source
RB	Boobie Dixon	March 1, 2016	
WR	Davonte Allen	August 1, 2016	
TE	MarQueis Gray	March 1, 2016	
TE	Jacob Maxwell	April 29, 2016	
T	Tyson Chandler	April 15, 2016	
T	Keith Lumpkin	June 13, 2016	
G	Kraig Urbik	March 1, 2016	
C	Ronald Patrick	May 2, 2016	
DE	Mario Williams	March 1, 2016	
DE	Cedric Reed	July 30, 2016	
DE	Claudell Louis	June 13, 2016	
DE	Jarius Wynn	May 2, 2016	
LB	Tony Steward	April 19, 2016	
CB	Leodis McKelvin	March 4, 2016	
CB	Cam Thomas	April 18, 2016	
CB	Julian Whigham	June 9, 2016	
CB	Merrill Noel	May 2, 2016	
S	Phillip Thomas	June 17, 2016	
K	Marshall Morgan	August 1, 2016	

==== Retirements ====
Position	Player	Date
LB	A.J. Tarpley	April 6, 2016

=== Draft ===
==== Pre-Draft ====
Prior to the draft, the Bills held visits for 47 players; 8 had previous visits, 23 players visited during the NFL Scouting Combine, 2 at the East–West Shrine Game, 19 had private visits, and 3 had private workouts.

Previously, the Bills traded their 2016 seventh-round selection (240th overall) and their 2015 fifth-round selection (137th overall) to the Minnesota Vikings in exchange for quarterback Matt Cassel and the Vikings' 2015 sixth-round selection (188th overall).

==== Day-of Activity ====
2016 Buffalo Bills draft
Round	Pick	Player	Position	College	Notes
1	19	Shaq Lawson	DE	Clemson	
2	41	Reggie Ragland	LB	Alabama	Pick from CHI
3	80	Adolphus Washington	DE	Ohio State	
4	139	Cardale Jones	QB	Ohio St	Compensatory
5	156	Jonathan Williams	RB	Arkansas	
6	192	Kolby Listenbee	WR	TCU	
6	218	Kevon Seymour	CB	USC	Compensatory
Made roster † Pro Football Hall of Fame * Made at least one Pro Bowl during career

The Bills traded their 2016 second-round pick (49th overall) and fourth-round pick (117th overall) to the Chicago Bears in return for Chicago's 2016 second-round pick (41st overall).

=== Undrafted free agents ===
All undrafted free agents were signed after the 2016 NFL draft concluded on April 30 unless otherwise noted.

Position	Player	College	Notes
QB	Joe Licata	Buffalo	Tryout basis. Signed with Cincinnati Bengals before training camp.
FB	Glenn Gronkowski	Kansas State	Brother of Chris, Dan and Rob Gronkowski. Signed with New England Patriots after training camp to reunite with his brother Rob.
WR	Davonte Allen	Marshall	
WR	Garry Chambers	Arizona State	
OT	Keith Lumpkin	Rutgers	
OG	Jamison Lalk	Iowa State	
OG	Marquis Lucas	WVU	
C	Robert Kuglar	Purdue	
DT	Justin Zimmer	Ferris	
DE	Bryson Albright	Miami	
LB	Eric Striker	Oklahoma	
CB	Julian Whigham	Syracuse	
LS	Reid Ferguson	LSU	
K	Marshall Morgan	Georgia	

=== Staff ===
On January 10, 2016, one week after the 2015 season ended, Doug Whaley signed a three-year contract extension to remain the Bills general manager. That same day, it was announced that Ryan had hired his twin brother, Rob, to the Bills coaching staff to serve as an assistant head coach and work with the defense. Three days later, Ryan hired former NFL standout Ed Reed to be an assistant defensive backs coach.

On January 20, 2016, the Bills promoted Kathryn Smith to special teams quality control coach, making her the first female full-time coach in NFL history. On September 16, 2016, less than 24 hours after losing 37–31 to the New York Jets in their home opener in a game in which the defense failed to stop Jets running back Matt Forte, instead of firing defensive coordinator Dennis Thurman, Ryan pretty much sealed his own fate by firing offensive coordinator Greg Roman and promoting running backs coach Anthony Lynn to the position.

Lynn would later be promoted to interim head coach on December 27, 2016, when the Ryan brothers were fired after the 34–31 overtime loss to the Dolphins eliminated the team from the playoffs.

== Staff ==
2016 Buffalo Bills staff
Front office: Owner/CEO – Terry Pegula; Owner – Kim Pegula; President – Russ Brandon; General manager – Doug Whaley; Senior vice president of football administration – Jim Overdorf; Director of football administration – Don Purdy; Director of football operations – Kevin Meganck; Director of analytics – Michael Lyons; Director of player personnel – Jim Monos; Player personnel advisor – Kelvin Fisher; Director of pro personnel – Rob Hanrahan; Special assistant – Ron Hughes; Special assistant – Buddy Nix; Head coaches: Interim head coach/running backs – Anthony Lynn; Assistant head coach/offense – Chris Palmer; Offensive coaches: Quarterbacks – David Lee; Assistant quarterbacks – Jason Vrable; Wide receivers – Sanjay Lal; Tight ends – Tony Sparano Jr.; Offensive line – Aaron Kromer; Offensive assistant – Pat Meyer	Defensive coaches: Defensive coordinator – Dennis Thurman; Defensive line – John Blake; Assistant defensive line – Jason Rebrovich; Linebackers – Bobby April III; Outside linebackers – Jeff Weeks; Defensive backs – Tim McDonald; Assistant defensive backs – Ed Reed; Defensive assistant – D'Anton Lynn; Special teams coaches: Special teams – Danny Crossman; Assistant special teams – Eric Smith; Special teams quality control – Kathryn Smith; Strength and conditioning: Head strength and conditioning – Eric Ciano; Assistant head strength and conditioning – Hal Luther; Strength and conditioning assistant – Jason Oszvart; Strength and conditioning assistant – Dan Liburd; Strength and conditioning assistant – Mark Loecher

== Final roster ==
2016 Buffalo Bills roster
Quarterbacks (QB): 7 Cardale Jones; 3 EJ Manuel; 5 Tyrod Taylor; Running backs (RB): 22 Reggie Bush; 42 Jerome Felton FB; 35 Mike Gillislee; 25 LeSean McCoy; 31 Jonathan Williams; Wide receivers (WR): 88 Marquise Goodwin; 17 Justin Hunter; 13 Dezmin Lewis; 15 Brandon Tate; 14 Sammy Watkins; 10 Robert Woods; Tight ends (TE): 87 Gerald Christian; 85 Charles Clay; 84 Nick O'Leary; 82 Logan Thomas	Offensive linemen (OL): 77 Cordy Glenn T; 72 Ryan Groy C; 64 Richie Incognito G; 71 Cyrus Kouandjio T; 67 Patrick Lewis C; 76 John Miller G; 79 Jordan Mills T; 74 Michael Ola T; Defensive linemen (DL): 98 Deandre Coleman NT; 99 Marcell Dareus NT; 91 Leger Douzable DE; 92 Adolphus Washington DE; 95 Kyle Williams DE; 94 Jerel Worthy DE	Linebackers (LB): 57 Lorenzo Alexander OLB; 52 Preston Brown ILB; 53 Zach Brown ILB; 55 Jerry Hughes OLB; 50 Ramon Humber ILB; 90 Shaq Lawson OLB; 56 Lerentee McCray OLB; 51 Brandon Spikes ILB; Defensive backs (DB): 38 Sergio Brown FS; 28 Ronald Darby CB; 37 Shamiel Gary FS; 24 Stephon Gilmore CB; 20 Corey Graham FS; 36 Jonathan Meeks SS; 39 Marcus Roberson CB; 21 Nickell Robey-Coleman CB; 29 Kevon Seymour CB; 30 Corey White SS; Special teams (ST): 2 Dan Carpenter K; 65 Garrison Sanborn LS; 6 Colton Schmidt P	Practice squad: 49 Bryson Albright OLB; 16 Ed Eagan WR; 73 Isame Faciane G; 69 Reid Ferguson LS; 63 Dalton Freeman C; 40 Charles Gaines CB; 47 Manasseh Garner TE; 44 Cedric O'Neal RB; 41 Damian Parms SS (IR); 43 Joe Powell FS (IR); 93 Greg Townsend DE; 54 Max Valles OLB; Reserve: 33 Colt Anderson SS (IR); 26 Robert Blanton SS (IR); 97 Corbin Bryant NT (IR); 31 Jonathan Dowling SS (IR); 81 Marcus Easley WR (PUP); 75 IK Enemkpali DE (IR); 89 Chris Gragg TE (IR); 11 Percy Harvin WR (NF-Ill.); 66 Seantrel Henderson T (Susp.); 27 James Ihedigbo SS (IR); 18 Kolby Listenbee WR (NF-Inj.); 19 Walt Powell WR (IR); 59 Reggie Ragland ILB (IR); -- Phillip Thomas SS (IR); 23 Aaron Williams SS (IR); 70 Eric Wood C (IR); Rookies in italics 53 active, 18 reserve, 10 practice squad

== Schedule ==
=== Preseason ===
Week	Date	Opponent	Result	Record	Venue	Recap
1	August 13	Indianapolis Colts	**L** 18–19	0–1	Ralph Wilson Stadium	Recap
2	August 20	New York Giants	**W** 21–0	1–1	New Era Field	Recap
3	August 26	at Washington Redskins	**L** 16–21	1–2	FedExField	Recap
4	September 1	at Detroit Lions	**L** 0–31	1–3	Ford Field	Recap

=== Regular season ===
Week	Date	Opponent	Result	Record	Venue	Recap
1	September 11	at Baltimore Ravens	**L** 7–13	0–1	M&T Bank Stadium	Recap
2	September 15	**New York Jets**	**L** 31–37	0–2	New Era Field	Recap
3	September 25	Arizona Cardinals	**W** 33–18	1–2	New Era Field	Recap
4	October 2	at **New England Patriots**	**W** 16–0	2–2	Gillette Stadium	Recap
5	October 9	at Los Angeles Rams	**W** 30–19	3–2	Los Angeles Memorial Coliseum	Recap
6	October 16	San Francisco 49ers	**W** 45–16	4–2	New Era Field	Recap
7	October 23	at **Miami Dolphins**	**L** 25–28	4–3	Hard Rock Stadium	Recap
8	October 30	**New England Patriots**	**L** 25–41	4–4	New Era Field	Recap
9	November 7	at Seattle Seahawks	**L** 25–31	4–5	CenturyLink Field	Recap
10	Bye					
11	November 20	at Cincinnati Bengals	**W** 16–12	5–5	Paul Brown Stadium	Recap
12	November 27	Jacksonville Jaguars	**W** 28–21	6–5	New Era Field	Recap
13	December 4	at Oakland Raiders	**L** 24–38	6–6	Oakland Alameda Coliseum	Recap
14	December 11	Pittsburgh Steelers	**L** 20–27	6–7	New Era Field	Recap
15	December 18	Cleveland Browns	**W** 33–13	7–7	New Era Field	Recap
16	December 24	**Miami Dolphins**	**L** 31–34 (OT)	7–8	New Era Field	Recap
17	January 1	at **New York Jets**	**L** 10–30	7–9	MetLife Stadium	Recap

Note: Intra-division opponents are in bold text.

== Game summaries ==
=== Week 1: at Baltimore Ravens ===
Week One: Buffalo Bills at Baltimore Ravens

Quarter	1	2	3	4	Total
Bills	0	7	0	0	7
Ravens	3	7	0	3	13

at M&T Bank Stadium, Baltimore, Maryland

- Date: September 11
- Game time: 1:00 p.m. EDT
- Game weather: 84 °F (29 °C), partly cloudy
- Game attendance: 71,104
- Referee: Brad Allen
- TV announcers (CBS): Spero Dedes and Solomon Wilcots
- Recap, Game book

Game information

First quarter

- BAL – Justin Tucker 50-yard field goal, 0:35. Ravens 3–0. Drive: 9 plays, 59 yards, 4:47.

Second quarter

- BAL – Mike Wallace 66-yard pass from Joe Flacco (Justin Tucker kick), 10:11. Ravens 10–0. Drive: 6 plays, 85 yards, 2:48.
- BUF – LeSean McCoy 1-yard run (Dan Carpenter kick), 3:02. Ravens 10–7. Drive: 12 plays, 75 yards, 7:09.

Third quarter

- No scoring plays

Fourth quarter

- BAL – Justin Tucker 37-yard field goal, 5:39. Ravens 13–7. Drive: 13 plays, 59 yards, 5:59.

Top passers

- BUF – Tyrod Taylor – 15/22, 111 yards
- BAL – Joe Flacco – 23/34, 258 yards, TD

Top rushers

- BUF – LeSean McCoy – 13 rushes, 58 yards, TD
- BAL – Justin Forsett – 10 rushes, 41 yards

Top receivers

- BUF – Sammy Watkins – 4 receptions, 43 yards
- BAL – Mike Wallace – 3 receptions, 91 yards, TD

=== Week 2: vs. New York Jets ===
Week Two: New York Jets at Buffalo Bills

Quarter	1	2	3	4	Total
Jets	6	14	7	10	37
Bills	7	3	14	7	31

at New Era Field, Orchard Park, New York

- Date: September 15
- Game time: 8:25 p.m. EDT
- Game weather: 60 °F (16 °C), partly cloudy
- Game attendance: 70,256
- Referee: Ed Hochuli
- TV announcers (CBS/NFLN/Twitter): Jim Nantz, Phil Simms and Tracy Wolfson
- Recap, Game book

Game information

First quarter

- NYJ – Nick Folk 28-yard field goal, 6:41. Jets 3–0. Drive: 15 plays, 65 yards, 8:19.
- BUF – Marquise Goodwin 84-yard pass from Tyrod Taylor (Dan Carpenter kick), 5:16. Bills 7–3. Drive: 3 plays, 82 yards, 1:25.
- NYJ – Nick Folk 29-yard field goal, 0:00. Bills 7–6. Drive: 9 plays, 75 yards, 5:16.

Second quarter

- NYJ – Matt Forte 1-yard run (Nick Folk kick), 11:07. Jets 13–7. Drive: 6 plays, 66 yards, 2:15.
- NYJ – Eric Decker 5-yard pass from Ryan Fitzpatrick (Nick Folk kick), 3:53. Jets 20–7. Drive: 7 plays, 77 yards, 3:54.
- BUF – Dan Carpenter 39-yard field goal, 0:05. Jets 20–10. Drive: 13 plays, 54 yards, 3:48.

Third quarter

- BUF – Greg Salas 71-yard pass from Tyrod Taylor (Dan Carpenter kick), 14:09. Jets 20–17. Drive: 3 plays, 75 yards, 0:51.
- BUF – Nickell Robey-Coleman 36-yard fumble return (Dan Carpenter kick), 11:15. Bills 24–20.
- NYJ – Matt Forte 3-yard run (Nick Folk kick), 2:12. Jets 27–24. Drive: 12 plays, 84 yards, 6:27.

Fourth quarter

- NYJ – Nick Folk 36-yard field goal, 10:40. Jets 30–24. Drive: 8 plays, 69 yards, 4:12.
- NYJ – Matt Forte 12-yard run (Nick Folk kick), 4:02. Jets 37–24. Drive: 5 plays, 56 yards, 3:01.
- BUF – Mike Gillislee 18-yard pass from Tyrod Taylor (Dan Carpenter kick), 1:17. Jets 37–31. Drive: 10 plays, 75 yards, 2:45.

Top passers

- NYJ – Ryan Fitzpatrick – 24/34, 374 yards, TD
- BUF – Tyrod Taylor – 18/30, 297 yards, 3 TD

Top rushers

- NYJ – Matt Forte – 30 rushes, 100 yards, 3 TD
- BUF – LeSean McCoy – 15 rushes, 59 yards

Top receivers

- NYJ – Eric Decker – 6 receptions, 126 yards, TD
- BUF – Marquise Goodwin – 2 receptions, 112 yards, TD

The Bills saw the return of their red Color Rush uniforms from 2015 in this game. With the loss, not only did the Bills drop to 0–2, but head coach Rex Ryan fired offensive coordinator Greg Roman, promoting running backs coach Anthony Lynn to offensive coordinator the next day. They also lost wide receiver Greg Salas for the season to a groin injury and lost wide receiver Sammy Watkins for several weeks to a foot injury.

=== Week 3: vs. Arizona Cardinals ===
Week Three: Arizona Cardinals at Buffalo Bills

Quarter	1	2	3	4	Total
Cardinals	0	7	6	5	18
Bills	10	7	13	3	33

at New Era Field, Orchard Park, New York

- Date: September 25
- Game time: 1:00 p.m. EDT
- Game weather: 64 °F (18 °C), sunny
- Game attendance: 68,647
- Referee: Walt Anderson
- TV announcers (Fox): Kenny Albert, Daryl Johnston and Laura Okmin
- Recap, Game book

Game information

First quarter

- BUF – Dan Carpenter 19-yard field goal, 3:29. Bills 3–0. Drive: 7 plays, 77 yards, 3:51.
- BUF – LeSean McCoy 24-yard run (Dan Carpenter kick), 0:55. Bills 10–0. Drive: 5 plays, 53 yards, 1:30.

Second quarter

- BUF – LeSean McCoy 5-yard run (Dan Carpenter kick), 10:25. Bills 17–0. Drive: 6 plays, 52 yards, 2:51.
- ARI – David Johnson 4-yard run (Chandler Catanzaro kick), 1:05. Bills 17–7. Drive: 17 plays, 84 yards, 9:20.

Third quarter

- BUF – Tyrod Taylor 20-yard run (kick failed, wide right), 10:31. Bills 23–7. Drive: 6 plays, 47 yards, 2:49.
- BUF – Aaron Williams 53-yard fumble return (Dan Carpenter kick), 2:25. Bills 30–7.
- ARI – David Johnson 22-yard run (pass failed), 0:12. Bills 30–13. Drive: 6 plays, 83 yards, 2:13.

Fourth quarter

- ARI – Chandler Catanzaro 60-yard field goal, 10:36. Bills 30–16. Drive: 5 plays, 4 yards, 2:19.
- BUF – Dan Carpenter 45-yard field goal, 4:48. Bills 33–16. Drive: 4 plays, 3 yards, 1:42.
- ARI – LeSean McCoy tackled in the end zone by Corey Peters for a safety, 3:04. Bills 33–18.

Top passers

- ARI – Carson Palmer – 26/50, 287 yards, 4 INT
- BUF – Tyrod Taylor – 14/25, 119 yards, INT

Top rushers

- ARI – David Johnson – 19 rushes, 83 yards, 2 TD
- BUF – LeSean McCoy – 17 rushes, 110 yards, 2 TD

Top receivers

- ARI – John Brown – 6 receptions, 70 yards
- BUF – Robert Woods – 6 receptions, 51 yards

With the win, the Bills improved to 1–2 in Lynn's first game as offensive coordinator.

=== Week 4: at New England Patriots ===
Week Four: Buffalo Bills at New England Patriots

Quarter	1	2	3	4	Total
Bills	7	6	3	0	16
Patriots	0	0	0	0	0

at Gillette Stadium, Foxborough, Massachusetts

- Date: October 2
- Game time: 1:00 p.m. EDT
- Game weather: 56 °F (13 °C), cloudy
- Game attendance: 66,829
- Referee: Pete Morelli
- TV announcers (CBS): Ian Eagle, Dan Fouts and Evan Washburn
- Recap, Game book

Game information

First quarter

- BUF – LeSean McCoy 7-yard pass from Tyrod Taylor (Dan Carpenter kick), 5:31. Bills 7–0. Drive: 12 plays, 65 yards, 7:11.

Second quarter

- BUF – Dan Carpenter 34-yard field goal, 14:49. Bills 10–0. Drive: 10 plays, 52 yards, 3:58.
- BUF – Dan Carpenter 43-yard field goal, 7:46. Bills 13–0. Drive: 12 plays, 74 yards, 4:40.

Third quarter

- BUF – Dan Carpenter 44-yard field goal, 0:28. Bills 16–0. Drive: 11 plays, 44 yards, 4:27.

Fourth quarter

- No scoring plays

Top passers

- BUF – Tyrod Taylor – 27/39, 246 yards, TD
- NE – Jacoby Brissett – 17/27, 205 yards

Top rushers

- BUF – LeSean McCoy – 19 rushes, 70 yards
- NE – LeGarrette Blount – 13 rushes, 54 yards

Top receivers

- BUF – Robert Woods – 7 receptions, 89 yards
- NE – Martellus Bennett – 5 receptions, 109 yards

With the win, not only did the Bills improve to 2–2, but Ryan got his first career regular season victory at Gillette Stadium (he was 0–7 as head coach entering the game, including six straight losses as New York Jets head coach).

=== Week 5: at Los Angeles Rams ===
Week Five: Buffalo Bills at Los Angeles Rams

Quarter	1	2	3	4	Total
Bills	7	9	7	7	30
Rams	3	10	3	3	19

at Los Angeles Memorial Coliseum, Los Angeles, California

- Date: October 9
- Game time: 4:25 p.m. EDT/1:25 p.m. PDT
- Game weather: 91 °F (33 °C), sunny
- Game attendance: 83,679
- Referee: Walt Coleman
- TV announcers (CBS): Kevin Harlan, Rich Gannon and Scott Kaplan
- Recap, Game book

Game information

First quarter

- LA – Greg Zuerlein 37-yard field goal, 9:31. Rams 3–0. Drive: 12 plays, 60 yards, 5:29.
- BUF – Justin Hunter 4-yard pass from Tyrod Taylor (Dan Carpenter kick), 2:22. Bills 7–3. Drive: 12 plays, 76 yards, 7:09.

Second quarter

- BUF – Mike Gillislee 5-yard run (kick blocked), 13:59. Bills 13–3. Drive: 2 plays, 63 yards, 1:01.
- LA – Greg Zuerlein 32-yard field goal, 7:46. Bills 13–6. Drive: 5 plays, 52 yards, 2:33.
- LA – Todd Gurley 1-yard run (Greg Zuerlein kick), 1:56. Tied 13–13. Drive: 8 plays, 64 yards, 4:39.
- BUF – Dan Carpenter 23-yard field goal, 0:00. Bills 16–13. Drive: 10 plays, 70 yards, 1:56.

Third quarter

- LA – Greg Zuerlein 54-yard field goal, 8:05. Tied 16–16. Drive: 9 plays, 48 yards, 5:13.
- BUF – Nickell Robey-Coleman 41-yard interception return (Dan Carpenter kick), 3:54. Bills 23–16.

Fourth quarter

- LA – Greg Zuerlein 22-yard field goal, 5:51. Bills 23–19. Drive: 13 plays, 89 yards, 8:16.
- BUF – Marquise Goodwin 6-yard pass from Tyrod Taylor (Dan Carpenter kick), 2:37. Bills 30–19. Drive: 3 plays, 25 yards, 1:04.

Top passers

- BUF – Tyrod Taylor – 12/23, 124 yards, 2 TD
- LA – Case Keenum – 21/31, 271 yards, 2 INT

Top rushers

- BUF – LeSean McCoy – 18 rushes, 150 yards
- LA – Todd Gurley – 23 rushes, 72 yards, TD

Top receivers

- BUF – Charles Clay – 5 receptions, 73 yards
- LA – Kenny Britt – 5 receptions, 75 yards

With the win, the Bills improve to 3–2 and their first three-game winning streak since 2011 (the team started that season 3–0).

=== Week 6: vs. San Francisco 49ers ===
Week Six: San Francisco 49ers at Buffalo Bills

Quarter	1	2	3	4	Total
49ers	3	10	0	3	16
Bills	7	10	7	21	45

at New Era Field, Orchard Park, New York

- Date: October 16
- Game time: 1:00 p.m. EDT
- Game weather: 72 °F (22 °C), mostly cloudy
- Game attendance: 70,003
- Referee: Gene Steratore
- TV announcers (Fox): Dick Stockton, David Diehl and Kristina Pink
- Recap, Game book

Game information

First quarter

- SF – Phil Dawson 33-yard field goal, 5:43. 49ers 3–0. Drive: 7 plays, 13 yards, 3:53.
- BUF – LeSean McCoy 4-yard run (Dan Carpenter kick), 0:14. Bills 7–3. Drive: 11 plays, 75 yards, 5:29.

Second quarter

- SF – Torrey Smith 53-yard pass from Colin Kaepernick (Phil Dawson kick), 13:56. 49ers 10–7. Drive: 4 plays, 75 yards, 1:18.
- BUF – LeSean McCoy 12-yard run (Dan Carpenter kick), 10:18. Bills 14–10. Drive: 7 plays, 75 yards, 3:38.
- SF – Phil Dawson 48-yard field goal, 5:54. Bills 14–13. Drive: 9 plays, 59 yards, 4:24.
- BUF – Dan Carpenter 40-yard field goal, 0:21. Bills 17–13. Drive: 14 plays, 53 yards, 5:33.

Third quarter

- BUF – Justin Hunter 30-yard pass from Tyrod Taylor (Dan Carpenter kick), 2:34. Bills 24–13. Drive: 4 plays, 60 yards, 1:55.

Fourth quarter

- SF – Phil Dawson 47-yard field goal, 14:48. Bills 24–16. Drive: 8 plays, 46 yards, 2:46.
- BUF – LeSean McCoy 18-yard run (Dan Carpenter kick), 10:53. Bills 31–16. Drive: 8 plays, 75 yards, 3:55.
- BUF – Robert Woods 5-yard pass from Tyrod Taylor (Dan Carpenter kick), 10:32. Bills 38–16. Drive: 1 play, 27 yards, 0:11.
- BUF – Mike Gillislee 44-yard run (Dan Carpenter kick), 5:40. Bills 45–16. Drive: 7 plays, 73 yards, 3:25.

Top passers

- SF – Colin Kaepernick – 13/29, 187 yards, TD
- BUF – Tyrod Taylor – 16/25, 179 yards, 2 TD

Top rushers

- SF – Colin Kaepernick – 8 rushes, 66 yards
- BUF – LeSean McCoy – 19 rushes, 140 yards, 3 TD

Top receivers

- SF – Torrey Smith – 3 receptions, 76 yards, TD
- BUF – Charles Clay – 5 receptions, 52 yards

With the win, the Bills improve to 4–2 and their first four-game winning streak since 2008 (the team started that season 4–0 in Dick Jauron's last full season as head coach).

=== Week 7: at Miami Dolphins ===
Week Seven: Buffalo Bills at Miami Dolphins

Quarter	1	2	3	4	Total
Bills	3	7	7	8	25
Dolphins	3	3	8	14	28

at Hard Rock Stadium, Miami Gardens, Florida

- Date: October 23
- Game time: 1:00 p.m. EDT
- Game weather: 81 °F (27 °C), partly sunny
- Game attendance: 65,658
- Referee: Brad Allen
- TV announcers (CBS): Tom McCarthy, Adam Archuleta and Kevin Manuel
- Recap, Game book

Game information

First quarter

- MIA – Andrew Franks 36-yard field goal, 7:28. Dolphins 3–0. Drive: 15 plays, 64 yards, 7:32.
- BUF – Dan Carpenter 29-yard field goal, 0:49. Tied 3–3. Drive: 6 plays, 20 yards, 1:59.

Second quarter

- BUF – Tyrod Taylor 10-yard run (Dan Carpenter kick), 11:47. Bills 10–3. Drive: 7 plays, 40 yards, 2:50.
- MIA – Andrew Franks 33-yard field goal, 3:47. Bills 10–6. Drive: 12 plays, 58 yards, 8:00.

Third quarter

- BUF – Marquise Goodwin 67-yard pass from Tyrod Taylor (Dan Carpenter kick), 5:51. Bills 17–6. Drive: 1 play, 67 yards, 0:09.
- MIA – Jay Ajayi 4-yard run (Ryan Tannehill–Jarvis Landry pass), 0:18. Bills 17–14. Drive: 10 plays, 75 yards, 5:33.

Fourth quarter

- MIA – Damien Williams 12-yard run (Andrew Franks kick), 3:56. Dolphins 21–17. Drive: 6 plays, 64 yards, 3:49.
- MIA – Kenny Stills 66-yard pass from Ryan Tannehill (Andrew Franks kick), 2:24. Dolphins 28–17. Drive: 3 plays, 70 yards, 1:03.
- BUF – Reggie Bush 1-yard run (Tyrod Taylor–Reggie Bush pass), 0:14. Dolphins 28–25. Drive: 13 plays, 75 yards, 2:10.

Top passers

- BUF – Tyrod Taylor – 14/28, 221 yards, TD
- MIA – Ryan Tannehill – 15/25, 204 yards, TD

Top rushers

- BUF – Tyrod Taylor – 7 rushes, 35 yards, TD
- MIA – Jay Ajayi – 28 rushes, 214 yards, TD

Top receivers

- BUF – Marquise Goodwin – 4 receptions, 93 yards, TD
- MIA – Kenny Stills – 5 receptions, 100 yards, TD

The Bills led 17–14 by the start of the fourth quarter, but the Dolphins came back to win 28–25, causing the Bills to drop to 4–3.

=== Week 8: vs. New England Patriots ===
Week Eight: New England Patriots at Buffalo Bills

Quarter	1	2	3	4	Total
Patriots	14	10	14	3	41
Bills	3	7	7	8	25

at New Era Field, Orchard Park, New York

- Date: October 30
- Game time: 1:00 p.m. EDT
- Game weather: 49 °F (9 °C), rain
- Game attendance: 70,442
- Referee: John Parry
- TV announcers (CBS): Ian Eagle, Dan Fouts and Evan Washburn
- Recap, Game book

Game information

First quarter

- BUF – Dan Carpenter 23-yard field goal, 11:07. Bills 3–0. Drive: 10 plays, 70 yards, 3:55.
- NE – Danny Amendola 9-yard pass from Tom Brady (Stephen Gostkowski kick), 4:35. Patriots 7–3. Drive 14 plays, 70 yards, 6:30.
- NE – Chris Hogan 53-yard pass from Tom Brady (Stephen Gostkowski kick), 1:41. Patriots 14–3. Drive: 3 plays, 45 yards, 2:08.

Second quarter

- BUF – Mike Gillislee 3-yard run (Dan Carpenter kick), 6:26. Patriots 14–10. Drive: 5 plays, 59 yards, 2:14.
- NE – Rob Gronkowski 53-yard pass from Tom Brady (Stephen Gostkowski kick), 4:18. Patriots 21–10. Drive: 4 plays, 79 yards, 2:08.
- NE – Stephen Gostkowski 51-yard field goal, 0:03. Patriots 24–10. Drive: 5 plays, 28 yards, 0:27.

Third quarter

- NE – Julian Edelman 12-yard pass from Tom Brady (Stephen Gostkowski kick), 14:00. Patriots 31–10. Drive: 2 plays, 24 yards, 1:00.
- BUF – Tyrod Taylor 26-yard run (Dan Carpenter kick), 7:57. Patriots 31–17. Drive: 13 plays, 75 yards, 6:03.
- NE – LeGarrette Blount 1-yard run (Stephen Gostkowski kick), 7:10. Patriots 38–17. Drive: 12 plays, 75 yards, 4:52.

Fourth quarter

- NE – Stephen Gostkowski 32-yard field goal, 7:10. Patriots 41–17. Drive: 13 plays, 76 yards, 4:52.
- BUF – Jonathan Williams (EJ Manuel–Nick O'Leary pass), 0:33. Patriots 41–25. Drive: 6 plays, 66 yards, 1:56.

Top passers

- NE – Tom Brady – 22/33, 315 yards, 4 TD
- BUF – Tyrod Taylor – 19/38, 183 yards

Top rushers

- NE – LeGarrette Blount – 18 rushes, 43 yards, TD
- BUF – Mike Gillislee – 12 rushes, 85 yards, TD

Top receivers

- NE – Rob Gronkowski – 5 receptions, 109 yards, TD
- BUF – Walt Powell – 3 receptions, 59 yards

=== Week 9: at Seattle Seahawks ===
Week Nine: Buffalo Bills at Seattle Seahawks

Quarter	1	2	3	4	Total
Bills	14	3	0	8	25
Seahawks	7	21	0	3	31

at CenturyLink Field, Seattle, Washington

- Date: November 7
- Game time: 8:25 p.m. ET/5:25 p.m. PT
- Game weather: 61 °F (16 °C), cloudy
- Game attendance: 69,084
- Referee: Walt Anderson
- TV announcers (ESPN): Sean McDonough, Jon Gruden and Lisa Salters
- Recap, Game book

Game information

First quarter

- BUF – Tyrod Taylor 3-yard run (Dan Carpenter kick), 13:32. Bills 7–0. Drive: 1 play, 3 yards, 0:04.
- SEA – Russell Wilson 3-yard run (Steven Hauschka kick), 12:21. Tied 7–7. Drive: 3 plays, 58 yards, 1:11.
- BUF – Justin Hunter 5-yard pass from Tyrod Taylor (Dan Carpenter kick), 2:21. Bills 14–7. Drive: 17 plays, 75 yards, 10:00.

Second quarter

- SEA – Jimmy Graham 17-yard pass from Russell Wilson (Steven Hauschka kick), 14:54. Tied 14–14. Drive: 5 plays, 65 yards, 2:27.
- BUF – Dan Carpenter 31-yard field goal, 9:32. Bills 17–14. Drive: 12 plays, 62 yards, 5:22.
- SEA – Christine Michael 3-yard run (Steven Hauschka kick), 4:29. Seahawks 21–17. Drive: 3 plays, 40 yards, 1:42.
- SEA – Jimmy Graham 18-yard pass from Russell Wilson (Steven Hauschka kick), 1:00. Seahawks 28–17. Drive: 6 plays, 68 yards, 1:19.

Third quarter

- No scoring plays

Fourth quarter

- BUF – Mike Gillislee 1-yard run (Tyrod Taylor run), 14:26. Seahawks 28–25. Drive: 13 plays, 82 yards, 6:49.
- SEA – Steven Hauschka 49-yard field goal, 9:49. Seahawks 31–25. Drive: 8 plays, 44 yards, 4:37.

Top passers

- BUF – Tyrod Taylor – 27/38, 289 yards, TD, INT
- SEA – Russell Wilson – 20/26, 282 yards, 2 TD

Top rushers

- BUF – LeSean McCoy – 21 rushes, 85 yards
- SEA – Tyler Lockett – 1 rush, 13 yards

Top receivers

- BUF – Robert Woods – 10 receptions, 162 yards
- SEA – Jimmy Graham – 8 receptions, 103 yards, 2 TD

With the loss, not only did the Bills drop to 4–5, but they also lost center Eric Wood for the season.

=== Week 11: at Cincinnati Bengals ===
Week Eleven: Buffalo Bills at Cincinnati Bengals

Quarter	1	2	3	4	Total
Bills	7	3	3	3	16
Bengals	6	6	0	0	12

at Paul Brown Stadium, Cincinnati, Ohio

- Date: November 20
- Game time: 1:00 p.m. ET
- Game weather: 36 °F (2 °C), partly cloudy
- Game attendance: 61,356
- Referee: Terry McAulay
- TV announcers (Fox): Thom Brennaman, Charles Davis, Chris Spielman and Peter Schrager
- Recap, Game book

Game information

First quarter

- BUF – LeSean McCoy 7-yard run (Dan Carpenter kick), 8:52. Bills 7–0. Drive: 8 plays, 75 yards, 4:23.
- CIN – Andy Dalton 2-yard run (kick failed, hit right upright), 2:34. Bills 7–6. Drive: 13 plays, 75 yards, 6:18.

Second quarter

- BUF – Dan Carpenter 26-yard field goal, 9:03. Bills 10–6. Drive: 4 plays, −5 yards, 2:05.
- CIN – Tyler Boyd 1-yard pass from Andy Dalton (kick failed, hit right upright), 3:10. Bengals 12–10. Drive: 13 plays, 66 yards, 5:53.

Third quarter

- BUF – Dan Carpenter 54-yard field goal, 10:25. Bills 13–12. Drive: 8 plays, 32 yards, 4:35.

Fourth quarter

- BUF – Dan Carpenter 20-yard field goal, 12:05. Bills 16–12. Drive: 15 plays, 88 yards, 8:12.

Top passers

- BUF – Tyrod Taylor – 19/27, 166 yards, INT
- CIN – Andy Dalton – 24/43, 207 yards, TD, 2 INT

Top rushers

- BUF – Mike Gillislee – 14 rushes, 72 yards
- CIN – Jeremy Hill – 16 rushes, 62 yards

Top receivers

- BUF – Brandon Tate – 2 receptions, 48 yards
- CIN – Tyler Boyd – 6 receptions, 54 yards, TD

With the win, the Bills improved to 5–5, but running back LeSean McCoy, wide receiver Robert Woods and safety Robert Blanton left the game with injuries.

=== Week 12: vs. Jacksonville Jaguars ===
Week Twelve: Jacksonville Jaguars at Buffalo Bills

Quarter	1	2	3	4	Total
Jaguars	7	0	7	7	21
Bills	0	6	14	8	28

at New Era Field, Orchard Park, New York

- Date: November 27
- Game time: 1:00 p.m. ET
- Game weather: 42 °F (6 °C), mostly cloudy
- Game attendance: 67,849
- Referee: Tony Corrente
- TV announcers (CBS): Andrew Catalon, Steve Beuerlein and Steve Tasker
- Recap, Game book

Game information

First quarter

- JAX – Chris Ivory 2-yard run (Jason Myers kick), 8:15. Jaguars 7–0. Drive: 11 plays, 75 yards, 6:45.

Second quarter

- BUF – LeSean McCoy 7-yard run (kick failed, wide left), 0:20. Jaguars 7–6. Drive: 5 plays, 22 yards, 1:04.

Third quarter

- BUF – LeSean McCoy 75-yard run (Dan Carpenter kick), 14:47. Bills 7–13. Drive: 1 play, 75 yards, 0:13.
- JAX – Marqise Lee 20-yard pass from Blake Bortles (Jason Myers kick), 9:26. Jaguars 14–13. Drive: 11 plays, 65 yards, 5:21.
- BUF – Tyrod Taylor 7-yard run (Dan Carpenter kick), 3:00. Bills 20–14. Drive: 4 plays, 75 yards, 1:34.

Fourth quarter

- JAX – Allen Hurns 12-yard pass from Blake Bortles (Jason Myers kick), 14:52. Jaguars 21–20. Drive: 7 plays, 65 yards, 3:08.
- BUF – Justin Hunter 16-yard pass from Tyrod Taylor (LeSean McCoy run), 10:46. Bills 28–21. Drive: 8 plays, 76 yards, 4:06.

Top passers

- JAX – Blake Bortles – 13/26, 126 yards, 2 TD
- BUF – Tyrod Taylor – 12/18, 166 yards, TD

Top rushers

- JAX – Blake Bortles – 8 rushes, 81 yards
- BUF – LeSean McCoy – 19 rushes, 103 yards, 2 TD

Top receivers

- JAX – Marqise Lee – 3 receptions, 37 yards, TD
- BUF – Sammy Watkins – 3 receptions, 80 yards

With the win, the Bills improved to 6–5, but defensive tackle Corbin Bryant and wide receiver Walt Powell had to miss the rest of the season.

=== Week 13: at Oakland Raiders ===
Week Thirteen: Buffalo Bills at Oakland Raiders

Quarter	1	2	3	4	Total
Bills	3	7	14	0	24
Raiders	3	6	14	15	38

at Oakland Alameda Coliseum, Oakland, California

- Date: December 4
- Game time: 4:05 p.m. ET/1:05 p.m. PT
- Game weather: 59 °F (15 °C), partly cloudy
- Game attendance: 54,759
- Referee: Bill Vinovich
- TV announcers (CBS): Ian Eagle, Dan Fouts and Evan Washburn
- Recap, Game book

Game information

First quarter

- BUF – Dan Carpenter 27-yard field goal, 8:02. Bills 3–0. Drive: 10 plays, 72 yards, 4:10.
- OAK – Sebastian Janikowski 47-yard field goal, 4:35. Tied 3–3. Drive: 8 plays, 46 yards, 3:27.

Second quarter

- BUF – Mike Gillislee 1-yard run (Dan Carpenter kick), 13:28. Bills 10–3. Drive: 11 plays, 80 yards, 6:07.
- OAK – Sebastian Janikowski 41-yard field goal, 2:56. Bills 10–6. Drive: 11 plays, 38 yards, 4:24.
- OAK – Sebastian Janikowski 47-yard field goal, 0:00. Bills 10–9. Drive: 5 plays, 57 yards, 0:30.

Third quarter

- BUF – Tyrod Taylor 12-yard run (Dan Carpenter kick), 14:03. Bills 17–9. Drive: 2 plays, 66 yards, 0:57.
- BUF – Mike Gillislee 2-yard run (Dan Carpenter kick), 9:01. Bills 24–9. Drive: 10 plays, 54 yards, 4:10.
- OAK – Michael Crabtree 3-yard pass from Derek Carr (Sebastian Janikowski kick), 5:17. Bills 24–16. Drive: 9 plays, 75 yards, 3:44.
- OAK – Latavius Murray 1-yard run (Sebastian Janikowski kick), 0:57. Bills 24–23. Drive: 5 plays, 38 yards, 3:03.

Fourth quarter

- OAK – Amari Cooper 37-yard pass from Derek Carr (Sebastian Janikowski kick), 14:08. Raiders 30–24. Drive: 5 plays, 59 yards, 0:40.
- OAK – Latavius Murray 1-yard run (Derek Carr–Seth Roberts pass), 8:34. Raiders 38–24. Drive: 4 plays, 16 yards, 2:11.

Top passers

- BUF – Tyrod Taylor – 18/35, 191 yards, INT
- OAK – Derek Carr – 19/35, 260 yards, 2 TD

Top rushers

- BUF – LeSean McCoy – 17 rushes, 130 yards
- OAK – Latavius Murray – 20 rushes, 82 yards, 2 TD

Top receivers

- BUF – LeSean McCoy – 7 receptions, 61 yards
- OAK – Michael Crabtree – 7 receptions, 74 yards, TD

With the loss, the Bills dropped to 6–6.

=== Week 14: vs. Pittsburgh Steelers ===
Week Fourteen: Pittsburgh Steelers at Buffalo Bills

Quarter	1	2	3	4	Total
Steelers	7	7	7	6	27
Bills	0	7	0	13	20

at New Era Field, Orchard Park, New York

- Date: December 11
- Game time: 1:00 p.m. ET
- Game weather: 27 °F (−3 °C), snow showers
- Game attendance: 69,657
- Referee: Pete Morelli
- TV announcers (CBS): Jim Nantz, Phil Simms and Tracy Wolfson
- Recap, Game book

Game information

First quarter

- PIT – Le'Veon Bell 3-yard run (Chris Boswell kick), 6:00. Steelers 7–0. Drive: 8 plays, 71 yards, 3:06.

Second quarter

- PIT – Le'Veon Bell 7-yard run (Chris Boswell kick), 12:00. Steelers 14–0. Drive: 10 plays, 61 yards, 5:14.
- BUF – Sammy Watkins 8-yard pass from Tyrod Taylor (Dan Carpenter kick), 7:07. Steelers 14–7. Drive: 3 plays, 7 yards, 1:27.

Third quarter

- PIT – Le'Veon Bell 5-yard run (Chris Boswell kick), 5:28. Steelers 21–7. Drive: 10 plays, 82 yards, 6:33.

Fourth quarter

- PIT – Chris Boswell 37-yard field goal, 9:57. Steelers 24–7. Drive: 6 plays, 29 yards, 3:34.
- BUF – Charles Clay 40-yard pass from Tyrod Taylor (kick failed, hit left upright), 7:27. Steelers 24–13. Drive: 5 plays, 82 yards, 2:30.
- PIT – Chris Boswell 39-yard field goal, 3:38. Steelers 27–13. Drive: 9 plays, 54 yards, 3:49.
- BUF – LeSean McCoy 3-yard run (Dan Carpenter kick), 1:25. Steelers 27–20. Drive: 8 plays, 75 yards, 2:13.

Top passers

- PIT – Ben Roethlisberger – 17/31, 220 yards, 3 INT
- BUF – Tyrod Taylor – 15/25, 228 yards, 2 TD, INT

Top rushers

- PIT – Le'Veon Bell – 38 rushes, 236 yards, 3 TD
- BUF – Mike Gillislee – 2 rushes, 34 yards

Top receivers

- PIT – Antonio Brown – 5 receptions, 78 yards
- BUF – LeSean McCoy – 6 receptions, 81 yards

=== Week 15: vs. Cleveland Browns ===
Week Fifteen: Cleveland Browns at Buffalo Bills

Quarter	1	2	3	4	Total
Browns	3	0	10	0	13
Bills	10	7	7	9	33

at New Era Field, Orchard Park, New York

- Date: December 18
- Game time: 1:00 p.m. ET
- Game weather: 25 °F (−4 °C), cloudy
- Game attendance: 66,529
- Referee: Clete Blakeman
- TV announcers (CBS): Tom McCarthy and Adam Archuleta
- Recap, Game book

Game information

First quarter

- BUF – Dan Carpenter 21-yard field goal, 10:14. Bills 3–0. Drive: 7 plays, 44 yards, 3:06.
- CLE – Cody Parkey 35-yard field goal, 3:50. Tied 3–3. Drive: 12 plays, 63 yards, 6:24.
- BUF – Mike Gillislee 3-yard run (Dan Carpenter kick), 0:00. Bills 10–3. Drive: 8 plays, 74 yards, 3:50.

Second quarter

- BUF – Charles Clay 19-yard pass from Tyrod Taylor (Dan Carpenter kick), 0:34. Bills 17–3. Drive: 13 plays, 91 yards, 7:29.

Third quarter

- CLE – Robert Griffin III 18-yard run (Cody Parkey kick), 8:58. Bills 17–10. Drive: 8 plays, 80 yards, 3:54.
- BUF – LeSean McCoy 3-yard run (Dan Carpenter kick), 5:50. Bills 24–10. Drive: 6 plays, 75 yards, 3:08.
- CLE – Cody Parkey 40-yard field goal, 1:32. Bills 24–13. Drive: 8 plays, 45 yards, 4:18.

Fourth quarter

- BUF – LeSean McCoy 8-yard run (kick failed, wide right), 12:38. Bills 30–13. Drive: 8 plays, 75 yards, 3:54.
- BUF – Dan Carpenter 34-yard field goal, 7:21. Bills 33–13. Drive: 7 plays, 34 yards, 4:00.

Top passers

- CLE – Robert Griffin III – 17/28, 196 yards
- BUF – Tyrod Taylor – 17/24, 174 yards, TD

Top rushers

- CLE – Robert Griffin III – 8 rushes, 48 yards, TD
- BUF – LeSean McCoy – 19 rushes, 153 yards, 2 TD

Top receivers

- CLE – Duke Johnson – 5 receptions, 62 yards
- BUF – Charles Clay – 7 receptions, 72 yards, TD

With the win, the Bills improved to 7–7 and keep their slim playoff chances alive. The team set a new franchise record for rushing touchdowns in a season (27) with LeSean McCoy's second rushing score of the game. This was also the 400th regular-season win in franchise history.

=== Week 16: vs. Miami Dolphins ===
Week Sixteen: Miami Dolphins at Buffalo Bills

Quarter	1	2	3	4	OT	Total
Dolphins	7	7	14	3	3	34
Bills	0	7	14	10	0	31

at New Era Field, Orchard Park, New York

- Date: December 24
- Game time: 1:00 p.m. ET
- Game weather: 38 °F (3 °C), cloudy
- Game attendance: 64,690
- Referee: Craig Wrolstad
- TV announcers (CBS): Greg Gumbel, Trent Green and Jamie Erdahl
- Recap, Game book

Game information

First quarter

- MIA – Jay Ajayi 2-yard run (Andrew Franks kick), 6:24. Dolphins 7–0. Drive: 9 plays, 72 yards, 4:13.

Second quarter

- MIA – Kenyan Drake 45-yard run (Andrew Franks kick), 13:34. Dolphins 14–0. Drive: 4 plays, 64 yards, 1:55.
- BUF – Sammy Watkins 38-yard pass from Tyrod Taylor (Dan Carpenter kick), 5:06. Dolphins 14–7. Drive: 6 plays, 79 yards, 2:45.

Third quarter

- MIA – DeVante Parker 56-yard pass from Matt Moore (Andrew Franks kick), 12:05. Dolphins 21–7. Drive: 5 plays, 70 yards, 2:55.
- BUF – LeSean McCoy 19-yard run (Dan Carpenter kick), 6:46. Dolphins 21–14. Drive: 10 plays, 77 yards, 5:19.
- MIA – Kenny Stills 6-yard pass from Matt Moore (Andrew Franks kick), 3:14. Dolphins 28–14. Drive: 6 plays, 75 yards, 3:32.
- BUF – Charles Clay 18-yard pass from Tyrod Taylor (Dan Carpenter kick), 2:02. Dolphins 28–21. Drive: 4 plays, 78 yards, 2:02.

Fourth quarter

- BUF – Dan Carpenter 28-yard field goal, 5:51. Dolphins 28–24. Drive: 10 plays, 89 yards, 4:24.
- BUF – Charles Clay 7-yard pass from Tyrod Taylor (Dan Carpenter kick), 1:20. Bills 31–28. Drive: 10 plays, 89 yards, 2:40.
- MIA – Andrew Franks 55-yard field goal, 0:06. Tied 31–31. Drive: 6 plays, 24 yards, 1:14.

Overtime

- MIA – Andrew Franks 27-yard field goal, 0:47. Dolphins 34–31. Drive: 7 plays, 77 yards, 3:13.

Top passers

- MIA – Matt Moore – 16/30, 233 yards, 2 TD, INT
- BUF – Tyrod Taylor – 26/39, 329 yards, 3 TD

Top rushers

- MIA – Jay Ajayi – 32 rushes, 206 yards, TD
- BUF – LeSean McCoy – 24 rushes, 128 yards, TD

Top receivers

- MIA – DeVante Parker – 4 receptions, 85 yards, TD
- BUF – Charles Clay – 8 receptions, 85 yards, 2 TD

After the Bills took the lead with a touchdown inside the two-minute warning at the end of the fourth quarter, the Dolphins took the game to overtime with a 55-yard field goal with six seconds on the clock. They then secured the win with 47 seconds left in the extra period with another field goal from 27 yards. The loss for the Bills meant they were eliminated from playoff contention for the 17th consecutive season. Two days later, the Bills fired head coach Rex Ryan and assistant head coach Rob Ryan.

=== Week 17: at New York Jets ===
Week Seventeen: Buffalo Bills at New York Jets

Quarter	1	2	3	4	Total
Bills	0	3	0	7	10
Jets	0	10	10	10	30

at MetLife Stadium, East Rutherford, New Jersey

- Date: January 1, 2017
- Game time: 1:00 p.m. ET
- Game weather: 42 °F (6 °C), sunny
- Game attendance: 78,160
- Referee: Jeff Triplette
- TV announcers (CBS): Andrew Catalon, Steve Beuerlein and Steve Tasker
- Recap, Game book

Game information

First quarter

- No scoring plays

Second quarter

- NYJ – Bilal Powell 2-yard pass from Ryan Fitzpatrick (Nick Folk kick), 9:28. Jets 7–0. Drive: 7 plays, 75 yards, 4:34.
- BUF – Dan Carpenter 34-yard field goal, 1:45. Jets 7–3. Drive: 11 plays, 54 yards, 4:12.
- NYJ – Nick Folk 30-yard field goal, 0:00. Jets 10–3. Drive: 10 plays, 63 yards, 1:45.

Third quarter

- NYJ – Jalin Marshall 6-yard pass from Ryan Fitzpatrick (Nick Folk kick), 4:03. Jets 17–3. Drive: 3 plays, 13 yards, 1:28.
- NYJ – Nick Folk 36-yard field goal, 0:01. Jets 20–3. Drive: 5 plays, 14 yards, 2:35.

Fourth quarter

- NYJ – Nick Folk 25-yard field goal, 3:21. Jets 23–3. Drive: 4 plays, −4 yards, 1:42.
- NYJ – Doug Middleton kickoff recovery in the end zone (Nick Folk kick), 3:21. Jets 30–3. Drive: 0 plays, 0 yards, 0:00.
- BUF – Mike Gillislee 1-yard run (Dan Carpenter kick), 0:39. Jets 30–10. Drive: 5 plays, 71 yards, 2:42.

Top passers

- BUF – Cardale Jones – 6/11, 96 yards, INT
- NYJ – Ryan Fitzpatrick – 20/30, 210 yards, 2 TD

Top rushers

- BUF – Mike Gillislee – 15 rushes, 40 yards, TD
- NYJ – Bilal Powell – 22 rushes, 122 yards

Top receivers

- BUF – Justin Hunter – 1 reception, 64 yards
- NYJ – Quincy Enunwa – 5 receptions, 81 yards

Anthony Lynn served as interim head coach, and EJ Manuel made his first start of the season, though he was benched in the 4th quarter as Cardale Jones took over. With the loss, Buffalo ended the season 7–9. This game included a notable flaw on Bills' special teams during a botched kickoff play. Jets' kicker Nick Folk made the ball bounce inside the field, over the heads of Bills' special teamers and into the endzone, only to see the surrounding Bills' players miscommunicate and fail to secure the live ball; Jets' specialist Doug Middleton then fell on the ball inside the endzone, giving New York their last touchdown of the game.

== Standings ==
=== Division ===
AFC East
	W	L	T	PCT	DIV	CONF	PF	PA	STK
^{(1)} New England Patriots	14	2	0	.875	5–1	11–1	441	250	W7
^{(6)} Miami Dolphins	10	6	0	.625	4–2	7–5	363	380	L1
Buffalo Bills	7	9	0	.438	1–5	4–8	399	378	L2
New York Jets	5	11	0	.313	2–4	4–8	275	409	W1

=== Conference ===
AFC
#	Team	Division	W	L	T	PCT	DIV	CONF	SOS	SOV	STK
Division leaders
1	New England Patriots	East	14	2	0	.875	5–1	11–1	.439	.424	W7
2 (Note: Kansas City clinched the AFC West division over Oakland based on head-to-head sweep.)	Kansas City Chiefs	West	12	4	0	.750	6–0	9–3	.508	.479	W2
3	Pittsburgh Steelers	North	11	5	0	.688	5–1	9–3	.494	.423	W7
4 (Note: Houston clinched the AFC South division title over Tennessee based on record vs. division opponents.)	Houston Texans	South	9	7	0	.563	5–1	7–5	.502	.427	L1
Wild Cards
5	Oakland Raiders	West	12	4	0	.750	3–3	9–3	.504	.443	L1
6	Miami Dolphins	East	10	6	0	.625	4–2	7–5	.455	.341	L1
Did not qualify for the postseason
7 (Note: Tennessee finished ahead of Denver based on head-to-head victory.)	Tennessee Titans	South	9	7	0	.563	2–4	6–6	.465	.458	W1
8	Denver Broncos	West	9	7	0	.563	2–4	6–6	.549	.455	W1
9 (Note: Baltimore finished ahead of Indianapolis based on record vs. conference opponents.)	Baltimore Ravens	North	8	8	0	.500	4–2	7–5	.498	.363	L2
10	Indianapolis Colts	South	8	8	0	.500	3–3	5–7	.492	.406	W1
11	Buffalo Bills	East	7	9	0	.438	1–5	4–8	.482	.339	L2
12	Cincinnati Bengals	North	6	9	1	.406	3–3	5–7	.521	.333	W1
13 (Note: The New York Jets finished ahead of San Diego based record vs. common opponents — the Jets' cumulative record against Cleveland, Indianapolis, Kansas City and Miami was 1–4, while San Diego's cumulative record against the same four teams was 0–5.)	New York Jets	East	5	11	0	.313	2–4	4–8	.518	.313	W1
14	San Diego Chargers	West	5	11	0	.313	1–5	4–8	.543	.513	L5
15	Jacksonville Jaguars	South	3	13	0	.188	2–4	2–10	.527	.417	L1
16	Cleveland Browns	North	1	15	0	.063	0–6	1–11	.549	.313	L1
Tiebreakers (Note: When breaking ties for three or more teams under the NFL's rules, they are first broken within divisions, then comparing only the highest ranked remaining team from each division.)
