= Kyle Williams (defensive tackle) =

American football player and coach (born 1983)

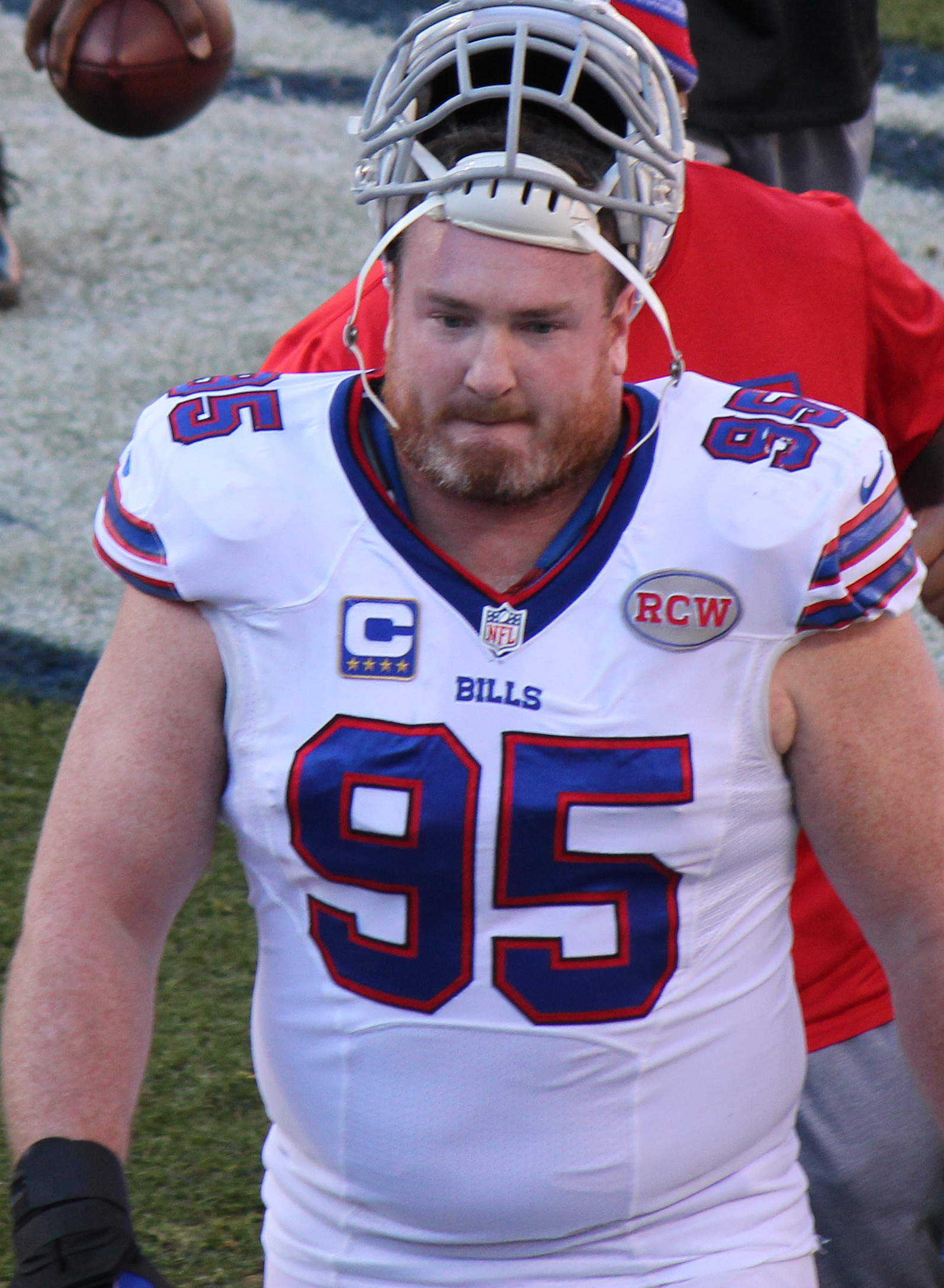
- Williams with the Buffalo Bills in 2014

Profile
- Position: Interior defensive line coach

Personal information
- Born: June 10, 1983 (age 43); Ruston, Louisiana, U.S.
- Listed height: 6 ft 1 in (1.85 m)
- Listed weight: 303 lb (137 kg)

Career information
- High school: Ruston
- College: LSU (2002–2005)
- NFL draft: 2006: 5th round, 134th overall pick

Career history

Playing
- Buffalo Bills (2006–2018)

Coaching
- LSU (2025) Defensive line coach

Awards and highlights
- Second-team All-Pro (2010); 6× Pro Bowl (2010, 2012–2014, 2016, 2018); BCS national champion (2003); Second-team All-American (2005); First-team All-SEC (2005); Second-team All-SEC (2004)

Career NFL statistics
- Total tackles: 609
- Sacks: 48.5
- Interceptions: 1
- Forced fumbles: 4
- Fumble recoveries: 6
- Stats at Pro Football Reference

Kyle Derrick Williams (born June 10, 1983) is an American college football coach and former professional football player who spent his entire 13-year career as a defensive tackle for the Buffalo Bills of the National Football League (NFL). He played college football for the LSU Tigers, and was selected by the Bills in the fifth round of the 2006 NFL draft, playing 13 seasons with them before retiring following the 2018 season.

At the time of his retirement, Williams ranked among the top players in Bills history in tackles and sacks and made six Pro Bowls. He was described by the Associated Press as "the heart and soul" of the Bills during his time there. Williams was hired as the defensive line coach for the LSU Tigers in 2025.

== Early life ==
Williams attended Ruston High School in Ruston, Louisiana, where he was a letterman in football, baseball, and track. In football, he was named 5A Louisiana Defensive MVP after recording 78 tackles, 17 for losses and 7 sacks as a senior. He was a member of the Baton Rouge Advocate Super Dozen and the New Orleans Times-Picayune Blue Chip Top 15 for Louisiana. He also was named MVP of district 1-5A in 2001. In track & field, Williams put the shot (53 ft,3 in) on the Ruston track team.

Williams was considered a four-star recruit by Rivals.com. He picked LSU over Auburn, Nebraska, Florida and Tennessee. Also in his freshman year of high school he ran for 942 yards and 14 touchdowns for the varsity.

== College career ==
Williams attended Louisiana State University, and played for the LSU Tigers football team from 2002 to 2005. He played in 46 games for the Tigers, starting 33 at defensive tackle. He finished his career with 16.5 quarterback sacks, 26 tackles for loss, and 140 total tackles. Williams best season came as a senior, where he recorded 61 tackles, 7.5 tackles for loss, and 4.5 sacks. He was named first-team All-American and second-team All-American by the Associated Press, Walter Camp Foundation, and College Football News.

== Professional career ==
Pre-draft measurables
Height	Weight	Arm length	Hand span	40-yard dash	10-yard split	20-yard split	20-yard shuttle	Three-cone drill	Vertical jump	Broad jump	Bench press
6 ft 1 1/4 in (1.86 m)	299 lb (136 kg)	30 5/8 in (0.78 m)	9 5/8 in (0.24 m)	4.99 s	1.73 s	2.88 s	4.52 s	7.43 s	27.5 in (0.70 m)	8 ft 3 in (2.51 m)	32 reps
All values from NFL Combine/LSU's Pro Day

=== 2006 ===
The Buffalo Bills drafted Williams in the fifth round (134th overall) of the 2006 NFL draft. Williams was the second defensive tackle drafted by the Buffalo Bills in 2006, behind first round pick John McCargo, and was the ninth defensive tackle drafted overall.

On July 23, 2006, the Buffalo Bills signed Williams to a three-year, $1.80 million contract that includes a signing bonus of $144,750.

Throughout training camp, Williams competed to be a starting defensive tackle against John McCargo and Tim Anderson. He also competed against Tim Anderson and LaWaylon Brown to be the starting nose tackle. Head coach Dick Jauron named Williams the backup defensive tackle to start the season, behind Larry Tripplett and Tim Anderson. Williams was also named the first-team nose tackle to start the season.

He made his professional regular season debut in the Buffalo Bills' season-opener at the New England Patriots and recorded six combined tackles in their 19–17 loss. On October 16, 2006, Williams earned his first career start after surpassing Tim Anderson on the depth chart and made five combined tackles during a 20–17 loss at the Detroit Lions. Defensive coordinator Perry Fewell named Williams the starting defensive tackle for the remainder of the season. In Week 17, he collected a season-high seven combined tackles in the Bills' 19–7 loss at the Baltimore Ravens. He completed his rookie season in 2006 with 53 combined tackles (33 solo) and a pass deflection in 16 games and 11 starts.

=== 2007 ===
Williams entered training camp slated as a starting defensive tackle, but saw minor competition from John McCargo and Tim Anderson. Head coach Dick Jauron named Williams and Larry Tripplett the starting defensive tackles to start the 2007 regular season. On October 28, 2007, Williams recorded four combined tackles and made his first career sack on quarterback Chad Pennington during a 13–3 victory at the New York Jets in Week 8. In Week 13, he collected a season-high six combined tackles and was credited with half a sack during a 17–16 win at the Washington Redskins. The following week, Williams recorded a season-high five solo tackles, an assisted tackle, and was credited with half a sack in the Bills' 38–17 victory against the Miami Dolphins in Week 14. Williams started all 16 games and recorded 41 combined tackles (28 solo) and two sacks.

=== 2008 ===
On July 3, 2008, the Buffalo Bills signed Williams to a three-year, $14.5 million contract extension that includes $5.70 million guaranteed and a signing bonus of $1.79 million.

Head coach Dick Jauron retained Williams as the starting defensive tackle entering the 2008 regular season, alongside Marcus Stroud and defensive ends Aaron Schobel and Chris Kelsay. In Week 2, he made five combined tackles and sacked quarterback David Garrard, to mark the third sack of his career, during a 20–16 win at the Jacksonville Jaguars. On December 28, 2008, Williams recorded a season-high six solo tackles and sacked quarterback Matt Cassel in the Bills' 13–0 loss to the New England Patriots in Week 17. He finished the season with 55 combined tackles (37 solo) and two sacks in 16 games and 16 starts.

=== 2009 ===
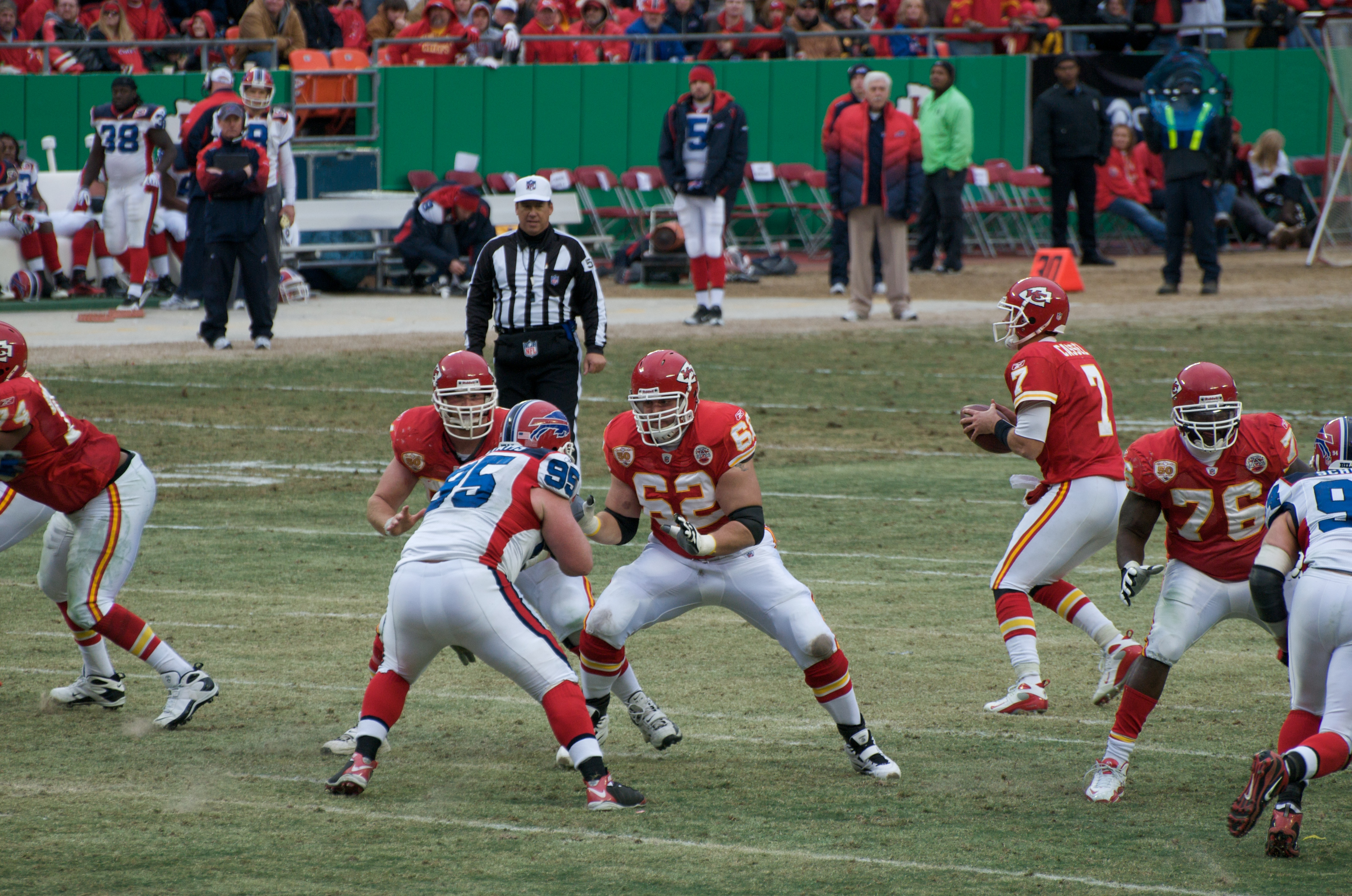
Williams playing against the Kansas City Chiefs in 2009

Head coach Dick Jauron retained the entire starting defensive line from the previous season, including Williams, Marcus Stroud, Chris Kelsay, and Aaron Schobel. He also retained duties as the first-team nose tackle.

On October 11, 2009, Williams collected a season-high ten combined tackles (seven solo) and sacked quarterback Derek Anderson in a 6–3 loss to the Cleveland Browns in Week 5. On October 25, 2009, Williams exited the Bills' 20–9 victory at the Carolina Panthers in the first quarter after sustaining a knee injury on the Bills' first defensive drive. He was subsequently sidelined for the next two games (Weeks 8–10) due to his injury. His injury ended his streak of 50 consecutive starts and 54 consecutive games. On November 18, 2009, the Buffalo Bills fired head coach Dick Jauron after they began the season with a 3–6 record. Defensive coordinator Perry Fewell was named the interim head coach for the remaining seven games. In Week 13, Williams made eight combined tackles and made two sacks on quarterback Mark Sanchez in the Bills' 19–13 loss to the New York Jets on Thursday Night Football. The game was held at the Rogers Centre in Toronto. On December 29, 2009, it was announced that Williams was selected to the 2010 Pro Bowl as an alternate for the AFC. Williams completed the 2009 season with 66 combined tackles (41 solo) and four sacks in 14 games and 14 starts.

=== 2010 ===
The Buffalo Bills' new defensive coordinator, George Edwards, chose to deploy a base 3-4 defense. The change prompted Williams to switch to nose tackle as his primary position. He entered training camp slated as the starting nose tackle, but saw minor competition from rookie Torell Troup. Head coach Chan Gailey named Williams the starting nose tackle to start the regular season, alongside defensive ends Marcus Stroud and Dwan Edwards.

On October 31, 2010, Williams recorded nine combined tackles and a season-high two sacks during a 13–10 loss at the Kansas City Chiefs. On November 28, 2010, he collected a season-high ten combined tackles (eight solo) and sacked quarterback Ben Roethlisberger twice in the Bills' 19–16 loss to the Pittsburgh Steelers in Week 12. Williams became widely recognized as a top defensive lineman and displayed dominant play throughout the season. Williams started in all 16 games in 2010 and finished with a career-high 77 combined tackles (54 solo), 5.5 sacks, and a pass deflection. On January 6, 2011, it was announced that Williams selected to play in the 2011 Pro Bowl as a replacement for Richard Seymour who was unable to participate due to a hamstring injury. Pro Football Focus named Williams the top defensive player of 2010.

=== 2011 ===
On August 26, 2011, the Buffalo Bills signed Williams to a six-year, $39 million contract extension that includes $17 million guaranteed and a $5 million signing bonus.

Williams remained the starting nose tackle in 2011, alongside defensive ends Dwan Edwards and Marcell Dareus. During training camp, Williams sustained a foot injury and was diagnosed with bone spurs. On September 18, 2011, Williams collected a season-high five combined tackles during a 38–35 victory against the Oakland Raiders. He was inactive for three games (Weeks 6–9) due to his recurring foot injury related to bone spurs. On November 8, 2011, the Buffalo Bills placed Williams on injured reserve due to an injury to his Achilles tendon. He finished the 2011 season with nine combined tackles (four solo) and a pass deflection in five games and five starts.

=== 2012 ===
On January 2, 2012, head coach Chan Gailey announced the decision to fire defensive coordinator George Edwards. Assistant head coach/inside linebackers coach Dave Wannstedt was named the defensive coordinator. Defensive coordinator Dave Wannstedt decided to install a traditional 4–3 base defense. Williams was moved to defensive tackle as his primary position and played nose tackle as his secondary position in 3–4 defensive alignments. Head coach Chan Gailey named Williams and Marcell Dareus the starting defensive tackles to begin the regular season, alongside defensive ends Mark Anderson and Mario Williams.

In Week 4, Williams recorded a season-high five combined tackles, a pass deflection, and was credited with had a sack during a 52–28 loss to the New England Patriots. On October 21, 2012, he tied his season-high of five combined tackles and a sack in the Bills' 35–34 loss to the Tennessee Titans. On December 31, 2012, the Buffalo Bills fired head coach Chan Gailey after the Bills finished with a 6–10 record and did not qualify for the playoffs for the third consecutive season. He started all 16 games and recorded 46 combined tackles (27 solo), five sacks, and two pass deflections. On January 21, 2013, Williams was added to the 2013 Pro Bowl as a replacement for Haloti Ngata who was unable to participate after reaching Super Bowl XLVII with the Baltimore Ravens.

=== 2013 ===
The Buffalo Bills hired Doug Marrone as their new head coach and Mike Pettine as their new defensive coordinator. As the coordinator, Pettine chose to implement a hybrid multi-front defense that used a 4–3 and 3–4 defensive concept. Williams continued to play both defensive tackle and nose tackle under Mike Pettine.

On October 27, 2013, Williams recorded a season-high nine combined tackles and was credited with 1.5 sacks during a 35–17 loss at the New Orleans Saints. In Week 11, Williams recorded three solo tackles and made a season-high two sacks on quarterback Geno Smith during a 37–14 victory against the New York Jets. In Week 16, he made five combined tackles and made a season-high two sacks in the Bills' 19–0 win against the Miami Dolphins. On December 27, 2013, it was announced that Williams was voted to the 2014 Pro Bowl. He finished the 2013 season with 68 combined tackles (42 solo), a career-high 10.5 sacks, and a pass deflection in 16 games and 16 starts. Under Pettine, the Buffalo Bills' defense finished fourth in passing defense and 28th in run defense.

=== 2014 ===
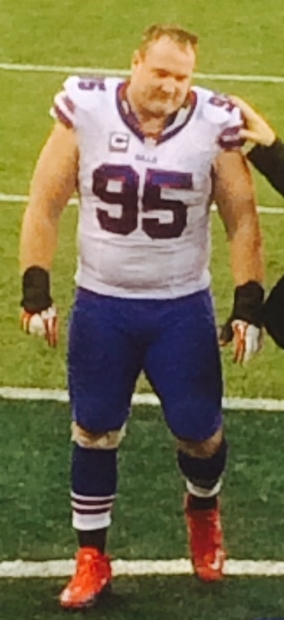
Williams in 2014

On January 24, 2014, it was announced that Mike Pettine had accepted the head coaching role with the Cleveland Browns. The following day, head coach Doug Marrone hired former Detroit Lions' head coach Jim Schwartz as the Bills' new defensive coordinator. Under Schwartz, the Buffalo Bills operated a multi-front defense that primarily used a base 4-3 defense. Schwartz also used a wide 9 technique with aggressive play calling and used minimal blitzing by only pass rushing with the defensive line. Williams primarily played defensive tackle under Schwartz and played nose tackle as his secondary position. Schwartz retained Williams and Marcell Dareus as the starting defensive tackles, along with defensive ends Mario Williams and Jerry Hughes.

He started in the Buffalo Bills' season-opener at the Chicago Bears and recorded a tackle, a pass deflection, and made his first career interception in their 23–20 overtime victory. Williams intercepted a pass by quarterback Jay Cutler, that was intended for tight end Martellus Bennett, and returned it two-yards before being horse collar tackled by wide receiver Brandon Marshall. The turnover and 15-yard penalty led to a game-tying field goal in the fourth quarter. Williams was inactive during a Week 5 victory at the Detroit Lions due to a knee injury. In Week 8, he collected two solo tackles and had a season-high two sacks during a 43–23 victory at the New York Jets. In Week 11, he collected a season-high five combined tackles during the Bills' 22–9 loss at the Miami Dolphins. On December 23, 2014, Williams was selected to the 2015 Pro Bowl. He finished the 2014 season with 41 combined tackles (33 solo), 5.5 sacks, three pass deflections, and an interception in 15 games and 15 starts. The Buffalo Bills defense greatly improved in 2014, finishing sixth in yards allowed, fifth in rushing yards, and first in sacks. On December 31, 2014, it was announced that head coach Doug Marrone chose to opt out of his contract. Williams ranked 72nd on the NFL Top 100 Players of 2015.

=== 2015 ===
On January 12, 2015, the Buffalo Bills hired former New York Jets' head coach Rex Ryan as their new head coach. Although Rex Ryan offered to retain Jim Schwartz as the defensive coordinator, Schwartz chose to decline, due to their difference in defensive schemes.

On March 11, 2015, the Buffalo Bills signed Williams to a one-year, $10.50 million contract with a signing bonus of $4.50 million. Ryan operated a base 3–4 defense and named Williams the backup nose tackle behind Marcell Dareus. Williams and Dareus were also named the starting defensive tackles.

In Week 5, Williams collected a season-high four combined tackles and a sack during a 14–13 victory at the Tennessee Titans. On October 18, 2015, Williams recorded one tackle before sustaining a knee injury and was carted off the field in the second quarter of a 34–21 loss to the Cincinnati Bengals in Week 6. His injury was initially suspected to be a sprained PCL. On November 27, 2015, it was reported that Williams would have to undergo surgery to repair his meniscus after his injury did not respond to initial treatments. On December 1, 2015, Williams was placed on injured reserve. Williams finished the 2015 season with 14 combined tackles (six solo) and a sack in six games and six starts.

=== 2016 ===
Throughout training camp, Williams competed for the role as the starting nose tackle against Marcell Dareus, Corbin Bryant, and Adolphus Washington. Head coach Rex Ryan named Williams the starting nose tackle to begin the regular season. Williams was also named a first-team defensive tackle, alongside Corbin Bryant, after Marcell Dareus was suspended for the first four games for violating the league's substance abuse policy.

In Week 3, Williams made four combined tackles and a season-high 1.5 sacks during a 33–18 victory against the Arizona Cardinals. On December 4, 2016, he collected a season-high nine combined tackles in the Bills' 38–24 loss at the Oakland Raiders. He was inactive for the Bills' Week 14 loss to the Pittsburgh Steelers due to a back injury. He finished the 2016 season with 64 combined tackles (42 solo) and five sacks in 15 games and 15 starts. On January 20, 2017, it was announced that Williams was added to the 2017 Pro Bowl as a late replacement for Ndamukong Suh, who was unable to play due to injury. This became his fifth Pro Bowl selection.

=== 2017 ===
After the firing of Rex Ryan the previous season, new head coach Sean McDermott hired Leslie Frazier as the Buffalo Bills' new defensive coordinator. Frazier implemented a base 4–3 defense, which required Williams to switch to defensive tackle as his primary position. Williams and Marcell Dareus were named the starting defensive tackles to begin the season, alongside defensive ends Jerry Hughes and Shaq Lawson.

On September 17, 2017, Williams recorded a season-high six combined tackles and a pass deflection during a 9–3 loss at the Carolina Panthers in Week 3. The following week, he had a season-high four solo tackles and a sack in the Bills' 26–16 win against the Denver Broncos in Week 2. On December 31, 2017, Williams recorded three tackles and scored his first career touchdown during a 22–16 victory at the Miami Dolphins. Williams lined up as a fullback and ran for a one-yard touchdown during the third quarter. Williams started all 16 games in 2017 and finished with 41 combined tackles (21 solo), three sacks, two pass deflections, and a touchdown.

The Buffalo Bills finished second in the AFC East with a 9–7 record and earned their first playoff berth since 1999. On January 7, 2018, Williams started in his first career playoff game and made one solo tackle in the Bills' 10–3 loss at the Jacksonville Jaguars in the AFC Wild Card Round.

=== 2018 ===
On March 13, 2018, the Buffalo Bills signed Williams to a one-year, $5.50 million contract that includes $4.50 million guaranteed and a signing bonus of $2.25 million.

On December 28, 2018, it was announced that Williams would be retiring after 13 seasons and his last NFL game would be on December 30, 2018, against the Miami Dolphins. In the game Williams made three tackles on defense, one for a loss. In what ended up being the final play of his NFL career, he lined up as an extra fullback on offense and caught a pass, advancing the ball nine yards. In another offensive play that game, Williams served as a lead blocker on a Josh Allen touchdown run. After the season, Williams was named to his sixth Pro Bowl, replacing an injured Jurrell Casey. In his final season, he started in all 16 regular season games and had five sacks, 35 total tackles, one pass defended, and one forced fumble.

Williams's last appearance in an NFL uniform was in the 2019 Pro Bowl game after being selected as an alternate for that game.

== Coaching career ==
Williams was hired as the defensive line coach at Louisiana State University on March 6, 2025 after serving as the defensive coordinator for Ruston High School from 2020 to 2024. He returned to Ruston High School for the 2026 season as the assistant head coach.

== NFL career statistics ==
Legend
Bold	Career high

=== Regular season ===
Year	Team	Games		Tackles					Interceptions					Fumbles			
Year	Team	GP	GS	Cmb	Solo	Ast	Sck	TFL	Int	Yds	TD	Lng	PD	FF	FR	Yds	TD
2006	BUF	**16**	11	53	33	20	0.0	4	0	0	0	0	0	0	0	0	0
2007	BUF	**16**	**16**	41	28	13	2.0	8	0	0	0	0	0	0	1	0	0
2008	BUF	**16**	**16**	55	37	18	2.0	6	0	0	0	0	0	**1**	0	0	0
2009	BUF	14	14	66	41	25	4.0	14	0	0	0	0	0	**1**	0	0	0
2010	BUF	**16**	**16**	**76**	**54**	22	5.5	**16**	0	0	0	0	1	0	**2**	**11**	0
2011	BUF	5	5	9	4	5	0.0	1	0	0	0	0	1	0	0	0	0
2012	BUF	**16**	**16**	46	27	19	5.0	10	0	0	0	0	2	0	0	0	0
2013	BUF	**16**	**16**	68	42	**26**	**10.5**	14	0	0	0	0	1	**1**	1	0	0
2014	BUF	15	15	41	30	11	5.5	8	**1**	**2**	0	**2**	**3**	0	0	0	0
2015	BUF	6	6	14	6	8	1.0	2	0	0	0	0	0	0	0	0	0
2016	BUF	15	15	64	42	22	5.0	11	0	0	0	0	0	0	0	0	0
2017	BUF	**16**	**16**	41	21	20	3.0	3	0	0	0	0	2	0	1	0	0
2018	BUF	**16**	**16**	35	22	13	5.0	6	0	0	0	0	1	**1**	1	0	0
Career		183	178	609	387	222	48.5	103	1	2	0	2	11	4	6	11	0

=== Playoffs ===
Year	Team	Games		Tackles					Interceptions					Fumbles			
Year	Team	GP	GS	Cmb	Solo	Ast	Sck	TFL	Int	Yds	TD	Lng	PD	FF	FR	Yds	TD
2017	BUF	**1**	**1**	**1**	**1**	0	0.0	0	0	0	0	0	0	0	0	0	0
Career		1	1	1	1	0	0.0	0	0	0	0	0	0	0	0	0	0

== Awards and honors ==
- Second-team All-SEC (2004)
- SEC Defensive Player of the Week (vs. Alabama, November 14, 2005)
- Second-team All-SEC by Coaches (2005)
- First-team All-SEC by Associated Press (2005)
- Second-team All-American by Associated Press, Walter Camp Foundation, Collegefootballnews.com (2005)
- First-team All-American by Rivals.com (2005)
- 6× Pro Bowl (2010, 2012, 2013, 2014, 2016, 2018)
- 2× NFL Top 100 — 32nd (2014), 72nd (2015)

== Personal life ==
In May 2005, Williams married the former Jill Myers, whom he met at LSU. They have five children together.

On March 11, 2020, it was announced that Williams accepted the Defensive Coordinator coaching position at Ruston High School, his alma mater.
