= Starting lineup =

Official list of players set to participate upon the beginning of a sporting event

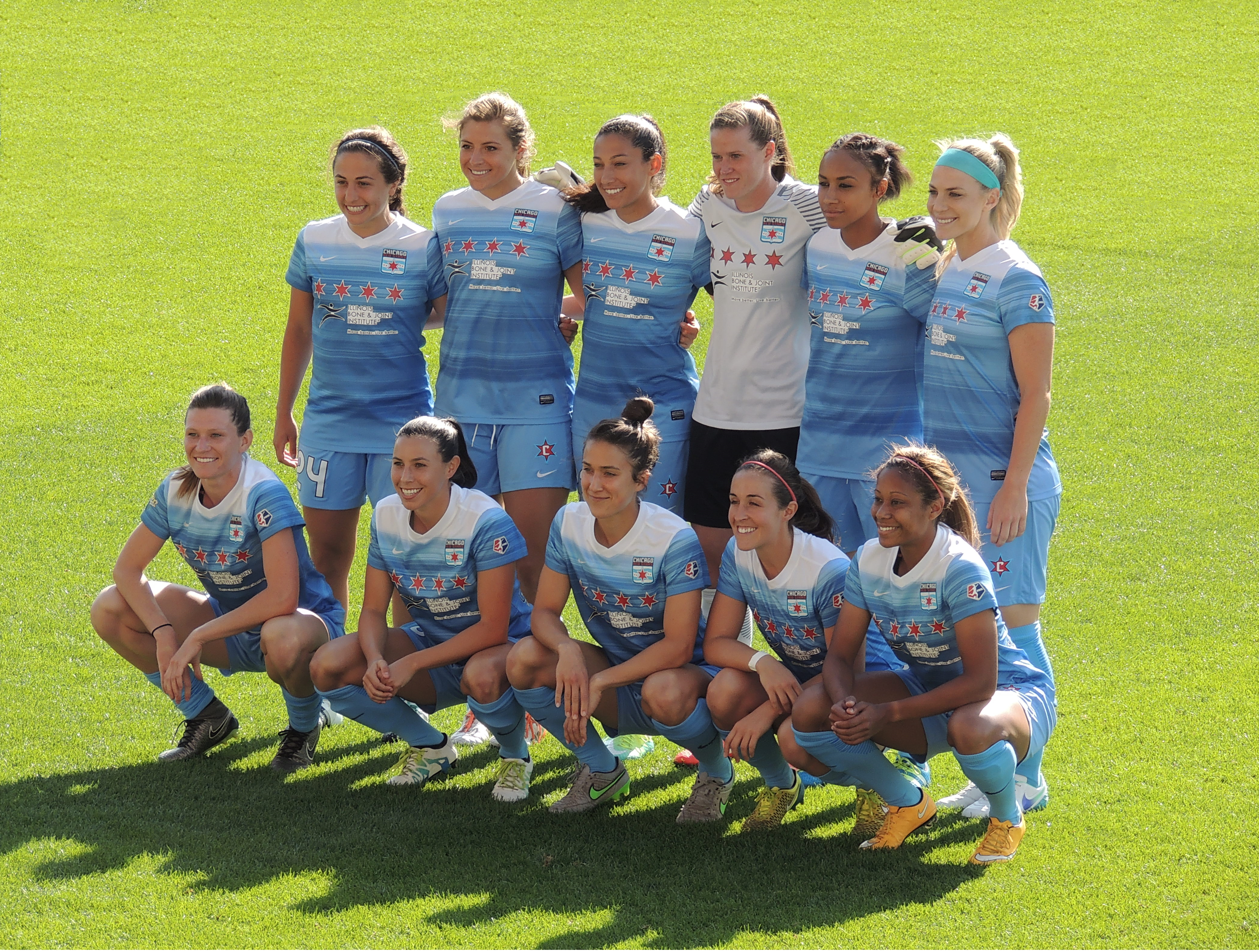
Players in the starting lineup for the Chicago Red Stars posing for a pre-game photo before a National Women's Soccer League (NWSL) game.

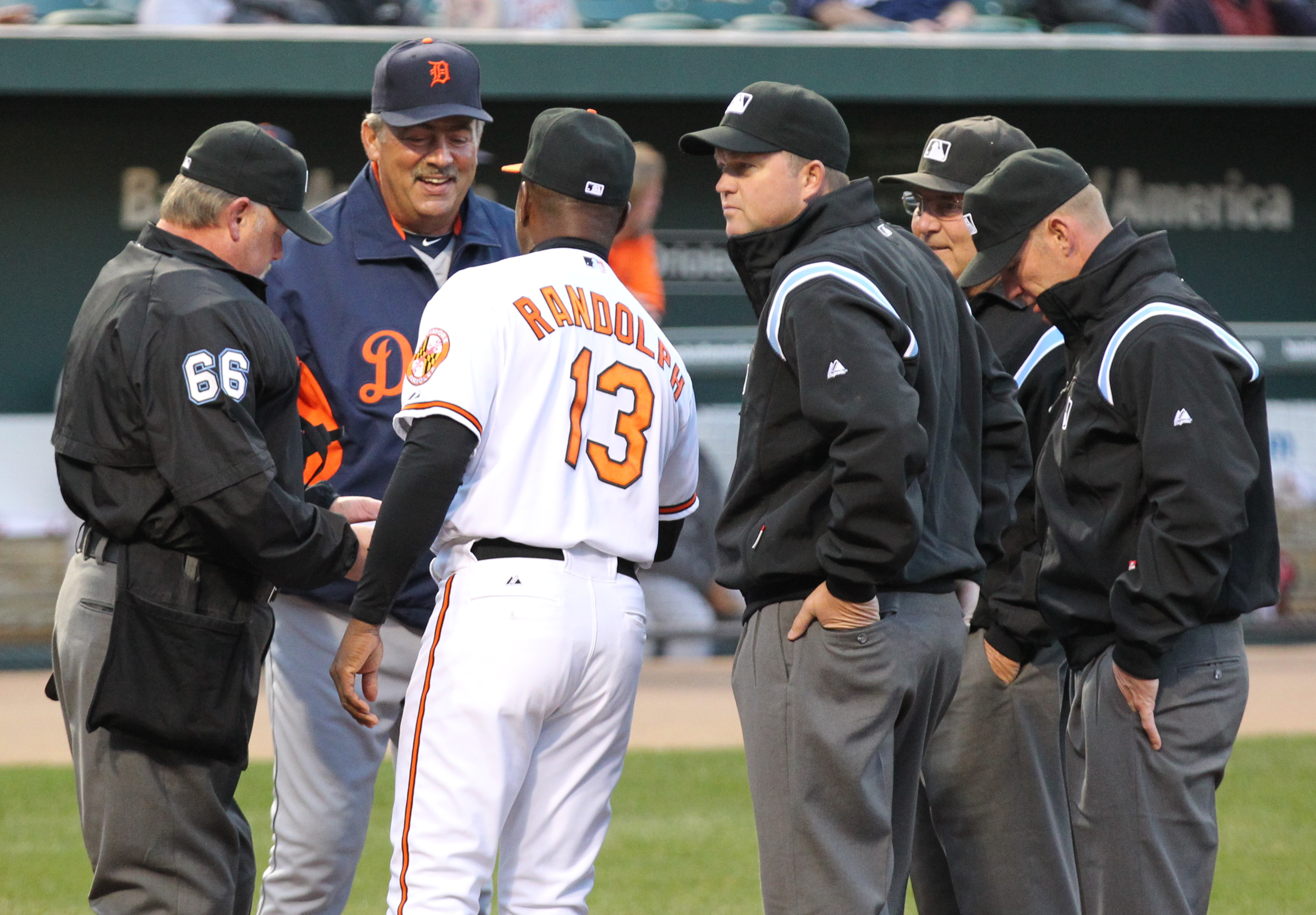
Baseball coaches (and umpires) meeting before a game to exchange lineup cards, which list each team's starting lineup and substitutes

In sports, a starting lineup is an official list of the set of players who will participate in the event when the game begins. The players in the starting lineup are commonly referred to as starters, whereas the others are substitutes or bench players.

The starters are commonly the best players on the team at their respective positions. Consequently, there is often a bit of prestige that is associated with being a starter. This is particularly true in sports with limited substitutions, like baseball or association football (soccer).

When listing a team's lineup, it is common in some sports to include each player's uniform number and their position, along with their name. Position are often designated by abbreviations that are specific to the sport (for example, in American football; "SS" for strong safety). In both baseball and basketball, it is common for a player's position to be denoted by a number, for example: in baseball scorekeeping the shortstop position is "6", while in basketball the small forward position is known as the "three". Thus, the lineups for some sports can include a uniform number, the player's name, and an abbreviation (consisting of letters or numbers) denoting a position.

== American football ==
In American football since the 1950s, most upper level teams use a three-platoon system, each with its own starting lineup. The starting lineups for offense and defense, each with eleven players, typically get the most attention. The starting lineups are defined as the eleven players who take the first offensive or defensive play from scrimmage of a given game. (An offensive player does not have to be on the team that gets possession first to be considered a starter, nor does a defensive player have to be on the team that does not; the first play from scrimmage after the first change of possession counts as well.) The third platoon, special teams, in modern times is composed mostly of backup and reserve players from the offensive or defensive platoons, with the exception of the placekicker or punter; the players who, for instance, take part in the opening kickoff are typically not considered starters.

The player positions dictate certain responsibilities and privileges in regard to handling the ball. A uniform numbering system restricts players' ability to change positions in the middle of the game.

=== Offense ===
The offensive lineup is heavily restricted by rules that have been adopted over the course of the game's development. Several positions (indicated with * in the list below) are mandatory and must appear in any lineup, starting or otherwise. Others can be used or unused at the discretion of a team's coach, provided that no more than 11 players are on the field at any given time and at least seven (usually exactly seven) are positions along the line of scrimmage.

- Quarterback – Officially listed in the high school rulebooks as a "snap receiver," the starting quarterback is usually the focal point of a team's offense. Though technically not required (the snapper can in theory snap the ball onto the ground), the position is universally used.
- Running back – In the pro set formation and the I-formation, there are two, the halfback and the fullback. Some teams forgo designating a full back, and instead replace him with an extra tight end, H-back, or wide receiver. Other teams may utilize three starting running backs, especially at lower levels of play where the passing game is not as developed. Historically, teams which utilized the T-formation or the Single-wing formation had three starting running backs as well.
- Center* – The player in the middle of the line of scrimmage. (This player is almost always the player who snaps the ball, although this role by rule can be taken by any player on the line of scrimmage.)
- Left and right guards* – Lines up on each side of the center.
- Left and right tackles* – Lines up outside the guards.
- Tight end – lines up outside the tackles. Most teams designate at least one starting tight end, though some may have two starting tight ends (by playing with either one less wide receiver or one less running back). Some offensive philosophies, such as the run and shoot offense forgo the tight end entirely.
- Wide receiver – Modern offenses always have at least two starting wide receivers, though historically the position was the last to develop, originally gaining its modern form as teams moved either a tight end (whose name was changed to a "split end") or running back (whose name was changed to "flanker") out wide to be in a better position to catch passes away from the defense. Many modern offenses designate three wide receivers as starters, rarely (but not unknown) are teams that will designated four starting wide receivers, such as the run and shoot offense popular in the 1990s.
- Nonstandard positions such as slotback, wingback, or H-back may also be starters depending on the offensive philosophy of the team.

In addition to the center, guards and tackles, at least two ends (be they tight ends or split end wide receivers) must also be in the lineup.

=== Defense ===
In recent history the 4-3 defense (4 defensive linemen plus 3 linebackers) formation has been standard among college and professional squads. However, the 3-4 (3 defensive linemen plus 4 linebackers) formation is becoming more popular among professional and NCAA Division I teams. Unlike offenses, defenses have no restrictions on positions (as long as no more than 11 players take the field), and the standard lineups have developed largely through tradition, experimentation, trial and error.

- Defensive tackle – Depending on formation a team may have up to two defensive tackles. If there is only one he is called the nose tackle (NT).
- Defensive end – A team has two defensive ends which play outside the defensive tackles.
- Linebacker – A team will generally start between two and four linebackers, depending on the defensive strategy. Most teams either play a 4-3 defense (with 4 lineman and 3 linebackers) or a 3-4 defense (with 3 linemen and 4 linebackers), while some teams employ a nickel defense as their starting defense, such teams typically only use 2 linebackers. Starting linebackers may be designated with names like "outside linebacker", "inside linebacker", "middle linebacker", etc. depending on where they play and the defensive philosophy of the team.
- Defensive back – A team will usually start four defensive backs, though rarely teams may start five by removing a linebacker from the field. Those defensive backs are known as:
  - Cornerback – Plays outside and near the line of scrimmage, with a primary responsibility of covering the other team's wide receivers on pass plays.
  - Strong safety – plays behind, but close to, the linebackers, usually on the same side of the field as the other team's tight end, the strong safety plays like a linebacker/defensive back hybrid.
  - Free safety – Deepest player on the field, whose primary responsibility is as a last line of defense on long passes or to stop running plays that all other players have missed.
  - Nickel back – In teams which start five defensive backs, the fifth back is called the "nickel" (by analogy to the U.S. five-cent coin, known as the nickel). Such a player typically plays on the line of scrimmage, between one of the cornerbacks and the defensive end, often to cover another team's third wide receiver.
- Nonstandard defensive positions such as the "rover" position (first employed by George Webster) are rare but may be used as well.

=== Special teams ===
The third phase, special teams, generally designates only a few positions as "starters"; other than these specialists the other positions on the field are taken up as secondary positions by players who normally play offense or defense.

- Kicker – Also called the placekicker, kicks the ball on plays where it must be kicked from the ground, either kickoffs or field goals.
- Punter – Kicks the ball in situations where it must be kicked by dropping it from his hand. This occurs on punts and free kicks.
- Long snapper – Snaps the ball on field goals and punts, where the ball must normally go much farther than the center usually snaps it.
- Return specialist – Catches and attempts to run back kickoffs, free kicks and punts. Teams may use separate players to return kicks and punts respectively, or may use the same return specialist for both.
- Gunner – Plays outside on kickoffs, free kicks, and punts; is usually the first player to reach the other team's returner. Rarely has been a starting-level player, though some such as Steve Tasker and Matthew Slater have achieved wide recognition for their skills primarily as gunners.

== Association football ==
In association football, the starting lineup is termed a starting 11 (starting eleven) or starting XI. The starting 11 or starting XI is a list of the players who will actively participate in the game when the match begins.

The starting 11 consists of 11 players, with 1 designated goalkeeper. All other positions are optional, and teams can vary the player formations they use.

The formation are often described using the numbers of defenders, midfielders and forwards. For example, a commonly used formation is 4-4-2, which means there are 4 defenders, 4 midfielders and 2 strikers. Some formations may list 4 numbers, which usually differentiates between defensive and attacking midfielders, e.g. 4-2-3-1 would mean 4 defenders, 2 defensive midfielders, 3 attacking midfielders, and 1 striker.

== Australian rules football ==
In Australian rules football, a team starts with eighteen players on the field. The traditional positions are as listed below, however in modern football the players are organised into three main groups, forwards, midfielders and defenders, each consisting of between four and eight players. Only four midfielders from each team are allowed to start inside the centre square, the other 14 players can start anywhere on the field.

- Three forwards (one full-forward, two forward pocket)
- Three half forwards (one centre half-forward, two half-forward flank)
- Three centres (one centre, two wing-men)
- Three half backs (one centre half-back, two half-back flank)
- Three backs (one fullback, two back pocket)
- Three followers (one ruckman, one ruck rover, one rover)

== Baseball ==
The starting lineup in baseball comprises either nine or ten players. In the Central League of Nippon Professional Baseball, there are nine players in the starting lineup and all players bat. American League, National League (MLB) and Pacific League (NPB) teams have the option of using a designated hitter (DH) in place of the pitcher in the batting order. The DH does not play when the team is on defense.

The fielding positions are numbered and abbreviated as follows:

1. P – Pitcher
2. C – Catcher
3. 1B – First baseman
4. 2B – Second baseman
5. 3B – Third baseman
6. SS – Shortstop
7. LF – Left fielder
8. CF – Center fielder
9. RF – Right fielder

In softball, where ten players are in the field, the tenth is usually placed in the outfield (OF); if placed between the infield and outfield, the extra fielder is known as a "rover."

The designated hitter (DH), when used, is designated with the number zero. In variants of the game where all nine positions plus a designated hitter must bat, the designated hitter is instead known as an extra hitter (EH).

== Basketball ==
In the National Basketball Association (NBA), two starting players are traditionally announced as guards, two as forwards, and one as a center. At least ten minutes before the game is scheduled to begin, the scorers need to be supplied with the name and number of each player who is to participate in the game. The various positions are not mentioned anywhere in the official NBA rule book, and most players play more than one position.

The starting lineup on a basketball team usually comprises five positions and is called the 2-1-2 lineup (2 guards, 1 center, 2 forwards):

1. PG – Point guard
2. SG – Shooting guard
3. SF – Small forward
4. PF – Power forward
5. C – Center

In American college basketball, a starting lineup is announced for each team before the game. Starting players are designated as either centers, forwards, or guards. A team can name at most one center, but otherwise any combination of positions is allowable, as long as five players are named. Lineups of three guards, one forward, and one center, or of three guards and two forwards, are the most common alternate lineups.

In the FIBA 3x3 World Cup the game is played 3 on 3, and the positions can be a mix of guards, forwards, and centers.

== Canadian football ==
In Canadian football, a team starts with 12 players on offense, 12 players on defense, and a special teams squad of 12 players for punts, kickoffs, and extra point attempts. As in American football, most of the special teams players are starters or bench players for offence or defence.

Because of substantial differences between the two codes – most notably the larger field and only having three downs to advance the ball 10 yards instead of four – offensive formations are somewhat different in the Canadian game. Most notably, tight ends are almost completely absent in Canada.

The Canadian Football League has an additional rule that at least seven of the 24 offensive and defensive starters in a game be Canadian citizens.

=== Offence ===
1. QB – Quarterback – Explicitly mandatory until 2009; effectively mandatory since then.
2. RB – Running back. Optional, but almost universally used, especially in a starting lineup. Note that the term halfback in Canada refers to a defensive position and is not used in regard to a running back.
3. FB – Fullback. Optional.
4. C – Centre. Mandatory.
5. LG, RG – Left and right guards on either side of the centre. Mandatory.
6. LT, RT – Left and right tackles on either end of the five-man offensive line. Mandatory.
7. SB – Slotback, a similar position to the wide receiver (in fact, in the American game a slotback is considered a type of wide receiver), but lines up closer to the interior linemen and just off the line of scrimmage.
8. WR – Wide receiver. Canadian football typically does not use tight ends, and so wide receivers are almost always split ends.

=== Defence ===
Defences are broadly similar to those in American football, with an extra player used as a defensive back. Since most of the positions are essentially identical to those in American football, only the main differences will be listed here.

1. S – Safety, plays mainly deep pass support. Roughly corresponds to the "free safety" in the American game.
2. DH – Defensive halfback(s), generally assigned to cover the slotback(s) when in man-to-man coverage. Most formations will use two halfbacks. Roughly corresponds to the "strong safety" in the American game.

=== Special teams ===
Positions generally similar to those in American football.

== Gaelic football, hurling, camogie ==
Gaelic football and hurling, as well as ladies' Gaelic football and camogie, use the same starting lineup. Teams consist of one goalkeeper and fourteen outfield players (underage teams may play 13-a-side, omitting the full back and full forward positions). Teams lineup in six lines, with the goalkeeper furthest back and the full-forward line closest to the opposing team's goal. Players play on the left or right of the field looking in the direction they are attacking. Position numbering is fixed and positions are set up so that every attacker has a corresponding defender: for example, a right corner forward (jersey number 13) will be marked by a left corner back (4). Players sometimes swap positions during a match and there are sometimes tactical variations in formation, such as dropping one of the six forwards back to provide a third midfielder. Up to five substitutions are allowed during normal time (and another three if there is extra time), from a bench of 9 or sometimes 11 substitutions; substitutions are not numbered in any particular order.

1. Goalkeeper (jersey number 1)
2. Right corner back (2) -- full back (3) -- left corner back (4)
3. Right half (or wing) back (5) -- centre back (6) -- left half back (7)
4. Two midfielders (or centre-fielders) (8, 9)
5. Right half (or wing) forward (10) -- centre (centre half) forward (11) -- left half forward (12)
6. Right corner forward (13) -- full forward (14) -- left corner forward (15)

== Ice hockey ==
In ice hockey, a team starts out with six players on the ice:

- Two defensemen
- A goaltender
- Three forwards:
  - A center
  - A left-winger
  - A right-winger

The starting forwards are typically known as the top line or first line, as most professional teams rotate four distinct three-man forward lines and three defense pairings.

In ice hockey, a team must submit their starting lineup to the opposing team's captain and to the officials before the game. If a team inserts any other player into the lineup at game time, the opposing captain can direct the official to call a starting the wrong lineup penalty, a two-minute minor.

== Lacrosse ==
The starting lineup in field lacrosse comprises ten players: 3 Attackmen, 3 Defensemen, 3 Midfielders, and 1 Goalkeeper. A team may start a Long-Stick Midfielder for a defensive advantage. A team may have a player reserved exclusively to take face-offs, known as a FOGO.

1. A – Attackmen
2. D – Defensemen
3. M – Midfielder
4. G – Goalkeeper
5. LSM – Long-stick Midfielder
6. FOGO – Face-Off Specialist "Face-Off, Get-Off"

== Netball ==
In netball, a team starts with seven players on the court:

1. GS – Goal shooter
2. GA – Goal attack
3. WA – Wing attack
4. C – Centre
5. WD – Wing defence
6. GD – Goal defence
7. GK – Goal keeper

== Rugby league ==
A Rugby league football starting lineup is

1. 1 – Fullback
2. 2 and 5 – Wingers
3. 3 and 4 – Centres
4. 6 – Stand-off/Five-Eighth
5. 7 – Halfback
6. 8 and 10 – Front row forwards
7. 9 – Hooker
8. 11 and 12 – Second row forwards
9. 13 – Lock forward

== Rugby union ==
Rugby union starting lineups consist of:

1. Two Props – 1 (loosehead) and 3 (tighthead)
2. Hooker – 2
3. Two Locks – 4 and 5
4. Two Flankers – 6 and 7
5. Number Eight – 8
6. Scrum-half – 9
7. Fly-half – 10
8. Two Wings – 11 and 14
9. Two Centres – 12 and 13
10. Fullback – 15

== Volleyball ==
The starting lineup for a volleyball match typically includes:

1. One setter
2. Two outside hitters
3. One opposite hitter
4. Two middle blockers

Variations do exist – sometimes there will be two setters, or three outside hitters without a true opposite. Though the libero is typically announced with the starting lineup, he or she is not considered to be part of it, as the libero will replace one of the above players (typically a middle blocker, as teams will want to split their middle blockers, with one beginning in the front row) before the first rally.
