= Charles Clay (American football) =

American football player (born 1989)

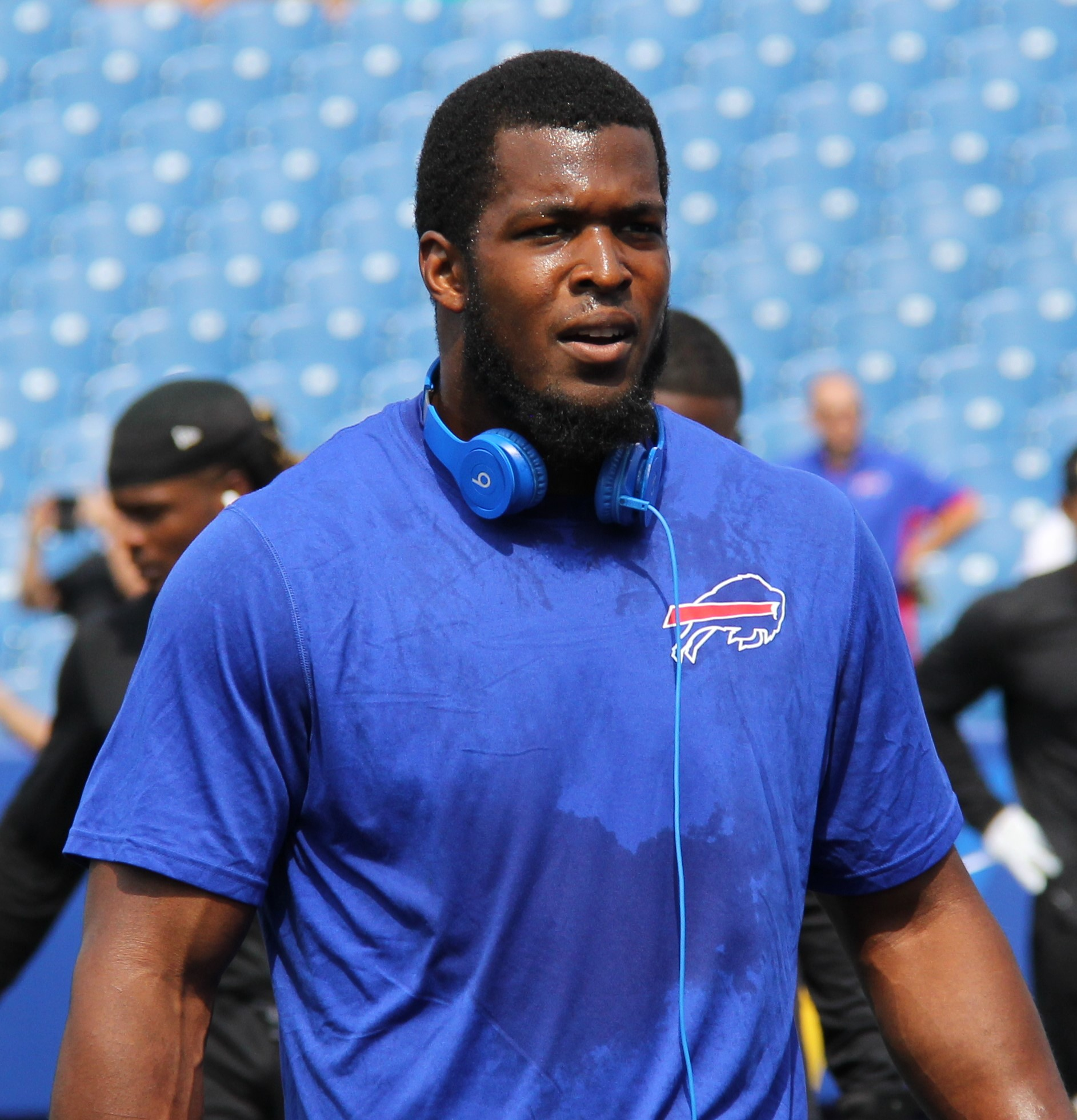
- Clay with the Buffalo Bills in 2015

No. 31, 42, 85
- Position: Tight end

Personal information
- Born: February 13, 1989 (age 37); Little Rock, Arkansas, U.S.
- Listed height: 6 ft 3 in (1.91 m)
- Listed weight: 246 lb (112 kg)

Career information
- High school: Little Rock Central
- College: Tulsa (2007–2010)
- NFL draft: 2011: 6th round, 174th overall pick

Career history
- Miami Dolphins (2011–2014); Buffalo Bills (2015–2018); Arizona Cardinals (2019)

Career NFL statistics
- Receptions: 357
- Receiving yards: 3,868
- Receiving touchdowns: 24
- Stats at Pro Football Reference

Charles Clay (born February 13, 1989) is an American former professional football player who was a tight end in the National Football League (NFL). He played college football for the Tulsa Golden Hurricane and was selected by the Miami Dolphins in the sixth round of the 2011 NFL draft. He also played for the Buffalo Bills and Arizona Cardinals.

Clay began his career as a fullback and often lined up in the backfield as an H-back.

== Early life ==
Clay attended Little Rock Central High School where he was ranked as the 13th top overall prospect in the state of Arkansas by Rivals.com his senior season. As a senior, he rushed for 891 yards and 11 touchdowns, he also had four receiving touchdowns. He was rated a three-star recruit by Rivals.com.

== College career ==
After high school, Clay attended the University of Tulsa, where he majored in business as well as played halfback and fullback from 2007 to 2010. As a true freshman in 2007, he appeared in all 14 games (10 starts). He recorded 69 receptions for 1,024 yards and seven touchdowns. His receiving yards ranked him second on the school's all-time freshman receiving list. He also recorded 304 rushing yards and one touchdown. He was named to the C-USA All-Freshman team as well as All-C-USA honorable mention. He was also named Second-team Freshman All-American by Rivals.com as an All-purpose player. As a sophomore in 2008, he appeared in all 14 games (nine starts). He recorded 38 receptions for 464 yards and nine touchdowns. He also carried the ball 25 times for 145 yards and two touchdowns. In 2009, as a junior, he appeared in all 12 games (11 starts). He recorded 39 receptions for 530 yards and five touchdowns. He also rushed the ball 63 times for 236 yards and seven touchdowns. As a senior in 2010, he appeared in 13 games. He recorded 43 receptions for 526 yards and seven touchdowns. He also, rushed the ball 34 times for 226 yards.

During his career Clay accumulated 685 rushing yards on 145 carries with 10 rushing touchdowns and also added over 2,000 yards receiving with 21 receiving touchdowns.

== Professional career ==
=== Pre-draft ===
Pre-draft measurables
Height	Weight	Arm length	Hand span	Wingspan	40-yard dash	10-yard split	20-yard split	20-yard shuttle	Three-cone drill	Vertical jump	Broad jump	Bench press
6 ft 2 7/8 in (1.90 m)	245 lb (111 kg)	33 in (0.84 m)	9 5/8 in (0.24 m)	6 ft 6 3/8 in (1.99 m)	4.70 s	1.64 s	2.64 s	4.15 s	7.02 s	35.0 in (0.89 m)	9 ft 10 in (3.00 m)	20 reps
All values from NFL Scouting Combine/Pro Day

After playing in the 2011 Senior Bowl and participating in the NFL Scouting Combine, NFL.com's scouts noted that "Clay is an athletic fullback that is a weapon in the receiving game. Possesses good lateral agility and makes people miss in the open field. Delivers powerful shots blocking and shows good leg drive. Strong enough to push the pile in short yardage situations and can break tackles in the secondary."

=== Miami Dolphins ===
Clay was selected in the sixth round (174th overall) of the 2011 NFL draft by the Miami Dolphins. He signed his 4-year rookie deal on July 29.

Clay recorded his first career reception on October 2, 2011, against the San Diego Chargers. On November 20, he recorded his first touchdown against the Buffalo Bills. He finished the 2011 seasons with 16 receptions for 233 yards (14.6 avg.) and three touchdowns and the 2012 season with 18 receptions for 212 yards (11.8 avg.) and two touchdowns as one of the team's fullbacks.

In 2013, after starting tight end Dustin Keller suffered a season-ending knee injury in the preseason, Clay assumed the starting tight end role after being an H-back on the team. In his second start, he recorded his first career rushing touchdown and 109 yards receiving in a Week 2 matchup with the Colts. During Week 14, against the Pittsburgh Steelers he broke multiple tackles, including one of veteran safety Troy Polamalu, on his way to a touchdown in a Miami win. He finished the season with 69 catches (7th among tight ends), 759 yards (tied for 9th), 11.0 avg. and six touchdowns; in addition to 15 yards rushing on seven carries and a rushing touchdown. His performance earned him the 89th ranking position on the 2014 edition of the NFL Top 100.

In the 2014 season, he started all 14 games he appeared in, missing games 11 and 12 due to injury. In week 16, he had a career best 114 yards on six catches in a win over Minnesota. On the season, he recorded 58 receptions for 605 yards (10.4 avg.) and three touchdowns.

=== Buffalo Bills ===
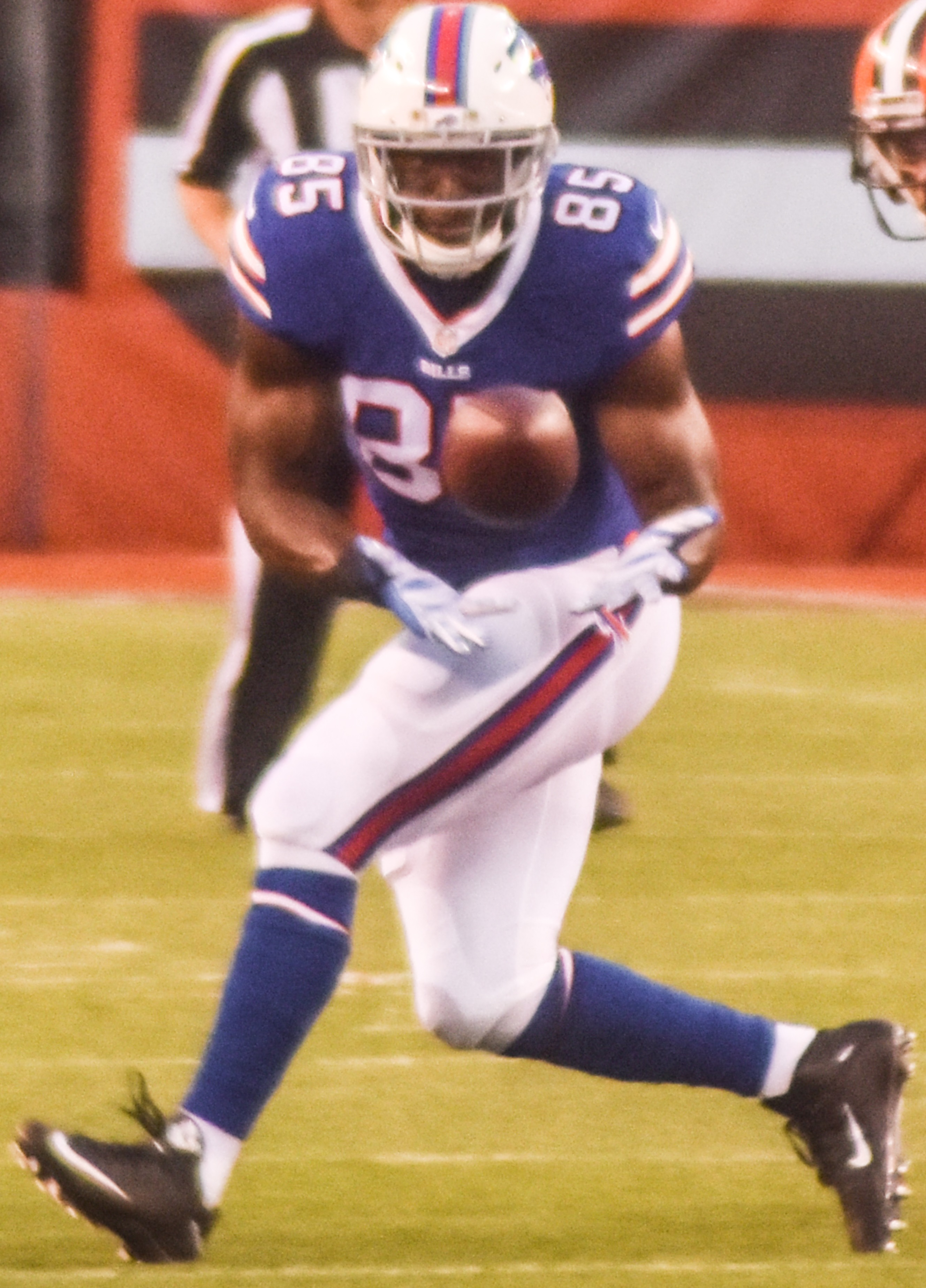
Clay with the Bills in 2015

On March 19, 2015, Clay signed a five-year, $38 million contract with the Buffalo Bills, after the Dolphins elected not to match the offer.

In 2015, his first season in Buffalo, he started 13 games. He had a career best nine catches in game 4 against the Giants, and matched it two weeks later against the Bengals, both losses. He recorded 51 receptions for 528 yards (10.4 avg.) and three touchdowns.

He played all 16 games in 2016, but reached 50 yards receiving in only five of them. All four of his touchdowns came in games 13 to 15.

On September 10, 2017, Clay caught four passes for 53 yards and a touchdown in the season opener against the New York Jets. He played a pivotal role in a 23–17 week 4 victory over undefeated Atlanta with 112 yards.

In 2018, Clay had 21 receptions for a career-low 184 yards and no touchdowns.

On February 15, 2019, Clay was released by the Bills.

==== Buffalo Bills franchise records ====
- First Bills tight end with back-to-back seasons with 50+ receptions, 500+ receiving yards
- Most consecutive games with 1+ receiving TD by a Bills tight end: 3, tied with Scott Chandler

=== Arizona Cardinals ===
On February 19, 2019, Clay signed with the Arizona Cardinals on a one-year contract worth up to $3.25 million with a $350K signing bonus.

== Career statistics ==
=== NFL ===
Year	Team	Games		Receiving					Rushing					Fumbles	
Year	Team	GP	GS	Rec	Yds	Avg	Lng	TD	Att	Yds	Avg	Lng	TD	Fum	Lost
2011	MIA	14	9	16	233	14.6	46	3	3	0	0	0.0	0	0	0
2012	MIA	14	9	18	212	11.8	31	2	0	0	0.0	0	0	0	0
2013	MIA	16	15	69	759	11.0	67	6	7	15	2.1	13	1	0	0
2014	MIA	14	14	58	605	10.4	41	3	0	0	0.0	0	0	0	0
2015	BUF	13	13	51	528	10.4	40	3	0	0	0.0	0	0	1	0
2016	BUF	15	15	57	552	9.7	40	4	0	0	0.0	0	0	0	0
2017	BUF	13	13	49	558	11.4	44	2	0	0	0.0	0	0	1	0
2018	BUF	13	12	21	184	8.8	44	0	0	0	0.0	0	0	1	1
2019	ARI	15	10	18	237	13.2	47	1	0	0	0.0	0	0	1	1
Career		127	110	357	3,868	10.8	67	24	7	15	2.1	13	1	4	2

=== College ===
Season	Team	Games		Receiving					Rushing				
Season	Team	GP	GS	Rec	Yds	Avg	Lng	TD	Att	Yds	Avg	Lng	TD
2007	Tulsa	14	10	69	1,024	14.8	53	7	57	304	5.3	30	1
2008	Tulsa	14	9	38	464	12.2	73	9	25	145	5.8	40	2
2009	Tulsa	12	11	39	530	13.6	63	5	63	236	3.7	20	7
2010	Tulsa	13	—	43	526	12.2	—	7	34	226	6.6	—	0
Career		52	—	189	2,544	13.5	73	28	179	911	5.1	40	10

== Personal life ==
Clay is the son of Charles and Jerrilyn Clay. He was a member of the Fellowship of Christian Athletes. The elder Clay played college football for the Arkansas Razorbacks.
