= Kevon Seymour =

American football player (born 1993)

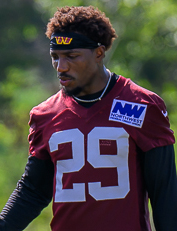
- Seymour with the Washington Commanders in 2025

Washington Commanders
- Position: Cornerback

Personal information
- Born: November 30, 1993 (age 32); Pasadena, California, U.S.
- Listed height: 6 ft 0 in (1.83 m)
- Listed weight: 188 lb (85 kg)

Career information
- High school: John Muir (Pasadena)
- College: USC (2012–2015)
- NFL draft: 2016: 6th round, 218th overall pick

Career history
- Buffalo Bills (2016); Carolina Panthers (2017–2018); Philadelphia Eagles (2020)*; Baltimore Ravens (2021–2023); Washington Commanders (2024–2025)*
- * Offseason or practice squad member only

Career NFL statistics as of 2025
- Tackles: 85
- Sacks: 1
- Fumble recoveries: 2
- Pass deflections: 8
- Stats at Pro Football Reference

Kevon Seymour (/ˈkiːvɒn/ KEE-von; born November 30, 1993) is an American professional football cornerback for the Washington Commanders of the NFL. He played college football for the USC Trojans and was selected by the Buffalo Bills in the sixth round of the 2016 NFL draft. Seymour has also played for the Carolina Panthers, Philadelphia Eagles, and Baltimore Ravens.

== College career ==
In four seasons at USC, Seymour had 126 tackles (4 for a loss), 19 pass deflections, one fumble recovery, and three interceptions with 24 starts. He played as a true freshman in 2012 as a backup cornerback and a special teams contributor. As a sophomore, his role increased as he was a starter in 12 games. In his senior season, he saw limited playing time due to injuries.

== Professional career ==
Pre-draft measurables
Height	Weight	Arm length	Hand span	40-yard dash	10-yard split	20-yard split	20-yard shuttle	Three-cone drill	Vertical jump	Broad jump	Bench press
5 ft 11 1/2 in (1.82 m)	186 lb (84 kg)	30 3/4 in (0.78 m)	9 in (0.23 m)	4.39 s	1.55 s	2.57 s	4.18 s	6.81 s	35.0 in (0.89 m)	10 ft 4 in (3.15 m)	12 reps

=== Buffalo Bills ===
Seymour was selected by the Buffalo Bills in the sixth round (218th overall) of the 2016 NFL draft. He played in 15 games as a rookie with three starts recording 22 tackles and three passes defensed.

=== Carolina Panthers ===
On September 2, 2017, Seymour was traded to the Carolina Panthers for wide receiver Kaelin Clay. On September 1, 2018, Seymour was placed on injured reserve. On September 1, 2019, Seymour was released by the Panthers. After spending the 2019 season out of the NFL, he worked for a tire store in Charlotte, North Carolina.

=== Philadelphia Eagles ===
On December 2, 2020, Seymour was signed to the practice squad of the Philadelphia Eagles. On December 12, 2020, Seymour was signed to the active roster. He was placed on injured reserve on December 26, 2020. He was waived from injured reserve on January 6, 2021, and signed a reserve/futures contract with the team two days later. Seymour was waived on August 31, 2021.

=== Baltimore Ravens ===
On September 15, 2021, Seymour was signed to the Baltimore Ravens' practice squad. On October 2, 2021, Seymour was promoted to the active roster then promoted back to the practice squad. On November 27, 2021, Seymour was promoted to the active roster. He was placed on the reserve/COVID-19 list by the Ravens on November 29, 2021. On December 8, 2021, Seymour was activated from reserve/COVID-19 list by the Ravens. On January 17, 2022, Seymour signed a one-year contract extension with the Ravens. He was released on August 30, 2022, and signed to the practice squad the next day. He was promoted to the active roster on October 1. Seymour was waived on November 2, 2022 and re-signed to the practice squad.

=== Washington Commanders ===
Seymour signed with the practice squad of the Washington Commanders on September 17, 2024. He was suspended for six games on October 22, for violating the league's performance enhancing substance policy.

On March 14, 2025, Seymour re-signed with the Commanders on a one-year contract worth a maximum of $1,170,000. He was placed on injured reserve on August 11, and released with an injury settlement on August 20. The Commanders signed Seymour to their practice squad on December 10.

== NFL career statistics ==
Year	Team	Games		Tackles				Interceptions						Fumbles	
Year	Team	G	GS	Comb	Total	Ast	Sack	PD	Int	Yds	Avg	Lng	TDs	FF	FR
2016	BUF	15	3	22	20	2	0.0	3	0	0	0.0	0	0	0	0
2017	CAR	16	2	22	18	4	0.0	4	0	0	0.0	0	0	0	0
2020	PHI	2	0	8	6	2	0.0	0	0	0	0.0	0	0	0	0
2021	BAL	9	2	25	17	8	1.0	1	0	0	0.0	0	0	0	0
2022	BAL	14	0	3	3	0.0	0	0	0	0	0.0	0	0	0	1
2023	BAL	8	0	3	3	0	0.0	0	0	0	0.0	0	0	0	1
2024	WAS	3	0	2	1	1	0.0	0	0	0	0.0	0	0	0	0
Total		67	7	85	68	17	1.0	8	0	0	0.0	0	0	0	2
