= H-back =

Offensive position in American football

An H-back is an offensive position in American football. The H-back lines up similarly to a tight end, but is "set back" from the line of scrimmage, and is thus counted as one of the four "backs" in the offensive formation. The H-back, while similar in name, should not be confused with "halfback" or "running back", which are used to denote a separate, primary ball-carrying backfield position. The position was made notable in the National Football League (NFL) by the Washington Redskins under head coach Joe Gibbs, who ran a two tight end system. The position was named F-back when used later in Norv Turner's offensive system. The position is similar to that of a slotback (S-back/or A-back)

== Name ==
The name H-back can be confusing, because the H-back rarely carries the ball as halfbacks do; instead, the H-back plays a position similar to a tight end or fullback. The name stems from the playbook notation in use at the time the position was developed. Under the system used by Joe Gibbs – and indeed, by many teams then as now – the standard set of eligible ball carriers consisted of three receivers and three backs. The three receivers, the split end, tight end, and flanker, were labeled "X", "Y", and "Z" on play diagrams. The three backs, quarterback, halfback, and fullback, were labeled "Q", "H", and "F". Gibbs' innovation was to move one of the backs up near the line of scrimmage, to act as an extra blocker. At the time the system was developed, the best running back on the Redskins' roster was John Riggins, a fullback. Since Riggins and quarterback Joe Theismann were vital to the team at the time, the lesser used halfback was removed and replaced with an extra blocker. The standard notation was retained; however, this new blocker was still assigned the "H" symbol on play diagrams, hence the name "H-back" for the position. Like a flanker, the H-back was set back from the line of scrimmage, and the role was often played by an athletic tight end. The H-back often has to be versatile; as a backfield member, they can be lined up to act as a lead blocker on running plays. However, the H-back also fills the roles of a traditional tight end, catching passes over the middle and pass blocking when needed.

== Washington Redskins ==
In the 1980s–2000s Washington Redskins offensive system, the H-back is asked to block, pass protect, and run receiving routes from multiple sets. This compares to the standard tight end which was used primarily as an extra blocker on Washington offensive line. The H-back can line up in the backfield, on the line, or is put into motion. Because of the complexity of the position, a thorough knowledge of the offense is desirable in an H-back. The position, indeed the entire two tight end offense, was created by Gibbs as a direct response to Lawrence Taylor, the New York Giants' dominant linebacker. As Gibbs stated, "We had to try in some way have a special game plan just for Lawrence Taylor. Now you didn't do that very often in this league but I think he's one person that we learned the lesson the hard way. We lost ball games."

== Other uses ==
Offensive formations that utilize the H-back are not commonly used in professional football today. The most recent examples of a professional football team employing the H-back are the Cleveland Browns from 2001 to 2004 under head coach Butch Davis, and the Chicago Bears in 2010 under offensive coordinator Mike Martz, where Brandon Manumaleuna was featured in the role. The Cincinnati Bengals, under coach Marvin Lewis, have used Ryan Hewitt, and at times Jake Fisher, as H-backs since 2014. Aaron Hernandez formerly of the New England Patriots, while a nominal tight end, was often featured as an H-back/wide receiver when Rob Gronkowski was also in the game. Chris Cooley also flourished in his role as an H-back in the offense run by the Washington Redskins during Joe Gibbs' second tenure with the team (2004–2007).

Teams at high school and collegiate levels sometimes utilize H-back formations, but usually only if they have exceptional talent and depth at the tight end and fullback positions. For example, Brigham Young University is traditionally strong at the tight end position, and the Cougars frequently use H-back formations to put their most talented players on the field at one time. During their record-breaking 1996 season, BYU used H-back formations almost every down to allow ample playing time for both Chad Lewis and Itula Mili.

Gus Malzahn is recognized for effectively utilizing the H-back in his offenses; players like Jay Prosch and Peyton Hillis have gone onto success in the NFL. Malzahn achieved the most success utilizing the H-back during his time coaching football for the Auburn, winning a 2011 BCS National Championship and an appearance in the 2014 BCS National Championship Game.

The Wisconsin Badgers have used the H-back position to great effect with Owen Daniels, Travis Beckum, Garrett Graham, and Lance Kendricks, all of whom have played in the NFL. The 2011 Houston Texans played two of these former Wisconsin Badger H-backs, Owen Daniels and Garrett Graham, as tight ends and converted their former tight end James Casey (Rice University) to an H-back.

Additionally, the Oregon Ducks have been experimenting with dual H-back sets as recently as the 2011 BCS Championship game. Charles Clay is a current example of an H-back. Former quarterback Braxton Miller of Ohio State has also been featured in the position recently, running jet sweeps and passing routes out of high-versatility formations.

In the 2020s, H-Backs are commonly used both in collegiate and NFL offenses, with many teams employing a specific player or set of players in the role and responsibilities of an H-Back. In modern offenses, H-Backs are aligned in a variety of spots across a formation, are often used in pre-snap motion, and have responsibilities that include pass protection/blocking from the backfield, lead blocking in the run game, and contributing as receivers, often as underneath/safety net options for passers.. These players are often fullbacks and tight ends, with tight ends who specialize in the role and responsibilities of an H-Back often being called "H"-tight ends.
