= Walt Powell =

American football player (born 1991)

No. 18, 19
- Position: Wide receiver / return specialist

Personal information
- Born: November 23, 1991 (age 34); St. Louis, Missouri, U.S.
- Listed height: 5 ft 11 in (1.80 m)
- Listed weight: 189 lb (86 kg)

Career information
- High school: Hazelwood East (St. Louis)
- College: Murray State
- NFL draft: 2014: 6th round, 196th overall pick

Career history
- Arizona Cardinals (2014)*; New York Jets (2014–2015); Buffalo Bills (2015)*; Oakland Raiders (2015); Buffalo Bills (2015–2017); Jacksonville Jaguars (2017)*
- * Offseason or practice squad member only

Career NFL statistics
- Receptions: 14
- Receiving yards: 142
- Return yards: 374
- Stats at Pro Football Reference

Walter Lee Powell (born November 23, 1991) is an American former professional football player who was a wide receiver and return specialist in the National Football League (NFL). He played college football for the Murray State Racers and was selected by the Arizona Cardinals in the sixth round of the 2014 NFL draft. After retiring from the NFL, Powell became part of the development team for a mobile app called Politiscope.

== College career ==
Powell finished 17th in the 2013 Walter Payton Award voting.

== Professional career ==
=== Arizona Cardinals ===
Powell was selected in the sixth round (196th overall) of the 2014 NFL draft. He was waived on August 31, 2014 during final roster cuts.

=== New York Jets ===
Powell was claimed off waivers by the New York Jets on September 1, 2014. In 4 games of his rookie season of 2014, Powell returned 8 kickoffs for 233 yards and 12 punts for 48 yards.

In the third preseason game against the interleague-rival New York Giants on August 29, 2015, Powell returned a punt 59 yards for a touchdown. Despite a quality performance in the preseason, the Jets released Powell on September 5, 2015 as part of the final roster cuts. However, the next day on September 6, the Jets signed Powell to their practice squad.

=== Buffalo Bills (first stint) ===
Powell was signed by the Bills and assigned to the team's practice squad on October 6, 2015.

=== Oakland Raiders ===
On October 16, 2015, the Oakland Raiders signed Powell to their active roster off the Bills' practice squad. On November 3, 2015, he was waived by the Raiders.

=== Buffalo Bills (second stint) ===
On November 6, 2015, Powell was re-signed to the Bills' practice squad. He was promoted to the active roster on December 22, 2015.

On November 29, 2016 Powell was placed on injured reserve with an ankle injury.

Powell was suspended for the first four games of the 2017 season for violating the NFL policy on performance enhancing substances. After being reinstated from suspension on October 2, 2017, Powell was released by the Bills.

=== Jacksonville Jaguars ===
On January 16, 2018, Powell was signed to the Jacksonville Jaguars' practice squad.

== Post-playing career ==
In an article for The Players' Tribune, Powell said that he was contacted by several NFL teams prior to the start of the 2019 NFL season asking him to try out, but he declined these offers to concentrate on developing a mobile app called Politiscope. He partnered with his brother, former NFL player Brandon Williams, to develop the app, which launched January 17, 2019.
