= Corbin Bryant =

American football player (born 1988)

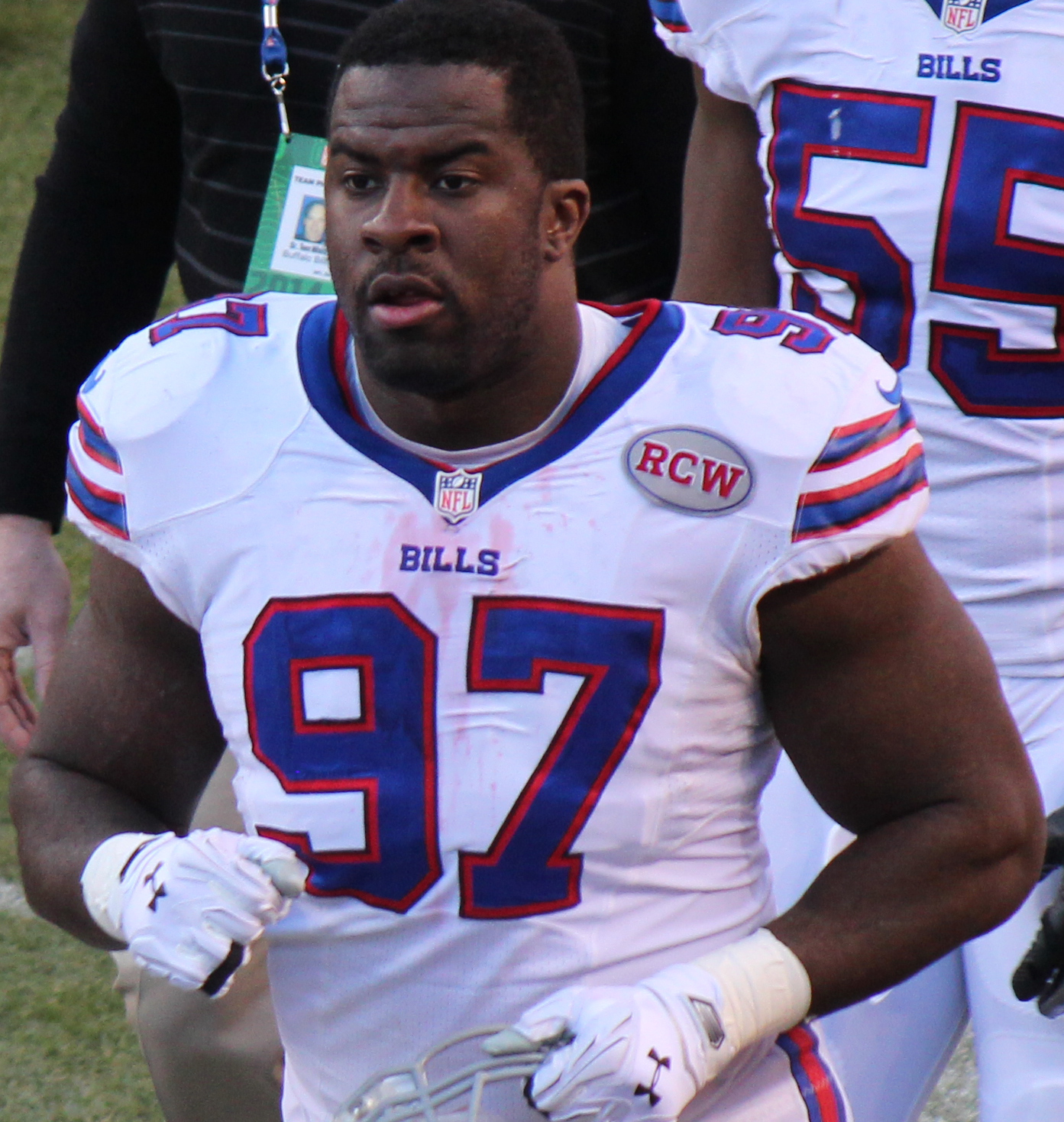
- Bryant with the Buffalo Bills in 2014

No. 95, 97
- Position: Nose tackle

Personal information
- Born: January 4, 1988 (age 38); Chicago, Illinois, U.S.
- Listed height: 6 ft 4 in (1.93 m)
- Listed weight: 300 lb (136 kg)

Career information
- High school: Morgan Park (Chicago)
- College: Northwestern
- NFL draft: 2011: undrafted

Career history
- Chicago Bears (2011); Pittsburgh Steelers (2011–2012); Buffalo Bills (2012–2016); New York Giants (2017)

Career NFL statistics
- Total tackles: 84
- Sacks: 2.5
- Forced fumbles: 1
- Stats at Pro Football Reference

Corbin Sinclair Bryant (born January 4, 1988) is an American former professional football player who was a nose tackle in the National Football League (NFL). He played college football for the Northwestern Wildcats and was signed by the Chicago Bears as an undrafted free agent in the 2011. He was also a member of the Pittsburgh Steelers, Buffalo Bills and New York Giants.

== College career ==
Bryant was selected and participated in 2011 NFL Players Association All-Star game. He was named as an all-conference honorable mention.

== Professional career ==
=== Chicago Bears ===
On July 26, 2011, Bryant signed with the Chicago Bears as an undrafted free agent.

=== Pittsburgh Steelers ===
On September 4, 2011, Bryant signed with the Pittsburgh Steelers to join the practice squad.

=== Buffalo Bills ===
On December 31, 2012, Bryant signed with the Buffalo Bills to a future/reserve contract.

In Week 8 of the 2016 season, Bryant suffered a shoulder injury that kept him out for three games before being placed on injured reserve on November 29, 2016.

=== New York Giants ===
On June 8, 2017, Bryant signed with the New York Giants. On August 15, 2017, the Giants placed Bryant on injured reserve after dislocating his elbow. He was released with a settlement on November 16, 2017.
