= 2014 Buffalo Bills season =

55th season in franchise history; first under Pegula ownership

- Owner: Mary Wilson (weeks 1-5); Terrence Pegula (week 6-present)
- General manager: Doug Whaley
- Head coach: Doug Marrone
- Home stadium: Ralph Wilson Stadium; Ford Field (week 12)

Results
- Record: 9–7
- Division place: 2nd AFC East
- Playoffs: Did not qualify
- Pro Bowlers: DT Marcell Dareus; DT Kyle Williams; DE Mario Williams

Uniform
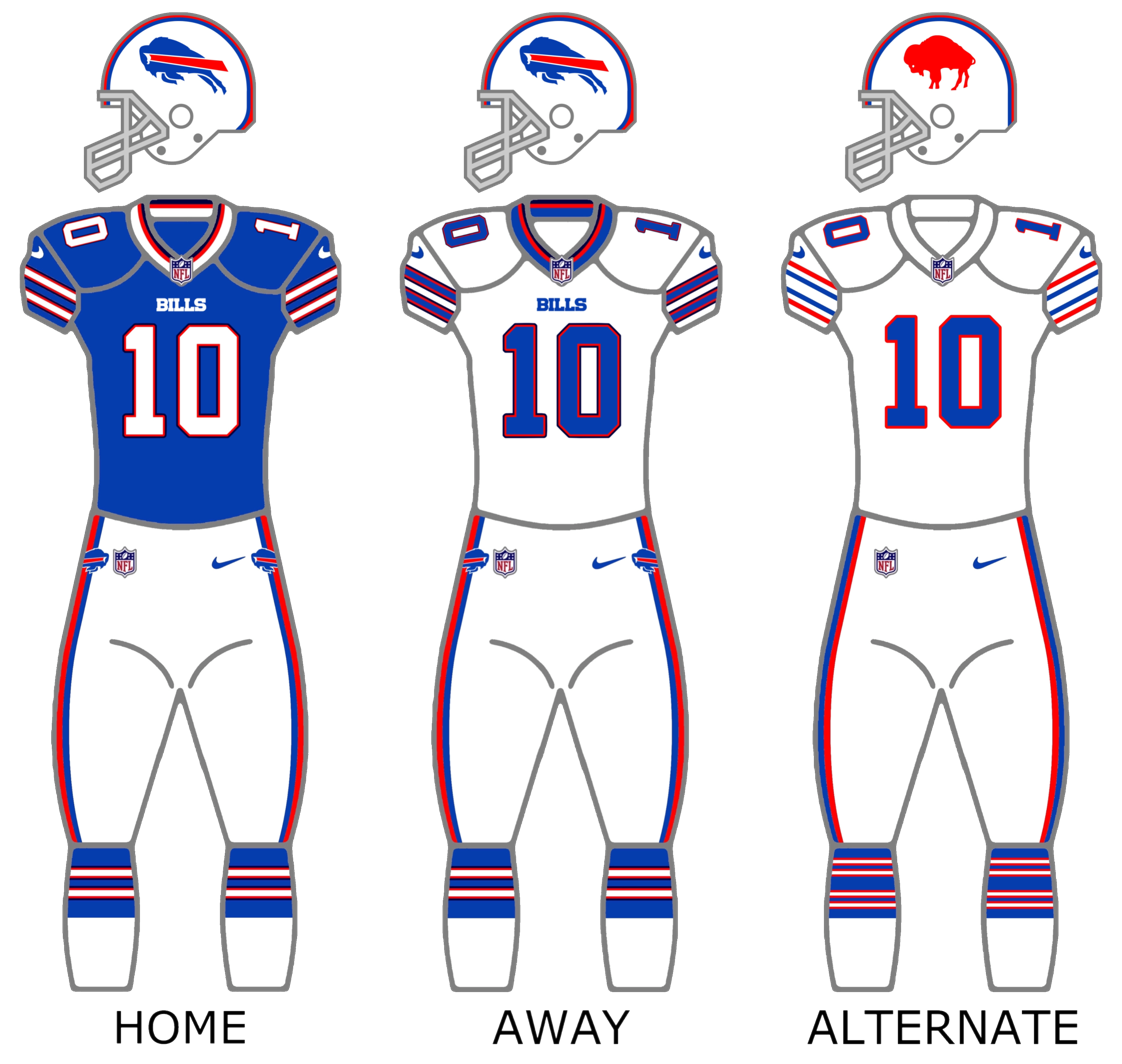

The 2014 season was the Buffalo Bills' 45th in the National Football League (NFL), their 55th overall, their second and final season under head coach Doug Marrone, and the first in franchise history without Ralph Wilson as owner. The Bills defense continued its strong play from last season, finishing first in the league with 54 quarterback sacks. Overall, the Bills improved on their 6–10 record from 2013, finishing with a 9–7 record, their first winning season since 2004, yet they still missed the playoffs after a Week 16 loss to the Oakland Raiders.

== Background ==
=== Death of Ralph Wilson and sale to Terrence Pegula ===
Ralph Wilson, the founding owner of the Buffalo Bills, died at the age of 95 on March 25, 2014. In his will, Wilson placed the team into a trust governed by his wife, niece and two team officials, who were separately given instructions to sell the team in short order, not only to the highest bidder, but with a precondition that the team be kept in Buffalo. Three bidders stepped forward with bids: stalking horse bidder Donald Trump, the family of Buffalo Sabres owner and natural gas baron Terrence Pegula and a consortium led by musician Jon Bon Jovi and the principals of Maple Leaf Sports & Entertainment, the last of whom raised serious concerns that the team would relocate to Toronto at the first opportunity. The Pegula family was named as the winning bidder on September 9 and closed on its purchase of the team on October 8.

=== Cancellation of the Toronto Series ===
On March 5, 2014, three weeks before Wilson's death, the Bills announced the postponement of the Bills Toronto Series for one year. Bills President and CEO Russ Brandon would evaluate the series in the future, possibly to permanently cancel games in Toronto. On December 3, 2014, after six years and a 1–5 record (their only win coming in a 23–0 shutout victory against the Washington Redskins), the Bills Toronto Series was permanently cancelled.

=== On-field ===
The Bills won their first two games, a 23–20 overtime road win at Chicago (their first-ever victory at Soldier Field) and an emotionally raucous 29–10 home win against division rival Miami, a game played just days after the announcement that the Pegulas would purchase the team and keep it in Buffalo. But Buffalo lost their next two, a 22–10 loss at home against San Diego and a 23–17 loss on the road at Houston, after which Marrone benched quarterback EJ Manuel (their first round pick the previous year) in favor of journeyman Kyle Orton. In his first start as a Bill against Detroit at Ford Field, Orton threw for 308 yards as Buffalo came back from a 14-0 halftime deficit to defeat Detroit 17–14 in then-defensive coordinator Jim Schwartz's first return to Detroit since being fired in the offseason, following an eventual game-winning 58-yard field goal by kicker Dan Carpenter.

Buffalo would lose its next game, a 37–22 loss at home against New England before coming back from a 16–10 deficit against Minnesota to win 17-16 after Orton threw for 283 yards, two touchdowns, the second of which to rookie wide receiver Sammy Watkins and connecting with tight end Scott Chandler for 18 yards to convert a 3rd-and-12 and 24 yards to convert a 4th-and-20, respectively (Orton also had an interception and a lost fumble, one of three for the Bills offense). Unfortunately for Buffalo, running backs C. J. Spiller and Fred Jackson were both injured in the first half. With running back Bryce Brown, who the Bills traded their conditional fourth-rounder that can become a third-round selection (that they had acquired in the trade that sent Stevie Johnson to San Francisco) to Philadelphia, inactive for the game and no time to find anyone to help carry the ball, running back Anthony Dixon, who the Bills signed as a free agent from San Francisco was left to carry the ball himself, with fullback Frank Summers assisting.

On November 30, the Bills beat the Cleveland Browns giving them their seventh win, which not only improved on the previous season, in which they finished 6-10 for the third time since 2003 (they finished 6–10 in 2009 and 2011, the latter of which after they started 5–2), but it also gives them their best start entering December since the 2000 Buffalo Bills season, in which they finished 8-8 and missed the playoffs. With a win against the Green Bay Packers on December 14, the Bills broke a league-leading streak of nine consecutive losing seasons dating back to 2005; however, the next week's 26–24 loss to the Oakland Raiders eliminated them from playoff contention for the 15th consecutive year, continuing a league-leading drought. The team finished with a 17–9 win against the New England Patriots, who were resting the starters in preparation for a playoff run; the win was the first time the team had won at Gillette Stadium (they had lost all 12 previous attempts) and established the team's first winning season since 2004 (former head coach Mike Mularkey's first season).

== Roster changes ==
=== Free agents lost ===
Position	Player	2014 Team	Notes
S	Jairus Byrd	New Orleans Saints	Signed 6 years/$56 million
DE	Alex Carrington	St. Louis Rams	Signed 1 year/$1.5 million
S	Jim Leonhard	Cleveland Browns	Signed 1 year/$855,000
LB	Arthur Moats	Pittsburgh Steelers	Signed 1 year/$795,000
OT	Thomas Welch	unsigned	

=== Signings ===
Position	Player	2013 Team	Date signed	Notes and references
MLB	Brandon Spikes	New England Patriots	March 18	Signed 1 year/$3.25 million
RB	Anthony Dixon	San Francisco 49ers	March 15	Signed 3 years/$3.5 million
OG	Chris Williams	St. Louis Rams	March 12	Signed 4 years/$13.4 million
CB	Corey Graham	Baltimore Ravens	March 12	Signed 4 years/$16.3 million
LB	Keith Rivers	New York Giants	March 12	Signed 2 years/$4.05 million
CB	Aaron Williams	Buffalo Bills	March 5	Signed 4 years/$26.01 million extension
K	Dan Carpenter	Buffalo Bills	March 11	Signed 4 years/$9.95 million extension
TE	Scott Chandler	Buffalo Bills	March 13	Signed 2 years/$4.75 million extension
RB	Fred Jackson	Buffalo Bills	July 30	Signed 1 year/$2.6 million extension

== 2014 draft ==
2014 Buffalo Bills Draft
Round	Selection	Player	Position	College
1	4	Sammy Watkins	Wide receiver	Clemson
2	44	Cyrus Kouandjio	Offensive tackle	Alabama
3	73	Preston Brown	Linebacker	Louisville
4	109	Ross Cockrell	Cornerback	Duke
5	153	Cyril Richardson	Guard	Baylor
6	None — see draft trades below			
7	221	Randell Johnson	Linebacker	Florida Atlantic
7	237	Seantrel Henderson	Offensive tackle	Miami

Draft trades

- The Bills traded their original first-round selection (No. 9 overall) and their 2015 first- and fourth-round selections to the Cleveland Browns in exchange for the Browns' first-round selection (No. 4 overall).
- The Bills traded their original second-round selection (No. 41 overall) to the St. Louis Rams in exchange for the Rams' second- and fifth-round selections (Nos. 44 and 153 overall, respectively).
- The Bills traded their original fifth-round selection (No. 149 overall) to the Tampa Bay Buccaneers in exchange for the Buccaneers' seventh-round selection (No. 221 overall) and a 2015 fifth-round selection.
- The Bills traded their sixth-round selection (No. 185 overall) to the Tampa Bay Buccaneers in exchange for wide receiver Mike Williams.
- The Bills traded their original seventh-round selection (No. 224 overall) to the Philadelphia Eagles in exchange running back Bryce Brown and the Eagles' seventh-round selection (No. 237 overall). The trade also includes a conditional future draft selection, which the Eagles could receive from the Bills in either 2015 or 2016. If Brown hits undisclosed statistical rushing targets in 2014, the Eagles will receive the Bills' 2016 third-round selection, otherwise, the Eagles could receive the Bills' 2015 fourth-round selection, which the Bills conditionally acquired in a trade that sent wide receiver Stevie Johnson to the San Francisco 49ers. However, if Johnson does not meet certain statistical receiving targets with the 49ers in 2014, the trade with the 49ers will be voided, and if Brown does not meet certain statistical rushing targets with the Bills in 2014, the Bills will not have to send a future selection to the Eagles.

== Staff ==
2014 Buffalo Bills staff
Front office: Owner/CEO – Terrence Pegula; Owner – Kim Pegula; President – Russ Brandon; General Manager – Doug Whaley; Senior Vice President of Football Administration – Jim Overdorf; Director of Football Administration - Don Purdy; Special Assistant – Buddy Nix; Director of Player Personnel – Jim Monos; Director of Pro Personnel – Tom Gibbons; Assistant Director of Pro Personnel – Rob Hanrahan; Director of College Scouting – Kelvin Fisher; Contract Administrator/Football Analyst – Kevin Meganck; Director of Analytics – Michael Lyons; Head coaches: Head coach – Doug Marrone; Assistant to the head coach – Stephen Brown; Offensive coaches: Offensive coordinator – Nathaniel Hackett; Quarterbacks – Todd Downing; Running backs – Tyrone Wheatley; Wide receivers – Rob Moore; Tight ends – Greg Adkins; Offensive line – Pat Morris; Senior offensive assistant – Jim Hostler; Offensive quality control – Kurt Anderson; Offensive quality control – Jason Vrable	Defensive coaches: Defensive coordinator – Jim Schwartz; Defensive line – Pepper Johnson; Assistant defensive line – Jason Rebrovich; Linebackers – Fred Pagac; Defensive backs – Donnie Henderson; Assistant defensive backs – Samson Brown; Defensive quality control – Thad Bogardus; Special teams coaches: Special teams coordinator – Danny Crossman; Special teams assistant – John Anselmo; Strength and conditioning: Head strength and conditioning – Eric Ciano; Assistant strength and conditioning – Hal Luther; Strength and conditioning assistant – Dan Liburd

== Final roster ==
2014 Buffalo Bills roster
Quarterbacks (QB): 3 EJ Manuel; 18 Kyle Orton; Running backs (RB): 35 Bryce Brown; 26 Anthony Dixon; 22 Fred Jackson; 28 C. J. Spiller; Wide receivers (WR): 81 Marcus Easley; 88 Marquise Goodwin; 15 Chris Hogan; 11 Marcus Thigpen; 80 Deonte Thompson; 14 Sammy Watkins; 10 Robert Woods; Tight ends (TE): 84 Scott Chandler; 89 Chris Gragg; 48 MarQueis Gray; 85 Lee Smith	Offensive linemen (OL): 77 Cordy Glenn T; 75 Chris Hairston T; 66 Seantrel Henderson T; 71 Cyrus Kouandjio T; 79 Erik Pears G; 68 Cyril Richardson G; 60 Kraig Urbik G/C; 70 Eric Wood C; Defensive linemen (DL): 97 Corbin Bryant DT; 96 Stefan Charles DT; 99 Marcell Dareus DT; 55 Jerry Hughes DE; 91 Manny Lawson DE; 95 Kyle Williams DT; 94 Mario Williams DE; 92 Jarius Wynn DE	Linebackers (LB): 53 Nigel Bradham OLB; 52 Preston Brown OLB; 54 Larry Dean OLB; 58 Randell Johnson OLB; 57 Ty Powell MLB; 56 Keith Rivers OLB; 51 Brandon Spikes MLB; Defensive backs (DB): 33 Ron Brooks CB; 29 Ross Cockrell CB; 24 Stephon Gilmore CB; 20 Corey Graham CB; 30 Bacarri Rambo FS; 37 Nickell Robey-Coleman CB; 25 Da'Norris Searcy SS; 23 Aaron Williams FS; 27 Duke Williams SS; Special teams (ST): 2 Dan Carpenter K; 4 Jordan Gay K; 65 Garrison Sanborn LS; 6 Colton Schmidt P	Practice squad: 46 Deon Broomfield S; 62 William Campbell T; 45 Jimmy Gaines LB; 86 Caleb Holley WR; 98 Ike Igbinosun DE; 93 Bryan Johnson LB; 73 D. J. Morrell G; 17 Tobais Palmer WR; 44 Rod Sweeting CB; 90 Jeremy Towns DT; 7 Jeff Tuel QB; Reserve: 50 Kiko Alonso OLB (NF-Inj.); 30 Mario Butler CB (IR); 31 Kenny Ladler FS (IR); 21 Leodis McKelvin CB (IR); 36 Jonathan Meeks FS (IR); 58 Stevenson Sylvester OLB (IR); 74 Chris Williams G (IR); Rookies in italics 53 active, 8 reserve, 11 practice squad

== Schedule ==
=== Preseason ===
On February 27, 2014, the NFL announced that, to celebrate the induction of wide receiver Andre Reed, the Bills would play the New York Giants in the Pro Football Hall of Fame Game in Canton, Ohio, which took place on August 3, 2014, and aired on NBC. The remainder of the Bills' preseason opponents were announced on April 9, 2014.

Week	Date	Opponent	Result	Record	Venue	Recap
HOF	August 3	vs. New York Giants	**L** 13–17	0–1	Fawcett Stadium (Canton, Ohio)	Recap
1	August 8	at Carolina Panthers	**W** 20–18	1–1	Bank of America Stadium	Recap
2	August 16	at Pittsburgh Steelers	**L** 16–19	1–2	Heinz Field	Recap
3	August 23	Tampa Bay Buccaneers	**L** 14–27	1–3	Ralph Wilson Stadium	Recap
4	August 28	Detroit Lions	**L** 0–23	1–4	Ralph Wilson Stadium	Recap

=== Regular season ===
Week	Date	Opponent	Result	Record	Venue	Recap
1	September 7	at Chicago Bears	**W** 23–20 (OT)	1–0	Soldier Field	Recap
2	September 14	**Miami Dolphins**	**W** 29–10	2–0	Ralph Wilson Stadium	Recap
3	September 21	San Diego Chargers	**L** 10–22	2–1	Ralph Wilson Stadium	Recap
4	September 28	at Houston Texans	**L** 17–23	2–2	NRG Stadium	Recap
5	October 5	at Detroit Lions	**W** 17–14	3–2	Ford Field	Recap
6	October 12	**New England Patriots**	**L** 22–37	3–3	Ralph Wilson Stadium	Recap
7	October 19	Minnesota Vikings	**W** 17–16	4–3	Ralph Wilson Stadium	Recap
8	October 26	at **New York Jets**	**W** 43–23	5–3	MetLife Stadium	Recap
9	Bye					
10	November 9	Kansas City Chiefs	**L** 13–17	5–4	Ralph Wilson Stadium	Recap
11	November 13	at **Miami Dolphins**	**L** 9–22	5–5	Sun Life Stadium	Recap
12	November 24 (Note: The Week 12 game vs. the New York Jets, originally scheduled at 1:00 p.m. EST on November 23 at Ralph Wilson Stadium, was re-scheduled to November 24 at 7:00 p.m. EST and relocated to Ford Field in Detroit due to a lake-effect snowstorm that struck the Buffalo area.)	**New York Jets**	**W** 38–3	6–5	Ford Field	Recap
13	November 30	Cleveland Browns	**W** 26–10	7–5	Ralph Wilson Stadium	Recap
14	December 7	at Denver Broncos	**L** 17–24	7–6	Sports Authority Field at Mile High	Recap
15	December 14	Green Bay Packers	**W** 21–13	8–6	Ralph Wilson Stadium	Recap
16	December 21	at Oakland Raiders	**L** 24–26	8–7	O.co Coliseum	Recap
17	December 28	at **New England Patriots**	**W** 17–9	9–7	Gillette Stadium	Recap

Notes

- Intra-division opponents are in **bold** text.
- For the first time since 2007, the Bills did not play a game in Toronto, as the Bills Toronto Series was suspended in March 2014 and permanently canceled later that year.

=== Game summaries ===
==== Week 1: at Chicago Bears ====
Week One: Buffalo Bills at Chicago Bears – Game summary

Quarter	1	2	3	4	OT	Total
**Bills**	7	10	0	3	3	**23**
Bears	7	0	10	3	0	**20**

at Soldier Field, Chicago, Illinois

- Date: September 7
- Game time: 1:00pm EDT/12:00pm CDT
- Game weather: 74 °F (23 °C), sunny
- Game attendance: 62,425
- Referee: Brad Allen
- TV announcers (Fox): Kenny Albert, Daryl Johnston and Tony Siragusa
- Recap, Gamebook

Game information

**First quarter**

- CHI – Martellus Bennett 12-yard pass from Jay Cutler (Robbie Gould kick), 11:35. Bears 7–0. **Drive: 4 plays, 66 yards, 1:55.**
- BUF – EJ Manuel 2-yard run (Dan Carpenter kick), 6:52. Tied 7–7. **Drive: 9 plays, 71 yards, 4:43.**

**Second quarter**

- BUF – Dan Carpenter 50-yard field goal, 8:07. Bills 10–7. **Drive: 6 plays, 14 yards, 3:23.**
- BUF – C. J. Spiller 7 yard pass from EJ Manuel (Dan Carpenter kick), 5:30. Bills 17–7. **Drive: 1 play, 7 yards, 0:06.**

**Third quarter**

- CHI – Robbie Gould 41-yard field goal, 9:34. Bills 17–10. **Drive: 11 plays, 57 yards, 5:26.**
- CHI – Brandon Marshall 11 yard pass from Jay Cutler (Robbie Gould kick), 2:30. Tied 17–17. **Drive: 5 plays, 56 yards, 2:30.**

**Fourth quarter**

- BUF – Dan Carpenter 33-yard field goal, 4:02. Bills 20–17. **Drive: 8 plays, 37 yards, 3:50.**
- CHI – Robbie Gould 37-yard field goal, 0:30. Tied 20–20. **Drive: 12 plays, 61 yards, 3:32.**

**Overtime**

- BUF – Dan Carpenter 27-yard field goal, 9:46. Bills 23–20. **Drive: 7 plays, 69 yards, 3:34.**

**Top passers**

- BUF – EJ Manuel – 16/22, 173 yards, TD, 1 INT
- CHI – Jay Cutler – 34/49, 349 yards, TD, 2 INT

**Top rushers**

- BUF – Fred Jackson – 7 carries, 61 yards
- CHI – Matt Forte – 17 carries, 82 yards

**Top receivers**

- BUF – Robert Woods – 4 receptions, 78 yards
- CHI – Matt Forte – 8 receptions, 87 yards

==== Week 2: vs. Miami Dolphins ====
Week Two: Miami Dolphins at Buffalo Bills – Game summary

Quarter	1	2	3	4	Total
Dolphins	0	0	10	0	**10**
**Bills**	6	3	14	6	**29**

at Ralph Wilson Stadium, Orchard Park, New York

- Date: September 14
- Game time: 1:00pm EDT
- Game weather: 58 °F (14 °C), mostly cloudy
- Game attendance: 69,954
- Referee: Clete Blakeman
- TV announcers (CBS): Tom McCarthy and Adam Archuleta
- Recap, Gamebook

Game information

**First quarter**

- BUF – Dan Carpenter 27-yard field goal, 4:47. Bills 3–0. **Drive: 10 plays, 49 yards, 4:46.**
- BUF – Dan Carpenter 27-yard field goal, 0:22. Bills 6–0. **Drive: 6 plays, 22 yards, 1:50.**

**Second quarter**

- BUF – Dan Carpenter 31-yard field goal, 10:22. Bills 9–0. **Drive: 6 plays, 40 yards, 2:15.**

**Third quarter**

- MIA – Caleb Sturgis 34-yard field goal, 9:35. Bills 9–3. **Drive: 13 plays, 64 yards, 5:25.**
- BUF – C. J. Spiller 102-yard kickoff return (Dan Carpenter kick), 9:23. Bills 16–3.
- MIA – Mike Wallace 7-yard pass from Ryan Tannehill (Caleb Sturgis kick), 3:15. Bills 16–10. **Drive: 11 plays, 64 yards, 6:08.**
- BUF – Sammy Watkins 12-yard pass from EJ Manuel (Dan Carpenter kick), 0:13. Bills 23–10. **Drive: 6 plays, 77 yards, 3:02.**

**Fourth quarter**

- BUF – Dan Carpenter 32-yard field goal, 10:32. Bills 26–10. **Drive: 8 plays, 34 yards, 4:14.**
- BUF – Dan Carpenter 38-yard field goal, 1:54. Bills 29–10. **Drive: 4 plays, 7 yards, 1:38.**

**Top passers**

- MIA – Ryan Tannehill – 31/49, 241 yards, TD, INT
- BUF – EJ Manuel – 16/26, 202 yards, TD

**Top rushers**

- MIA – Lamar Miller – 11 rushes, 46 yards
- BUF – C. J. Spiller – 12 rushes, 69 yards

**Top receivers**

- MIA – Mike Wallace – 5 receptions, 56 yards, TD
- BUF – Sammy Watkins – 8 receptions, 117 yards, TD

==== Week 3: vs. San Diego Chargers ====
Week Three: San Diego Chargers at Buffalo Bills – Game summary

Quarter	1	2	3	4	Total
**Chargers**	7	6	7	2	**22**
Bills	0	3	7	0	**10**

at Ralph Wilson Stadium, Orchard Park, New York

- Date: September 21
- Game time: 1:00pm EDT
- Game weather: 72 °F (22 °C), partly cloudy
- Game attendance: 68,611
- Referee: John Parry
- TV announcers (CBS): Andrew Catalon, Steve Beuerlein and Steve Tasker
- Recap, Gamebook

Game information

**First quarter**

- SD – Eddie Royal 3-yard pass from Philip Rivers (Nick Novak kick), 9:45. Chargers 7–0. **Drive: 7 plays, 75 yards, 3:18.**

**Second quarter**

- SD – Nick Novak 19-yard field goal, 10:18. Chargers 10–0. **Drive: 17 plays, 89 yards, 7:51.**
- BUF – Dan Carpenter 45-yard field goal, 2:56. Chargers 10–3. **Drive: 8 plays, 65 yards, 2:58.**
- SD – Nick Novak 37-yard field goal, 0:21. Chargers 13–3. **Drive: 7 plays, 61 yards, 2:35.**

**Third quarter**

- SD – Eddie Royal 5-yard pass from Philip Rivers (Nick Novak kick), 7:31. Chargers 20–3. **Drive: 14 plays, 80 yards, 7:29.**
- BUF – Fred Jackson 11-yard pass from EJ Manuel (Dan Carpenter kick), 1:16. Chargers 20–10. **Drive: 11 plays, 67 yards, 6:15.**

**Fourth quarter**

- SD – Penalty on EJ Manuel enforced in the endzone for a safety, 3:23. Chargers 22–10.

**Top passers**

- SD – Philip Rivers – 18/25, 256 yards, 2 TD
- BUF – EJ Manuel – 23/39, 238 yards, TD

**Top rushers**

- SD – Donald Brown – 31 rushes, 62 yards
- BUF – Fred Jackson – 6 rushes, 34 yards

**Top receivers**

- SD – Malcom Floyd – 2 receptions, 98 yards
- BUF – Fred Jackson – 8 receptions, 78 yards, TD

==== Week 4: at Houston Texans ====
Week Four: Buffalo Bills at Houston Texans – Game summary

Quarter	1	2	3	4	Total
Bills	0	10	0	7	**17**
**Texans**	0	7	10	6	**23**

at NRG Stadium, Houston, Texas

- Date: September 28
- Game time: 1:00pm EDT/12:00pm CDT
- Game weather: Played indoors (retractable roof closed)
- Game attendance: 71,756
- Referee: Bill Vinovich
- TV announcers (CBS): Spero Dedes and Solomon Wilcots
- Recap, Gamebook

Game information

**First quarter**

- No scoring plays.

**Second quarter**

- BUF – Dan Carpenter 31-yard field goal, 11:37. Bills 3–0. **Drive: 13 plays, 67 yards, 6:13.**
- BUF – Sammy Watkins 5-yard pass from EJ Manuel (Dan Carpenter kick), 5:54. Bills 10–0. **Drive: 8 plays, 49 yards, 3:56.**
- HOU – DeAndre Hopkins 35-yard pass from Ryan Fitzpatrick (Randy Bullock kick), 0:57. Bills 10–7. **Drive: 8 plays, 80 yards, 2:32.**

**Third quarter**

- HOU – J. J. Watt 80-yard interception return (Randy Bullock kick), 13:28. Texans 14–10.
- HOU – Randy Bullock 41-yard field goal, 6:14. Texans 17–10. **Drive: 12 plays, 42 yards, 6:10.**

**Fourth quarter**

- HOU – Randy Bullock 55-yard field goal, 9:21. Texans 20–10. **Drive: 4 plays, 7 yards, 1:30.**
- BUF – Mike Williams 80-yard pass from EJ Manuel (Dan Carpenter kick), 9:08. Texans 20–17. **Drive: 1 play, 80 yards, 0:13.**
- HOU – Randy Bullock 50-yard field goal, 4:49. Texans 23–17. **Drive: 8 plays, 32 yards, 4:19.**

**Top passers**

- BUF – EJ Manuel – 21/44, 225 yards, 2 TD, 2 INT
- HOU – Ryan Fitzpatrick – 25/37, 268 yards, TD, 2 INT

**Top rushers**

- BUF – C. J. Spiller – 15 rushes, 60 yards
- HOU – Ryan Fitzpatrick – 5 rushes, 14 yards

**Top receivers**

- BUF – Mike Williams – 2 receptions, 84 yards, TD
- HOU – Andre Johnson – 6 receptions, 71 yards

==== Week 5: at Detroit Lions ====
Week Five: Buffalo Bills at Detroit Lions – Game summary

Quarter	1	2	3	4	Total
**Bills**	0	3	3	11	**17**
Lions	7	7	0	0	**14**

at Ford Field, Detroit, Michigan

- Date: October 5
- Game time: 1:00pm EDT
- Game weather: Played indoors (dome stadium)
- Game attendance: 62,775
- Referee: Craig Wrolstad
- TV announcers (Fox): Sam Rosen, Ronde Barber and Jennifer Hale
- Recap, Gamebook

Game information

**First quarter**

- DET – Golden Tate 9-yard pass from Matthew Stafford (Alex Henery kick), 0:05. Lions 7–0. **Drive: 7 plays, 57 yards, 3:38.**

**Second quarter**

- DET – Rashean Mathis 41-yard interception return (Alex Henery kick), 13:44. Lions 14–0.
- BUF – Dan Carpenter 45-yard field goal, 6:51. Lions 14–3. **Drive: 6 plays, 24 yards, 3:38.**

**Third quarter**

- BUF – Dan Carpenter 25-yard field goal, 1:23. Lions 14–6. **Drive: 9 plays, 56 yards, 3:42.**

**Fourth quarter**

- BUF – Chris Gragg 2-yard pass from Kyle Orton (Fred Jackson run), 9:23. Tied 14–14. **Drive: 9 plays, 74 yards, 3:56.**
- BUF – Dan Carpenter 58-yard field goal, 0:04. Bills 17–14. **Drive: 3 plays, 20 yards, 0:17.**

**Top passers**

- BUF – Kyle Orton – 30/43, 308 yards, TD, INT
- DET – Matthew Stafford – 18/31, 231 yards, TD, INT

**Top rushers**

- BUF – Fred Jackson – 10 rushes, 49 yards
- DET – George Winn – 11 rushes, 48 yards

**Top receivers**

- BUF – Sammy Watkins – 7 receptions, 87 yards
- DET – Golden Tate – 7 receptions, 134 yards, TD

==== Week 6: vs. New England Patriots ====
Week Six: New England Patriots at Buffalo Bills – Game summary

Quarter	1	2	3	4	Total
**Patriots**	0	13	10	14	**37**
Bills	0	7	7	8	**22**

at Ralph Wilson Stadium, Orchard Park, New York

- Date: October 12
- Game time: 1:00pm EDT
- Game weather: 55 °F (13 °C), clear & sunny
- Game attendance: 70,185
- Referee: Walt Coleman
- TV announcers (Fox): Kenny Albert, Daryl Johnston and Tony Siragusa
- Recap, Gamebook

Game information

**First quarter**

- No scoring plays.

**Second quarter**

- NE – Tim Wright 1-yard pass from Tom Brady (Stephen Gostkowski kick), 13:04. Patriots 7–0. **Drive: 5 plays, 61 yards, 1:49.**
- BUF – Robert Woods 7-yard pass from Kyle Orton (Dan Carpenter kick), 3:52. Tied 7–7. **Drive: 10 plays, 67 yards, 4:51.**
- NE – Stephen Gostkowski 42-yard field goal, 1:42. Patriots 10–7. **Drive: 4 plays, 0 yards, 0:26.**
- NE – Stephen Gostkowski 53-yard field goal, 0:00. Patriots 13–7. **Drive: 2 plays, 7 yards, 0:06.**

**Third quarter**

- NE – Brian Tyms 43-yard pass from Tom Brady (Stephen Gostkowski kick), 12:30. Patriots 20–7. **Drive: 6 plays, 80 yards, 2:30.**
- BUF – Fred Jackson 1-yard run (Dan Carpenter kick), 5:33. Patriots 20–14. **Drive: 13 plays, 80 yards, 6:57.**
- NE – Stephen Gostkowski 40-yard field goal, 3:08. Patriots 23–14. **Drive: 6 plays, 56 yards, 2:25.**

**Fourth quarter**

- NE – Brandon LaFell 18-yard pass from Tom Brady (Stephen Gostkowski kick), 8:42. Patriots 30–14. **Drive: 12 plays, 80 yards, 6:08.**
- BUF – Chris Hogan 8-yard pass from Kyle Orton (Kyle Orton-Robert Woods pass), 5:58. Patriots 30–22. **Drive: 8 plays, 80 yards, 2:44.**
- NE – Brandon LaFell 56-yard pass from Tom Brady (Stephen Gostkowski kick), 2:49. Patriots 37–22. **Drive: 7 plays, 93 yards, 3:09.**

**Top passers**

- NE – Tom Brady – 27/37, 361 yards, 4 TD
- BUF – Kyle Orton – 24/38, 299 yards, 2 TD, INT

**Top rushers**

- NE – Stevan Ridley – 10 rushes, 23 yards
- BUF – Fred Jackson – 10 rushes, 26 yards, TD

**Top receivers**

- NE – Brandon LaFell – 4 receptions, 97 yards, 2 TD
- BUF – Scott Chandler – 6 receptions, 105 yards

This was the first AFC vs. AFC game to air on Fox.

==== Week 7: vs. Minnesota Vikings ====
Week Seven: Minnesota Vikings at Buffalo Bills – Game summary

Quarter	1	2	3	4	Total
Vikings	3	10	0	3	**16**
**Bills**	0	10	0	7	**17**

at Ralph Wilson Stadium, Orchard Park, New York

- Date: October 19
- Game time: 1:00pm EDT
- Game weather: 41 °F (5 °C), cloudy
- Game attendance: 68,477
- Referee: Ed Hochuli
- TV announcers (Fox): Tim Brando, Brendon Ayanbadejo and Peter Schrager
- Recap, Gamebook

Game information

**First quarter**

- MIN – Blair Walsh 40-yard field goal, 1:50. Vikings 3–0. **Drive: 4 plays, 5 yards, 1:59.**

**Second quarter**

- BUF – Sammy Watkins 26-yard pass from Kyle Orton (Dan Carpenter kick), 9:23. Bills 7–3. **Drive: 1 play, 26 yards, 0:05.**
- MIN – Cordarrelle Patterson 4-yard pass from Teddy Bridgewater (Blair Walsh kick), 6:17. Vikings 10–7. **Drive: 5 plays, 60 yards, 3:06.**
- BUF – Dan Carpenter 31-yard field goal, 4:01. Tied 10–10. **Drive: 6 plays, 66 yards, 2:16.**
- MIN – Blair Walsh 55-yard field goal, 0:15. Vikings 13–10. **Drive: 5 plays, 22 yards, 1:04.**

**Third quarter**

- No scoring plays.

**Fourth quarter**

- MIN – Blair Walsh 33-yard field goal, 11:45. Vikings 16–10. **Drive: 12 plays, 36 yards, 5:43.**
- BUF – Sammy Watkins 2-yard pass from Kyle Orton (Dan Carpenter kick), 0:01. Bills 17–16. **Drive: 15 plays, 80 yards, 3:06.**

**Top passers**

- MIN – Teddy Bridgewater – 15/26, 157 yards, TD
- BUF – Kyle Orton – 31/43, 283 yards, 2 TD

**Top rushers**

- MIN – Jerick McKinnon – 19 rushes, 103 yards
- BUF – C. J. Spiller – 1 rush, 53 yards

**Top receivers**

- MIN – Greg Jennings – 6 receptions, 77 yards
- BUF – Sammy Watkins – 9 receptions, 122 yards, 2 TD

==== Week 8: at New York Jets ====
Week Eight: Buffalo Bills at New York Jets – Game summary

Quarter	1	2	3	4	Total
**Bills**	14	10	6	13	**43**
Jets	0	17	0	6	**23**

at MetLife Stadium, East Rutherford, New Jersey

- Date: October 26
- Game time: 1:00pm EDT
- Game weather: 59 °F (15 °C), mostly cloudy
- Game attendance: 78,160
- Referee: Gene Steratore
- TV announcers (CBS): Kevin Harlan and Rich Gannon
- Recap, Gamebook

Game information

**First quarter**

- BUF – Robert Woods 22-yard pass from Kyle Orton (Dan Carpenter kick), 9:37. Bills 7–0. **Drive: 7 plays, 64 yards, 3:45.**
- BUF – Lee Smith 1-yard pass from Kyle Orton (Dan Carpenter kick), 4:36. Bills 14–0. **Drive: 1 play, 1 yard, 0:04.**

**Second quarter**

- NYJ – Chris Ivory 2-yard run (Nick Folk kick), 14:22. Bills 14–7. **Drive: 13 plays, 76 yards, 5:14.**
- BUF – Frank Summers 2-yard run (Dan Carpenter kick), 11:50. Bills 21–7. **Drive: 5 plays, 92 yards, 2:32.**
- BUF – Dan Carpenter 53-yard field goal, 6:16. Bills 24–7. **Drive: 4 plays, -4 yards, 1:18.**
- NYJ – Chris Ivory 2-yard run (Nick Folk kick), 1:50. Bills 24–14. **Drive: 11 plays, 74 yards, 4:26.**
- NYJ – Nick Folk 55-yard field goal, 0:00. Bills 24–17. **Drive: 5 plays, 21 yards, 0:33.**

**Third quarter**

- BUF – Dan Carpenter 36-yard field goal, 8:31. Bills 27–17. **Drive: 4 plays, 9 yards, 1:39.**
- BUF – Dan Carpenter 29-yard field goal, 1:11. Bills 30–17. **Drive: 4 plays, -1 yards, 1:22.**

**Fourth quarter**

- BUF – Scott Chandler 12-yard pass from Kyle Orton (Dan Carpenter kick), 14:11. Bills 37–17. **Drive: 3 plays, 14 yards, 1:05.**
- BUF – Sammy Watkins 61-yard pass from Kyle Orton (kick failed), 9:46. Bills 43–17. **Drive: 4 plays, 71 yards, 2:21.**
- NYJ – Bilal Powell 3-yard run (pass failed), 4:06. Bills 43–23. **Drive: 17 plays, 80 yards, 5:40.**

**Top passers**

- BUF – Kyle Orton – 10/17, 238 yards, 4 TD
- NYJ – Michael Vick – 18/36, 153 yards, INT

**Top rushers**

- BUF – Anthony Dixon – 22 rushes, 44 yards
- NYJ – Michael Vick – 8 rushes, 69 yards

**Top receivers**

- BUF – Sammy Watkins – 3 receptions, 157 yards, TD
- NYJ – Jace Amaro – 5 receptions, 51 yards

==== Week 10: vs. Kansas City Chiefs ====
Week Ten: Kansas City Chiefs at Buffalo Bills – Game summary

Quarter	1	2	3	4	Total
**Chiefs**	3	0	0	14	**17**
Bills	7	3	3	0	**13**

at Ralph Wilson Stadium, Orchard Park, New York

- Date: November 9
- Game time: 1:00pm EST
- Game weather: 42 °F (6 °C), cloudy
- Game attendance: 68,119
- Referee: Brad Allen
- TV announcers (CBS): Spero Dedes and Solomon Wilcots
- Recap, Gamebook

Game information

**First quarter**

- BUF – Chris Hogan 25-yard pass from Kyle Orton (Dan Carpenter kick), 9:51. Bills 7–0. **Drive: 7 plays, 51 yards, 3:00.**
- KC – Cairo Santos 36-yard field goal, 5:24. Bills 7–3. **Drive: 10 plays, 62 yards, 4:27.**

**Second quarter**

- BUF – Dan Carpenter 26-yard field goal, 7:09. Bills 10–3. **Drive: 9 plays, 23 yards, 3:57.**

**Third quarter**

- BUF – Dan Carpenter 21-yard field goal, 3:06. Bills 13–3. **Drive: 11 plays, 73 yards, 5:02.**

**Fourth quarter**

- KC – Jamaal Charles 39-yard run (Cairo Santos kick), 13:30. Bills 13–10. **Drive: 10 plays, 80 yards, 4:36.**
- KC – Alex Smith 8-yard run (Cairo Santos kick), 8:59. Chiefs 17–13. **Drive: 2 plays, 26 yards, 0:45.**

**Top passers**

- KC – Alex Smith – 17/29, 177 yards
- BUF – Kyle Orton – 29/48, 259 yards, TD

**Top rushers**

- KC – Jamaal Charles – 15 rushes, 98 yards, TD
- BUF – Anthony Dixon – 9 rushes, 62 yards

**Top receivers**

- KC – Dwayne Bowe – 8 receptions, 93 yards
- BUF – Bryce Brown – 6 receptions, 65 yards

==== Week 11: at Miami Dolphins ====
Week Eleven: Buffalo Bills at Miami Dolphins – Game summary

Quarter	1	2	3	4	Total
Bills	3	3	3	0	**9**
**Dolphins**	3	0	9	10	**22**

at Sun Life Stadium, Miami Gardens, Florida

- Date: November 13
- Game time: 8:25pm EST
- Game weather: 74 °F (23 °C), clear
- Game attendance: 71,573
- Referee: Walt Coleman
- TV announcers (NFLN): Jim Nantz, Phil Simms and Tracy Wolfson
- Recap, Gamebook

Game information

**First quarter**

- MIA – Caleb Sturgis 38-yard field goal, 6:40. Dolphins 3–0. **Drive: 14 plays, 68 yards, 8:20.**
- BUF – Dan Carpenter 33-yard field goal, 0:13. Tied 3–3. **Drive: 14 plays, 67 yards, 6:27.**

**Second quarter**

- BUF – Dan Carpenter 21-yard field goal, 3:26. Bills 6–3. **Drive: 17 plays, 85 yards, 9:24.**

**Third quarter**

- BUF – Dan Carpenter 46-yard field goal, 6:26. Bills 9–3. **Drive: 8 plays, 49 yards, 3:27.**
- MIA – Brandon Gibson 7-yard pass from Ryan Tannehill (Caleb Sturgis kick), 2:18. Dolphins 10–9. **Drive: 9 plays, 80 yards, 4:08.**
- MIA – Penalty on Kyle Orton enforced in the endzone for a safety, 1:08. Dolphins 12–9.

**Fourth quarter**

- MIA – Jarvis Landry 8-yard pass from Ryan Tannehill (Caleb Sturgis kick), 11:35. Dolphins 19–9. **Drive: 6 plays, 63 yards, 3:18.**
- MIA – Caleb Sturgis 38-yard field goal, 3:01. Dolphins 22–9. **Drive: 4 plays, -2 yards, 0:18.**

**Top passers**

- BUF – Kyle Orton – 22/39, 193 yards
- MIA – Ryan Tannehill – 26/34, 240 yards, 2 TD

**Top rushers**

- BUF – Anthony Dixon – 10 rushes, 35 yards
- MIA – Lamar Miller – 15 rushes, 86 yards

**Top receivers**

- BUF – Chris Hogan – 7 receptions, 74 yards
- MIA – Brian Hartline – 3 receptions, 55 yards

==== Week 12: vs. New York Jets ====
Week Twelve: New York Jets at Buffalo Bills – Game summary

Quarter	1	2	3	4	Total
Jets	3	0	0	0	**3**
**Bills**	7	7	17	7	**38**

at Ford Field, Detroit, Michigan

- Date: November 24
- Game time: 7:00pm EST
- Game weather: Played indoors (dome stadium)
- Game attendance: 56,044
- Referee: Pete Morelli
- TV announcers (CBS): Spero Dedes and Solomon Wilcots
- Recap, Gamebook

Game information

**First quarter**

- BUF – Robert Woods 7-yard pass from Kyle Orton (Dan Carpenter kick), 8:04. Bills 7–0. **Drive: 9 plays, 44 yards, 5:17.**
- NYJ – Nick Folk 27-yard field goal, 1:01. Bills 7–3. **Drive: 9 plays, 28 yards, 4:16.**

**Second quarter**

- BUF – Scott Chandler 19-yard pass from Kyle Orton (Dan Carpenter kick), 0:43. Bills 14–3. **Drive: 13 plays, 90 yards, 5:04.**

**Third quarter**

- BUF – Dan Carpenter 53-yard field goal, 9:45. Bills 17–3. **Drive: 11 plays, 45 yards, 5:15.**
- BUF – Manny Lawson blocked punt recovery in endzone (Dan Carpenter kick), 7:57. Bills 24–3.
- BUF – Fred Jackson 5-yard run (Dan Carpenter kick), 5:03. Bills 31–3. **Drive: 2 plays, 16 yards, 0:49.**

**Fourth quarter**

- BUF – Anthony Dixon 30-yard run (Dan Carpenter kick), 5:53. Bills 38–3. **Drive: 7 plays, 91 yards, 4:12.**

**Top passers**

- NYJ – Geno Smith – 10/12, 89 yards
- BUF – Kyle Orton – 24/32, 230 yards, 2 TD

**Top rushers**

- NYJ – Chris Johnson – 7 rushes, 40 yards
- BUF – Anthony Dixon – 12 rushes, 54 yards, TD

**Top receivers**

- NYJ – Jeremy Kerley – 5 receptions, 66 yards
- BUF – Robert Woods – 9 receptions, 118 yards, TD

==== Week 13: vs. Cleveland Browns ====
Week Thirteen: Cleveland Browns at Buffalo Bills – Game summary

Quarter	1	2	3	4	Total
Browns	3	0	0	7	**10**
**Bills**	0	0	17	9	**26**

at Ralph Wilson Stadium, Orchard Park, New York

- Date: November 30
- Game time: 1:00pm EST
- Game weather: 57 °F (14 °C), cloudy
- Game attendance: 68,576
- Referee: Jerome Boger
- TV announcers (CBS): Greg Gumbel, Trent Green and Evan Washburn
- Recap, Gamebook

Game information

**First quarter**

- CLE – Billy Cundiff 22-yard field goal, 4:51. Browns 3–0. **Drive: 15 plays, 91 yards, 6:03.**

**Second quarter**

- No scoring plays.

**Third quarter**

- BUF – Chris Hogan 3-yard pass from Kyle Orton (Dan Carpenter kick), 8:04. Bills 7–3. **Drive: 8 plays, 84 yards, 4:09.**
- BUF – Jerry Hughes 18-yard fumble return (Dan Carpenter kick), 7:54. Bills 14–3.

**Fourth quarter**

- BUF – Dan Carpenter 49-yard field goal, 13:41. Bills 17–3. **Drive: 6 plays, 17 yards, 3:01.**
- BUF – Dan Carpenter 34-yard field goal, 12:01. Bills 20–3. **Drive: 4 plays, 5 yards, 0:58.**
- CLE – Johnny Manziel 10-yard run (Billy Cundiff kick), 8:47. Bills 20–10. **Drive: 8 plays, 80 yards, 3:14.**
- BUF – Dan Carpenter 34-yard field goal, 3:32. Bills 23–10. **Drive: 10 plays, 64 yards, 5:15.**
- BUF – Dan Carpenter 35-yard field goal, 0:27. Bills 26–10. **Drive: 4 plays, 6 yards, 2:16.**

**Top passers**

- CLE – Brian Hoyer – 18/30, 192 yards, 2 INT
- BUF – Kyle Orton – 17/31, 190 yards, TD, 2 INT

**Top rushers**

- CLE – Terrance West – 7 rushes, 32 yards
- BUF – Fred Jackson – 21 rushes, 70 yards

**Top receivers**

- CLE – Miles Austin – 7 receptions, 86 yards
- BUF – Robert Woods – 4 receptions, 71 yards

This was the 1st time the Bills have had a winning record this late in the season since 2008

==== Week 14: at Denver Broncos ====
Week Fourteen: Buffalo Bills at Denver Broncos – Game summary

Quarter	1	2	3	4	Total
Bills	0	3	0	14	**17**
**Broncos**	7	7	10	0	**24**

at Sports Authority Field at Mile High, Denver, Colorado

- Date: December 7
- Game time: 4:05pm EST/2:05pm MST
- Game weather: 63 °F (17 °C), mostly sunny
- Game attendance: 76,913
- Referee: Ron Torbert
- TV announcers (CBS): Kevin Harlan and Rich Gannon
- Recap, Gamebook

Game information

**First quarter**

- DEN – C. J. Anderson 6-yard run (Connor Barth kick), 2:43. Broncos 7–0. **Drive: 5 plays, 61 yards, 2:52.**

**Second quarter**

- BUF – Dan Carpenter 44-yard field goal, 11:51. Broncos 7–3. **Drive: 12 plays, 55 yards, 5:52.**
- DEN – C. J. Anderson 1-yard run (Connor Barth kick), 3:26. Broncos 14–3. **Drive: 10 plays, 60 yards, 5:27.**

**Third quarter**

- DEN – C. J. Anderson 3-yard run (Connor Barth kick), 12:01. Broncos 21–3. **Drive: 5 plays, 80 yards, 2:59.**
- DEN – Connor Barth 50-yard field goal, 1:07. Broncos 24–3. **Drive: 8 plays, 28 yards, 3:49.**

**Fourth quarter**

- BUF – Chris Hogan 14-yard pass from Kyle Orton (Dan Carpenter kick), 10:46. Broncos 24–10. **Drive: 13 plays, 80 yards, 5:21.**
- BUF – Kyle Orton 1-yard run (Dan Carpenter kick), 0:55. Broncos 24–17. **Drive: 17 plays, 90 yards, 3:25.**

**Top passers**

- BUF – Kyle Orton – 38/57, 355 yards, TD, 2 INT
- DEN – Peyton Manning – 14/20, 173 yards, 2 INT

**Top rushers**

- BUF – Fred Jackson – 8 rushes, 35 yards
- DEN – Juwan Thompson – 4 rushes, 63 yards

**Top receivers**

- BUF – Sammy Watkins – 7 receptions, 127 yards
- DEN – Wes Welker – 6 receptions, 82 yards

==== Week 15: vs. Green Bay Packers ====
Week Fifteen: Green Bay Packers at Buffalo Bills – Game summary

Quarter	1	2	3	4	Total
Packers	3	7	0	3	**13**
**Bills**	7	3	6	5	**21**

at Ralph Wilson Stadium, Orchard Park, New York

- Date: December 14
- Game time: 1:00pm EST
- Game weather: 38 °F (3 °C), partly cloudy
- Game attendance: 70,214
- Referee: Bill Leavy
- TV announcers (Fox): Justin Kutcher, David Diehl and Laura Okmin
- Recap, Gamebook

Game information

**First quarter**

- GB – Mason Crosby 45-yard field goal, 4:27. Packers 3–0. **Drive: 10 plays, 53 yards, 3:24.**
- BUF – Marcus Thigpen 75-yard punt return (Dan Carpenter kick), 2:09. Bills 7–3.

**Second quarter**

- GB – Eddie Lacy 1-yard run (Mason Crosby kick), 14:14. Packers 10–7. **Drive: 7 plays, 80 yards, 2:55.**
- BUF – Dan Carpenter 27-yard field goal, 8:04. Tied 10–10. **Drive: 10 plays, 71 yards, 6:10.**

**Third quarter**

- BUF – Dan Carpenter 51-yard field goal, 9:21. Bills 13–10. **Drive: 11 plays, 40 yards, 5:39.**
- BUF – Dan Carpenter 35-yard field goal, 4:18. Bills 16–10. **Drive: 8 plays, 61 yards, 3:18.**

**Fourth quarter**

- BUF – Dan Carpenter 48-yard field goal, 9:23. Bills 19–10. **Drive: 5 plays, 22 yards, 1:40.**
- GB – Mason Crosby 34-yard field goal, 4:51. Bills 19–13. **Drive: 9 plays, 66 yards, 4:32.**
- BUF – Eddie Lacy tackled in the endzone by Nickell Robey for a safety, 1:51. Bills 21–13.

**Top passers**

- GB – Aaron Rodgers – 17/42, 185 yards, 2 INT
- BUF – Kyle Orton – 14/27, 158 yards, INT

**Top rushers**

- GB – Eddie Lacy – 15 rushes, 97 yards, TD
- BUF – Fred Jackson – 20 rushes, 71 yards

**Top receivers**

- GB – Randall Cobb – 7 receptions, 96 yards
- BUF – Bryce Brown – 1 reception, 40 yards

The Bills were the only AFC East team to defeat all of their NFC North opponents. The Bills also improved their record to 6–0 against the Packers at home.

==== Week 16: at Oakland Raiders ====
Week Sixteen: Buffalo Bills at Oakland Raiders – Game summary

Quarter	1	2	3	4	Total
Bills	7	3	0	14	**24**
**Raiders**	0	13	6	7	**26**

at O.co Coliseum, Oakland, California

- Date: December 21
- Game time: 4:25pm EST/1:25pm PST
- Game weather: 64 °F (18 °C), cloudy
- Game attendance: 53,436
- Referee: Craig Wrolstad
- TV announcers (CBS): Brian Anderson and Chris Simms
- Recap, Gamebook

Game information

**First quarter**

- BUF – Sammy Watkins 42-yard pass from Kyle Orton (Dan Carpenter kick), 9:45. Bills 7–0. **Drive: 7 plays, 60 yards, 4:29.**

**Second quarter**

- OAK – James Jones 3-yard pass from Derek Carr (Sebastian Janikowski kick), 14:56. Tied 7–7. **Drive: 6 plays, 64 yards, 2:31.**
- OAK – Sebastian Janikowski 54-yard field goal, 8:09. Raiders 10–7. **Drive: 8 plays, 31 yards, 4:02.**
- OAK – Sebastian Janikowski 36-yard field goal, 1:11. Raiders 13–7. **Drive: 8 plays, 41 yards, 3:05.**
- BUF – Dan Carpenter 54-yard field goal, 0:00. Raiders 13–10. **Drive: 8 plays, 41 yards, 1:11.**

**Third quarter**

- OAK – Sebastian Janikowski 38-yard field goal, 10:18. Raiders 16–10. **Drive: 7 plays, 45 yards, 2:54.**
- OAK – Sebastian Janikowski 49-yard field goal, 2:36. Raiders 19–10. **Drive: 12 plays, 49 yards, 5:49.**

**Fourth quarter**

- BUF – Scott Chandler 29-yard pass from Kyle Orton (Dan Carpenter kick), 14:54. Raiders 19–17. **Drive: 7 plays, 83 yards, 2:42.**
- OAK – Jamize Olawale 1-yard pass from Derek Carr (Sebastian Janikowski kick), 2:51. Raiders 26–17. **Drive: 10 plays, 80 yards, 5:22.**
- BUF – Robert Woods 30-yard pass from Kyle Orton (Dan Carpenter kick), 1:09. Raiders 26–24. **Drive: 4 plays, 64 yards, 0:46.**

**Top passers**

- BUF – Kyle Orton – 32/49, 329 yards, 3 TD, 2 INT
- OAK – Derek Carr – 17/34, 214 yards, 2 TD

**Top rushers**

- BUF – Fred Jackson – 6 rushes, 10 yards
- OAK – Latavius Murray – 23 rushes, 86 yards

**Top receivers**

- BUF – Fred Jackson – 9 receptions, 93 yards
- OAK – Kenbrell Thompkins – 5 receptions, 90 yards

This loss eliminated Buffalo from playoff contention.

==== Week 17: at New England Patriots ====
Week Seventeen: Buffalo Bills at New England Patriots – Game summary

Quarter	1	2	3	4	Total
**Bills**	7	10	0	0	**17**
Patriots	3	3	3	0	**9**

at Gillette Stadium, Foxborough, Massachusetts

- Date: December 28
- Game time: 1:00pm EST
- Game weather: 49 °F (9 °C), mostly cloudy
- Game attendance: 68,756
- Referee: Terry McAulay
- TV announcers (CBS): Spero Dedes and Solomon Wilcots
- Recap, Gamebook

Game information

**First quarter**

- BUF – Robert Woods 6-yard pass from Kyle Orton (Dan Carpenter kick), 11:59. Bills 7–0. **Drive: 6 plays, 80 yards, 3:01.**
- NE – Stephen Gostkowski 24-yard field goal, 3:02. Bills 7–3. **Drive: 13 plays, 80 yards, 5:33.**

**Second quarter**

- BUF – Anthony Dixon 1-yard run (Dan Carpenter kick), 10:38. Bills 14–3. **Drive: 13 plays, 80 yards, 7:24.**
- NE – Stephen Gostkowski 44-yard field goal, 5:07. Bills 14–6. **Drive: 8 plays, 18 yards, 3:24.**
- BUF – Dan Carpenter 48-yard field goal, 2:14. Bills 17–6. **Drive: 7 plays, 17 yards, 2:53.**

**Third quarter**

- NE – Stephen Gostkowski 35-yard field goal, 0:37. Bills 17–9. **Drive: 5 plays, 27 yards, 2:18.**

**Fourth quarter**

- No scoring plays.

**Top passers**

- BUF – Kyle Orton – 16/23, 176 yards, TD
- NE – Jimmy Garoppolo – 10/17, 90 yards

**Top rushers**

- BUF – Fred Jackson – 18 rushes, 58 yards
- NE – LeGarrette Blount – 10 rushes, 62 yards

**Top receivers**

- BUF – Sammy Watkins – 3 receptions, 57 yards
- NE – Brandon LaFell – 4 receptions, 70 yards

This was the first time Buffalo won in New England since November 5, 2000.

== Standings ==
=== Division ===
AFC East
	W	L	T	PCT	DIV	CONF	PF	PA	STK
^{(1)} New England Patriots	12	4	0	.750	4–2	9–3	468	313	L1
Buffalo Bills	9	7	0	.563	4–2	5–7	343	289	W1
Miami Dolphins	8	8	0	.500	3–3	6–6	388	373	L1
New York Jets	4	12	0	.250	1–5	4–8	283	401	W1

=== Conference ===
AFC
#	Team	Division	W	L	T	PCT	DIV	CONF	SOS	SOV	STK
Division leaders
1 (Note: New England defeated Denver head-to-head (Week 9, 43–21).)	New England Patriots	East	12	4	0	.750	4–2	9–3	.514	.487	L1
2	Denver Broncos	West	12	4	0	.750	6–0	10–2	.521	.484	W1
3 (Note: Pittsburgh defeated Indianapolis head-to-head (Week 8, 51–34).)	Pittsburgh Steelers	North	11	5	0	.688	4–2	9–3	.451	.486	W4
4	Indianapolis Colts	South	11	5	0	.688	6–0	9–3	.479	.372	W1
Wild Cards
5	Cincinnati Bengals	North	10	5	1	.656	3–3	7–5	.498	.425	L1
6	Baltimore Ravens	North	10	6	0	.625	3–3	6–6	.475	.378	W1
Did not qualify for the postseason
7 (Note: Kansas City finished ahead of San Diego in the AFC West based on head-to-head sweep (Week 7, 23–20; Week 17, 19–7). Houston finished ahead of Kansas City and Buffalo based on conference record. Kansas City finished ahead of Buffalo based on head-to-head victory (Week 10, 17–13). San Diego finished ahead of Buffalo based on head-to-head victory (Week 3, 22–10).)	Houston Texans	South	9	7	0	.563	4–2	8–4	.447	.299	W2
8	Kansas City Chiefs	West	9	7	0	.563	3–3	7–5	.512	.500	W1
9	San Diego Chargers	West	9	7	0	.563	2–4	6–6	.512	.403	L1
10	Buffalo Bills	East	9	7	0	.563	4–2	5–7	.516	.486	W1
11	Miami Dolphins	East	8	8	0	.500	3–3	6–6	.512	.406	L1
12	Cleveland Browns	North	7	9	0	.438	2–4	4–8	.479	.371	L5
13	New York Jets	East	4	12	0	.250	1–5	4–8	.543	.375	W1
14 (Note: Jacksonville finished ahead of Oakland based on record vs. common opponents (1–4 to 0–5).)	Jacksonville Jaguars	South	3	13	0	.188	1–5	2–10	.514	.313	L1
15	Oakland Raiders	West	3	13	0	.188	1–5	2–10	.570	.542	L1
16	Tennessee Titans	South	2	14	0	.125	1–5	2–10	.506	.375	L10
Tiebreakers (Note: When breaking ties for three or more teams under the NFL's rules, they are first broken within divisions, then comparing only the highest ranked remaining team from each division.)

== Fist bump controversy ==
After a touchdown by Denver Broncos' running back C. J. Anderson during the December 7 game, two officials acknowledged the call through the use of a fist bump. The move was seen by many Bills fans and players, including defensive back Aaron Williams, as an insensitive gesture, with some likening the gesture to a conspiracy. However, the NFL responded saying the gesture was "an acknowledgment of good mechanics between the two officials involved in making the call."
