= Ross Cockrell =

American football player (born August 6th 1991)

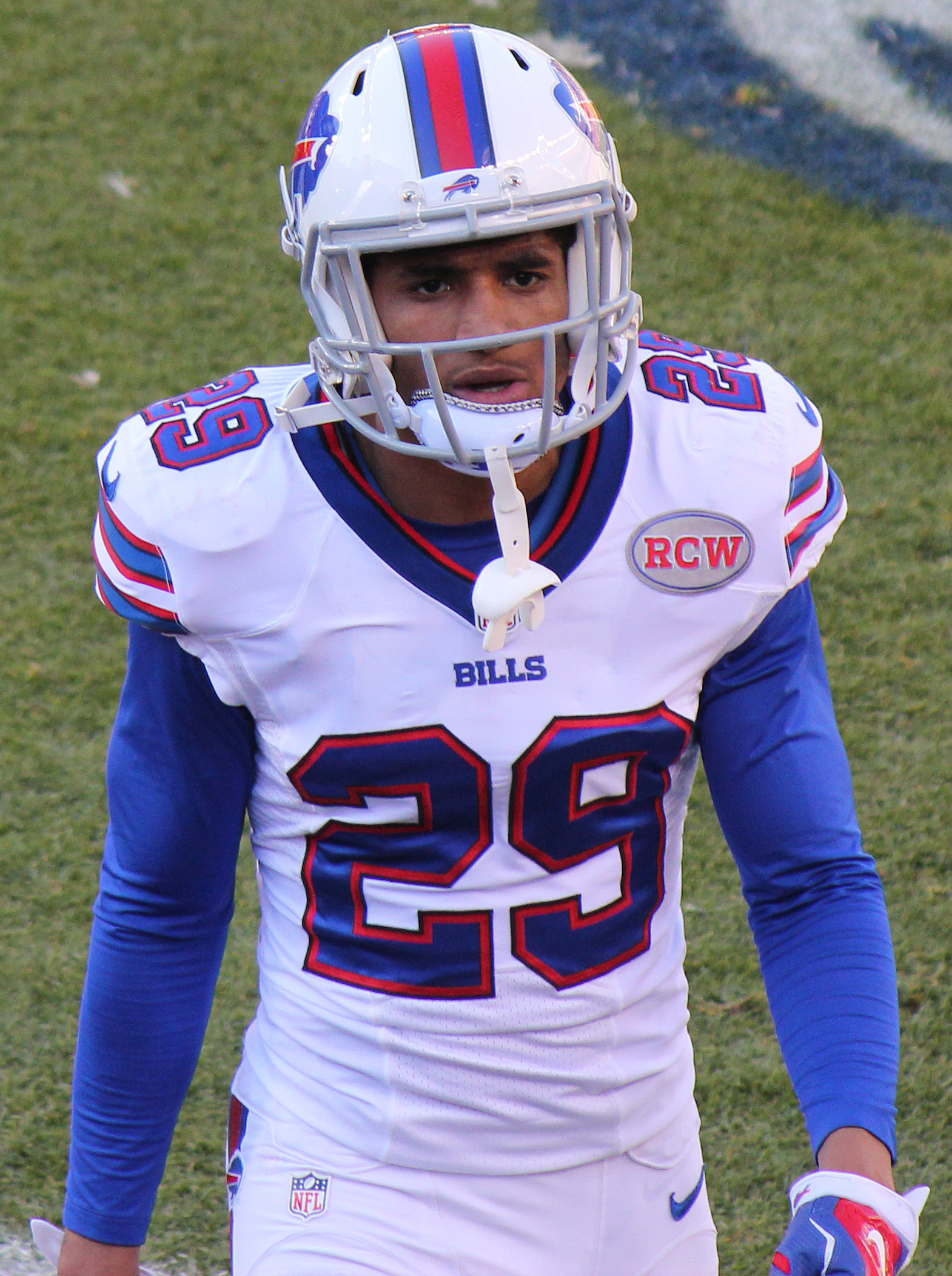
- Cockrell with the Buffalo Bills in 2014

No. 29, 31, 37, 47, 43
- Position: Cornerback

Personal information
- Born: August 6, 1991 (age 35); Farmington Hills, Michigan, U.S.
- Listed height: 6 ft 0 in (1.83 m)
- Listed weight: 191 lb (87 kg)

Career information
- High school: Charlotte Latin School (Charlotte, North Carolina)
- College: Duke (2009–2013)
- NFL draft: 2014: 4th round, 109th overall pick

Career history
- Buffalo Bills (2014); Pittsburgh Steelers (2015–2016); New York Giants (2017); Carolina Panthers (2018–2019); Tampa Bay Buccaneers (2020–2021)

Awards and highlights
- Super Bowl champion (LV); 2× First-team All-ACC (2012, 2013)

Career NFL statistics
- Total tackles: 273
- Forced fumbles: 2
- Fumble recoveries: 2
- Pass deflections: 52
- Interceptions: 7
- Stats at Pro Football Reference

Ross Cockrell (born August 6, 1991) is an American former professional football player who was a cornerback in the National Football League (NFL). He was selected by the Buffalo Bills in the fourth round of the 2014 NFL draft. He played college football for the Duke Blue Devils.

== Early life ==
Cockrell was born on August 6, 1991, to Serena and Kieth Cockrell. His father was a college athlete and played football for Columbia University. His younger sister, Anna, is a sprinter and hurdler who competed in the 2020 Summer Olympics.

Cockrell attended Walt Whitman High School in Bethesda, Maryland and later Charlotte Latin High School in Charlotte, North Carolina, where he was selected to the all-conference and all-state teams twice. In his senior season, he had 29 receptions for 459 yards and 11 touchdowns while posting 34 tackles and three interceptions helping lead Latin to the state championship game.

He also ran for the Charlotte Latin High School track team. He won the 100 meters at the 2008 CISAA championships, with a career-best time of 10.88 seconds. Also a top competitor in the 400 meters, he won the NCISAA 3A State championships with a personal-best time of 48.42 seconds.

Considered a three-star recruit by Rivals.com, he was rated as the 76th best cornerback prospect of his class.

== College career ==
In 2010, Cockrell was selected to the Freshman All-American third team by Phil Steele in his freshman season. He was named to the Academic All-Atlantic Coast Conference (ACC) as a freshman. In his sophomore season, he was a recipient of the Sonny Falcone Iron Duke Award. He was an Honorable mention All-America by Sports Illustrated in his junior season. Cockrell was selected to the first team All-ACC following his junior season. He won the Willis Aldridge Award following his junior season in 2011. He was selected to the first team Capital One Academic All-District III also in his junior season. Also in his junior season, he was selected to the Academic All-ACC. He was selected to the consensus preseason first team All-ACC by Sporting News, Phil Steele’s College Football Preview, Lindy’s Sports, Athlon Sports and USA Today prior to his senior season. On May 16, 2013, Cockrell was named to Lott IMPACT Trophy Watch List prior to his senior season. Cockrell graduated from Duke that same month with a degree in political science and received a certificate in markets and management studies.

== Professional career ==
=== Pre-draft ===
Entering the 2014 NFL draft, many analysts and scouts had Cockrell projected as a third or fourth round draft choice. He was described as agile, consistent, aware, with good anticipation and a good feel for the game. The main issues that worried scouts were physical attributes like having small hands, a skinny lower body, thin frame, short arms, and his lack of strength during press coverage and taking on blocks. He attended the NFL Combine in Indianapolis and was able to perform all the drills well. Although he had a good showing at the combine, Cockrell decided to participate in all the events during Duke's Pro Day. He was able to improve on all of his combine numbers, including a sub-4.40 in the 40-yard dash, 12 bench presses of 225 lbs, and a 39-inch vertical jump.

Pre-draft measurables
Height	Weight	Arm length	Hand span	40-yard dash	10-yard split	20-yard split	20-yard shuttle	Three-cone drill	Vertical jump	Broad jump	Bench press
6 ft 0 in (1.83 m)	191 lb (87 kg)	29 7/8 in (0.76 m)	9 in (0.23 m)	4.44 s	1.50 s	2.63 s	4.27 s	6.88 s	39.0 in (0.99 m)	10 ft 5 in (3.18 m)	12 reps
All values from NFL Combine/Pro Day

=== Buffalo Bills ===
Cockrell was selected in the fourth round with the 109th overall pick in the 2014 NFL draft by the Buffalo Bills. It made him the highest Duke football player drafted since Lennie Friedman with the 61st selection of the 1999 NFL draft. On May 15, 2014, the Bills signed Cockrell to a four-year, $2.68 million rookie contract.

On August 31, 2015, Cockrell was released by the Bills.

=== Pittsburgh Steelers ===
On September 5, 2015, Cockrell signed with the Pittsburgh Steelers. Despite signing with the team five days before the opening game of the 2015 NFL season, he received significant playing time that year, beginning in the Steelers' second regular season game against the San Francisco 49ers. On October 1, 2015, he intercepted his first career pass from Baltimore Ravens' quarterback Joe Flacco and returned it for 37-yards. The following game, he collected a season-high 7 solo tackles against the San Diego Chargers. On the year, he played 62% of the Steelers' defensive snaps. During the regular season he recorded 44 tackles, 11 passes defensed, two interceptions, one forced fumble, and recovered one fumble. In his first season with the Steelers, Cockrell played in 15 regular season games, and started in seven of those.

On January 22, 2016, the Steelers signed Cockrell to a one-year contract extension worth $600,000. He began the season as the Steeler's second cornerback, opposite longtime veteran William Gay. In the season opener against the Washington Redskins, he made four combined tackles in the Steelers 38–16 victory. On October 9, 2016, Cockrell collected four solo tackles and three pass deflections during the Steelers 31–13 rout of the New York Jets. The following week, he made a season-high five solo tackles and two pass deflections in a 30–15 loss to the Miami Dolphins. On November 13, 2016, he made four solo tackles, an assisted tackle, and a pass deflection during a 35–30 loss to the Dallas Cowboys. Three days later, he was fined $9,115 for a late hit against Lucky Whitehead during the loss to the Cowboys.

On December 25, 2016, Cockrell recorded a season-high seven combined tackles as the Steelers defeated the Baltimore Ravens 31–27 and clinched the AFC North. He finished the 2016 season with a career-high 62 combined tackles, 14 pass deflections, and 16 regular season starts. On January 8, 2017, Cockrell started in his first career postseason game and made eight solo tackles in a 30–12 AFC wild card game victory over the Dolphins.

=== New York Giants ===
On September 2, 2017, Cockrell was traded to the New York Giants after the Pittsburgh Steelers signed cornerback Joe Haden after his release by the Cleveland Browns.

=== Carolina Panthers ===
On March 23, 2018, Cockrell signed a two-year contract with the Carolina Panthers. During training camp on July 30, 2018, Cockrell suffered a broken left tibia and fibula which required surgery. He was placed on injured reserve two days later.

In Week 3 of the 2019 season against the Houston Texans, Cockrell intercepted a pass thrown by wide receiver DeAndre Hopkins and returned it for 37 yards in the 16–10 win. In Week 6 against the Tampa Bay Buccaneers, Cockrell intercepted a pass from Jameis Winston in the 37–26 win.

After becoming a free agent in March 2020, Cockrell visited the New York Giants on August 8, 2020, but did not sign with the team.

=== Tampa Bay Buccaneers ===
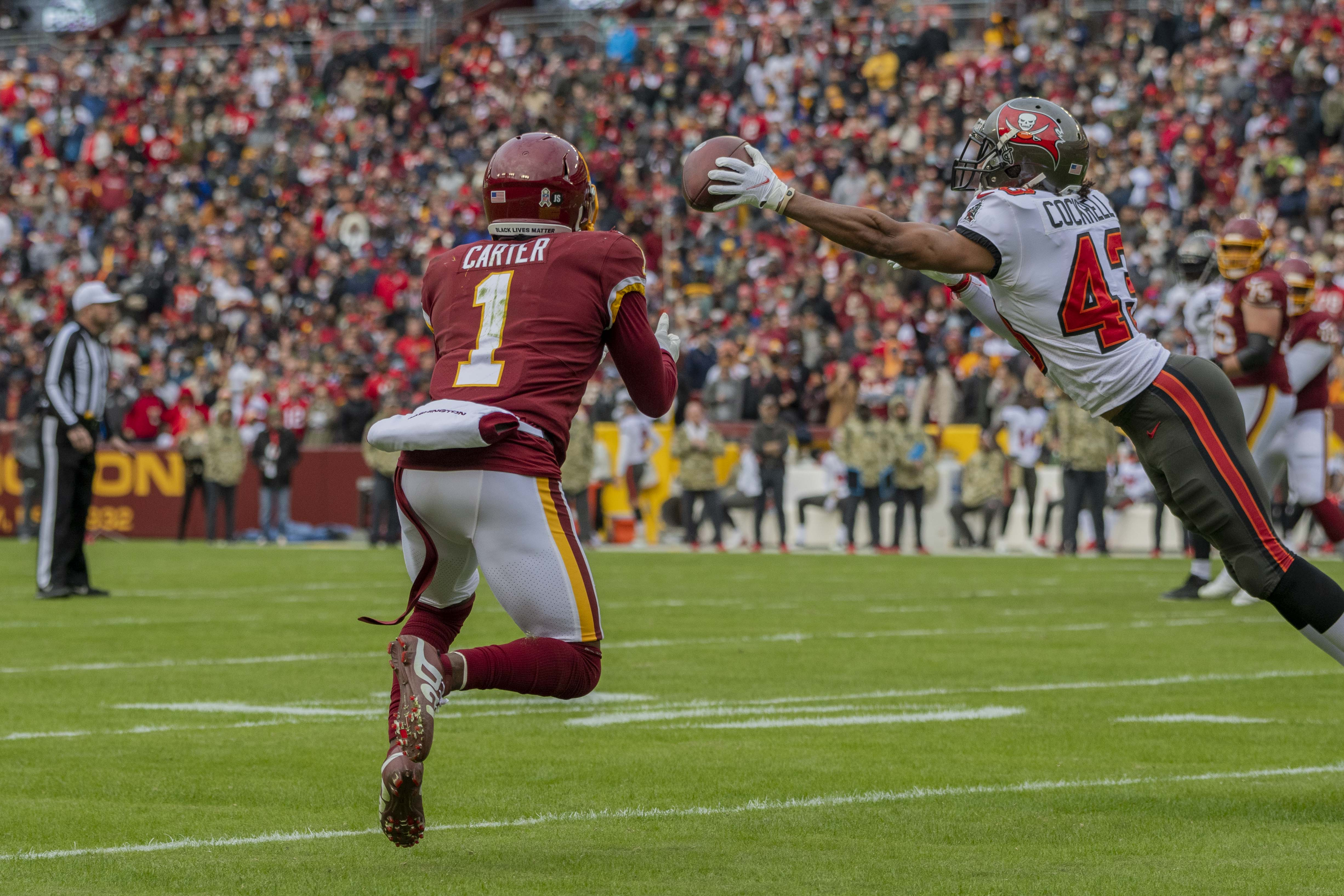
Cockrell (right) playing against the Washington Football Team in 2021

On September 23, 2020, Cockrell was signed to the practice squad of the Tampa Bay Buccaneers. He was elevated to the active roster on October 8 for the team's Week 5 game against the Chicago Bears, and reverted to the practice squad after the game. He was promoted to the active roster on October 13. Cockrell played in all four games in the Buccaneers' playoff run that resulted in the team winning Super Bowl LV.

Cockrell re-signed with the Buccaneers on April 13, 2021. He was released by the Buccaneers on August 16, 2022.

== NFL career statistics ==
Legend
**Bold**	Career high

=== Regular season ===
Year	Team	Games		Tackles					Interceptions					Fumbles			
Year	Team	GP	GS	Cmb	Solo	Ast	Sck	TFL	Int	Yds	TD	Lng	PD	FF	FR	Yds	TD
2014	BUF	7	0	1	1	0	0.0	0	0	0	0	0	0	0	0	0	0
2015	PIT	15	7	44	34	10	0.0	0	2	62	0	**37**	11	**1**	**1**	0	0
2016	PIT	16	**16**	**62**	47	**15**	0.0	**3**	0	0	0	0	**14**	0	**1**	0	0
2017	NYG	16	9	50	37	13	0.0	2	**3**	1	0	1	11	0	0	0	0
2019	CAR	14	11	**62**	**48**	14	0.0	**3**	2	**70**	0	**37**	8	0	0	0	0
2020	TAM	12	2	11	9	2	0.0	1	0	0	0	0	1	0	0	0	0
2021	TAM	**17**	4	43	29	14	0.0	0	0	0	0	0	7	**1**	0	0	0
Career		97	49	273	205	68	0.0	9	7	133	0	37	52	2	2	0	0

=== Playoffs ===
Year	Team	Games		Tackles					Interceptions					Fumbles			
Year	Team	GP	GS	Cmb	Solo	Ast	Sck	TFL	Int	Yds	TD	Lng	PD	FF	FR	Yds	TD
2015	PIT	2	0	1	1	0	0.0	0	0	0	0	0	0	0	**1**	-3	0
2016	PIT	3	**3**	**17**	**15**	**2**	0.0	**1**	0	0	0	0	0	0	0	0	0
2020	TAM	**4**	0	1	1	0	0.0	0	0	0	0	0	**1**	0	0	0	0
2021	TAM	2	0	1	0	1	0.0	0	0	0	0	0	0	0	**1**	0	0
Career		11	3	20	17	3	0.0	1	0	0	0	0	1	0	2	-3	0
