= Jordan Gay =

American football player (born 1990)

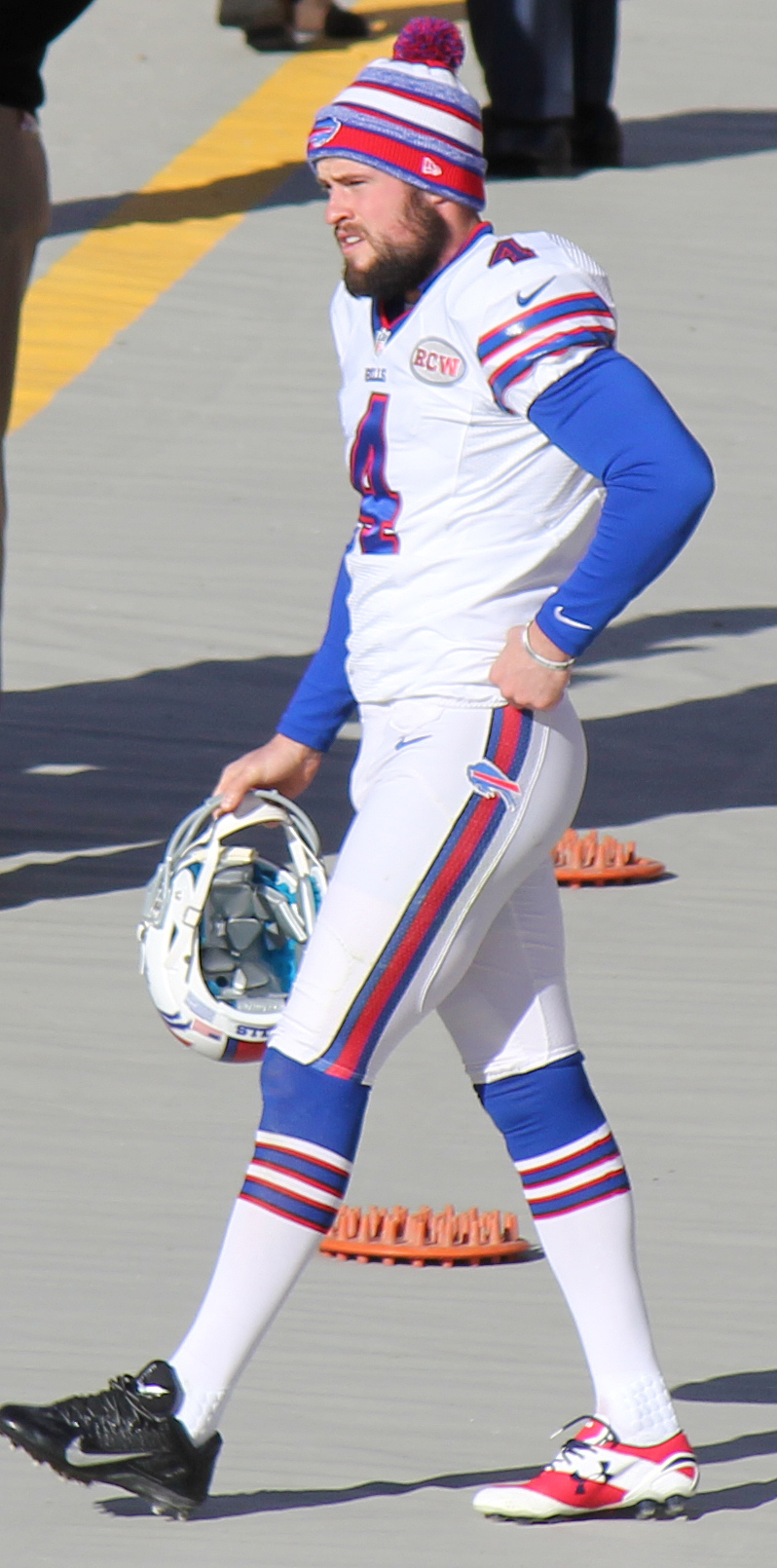
- Gay with the Buffalo Bills in 2014

No. 6, 8, 4, 3
- Position: Kickoff specialist

Personal information
- Born: March 29, 1990 (age 36); Danville, Kentucky, U.S.
- Listed height: 6 ft 0 in (1.83 m)
- Listed weight: 200 lb (91 kg)

Career information
- High school: Danville (Danville, Kentucky)
- College: Centre College
- NFL draft: 2013: undrafted

Career history
- Carolina Panthers (2013)*; New York Giants (2014)*; Carolina Panthers (2014)*; Buffalo Bills (2014–2016); Tennessee Titans (2017)*
- * Offseason or practice squad member only
- Stats at Pro Football Reference

Jordan Lane Gay (born March 29, 1990) is an American former professional football kickoff specialist. He signed with the Carolina Panthers after going undrafted in the 2013 NFL draft. He was also a member of the New York Giants, Buffalo Bills and Tennessee Titans.

== Professional career ==
Pre-draft measurables
| Height | Weight | Arm length | Hand span |
|---|---|---|---|
| 6 ft 0 3/8 in (1.84 m) | 197 lb (89 kg) | 31 1/2 in (0.80 m) | 8 1/2 in (0.22 m) |
All values from Pro Day

=== Carolina Panthers ===
Gay signed with the Carolina Panthers as an undrafted free agent. He was released on August 24, 2013.

=== New York Giants ===
Gay was signed by the New York Giants. Gay was released on May 12, 2014.

=== Second stint with the Carolina Panthers ===
Gay was signed by the Panthers for the second time on May 19, 2014. He was released on August 24, 2014.

=== Buffalo Bills ===
On August 26, 2014, Gay was claimed off waivers by the Buffalo Bills. Although nominally listed as a punter, Gay was primarily signed as a kickoff specialist; Colton Schmidt was signed to handle punting duties, though Gay was listed on the depth chart as the backup punter and holder behind Schmidt as well as backup kicker behind Dan Carpenter. Gay, along with Brandon McManus were the only primary kickoff specialists in the NFL in 2014.

On March 9, 2015, Gay signed a multi-year contract with the Bills.

Gay began the 2015 preseason as the Bills' starting kicker after Carpenter was placed on the non-football injury list.

Gay was released by the Bills on October 7, 2015, to clear a roster spot for Billy Cundiff. He was re-signed on October 23, 2015.

On August 31, 2016, Gay was released by the Bills. He was signed to the Bills practice squad on September 4. On September 9, he was elevated to the 53-man roster. He was released on September 27, 2016. He was re-signed by the Bills on November 26, 2016, to serve as the team's kickoff specialist. He was released on December 3, 2016.

=== Tennessee Titans ===
On May 15, 2017, Gay signed with the Tennessee Titans. He was released on August 14, 2017.
