= Kickoff specialist =

Position in gridiron football

A kickoff specialist is a special teams position in gridiron football. They are responsible for kicking the ball in the kickoff. These players tend to have a strong leg, often capable of making touchbacks, and capable of keeping a ball in the bounds of the field of play. For most teams, the placekicker is the kickoff specialist.

Pure kickoff specialists that handle only kickoff duties are now seldom used. Some kickoff specialists later become full-time kickers, while some are marginal placekickers who are soon out of football. Due to modern roster restrictions (and a 2016 rule change discouraging the kicking of touchbacks by awarding the receiving team possession at the 25-yard line instead of the 20), most NFL teams do not elect to have such kickoff specialists, and instead use their kickers (or, less often, punters) on kickoffs.

The most recent NFL pure kickoff specialist was Jordan Gay, who played the position for the Buffalo Bills under special teams coach Danny Crossman from 2014 to 2016. Prior to Gay being claimed off waivers, Buffalo's kickoff duties were handled by Billy Cundiff and John Potter, who likewise were kickoff specialists during their time in Buffalo; for 2017, the team brought in former high school kicking phenom Austin Rehkow as a contender for the position but opted not to use a kickoff specialist that year. Other players who have spent at least some time as kickoff specialists for an NFL team since 2006 include Stephen Hauschka, Rhys Lloyd, David Buehler, Todd Carter, and Brandon McManus. As of the end of the 2014 NFL season, punters Thomas Morstead, Matt Bosher, Sam Martin, Pat McAfee, and Michael Koenen handled kickoffs. There is at least one example of a backup quarterback serving as a kickoff specialist; in 1965, Bob Timberlake did so for the New York Giants. For a game in 2026, a week after his team surrendered a return touchdown, New York Jets fullback Andrew Beck was tasked with kickoffs to add an extra player who was capable of tackling.

In high school football and most other professional leagues, such as the Arena Football League and, until recent roster expansions, the Canadian Football League, one kicker handles all three kicking positions. Even college football teams usually do not implement dedicated kickoff specialists despite the much larger rosters at that level; however, if an underclassman has a stronger leg than the upperclassman kicker, but is not yet ready to assume kicker or punter duties, they will usually handle kickoff duties while being the primary backup kicker and punter.
