= Dan Carpenter =

American football player (born 1985)

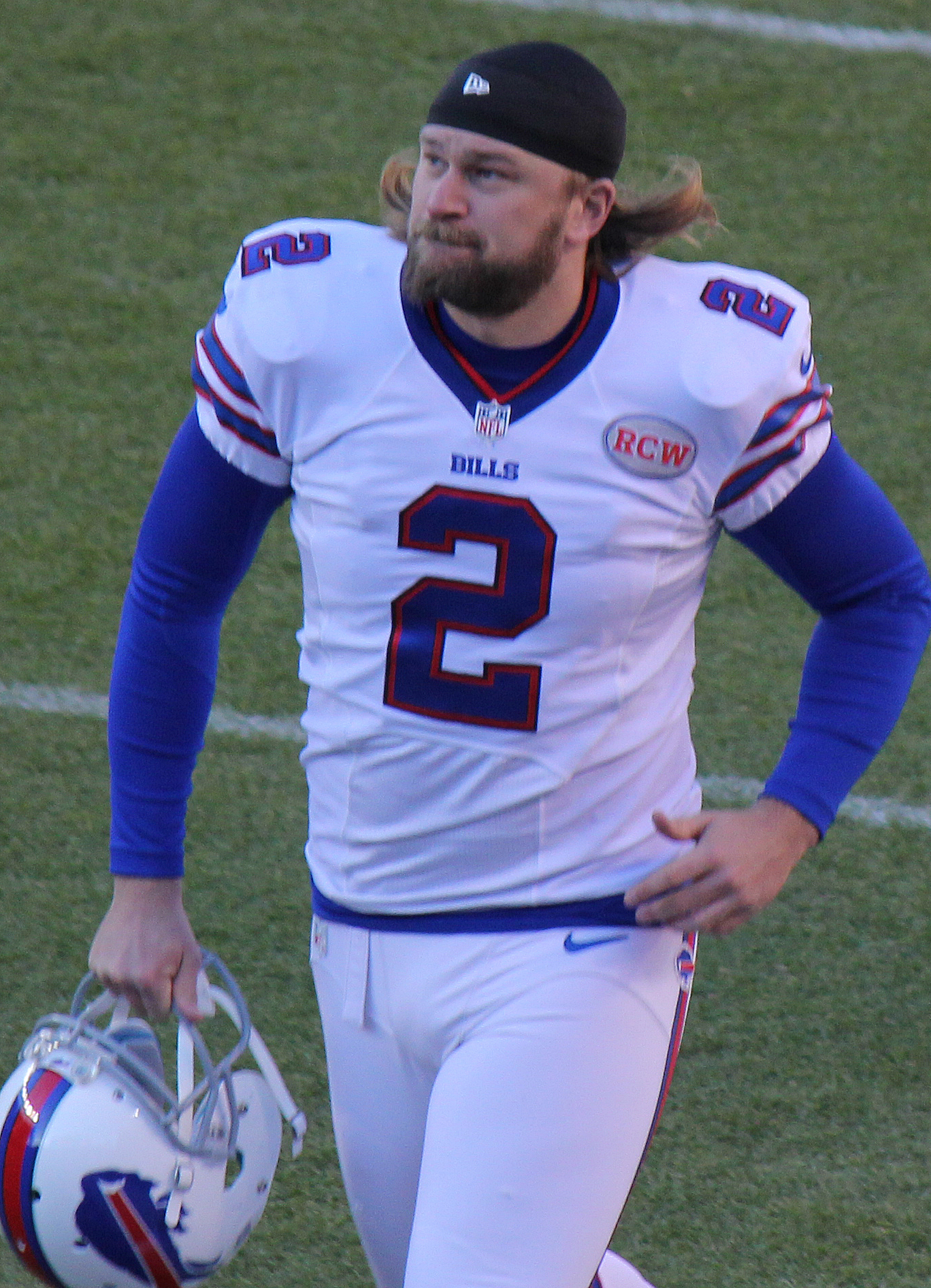
- Carpenter with the Buffalo Bills in 2014

No. 5, 2
- Position: Placekicker

Personal information
- Born: November 25, 1985 (age 40); Omaha, Nebraska, U.S.
- Listed height: 6 ft 2 in (1.88 m)
- Listed weight: 228 lb (103 kg)

Career information
- High school: Helena (MT)
- College: Montana
- NFL draft: 2008: undrafted

Career history
- Miami Dolphins (2008–2012); Arizona Cardinals (2013)*; New York Jets (2013)*; Buffalo Bills (2013–2016)
- * Offseason or practice squad member only

Awards and highlights
- Pro Bowl (2009); PFWA All-Rookie Team (2008); PFW All-Rookie Team (2008); First-team All-Big Sky (2007)

Career NFL statistics
- Field goals made: 236
- Field goal attempts: 281
- Field goal %: 84.0
- Longest field goal: 60
- Stats at Pro Football Reference

Daniel Roy Carpenter (born November 25, 1985) is an American former professional football player who was a placekicker in the National Football League (NFL). He was signed by the Miami Dolphins as an undrafted free agent in 2008 after playing college football for the University of Montana.

Carpenter spent his first five seasons playing for the Dolphins, with whom he was selected to the Pro Bowl in 2009. After being released by the Dolphins after the 2012 season, he spent parts of the 2013 preseason with the Arizona Cardinals and the New York Jets, before joining the Buffalo Bills before the start of the regular season. Carpenter spent four more seasons playing with the Bills before being released during the 2017 offseason.

== Early life ==
Carpenter attended Helena High School in Helena, Montana, where he was a member of the National Honor Society and had a 3.7 grade point average. As a football player at Helena, Carpenter was a two-time all-state and two-time all-league selection as a kicker and punter. During his senior season, he converted 26 of 29 point after attempts and made five field goals with a long of 53 yards. Additionally, he was a first all-conference and second-team all-state selection as a wide receiver, setting school records with 931 receiving yards and 13 touchdowns.

== College career ==
Carpenter enrolled at the University of Montana, and became the placekicker for the Montana Grizzlies football team as a true freshman in 2004. He went 18-for-29 (62.1 percent) on field-goal attempts while converting all 63 extra-point tries. Carpenter also rushed twice for 17 yards and scored a touchdown. His 123 points that season were the second-highest total in school history, and his performance earned him a second-team All-Big Sky selection.

As a sophomore in 2005, Carpenter went 14-for-21 (66.7 percent) on field-goal attempts and punted nine times for a 41.4-yard average. on the way to his second straight second-team All-Big Sky selection. His streak of 67 consecutive extra points made dating back to his freshman season was snapped in the 2005 season opener against Fort Lewis.

Carpenter earned his third straight All-Big Sky selection as a junior in 2006, receiving second-team honors as a placekicker as well as being an honorable mention as a punter. Additionally, he was named a first-team All-American by the Associated Press. On the season, he converted 24 of 30 field goals (80 percent) with four blocked and punted 62 times for a 41.9-yard average.

Carpenter had the most efficient season of his career as a senior in 2007, converting 19 of 23 field goals (82.6 percent). His performance earned him his fourth-straight All-Big Sky selection and second straight All-America selection.

In his four years at Montana, Carpenter converted on 75 of 103 field goals (72.8 percent) and punted 71 times for a 41.8-yard average. He also passed once for 14 yards, rushed twice for 17 yards and a touchdown, caught one pass for two yards and made seven solo tackles.

"It's a difficult thing to do, to punt and kick at the same time. Dan came in when Tyson (Johnson) was hurt, and it's remarkable that our punt coverage team was in the top five in the nation with our kicker also doing the punting."

— Bobby Hauck, Grizzlies head coach

== Professional career ==
Pre-draft measurables
Height	Weight
6 ft 1 3/4 in (1.87 m)	210 lb (95 kg)
Values from Pro Day

=== Miami Dolphins ===
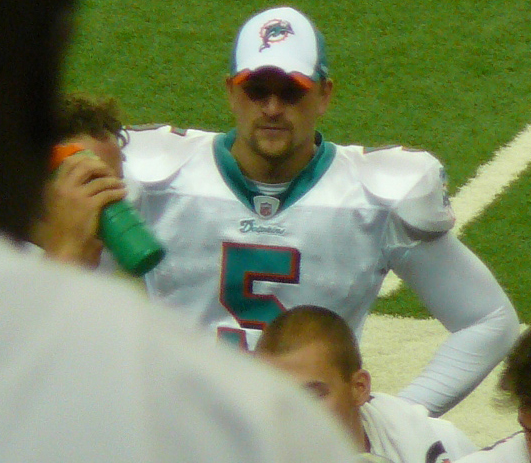
Carpenter with the Dolphins in 2009

After going undrafted in the 2008 NFL draft, Carpenter signed a two-year contract with the Miami Dolphins on April 29, 2008. The deal included a $7,500 signing bonus.

The Dolphins released 2007 starting kicker Jay Feely on August 12, 2008 (despite having set the Dolphins single-season field-goal percentage record in his only season), having already released try-out signing Dave Rayner on June 6. The decision effectively selected Carpenter to be the starting kicker for the 2008 season, with coach Tony Sparano commenting that the decision to cut Feely "was based purely on numbers, on performance, and Carpenter has outperformed him right now. That's the bottom line."

Carpenter made his professional debut on September 7, 2008 (Week 1) against the Jets, going 2/2 on PAT's (the team attempted no FG's). He kicked his first professional field goal the following week against the Cardinals, finishing the game with 1/1 FG's and 1/1 PAT's.

On November 30, 2008, Carpenter set the Dolphins' rookie record for most consecutive field goals made with 11.

Carpenter was awarded the AFC Special Teams Player of the Month for November 2008, for converting all eight of his field goal attempts during the month, including five from a distance longer than 40 yards.

According to NFL statistics, Carpenter finished the 2009 season going 25 for 28 on field goals with a long of 52 yards and also finished 40 for 40 on extra point attempts.

On October 17, 2010, against the Green Bay Packers, Carpenter kicked 3 field goals, including the 44-yard game-winning field goal with 9:01 left in overtime to give the Dolphins a 23–20 win.

On December 5, 2010, Carpenter made a 60-yard field goal in a home game against the Cleveland Browns and was the 5th longest in NFL history.

Two weeks later, on December 19, Carpenter had one of the worst statistical kicking performances in recent memory, going 0–4 on field goals against the Buffalo Bills in a loss that would end the Dolphins playoff hopes that season. All of the kicks he attempted were 48 yards or longer (49, 61, 53, 48.) A performance this bad would not be seen again until Week 5 of the 2018 NFL season when Mason Crosby went 1–6 on field goals against the Detroit Lions.

Carpenter made his first Pro Bowl in 2009. San Diego Chargers kicker Nate Kaeding did not play due to injury, and Carpenter took his spot.

At the end of the 2010 season, Carpenter was the second most accurate kicker in NFL history, behind Kaeding.

On September 23, 2012, Carpenter missed a 47-yard field goal in a home game against the New York Jets in overtime which would have sealed victory for Miami in overtime. Carpenter also missed a field goal from a similar distance earlier in the game. Miami would ultimately go on to lose 23–20 to New York in overtime.

On November 25, 2012, his 27th birthday, he hit a 43-yard field goal to win against the Seattle Seahawks in overtime to win 24–21 at home.

On December 22, 2012, Carpenter was placed on injured reserve.

On August 14, 2013, Carpenter was released by the Miami Dolphins. Before his release, he was battling rookie Caleb Sturgis for the Dolphins' starting placekicker job.

=== Arizona Cardinals ===
On August 21, 2013, Carpenter signed with the Arizona Cardinals. Carpenter was signed to compete for the starting placekicker job with incumbent kicker Jay Feely. On August 25, 2013, he was cut by the Cardinals.

=== New York Jets ===
Carpenter was signed by the New York Jets on August 27, 2013. He was released on August 31, 2013.

=== Buffalo Bills ===
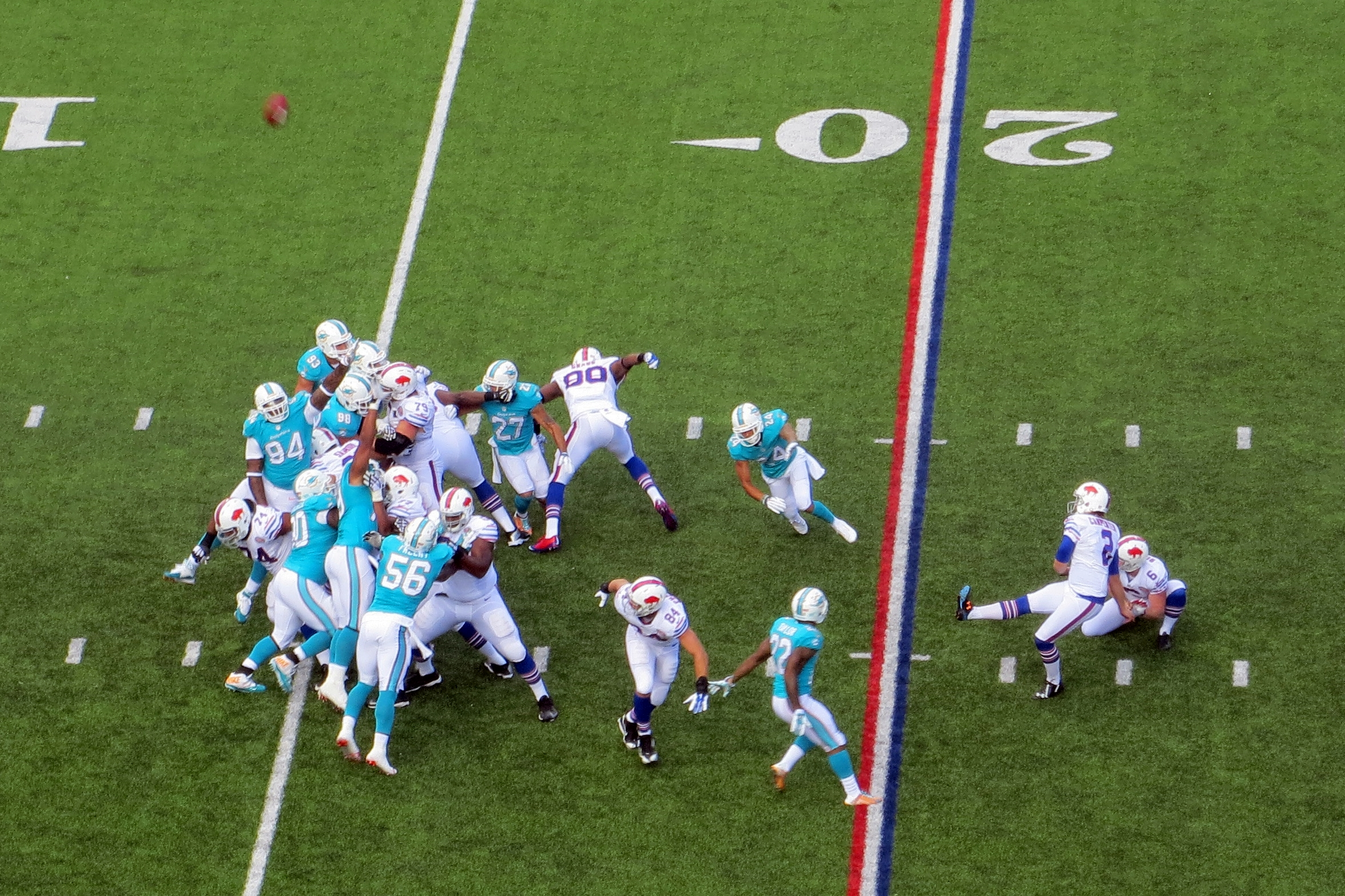
Carpenter (#2) kicking a field goal against his former team, Miami, in 2014

The Bills signed Carpenter on September 3, 2013, due to a groin injury sustained by starting kicker Dustin Hopkins.

On October 20, 2013, against the Miami Dolphins, Carpenter kicked three field goals, including the game-winner from 31 yards out with 33 seconds left in the game.

He re-signed with the Bills on March 11, 2014. Carpenter was named AFC Special Teams Player of the Week for the first week of the 2014 season due to his efforts against the Chicago Bears.

On September 14, 2014, against the Miami Dolphins, Carpenter converted five-of-six field goal attempts and two PATs, scoring a career-high 17 points.

In 2015, the Buffalo Bills brought in veteran placekicker, Billy Cundiff, to compete with Carpenter. After Week 5, Cundiff was released, making Carpenter their kicker for 2015.

In Week 11 of the 2016 season, Carpenter kicked three field goals including one for 54 yards in a win over the Bengals and was named AFC Special Teams Player of the Week.

On December 24, 2016, Week 16 – in overtime the Bills had a chance to go ahead on a 45-yard field goal, but Carpenter’s attempt went wide right. Three possessions later, the Dolphins got a 57-yard run down the left sideline from Jay Ajayi to set up a game-winning 27-yard field goal to lift the Dolphins over Buffalo 34–31, ending the Bills' slim playoff hopes.

On March 6, 2017, Carpenter was released by the Bills.

== Career statistics ==
=== NFL ===
Year	Team	GP	Field goals									Extra points			Total points
Year	Team	GP	FGM	FGA	FG%	<20	20−29	30−39	40−49	50+	Lng	XPM	XPA	XP%	Total points
2008	MIA	16	21	25	84.0	0–0	4–4	7–7	9–13	1–1	50	40	40	100.0	103
2009	MIA	16	25	28	89.3	0–0	9–9	7–8	8–9	1–2	52	37	38	97.4	112
2010	MIA	16	30	41	73.2	1–1	9–9	5–5	11–18	4–8	60	25	25	100.0	115
2011	MIA	14	29	34	85.3	0–0	10–11	6–7	11–12	2–4	58	26	26	100.0	113
2012	MIA	14	22	27	81.5	0–0	3–3	9–9	8–10	2–5	53	26	26	100.0	92
2013	BUF	16	33	36	91.7	0–0	13–13	6–6	10–11	4–6	55	32	32	100.0	131
2014	BUF	16	34	38	89.5	0–0	9–9	12–13	7–8	6–8	58	31	32	96.9	133
2015	BUF	16	23	27	85.2	0–0	5–5	8–9	7–8	3–5	52	34	40	85.0	103
2016	BUF	16	19	25	76.0	1–1	8–8	5–5	4–9	1–2	54	40	45	88.9	97
Total		140	236	281	84.0	2–2	70–71	65–69	75–98	24–41	60	291	304	95.7	999

=== College ===
Season	GP	Kicking					Punting			
Season	GP	FGA	FGM	Lng	FG%	PAT	Punts	Yds	Avg	Lng
2004	15	29	18	49	62.1	63	0	0	0.0	0
2005	12	21	14	50	66.7	34	9	373	41.4	55
2006	14	30	24	50	80.0	41	62	2,595	41.9	63
2007	12	23	19	54	82.6	44	0	0	0.0	0
Total	53	103	75	54	72.8	182	71	2,968	41.8	63

== Personal life ==
Born in Omaha, Nebraska, the 3rd child of Val and Diane Carpenter, moved to Helena, Montana when he was 20 months old. Carpenter played nearly all sports as a child and grew up as a Nebraska Cornhuskers fan. Carpenter married Kaela Clawson native of Plentywood, Montana, in a private ceremony and reception on July 2, 2011 in Montana. Carpenter and Clawson met in college in Missoula, Montana. Carpenter was cut by the Dolphins in 2013 with their first child "due any moment".

In 2016, Kaela controversially tweeted about her desire to have Seattle Seahawks cornerback Richard Sherman castrated following a game where Sherman landed a dirty hit on her husband.
