= Chris Hogan (American football) =

American football and lacrosse player (born 1988)

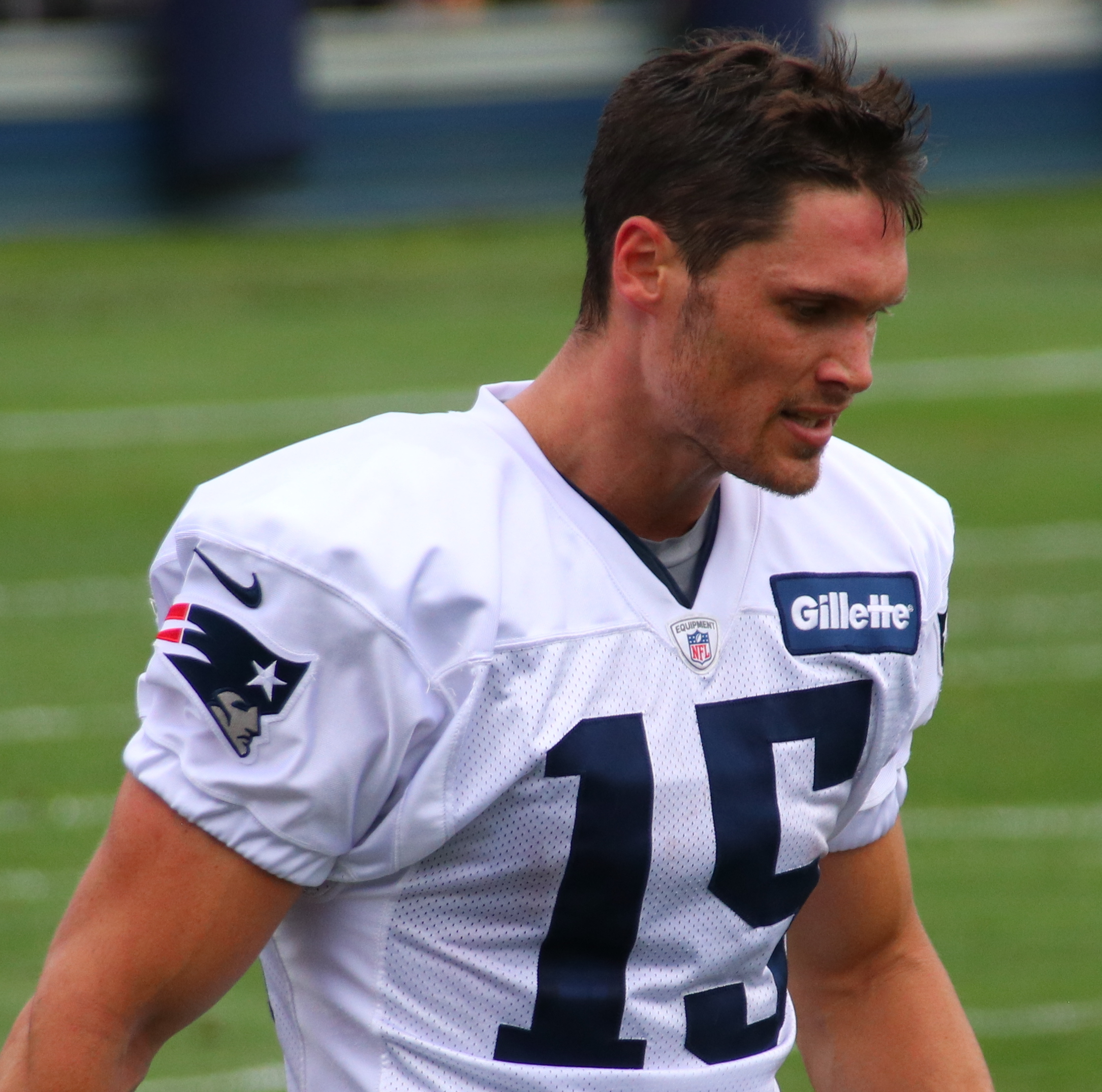
- Hogan with the New England Patriots in 2017

No. 15, 80
- Position: Wide receiver

Personal information
- Born: October 24, 1987 (age 39); Wyckoff, New Jersey, U.S.
- Listed height: 6 ft 1 in (1.85 m)
- Listed weight: 210 lb (95 kg)

Career information
- High school: Ramapo (Franklin Lakes, New Jersey)
- College: Monmouth (2010)
- NFL draft: 2011: undrafted

Career history
- San Francisco 49ers (2011)*; New York Giants (2011)*; Miami Dolphins (2011–2012)*; Buffalo Bills (2012–2015); New England Patriots (2016–2018); Carolina Panthers (2019); New York Jets (2020); New Orleans Saints (2021)
- * Offseason or practice squad member only

Awards and highlights
- 2× Super Bowl champion (LI, LIII)

Career NFL statistics
- Receptions: 220
- Receiving yards: 2,836
- Receiving touchdowns: 19
- Stats at Pro Football Reference

Christopher James Hogan (born October 24, 1987) is an American former professional football wide receiver who played in the National Football League (NFL) for 10 seasons. He played college football for the Monmouth Hawks following three years of college lacrosse with the Penn State Nittany Lions. Hogan was a member of five NFL teams, most notably the New England Patriots.

Joining the NFL as an undrafted free agent, Hogan made his first roster spot in 2012 with the Buffalo Bills, where he spent four years. After signing a three-year contract with the Patriots in 2016, Hogan made consecutive Super Bowl appearances each season and won two. Hogan spent his final three seasons with the Carolina Panthers, New York Jets, and New Orleans Saints. He was also a lacrosse midfielder for the Cannons and Whipsnakes Lacrosse Club of the Premier Lacrosse League (PLL) in 2021.

== Early life ==
Born and raised in Wyckoff, New Jersey, Hogan played both football and lacrosse for the Raiders athletic teams at Ramapo High School. He was a first-team all-state performer as a junior and senior in lacrosse and an all-state first-teamer as a senior in football.

== College career ==
=== Penn State ===
Hogan chose to attend Pennsylvania State University on scholarship with the Nittany Lions men's lacrosse program. He started all 13 games as a freshman in 2007, scoring 11 goals, but appeared in just three games as a sophomore because of a high ankle sprain. In 2009, Hogan had 29 goals on 133 shots and was named first-team All-ECAC as well as voted captain for his senior season. He graduated in 2010 with one year of college sports eligibility remaining.

In recognition of his collegiate background, Hogan would reference Penn State's lacrosse program during his intro in NFL games broadcast by NBC. Hogan stated that this was because he wanted to acknowledge the school he started at and graduated from, although he would have referenced both Penn State and his college football team at Monmouth University if given the opportunity.

=== Monmouth University ===
Taking advantage of the year of college eligibility remaining after his 2008 ankle injury, Hogan chose to enroll at Monmouth University to play football for the Hawks. He immediately secured a spot as a quarterback/receiver, in addition to playing at cornerback due to injuries in the secondary and all special teams units. He finished his one-year college football career with three touchdown passes, 12 receptions for 147 yards and three touchdowns on offense, and 28 tackles and three interceptions on defense.

== Professional career ==
=== Pre-draft ===
Pre-draft measurables
Height	Weight	Arm length	Hand span	40-yard dash	10-yard split	20-yard split	20-yard shuttle	Three-cone drill	Vertical jump	Broad jump	Bench press
6 ft 1 1/8 in (1.86 m)	221 lb (100 kg)	32 in (0.81 m)	8 1/2 in (0.22 m)	4.50 s	1.57 s	2.63 s	4.15 s	6.75 s	36.5 in (0.93 m)	10 ft 6 in (3.20 m)	28 reps
All values from Pro Day

Outside of his speed, Hogan is also noted for his strength as a wide receiver. At his 2011 Pro Day, Hogan pumped 28 reps of 225 pounds on the bench press. This would have been a record for wide receivers at the NFL Scouting Combine.

=== San Francisco 49ers ===
On July 27, 2011, the San Francisco 49ers signed Hogan as an undrafted free agent. On September 3, 2011, he was released by the 49ers.

=== New York Giants ===
On September 12, 2011, Hogan was signed by the New York Giants and was placed on the practice squad. On September 23, 2011, he was released by the Giants.

=== Miami Dolphins ===
On December 27, 2011, Hogan was signed to the Miami Dolphins' practice squad. On January 3, 2012, he signed a reserve/future contract with the Dolphins. In 2012, he was among the final cuts at the end of training camp, but he was re-signed to the Dolphins' practice squad. On September 11, 2012, his practice squad contract was terminated by the Dolphins.

=== Buffalo Bills ===
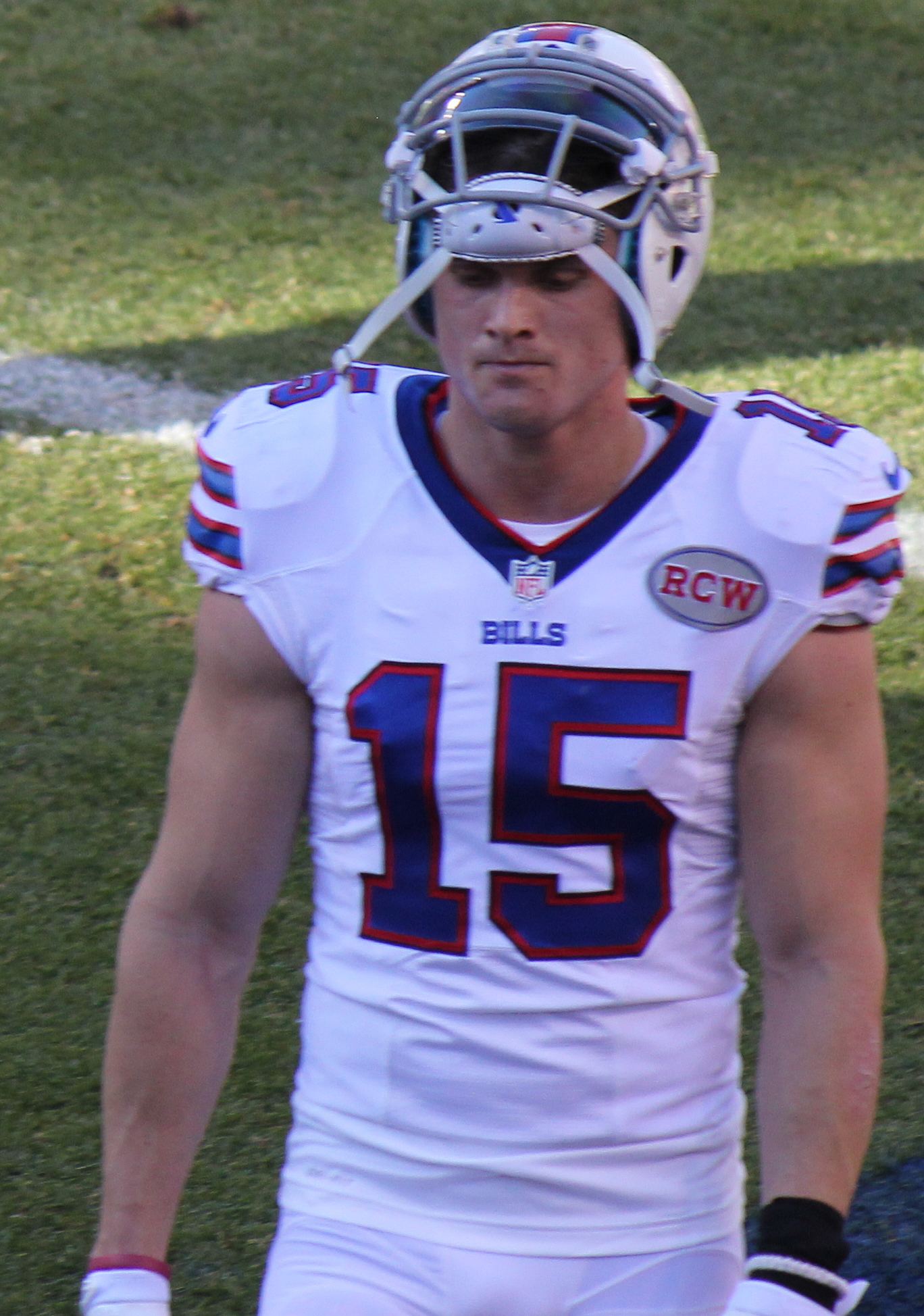
Hogan with the Bills in 2014

On November 6, 2012, the Buffalo Bills signed Hogan to their practice squad. On December 18, 2012, Hogan was promoted to the active roster. On October 3, 2013, he recorded his first career reception against the Cincinnati Bengals. On October 12, 2014, against the New England Patriots, Hogan caught his first NFL touchdown on an eight-yard pass from quarterback Kyle Orton. Hogan had a breakout season for the Bills in 2014, recording 41 receptions for 426 yards and four touchdowns.

In the 2015 season, Hogan played in all 16 games for the Bills for the third consecutive season. He caught his first touchdown of the season in a win against his former team, the Miami Dolphins, and had his best game on a Monday Night Football game against the New England Patriots, catching six passes for 95 yards. In Week 5, against the Tennessee Titans, Hogan threw his first career NFL pass, a four-yard pass to quarterback Tyrod Taylor. The pass came on a drive that fueled the Bills to a 14–13 win. Hogan also had his first career rushing attempt during the season, which went for four yards. Hogan ended the 2015 season with 36 receptions for a career-high 450 yards and two touchdowns.

=== New England Patriots ===
==== 2016 season ====
On March 10, 2016, Hogan, a restricted free agent, signed a three-year offer sheet with the New England Patriots for $12 million, with $7.5 million guaranteed. The contract was front-loaded ($5.5 million in 2016) to make it difficult for the Bills to match. This occurred as head coach Bill Belichick saw major potential describing Hogan as a "burner" with incredible athleticism. On March 11, the Bills declined to match the offer sheet, receiving no draft compensation because of their original minimum salary one-year tender.

During a Week 1 matchup against the Arizona Cardinals on NBC Sunday Night Football, Hogan scored the first touchdown of the season for the Patriots on a 37-yard pass from quarterback Jimmy Garoppolo. In the Patriots' Week 5 matchup against the Cleveland Browns, Hogan had a career-high of 114 receiving yards, this time with Tom Brady as his quarterback. In Week 8, while playing against his former team in Buffalo, he caught four passes for 91 yards, including a then-career-long 53-yard touchdown reception. In Week 12, against the New York Jets, Hogan became the third Patriots wide receiver in as many seasons to attempt a pass; while Hogan's left-handed pass was incomplete, it drew a 31-yard defensive pass interference penalty. He also passed his previous career-best for receiving yards in a season with 461 yards on 21 receptions (20.1 yards per catch, then trailing only injured teammate Rob Gronkowski for the NFL lead at 21.6). In Week 14, on Monday Night Football, he caught a 79-yard touchdown pass against the Baltimore Ravens, the longest of his career (and the seventh longest in the NFL through Week 14), part of another career-best 129 yards on five receptions. He ended the season with 38 receptions for 680 yards and 4 touchdowns; his 17.89 yards per catch was second only to DeSean Jackson's 17.95. In the postseason, Hogan had four receptions for 95 yards in a Divisional Round win over Houston, followed by nine receptions for 180 yards and two touchdowns in the AFC Championship win over Pittsburgh. These were career highs in all three categories, and a Patriots playoff record for receiving yards in a single game. On February 5, 2017, Hogan was part of the Patriots team that won Super Bowl LI. In the game, he had four receptions for 57 yards as the Patriots defeated the Atlanta Falcons 34–28 in overtime.

==== 2017 season ====
In Week 2, against the New Orleans Saints, Hogan had five receptions for 78 yards and his first touchdown of the 2017 season. In addition, he recovered an onside kick in the fourth quarter. By Week 5, Hogan already had a career-best five touchdowns on the season. On October 29, against the Los Angeles Chargers, Hogan injured his right shoulder and had to miss a few games. On December 11, he made his return and recorded one reception for five yards in a 27–20 loss to the Miami Dolphins on Monday Night Football. Hogan helped the Patriots reach the Super Bowl for the second straight season after defeating both the Tennessee Titans in the Divisional Round and Jacksonville Jaguars in the AFC Championship. In Super Bowl LII, Hogan recorded six catches for 128 yards and scored a touchdown along with getting one carry for four yards. The Patriots lost to the Philadelphia Eagles by a score of 41–33.

==== 2018 season ====
Hogan appeared in all 16 games for the Patriots, but was used less than in previous seasons. Despite a promising Week 2 against the Jacksonville Jaguars, where he recorded his second career regular-season game with two receiving touchdowns in the 31–20 loss, he had over five targets in just two games, zero receptions in four games, and failed to break 80 yards in any game. His only other touchdown reception came in Week 15. His 532 receiving yards in the regular season was fifth on the team; he had been fourth in 2017 despite playing just nine games.

The Patriots reached their third straight Super Bowl after defeating both the Los Angeles Chargers in the Divisional Round and Kansas City Chiefs in the AFC Championship. Against the Chiefs in the AFC title game, Hogan had five catches for 45 yards, including a one-handed reception on third-and-8 in the fourth-quarter to sustain the Patriots' scoring drive to regain the lead at 31–28. In Super Bowl LIII, Hogan had no catches on six targets, but the Patriots won by a score of 13–3 against the Los Angeles Rams.

=== Carolina Panthers ===
On April 12, 2019, Hogan signed with the Carolina Panthers. After four games where he recorded just three receptions, he was placed on injured reserve on October 2, 2019, with a left knee injury which required arthroscopic surgery. He was designated for return from injured reserve on December 11, 2019, and began practicing with the team again. He was activated on December 15, 2019.

Hogan had a tryout with the Detroit Lions on August 14, 2020.

=== New York Jets ===
Hogan signed with the New York Jets on August 19, 2020. Hogan played in five games with 14 receptions for 118 yards. He was placed on injured reserve on October 13, 2020, with a high ankle sprain. He was waived from injured reserve on December 5, 2020.

=== New Orleans Saints ===
On July 26, 2021, Hogan signed a one-year contract with the New Orleans Saints. He scored his first touchdown as a Saint on a ten-yard reception from Jameis Winston in Week 1 against the Green Bay Packers. He officially retired from the NFL on October 23, 2021. He played five games with the Saints in his final season.

== Lacrosse career ==
In February 2021, Hogan declared for the Premier Lacrosse League entry draft. He went undrafted before being acquired by the Cannons Lacrosse Club. On July 6, 2021, Hogan was traded along with faceoff specialist Drew Simoneau to the Whipsnakes in exchange for faceoff specialist Kevin Reisman.

== NFL career statistics ==
Legend
	Won the Super Bowl
**Bold**	Career high

Regular season statistics
Year	Team	Games		Receiving					Rushing					Fumbles	
Year	Team	GP	GS	Rec	Yds	Avg	Lng	TD	Att	Yds	Avg	Lng	TD	Fum	Lost
2013	BUF	**16**	0	10	83	8.3	16	0	—	—	—	—	—	0	0
2014	BUF	**16**	2	**41**	426	10.4	31	4	—	—	—	—	—	**2**	**2**
2015	BUF	**16**	4	36	450	12.5	46	2	1	4	4.0	4	0	0	0
2016	NE	15	**14**	38	**680**	**17.9**	**79T**	4	3	9	3.0	6	0	1	1
2017	NE	9	7	34	439	12.9	47T	**5**	**3**	**17**	**5.7**	**13**	0	0	0
2018	NE	**16**	7	35	532	15.2	63T	3	—	—	—	—	—	0	0
2019	CAR	7	1	8	67	8.4	13	0	—	—	—	—	—	0	0
2020	NYJ	5	1	14	118	8.4	27	0	—	—	—	—	—	0	0
2021	NO	5	5	4	41	10.3	16	1	—	—	—	—	—	0	0
Total		105	40	220	2,836	12.8	79	19	7	30	4.3	13	0	3	3

Postseason statistics
Year	Team	Games		Receiving					Rushing					Fumbles	
Year	Team	GP	GS	Rec	Yds	Avg	Lng	TD	Att	Yds	Avg	Lng	TD	Fum	Lost
2016	NE	3	3	17	332	19.5	45	2	—	—	—	—	—	0	0
2017	NE	3	2	9	152	16.9	43	2	1	4	4.0	4	0	0	0
2018	NE	3	2	8	58	7.2	11	0	—	—	—	—	—	0	0
Total		9	7	34	542	15.9	45	4	1	4	4.0	4	0	0	0

=== Patriots franchise records ===
- Most yards receiving in a playoff game (180, January 22, 2017)

== Sponsorships and endorsements ==
In 2015, Maximum Human Performance (MHP) announced the signing of Hogan to a sponsorship deal.

== Personal life ==
Hogan is married to Dr. Ashley Boccio, a podiatrist and Long Island native whom he met at Penn State when they were both lacrosse players. The couple have four children (Chase, Parker, Peyton, & Carter). Ashley was pregnant during the Patriots' Super Bowl LI run and could not attend the game, but she did attend Super Bowl LII. While with the Patriots, Hogan stayed in Foxborough, Massachusetts, during the NFL season but drove down to his family home in Huntington, New York, on Monday nights, spending Tuesday there before returning to Foxborough. Hogan is of Irish descent.

== See also ==
- Lacrosse in Pennsylvania
