= Randell Johnson =

American football player (born 1991)

No. 49, 58
- Position: Linebacker

Personal information
- Born: March 23, 1991 (age 35); Miami, Florida, U.S.
- Listed height: 6 ft 3 in (1.91 m)
- Listed weight: 242 lb (110 kg)

Career information
- High school: North Miami (North Miami, Florida)
- College: Florida Atlantic
- NFL draft: 2014: 7th round, 221st overall pick

Career history
- Buffalo Bills (2014–2016); Los Angeles Rams (2016)*; New York Jets (2016); Orlando Apollos (2018–2019)*
- * Offseason or practice squad member only

Career NFL statistics
- Total tackles: 7
- Fumble recoveries: 2
- Stats at Pro Football Reference

Randell Johnson (born March 23, 1991) is an American former professional football player who was a linebacker in the National Football League (NFL). He played college football for the Florida Atlantic Owls and was selected by the Buffalo Bills in the seventh round of the 2014 NFL draft.

== Early life ==
Johnson attended North Miami High School in Miami, Florida, where he recorded 99 tackles, including seven sacks and two interceptions as a senior, earning all-Dade-County honorable mention honors.

He was considered two-star recruit by Rivals.com.

== College career ==
Johnson attended Florida Atlantic University, where he was a member of the FAU Owls football team from 2009 to 2013. During his career, he saw action in 42 games, amassing 195 total tackles, including 30.5 for loss, 10.5 sacks, four pass deflections and four forced fumbles.

== Professional career ==
=== Buffalo Bills ===
Johnson was selected by the Buffalo Bills in the seventh round (221st overall) of the 2014 NFL draft. On September 2, 2016, he was released by the Bills as part of final roster cuts.

=== Los Angeles Rams ===
On November 22, 2016, Johnson was signed to the Los Angeles Rams' practice squad.

=== New York Jets ===
On December 19, 2016, Johnson was signed by the New York Jets off the Rams' practice squad. He was waived by the Jets on June 9, 2017.

=== Orlando Apollos ===
Johnson signed with the Orlando Apollos of the Alliance of American Football for the 2019 season. On January 14, 2019, Johnson retired from the Apollos.
