= Billy Cundiff =

American football player (born 1980)

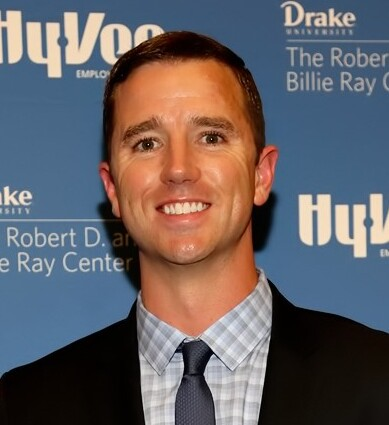
- Cundiff in 2015

No. 3, 4, 8, 7, 5
- Position: Placekicker

Personal information
- Born: March 30, 1980 (age 46); Phoenix, Arizona, U.S.
- Listed height: 6 ft 1 in (1.85 m)
- Listed weight: 212 lb (96 kg)

Career information
- High school: Harlan Community (Harlan, Iowa)
- College: Drake (1998–2001)
- NFL draft: 2002: undrafted

Career history
- Dallas Cowboys (2002–2005); Tampa Bay Buccaneers (2006)*; Green Bay Packers (2006)*; New Orleans Saints (2006); Atlanta Falcons (2007)*; Kansas City Chiefs (2008)*; Detroit Lions (2009)*; Cleveland Browns (2009); Baltimore Ravens (2009–2011); Washington Redskins (2012); San Francisco 49ers (2012); New York Jets (2013)*; Cleveland Browns (2013–2014); Buffalo Bills (2015)
- * Offseason or practice squad member only

Awards and highlights
- First-team All-Pro (2010); Pro Bowl (2010); Golden Toe Award (2010); First-team Division I-AA All-American (2001); 4× First-team All-PFL (1998–2001)

Career NFL statistics
- Field goals: 182
- Field goal attempts: 239
- Field goal %: 76.2
- Longest field goal: 56
- Stats at Pro Football Reference

William Ambrose Cundiff (born March 30, 1980) is an American former professional football player who was a placekicker in the National Football League (NFL). He played college football for Drake University, and was signed by the Dallas Cowboys as an undrafted free agent in 2002.

== College career ==
Cundiff played for the Drake Bulldogs football team of Drake University, where he broke five Pioneer Football League (PFL) career records including most points (284), field goals (49) and points after touchdown (137). He made eight field goals over 50 yards during his career with the Bulldogs, including a PFL-record 62-yarder as a junior in 2000 against San Diego. He also was part of the Drake University Men's Basketball team. He played sparingly, partly due to several members of the team being ruled academically ineligible. He earned a Bachelor of Arts degree in biology in 2003. He was presented the highest honor for a student-athlete at the university when he received the Drake Double D Award on February 12, 2012.

== Professional career ==
=== Dallas Cowboys ===
Cundiff was brought to the 2002 training camp as an undrafted free agent, and won out over incumbent Tim Seder as the team's kicker. As a rookie, he won the NFC Special Teams Player of the Week award, after making a 48-yard field goal on the game's final play for a 13–10 victory against the St. Louis Rams.

On September 15, 2003, Cundiff tied the then-NFL single game record of seven field goals against the New York Giants on Monday Night Football, with distances of 37, 49, 42, 21, 36, 52, and 25 yards. The 52-yarder forced OT and the 25 yarder won the game. That year, he became the second player (Chris Boniol was first) in team history to win the NFC Special Teams Player of the Week two times in a season.

In 2005, which would have been his fourth season with the team, he was waived/injured during training camp following a quadriceps injury, and briefly replaced by kickoff specialist José Cortéz, who had not been expected to make the team. Cundiff was later re-signed on November 19, 2005 (directly following the mandatory period after an injury waiver) having recovered from his training camp injury. He replaced kicker Shaun Suisham, in the hope of providing greater consistency to the Cowboys' special teams. In his first game back with the Cowboys, Cundiff made a 56-yard field goal at the end of the first half to set a record for longest field goal in franchise history. Cundiff played six games that season before being released by the Cowboys on December 26, 2005 after missing two field goals in a critical game against the Carolina Panthers. The Cowboys re-signed Suisham to replace him for the season finale.

=== Tampa Bay Buccaneers ===
On February 15, 2006, the Tampa Bay Buccaneers signed Cundiff to a contract, but he was released after kicker Matt Bryant was re-signed.

=== Green Bay Packers ===
Cundiff signed with the Green Bay Packers on March 28, 2006, and was expected to compete with Dave Rayner for the starting kicking position before being cut by Green Bay on August 17.

=== New Orleans Saints ===
On November 22, 2006, the New Orleans Saints signed Cundiff as a kickoff specialist, easing the workload of veteran John Carney.

=== Atlanta Falcons ===
After being released by the Saints, Cundiff signed with the Atlanta Falcons on May 4, 2007. He was released at the end of the preseason after losing the starting job to Matt Prater.

=== Kansas City Chiefs ===
In January 2008, Cundiff was signed by the Kansas City Chiefs to a two-year contract. He was released prior to the start of the regular season.

=== Detroit Lions ===
Cundiff was signed by the Detroit Lions on August 26, 2009, after an injury to placekicker Jason Hanson. He was cut by the team on September 5, 2009.

=== Cleveland Browns (first stint) ===
Cundiff was signed by the Cleveland Browns on September 26, 2009, after an injury to placekicker Phil Dawson. Cundiff beat out Matt Bryant in a workout with the Browns and was signed after the Browns first choice of Matt Stover declined to sign with the team. In week 5 of the 2009 NFL season, Cundiff hit the game-winning field goal to help the Browns beat the Buffalo Bills, 6–3. He was waived by the team on November 3, 2009.

=== Baltimore Ravens ===
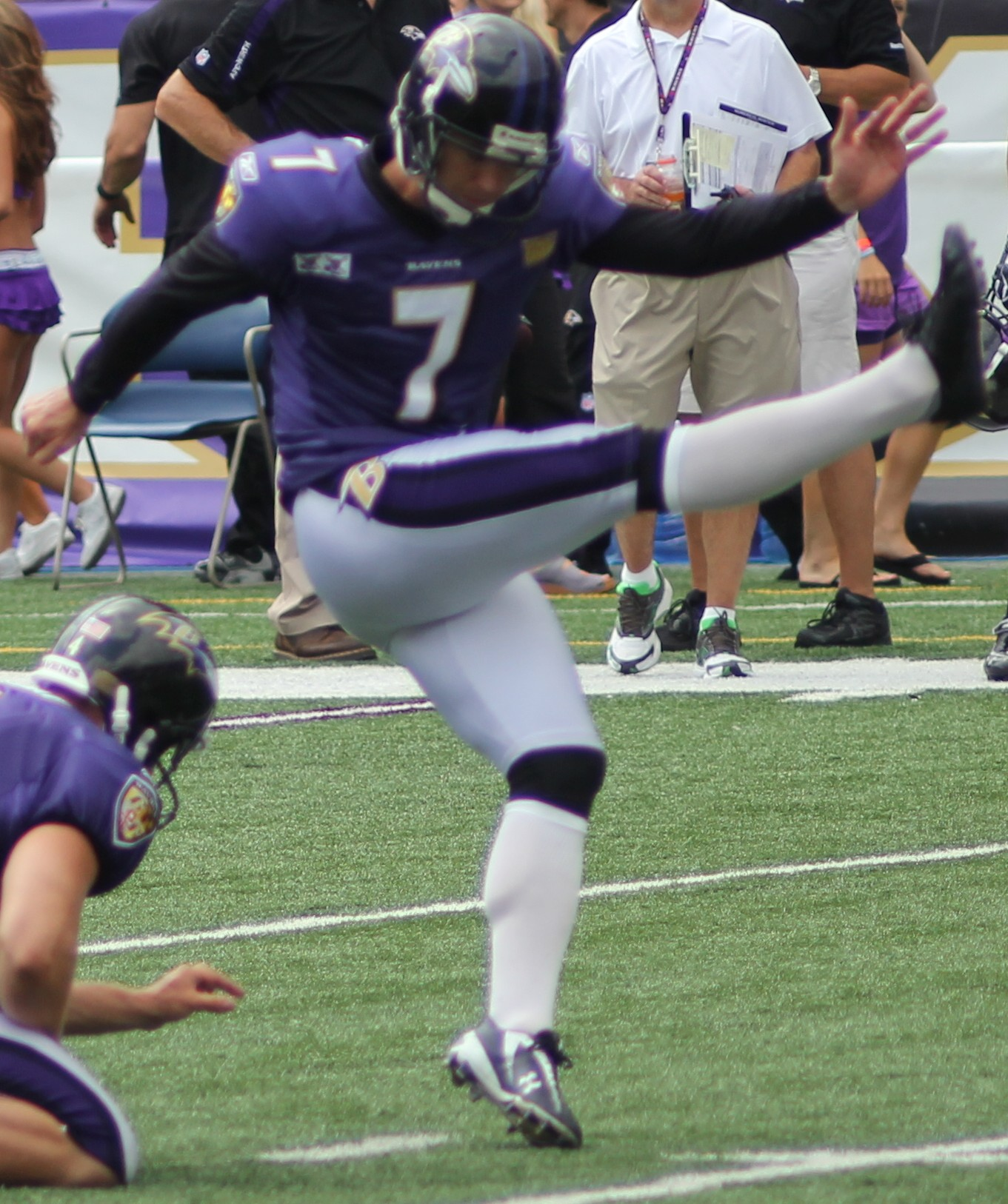
Cundiff with the Ravens in 2011

Cundiff was brought in by the Baltimore Ravens for a workout on November 10, 2009 and was signed on November 18, 2009 to replace Stephen Hauschka, who was waived on November 17.

Cundiff re-signed with the Ravens to return for the 2010 season. Cundiff was voted to the 2011 Pro Bowl as the AFC placekicker after successfully completing 26 of 29 field goal attempts and a league-high 40 touchbacks. On January 2, 2011, Cundiff recorded his league-leading 40th touchback, which tied the NFL record set by Mitch Berger. Cundiff played at home in the outdoor M&T Bank Stadium and set the record after the instatement of the K-ball rule. He averaged 71.1 yards per kickoff to lead the league and had touchbacks on 51.3% of his kickoffs.

Cundiff signed a five-year, $15 million contract to become Baltimore's long-term kicker on January 23, 2011.

On the most famous kick of Cundiff's career, in the closing seconds of the 2011 AFC Championship Game on January 22, 2012, against the New England Patriots, Cundiff missed a 32-yard field goal that would have tied the game. The Ravens lost 23–20.

Cundiff was released by the Ravens on August 26, 2012; he was replaced by rookie kicker Justin Tucker.

=== Washington Redskins ===
Cundiff was signed by the Washington Redskins on August 28, 2012. In Week 2 against the St. Louis Rams, he attempted a 62-yard field goal on the last play of the game to put the game into overtime, but missed. Two weeks later against the Tampa Bay Buccaneers, after being zero for three in his field goal attempts, which consisted of a 41-yard, 57-yard, and 31-yard attempts, Cundiff made a 41-yard field goal in the last play of the game allowing the Redskins to win 24–22.

On October 9, 2012, Kai Forbath was signed to replace Cundiff, who was subsequently released.

=== San Francisco 49ers ===
Cundiff signed with the San Francisco 49ers on January 1, 2013, to compete with struggling veteran David Akers.

However, Akers performed well enough to keep the starting job, and Cundiff was left off the postseason roster and released 17 days later on January 18, 2013.

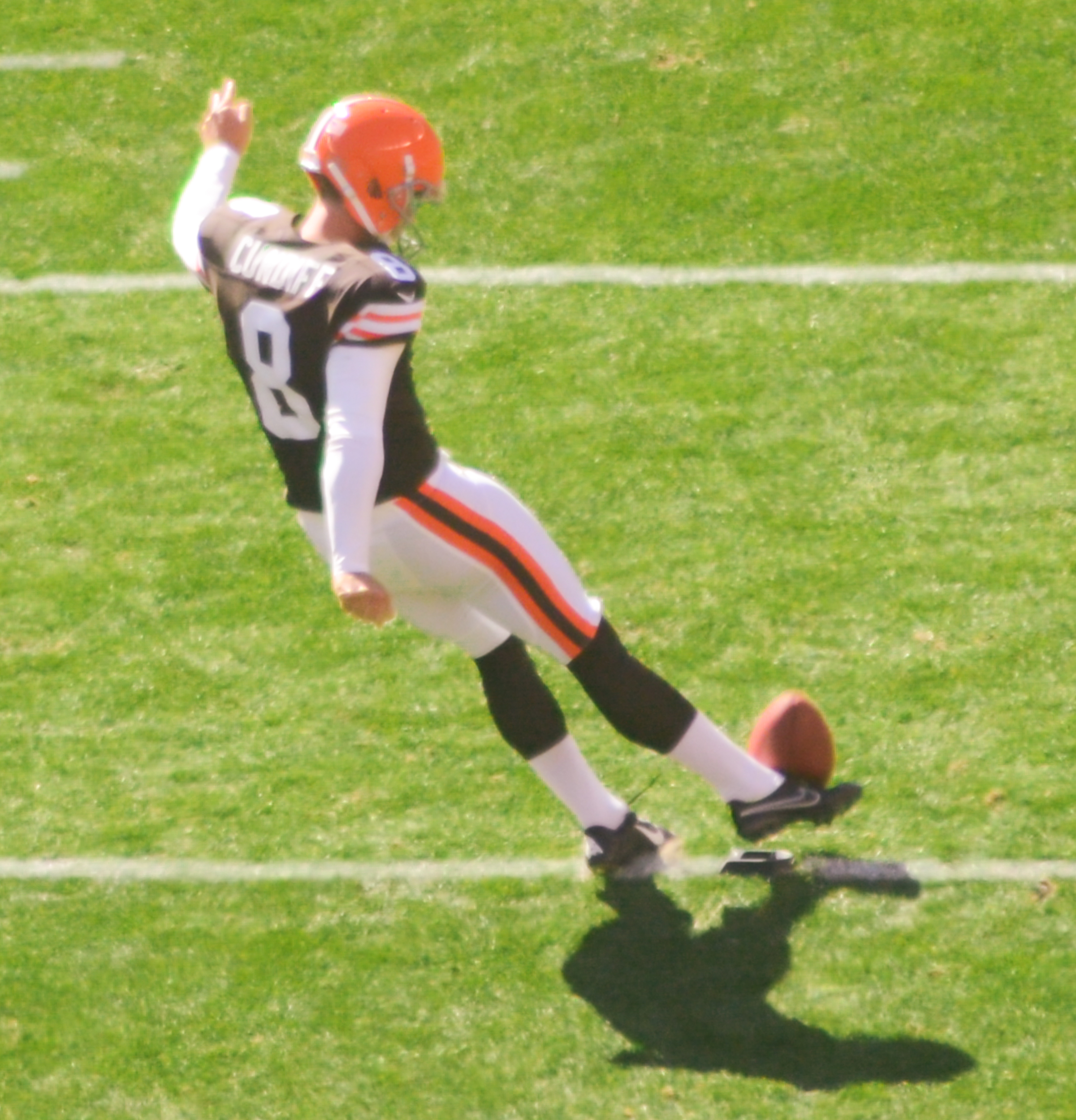
Cundiff with the Browns in 2014

=== New York Jets ===
Cundiff was signed by the New York Jets on July 23, 2013, to compete with incumbent Jets kicker Nick Folk. He was released by the Jets on August 27, 2013.

=== Cleveland Browns (second stint) ===
Cundiff returned to the Cleveland Browns on September 3, 2013, after the Browns made roster cuts and released all of their kickers, including Shayne Graham. On March 6, 2014, Cundiff was re-signed for the next year for just over $1 million after making 80 percent of his field goals and 100 percent of his extra points the previous year. On September 14, 2014, Cundiff kicked a game-winning field goal against the New Orleans Saints with three seconds remaining. He did the same on November 23 against the Atlanta Falcons. After sustaining a knee injury on December 11, 2014, Cundiff was subsequently released on December 13, 2014, with an injury settlement. In the five games prior to his release, Cundiff missed at least one field goal in each game.

=== Buffalo Bills ===
Cundiff was signed by the Buffalo Bills on October 7, 2015. He was ostensibly signed as a kickoff specialist to replace Jordan Gay. Cundiff was released by the Bills on October 13, 2015.

== NFL career statistics ==
=== Regular season ===
Year	Team	GP	Overall FGs				PATs			Kickoffs		Points
Year	Team	GP	Lng	FGA	FGM	Pct	XPA	XPM	Pct	KO	TB	Points
2002	DAL	16	48	19	12	63.2	25	25	100.0	30	1	61
2003	DAL	15	52	29	23	79.3	31	30	96.8	3	0	99
2004	DAL	16	49	26	20	76.9	31	31	100.0	67	3	91
2005	DAL	6	56	8	5	62.5	14	14	100.0	26	1	29
2006	NO	5	--	1	0	0.0	--	--	--	7	0	0
2009	CLE	5	31	6	6	100.0	4	4	100.0	16	2	22
2009	BAL	7	46	17	12	70.6	19	19	100.0	38	1	55
2010	BAL	16	49	29	26	89.7	39	39	100.0	79	40	117
2011	BAL	15	51	37	28	75.7	38	38	100.0	76	44	122
2012	WAS	5	45	12	7	58.3	17	17	100.0	29	18	38
2013	CLE	16	51	26	21	80.8	32	32	100.0	65	42	95
2014	CLE	15	52	29	22	75.9	28	28	100.0	63	39	94
2015	BUF	1	--	0	0	--	0	0	--	3	0	0
Career		136	56	239	182	76.2	278	277	99.6	502	191	823

=== Postseason ===
Year	Team	GP	Overall FGs				PATs			Kickoffs		Points
Year	Team	GP	Lng	FGA	FGM	Pct	XPA	XPM	Pct	KO	TB	Points
2003	DAL	1	37	1	1	100.0	1	1	100.0	0	0	4
2006	NO	2	--	1	0	0.0	0	0	--	9	2	0
2009	BAL	2	27	3	3	100.0	3	3	100.0	9	1	12
2010	BAL	2	29	4	4	100.0	6	6	100.0	12	2	18
2011	BAL	2	48	5	4	80.0	4	4	100.0	10	3	24
Career		9	48	14	12	85.7	14	14	100.0	31	6	50

== Personal life ==
Cundiff is married to his college sweetheart, Nicole. The couple have three children.

In July 2007, Cundiff enrolled in a full-time Master of Business Administration (MBA) program at Arizona State University's W. P. Carey School of Business. He graduated with his MBA and MRED from ASU in May 2009.
