= Davontae =

Davontae is a given name of African-American origin. Notable people with the name include:

- Davontae Harris (born 1995), American football player
- Davontae Merriweather (born 1993), American football player
- Davontae Williams (1995–2004), American child murdered through malnutrition by his parents

== See also ==
- Devontae
- Davonte
- Devonte
- Devonta
- Devante
