= Robert Woods (wide receiver, born 1992) =

American football player (born 1992)

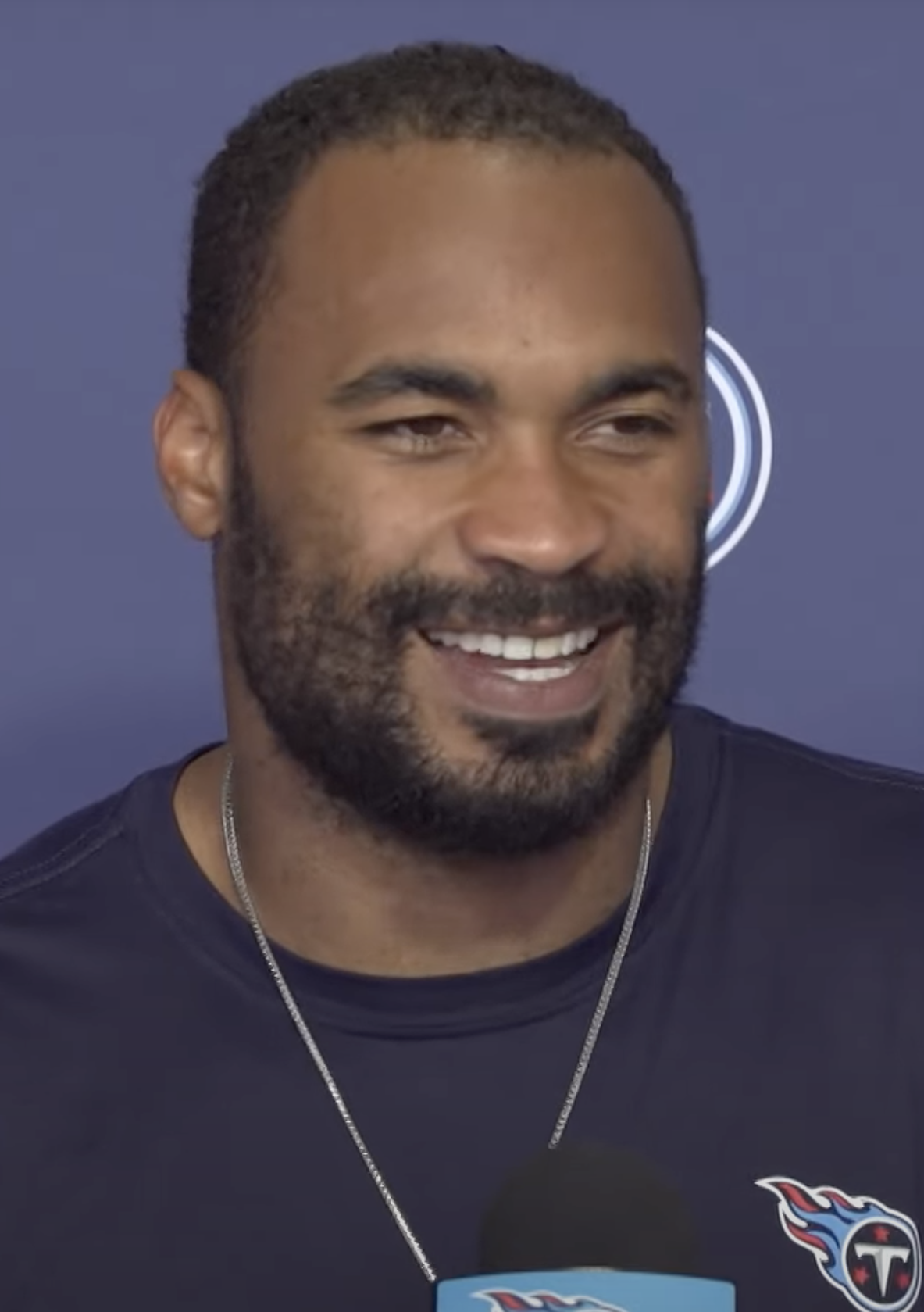
- Woods with the Tennessee Titans in 2022

Los Angeles Rams
- Title: Assistant wide receivers coach

Personal information
- Born: April 10, 1992 (age 34); Gardena, California, U.S.
- Listed height: 6 ft 0 in (1.83 m)
- Listed weight: 193 lb (88 kg)

Career information
- Position: Wide receiver (No. 17, 10, 2)
- High school: Junípero Serra (Gardena)
- College: USC (2010–2012)
- NFL draft: 2013: 2nd round, 41st overall pick

Career history

Playing
- Buffalo Bills (2013–2016); Los Angeles Rams (2017–2021); Tennessee Titans (2022); Houston Texans (2023–2024); Pittsburgh Steelers (2025)*
- * Offseason or practice squad member only

Coaching
- Los Angeles Rams (2026–present) Assistant wide receivers coach

Awards and highlights
- Super Bowl champion (LVI); Consensus All-American (2011); 2× First-team All-Pac-10/Pac-12 (2010, 2011); Second-team All-Pac-12 (2012)

Career NFL statistics
- Receptions: 683
- Receiving yards: 8,233
- Receiving touchdowns: 38
- Stats at Pro Football Reference

Robert Thomas Woods (born April 10, 1992) is an American professional football coach and former player who is the assistant wide receivers coach for the Los Angeles Rams in the National Football League (NFL). He played 12 seasons as a wide receiver in the NFL. He played college football for the USC Trojans, earning consensus All-American honors in 2011. Woods was selected by the Buffalo Bills in the second round of the 2013 NFL draft. He signed with the Rams in 2017, winning Super Bowl LVI. Woods was also a member of the Tennessee Titans, Houston Texans, and Pittsburgh Steelers.

== Early life ==
Woods was born in Gardena, California on April 10, 1992. He attended and played high school football and ran track at Junípero Serra High School in Gardena, California, where he was teammates with George Farmer and Marqise Lee. As a junior in 2008, Woods had 81 receptions for 1,378 yards and 19 touchdowns to go along with 15 carries for 124 rushing yards on offense. He also had 87 tackles, seven interceptions, and a fumble recovery on defense.

As a senior in 2009, Woods caught 66 passes for 1,112 yards, had five carries for 70 yards, and had 96 total tackles along with eight interceptions and a forced fumble on defense for the Serra Cavaliers. The team won the CIF Southern Section Northwestern Division Championship defeating west coast power house Oaks Christian, ending their winning streak at 34. His team would then play and beat Marin Catholic 24–20 to win the CIF Division 3 state championship and complete the season undefeated 15–0. They ranked fifth in the West according to USA Today. Following his senior year, Woods was recognized as a USA Today high school All-American and played in the 2010 U.S. Army All-American Bowl.

As an accomplished sprinter, Woods was a 2010 All-USA high school track & field selection by USA Today. He recorded personal bests of 21.04 seconds in the 200 meter dash, and 46.17 seconds in the 400 meter dash. Woods' 400 meters time of 46.17 ranked him #11 on the 2010 World Junior list, #4 in the USA. At the 2010 CIF California State Meet, Woods finished runner-up in the 400 metres to Joshua Mance in a photo finish. He placed third in the 200 metres, behind Remontay McClain and Davonte Stewart. Woods had career-bests of 21.04 seconds in the 200 metres and 46.17 seconds in the 400 metres. He graduated in 2010. Scout.com rated him as the No. 11 prospect overall and No. 1 wide receiver prospect. Rivals.com listed Woods as the nation's No. 6 overall recruit, and the No. 1-ranked athlete. He accepted a scholarship to attend the University of Southern California.

== College career ==
Woods played college football for the USC Trojans football from 2010 to 2012 under head coach Lane Kiffin.

=== 2010 season ===
Woods was an immediate contributor for the Trojans as a freshman. In his first collegiate game, at Hawaii, Woods had four receptions for 46 yards. On September 18 against Minnesota, he had his first collegiate touchdown on a 97-yard kickoff return. The following week against Washington State, he scored his first collegiate receiving touchdown, a 11-yard reception from quarterback Matt Barkley. Two weeks later, Woods had a breakout performance with 12 receptions for 224 yards and three touchdowns against Stanford. On October 16, he had seven receptions for 116 yards and two touchdowns against California.

Woods finished his freshman year with 65 receptions for 792 yards and six touchdowns. He was also a prolific kickoff returner, finishing first in the Pac-10 that year in kickoff returns with 38 and kickoff return yards with 971.

=== 2011 season ===
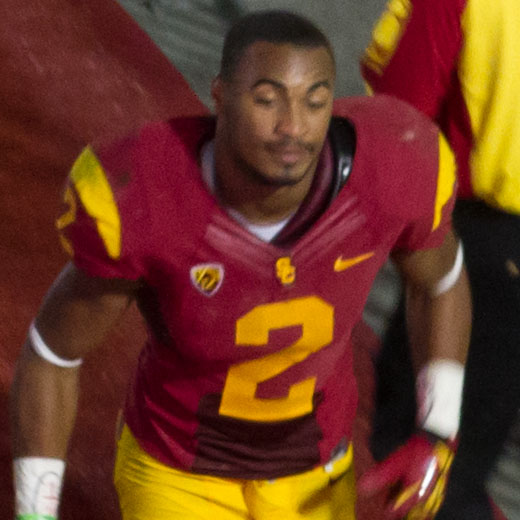
Woods in 2012

Woods started his sophomore season with a strong performance against Minnesota with 17 receptions for 177 yards and three touchdowns. On September 24, in a game at Arizona State, he recorded eight receptions for 131 yards. The following week against Arizona, Woods had a stellar performance with 14 receptions for 255 yards and two touchdowns. On October 22, against Notre Dame, he caught 12 passes for 119 yards and two touchdowns. Two weeks later against Colorado, he had nine receptions for 130 yards and two touchdowns. On November 19, Woods recorded seven receptions for 53 yards and two touchdowns against Oregon. The following week against UCLA, he had 12 receptions for 113 yards and two touchdowns.

Woods finished his sophomore season with 111 receptions for 1,292 yards and 15 touchdowns. He led the Pac-12 in receptions and receiving touchdowns and finished fourth in the conference in receiving yards. As a result of his stellar sophomore season, Woods was one of three finalists for the 2011 Biletnikoff Award and Maxwell Award. He was also named as a Consensus All-American.

=== 2012 season ===
Woods started his junior season with six receptions for 42 yards and two touchdowns against Hawaii. In the next game against Syracuse, he caught 10 passes for 93 yards and two touchdowns. Over the next four games, Woods had 20 receptions for 225 yards and a touchdown. On October 20, against Colorado, he recorded eight receptions for 132 yards and four touchdowns. In the final five games of the season, Woods finished with 30 receptions for 357 yards and two touchdowns. Woods declared for the 2013 NFL Draft after his junior season.

== Professional career ==
=== Pre-draft ===
Prior to his junior season in April 2012, Woods was projected a top five prospect and ranked as the top wide receiver prospect in the next NFL draft. By mid-season, Woods' draft projection fell to the late first round, due to his declining role in the Trojans' offense and the emergence of Marqise Lee.

External videos
- Robert Woods' NFL Combine Workout

Pre-draft measurables
Height	Weight	Arm length	Hand span	Wingspan	40-yard dash	10-yard split	20-yard split	20-yard shuttle	Three-cone drill	Vertical jump	Broad jump	Bench press	Wonderlic
6 ft 0 3/8 in (1.84 m)	201 lb (91 kg)	31 in (0.79 m)	9 1/4 in (0.23 m)	6 ft 1 1/8 in (1.86 m)	4.51 s	1.62 s	2.67 s	4.36 s	7.15 s	33.5 in (0.85 m)	9 ft 9 in (2.97 m)	14 reps	23
All values from NFL Combine/Pro Day

=== Buffalo Bills ===
External videos
- Bills draft Robert Woods 41st overall
- NFL Draft Profile: Robert Woods

==== 2013 season ====
The Buffalo Bills selected Woods in the second round (41st overall) of the 2013 NFL draft. Woods was the fifth wide receiver drafted and was the first of two wide receivers selected by the Bills in 2013, before third round pick (78th overall) Marquise Goodwin. On May 20, 2013, the Bills signed Woods to a four-year, $4.86 million contract with $2.49 million guaranteed and a signing bonus of $1.91 million.

Throughout training camp, Woods competed to be the secondary starting wide receiver against T. J. Graham and Brad Smith. Head coach Doug Marrone named Stevie Johnson and Woods the starting wide receivers to begin the regular season.

Woods made his NFL debut and first career start in the season-opener against the New England Patriots and caught his first NFL touchdown on an 18-yard pass from quarterback E. J. Manuel during the narrow 23–21 loss. The touchdown also marked his first career reception. During Week 9, Woods recorded four receptions for 44 yards before leaving in the third quarter of a 23–13 loss to the Kansas City Chiefs due to an ankle injury. He remained inactive for the next two games (Weeks 10–11). During Week 15, Woods caught a season-high five passes for 82 yards and scored his third touchdown of the season in a 27–20 road victory over the Jacksonville Jaguars. In the next game, Woods was ejected for throwing a punch at safety Reshad Jones after the two engaged in a tussle during the Bills' 19–0 shut-out victory over the Miami Dolphins.

Woods finished his rookie year with 40 receptions for 587 yards and three touchdowns in 14 games and starts.

==== 2014 season ====
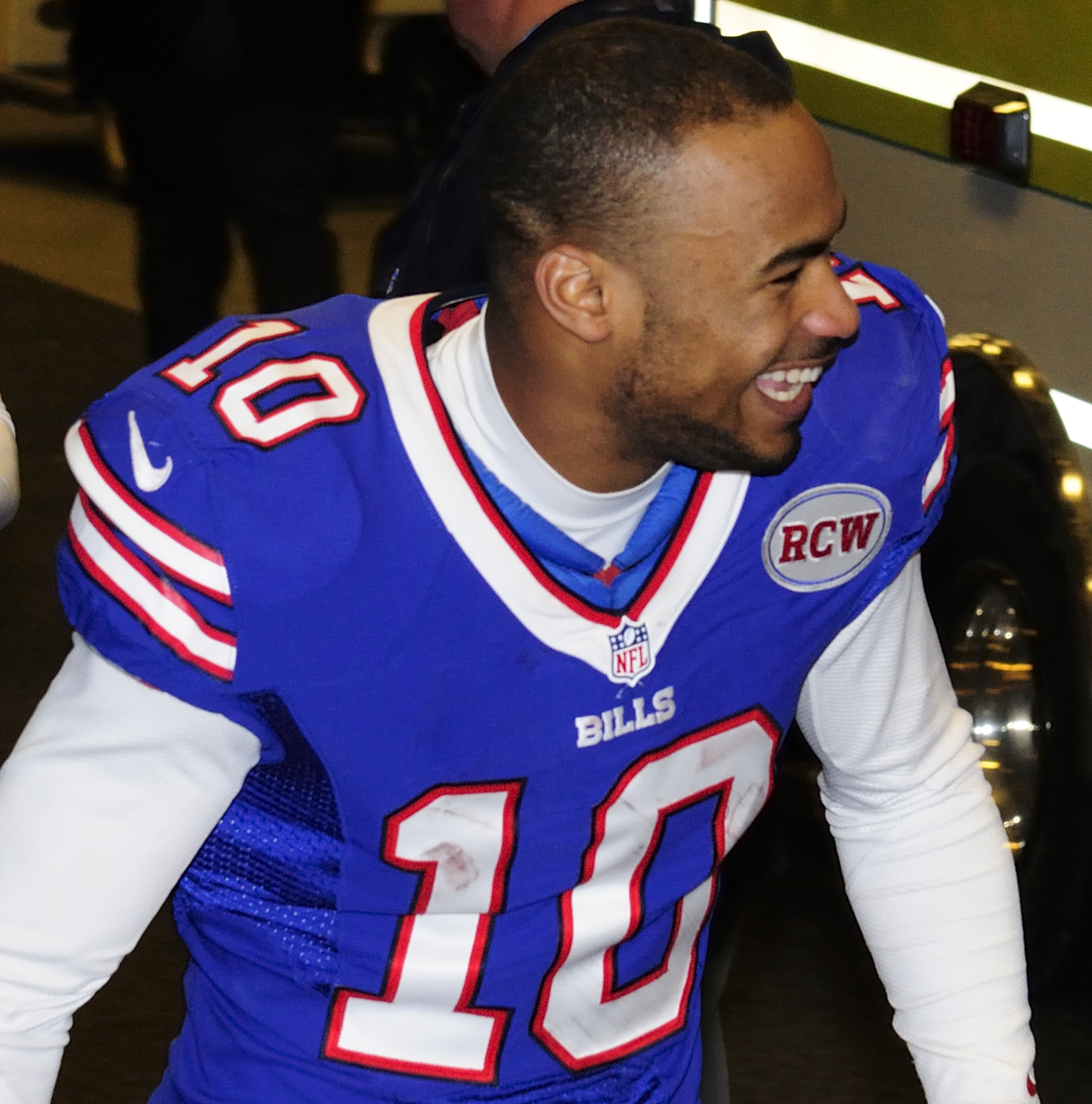
Woods in 2014

During training camp, Woods competed to retain his role as a starting wide receiver against Mike Williams and Chris Hogan. Marrone named Woods and rookie Sammy Watkins as the starting wide receivers to begin the regular season, although Williams started at wide receiver in all four preseason games.

During a Week 14 38–3 victory over the New York Jets, Woods recorded a season-high nine receptions for 118 yards and a touchdown. The game took place at Ford Field in Detroit due to a snowstorm in New York.

Woods finished his second professional season with a career-high 65 receptions for 699 yards and five touchdowns in 16 games and 15 starts. He finished second on the team in all three categories and also recorded four combined tackles on special teams.

==== 2015 season ====
On January 1, 2015, head coach Doug Marrone chose to opt out of his contract and resigned from his head coaching position. On January 13, the Bills announced their decision to hire former New York Jets' head coach Rex Ryan as their new head coach. Woods competed against Percy Harvin to be the No. 2 starting wide receiver during training camp. Ryan named Woods the third wide receiver on the Bills' depth chart to start the regular season in 2015, behind Sammy Watkins and Percy Harvin. Woods replaced Harvin in the starting lineup after Harvin was placed on injured reserve due to a season-ending knee injury.

During Week 7, Woods caught a season-high nine passes for 84 yards and a touchdown during a narrow 34–31 road loss against the Jaguars. During Week 14, he had five receptions for a season-high 106 yards in a 26–20 road loss against the Philadelphia Eagles. On December 22, 2015, Woods was placed on injured reserve after he aggravated a groin injury he sustained during training camp. His injury sidelined him for the last two games (Weeks 16–17) of the regular season.

Woods finished his first season under new offensive coordinator Greg Roman with 47 receptions for 552 yards and three touchdowns in 14 games and nine starts.

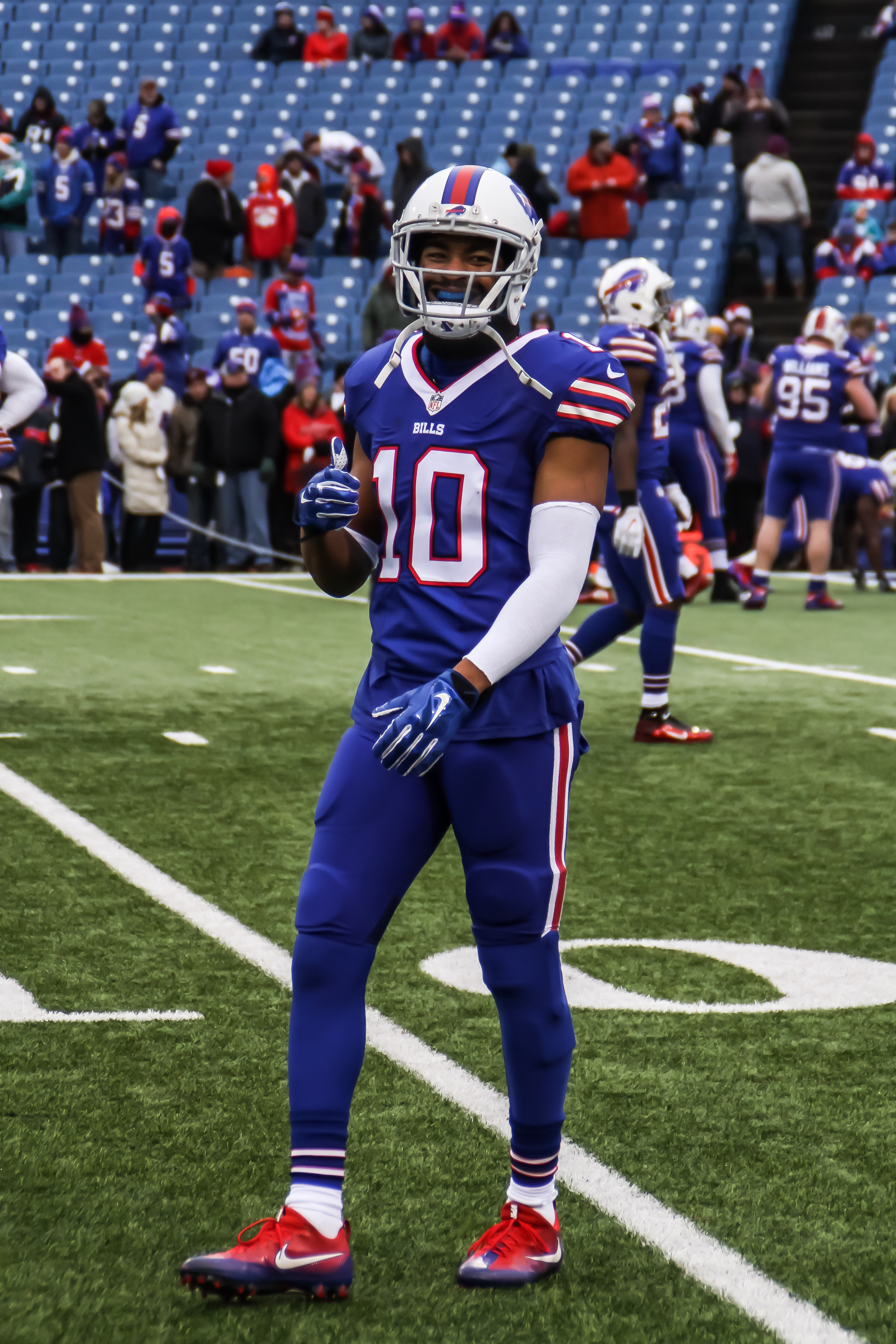
Woods in 2016

==== 2016 season ====
Woods entered training camp as a starting wide receiver in 2016. Rex Ryan retained Woods and Sammy Watkins as the starting wide receiver tandem to begin the regular season in 2016.

Woods was inactive for the Bills' Week 7 road loss to the Dolphins due to a foot injury. Two weeks later, he caught a season-high 10 passes for 162 yards in a 31–25 road loss against the Seattle Seahawks. Woods was sidelined for two games (Weeks 12–13) due to a knee injury.

Woods finished his fourth season with 51 receptions for 613 yards and a touchdown in 13 games and ten starts.

=== Los Angeles Rams ===
==== 2017 season ====
On March 9, 2017, Woods was signed by the Los Angeles Rams to a five-year, $34 million contract that includes $15 million guaranteed. Woods entered training camp slated as the No. 1 starting wide receiver. Head coach Sean McVay named Woods and Sammy Watkins the starting wide receivers to begin the regular season.

During Week 3, Woods caught six passes for 108 yards in a 41–39 road victory over the 49ers on Thursday Night Football. In Week 8, he had four receptions for 70 yards and caught two touchdowns during a 51–17 road victory over the New York Giants. The performance marked Woods' first multi-touchdown game of his career. In the next game, Woods recorded eight receptions for a season-high 171 yards and two touchdowns in a 33–7 victory over the Houston Texans. During the game, he caught a 94-yard touchdown reception to set a franchise record for the longest touchdown reception since 1964. It was the most receiving yards by a Rams player since Torry Holt had 200 receiving yards in a 2003 game against the 49ers. The following week, Woods caught a season-high eight passes for 81 yards during a 24–7 road loss to the Minnesota Vikings. He sustained a shoulder injury in the fourth quarter and was inactive for the next three games (Weeks 12–14). McVay decided to rest Woods and multiple starters for the regular-season finale against the 49ers in preparation for the playoffs.

Woods finished his first season with the Rams with 56 receptions for a career-high 781 yards and five touchdowns in 12 games and 11 starts. The Rams finished the 2017 season atop the NFC West with an 11–5 record and qualified for the playoffs. On January 6, 2018, Woods started in his first NFL playoff game and caught a game-high nine passes for 142 yards during a 26–13 loss to the Atlanta Falcons in the Wild Card Round.

==== 2018 season: Super Bowl appearance ====
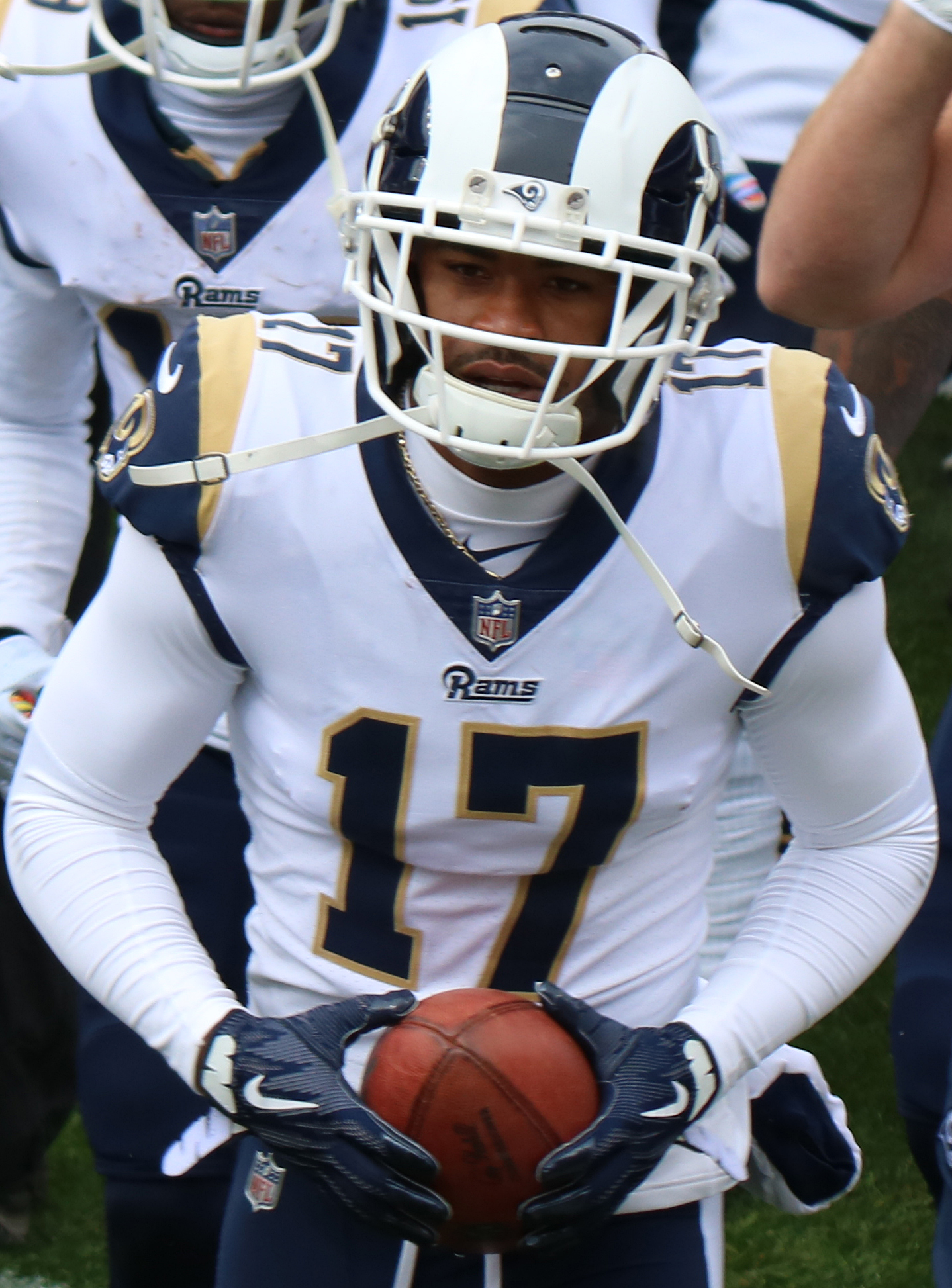
Woods in 2018

Woods returned as the Rams' No. 1 wide receiver and started alongside second-year receiver Cooper Kupp and offseason acquisition Brandin Cooks.

During Week 3, Woods caught ten receptions for 104 yards and two touchdowns in a 35–23 victory over the Los Angeles Chargers. In the next game against the Vikings, he had five receptions for 101 yards and a touchdown in the 38–31 victory. Two weeks later, Woods had seven receptions for 109 yards in a 23–20 road victory over the Denver Broncos. During Week 14 against the Chicago Bears, he caught seven passes for 61 yards as the Rams lost 15–6. Woods reached 1,000 receiving yards for the season for the first time in his career in this game.

Woods finished the 2018 season with 86 receptions for 1,219 yards and six touchdowns in 16 games and starts. In the playoffs, Woods helped the Rams defeat the Dallas Cowboys in the Divisional Round with six receptions for 69 yards in a 30–22 victory. He had six receptions for 33 yards as the Rams defeated the New Orleans Saints on the road in overtime by a score of 26–23 during the controversial NFC Championship Game to reach Super Bowl LIII, where they faced the Patriots. In the Super Bowl, Woods recorded five receptions for 70 yards and a five-yard rush but the Rams lost by a score of 13–3 in the lowest-scoring Super Bowl in history. He was ranked 76th by his fellow players on the NFL Top 100 Players of 2019.

==== 2019 season ====
During Week 4 against the Tampa Bay Buccaneers, Woods caught 13 passes for 164 yards in the 55–40 loss. During Week 13 against the Arizona Cardinals, he had 13 receptions for 172 yards in a 34–7 victory. In the next game against the Seahawks, Woods rushed twice for 29 yards and caught seven passes for 98 yards and his first touchdown of the season during the 28–12 victory. During Week 16 against the 49ers, he finished with eight receptions for 117 yards as the Rams lost on the road 34–31 and were eliminated from playoff contention.

Woods finished the 2019 season with 90 receptions for 1,134 yards and two touchdowns in 15 games and starts.

==== 2020 season ====
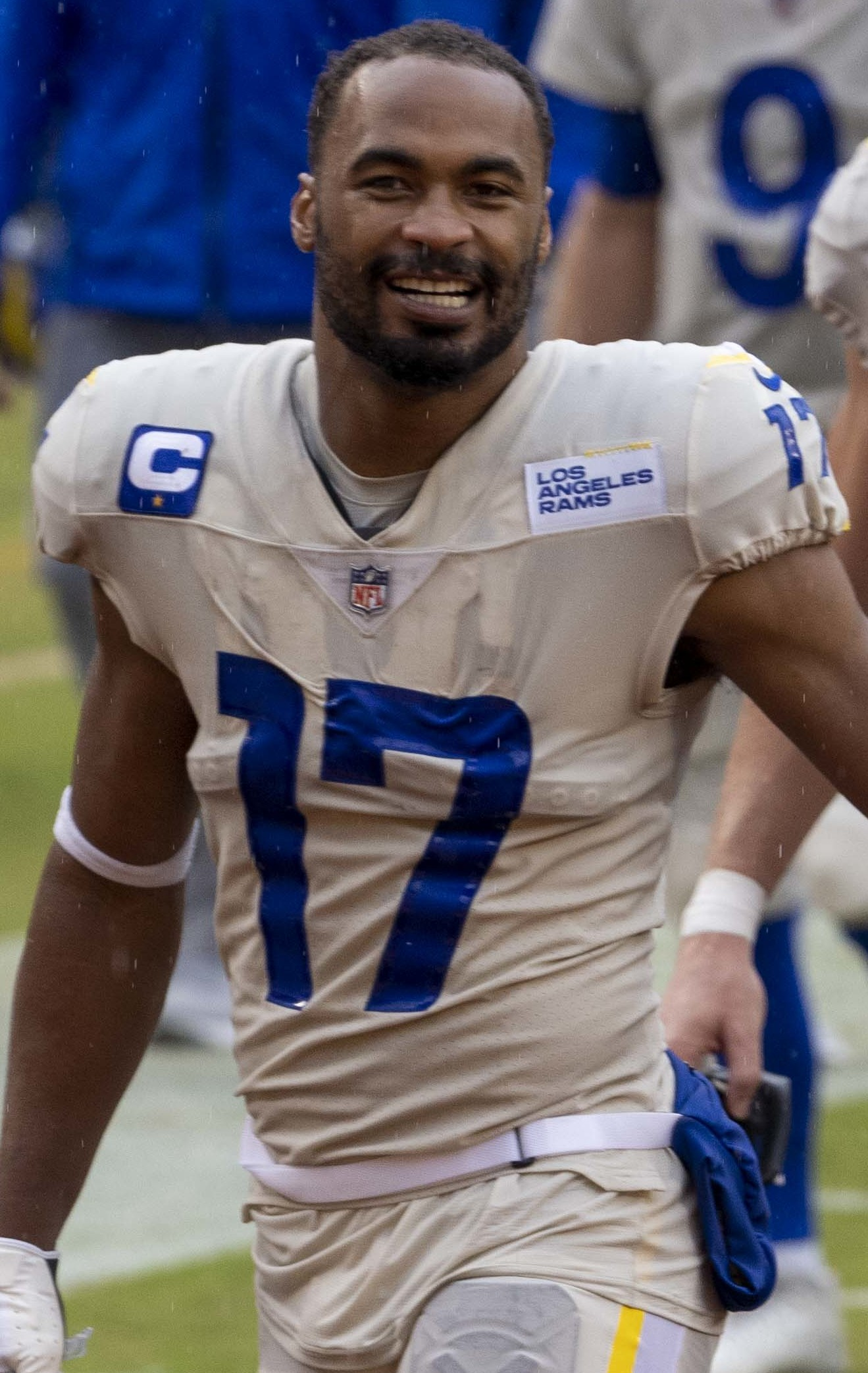
Woods in 2020

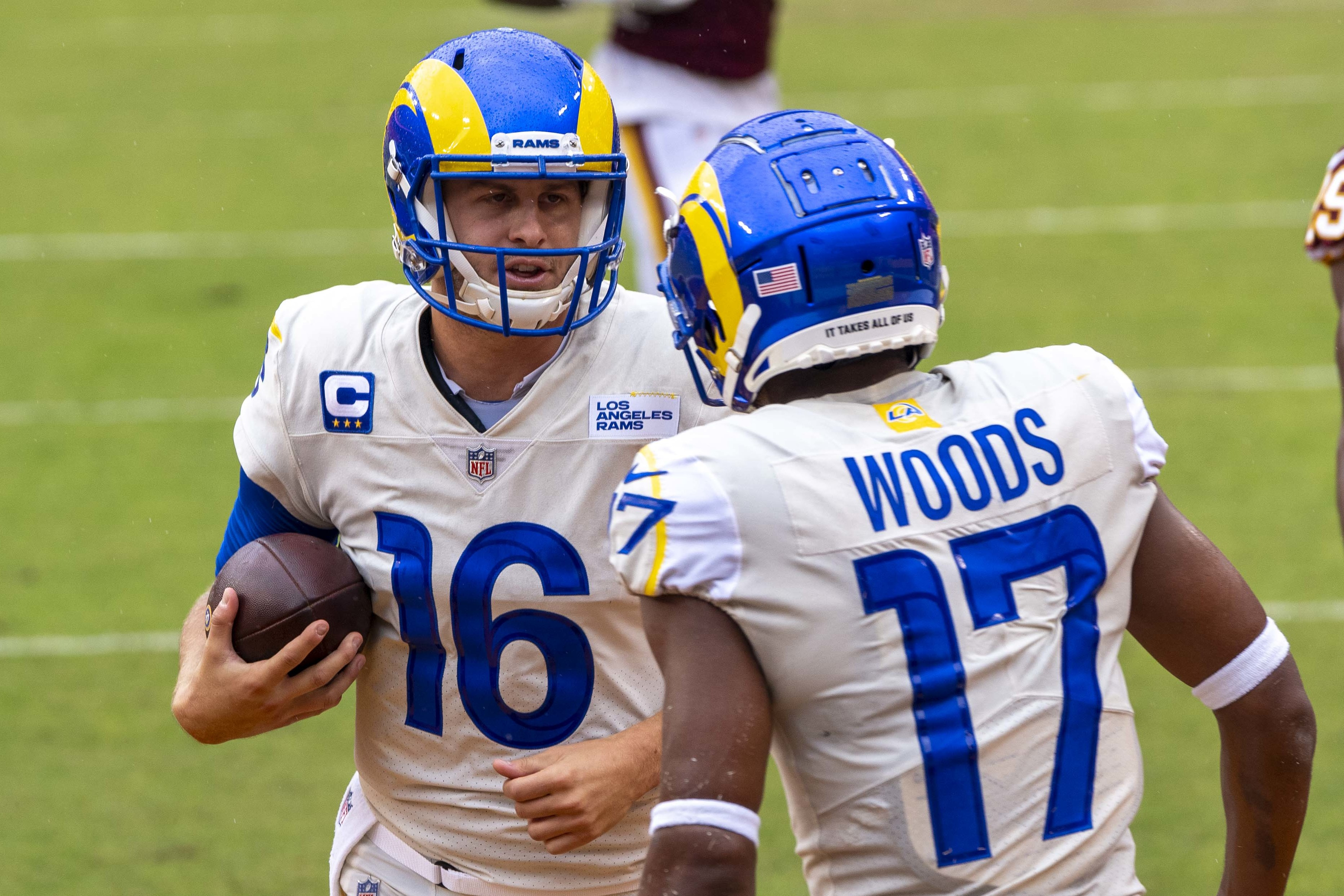
Woods with Jared Goff in 2020

Woods started off the 2020 season with six receptions for 105 yards in a 20–17 victory over the Cowboys on Sunday Night Football. On September 18, 2020, Woods signed a four-year, $65 million contract extension with the Rams. In Week 11 against the Buccaneers on Monday Night Football, Woods recorded 12 catches for 130 yards and a touchdown during the 27–24 road victory. He was named the NFC Offensive Player of the Week for his performance.

Woods finished the 2020 season with 90 receptions for 936 yards and six touchdowns to go along with 24 carries for 155 yards and two touchdowns. The Rams made the playoffs and earned the #6-seed in the NFC. During the Wild Card Round against the Seahawks, Woods had four receptions for 48 yards and a touchdown in the 30–20 road victory.

==== 2021 season: Injury-shortened season ====
On November 12, 2021, Woods tore his ACL during practice, ending his season. Prior to his injury, Woods had 45 catches for 556 and five touchdowns in nine games. The Rams went on to win Super Bowl LVI against the Cincinnati Bengals with Woods on injured reserve. Coincidentally, the Rams signed Odell Beckham Jr., who would play a crucial role in their Super Bowl run, the day before Woods' injury.

=== Tennessee Titans ===
On March 19, 2022, Woods was traded to the Tennessee Titans for a 2023 sixth-round pick (which was later used to draft Ochaun Mathis). He finished the season as the Titans leading receiver, despite career-low numbers, with 53 catches for 527 yards and two touchdowns. The Titans released Woods on February 22, 2023.

=== Houston Texans ===
On March 14, 2023, Woods signed a two-year contract with the Texans. In the 2023 season, Woods appeared in 14 games and started 11. He finished with 40 receptions for 426 yards and a touchdown.

In the 2024 season, Woods finished with 20 receptions for 203 yards.

=== Pittsburgh Steelers ===
On April 28, 2025, Woods signed a one-year contract with the Steelers worth $2 million. On August 26, he was released by the Steelers as part of final roster cuts, but was re-signed to the practice squad the next day. On September 2, Woods requested and was granted his release from the practice squad.

On February 17, 2026, Woods signed a one-day contract to retire as a member of the Rams.

== Career statistics ==
=== NFL ===
Legend
	Won the Super Bowl
**Bold**	Career high

==== Regular season ====
Year	Team	Games		Receiving					Rushing					Fumbles	
Year	Team	GP	GS	Rec	Yds	Avg	Lng	TD	Att	Yds	Avg	Lng	TD	Fum	Lost
2013	BUF	14	14	40	587	14.7	57	3	2	16	8.0	13	0	0	0
2014	BUF	**16**	15	65	699	10.8	37	5	—	—	—	—	—	1	**1**
2015	BUF	14	9	47	552	11.7	37	3	1	0	0.0	0	0	2	**1**
2016	BUF	13	10	51	613	12.0	34	1	1	6	6.0	6	0	0	0
2017	LAR	12	11	56	781	13.9	**94T**	5	2	12	6.0	8	0	1	**1**
2018	LAR	**16**	**16**	86	**1,219**	**14.2**	39T	**6**	19	**157**	**8.3**	**56**	1	0	0
2019	LAR	15	15	**90**	1,134	12.6	48	2	17	115	6.8	20	1	0	0
2020	LAR	**16**	**16**	**90**	936	10.4	56	**6**	**24**	155	6.5	40	**2**	2	**1**
2021	LAR	9	9	45	556	12.4	28	4	8	46	5.8	16	1	0	0
2022	TEN	17	17	53	527	9.9	41	2	—	—	—	—	—	1	**1**
2023	HOU	14	11	40	426	10.7	26	1	1	7	7.0	7	0	0	0
2024	HOU	15	4	20	203	10.2	32	0	—	—	—	—	—	**3**	**1**
Career		171	145	683	8,233	12.1	94	38	75	514	6.9	56	5	10	6

==== Postseason ====
Year	Team	Games		Receiving					Rushing					Fumbles	
Year	Team	GP	GS	Rec	Yds	Avg	Lng	TD	Att	Yds	Avg	Lng	TD	Fum	Lost
2017	LAR	1	1	9	142	**15.8**	**38**	0	—	—	—	—	—	0	0
2018	LAR	**3**	**3**	**17**	**172**	10.1	18	0	**4**	**11**	**2.8**	**9**	0	0	0
2020	LAR	2	2	12	96	8.0	20	**1**	1	−3	−3.0	0	0	0	0
2021	LAR	0	0	Did not play due to injury											
2023	HOU	2	1	2	17	8.5	11	0	—	—	—	—	—	0	0
2024	HOU	2	0	2	22	11.0	13	0	—	—	—	—	—	0	0
Total		10	7	42	449	10.7	38	1	5	8	1.6	9	0	0	0

=== College ===
Season	Team	GP	Receiving				Rushing			
Season	Team	GP	Rec	Yds	Avg	TD	Att	Yds	Avg	TD
2010	USC	13	65	792	12.2	6	6	50	8.3	0
2011	USC	12	111	1,292	11.6	15	7	16	2.3	0
2012	USC	13	76	846	11.1	11	1	76	76.0	0
Career		38	253	2,930	11.6	32	14	142	10.1	0

== Coaching career ==
On February 23, 2026, less than a week after retiring from professional football, Woods joined the coaching staff of the Los Angeles Rams as an assistant wide receivers coach.

== Personal life ==
Woods is the son of Robert Woods, who played for the Houston Oilers in 1978 and Detroit Lions in 1979.

Woods lost his sister, Olivia, to cancer on April 19, 2007. Her death and final words to him motivated Woods to pursue his goals of making it into the NFL and finishing his college degree. Woods honored her in his commencement speech upon graduating from USC.

On July 7, 2018, Woods married longtime partner Alexandra Barbee.
