= Davonte =

Davonte, DaVonte or DaVonté is an English-language masculine given name, possibly a variant of Devonte and Devante. Notable people with the given name include:

- Davonte Burnett (born 2000), Jamaican track and field athlete
- Davonte Davis (born 2001), American basketball player
- Davonte Howell (born 2005), Caymanian sprinter
- DaVonté Lacy (born 1993), American basketball player
- DaVonte Lambert (born 1994), American football player
- Davonte Stewart (born 1993), American sprinter
- Davonte Wallace (born 1991), Canadian football player

== See also ==
- Devontae
- Devonta
