= 2013 Buffalo Bills season =

54th season in franchise history; final one under ownership of Ralph Wilson

- Owner: Ralph Wilson
- General manager: Buddy Nix, Doug Whaley
- Head coach: Doug Marrone
- Home stadium: Ralph Wilson Stadium

Results
- Record: 6–10
- Division place: 4th AFC East
- Playoffs: Did not qualify
- Pro Bowlers: Mario Williams; Kyle Williams; Jairus Byrd; Marcell Dareus

Uniform
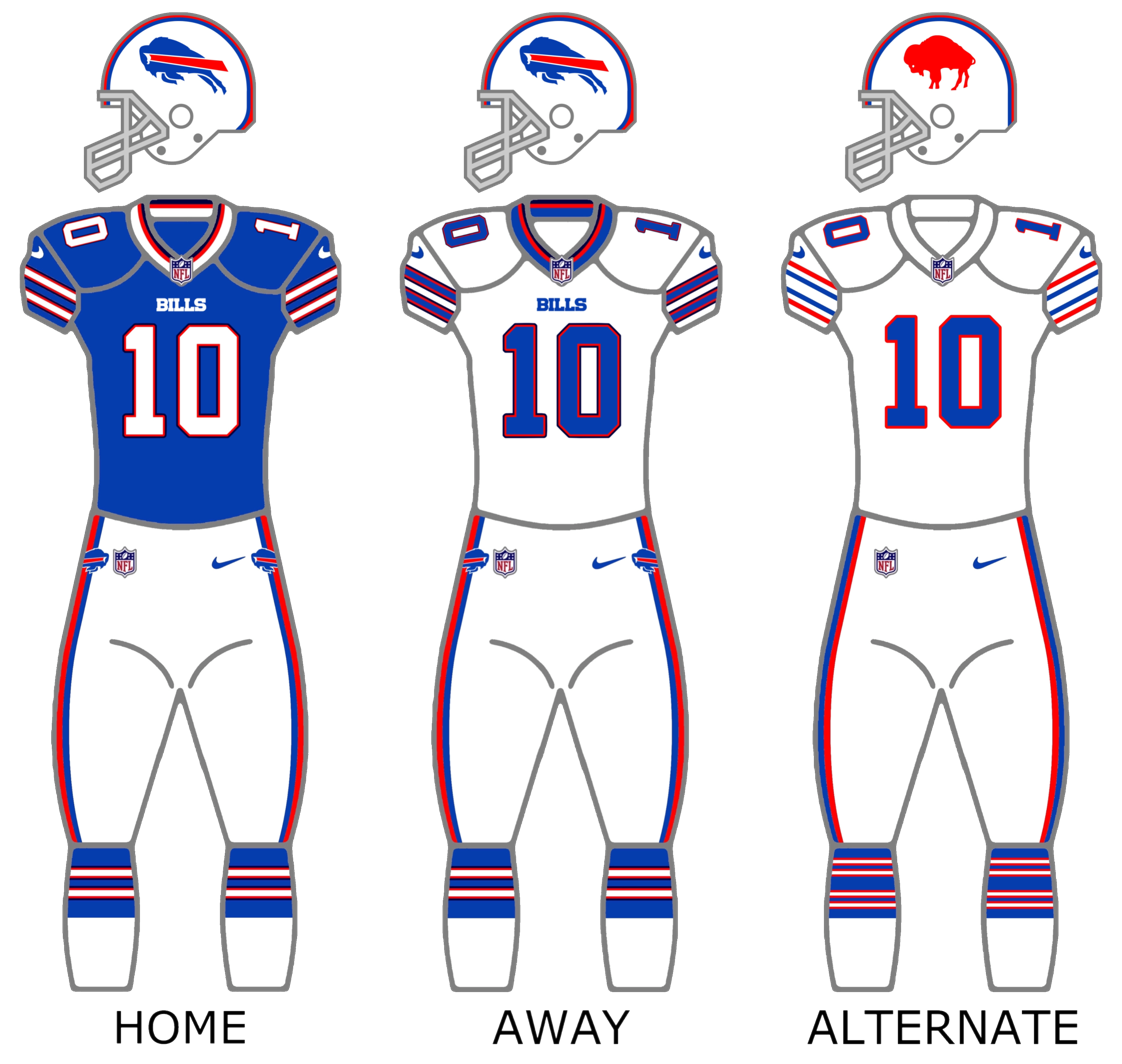

The 2013 season was the Buffalo Bills' 44th in the National Football League (NFL) and their first under head coach Doug Marrone. It was also their final season under the ownership of Ralph Wilson, who died on March 25, 2014, at the age of 95. The team equaled their record from 2012 and missed the playoffs, increasing their playoff drought to 14 seasons. This was the first year of renewed leases on Ralph Wilson Stadium and for the Bills Toronto Series, both of which were signed in the preceding offseason.

The Toronto series was originally set to expire in 2017, but was cancelled in December 2014; the lease on Ralph Wilson Stadium expired in 2022 and was presumably the last long-term agreement with the aging stadium, as the lease specifies that the process of exploring a new stadium began during the lease period. The Bills also started the 2013 season with a new starting quarterback, first-round draft pick EJ Manuel, after previous starter Ryan Fitzpatrick refused a pay cut and was subsequently released.

As of the 2025 season, this is the most recent season the Bills finished in last place in the AFC East.

After one season, the team's defensive coordinator, Mike Pettine, left to go to the Cleveland Browns to be their head coach, taking Jim Leonhard with him.

== 2013 draft ==
2013 Buffalo Bills draft
Round	Pick	Player	Position	College	Notes
1	16	EJ Manuel	QB	Florida State	Pick from STL^{[a]}
2	41	Robert Woods	WR	USC	
2	46	Kiko Alonso	LB	Oregon	Pick from STL^{[a]}
3	78	Marquise Goodwin	WR	Texas	Pick from STL^{[a]}
4	105	Duke Williams	S	Nevada	
5	143	Jonathan Meeks	S	Clemson	
6	177	Dustin Hopkins	K	Florida State	
7	222	Chris Gragg	TE	Arkansas	Pick from STL^{[b]}^{[a]}
Made roster † Pro Football Hall of Fame * Made at least one Pro Bowl during career

Notes

^{^[a]} The Bills traded their first- and third-round selections (8th and 71st overall) to the St. Louis Rams in exchange for the Rams' first-, second-, third- and seventh-round selections (16th, 46th, 78th and 222nd overall).
^{^[b]} The Bills traded their original seventh-round selection (214th overall) to the Seattle Seahawks in exchange for quarterback Tarvaris Jackson.

== Staff ==
2013 Buffalo Bills staff
Front office: Owner – Ralph Wilson; President/CEO – Russ Brandon; General manager – Buddy Nix/Doug Whaley; Senior Vice-president of Football Administration – Jim Overdorf; Special assistant – Buddy Nix; Director of pro personnel – Jim Monos; Director of pro personnel – Tom Gibbons; Pro Personnel Coordinator – Rob Hanrahan; Director of college scouting – Chuck Cook; Asst. Director of College Scouting – Kelvin Fisher; Director of Football Administration - Don Purdy; Contract Administrator/Football Analyst – Kevin Meganck; Director of Analytics – Michael Lyons; Head coaches: Head coach – Doug Marrone; Assistant to the head coach – Stephen Brown; Offensive coaches: Offensive coordinator – Nathaniel Hackett; Running backs – Tyrone Wheatley; Wide receivers – Ike Hilliard; Tight ends – Greg Adkins; Offensive line – Pat Morris; Offensive quality control – Kurt Anderson; Offensive quality control – Jason Vrable	Defensive coaches: Defensive coordinator – Mike Pettine; Defensive line – Anthony Weaver; Linebackers – Chuck Driesbach; Linebackers – Jim O'Neil; Defensive backs – Donnie Henderson; Assistant defensive backs – Samson Brown; Defensive quality control – Brian Fleury; Defensive quality control – Jason Rebrovich; Special teams coaches: Special teams coordinator – Danny Crossman; Special teams assistant – John Anselmo; Strength and conditioning: Head strength and conditioning – Eric Ciano; Assistant strength and conditioning – Hal Luther; Strength and conditioning assistant – Dan Liburd

== Final roster ==
2013 Buffalo Bills roster
Quarterbacks (QB): 9 Thad Lewis; 3 EJ Manuel; 7 Jeff Tuel; Running backs (RB): 22 Fred Jackson; 28 C. J. Spiller; 38 Frank Summers FB; 42 Ronnie Wingo; Wide receivers (WR): 81 Marcus Easley; 88 Marquise Goodwin; 11 T. J. Graham; 15 Chris Hogan; 13 Stevie Johnson; 14 Cordell Roberson; 10 Robert Woods; Tight ends (TE): 84 Scott Chandler; 89 Chris Gragg; 48 Evan Rodriguez; 82 Tony Moeaki; 85 Lee Smith	Offensive linemen (OL): 62 Mark Asper G; 77 Cordy Glenn T; 59 Doug Legursky G; 73 Antoine McClain G; 79 Erik Pears T; 64 J. J. Unga G; 60 Kraig Urbik G; 66 Thomas Welch T; 70 Eric Wood C; Defensive linemen (DL): 90 Alan Branch DE; 97 Corbin Bryant DT; 96 Stefan Charles DT; 99 Marcell Dareus DT; 95 Kyle Williams DT; 94 Mario Williams DE	Linebackers (LB): 50 Kiko Alonso MLB; 53 Nigel Bradham OLB; 55 Jerry Hughes OLB; 91 Manny Lawson OLB; 52 Arthur Moats OLB; 57 Ty Powell MLB; Defensive backs (DB): 33 Ron Brooks CB; 31 Jairus Byrd FS; 24 Stephon Gilmore CB; 35 Jim Leonhard SS; 21 Leodis McKelvin CB; 37 Nickell Robey CB; 36 Jonathan Meeks SS; 25 Da'Norris Searcy FS; 44 Brandon Smith CB; 27 Duke Williams FS; Special teams (ST): 2 Dan Carpenter K; 8 Brian Moorman P; 65 Garrison Sanborn LS	Practice squad: 30 Mario Butler CB; 72 Edawn Coughman T; 6 Dennis Dixon QB; 98 Ike Igbinosun DE; 63 Jamaal Johnson-Webb T; 17 Brandon Kaufman WR; 56 Jacquies Smith LB; Reserve: 80 Mike Caussin TE (IR); 92 Alex Carrington DE (IR); 18 Kevin Elliott WR (IR); 75 Chris Hairston T (NF-Inj.); 5 Dustin Hopkins K (IR); 4 Kevin Kolb QB (IR); 23 Aaron Williams SS (IR); Rookies in italics 53 active, 7 reserve, 7 practice squad

== Schedule ==
=== Preseason ===
Week	Date	Opponent	Result	Record	Venue	Recap
1	August 11	at Indianapolis Colts	**W** 44–20	1–0	Lucas Oil Stadium	Recap
2	August 16	Minnesota Vikings	**W** 20–16	2–0	Ralph Wilson Stadium	Recap
3	August 24	at Washington Redskins	**L** 7–30	2–1	FedExField	Recap
4	August 29	Detroit Lions	**L** 13–35	2–2	Ralph Wilson Stadium	Recap

=== Regular season ===
Week	Date	Opponent	Result	Record	Venue	Recap
1	September 8	**New England Patriots**	**L** 21–23	0–1	Ralph Wilson Stadium	Recap
2	September 15	Carolina Panthers	**W** 24–23	1–1	Ralph Wilson Stadium	Recap
3	September 22	at **New York Jets**	**L** 20–27	1–2	MetLife Stadium	Recap
4	September 29	Baltimore Ravens	**W** 23–20	2–2	Ralph Wilson Stadium	Recap
5	October 3	at Cleveland Browns	**L** 24–37	2–3	FirstEnergy Stadium	Recap
6	October 13	Cincinnati Bengals	**L** 24–27 (OT)	2–4	Ralph Wilson Stadium	Recap
7	October 20	at **Miami Dolphins**	**W** 23–21	3–4	Sun Life Stadium	Recap
8	October 27	at New Orleans Saints	**L** 17–35	3–5	Mercedes-Benz Superdome	Recap
9	November 3	Kansas City Chiefs	**L** 13–23	3–6	Ralph Wilson Stadium	Recap
10	November 10	at Pittsburgh Steelers	**L** 10–23	3–7	Heinz Field	Recap
11	November 17	**New York Jets**	**W** 37–14	4–7	Ralph Wilson Stadium	Recap
12	Bye					
13	December 1	Atlanta Falcons	**L** 31–34 (OT)	4–8	(Canada) Rogers Centre (Toronto)	Recap
14	December 8	at Tampa Bay Buccaneers	**L** 6–27	4–9	Raymond James Stadium	Recap
15	December 15	at Jacksonville Jaguars	**W** 27–20	5–9	EverBank Field	Recap
16	December 22	**Miami Dolphins**	**W** 19–0	6–9	Ralph Wilson Stadium	Recap
17	December 29	at **New England Patriots**	**L** 20–34	6–10	Gillette Stadium	Recap

Note: Intra-division opponents are in bold text.

# Indicates that the game was part of the Bills Toronto Series.

=== Game summaries ===
==== Week 1: vs. New England Patriots ====
Week One: New England Patriots at Buffalo Bills – Game summary

Quarter	1	2	3	4	Total
**Patriots**	10	7	0	6	**23**
Bills	0	14	7	0	**21**

at Ralph Wilson Stadium, Orchard Park, New York

- Date: September 8
- Game time: 1:00 p.m. EDT
- Game weather: 65 °F (18 °C), sunny
- Game attendance: 65,519
- Referee: Walt Anderson
- TV announcers (CBS): Greg Gumbel, Dan Dierdorf and Tracy Wolfson
- Recap, Game book

Game information

**First quarter**

- NE – Julian Edelman 9-yard pass from Tom Brady (Stephen Gostkowski kick), 10:46. Patriots 7–0. **Drive: 3 plays, 16 yards, 0:47.**
- NE – Stephen Gostkowski 48-yard field goal, 4:47. Patriots 10–0. **Drive: 9 plays, 20 yards, 3:43.**

**Second quarter**

- BUF – Da'Norris Searcy 74-yard fumble return (Dan Carpenter kick), 8:25. Patriots 10–7.
- NE – Julian Edelman 8-yard pass from Tom Brady (Stephen Gostkowski kick), 1:55. Patriots 17–7. **Drive: 4 plays, 32 yards, 1:50.**
- BUF – Robert Woods 18-yard pass from EJ Manuel (Dan Carpenter kick), 0:34. Patriots 17–14. **Drive: 2 plays, 37 yards, 0:39.**

**Third quarter**

- BUF – Stevie Johnson 18-yard pass from EJ Manuel (Dan Carpenter kick), 11:03. Bills 21–17. **Drive: 11 plays, 80 yards, 3:57.**

**Fourth quarter**

- NE – Stephen Gostkowski 33-yard field goal, 10;48. Bills 21–20. **Drive: 9 plays, 70 yards, 3:29.**
- NE – Stephen Gostkowski 35-yard field goal, 0:05. Patriots 23–21. **Drive: 12 plays, 49 yards, 4:26.**

**Top passers**

- NE – Tom Brady – 29/52, 288 yards, 2 TD, INT
- BUF – EJ Manuel – 18/27, 150 yards, 2 TD

**Top rushers**

- NE – Shane Vereen – 14 rushes, 101 yards
- BUF – Fred Jackson – 13 rushes, 67 yards

**Top receivers**

- NE – Danny Amendola – 10 receptions, 104 yards
- BUF – Fred Jackson – 4 receptions, 41 yards

Stephen Gostkowski kicked a 35-yard field goal with five seconds left to give the Patriots the win.

With the loss, the Bills began the season 0–1.

==== Week 2: vs. Carolina Panthers ====
Week Two: Carolina Panthers at Buffalo Bills – Game summary

Quarter	1	2	3	4	Total
Panthers	0	7	7	9	**23**
**Bills**	0	3	11	10	**24**

at Ralph Wilson Stadium, Orchard Park, New York

- Date: September 15
- Game time: 1:00 p.m. EDT
- Game weather: 65 °F (18 °C), mostly cloudy
- Game attendance: 67,819
- Referee: Walt Coleman
- TV announcers (Fox): Dick Stockton, Ronde Barber and Kris Budden
- Recap, Game book

Game information

**First quarter**

- No scoring plays.

**Second quarter**

- BUF – Dan Carpenter 55-yard field goal, 10:41. Bills 3–0. **Drive: 10 plays, 43 yards, 4:04.**
- CAR – Greg Olsen 13-yard pass from Cam Newton (Graham Gano kick), 0:13. Panthers 7–3. **Drive: 10 plays, 90 yards, 1:54.**

**Third quarter**

- BUF – Dan Carpenter 20-yard field goal, 10:49. Panthers 7–6. **Drive: 14 plays, 78 yards, 4:11.**
- CAR – Ted Ginn Jr. 40-yard pass from Cam Newton (Graham Gano kick), 6:52. Panthers 14–6. **Drive: 8 plays, 80 yards, 3:57.**
- BUF – Fred Jackson 4-yard run (EJ Manuel–Robert Woods pass), 4:15. Tied 14–14. **Drive: 8 plays, 80 yards, 2:37.**

**Fourth quarter**

- CAR – Graham Gano 27-yard field goal, 12:44. Panthers 17–14. **Drive: 7 plays, 7 yards, 3:15.**
- CAR – Graham Gano 25-yard field goal, 8:41. Panthers 20–14. **Drive: 7 plays, 19 yards, 3:33.**
- BUF – Dan Carpenter 48-yard field goal, 7:13. Panthers 20–17. **Drive: 5 plays, 50 yards, 1:28.**
- CAR – Graham Gano 39-yard field goal, 1:38. Panthers 23–17. **Drive: 12 plays, 59 yards, 5:35.**
- BUF – Stevie Johnson 2-yard pass from EJ Manuel (Dan Carpenter kick), 0:02. Bills 24–23. **Drive: 9 plays, 80 yards, 1:36.**

**Top passers**

- CAR – Cam Newton – 21/38, 229 yards, 2 TD, INT
- BUF – EJ Manuel – 27/39, 296 yards, TD, INT

**Top rushers**

- CAR – DeAngelo Williams – 22 rushes, 85 yards
- BUF – C. J. Spiller – 16 rushes, 103 yards

**Top receivers**

- CAR – Greg Olsen – 7 receptions, 84 yards, TD
- BUF – Stevie Johnson – 8 receptions, 111 yards

Buffalo trailed for most of their Week 2 game against the Panthers but took the lead with two seconds left after Stevie Johnson caught a 2-yard touchdown pass from EJ Manuel. Dan Carpenter kicked the extra point to give the Bills a 24–23 win.

With the win, Buffalo improved to 1–1.

==== Week 3: at New York Jets ====
Week Three: Buffalo Bills at New York Jets – Game summary

Quarter	1	2	3	4	Total
Bills	0	6	6	8	**20**
**Jets**	7	10	3	7	**27**

at MetLife Stadium, East Rutherford, New Jersey

- Date: September 22
- Game time: 4:25 p.m. EDT
- Game weather: 67 °F (19 °C), cloudy
- Game attendance: 76,957
- Referee: Scott Green
- TV announcers (CBS): Marv Albert and Rich Gannon
- Recap, Game book

Game information

**First quarter**

- NYJ – Geno Smith 8-yard run (Nick Folk kick), 9:06. Jets 7–0. **Drive: 12 plays, 80 yards, 5:54.**

**Second quarter**

- BUF – Dan Carpenter 37-yard field goal, 13:45. Jets 7–3. **Drive: 7 plays, 70 yards, 2:17.**
- BUF – Dan Carpenter 23-yard field goal, 9:57. Jets 7–6. **Drive: 7 plays, 16 yards, 3:29.**
- NYJ – Stephen Hill 51-yard pass from Geno Smith (Nick Folk kick), 6:58. Jets 14–6. **6 plays, 80 yards, 2:59.**
- NYJ – Nick Folk 47-yard field goal, 0:00. Jets 17–6. **Drive: 5 plays, 37 yards, 0:43.**

**Third quarter**

- NYJ – Nick Folk 34-yard field goal, 9:48. Jets 20–6. **Drive: 8 plays, 64 yards, 3:47.**
- BUF – Dan Carpenter 43-yard field goal, 8:18. Jets 20–9. **Drive: 7 plays, 55 yards, 1:30.**
- BUF – Dan Carpenter 26-yard field goal, 5:35. Jets 20–12. **Drive: 4 plays, 5 yards, 1:15.**

**Fourth quarter**

- BUF – Scott Chandler 33-yard pass from EJ Manuel (EJ Manuel–Stevie Johnson pass), 10:39. Tied 20–20. **Drive: 6 plays, 80 yards, 2:43.**
- NYJ – Santonio Holmes 69-yard pass from Geno Smith (Nick Folk kick), 9:23. Jets 27–20. **Drive: 2 plays, 85 yards, 1:16.**

**Top passers**

- BUF – EJ Manuel – 19/42, 243 yards, TD
- NYJ – Geno Smith – 16/29, 331 yards, 2 TD, 2 INT

**Top rushers**

- BUF – Fred Jackson – 7 rushes, 72 yards
- NYJ – Bilal Powell – 27 rushes, 149 yards

**Top receivers**

- BUF – Stevie Johnson – 6 receptions, 86 yards
- NYJ – Santonio Holmes – 5 receptions, 154 yards, TD

With the loss, the Bills fell to 1–2.

==== Week 4: vs. Baltimore Ravens ====
Week Four: Baltimore Ravens at Buffalo Bills – Game summary

Quarter	1	2	3	4	Total
Ravens	0	7	7	6	**20**
**Bills**	6	14	3	0	**23**

at Ralph Wilson Stadium, Orchard Park, New York

- Date: September 29
- Game time: 1:00 p.m. EDT
- Game weather: 67 °F (19 °C), mostly sunny
- Game attendance: 68,296
- Referee: Jerome Boger
- TV announcers (CBS): Ian Eagle and Dan Fouts
- Recap, Game book

Game information

**First quarter**

- BUF – Dan Carpenter 27-yard field goal, 6:11. Bills 3–0. **Drive: 11 plays, 64 yards, 4:43.**
- BUF – Dan Carpenter 27-yard field goal, 3:03. Bills 6–0. **Drive: 5 plays, 16 yards, 2:26.**

**Second quarter**

- BAL – Marlon Brown 10-yard pass from Joe Flacco (Justin Tucker kick), 13:55. Ravens 7–6. **Drive: 3 plays, 27 yards, 0:54.**
- BUF – Robert Woods 42-yard pass from EJ Manuel (Dan Carpenter kick), 8:40. Bills 13–7. **Drive: 5 plays, 70 yards, 1:59.**
- BUF – Fred Jackson 16-yard run (Dan Carpenter kick), 6:52. Bills 20–7. **Drive: 4 plays, 28 yards, 1:13.**

**Third quarter**

- BAL – Torrey Smith 26-yard pass from Joe Flacco (Justin Tucker kick), 7:17. Bills 20–14. **Drive: 4 plays, 80 yards, 1:31.**
- BUF – Dan Carpenter 22-yard field goal, 1:56. Bills 23–14. **Drive: 9 plays, 44 yards, 2:57.**

**Fourth quarter**

- BAL – Justin Tucker 35-yard field goal, 7:12. Bills 23–17. **Drive: 5 plays, 74 yards, 1:21.**
- BAL – Justin Tucker 24-yard field goal, 4:04. Bills 23–20. **Drive: 5 plays, 50 yards, 1:39.**

**Top passers**

- BAL – Joe Flacco – 25/50, 347 yards, 2 TD, 5 INT
- BUF – EJ Manuel – 10/22, 167 yards, TD, 2 INT

**Top rushers**

- BAL – Fred Jackson – 16 rushes, 87 yards, TD
- BUF – Ray Rice – 5 rushes, 17 yards

**Top receivers**

- BAL – Torrey Smith – 5 receptions, 166 yards, TD
- BUF – Robert Woods – 4 receptions, 80 yards, TD

The Bills defense intercepted Ravens quarterback Joe Flacco five times in this game, as Flacco completed only 50% of his passes. Despite the five turnovers, the game was still somewhat close, but the Bills won the game 23–20.

With the win, the Bills improved to 2–2.

==== Week 5: at Cleveland Browns ====
Week Five: Buffalo Bills at Cleveland Browns – Game summary

Quarter	1	2	3	4	Total
Bills	10	0	14	0	**24**
**Browns**	0	17	7	13	**37**

at FirstEnergy Stadium, Cleveland, Ohio

- Date: October 3
- Game time: 8:25 p.m. EDT
- Game weather: 75 °F (24 °C), cloudy
- Game attendance: 71,239
- Referee: Pete Morelli
- TV announcers (NFLN^{[a]}): Brad Nessler, Mike Mayock and Alex Flanagan
- Recap, Game book

Game information

**First quarter**

- BUF – Fred Jackson 1-yard run (Dan Carpenter kick), 13:16. Bills 7–0. **Drive: 2 plays, 32 yards, 0:45.**
- BUF – Dan Carpenter 52-yard field goal, 5:51. Bills 10–0. **Drive: 12 plays, 56 yards, 4:14.**

**Second quarter**

- CLE – Billy Cundiff 30-yard field goal, 14:24. Bills 10–3. **Drive: 7 plays, 19 yards, 2:12.**
- CLE – Willis McGahee 1-yard run (Billy Cundiff kick), 3:52. Tied 10–10. **Drive: 14 plays, 74 yards, 7:10.**
- CLE – Travis Benjamin 79-yard punt return (Billy Cundiff kick), 2:20. Browns 17–10.

**Third quarter**

- BUF – C. J. Spiller 54-yard run (Dan Carpenter kick), 13:51. Tied 17–17. **Drive: 3 plays, 80 yards, 1:59.**
- BUF – Fred Jackson 1-yard run (Dan Carpenter kick), 6:32. Bills 24–17. **Drive: 11 plays, 54 yards, 5:15.**
- CLE – Josh Gordon 37-yard pass from Brandon Weeden (Billy Cundiff kick), 5:35. Tied 24–24. **Drive: 2 plays, 74 yards, 0:57.**

**Fourth quarter**

- CLE – Billy Cundiff 24-yard field goal, 12:31. Browns 27–24. **Drive: 10 plays, 26 yards, 4:32.**
- CLE – Billy Cundiff 44-yard field goal, 2:19. Browns 30–24. **Drive: 8 plays, 31 yards, 4:41.**
- CLE – T. J. Ward 44-yard interception return, 1:44. Browns 37–24.

**Top passers**

- BUF – EJ Manuel – 11/20, 129 yards
- CLE – Brandon Weeden – 13/24, 197 yards, TD

**Top rushers**

- BUF – C. J. Spiller – 8 rushes, 66 yards, TD
- CLE – Willis McGahee – 26 rushes, 72 yards, TD

**Top receivers**

- BUF – Robert Woods – 5 receptions, 64 yards
- CLE – Josh Gordon – 4 receptions, 86 yards, TD

EJ Manuel left the game for the Bills with a knee injury, and was replaced by Jeff Tuel. The Bills had a 24–17 lead in the third quarter, but the Browns, who also lost quarterback Brian Hoyer, won the game with Brandon Weeden at the helm. T. J. Ward returned an interception 44 yards to seal the game.

With the loss, the Bills fell to 2–3.

==== Week 6: vs. Cincinnati Bengals ====
Week Six: Cincinnati Bengals at Buffalo Bills – Game summary

Quarter	1	2	3	4	OT	Total
**Bengals**	10	7	7	0	3	**27**
Bills	7	3	0	14	0	**24**

at Ralph Wilson Stadium, Orchard Park, New York

- Date: October 13
- Game time: 1:00 p.m. EDT
- Game weather: 65 °F (18 °C), mostly cloudy
- Game attendance: 67,739
- Referee: Ed Hochuli
- TV announcers (CBS): Kevin Harlan, Solomon Wilcots and Boomer Esiason
- Recap, Game book

Game information

**First quarter**

- CIN – Mike Nugent 46-yard field goal, 12:14. Bengals 3–0. **Drive: 7 plays, 52 yards, 2:46.**
- BUF – Thad Lewis 3-yard run, 10:01. Bills 7–3. **Drive: 6 plays, 73 yards, 2:13.**
- CIN – A. J. Green 18-yard pass from Andy Dalton (Mike Nugent kick), 5:26. Bengals 10–7. **Drive: 8 plays, 83 yards, 4:35.**

**Second quarter**

- CIN – Giovani Bernard 20-yard pass from Andy Dalton (Mike Nugent kick), 8:34. Bengals 17–7. **Drive: 9 plays, 98 yards, 5:07.**
- BUF – Dan Carpenter 51-yard field goal, 4:14. Bengals 17–10. **Drive: 10 plays, 45 yards, 4:20.**

**Third quarter**

- CIN – Marvin Jones 10-yard pass from Andy Dalton (Mike Nugent kick), 10:49. Bengals 24–10. **Drive: 9 plays, 53 yards, 2:51.**

**Fourth quarter**

- BUF – Scott Chandler 22-yard pass from Thad Lewis (Dan Carpenter kick), 10:13. Bengals 24–17. **Drive: 8 plays, 45 yards, 2:33.**
- BUF – Marquise Goodwin 40-yard pass from Thad Lewis (Dan Carpenter kick), 1:08. Tied 24–24. **Drive: 7 plays, 86 yards, 1:32.**

**Overtime**

- CIN – Mike Nugent 43-yard field goal, 6:44. Bengals 27–24. **Drive: 4 plays, 8 yards, 2:04.**

**Top passers**

- CIN – Andy Dalton – 26/40, 337 yards, 3 TD, INT
- BUF – Thad Lewis – 19/32, 216 yards, 2 TD

**Top rushers**

- CIN – BenJarvus Green-Ellis – 18 rushes, 86 yards
- BUF – C. J. Spiller – 10 rushes, 55 yards

**Top receivers**

- CIN – A. J. Green – 6 receptions, 103 yards, TD
- BUF – T. J. Graham – 4 receptions, 74 yards

The Bills trailed 24–10 in the fourth quarter, but came back to tie the game after Marquise Goodwin caught a 40-yard touchdown pass from Thad Lewis and force overtime. In the extra period, the Bills got the ball first, but were forced to punt after they went three-and-out. The Bengals returned the punt 39 yards to set them up in field goal range. A couple of plays later, Mike Nugent kicked the game winning 43-yard field goal.

With the tough loss, the Bills fell to 2–4.

==== Week 7: at Miami Dolphins ====
Week Seven: Buffalo Bills at Miami Dolphins – Game summary

Quarter	1	2	3	4	Total
**Bills**	14	3	0	6	**23**
Dolphins	0	14	7	0	**21**

at Sun Life Stadium, Miami Gardens, Florida

- Date: October 20
- Game time: 1:00 p.m. EDT
- Game weather: 87 °F (31 °C), partly cloudy
- Game attendance: 60,592
- Referee: Gene Steratore
- TV announcers (CBS): Bill Macatee and Steve Tasker
- Recap, Game book

Game information

**First quarter**

- BUF – Nickell Robey 19-yard interception return (Dan Carpenter kick), 13:27. Bills 7–0.
- BUF – Fred Jackson 3-yard run (Dan Carpenter kick), 5:47. Bills 14–0. **Drive: 6 plays, 44 yards, 2:35.**

**Second quarter**

- MIA – Charles Clay 7-yard pass from Ryan Tannehill (Caleb Sturgis kick), 10:59. Bills 14–7. **Drive: 6 plays, 62 yards, 3:23.**
- BUF – Dan Carpenter 39-yard field goal, 3:14. Bills 17–7. **Drive: 8 plays, 38 yards, 2:36.**
- MIA – Brandon Gibson 13-yard pass from Ryan Tannehill (Caleb Sturgis kick), 0:21. Bills 17–14. **Drive: 5 plays, 75 yards, 1:04.**

**Third quarter**

- MIA – Brandon Gibson 4-yard pass from Ryan Tannehill (Caleb Sturgis kick), 6:46. Dolphins 21–17. **Drive: 11 plays, 66 yards, 6:43.**

**Fourth quarter**

- BUF – Dan Carpenter 20-yard field goal, 14:16. Dolphins 21–20. **Drive: 15 plays, 72 yards, 7:30.**
- BUF – Dan Carpenter 31-yard field goal, 0:33. Bills 23–21. **Drive: 7 plays, 21 yards, 2:15.**

**Top passers**

- BUF – Thad Lewis – 21/32, 202 yards, INT
- MIA – Ryan Tannehill – 19/37, 194 yards, 3 TD, 2 INT

**Top rushers**

- BUF – Fred Jackson – 11 rushes, 36 yards, TD
- MIA – Daniel Thomas – 12 rushes, 60 yards

**Top receivers**

- BUF – Stevie Johnson – 6 receptions, 61 yards
- MIA – Brian Hartline – 6 receptions, 69 yards

With the win, the Bills improved to 3–4.

==== Week 8: at New Orleans Saints ====
Week Eight: Buffalo Bills at New Orleans Saints – Game summary

Quarter	1	2	3	4	Total
Bills	0	10	0	7	**17**
**Saints**	7	14	7	7	**35**

at Mercedes-Benz Superdome, New Orleans, Louisiana

- Date: October 27
- Game time: 1:00 p.m. EDT/12:00 p.m. CDT
- Game weather: Played indoors (dome stadium)
- Game attendance: 72,405
- Referee: Terry McAulay
- TV announcers (CBS): Greg Gumbel and Dan Dierdorf
- Recap, Game book

Game information

**First quarter**

- NO – Lance Moore 15-yard pass from Drew Brees (Garrett Hartley kick), 4:44. Saints 7–0. **Drive: 3 plays, 21 yards, 1:21.**

**Second quarter**

- BUF – Stevie Johnson 13-yard pass from Thad Lewis (Dan Carpenter kick), 10:44. Tied 7–7. **Drive: 8 plays, 72 yards, 4:07.**
- BUF – Dan Carpenter 37-yard field goal, 4:35. Bills 10–7. **Drive: 9 plays, 43 yards, 3:58.**
- NO – Kenny Stills 69-yard pass from Drew Brees (Garrett Hartley kick), 3:43. Saints 14–10. **Drive: 2 plays, 86 yards, 0:52.**
- NO – Jimmy Graham 15-yard pass from Drew Brees (Garrett Hartley kick), 0:30. Saints 21–10. **Drive: 9 plays, 77 yards, 2:48.**

**Third quarter**

- NO – Jimmy Graham 13-yard pass from Drew Brees (Garrett Hartley kick), 5:15. Saints 28–10. **Drive: 6 plays, 57 yards, 3:25.**

**Fourth quarter**

- BUF – Fred Jackson 1-yard run (Dan Carpenter kick), 14:20. Saints 28–17. **Drive: 12 plays, 80 yards, 5:55.**
- NO – Kenny Stills 42-yard pass from Drew Brees (Garrett Hartley kick), 7:34. Saints 35–17. **Drive: 6 plays, 51 yards, 2:58.**

**Top passers**

- BUF – Thad Lewis – 22/39, 234 yards, TD, INT
- NO – Drew Brees – 26/34, 332 yards, 5 TD

**Top rushers**

- BUF – Fred Jackson – 15 rushes, 45 yards, TD
- NO – Pierre Thomas – 14 rushes, 65 yards

**Top receivers**

- BUF – Stevie Johnson – 7 receptions, 72 yards, TD
- NO – Kenny Stills – 3 receptions, 129 yards, 2 TD

This marked the Bills' only game outside of the Eastern time zone during the 2013 season.

==== Week 9: vs. Kansas City Chiefs ====
Week Nine: Kansas City Chiefs at Buffalo Bills – Game summary

Quarter	1	2	3	4	Total
**Chiefs**	0	3	10	10	**23**
Bills	7	3	3	0	**13**

at Ralph Wilson Stadium, Orchard Park, New York

- Date: November 3
- Game time: 1:00 p.m. EST
- Game weather: 36 °F (2 °C), overcast
- Game attendance: 68,159
- Referee: Ron Winter
- TV announcers (CBS): Greg Gumbel and Danny Amendola
- Recap, Game book

Game information

**First quarter**

- BUF – Marquise Goodwin 59-yard pass from Jeff Tuel (Dan Carpenter kick), 1:52. Bills 7–0. **Drive: 6 plays, 88 yards, 2:10.**

**Second quarter**

- KC – Ryan Succop 27-yard field goal, 7:30. Bills 7–3. **Drive: 10 plays, 32 yards, 4:19.**
- BUF – Dan Carpenter 26-yard field goal, 1:47. Bills 10–3. **Drive: 14 plays, 71 yards, 5:43.**

**Third quarter**

- KC – Sean Smith 100-yard interception return (Ryan Succop kick), 10:58. Tied 10–10.
- KC – Ryan Succop 41-yard field goal, 3:57. Chiefs 13–10. **Drive: 7 plays, 42 yards, 2:46.**
- BUF – Dan Carpenter 30-yard field goal, 0:20. Tied 13–13. **Drive: 12 plays, 68 yards, 3:37.**

**Fourth quarter**

- KC – Tamba Hali 11-yard fumble return (Ryan Succop kick), 12:47. Chiefs 20–13.
- KC – Ryan Succop 39-yard field goal, 2:13. Chiefs 23–13. **Drive: 7 plays, 32 yards, 4:16.**

**Top passers**

- KC – Alex Smith – 19/29, 124 yards
- BUF – Jeff Tuel – 18/39, 229 yards, TD, 2 INT

**Top rushers**

- KC – Jamaal Charles – 17 rushes, 90 yards
- BUF – C. J. Spiller – 12 rushes, 116 yards

**Top receivers**

- KC – Dwayne Bowe – 7 receptions, 67 yards
- BUF – Marquise Goodwin – 2 receptions, 64 yards, TD

Despite Buffalo's defense not allowing a touchdown, the offense gave up two turnover returns for touchdowns in the second half. With the loss, the Bills fell to 3–6.

==== Week 10: at Pittsburgh Steelers ====
Week Ten: Buffalo Bills at Pittsburgh Steelers – Game summary

Quarter	1	2	3	4	Total
Bills	3	0	0	7	**10**
**Steelers**	0	10	7	6	**23**

at Heinz Field, Pittsburgh, Pennsylvania

- Date: November 10
- Game time: 1:00 p.m. EST
- Game weather: 46 °F (8 °C), mostly cloudy
- Game attendance: 60,406
- Referee: Scott Green
- TV announcers (CBS): Marv Albert and Rich Gannon
- Recap, Game book

Game information

**First quarter**

- BUF – Dan Carpenter 20-yard field goal, 6:16. Bills 3–0. **Drive: 9 plays, 28 yards, 3:59.**

**Second quarter**

- PIT – Shaun Suisham 36-yard field goal, 8:47. Tied 3–3. **Drive: 13 plays, 58 yards, 6:46.**
- PIT – Jerricho Cotchery 5-yard pass from Ben Roethlisberger (Shaun Suisham kick), 1:55. Steelers 10–3. **Drive: 9 plays, 86 yards, 4:48.**

**Third quarter**

- PIT – Le'Veon Bell 4-yard run (Shaun Suisham kick), 3:02. Steelers 17–3. **Drive: 6 plays, 58 yards, 3:03.**

**Fourth quarter**

- PIT – Shaun Suisham 37-yard field goal, 8:00. Steelers 20–3. **Drive: 4 plays, -5 yards, 1:31.**
- PIT – Shaun Suisham 23-yard field goal, 4:34. Steelers 23–3. **Drive: 4 plays, 6 yards, 1:36.**
- BUF – Chris Gragg 2-yard pass from EJ Manuel (Dan Carpenter kick), 0:03. Steelers 23–10. **Drive: 15 plays, 80 yards, 4:31.**

**Top passers**

- BUF – EJ Manuel – 22/39, 155 yards, TD, INT
- PIT – Ben Roethlisberger – 18/30, 204 yards, TD, INT

**Top rushers**

- BUF – Fred Jackson – 12 rushes, 55 yards
- PIT – Le'Veon Bell – 22 rushes, 57 yards, TD

**Top receivers**

- BUF – Stevie Johnson – 3 receptions, 48 yards
- PIT – Antonio Brown – 6 receptions, 104 yards

With the loss, the Bills fell to 3–7 and they finished 1-3 against the AFC North.

==== Week 11: vs. New York Jets ====
Week Eleven: New York Jets at Buffalo Bills – Game summary

Quarter	1	2	3	4	Total
Jets	0	0	7	7	**14**
**Bills**	0	20	14	3	**37**

at Ralph Wilson Stadium, Orchard Park, New York

- Date: November 17
- Game time: 1:00 p.m. EST
- Game weather: 62 °F (17 °C), cloudy
- Game attendance: 68,036
- Referee: Bill Leavy
- TV announcers (CBS): Ian Eagle and Dan Fouts
- Recap, Game book

Game information

**First quarter**

- No scoring plays.

**Second quarter**

- BUF – Dan Carpenter 40-yard field goal, 12:40. Bills 3–0. **Drive: 10 plays, 36 yards, 3:40.**
- BUF – T. J. Graham 34-yard pass from EJ Manuel (Dan Carpenter kick), 4:05. Bills 10–0. **Drive: 13 plays, 68 yards, 7:02.**
- BUF – Frank Summers 3-yard run (Dan Carpenter kick), 3:17. Bills 17–0. **Drive: 2 plays, 4 yards, 0:36.**
- BUF – Dan Carpenter 42-yard field goal, 1:15. Bills 20–0. **Drive: 4 plays, 3 yards, 1:11.**

**Third quarter**

- NYJ – Chris Ivory 1-yard run (Nick Folk kick), 7:18. Bills 20–7. **Drive: 7 plays, 40 yards, 2:25.**
- BUF – Marquise Goodwin 43-yard pass from EJ Manuel (Dan Carpenter kick), 4:40. Bills 27–7. **Drive: 2 plays, 83 yards, 0:27.**
- BUF – Da'Norris Searcy 32-yard interception return (Dan Carpenter kick), 1:14. Bills 34–7.

**Fourth quarter**

- NYJ – Jeff Cumberland 13-yard pass from Matt Simms (Nick Folk kick), 9:36. Bills 34–14. **Drive: 6 plays, 72 yards, 3:19.**
- BUF – Dan Carpenter 43-yard field goal, 4:02. Bills 37–14. **Drive: 9 plays, 56 yards, 5:54.**

**Top passers**

- NYJ – Geno Smith – 8/23, 103 yards, 3 INT
- BUF – EJ Manuel – 20/28, 245 yards, 2 TD

**Top rushers**

- NYJ – Chris Ivory – 15 rushes, 98 yards, TD
- BUF – Fred Jackson – 12 rushes, 34 yards

**Top receivers**

- NYJ – Santonio Holmes – 2 receptions, 71 yards
- BUF – Marquise Goodwin – 6 receptions, 81 yards, TD

With the win, the Bills improved to 4–7.

==== Week 13: vs. Atlanta Falcons ====
Bills Toronto Series

Week Thirteen: Atlanta Falcons at Buffalo Bills – Game summary

Quarter	1	2	3	4	OT	Total
**Falcons**	7	10	7	7	3	**34**
Bills	14	3	7	7	0	**31**

at Rogers Centre, Toronto, Ontario, Canada

- Date: December 1
- Game time: 4:05 p.m. EST
- Game weather: Played indoors (retractable roof closed)
- Game attendance: 38,969
- Referee: Walt Anderson
- TV announcers (Fox): Dick Stockton, Ronde Barber and Kris Budden
- Recap, Game book

Game information

**First quarter**

- BUF – EJ Manuel 1-yard run (Dan Carpenter kick), 10:54. Bills 7–0. **Drive: 4 plays, 85 yards, 1:56.**
- BUF – Fred Jackson 4-yard run (Dan Carpenter kick), 5:00. Bills 14–0. **Drive: 9 plays, 63 yards, 3:56.**
- ATL – Steven Jackson 27-yard run (Matt Bryant kick), 2:30. Bills 14–7. **Drive: 5 plays, 81 yards, 2:30.**

**Second quarter**

- BUF – Dan Carpenter 29-yard field goal, 7:24. Bills 17–7. **Drive: 15 plays, 56 yards, 5:25.**
- ATL – Antone Smith 38-yard run (Matt Bryant kick), 4:49. Bills 17–14. **Drive: 6 plays, 71 yards, 2:35.**
- ATL – Matt Bryant 49-yard field goal, 0:00. Tied 17–17. **Drive: 9 plays, 36 yards, 2:49.**

**Third quarter**

- ATL – Tony Gonzalez 11-yard pass from Matt Ryan (Matt Bryant kick), 8:13. Falcons 24–17. **Drive: 10 plays, 55 yards, 5:30.**
- BUF – Fred Jackson 21-yard pass from EJ Manuel (Dan Carpenter kick), 6:01. Tied 24–24. **Drive: 1 play, 21 yards, 0:09.**

**Fourth quarter**

- BUF – C. J. Spiller 36-yard run (Dan Carpenter kick), 11:48. Bills 31–24. **Drive: 3 plays, 87 yards, 1:03.**
- ATL – Steven Jackson 1-yard run (Matt Bryant kick), 1:28. Tied 31–31. **Drive: 11 plays, 65 yards, 2:58.**

**Overtime**

- ATL – Matt Bryant 36-yard field goal, 12:00. Falcons 34–31. **Drive: 5 plays, 30 yards, 2:16.**

**Top passers**

- ATL – Matt Ryan – 28/47, 311 yards, TD
- BUF – EJ Manuel – 18/32, 210 yards, TD

**Top rushers**

- ATL – Steven Jackson – 23 rushes, 84 yards, 2 TD
- BUF – C. J. Spiller – 15 rushes, 149 yards, TD

**Top receivers**

- ATL – Roddy White – 10 receptions, 143 yards
- BUF – Scott Chandler – 4 receptions, 63 yards

With the loss, the Bills fell to 4–8.

==== Week 14: at Tampa Bay Buccaneers ====
Week Fourteen: Buffalo Bills at Tampa Bay Buccaneers – Game summary

Quarter	1	2	3	4	Total
Bills	3	0	3	0	**6**
**Buccaneers**	14	10	3	0	**27**

at Raymond James Stadium, Tampa, Florida

- Date: December 8
- Game time: 1:00 p.m. EST
- Game weather: 82 °F (28 °C), cloudy
- Game attendance: 59,194
- Referee: Bill Vinovich
- TV announcers (CBS): Spero Dedes and Steve Beuerlein
- Recap, Game book

Game information

**First quarter**

- TB – Bobby Rainey 80-yard run (Rian Lindell kick), 14:42. Buccaneers 7–0. **Drive: 2 plays, 80 yards, 0:18.**
- BUF – Dan Carpenter 40-yard field goal, 8:07. Buccaneers 7–3. **Drive: 7 plays, 36 yards, 2:29.**
- TB – Vincent Jackson 38-yard pass from Mike Glennon (Rian Lindell kick), 2:34. Buccaneers 14–3. **Drive: 9 plays, 80 yards, 5:33.**

**Second quarter**

- TB – Rian Lindell 53-yard field goal, 10:45. Buccaneers 17–3. **Drive: 4 plays, 6 yards, 1:32.**
- TB – Tim Wright 5-yard pass from Mike Glennon (Rian Lindell kick), 0:15. Buccaneers 24–3. **Drive: 10 plays, 57 yards, 4:31.**

**Third quarter**

- BUF – Dan Carpenter 46-yard field goal, 10:19. Buccaneers 24–6. **Drive: 9 plays, 52 yards, 4:41.**
- TB – Rian Lindell 32-yard field goal, 0:07. Buccaneers 27–6. **Drive: 4 plays, −2 yards, 0:54.**

**Fourth quarter**

- No scoring plays.

**Top passers**

- BUF – EJ Manuel – 18/33, 184 yards, 4 INT
- TB – Mike Glennon – 9/25, 90 yards, 2 TD, 2 INT

**Top rushers**

- BUF – EJ Manuel – 5 rushes, 29 yards
- TB – Bobby Rainey – 22 rushes, 127 yards, TD

**Top receivers**

- BUF – Stevie Johnson – 5 receptions, 67 yards
- TB – Vincent Jackson – 3 receptions, 70 yards, TD

With the loss, the Bills fell to 4–9 and they finished 1-3 against the NFC South.

==== Week 15: at Jacksonville Jaguars ====
Week Fifteen: Buffalo Bills at Jacksonville Jaguars – Game summary

Quarter	1	2	3	4	Total
**Bills**	3	17	0	7	**27**
Jaguars	3	7	3	7	**20**

at EverBank Field, Jacksonville, Florida

- Date: December 15
- Game time: 1:00 p.m. EST
- Game weather: 60 °F (16 °C), 10% chance of rain
- Game attendance: 60,085
- Referee: Ron Winter
- TV announcers (CBS): Andrew Catalon and Rich Gannon
- Recap, Game book

Game information

**First quarter**

- BUF – Dan Carpenter 42-yard field goal, 13:10. Bills 3–0. **Drive: 4 plays, 1 yard, 0:48.**
- JAX – Josh Scobee 32-yard field goal, 8:07. Tied 3–3. **Drive: 6 plays, 19 yards, 1:48.**

**Second quarter**

- JAX – Ace Sanders 12-yard pass from Chad Henne (Josh Scobee kick), 14:54. Jaguars 10–3. **Drive: 10 plays, 56 yards, 3:33.**
- BUF – Robert Woods 7-yard pass from EJ Manuel (Dan Carpenter kick), 7:07. Tied 10–10. **Drive: 9 plays, 94 yards, 4:05.**
- BUF – EJ Manuel 8-yard run (Dan Carpenter kick), 2:14. Bills 17–10. **Drive: 8 plays, 72 yards, 3:27.**
- BUF – Dan Carpenter 40-yard field goal, 0:00. Bills 20–10. **Drive: 3 plays, 39 yards, 0:26.**

**Third quarter**

- JAX – Josh Scobee 55-yard field goal, 4:43. Bills 20–13. **Drive: 6 plays, 39 yards, 2:05.**

**Fourth quarter**

- JAX – Marcedes Lewis 13-yard pass from Chad Henne (Josh Scobee kick), 13:50. Tied 20–20. **Drive: 7 plays, 55 yards, 2:05.**
- BUF – Frank Summers 1-yard pass from EJ Manuel (Dan Carpenter kick), 9:35. Bills 27–20. **Drive: 9 plays, 80 yards, 4:15.**

**Top passers**

- BUF – EJ Manuel – 17/24, 193 yards, 2 TD, INT
- JAX – Chad Henne – 21/36, 237 yards, 2 TD, 2 INT

**Top rushers**

- BUF – Fred Jackson – 17 rushes, 80 yards
- JAX – Jordan Todman – 25 rushes, 109 yards

**Top receivers**

- BUF – Robert Woods – 5 receptions, 82 yards, TD
- JAX – Marcedes Lewis – 4 receptions, 54 yards, TD

With the win, the Bills improved to 5–9, but were eliminated from playoff contention with the Miami Dolphins' win over the New England Patriots.

==== Week 16: vs. Miami Dolphins ====
Week Sixteen: Miami Dolphins at Buffalo Bills – Game summary

Quarter	1	2	3	4	Total
Dolphins	0	0	0	0	**0**
**Bills**	3	7	0	9	**19**

at Ralph Wilson Stadium, Orchard Park, New York

- Date: December 22
- Game time: 1:00 p.m. EST
- Game weather: 41 °F (5 °C), cloudy with mist
- Game attendance: 54,305
- Referee: Clete Blakeman
- TV announcers (CBS): Spero Dedes and Steve Beuerlein (blacked out locally)
- Recap, Game book

Game information

**First quarter**

- BUF – Dan Carpenter 45-yard field goal, 6:42. Bills 3–0. **Drive: 6 plays, 68 yards, 1:46.**

**Second quarter**

- BUF – Fred Jackson 9-yard run (Dan Carpenter kick), 13:18. Bills 10–0. **Drive: 9 plays, 57 yards, 4:47.**

**Third quarter**

- No scoring plays.

**Fourth quarter**

- BUF – Dan Carpenter 21-yard field goal, 12:01. Bills 13–0. **Drive: 19 plays, 92 yards, 9:16.**
- BUF – Dan Carpenter 22-yard field goal, 6:43. Bills 16–0. **Drive: 7 plays, 44 yards, 3:48.**
- BUF – Dan Carpenter 26-yard field goal, 2:26. Bills 19–0. **Drive: 4 plays, 9 yards, 2:18.**

**Top passers**

- MIA – Ryan Tannehill – 10/27, 82 yards
- BUF – EJ Manuel – 15/25, 193 yards, INT

**Top rushers**

- MIA – Lamar Miller – 3 rushes, 8 yards
- BUF – Fred Jackson – 18 rushes, 105 yards, TD

**Top receivers**

- MIA – Brian Hartline – 2 receptions, 53 yards
- BUF – Robert Woods – 3 receptions, 70 yards

With the win, the Bills improved to 6–9. This was also the last home game that the Bills didn't sell out. Since the next game (Week 2 of the 2014 season against the Dolphins), every Bills home game has been sold out.

==== Week 17: at New England Patriots ====
Week Seventeen: Buffalo Bills at New England Patriots – Game summary

Quarter	1	2	3	4	Total
Bills	3	0	7	10	**20**
**Patriots**	6	10	0	18	**34**

at Gillette Stadium, Foxborough, Massachusetts

- Date: December 29
- Game time: 4:25 p.m. EST
- Game weather: 39 °F (4 °C), rain
- Game attendance: 68,756
- Referee: Ed Hochuli
- TV announcers (CBS): Ian Eagle and Dan Fouts
- Recap, Game book

Game information

**First quarter**

- NE – Stephen Gostkowski 43-yard field goal, 9:41. Patriots 3–0. **Drive: 13 plays, 52 yards, 5:19.**
- BUF – Dan Carpenter 51-yard field goal, 6:14. Tied 3–3. **Drive: 9 plays, 37 yards, 3:27.**
- BUF – Stephen Gostkowski 35-yard field goal, 2:41. Patriots 6–3. **Drive: 9 plays, 59 yards, 3:33.**

**Second quarter**

- NE – LeGarrette Blount 36-yard run (Stephen Gostkowski kick), 12:14. Patriots 13–3. **Drive: 7 plays, 94 yards, 2:49.**
- NE – Stephen Gostkowski 29-yard field goal, 0:00. Patriots 16–3. **Drive: 12 plays, 65 yards, 4:43.**

**Third quarter**

- BUF – T. J. Graham 12-yard pass from Thaddeus Lewis (Dan Carpenter kick), 1:29. Patriots 16–10. **Drive: 7 plays, 80 yards, 2:50.**

**Fourth quarter**

- NE – Shane Vereen 5-yard pass from Tom Brady (Tom Brady-Julian Edelman pass), 14:56. Patriots 24–10. **Drive: 4 plays, 20 yards, 1:33.**
- BUF – Fred Jackson 5-yard run (Dan Carpenter kick), 10:20. Patriots 24–17. **Drive: 10 plays, 80 yards, 4:36.**
- NE – Stephen Gostkowski 35-yard field goal, 7:57. Patriots 27–17. **Drive: 5 plays, 23 yards, 2:23.**
- BUF – Dan Carpenter 37-yard field goal, 3:26. Patriots 27–20. **Drive: 7 plays, 33 yards, 1:33.**
- NE – LeGarrette Blount 35-yard run (Stephen Gostkowski kick), 2:31. Patriots 34–20. **Drive: 2 plays, 45 yards, 0:55.**

**Top passers**

- BUF – Thaddeus Lewis – 16/29, 247 yards, TD
- NE – Tom Brady – 14/24, 122 yards, TD, INT

**Top rushers**

- BUF – C. J. Spiller – 19 rushes, 105 yards
- NE – LeGarrette Blount – 24 rushes, 189 yards, 2 TD

**Top receivers**

- BUF – T. J. Graham – 3 receptions, 62 yards, TD
- NE – Julian Edelman – 9 receptions, 65 yards

With the loss, the Bills ended their season at 6–10.

== Standings ==
=== Division ===
AFC East
	W	L	T	PCT	DIV	CONF	PF	PA	STK
^{(2)} New England Patriots	12	4	0	.750	4–2	9–3	444	338	W2
New York Jets	8	8	0	.500	3–3	5–7	290	387	W2
Miami Dolphins	8	8	0	.500	2–4	7–5	317	335	L2
Buffalo Bills	6	10	0	.375	3–3	5–7	339	388	L1

=== Conference ===
AFC
#	Team	Division	W	L	T	PCT	DIV	CONF	SOS	SOV	STK
Division winners
1	Denver Broncos	West	13	3	0	.813	5–1	9–3	.469	.423	W2
2	New England Patriots	East	12	4	0	.750	4–2	9–3	.473	.427	W2
3 (Note: Cincinnati defeated Indianapolis head-to-head (Week 14, 42–28).)	Cincinnati Bengals	North	11	5	0	.688	3–3	8–4	.480	.494	W2
4	Indianapolis Colts	South	11	5	0	.688	6–0	9–3	.484	.449	W3
Wild cards
5	Kansas City Chiefs	West	11	5	0	.688	2–4	7–5	.445	.335	L2
6	San Diego Chargers	West	9	7	0	.563	4–2	6–6	.496	.549	W4
Did not qualify for the postseason
7 (Note: Pittsburgh finished with a better division record than Baltimore.) (Note: Pittsburgh defeated the New York Jets head-to-head (Week 6, 19–6).)	Pittsburgh Steelers	North	8	8	0	.500	4–2	6–6	.469	.441	W3
8 (Note: Baltimore defeated the New York Jets head-to-head (Week 12, 19–3).)	Baltimore Ravens	North	8	8	0	.500	3–3	6–6	.484	.418	L2
9 (Note: The New York Jets finished with a better division record than Miami.)	New York Jets	East	8	8	0	.500	3–3	5–7	.488	.414	W2
10	Miami Dolphins	East	8	8	0	.500	2–4	7–5	.523	.523	L2
11	Tennessee Titans	South	7	9	0	.438	2–4	6–6	.504	.375	W2
12	Buffalo Bills	East	6	10	0	.375	3–3	5–7	.520	.500	L1
13 (Note: Oakland and Jacksonville finished with a better conference record than Cleveland.) (Note: Oakland defeated Jacksonville head-to-head (Week 2, 19–9).)	Oakland Raiders	West	4	12	0	.250	1–5	4–8	.523	.359	L6
14 (Note: Jacksonville defeated Cleveland head-to-head (Week 13, 32–28).)	Jacksonville Jaguars	South	4	12	0	.250	3–3	4–8	.504	.234	L3
15	Cleveland Browns	North	4	12	0	.250	2–4	3–9	.516	.477	L7
16	Houston Texans	South	2	14	0	.125	1–5	2–10	.559	.500	L14
Tiebreakers (Note: When breaking ties for three or more teams under the NFL's rules, they are first broken within divisions, then comparing only the highest ranked remaining team from each division.)
