= Devante =

Devante, DeVante or De'Vante is a given name. Notable people with the given name include:

- Davante Adams (born 1992), American football player
- De'Vante Bausby (born 1993), American football player
- Devante Bond (born 1993), American football player
- Devante Clut (born 1995), Australian football player
- Devante Cole (born 1995), English footballer
- Devante Davis (born 1992), American football player
- Devante Downs (born 1995), American football player
- De'Vante Harris (born 1993), American football player
- Devante Mays (born 1994), American football player
- DeVante McCreary (born 1998), American rapper known professionally as BossMan Dlow
- Devante McKain (born 1994), English footballer
- DeVante Parker (born 1993), American football player
- Devante Parker (born 1996), German footballer
- Devante Smith-Pelly (born 1992), Canadian ice hockey player
- DeVante Swing (born 1969), American musician

== See also ==
- Devonte, given name
- Davonte, given name
