= Jeff Tuel =

American football player (born 1991)

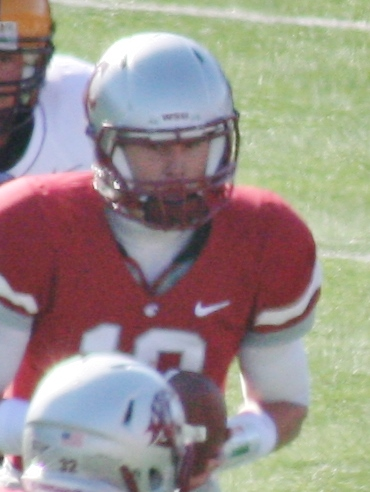
- Tuel with Washington State in 2009

No. 8
- Position: Quarterback

Personal information
- Born: February 12, 1991 (age 35); Boca Raton, Florida, U.S.
- Listed height: 6 ft 3 in (1.91 m)
- Listed weight: 218 lb (99 kg)

Career information
- High school: Clovis West (Fresno, California)
- College: Washington State (2009–2012)
- NFL draft: 2013: undrafted

Career history
- Buffalo Bills (2013–2014); Jacksonville Jaguars (2015)*
- * Offseason or practice squad member only

Career NFL statistics
- Passing attempts: 59
- Passing completions: 26
- Completion percentage: 44.1%
- TD–INT: 1–3
- Passing yards: 309
- Passer rating: 45.1
- Stats at Pro Football Reference

Jeffrey Victor Tuel (born February 12, 1991) is an American former professional football player who was a quarterback in the National Football League (NFL). He played college football for the Washington State Cougars. He was signed by the Buffalo Bills as an undrafted free agent in 2013 and spent most of 2013 and 2014 as the Bills' third-string quarterback. He was also a member of the Jacksonville Jaguars.

As of June 2019 he was the vice president of sales for Fresno-based agriculture company Greenbrier Holdings, which at the time had just broken ground on a 20,000-square-foot operating plant for its burgeoning cannabis business.

== Early life ==
Tuel's family moved from Tucson, Arizona, to Fresno, California, after his freshman year of high school. Wanting to play quarterback, he chose to attend Clovis West High School in Fresno due to its reputation, even though Beau Sweeney was entrenched as Clovis West's starting quarterback. Tuel played for the junior varsity team in his sophomore year, then made the varsity team as a wide receiver in his junior year. He became the starting quarterback in his senior year.

== College career ==
Tuel enrolled at Washington State University, becoming only the second true freshman to start at quarterback for the Washington State Cougars football team, after Drew Bledsoe (who, coincidentally, also wound up playing for the Bills). In 26 games, Tuel had four wins. However, his 61.4 completion percentage is the highest in Cougars' history, and he finished his career in the top ten in school history for completions, pass attempts, touchdowns, and passing yards.

In his final game at Washington State, at home against rival Washington in the annual Apple Cup in November 2012, Tuel led the Cougars to the largest comeback victory in the 105 games the schools had played up to that point. WSU trailed by 18 in the fourth quarter and won the game 31-28 in overtime. Tuel completed 33 of 53 passes for 350 yards.

Tuel suffered a broken collarbone early in the 2011 season, and reinjured his collarbone when he returned. He considered petitioning the National Collegiate Athletic Association (NCAA) for a fifth year of collegiate eligibility due to injuries that limited his playing time, but decided against it. He believed that the NCAA wanted him to blame head coach Paul Wulff's handling of the injury.

== Professional career ==
=== Buffalo Bills ===
Tuel was not invited to the NFL Scouting Combine or selected in the 2013 NFL draft. Tuel signed with the Buffalo Bills.

On August 26, 2013, Tuel was tentatively named the starting quarterback for Week 1 of the 2013 season. Whether Tuel would start depended on the status of current first-string quarterback EJ Manuel (drafted in the first round of the 2013 draft), who was recovering from an operation on his knee. On September 4, the Bills determined Manuel was healthy enough to return to play and named him starting quarterback, relegating Tuel to the second string position.

Had Tuel started that game, he would have been the first undrafted rookie quarterback to start a season opener without any prior professional football experience since at least the 1950s. He received some notoriety for being a relatively unknown player when he was named as the Bills' starting quarterback—in fact, this Wikipedia page did not exist when the announcement happened.

Tuel played his first NFL game on October 3, 2013, against the Cleveland Browns shortly after Manuel hurt his knee halfway into the 3rd quarter. Tuel's first pass was incomplete, due to a defensive interference. Late in the 4th quarter, Tuel threw an interception that was returned 44 yards for a touchdown, effectively ending any chance of a Bills comeback. Following Tuel's performance, the Bills called up Thad Lewis from the practice squad and named him starter, again demoting Tuel to second-string. Coincidentally, the Bills also brought back punter Brian Moorman, who wore Tuel's original number 8 in the twelve seasons before Tuel's arrival; Tuel gave Moorman his number 8 and changed to number 7.

Tuel made his first NFL start on November 3, 2013, a 23–13 loss to the Kansas City Chiefs.

Tuel and Lewis competed for the second string position during the 2014 preseason and training camp; Tuel won the competition, and Lewis was released on August 26. The move was short-lived; the team released all of its backup quarterbacks, including Tuel, in final preseason cuts on August 30, leaving only Manuel on the roster (the team then signed Kyle Orton, who came out of a brief retirement, to serve as Manuel's only backup). Tuel was signed to the Bills' practice squad shortly afterward. Tuel was waived by the Bills on May 29, 2015.

=== Jacksonville Jaguars ===
Tuel was claimed off waivers by the Jacksonville Jaguars on June 1, 2015. He was waived on August 29, 2015. On October 13, Tuel was re-signed to Jacksonville's practice squad. On December 9, 2015, Tuel was released from the Jaguars' practice squad.

== Career statistics ==
=== NFL ===
Year	Team	Games		Passing								Rushing				
Year	Team	GP	GS	Record	Cmp	Att	Pct	Yds	Avg	TD	Int	Rtg	Att	Yds	Avg	TD
2013	BUF	2	1	0–1	26	59	44.1	309	5.2	1	3	45.1	3	17	5.7	0
Total		2	1	0–1	26	59	44.1	309	5.2	1	3	45.1	3	17	5.7	0

=== College ===
Season	Games		Passing							Rushing	
Season	Cmp	Att	Yds	Pct	TD	Int	Rtg	Att	Yds	Avg	TD
2009	71	121	789	58.7	6	5	121.6	55	-28	-0.4	0
2010	219	366	2,780	59.8	18	12	133.3	135	199	1.5	1
2011	29	45	276	63.6	1	0	123.3	17	-9	-0.5	1
2012	211	332	2,087	63.6	8	8	119.5	55	-115	-2.0	0
Career	530	864	5,932	61.3	33	25	124.4	262	47	0.2	2
