= Marquise Goodwin =

American football player (born 1990)

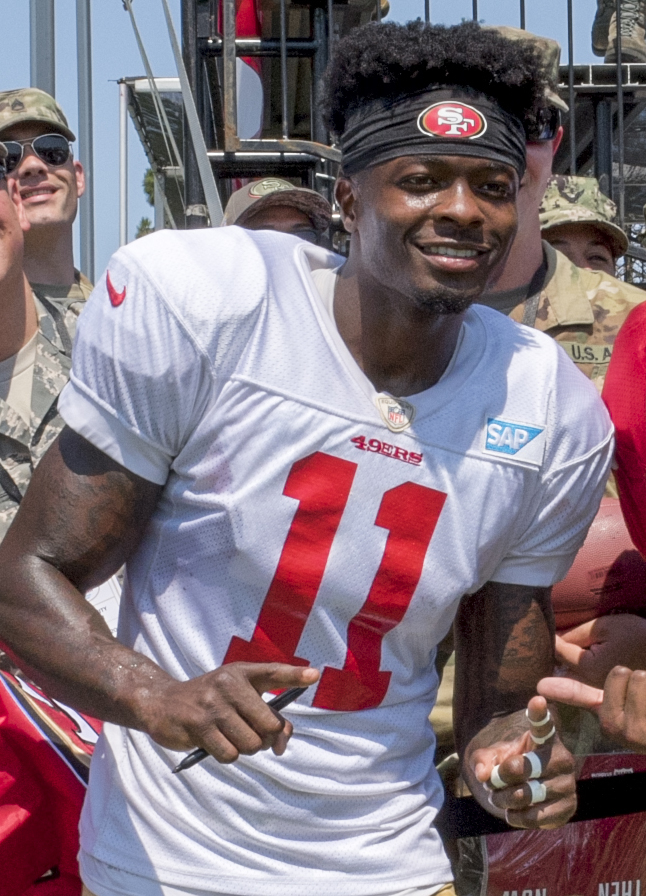
- Goodwin with the San Francisco 49ers in 2018

No. 88, 11, 84, 15, 3
- Position: Wide receiver

Personal information
- Born: November 19, 1990 (age 36); Lubbock, Texas, U.S.
- Listed height: 5 ft 9 in (1.75 m)
- Listed weight: 185 lb (84 kg)

Career information
- High school: Rowlett (Rowlett, Texas)
- College: Texas (2009–2012)
- NFL draft: 2013: 3rd round, 78th overall pick

Career history
- Buffalo Bills (2013–2016); San Francisco 49ers (2017–2019); Philadelphia Eagles (2020); San Francisco 49ers (2021)*; Chicago Bears (2021); Seattle Seahawks (2022); Cleveland Browns (2023)
- * Offseason or practice squad member only

Awards and highlights
- George Halas Award (2018)

Career NFL statistics
- Receptions: 191
- Receiving yards: 3,090
- Receiving touchdowns: 18
- Stats at Pro Football Reference

Marquise Derell Goodwin Sr. (born November 19, 1990) is an American former professional football player who was a wide receiver in the National Football League (NFL). He also is an Olympian who competed in the long jump in track and field. He was selected by the Buffalo Bills in the third round of the 2013 NFL draft. He played college football for the Texas Longhorns.

In track and field, his specialty was the long jump, an event in which he won two national college championships. Goodwin represented the United States at the 2008 IAAF World Junior Championships, the 2011 World University Games, the 2011 IAAF World Championships, the 2012 Summer Olympics, and the 2015 Pan American Games, where he won silver. In addition to the long jump, he was a sprinter and triple jumper who competed in the 60 meters and 100 meters dashes.

== Early life ==
Goodwin was born in Lubbock, Texas. He attended Rowlett High School in Rowlett, Texas, and played high school football and competed in track and field for the Rowlett Eagles. He had the second fastest 100-meter time (10.24w) in the state, was the state champion in the triple jump and long jump, and was a member of the state title-winning 4 × 100-meter relay team. He won seven Texas Class 5A state track and field championships while he was at Rowlett. He also finished first in the long jump at the 2008 World Junior Championships in Athletics in Bydgoszcz, Poland, and first again at the 2008 and 2009 United States Junior Championships. At the 2009 USA Outdoor Track and Field Championships, Goodwin set the national high school record in the long jump and placed fifth (8.18 meters; 26 feet 10 inches).

In his high school career, he caught 132 passes for 1,709 yards (12.95 average) and 17 touchdowns.

== College career ==
Goodwin received an athletic scholarship to attend the University of Texas at Austin, where he pledged Kappa Alpha Psi fraternity. He played for coach Mack Brown's Texas Longhorns football team from 2009 to 2012, and also competed for the Texas Longhorns track and field team from 2010 to 2012.

=== College track and field ===
Goodwin was a two-time NCAA champion in the long jump (2010, 2012) and a four-time All-American in track and field. He won five Big 12 Conference championships and made the All-Big 12 team seven times. He is the Longhorns' indoor record holder in the long jump and was the runner-up for the 2012 NCAA Indoor long jump title.

He won the 2011 U.S. Outdoor Track and Field long jump title with a personal-best 27 feet 4 inches (8.33 meters) and won the 2012 Outdoor Championship/Olympic Trials with the same distance. He competed in the 2012 Olympics, ranking tied for the #1 qualifier, but only managed 10th place in the final.

He chose not to compete in the 2013 NCAA track and field seasons in indoor or outdoor.

=== College football ===
In his collegiate career, Goodwin started 21 of the 49 games in which he appeared, including the 2010 BCS National Championship Game against Alabama. His final career statistics included 116 receptions for 1,296 yards and six touchdowns, rushed 46 times for 405 yards and 44 kickoff returns for 985 yards and one touchdown. He also returned a punt for 22 yards. Some of his key plays include his first touchdown of his 2009 freshman year and a game-winning touchdown in a 16–13 victory over the Oklahoma Sooners. Goodwin also returned a kickoff 95 yards for a touchdown to seal the Longhorns' win over the Texas A&M Aggies.

In the 2010 season, Goodwin had 31 receptions for 324 yards and one touchdown. In the 2011 season, he had 33 receptions for 421 yards and two touchdowns. In the 2012 season, Goodwin was named a semifinalist for the Campbell Trophy. In the 2012 Alamo Bowl against Oregon State, Goodwin rushed for a 64-yard touchdown, and caught the game-winning, 36-yard touchdown pass—an effort that was good enough to earn him the game's Offensive Most Valuable Player trophy. In the 2012 season, he had 26 receptions for 340 receiving yards and three receiving touchdowns.

Goodwin went on to compete in the 2013 NFLPA Collegiate Bowl.

== Professional career ==
Pre-draft measurables
Height	Weight	Arm length	Hand span	40-yard dash	10-yard split	20-yard split	20-yard shuttle	Three-cone drill	Vertical jump	Broad jump	Bench press
5 ft 8 7/8 in (1.75 m)	183 lb (83 kg)	31 1/2 in (0.80 m)	8 5/8 in (0.22 m)	4.27 s	1.50 s	2.41 s	4.09 s	6.66 s	42 in (1.07 m)	11 ft 0 in (3.35 m)	13 reps
All values from NFL Combine.

=== Buffalo Bills ===
After posting the third-fastest 40-yard dash time ever at the NFL scouting combine, Goodwin was selected by the Buffalo Bills in the third round, with the 78th overall pick, of the 2013 NFL draft. On May 10, 2013, he signed a four-year contract with the Bills, where he also practiced in his first day of rookie minicamp. He caught his first career touchdown Week 6 against the Cincinnati Bengals, a 40-yard pass from Thaddeus Lewis. Goodwin played 12 games in his rookie season making 17 receptions for 283 receiving yards. He also had 16 kickoff return opportunities totaling 351 returning yards.

In 2014, hobbled by numerous injuries (concussion, ankle, ribs, and hamstring), Goodwin caught only one pass for 42 yards, which came against the Detroit Lions.

After missing five games with broken ribs, Goodwin posted two receptions for 24 yards in the 2015 season.

In 2016, Goodwin posted 29 receptions, 431 yards, and three touchdowns, setting career highs in games played, receptions, and receiving yards. While Goodwin enjoyed his most productive season, he was also inconsistent. His 42.6% catch rate ranked 107th among qualified NFL wide receivers in 2016.

=== San Francisco 49ers (first stint) ===
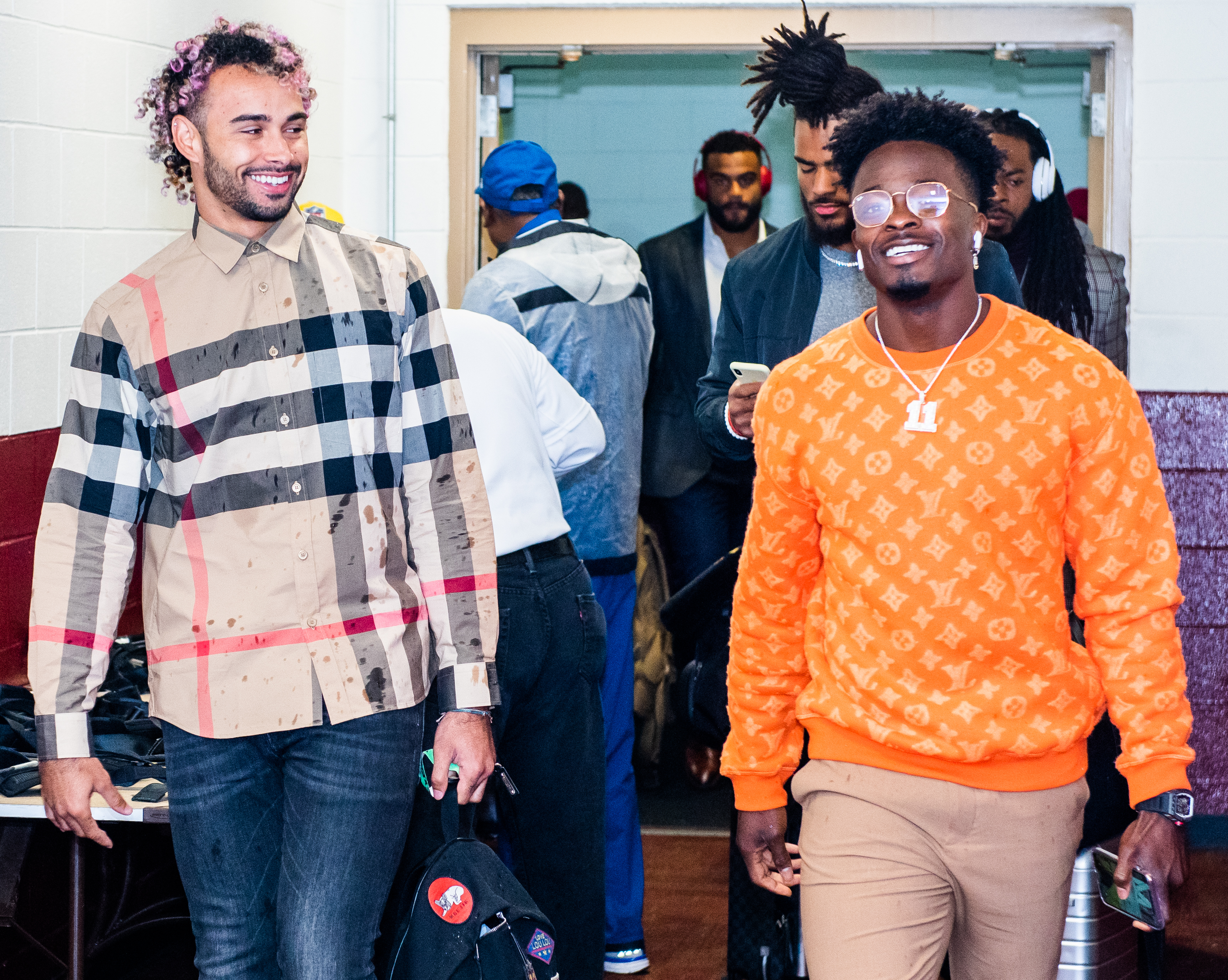
Goodwin alongside teammate Dante Pettis before a game against the Washington Redskins in 2019

On March 9, 2017, Goodwin signed a two-year contract with the San Francisco 49ers. On September 10, 2017, in his 49ers debut, Goodwin had three receptions for 21 yards in the season opening 23–3 loss to the Carolina Panthers. On November 12, 2017, against the New York Giants, he caught his first touchdown of the season on an 83-yard reception. After beating one defender, Goodwin blew a kiss to the sky and once in the end zone, then took a knee in prayer before falling to both knees with his head in hands, as his teammates gathered around him. After the game, in which the 49ers beat the New York Giants for their first win of the season, Goodwin revealed that he and his wife had lost their prematurely born son due to complications during pregnancy in the early morning hours the day of the game. In Week 15, Goodwin caught a career-high 10 passes for 114 yards in a 25–23 win over the Titans. Goodwin established new career highs in receptions and receiving yards in his first season with the 49ers, finishing the season with 56 catches for 962 yards and two touchdowns.

On March 8, 2018, Goodwin signed a three-year, $20.3 million contract extension with the 49ers that would last through the 2021 season.

In Week 6, against the Green Bay Packers, Goodwin set career-highs with 126 yards and two touchdowns. In the 2018 season, he finished with 23 receptions for 395 yards and four touchdowns.

In 2019, Goodwin played in nine games before being placed on injured reserve on December 10, 2019. He finished the season with 12 receptions for 186 yards and a touchdown. Without Goodwin, the 49ers reached Super Bowl LIV, but lost 31–20 to the Kansas City Chiefs.

=== Philadelphia Eagles ===
On April 25, 2020, Goodwin was traded to the Philadelphia Eagles for a swap of sixth-round draft picks in the 2020 NFL draft. After being traded to the Eagles, Goodwin agreed on a restructured contract on a one-year deal worth $1.35 million. On July 28, Goodwin announced he would opt out of the 2020 season due to the COVID-19 pandemic, and to focus more on his family.

=== San Francisco 49ers (second stint) ===
On March 16, 2021, Goodwin reverted to the 49ers due to stipulations from the trade with the Eagles, and the 49ers sent a seventh-round draft pick in the 2021 NFL draft to the Eagles as part of the trade clause. The 49ers released him the next day.

=== Chicago Bears ===
On April 16, 2021, Goodwin signed with the Chicago Bears. He ended the season with 20 receptions, 313 yards, and one touchdown.

=== Seattle Seahawks ===
On May 23, 2022, Goodwin signed with the Seattle Seahawks. In Week 7, against the Los Angeles Chargers, Goodwin had two receiving touchdowns in the 37–23 victory. He played in 13 games with two starts, recording 27 catches for 387 yards and four touchdowns. Goodwin was placed on injured reserve on December 31, due to a shoulder injury.

=== Cleveland Browns ===
On April 14, 2023, Goodwin signed a one-year contract with the Cleveland Browns. On July 21, the Browns placed him on the active/non-football injury list after Goodwin experienced a shortness of breath and pain in his legs. He was diagnosed with blood clots in his legs and lungs, but was expected to make a full recovery before the 2023 season began. On August 29, Marquise was removed from the non-football illness list and practiced with the team.

In the first two weeks of the 2023 season, Goodwin was able to play at least ten snaps in each game, but could not make a catch. On September 24, he rushed for one yard on one carry, and had a season-low snap count.

== Career statistics ==
=== NFL ===
Year	Team	Games		Receiving					Rushing					Fumbles	
Year	Team	GP	GS	Rec	Yds	Avg	Lng	TD	Att	Yds	Avg	Lng	TD	Fum	Lost
2013	BUF	12	1	17	283	16.6	59T	3	3	13	4.3	17	0	1	1
2014	BUF	10	0	1	42	42.0	42	0	3	8	2.7	12	0	1	0
2015	BUF	2	0	2	24	12.0	14	0	—	—	—	—	—	0	0
2016	BUF	15	9	29	431	14.9	84T	3	—	—	—	—	—	0	0
2017	SF	16	6	56	962	17.2	83T	2	4	44	11.0	18	0	0	0
2018	SF	11	8	23	395	17.2	67T	4	4	9	2.3	5	0	1	0
2019	SF	9	6	12	186	15.5	38T	1	1	15	15.0	15	0	0	0
2020	PHI	0	0	Did not play due to Covid-19 opt-out											
2021	CHI	14	2	20	313	15.7	50T	1	2	-1	-0.5	1	0	1	0
2022	SEA	13	2	27	387	14.3	38	4	2	5	2.5	7	0	0	0
2023	CLE	12	0	4	67	16.8	0	0	1	1	1.0	1	0	0	0
Career		105	44	187	3,023	16.2	84	18	20	94	4.7	18	0	4	1

=== College ===
Season	Team	GP	Receiving				Rushing			
Season	Team	GP	Rec	Yds	Avg	TD	Att	Yds	Avg	TD
2009	Texas	14	30	279	9.3	1	2	8	4.0	0
2010	Texas	11	31	324	10.5	1	9	37	4.1	0
2011	Texas	12	33	421	12.8	2	22	220	10.0	0
2012	Texas	13	26	340	13.1	3	13	140	10.8	3
Career		50	120	1,364	11.4	7	46	405	8.8	3

== Track career ==
Marquise Goodwin
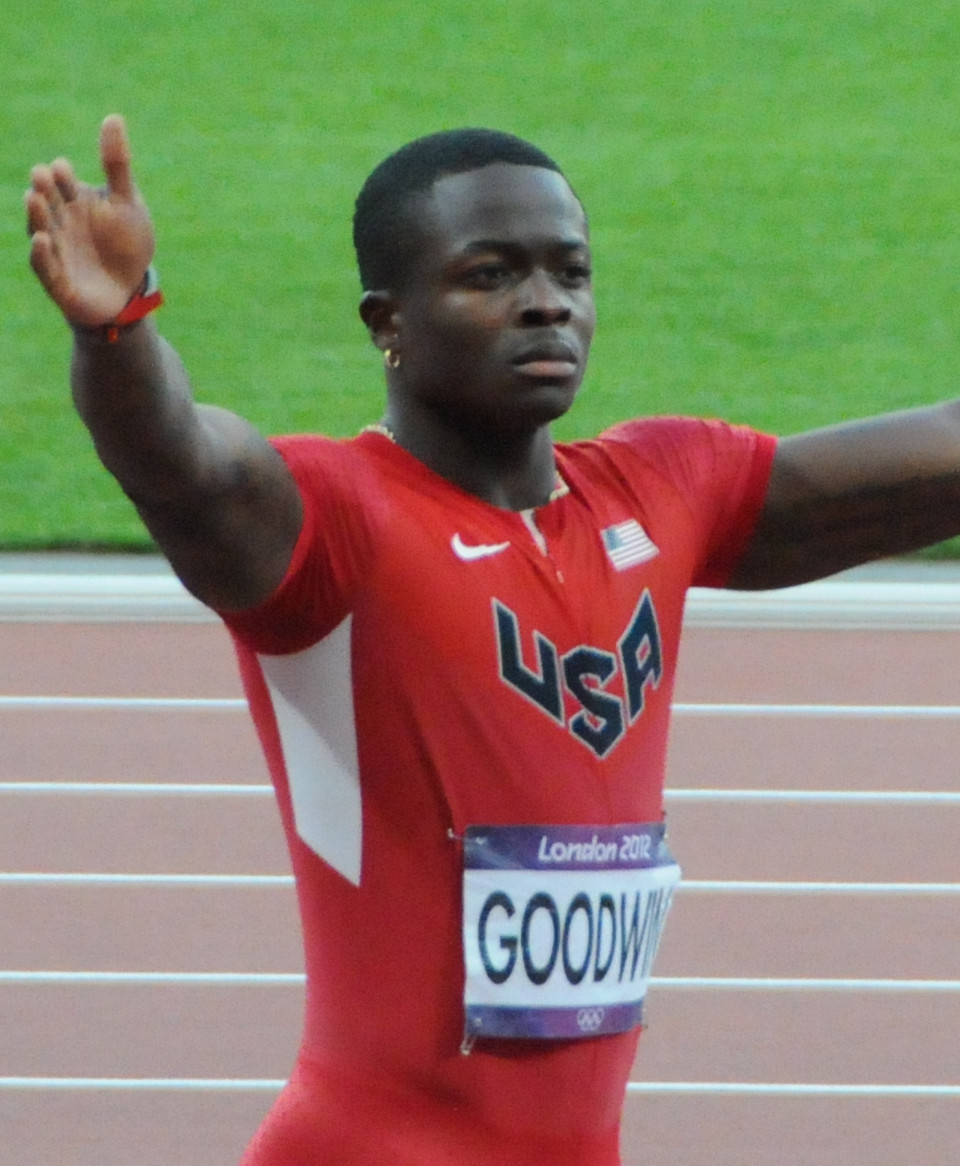
- Goodwin at the 2012 Olympic Games

Personal information
- Nationality: American
- Height: 5 ft 9 in (1.75 m)
- Weight: 192 lb (87 kg)

Sport
- Country: United States
- Sport: Track and Field
- Events: Long Jump, 60 m, 100 m, 200 m, 4 × 100, Triple Jump
- College team: University of Texas

Achievements and titles
- Personal bests: Long Jump: 8.45m, (Guadeloupe 2016); 60 m: 6.67s, (Portland Convention Center 2016); 100 m: 10.24ws (10.24w), (Austin, TX 2009); 200 m: 21.24s, (Austin, TX 2009); Triple Jump: 15.38m, (Austin, TX 2009)
Medal record
Men's athletics
Representing the United States
Summer Universiade
Silver medal – second place	2011 Shenzhen	Long Jump
World Junior Championships
Gold medal – first place	2008 Bydgoszcz	Long Jump
Gold medal – first place	2008 Bydgoszcz	4 × 100 m
Pan American Games
Silver medal – second place	2015 Toronto	Long Jump

Goodwin qualified for the 2012 United States Olympic team in the long jump with a career-best and meet-best mark of 8.33m (27-04.25) at the US Olympic Team Trials. At the 2012 Summer Olympics, he qualified for the finals on his first jump of 8.11m (26-7), but he failed to match that performance in the finals and finished in 10th place.

In 2015, after a three-year absence, he returned to track and field. In his first event back, despite jumping a career best 8.37m (27-05.5), he finished in fourth place, just missing qualification for the World Championship. A month later, at the 2015 Pan Am Games, he earned a silver medal with a jump of 8.27m (27-1).

In 2016, Goodwin won the long jump at the Rod McCravy Invitational in Kentucky and placed third in the Millrose Games in New York. In New York he also placed 6th in the 60 m dash, with a then career best 6.68s. In March, he placed third at the United States Indoor Track and Field Championships while also making it to the semifinals in the 60-meter dash with another personal best. He won the long jump at the Meeting Region Guadeloupe with a personal best mark of 8.45 m (27 ft 8 1/2 in), also a world-leading mark at the time of the meet. Then a month later, he won the long jump at the IAAF Diamond League meet in Birmingham, England. However, he did not qualify for the US team at the Rio Olympics as he finished seventh at the Olympic Trials in July.

In August 2017, Goodwin was issued with a one-year ban backdated to April 2017 by the US Anti-Doping Agency (USADA) after failing to maintain his whereabouts details. Although Goodwin said that he had retired from the sport in 2016, it was reported that he had failed to provide his whereabouts for drug testing or formally retire, despite USADA's repeated notifications of his obligations.

In June 2021, Goodwin competed in the long jump field in the 2020 Olympic Trials. However, Goodwin was unable to qualify for the Games after placing 19th out of 24 jumpers with his best jump being a 24-foot, 10-inch leap.

== Personal life ==
Goodwin is married to former Longhorn hurdler champion Morgan Snow-Goodwin. On November 12, 2017, their premature son died just hours prior to the 49ers' game against the New York Giants. In November 2018, Goodwin missed two games when he and his wife lost their unborn twin boys. Goodwin and his wife had three children between 2020 and 2024. Goodwin is a cousin of former San Francisco 49ers teammate, Adrian Colbert.
