= 2011 World University Games =

2011 World University Games may refer to:

- 2011 Summer Universiade, August 12–23 in Shenzhen, China
- 2011 Winter Universiade, January 27-August 6 in Erzurum, Turkey
