= T. J. Graham =

American football player and coach (born 1989)

Green Bay Packers
- Title: Bill Walsh diversity coaching fellowship

Personal information
- Born: July 27, 1989 (age 37); Raleigh, North Carolina, U.S.
- Listed height: 5 ft 11 in (1.80 m)
- Listed weight: 188 lb (85 kg)

Career information
- High school: Wakefield (Raleigh)
- College: NC State (2008–2011)
- NFL draft: 2012: 3rd round, 69th overall pick

Career history

Playing
- Buffalo Bills (2012–2013); Tennessee Titans (2014); New York Jets (2014); New Orleans Saints (2015); Philadelphia Eagles (2016)*; Montreal Alouettes (2017); Carolina Panthers (2017)*; Montreal Alouettes (2017–2019)
- * Offseason or practice squad member only

Coaching
- Green Bay Packers (2022–present) Bill Walsh diversity coaching fellowship

Awards and highlights
- First-team All-ACC (2011)

Career NFL statistics
- Receptions: 61
- Receiving yards: 794
- Receiving touchdowns: 4
- Stats at Pro Football Reference
- Stats at CFL.ca

Trevor "T. J." Graham Jr. (born July 27, 1989) is an American former professional football player who was a wide receiver in the National Football League (NFL). He was selected by the Buffalo Bills in the third round of the 2012 NFL draft. He played college football for the NC State Wolfpack.

== Early life ==
Graham attended Wakefield High School in Raleigh, North Carolina. He caught seven passes for 100 yards and two touchdowns his senior season and had two kickoff returns for 109 yards. Rated as a two-star recruit by Rivals.com, his only offer came from North Carolina State, which he accepted.

== College career ==
During his four-year tenure at NC State, he finished as the ACC career leader in kickoff return yards with 3,153. He also accumulated 99 receptions for 1,453 receiving yards and 16 total touchdowns (12 receiving, 2 kick return TD's and 2 punt return TD's).

Graham was also a track athlete. He finished third nationally in the 100-meter dash at the Nike Nationals in 2007, he was the 2008 4A state champion in the 100 and 200 meters, posting times of 10.44 seconds and 20.82 seconds, respectively. He recorded personal bests of 10.21 seconds in the 100 meters and 20.79 seconds in the 200 meters.

== Professional career ==
Pre-draft measurables
Height	Weight	40-yard dash	10-yard split	20-yard split	20-yard shuttle	Three-cone drill	Vertical jump	Broad jump	Bench press
5 ft 11 in (1.80 m)	188 lb (85 kg)	4.41 s	1.53 s	2.50 s	4.18 s	6.77 s	34 in (0.86 m)	10 ft 0 in (3.05 m)	8 reps
All values from NFL Combine

=== Buffalo Bills ===
Graham was selected by the Buffalo Bills in the third round (69th overall) of the 2012 NFL draft. On July 9, 2012, he signed a four-year with the Bills. In his rookie season, he caught his first career touchdown reception from Ryan Fitzpatrick in a 24–14 win over the Cleveland Browns. He was released by the Bills on August 30, 2014.

=== Tennessee Titans ===
On August 31, 2014, Graham was claimed off waivers by the Tennessee Titans. He was waived on September 23, 2014.

=== New York Jets ===
Graham signed with the New York Jets on September 29, 2014. On August 29, 2015, Graham was released.

=== New Orleans Saints ===
On October 20, 2015, Graham signed with the New Orleans Saints. On October 24, he was waived by the Saints. On October 28, 2015, Graham was re-signed by the Saints. He was waived again on October 30, 2015 to make room for linebacker Jo-Lonn Dunbar. He re-signed with the Saints again on November 3, 2015. He was waived once again by the Saints on December 23, to make room for Travaris Cadet.

=== Philadelphia Eagles ===
Graham signed a one-year contract with the Philadelphia Eagles on April 22, 2016, following a mini-camp tryout. On August 21, 2016, Graham was released by the Eagles.

=== Montreal Alouettes (first stint) ===
On May 11, 2017, Graham signed with the Montreal Alouettes of the Canadian Football League.

=== Carolina Panthers ===
On July 24, 2017, Graham signed with the Carolina Panthers. He was released on September 1, 2017.

=== Montreal Alouettes (second stint) ===
On October 23, 2017, Graham signed with the Alouettes. He was released by the Alouettes on August 21, 2018. He was then resigned to the practice squad.

=== Coaching career ===
On May 11, 2022, Graham was announced as a member of the Green Bay Packers Bill Walsh diversity coaching fellowship program. In 2025, Graham was introduced his first Head Coaching Job at St. Davids School in his hometown of Raleigh, North Carolina.
