= Davonte Stewart =

American sprinter

Personal information
- Nationality: United States
- Born: June 11, 1993 (age 33) Rialto, California
- Height: 6 ft 1 in (1.85 m)
- Weight: 160 lb (73 kg)

Sport
- Sport: Running
- Events: 100 metres, 200 metres
- College team: USC Trojans

Achievements and titles
- Personal bests: 100m: 10.51 (Norwalk 2011); 200m: 20.55 (Eugene 2012)

Davonte Stewart (born June 11, 1993) is an American sprinter who specializes in the 100 and 200 metres. He graduated from the University of Southern California in May 2015 with a degree in Communications and is one of the top 200m runners on the West Coast. He was one of USC's top 400m runners.

== Early years ==
A native of Rialto, California, Stewart attended A. B. Miller High School in Fontana, California, where he burst onto the scene at the 2010 CIF Southern Section, winning both the 100 m and 200 m.

== High School athletics ==
At the 2010 CIF California State Meet, he was runner-up in the 200 m behind Remontay McClain. In 2011, he repeated as 100 m champion at the CIF SS meet, with a personal best of 10.51 s. He was classified as a junior athlete for the 2012 season, and Stewart was eligible for the 2012 World Junior Championships in Athletics.

== USC ==
In his freshman year at USC, Stewart ran a 20.62 in the 200 m at the Trojan Invitational in Los Angeles. He finished third in 200 m at the 2012 Pac-12 Outdoor Track & Field Championships at Hayward Field, Eugene, Oregon, behind only James Alaka and Aaron Brown.
