= Devontae =

Devontae is a given name. Notable people with the name include:

- Devontae Booker (born 1992), American football player
- Devontae Cacok (born 1996), American basketball player
- Devontae Shuler (born 1998), American basketball player

== See also ==
- Devonta, given name
- Devonte, given name
