= Devonta =

Devonta is a given name. Notable people with the given name include:

- Devonta Freeman (born 1992), American football player
- Devonta Glover-Wright or Tay Glover-Wright (born 1992), American football player
- Devonta Pollard (born 1994), American basketball player
- DeVonta Smith (born 1998), American football player

== See also ==
- Devontae, given name
- Devonte, given name
