= Devonte =

Devonte is a given name. Notable people with the name include:

- Devonte Brown (born 1992), American basketball player
- DeVonte Dedmon (born 1995), American football player
- Devonte Fields (born 1993), American player of Canadian football
- Devonte' Graham (born 1995), American basketball player
- Devonte Green (born 1997), American basketball player
- DeVonte Holloman (born 1991), American football player
- Devonte Patterson (born 1996), American basketball player
- Devonte Redmond (born 1991), American football player
- Devonte Ross (born 2002), American football player
- Devonte Small (born 1985), American soccer player
- Devonte Smith (born 1993), American mixed martial artist
- Devonte Upson (born 1993), American basketball player
- Devonte Williams (born 1997), Canadian football player
- Devonte Wyatt (born 1998), American football player

== See also ==
- Davonte, given name
- Devonta, given name
- Devontae, given name
