= Jonathan Meeks =

American football player (born 1989)

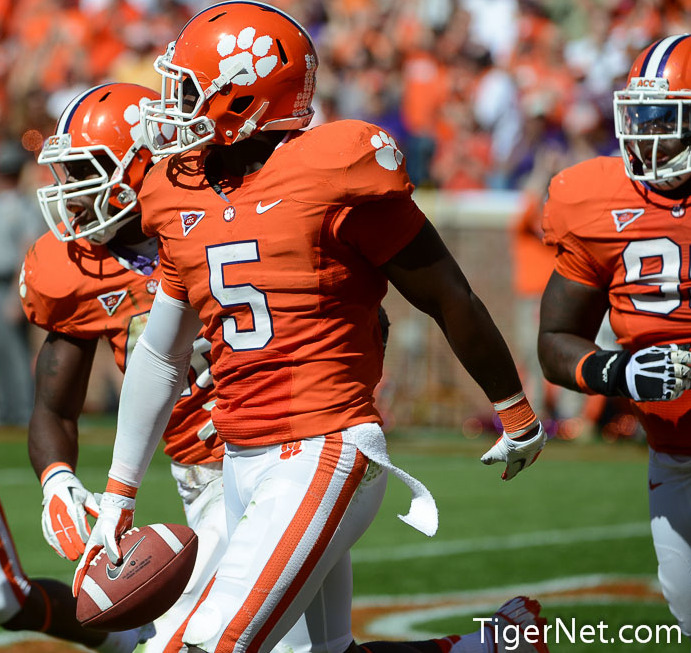
- Meeks with the Clemson Tigers in 2012

No. 36
- Position: Safety

Personal information
- Born: November 8, 1989 (age 36); Rock Hill, South Carolina, U.S.
- Listed height: 6 ft 1 in (1.85 m)
- Listed weight: 210 lb (95 kg)

Career information
- High school: Rock Hill
- College: Clemson
- NFL draft: 2013: 5th round, 143rd overall pick

Career history
- Buffalo Bills (2013–2016)

Career NFL statistics
- Total tackles: 31
- Forced fumbles: 1
- Fumble recoveries: 1
- Pass deflections: 1
- Stats at Pro Football Reference

Jonathan Meeks (born November 8, 1989) is an American former professional football player who was a safety in the National Football League (NFL). He played college football for the Clemson Tigers and was selected by the Buffalo Bills in the fifth round of the 2013 NFL draft.

== Early life ==
Meeks attended Rock Hill High School in Rock Hill, South Carolina, where he played quarterback and free safety as a senior. He had 896 rushing yards and 14 touchdowns, and 612 passing yards and seven touchdowns. Defensively, he recorded 69 tackles and two interceptions. He spent one semester at Hargrave Military Academy in Chatham, Virginia following high school, in order to raise his necessary test scores for NCAA standards.

He was rated a four-star recruit by Rivals.com.

== College career ==
While attending Clemson University in Clemson, South Carolina, Meeks played for the Tigers from 2009 to 2012.

== Professional career ==
He was selected by the Buffalo Bills in the fifth round, 143rd overall, of the 2013 NFL draft.

Expected to back up Aaron Williams at strong safety with Duke Williams, who was also selected in the 2013 NFL draft. He was injured while playing against Cincinnati Bengals in Week 4 and was placed on the injured reserve designated to return list. He was released by the Bills on September 5, 2015. On September 6, 2015, the Bills signed Meeks to their practice squad. On September 23, 2015, Meeks was promoted to the active roster from the practice squad.

=== NFL statistics ===
Year	Team	GP	COMB	TOTAL	AST	SACK	FF	FR	FR YDS	INT	IR YDS	AVG IR	LNG	TD	PD
2013	BUF	8	2	1	1	0.0	0	0	0	0	0	0	0	0	0
2015	BUF	12	12	8	4	0.0	1	0	0	0	0	0	0	0	0
2016	BUF	16	17	12	4	0.0	0	0	0	0	0	0	0	0	1
Career		36	31	22	9	0.0	1	0	0	0	0	0	0	0	1

== Legacy & awards ==
In 2024, Meeks was inducted into the York County Sports Hall of Fame.
