= 2015 Buffalo Bills season =

56th season in franchise history

- Owner: Terry and Kim Pegula
- General manager: Doug Whaley
- Head coach: Rex Ryan
- Home stadium: Ralph Wilson Stadium

Results
- Record: 8–8
- Division place: 3rd AFC East
- Playoffs: Did not qualify
- Pro Bowlers: RB LeSean McCoy; QB Tyrod Taylor; C Eric Wood; OG Richie Incognito

Uniform
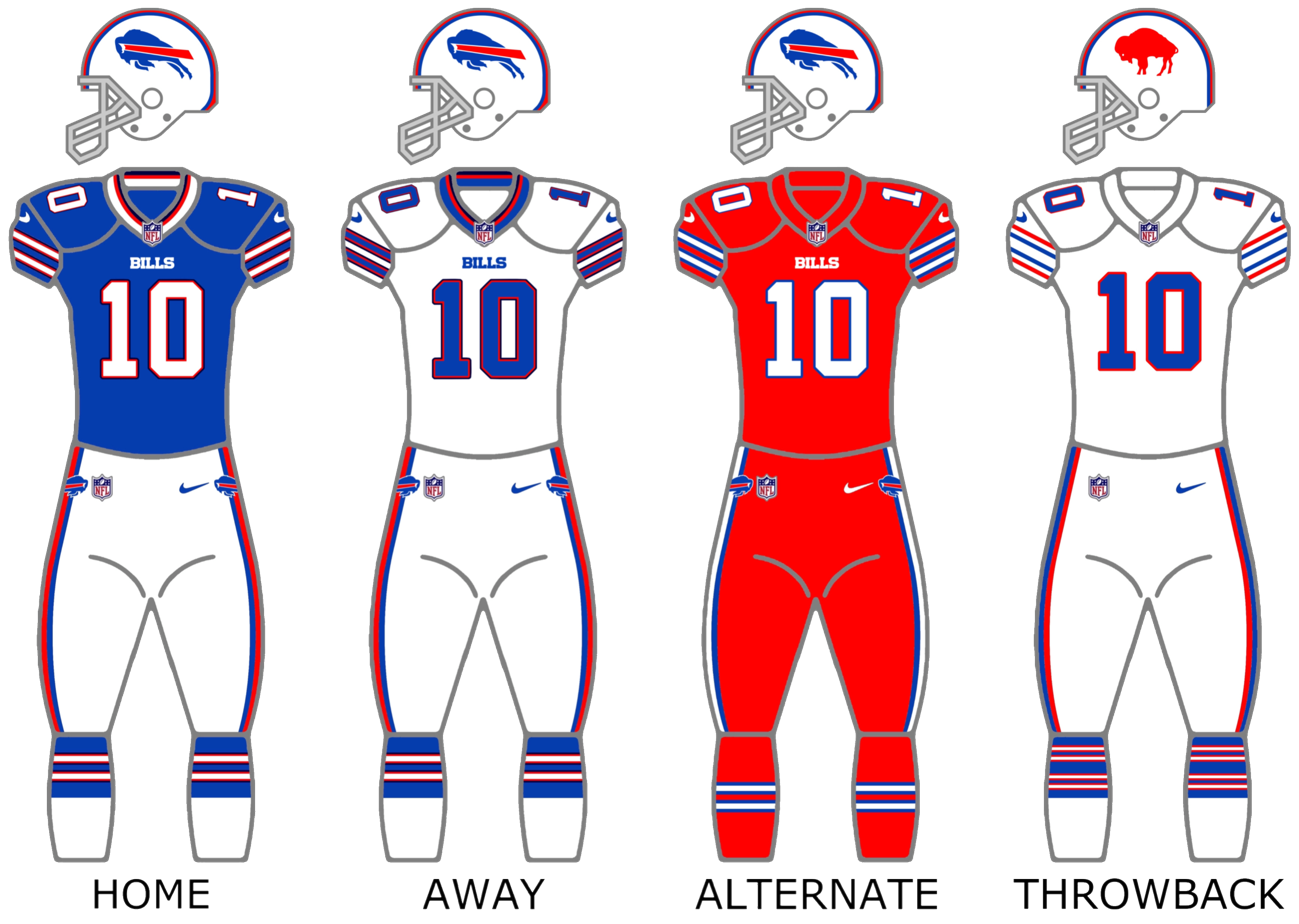

The 2015 season was the Buffalo Bills' 46th in the National Football League (NFL), their 56th overall, their third under the leadership of general manager Doug Whaley and their first under head coach Rex Ryan. It was also their first full season under the ownership of Terry and Kim Pegula (who also own the Buffalo Sabres), having purchased the Bills partway through 2014 after the death of longtime owner Ralph Wilson that March at the age of 95.

The Bills began their season with an open competition for the starting quarterback position after Kyle Orton, the starter for most of the 2014 campaign, retired during the offseason, so the team acquired free agent Tyrod Taylor, a former backup quarterback of the Baltimore Ravens, who won the competition over incumbent second-string quarterback EJ Manuel and trade acquisition Matt Cassel, the latter of whom the team later traded along with a seventh-round pick in 2017 to the Dallas Cowboys, in exchange for a fifth-round draft pick in 2017.

Despite Ryan's bold prediction of the Bills making the playoffs at his introductory press conference, the Bills were unable to do so in their first season with Ryan as head coach, finishing with a record of 8-8 (the team’s first since 2002), making it the 16th straight season without a playoff appearance, which became the longest active in major professional sports after Major League Baseball’s Toronto Blue Jays broke their 22-year playoff drought on September 25, 2015.

== Offseason ==
The Bills made headlines when they hired a new head coach in Rex Ryan, who signed a five-year, $27.5 million contract on January 12, 2015 after having previously spent the past six seasons coaching the division-rival New York Jets. Ryan had led the Jets to two straight AFC Championship games in 2009 and 2010 before his firing in 2014. He became the 18th head coach in Bills history and the fifth in the past seven years in the process. Ryan replaced Doug Marrone, who opted out of his contract on December 31, 2014 in order to take advantage of a contract loophole.

== Roster changes ==
=== Signings ===
| Position | Player | 2014 Team | Date signed | Notes and references |
|---|---|---|---|---|
| OG | Richie Incognito | No Team | February 8, 2015 | 1-year/$2.25 million |
| DE | Jerry Hughes | Buffalo Bills | March 9, 2015 | 5-years/$45 million |
| FB | Jerome Felton | Minnesota Vikings | March 11, 2015 | 4-years/$9.2 million |
| WR | Marcus Easley | Buffalo Bills | March 12, 2015 | 4-years/$7 million |
| DE | Jarius Wynn | Buffalo Bills | March 12, 2015 | 2-years/$2.2 million |
| QB | Tyrod Taylor | Baltimore Ravens | March 12, 2015 | 2-years/$7 million |
| WR | Percy Harvin | New York Jets | March 13, 2015 | 3-years/$24 million |
| TE | Charles Clay | Miami Dolphins | March 19, 2015 | 5-years/$38 million |
| DE | Alex Carrington | St. Louis Rams | May 4, 2015 | 1-year |
| FB | John Conner | New York Jets | May 13, 2015 | 1-year/$745,000 |
| QB | Matt Simms | New York Jets | May 29, 2015 | 1-year/$585,000 |

=== Free agents lost ===
| Position | Player | 2015 Team | Date signed | Notes and references |
|---|---|---|---|---|
| CB | Da’Norris Searcy | Tennessee Titans | March 10, 2015 | 4-years/$24 million |
| TE | Lee Smith | Oakland Raiders | March 10, 2015 | 3-years/$9.1 million |
| RB | C. J. Spiller | New Orleans Saints | March 13, 2015 | 4-years/$18 million |
| TE | Scott Chandler | New England Patriots | March 13, 2015 | 2-years/$5.3 million |
| OT | Erik Pears | San Francisco 49ers | March 14, 2015 | 2-years/$4.7 million |
| LB | Larry Dean | Tampa Bay Buccaneers | April 9, 2015 | 1-year/$745,000 |
| OT | Chris Hairston | San Diego Chargers | April 15, 2015 | 1-year |
| LB | Brandon Spikes | New England Patriots | May 18, 2015 | 1-year (Released June 8, 2015) |

=== Trades ===
| Player/picks acquired | From | Date traded | Player/picks traded |
|---|---|---|---|
| LeSean McCoy | Philadelphia Eagles | March 10, 2015 | Kiko Alonso |
| Matt Cassel; Minnesota’s 2015 6th Round Pick | Minnesota Vikings | March 10, 2015 | Tampa Bay's 2015 5th Round Pick; Buffalo’s 2016 7th Round Pick |
| Dallas’ 2017 5th Round Pick | Dallas Cowboys | September 25, 2015 | Matt Cassel; Buffalo’s 2017 7th Round Pick |

== Draft ==
2015 Buffalo Bills draft
| Round | Pick | Player | Position | College | Notes |
| 2 | 50 | Ronald Darby | CB | Florida St | |
| 3 | 81 | John Miller | OG | Louisville | |
| 5 | 155 | Karlos Williams | RB | Florida St | |
| 6 | 188 | Tony Steward | OLB | Clemson | |
| 6 | 194 | Nick O'Leary | TE | Florida St | |
| 7 | 234 | Dezmin Lewis | WR | Central Arkansas | |
Made roster † Pro Football Hall of Fame * Made at least one Pro Bowl during career

Notes

- The Bills did not have a selection in the first-round or fourth-round as a result of a trade that sent their 2014 first-round selection (19th overall), later revealed to be Ja’Wuan James, to the Miami Dolphins, fourth-round selection (115th overall), later revealed to be Shaquelle Evans, to the New York Jets and their first-round selection (9th overall), later revealed to be Anthony Barr, to the Cleveland Browns in a three-team trade that sent the Browns’ 2014 first-round selection (4th overall), later revealed to be Sammy Watkins, to Buffalo. The Bills acquired a fourth-round selection (113th overall), later revealed to be Gabe Wright, in a trade that sent Stevie Johnson to the San Francisco 49ers. The Bills later traded this selection to the Philadelphia Eagles in exchange for Bryce Brown. The Bills acquired a fifth-round selection (137th overall), later revealed to be Grady Jarrett, as part of a trade that sent their 2014 seventh-round selection (221st overall), later revealed to be Randell Johnson, to the Tampa Bay Buccaneers. The Bills later traded this selection and their 2016 seventh-round selection (240th overall), later revealed to be Alex McCalister, to the Vikings in exchange for Matt Cassel and the Vikings’ 2015 sixth-round selection (188th overall), later revealed to be Tony Steward.

== Staff ==
2015 Buffalo Bills staff
| Front office: Owner/CEO – Terry Pegula; Owner – Kim Pegula; President – Russ Brandon; General manager – Doug Whaley; Senior vice president of football administration – Jim Overdorf; Director of player personnel – Jim Monos; Director of college scouting – Kelvin Fisher; Director of football administration – Don Purdy; Director of football operations – Kevin Meganck; Director of pro personnel – Rob Hanrahan; Director of analytics – Michael Lyons; Special Assistant – Buddy Nix; Head coaches: Head coach – Rex Ryan; Assistant head coach/running backs – Anthony Lynn; Administrative assistant to the head coach – Kathryn Smith; Offensive coaches: Offensive coordinator – Greg Roman; Quarterbacks – David Lee; Wide receivers – Sanjay Lal; Tight ends – Tony Sparano Jr; Offensive line – Aaron Kromer; Assistant offensive line – Kurt Anderson; Senior offensive assistant – Chris Palmer; Offensive quality control – Jason Vrable | Defensive coaches: Defensive coordinator – Dennis Thurman; Defensive line – Karl Dunbar; Assistant defensive line – Jeff Weeks; Outside linebackers – Jason Rebrovich; Linebackers – Bobby April III; Defensive backs – Donnie Henderson; Defensive backs – Tim McDonald; Defensive assistant – D'Anton Lynn; Special teams coaches: Special teams coordinator – Danny Crossman; Assistant special teams – Eric Smith; Special teams quality control – Michael Hamlin; Coaching assistant – Deuce Schwartz; Strength and conditioning: Head strength and conditioning – Eric Ciano; Assistant strength and conditioning – Hal Luther; Assistant strength and conditioning – Dan Liburd; Assistant strength and conditioning – Jason Oszvart; Assistant strength and conditioning – Mark Loecher |

== Final roster ==
2015 Buffalo Bills roster
| Quarterbacks (QB): 8 Josh Johnson; 3 EJ Manuel; 5 Tyrod Taylor; Running backs (RB): 26 Anthony Dixon; 42 Jerome Felton FB; 35 Mike Gillislee; 25 LeSean McCoy; 29 Karlos Williams; Wide receivers (WR): 80 Leonard Hankerson; 15 Chris Hogan; 13 Dezmin Lewis; 19 Walt Powell; 17 Greg Salas; 14 Sammy Watkins; Tight ends (TE): 89 Chris Gragg; 84 Nick O'Leary | Offensive linemen (OL): 72 Ryan Groy C; 77 Cordy Glenn T; 64 Richie Incognito G; 71 Cyrus Kouandjio T; 76 John Miller G; 79 Jordan Mills T; 60 Kraig Urbik G; 70 Eric Wood C; Defensive linemen (DL): 90 T. J. Barnes DT; 97 Corbin Bryant DT; 96 Stefan Charles DT; 99 Marcell Dareus DT; 93 Lavar Edwards DE; 75 IK Enemkpali DE; 55 Jerry Hughes DE; 94 Mario Williams DE; 69 Jerel Worthy DT | Linebackers (LB): 53 Nigel Bradham OLB; 52 Preston Brown MLB; 91 Manny Lawson OLB; 51 Kevin Reddick MLB; 59 A. J. Tarpley MLB; 54 Max Valles OLB; Defensive backs (DB): 39 Mario Butler CB; 28 Ronald Darby CB; 20 Corey Graham SS; 21 Leodis McKelvin CB; 36 Jonathan Meeks SS; 46 Merrill Noel CB; 30 Bacarri Rambo FS; 37 Nickell Robey CB; 44 Sammy Seamster CB; 27 Duke Williams FS; Special teams (ST): 2 Dan Carpenter K; 4 Jordan Gay KOS; 65 Garrison Sanborn LS; 6 Colton Schmidt P | Practice squad: 86 Blake Annen TE; 31 Jonathan Dowling FS; 7 Zac Dysert QB; 47 Manasseh Garner TE; 87 Jacob Maxwell TE; 62 Ronald Patrick C; 56 Cedric Reed DE; 68 Cyril Richardson G; 43 Phillip Thomas SS; Reserve: 33 Ron Brooks CB (IR); 98 Alex Carrington DE (IR); 79 Tyson Chandler RT (IR); 85 Charles Clay TE (IR); 81 Marcus Easley WR (IR); 24 Stephon Gilmore CB (IR); 88 Marquise Goodwin WR (IR); 48 MarQueis Gray TE (IR); 18 Percy Harvin WR (IR); 66 Seantrel Henderson LT (NF-Ill.); 58 Randell Johnson OLB (IR); 57 Ty Powell MLB (IR); 50 Tony Steward MLB (IR); 41 Cam Thomas CB (PUP); 23 Aaron Williams FS (IR/DFR); 95 Kyle Williams DT (IR); 41 Cierre Wood RB (IR); 10 Robert Woods WR (IR); 92 Jarius Wynn DE (IR); Rookies in italics 53 active, 19 reserve, 9 practice squad |

== Schedule ==
=== Preseason ===
| Week | Date | Opponent | Result | Record | Venue | Recap |
|---|---|---|---|---|---|---|
| 1 | August 14 | Carolina Panthers | **L** 24–25 | 0–1 | Ralph Wilson Stadium | Recap |
| 2 | August 20 | at Cleveland Browns | **W** 11–10 | 1–1 | FirstEnergy Stadium | Recap |
| 3 | August 29 | Pittsburgh Steelers | **W** 43–19 | 2–1 | Ralph Wilson Stadium | Recap |
| 4 | September 3 | at Detroit Lions | **L** 10–17 | 2–2 | Ford Field | Recap |

=== Regular season ===
| Week | Date | Opponent | Result | Record | Venue | Recap |
|---|---|---|---|---|---|---|
| 1 | September 13 | Indianapolis Colts | **W** 27–14 | 1–0 | Ralph Wilson Stadium | Recap |
| 2 | September 20 | **New England Patriots** | **L** 32–40 | 1–1 | Ralph Wilson Stadium | Recap |
| 3 | September 27 | at **Miami Dolphins** | **W** 41–14 | 2–1 | Sun Life Stadium | Recap |
| 4 | October 4 | New York Giants | **L** 10–24 | 2–2 | Ralph Wilson Stadium | Recap |
| 5 | October 11 | at Tennessee Titans | **W** 14–13 | 3–2 | Nissan Stadium | Recap |
| 6 | October 18 | Cincinnati Bengals | **L** 21–34 | 3–3 | Ralph Wilson Stadium | Recap |
| 7 | October 25 | at Jacksonville Jaguars | **L** 31–34 | 3–4 | (United Kingdom) Wembley Stadium (London) | Recap |
| 8 | Bye | | | | | |
| 9 | November 8 | **Miami Dolphins** | **W** 33–17 | 4–4 | Ralph Wilson Stadium | Recap |
| 10 | November 12 | at **New York Jets** | **W** 22–17 | 5–4 | MetLife Stadium | Recap |
| 11 | November 23 | at **New England Patriots** | **L** 13–20 | 5–5 | Gillette Stadium | Recap |
| 12 | November 29 | at Kansas City Chiefs | **L** 22–30 | 5–6 | Arrowhead Stadium | Recap |
| 13 | December 6 | Houston Texans | **W** 30–21 | 6–6 | Ralph Wilson Stadium | Recap |
| 14 | December 13 | at Philadelphia Eagles | **L** 20–23 | 6–7 | Lincoln Financial Field | Recap |
| 15 | December 20 | at Washington Redskins | **L** 25–35 | 6–8 | FedExField | Recap |
| 16 | December 27 | Dallas Cowboys | **W** 16–6 | 7–8 | Ralph Wilson Stadium | Recap |
| 17 | January 3 | **New York Jets** | **W** 22–17 | 8–8 | Ralph Wilson Stadium | Recap |

Note: Intra-division opponents are in bold text.

== Game summaries ==
=== Week 1: vs. Indianapolis Colts ===
Week One: Indianapolis Colts at Buffalo Bills – Game summary

| Quarter | 1 | 2 | 3 | 4 | Total |
|---|---|---|---|---|---|
| Colts | 0 | 0 | 0 | 14 | 14 |
| Bills | 7 | 10 | 7 | 3 | 27 |

at Ralph Wilson Stadium, Orchard Park, New York

- Date: September 13
- Game time: 1:00pm EDT
- Game weather: 56 °F (13 °C), cloudy
- Game attendance: 70,319
- Referee: John Parry
- TV announcers (CBS): Spero Dedes and Solomon Wilcots
- Recap, Gamebook

Game information

First quarter

- BUF: Percy Harvin 51-yard pass from Tyrod Taylor, Dan Carpenter XP good, (BUF 7–0). Drive: 5 plays, 68 yards, 2:39

Second quarter

- BUF Dan Carpenter 41-yard field goal, (BUF 10-0). Drive: 7 plays, 43 yards, 3:22
- BUF: Karlos Williams 26-yard run, Dan Carpenter XP good, (BUF 17-0). Drive: 5 plays, 58 yards, 2:22

Third quarter

- BUF: Anthony Dixon 1-yard run, Dan Carpenter XP good, (BUF 24-0). Drive: 11 plays, 80 yards, 5:26
- IND: Donte Moncrief 2-yard pass from Andrew Luck, Andrew Luck-Coby Fleener 2-point conversion good, (BUF 24-8). Drive: 18 plays, 65 yards, 8:40

Fourth quarter

- BUF Dan Carpenter 45-yard field goal, (BUF 27-8). Drive: 4 plays, 1 yard, 1:30
- IND: Dwayne Allen 6-yard pass from Andrew Luck, 2-point conversion failed, (BUF 27-14). Drive: 9 plays, 80 yards, 2:18

Top passers

- IND – Andrew Luck, 26/49, 243 yards, 2 TD, 2 INT
- BUF – Tyrod Taylor, 14/19, 195 yards, TD

Top rushers

- IND – Frank Gore, 8 carries, 31 yards
- BUF – Karlos Williams, 6 carries, 55 yards, TD

Top receivers

- IND – T.Y. Hilton, 7 receptions, 88 yards
- BUF – Percy Harvin, 5 receptions, 79 yards, TD

Top tacklers

- IND – Henry Anderson, 8 tackles
- BUF – Nigel Bradham, 7 tackles, 1 sack

The Bills franchise reached the 400th career win in its history with a 27-14 win over the Colts. Running backs Karlos Williams, LeSean McCoy and quarterback Tyrod Taylor combined for 137 rushing yards and a touchdown (Anthony Dixon added another on the ground) and Taylor completed 14/19 for 195 yards and a touchdown. Colts quarterback Andrew Luck had two touchdowns, but he was intercepted and sacked twice. In a statistical anomaly, back-up quarterback Matt Cassel was credited with the win, as the Bills lined up for their first offensive play in a novelty formation with Cassel under center and Tyrod Taylor split out as a receiver. This made Cassel the starting quarterback of record, although it was his only play of the game and he did not attempt either a pass or run.

=== Week 2: vs. New England Patriots ===
Week Two: New England Patriots at Buffalo Bills – Game summary

| Quarter | 1 | 2 | 3 | 4 | Total |
|---|---|---|---|---|---|
| Patriots | 14 | 10 | 13 | 3 | 40 |
| Bills | 7 | 6 | 0 | 19 | 32 |

at Ralph Wilson Stadium, Orchard Park, New York

- Date: September 20
- Game time: 1:00pm EDT
- Game weather: 62 °F (17 °C), mostly sunny
- Game attendance: 70,858
- Referee: Ron Torbert
- TV announcers (CBS): Kevin Harlan and Rich Gannon
- Recap, Gamebook

Game information

First quarter

- BUF: Karlos Williams 2-yard run, Dan Carpenter XP good, (BUF 7-0). Drive: 10 plays, 80 yards, 5:00
- NE: Julian Edelman 8-yard pass from Tom Brady, Stephen Gostkowski XP good, (TIE 7-7). Drive: 5 plays, 62 yards, 2:30
- NE: Dion Lewis 6-yard run, Stephen Gostkowski XP good, (NE 14-7). Drive: 2 plays, 13 yards, 00:31

Second quarter

- NE: Rob Gronkowski 2-yard pass from Tom Brady, Stephen Gostkowski XP good, (NE 21-7). Drive: 5 plays, 30 yards, 1:36
- BUF: Charles Clay 9-yard pass from Tyrod Taylor, Dan Carpenter XP failed, (NE 21-13). Drive: 2 plays, 48 yards, 1:25
- NE: Stephen Gostkowski 46-yard FG, (NE 24-13). Drive: 9 plays, 52 yards, 2:55

Third quarter

- NE Stephen Gostkowski 21-yard FG, (NE 27-13). Drive: 12 plays, 77 yards, 4:58
- NE: Julian Edelman 22-yard pass from Tom Brady, Stephen Gostkowski XP good, (NE 34-13). Drive: 9 plays, 83 yards, 3:12
- NE: Stephen Gostkowski 50-yard FG, (NE 37-13). Drive: 6 plays, 23 yards, 00:59

Fourth quarter

- BUF: Robert Woods 32-yard pass from Tyrod Taylor, 2-point conversion failed, (NE 37-19). Drive: 10 plays, 80 yards, 3:46
- BUF: Tyrod Taylor 7-yard run, 2-point conversion failed, (NE 37-25). Drive: 7 plays, 59 yards, 2:43
- BUF: Sammy Watkins 24-yard pass from Tyrod Taylor, Dan Carpenter XP good, (NE 37-32). Drive: 2 plays, 50 yards, 00:15
- NE: Stephen Gostkowski 25-yard FG, (NE 40-32). Drive: 7 plays, 72 yards, 3:01

Top passers

- NE – Tom Brady, 38/59, 466 yards, 3 TD
- BUF – Tyrod Taylor, 23/30, 242 yards, 3 TD, 3 INT

Top rushers

- NE – Dion Lewis, 7 carries, 40 yards, TD
- BUF – LeSean McCoy, 15 carries, 89 yards

Top receivers

- NE – Rob Gronkowski, 7 receptions, 113 yards, TD
- BUF – Sammy Watkins, 6 receptions, 60 yards, TD

Top tacklers

- NE – Jamie Collins, 8 tackles, 2.5 sacks, 1 forced fumble
- BUF – Preston Brown, 6 tackles, 1 forced fumble

With the close loss, the Bills dropped to 1-1. As if the loss wasn't bad enough, the team also lost safety Aaron Williams for the season with a neck injury sustained trying to keep Patriots tight end Rob Gronkowski from reaching the end zone.

=== Week 3: at Miami Dolphins ===
Week Three: Buffalo Bills at Miami Dolphins – Game summary

| Quarter | 1 | 2 | 3 | 4 | Total |
|---|---|---|---|---|---|
| Bills | 14 | 13 | 0 | 14 | 41 |
| Dolphins | 0 | 0 | 0 | 14 | 14 |

at Sun Life Stadium, Miami Gardens, Florida

- Date: September 27
- Game time: 4:25pm EDT
- Game weather: 87 °F (31 °C), mostly cloudy
- Game attendance: 64,869
- Referee: Jerome Boger
- TV announcers (CBS): Spero Dedes and Solomon Wilcots
- Recap, Gamebook

Game information

First quarter

- BUF: Charles Clay 25-yard pass from Tyrod Taylor, Dan Carpenter XP good, (BUF 7-0). Drive: 5 plays, 77 yards, 2:17
- BUF: LeSean McCoy 10-yard pass from Tyrod Taylor, Dan Carpenter XP good, (BUF 14-0). Drive: 8 plays, 81 yards, 3:40

Second quarter

- BUF: Dan Carpenter 26-yard field goal, (BUF 17-0). Drive: 9 plays, 57 yards, 5:00
- BUF: Preston Brown 43-yard INT return, Dan Carpenter XP good, (BUF 24-0).
- BUF: Dan Carpenter 51-yard field goal, (BUF 27-0). Drive: 4 plays, 16 yards, 00:42

Third quarter

- MIA: Rishard Matthews 21-yard pass from Ryan Tannehill, 2pt conversion good, (BUF 27-8). Drive: 6 plays, 56 yards, 3:14

Fourth quarter

- BUF: Chris Hogan 38-yard pass from Tyrod Taylor, Dan Carpenter XP good, (BUF 34-8). Drive: 11 plays, 80 yards, 5:46
- MIA: Rishard Matthews 46-yard pass from Ryan Tannehill, Andrew Franks XP failed, (BUF 34-14). Drive: 4 plays, 48 yards, 00:51
- BUF: Karlos Williams 41 yard run, Dan Carpenter XP good, (BUF 41-14). Drive: 2 plays, 44 yards, 1:10

Top passers

- BUF – Tyrod Taylor, 21/29, 277 yards, 3 TD
- MIA – Ryan Tannehill, 26/49, 297 yards, 2 TD, 3 INT

Top rushers

- BUF – Karlos Williams, 12 carries, 110 yards, TD
- MIA – Jonas Gray, 9 carries, 49 yards

Top receivers

- BUF – Charles Clay, 5 receptions, 82 yards, TD
- MIA – Rishard Matthews, 6 receptions, 113 yards, 2 TD

Top tacklers

- BUF – Corey Graham, 10 tackles
- MIA – Reshad Jones, 8 tackles

After leading 27-0, Dolphins quarterback Ryan Tannehill finally threw two touchdowns, but his three interceptions, one of which a pick-six returned by linebacker Preston Brown 43 yards for a touchdown, proved to be too much as the Bills improved to 2-1.

=== Week 4: vs. New York Giants ===
Week Four: New York Giants at Buffalo Bills – Game summary

| Quarter | 1 | 2 | 3 | 4 | Total |
|---|---|---|---|---|---|
| Giants | 9 | 7 | 0 | 8 | 24 |
| Bills | 3 | 0 | 0 | 7 | 10 |

at Ralph Wilson Stadium, Orchard Park, New York

- Date: October 4
- Game time: 1:00pm EDT
- Game weather: 60 °F (16 °C), mostly cloudy
- Game attendance: 70,677
- Referee: John Hussey
- TV announcers (Fox): Kenny Albert, Daryl Johnston and Laura Okmin
- Recap, Gamebook

Game information

First quarter

- NYG: Josh Brown 47-yard FG, (NYG 3-0). Drive: 8 plays, 35 yards, 3:11
- BUF: Dan Carpenter 51-yard FG, (TIE 3-3). Drive: 5 plays, 15 yards, 1:21
- NYG: Dwayne Harris 21-yard pass from Eli Manning, Josh Brown XP failed, (NYG 9-3). Drive: 2 plays, 32 yards, 00:37

Second quarter

- NYG: Rueben Randle 11-yard pass from Eli Manning, Josh Brown XP good, (NYG 16-3). Drive: 10 plays, 76 yards, 4:02

Third quarter

  - No scoring plays

Fourth quarter

- BUF: Karlos Williams 23-yard pass from Tyrod Taylor, Dan Carpenter XP good, (NYG 16-10). Drive: 3 plays, 43 yards, 00:54
- NYG: Rashard Jennings 51-yard pass from Eli Manning, Andre Williams run-2pt conversion good, (NYG 24-10). Drive: 5 plays, 72 yards, 1:59

Top passers

- NYG – Eli Manning, 20/35, 212 yards, 3 TD, INT
- BUF – Tyrod Taylor, 28/42, 274 yards, 1 TD, INT

Top rushers

- NYG – Rashad Jennings, 9 carries, 38 yards
- BUF – Karlos Williams, 18 carrries, 40 yards

Top receivers

- NYG – Rashard Jennings, 2 receptions, 54 yards, TD
- BUF – Charles Clay, 9 receptions, 111 yards

Top tacklers

- NYG – Kerry Wynn, 7 tackles
- BUF – Corey Graham, 8 tackles

With their third straight loss to the Giants dating back to 2007, the Bills dropped to 2-2.

=== Week 5: at Tennessee Titans ===
Week Five: Buffalo Bills at Tennessee Titans – Game summary

| Quarter | 1 | 2 | 3 | 4 | Total |
|---|---|---|---|---|---|
| Bills | 0 | 0 | 0 | 14 | 14 |
| Titans | 0 | 3 | 7 | 3 | 13 |

at Nissan Stadium, Nashville, Tennessee

- Date: October 11
- Game time: 1:00pm EDT/12:00pm CDT
- Game weather: 67 °F (19 °C), sunny
- Game attendance: 65,670
- Referee: Walt Anderson
- TV announcers (CBS): Andrew Catalon, Steve Beuerlein and Steve Tasker
- Recap, Gamebook

Game information

First quarter

- No scoring plays

Second quarter

- TEN: Ryan Succop 21-yard FG, (TEN 3-0). Drive: 13 plays, 62 yards, 7:39

Third quarter

- TEN: Antonio Andrews 1-yard run, Ryan Succop XP good, (TEN 10-0). Drive: 7 plays, 39 yards, 4:15
- BUF: Tyrod Taylor 22-yard run, Dan Carpenter XP good, (TEN 10-7). Drive: 9 plays, 80 yards, 5:31

Fourth quarter

- TEN: Ryan Succop 41-yard FG, (TEN 13-7). Drive: 13 plays, 72 yards, 6:44
- BUF: Chris Hogan 2-yard pass from Tyrod Taylor, Dan Carpenter XP good, (BUF 14-13). Drive: 8 plays, 80 yards, 4:11

Top passers

- BUF – Tyrod Taylor, 10/17, 109 yards, TD
- TEN – Marcus Mariota, 21/32, INT

Top rushers

- BUF – Tyrod Taylor, 8 carries, 76 yards, TD
- TEN – Marcus Mariota, 5 carries, 47 yards

Top receivers

- BUF – Chris Hogan, 3 receptions, TD
- TEN – Antonio Andrews, 3 receptions, 45 yards

Top tacklers

- BUF – Corey Graham, 8 tackles
- TEN – Avery Williamson, 7 tackles, 1 sack

With the win, the Bills improved to 3-2.

=== Week 6: vs. Cincinnati Bengals ===
Week Six: Cincinnati Bengals at Buffalo Bills – Game summary

| Quarter | 1 | 2 | 3 | 4 | Total |
|---|---|---|---|---|---|
| Bengals | 7 | 10 | 14 | 3 | 34 |
| Bills | 7 | 7 | 0 | 7 | 21 |

at Ralph Wilson Stadium, Orchard Park, New York

- Date: October 18
- Game time: 1:00pm EDT
- Game weather: 40 °F (4 °C), cloudy
- Game attendance: 69,593
- Referee: Clete Blakeman
- TV announcers (CBS): Spero Dedes and Solomon Wilcots
- Recap, Gamebook

Game information

First quarter

- BUF: EJ Manuel 2-yard run, Dan Carpenter XP good, (BUF 7-0). Drive: 11 plays, 80 yards, 5:39
- CIN: Jeremy Hills 13-yard pass from Andy Dalton, Mike Nugent XP good, (TIE 7-7). Drive: 7 plays, 49 yards, 2:43

Second quarter

- CIN: Giovani Bernard 17-yard run, Mike Nugent XP good, (CIN 14-7). Drive: 5 plays, 55 yards, 2:11
- CIN: Mike Nugent 47-yard FG, (CIN 17-7). Drive: 4 plays, 7 yards, 1:34
- BUF: Sammy Watkins 22-yard pass from EJ Manuel, Dan Carpenter XP good, (CIN 17-14). Drive: 14 plays, 86 yards, 6:55

Third quarter

- CIN: Marvin Jones 10 yard pass from Andy Dalton, Mike Nugent XP good, (CIN 24-14). Drive: 8 plays, 90 yards, 4:05
- CIN: Tyler Eifert 4-yard pass from Andy Dalton, Mike Nugent XP good, (CIN 31-14). Drive: 12 plays, 78 yards, 4:41

Fourth quarter

- CIN: Mike Nugent 39-yard FG, (CIN 34-14). Drive: 10 plays, 45 yards, 5:07
- BUF: LeSean McCoy 4-yard run, Dan Carpenter XP good, (CIN 34-21). Drive: 9 plays, 80 yards, 3:50

Top passers

- CIN – Andy Dalton, 22/33, 243 yards, 3 TD
- BUF – EJ Manuel, 28/42, 263 yards, TD, INT

Top rushers

- CIN – Jeremy Hill, 16 carries, 56 yards
- BUF – LeSean McCoy, 17 carries, 90 yards, TD

Top receivers

- CIN – Marvin Jones, 9 receptions, 95 yards, TD
- BUF – Charles Clay, 9 receptions, 62 yards

Top tacklers

- CIN – Reggie Nelson, 8 tackles
- BUF – Preston Brown, 7 tackles

With their third straight loss to the Bengals dating back to 2011, the Bills dropped to 3-3.

=== Week 7: at Jacksonville Jaguars ===
NFL International Series

Week Seven: Buffalo Bills at Jacksonville Jaguars – Game summary

| Quarter | 1 | 2 | 3 | 4 | Total |
|---|---|---|---|---|---|
| Bills | 3 | 10 | 0 | 18 | 31 |
| Jaguars | 0 | 27 | 0 | 7 | 34 |

at Wembley Stadium, London, England

- Date: October 25
- Game time: 1:30pm GMT/9:30am EDT
- Game weather: 48 °F (9 °C), sunny intervals
- Game attendance: 84,021
- Referee: Terry McAulay
- TV announcers (Yahoo! Screen, WIVB): Kevin Harlan, Rich Gannon and Jamie Erdahl
- Recap, Gamebook

Game information

First quarter

- BUF: Dan Carpenter 31-yard FG, (BUF 3-0). Drive: 7 plays, 43 yards, 2:38

Second quarter

- JAX: Allen Robinson 13-yard pass from Blake Bortles, Jason Myers XP good, (JAX 7-3). Drive: 7 plays, 73 yards, 3:08
- JAX: Chris Clemons 6 yard fumble return, Jason Myers XP good, (JAX 14-3).
- JAX: Telvin Smith 26-yard INT return, Jason Myers XP good, (JAX 21-3).
- JAX: T. J. Yeldon 28-yard run, Jason Myers XP failed, (JAX 27-3). Drive: 3 plays, 36 yards, 1:30
- BUF: Robert Woods 16-yard pass from EJ Manuel, Dan Carpenter XP good, (JAX 27-10). Drive: 12 plays, 85 yards, 5:39
- BUF: Dan Carpenter 38-yard FG, (JAX 27-13). Drive: 7 plays, 30 yards, 1:30

Third quarter

- No scoring plays

Fourth quarter

- BUF: Dan Carpenter 26-yard FG, (JAX 27-16). Drive: 14 plays, 91 yards, 5:40
- BUF: Marcus Easley 58-yard pass from EJ Manuel, LeSean McCoy-run 2pt conversion good, (JAX 27-24). Drive: 2 plays, 52 yards, 00:42
- BUF: Corey Graham 44-yard INT return, Dan Carpenter XP good, (BUF 31-27).
- JAX: Allen Hurns 31-yard pass from Blake Bortles, Jason Myers XP good, (JAX 34-31). Drive: 7 plays, 84 yards, 3:05

Top passers

- BUF – EJ Manuel, 24/42, 298 yards, 2 TD, 2 INT
- JAX – Blake Bortles, 13/29, 182 yards, 2 TD, INT

Top rushers

- BUF – LeSean McCoy, 18 carries, 68 yards
- JAX – T. J. Yeldon, 20 carries, 115 yards, TD

Top receivers

- BUF – Robert Woods, 9 receptions, 84 yards, TD
- JAX – Allen Robinson, 6 receptions, 98 yards, TD

Top tacklers

- BUF – Corey Graham, 8 tackles, INT
- JAX – Telvin Smith, 8 tackles, INT

This was the Bills’ first game in London since a preseason game in 1991. Sadly, with the stunning loss, the Bills dropped to 3-4 heading into the bye week, marking the first time they had been under .500 all season.

=== Week 9: vs. Miami Dolphins ===
Week Nine: Miami Dolphins at Buffalo Bills – Game summary

| Quarter | 1 | 2 | 3 | 4 | Total |
|---|---|---|---|---|---|
| Dolphins | 0 | 7 | 7 | 3 | 17 |
| Bills | 9 | 10 | 7 | 7 | 33 |

at Ralph Wilson Stadium, Orchard Park, New York

- Date: November 8
- Game time: 1:00pm ET
- Game weather: 49 °F (9 °C), sunny with some clouds
- Game attendance: 70,214
- Referee: Carl Cheffers
- TV announcers (CBS): Spero Dedes and Solomon Wilcots
- Recap, Gamebook

Game information

First quarter

- BUF: Ryan Tannehill fumble out of bounds in end zone for safety, (BUF 2-0).
- BUF: LeSean McCoy 48-yard run, Dan Carpenter XP good, (BUF 9-0). Drive: 5 plays, 80 yards, 2:58

Second quarter

- MIA: Lamar Miller 1-yard run, Andrew Franks XP good, (BUF 9-7). Drive: 9 plays, 85 yards, 4:25
- BUF: Dan Carpenter 43-yard FG, (BUF 12–7). Drive: 8 plays, 47 yards, 4:20
- BUF: Karlos Williams 11-yard run, Dan Carpenter XP good, (BUF 19-7). Drive: 4 plays, 84 yards, 2:07

Third quarter

- MIA: Lamar Miller 1-yard run, Andrew Franks XP good, (BUF 19-14). Drive: 9 plays, 80 yards, 4:55
- BUF: Sammy Watkins 44-yard pass from Tyrod Taylor, Dan Carpenter XP good, (BUF 26-14). Drive: 3 plays, 40 yards, 2:12

Fourth quarter

- BUF: Karlos Williams 38-yard run, Dan Carpenter XP good, (BUF 33-14). Drive: 10 plays, 80 yards, 6:16
- MIA: Andrew Franks 48-yard FG, (BUF 33-17). Drive: 9 plays, 63 yards, 4:42

Top passers

- MIA – Ryan Tannehill, 27/36, 309 yards
- BUF – Tyrod Taylor, 11/12, 181 yards, TD

Top rushers

- MIA – Lamar Miller, 12 carries, 44 yards, 2 TD
- BUF – LeSean McCoy, 16 carries, 112 yards, TD

Top receivers

- MIA – Lamar Miller, 7 receptions, 97 yards
- BUF – Sammy Watkins, 8 receptions, 168 yards, TD

Top tacklers

- MIA – Brent Grimes, 7 tackles
- BUF – Ronald Darby, 10 tackles

With the win, not only did the Bills improve to 4-4, but they swept Miami for the first time since 2013.

=== Week 10: at New York Jets ===
Week Ten: Buffalo Bills at New York Jets – Game summary

| Quarter | 1 | 2 | 3 | 4 | Total |
|---|---|---|---|---|---|
| Bills | 0 | 12 | 10 | 0 | 22 |
| Jets | 3 | 0 | 7 | 7 | 17 |

at MetLife Stadium, East Rutherford, New Jersey

- Date: November 12
- Game time: 8:25pm ET
- Game weather: 60 °F (16 °C), cloudy
- Game attendance: 78,160
- Referee: Brad Allen
- TV announcers (NFLN): Jim Nantz, Phil Simms and Tracy Wolfson
- Recap, Gamebook

Game information

First quarter

- NYJ: Randy Bullock 29-yard field goal, (NYJ 3-0). Drive: 10 plays, 76 yards, 4:57

Second quarter

- BUF: Dan Carpenter 47-yard field goal, (TIE 3-3). Drive: 4 plays, 5 yards, 1:28
- BUF: Duke Williams 19-yard fumble return, Dan Carpenter XP failed, (BUF 9-3).
- BUF: Dan Carpenter 41-yard field goal, (BUF 12-3). Drive: 12 plays, 57 yards, 4:47

Third quarter

- BUF: Karlos Williams 26-yard pass from Tyrod Taylor, Dan Carpenter XP good, (BUF 19-3). Drive: 7 plays, 80 yards, 3:45
- BUF: Dan Carpenter 29-yard field goal, (BUF 22-3). Drive: 5 plays, 12 yards, 2:24
- NYJ: Brandon Marshall 14-yard pass from Ryan Fitzpatrick, Randy Bullock XP good, (BUF 22-10). Drive: 8 plays, 80 yards, 4:03

Fourth quarter

- NYJ: Eric Decker 31-yard pass from Ryan Fitzpatrick, Randy Bullock XP good, (BUF 22-17). Drive: 9 plays, 69 yards, 2:51

Top passers

- BUF – Tyrod Taylor, 17/27, 158 yards, TD
- NYJ – Ryan Fitzpatrick, 15/34, 193 yards, 2 TD, 2 INT

Top rushers

- BUF – LeSean McCoy, 19 carries, 112 yards
- NYJ – Chris Ivory, 18 carries, 99 yards

Top receivers

- BUF – Charles Clay, 5 receptions, 52 yards
- NYJ – Eric Decker, 6 receptions, 85 yards, TD

Top tacklers

- BUF – Nigel Bradham, 4 tackles – Bacarri Rambo, 2 tackles, INT, FF
- NYJ – Demario Davis, 6 tackels, 1 sack

Rex Ryan made his return to MetLife Stadium for the first time since the Jets fired him after the 2014 season. The Bills wore their red Nike “color rush” uniforms. With 0:18 remaining, Jets quarterback Ryan Fitzpatrick attempted a comeback, but a game-saving interception by Bills safety Bacarri Rambo sealed the 22-17 victory over the Jets. With the win, the Bills improved to 5-4.

This was the debut for NFL Color Rush uniforms, with the Bills in all red and the Jets in all kelly green. The uniforms were indistinguishable to those with red-green color blindness, creating controversy.

=== Week 11: at New England Patriots ===
Week Eleven: Buffalo Bills at New England Patriots – Game summary

| Quarter | 1 | 2 | 3 | 4 | Total |
|---|---|---|---|---|---|
| Bills | 0 | 3 | 7 | 3 | 13 |
| Patriots | 3 | 7 | 10 | 0 | 20 |

at Gillette Stadium, Foxborough, Massachusetts

- Date: November 23
- Game time: 8:30pm ET
- Game weather: 29 °F (−2 °C), clear and cold
- Game attendance: 66,829
- Referee: Gene Steratore
- TV announcers (ESPN): Mike Tirico, Jon Gruden and Lisa Salters
- Recap, Gamebook

Game information

First quarter

- NE: Stephen Gostkowski 35-yard FG, (NE 3-0). Drive: 11 plays, 49 yards, 5:56

Second quarter

- BUF: Dan Carpenter 52-yard FG, (3-3). Drive: 11 plays, 51 yards, 5:36
- NE: James White 20-yard pass from Tom Brady, Stephen Gostkowski XP good (NE 10-3). Drive: 6 plays, 62 yards, 0:33

Third quarter

- BUF: LeSean McCoy 27-yard run, Dan Carpenter XP good (10-10). Drive: 5 plays, 56 yards, 2:06
- NE: James White 6-yard run, Stephen Gostkowski XP good (NE 17-10). Drive: 6 plays, 64 yards, 2:04
- NE: Stephen Gostkowski 35-yard FG, (NE 20-10) Drive: 6 plays, 14 yards, 1:50

Fourth quarter

- BUF: Dan Carpenter 33-yard FG, (NE 20-13). Drive: 9 plays, 60 yards, 4:05

Top passers

- BUF – Tyrod Taylor, 20-36, 233 yards
- NE – Tom Brady, 20-39, 277 yards, TD, INT

Top rushers

- BUF – LeSean McCoy, 20 attempts, 82 yards, TD
- NE – LeGarrette Blount, 16 attempts, 56 yards

Top receivers

- BUF – Chris Hogan, 6 receptions, 95 yards
- NE – Danny Amendola, 9 receptions, 117 yards

Top tacklers

- BUF – Preston Brown, 5 solo, 4 assist
- NE – Logan Ryan, 7 solo, 2 assist

With yet another close loss, the Bills dropped to 5-5.

=== Week 12: at Kansas City Chiefs ===
Week Twelve: Buffalo Bills at Kansas City Chiefs – Game summary

| Quarter | 1 | 2 | 3 | 4 | Total |
|---|---|---|---|---|---|
| Bills | 10 | 6 | 6 | 0 | 22 |
| Chiefs | 0 | 14 | 10 | 6 | 30 |

at Arrowhead Stadium, Kansas City, Missouri

- Date: November 29
- Game time: 1:00pm ET/12:00pm CT
- Game weather: 35 °F (2 °C), cloudy and rainy
- Game attendance: 72,493
- Referee: Terry McAulay
- TV announcers (CBS): Kevin Harlan and Rich Gannon
- Recap, Gamebook

Game information

First quarter

Second quarter

Third quarter

Fourth quarter

Top passers

- BUF – Tyrod Taylor, 21-38, 291 yards, 3 TD
- KC – Alex Smith, 19-30, 255 yards, 2 TD

Top rushers

- BUF – LeSean McCoy, 19 attempts, 70 yards
- KC – Spencer Ware, 19 attempts, 114 yards, TD

Top receivers

- BUF – Sammy Watkins, 6 receptions, 158 yards, 2 TD
- KC – Jeremy Maclin, 9 receptions, 160 yards, TD

Top tacklers

- BUF – Marcell Dareus, 6 solo
- KC – Josh Mauga, 9 solo, 1 TFL

With the loss, the Bills dropped to 5-6.

=== Week 13: vs. Houston Texans ===
Week Thirteen: Houston Texans at Buffalo Bills – Game summary

| Quarter | 1 | 2 | 3 | 4 | Total |
|---|---|---|---|---|---|
| Texans | 6 | 7 | 0 | 8 | 21 |
| Bills | 7 | 14 | 0 | 9 | 30 |

at Ralph Wilson Stadium, Orchard Park, New York

- Date: December 6
- Game time: 1:00pm ET
- Game weather: 47 °F (8 °C), partly cloudy
- Game attendance: 68,544
- Referee: Tony Corrente
- TV announcers (CBS): Spero Dedes and Solomon Wilcots
- Recap, Gamebook

Game information

First quarter

Second quarter

Third quarter

Fourth quarter

Top passers

- HOU – Brian Hoyer, 26-43, 293 yards, 3 TD, INT
- BUF – Tyrod Taylor, 11-21, 211 yards, 3 TD

Top rushers

- HOU – Chris Polk, 12 attempts, 61 yards
- BUF – LeSean McCoy, 21 attempts, 112 yards

Top receivers

- HOU – Cecil Shorts III, 6 receptions, 91 yards
- BUF – Sammy Watkins, 3 receptions, 109 yards, TD

Top tacklers

- HOU – Kareem Jackson, 5 solo, 1 assist
- BUF – Preston Brown, 5 solo, 4 assist

With the win, not only did the Bills improve to 6-6 (3-1 against the AFC South), they remained in the wild card race. It's also the Bills first win against the Texans since 2006.

=== Week 14: at Philadelphia Eagles ===
Week Fourteen: Buffalo Bills at Philadelphia Eagles – Game summary

| Quarter | 1 | 2 | 3 | 4 | Total |
|---|---|---|---|---|---|
| Bills | 7 | 3 | 10 | 0 | 20 |
| Eagles | 7 | 10 | 3 | 3 | 23 |

at Lincoln Financial Field, Philadelphia, Pennsylvania

- Date: December 13
- Game time: 1:00pm ET
- Game weather: 66 °F (19 °C), partly cloudy
- Game attendance: 69,596
- Referee: Ed Hochuli
- TV announcers (CBS): Spero Dedes and Solomon Wilcots
- Recap, Gamebook

Game information

First quarter

Second quarter

Third quarter

Fourth quarter

Top passers

- BUF – Tyrod Taylor, 19-36, 268 yards, TD, INT
- PHI – Sam Bradford, 23-38, 247 yards, TD, INT

Top rushers

- BUF – LeSean McCoy, 20 attempts, 74 yards
- PHI – Darren Sproles, 7 attempts, 41 yards, TD

Top receivers

- BUF – Robert Woods, 5 receptions, 106 yards
- PHI – Zach Ertz, 5 receptions, 98 yards

Top tacklers

- BUF – Corey Graham, 8 solo, 1 assist
- PHI – Fletcher Cox, 7 solo, 1 assist, 1 sack, 2 TFL

LeSean McCoy made his return to Philadelphia for the first time since the Eagles traded him in the offseason. McCoy was seen kissing the Eagles logo, but did not stick around to interact with his former teammates or coach Chip Kelly.

=== Week 15: at Washington Redskins ===
Week Fifteen: Buffalo Bills at Washington Redskins – Game summary

| Quarter | 1 | 2 | 3 | 4 | Total |
|---|---|---|---|---|---|
| Bills | 0 | 0 | 0 | 25 | 25 |
| Redskins | 7 | 14 | 7 | 7 | 35 |

at FedExField, Landover, Maryland

- Date: December 20
- Game time: 1:00pm ET
- Game weather: 43 °F (6 °C), sunny
- Game attendance: 80,124
- Referee: Clete Blakeman
- TV announcers (Fox): Kenny Albert, Daryl Johnston and Laura Okmin
- Recap, Gamebook

Game information

First quarter

Second quarter

Third quarter

Fourth quarter

Top passers

- BUF –
- WAS –

Top rushers

- BUF –
- WAS –

Top receivers

- BUF –
- WAS –

Top tacklers

- BUF –
- WAS –

With the loss, not only did the Bills drop to 6-8, but they were officially eliminated from playoff contention for the 16th consecutive season.

=== Week 16: vs. Dallas Cowboys ===
Week Sixteen: Dallas Cowboys at Buffalo Bills – Game summary

| Quarter | 1 | 2 | 3 | 4 | Total |
|---|---|---|---|---|---|
| Cowboys | 3 | 3 | 0 | 0 | 6 |
| Bills | 6 | 0 | 3 | 7 | 16 |

at Ralph Wilson Stadium, Orchard Park, New York

- Date: December 27
- Game time: 1:00pm ET
- Game weather: 39 °F (4 °C), rain showers
- Game attendance: 70,172
- Referee: Jeff Triplette
- TV announcers (Fox): Kenny Albert, Daryl Johnston and Laura Okmin
- Recap, Gamebook

Game information

First quarter

- DAL – Dan Bailey 46-yard field goal, 9:45. Cowboys 3–0. Drive: 11 plays, 52 yards, 5:19.
- BUF – Karlos Williams 1-yard run (kick failed), 0:51. Bills 6–3. Drive: 5 plays, 60 yards, 1:57.

Second quarter

- DAL – Dan Bailey 22-yard field goal, 5:29. Tied 6–6. Drive: 6 plays, 40 yards, 2:51.

Third quarter

- BUF – Dan Carpenter 32-yard field goal, 6:21. Bills 9–6. Drive: 10 plays, 56 yards, 5:37.

Fourth quarter

- BUF – Mike Gillislee 50-yard run (Dan Carpenter kick), 2:34. Bills 16–6. Drive: 9 plays, 92 yards, 4:28.

Top passers

- DAL – Kellen Moore – 13/31, 186 yards, INT
- BUF – Tyrod Taylor – 13/18, 179 yards, INT

Top rushers

- DAL – Darren McFadden – 19 rushes, 99 yards
- BUF – Mike Gillislee – 9 rushes, 93 yards, TD

Top receivers

- DAL – Brice Butler – 4 receptions, 74 yards
- BUF – Sammy Watkins – 5 receptions, 84 yards

Top tacklers

- DAL – Sean Lee – 11 tackles, 4 assists (0.5 sacks)
- BUF – Corey Graham – 8 tackles, 3 assists

With the win, the Bills improved to 7-8 heading into the season finale. Buffalo finished 2-2 against the NFC East.

=== Week 17: vs. New York Jets ===
Week Seventeen: New York Jets at Buffalo Bills – Game summary

| Quarter | 1 | 2 | 3 | 4 | Total |
|---|---|---|---|---|---|
| Jets | 0 | 7 | 10 | 0 | 17 |
| Bills | 7 | 9 | 3 | 3 | 22 |

at Ralph Wilson Stadium, Orchard Park, New York

- Date: January 3, 2016
- Game time: 1:00pm ET
- Game weather: 35 °F (2 °C), cloudy
- Game attendance: 68,670
- Referee: Walt Anderson
- TV announcers (CBS): Ian Eagle, Dan Fouts and Evan Washburn
- Recap, Gamebook

Game information

First quarter

- BUF – Tyrod Taylor 18-yard run (Dan Carpenter kick), 5:55. Bills 7–0. Drive: 3 plays, 25 yards, 1:19.

Second quarter

- BUF – Karlos Williams 2-yard run (kick failed), 13:02. Bills 13–0. Drive: 13 plays, 70 yards, 6:21.
- NYJ – Brandon Marshall 17-yard pass from Ryan Fitzpatrick (Randy Bullock kick), 9:42. Bills 13–7. Drive: 3 plays, 60 yards, 1:26.
- BUF – Dan Carpenter 20-yard field goal, 0:27. Bills 16–7. Drive: 15 plays, 70 yards, 9:16.

Third quarter

- NYJ – Randy Bullock 39-yard field goal, 13:24. Bills 16–10. Drive: 4 plays, 2 yards, 0:49.
- BUF – Dan Carpenter 37-yard field goal, 5:05. Bills 19–10. Drive: 14 plays, 66 yards, 8:19.
- NYJ – Eric Decker 21-yard pass from Ryan Fitzpatrick (Randy Bullock kick), 1:15. Bills 19–17. Drive: 11 plays, 77 yards, 3:52.

Fourth quarter

- BUF – Dan Carpenter 42-yard field goal, 3:53. Bills 22–17. Drive: 13 plays, 56 yards, 6:54.

Top passers

- NYJ – Ryan Fitzpatrick – 16/37, 181 yards, 2 TD, 3 INT
- BUF – Tyrod Taylor – 18/28, 182 yards

Top rushers

- NYJ – Chris Ivory – 6 rushes, 81 yards
- BUF – Tyrod Taylor – 10 rushes, 51 yards, TD

Top receivers

- NYJ – Brandon Marshall – 8 receptions, 126 yards, TD
- BUF – Sammy Watkins – 11 receptions, 136 yards

Top tacklers

- NYJ – David Harris, 10 total, 4 assists, 2 sacks, 2 TFL
- BUF – Corey Graham, 6 solo, 1 TFL

Prior to the game, the team called for paid volunteers to help shovel snow out of Ralph Wilson Stadium. Former Bills quarterback Ryan Fitzpatrick made his first return to Buffalo since being cut after the 2012 season, hoping to clinch a playoff spot for his new team with a win. Despite the Jets setting various team records, the Bills ultimately pulled out a win to close the season at 8-8 for the first time since 2002 in their final regular season game before Ralph Wilson Stadium was renamed New Era Field the following summer, not only keeping the Jets out of the playoffs for a fifth straight year, but helping the Pittsburgh Steelers reach the playoffs. As a thank you gift of sorts, the Steelers sent the Bills a care package of Primanti Brothers sandwiches. With the win, the Bills finished 4-2 against the AFC East and 5-3 at home.

== Standings ==
=== Division ===
AFC East
| | W | L | T | PCT | DIV | CONF | PF | PA | STK |
|---|---|---|---|---|---|---|---|---|---|
| ^{(2)} New England Patriots | 12 | 4 | 0 | .750 | 4–2 | 9–3 | 465 | 315 | L2 |
| New York Jets | 10 | 6 | 0 | .625 | 3–3 | 7–5 | 387 | 314 | L1 |
| Buffalo Bills | 8 | 8 | 0 | .500 | 4–2 | 7–5 | 379 | 359 | W2 |
| Miami Dolphins | 6 | 10 | 0 | .375 | 1–5 | 4–8 | 310 | 389 | W1 |

=== Conference ===
AFC
| # | Team | Division | W | L | T | PCT | DIV | CONF | SOS | SOV | STK |
|---|---|---|---|---|---|---|---|---|---|---|---|
Division Leaders
| 1 (Note: Denver finished ahead of New England and Cincinnati for the No. 1 seed based on head-to-head sweep. New England finished ahead of Cincinnati for the No. 2 seed based on record vs. common opponents — New England's cumulative record against Buffalo, Denver, Houston and Pittsburgh was 4–1, while Cincinnati's cumulative record against the same four teams was 2–3.) | Denver Broncos | West | 12 | 4 | 0 | .750 | 4–2 | 8–4 | .500 | .479 | W2 |
| 2 | New England Patriots | East | 12 | 4 | 0 | .750 | 4–2 | 9–3 | .473 | .448 | L2 |
| 3 | Cincinnati Bengals | North | 12 | 4 | 0 | .750 | 5–1 | 9–3 | .477 | .406 | W1 |
| 4 | Houston Texans | South | 9 | 7 | 0 | .563 | 5–1 | 7–5 | .496 | .410 | W3 |
Wild Cards
| 5 | Kansas City Chiefs | West | 11 | 5 | 0 | .688 | 5–1 | 10–2 | .496 | .432 | W10 |
| 6 (Note: Pittsburgh finished ahead of the New York Jets for the No. 6 seed and qualified for the last playoff spot based on record vs. common opponents — Pittsburgh's cumulative record against Cleveland, Indianapolis, New England and Oakland was 4–1, while the Jets' cumulative record against the same four teams was 3–2.) | Pittsburgh Steelers | North | 10 | 6 | 0 | .625 | 3–3 | 7–5 | .504 | .463 | W1 |
Did not qualify for the postseason
| 7 | New York Jets | East | 10 | 6 | 0 | .625 | 3–3 | 7–5 | .441 | .388 | L1 |
| 8 (Note: Buffalo finished ahead of Indianapolis based on head-to-head victory.) | Buffalo Bills | East | 8 | 8 | 0 | .500 | 4–2 | 7–5 | .508 | .438 | W2 |
| 9 | Indianapolis Colts | South | 8 | 8 | 0 | .500 | 4–2 | 6–6 | .500 | .406 | W2 |
| 10 | Oakland Raiders | West | 7 | 9 | 0 | .438 | 3–3 | 7–5 | .512 | .366 | L1 |
| 11 | Miami Dolphins | East | 6 | 10 | 0 | .375 | 1–5 | 4–8 | .469 | .469 | W2 |
| 12 (Note: Jacksonville finished ahead of Baltimore based on head-to-head victory.) | Jacksonville Jaguars | South | 5 | 11 | 0 | .313 | 2–4 | 5–7 | .473 | .375 | L3 |
| 13 | Baltimore Ravens | North | 5 | 11 | 0 | .313 | 3–3 | 4–8 | .508 | .425 | L1 |
| 14 | San Diego Chargers | West | 4 | 12 | 0 | .250 | 0–6 | 3–9 | .527 | .328 | L2 |
| 15 (Note: Cleveland finished ahead of Tennessee based on head-to-head victory.) | Cleveland Browns | North | 3 | 13 | 0 | .188 | 1–5 | 2–10 | .531 | .271 | L3 |
| 16 | Tennessee Titans | South | 3 | 13 | 0 | .188 | 1–5 | 1–11 | .492 | .375 | L4 |
Tiebreakers (Note: When breaking ties for three or more teams under the NFL's rules, they are first broken within divisions, then comparing only the highest ranked remaining team from each division.)
