= Jollyville, Texas =

- CDP
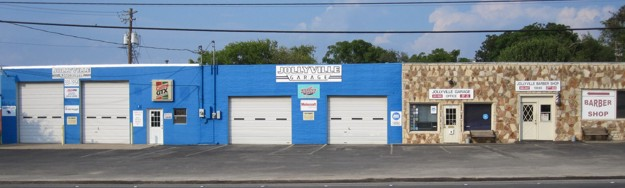
- Boundaries of Jollyville, Texas
- Coordinates: 30°27′12″N 97°45′45″W
- Country: United States
- State: Texas
- Counties: Williamson, Travis

Area
  - Total: 5.9 sq mi (15.3 km^{2})
  - Land: 5.9 sq mi (15.3 km^{2})
  - Water: 0 sq mi (0.0 km^{2})
- Elevation: 869 ft (265 m)

Population (2010)
  - Total: 16,151
  - Density: 2,730/sq mi (1,060/km^{2})
- Time zone: UTC-6 (Central (CST))
  - Summer (DST): UTC-5 (CDT)
- ZIP code: 78729
- Area code: 512
- FIPS code: 48-37936
- GNIS feature ID: 2408451

Jollyville is a neighborhood in the northern part of Austin, Texas, United States. In 2010 it was a census-designated place (CDP) in Travis and Williamson counties, but has since been annexed by Austin. The population of the CDP was 16,151 at the 2010 census.

== History ==
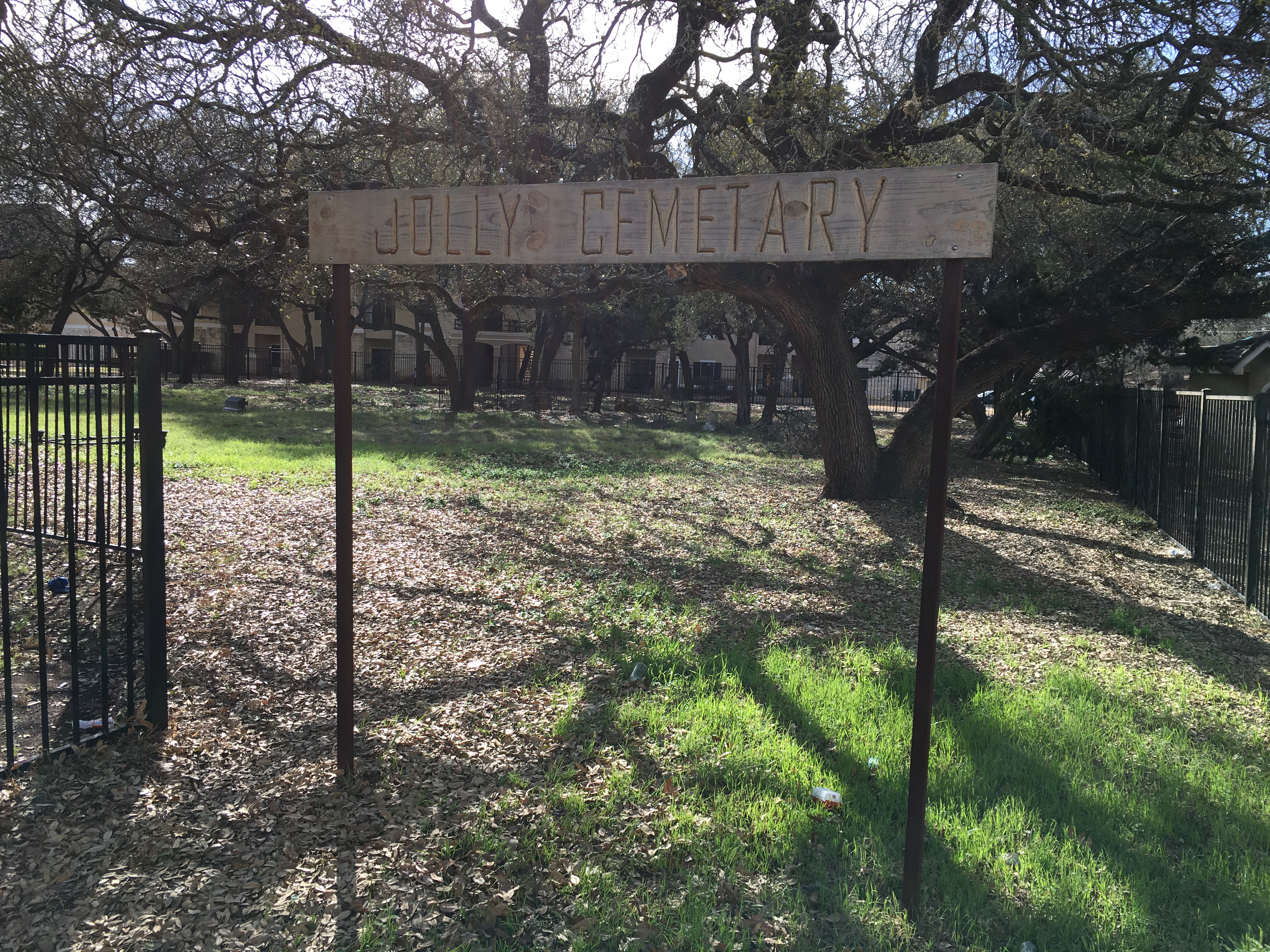
Jolly Cemetery in Williamson County, Texas

The area was first settled by Henry Rhodes after obtaining a land grant in 1841 of about 1,000 acres (4 km^{2}) from the Republic of Texas. The name, however, comes from a later settler, Confederate general John G. (possibly Grey, but no proof for middle name exist) Jolly, who purchased 160 acres (65 ha) in 1866. John and his wife, Nancy Isabell (Guill) Jolly, operated a blacksmith shop and store. The Jollys donated land for a school and the cemetery in which they were eventually buried. Jollyville remained lightly settled for decades; only twenty families lived in the area in 1960. Eventually, the growth of nearby Austin led to the development of Jollyville as a suburban community.

== Geography ==
According to the United States Census Bureau, the CDP has a total area of 5.9 sq mi (15 km^{2}), all land.

== Demographics ==
Historical population
Census	Pop.	Note	%±
1990	15,206		—
2000	15,813		4.0%
2010	16,151		2.1%

At the 2000 census, there were 15,813 people, 5,897 households, and 4,145 families living in the CDP. The population density was 2,682 inhabitants per square mile (1,036/km^{2}). There were 5,993 housing units at an average density of 1,016.4 per square mile (392.4/km^{2}). The racial makeup of the area was 79.81% White, 4.69% African American, 0.31% Native American, 8.52% Asian, 0.02% Pacific Islander, 4.36% from other races, and 2.28% from two or more races. 11.43% of the population were Hispanic or Latino of any race.

Of the 5,897 households 42.2% had children under the age of 18 living with them, 57.2% were married couples living together, 9.5% had a female householder with no husband present, and 29.7% were non-families. 20.5% of households were one person and 1.6% had someone living alone who was 65 or older. The average household size was 2.68 and the average family size was 3.17.

The age distribution was 28.7% under the age of 18, 8.4% from 18 to 24, 41.3% from 25 to 44, 18.7% from 45 to 64, and 3.0% 65 or older. The median age was 32 years. For every 100 females, there were 99.8 males. For every 100 females age 18 and over, there were 98.7 males.

The median household income was $66,999 and the median family income was $74,851. Males had a median income of $50,048 versus $32,004 for females. The per capita income for the CDP was $28,113. 2.7% of the population and 2.2% of families were living below the poverty line, including 1.7% of those under the age of 18 and 6.2% of those 65 and older.

== Climate ==
The climate in this area is characterized by hot, humid summers and generally mild to cool winters. According to the Köppen Climate Classification system, Jollyville has a humid subtropical climate, abbreviated "Cfa" on climate maps.

== Education ==
Jollyville is within the Round Rock Independent School District.

Four elementary schools serve sections of the CDP: Forest North, Jollyville, Live Oak, and Pond Springs. Residents are divided between Deerpark Middle School and Pearson Ranch Middle School. All residents are zoned to McNeil High School.

Previously all residents were zoned to Deerpark Middle School.
