= Bacarri Rambo =

American football player (born 1990)

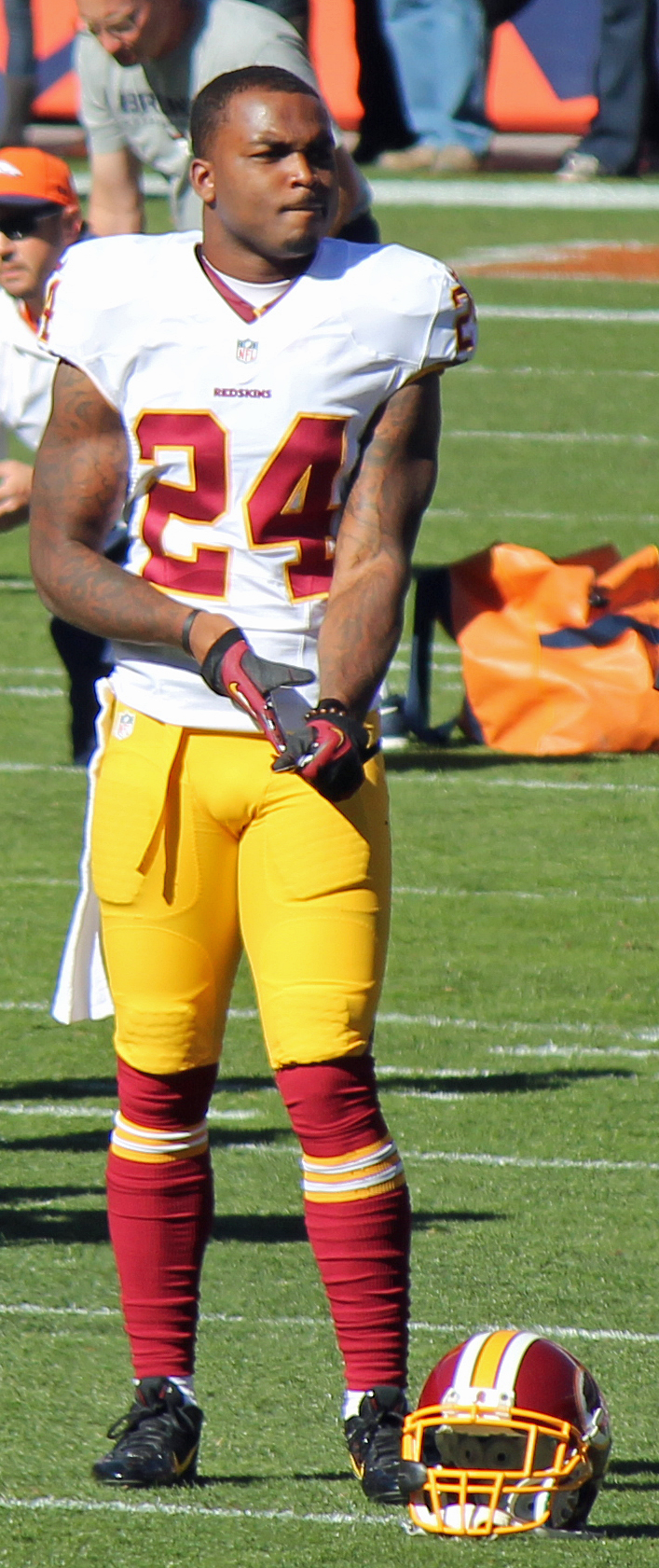
- Rambo with the Washington Redskins in 2013

No. 24, 30
- Position: Safety

Personal information
- Born: June 27, 1990 (age 36); Donalsonville, Georgia, U.S.
- Listed height: 6 ft 0 in (1.83 m)
- Listed weight: 211 lb (96 kg)

Career information
- High school: Seminole County (Donalsonville)
- College: Georgia (2008–2012)
- NFL draft: 2013: 6th round, 191st overall pick

Career history
- Washington Redskins (2013–2014); Buffalo Bills (2014–2015); Miami Dolphins (2016); Buffalo Bills (2017)*
- * Offseason or practice squad member only

Awards and highlights
- First-team All-American (2011); First-team All-SEC (2011); Second-team All-SEC (2012)

Career NFL statistics
- Total tackles: 151
- Sacks: 2.0
- Forced fumbles: 3
- Pass deflections: 11
- Interceptions: 4
- Stats at Pro Football Reference

Bacarri Jamon Rambo (born June 27, 1990) is an American former professional football player who was a safety in the National Football League (NFL). He played college football for the Georgia Bulldogs, earning first-team All-American honors in 2011. He was selected by the Washington Redskins in the sixth round of the 2013 NFL draft.

== College career ==
Rambo played college football at the University of Georgia. Rambo was named an All-American by Scout.com as a junior in 2011.

== Professional career ==
Pre-draft measurables
Height	Weight	Arm length	Hand span	40-yard dash	10-yard split	20-yard split	20-yard shuttle	Three-cone drill	Vertical jump	Broad jump	Bench press
6 ft 0 1/2 in (1.84 m)	211 lb (96 kg)	31 in (0.79 m)	9 1/4 in (0.23 m)	4.53 s	1.56 s	2.60 s	4.26 s	6.94 s	34.5 in (0.88 m)	9 ft 9 in (2.97 m)	17 reps
All values from NFL Combine/Pro Day

=== Washington Redskins ===
Rambo was selected by the Washington Redskins in the sixth round (191st overall) of the 2013 NFL draft. He signed a four-year contract worth roughly $430,788 per year on May 13, 2013. At the start of season, he was named the starting free safety. Due to his poor performance in the first two games, he not only lost his starting position, but was benched for several games. He returned to the field in Week 8 against the Denver Broncos due to the suspension of Brandon Meriweather. As a rookie, he finished with one sack and 43 total tackles. The Redskins waived Rambo on September 16, 2014.

=== Buffalo Bills (first stint) ===
Rambo signed with the Buffalo Bills on November 17, 2014, after the Bills had placed cornerback Leodis McKelvin on injured reserve. Rambo had two interceptions off of Green Bay Packers quarterback Aaron Rodgers on December 14, 2014, in Week 15. He appeared in six games in the 2014 season.

On November 12, 2015, Rambo contributed significantly during a Thursday night win against the New York Jets. Rambo forced two fumbles, one of which was returned by Duke Williams for a touchdown, the other recovered by Rambo himself. Rambo also had the game-sealing interception off of Ryan Fitzpatrick with less than a minute remaining in the 22–17 win. As a result of his performance in Week 10, Rambo was named as the AFC Defensive Player of the Week. He appeared in 15 games and started eight in the 2015 season. He recorded one sack, 62 total tackles, one interception, six passes defended, and two forced fumbles. He became a free agent at the end of the season.

=== Miami Dolphins ===
On October 25, 2016, Rambo was signed by the Miami Dolphins. In the Week 14 win over the Arizona Cardinals, he recorded his fourth career interception against quarterback Carson Palmer. He appeared in nine games and started five in the 2016 season. He finished with 42 total tackles, one interception, and three passes defensed.

=== Buffalo Bills (second stint) ===
On July 25, 2017, Rambo signed with the Bills. On August 29, Rambo was released by the Bills.

=== NFL statistics ===
Year	Team	GP	COMB	TOTAL	AST	SACK	FF	FR	FR YDS	INT	IR YDS	AVG IR	LNG	TD	PD
2013	WSH	11	43	32	11	1.0	0	0	0	0	0	0	0	0	0
2014	WSH	2	2	1	1	0.0	0	0	0	0	0	0	0	0	0
2014	BUF	4	2	1	1	0.0	0	0	0	2	44	22	28	0	2
2015	BUF	15	62	46	16	1.0	3	1	0	1	0	0	0	0	6
2016	MIA	9	42	25	17	0.0	0	0	0	1	17	17	17	0	3
Career		41	151	105	46	2.0	3	1	0	4	61	15	28	0	11
