= A. J. Abrams =

American basketball player

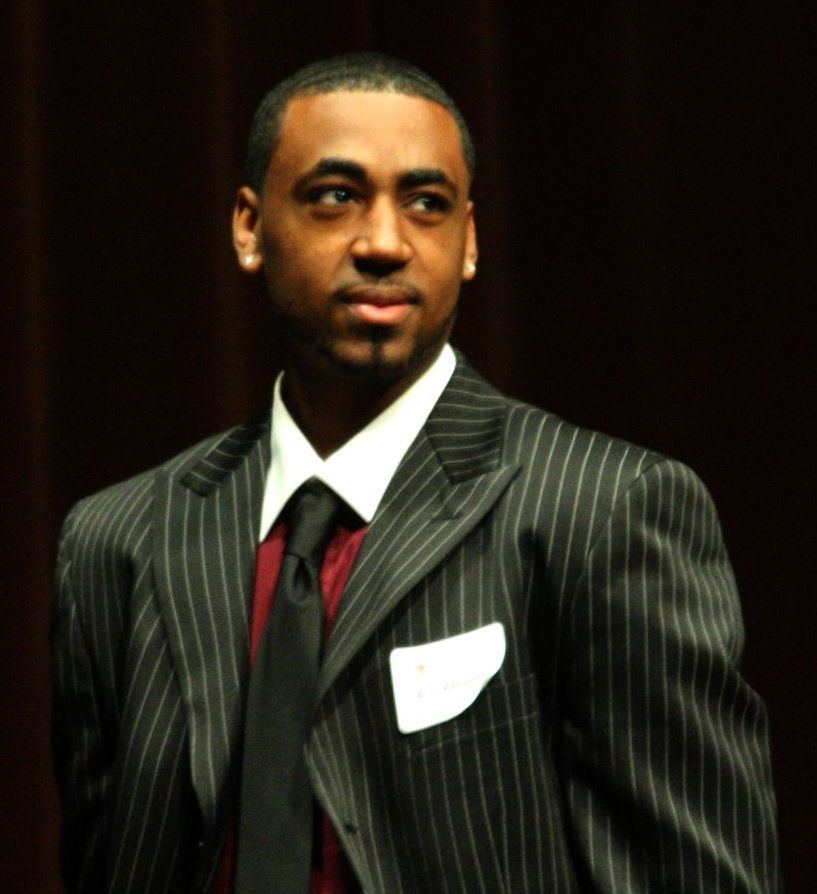
- Abrams with the University of Texas.

Personal information
- Born: October 16, 1986 (age 40) Sherman, Texas, U.S.
- Listed height: 5 ft 11 in (1.80 m)
- Listed weight: 186 lb (84 kg)

Career information
- High school: McNeil (Round Rock, Texas)
- College: Texas (2005–2009)
- NBA draft: 2009: undrafted
- Playing career: 2009–2012
- Position: Point guard
- Number: 8

Career history
- 2009–2010: Trikala 2000
- 2010–2011: Scaligera Basket Verona
- 2011–2012: ČEZ Nymburk

Career highlights
- Czech NBL champion (2012); Czech Cup winner (2012); Second-team All-Big 12 (2009)

Adrian Glenn Abrams Jr. (born October 16, 1986) is an American former professional basketball player.

== High school career ==
Abrams went to Deerpark Middle School and McNeil High School in Round Rock, Texas, where he is the school's all-time scoring leader with 2,559 career points. He was a three-time district MVP and a three-time district All-First-Team pick. Abrams averaged 16.6 points and 1.3 steals per game as a high school senior and lead his team to 35–4 record, Regional Finalist.

== College career ==
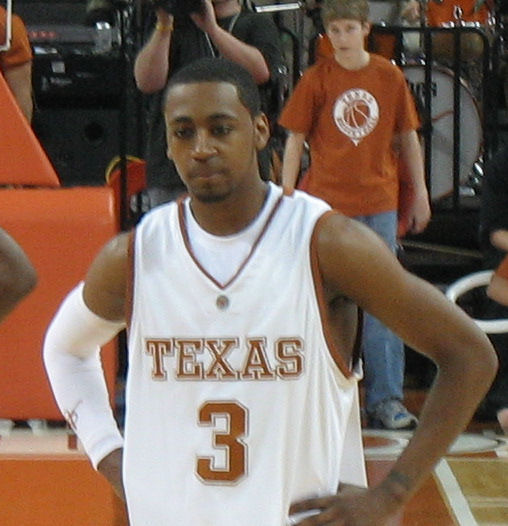
Abrams with the Texas Longhorns in 2007

In his freshman year with the University of Texas, Abrams averaged 6.4 points and 3.0 assists and was named to the Big 12 All-Freshman team. In his sophomore year, Abrams started all 35 games averaging 15.5 points and led the team with a 92.4 free throw percentage. He was selected as an All-Big 12 Honorable Mention. In his junior year he averaged 16.2 points per game and was named to the All-Big 12 Second Team. Abrams also was the 28th player in Texas men's basketball history to score 1,000 career points. On January 31, 2009, Abrams broke the Big 12 career record for 3-pointers in an 81–85 loss to Kansas State, passing the mark of 338 held by Kansas's Jeff Boschee.

== Professional career ==
Abrams signed with the Greek League club Trikala 2000 in 2009. He signed with the Italian Second Division club Scaligera Basket Verona in 2010.

== Personal life ==
Abrams is the son of Andy and Michelle Abrams. His father was a college basketball official and previously worked as a bodyguard for Ann Richards.

== Awards and accomplishments ==
=== College ===
- 2006–07 All-Big 12 Honorable Mention
- 2007–08 All-Big 12 Second Team
- 2008–09 All-Big 12 Second Team
