= NGMS =

NGMS may refer to:

- National Guard Military School
- National Gypsy Minority Self-Government
- Next Generation Mobile Services
- Noel Grisham Middle School
