= Patrick Dendy =

American football player (born 1982)

No. 34, 43, 29
- Position: Cornerback

Personal information
- Born: March 10, 1982 (age 44); Austin, Texas, U.S.
- Listed height: 6 ft 0 in (1.83 m)
- Listed weight: 190 lb (86 kg)

Career information
- High school: McNeil (TX)
- College: Rice
- NFL draft: 2005: undrafted

Career history
- Green Bay Packers (2005–2006); Carolina Panthers (2007)

Career NFL statistics
- Total tackles: 54
- Pass deflections: 6
- Interceptions: 3
- Defensive touchdowns: 1
- Stats at Pro Football Reference

Patrick Jordan Dendy (born March 10, 1982) is an American former professional football player who was a cornerback in the National Football League (NFL). He played college football for the Rice Owls and was signed by the Green Bay Packers as an undrafted free agent in 2005.

Dendy also played for the Carolina Panthers.

== Professional career ==
On November 12, 2006, he intercepted his first NFL pass of Minnesota Vikings quarterback Brad Johnson. On September 1, 2007, he was released by the Packers.
