= McNeil High School =

Location
- 5720 McNeil Road; Austin, Texas 78729; United States; 30°26′57″N 97°44′00″W

Information
- Type: Free public
- Motto: Vision into Reality
- Established: 1992
- School district: Round Rock Independent School District
- Principal: Interim Principal Byron Gerard
- Staff: 153.86 (FTE)
- Grades: 9–12
- Enrollment: 2,706 (2025–2026)
- Student to teacher ratio: 16.46
- Campus type: Suburban
- Colors: Navy blue Forest green White
- Athletics conference: UIL Class 6A
- Nickname: Mavericks
- Website: McNeil High School

McNeil High School (commonly known as MHS or McNeil) is a public secondary school in an unincorporated area in both Travis and Williamson counties, in Austin, Texas, United States. Serving freshmen, sophomores, juniors, and seniors, the school is part of the Round Rock Independent School District (RRISD), with admission primarily based on the locations of students' homes in the district. Four middle schools feed into McNeil: Cedar Valley, Chisholm Trail, Pearson Ranch and Deerpark. The school colors are navy blue, forest green, and white, and the mascot is the Maverick.

McNeil is Designated as a 6A school under the University Interscholastic League (UIL)

McNeil is located on the border of Williamson and Travis County, with part of the school in one county and the rest in another.

The school serves: the census-designated place of Jollyville, and sections of the Brushy Creek CDP. The U.S. Census Bureau, prior to 2010, defined the Jollyville CDP as including a portion of the school area.

== Academic awards ==
McNeil was named a National Blue Ribbon School in 1999–2000. Children at Risk ranked McNeil the #10 public high school in Austin in 2012. The high school was also recognized as a PLTW Distinguished School in 2019, one of just 133 high schools in the United States.

== Marching Band ==
The McNeil High School marching band has had many notable achievements, including a tie for 14th place with Seven Lakes High School Marching band at BOA. This is a historical high placement for the band with a score of 87.750.

== Athletics ==
=== Boys ===
Tennis, Cross Country, Swimming, Club Lacrosse, Basketball, Soccer, Track & Field, Golf, Baseball, Football, Powerlifting, Water polo, and Wrestling.

=== Girls ===
Tennis, Cross Country, Swimming, Club Lacrosse, Basketball, Soccer, Track & Field, Golf, Softball, Cheerleading, Volleyball, Water Polo, and Wrestling.

== Notable alumni ==
- A. J. Abrams, professional basketball player
- Armoni Brooks, NBA player
- Patrick Dendy, NFL player
- Scott Linebrink, MLB player
- Aaron Williams, NFL player
- James Talarico, United States senator from Texas
