= Round Rock High School =

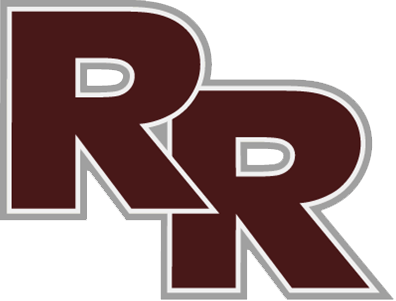

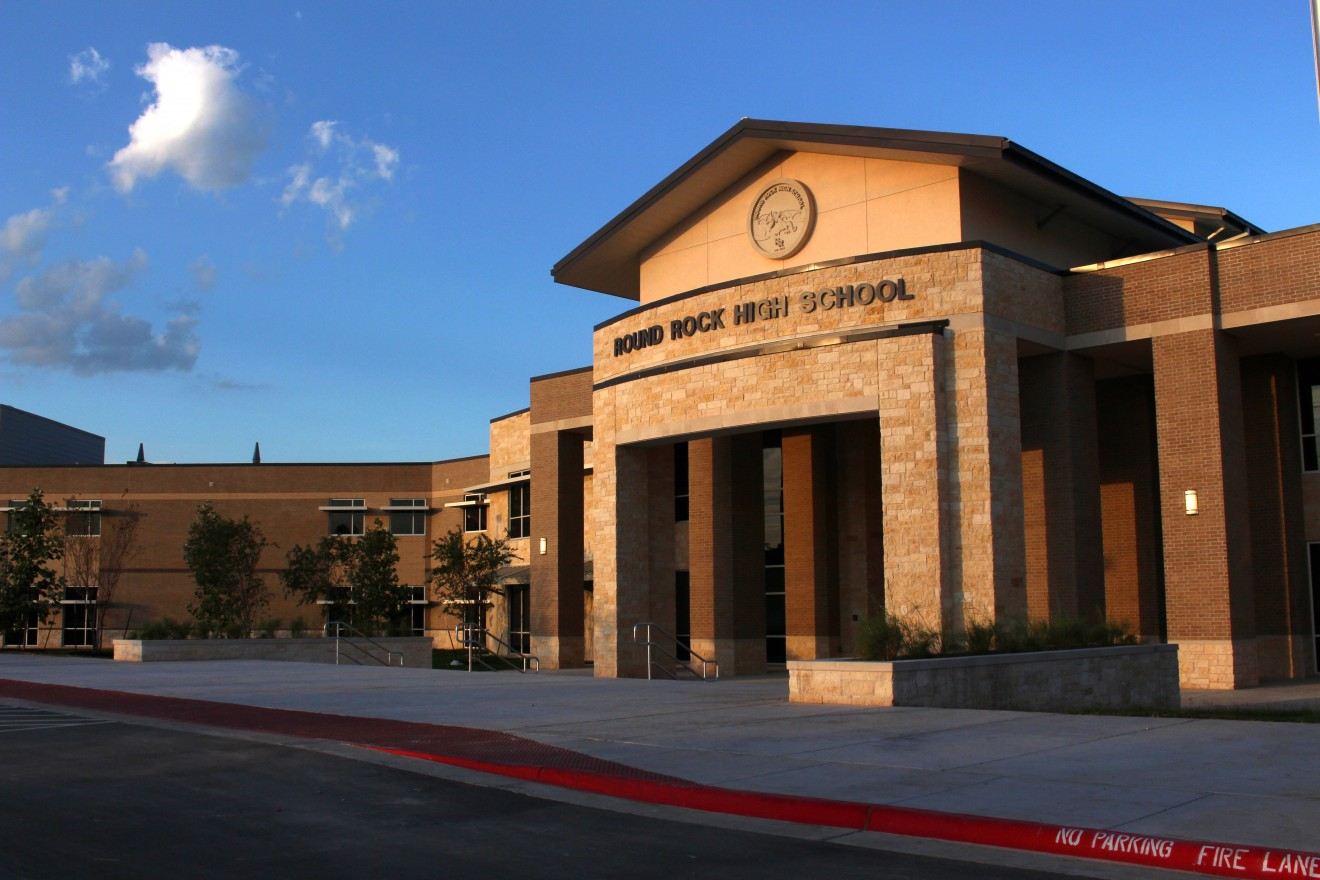

Location
- 201 Deep Wood Drive; Round Rock, Texas; United States; 30°30′33″N 97°41′44″W

Information
- Type: High School
- Established: 1913
- School district: Round Rock Independent School District
- Principal: Gordon Butler
- Faculty: 219.44 FTEs
- Grades: 9–12
- Enrollment: 3,899 (2025-2026)
- Student to teacher ratio: 17.04
- Campus type: Suburban
- Color: Maroon White
- Athletics conference: UIL Class 6A
- Nickname: Dragons
- Website: rrhs.roundrockisd.org

Round Rock High School is a public high school located in Round Rock, Texas, a suburb of North Austin. Founded in 1867, it is the oldest high school in the Round Rock Independent School District. In 2021, it was the largest high school in the Greater Austin area by student enrollment.

Round Rock High School is designated by the UIL as a 6A school.

== Extracurricular activities ==
Round Rock received national attention for its 1994-95 yearbook, believed to be the first ever released in CD-ROM format. The yearbook contained 2,000 photographs, 25 minutes of video and 20 minutes of audio material.

In 1996–97, the baseball team won the 5A State Championship, defeating Lubbock Monterey by a score of 7–1 in the tournament final.

The Computer Science team won the 5A State Championship in 1998.

The Round Rock Swim & Dive team has made it to the State Championship meet 18 times since 2008. The Men and Women's swim teams are the most decorated athletic teams at Round Rock High School.

In 2025-26, the Round Rock Girl's Soccer team won the 6A State Championship, defeating Keller by a score of 3-1 in the tournament final.

The Round Rock Men's Gymnastics team won the 2024-25 and the 2025-26 THSGCA State Championships. In 2024-25 they had a team score of 340.750 and in 2025-26 they had a team score of 346.100.

The Round Rock Dragon Band and Color Guard is a musical ensemble made up of wind and percussion instruments. It marched in the 2015 Rose parade. The band has attended 7 BOA Grand Nationals marching competitions (2013, 2015, 2017, 2019, 2021, 2023, and 2025).

== Notable alumni ==
- Jarrett Allen, National Basketball Association (NBA) center
- Jeffrey S. Boyd, associate justice of the Texas Supreme Court
- John Danks, Major League Baseball (MLB) starting pitcher
- Jordan Danks, Major League Baseball (MLB) outfielder
- Brian Gordon, Major League Baseball (MLB) outfielder and starting pitcher
- John Henson (basketball), National Basketball Association (NBA) center
- Ryan Langerhans, Major League Baseball (MLB) outfielder
- James Lynch, National Football League (NFL) defensive tackle
- Travis Sykora, Major League Baseball (MLB) pitcher
- Mason Thompson, Major League Baseball (MLB) relief pitcher
- Leonard Moore (American football), College Football (CFB) cornerback
