= John Miller (offensive lineman, born 1993) =

American football player (born 1993)

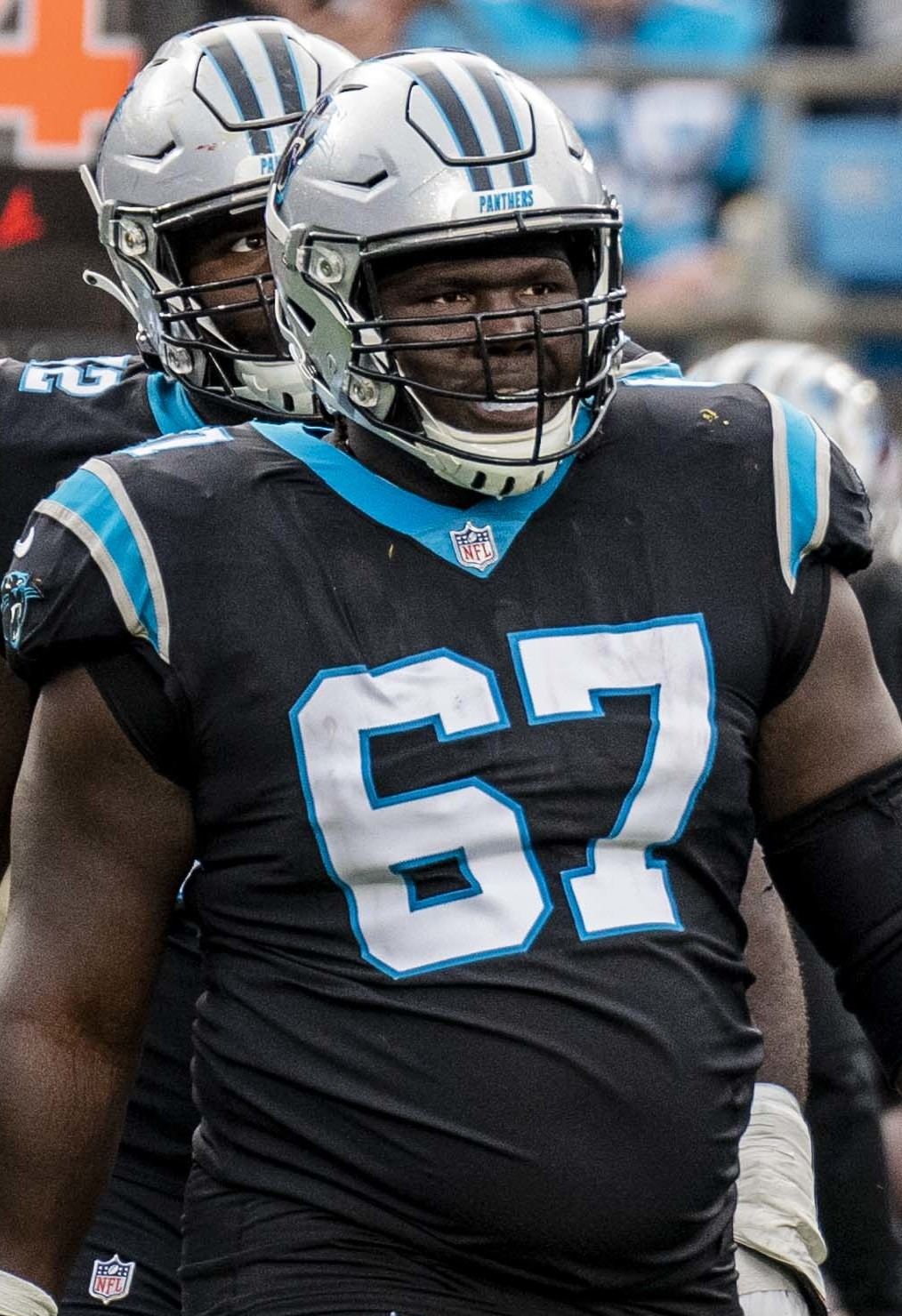
- Miller with the Carolina Panthers in 2021

No. 67, 76
- Position: Guard

Personal information
- Born: August 12, 1993 (age 33); Miami, Florida, U.S.
- Listed height: 6 ft 3 in (1.91 m)
- Listed weight: 315 lb (143 kg)

Career information
- High school: Miami Central (West Little River, Florida)
- College: Louisville
- NFL draft: 2015: 3rd round, 81st overall pick

Career history
- Buffalo Bills (2015–2018); Cincinnati Bengals (2019); Carolina Panthers (2020–2021); Jacksonville Jaguars (2022)

Career NFL statistics
- Games played: 87
- Games started: 84
- Stats at Pro Football Reference

John Miller (born August 12, 1993) is an American former professional football player who was a guard in the National Football League (NFL). He played college football for the Louisville Cardinals. He was selected by the Buffalo Bills with the 81st overall pick in the third round of the 2015 NFL draft. He also played for the Cincinnati Bengals, Carolina Panthers, and Jacksonville Jaguars.

== College career ==
Miller made 46 career starts at left guard for Louisville. He was an honorable mention All-Atlantic Coast Conference pick as a senior. In 2015, he participated in the Senior Bowl.

== Professional career ==
Pre-draft measurables
Height	Weight	Arm length	Hand span	40-yard dash	10-yard split	20-yard split	20-yard shuttle	Three-cone drill	Vertical jump	Broad jump	Bench press	Wonderlic
6 ft 2 1/2 in (1.89 m)	303 lb (137 kg)	33 1/4 in (0.84 m)	10 1/4 in (0.26 m)	5.20 s	1.78 s	3.13 s	4.70 s	7.84 s	28.0 in (0.71 m)	8 ft 10 in (2.69 m)	29 reps	14
All values from NFL Combine/Pro Day

=== Buffalo Bills ===
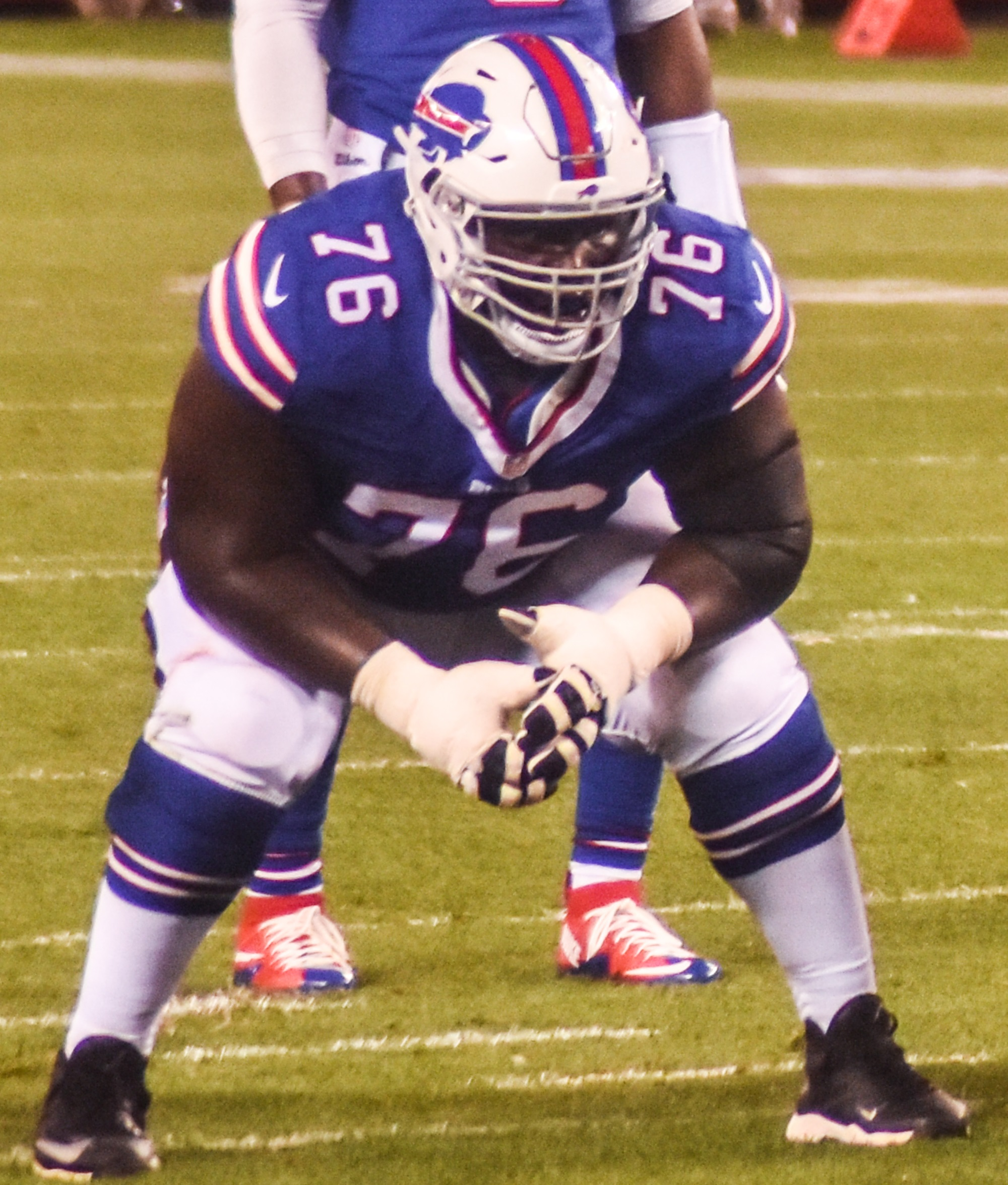
Miller with the Buffalo Bills in 2015.

Despite his dependable college career, a poor combine hurt Miller's draft stock. He was drafted by the Buffalo Bills in the third round of the 2015 NFL draft. With a strong offseason, Miller was named the starting right guard for 2015.

In 2017, Miller started the first four games at right guard before losing the starting job to veteran Vladimir Ducasse.

In 2018, Miller started 15 games at right guard, missing one with an ankle injury.

=== Cincinnati Bengals ===
On March 16, 2019, Miller signed a three-year, $16.5 million contract with the Cincinnati Bengals. He started 13 games at right guard in 2019.

On March 18, 2020, Miller was released by the Bengals.

=== Carolina Panthers ===
Miller signed with the Carolina Panthers on March 23, 2020. He started 14 games at right guard in 2020.

On March 31, 2021, Miller re-signed with Panthers. He suffered an ankle injury in Week 7 and was placed on injured reserve on October 26, 2021. He was activated on November 20.

=== Jacksonville Jaguars ===
Miller signed with the Jacksonville Jaguars on October 11, 2022. He was waived on November 23, 2022.
