= Aaron Williams (American football) =

American football player (born 1990)

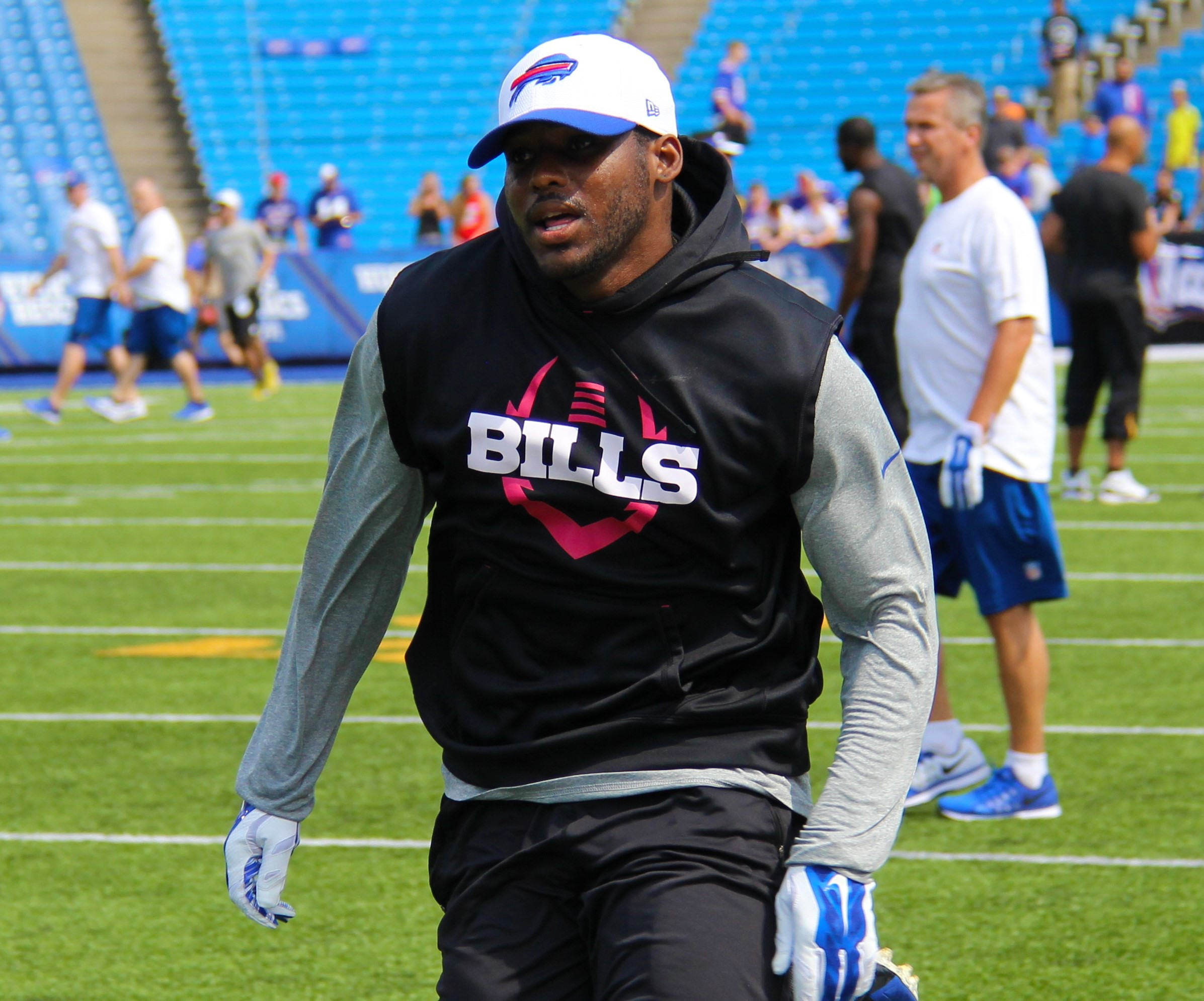
- Williams with the Buffalo Bills in 2015

No. 23
- Position: Safety

Personal information
- Born: April 23, 1990 (age 36); San Jose, California, U.S.
- Listed height: 6 ft 0 in (1.83 m)
- Listed weight: 199 lb (90 kg)

Career information
- High school: McNeil (Austin, Texas)
- College: Texas (2008–2010)
- NFL draft: 2011: 2nd round, 34th overall pick

Career history
- Buffalo Bills (2011–2016)

Awards and highlights
- Second-team All-Big 12 (2010)

Career NFL statistics
- Total tackles: 257
- Pass deflections: 36
- Interceptions: 7
- Forced fumbles: 3
- Fumble recoveries: 1
- Defensive touchdowns: 1
- Stats at Pro Football Reference

Aaron Williams (born April 23, 1990) is an American former professional football player who was a safety in the National Football League (NFL). He played college football for the Texas Longhorns and was selected by the Buffalo Bills in the second round of the 2011 NFL draft.

== Early life ==
Williams attended McNeil High School in Austin, Texas. He was considered the top safety recruit by Rivals.com and the second best cornerback recruit by Scout.com in 2008. He was selected 1st team All-State by Dave Campbell Texas Football magazine and was also named to the 2008 Parade All-American team. Williams was named an outstanding performer at the 2007 Army National Combine which led to him being selected to the 2008 U.S. Army All-American Bowl game. He was also a two-year letterman in baseball and track & field. He chose Texas over offers from Baylor and USC.

== College career ==
As a freshman in 2008, Williams started one of 13 games at cornerback, recording 13 tackles and an interception which was returned 81 yards for a touchdown. As a sophomore in 2009, he played in 13 games, missing one due to an injury, and recorded 31 tackles, two sacks and three interceptions. As a junior in 2010, he started 11 games, missing two due to an injury, and recorded 45 tackles, one quarterback sack, and two forced fumbles.

== Professional career ==
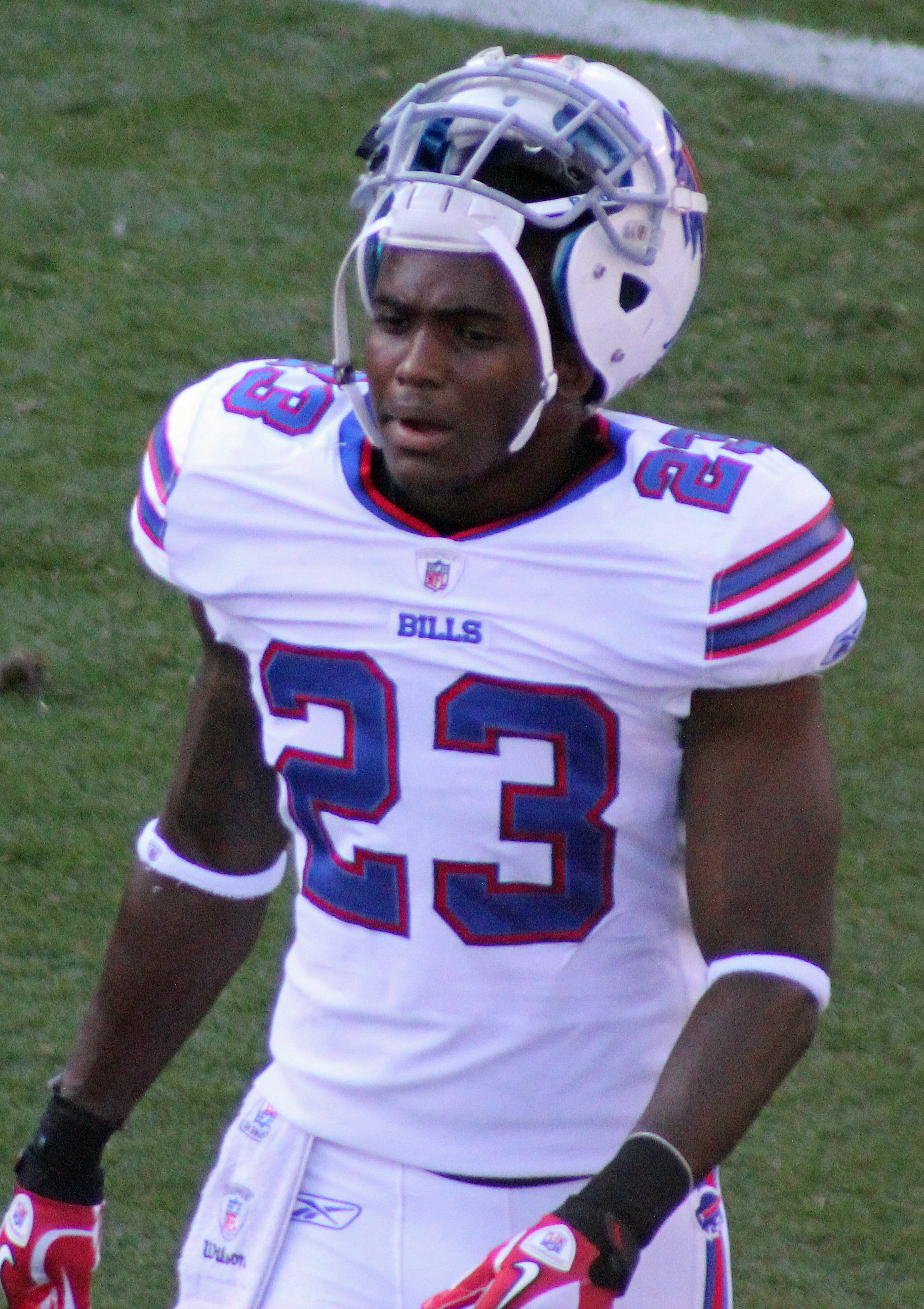
Williams with the Bills in 2011

Williams was selected by the Buffalo Bills as the second pick of the second round (no. 34 overall) in the 2011 NFL draft.

Pre-draft measurables
Height	Weight	Arm length	Hand span	Wingspan	40-yard dash	10-yard split	20-yard split	20-yard shuttle	Three-cone drill	Vertical jump	Broad jump	Bench press
5 ft 11 7/8 in (1.83 m)	204 lb (93 kg)	31 1/2 in (0.80 m)	9 1/4 in (0.23 m)	6 ft 3 3/4 in (1.92 m)	4.40 s	1.57 s	2.48 s	4.07 s	6.72 s	37.5 in (0.95 m)	10 ft 7 in (3.23 m)	18 reps
All values from 2011 NFL Scouting Combine/Pro Day

Following an up and down first two seasons at cornerback, Williams was moved to safety for the 2013 season.

On March 5, 2014, Williams signed a four-year, $26 million extension with the Bills.

In 2015, Williams was injured in a Week 2 game against the New England Patriots while attempting a flying goal line tackle on Julian Edelman. He was completely motionless on the turf, and was taken off the field in an ambulance. Early reports stated he suffered a neck injury.

In 2016, during a Week 3 game against the Arizona Cardinals, Williams scored his first NFL touchdown, returning a botched field goal attempt for the score. In Week 7, Williams suffered another serious neck injury after a hit by Miami Dolphins wide receiver Jarvis Landry. He was placed on injured reserve on November 1, 2016, effectively ending his season.

On March 9, 2017, Williams was released by the Bills.

On January 31, 2018, Williams announced his retirement from the NFL after six seasons in Buffalo. His retirement came after multiple head and neck injuries throughout his career, citing it was the main concern of other teams not signing him after workouts in 2017, including the Jaguars, Texans, and Chiefs.

== NFL career statistics ==
Legend
	Led the league
**Bold**	Career high

Year	Team	Games		Tackles					Interceptions					Fumbles			
Year	Team	GP	GS	Cmb	Solo	Ast	Sck	TFL	Int	Yds	TD	Lng	PD	FF	FR	Yds	TD
2011	BUF	9	6	32	27	5	0.0	0	1	0	0	0	5	**1**	0	0	0
2012	BUF	11	10	32	24	8	0.0	0	0	0	0	0	7	**1**	0	0	0
2013	BUF	14	**14**	**82**	**60**	22	0.0	**2**	**4**	**43**	0	**34**	**11**	**1**	0	0	0
2014	BUF	**15**	**14**	76	51	**25**	0.0	**2**	1	26	0	26	5	0	0	0	0
2015	BUF	3	3	15	9	6	0.0	0	1	26	0	26	3	0	0	0	0
2016	BUF	7	5	20	13	7	0.0	1	0	0	0	0	5	0	**1**	**53**	**1**
Career		59	52	257	184	73	0.0	5	7	95	0	34	36	3	1	53	1
