= Duke Williams (safety) =

American football player (born 1990)

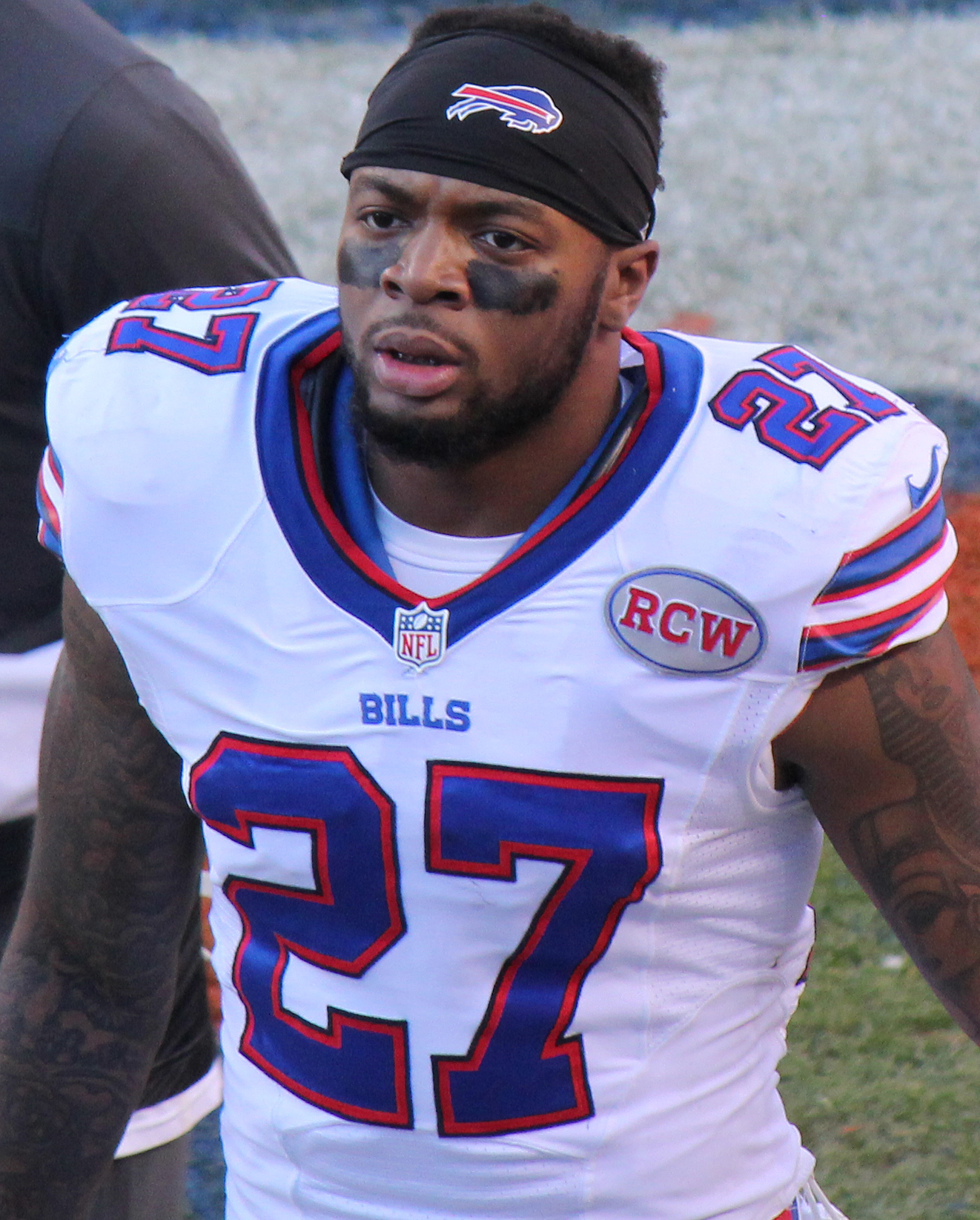
- Williams with the Buffalo Bills in 2014

No. 27, 31
- Position: Safety

Personal information
- Born: October 15, 1990 (age 36); Tallulah, Louisiana, U.S.
- Listed height: 5 ft 11 in (1.80 m)
- Listed weight: 201 lb (91 kg)

Career information
- High school: Hug (Reno, Nevada)
- College: Nevada
- NFL draft: 2013: 4th round, 105th overall pick

Career history
- Buffalo Bills (2013–2016); Indianapolis Colts (2016)

Awards and highlights
- Second-team All-WAC (2011); Second-team All-MWC (2012)

Career NFL statistics
- Total tackles: 92
- Sacks: 1
- Forced fumbles: 1
- Fumble recoveries: 3
- Interceptions: 1
- Defensive touchdowns: 1
- Stats at Pro Football Reference

Michael "Duke" Williams (born October 15, 1990) is an American former professional football player who was a safety in the National Football League (NFL). He played college football for the Nevada Wolf Pack, and was selected by the Buffalo Bills in the fourth round of the 2013 NFL draft. Williams has also played for the Indianapolis Colts.

== Early life ==
Williams attended Hug High School in Reno, Nevada, and played high school football for the Hug Hawks. He was a three-sport standout who earned 12 varsity letters in his career in football, basketball and track and field. He played both ways as a quarterback and defensive back, and was the Northern Nevada Player of the Year as a senior and a three-time all-state selection as a safety.

Duke was also an accomplished athlete, he competed for the school's track & field team as a jumper and sprinter. He won the 100 meters at the 2009 Northwest Invite, setting a career-best time of 11.34 seconds. He won the triple jump at the 2009 Fallon Elks Invitational, with a personal-best jump of 15.20 meters, that ranked in the top 10 in the nation that year. He was also a member of the 4 × 100-meter relay team that broke the state record with a time of 41.34 seconds.

Rated as only a two-star recruit by Rivals.com, his only scholarship offer came from University of Nevada, Reno, which he accepted.

== College career ==
Williams enrolled in the University of Nevada, Reno, where he played for the Nevada Wolf Pack football team from 2009 to 2012. As a true freshman in 2009, playing as a key member on special teams and sparingly, he recorded 28 tackles. In 2010, he started 10 games and played in 13 for the Wolf Pack. He was third on the team with 74 tackles on the year, including 4.5 tackles for loss and two interceptions. As a junior, he earned all-conference honors for the first time in his career as he was named to the second-team. He started all 13 games, and was third on the team overall with 78 tackles, including five tackles for loss, six pass deflections and an interception. In his senior season, he finished with a career-high 106 tackles, including 5.5 for loss, nine pass deflections, eight pass breakups and an interception. He earned second-team all-conference honors in his last season.

== Professional career ==
=== Buffalo Bills ===
He was selected by the Buffalo Bills in the fourth round, with the 105th pick overall, of the 2013 NFL draft.

On May 10, 2013, he signed a four-year contract with the Bills. On November 24, 2014, he recorded his first career interception against the New York Jets on a throw from Michael Vick. On November 12, 2015, he got his first NFL touchdown in a fumble recovery against the Jets.

On November 15, 2016, Williams was released by the Bills.

=== Indianapolis Colts ===
On December 12, 2016, Williams was signed by the Indianapolis Colts. He was released on May 1, 2017.

=== NFL statistics ===
Year	Team	GP	COMB	TOTAL	AST	SACK	FF	FR	FR YDS	INT	IR YDS	AVG IR	LNG	TD	PD
2013	BUF	16	07	05	02	0.0	0	0	00	0	00	00	00	0	0
2014	BUF	16	53	39	14	0.0	1	2	03	1	34	34	34	0	3
2015	BUF	16	26	23	03	1.0	0	1	19	0	00	00	00	0	1
Career		48	86	67	19	1.0	1	3	0	1	34	34	34	0	4
