= Round Rock Independent School District =

School district in Texas

Address
- 1311 Round Rock Ave Round Rock, Williamson County, Texas, 78681; United States

District information
- Motto: The Destination District for Public Schools
- Grades: K-12
- Established: May 1913
- Superintendent: Dr. Hafedh Azaiez
- Schools: 60
- Budget: $446,335,000
- NCES District ID: 4838080

Students and staff
- Students: 46,197
- Teachers: 3,292.61 FTE
- Staff: 2,947.52 FTE
- Student–teacher ratio: 14.03
- Athletic conference: UIL District 14 6A
- Colors: Teal and White

Other information
- Website: www.roundrockisd.org

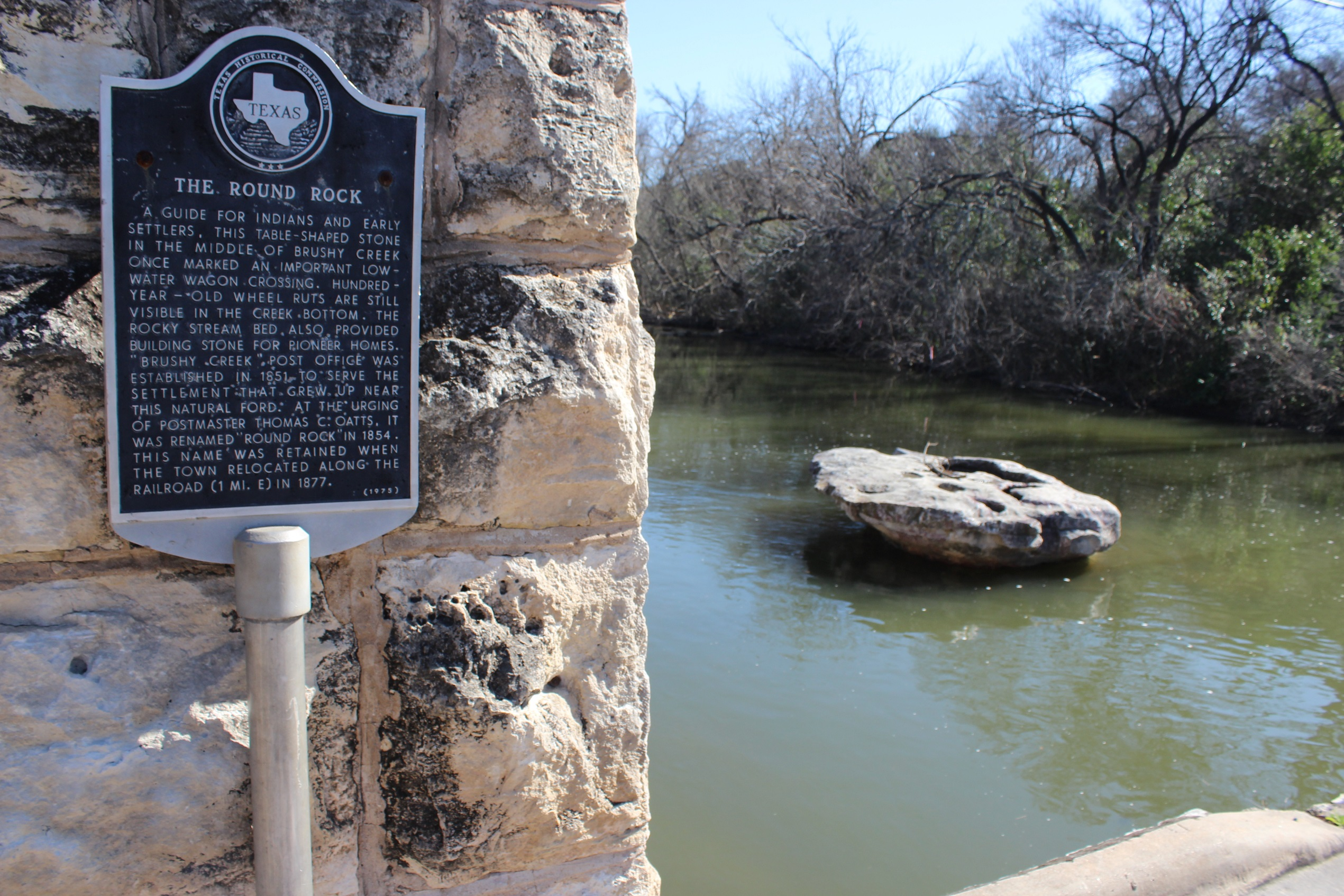
The Round Rock

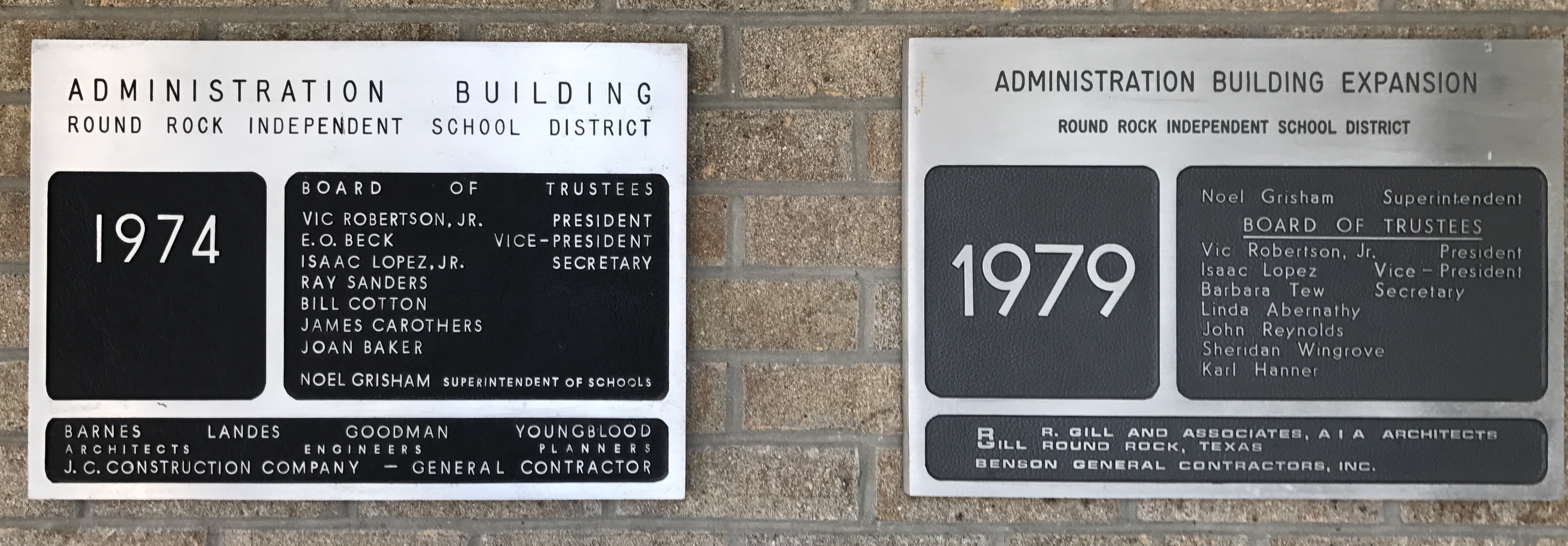
Entry to Lillie Delgado Administration Building

Round Rock Independent School District (RRISD) is a school district headquartered in the city of Round Rock, Texas, United States. As of 2022, the school district serves over 48,000 students, prekindergarten through grade 12.

District boundaries are approximately 110 square miles (280 km^{2}) and include 56 schools that serve students in southern Williamson County, northwest Travis County, the city of Round Rock and portions of the cities of Austin and Cedar Park.

Student enrollment for the 2023–2024 school year is 47,699. Round Rock ISD employs approximately 6,340 employees.

== History ==
On May 17, 1913, the Williamson County government approved incorporation of Williamson County Common School District #19, forming RRISD. Originally, the district consisted of only two schools.

== Schools ==
=== Public schools of choice ===
Round Rock ISD public schools of choice provides students access to innovative programming that engages and taps into their specific interests, aspirations and preferred learning styles.

=== Secondary schools ===
==== High schools ====
- Cedar Ridge High School (CRHS)
- Success High School (SHS), a Round Rock ISD public school of choice
- Early College High School (ECHS), a Round Rock ISD public school of choice that provides students with up to 60 college credit hours towards a bachelor's degree
- McNeil High School (MHS), a Capital Area Regional Day School for the Deaf (9-12).
- Round Rock High School (RRHS)
- Stony Point High School (SPHS), a Round Rock ISD public school of choice featuring the IB Diploma Program
- Westwood High School (WHS), a Round Rock ISD public school of choice featuring the IB Diploma Program

==== Middle schools ====
- C.D. Fulkes Middle School
- Canyon Vista Middle School
- Cedar Valley Middle School
- Chisholm Trail Middle School
- Deerpark Middle School and Capital Area Regional Day School for the Deaf (6-8)
- Grisham Middle School, a Round Rock ISD public school of choice featuring the IB Secondary Years Program School
- Hernandez Middle School, a Round Rock ISD public school of choice featuring the IB Secondary Years Program School
- Hopewell Middle School
- Pearson Ranch Middle School
- Ridgeview Middle School
- Walsh Middle School

==== Alternative schools ====
- GOALS Learning Center (GOALS)
- Round Rock Opportunity Center (RROC)

=== Primary schools ===
==== Elementary schools ====
- Anderson Mill Elementary School, a Round Rock ISD public school of choice featuring the IB Primary Years Program
- Claude Berkman Elementary Arts Integration Academy, a Round Rock ISD public school of choice
- Blackland Prairie Elementary School and Leadership Academy, a Round Rock ISD public school of choice
- Bluebonnet Elementary School
- Brushy Creek Elementary School
- Cactus Ranch Elementary School
- Caldwell Heights Elementary School, a Round Rock ISD public school of choice featuring the IB Primary Years Program
- Neysa Callison Elementary School
- Canyon Creek Elementary School
- Kathy Caraway Elementary School (formerly North Oaks Elementary. Name changed in 2005.)
- Chandler Oaks Elementary School, a Round Rock ISD public school of choice featuring the IB Primary Years Program
- Deep Wood Elementary School
- Double File Trail Elementary School and Leadership Academy, a Round Rock ISD public school of choice
- Elsa England Elementary School, a Round Rock ISD public school of choice featuring Project Lead the Way
- Fern Bluff Elementary School
- Forest Creek Elementary School
- Forest North Elementary School
- Gattis Elementary School
- Great Oaks Elementary School and Leadership Academy, a Round Rock ISD public school of choice
- Linda Herrington Elementary School
- Joe Lee Johnson Elementary STEAM Academy, a Round Rock ISD public school of choice
- Jollyville Elementary School
- Laurel Mountain Elementary School
- Live Oak Elementary School and Capital Area Regional Day School for the Deaf (K-5)
- Old Town Elementary School
- Pond Springs Elementary School
- Purple Sage Elementary School
- Vic Robertson Elementary School
- Patsy Sommer Elementary School
- Redbud Elementary School
- Spicewood Elementary School, a Round Rock ISD public school of choice featuring the IB Primary Years Program
- Teravista Elementary School and Leadership Academy, a Round Rock ISD public school of choice
- Union Hill Elementary School
- Xenia Voigt Elementary Arts Integration Academy
- Wells Branch Elementary Arts Integration Academy, a Round Rock ISD public school of choice

=== Alternative school ===
- Elementary Disciplinary Alternative Education Program (DAEP)

== Statistics ==
2018-2019 Information
	RRISD	Statewide
Beginning teachers' salary	$50,250	$48,996
Average teachers' number of years experience	11%	11.1%
Economically disadvantaged students	27.9%	60.6%
Students with limited English proficiency	10.2%	19.5%
Student / teacher ratio	15	15.1

Demographics

- African American: 9.0%
- Hispanic: 30.7%
- White: 38.2%
- American Indian: 0.4%
- Asian: 17.7%
- Pacific Islander: 0.2%
- Two or more races: 4%

== Governance ==
The Round Rock Independent School District is governed by a seven-member Board of Trustees, who are elected at-large to serve staggered four-year terms. As of February 2025, the board is composed of:

Round Rock Independent School District Board of Trustees
Place	Name	Position	Term	
1	Chuy Zárate	Trustee	2024	2028
2	Melissa Ross	Trustee	2024	2028
3	Amber Feller	Secretary	2022	2026
4	Alicia Markum	Vice president	2022	2026
5	Amy Weir	Secretary	2022	2026
6	Tiffanie Harrison	President	2022	2026
7	Michael Wei	Trustee	2024	2028

== Special Facilities ==
The Round Rock Independent School District has 14 special facilities as of January 2022.

=== Performing Arts Centers ===
- Raymond E. Hartfield Performing Arts Center
- Auditorium at Cedar Ridge High School
- Auditorium at Stony Point High School

=== Transportation Centers ===
- Transportation East Facility
- Transportation West Facility

=== Athletic Stadiums ===
- Kelly Reeves Athletic Complex
- Dragon Stadium - Located at Round Rock High School
- Aquatics Practice Facility - Approved in 2018 Bond Package

== See also ==
- List of school districts in Texas
