= 2013 New York Jets season =

2013 season of NFL team New York Jets

- Owner: Woody & Christopher Johnson
- General manager: John Idzik
- Head coach: Rex Ryan
- Home stadium: MetLife Stadium

Results
- Record: 8–8
- Division place: 2nd AFC East
- Playoffs: Did not qualify
- Pro Bowlers: C Nick Mangold; CB Antonio Cromartie

Uniform
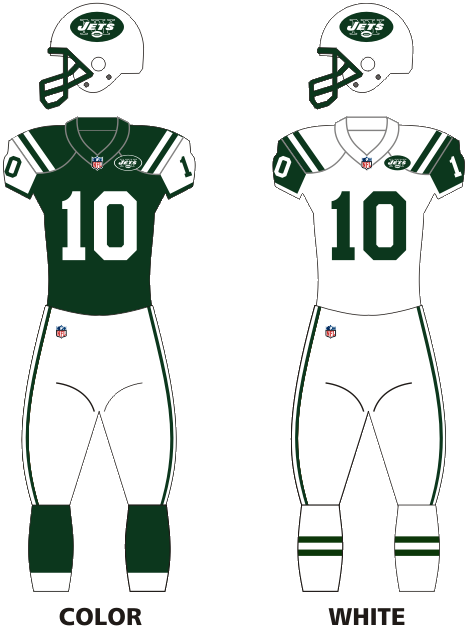

The 2013 season New York Jets' 44th in the National Football League (NFL) and their 54th overall. The Jets improved on their 6–10 regular season record from 2012 and attempted to make history as the first host team to play the Super Bowl on their own home turf, alongside the New York Giants, with whom they share the same home field, MetLife Stadium. However, they missed the playoffs for a third consecutive season. The Jets alternated between wins and losses during the first 9 weeks, then lost 3 straight, then won 3 of their last 4 games to finish 8–8.

== Transactions ==
=== Coaching and personnel changes ===
- Special teams coach Mike Westhoff retired on December 30, 2012. He was replaced by assistant Ben Kotwica.
- Outside linebackers coach Mike Smith left the team after the season to join Texas Tech as the co-defensive coordinator.
- General manager Mike Tannenbaum was fired on December 31, 2012. He was replaced on January 18, 2013 by John Idzik.
- Head Strength and Conditioning coach Bill Hughan was fired on January 3, 2012. He was replaced by assistant Justus Galac.
- Quarterbacks coach Matt Cavanaugh was not retained by the team. He was replaced by David Lee on January 20, 2013.
- Offensive coordinator Tony Sparano was fired on January 7, 2013. He was replaced by Marty Mornhinweg on January 18, 2013.
- Defensive coordinator Mike Pettine accepted an offer to become the defensive coordinator for the Buffalo Bills on January 9, 2013. Assistant defensive backs coach Jim O'Neil accepted an offer to join Pettine. Pettine was replaced by the Jets' defensive backs coach Dennis Thurman while O'Neil was replaced by assistant Brian Smith.
- Linebackers coach Bob Sutton accepted an offer to become the defensive coordinator for the Kansas City Chiefs on January 11, 2013. He was replaced by Brian VanGorder.
- The Jets hired Tim McDonald as their defensive backs coach to Dennis Thurman.
- The Jets fired offensive line coach Dave DeGuglielmo, replacing him with assistant Mike Devlin.
- Offensive quality control and assistant tight ends coach Lance Taylor accepted an offer to become the assistant wide receivers coach for the Carolina Panthers.
- The Jets hired assistant special teams coach Louie Aguiar, tight ends coach Steve Hagen, assistant offensive line coach Ron Heller, assistant strength and conditioning coach Pierre Ngo, and assistant defensive line and linebackers coach Jeff Weeks.
- The Jets hired Bobby April III as a defensive quality control coach.

=== Arrivals ===
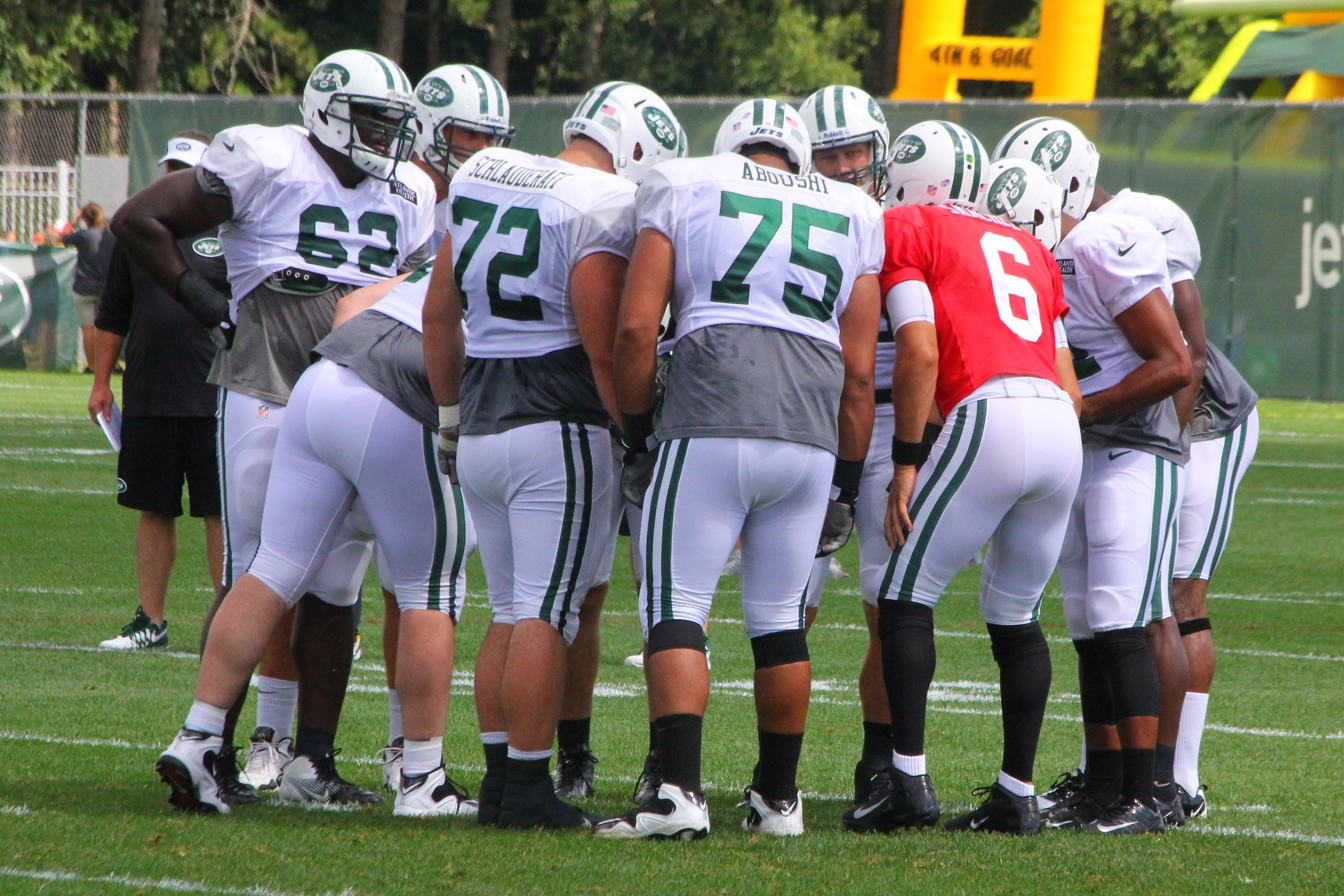
Jets players including Oday Aboushi at the team's training camp in August 2013

- The Jets signed JoJo Dickson, Tevita Finau, Jaiquawn Jarrett, Dennis Landolt, Royce Pollard, Titus Ryan, Matt Simms, and Jacquies Smith to reserve/future contracts on December 31, 2012.
- The Jets signed Emmanuel Arceneaux, Bret Lockett, Claude Davis, and Joseph Collins to reserve/future contracts on January 2, 2013.
- The Jets signed Travis Tripucka to a reserve/future contract on January 3, 2013.
- The Jets signed Danny Lansanah and Cliff Harris to reserve/future contracts on January 4, 2013.
- The Jets signed D. J. Young to a reserve/future contract on January 17, 2013.
- The Jets signed Vidal Hazelton to a reserve/future contract on January 23, 2013.
- The Jets signed Eric Crocker, Junior Aumavae, and Thomas Mayo on March 1, 2013.
- The Jets signed David Garrard on March 11, 2013.
- The Jets signed Mike Goodson, Willie Colon, and Antonio Garay on March 15, 2013.
- The Jets signed Antwan Barnes on March 18, 2013.
- The Jets signed Dawan Landry on April 9, 2013.
- The Jets signed Ryan Quigley and Derek Dimke on April 11, 2013.
- The Jets signed Calvin Pace on April 16, 2013.
- The Jets signed Stephen Peterman on April 26, 2013.
- The Jets signed undrafted free agents Zach Rogers, Ryan Spadola, K. J. Stoud, Antavious Wilson, Chris Pantale, Mike Shanahan, Dalton Freeman, Trey Gilleo, Mark Popek, Roosevelt Holliday, Jake McDonough, Troy Davis, Mike Edwards, and Rontez Miles on April 29, 2013.
- The Jets signed Thomas Mayo, Lanier Coleman, Brett Maher, and Sean Progar-Jackson on May 12, 2013.
- The Jets signed Marcus Davis on May 14, 2013.
- The Jets signed Ben Obomanu on May 30, 2013.
- The Jets signed Kellen Winslow II on June 14, 2013.
- The Jets signed Billy Cundiff, Jeffrey Shugarts, and Pat Scales on July 23, 2013.
- The Jets signed Leger Douzable on July 25, 2013.
- The Jets signed Chad Spann on July 27, 2013.
- The Jets signed Mossis Madu, Erik Cook, and Michael Campbell on August 4, 2013.
- The Jets signed Kahlil Bell and Rahsaan Vaughn on August 11, 2013.
- The Jets signed Patrick Ford on August 13, 2013.
- The Jets claimed Scott Wedige off waivers on August 20, 2013.
- The Jets signed Marcus Rucker on August 21, 2013.
- The Jets signed Mohamed Massaquoi on August 22, 2013.
- The Jets re-signed Jason Smith on August 23, 2013.
- The Jets signed Dan Carpenter on August 27, 2013.
- The Jets signed Graham Harrell on August 28, 2013.
- The Jets claimed Alex Green, Ben Ijalana and Scott Solomon off waivers and signed Michael Campbell, Troy Davis, Tevita Finau, Dalton Freeman, Rontez Miles, Chris Pantale, and J. B. Shugarts to the practice squad on September 1, 2013.
- The Jets signed Brady Quinn on September 2, 2013.
- The Jets signed Danny Lansanah and Junior Aumavae to the practice squad on September 3, 2013.
- The Jets signed Brady Quinn to the active roster and Rahsaan Vaughn to the practice squad on September 9, 2013.
- The Jets signed Ben Obomanu on September 10, 2013.
- The Jets signed Ryan Quigley and Scott Solomon to the active roster and Danny Lansanah to the practice squad on September 16, 2013.
- The Jets signed Kareem Huggins to the practice squad on September 25, 2013.
- The Jets signed David Nelson to the active roster and Troy Davis to the practice squad on October 2, 2013.
- The Jets claimed Zach Sudfeld off waivers on October 4, 2013.
- The Jets signed Ricky Sapp to the active roster and T.J. Barnes to the practice squad on October 9, 2013.
- The Jets signed Saalim Hakim to the practice squad and David Garrard on October 10, 2013.
- The Jets signed Josh Cribbs and Greg Salas to the active roster and Miguel Maysonet to the practice squad on October 15, 2013.
- The Jets signed Ras-I Dowling to the practice squad on October 23, 2013.
- The Jets re-signed Rontez Miles to the practice squad on November 13, 2013.
- The Jets signed Ed Reed on November 14, 2013.
- The Jets signed Jermaine Cunningham on November 20, 2013.
- The Jets re-signed Michael Campbell to the practice squad on November 27, 2013.
- The Jets signed Darius Reynaud on December 3, 2013.
- The Jets signed Tim Fugger to the practice squad on December 4, 2013.
- The Jets signed Dwight Jones to the practice squad on December 18, 2013.

=== Departures ===
- The Jets released Bart Scott, Calvin Pace, Eric Smith, Jason Smith, and waived Josh Baker on February 19, 2013.
- The Jets released Sione Pouha on March 12, 2013.
- The Jets waived Tim Tebow on April 29, 2013.
- The Jets waived Cliff Harris, Claude Davis, and D. J. Young on April 30, 2013.
- The Jets waived Emmanuel Arceneaux and Thomas Mayo on May 7, 2013.
- The Jets released Roosevelt Holliday, Derek Dimke, and Royce Pollard on May 12, 2013.
- The Jets released Antavious Wilson on May 14, 2013.
- The Jets placed David Garrard on the reserve/retired list on May 30, 2013.
- The Jets released Travis Tripucka on June 17, 2013.
- The Jets released Brett Maher, Thomas Mayo, and Mark Popek on July 23, 2013.
- The Jets waived Jake McDonough from the active roster and Thomas Mayo from injured reserve on July 25, 2013.
- The Jets released Jordan White and Eric Crocker on August 4, 2013.
- The Jets released Marcus Davis on August 5, 2013.
- The Jets released Vidal Hazelton on August 7, 2013.
- The Jets waived John Griffin on August 11, 2013.
- The Jets released Dennis Landolt on August 13, 2013.
- The Jets released Titus Ryan and Mike Shanahan on August 22, 2013.
- The Jets released Scott Wedige on August 23, 2013.
- The Jets released Joe McKnight, Braylon Edwards, Hayden Smith, Chad Spann, Patrick Ford, Trey Gilleo, Stephen Peterman, Joseph Collins, Marcus Rucker, K. J. Stroud, Rahsaan Vaughn, Sean Progar-Jackson, Donnie Fletcher, Bret Lockett, Ryan Quigley, and Patrick Scales on August 26, 2013.
- The Jets released Billy Cundiff on August 27, 2013.
- The Jets released Dalton Freeman on August 28, 2013.
- The Jets released Greg McElroy, Mossis Madu, Michael Campbell, Mohamed Massaquoi, Ben Obomanu, Zach Rogers, Chris Pantale, Erik Cook, J. B. Shugarts, Jason Smith, Junior Aumavae, Lanier Coleman, Tevita Finau, Antonio Garay, Troy Davis, JoJo Dickson, Jacquies Smith, Royce Adams, Mike Edwards, Rontez Miles, and Dan Carpenter on August 31, 2013.
- The Jets released Kahlil Bell and Danny Lansanah on September 1, 2013.
- The Jets released Graham Harrell on September 2, 2013.
- The Jets released J. B. Shugarts from the practice squad on September 3, 2013.
- The Jets released Brady Quinn on September 7, 2013.
- The Jets released Danny Lansanah on September 9, 2013.
- The Jets released Scott Solomon on September 10, 2013.
- The Jets released Robert Malone from the active roster and Rahsaan Vaughn from the practice squad on September 16, 2013.
- The Jets released Troy Davis from the practice squad on September 25, 2013.
- The Jets released Kareem Huggins from the practice squad and Ben Obomanu from the active roster on October 2, 2013.
- The Jets released Scott Solomon on October 4, 2013.
- The Jets released Ryan Spadola and Ricky Sapp on October 5, 2013.
- The Jets released Junior Aumavae from the practice squad on October 9, 2013.
- The Jets released Brady Quinn on October 21, 2013.
- The Jets released Miguel Maysonet from the practice squad on October 22, 2013.
- The Jets released Rontez Miles on November 11, 2013.
- The Jets released Ricky Sapp on November 14, 2013.

=== Trades ===
==== To Jets ====
- Chris Ivory was traded from the New Orleans Saints to the Jets on April 26, 2013 in exchange for New York's fourth round selection (106th overall) in the 2013 NFL draft.

==== From Jets ====
- Darrelle Revis was traded to the Tampa Bay Buccaneers on April 21, 2013 in exchange for the Buccaneers' first round selection (13th overall) in the 2013 NFL draft and a conditional pick in the 2014 NFL draft.

=== Free Agents ===
Position	Player	Free agency tag	Date signed/released	2013 team	Notes
S	Yeremiah Bell	UFA	March 13, 2013	Arizona Cardinals	
TE	Jeff Cumberland	RFA	April 8, 2013	New York Jets	
DE	Mike DeVito	UFA	March 12, 2013	Kansas City Chiefs	
WR	Braylon Edwards	UFA	July 25, 2013	New York Jets	
TE	Dedrick Epps	ERFA	–	–	–
K	Nick Folk	UFA	March 16, 2013	New York Jets	
RB	Shonn Greene	UFA	March 13, 2013	Tennessee Titans	
FB	Lex Hilliard	UFA	March 13, 2013	New York Jets	
RT	Austin Howard	RFA	April 15, 2013	New York Jets	
TE	Dustin Keller	UFA	March 15, 2013	Miami Dolphins	
S	LaRon Landry	UFA	March 13, 2013	Indianapolis Colts	
LB	Josh Mauga	RFA	March 9, 2013	New York Jets	
RG	Brandon Moore	UFA	August 7, 2013	Retired	
LS	Tanner Purdum	RFA	March 18, 2013	New York Jets	
WR	Chaz Schilens	UFA	July 24, 2013	Detroit Lions	
LG	Matt Slauson	UFA	March 29, 2013	Chicago Bears	
LB	Bryan Thomas	UFA	–	–	–
CB	Isaiah Trufant	ERFA	March 24, 2013	New York Jets	
CB	Darrin Walls	ERFA	March 24, 2013	New York Jets	
WR	Jordan White	ERFA	March 24, 2013	New York Jets	

RFA: Restricted free agent, UFA: Unrestricted free agent, ERFA: Exclusive rights free agent, FT: Franchise tag

=== 2013 draft class ===
Round	Selection	Player	Position	College	Notes
1	9	Dee Milliner	CB	Alabama	
1	13	Sheldon Richardson	DT	Missouri	From Tampa Bay Buccaneers for Darrelle Revis.
2	39	Geno Smith	QB	West Virginia	
3	72	Brian Winters	G	Kent State	
4	106	Traded to the New Orleans Saints for RB Chris Ivory.			
5	141	Oday Aboushi	T	Virginia	
6	178	William Campbell	DT	Michigan	
7	215	Tommy Bohanon	FB	Wake Forest	

NOTES:

- The Jets were not awarded any compensatory selections in the 2013 NFL Draft.

== Preseason ==
Week	Date	Opponent	Result	Record	Venue	Recap
1	August 9	at Detroit Lions	L 17–26	0–1	Ford Field	Recap
2	August 17	Jacksonville Jaguars	W 37–13	1–1	MetLife Stadium	Recap
3	August 24	at New York Giants	W 24–21 (OT)	2–1	MetLife Stadium	Recap
4	August 29	Philadelphia Eagles	W 27–20	3–1	MetLife Stadium	Recap

== Regular season ==
=== Schedule ===
Week	Date	Opponent	Result	Record	Venue	Recap
1	September 8	Tampa Bay Buccaneers	**W** 18–17	1–0	MetLife Stadium	Recap
2	September 12	at **New England Patriots**	**L** 10–13	1–1	Gillette Stadium	Recap
3	September 22	**Buffalo Bills**	**W** 27–20	2–1	MetLife Stadium	Recap
4	September 29	at Tennessee Titans	**L** 13–38	2–2	LP Field	Recap
5	October 7	at Atlanta Falcons	**W** 30–28	3–2	Georgia Dome	Recap
6	October 13	Pittsburgh Steelers	**L** 6–19	3–3	MetLife Stadium	Recap
7	October 20	**New England Patriots**	**W** 30–27 (OT)	4–3	MetLife Stadium	Recap
8	October 27	at Cincinnati Bengals	**L** 9–49	4–4	Paul Brown Stadium	Recap
9	November 3	New Orleans Saints	**W** 26–20	5–4	MetLife Stadium	Recap
10	Bye					
11	November 17	at **Buffalo Bills**	**L** 14–37	5–5	Ralph Wilson Stadium	Recap
12	November 24	at Baltimore Ravens	**L** 3–19	5–6	M&T Bank Stadium	Recap
13	December 1	**Miami Dolphins**	**L** 3–23	5–7	MetLife Stadium	Recap
14	December 8	Oakland Raiders	**W** 37–27	6–7	MetLife Stadium	Recap
15	December 15	at Carolina Panthers	**L** 20–30	6–8	Bank of America Stadium	Recap
16	December 22	Cleveland Browns	**W** 24–13	7–8	MetLife Stadium	Recap
17	December 29	at **Miami Dolphins**	**W** 20–7	8–8	Sun Life Stadium	Recap

Note: Intra-division opponents are in bold text.

=== Game summaries ===
==== Week 1: vs. Tampa Bay Buccaneers ====
Week One: Tampa Bay Buccaneers at New York Jets – Game summary

Quarter	1	2	3	4	Total
Buccaneers	7	7	0	3	**17**
**Jets**	2	10	0	6	**18**

at MetLife Stadium, East Rutherford, New Jersey

- Date: September 8
- Game time: 1:00 p.m. EDT
- Game weather: 82 °F (28 °C), sunny
- Game attendance: 76,957
- Referee: Ed Hochuli
- TV announcers (Fox): Kevin Burkhardt, John Lynch and Erin Andrews
- Recap, Game book

Game information

**First quarter**

- NYJ – Josh Freeman fumble out of bounds in end zone for a safety, 8:35. Jets 2–0.
- TB – Mike Williams 17-yard pass from Josh Freeman (Rian Lindell kick), 1:07. Buccaneers 7–2. **Drive: 5 plays, 44 yards, 2:39.**

**Second quarter**

- NYJ – Nick Folk 43-yard field goal, 11:01. Buccaneers 7–5. **Drive: 13 plays, 55 yards, 5:06.**
- TB – Doug Martin 5-yard run (Rian Lindell kick), 6:46. Buccaneers 14–5. **Drive: 1 play, 5 yards, 0:05.**
- NYJ – Kellen Winslow 7-yard pass from Geno Smith (Nick Folk kick), 0:34. Buccaneers 14–12. **Drive: 6 plays, 31 yards, 1:59.**

**Third quarter**

- No scoring plays.

**Fourth quarter**

- NYJ – Nick Folk 30-yard field goal, 5:05. Jets 15–14. **Drive: 14 plays, 65 yards, 6:20.**
- TB – Rian Lindell 37-yard field goal, 0:34. Buccaneers 17–15. **Drive: 9 plays, 61 yards, 1:40.**
- NYJ – Nick Folk 48-yard field goal, 0:02. Jets 18–17. **Drive: 5 plays, 50 yards, 0:32.**

**Top passers**

- TB – Josh Freeman – 15/31, 210 yards, TD, INT
- NYJ – Geno Smith – 24/38, 256 yards, TD, INT

**Top rushers**

- TB – Doug Martin – 24 rushes, 65 yards, TD
- NYJ – Geno Smith – 6 rushes, 47 yards

**Top receivers**

- TB – Vincent Jackson – 7 receptions, 154 yards
- NYJ – Kellen Winslow – 7 receptions, 79 yards, TD

This game marked the debut of 2013 second-round draft pick QB Geno Smith from West Virginia. However, Smith only stepped in as QB due to incumbent starter Mark Sanchez suffering an apparent shoulder injury. Smith's first game didn't start off on the right foot, as he fumbled after taking a sack from Buccaneers MLB Mason Foster, and threw an interception to Buccaneers linebacker Lavonte David. Smith eventually rebounded by throwing his first career TD pass to Kellen Winslow Jr. to make the game close by halftime. The second half was a defensive struggle between both teams that wound up in both teams scoring in field goals. The biggest moment of the game came when Geno Smith scrambled out of bounds and Lavonte David (the same player who intercepted Smith earlier in the game) delivered a late hit to Smith in the last seconds of the game, resulting in a 15-yard unnecessary roughness penalty against David which pushed the Jets' position forward just enough to enable a successful 48-yard field goal from Nick Folk to secure victory.

With the win, the Jets improved to 1–0.

==== Week 2: at New England Patriots ====
Week Two: New York Jets at New England Patriots – Game summary

Quarter	1	2	3	4	Total
Jets	3	0	7	0	**10**
**Patriots**	10	3	0	0	**13**

at Gillette Stadium, Foxborough, Massachusetts

- Date: September 12
- Game time: 8:25 p.m. EDT
- Game weather: 72 °F (22 °C), cloudy, warm and humid
- Game attendance: 68,756
- Referee: Carl Cheffers
- TV announcers (NFLN): Brad Nessler, Mike Mayock and Alex Flanagan
- Recap, Game book

Game information

**First quarter**

- NE – Aaron Dobson 39-yard pass from Tom Brady (Stephen Gostkowski kick), 12:54. Patriots 7–0. **Drive: 6 plays, 81 yards, 2:06.**
- NE – Stephen Gostkowski 21-yard field goal, 9:17. Patriots 10–0. **Drive: 4 plays, 5 yards, 1:00.**
- NYJ – Nick Folk 37-yard field goal, 4:01. Patriots 10–3. **Drive: 11 plays, 61 yards, 5:16.**

**Second quarter**

- NE – Stephen Gostkowski 30-yard field goal, 5:05. Patriots 13–3. **Drive: 5 plays, 43 yards, 1:27.**

**Third quarter**

- NYJ – Bilal Powell 3-yard run (Nick Folk kick), 5:05. Patriots 13–10. **Drive: 9 plays, 58 yards, 5:00.**

**Fourth quarter**

- No scoring plays.

**Top passers**

- NYJ – Geno Smith – 15/35, 214 yards, 3 INT
- NE – Tom Brady – 19/39, 185 yards, TD

**Top rushers**

- NYJ – Chris Ivory – 12 rushes, 52 yards
- NE – Stevan Ridley – 16 rushes, 40 yards

**Top receivers**

- NYJ – Stephen Hill – 4 receptions, 86 yards
- NE – Julian Edelman – 13 receptions, 78 yards

Geno Smith had his worst game so far in his rookie season. After playing solidly in the first three quarters of the game against a mostly out-of-sync Patriots team (Tom Brady completed less than 50 percent of his passes for the first time since 2009), Geno Smith fell apart, throwing three interceptions in the fourth quarter alone; his third INT to Aqib Talib ultimately sealed the Jets' fate, as the Jets lost to the Patriots 13–10 in a sloppy matchup in Foxborough.

With the loss, the Jets fell to 1–1.

==== Week 3: vs. Buffalo Bills ====
Week Three: Buffalo Bills at New York Jets – Game summary

Quarter	1	2	3	4	Total
Bills	0	6	6	8	**20**
**Jets**	7	10	3	7	**27**

at MetLife Stadium, East Rutherford, New Jersey

- Date: September 22
- Game time: 4:25 p.m. EDT
- Game weather: 67 °F (19 °C), cloudy
- Game attendance: 76,957
- Referee: Scott Green
- TV announcers (CBS): Marv Albert and Rich Gannon
- Recap, Game book

Game information

**First quarter**

- NYJ – Geno Smith 8-yard run (Nick Folk kick), 9:06. Jets 7–0. **Drive: 12 plays, 80 yards, 5:54.**

**Second quarter**

- BUF – Dan Carpenter 37-yard field goal, 13:45. Jets 7–3. **Drive: 7 plays, 70 yards, 2:17.**
- BUF – Dan Carpenter 23-yard field goal 9:57. Jets 7–6. **Drive: 7 plays, 16 yards, 3:29.**
- NYJ – Stephen Hill 51-yard pass from Geno Smith (Nick Folk kick), 6:58. Jets 14–6. **Drive: 6 plays, 80 yards, 2:43.**
- NYJ – Nick Folk 47-yard field goal, 0:00. Jets 17–6. **Drive: 5 plays, 37 yards, 0:43.**

**Third quarter**

- NYJ – Nick Folk 34-yard field goal, 9:48. Jets 20–6. **Drive: 8 plays, 64 yards, 3:47.**
- BUF – Dan Carpenter 43-yard field goal, 8:18. Jets 20–9. **Drive: 7 plays, 55 yards, 1:30.**
- BUF – Dan Carpenter 26-yard field goal, 5:35. Jets 20–12. **Drive: 4 plays, 5 yards, 1:15.**

**Fourth quarter**

- BUF – Scott Chandler 33-yard pass from E.J. Manuel, (E. J. Manuel–Stevie Johnson pass), 10:39. Tied 20–20. **Drive: 6 plays, 80 yards, 2:43.**
- NYJ – Santonio Holmes 69-yard pass from Geno Smith (Nick Folk kick), 9:23. Jets 27–20. **Drive: 2 plays, 85 yards, 1:16.**

**Top passers**

- BUF – E.J. Manuel – 19/42, 243 yards, TD
- NYJ – Geno Smith – 16/29, 331 yards, 2 TD, 2 INT

**Top rushers**

- BUF – Fred Jackson – 7 rushes, 72 yards
- NYJ – Bilal Powell – 27 rushes, 149 yards

**Top receivers**

- BUF – Stevie Johnson – 6 receptions, 86 yards
- NYJ – Santonio Holmes – 5 receptions, 154 yards, TD

In a matchup of fellow rookie quarterbacks Geno Smith and E.J. Manuel, the game started off well for the Jets as Geno Smith ran in the end zone for a TD, and accounted for another on a long strike to Stephen Hill. The defense was stingy, holding off E.J. Manuel and the Bills offense throughout the game leading into the third quarter, and Nick Folk delivered two successful field goals to create a 20–6 cushion at the beginning of the 3rd quarter. However, it was to be acknowledged that the Jets committed a team-record 20 penalties for 168 yards, which helped the Bills get back into the game by the 4th quarter. Eventually, Geno Smith stepped up under pressure and delivered a game-winning, 69-yard TD to Santonio Holmes. As a result, the Jets proved that they can win in the face of adversity.

Bilal Powell had a good day, rushing 27 times for 149 rushing yards.

With the win, the Jets improved to 2–1.

==== Week 4: at Tennessee Titans ====
Week Four: New York Jets at Tennessee Titans – Game summary

Quarter	1	2	3	4	Total
Jets	0	6	0	7	**13**
**Titans**	10	14	0	14	**38**

at LP Field, Nashville, Tennessee

- Date: September 29
- Game time: 4:05 p.m. EDT/3:05 p.m. CDT
- Game weather: 74 °F (23 °C), cloudy
- Game attendance: 69,143
- Referee: Walt Anderson
- TV announcers (CBS): Greg Gumbel and Dan Dierdorf
- Recap, Game book

Game information

**First quarter**

- TEN – Delanie Walker 1-yard pass from Jake Locker (Rob Bironas kick), 11:57. Titans 7–0. **Drive: 5 plays, 18 yards, 2:19.**
- TEN – Rob Bironas 26-yard field goal, 4:20. Titans 10–0. **Drive: 11 plays, 67 yards, 6:04.**

**Second quarter**

- NYJ – Nick Folk 45-yard field goal, 14:55. Titans 10–3. **Drive: 10 plays, 63 yards, 4:25.**
- TEN – Nate Washington 4-yard pass from Jake Locker (Rob Bironas kick), 6:46. Titans 17–3. **Drive: 6 plays, 26 yards, 2:41.**
- NYJ – Nick Folk 47-yard field goal, 2:26. Titans 17–6. **Drive: 6 plays, 48 yards, 4:20.**
- TEN – Justin Hunter 16-yard pass from Jake Locker (Rob Bironas kick), 0:02. Titans 24–6. **Drive: 7 plays, 46 yards, 1:26.**

**Third quarter**

- No scoring plays.

**Fourth quarter**

- TEN – Karl Klug fumble recovery in the end zone (Rob Bironas kick), 11:45. Titans 31–6.
- NYJ – Jeff Cumberland 34-yard pass from Geno Smith (Nick Folk kick), 8:49. Titans 31–13. **Drive: 8 plays, 82 yards, 2:56.**
- TEN – Nate Washington 77-yard pass from Ryan Fitzpatrick (Rob Bironas kick), 7:06. Titans 38–13. **Drive: 3 plays, 80 yards, 1:43.**

**Top passers**

- NYJ – Geno Smith – 23/34, 289 yards, TD, 2 INT
- TEN – Jake Locker – 18/24, 149 yards, 3 TD

**Top rushers**

- NYJ – Bilal Powell – 14 rushes, 66 yards
- TEN – Jackie Battle – 11 rushes, 42 yards

**Top receivers**

- NYJ – Kellen Winslow – 6 receptions, 73 yards
- TEN – Kendall Wright – 5 receptions, 56 yards

This was the Jets' only game outside of the Eastern Time Zone during the 2013 season. Following three touchdown throws, the Jets sacked Jake Locker out of the game in the third quarter as Locker was sidelined the next two weeks with a hip injury. Geno Smith was picked off twice while in the fourth quarter he was sacked at his own goal line by Karl Klug; he attempted to switch the ball behind his back and Klug fell on the fumble for a touchdown.

With the loss, the Jets fell to 2–2.

==== Week 5: at Atlanta Falcons ====
Week Five: New York Jets at Atlanta Falcons – Game summary

Quarter	1	2	3	4	Total
**Jets**	3	14	3	10	**30**
Falcons	0	7	7	14	**28**

at Georgia Dome, Atlanta, Georgia

- Date: October 7
- Game time: 8:40 p.m. EDT
- Game weather: Played indoors (dome stadium)
- Game attendance: 70,246
- Referee: Bill Leavy
- TV announcers (ESPN): Mike Tirico, Jon Gruden and Lisa Salters
- Recap, Game book

The Jets traveled to Atlanta to take on a depleted Falcons team on Monday Night Football. The Jets grabbed a 27-14 lead in the fourth quarter but back to back Falcons touchdowns took them to a 28–27 lead on a Matt Bryant field goal with 1:54 remaining in the game. From there the Jets marched down the field on four Geno Smith completions, a Smith run, and two Bilal Powell runs; the resulting field goal from Nick Folk as time expired won it 30-28. With the win, the Jets improved to 3–2.

==== Week 6: vs. Pittsburgh Steelers ====
Week Six: Pittsburgh Steelers at New York Jets – Game summary

Quarter	1	2	3	4	Total
**Steelers**	0	9	7	3	**19**
Jets	3	3	0	0	**6**

at MetLife Stadium, East Rutherford, New Jersey

- Date: October 13
- Game time: 1:00 p.m. EDT
- Game weather: 62 °F (17 °C), cloudy
- Game attendance: 76,957
- Referee: Terry McAulay
- TV announcers (CBS): Jim Nantz, Phil Simms and Bill Cowher
- Recap, Game book

The Jets came back home to face the winless Pittsburgh Steelers. The Jets struggled all afternoon as they lost 19–6, giving the Steelers their first win of the season. With the loss, the Jets fell to 3–3, and also fell to 4–19 all time against the Steelers.

==== Week 7: vs. New England Patriots ====
Week Seven: New England Patriots at New York Jets – Game summary

Quarter	1	2	3	4	OT	Total
Patriots	14	7	0	6	0	**27**
**Jets**	7	3	17	0	3	**30**

at MetLife Stadium, East Rutherford, New Jersey

- Date: October 20
- Game time: 1:00 p.m. EDT
- Game weather: 63 °F (17 °C), sunny
- Game attendance: 76,957
- Referee: Jerome Boger
- TV announcers (CBS): Greg Gumbel and Dan Dierdorf
- Recap, Game book

This game is well known for an infamous penalty that occurred during the overtime period. The Jets were lining up for a game winning 56-yard field goal in overtime to try and give them the win. Nick Folk kicked the ball, but the kick went wide right and the Patriots appeared to be taking over with a chance to win. However, Chris Jones of New England was called for a controversial unsportsmanlike conduct penalty after pushing his teammate into the offensive line. This penalty was later named "leaping". The penalty gave the Jets a first down, giving them three more downs to push the field goal attempt closer. This time, Folk drilled the kick from 42 yards, and the Jets came away with a win that improved them to 4–3.

==== Week 8: at Cincinnati Bengals ====
Week Eight: New York Jets at Cincinnati Bengals – Game summary

Quarter	1	2	3	4	Total
Jets	0	6	3	0	**9**
**Bengals**	14	14	14	7	**49**

at Paul Brown Stadium, Cincinnati, Ohio

- Date: October 27
- Game time: 4:05 p.m. EDT
- Game weather: 57 °F (14 °C), sunny
- Game attendance: 62,576
- Referee: Pete Morelli
- TV announcers (CBS): Kevin Harlan and Solomon Wilcots
- Recap, Game book

The Jets were thoroughly embarrassed as Andy Dalton threw five touchdowns and Pacman Jones scored on a 60-yard interception. With the loss, the Jets fell to 4–4. They were also given their worst defeat since losing 45–3 to the Patriots in 2010.

==== Week 9: vs. New Orleans Saints ====
Week Nine: New Orleans Saints at New York Jets – Game summary

Quarter	1	2	3	4	Total
Saints	7	7	3	3	**20**
**Jets**	3	17	3	3	**26**

at MetLife Stadium, East Rutherford, New Jersey

- Date: November 3
- Game time: 1:00 p.m. EST
- Game weather: 48 °F (9 °C)
- Game attendance: 76,957
- Referee: Clete Blakeman
- TV announcers (Fox): Kevin Burkhardt, John Lynch and Erin Andrews
- Recap, Game book

Game information

**First quarter**

- NYJ – Nick Folk 39-yard field goal, 5:41. Jets 3–0. **Drive: 5 plays, 27 yards, 1:53.**
- NO – Jimmy Graham 51-yard pass from Drew Brees (Garrett Hartley kick), 2:45. Saints 7–3. **Drive: 6 plays, 81 yards, 2:56.**

**Second quarter**

- NYJ – Nick Folk 21-yard field goal, 10:04. Saints 7–6. **Drive: 11 plays, 93 yards, 4:56.**
- NO – Jimmy Graham 10-yard pass from Drew Brees (Garrett Hartley kick), 7:51. Saints 14–6. **Drive: 5 plays, 80 yards, 2:13.**
- NYJ – Chris Ivory 3-yard run (Nick Folk kick), 2:39. Saints 14–13. **Drive: 8 plays, 61 yards, 5:12.**
- NYJ – Geno Smith 3-yard run (Nick Folk kick), 0:37. Jets 20–14. **Drive: 5 plays, 39 yards, 1:35.**

**Third quarter**

- NYJ – Nick Folk 47-yard field goal, 11:57. Jets 23–14. **Drive: 7 plays, 50 yards, 3:03.**
- NO – Garrett Hartley 55-yard field goal, 1:46. Jets 23–17. **Drive: 9 plays, 34 yards, 5:00.**

**Fourth quarter**

- NYJ – Nick Folk 45-yard field goal, 11:56. Jets 26–17. **Drive: 8 plays, 53 yards, 4:50.**
- NO – Garrett Hartley 43-yard field goal, 3:06. Jets 26–20. **Drive: 11 plays, 60 yards, 3:06.**

**Top passers**

- NO – Drew Brees – 30/51, 382 yards, 2 TD, 2 INT
- NYJ – Geno Smith – 8/19, 115 yards

**Top rushers**

- NO – Pierre Thomas – 6 rushes, 24 yards
- NYJ – Chris Ivory – 18 rushes, 139 yards, TD

**Top receivers**

- NO – Jimmy Graham – 9 receptions, 116 yards, 2 TD
- NYJ – Greg Salas – 2 receptions, 57 yards

Rebounding from the embarrassing loss at Cincinnati, the Jets took down the 6–1 Saints, putting up 198 rushing yards while intercepting Drew Brees twice. Geno Smith completed just eight passes for 115 yards but rushed for 18 yards and a score.

==== Week 11: at Buffalo Bills ====
Week Eleven: New York Jets at Buffalo Bills – Game summary

Quarter	1	2	3	4	Total
Jets	0	0	7	7	**14**
**Bills**	0	20	14	3	**37**

at Ralph Wilson Stadium, Orchard Park, New York

- Date: November 17
- Game time: 1:00 p.m. EST
- Game weather: 62 °F (17 °C), cloudy
- Game attendance: 68,036
- Referee: Bill Leavy
- TV announcers (CBS): Ian Eagle and Dan Fouts
- Recap, Game book

After the win over the Saints, the Jets traveled to Buffalo to face the Bills. The Jets never led during the game, as the Bills commanded the game from start to finish, winning 37–14. Geno Smith was intercepted three times and ended up posting an overall passer rating of 10.1. With the loss, the Jets fell to 5–5.

==== Week 12: at Baltimore Ravens ====
Week Twelve: New York Jets at Baltimore Ravens – Game summary

Quarter	1	2	3	4	Total
Jets	3	0	0	0	**3**
**Ravens**	3	6	10	0	**19**

at M&T Bank Stadium, Baltimore, Maryland

- Date: November 24
- Game time: 1:00 p.m. EST
- Game weather: 33 °F (1 °C), partly cloudy, windy
- Game attendance: 71,148
- Referee: Jeff Triplette
- TV announcers (CBS): Greg Gumbel and Dan Dierdorf
- Recap, Game book

For the second time this season and second time against an AFC North opponent, the Jets failed to score a touchdown, as they lost 19–3 to the Baltimore Ravens. Geno Smith was intercepted twice and for the second straight week and third time in the last four, failed to throw a touchdown pass. With the loss, the Jets fell to 5–6.

==== Week 13: vs. Miami Dolphins ====
Week Thirteen: Miami Dolphins at New York Jets – Game summary

Quarter	1	2	3	4	Total
**Dolphins**	0	6	14	3	**23**
Jets	0	0	3	0	**3**

at MetLife Stadium, East Rutherford, New Jersey

- Date: December 1
- Game time: 1:00 p.m. EST
- Game weather: 48 °F (9 °C), partly cloudy
- Game attendance: 76,957
- Referee: Mike Carey
- TV announcers (CBS): Marv Albert and Rich Gannon
- Recap, Game book

For the second straight week, the Jets did not score a touchdown, as they managed only a field goal in a 23–3 loss to Miami. Geno Smith did not start in this game, as he was benched and replaced by Matt Simms. Simms did not do much of a better job, as he, like Smith, failed to throw a touchdown pass. Smith came in later on, but only went 4 for 10 throwing the ball and ended with a passer rating of 8.3. With the loss, the Jets fell to 5–7.

==== Week 14: vs. Oakland Raiders ====
Week Fourteen: Oakland Raiders at New York Jets – Game summary

Quarter	1	2	3	4	Total
Raiders	0	3	14	10	**27**
**Jets**	10	10	10	7	**37**

at MetLife Stadium, East Rutherford, New Jersey

- Date: December 8
- Game time: 1:00 p.m. EST
- Game weather: 33 °F (1 °C), cloudy
- Game attendance: 76,957
- Referee: Gene Steratore
- TV announcers (CBS): Marv Albert and Rich Gannon
- Recap, Game book

For the first time in two weeks, New York scored a touchdown. Geno Smith returned to action as starting quarterback and threw a touchdown pass and an interception as the Jets defeated the Oakland Raiders 37–27. With the win, the Jets improved to 6–7 and kept their slim playoff hopes alive.

==== Week 15: at Carolina Panthers ====
Week Fifteen: New York Jets at Carolina Panthers – Game summary

Quarter	1	2	3	4	Total
Jets	3	3	7	7	**20**
**Panthers**	3	13	0	14	**30**

at Bank of America Stadium, Charlotte, North Carolina

- Date: December 15
- Game time: 4:05 p.m. EST
- Game weather: 54 °F (12 °C), sunny
- Game attendance: 73,251
- Referee: Terry McAulay
- TV announcers (CBS): Greg Gumbel and Dan Dierdorf
- Recap, Game book

Game information

**First quarter**

- CAR – Graham Gano 35-yard field goal, 4:39. Panthers 3–0. **Drive: 9 plays, 50 yards, 4:37.**
- NYJ – Nick Folk 54-yard field goal, 0:00. Tied 3–3. **Drive: 10 plays, 44 yards, 4:39.**

**Second quarter**

- CAR – Graham Gano 22-yard field goal, 6:46. Panthers 6–3. **Drive: 15 plays, 85 yards, 8:14.**
- NYJ – Nick Folk 33-yard field goal, 3:49. Tied 6–6. **Drive: 9 plays, 65 yards, 2:54.**
- CAR – Deangelo Williams 72-yard pass from Cam Newton (Graham Gano kick), 3:29. Panthers 13–6. **Drive: 1 play, 72 yards, 0:20.**
- CAR – Graham Gano 40-yard field goal, 0:08. Panthers 16–6. **Drive: 6 plays, 34 yards, 2:00.**

**Third quarter**

- NYJ – Sheldon Richardson 1-yard run (Nick Folk kick), 3:04. Panthers 16–13. **Drive: 9 plays, 86 yards, 4:46.**

**Fourth quarter**

- CAR – Mike Tolbert 1-yard run (Graham Gano kick), 11:05. Panthers 23–13. **Drive: 4 plays, 14 yards, 1:45.**
- CAR – Captain Munnerlyn 41-yard interception return (Graham Gano kick), 8:17. Panthers 30–13.
- NYJ – Jeff Cumberland 8-yard pass from Geno Smith (Nick Folk kick), 3:50. Panthers 30–20. **Drive: 12 plays, 72 yards, 4:27.**

**Top passers**

- NYJ – Geno Smith – 15/28, 167 yards, TD, INT
- CAR – Cam Newton – 16/24, 273 yards, TD

**Top rushers**

- NYJ – Chris Ivory – 11 rushes, 66 yards
- CAR – Deangelo Williams – 15 rushes, 81 yards

**Top receivers**

- NYJ – Bilal Powell – 4 receptions, 19 yards
- CAR – Greg Olsen – 5 receptions, 88 yards

With the loss, the Jets fell to 6–8, and were mathematically eliminated from playoff contention for the third straight season after the Ravens defeated the Lions the following Monday night, therefore rendering them unable to play on their home turf in the Super Bowl. The Jets were seeking their first win in Charlotte since 2001.

==== Week 16: vs. Cleveland Browns ====
Week Sixteen: Cleveland Browns at New York Jets – Game summary

Quarter	1	2	3	4	Total
Browns	3	7	0	3	**13**
**Jets**	0	10	0	14	**24**

at MetLife Stadium, East Rutherford, New Jersey

- Date: December 22
- Game time: 1:00 p.m. EST
- Game weather: 70 °F (21 °C), cloudy
- Game attendance: 76,957
- Referee: Pete Morelli
- TV announcers (CBS): Marv Albert and Rich Gannon
- Recap, Game book

In a game that had no impact on the AFC playoff picture, the Jets managed a 24–13 win over the Cleveland Browns. Geno Smith committed no turnovers and threw two touchdowns in the win, which improved the Jets to 7–8.

==== Week 17: at Miami Dolphins ====
Week Seventeen: New York Jets at Miami Dolphins – Game summary

Quarter	1	2	3	4	Total
**Jets**	0	14	0	6	**20**
Dolphins	0	7	0	0	**7**

at Sun Life Stadium, Miami Gardens, Florida

- Date: December 29
- Game time: 1:00 p.m. EST
- Game weather: 79 °F (26 °C), cloudy
- Game attendance: 70,296
- Referee: Jerome Boger
- TV announcers (CBS): Greg Gumbel and Dan Dierdorf
- Recap, Game book

The Jets traveled to Miami to end their season. The Jets beat Miami 20–7 to end the Dolphins playoff hopes. Geno Smith did not throw a touchdown, but he also did not turn it over. The Jets forced three Miami turnovers in the game. With the win, the Jets ended their season at an even 8–8. It was also the Jets’ 13th win against the Dolphins in their last 24 meetings and seventh in that span at Joe Robbie Stadium.

=== Standings ===
==== Division ====
AFC East
	W	L	T	PCT	DIV	CONF	PF	PA	STK
^{(2)} New England Patriots	12	4	0	.750	4–2	9–3	444	338	W2
New York Jets	8	8	0	.500	3–3	5–7	290	387	W2
Miami Dolphins	8	8	0	.500	2–4	7–5	317	335	L2
Buffalo Bills	6	10	0	.375	3–3	5–7	339	388	L1

==== Conference ====
AFC
#	Team	Division	W	L	T	PCT	DIV	CONF	SOS	SOV	STK
**Division winners**
1	Denver Broncos	West	13	3	0	.813	5–1	9–3	.469	.423	W2
2	New England Patriots	East	12	4	0	.750	4–2	9–3	.473	.427	W2
3 (Note: Cincinnati defeated Indianapolis head-to-head (Week 14, 42–28).)	Cincinnati Bengals	North	11	5	0	.688	3–3	8–4	.480	.494	W2
4	Indianapolis Colts	South	11	5	0	.688	6–0	9–3	.484	.449	W3
**Wild cards**
5	Kansas City Chiefs	West	11	5	0	.688	2–4	7–5	.445	.335	L2
6	San Diego Chargers	West	9	7	0	.563	4–2	6–6	.496	.549	W4
**Did not qualify for the postseason**
7 (Note: Pittsburgh finished with a better division record than Baltimore.) (Note: Pittsburgh defeated the New York Jets head-to-head (Week 6, 19–6).)	Pittsburgh Steelers	North	8	8	0	.500	4–2	6–6	.469	.441	W3
8 (Note: Baltimore defeated the New York Jets head-to-head (Week 12, 19–3).)	Baltimore Ravens	North	8	8	0	.500	3–3	6–6	.484	.418	L2
9 (Note: The New York Jets finished with a better division record than Miami.)	New York Jets	East	8	8	0	.500	3–3	5–7	.488	.414	W2
10	Miami Dolphins	East	8	8	0	.500	2–4	7–5	.523	.523	L2
11	Tennessee Titans	South	7	9	0	.438	2–4	6–6	.504	.375	W2
12	Buffalo Bills	East	6	10	0	.375	3–3	5–7	.520	.500	L1
13 (Note: Oakland and Jacksonville finished with a better conference record than Cleveland.) (Note: Oakland defeated Jacksonville head-to-head (Week 2, 19–9).)	Oakland Raiders	West	4	12	0	.250	1–5	4–8	.523	.359	L6
14 (Note: Jacksonville defeated Cleveland head-to-head (Week 13, 32–28).)	Jacksonville Jaguars	South	4	12	0	.250	3–3	4–8	.504	.234	L3
15	Cleveland Browns	North	4	12	0	.250	2–4	3–9	.516	.477	L7
16	Houston Texans	South	2	14	0	.125	1–5	2–10	.559	.500	L14
**Tiebreakers** (Note: When breaking ties for three or more teams under the NFL's rules, they are first broken within divisions, then comparing only the highest ranked remaining team from each division.)

== Staff ==
2013 New York Jets staff
Front office: Chairman/CEO – Woody Johnson; President – Neil Glat; General manager – John Idzik; Senior director of football administration – Rod Graves; Manager of football administration – Jacqueline Davidson; Director of pro personnel – Brendan Phophett; Assistant director of pro personnel – Matt Bazirgan; Senior director of college scouting – Terry Bradway; Director of college scouting – Jeff Bauer; Head coaches: Head coach – Rex Ryan; Assistant head coach/running backs – Anthony Lynn; Offensive coaches: Offensive coordinator – Marty Mornhinweg; Quarterbacks – David Lee; Wide receivers – Sanjay Lal; Tight ends – Steve Hagen; Offensive line – Mike Devlin; Assistant offensive line – Ron Heller; Offensive intern – Tony Sparano Jr	Defensive coaches: Defensive coordinator – Dennis Thurman; Defensive line – Karl Dunbar; Assistant defensive line/linebackers – Jeff Weeks; Linebackers – Brian VanGorder; Defensive backs/secondary – Tim McDonald; Assistant defensive backs – Brian Smith; Defensive quality control – Bobby April III; Training camp intern – Daylon McCutcheon; Special teams coaches: Special teams coordinator – Ben Kotwica; Assistant special teams – Louie Aguiar; Strength and conditioning: Head strength and conditioning – Justus Galac; Assistant strength and conditioning – Paul Ricci; Assistant strength and conditioning – Pierre Ngo

== Final roster ==
2013 New York Jets roster
Quarterbacks (QB): 4 David Garrard; 5 Matt Simms; 7 Geno Smith; Running backs (RB): 40 Tommy Bohanon; 25 Alex Green; 33 Chris Ivory; 29 Bilal Powell; 24 Darius Reynaud; Wide receivers (WR): 15 Saalim Hakim; 10 Santonio Holmes; 11 Jeremy Kerley; 86 David Nelson; 17 Greg Salas; Tight ends (TE): 87 Jeff Cumberland; 83 Chris Pantale; 82 Zach Sudfeld; 81 Kellen Winslow II	Offensive linemen (OL): 75 Oday Aboushi G; 65 William Campbell T; 66 Willie Colon G; 62 Vladimir Ducasse G; 60 D'Brickashaw Ferguson T; 77 Austin Howard T; 71 Ben Ijalana T; 74 Nick Mangold C; 72 Caleb Schlauderaff G; 67 Brian Winters G; Defensive linemen (DL): 78 Leger Douzable DE; 93 Kenrick Ellis NT; 94 Damon Harrison NT; 91 Sheldon Richardson DE; 96 Muhammad Wilkerson DE	Linebackers (LB): 54 Nick Bellore ILB; 98 Quinton Coples OLB; 55 Jermaine Cunningham OLB; 56 Demario Davis ILB; 52 David Harris ILB; 50 Garrett McIntyre OLB; 97 Calvin Pace OLB; Defensive backs (DB): 39 Antonio Allen FS; 32 Josh Bush SS; 31 Antonio Cromartie CB; 37 Jaiquawn Jarrett FS; 26 Dawan Landry SS; 21 Ellis Lankster CB; 27 Dee Milliner CB; 22 Ed Reed FS; 35 Isaiah Trufant CB; 30 Darrin Walls CB; 20 Kyle Wilson CB; Special teams (ST): 2 Nick Folk K; 46 Tanner Purdum LS; 1 Ryan Quigley P	Practice squad: 99 T. J. Barnes NT; 18 Michael Campbell WR; 34 Ras-I Dowling CB; 92 Tevita Finau DE; 63 Dalton Freeman C; 57 Tim Fugger LB; 14 Dwight Jones WR; 45 Rontez Miles S; Reserve: 95 Antwan Barnes OLB (IR); 22 Aaron Berry CB (IR); 16 Josh Cribbs WR (IR); 58 Troy Davis OLB (IR); 19 Clyde Gates WR (IR); 23 Mike Goodson RB (IR); -- John Griffin RB (IR); 18 Vidal Hazelton WR (IR); 84 Stephen Hill WR (IR); 36 Lex Hilliard FB (IR); 53 Josh Mauga ILB (IR); 88 Konrad Reuland TE (IR); 6 Mark Sanchez QB (IR); Rookies in italics 53 active, 13 reserve, 8 practice squad
