= Rontez Miles =

American football player (born 1988)

No. 45
- Position: Safety

Personal information
- Born: November 25, 1988 (age 37); Braddock, Pennsylvania, U.S.
- Listed height: 6 ft 0 in (1.83 m)
- Listed weight: 203 lb (92 kg)

Career information
- High school: Woodland Hills (Churchill, Pennsylvania)
- College: California (PA)
- NFL draft: 2013: undrafted

Career history
- New York Jets (2013–2019)

Career NFL statistics
- Total tackles: 123
- Forced fumbles: 2
- Pass deflections: 1
- Interceptions: 1
- Stats at Pro Football Reference

Rontez Lamotte Miles (born November 25, 1988) is an American former professional football player who was a safety in the National Football League (NFL). He was signed by the Jets as an undrafted free agent in 2013. He played college football for the California Vulcans.

== Early life ==
Miles attended Woodland Hills High School in Pennsylvania. He was teammates with future NFL'ers Rob Gronkowski and Monte Simmons. He was also a three-year letterman, two-time all-conference and Big 33 while at Woodland Hills.

== College career ==
=== Freshman season ===
On November 11, 2009, he was named the PSAC West Freshman of the Year. On November 18, 2009, he was selected to the PSAC West Second-team.

=== Sophomore season ===
He was selected to the Football Gazette Third-team All-Region team. He was also selected to the All-PSAC West First-team.

=== Junior season ===
On August 22, 2011, he was selected to the preseason D2Football.com First-team All-American team. He was selected to the AFCA First-team All-American and AP First-team All-American team. He was named to the 2011 All-PSAC West First-team. He selected to the All-American, Don Hansen Second-team All-American, Daktronics First-team All-Region and Don Hansen First-team All-Region team following the conclusion of his Junior season. On November 16, 2011, he was selected as the PSAC West Defensive Player of the Year. He was selected as the Daktronics Super Region 1 Defensive Player of the Year.

=== Senior season ===
Prior to his Senior year, he was selected to the Preseason Lindy's First-team All-American and Preseason Beyond Sport Network (BSN) First-team All-American team.

== Professional career ==
Pre-draft measurables
| Height | Weight | Arm length | Hand span | 40-yard dash | 20-yard shuttle | Three-cone drill | Vertical jump | Broad jump |
|---|---|---|---|---|---|---|---|---|
| 5 ft 11 5/8 in (1.82 m) | 203 lb (92 kg) | 32 7/8 in (0.84 m) | 10 1/4 in (0.26 m) | 4.62 s | 4.27 s | 6.97 s | 36.5 in (0.93 m) | 10 ft 3 in (3.12 m) |
All values from the NFL Combine

On April 27, 2013, he signed with the New York Jets as an undrafted free agent. He was released on August 31, and signed to the team's practice squad a day later. He was promoted to the active roster on November 1, but released 10 days later after suspended tight end Kellen Winslow II returned to the active roster. Miles was re-signed to the practice squad on November 13.

Rontez was released on August 30, 2014, and signed to the team's practice squad a day later. He was promoted to the Jets' active roster before their Week 17 season finale, and, according to former head coach Rex Ryan, Miles was going to play a role on special teams. However, he suffered a leg injury in practice, after colliding with Marcus Williams. Miles was placed on injured reserve after undergoing surgery on December 26.

On December 6, 2015, Miles recorded his first career interception against New York Giants quarterback Eli Manning on fourth down in the 4th quarter, which helped the team come back from a ten-point deficit in their overtime win against the New York Giants.

On March 14, 2018, the Jets placed a second-round restricted free agent tender on Miles. He re-signed for one year and just over $1 million, and later had surgery related to a torn meniscus. He was placed on the physically unable to perform list on September 1 to start the season, due to the knee surgery. He was activated off PUP on November 2, while the Jets waived newly-acquired safety Ibraheim Campbell.

On November 6, 2019, Miles was placed on injured reserve with neck and hip injuries.

== NFL career statistics ==
Legend
| **Bold** | Career high |

| Year | Team | Games | | Tackles | | | | | Interceptions | | | | | Fumbles | | | |
| Year | Team | GP | GS | Cmb | Solo | Ast | Sck | TFL | Int | Yds | TD | Lng | PD | FF | FR | Yds | TD |
|---|---|---|---|---|---|---|---|---|---|---|---|---|---|---|---|---|---|
| 2013 | NYJ | 1 | 0 | 0 | 0 | 0 | 0.0 | 0 | 0 | 0 | 0 | 0 | 0 | 0 | 0 | 0 | 0 |
| 2015 | NYJ | 9 | 1 | 24 | 15 | 9 | 0.0 | 0 | **1** | **11** | 0 | **11** | **1** | 0 | 0 | 0 | 0 |
| 2016 | NYJ | **16** | **4** | **57** | **34** | **23** | 0.0 | 0 | 0 | 0 | 0 | 0 | 0 | **2** | 0 | 0 | 0 |
| 2017 | NYJ | 13 | 0 | 24 | 21 | 3 | 0.0 | 0 | 0 | 0 | 0 | 0 | 0 | 0 | 0 | 0 | 0 |
| 2018 | NYJ | 8 | 1 | 11 | 10 | 1 | 0.0 | 0 | 0 | 0 | 0 | 0 | 0 | 0 | 0 | 0 | 0 |
| 2019 | NYJ | 7 | 0 | 7 | 3 | 4 | 0.0 | 0 | 0 | 0 | 0 | 0 | 0 | 0 | 0 | 0 | 0 |
| | | 54 | 6 | 123 | 83 | 40 | 0.0 | 0 | 1 | 11 | 0 | 11 | 1 | 2 | 0 | 0 | 0 |
