= Füger =

Füger is a surname. Notable people with the surname include:

- Friedrich Füger (1751–1818), German classicism portrait and historical painter
- Kaspar Füger (also Caspar, c. 1521, after 1592) German Lutheran pastor and hymn writer
- Frederick Füger (1836–1913), enlisted man and officer in the U.S. Army, Awarded Medal of Honor at Battle of Gettysburg
- Stanley T Fuger, Jr. (1950-), Superior Court Judge, State of Connecticut

See also: Fugger (disambiguation)
