= Fugger (disambiguation) =

The Fugger family was a prominent group of European bankers in the fifteenth- and sixteenth-century.

Fugger may also refer to:

- an epithet for Mohamed Al-Fayed in a recurring joke in Private Eye
- Tim Fugger (born 1989), American football player
