= Kellen Winslow II =

American football player (born 1983)

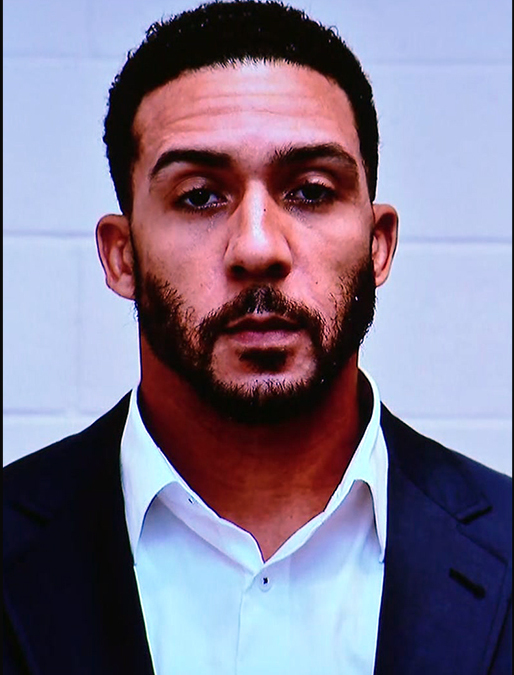
- Winslow's mugshot, c. 2018-2019

No. 80, 82, 81
- Position: Tight end

Personal information
- Born: July 21, 1983 (age 43); San Diego, California, U.S.
- Listed height: 6 ft 4 in (1.93 m)
- Listed weight: 240 lb (109 kg)

Career information
- High school: Scripps Ranch (San Diego)
- College: Miami (FL) (2001–2003)
- NFL draft: 2004: 1st round, 6th overall pick

Career history
- Cleveland Browns (2004–2008); Tampa Bay Buccaneers (2009–2011); Seattle Seahawks (2012)*; New England Patriots (2012); New York Jets (2013)
- * Offseason or practice squad member only

Awards and highlights
- Pro Bowl (2007); BCS national champion (2001); John Mackey Award (2003); Unanimous All-American (2003); Second-team All-American (2002); First-team All-Big East (2003)

Career NFL statistics
- Receptions: 469
- Receiving yards: 5,236
- Receiving touchdowns: 25
- Stats at Pro Football Reference

Kellen Boswell Winslow II (born July 21, 1983) is an American former professional football player who was a tight end in the National Football League (NFL) for 10 seasons. The son of Pro Football Hall of Fame tight end Kellen Winslow, he played college football for the Miami Hurricanes, he won the John Mackey Award and earned unanimous All-American in 2003. He was selected sixth overall by the Cleveland Browns in the 2004 NFL draft.

Winslow received Pro Bowl honors in 2007 with the Browns, but his tenure was marked by injuries and conflict with management, leading to his departure after five years. He spent his next three seasons with the Tampa Bay Buccaneers. Winslow last played for the New England Patriots and New York Jets for one season each. In 2019, Winslow pleaded guilty to rape and sexual battery, and was sentenced in 2021 to 14 years in prison.

== Early life ==
Winslow was born in San Diego, California, the son of San Diego Chargers tight end Kellen Winslow, a member of the Pro Football Hall of Fame. He attended Patrick Henry High School, in San Diego, for his freshmen and sophomore years of high school and Scripps Ranch High School for his junior and senior years.

== College career ==
Winslow enrolled at the University of Miami, where he played for coach Larry Coker's Miami Hurricanes football team from 2001 to 2003.

During his freshman season, in 2001, he backed up All-American tight end Jeremy Shockey and played largely on special teams, and was one of four true freshmen to play for the Hurricanes' 2001 BCS National Championship team; the three others were future NFL players Frank Gore, Antrel Rolle, and Sean Taylor.

After Shockey's departure for the 2002 NFL draft, Winslow became the starter at tight end and was named a finalist for the Mackey Award and named a first-team All-American by CNNSI.com, setting University of Miami records for a tight end with 57 receptions for 726 yards and eight touchdowns. His best game came during the 2003 Fiesta Bowl, which was the site of the BCS National Championship game that year, in which he caught 11 passes for 122 yards and one touchdown in the Hurricanes 31–24 loss to Ohio State Buckeyes.

=== "I'm a Soldier" controversy ===
Winslow received national attention following a 2003 University of Miami game with the Tennessee Volunteers. Eighteenth-ranked Tennessee defeated No. 6 Miami on the Hurricanes home field by a score of 10–6. During a sweep play for Miami wide receiver/cornerback Devin Hester, Winslow blocked two Volunteers, effectively taking both defenders out of the play. When questioned during the media session following the game, Winslow referred to himself as "a ... [sic] soldier", despite never serving in the military. He later apologized for the remarks.

Despite a slight drop in production during his junior season, in which Winslow caught 60 passes for 605 yards and one touchdown, he won the John Mackey Award as the nation's best collegiate tight end, and was recognized as a unanimous first-team All-American, after receiving first-team honors from the Associated Press and other national selector organizations. After the season, Winslow decided to forgo his senior season and declared himself eligible for the 2004 NFL draft.

== Professional career ==
Pre-draft measurables
Height	Weight	Arm length	Hand span	40-yard dash	20-yard shuttle	Three-cone drill	Vertical jump	Broad jump	Bench press
6 ft 3 7/8 in (1.93 m)	243 lb (110 kg)	32 1/8 in (0.82 m)	9 7/8 in (0.25 m)	4.55 s	4.10 s	6.71 s	33.5 in (0.85 m)	10 ft 1 in (3.07 m)	24 reps
All values are from NFL Combine/Pro Day

=== Cleveland Browns ===
Winslow was drafted by the Cleveland Browns with the sixth pick in the first round of the 2004 NFL draft, making him the highest-selected tight end in more than 30 years. Cleveland head coach Butch Davis was also the coach who recruited Winslow to the University of Miami before leaving for the NFL prior to ever coaching Winslow in college.

==== 2004 leg injury ====
Winslow was expected to give the Cleveland offense an immediate boost. Two games into his rookie season, however, he suffered a broken right fibula, which cost him $5.3 million in incentive bonuses. The injury kept him on the sidelines for the remainder of the year after having only recorded five catches for 50 yards. After two operations on the injured leg, Winslow made a complete recovery.

==== 2005 motorcycle accident ====
On May 1, 2005, Winslow suffered another leg injury when he was thrown from his Suzuki GSX-R750 motorcycle while riding in the Cleveland suburb of Westlake. Winslow sustained a torn anterior cruciate ligament in his right knee and was placed on the "Physically Unable-to-Perform (Non Football Injury)" list for the 2005 season. Winslow later had a six-week staph infection that resulted from the injury.

==== 2006 season ====
Winslow attended the Browns' 2006 training camp and pronounced himself ready to play. The Associated Press reported in August 2006 that Winslow said that, even at 90 percent, he was superior to every other NFL tight end. "I hate to be brash", Winslow said. "But I think my 90 percent is still better than every tight end out there."

In the opening game of the 2006 NFL season against the New Orleans Saints, Winslow recorded his first NFL touchdown, scoring on an 18-yard pass from quarterback Charlie Frye. Winslow emerged as a reliable target for Cleveland, finishing the year with 89 receptions, the most at his position on the season, which also tied Ozzie Newsome's all-time franchise record for receptions in a season. Winslow underwent microfracture surgery on his right knee January 31, 2007, at the Cleveland Clinic in an attempt to further repair cartilage damage sustained in the motorcycle accident in 2005.

==== 2007 season ====
Winslow had a successful season and finished with 82 receptions for 1,106 yards and five touchdowns. On December 18, Winslow was named as a first alternate for the 2008 Pro Bowl. On February 4, Antonio Gates of the San Diego Chargers announced he would not be attending the Pro Bowl due to injury. This paved the way for Winslow to make his first trip to the Pro Bowl. Winslow was one of 6 Browns selected for the Pro Bowl that season.

The Browns also had their most successful season in recent memory. For the first time since 1994, Cleveland had double-digit wins with a 10–6 record. The Browns narrowly missed 2007–08 NFL playoffs and were the only 9+ win team not to qualify for the NFL's postseason tournament.

==== 2008 season ====
During the 2008 season, Winslow was hospitalized with a staph infection. Winslow then openly criticized former GM Phil Savage about not fixing the infection problem (the Browns had seven cases of staph infection in the last few years), and trying to hide the injury. Savage responded by suspending him for a week; owner Randy Lerner later apologized to Winslow and rescinded the suspension.

=== Tampa Bay Buccaneers ===
Winslow was traded to the Tampa Bay Buccaneers on February 27, 2009, for their 2nd-round pick in the 2009 NFL draft and their 5th-round pick in the 2010 NFL draft. He received the biggest contract for a tight end in NFL history with a 6-year, $36 million deal.

==== 2009 season ====
Winslow went on to a record-breaking season with the Buccaneers in his first year with the team, including single-season franchise records for a tight end in receptions (77) and receiving yards (884). His 77 catches led the team that season.

==== 2010 season ====
In his second year with the Buccaneers, he led the team in receptions with 66, for 730 yards and scored 5 touchdowns. The Bucs finished 10–6 in a rugged NFC South that included the Atlanta Falcons, who finished 13–3, and the New Orleans Saints, who finished 11–5. The division was the only one in the NFL to have three teams post double-digit wins in 2010. However, the Bucs narrowly missed the 2010–11 NFL playoffs. The Green Bay Packers, who had an identical 10–6 record, went on to win the Super Bowl that year.

==== 2011 season ====
Once again Winslow led the team in receptions in his third season with the Buccaneers, recording 75 receptions for 763 receiving yards and 2 touchdowns.

Despite a strong outing in 2010 and a strong start in 2011, the Bucs finished 4–12.

On May 21, 2012, Winslow announced that the Buccaneers had informed him that he would either be traded or released. It was also reported that Winslow had been directed not to attend organized team activities ('OTAs') while a trade was pursued, contradicting earlier reports that Winslow refused to participate in OTAs.

=== Seattle Seahawks ===
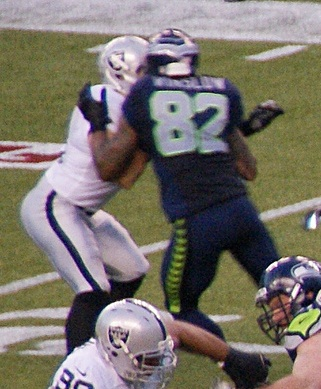
Winslow (No. 82) with the Seattle Seahawks in August 2012

Winslow was traded to the Seattle Seahawks on May 22, 2012. On September 1, 2012, he was released by the Seahawks after declining to reduce his salary.

=== New England Patriots ===
Winslow signed with the New England Patriots on September 18, 2012. He then asked for his release and was granted it on September 27, 2012, after only playing in one game.

=== New York Jets ===
Winslow was invited to attend the New York Jets' mini-camp for a three-day tryout. Winslow subsequently signed a one-year contract on June 14, 2013, after general manager John Idzik and head coach Rex Ryan praised Winslow's performance. On October 11, 2013, Winslow was suspended for four games for violating the NFL's policy on performance-enhancing substances.

=== Comeback attempt ===
In 2016, Winslow attempted a comeback after sitting out for over two years. He had a workout with the Green Bay Packers in August but was not offered a contract.

Winslow participated in The Spring League in 2017 and 2018.

== NFL career statistics ==
Legend
**Bold**	Career high

Year	Team	Games		Receiving					Fumbles	
Year	Team	GP	GS	Rec	Yds	Avg	Lng	TD	Fum	Lost
2004	CLE	2	2	5	50	10.0	21	0	0	0
2005	CLE	0	0	Did not play due to injury						
2006	CLE	16	16	**89**	875	9.8	40	3	1	0
2007	CLE	16	14	82	**1,106**	**13.5**	**49**	**5**	**2**	**1**
2008	CLE	10	8	43	428	10.0	30	3	1	**1**
2009	TB	16	14	77	884	11.5	42T	**5**	0	0
2010	TB	16	11	66	730	11.1	41T	**5**	1	0
2011	TB	16	15	75	763	10.2	37	2	**2**	**1**
2012	NE	1	0	1	12	12.0	12	0	0	0
2013	NYJ	12	3	31	388	12.5	34	2	0	0
Career		105	83	469	5,236	11.2	49	25	7	3

== Personal life ==
He was married on June 15, 2006, to Janelle Winslow. The couple welcomed their first son Jalen in February 2011, and a daughter, Juliana, in August 2013. In August 2019, Janelle filed for divorce, citing irreconcilable differences.

On October 17, 2006, Kellen's half-brother Justin Winslow died, although no cause of death was reported; he was 23 years of age and was found unconscious by his mother. Kellen II and Justin are the only sons of Hall of Fame tight end Kellen Winslow.

== Legal history ==
Winslow was charged with drug possession in January 2014 and received a conditional discharge without a guilty finding in the synthetic marijuana case.

On June 7, 2018, Winslow was arrested fleeing a mobile home park in Encinitas, California. He was charged with felony first degree burglary and held on $50,000 bond. Winslow was arrested on June 14, 2018, on charges of kidnapping and rape. In July, a judge ordered Winslow to stand trial for kidnapping and raping two women. Winslow was placed on house arrest with GPS monitoring after posting $2 million bail. In a separate case that month, he was also charged with raping an unconscious 17-year-old girl in 2003, when he was 19.

On March 4, 2019, Winslow's bail was revoked, and he was jailed after being arraigned on two new counts of lewd conduct, and one count each of battery of an elder and willful cruelty to an elder, all misdemeanors, that he allegedly committed in Carlsbad, California, in February 2019. He was convicted of rape, a lewd act in public conduct and indecent exposure on June 10, 2019. He was also acquitted on another lewd act in public charge, and the judge sent the jury back to consider verdicts on all of the other charges. The following day, a mistrial was declared on the remaining eight charges. Prosecutors announced on June 14 that Winslow would be retried on the eight charges, with his second trial set to begin on September 30.

On November 4, 2019, Winslow pleaded guilty to the rape of an unconscious teen and sexual battery on a 54-year-old hitchhiker as part of a plea deal. In exchange for his guilty plea at San Diego County Superior Court, the court agreed to sentence him to between 12 and 18 years in prison, rather than life imprisonment if he was convicted in the retrial. As part of the agreement, he will automatically be on lifetime parole immediately upon release, and he waived his right to ever appeal any conviction or verdict in either trial. Winslow's defense attorney said that his client suffered from frontal lobe damage and possible chronic traumatic encephalopathy (CTE). While CTE could not be used as a defense in the trial, brain trauma was cited by his attorneys in requesting the minimum 12-year sentence. A clinical psychologist stated that Winslow had symptoms that were consistent with CTE. His sentencing was scheduled for March 18, 2020, but was postponed indefinitely due to the COVID-19 pandemic.

On February 19, 2021, Winslow agreed and accepted a 14-year prison sentence for one count of rape and two counts of assault, and was sentenced on March 3, 2021. As of October 2023, Winslow is currently incarcerated at California Correctional Institution in Tehachapi, California.
