= Greg McElroy =

American football player and commentator (born 1988)

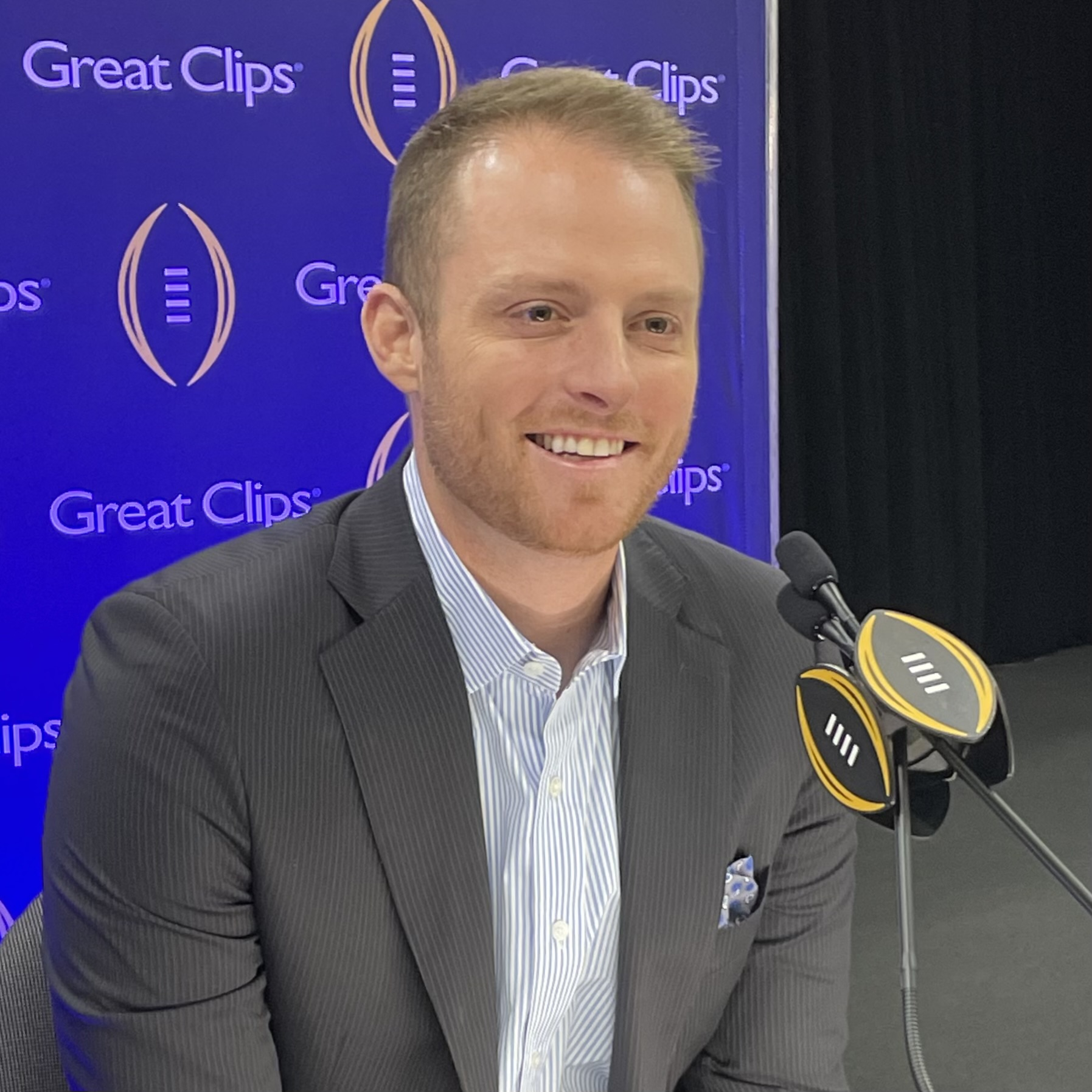
- McElroy in 2024

No. 14
- Position: Quarterback

Personal information
- Born: May 10, 1988 (age 38); Los Angeles, California, U.S.
- Listed height: 6 ft 2 in (1.88 m)
- Listed weight: 225 lb (102 kg)

Career information
- High school: Southlake Carroll (Southlake, Texas)
- College: Alabama (2007–2010)
- NFL draft: 2011: 7th round, 208th overall pick

Career history
- New York Jets (2011–2012); Cincinnati Bengals (2013)*
- * Offseason or practice squad member only

Awards and highlights
- BCS national champion (2010)

Career NFL statistics
- Passing attempts: 31
- Passing completions: 19
- Completion percentage: 61.3%
- Passing yards: 214
- TD–INT: 1–1
- Passer rating: 79.2
- Stats at Pro Football Reference

Gregory Vincent McElroy Jr. (born May 10, 1988) is an American football commentator and former quarterback in the National Football League (NFL). He was selected by the New York Jets in the seventh round of the 2011 NFL draft after playing college football for the Alabama Crimson Tide. During his high school career, McElroy won several awards including being named an EA Sports All-American and winning a Texas 5A state championship for Southlake Carroll. He was the starting quarterback for the Crimson Tide football team. As a junior, he led the Crimson Tide to an undefeated 14–0 season, which included the 2009 SEC Championship and BCS National Championship.

Since retiring from the NFL in 2014, McElroy has worked as a college football analyst for ESPN and ABC.

== Early life ==
McElroy was born in Los Angeles, California to Greg and Jami McElroy. In 1998, when he was 10 years old, his father was hired by the Dallas Cowboys to oversee sales and marketing for the franchise, and the family moved to Southlake, Texas. A former football player at the University of Hawaii, Greg Sr. helped coach his son's Pee Wee football team.

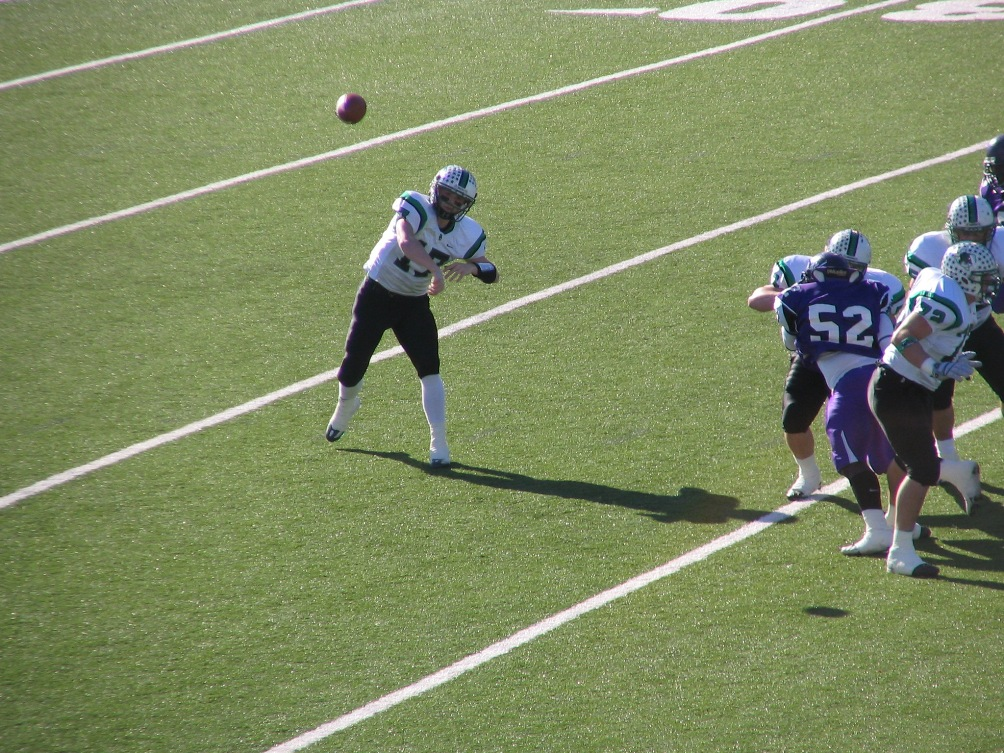
McElroy passes the ball for Carroll Senior High in 2005, during his senior season.

McElroy attended Carroll Senior High School in Southlake, Texas, playing football under head coach Todd Dodge. During his sophomore and junior seasons, McElroy played behind Chase Daniel, who later was in contention for the Heisman Trophy while playing for the Missouri Tigers. In his first season as a starter in 2005, McElroy passed for 4,636 yards, 56 touchdowns, and nine interceptions en route to a 16–0 season, which included the Texas 5A state championship For his efforts as a senior, McElroy was named the Texas 5A Player of the Year and an EA Sports All-American.

McElroy's 56 touchdown passes ranks first all-time in the Texas 5A classification, and second all-time in Texas high school football history, behind only Graham Harrell's 67 touchdowns in 2003. His 4,646 yards passing currently ranks fifth all-time in Texas.

== College career ==
McElroy had full-scholarship offers from several Division I football schools, eventually committing to Texas Tech. However, he later changed his commitment, accepting an offer from the Alabama Crimson Tide. In his first season, McElroy was redshirted by head coach Mike Shula. McElroy is a member of Sigma Alpha Epsilon.

On December 7, 2010, McElroy was inducted into the College Football Hall of Fame as a National Football Foundation scholar/athlete.

=== Freshman season ===
After his redshirt freshman year, McElroy saw limited playing time behind second-year starting quarterback John Parker Wilson. He played part of a game versus Western Carolina, throwing his first collegiate touchdown pass in the third quarter to tight end Nick Walker. He again saw late playing time against rival Tennessee, in a 41–17 rout.

=== Sophomore season ===
In the 2008 season, McElroy again saw limited action. He made six appearances late in games during the regular season. McElroy threw his first pass of the season in a 41–7 win over Western Kentucky, completing 4-of-6 passes for 61 yards. In the following game versus Arkansas, McElroy threw his first career interception early in the fourth quarter, which Razorback freshman cornerback Ramon Broadway returned to the Alabama 34-yard line. His first touchdown pass of the season came in a 36–0 rout of in-state rival Auburn in the annual Iron Bowl. His 34-yard strike to redshirt freshman Marquis Maze was the final score of the game.

=== Junior season ===
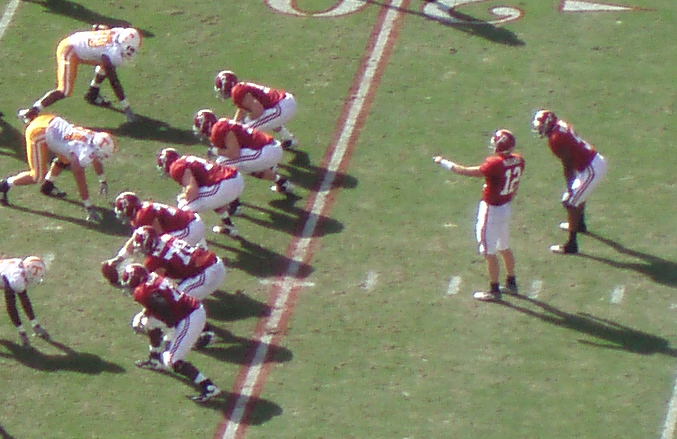
McElroy in the shotgun formation versus Tennessee

In Alabama's 2009 A-Day game, McElroy played impressively and was expected to be the starting quarterback for the 2009 season. It was confirmed that he would start on opening day when the depth chart was released on August 31. His first start came in the Chick-fil-A Kickoff Game, when the #5 Crimson Tide faced #7 Virginia Tech Hokies. With a slow start, in which McElroy completed just two of his first ten passes including an interception, the Tide were down 16–17 at halftime. However, he led the Crimson Tide to 18 points in the final quarter, including a 22-yard touchdown pass to running back Mark Ingram II, as Alabama downed the Hokies 34–24. For their performances, both he and Ingram shared the SEC Offensive Player of the Week award. The following week, McElroy completed 14 consecutive passes—a school record—en route to a 40–14 win over Florida International. He followed up the performance as he set another school record for passing efficiency in a single game, as he completed 13-of-15 passes (86.7%) in a 53–7 rout of North Texas.

McElroy was given his first conference start in a SEC matchup against Arkansas on September 26. His first touchdown came in the second quarter out of the wildcat formation when he connected with Julio Jones on a 50-yard pass. He finished the game with a career-high 291 passing yards and three touchdowns, while completing 17 of 24 passes in a 35–7 rout of the Razorbacks.

The following week, he made his first start on the road against the Kentucky Wildcats at Commonwealth Stadium. With another slow start, Alabama eventually pulled away as McElroy completed a 3-yard pass for a touchdown to Colin Peek in the final minute of the first half. He finished the game with 148 yards and two touchdowns, as Alabama rolled to a 5–0 start with a 38–20 victory in Lexington.

Alabama faced off against Ole Miss at Vaught–Hemingway Stadium in front of 62,657 fans, a record for the state of Mississippi. Another slow start kept the game close for Alabama, as the Crimson Tide led 3–0 midway through the first quarter. Alabama's only offensive touchdown finally came with under a minute in the second quarter, when running back Mark Ingram II rushed for a 36-yard touchdown, en route to 22–3 victory.

McElroy's worst performance of the season occurred on October 17, when Alabama hosted #22 South Carolina. He completed just half of his passes, including two interceptions. However, running back Mark Ingram II helped Alabama to a 20–6 victory with his 246 rushing yards. In the Third Saturday in October versus Tennessee, the Volunteers defense shut down Alabama's offense, keeping them from scoring a touchdown. McElroy completed 18-of-29 for 120 yards as Alabama held on for a 12–10 victory with four Leigh Tiffin field goals. On November 7, he helped Alabama clinch their second straight SEC West title as the team faced #9 LSU. After failing to throw a touchdown in four consecutive games, McElroy threw a 21-yard touchdown pass to Darius Hanks in the third quarter. After trailing in the fourth quarter, he threw his second touchdown of the game, connecting with Julio Jones on a 73-yard pass. McElroy finished 19-for-34 for 276 yards, including two touchdowns and one interception in a 24–15 victory.

As Alabama faced in-state rival Auburn on November 26, McElroy and the offense were in a 14–0 hole after the first quarter. With 5:31 left before halftime and trailing 14–7, he connected with tight end Colin Peek on a 33-yard pass to equalize before halftime. Entering the final 15 minutes, the Tide trailed Auburn, 21–20. He threw a 4-yard touchdown pass to running back Roy Upchurch with 1:24 remaining, with Alabama holding on for a 26–21 victory.

McElroy and Alabama squared off against the #1 Florida Gators in the 2009 SEC Championship Game, a rematch of the previous year's conference championship. Alabama got off to an early 9–0 lead in the first quarter, and still had the lead heading into halftime at 19–13. In the third quarter, he threw his lone touchdown of the game on a 17-yard high pass to Colin Peek to extend the lead to 26–13. Despite being a five-point underdog heading into the game, McElroy and Alabama rolled over the Gators 32–13 and secured a spot in the 2010 BCS National Championship Game. McElroy finished 12-for-18 for 239 yards and a touchdown which earned him the game's MVP honors.

McElroy led the Crimson Tide to the 2010 BCS National Championship Game versus the undefeated Big 12 Conference champions Texas Longhorns at the Rose Bowl. He was able to complete 6 of 11 pass attempts for 58 yards while being sacked five times and losing 27 yards. Ingram and freshman Trent Richardson carried Alabama to a 37–21 victory with 225 yards and four touchdowns rushing combined. After the Tide's victory, McElroy revealed that he had suffered two cracked ribs during the 2009 SEC Championship game, explaining the Tide's shift from a passing to pure rushing game.

=== Senior season ===
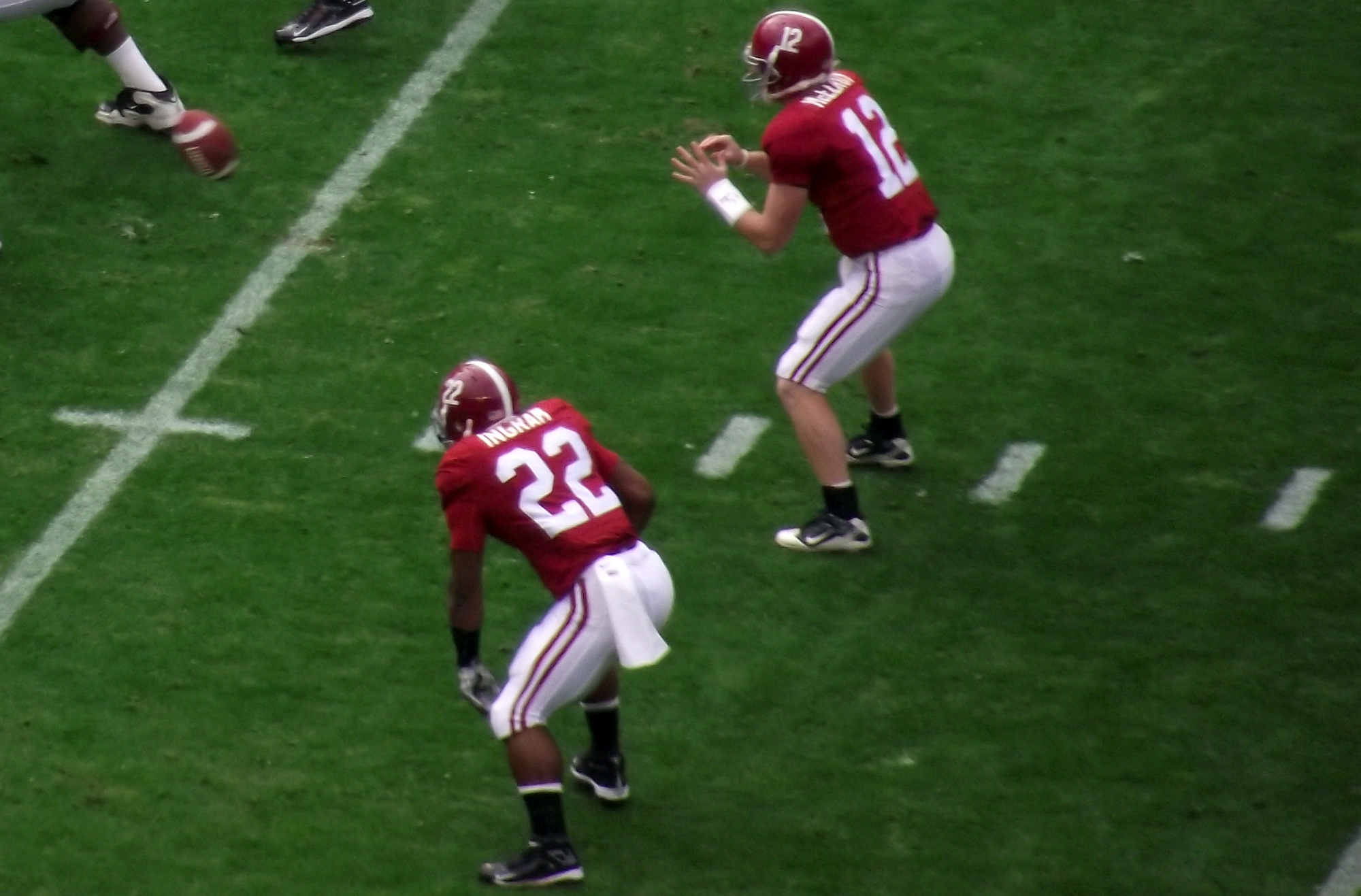
McElroy takes the snap out of the shotgun in the Iron Bowl in 2010.

McElroy led the Alabama Crimson Tide to a 10–3 record including a 49–7 win over Michigan State in the 2011 Capital One Bowl. His senior season began with a 5–0 start that was capped off by a 31–6 defeat of the Florida Gators on October 2. Alabama had defeated Duke, 62–13, on September 18.

After Alabama lost on the road to South Carolina, 35–21, on October 9, McElroy rallied the Crimson Tide to a 9–2 mark and a No. 9 ranking nationally heading into their grudge match with in-state rival Auburn in the annual Iron Bowl event. Along the way, he put up more numbers against SEC opposition that included Ole Miss (17-of-25, 219 yards passing, 2 TDs), Tennessee (21-of-32, 264 yards passing), and Mississippi State (12-of-18, 227 yards passing, 2 TDs) in blowout wins for Alabama. The regular season ended on a sour note on November 26 as McElroy led Alabama to a 24–7 halftime lead only to give out and narrowly fall behind in the 2nd half. Heisman Trophy winner Cam Newton rallied the Auburn Tigers to a 28–27 victory. McElroy suffered a concussion on Alabama's next to last possession and had to leave the game. He was replaced by backup AJ McCarron who threw four straight incompletions to end the game. McElroy went 27 for 37 for 377 yards and two touchdowns, giving him a career performance in the loss. In McElroy's final college game in the 49–7 win over Michigan State, he went 13 of 17 for 220 yards and a touchdown. He finished the season with a school record 2,987 passing yards.

=== Academics ===
McElroy graduated from Alabama in three years with a degree in business marketing. As an undergraduate he had a 3.85 GPA, and applied for, but did not win, a Rhodes Scholarship in 2010. In December 2010 he obtained a Master of Science degree in sports management, completing it with a 4.0 GPA.

In September 2010, McElroy was named the 20th-smartest athlete in sports by Sporting News. During the NFL Combine in February 2011, McElroy scored a 43 out of 50 on the Wonderlic Test of intelligence. His score was originally reported as a 48, which would have tied the all-time high for a quarterback set by Ryan Fitzpatrick.

On April 3, 2026, while discussing the Artemis II mission with Cole Cubelic on his morning radio show, McElroy asserted the Apollo moon landings, particularly Apollo 11, were faked.

== Professional career ==
=== Pre-draft ===
Pre-draft measurables
Height	Weight	Arm length	Hand span	Wingspan	40-yard dash	10-yard split	20-yard split	20-yard shuttle	Three-cone drill	Vertical jump	Broad jump	Wonderlic
6 ft 1 7/8 in (1.88 m)	220 lb (100 kg)	30 3/4 in (0.78 m)	9 3/8 in (0.24 m)	6 ft 1 5/8 in (1.87 m)	4.91 s	1.75 s	2.72 s	4.45 s	7.11 s	33.0 in (0.84 m)	8 ft 11 in (2.72 m)	43
All values from NFL Combine

McElroy was a late round draft projection despite his successes with Alabama. He was praised for his work ethic and accuracy, his ability to maneuver in the pocket and to recognize defensive formations and adjust to those formations. However, scouts had serious concerns about his arm strength which limited his value.

=== New York Jets ===
McElroy was selected by the New York Jets in the 7th round with the 208th pick in the 2011 NFL draft. He was expected to compete with fellow back-ups Mark Brunell, Kellen Clemens, and Kevin O'Connell. He came to an agreement with the Jets on a four-year contract on July 29, 2011.

McElroy made his preseason debut against the Houston Texans on August 15, 2011. Starter Mark Sanchez played one quarter before he was replaced by McElroy who played the rest of the game after second string back-up Mark Brunell was declared out with a finger injury. He completed 23 of his 39 pass attempts for 208 yards and a touchdown. He nearly led the Jets to victory; however, rookie wide receiver Michael Campbell dropped the game-winning pass in the end zone. In his second preseason game against the Cincinnati Bengals, He completed 6-of-9 pass attempts for 59 yards and a touchdown in the Jets' 27–7 win over the Bengals.

McElroy entered the Jets' preseason contest against the New York Giants with a little under seven minutes remaining in the third quarter. With the Jets leading 7–3, McElroy twice led the Jets on scoring drives. He completed 4 of his 5 pass attempts for 39 yards en route to a 17–3 victory. In the Jets' final preseason game against the Philadelphia Eagles, McElroy left midway through the second quarter with a thumb injury having completed 3 of his 6 pass attempts for 29 yards. McElroy dislocated the thumb and the team subsequently placed him on the injured reserve list, ending his season. McElroy returned in 2012 to play in the Jets' first preseason game against the Bengals. He completed 4 of his 6 pass attempts for 49 yards in the Jets' loss. He did not play the subsequent two games. He played in their preseason finale against the Philadelphia Eagles. He scored the team's lone touchdown of the preseason on a six-yard pass to Terrance Ganaway.

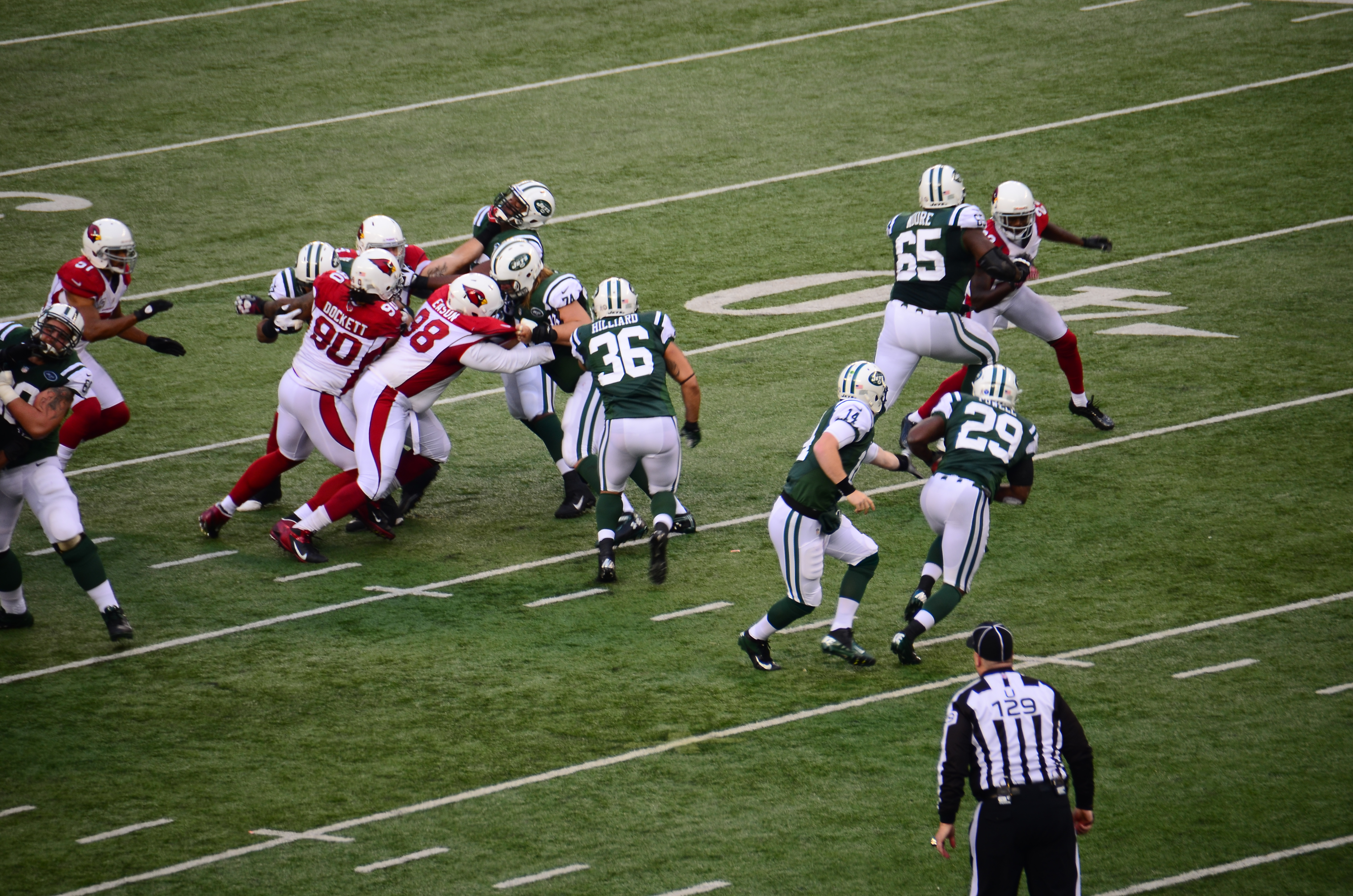
In his regular season debut on December 2, 2012, McElroy hands the ball off to running back Bilal Powell.

McElroy made his NFL debut on December 2, 2012, in the third quarter during the Jets' contest against the Arizona Cardinals, replacing incumbent Mark Sanchez who, prior to being benched by head coach Rex Ryan, had thrown three interceptions. Tim Tebow was inactive with a rib injury, leaving McElroy as the back-up to Sanchez. McElroy threw his first and only career touchdown pass to Jeff Cumberland on the first play of the fourth quarter en route to a 7–6 victory. McElroy finished the game completing 5-of-7 passes for 29 yards and a touchdown while rushing for 5 yards on 4 attempts. He was named the starting quarterback on December 18, 2012, one day after the Jets' loss to the Tennessee Titans on December 17.

In his only career start against the San Diego Chargers, McElroy completed 14-of-24 passes for 185 yards with an interception and lost a fumble. He was sacked 11 times, as the Jets lost 27–17. McElroy, who was expected to start the Jets' final game against the Buffalo Bills, was ruled out after revealing he had suffered concussion symptoms in the days preceding. McElroy stated that he informed his teammates of the symptoms he was suffering, although he hid it from staff until December 27.

On August 9, 2013, McElroy went 11-for-19 for 135 yards and a touchdown in a preseason game against the Detroit Lions. However, he suffered an ankle injury and would miss the rest of the preseason. He was released with an injury designation by the Jets on August 31, 2013.

=== Cincinnati Bengals ===
On September 1, 2013, McElroy was signed to the practice squad of the Cincinnati Bengals and spent the entire season on the practice squad. He announced his retirement from the National Football League on March 21, 2014.

== Career statistics ==
=== NFL ===
Year	Team	Games			Passing								Rushing				Sacked		Fumbles	
Year	Team	GP	GS	Record	Cmp	Att	Pct	Yds	Y/A	TD	Int	Rtg	Att	Yds	Avg	TD	Sck	SckY	Fum	Lost
2011	NYJ	0	0	—	Did not play due to injury															
2012	NYJ	2	1	0–1	19	31	61.3	214	6.9	1	1	79.2	8	30	3.8	0	11	71	1	1
Career		2	1	0–1	19	31	61.3	214	6.9	1	1	79.2	8	30	3.8	0	11	71	1	1

=== College ===
Year	Team	Games			Passing								Rushing				
Year	Team	GP	GS	Record	Cmp	Att	Pct	Yds	Lng	TD	Int	Rtg	Att	Yds	Avg	Lng	TD
2007	Alabama	2	0	—	8	9	88.9	73	32	1	0	193.7	0	0	0.0	0	0
2008	Alabama	6	0	—	8	11	72.7	123	34	1	1	178.5	0	0	0.0	0	0
2009	Alabama	14	14	14–0	197	325	60.6	2,508	80	17	4	140.2	54	83	1.5	16	1
2010	Alabama	13	13	10–3	222	313	70.9	2,987	85	20	5	169.0	59	−16	−0.3	17	1
Career		34	27	24–3	436	658	65.8	5,691	85	39	10	160.9	113	67	0.5	17	2

== Broadcasting career ==
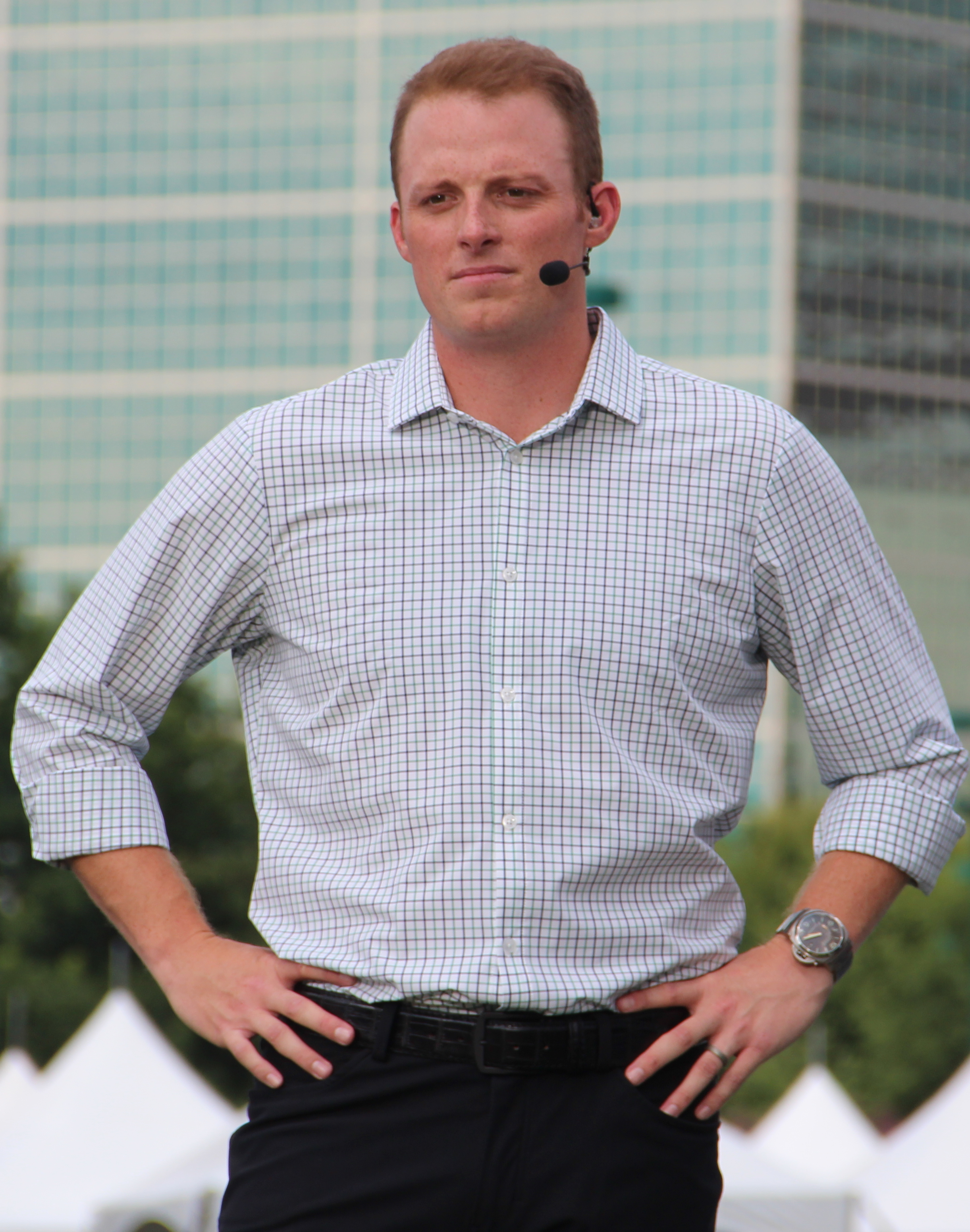
McElroy in 2018.

Three days after announcing his retirement from the NFL, McElroy announced he would become a college football analyst for ESPN's SEC Network starting in August 2014. McElroy began calling games from all conferences on ESPN in 2016. Beginning with the 2017 College Football season, McElroy began hosting Thinking Out Loud on the SEC Network with former LSU defensive end Marcus Spears.

In 2021, McElroy and Cole Cubelic were named co-hosts of the morning show on WJOX, a sports talk radio station in Birmingham, Alabama.
