= Scott Solomon =

American football player (born 1988)

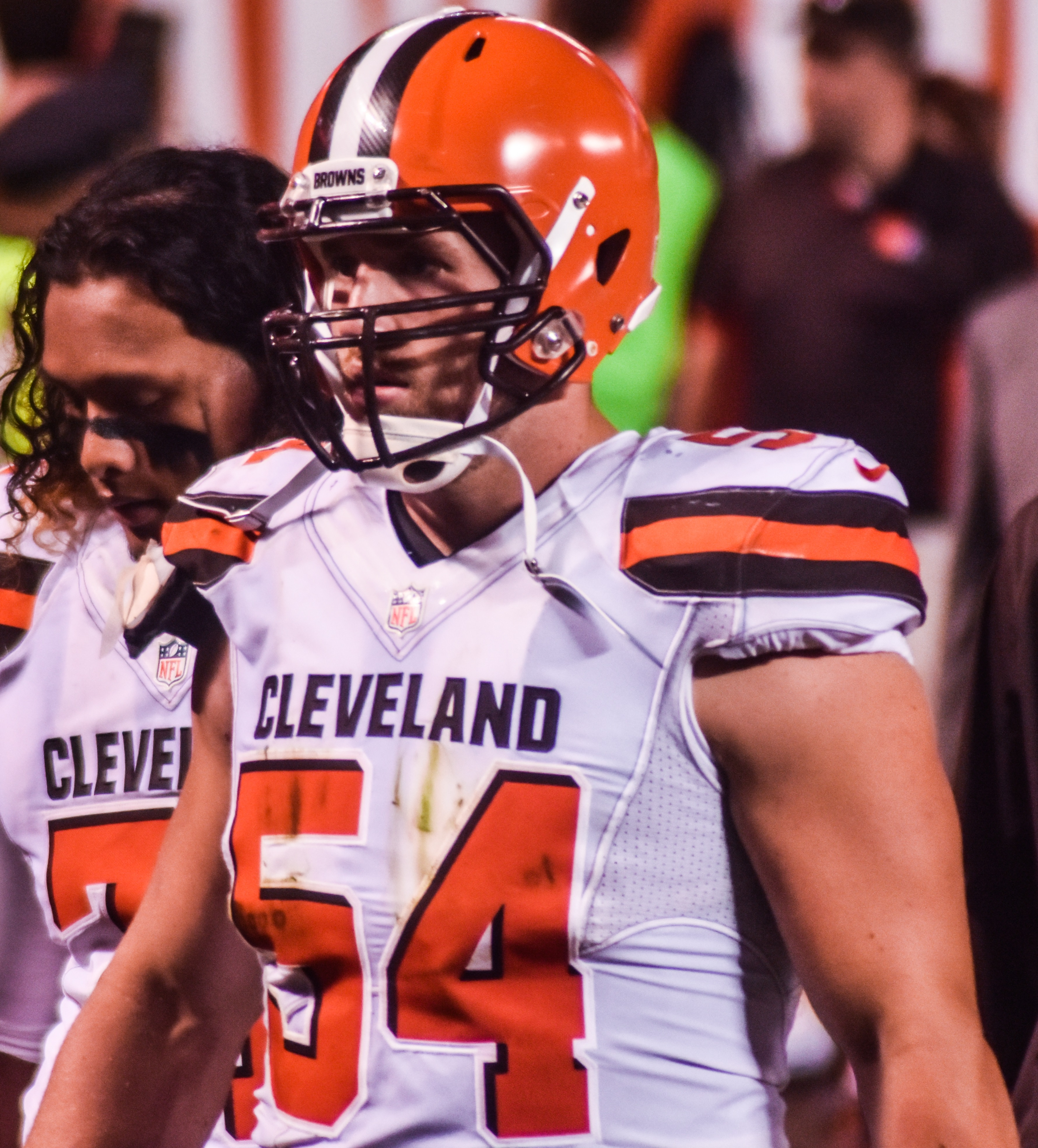
- Solomon with the Cleveland Browns in 2015

No. 90, 99, 56, 54
- Position: Defensive end/Linebacker

Personal information
- Born: November 5, 1988 (age 38); San Antonio, Texas, U.S.
- Listed height: 6 ft 3 in (1.91 m)
- Listed weight: 262 lb (119 kg)

Career information
- High school: Marshall (San Antonio)
- College: Rice
- NFL draft: 2012: 7th round, 211th overall pick

Career history
- Tennessee Titans (2012); New York Jets (2013); Tampa Bay Buccaneers (2013–2014); Cleveland Browns (2014–2015)

Awards and highlights
- 2× Second-team All-C-USA (2009, 2011)

Career NFL statistics
- Total tackles: 21
- Sacks: 2
- Forced fumbles: 2
- Fumble recoveries: 1
- Stats at Pro Football Reference

Scott Edward Solomon (born November 5, 1988) is an American former professional football player who played defensive end and linebacker in the National Football League (NFL). He played college football for the Rice Owls and was selected by the Tennessee Titans in the seventh round of the 2012 NFL draft. He also played for the New York Jets, Tampa Bay Buccaneers and Cleveland Browns.

== Early life ==
Solomon attended John Marshall High School in San Antonio, Texas. As a senior, he was named the District 28-5A Defensive Most Valuable Player, San Antonio Express-News All-Area team selection, and a second-team all-state selection after recording 105 tackles, including 13 tackles for loss and nine sacks that year. He also competed in the long jump, earned second-team academic all-state honors and graduated in the top ten percent of his class. Solomon participated in the Nike High School Combine in April 2006, scoring eighth place out of 400 football recruit participants.

== College career ==
Solomon was a four-year starter for Rice, where he majored in political science and was at Sid Richardson College. As a freshman in 2007, he recorded 49 tackles, 11 tackles for loss and 4.5 sacks and was named to the Conference USA All-Freshman team and a Freshman All-American by Scout.com. In 2008, he led Rice with nine tackles for loss and 4.5 sacks. In 2009, Solomon was selected as a team captain and earned second-team All-Conference USA honors from the conference's coaches. He led Conference USA defensive linemen with 63 tackles and recorded 6.5 sacks. He missed the 2010 season after suffering a broken bone in his right foot during fall training camp and received a medical redshirt.

Solomon returned in 2011 and was again selected as a team captain. Before the 2011 season, he changed his jersey number to 35 to honor teammate Travis Bradshaw, whose playing career had ended because of a neck injury. He recorded career highs of 8.5 sacks and 13.5 tackles for loss and earned second-team All-Conference USA honors from the league's coaches. He finished his Rice career tied for the school record with 24 sacks and with 43.5 tackles for loss. He was also named to the 2011 C-USA Football All-Academic team and was one of 19 players on the final watch list for the Ted Hendricks Award.

After his senior season, he moved to Florida to train with Athletes' Performance Institute and prepare for the NFL draft. He was also mentored by former NFL defensive end N. D. Kalu, who also attended John Marshall High School and Rice. By 2012, the San Antonio Express-News reported training marks of a 421-pound power clean, 500-pound bench press and 600-pound squat. At the 2012 NFL Scouting Combine, Solomon recorded 34 repetitions in the 225-pound bench press, a 35-inch vertical jump, a 124-inch broad jump, a 4.25-second short shuttle and a 4.88-second 40-yard dash. During the pre-draft process, the Titans separately reported that Solomon had completed 40 repetitions at 225 pounds.

== Professional career ==
=== Tennessee Titans ===
Solomon was selected in the seventh round, 211th overall, by the Tennessee Titans in the 2012 NFL draft. He made four tackles in his rookie season. He was released by the Titans on August 31, 2013.

=== New York Jets ===
Solomon was claimed off waivers by the New York Jets on September 1, 2013. He was released on September 10, 2013. He was re-signed six days later. He was released on October 4, 2013 after the Jets claimed tight end Zach Sudfeld off waivers.

=== Tampa Bay Buccaneers ===
Solomon signed with the Tampa Bay Buccaneers on December 26, 2013. He was released by the Buccaneers on September 9, 2014 and re-signed by the team on September 12, 2014. He was released by the Buccaneers on October 21, 2014.

=== Cleveland Browns ===
Solomon was signed to the Cleveland Browns' practice squad on November 18, 2014. He was promoted to the active roster on December 20, 2014.

On October 14, 2015, Solomon was placed on injured reserve after he injured his knee in a Week 2 game against the Baltimore Ravens.

On April 4, Solomon signed with the Cleveland Browns as a restricted free agent.

On May 2, 2016, Solomon was released.

== Career statistics ==
Year	Team	Games		Tackles					Interceptions						Fumbles		
Year	Team	GP	GS	Cmb	Solo	Ast	Sck	TFL	PD	Int	Yds	Avg	Lng	TD	FF	FR	TD
2012	TEN	13	0	4	3	1	0	0	0	0	0	0.0	0	0	0	0	0
2013	NYJ	1	0	0	0	0	0	0	0	0	0	0.0	0	0	0	0	0
2014	TAM	6	0	9	7	2	1.0	1	0	0	0	0.0	0	0	1	1	0
2014	CLE	2	0	7	2	5	1.0	1	0	0	0	0.0	0	0	1	0	0
2015	CLE	2	0	1	0	1	0	0	0	0	0	0.0	0	0	0	0	0
Career		24	0	21	12	9	2	2	0	0	0	0.0	0	0	2	1	0
