= John Idzik Jr. =

American football player (born 1961)

Personal information
- Born: 1961 (age 64–65); Detroit, Michigan, U.S.

Career information
- College: Dartmouth & Duke

Career history

Coaching
- Buffalo (1982) Receivers coach; Aberdeen Oilers (1990) Offensive backfield coach; Duke University (1991–1992) Graduate assistant; Tampa Bay Buccaneers (1993–1996) Pro personnel assistant

Operations
- Tampa Bay Buccaneers (1996–2001) Director of football administration; Tampa Bay Buccaneers (2001–2004) Assistant general manager; Arizona Cardinals (2004−2007) Senior director of football operations; Seattle Seahawks (2007−2012) Vice president of football administration; New York Jets (2013−2014) General manager; Jacksonville Jaguars (2015−2020) Special assistant to general manager

Awards and highlights
- Super Bowl champion (XXXVII)
- Executive profile at Pro Football Reference

John Idzik Jr. (born 1961) is a former consultant for the Jacksonville Jaguars of the National Football League (NFL). He is the former general manager of the New York Jets, having been named to the position on January 18, 2013 after spending the previous six seasons in the Seattle Seahawks front office as the vice president of football administration. His father, John Idzik, was also a coach in the NFL (notably he was an assistant coach with the Jets under Walt Michaels) and the CFL.

== Career ==
=== Early career ===
Idzik began his career as a coach in 1982 when he was named the wide receivers coach at the State University of New York at Buffalo. In 1990, he moved on to become the offensive backfield coach for the Aberdeen Oilers (Scotland) of the British American Football League. He would become a graduate assistant coach at Duke University, where he assisted with the offensive line and running backs for the 1991-92 seasons.

=== Tampa Bay Buccaneers ===
In 1993, he entered the NFL with the Tampa Bay Buccaneers organization and would go on to spend 11 years with the franchise, first as a pro personnel assistant, being elevated to director of football administration in 1996, and became the assistant general manager in 2001. During his tenure, the Buccaneers would win their first Super Bowl championship in 2002.

=== Arizona Cardinals ===
After his tenure with the Buccaneers, he spent three seasons working as the senior director of football operations for the Arizona Cardinals organization.

=== Seattle Seahawks ===
Idzik joined the Seattle Seahawks organization on February 16, 2007. With Seattle, Idzik was in charge of overseeing player negotiations, the team's compliance with the NFL salary cap, player personnel transactions, all football operations budgets, staff and team contracts, and most aspects of the day-to-day football operations while also remaining active in player evaluations. During this time, he also served as the club's primary liaison to the NFL Office and represented the club at league meetings.

=== New York Jets ===
On January 24, 2013, the Jets named John Idzik the team's general manager.

In his first season in 2013 as general manager, Idzik released linebacker Bart Scott, defensive back Eric Smith, offensive lineman Jason Smith, and defensive tackle Sione Pouha. In free agency, he added quarterback David Garrard, running back Mike Goodson, offensive lineman Willie Colon, linebacker Antwan Barnes, and safety Dawan Landry. Prior to the 2013 NFL draft, Idzik traded star cornerback Darrelle Revis to the Tampa Bay Buccaneers in exchange for their first round selection (13th overall) in the 2013 NFL Draft and a conditional pick in the 2014 NFL Draft. He also agreed to a trade with the New Orleans Saints to obtain running back Chris Ivory for a fourth round selection (106th overall). His first draft class saw him select cornerback Dee Milliner with the 9th overall selection, Sheldon Richardson with the 13th overall selection, and Geno Smith with the 39th overall selection. Upon the drafting of Smith, Idzik also chose to release quarterback Tim Tebow on April 29, 2013.

With the Jets making the change in quarterback to rookie Geno Smith, the team went 8–8 and finished second in the AFC East in Idzik's first season as general manager.

During the 2014 offseason, Idzik released a number of players, including cornerback Antonio Cromartie, wide receiver Santonio Holmes, and quarterback Mark Sanchez. To replace Sanchez, Idzik added veteran quarterback Michael Vick, who previously worked in offensive coordinator Marty Mornhinweg's system with the Philadelphia Eagles. In addition to Vick, Idzik also signed former Seattle Seahawks offensive lineman Breno Giacomini and former Denver Broncos wide receiver Eric Decker. In April, Idzik saw an opportunity to bolster the offensive side of the ball by adding veteran running back Chris Johnson, formerly of the Tennessee Titans. The 2014 NFL draft saw the Jets have 12 draft selections, including 18th overall selection safety Calvin Pryor and 49th overall selection tight end Jace Amaro. Idzik addressed the wide receiver position with a trio of wide receivers, including Jalen Saunders and Shaquelle Evans in the 4th round and Quincy Enunwa in the 6th round. Saunders and Enunwa were subsequently cut from the team after the start of the season although Enunwa later returned to the active roster on December 27, 2014.

During the 2014 season, Idzik received a large amount of criticism for the lack of talent he provided on the roster. As a result, a group of fans raised money to purchase billboards in New Jersey reading "Fire John Idzik" and passed out rally towels with the same message at select home games. A second group of fans flew a plane over the Jets practice facility with the same message.

Idzik was fired on December 29, 2014 after two seasons with the team.

=== Jacksonville Jaguars ===
Idzik was hired as a salary cap consultant by the Jacksonville Jaguars on February 25, 2015 but was not retained as of January 18, 2021.

=== Scouting ===
Idzik currently serves as President of Football Operation for SūmerSports and is a featured expert in SūmerSports’ NFL draft evaluation show, THE EVALUATION.
