= Chris Pantale =

American football player (born 1990)

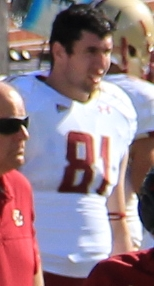
- Pantale with Boston College in 2012

No. 83
- Positions: Tight end, fullback

Personal information
- Born: March 22, 1990 (age 36); Wayne, New Jersey, U.S.
- Listed height: 6 ft 6 in (1.98 m)
- Listed weight: 255 lb (116 kg)

Career information
- High school: Wayne
- College: Boston College
- NFL draft: 2013: undrafted

Career history
- New York Jets (2013–2014); Chicago Bears (2015)*; Philadelphia Eagles (2015–2016)*; Miami Dolphins (2017)*
- * Offseason or practice squad member only

Career NFL statistics
- Games played: 5
- Stats at Pro Football Reference

Christopher Joseph Pantale (born March 22, 1990) is an American former professional football player who was a tight end in the National Football League (NFL). He was signed by the New York Jets as an undrafted free agent in 2013. He played college football for the Boston College Eagles.

== Early life ==
Pantale attended Wayne Valley High School in Wayne, New Jersey. He was selected to the Associated Press All-State third-team as a senior tight end at Wayne Valley High School. He gained 2007 Super 100 All-State honors from the New Jersey Football Coaches Association. He was selected to the 2007 All-Passaic County first-team and was selected to the All-North Jersey second-team. He was selected to the All-Northern Hills Conference team and all-area honors from the Herald News. He played in the 2008 New York/New Jersey All-Star Classic. He also participated in the high school basketball and track teams earning all-state track honors. He was selected as the National Football Foundation and Hall of Fame Scholar-Athlete by the organization's Passaic County chapter.

== College career ==
Pantale played football at Boston College.

Pantale was redshirt freshman and did not play the entire 2008 season.

In his Redshirt freshman season in 2009, Pantale played in all 13 games with 11 starts. He recorded 25 receptions, 223 receiving yards and one receiving touchdown. He was selected to the Sporting News and Rivals All-ACC freshman teams. He also was selected to the second-team All-American freshman by the College Football Network.

In his sophomore season in 2010, Pantale recorded 31 receptions, 338 receiving yards along with one touchdown.

In his junior season in 2011, Pantale had 21 receptions, 236 receiving yards and 3 receiving touchdowns.

In his senior season in 2012, Pantale had 21 Receptions, 189 receiving yards along with 2 receiving touchdowns.

On January 19, 2013, Pantale was selected to play in the 2013 East-West Shrine Game.

== Professional career ==
=== New York Jets ===
On April 27, 2013, Pantale signed with the New York Jets as an undrafted free agent following the conclusion of the 2013 NFL draft. He was released on August 31, 2013. He was signed to the team's practice squad a day later. Pantale was promoted to the active roster on November 27, 2013. Pantale was released on August 30, 2014 and signed to the team's practice squad a day later. Pantale was promoted to the active roster on December 1, 2014. Pantale was released on May 8, 2015.

=== Chicago Bears ===
Pantale was signed by the Chicago Bears on May 12, 2015. He was released August 30, 2015 with a non football illness.

=== Philadelphia Eagles ===
Pantale signed with the Philadelphia Eagles practice squad on September 21, 2015. On September 3, 2016, he was released by the Eagles.

=== Miami Dolphins ===
On January 10, 2017, Pantale signed a reserve/future contract with the Miami Dolphins. He was waived on September 2, 2017.
