= J. B. Shugarts =

American football player (born 1989)

Current position
- Title: Graduate assistant
- Team: Toledo
- Conference: MAC

Biographical details
- Born: October 26, 1989 (age 37); Klein, Texas
- Education: Ohio State University

Playing career
- 2008-2011: Ohio State
- 2012: Cleveland Browns
- 2012: Buffalo Bills
- 2013: Dallas Cowboys
- 2013: New York Jets
- 2014: Detroit Lions
- 2014: Tampa Bay Buccaneers
- Position: Offensive tackle

Coaching career (HC unless noted)
- 2016–present: Toledo (GA)

Jeffrey Bret "J. B." Shugarts (born October 26, 1989) is an American former football offensive tackle. He signed with the Detroit Lions as a free agent on April 3, 2014. He played college football at Ohio State.

J.B. played high school football at Klein, Texas where he was a Parade, U.S. Army and E.A. Sports All American. J.B. was runner up Texas High School Player of the year in 2007 and was rated the #1 OL in the state of Texas.

J.B. had over 30 major D1 offers before narrowing his Top 4 to Ohio State, L.S.U., Oklahoma and Texas A.M. J.B. committed to Ohio State in the spring of his Junior year. J.B. played and started in the U.S. Army All American game in January 2008 and early enrolled at Ohio State following the game.

J.B. played at Ohio State 2008 - 2011. J.B. played in 44 games starting 35. The Buckeyes won Big Ten Championships in 2008, 2009 and 2010. Winning the Rose Bowl in 2009 and the Sugar Bowl in 2010 and playing in the Fiesta Bowl in 2008.

== Early life ==
Jeffrey Bret "J. B." Shugarts was born on October 26, 1989, in Fort Worth, Texas, a son of Jeffrey Bret Shugarts and Donna Miller Shugarts Brittain. His parents divorced in 1992, when he was almost three years old. He attended Ohio State where he played college football.

== Professional career ==
=== Cleveland Browns ===
On May 9, 2012, he signed with the Cleveland Browns as an undrafted free agent.

=== Buffalo Bills ===
On December 5, 2012, signed to Buffalo Bills practice squad.

=== Dallas Cowboys ===
On May 29, 2013, he was signed with the Dallas Cowboys.

=== New York Jets ===
On July 23, 2013, he signed with the New York Jets. He was released on August 31, 2013. He was signed to the team's practice squad a day later. He was released on September 3, 2013.

=== Detroit Lions ===
On April 3, 2014, he signed with a 1-year contract with the Detroit Lions. He was released on July 17, 2014.

=== Tampa Bay Buccaneers ===
On July 22, 2014, signed a 1-year contract with the Tampa Bay Buccaneers.

== College career ==
2008 - 2011 Ohio State University. J.B. early enrolled in 2008 and played in 44 games while starting 35 at Right Tackle on the Buckeye OL. J.B. was part of 3 Big Ten Championships while the Buckeyes won the Rose Bowl in 2010 over Oregon and the Sugar Bowl in 2011 over Arkansas. The Buckeyes also played in the Fiesta Bowl in 2009 during J.B.'s career.

== Coaching career ==
2014, Graduate Assistant University of Toledo. The Rockets finished at 9-2 and were West co-champions of the MAC. The OL began the season with no returning starters but quickly became a strength of the team yielding 4 sacks and ranking #2 in the nation.
