= K. J. Stroud =

American gridiron football player (born 1989)

K.J. Stroud
No. 15
- Position: Wide receiver

Personal information
- Born: December 20, 1989 (age 36); Brooklyn, New York, U.S.
- Listed height: 6 ft 3 in (1.91 m)
- Listed weight: 210 lb (95 kg)

Career information
- High school: Fort Hamilton (Brooklyn)
- College: Bethune-Cookman
- NFL draft: 2013: undrafted

Career history
- New York Jets (2013)*; Toronto Argonauts (2014)*; Spokane Shock (2015)*; New Orleans Voodoo (2015)
- * Offseason or practice squad member only
- Stats at ArenaFan.com

Keith "KJ" Stroud (born December 20, 1989) is an American former football wide receiver He was signed by the New York Jets as an undrafted free agent in 2013. He played college football at Rutgers before transferring to Bethune-Cookman for his final two seasons. KJ is currently the Wide Receivers Coach at Bishop Moore Catholic High School in Orlando, FL.

== Early life ==
He was selected to All-City and All-State teams while attending Fort Hamilton High School. He was named to the Brooklyn Big 44 team while at high school. He played his final season of high school football at Fork Union Military Academy in Virginia, where he finished ranked as a top players in Virginia before enrolling at Rutgers University.

== College career ==
He played college football at Rutgers for his Freshman and Sophomore season then transferred to Bethune-Cookman for his Junior and Senior seasons. While at Rutgers for his Freshman and Sophomore seasons, he had a total of 17 Receptions, 169 Receiving yards and no touchdowns.

== Professional career ==
=== New York Jets ===
On April 27, 2013, he signed with the New York Jets as an undrafted free agent following the 2013 NFL draft. He was released on August 26, 2013.

=== Toronto Argonauts ===
On February 24, 2014, Stroud signed with the Toronto Argonauts of the Canadian Football League. He was released by the Argonauts on June 22, 2014.

=== Spokane Shock ===
On November 17, 2014, Stroud was assigned to the Spokane Shock of the Arena Football League. He was placed on reassignment on April 1, 2015.

=== New Orleans VooDoo ===
On May 14, 2015, Stroud was assigned to the New Orleans VooDoo. After starting in a single game, Stroud was targeted 3 times, but did not catch a pass. Stroud was placed on reassignment on May 18, 2015.
