= Tevita Finau =

American football player (born 1986)

Personal information
- Born: January 13, 1986 (age 40); Hamilton, New Zealand
- Listed height: 6 ft 5 in (1.96 m)
- Listed weight: 288 lb (131 kg)

Career information
- High school: Kahuku (HI)
- College: University of Utah

Career history

Playing
- Arizona Cardinals (2012)*; Philadelphia Eagles (2012)*; Dallas Cowboys (2012)*; New York Jets (2012–2014)*; Houston Texans (2015)*
- * Offseason or practice squad member only

Coaching
- University of Utah (2021) Graduate assistant; University of Utah (2022) Defensive administrative assistant; Utah State University (2023) Defensive line coach; University of Utah (2024) Defense; Idaho (2025-present) Defensive line coach
- Stats at Pro Football Reference

Tevita Tolu Finau (Born January 13, 1986) is a New Zealand-born former professional American football defensive linemen and current football coach. He played college football at the University of Utah. He was signed by the Arizona Cardinals as an undrafted free agent in 2012.

He was also a member of the Philadelphia Eagles, Dallas Cowboys, New York Jets, and Houston Texans.

== Early life ==
Born in Hamilton, New Zealand, to Tolu Halaapiapi and Finau Takinima, he has lived in New Zealand, Tonga, and in Hawaii. Finau attended three high schools in Hawaii: Lahainaluna High School as a freshman and sophomore, Maui High School his junior year, and Kahuku High & Intermediate School as a senior. He was a three-time first-team all-state honoree in basketball from 2002 to 2004. He helped Kahuku win the Hawaii State Football Championship in 2004.

== College career ==
Finau played two seasons of junior college football for Phoenix College before originally committing to play football at West Virginia University. The highly-touted recruit never made it to Morgantown however, and Finau eventually ended up enrolling at the University of Utah, where he appeared in 21 games in his two-year career for the Utes and finished with 72 tackles, 6 1/2 sacks, and 13 TFL's. He graduated with a bachelor's degree in Sociology from the University of Utah.

== Professional career ==
=== Dallas Cowboys ===
Finau was signed to the Dallas Cowboys practice squad on November 14, 2012, after going undrafted and spending time in training camp with both the Arizona Cardinals and Philadelphia Eagles. Finau was released from the practice squad on November 27, 2012.

=== New York Jets ===
Finau was signed to the New York Jets practice squad on December 5, 2012. He signed a future/reserve contract on December 31, 2013. He was released on August 31, 2014. He was signed to the team's practice squad a day later.

=== Houston Texans ===
Finau was signed by the Houston Texans to a reserve futures contract on December 30, 2014. He was cut on September 6, 2015.

== Coaching career ==
=== Orem High School ===
Finau served as a football coach at Orem High School in Orem, Utah, for five seasons from 2015 to 2019, including four years as co-defensive coordinator.

=== University of Utah ===
Finau served as a graduate assistant in 2021 and a defensive administrative assistant in 2022. Those teams won back-to-back Pac-12 titles and made two consecutive Rose Bowl appearances against Ohio State and Penn State, respectively.

=== Utah State University ===
Finau was hired as the defensive line coach at Utah State in 2023. The Aggies had a 6–7 record and finished the year playing in the Idaho Potato Bowl against Georgia State.

=== Bill Walsh Diversity Coaching Fellowship ===
2022 Spent the off-season with the 2022 Super Bowl Champions. Los Angeles Rams.
