= Tim Fugger =

American football player (born 1989)

Profile
- Positions: Defensive end, outside linebacker

Personal information
- Born: July 1, 1989 (age 37); San Diego, California, U.S.
- Listed height: 6 ft 3 in (1.91 m)
- Listed weight: 248 lb (112 kg)

Career information
- High school: Montini Catholic (Lombard, Illinois)
- College: Vanderbilt (2007–2011)
- NFL draft: 2012: 7th round, 214th overall pick

Career history
- Indianapolis Colts (2012); Arizona Cardinals (2012)*; New York Jets (2013)*
- * Offseason or practice squad member only

Awards and highlights
- Second-team All-SEC (2011)
- Stats at Pro Football Reference

Timothy Scott Fugger (FEW-gur; born July 1, 1989) is an American former football player. A defensive end, he played college football for the Vanderbilt Commodores and was selected by the Indianapolis Colts in the seventh round of the 2012 NFL draft. He played defensive end in college and was an outside linebacker during his NFL career. Fugger was named second-team All-Southeastern Conference in 2011 after leading Vanderbilt in sacks, tackles-for-loss, and forced fumbles.

== Early life ==
Timothy Scott Fugger was born on July 1, 1989, in San Diego, California. He first enrolled at Bishop Kenny High School in Jacksonville, Florida. After his sophomore year, he transferred to Montini Catholic High School in Lombard, Illinois. As a senior football player in 2006, he was a two-way starter as both a tight end and defensive end. Fugger missed the final three games of the 2006 season, catching 14 catches for 267 yards and two touchdowns while earning All-Suburban Catholic Conference honors. He also posted 61 tackles and four sacks on defense. He participated in track and basketball at Montini as well.

== College career ==
Fugger received athletic scholarship offers from the University of Akron and Vanderbilt University, choosing to enroll at Vanderbilt to play college football for the Commodores. He joined Vanderbilt as a tight end but was moved to defensive end two weeks into freshman camp. He redshirted the 2007 season and was a four-year letterman from 2008 to 2011. Fugger missed the start of the 2008 season due to injury and then appeared in nine games as a backup defensive end, recording eight solo tackles, six assisted tackles, and one forced fumble. He played in all 12 games, starting eight in relief of the injured Steven Stone, in 2009, posting 11 solo tackles, 10 assisted tackles, one sack, and one interception.

Fugger appeared in all 12 games, starting 10, as a junior during the 2010 season, totaling 13 solo tackles, nine assisted tackles, three sacks, four forced fumbles, and one pass breakup. Through September 24, he was leading the Southeastern Conference (SEC) in forced fumbles with three but only had one the rest of the year. His four forced fumbles were the most on the team that season. Fugger started all 13 games his senior year in 2011, recording 33 combined tackles (21 solo, 12 assisted, 13.5 for loss), seven sacks, three forced fumbles, and four pass breakups. He led the team in sacks, tackles-for-loss, and forced fumbles (tied with Archibald Barnes) during the 2011 season, earning coaches second-team All-SEC and Associated Press honorable mention All-SEC honors. He also garnered Academic All-SEC recognition in 2011. Fugger was part of the first group of Vanderbilt players to play in two bowl games (the 2008 Music City Bowl and the 2011 Liberty Bowl). He ended his college career with eight forced fumbles, tied with Chris Marve for the most in school history. During his stay at Vanderbilt, Fugger was enrolled at Vanderbilt Peabody College to earn a degree in human and organizational development.

== Professional career ==
Fugger turned down invitations to several postseason all-star games to work with Vanderbilt strength and condition director Dwight Gait in preparation for the NFL draft. Fugger was not invited to the NFL Combine but "demonstrated an impressive combination of size and speed" at Vanderbilt's pro day, running a 4.60 second 40-yard dash at 6 feet 3 inches (1.91 m) and 248 pounds (112 kg). He was selected by the Indianapolis Colts in the seventh round, with the 214th overall pick, of the 2012 NFL draft as an outside linebacker. He signed with the team on May 16. Fugger was waived/injured on August 31 with a sports hernia and then reverted to injured reserve. On September 12, 2012, it was reported that he had been cut by the Colts.

On October 30, 2012, Fugger was signed to the practice squad of the Arizona Cardinals. He became a free agent after the 2012 season and signed a reserve/future contract with the Cardinals on January 11, 2013. He was waived with an injury settlement on July 24, 2013, after failing a physical.

After New York Jets practice squad linebacker Danny Lansanah was signed to the Tampa Bay Buccaneers' active roster, the Jets signed Fugger on December 4, 2013, to take Lansanah's spot on the practice squad. Fugger signed a reserve/future contract with the Jets on December 31. He was released on August 12, 2014, after hyperextending his knee.

== Personal life ==
Fugger later worked for InvoiceCloud, a company that offers "digital payment solutions".
