= Joseph Collins (American football) =

American gridiron football player (born 1988)

Joe Collins
Profile
- Position: Wide receiver

Personal information
- Born: January 11, 1988 (age 38); Seaside, California
- Listed height: 6 ft 3 in (1.91 m)
- Listed weight: 195 lb (88 kg)

Career information
- College: Weber State
- NFL draft: 2011: undrafted

Career history
- Hamilton Tiger-Cats (2012)*; New York Jets (2012–2013)*
- * Offseason or practice squad member only

Career NFL statistics
- Receptions: --
- Receiving Yards: --
- Receiving Touchdowns: --
- Stats at Pro Football Reference

Joseph D. Collins (born January 11, 1988) is an American former professional gridiron football wide receiver.

== College career ==
He attended Monterey Peninsula Junior College, where he had 10 receptions for 198 receiving yards and three touchdowns in a single game during his 2007 season. In his senior season, he was named 2010–11 Weber State Male Athlete of the Year and was the Crystal Crest recipient for Male Athlete of the Year. He was unanimously selected to the Big Sky All-Conference First-team following the conclusion of his senior season. He was selected to the Third-team All-American honors from The Sports Network and Phil Steele.

== Professional career ==
=== Hamilton Tiger-Cats ===
On May 24, 2012, he signed with the Hamilton Tiger-Cats of the Canadian Football League.

=== New York Jets ===
On August 7, 2012, he signed with the New York Jets. On August 31, he was released in the final roster cuts. On January 2, 2013, he re-signed with the team to a reserve/future contract. He was released on August 26, 2013.
