= Michael Campbell (gridiron football) =

American gridiron football player (born 1989)

No. 16, 86
- Position: Wide receiver

Personal information
- Born: August 12, 1989 (age 37); Edison, New Jersey, U.S.
- Listed height: 6 ft 2 in (1.88 m)
- Listed weight: 205 lb (93 kg)

Career information
- College: Temple
- NFL draft: 2011: undrafted

Career history
- New York Jets (2011–2012)*; St. Louis Rams (2012)*; New York Jets (2013); Ottawa Redblacks (2015); Saskatchewan Roughriders (2016)*
- * Offseason or practice squad member only
- Stats at Pro Football Reference
- Stats at CFL.ca (archive)

Michael Campbell (born August 12, 1989) is an American former professional football wide receiver. He was signed by the New York Jets of the National Football League (NFL) as an undrafted free agent in 2011. He played college football for the Temple Owls.

== Early life ==
Born and raised in Edison, New Jersey, Campbell attended Edison High School. He was named to the Newark Star Ledger first-team All-Middlesex and first-team All-Greater Middlesex Conference team. Campbell recorded 39 receptions for 745 receiving yards and along with 14 touchdowns in his senior season in high school. He was named MVP of the 2007 New York/New Jersey All-Star Classic and was selected to participate in the 2007 New Jersey North-South All-Star Game. Campbell was also selected as a member of the NJFCA Super 100 Team.

== College career ==
Campbell was selected to the 2010 All-MAC third-team by Phil Steele. He was named Temple's 2010 offensive MVP following his senior season and was an honorable mention National Performer of the Week in November 2010.

== Professional career ==
=== New York Jets (first stint) ===
On July 27, 2011, he signed with the New York Jets as an undrafted free agent. On September 2, 2011, he was released. On September 27, 2011, he was signed to the practice squad. On October 4, 2011, he was released from the practice squad. On October 12, 2011, he was signed to the practice squad again. On October 25, 2011, he was released from the practice squad. On November 1, 2011, he was signed to the practice squad after wide receiver Scotty McKnight was placed on practice-squad injured reserve due to a torn ACL. On January 2, 2012, he was signed to a reserve/future contract. On March 14, 2012, he was released.

=== St. Louis Rams ===
On May 14, 2012, he signed with the St. Louis Rams. On August 28, he was released.

=== New York Jets (second stint) ===
Campbell signed with the New York Jets on August 4, 2013. He was released on August 31 but was signed to the practice squad a day later. He was promoted to the active roster on October 5, 2013. He was released on November 1, 2013. He was re-signed to the practice squad on November 27, 2013. He was released on August 24, 2014.
