= Danny Lansanah =

American football player (born 1985)

No. 58, 51
- Position: Linebacker

Personal information
- Born: August 28, 1985 (age 41); Harrisburg, Pennsylvania, U.S.
- Listed height: 6 ft 1 in (1.85 m)
- Listed weight: 255 lb (116 kg)

Career information
- High school: Harrisburg
- College: Connecticut
- NFL draft: 2008: undrafted

Career history
- Green Bay Packers (2008); Miami Dolphins (2009)*; Detroit Lions (2009)*; Hartford Colonials (2010); Las Vegas Locomotives (2011–2012); New York Jets (2013); Tampa Bay Buccaneers (2013–2015); Miami Dolphins (2016)*
- * Offseason or practice squad member only

Awards and highlights
- First-team All-Big East (2007)

Career NFL statistics
- Total tackles: 139
- Sacks: 2.5
- Forced fumbles: 1
- Pass deflections: 12
- Interceptions: 3
- Defensive touchdowns: 2
- Stats at Pro Football Reference

Daniel Delray Lansanah (born August 28, 1985) is an American former professional football player who was a linebacker in the National Football League (NFL). He was signed by the Green Bay Packers as an undrafted free agent in 2008. He played college football for the Connecticut Huskies.

Lansanah was also a member of the Miami Dolphins, Detroit Lions, Hartford Colonials, Las Vegas Locomotives, New York Jets, and Tampa Bay Buccaneers.

== Professional career ==
=== New York Jets ===
Lansanah was signed to a reserve/future contract by the New York Jets on January 4, 2013. He was released on September 1, 2013. He was signed to the team's practice squad two days later. He was promoted to the active roster on September 7, 2013. He was released two days later.

Lansanah was signed to the team's practice squad on September 16, 2013.

=== Tampa Bay Buccaneers ===
==== 2013 season ====
Lansanah was signed off the Jets' practice squad by the Tampa Bay Buccaneers on December 4, 2013 after a season-ending injury to linebacker Jonathan Casillas. He primarily was a practice squad and reserve line backer without any playing time.

==== 2014 season ====
Lansanah got his 1st big break when he was promoted to starting Outside LB when injuries took LB Jonathan Casillas out action. Since becoming the starter Lansanah has thrived in Lovie Smith's Tampa 2 Defense finishing the 2014 season with 81 combined tackles (61 solo), 1.5 QB Sacks, and 3 interceptions with 2 of those interceptions returned for touchdowns. He was highly praised by Lovie and the defensive coaching staff for his versatility as an Inside and Outside Line Backer when he filled in for 2 games for an injured Lavonte David.

==== 2015 season ====
Lansanah was offered and accepted his restricted free agent tender on March 5, 2015 to return to the Buccaneers for the 2015 season. He will have an opportunity to compete for a starting role as an outside linebacker.

=== Miami Dolphins ===
On August 3, 2016, the Miami Dolphins signed Lansanah to compete for the job as the backup middle linebacker against Neville Hewitt and Zach Vigil. He was waived on August 10, 2016.
