= Jason Smith (American football) =

American football player (born 1986)

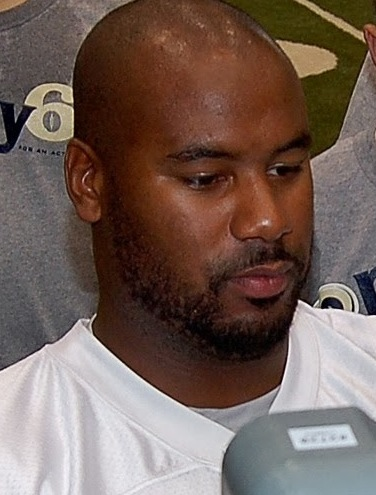
- Smith in 2010

Abilene Christian Wildcats
- Title: Running backs coach

Personal information
- Born: April 30, 1986 (age 40); Dallas, Texas, U.S.
- Listed height: 6 ft 5 in (1.96 m)
- Listed weight: 308 lb (140 kg)

Career information
- High school: W. T. White (Dallas, Texas)
- College: Baylor (2004–2008)
- NFL draft: 2009: 1st round, 2nd overall pick

Career history

Playing
- St. Louis Rams (2009–2011); New York Jets (2012); New Orleans Saints (2013)*; New York Jets (2013)*
- * Offseason or practice squad member only

Coaching
- North Texas (2023) Offensive analyst; Abilene Christian (2024) Tight ends coach; Abilene Christian (2025–present) Running backs coach

Operations
- North Texas (2022) Coaching intern

Awards and highlights
- First-team All-American (2008); First-team All-Big 12 (2008)

Career NFL statistics
- Games played: 45
- Games started: 26
- Stats at Pro Football Reference

Jason Kyle Smith (born April 30, 1986) is an American former professional football player who was an offensive tackle in the National Football League (NFL). He serves as the running backs coach at Abilene Christian, a position he has held since 2025. He was selected by the St. Louis Rams with the second overall pick in the 2009 NFL draft. He played college football for the Baylor Bears. As a professional, he was a member of the Rams, the New York Jets, and the New Orleans Saints.

== Early life ==
Smith attended W. T. White High School, in Dallas, Texas. He was a First-team All-District honors as a sophomore and junior as an offensive tackle. As a senior, he was moved to tight end, catching seven passes for 101 yards and one touchdown. He was rewarded with All-District honors as a senior.

At 6 ft 5 in (1.96 m) and 220 lb (100 kg), Smith did not have ideal size and was only considered a two-star prospect by Rivals.com. He drew few scholarship offers and committed to Baylor on the same day that he received his offer.

== College career ==
After redshirting his first season at Baylor, Smith played tight end in 2005, appearing in 11 games, starting eight. He caught 6 passes for 70 yards and one touchdown. As a sophomore in 2006, he was moved to the offensive line and started all 12 games of his sophomore season at right tackle. Despite missing several games due to a sprained knee, Smith earned an All-Big 12 honorable mention as he started seven games at left tackle as a junior.

Prior to his senior year, Smith graduated a year early from the school in May 2008, having graduated with a Bachelor of Science in Education degree in recreation. As a senior in 2008 he was an All-American selection and an All-Big 12 Conference selection as well. Smith was named Baylor's co-Most Valuable Player. He was credited by the school with 96 knockdown blocks, which were the most ever by a Baylor offensive lineman. Smith gave up 3 1/2 sacks and was penalized five times. With Baylor running a spread offense since the arrival of new head coach Art Briles, Smith was usually in a two-point stance for pass protection, which caused NFL scouts to question his run blocking ability.

=== College awards and honors ===
- 2008 First-team All-Big 12
- 2008 Associated Press and Rivals.com Third-team All-American
- 2008 Football Writers Association of America All-American
- 2008 Pro Football Weekly honorable mention All-American

== Professional career ==
=== Pre-draft ===
At the 2009 NFL Combine, Smith recorded the 11th-fastest 40-yard dash (5.09 seconds), tied for the fourth-most repetitions in the bench press (33), and was sixth in the three-cone drill (7.53 seconds) among all offensive linemen who participated. He scored a 23 on the Wonderlic Test. Smith drew comparisons to Ryan Clady.

Pre-draft measurables
Height	Weight	Arm length	Hand span	40-yard dash	10-yard split	20-yard split	20-yard shuttle	Three-cone drill	Vertical jump	Broad jump	Bench press	Wonderlic
6 ft 5 in (1.96 m)	309 lb (140 kg)	33 3/4 in (0.86 m)	9 3/4 in (0.25 m)	5.22 s	1.85 s	3.05 s	4.69 s	7.53 s	24 in (0.61 m)	8 ft 0 in (2.44 m)	33 reps	23
All values from NFL Combine

=== St. Louis Rams ===
Smith was selected in the first round with the second overall pick in the 2009 NFL draft by the St. Louis Rams. He was Baylor's first first-round draft pick since Daryl Gardener in 1996. On July 30, 2009, the Rams agreed to terms with Smith on a six-year contract worth up to $61 million, with $33 million in guarantees.

As a rookie in 2009, Smith played mostly right tackle, although he played some left tackle, the position for which he was drafted. In his rookie season, Smith suffered a serious concussion November 22, 2009. "My situation was real serious," Smith related, and it caused him to miss the remainder of his rookie season. In 2010, Smith was beaten out by rookie Rodger Saffold.

=== New York Jets ===
The St. Louis Rams agreed to trade Smith to the New York Jets in exchange for tackle Wayne Hunter on August 27, 2012. He was released from the Jets on February 19, 2013.

=== New Orleans Saints ===
On April 11, 2013, Smith signed with the New Orleans Saints. On August 21, he was released by the Saints.

=== New York Jets (second stint) ===
On August 23, 2013, Smith was re-signed by the New York Jets. He was released by the Jets on August 31.

== Coaching career ==
=== Abilene Christian ===
On January 25, 2024, Smith was hired as the tight ends coach at Abilene Christian.
