= 2012 New York Jets season =

2012 season of NFL team New York Jets

- Owner: Woody & Christopher Johnson
- General manager: Mike Tannenbaum
- Head coach: Rex Ryan
- Home stadium: MetLife Stadium

Results
- Record: 6–10
- Division place: 3rd AFC East
- Playoffs: Did not qualify
- Pro Bowlers: S LaRon Landry; CB Antonio Cromartie

Uniform
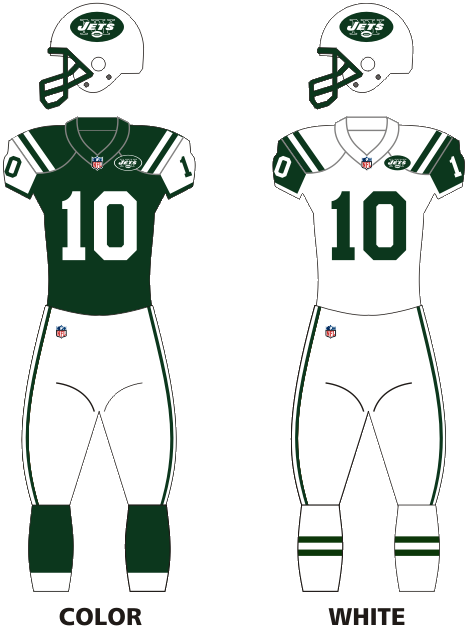

The 2012 season was the New York Jets' 43rd season in the National Football League (NFL), their 53rd overall, their seventh and final under general manager Mike Tannenbaum and their fourth under head coach Rex Ryan. The Jets failed to improve their 8–8 record from 2011. They finished with a losing record and were eliminated from postseason contention for the second straight season.

2012 was overall one of the most turbulent seasons in franchise history. The team was distracted by increased media presence during the off-season due to a quarterback controversy between incumbent starter Mark Sanchez and trade acquisition Tim Tebow. In addition, numerous blunders on and off the field as well as injuries often led to sloppy play, and the team was compared to a "circus".

On November 22, against the New England Patriots on Thanksgiving, Mark Sanchez fumbled after running into lineman Brandon Moore, and Steve Gregory ran back a 32-yard fumble return for a touchdown. The game is known now by Jets fans as the infamous "butt fumble" play and was considered the low point of the season. After that it was all downhill as the Jets suffered their first losing season since 2007. The Jets' offense scored only 281 points, ranking them 30th in the league, while the defense was ranked 8th best in the league.

== Transactions ==
=== Coaching changes ===
- The contracts of wide receivers coach Henry Ellard, outside linebackers coach Jeff Weeks and assistant head coach/offensive line coach Bill Callahan expired after the conclusion of the 2011 season and subsequently they were not retained. Ellard and Callahan, when offered contract extensions prior to the expiration of their contracts, refused to re-sign.
- Mike Smith was promoted from his position as a defensive intern to the outside linebackers coach, replacing Jeff Weeks. Smith later left the team to become the linebackers coach and co-coordinator at West Virginia. He returned to the Jets two weeks later after discovering his responsibilities with West Virginia were not the same as the team had first indicated.
- Tony Sparano was hired as the new offensive coordinator, replacing Brian Schottenheimer on January 11, 2012.
- Sanjay Lal was hired as the new wide receivers coach on January 13, 2012.
- Dave DeGuglielmo was hired as the new offensive line coach on January 24, 2012.
- On February 13, the team named Karl Dunbar as the new defensive line coach. In addition strength and conditioning coaching assistants Justus Galac and Paul Ricci were hired.
- Defensive line coach Mark Carrier left the team to accept the position as the Cincinnati Bengals' defensive backs coach.

=== Arrivals ===
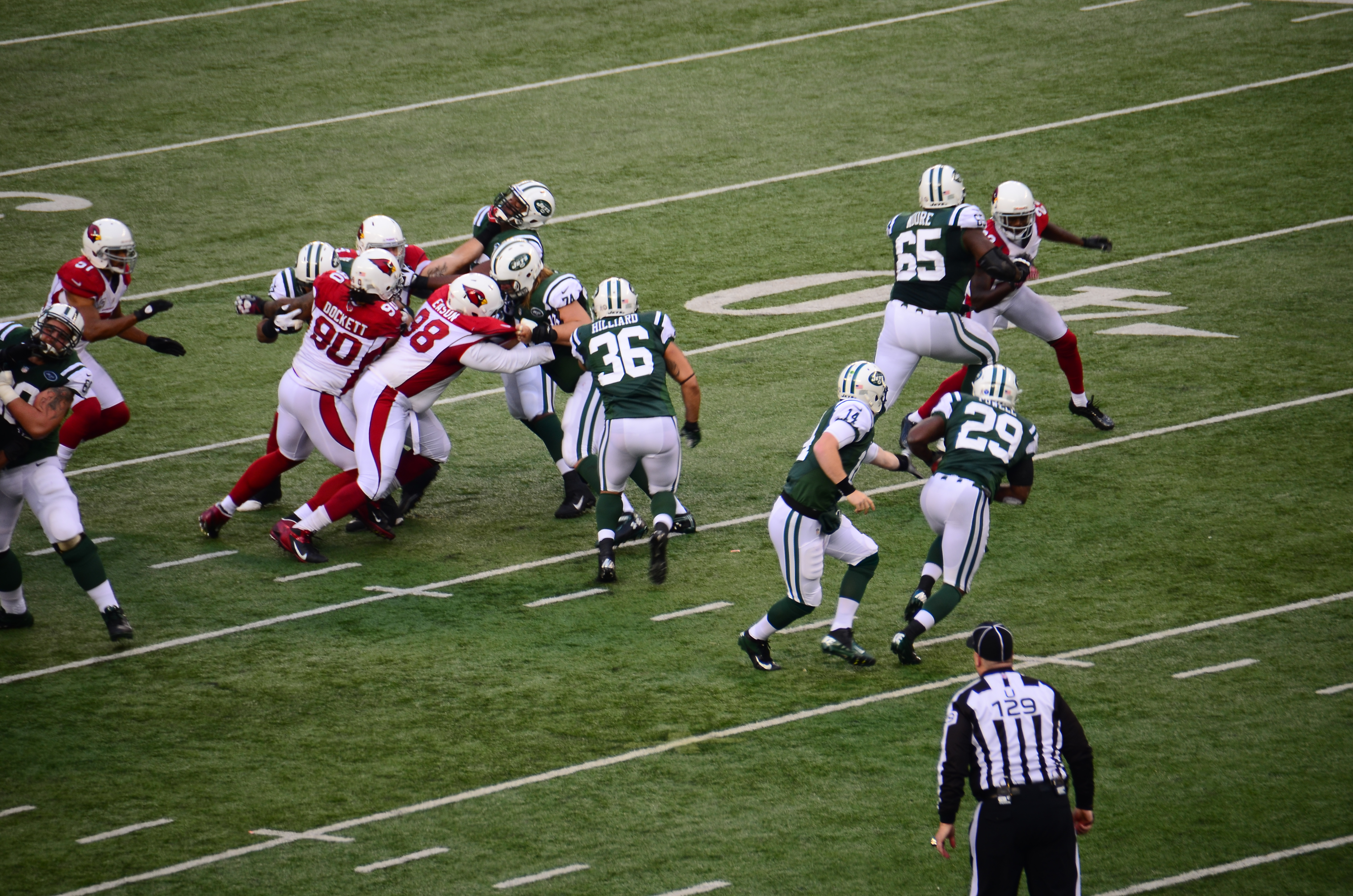
Greg McElroy hands off to Bilal Powell against Arizona Cardinals in week 13 of the 2012 season

- The Jets signed Michael Campbell, Dedrick Epps, Dexter Jackson, Dennis Landolt, Julian Posey, and Eron Riley to reserve/future contracts on January 2, 2012.
- The Jets signed Matt Kroul and John Griffin to reserve/future contracts on January 3, 2012.
- The Jets signed Royce Adams and Travis Baltz to reserve/future contracts on January 6, 2012.
- The Jets signed Eddie Jones to a reserve/future contract on January 9, 2012.
- The Jets signed Matthias Berning to a reserve/future contract on January 12, 2012.
- The Jets signed DaMarcus Ganaway to a reserve/future contract on January 17, 2012.
- The Jets signed Trevor Canfield to a reserve/future contract on January 21, 2012.
- The Jets signed Kris O'Dowd on March 13, 2012.
- The Jets signed Chaz Schilens and Drew Stanton on March 16, 2012.
- The Jets signed LaRon Landry on March 19, 2012.
- The Jets re-signed Scotty McKnight on March 26, 2012.
- The Jets signed Hayden Smith on April 3, 2012.
- The Jets signed DeAngelo Smith and Jay Richardson on April 16, 2012.
- The Jets re-signed DaMarcus Ganaway and signed undrafted free agents John Cullen, Marcus Dowtin, Donnie Fletcher, Damon Harrison, G. J. Kinne, Brian Linthicum, D'Anton Lynn, Ryan Steed, Donovan Robinson, and Brett Roy on April 29, 2012.
- The Jets signed Josh Brown on May 1, 2012.
- The Jets signed Derek Chard on May 2, 2012.
- The Jets signed Royce Pollard on May 5, 2012.
- The Jets signed Matt Simms and Fred Koloto on May 6, 2012.
- The Jets signed Yeremiah Bell and Terrence Campbell on May 18, 2012.
- The Jets signed Fui Vakapuna on May 22, 2012.
- The Jets signed Stephon Heyer and Ray Willis on May 29, 2012.
- The Jets signed Tarren Lloyd on May 31, 2012.
- The Jets signed Raymond Webber on June 19, 2012.
- The Jets signed Matt Hardison on June 22, 2012.
- The Jets signed Paul Cornick on July 12, 2012.
- The Jets signed Devon Torrence on August 1, 2012.
- The Jets signed Wes Kemp, Chris Forcier and Marcus Lott on August 2, 2012.
- The Jets signed Damario Ambrose on August 3, 2012.
- The Jets signed Joseph Collins and Stanley Arukwe on August 7, 2012.
- The Jets claimed Jeremy Stewart off waivers on August 8, 2012.
- The Jets signed LeQuan Lewis on August 15, 2012.
- The Jets claimed Spencer Lanning off waivers on August 28, 2012.
- The Jets claimed Isaako Aaitui, Clyde Gates, and Konrad Reuland off waivers and signed Paul Cornick, Marcus Dowtin, Donnie Fletcher, Royce Pollard, Ricky Sapp, Hayden Smith, and Jordan White to the practice squad on September 1, 2012.
- The Jets signed Antonio Allen to the practice squad on September 2, 2012.
- The Jets signed Marcus Dixon and Robert Malone on September 4, 2012.
- The Jets signed LeQuan Lewis to the practice squad on September 5, 2012.
- The Jets re-signed Ricky Sapp to the practice squad on September 11, 2012.
- The Jets signed Stanley Arukwe to the practice squad on September 12, 2012.

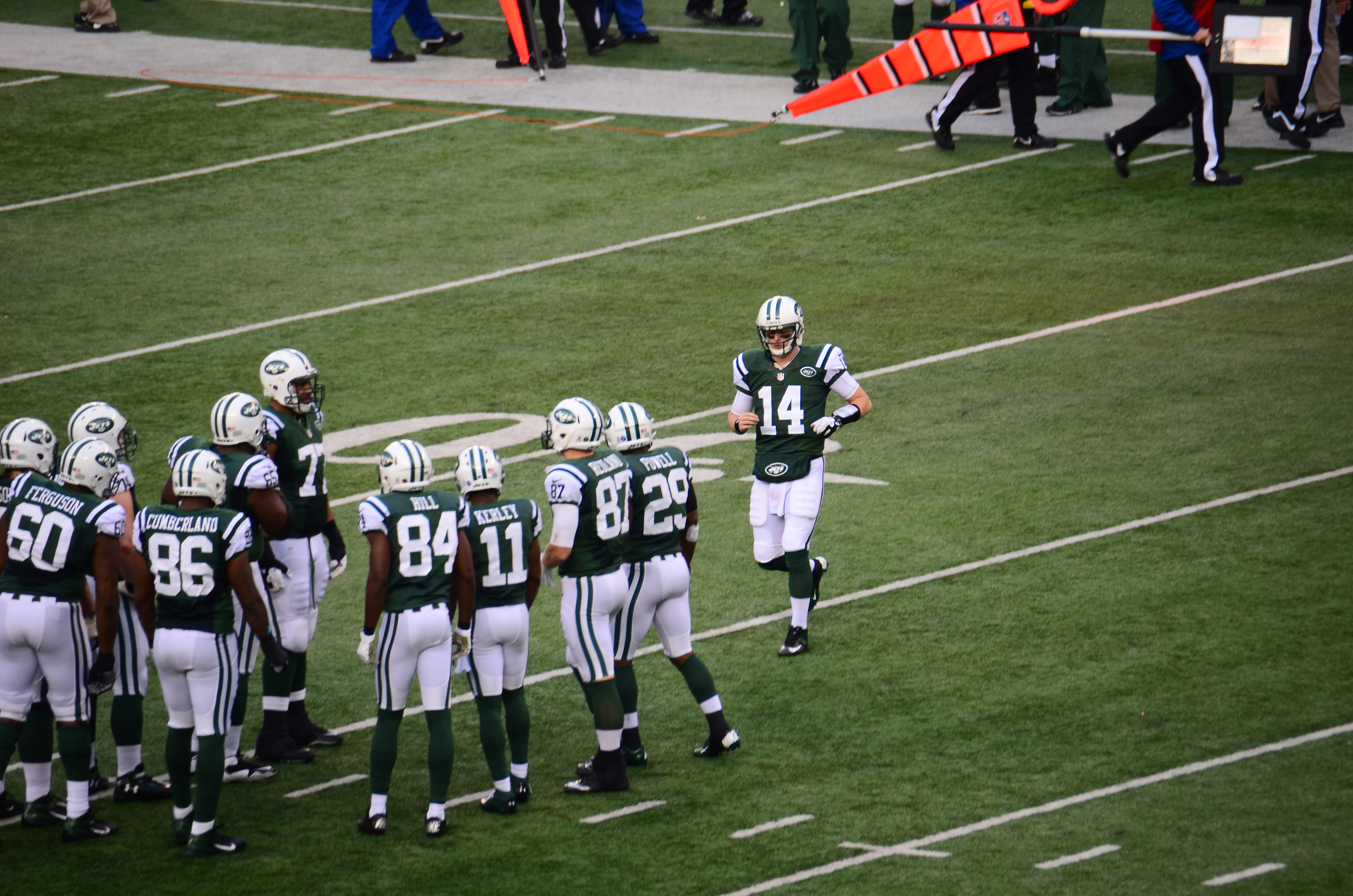
Greg McElroy and the Jets offense against Arizona

- The Jets signed Dedrick Epps off the Chicago Bears' practice squad on September 14, 2012.
- The Jets re-signed Royce Pollard to the practice squad on September 17, 2012.
- The Jets promoted Donnie Fletcher to the active roster on September 22, 2012.
- The Jets signed Patrick Turner and Bryan Thomas on September 24, 2012.
- The Jets signed Jonathan Grimes to the active roster and Donnie Fletcher to the practice squad on September 25, 2012.
- The Jets signed Dennis Landolt to the practice squad on September 27, 2012.
- The Jets signed Darrin Walls to the practice squad on September 28, 2012.
- The Jets signed Aaron Berry on October 1, 2012.
- The Jets signed Lex Hilliard to the active roster and Jordan White to the practice squad on October 2, 2012.
- The Jets signed Jason Hill on October 3, 2012.
- The Jets signed Daniel Muir on October 10, 2012.
- The Jets promoted Antonio Allen from the practice squad on October 12, 2012.
- The Jets signed Matt Hardison to the practice squad on October 16, 2012.
- The Jets promoted Marcus Dowtin from the practice squad and signed Donnie Fletcher to the practice squad on October 17, 2012.
- The Jets signed John Griffin and D. J. Bryant to the practice squad on November 5, 2012.
- The Jets signed Hayworth Hicks and re-signed Jason Hill on November 6, 2012.
- The Jets signed Kahlil Bell on November 13, 2012.
- The Jets promoted Jordan White, Darrin Walls, and Donnie Fletcher to the active roster from the practice squad on November 22, 2012.
- The Jets signed Mardy Gilyard to the active roster and Dennis Landolt and Eddie McGee to the practice squad on November 28, 2012.
- The Jets signed Jacquies Smith to the practice squad on December 3, 2012.
- The Jets signed Tevita Finau to the practice squad on December 5, 2012.
- The Jets promoted Antonio Allen to the active roster and re-signed Donnie Fletcher to the practice squad on December 6, 2012.
- The Jets signed Titus Ryan and JoJo Dickson to the practice squad on December 10, 2012.
- The Jets claimed Braylon Edwards off waivers on December 11, 2012.

=== Departures ===
- The Jets released Gerald Alexander and Michael Campbell on March 14, 2012.
- The Jets waived DaMarcus Ganaway on April 3, 2012.
- The Jets waived Taylor Boggs on April 12, 2012.
- The Jets waived Logan Payne on May 1, 2012.
- The Jets waived Ropati Pitoitua on May 2, 2012.
- The Jets waived Trevor Canfield on May 3, 2012.
- The Jets waived Kris O'Dowd on May 6, 2012.
- The Jets waived DeAngelo Smith and Eddie Jones on May 22, 2012.
- The Jets waived John Cullen on May 31, 2012.
- The Jets waived Donovan Robinson on June 18, 2012.
- The Jets waived Matthias Berning on June 19, 2012.
- The Jets waived G. J. Kinne and Ray Willis on June 28, 2012.
- The Jets waived Brian Linthicum on July 3, 2012.
- The Jets placed Royce Adams on the injured reserve list on July 31, 2012.
- The Jets waived Tracy Wilson and Fui Vakapuna on August 1, 2012.
- The Jets waived Scotty McKnight and DaMarcus Ganaway on August 6, 2012.
- The Jets waived Chris Forcier on August 7, 2012.
- The Jets waived John Griffin on August 8, 2012.
- The Jets waived Travis Baltz on August 12, 2012.
- The Jets waived Devon Torrence on August 14, 2012.
- The Jets released Stephon Heyer on August 20, 2012.
- The Jets waived Dexter Jackson, Raymond Webber, LeQuan Lewis, Terrence Campbell, Marcus Lott, Derek Chard and, Matt Hardison on August 25, 2012.
- The Jets released Josh Brown, waived/injured Josh Baker, and waived Damario Ambrose, Stanley Arukwe, Wes Kemp, and Jeremy Stewart on August 27, 2012.
- The Jets waived Ryan Steed on August 29, 2012.
- The Jets waived Terrance Ganaway, Royce Pollard, Jordan White, Hayden Smith, Paul Cornick, Ricky Sapp, Donnie Fletcher, Matt Simms, Joseph Collins, Eron Riley, Robert Griffin, Fred Koloto, Matt Kroul, Tarren Lloyd, Jay Richardson, Martin Tevaseu, Marcus Dowtin, Brett Roy, LeQuan Lewis, D'Anton Lynn, Julian Posey, and Spencer Lanning on August 31, 2012.
- The Jets waived Antonio Allen, Marcus Dixon, and Dedrick Epps on September 1, 2012.
- The Jets released Isaako Aaitui and T. J. Conley on September 4, 2012.
- The Jets released Ricky Sapp from the practice squad on September 5, 2012.
- The Jets waived Patrick Turner and released LeQuan Lewis from the practice squad on September 11, 2012.
- The Jets released Royce Pollard from the practice squad on September 12, 2012.
- The Jets released Stanley Arukwe from the practice squad on September 17, 2012.
- The Jets released Bryan Thomas on September 22, 2012.
- The Jets released Marcus Dixon and waived Dennis Landolt and Donnie Fletcher on September 24, 2012.
- The Jets released Paul Cornick from the practice squad on September 27, 2012.
- The Jets released Jordan White from the practice squad on September 29, 2012.
- The Jets waived/injured Dedrick Epps on October 1, 2012.
- The Jets waived Patrick Turner from the active roster and released Donnie Fletcher from the practice squad on October 2, 2012.
- The Jets released John Connor on October 17, 2012.
- The Jets waived Jonathan Grimes and Daniel Muir from the active roster and released Dennis Landolt from the practice squad on October 30, 2012.
- The Jets waived Antonio Allen on November 6, 2012.
- The Jets released Aaron Maybin on November 13, 2012.
- The Jets waived Jason Hill and Marcus Dowtin on November 20, 2012.
- The Jets waived Hayworth Hicks on November 27, 2012.
- The Jets waived Donnie Fletcher from the active roster and released D. J. Bryant from the practice squad on December 4, 2012.
- The Jets released Matt Hardison and Eddie McGee from the practice squad on December 10, 2012.
- The Jets waived Kahlil Bell on December 10, 2012.
- The Jets waived Mardy Gilyard on December 24, 2012.

=== Trades ===
==== To Jets ====
- The Denver Broncos traded Tim Tebow and a 2012 seventh round pick for the Jets 2012 fourth and sixth round draft picks on March 21, 2012.
- The Carolina Panthers traded Jeff Otah for an undisclosed draft pick on July 23, 2012. The trade was voided on July 31 after Otah failed to pass a physical with the team.
- The St. Louis Rams traded Jason Smith for the Jets' offensive tackle Wayne Hunter on August 27, 2012.

==== From Jets ====
- Drew Stanton was traded to the Indianapolis Colts along with a 2012 7th round draft pick on March 23, 2012, in exchange for a 2012 6th-round draft pick.

=== 2012 draft class ===
RD	PK	Player	Position	College	Notes
1	16 (16)	Quinton Coples	Defensive end	North Carolina	
2	11 (43)	Stephen Hill	Wide receiver	Georgia Tech	From Seattle Seahawks for Draft Picks Round 2 Pick 47, Round 5 Pick 154, and Round 7 Pick 232.
2	15 (47)	Traded to the Seattle Seahawks for Draft Pick Round 2 Pick 43.			
3	14 (77)	Demario Davis	Inside Linebacker	Arkansas State	
4	13 (108)	Traded to the Denver Broncos for QB Tim Tebow.			
5	19 (154)	Traded to the Seattle Seahawks for Draft Pick Round 2 Pick 43.			
6	17 (187)	Josh Bush	Safety	Wake Forest	From Indianapolis Colts through Philadelphia Eagles for QB Drew Stanton.
6	18 (188)	Traded to the Denver Broncos for QB Tim Tebow.			
6	32 (202)	Terrance Ganaway	Running back	Baylor	Compensatory selection.
6	33 (203)	Robert Griffin	Guard	Baylor	Compensatory selection.
7	7 (214)	From Jacksonville Jaguars for CB Dwight Lowery, then traded to the Indianapolis Colts along with QB Drew Stanton.			
7	17 (224)	Traded to the Green Bay Packers for OL Caleb Schlauderaff.			
7	25 (232)	From Denver Broncos for QB Tim Tebow, then traded to the Seattle Seahawks for Draft Pick Round 2 Pick 43.			
7	35 (242)	Antonio Allen	Safety	South Carolina	Compensatory selection.
7	37 (244)	Jordan White	Wide receiver	Western Michigan	Compensatory selection.

NOTES:

- The Jets were awarded four compensatory selections after losing free agents Braylon Edwards, Drew Coleman, Steve Weatherford, Shaun Ellis, and Brad Smith.

=== Free agents ===
Position	Player	Free agency tag	Date signed/released	2012 team	Notes
QB	Mark Brunell	UFA	–	–	–
WR	Plaxico Burress	UFA	November 20, 2012	Pittsburgh Steelers	
CB	Marquice Cole	RFA	March 19, 2012	New England Patriots	
PK	Nick Folk	UFA	March 14, 2012	New York Jets	
CB	Ellis Lankster	ERFA	January 4, 2012	New York Jets	
S	Jim Leonhard	UFA	August 4, 2012	Denver Broncos	
LB	Aaron Maybin	RFA	February 24, 2012	New York Jets	
TE	Matthew Mulligan	RFA	March 26, 2012	St. Louis Rams	
QB	Kevin O'Connell	UFA	July 29, 2012	San Diego Chargers	
S	Brodney Pool	UFA	March 15, 2012	Dallas Cowboys	
DL	Sione Pouha	UFA	March 12, 2012	New York Jets	
CB	Donald Strickland	UFA	–	–	–
LB	Bryan Thomas	UFA	March 13, 2012	New York Jets	
RB	LaDainian Tomlinson	UFA	June 18, 2012	Retired	
WR	Patrick Turner	RFA	February 7, 2012	New York Jets	
OL	Robert Turner	UFA	March 30, 2012	St. Louis Rams	
LB	Jamaal Westerman	RFA	March 15, 2012	Miami Dolphins	
RFA: Restricted free agent, UFA: Unrestricted free agent, ERFA: Exclusive rights free agent, FT: Franchise tag

== Preseason ==
Week	Date	Opponent	Result	Record	Venue	Recap
1	August 10	at Cincinnati Bengals	L 6–17	0–1	Paul Brown Stadium	Recap
2	August 18	New York Giants	L 3–26	0–2	MetLife Stadium	Recap
3	August 26	Carolina Panthers	L 12–17	0–3	MetLife Stadium	Recap
4	August 30	at Philadelphia Eagles	L 10–28	0–4	Lincoln Financial Field	Recap

== Regular season ==
=== Schedule ===
Week	Date	Opponent	Result	Record	Venue	Recap
1	September 9	**Buffalo Bills**	**W** 48–28	1–0	MetLife Stadium	Recap
2	September 16	at Pittsburgh Steelers	**L** 10–27	1–1	Heinz Field	Recap
3	September 23	at **Miami Dolphins**	**W** 23–20 (OT)	2–1	Sun Life Stadium	Recap
4	September 30	San Francisco 49ers	**L** 0–34	2–2	MetLife Stadium	Recap
5	October 8	Houston Texans	**L** 17–23	2–3	MetLife Stadium	Recap
6	October 14	Indianapolis Colts	**W** 35–9	3–3	MetLife Stadium	Recap
7	October 21	at **New England Patriots**	**L** 26–29 (OT)	3–4	Gillette Stadium	Recap
8	October 28	**Miami Dolphins**	**L** 9–30	3–5	MetLife Stadium	Recap
9	Bye					
10	November 11	at Seattle Seahawks	**L** 7–28	3–6	CenturyLink Field	Recap
11	November 18	at St. Louis Rams	**W** 27–13	4–6	Edward Jones Dome	Recap
12	November 22	**New England Patriots**	**L** 19–49	4–7	MetLife Stadium	Recap
13	December 2	Arizona Cardinals	**W** 7–6	5–7	MetLife Stadium	Recap
14	December 9	at Jacksonville Jaguars	**W** 17–10	6–7	EverBank Field	Recap
15	December 17	at Tennessee Titans	**L** 10–14	6–8	LP Field	Recap
16	December 23	San Diego Chargers	**L** 17–27	6–9	MetLife Stadium	Recap
17	December 30	at **Buffalo Bills**	**L** 9–28	6–10	Ralph Wilson Stadium	Recap

Note: Intra-division opponents are in bold text.

=== Standings ===
==== Division ====
AFC East
	W	L	T	PCT	DIV	CONF	PF	PA	STK
^{(2)} New England Patriots	12	4	0	.750	6–0	11–1	557	331	W2
Miami Dolphins	7	9	0	.438	2–4	5–7	288	317	L1
New York Jets	6	10	0	.375	2–4	4–8	281	375	L3
Buffalo Bills	6	10	0	.375	2–4	5–7	344	435	W1

==== Conference ====
AFC
#	Team	Division	W	L	T	PCT	DIV	CONF	SOS	SOV	STK
**Division winners**
1	Denver Broncos	West	13	3	0	.813	6–0	10–2	.457	.385	W11
2 (Note: New England clinched the AFC's No. 2 seed over Houston based on a head-to-head victory.)	New England Patriots	East	12	4	0	.750	6–0	11–1	.496	.466	W2
3	Houston Texans	South	12	4	0	.750	5–1	10–2	.496	.432	L2
4 (Note: Baltimore clinched the AFC North title over Cincinnati based on a better divisional record (4–2 to 3–3).)	Baltimore Ravens	North	10	6	0	.625	4–2	8–4	.496	.438	L1
**Wild cards**
5	Indianapolis Colts	South	11	5	0	.688	4–2	8–4	.441	.403	W2
6	Cincinnati Bengals	North	10	6	0	.625	3–3	7–5	.438	.381	W3
**Did not qualify for the postseason**
7	Pittsburgh Steelers	North	8	8	0	.500	3–3	5–7	.465	.438	W1
8 (Note: San Diego finished with a better conference record than Miami (7–5 to 5–7).)	San Diego Chargers	West	7	9	0	.438	4–2	7–5	.457	.286	W2
9	Miami Dolphins	East	7	9	0	.438	2–4	5–7	.500	.415	L1
10 (Note: Tennessee finished ahead of New York Jets based on head-to-head victory.)	Tennessee Titans	South	6	10	0	.375	1–5	5–7	.512	.344	W1
11 (Note: New York Jets finished ahead of Buffalo in the AFC East based on record versus common opponents (5–7 to 3–9).)	New York Jets	East	6	10	0	.375	2–4	4–8	.512	.401	L3
12	Buffalo Bills	East	6	10	0	.375	2–4	5–7	.480	.281	W1
13	Cleveland Browns	North	5	11	0	.313	2–4	5–7	.508	.388	L3
14	Oakland Raiders	West	4	12	0	.250	2–4	4–8	.469	.219	L2
15 (Note: Jacksonville finished with a better conference record than Kansas City (2–10 to 0–12).)	Jacksonville Jaguars	South	2	14	0	.125	2–4	2–10	.539	.531	L5
16	Kansas City Chiefs	West	2	14	0	.125	0–6	0–12	.516	.438	L4
**Tiebreakers** (Note: When breaking ties for three or more teams under the NFL's rules, they are first broken within divisions, then comparing only the highest ranked remaining team from each division.)

== Staff ==
2012 New York Jets staff
Front office: Chairman/CEO – Woody Johnson; President – Neil Glat; Executive vice president/general manager – Mike Tannenbaum; Assistant general manager – Scott Cohen; Senior personnel executive – Terry Bradway; Assistant director of player personnel – JoJo Wooden; Director of pro personnel – Brendan Phophett; Director of college scouting – Jeff Bauer; Assistant director of college scouting – Michael Davis; Head coaches: Head coach – Rex Ryan; Assistant head coach/linebackers – Bob Sutton; Offensive coaches: Offensive coordinator – Tony Sparano; Quarterbacks – Matt Cavanaugh; Running backs – Anthony Lynn; Wide receivers – Sanjay Lal; Assistant tight ends/offensive quality control – Lance Taylor; Offensive line – Dave DeGuglielmo; Assistant offensive line/tight ends – Mike Devlin; Seasonal intern – Tony Sparano Jr	Defensive coaches: Defensive coordinator – Mike Pettine; Defensive line – Karl Dunbar; Assistant defensive line – Anthony Weaver; Outside linebackers – Jeff Weeks; Outside linebackers – Mike Smith; Defensive backs/secondary – Dennis Thurman; Assistant defensive backs – Jim O'Neil; Defensive quality control – Brian Smith; Quality control – Mark DeLeone; Special teams coaches: Special teams coordinator – Mike Westhoff; Assistant special teams – Ben Kotwica; Strength and conditioning: Head strength and conditioning – Bill Hughan; Assistant strength and conditioning – Justus Galac; Assistant strength and conditioning/strength assistant – Paul Ricci; Strength and conditioning intern – Pierre Ngo; Training camp strength and conditioning intern – Jamey Mroz

== Rosters ==
=== Opening training camp roster ===
2012 New York Jets Opening training camp roster
Quarterbacks (QB): 14 Greg McElroy; 6 Mark Sanchez; 9 Matt Simms; 15 Tim Tebow; Running backs (RB): 38 John Conner FB; 42 Terrance Ganaway; 23 Shonn Greene; 34 John Griffin; 25 Joe McKnight; 29 Bilal Powell; 22 Fui Vakapuna FB; Wide receivers (WR): 87 DaMarcus Ganaway; 84 Stephen Hill; 10 Santonio Holmes; 89 Dexter Jackson; 11 Jeremy Kerley; 16 Scotty McKnight; 18 Royce Pollard; 19 Eron Riley; 85 Chaz Schilens; 88 Patrick Turner; 1 Raymond Webber; Tight ends (TE): 45 Josh Baker; 86 Jeff Cumberland; 83 Dedrick Epps; 81 Dustin Keller; 43 Tarren Lloyd; 82 Hayden Smith	Offensive linemen (OL): 69 Paul Cornick T; 62 Vladimir Ducasse G; 60 D'Brickashaw Ferguson T; 75 Robert Griffin G; 67 Stephon Heyer T; 77 Austin Howard T; 78 Wayne Hunter T; 64 Fred Koloto C; 66 Matt Kroul G; 76 Dennis Landolt T; 74 Nick Mangold C; 65 Brandon Moore G; 72 Caleb Schlauderaff C; 68 Matt Slauson G; Defensive linemen (DL): 98 Quinton Coples DE; 70 Mike DeVito DT; 94 Marcus Dixon DT; 93 Kenrick Ellis DT; 61 Matt Hardison DT; 71 Damon Harrison DT; 51 Aaron Maybin DE; 50 Garrett McIntyre DE; 97 Calvin Pace DE; 91 Sione Pouha DT; 92 Jay Richardson DE; 47 Brett Roy DE; 55 Ricky Sapp DE; 95 Martin Tevaseu DT; 58 Bryan Thomas DE; 96 Muhammad Wilkerson DT	Linebackers (LB): 54 Nick Bellore MLB; 44 Marcus Dowtin MLB; 52 David Harris MLB; 53 Josh Mauga OLB; 57 Bart Scott OLB; Defensive backs (DB): 27 Royce Adams CB; 39 Antonio Allen SS; 37 Yeremiah Bell SS; 32 Josh Bush FS; 31 Antonio Cromartie CB; 34 Donnie Fletcher CB; 30 LaRon Landry SS; 26 Ellis Lankster CB; 41 D'Anton Lynn CB; 21 Julian Posey CB; 24 Darrelle Revis CB; 33 Eric Smith FS; 40 Ryan Steed CB; 35 Isaiah Trufant CB; 20 Kyle Wilson CB; 36 Tracy Wilson FS; Special teams (ST): 5 Travis Baltz P; 3 Josh Brown K; 59 Derek Chard LS; 4 T. J. Conley P; 2 Nick Folk K; 46 Tanner Purdum LS	Practice squad: 7 Andy Crane QB; 70 Colton Davis DL; 18 Jayshawn Menikins WR; 34 Joey Contelli DB; Reserve: 63 Terrence Campbell G (Active/PUP); 49 Demario Davis OLB (Active/PUP); 79 Jeff Otah T (Active/PUP); 17 Jordan White WR (Active/PUP); Rookies in italics, 0 practice squad

=== Week 1 roster ===
Quarterbacks (QB): 14 Greg McElroy; 6 Mark Sanchez; 15 Tim Tebow; Running backs (RB): 38 John Conner FB; 23 Shonn Greene; 25 Joe McKnight; 29 Bilal Powell; Wide receivers (WR): 19 Clyde Gates; 84 Stephen Hill; 10 Santonio Holmes; 11 Jeremy Kerley; 85 Chaz Schilens; 88 Patrick Turner; Tight ends (TE): 86 Jeff Cumberland; 81 Dustin Keller; 87 Konrad Reuland	Offensive linemen (OL): 62 Vladimir Ducasse G; 60 D'Brickashaw Ferguson T; 77 Austin Howard T; 76 Dennis Landolt T; 74 Nick Mangold C; 65 Brandon Moore G; 72 Caleb Schlauderaff C; 68 Matt Slauson G; 63 Jason Smith T; Defensive linemen (DL): 98 Quinton Coples DE; 70 Mike DeVito DE; 94 Marcus Dixon DE; 93 Kenrick Ellis NT; 71 Damon Harrison NT; 91 Sione Pouha NT; 96 Muhammad Wilkerson DE	Linebackers (LB): 54 Nick Bellore ILB; 56 Demario Davis ILB; 52 David Harris ILB; 53 Josh Mauga ILB; 51 Aaron Maybin OLB; 50 Garrett McIntyre OLB; 97 Calvin Pace OLB; 57 Bart Scott ILB; 58 Bryan Thomas OLB; Defensive backs (DB): 37 Yeremiah Bell SS; 32 Josh Bush FS; 31 Antonio Cromartie CB; 30 LaRon Landry FS; 26 Ellis Lankster CB; 24 Darrelle Revis CB; 33 Eric Smith S; 35 Isaiah Trufant CB; 20 Kyle Wilson CB; Special teams (ST): 2 Nick Folk K; 3 Robert Malone P; 46 Tanner Purdum LS	Practice squad: 39 Antonio Allen SS; 69 Paul Cornick T; 44 Marcus Dowtin ILB; 34 Donnie Fletcher CB; 22 LeQuan Lewis CB; 18 Royce Pollard WR; 82 Hayden Smith TE; 17 Jordan White WR; Reserve: -- Royce Adams CB (IR); 45 Josh Baker FB (IR) 53 active, 8 practice squad, 2 reserve Rookies in italics; Roster; Depth chart; Transactions

=== Final roster ===
2012 New York Jets roster
Quarterbacks (QB): 14 Greg McElroy; 6 Mark Sanchez; 15 Tim Tebow; Running backs (RB): 23 Shonn Greene; 21 John Griffin; 36 Lex Hilliard FB; 25 Joe McKnight KR; 29 Bilal Powell; Wide receivers (WR): 17 Braylon Edwards; 19 Clyde Gates; 11 Jeremy Kerley PR; 85 Chaz Schilens; 89 Jordan White; Tight ends (TE): 86 Jeff Cumberland; 81 Dustin Keller; 87 Konrad Reuland; 82 Hayden Smith	Offensive linemen (OL): 62 Vladimir Ducasse G; 60 D'Brickashaw Ferguson T; 77 Austin Howard T; 76 Dennis Landolt T; 74 Nick Mangold C; 65 Brandon Moore G; 72 Caleb Schlauderaff C/G; 68 Matt Slauson G; 63 Jason Smith T; Defensive linemen (DL): 98 Quinton Coples DE; 70 Mike DeVito DE; 93 Kenrick Ellis NT; 71 Damon Harrison NT; 91 Sione Po'uha NT; 96 Muhammad Wilkerson DE	Linebackers (LB): 54 Nick Bellore ILB; 56 Demario Davis ILB; 52 David Harris ILB; 50 Garrett McIntyre OLB; 97 Calvin Pace OLB; 55 Ricky Sapp OLB; 57 Bart Scott ILB; 58 Bryan Thomas OLB; Defensive backs (DB): 39 Antonio Allen S; 37 Yeremiah Bell FS; 32 Josh Bush SS; 31 Antonio Cromartie CB; 34 Donnie Fletcher CB; 30 LaRon Landry SS; 26 Ellis Lankster CB; 33 Eric Smith FS; 27 Darrin Walls CB; 20 Kyle Wilson CB; Special teams (ST): 2 Nick Folk K; 3 Robert Malone P; 46 Tanner Purdum LS	Practice squad: 49 JoJo Dickson LB; 92 Tevita Finau DE; 18 Royce Pollard WR; 51 Jacquies Smith LB; 9 Andy Crane QB; Reserve: 45 Josh Baker TE (IR); 22 Aaron Berry CB (IR); 83 Dedrick Epps TE (IR); 84 Stephen Hill WR (IR); 10 Santonio Holmes WR (IR); 53 Josh Mauga ILB (IR); 24 Darrelle Revis CB (IR); 35 Isaiah Trufant CB (IR); Rookies in italics 53 active, 8 reserve, 5 practice squad

== Regular season results ==
=== Week 1: vs. Buffalo Bills ===
Week One: Buffalo Bills at New York Jets – Game summary

Quarter	1	2	3	4	Total
Bills	0	7	7	14	28
Jets	7	20	14	7	48

at MetLife Stadium, East Rutherford, New Jersey

- Date: September 9
- Game time: 1:00 p.m. EDT
- Game weather: 74 °F (23 °C), sunny
- Game attendance: 79,088
- Referee: Robert Frazer
- TV announcers (CBS): Marv Albert and Rich Gannon
- Recap

Game information

First quarter

- Jeremy Kerley 12-yard pass from Mark Sanchez (Nick Folk kick) Jets 7–0, Drive: 8 plays, 61 yards, 3:49.

Second quarter

- Stephen Hill 33-yard pass from Mark Sanchez (Nick Folk kick) Jets 14–0, Drive: 5 plays, 52 yards, 2:31.
- Jeremy Kerley 68-yard punt return Jets 21–0
- C. J. Spiller 56-yard run (Rian Lindell kick), Jets 21–7, Drive: 7 plays, 80 yards, 3:34.
- Nick Folk 25-yard field goal, Jets 24–7, Drive: 15 plays, 73 yards, 7:09.
- Nick Folk 39-yard field goal, Jets 27–7, Drive: 7 plays, 32 yards, 1:24.

Third quarter

- Antonio Cromartie 40-yard interception return (Nick Folk kick), Jets 34–7
- Stephen Hill 33-yard pass from Mark Sanchez (Nick Folk kick) Jets 41–7, Drive: 4 plays, 48 yards, 2:10.
- Scott Chandler 5-yard pass from Ryan Fitzpatrick (Rian Lindell kick), Jets 41–14, Drive: 9 plays, 77 yards, 5:12.

Fourth quarter

- Donald Jones 6-yard pass from Ryan Fitzpatrick (Rian Lindell kick), Jets 41–21, Drive: 13 plays, 96 yards, 6:14.
- Stevie Johnson 29-yard pass from Ryan Fitzpatrick (Rian Lindell kick), Jets 41–28, Drive: 5 plays, 41 yards, 0:54.
- Shonn Greene 1-yard run (Nick Folk kick), Jets 48–28, Drive: 8 plays, 49 yards, 4:41.

Top passers

- BUF – Ryan Fitzpatrick – 18/32, 195 yards, 3 TD, 3 INT
- NYJ – Mark Sanchez – 19/27, 266 yards, 3 TD, 1 INT

Top rushers

- BUF – C. J. Spiller – 14 rushes, 169 yards, 1 TD
- NYJ – Shonn Greene – 27 rushes, 94 yards, 1 TD

Top receivers

- BUF – Stevie Johnson – 4 receptions, 55 yards, 1 TD
- NYJ – Stephen Hill – 5 receptions, 89 yards, 2 TD

Top tacklers

- BUF – Nick Barnett – 5 tackles, 4 assists
- NYJ – LaRon Landry – 6 tackles, 1 assist, 1 forced fumble

The Jets erupted to a 21–0 lead in the second quarter following two Mark Sanchez touchdown throws and a Jeremy Kerley punt return score. Following Antonio Cromartie's interception return score and Sanchez' third touchdown (to Stephen Hill), Ryan Fitzpatrick, despite three interceptions, erupted to three consecutive touchdowns, but the Jets put the game away in a fourth quarter drive ending in a one-yard Shonn Greene touchdown run.

Tim Tebow, acquired from the Broncos amid heavy publicity about his presence with the Jets and the team's plans on how to utilize him, rushed five times for just eleven yards.

With their 6th straight win over the Bills, the Jets began their season 1–0.

=== Week 2: at Pittsburgh Steelers ===
Week Two: New York Jets at Pittsburgh Steelers – Game summary

Quarter	1	2	3	4	Total
Jets	7	3	0	0	10
Steelers	3	10	7	7	27

at Heinz Field, Pittsburgh, Pennsylvania

- Date: September 16
- Game time: 4:25 p.m. EDT
- Game weather: 71 °F (22 °C), fair
- Game attendance: 64,511
- Referee: Jerry Frump
- TV announcers (CBS): Jim Nantz and Phil Simms
- Recap

Game information

First quarter

Second quarter

Third quarter

Fourth quarter

Top passers

- NYJ –
- PIT –

Top rushers

- NYJ –
- PIT –

Top receivers

- NYJ –
- PIT –

Top tacklers

- NYJ –
- PIT –

The Jets traveled to Heinz Field for a rematch of the 2010 AFC Championship game against the Steelers. The Jets limited the Steelers to just 68 rushing yards but Ben Roethlisberger tossed for 275 yards and two touchdowns. With the loss, the Jets fell to 1–1.

=== Week 3: at Miami Dolphins ===
Week Three: New York Jets at Miami Dolphins – Game summary

Quarter	1	2	3	4	OT	Total
Jets	0	3	7	10	3	23
Dolphins	7	3	7	3	0	20

at Sun Life Stadium, Miami Gardens, Florida

- Date: September 23
- Game time: 1:00 p.m. EDT
- Game weather: 83 °F (28 °C), mostly cloudy
- Game attendance: 60,102
- Referee: Robert Frazer
- TV announcers (CBS): Marv Albert and Rich Gannon

Game information

First quarter

Second quarter

Third quarter

Fourth quarter

Top passers

- NYJ –
- MIA –

Top rushers

- NYJ –
- MIA –

Top receivers

- NYJ –
- MIA –

Top tacklers

- NYJ –
- MIA –

With the win, the Jets improved to 2–1. However, they lost star cornerback Darrelle Revis for the season as he suffered a torn ACL during the game.

=== Week 4: vs. San Francisco 49ers ===
Week Four: San Francisco 49ers at New York Jets – Game summary

Quarter	1	2	3	4	Total
49ers	0	10	7	17	34
Jets	0	0	0	0	0

at MetLife Stadium, East Rutherford, New Jersey

- Date: September 30
- Game time: 1:00 p.m. EDT
- Game weather: 67 °F (19 °C), partly cloudy
- Game attendance: 79,088
- Referee: Tony Corrente
- TV announcers (Fox): Kenny Albert, Daryl Johnston and Tony Siragusa

Game information

First quarter

Second quarter

Third quarter

Fourth quarter

Top passers

- SF –
- NYJ –

Top rushers

- SF –
- NYJ –

Top receivers

- SF –
- NYJ –

Top tacklers

- SF –
- NYJ –

After their Week 3 road win over their division rival Dolphins, the Jets headed home to face their first NFC Opponent of the season, the 49ers. However, the Jets struggled in this game being shut out at home 34–0 by the 49ers. This was the first time since 2010 that the team has been shut out at home since the Packers shut them out 9–0 that year. With the huge shutout loss, the Jets fell to 2–2.

=== Week 5: vs. Houston Texans ===
Week Five: Houston Texans at New York Jets – Game summary

Quarter	1	2	3	4	Total
Texans	7	10	6	0	23
Jets	7	0	7	3	17

at MetLife Stadium, East Rutherford, New Jersey

- Date: October 8
- Game time: 8:30 p.m. EDT
- Game weather: 52 °F (11 °C), partly cloudy
- Game attendance: 79,088
- Referee: Scott Green
- TV announcers (ESPN): Mike Tirico, Jon Gruden and Lisa Salters

Game information

First quarter

Second quarter

Third quarter

Fourth quarter

Top passers

- HOU –
- NYJ –

Top rushers

- HOU –
- NYJ –

Top receivers

- HOU –
- NYJ –

Top tacklers

- HOU –
- NYJ –

The Jets stayed home for a game against the red-hot undefeated 4–0 Texans. This game would mark the first time ever that the Jets have lost to the Texans, and as a result New York dropped to 2–3 on the season.

=== Week 6: vs. Indianapolis Colts ===
Week Six: Indianapolis Colts at New York Jets – Game summary

Quarter	1	2	3	4	Total
Colts	3	3	0	3	9
Jets	0	21	7	7	35

at MetLife Stadium, East Rutherford, New Jersey

- Date: October 14
- Game time: 1:00 p.m. EDT
- Game weather: 65 °F (18 °C), clear
- Game attendance: 79,088
- Referee: Bill Leavy
- TV announcers (CBS): Jim Nantz and Phil Simms

Game information

First quarter

Second quarter

Third quarter

Fourth quarter

Top passers

- IND –
- NYJ –

Top rushers

- IND –
- NYJ –

Top receivers

- IND –
- NYJ –

Top tacklers

- IND –
- NYJ –

The Jets faced Colts rookie sensation Andrew Luck; they sacked him four times and intercepted him twice. Shonn Greene and Joe McKnight combined to rush for 232 yards and three Greene touchdowns. Mark Sanchez threw for just 82 yards but had two touchdowns, while Tim Tebow had one throw for 23 yards but was limited to seven rushing yards.

The huge win was the Jets' first win over the Colts without Peyton Manning since 1997. They improved to 3–3 and a four-way tie in the AFC East.

=== Week 7: at New England Patriots ===
Week Seven: New York Jets at New England Patriots – Game summary

Quarter	1	2	3	4	OT	Total
Jets	7	3	3	13	0	26
Patriots	14	2	7	3	3	29

at Gillette Stadium, Foxborough, Massachusetts

- Date: October 21
- Game time: 4:25 p.m. EDT
- Game weather: 62 °F (17 °C), partly cloudy
- Game attendance: 68,752
- Referee: Jeff Triplette
- TV announcers (CBS): Jim Nantz and Phil Simms

Game information

First quarter

Second quarter

Third quarter

Fourth quarter

Top passers

- NYJ –
- NE –

Top rushers

- NYJ –
- NE –

Top receivers

- NYJ –
- NE –

Top tacklers

- NYJ –
- NE –

This game would determine who would be atop the AFC East. The Jets erased a 23–13 gap in the fourth quarter. After a Dustin Keller touchdown catch Devin McCourty fumbled the kickoff. Following back-to-back Nick Folk field goals, Tom Brady whipped the Patriots to the game-tying field goal in the final 1:37. In overtime Stephen Gostkowski booted a 48-yard field goal; the Jets got the ball back but Sanchez was strip-sacked by Rob Ninkovich and Jermaine Cunningham, ending the game in a 29–26 Jets loss, allowing the Patriots to take 1st Place and dropping the Jets to 3–4.

=== Week 8: vs. Miami Dolphins ===
Week Eight: Miami Dolphins at New York Jets – Game summary

Quarter	1	2	3	4	Total
Dolphins	10	10	7	3	30
Jets	0	0	3	6	9

at MetLife Stadium, East Rutherford, New Jersey

- Date: October 28
- Game time: 1:00 p.m. EDT
- Game weather: 60 °F (16 °C), Wind: NNE 9mph gusting to 17mph
- Game attendance: 79,088
- Referee: Walt Anderson
- TV announcers (CBS): Ian Eagle and Dan Fouts

Game information

First quarter

Second quarter

Third quarter

Fourth quarter

Top passers

- MIA –
- NYJ –

Top rushers

- MIA –
- NYJ –

Top receivers

- MIA –
- NYJ –

Top tacklers

- MIA –
- NYJ –

Despite losing rookie sensation Ryan Tannehill for the game after a first-quarter sack, the Dolphins raced to a 30–9 win, their fourth road win in the rivalry in their last five trips to New Jersey. The Dolphins scored on a blocked goalline punt, then added touchdowns by Daniel Thomas and a short toss from Matt Moore to Anthony Fasano. Sanchez managed a late touchdown to Chaz Schilens but the two-point throw to Dustin Keller failed.

=== Week 10: at Seattle Seahawks ===
Week Ten: New York Jets at Seattle Seahawks – Game summary

Quarter	1	2	3	4	Total
Jets	7	0	0	0	7
Seahawks	7	7	0	14	28

at CenturyLink Field, Seattle, Washington

- Date: November 11
- Game time: 4:05 p.m. EST/1:05 p.m. PST
- Game weather: 43 °F (6 °C), cloudy
- Game attendance: 67,841
- Referee: Ed Hochuli
- TV announcers (CBS): Marv Albert and Rich Gannon

Game information

First quarter

Second quarter

Third quarter

Fourth quarter

Top passers

- NYJ –
- SEA –

Top rushers

- NYJ –
- SEA –

Top receivers

- NYJ –
- SEA –

Top tacklers

- NYJ –
- SEA –

The surging Seahawks under former Jets coach Pete Carroll limited the Jets to 185 total yards of offense and forced two fumbles. Golden Tate caught a touchdown from Russell Wilson then took a reverse and threw to Sidney Rice for a fourth-quarter score. The Jets only score came when Wilson was strip-sacked and Muhammad Wilkerson ran in a 21-yard touchdown.

It was the Jets' second straight loss to the Seahawks, and they fell to 3–6 and 0–2 against the NFC West.

=== Week 11: at St. Louis Rams ===
Week Eleven: New York Jets at St. Louis Rams – Game summary

Quarter	1	2	3	4	Total
Jets	3	10	0	14	27
Rams	7	0	0	6	13

at Edward Jones Dome, St. Louis, Missouri

- Date: November 18
- Game time: 1:00 p.m. EST/12:00 p.m. CST
- Game weather: Played indoors (dome stadium)
- Game attendance: 57,711
- Referee: Jerome Boger
- TV announcers (CBS): Ian Eagle and Dan Fouts

Game information

First quarter

Second quarter

Third quarter

Fourth quarter

Top passers

- NYJ –
- STL –

Top rushers

- NYJ –
- STL –

Top receivers

- NYJ –
- STL –

Top tacklers

- NYJ –
- STL –

The Jets posted their sixth win in their last seven meetings against Jeff Fisher. They picked off Sam Bradford once and forced two Rams fumbles. The two teams combined for just 570 yards of offense. The Jets improved to 4–6 while the Rams fell to 3–6–1.

=== Week 12: vs. New England Patriots (Thanksgiving Day game) ===
Week Twelve: New England Patriots at New York Jets – Game summary

Quarter	1	2	3	4	Total
Patriots	0	35	0	14	49
Jets	0	3	9	7	19

at MetLife Stadium, East Rutherford, New Jersey

- Date: November 22
- Game time: 8:20 p.m. EST
- Game weather: 46 °F (8 °C), clear
- Game attendance: 79,088
- Referee: Mike Carey
- TV announcers (NBC): Al Michaels, Cris Collinsworth and Michele Tafoya

Game information

First quarter

- No scoring plays

Second quarter

- NE – Wes Welker 3-yard pass from Tom Brady (Stephen Gostkowski kick), 14:54. Patriots 7–0. Drive: 15 plays, 66 yards, 6:01.
- NE – Shane Vereen 83-yard pass from Tom Brady (Stephen Gostkowski kick), 9:43. Patriots 14–0. Drive: 1 play, 83 yards, 0:13.
- NE – Steve Gregory 32-yard fumble return (Stephen Gostkowski kick), 9:00. Patriots 21–0.
- NE – Julian Edelman 22-yard fumble return (Stephen Gostkowski kick), 8:51. Patriots 28–0.
- NE – Julian Edelman 56-yard pass from Tom Brady (Stephen Gostkowski kick), 3:08. Patriots 35–0. Drive: 4 plays, 75 yards, 1:53.
- NYJ – Nick Folk 32-yard field goal, 0:07. Patriots 35–3. Drive: 14 plays, 68 yards, 3:06.

Third quarter

- NYJ – Stevan Ridley penalty in end zone, 6:52. Patriots 35–5.
- NYJ – Bilal Powell 4-yard run (Nick Folk kick), 4:41. Patriots 35–12. Drive: 4 plays, 67 yards, 2:06.

Fourth quarter

- NE – Tom Brady 1-yard run (Stephen Gostkowski kick), 12:02. Patriots 42–12. Drive: 17 plays, 86 yards, 7:39.
- NE – Stevan Ridley 9-yard run (Stephen Gostkowski kick), 11:07. Patriots 49–12. Drive: 2 plays, 37 yards, 0:38.
- NYJ – Dustin Keller 1-yard pass from Mark Sanchez (Nick Folk kick), 2:21. Patriots 49–19. Drive: 6 plays, 69 yards, 1:40.

Top passers

- NE – Tom Brady – 18/27, 323 yards, 3 TD
- NYJ – Mark Sanchez – 26/36, 301 yards, TD, INT

Top rushers

- NE – Stevan Ridley – 21 rushes, 97 yards, TD
- NYJ – Shonn Greene – 14 rushes, 71 yards

Top receivers

- NE – Shane Vereen – 2 receptions, 91 yards, TD
- NYJ – Jeremy Kerley – 7 receptions, 86 yards

The Jets were thoroughly dominated by the Patriots; they scored five touchdowns in the second quarter, three of them in a span of 52 seconds of game clock. The first came on an 83-yard pass to Shane Vereen after the Patriots recovered a Shonn Greene fumble. On the Jets' ensuing drive, Mark Sanchez fumbled after running into lineman Brandon Moore, and Steve Gregory ran back a 32-yard score. The play later became known as the "butt fumble". The third touchdown came on the ensuing kickoff, Devin McCourty forced Joe McKnight to fumble, which Julian Edelman recovered and returned for a third touchdown (he later caught a 56-yard touchdown pass from Tom Brady).

With the huge loss, the Jets fell to 4–7, and were swept by Bill Belichick's Patriots for the sixth time.

This was the last time the Jets would appear on Sunday Night Football until 2023. They would be flexed out of Sunday Night Football twice before 2023.

=== Week 13: vs. Arizona Cardinals ===
Week Thirteen: Arizona Cardinals at New York Jets – Game summary

Quarter	1	2	3	4	Total
Cardinals	0	3	0	3	6
Jets	0	0	0	7	7

at MetLife Stadium, East Rutherford, New Jersey

- Date: December 2
- Game time: 1:00 p.m. EST
- Game weather: 46 °F (8 °C), cloudy
- Game attendance: 79,088
- Referee: Walt Anderson
- TV announcers (Fox): Thom Brennaman, Brian Billick and Laura Okmin

Game information

First quarter

- No scoring plays

Second quarter

- ARI – Jay Feely 48-yard field goal, 0:03. Cardinals 3–0. Drive: 10 plays, 61 yards, 2:31.

Third quarter

- No scoring plays

Fourth quarter

- NYJ – Jeff Cumberland 1-yard pass from Greg McElroy (Nick Folk kick), 14:55. Jets 7–3. Drive: 10 plays, 66 yards, 4:53.
- ARI – Jay Feely 35-yard field goal, 10:39. Jets 7–6. Drive: 6 plays, 21 yards, 2:03.

Top passers

- ARI – Rian Lindley – 10/31, 72 yards, INT
- NYJ – Mark Sanchez – 10/21, 97 yards, 3 INT

Top rushers

- ARI – Rashad Johnson – 1 rush, 40 yards
- NYJ – Shonn Greene – 24 rushes, 104 yards

Top receivers

- ARI – Larry Fitzgerald – 1 reception, 23 yards
- NYJ – Stephen Hill – 5 receptions, 40 yards

Mark Sanchez was benched in the fourth quarter and Greg McElroy threw the winning touchdown. The switch escalated brewing controversy over Sanchez's declining play.

=== Week 14: at Jacksonville Jaguars ===
Week Fourteen: New York Jets at Jacksonville Jaguars – Game summary

Quarter	1	2	3	4	Total
Jets	0	0	10	7	17
Jaguars	0	3	0	7	10

at EverBank Field, Jacksonville, Florida

- Date: December 9
- Game time: 1:00 p.m. EST
- Game weather: 67 °F (19 °C), rain
- Game attendance: 67,027
- Referee: Alberto Riveron
- TV announcers (CBS): Kevin Harlan and Solomon Wilcots

Game information

First quarter

Second quarter

Third quarter

Fourth quarter

Top passers

- NYJ –
- JAC –

Top rushers

- NYJ –
- JAC –

Top receivers

- NYJ –
- JAC –

Top tacklers

- NYJ –
- JAC –

The Jets improved to 6–7 and stayed alive in the playoff race after twice intercepting Chad Henne, who'd replaced faltering sophomore Blaine Gabbert four weeks earlier. The Jets had 166 rushing yards and two scores, limiting Mark Sanchez to just nineteen throws for 111 yards.

=== Week 15: at Tennessee Titans ===
Week Fifteen: New York Jets at Tennessee Titans – Game summary

Quarter	1	2	3	4	Total
Jets	3	0	7	0	10
Titans	0	7	7	0	14

at LP Field, Nashville, Tennessee

- Date: December 17
- Game time: 8:30 p.m. EST/7:30 p.m. CST
- Game weather: 54 °F (12 °C), cloudy
- Referee: Walt Coleman
- TV announcers (ESPN): Mike Tirico, Jon Gruden and Lisa Salters

Game information

First quarter

Second quarter

Third quarter

Fourth quarter

Top passers

- NYJ –
- TEN –

Top rushers

- NYJ –
- TEN –

Top receivers

- NYJ –
- TEN –

Top tacklers

- NYJ –
- TEN –

Chris Johnson ran in a 94-yard touchdown while following a Jeff Cumberland touchdown catch for the Jets Jake Locker ran in a 13-yard score. Mark Sanchez threw four interceptions yet a short Titans punt gave the Jets the ball inside the Titans 25 in the final minute. The Jets blew the snap and the Titans fell on the ball, ending the game.

With the loss, the Jets not only fell to 6–8, but got mathematically eliminated from postseason contention for the second straight season.

Tim Tebow entered the game for the first time since Week 10 and made what turned out to be his final plays with the Jets, missing on his only pass while rushing three times for fifteen yards.

=== Week 16: vs. San Diego Chargers ===
Week Sixteen: San Diego Chargers at New York Jets – Game summary

Quarter	1	2	3	4	Total
Chargers	7	3	14	3	27
Jets	14	0	0	3	17

at MetLife Stadium, East Rutherford, New Jersey

- Date: December 23
- Game time: 1:00 p.m. EST
- Game weather: 39 °F (4 °C), sunny
- Game attendance: 79,088
- Referee: Pete Morelli
- TV announcers (CBS): Marv Albert and Rich Gannon

Game information

First quarter

Second quarter

Third quarter

Fourth quarter

Top passers

- SD –
- NYJ –

Top rushers

- SD –
- NYJ –

Top receivers

- SD –
- NYJ –

Top tacklers

- SD –
- NYJ –

Due to a decrease in popularity for the game, it was flexed out of Sunday Night Football on NBC and rescheduled to 1:00 PM on CBS. Following the loss to the Titans Rex Ryan announced that Greg McElroy would start for the Jets against the Chargers. Following a 63-yard Micheal Spurlock punt return touchdown McElroy led back to back scoring drives ending in 1-yard Shonn Greene touchdowns. The Chargers took over the game in the third quarter with two Philip Rivers touchdowns and a Nick Novak field goal while McElroy was intercepted once and strip-sacked once.

With the loss, the Jets fell to 6–9, their first losing season since 2007.

=== Week 17: at Buffalo Bills ===
Week Seventeen: New York Jets at Buffalo Bills – Game summary

Quarter	1	2	3	4	Total
Jets	3	6	0	0	9
Bills	7	7	0	14	28

at Ralph Wilson Stadium, Orchard Park, New York

- Date: December 30
- Game time: 1:00 p.m. EST
- Game weather: 28 °F (−2 °C), mostly sunny
- Game attendance: 54,533
- Referee: Terry McAulay
- TV announcers (CBS): Marv Albert and Rich Gannon

Game information

First quarter

Second quarter

Third quarter

Fourth quarter

Top passers

- NYJ – Mark Sanchez
- BUF – Ryan Fitzpatrick

Top rushers

- NYJ – Shonn Greene
- BUF – C. J. Spiller

Top receivers

- NYJ – Jeremy Kerley
- BUF – Stevie Johnson

Top tacklers

- NYJ – Bart Scott
- BUF – Nick Barnett

The Jets' plan to start Greg McElroy was changed due to a concussion he'd suffered. As a result, Mark Sanchez started and managed 205 passing yards but was intercepted by Bryan Scott in the first quarter for the Bills' first touchdown of the game. The Jets led 9–7 in the second quarter before the Bills scored three unanswered touchdowns, including one from ex-Jet Brad Smith. Tim Tebow suited up for the game but was never used. It was the first win for the Bills in the rivalry since 2009.

== Statistics ==
=== Regular season statistical leaders ===
	Player(s)	Value
Passing yards	Mark Sanchez	2883 Yards
Passing touchdowns	Mark Sanchez	13 TDs
Rushing yards	Shonn Greene	1063 Yards
Rushing touchdowns	Shonn Greene	8 TDs
Receiving yards	Jeremy Kerley	827 Yards
Receiving touchdowns	Stephen Hill; Jeff Cumberland	3 TDs
Points	Nick Folk	93 Points
Kickoff Return Yards	Joe McKnight	1072 Yards
Punt return Yards	Jeremy Kerley	208 Yards
Tackles	David Harris	123 Tackles
Sacks	Quinton Coples	5.5 Sacks
Interceptions	Antonio Cromartie	3 INTs

=== Statistical league rankings ===
- Total Offense (YPG): 308.9 (29th)
- Passing (YPG): 194 (32nd)
- Rushing (YPG): 115.2 (12th)
- Total Defense (YPG): 336.0 (10th)
- Passing (YPG): 198 (32nd)
- Rushing (YPG): 137.7 (29th)

Stats correct through week 14.

== See also ==
- List of NFL teams affected by internal conflict
