= Donnie Fletcher =

American football player (born 1990)

Profile
- Position: Cornerback

Personal information
- Born: May 23, 1990 (age 36); Cleveland, Ohio, U.S.
- Listed height: 6 ft 1 in (1.85 m)
- Listed weight: 195 lb (88 kg)

Career information
- High school: Glenville (Cleveland, Ohio)
- College: Boston College (2008–2011)
- NFL draft: 2012: undrafted

Career history
- New York Jets (2012); Los Angeles Kiss (2014–2015); San Jose SaberCats (2015)*; Cleveland Gladiators (2015)
- * Offseason or practice squad member only

Career AFL statistics
- Total tackles: 36
- Pass deflections: 9
- Interceptions: 3
- Stats at ArenaFan.com
- Stats at Pro Football Reference

Donnie Levert Fletcher III (born May 23, 1990) is an American former football cornerback. He was signed as an undrafted free agent by the New York Jets in 2012. He played college football at Boston College.

== Early life ==
Fletcher attended Glenville High School in Cleveland, Ohio. He earned Associated Press All-Ohio second-team honors as a senior cornerback at Glenville as well as 2007 Northeast Lakes All-District first-team accolades. He registered 105 tackles and five interceptions in his senior season; also posted 12 pass deflections, two forced fumbles and two fumble recoveries for the Tarblooders. He played for head coach Ted Ginn Sr.

Considered as a three-star recruit by Rivals.com, he was ranked as the No.45 cornerback in the nation. He accepted a scholarship from Boston College over other offers from Iowa, Michigan State and West Virginia.

== College career ==
In 2008, fletcher saw action in all 14 games and started four as a true freshman. He finished the season with 36 tackles and 3 interceptions. In 2009, he played in all 13 games, including 3 starts. He recorded 51 tackles with an interception. He was the recipient of the Anne F. Schoen Memorial Scholarship that season. As a junior in 2010, he took over the starting position and started in all 13 games.

He recorded 58 tackles, and led the team with 5 interceptions. In his senior season in 2011, he started in 10 games, missing two due to an injury. He recorded 35 tackles including two interceptions.

== Professional career ==
=== 2012 NFL draft ===
Pre-draft measurables
Height	Weight	40-yard dash	10-yard split	20-yard split	20-yard shuttle	Three-cone drill	Vertical jump	Broad jump	Bench press
6 ft 1 in (1.85 m)	199 lb (90 kg)	4.51 s	1.59 s	2.57 s	4.40 s	6.99 s	32 in (0.81 m)	9 ft 11 in (3.02 m)	17 reps
All values from Pro Day.

=== New York Jets ===
Fletcher was signed by the New York Jets as an undrafted free agent on April 29, 2012. Fletcher was waived on August 31, 2012. A day later, Fletcher was signed to the team's practice squad. Fletcher was promoted to the active roster on September 22, 2012 after the team released veteran linebacker Bryan Thomas. Fletcher was waived on September 24, 2012. He was re-signed to the practice squad a day later. Fletcher was released from the squad on October 2, 2012. Fletcher was re-signed to the practice squad on October 17, 2012. Fletcher was promoted to the active roster on November 22, 2012. Fletcher was waived on December 4, 2012. He was re-signed to the practice squad two days later. Fletcher was promoted to the active roster on December 19, 2012 after Stephen Hill was placed on injured reserve. He was released on August 26, 2013.

=== Los Angeles KISS ===
Fletcher was assigned to the Los Angeles KISS on June 26, 2014.

=== San Jose SaberCats ===
On March 18, 2015, Fletcher was assigned to the San Jose SaberCats. The SaberCats placed him on recallable reassignment on March 23, 2015.

=== Cleveland Gladiators ===
On April 22, 2015, Fletcher was assigned to the Cleveland Gladiators. On July 29, 2015, Fletcher was placed on reassignment. On July 31, 2015, Fletcher was placed on injured reserve.
