= Antonio Allen =

American football player (born 1988)

No. 20, 39
- Position: Safety

Personal information
- Born: September 23, 1988 (age 38); Ocala, Florida, U.S.
- Listed height: 6 ft 1 in (1.85 m)
- Listed weight: 210 lb (95 kg)

Career information
- High school: Trinity Catholic (Ocala)
- College: South Carolina
- NFL draft: 2012: 7th round, 242nd overall pick

Career history
- New York Jets (2012–2015); Houston Texans (2016)*; New York Jets (2016)
- * Offseason or practice squad member only

Awards and highlights
- Second-team All-American (2011); Second-team All-SEC (2011)

Career NFL statistics
- Total tackles: 115
- Sacks: 2.5
- Forced fumbles: 1
- Fumble recoveries: 1
- Interceptions: 1
- Defensive touchdowns: 1
- Stats at Pro Football Reference

Antonio Allen (born September 23, 1988) is an American former professional football player who was a safety in the National Football League (NFL). He played college football for the South Carolina Gamecocks. Allen was selected by the New York Jets in the seventh round of the 2012 NFL draft.

== Early life ==
Allen attended Trinity Catholic High School in Ocala, Florida. Allen earned first-team all-state honors after his senior season at Trinity Catholic.

College recruiting
| Name | Hometown | School | Height | Weight | 40^{‡} | Commit date |
|---|---|---|---|---|---|---|
| Antonio Allen; Safety | Ocala, Florida | Trinity Catholic High School | 6 ft 1 in (1.85 m) | 177 lb (80 kg) | Unknown | Jan 17, 2007 |
| Antonio Allen; Safety | Recruit ratings: Scout: Rivals: | | | | | |
Overall recruit ranking: Scout: -- (S) Rivals: 42 (Safety), 80 (FL)
Note: In many cases, Scout, Rivals, 247Sports, On3, and ESPN may conflict in their listings of height and weight.; In these cases, the average was taken. ESPN grades are on a 100-point scale.; Sources: "South Carolina Football Commitments". Rivals.; "2008 South Carolina Football Commits". Scout.; "Scout.com Team Recruiting Rankings". Scout.; "2008 Team Ranking". Rivals.com.

== College career ==
Allen the University of South Carolina from 2008 to 2011. He played linebacker his first two years before switching to safety. He finished his career with 198 tackles, 3.5 sacks, four interceptions and two touchdowns.

== Professional career ==
=== Pre-draft ===
Allen was considered one of the top safety prospects heading into the 2012 NFL draft.

Pre-draft measurables
| Height | Weight | 40-yard dash | 10-yard split | 20-yard split | 20-yard shuttle | Three-cone drill | Vertical jump | Broad jump | Bench press |
|---|---|---|---|---|---|---|---|---|---|
| 6 ft 2 in (1.88 m) | 210 lb (95 kg) | 4.58 s | 1.61 s | 2.56 s | 4.25 s | 7.02 s | 34 in (0.86 m) | 9 ft 10 in (3.00 m) | 17 reps |
10 and 20 yard splits taken from Pro Day. All other values from NFL Combine.

=== New York Jets (first stint) ===
The New York Jets chose Allen in the seventh round of the 2012 NFL draft with the 242nd overall pick. Allen came to an agreement with the team on a four-year contract that included a $45,896 signing bonus. Allen was waived on September 1, 2012. He was re-signed to the team's practice squad a day later. Allen was promoted to the active roster on October 12, 2012, after the team placed Darrelle Revis on injured reserve. On November 6, 2012, he was waived after the team re-signed Jason Hill. He was signed to the practice squad two days later after clearing waivers. Allen was promoted to the active roster on December 6, 2012.

Allen entered the 2013 preseason competing with newly signed Jaiquawn Jarrett for the starting free safety job. Allen finished the 2013 season with 60 tackles, a sack, and an interception for a touchdown.

Allen was waived by the Jets on August 7, 2015, after suffering an Achilles tendon injury. After clearing waivers, he was placed on injured reserve on August 10, 2015.

=== Houston Texans ===
Allen signed with the Houston Texans on March 16, 2016. On September 3, 2016, he was released by the Texans.

=== New York Jets (second stint) ===
On September 6, 2016, Allen re-signed with the Jets. He was waived/injured on December 10, 2016, and placed on injured reserve.

== NFL career statistics ==
Legend
| **Bold** | Career high |

| Year | Team | Games | | Tackles | | | | | Interceptions | | | | | Fumbles | | | |
| Year | Team | GP | GS | Cmb | Solo | Ast | Sck | TFL | Int | Yds | TD | Lng | PD | FF | FR | Yds | TD |
|---|---|---|---|---|---|---|---|---|---|---|---|---|---|---|---|---|---|
| 2012 | NYJ | 7 | 1 | 6 | 4 | 2 | **1.0** | 1 | 0 | 0 | 0 | 0 | 0 | 0 | **1** | 0 | 0 |
| 2013 | NYJ | **16** | **9** | **63** | **42** | **21** | **1.0** | **2** | **1** | **23** | **1** | **23** | **7** | 0 | 0 | 0 | 0 |
| 2014 | NYJ | 15 | 8 | 41 | 36 | 5 | 0.5 | 1 | 0 | 0 | 0 | 0 | 6 | **1** | 0 | 0 | 0 |
| 2016 | NYJ | 12 | 0 | 5 | 3 | 2 | 0.0 | 0 | 0 | 0 | 0 | 0 | 0 | 0 | 0 | 0 | 0 |
| | | 50 | 18 | 115 | 85 | 30 | 2.5 | 4 | 1 | 23 | 1 | 23 | 13 | 1 | 1 | 0 | 0 |
