= Brian Linthicum =

American football player (born 1987)

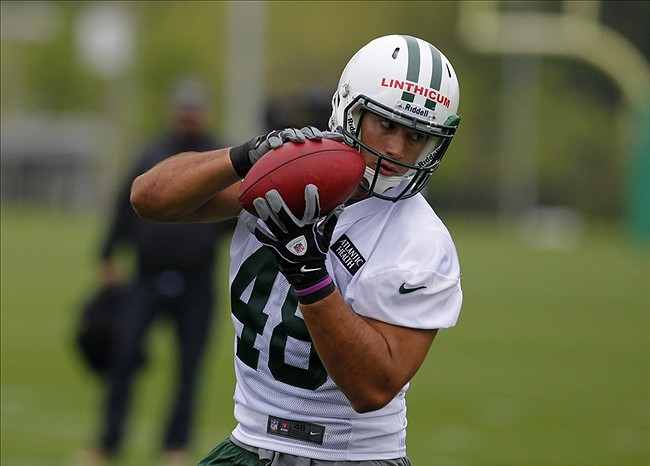

No. 48
- Position: Tight end

Personal information
- Born: November 28, 1987 (age 38); St. Louis, Missouri, U.S.
- Listed height: 6 ft 5 in (1.96 m)
- Listed weight: 245 lb (111 kg)

Career information
- High school: St. Anne's-Belfield (Charlottesville, Virginia)
- College: Clemson; Michigan State
- NFL draft: 2012: undrafted

Career history
- New York Jets (2012)*
- * Offseason or practice squad member only

Awards and highlights
- Second-team All-Big Ten (2011)

Brian Linthicum (born November 28, 1987) is an American former college football player who was a tight end for the Michigan State Spartans. He was signed as an undrafted free agent by the New York Jets of the National Football League (NFL) in 2012.

== Early life ==
He attended St. Anne's-Belfield School in Charlottesville, Virginia. He earned first-team all-state in his senior season. According to Rivals.com, he was ranked 29th among the nation's top tight ends.

College recruiting
Name	Hometown	School	Height	Weight	40^{‡}	Commit date
Brian Linthicum; Tight end	Charlottesville, Virginia	St. Anne's-Belfield High School	6 ft 4 in (1.93 m)	217 lb (98 kg)	4.72	Dec 6, 2006
Brian Linthicum; Tight end	Recruit ratings: Scout: Rivals:					
Overall recruit ranking: Scout: 33 (TE) Rivals: 29 (TE), 13 (V)
‡ Refers to 40-yard dash; Note: In many cases, Scout, Rivals, 247Sports, On3, and ESPN may conflict in their listings of height, weight and 40 time.; In these cases, the average was taken. ESPN grades are on a 100-point scale.; Sources: "Clemson Football Commitments". Rivals.; "2007 Clemson Football Recruiting Commits". Scout.; "Scout.com Team Recruiting Rankings". Scout.; "2007 Team Ranking". Rivals.com.

== College career ==
He spent his freshman year at Clemson then he transferred to Michigan State before his sophomore season. He played three seasons at Michigan State. In his three years in Michigan State and one year in Clemson, he had 80 receptions, 936 receiving yards and 6 receiving touchdowns.

In his senior year, he was named to the Second-team All-Big Ten. He finished the year with a career high 31 receptions, career high 364 receiving yards but no touchdowns. On September 2, 2011, he recorded 2 receptions for 11 yards against Youngstown State as Michigan State wins 28-6. On September 17, 2011, he had just one reception for 8 yards against Notre Dame but Michigan State loss 31-13. On October 15, 2011, he recorded 2 receptions for 22 yards against 11 ranked Michigan as Michigan State wins 28-14.

In his junior year, he finished the year with 18 receptions, 230 receiving yards and a touchdown. On September 25, 2010, he recorded 3 receptions for 63 yards and a touchdown against Northern Colorado helping Michigan State win 45-7.

In his sophomore year, he was selected to the Academic All-Big Ten. He finished the year with 20 receptions, 266 receiving yards and 2 receiving touchdowns. On September 5, 2009, he recorded 3 receptions for 26 yards and a touchdown against Montana State as Michigan State wins 44-3.

He missed the 2008 season due to transferring from Clemson to Michigan State.

In his freshman year at (Clemson), he finished the year with 11 receptions, 76 receiving yards and 3 receiving touchdowns. On September 3, 2007, he had one reception for 11 yards and a Touchdown against 19th ranked Florida State as Clemson wins 24-18. On September 8, 2007, he recorded 2 receptions for 23 yards and a touchdown against Louisiana-Monroe as Clemson wins 49-26. On November 3, 2007, he had a 2-yard receiving touchdown with 6:49 minutes left in 4th quarter against Duke 47-10 and by that same score, Clemson wins 47-10.

== Professional career ==
=== New York Jets ===
On April 28, 2012, Linthicum signed with the New York Jets as an undrafted free agent. He was waived on July 3, 2012 after suffering a quadriceps injury that rendered him unable to practice at the Jets' mini-camp.

== Personal life ==
Linthicum's parents are Don and Carla Linthicum. His brother, Josh, earned four letters as a center on the Bucknell Bison men's basketball team.
