= Marcus Dowtin =

American gridiron football player (born 1989)

No. 92, 54, 53, 38
- Position: Linebacker

Personal information
- Born: January 22, 1989 (age 37); Hyattsville, Maryland, U.S.
- Listed height: 6 ft 2 in (1.88 m)
- Listed weight: 230 lb (104 kg)

Career information
- High school: Fork Union Military Academy (Fork Union, Virginia)
- College: North Alabama
- NFL draft: 2012: undrafted

Career history
- New York Jets (2012); Philadelphia Eagles (2012–2013)*; Buffalo Bills (2013); New York Giants (2013); Seattle Seahawks (2014)*; Toronto Argonauts (2014)
- * Offseason or practice squad member only

Career NFL statistics
- Total tackles: 10
- Stats at Pro Football Reference

Marcus Dowtin (born January 22, 1989) is an American former professional football linebacker. Dowtin was signed by the New York Jets as an undrafted free agent in 2012. Dowtin played college football at Georgia before transferring to North Alabama during his senior year.

Dowtin was also a member of the Philadelphia Eagles, Buffalo Bills, New York Giants, Seattle Seahawks, and Toronto Argonauts.

== Early life ==
Dowtin attended Bishop McNamara High School in Maryland, and later Fork Union Military Academy High School. Dowtin was selected to the 2008 SuperPrep All-Mid-Atlantic team and Atlanta Journal-Constitution Super Southern 100. He was selected to the PrepStar All-Atlantic Region. He recorded 76 tackles, two sacks, three fumble recoveries and one interception in his senior season in 2007. He also had 1,202 rushing yards and 15 rushing touchdowns in high school as a running back. He was ranked 10th on State of Virginia Top 30 list and was ranked as the 7th best weakside linebacker in the nation by Scout.com.

College recruiting
Name	Hometown	School	Height	Weight	40^{‡}	Commit date
Marcus Dowtin; Outside linebacker	Hyattsville, Maryland	Fork Union Military Academy	6 ft 2 in (1.88 m)	215 lb (98 kg)	4.4	Nov 9, 2007
Marcus Dowtin; Outside linebacker	Recruit ratings: Scout: Rivals:					
Overall recruit ranking: Scout: 7 (RB) Rivals: 16, 140 (OLB), 6 (AL)
‡ Refers to 40-yard dash; Note: In many cases, Scout, Rivals, 247Sports, On3, and ESPN may conflict in their listings of height, weight and 40 time.; In these cases, the average was taken. ESPN grades are on a 100-point scale.; Sources: "Georgia Football Commitments". Rivals.; "2008 Georgia Football Recruiting Commits". Scout.; "Scout.com Team Recruiting Rankings". Scout.; "2008 Team Ranking". Rivals.com.

== College career ==
Dowtin played college football at the University of Georgia until he transferred to the University of North Alabama for his senior season. On January 3, 2011, Dowtin was charged with second degree assault for his involvement in an altercation at a Maryland bar on May 29, 2010. On January 11, 2011, he was given an unconditional release by the University of Georgia.

In his freshman year, Dowtin played in 13 games in which he recorded 17 tackles and a forced fumble.

In his sophomore year, he played in 11 games and started 4 of them in which he recorded 57 tackles and 2 sacks. On September 5, 2009, in the season opener against Oklahoma State, Dowtin recorded 8 tackles but Georgia lost the game 24-10. On September 12, in a game against South Carolina, he recorded 6 tackles helping Georgia win 41-37. On September 19, he recorded 3 tackles and a pass deflection against Arkansas as Georgia won the game 52-41. In 2009, he was selected for the Col. Robert L. Jackson Family Scholarship.

In his junior year, Dowtin played in 11 games and started 2 games in which he recorded 57 tackles, 1.5 sacks and an interception for the season. He was a recipient of the Robert P. "Yunk" Ludwig Football Scholarship. On September 4, 2010, in a regular season game against Louisiana-Lafayette, Dowtin recorded 4 tackles as Georgia won by the score of 55-7. On September 11, he recorded 4 tackles against No. 24 ranked South Carolina but Georgia lost the game 17-6. On October 2, in a game against Colorado, Dowtin recorded 4 tackles, one sack and an interception but Georgia lost the game 29-27. On October 9, he recorded 3 tackles and 0.5 sack against Tennessee as Georgia won 41-14. On October 30, he had 10 tackles against Florida but the Georgia lost in overtime 34-31. On November 13, in a regular season game against No. 2 ranked Auburn, he recorded 10 tackles but Georgia lost 49-31.

In his senior year, he played at North Alabama. On September 1, he had 9 tackles, a forced fumble and an interception against Central Oklahoma contributing to North Alabama's 31-10 win. On September 10, he had 3 tackles and a half sack against Glenville State helping North Alabama win the game 48-21. On September 17, he had a team leading 10 tackles, 2 forced fumbles, a sack, a pass deflection against Abilene Christian. On November 12, in a game against Valdosta State, he had 10 tackles, 2 sacks and a forced fumble helping North Alabama win the game 30-23. He was named Defensive Player of the Week twice (9/5/2011, November 14, 2011).

== Professional career ==
=== New York Jets ===
On April 30, 2012, Dowtin signed with the New York Jets as an undrafted free agent. On August 31, Dowtin was released on the day of final roster cuts. On September 1, Dowtin re-signed with the team to join the practice squad. On October 17, Dowtin was promoted to the active roster after the team released John Conner with an injury settlement. On October 21, he made his NFL debut against the New England Patriots. On November 2, Dowtin was fined $15,750 for unnecessary roughness on Miami Dolphins quarterback Matt Moore. On November 20, 2012, Dowtin was waived.

=== Philadelphia Eagles ===
Dowtin was signed to the Philadelphia Eagles' practice squad on December 24, 2012. He was released from his contract on April 11, 2013.

=== Buffalo Bills ===
Dowtin was claimed off waivers by the Buffalo Bills on April 12, 2013. On October 8, 2013, he was released.

=== New York Giants ===
On November 13, 2013, Dowtin was signed to the New York Giants' practice squad. On March 12, 2014, Dowtin was waived by the Giants.

=== Seattle Seahawks ===
Dowtin signed with the Seattle Seahawks on August 1, 2014. He was released on August 27, 2014.

=== Toronto Argonauts ===
On October 7, 2014, Dowtin was signed to the practice roster of the Toronto Argonauts. He played in one game during the 2014 season, posting one sack and one tackle. He was released by the Argonauts on November 11, 2014.
