= Tanner Purdum =

American football player (born 1984)

Avila Eagles
- Title: Special teams coordinator & safeties coach

Personal information
- Born: August 15, 1984 (age 42); Enid, Oklahoma, U.S.
- Listed height: 6 ft 3 in (1.91 m)
- Listed weight: 270 lb (122 kg)

Career information
- Position: Long snapper (No. 46)
- High school: Ava (Ava, Missouri)
- College: Baker
- NFL draft: 2008: undrafted

Career history

Playing
- Kansas City Chiefs (2009)*; New York Jets (2010–2016)
- * Offseason or practice squad member only

Coaching
- Avila (2026–present) Special teams coordinator & safeties coach

Career NFL statistics
- Games played: 112
- Total tackles: 10
- Stats at Pro Football Reference

Tanner Gregory Purdum (born August 15, 1984) is an American college football coach and former professional player who was a long snapper for seven seasons with the New York Jets of the National Football League (NFL). He is the special teams coordinator and safeties coach for Avila University, positions he has held since 2026. Purdum comes from Ava, Missouri. He was signed by the Kansas City Chiefs as an undrafted free agent in 2009. He played college football for the Baker Wildcats.

== Professional career ==
=== Kansas City Chiefs ===
On April 7, 2009, the Kansas City Chiefs signed Purdum with the intention of having him compete for the starting job of long snapper. On August 13, 2009, the Chiefs waived Purdum in favor of Thomas Gafford.

=== New York Jets ===
On February 5, 2010, the New York Jets signed Purdum to a three-year contract after incumbent long snapper James Dearth, who was an unrestricted free agent at the time, had a few snaps that were "off the mark" in the 2009 season. Purdum was recommended to the team by former Chiefs and Jets punter Louie Aguiar.

On March 10, 2017, Purdum signed a one-year contract extension with the Jets.

On September 2, 2017, Purdum was released by the Jets after the team traded for rookie long snapper Thomas Hennessy. At the time, Purdum was the longest-tenured player on the team, and the last remaining player on the roster who had appeared in a playoff game for the Jets.

On March 28, 2018, Purdum announced his retirement from the NFL.

== Personal life ==
Purdum is married to his wife, Kara. He received his master's degree in education from Baker in 2009. Purdum graduated from Ava High School in Ava, Missouri in 2003.
