= Ryan Steed =

American gridiron football player (born 1990)

No. 24
- Position: Cornerback

Personal information
- Born: July 21, 1990 (age 36); Charleston, South Carolina
- Listed height: 5 ft 11 in (1.80 m)
- Listed weight: 185 lb (84 kg)

Career information
- High school: Summerville (SC) Pinewood Prep
- College: Furman
- NFL draft: 2012: undrafted

Career history
- New York Jets (2012)*; New Orleans Saints (2012−2013)*; Pittsburgh Steelers (2013)*; Calgary Stampeders (2014)*; Saskatchewan Roughriders (2014)*; Winnipeg Blue Bombers (2015)*
- * Offseason or practice squad member only
- Stats at Pro Football Reference
- Stats at CFL.ca (archive)

Ryan Justin Steed (born July 21, 1990) is an American former professional football cornerback. He was signed by the New York Jets as an undrafted free agent in 2012. He played college football at Furman University.

== Early life ==
The son of Ernest Steed and Lisa King, Steed was born July 21, 1990, in Charleston, South Carolina. He attended Pinewood Preparatory School in Summerville, South Carolina, where he played both basketball and football. His basketball team achieved three SCISA AAA state championships. In football, where he played multiple positions, Steed was distinguished in his senior year by the Charleston Post and Courier as "all-region" for their All-Lowcountry Football second-team. In the North Carolina-South Carolina Shrine All-Star Classic game, Steed was dubbed "Defensive Player of the Game".

== Collegiate career ==
Steed played college football for Furman University. In 2011, he was named 1st team FCS All-American by the Associated Press and the American Football Coaches Association. He was also selected to play in the 2012 Senior Bowl. He earned 1st team All-Southern Conference as a sophomore, junior and senior.

== Professional career ==
=== New York Jets ===
Steed was signed as an undrafted free agent by the New York Jets on April 29, 2012. He was waived on August 29, 2012.

=== New Orleans Saints ===
Steed was signed to the New Orleans Saints' practice squad on December 19, 2012.

On July 23, 2013, Steed was waived by the New Orleans Saints.

=== Pittsburgh Steelers ===
On July 30, 2013, Steed was signed by the Pittsburgh Steelers as a free agent. On August 25, 2013, he was cut by the Steelers.

=== Calgary Stampeders ===
Steed was signed by the Stampeders on March 25, 2014, and released on July 11, 2014.

=== Saskatchewan Roughriders ===
Steed signed with the Saskatchewan Roughriders in October 2014.
