= Raymond Webber =

American gridiron football player (born 1989)

No. 12
- Position: Wide receiver

Personal information
- Born: June 1, 1989 (age 37); Saint Louis, Missouri, U.S.
- Listed height: 6 ft 3 in (1.91 m)
- Listed weight: 225 lb (102 kg)

Career information
- High school: St. Louis (MO) Clyde C. Miller
- College: Arkansas-Pine Bluff
- NFL draft: 2011: undrafted

Career history
- Tampa Bay Buccaneers (2011); Seattle Seahawks (2012)*; New York Jets (2012)*; Sacramento Mountain Lions (2012); Arizona Rattlers (2013–2014)*; Calgary Stampeders (2013)*; Green Bay Packers (2014)*; Miami Dolphins (2014)*; Arizona Rattlers (2015)*
- * Offseason or practice squad member only
- Stats at Pro Football Reference

Raymond Lamarr Webber (born June 1, 1989) is an American former football wide receiver. He was signed by the Tampa Bay Buccaneers as an undrafted free agent in 2011. He played college football for the University of Arkansas at Pine Bluff.

== Early life ==
Webber was born in Saint Louis, Missouri. He attended Cleveland NJROTC High School located in South Saint Louis, Missouri. Webber transferred to Clyde C. Miller Career Academy his sophomore year. Due to the transfer, Webber was not allowed to play any sports his first year at Clyde C. Miller. Webber excelled at three sports while attending Miller Career Academy, basketball, football, and track.

== College career ==
Webber attended the University of Arkansas-Pine Bluff where he majored in business marketing. He was a four-year letterman in football. He was UAPB's record holder for receptions in a game, and currently is in yards in a game, receptions in a single season and yards in a single season. Receptions in a career and Yards in a Career. Webber ended his senior season becoming the second player in Southwest Athletic Conference history to ever record 100 receptions in a single season (101) the only other was Jerry Rice (103).

While at Pine Bluff, he joined Alpha Phi Alpha fraternity.

== Professional career ==
=== Tampa Bay Buccaneers ===
Webber signed with the Tampa Bay Buccaneers as an undrafted free agent in July 2011. He was sidelined with a hamstring injury and put on the injured reserve list on August 15, 2011.

=== New York Jets ===
Webber was signed by the New York Jets on June 19, 2012. He was waived on August 25, 2012.

=== Arizona Rattlers ===
Webber signed with the Arizona Rattlers of the Arena Football League for the 2013 season. Before the season began, Webber was placed on the other league exempt list when he signed with the Calgary Stampeders. Webber was activated on July 11, 2013, but refused to report to the Rattlers.

=== Calgary Stampeders ===
Webber signed with the Calgary Stampeders, of the Canadian Football League, during their 2013 training camp. Webber was cut on June 11, 2013.
