= Paul Cornick =

American football player (born 1989)

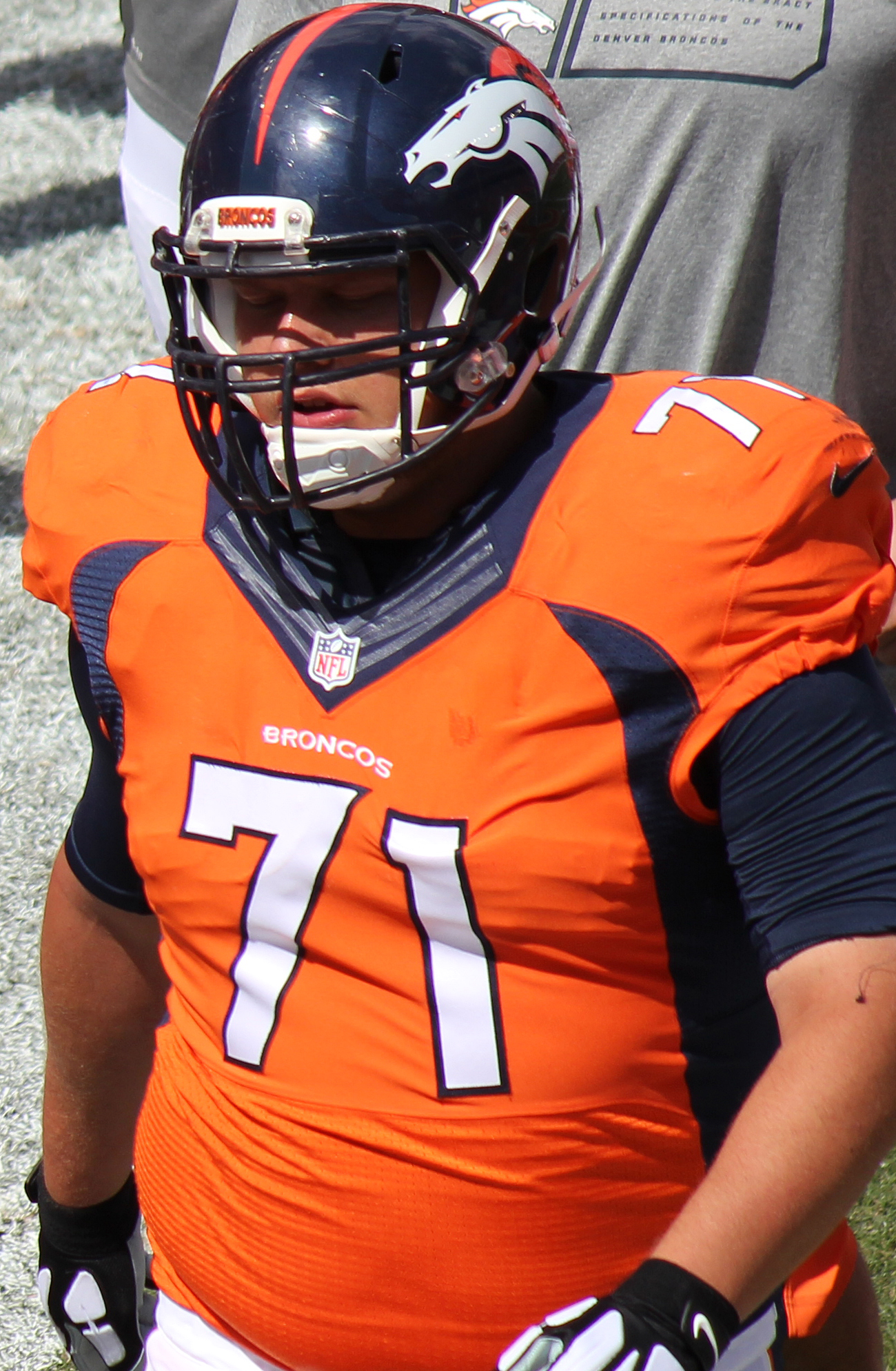
- Cornick with the Denver Broncos in 2014

No. 71
- Position: Offensive tackle

Personal information
- Born: March 15, 1989 (age 37); Maple Plain, Minnesota, U.S.
- Listed height: 6 ft 6 in (1.98 m)
- Listed weight: 310 lb (141 kg)

Career information
- High school: Orono (Orono, Minnesota)
- College: North Dakota State
- NFL draft: 2012: undrafted

Career history
- New York Jets (2012)*; Denver Broncos (2012–2014); Chicago Bears (2015)*
- * Offseason or practice squad member only

Awards and highlights
- NCAA Division I FCS national champion (2011); First-team FCS All-American (2011); First-team All-MVFC (2011)

Career NFL statistics
- Games played: 12
- Games started: 6
- Stats at Pro Football Reference

Paul Cornick (born March 15, 1989) is an American former professional football player who was an offensive tackle for the Denver Broncos of the National Football League (NFL). He played college football for the North Dakota State Bison.

== Early life ==
Cornick participated in football and track and field at Orono High School in Orono, Minnesota. He was an Associated Press (AP) honorable mention all-state selection in 2006 and a Star Tribune third-team all-metro team selection.

== College career ==
Cornick played for the Bison at North Dakota State University from 2008 to 2011. He was redshirted in 2007. He earned first-team All-Missouri Valley Football Conference and AP first-team FCS All-American honors his senior year in 2011.

== Professional career ==
Cornick was rated the 47th best offensive tackle in the 2012 NFL draft. He signed with the New York Jets on July 12, 2012, after going undrafted. He was released by the Jets on August 31, 2012.

Cornick was signed to the Denver Broncos' practice squad on December 10, 2012. He was released by the Broncos on August 31, 2013. He was signed the Broncos' practice squad on September 4, 2013. Cornick was signed to a futures deal by the Broncos on February 4, 2014. He made his NFL debut on September 7, 2014, against the Indianapolis Colts. He was released by the Broncos on May 4, 2015.

Cornick was claimed off waivers by the Chicago Bears on May 5, 2015. He was waived just two days later on May 7, 2015, due to a failed physical.

== Personal life ==
Cornick received a Juris Doctor from the University of St. Thomas School of Law in Minneapolis, Minnesota in May 2025.
