= Josh Baker =

American football player (born 1986)

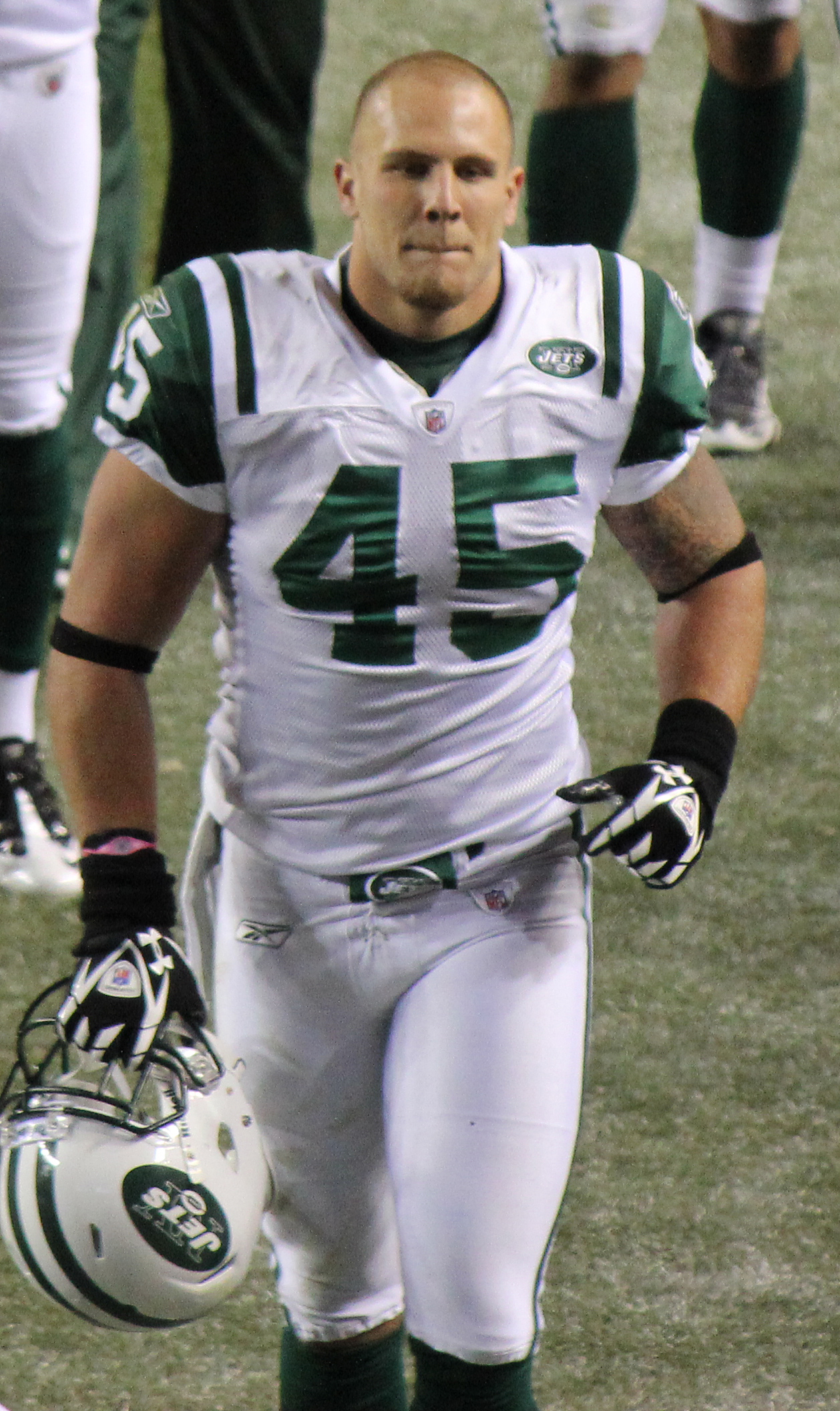
- Baker with the Jets in 2011

No. 45
- Position: Tight end

Personal information
- Born: December 25, 1986 (age 39); Chesapeake, Virginia, U.S.
- Listed height: 6 ft 3 in (1.91 m)
- Listed weight: 244 lb (111 kg)

Career information
- High school: Western Branch (Chesapeake)
- College: Northwest Missouri State
- NFL draft: 2011: undrafted

Career history
- New York Jets (2011–2012); Tampa Bay Buccaneers (2014)*
- * Offseason or practice squad member only

Career NFL statistics
- Receptions: 3
- Receiving yards: 27
- Receiving touchdowns: 1
- Stats at Pro Football Reference

Joshua Stevenson Baker (born December 25, 1986) is an American former professional football player who was a tight end in the National Football League (NFL). He played college football for the Delaware Fightin' Blue Hens and Northwest Missouri Bearcats. He played high school football at Western Branch High School.

== College career ==
Baker began his college career at the University of Delaware in 2005. Although among the team's top scout team players, Baker did not participate in a formal match-up that year. In 2006, he was named the Blue Hens' third string tight end appearing in ten games in a back-up role primarily on running plays and special teams. Baker recorded one catch for no yards and had a 14-yard kickoff return. In 2007, Baker was named the second string tight end and ranked sixth on the team in receiving, totaling 20 catches for 344 yards and 2 touchdowns. In 2008, Baker was suspended from the team for a year after violating the school's three strike policy which included incidents such as underage drinking and having a lit candle in his dorm room.

Baker went to live with his father in Waco, Texas, where he attended Collin County Community College and worked at an OfficeMax earning $9.00 an hour, which went toward his community college fees. He also worked with a professional trainer to stay in shape. Delaware retained Baker's athletic scholarship and he returned for his redshirt senior season in 2009. Baker tore multiple knee ligaments in the first quarter of the Blue Hens' first game of the year, ending his season.

Baker was denied a medical redshirt and transferred to Division II Northwest Missouri State University. Baker had 66 catches for 838 yards and a touchdown, and 3 rushing touchdowns for Missouri in 2010 and was named to the Associated Press' Little All-America Team.

== Professional career ==
Pre-draft measurables
Height	Weight	40-yard dash	10-yard split	20-yard split	20-yard shuttle	Three-cone drill	Vertical jump	Broad jump	Bench press
6 ft 2 1/8 in (1.88 m)	244 lb (111 kg)	4.72 s	1.65 s	2.79 s	4.41 s	6.90 s	37.0 in (0.94 m)	9 ft 9 in (2.97 m)	25 reps
All values from Pro Day

=== New York Jets ===
The New York Jets signed Baker as an undrafted free agent on July 27, 2011. To meet the roster requirement, Baker was waived by the Jets on September 3. He was signed to the team's practice squad a day later. Baker was called up to the active roster on September 27, 2011, following a season-ending injury to tight end Jeff Cumberland. On December 24, 2011, he caught his first career touchdown against the New York Giants. In 11 games of 2011, Baker made 3 receptions for 27 yards and a touchdown. He also returned 3 punts for 60 return yards.

Baker suffered a severe knee injury on August 26, 2012 and was placed on the team's injured reserve list the following day. He was waived by the Jets on February 19, 2013.

=== Tampa Bay Buccaneers ===
Baker signed with the Tampa Bay Buccaneers on April 1, 2014. He was waived by the Bucs on May 12, 2014.
