= Robert Griffin (offensive lineman) =

American football player (born 1989)

No. 52, 55
- Position: Offensive guard

Personal information
- Born: November 22, 1989 (age 36); Euless, Texas, U.S.
- Listed height: 6 ft 6 in (1.98 m)
- Listed weight: 330 lb (150 kg)

Career information
- High school: Trinity (Euless)
- College: Baylor
- NFL draft: 2012: 6th round, 203rd overall pick

Career history
- New York Jets (2012)*; Indianapolis Colts (2012−2013)*; Mesquite / Dallas Marshals (2016–2017); Texas Revolution (2017)
- * Offseason or practice squad member only

Awards and highlights
- CIF champion (2017); Second-team CIF Southern Conference (2017); Second-team All-Big 12 (2011)
- Stats at Pro Football Reference

Robert Torrez Griffin (born November 22, 1989) is an American former football offensive guard. He was selected by the New York Jets in the sixth round, 203rd overall, in the 2012 NFL draft. He played college football at Baylor University.

== College career ==
Griffin attended Navarro College immediately after graduating from high school, before transferring to Baylor in 2010. When he arrived the more famous Robert Griffin III was already on the roster. Sharing the same name as the quarterback brought Griffin some notoriety before the draft.

== Professional career ==
Pre-draft measurables
Height	Weight	40-yard dash	10-yard split	20-yard split	20-yard shuttle	Three-cone drill	Vertical jump	Broad jump	Bench press
6 ft 6 in (1.98 m)	366 lb (166 kg)	5.54 s	1.91 s	3.18 s	4.94 s	8.03 s	29 in (0.74 m)	8 ft 4 in (2.54 m)	14 reps
All values from Pro Day

The New York Jets drafted Griffin using their sixth round selection in the 2012 NFL draft. Griffin signed a four-year contract on May 15, 2012. On August 31, 2012, Griffin was waived.

Griffin was signed to the Indianapolis Colts' practice squad on December 12, 2012. He was released on December 18, 2012. Griffin was signed to a reserve/future contract on January 1, 2013. Griffin was waived by the Colts on August 1, 2013.
