= Ricky Sapp =

American football player (born 1986)

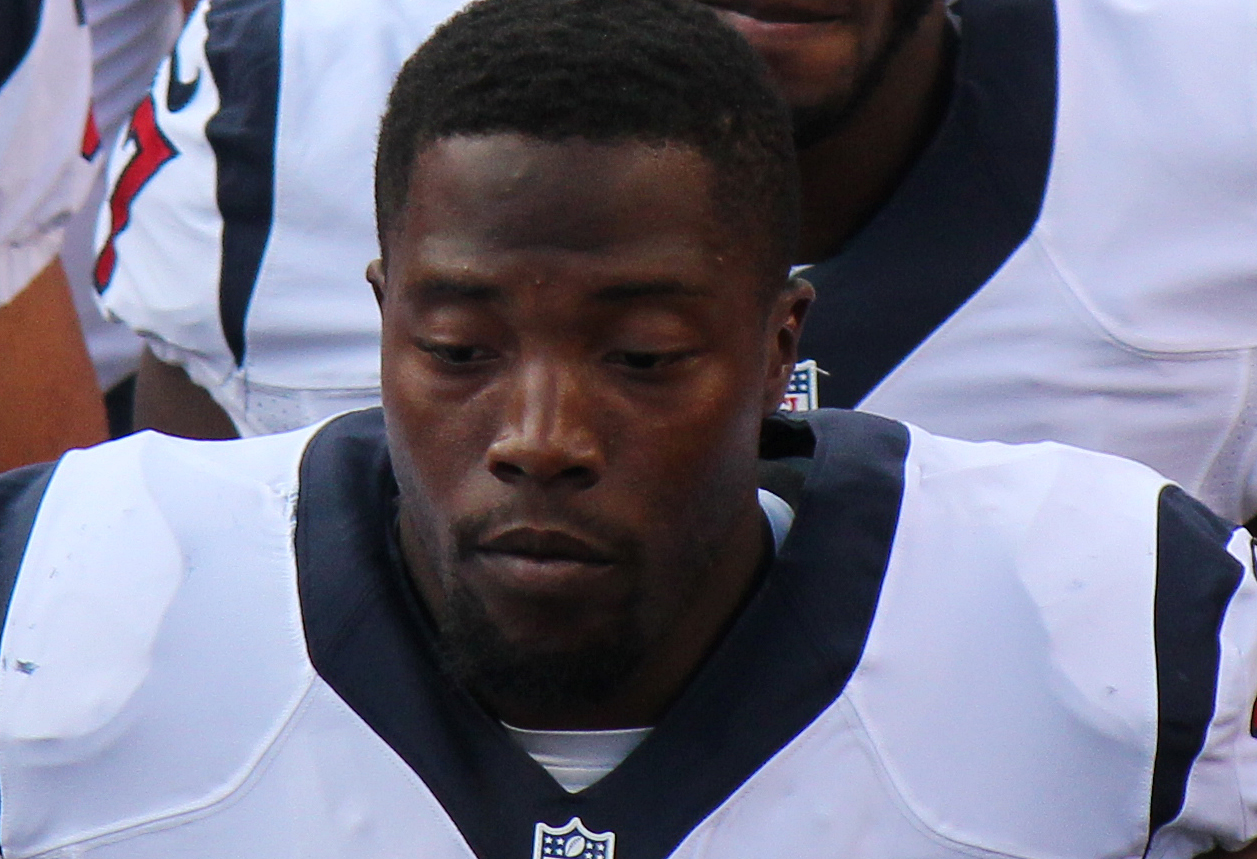
- Sapp with the Houston Texans in 2014

No. 94, 55, 91
- Position: Linebacker

Personal information
- Born: November 14, 1986 (age 40); Columbia, South Carolina, U.S.
- Listed height: 6 ft 4 in (1.93 m)
- Listed weight: 252 lb (114 kg)

Career information
- High school: Bamberg-Ehrhardt (Bamberg, South Carolina)
- College: Clemson
- NFL draft: 2010: 5th round, 134th overall pick

Career history
- Philadelphia Eagles (2010); New York Jets (2011–2013); Houston Texans (2013–2014); Washington Redskins (2015)*
- * Offseason or practice squad member only

Awards and highlights
- Second-team All-ACC (2009)

Career NFL statistics
- Total tackles: 6
- Fumble recoveries: 1
- Stats at Pro Football Reference

Ricky Sapp (born November 14, 1986) is an American former professional football player who was a linebacker in the National Football League (NFL). He was selected by the Philadelphia Eagles in the fifth round of the 2010 NFL draft. He played college football for the Clemson Tigers.

== Early life ==
Sapp attended Bamberg-Ehrhardt High School in Bamberg, South Carolina, where he was all-region as a sophomore and all-state as a junior after recording 70 tackles, 27 tackles for loss, and 11 quarterback sacks. In his senior season, he had 82 tackles, 25 tackles for loss, and 11 sacks, earning him All-American honors by USA Today.

Considered a five-star recruit by Rivals.com, Sapp was listed as the No. 1 weakside defensive end prospect in the nation. He chose Clemson over Florida State, Georgia, N.C. State, Oklahoma, South Carolina, and Virginia Tech. Sapp was Clemson's first All-American defensive lineman commit since 1989.

== College career ==
In his initial year at Clemson, Sapp appeared on defense in all 13 games as a true freshman. Despite playing behind All-American Gaines Adams, Sapp had 20 tackles and six tackles for loss on the year and ranked second on the team in sacks (4). He earned a freshman All-American honorable mention by Scout.com.

As a sophomore, Sapp played all 13 games and had 52 tackles, second-most among defensive linemen. He also had 10 tackles for loss, five sacks, and 22 quarterback pressures. In his junior year, Sapp had 10 tackles for loss in just 347 snaps. He entered his senior year fourth among active ACC players in career tackles for loss (26) and fourth among active players in career sacks (11).

== Professional career ==
=== Philadelphia Eagles ===
Sapp was selected by the Philadelphia Eagles in the fifth round (134th overall) in the 2010 NFL draft. He was signed to a four-year contract on June 8, 2010. He was placed on injured reserve on August 31 after suffering a knee injury. Sapp underwent arthroscopic knee surgery in September.

Sapp was placed on the exempt/left squad list on August 4, 2011, after leaving the team for undisclosed reasons. He was waived on August 5.

=== New York Jets ===
Sapp was signed to the New York Jets' practice squad on October 31, 2011. He was released on November 21. Sapp was re-signed to the practice squad on November 28. Sapp was promoted to the team's active roster on December 29. Sapp was waived August 31, 2012.

Sapp was signed to the team's practice squad on September 1, 2012. He was released on September 5. Sapp was re-signed to the practice squad on September 11. On November 8, 2012, he was promoted to the active roster from the practice squad. Sapp was released on October 5, 2013. He was re-signed on October 9, 2013. Sapp was released on November 14, 2013, to make room for Ed Reed.

=== Houston Texans ===
Sapp was claimed off waivers by the Houston Texans on November 15, 2013. Sapp was signed to the Houston Texans active roster September 16, 2014.

=== Washington Redskins ===
Sapp signed a futures contract with the Washington Redskins on January 8, 2015. He was waived by the Redskins on May 4, 2015.
