= Stephon Heyer =

American football player (born 1984)

No. 74, 75
- Position: Offensive tackle

Personal information
- Born: January 16, 1984 (age 42); Lawrenceville, Georgia, U.S.
- Listed height: 6 ft 7 in (2.01 m)
- Listed weight: 350 lb (159 kg)

Career information
- High school: Snellville (GA) Brookwood
- College: Maryland
- NFL draft: 2007: undrafted

Career history
- Washington Redskins (2007–2010); Oakland Raiders (2011); New York Jets (2012)*; BC Lions (2014)
- * Offseason or practice squad member only

Career NFL statistics
- Games played: 61
- Games started: 35
- Fumble recoveries: 2
- Stats at Pro Football Reference

Stephon Heyer (born January 16, 1984) is an American former professional football player who was an offensive tackle in the National Football League (NFL). He was signed by the Washington Redskins as an undrafted free agent in 2007. He played college football for the Maryland Terrapins.

He was also a member of the Oakland Raiders, New York Jets and BC Lions.

== Early life ==
Heyer attended Brookwood High School in Snellville, Georgia and was a student and a two-year letterman in football.

== College career ==
During his time at Maryland Heyer appeared in 50 games, with 37 starts at left tackle. He ended his college career by being selected and playing in the 2007 Hula Bowl. He earned honorable mention honors in 2006 as an All-ACC Lineman. After playing in the Champs Sports Bowl, Heyer was selected to the ESPN.com's All-Bowl team for his excellent play. In 2004, he started in all 11 games at left tackle and ended the year being the terps highest rated lineman. In 2003, he started in all 13 games at left tackle, finished the season as the team's second highest rated lineman, and had only two penalties the entire season. In 2002, as a freshman, Heyer played in all 13 games, but started only one, and had only two penalties for the entire season.

== Professional career ==
=== Washington Redskins ===
Heyer was signed by the Washington Redskins in 2007 as an undrafted free agent. Heyer became a full-time starter for the Redskins in 2009.

=== Oakland Raiders ===
On August 2, 2011, Heyer signed with the Oakland Raiders.

=== New York Jets ===
Heyer was signed by the New York Jets on May 29, 2012. He was released on August 20, 2012.

=== BC Lions ===
Heyer signed with the BC Lions on April 23, 2014.

== Personal life ==
Heyer is the son of Ronald and Glenda Heyer. He was recruited by numerous division one colleges out of high school including: Michigan, Georgia, Arkansas, Clemson, Florida, Alabama, Ohio State, Kentucky, Vanderbilt, and Auburn. He graduated with a degree in criminology and criminal justice in 2006.
