= Neil Glat =

American businessman and sports executive

- Born: Neil Glat; September 29, 1967 (age 59); United States of America
- Education: Wharton School of Business (BS); Harvard Law School (JD)
- Occupations: Businessman and sports executive
- Known for: Former president of the New York Jets

Neil Douglas Glat (born September 29, 1967) is an American businessman and sports executive who is a senior advisor for the New York Jets of the National Football League (NFL). He graduated from Wharton School of Business and Harvard Law School.

On August 30, 2019, Glat stepped down as team president of the New York Jets and would transition into a senior advisor role.
