= Royce Pollard (American football) =

American gridiron football player (born 1989)

Profile
- Position: Wide receiver

Personal information
- Born: June 3, 1989 (age 37); Honolulu, Hawaii, U.S.
- Listed height: 6 ft 1 in (1.85 m)
- Listed weight: 175 lb (79 kg)

Career information
- High school: San Diego (CA) University City
- College: Hawaiʻi
- NFL draft: 2012: undrafted

Career history
- New York Jets (2012–2013)*; Cleveland Gladiators (2014); Los Angeles KISS (2015)*; Hamilton Tiger-Cats (2017)*
- * Offseason or practice squad member only

Career AFL statistics
- Receptions: 5
- Receiving yards: 57
- Receiving touchdowns: 2
- Tackles: 6
- Stats at ArenaFan.com
- Stats at Pro Football Reference

Royce Pollard (born June 3, 1989) is an American former football wide receiver. He was signed by the New York Jets as an undrafted free agent in 2012. He played college football at Hawaiʻi.

== Early life ==
Pollard attended University City High School in San Diego, California. He was San Diego Union-Tribune scholar-athlete in 2007.

== College career ==
Pollard played college football at the University of Hawaii. He finished college with 154 receptions, 2,140 receiving yards and 15 receiving touchdowns along with 342 kick return yards.

In his freshman year, Pollard played 8 games, and he finished the season with 4 receptions and 71 receiving yards.

In his sophomore year, he had 15 receptions and 157 receiving yards in 8 games. On September 30, 2009, he had a season-high 7 receptions for 84 yards and a season-high 146 kick return yards against Louisiana Tech.

In his junior year, In 14 games, he had 64 receptions, 901 receiving yards and 7 touchdowns. On September 2, 2010, in the season opener against USC, in which he had 7 receptions for 106 yards. In the next game against Army, he recorded 5 receptions for 94 yards and a touchdown on September 11, 2010. On October 9, 2010, he recorded 8 receptions for 96 yards against Fresno State. On November 20, 2010, in a game against San Jose State in which he recorded 4 receptions for 97 yards and touchdown.

In his senior year, he played 12 games in which he had a 71 receptions, 1,011 receiving yards and 8 touchdowns. He was named to the 2011 second-team all-WAC after his senior season. On September 10, 2011, he had 8 receptions for 128 yards against Washington. On September 24, 2011, he had 9 receptions for 145 yards against UC Davis. The next game against Louisiana Tech in which he had a career-high 10 receptions for a career-high 216 receiving yards and 3 receiving touchdowns on October 1, 2011. On October 29, 2011, he tied a season-high and career high 10 receptions for 151 receiving yards against Idaho.

== Professional career ==
=== New York Jets ===
On May 6, 2012, he was signed by the New York Jets as an undrafted free agent. On August 30, 2012, he suffered a torn labrum during preseason. On August 31, he was released on the day of final roster cuts. On September 1, 2012, he was signed to the practice squad. On September 12, 2012, he was released from the practice squad after the team signed wide receiver Stanley Arukwe to the practice squad. On September 17, 2012, he was signed to the team's practice squad after the team released Arukwe from the practice squad.

Pollard signed a reserve/future contract with the team on December 31, 2012. He was released on May 12, 2013.

=== Cleveland Gladiators ===
Pollard was assigned to the Cleveland Gladiators of the Arena Football League on November 21, 2013.

=== Los Angeles KISS ===
On October 28, 2014, Pollard was traded to the Los Angeles KISS for future considerations. Pollard was placed on reassignment on March 22, 2015.

=== Hamilton Tiger-Cats ===
On April 25, 2017, Pollard signed a free-agent contract with the Hamilton Tiger-Cats of the Canadian Football League.
