= Chaz Schilens =

American football player (born 1985)

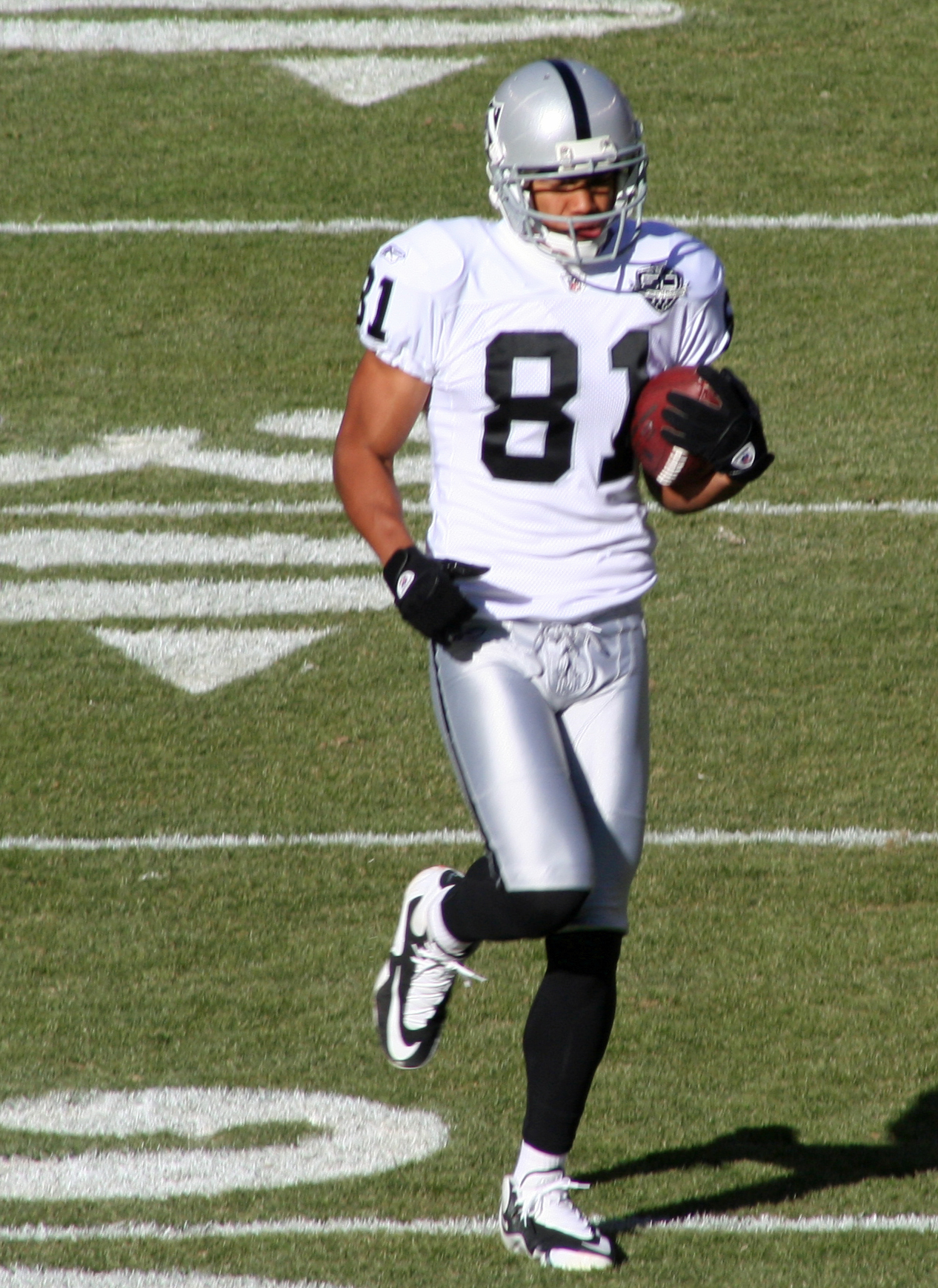
- Schilens with the Oakland Raiders in 2009

No. 81, 85
- Position: Wide receiver

Personal information
- Born: November 7, 1985 (age 41); Lancaster, California, U.S.
- Listed height: 6 ft 4 in (1.93 m)
- Listed weight: 225 lb (102 kg)

Career information
- High school: Highland (Gilbert, Arizona)
- College: San Diego State
- NFL draft: 2008: 7th round, 226th overall pick

Career history
- Oakland Raiders (2008−2011); New York Jets (2012); Detroit Lions (2013)*; Saskatchewan Roughriders (2014)
- * Offseason or practice squad member only

Career NFL statistics
- Receptions: 100
- Receiving yards: 1,191
- Receiving touchdowns: 9
- Stats at Pro Football Reference

Chazeray Dijon Schilens (born Chazeray Dijon Simmons; November 7, 1985) is an American former professional football player who was a wide receiver in the National Football League (NFL). He was selected by the Oakland Raiders in the seventh round of the 2008 NFL draft. He played high school football at Highland High School in Gilbert, Arizona, and college football for the San Diego State Aztecs.

== Professional career ==
Pre-draft measurables
Height	Weight	40-yard dash	20-yard shuttle	Three-cone drill	Vertical jump
6 ft 4 in (1.93 m)	225 lb (102 kg)	4.33 s	4.25 s	6.84 s	43 in (1.09 m)
All values from NFL Combine

=== Oakland Raiders ===
Entering Week 9 of the 2008 campaign, Schilens was named a starter, playing opposite Javon Walker. Schilens was also a factor in the outside blocking game, adding extra yardage on running plays with key blocks. In Week 16, Schilens had his best game with the Oakland Raiders, catching three passes for 52 yards including a 20-yard touchdown. He finished the 2008 campaign with 15 catches for 226 yards and two touchdowns.

Chaz broke the fifth metatarsal bone in his left foot in August, 2009, but returned to action midway through the season and caught the game-winning touchdown in an upset in Week 15 over the rival Denver Broncos.

In 2010, Schilens had another injury-plagued campaign, playing in only five games and catching five passes total.

=== New York Jets ===
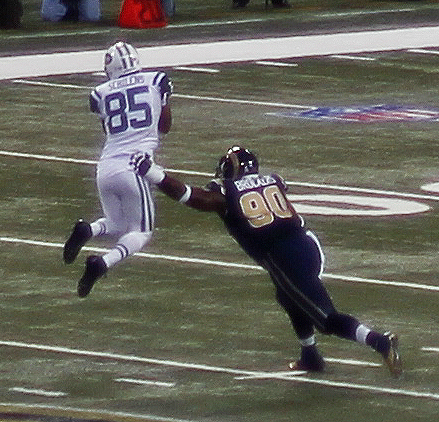
Schilens's catch helps beat the St. Louis Rams in 2012.

Schilens was signed by the New York Jets on March 16, 2012. In Schilens' first game as a Jet, he caught one pass for 8 yards from Mark Sanchez. The Jets went on to win 48−28 over division rival Buffalo Bills.

=== Detroit Lions ===
Schilens was signed by the Detroit Lions on July 24, 2013. Schilens was released on August 23, 2013.

=== Saskatchewan Roughriders ===
On March 4, 2014, Schilens agreed to terms with the Saskatchewan Roughriders of the Canadian Football League.
