= LeQuan Lewis =

American gridiron football player (born 1989)

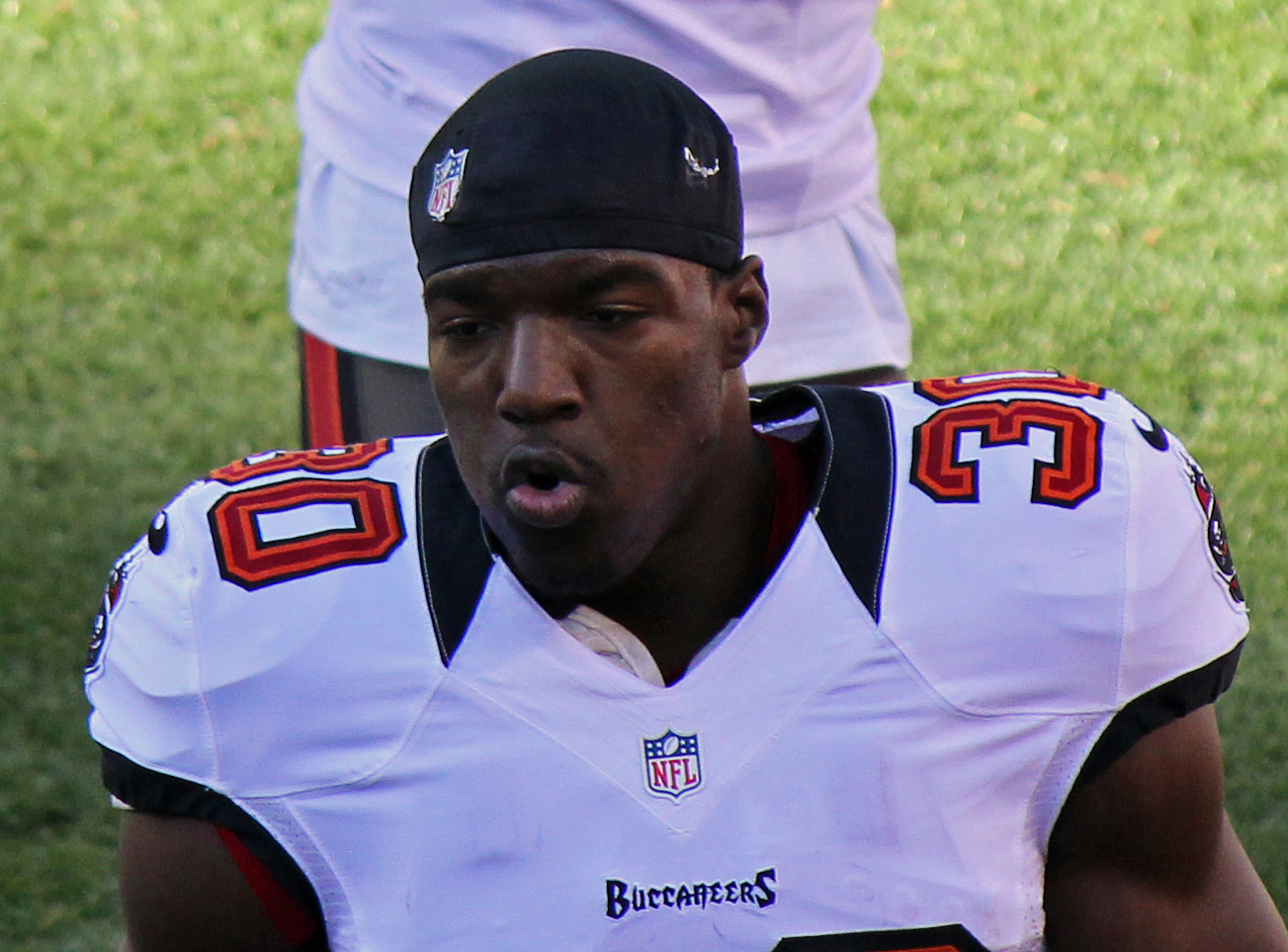
- Lewis with the Tampa Bay Buccaneers in 2012

No. 23, 30, 38
- Position: Cornerback

Personal information
- Born: February 17, 1989 (age 37); Los Angeles, California, U.S.
- Listed height: 5 ft 11 in (1.80 m)
- Listed weight: 193 lb (88 kg)

Career information
- College: Arizona State
- NFL draft: 2011: undrafted

Career history
- Tennessee Titans (2011)*; Oakland Raiders (2012)*; New York Jets (2012)*; Dallas Cowboys (2012); Tampa Bay Buccaneers (2012); Chicago Bears (2013)*; New England Patriots (2013)*; Arizona Cardinals (2014)*; Toronto Argonauts (2014); New York Jets (2014)
- * Offseason or practice squad member only

Career NFL statistics
- Tackles: 5
- Interceptions: 1
- Stats at Pro Football Reference

LeQuan Letrell Lewis (born February 17, 1989) is an American former professional football player who was a cornerback in the National Football League (NFL). He played college football for the Arizona State Sun Devils, and was signed by the Tennessee Titans as an undrafted free agent in 2011.

== Professional career ==
=== Tennessee Titans ===
On July 26, 2011, he was signed by the Tennessee Titans as an undrafted free agent. On September 2, 2011, he was released.

=== Oakland Raiders ===
In 2012, he signed with the Oakland Raiders. On June 23, 2012, he was released.

=== New York Jets (first stint) ===
The New York Jets signed Lewis on August 15, 2012. He was waived on August 25, 2012. On August 30, 2012, he was re-signed. He was waived a day later. Lewis was signed to the Jets' practice squad on September 5, 2012. He was released on September 11, 2012.

=== Dallas Cowboys ===
Lewis was signed to the Dallas Cowboys' active roster on September 12, 2012. On October 2, 2012, he was released.

=== Chicago Bears ===
On February 11, 2013, Lewis was signed by the Chicago Bears. He was released on May 13.

=== New England Patriots ===
On August 12, 2013, Lewis was signed by the New England Patriots. On August 26, 2013, he was cut by the Patriots.

=== Arizona Cardinals ===
On April 1, 2014, Lewis signed with the Arizona Cardinals to a two-year deal. He was released by the Cardinals on May 27, 2014.

=== Toronto Argonauts ===
On June 13, 2014, Lewis signed with the Toronto Argonauts of the Canadian Football League.

=== New York Jets (second stint) ===
Lewis was signed by the Jets on August 12, 2014. He was released on August 31, 2014 and signed to the team's practice squad the following day. He was promoted to the active roster on September 24, 2014, but was released on September 29, 2014. He was re-signed to the practice squad a day later. He was released on October 7, 2014.

Lewis participated in The Spring League in 2017.
