= Dedrick Epps =

American football player (born 1988)

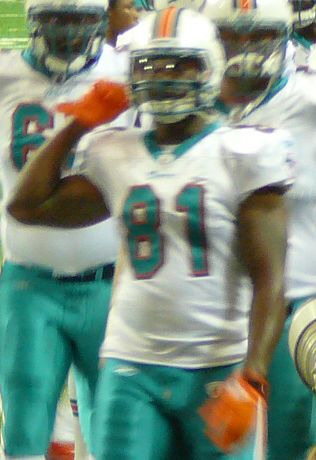
- Epps with the Miami Dolphins in 2011

No. 81, 83
- Position: Tight end

Personal information
- Born: June 19, 1988 (age 38); Richmond, Virginia, U.S.
- Listed height: 6 ft 3 in (1.91 m)
- Listed weight: 246 lb (112 kg)

Career information
- High school: Huguenot (Richmond)
- College: Miami (FL)
- NFL draft: 2010: 7th round, 235th overall pick

Career history
- San Diego Chargers (2010)*; Miami Dolphins (2010); Indianapolis Colts (2011)*; New York Jets (2011–2012)*; Chicago Bears (2012)*; New York Jets (2012)
- * Offseason or practice squad member only

Career NFL statistics
- Receptions: 1
- Receiving yards: 9
- Stats at Pro Football Reference

Dedrick Epps (born June 19, 1988) is an American former professional football player who was a tight end in the National Football League (NFL). He played college football for the Miami Hurricanes and was selected by the San Diego Chargers in the seventh round of the 2010 NFL draft.

He was also a member of the Miami Dolphins, Indianapolis Colts, Chicago Bears, and New York Jets.

== Early life ==
Epps attended Huguenot High School in Richmond, Virginia. As a senior in 2005, he caught 38 passes for more than 700 yards and eight touchdowns. He also had four two-point conversions. As a junior in 2004, he caught 15 passes for 233 yards and three touchdowns. On defense as an outside linebacker, he recorded 75 tackles and made three interceptions, one which he returned for a 75-yard touchdown. Rated the No. 12 tight end by Rivals.com, Epps accepted a football scholarship from the University of Miami.

== College career ==
Epps played for the Miami Hurricanes for four seasons and was a starter in his junior and senior seasons. His best season came as a junior, where he caught 22 passes for 304 yards and 2 touchdowns, while starting 10 games. He ended his college career with 49 receptions, 634 receiving yards, and six touchdowns.

== Professional career ==
=== San Diego Chargers ===
Epps was selected by the Chargers in the seventh round, 235th overall in the 2010 NFL draft.

=== Miami Dolphins ===
On September 14, 2010, Epps was signed to the Miami Dolphins practice squad. He was later waived on September 2, 2011.

=== Indianapolis Colts ===
Epps was signed to the Indianapolis Colts' practice squad on October 5, 2011. He was released on December 1, 2011.

=== New York Jets (first stint) ===
Epps was signed to the New York Jets' practice squad on December 20, 2011. Epps was released by the Jets on September 1, 2012.

=== Chicago Bears ===
Epps was signed to the Chicago Bears' practice squad on September 10, 2012.

=== New York Jets (second stint) ===
Epps returned to the Jets' and was signed to the active roster from the Bears' practice squad on September 14, 2012. Epps was waived/injured on October 1, 2012.
