= Stephen Hill (American football) =

American football player (born 1991)

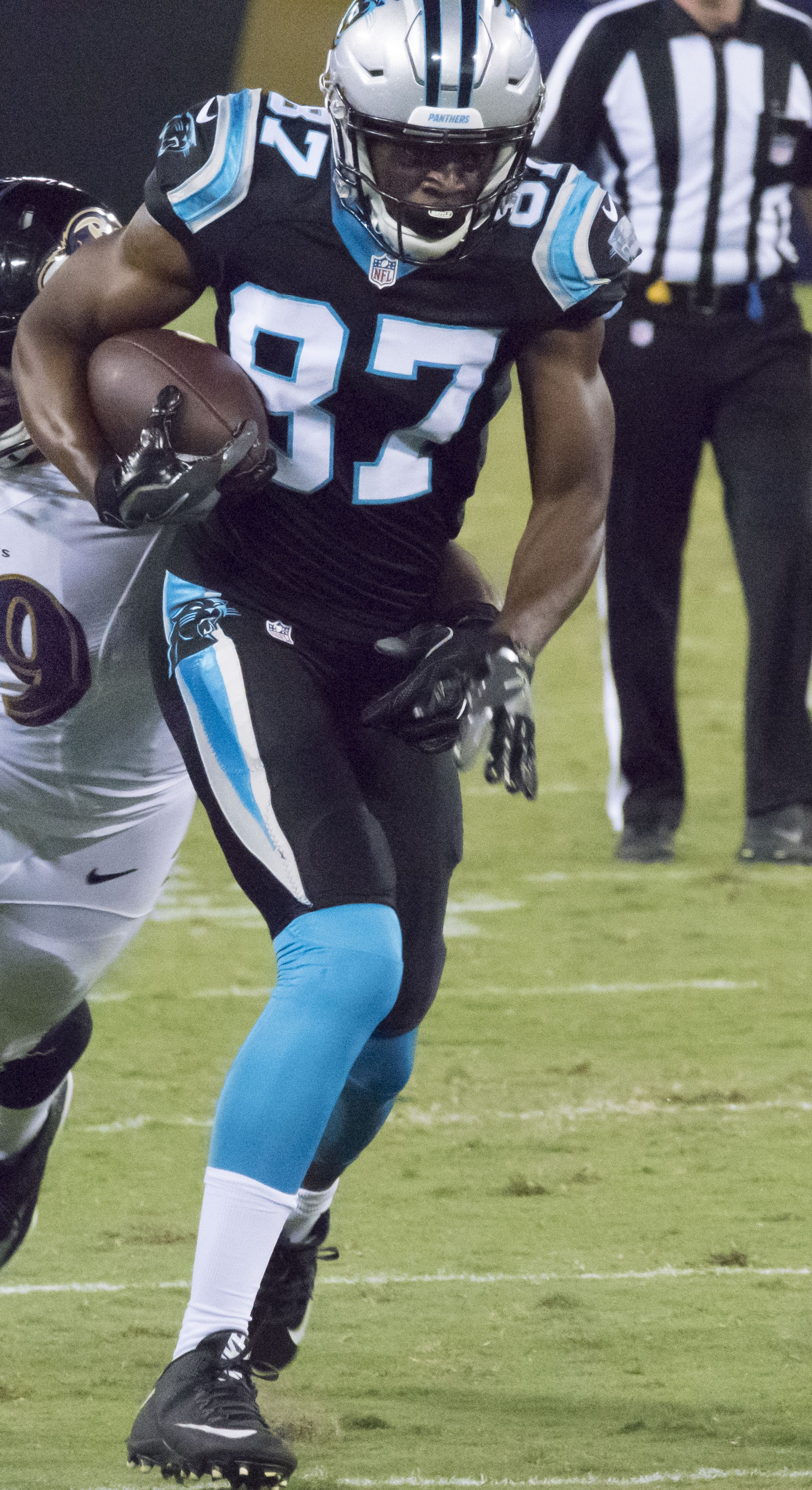
- Hill with the Carolina Panthers in 2016

No. 84, 87
- Position: Wide receiver

Personal information
- Born: April 25, 1991 (age 35); Tucker, Georgia, U.S.
- Listed height: 6 ft 4 in (1.93 m)
- Listed weight: 215 lb (98 kg)

Career information
- High school: Miller Grove (Lithonia, Georgia)
- College: Georgia Tech (2009–2011)
- NFL draft: 2012: 2nd round, 43rd overall pick

Career history
- New York Jets (2012–2013); Carolina Panthers (2014–2015); Toronto Argonauts (2017); Atlanta Legends (2019)*
- * Offseason or practice squad member only

Career NFL statistics
- Receptions: 45
- Receiving yards: 594
- Receiving touchdowns: 4
- Stats at Pro Football Reference

Stephen Trevon Hill (born April 25, 1991) is an American former professional football player who was a wide receiver in the National Football League (NFL). He played college football for the Georgia Tech Yellow Jackets and was selected by the New York Jets in the second round of the 2012 NFL draft. Hill was also a member of the Carolina Panthers, Toronto Argonauts and Atlanta Legends.

== Early life ==
Hill attended Miller Grove High School in Lithonia, Georgia, where he was rated a three-star prospect by Rivals.com. He was ranked as the No. 99 wide receiver in the class of 2009.

Hill also ran track for the Miller Grove High School and Georgia Tech track team. He broke the state long jump record with a leap of 7.84 meters as a high school senior The previous record of 7.80 meters was held by Christian Taylor, who won the NCAA Indoor NCAA championship in the long jump in 2008. Hill's long jump would have won the 2009 ACC Outdoor Championship by 6.98 centimeters and he would have placed tied for ninth at the most recent Olympic Games. He also won the 300-meter hurdles at the 2009 Georgia State Olympics, with a time of 37.91 seconds.

== College career ==
Hill attended Georgia Tech from 2009 to 2011. He studied sociology. He finished his career with 49 receptions for 1,248 yards and nine touchdowns.

On January 5, 2012, Hill announced that he would forgo his senior season and enter the 2012 NFL draft.

== Professional career ==
=== Pre-draft ===
Pre-draft measurables
Height	Weight	Arm length	Hand span	Wingspan	40-yard dash	10-yard split	20-yard split	20-yard shuttle	Three-cone drill	Vertical jump	Broad jump	Bench press
6 ft 4 in (1.93 m)	215 lb (98 kg)	33 3/8 in (0.85 m)	9 3/8 in (0.24 m)	6 ft 7 1/2 in (2.02 m)	4.36 s	1.49 s	2.51 s	4.48 s	6.88 s	39.5 in (1.00 m)	11 ft 1 in (3.38 m)	14 reps
All values from NFL Combine

At Georgia Tech's Pro Day on March 6, 2012, Hill impressed NFL scouts with his pass catching ability and route running ability, something they had previously questioned. He was considered one of the best wide receiver prospects for the 2012 NFL Draft.

=== New York Jets ===
Hill was drafted in the second round by the New York Jets, who traded their 5th and 7th round selections to the Seattle Seahawks to move up four spots to the 43rd overall and select Hill. Hill came to an agreement with the team on a four-year $5 million contract with approximately $2.8 million in guarantees on May 3, 2012. Hill was named the starting receiver, alongside Santonio Holmes, on September 6, 2012. Hill made his professional debut on September 9, 2012, against division rival Buffalo Bills. Hill recorded five receptions for 84 yards and two touchdowns from quarterback Mark Sanchez despite battling a stomach illness. Hill was placed on injured reserve on December 19, 2012 after suffering a sprained LCL in his knee. He finished the year with 252 yards and three touchdowns.

In the 2013 season, his second in the league, Hill played in twelve games with the Jets, catching passes from rookie quarterback Geno Smith. In those twelve games Hill recorded 24 catches for 342 yards and just one touchdown—the touchdown came in a Week 3 win over the Buffalo Bills where Hill racked up a career-high 108 receiving yards. After missing the Jets' Week 14 game against the Oakland Raiders with a knee injury, the Jets placed Hill on the injured reserve on December 13, 2013, ending his season. Hill was released by the Jets on August 30, 2014.

=== Carolina Panthers ===
After clearing waivers, Hill was added to practice squad of the Carolina Panthers on September 2, 2014. On August 2, 2015, he was waived/injured after tearing his right ACL. After going unclaimed, the Panthers placed Hill on injured reserve on August 5. On November 23, 2015, he was placed on reserve/suspended list for one game due to receiving a citation for marijuana possession.

On February 7, 2016, Hill's Panthers played in Super Bowl 50. In the game, the Panthers fell to the Denver Broncos by a score of 24–10.

On August 28, 2016, Hill was waived by the Panthers.

=== Toronto Argonauts ===
On May 11, 2017, Hill signed with the Toronto Argonauts of the Canadian Football League.

=== Atlanta Legends ===
On August 6, 2018, Hill signed with the Atlanta Legends of the Alliance of American Football for the 2019 season, but did not make the final roster.

== See also ==
- List of NCAA major college football yearly receiving leaders
