= 2013 New England Patriots season =

54th season in franchise history

- Owner: Robert Kraft
- Head coach: Bill Belichick
- Offensive coordinator: Josh McDaniels
- Defensive coordinator: Matt Patricia
- Home stadium: Gillette Stadium

Results
- Record: 12–4
- Division place: 1st AFC East
- Playoffs: Won Divisional Playoffs (vs. Colts) 43–22; Lost AFC Championship (at Broncos) 16–26
- All-Pros: 3: G Logan Mankins; CB Aqib Talib; FS Devin McCourty
- Pro Bowlers: 5: QB Tom Brady G Logan Mankins ST Matthew Slater K Stephen Gostkowski CB Aqib Talib

Uniform
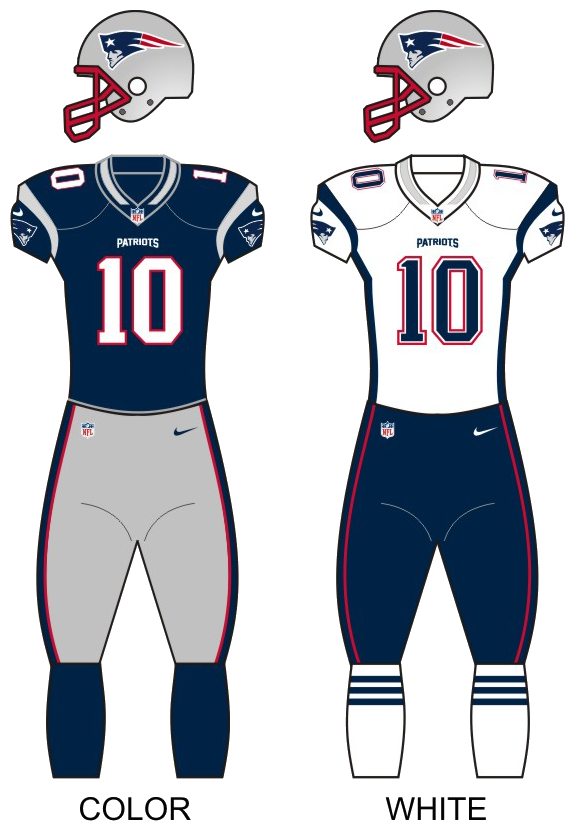

The 2013 season was the New England Patriots' 44th in the National Football League (NFL) and their 54th overall. The Patriots finished 12–4 and with the AFC's No. 2 seed for a second consecutive season. Along with their seeding, New England was awarded a first-round bye in the playoffs for the fourth season in a row, only the second such occurrence for any team since the league switched to a 6-team playoff format in 1990 (the other being the 1992–95 Dallas Cowboys). The Patriots defeated the Indianapolis Colts 43–22 in the divisional round of the playoffs, but lost in the AFC Championship game to the Denver Broncos by a score of 26–16. This was the sixth time in the span of eleven years that the Patriots would finish the regular season unbeaten at Gillette Stadium, with this feat not being achieved again until 2018.

== Roster changes ==
=== Free agency ===
Notable Departures

RB Danny Woodhead (free agent, San Diego Chargers), WR Wes Welker (free agent, Denver Broncos), WR Brandon Lloyd (released), TE Aaron Hernandez (contract terminated), G Donald Thomas (free agent, Indianapolis Colts) G Brian Waters (contract terminated), DE Trevor Scott (free agent), S Patrick Chung (free agent, Philadelphia Eagles), DT Kyle Love (released), DT Brandon Deaderick (released, Jacksonville Jaguars)

Notable Additions: QB Tim Tebow (free agent, later cut), RB LeGarrette Blount (trade), WR Danny Amendola (free agent), WR Michael Jenkins (free agent, later released), WR Donald Jones (free agent, released shortly before announcing his retirement), OT Will Svitek (free agent), DT Tommy Kelly (free agent), DT Armond Armstead (free agent/CFL), S Adrian Wilson (free agent. later placed on IR), KR/RB Leon Washington (free agent, later released, later re-signed), WR Austin Collie (free agent, later released, later re-signed).

=== 2013 draft class ===
The Patriots traded their fourth-round selection (No. 126 overall) to the Tampa Bay Buccaneers in exchange for cornerback Aqib Talib and the Buccaneers' seventh-round selection (No. 226 overall). The Patriots traded their fifth-round selection (No. 162 overall) to the Washington Redskins in exchange for defensive end Albert Haynesworth, The Patriots also traded their sixth-round selection (No. 197 overall) and their 2012 fifth-round selection to the Cincinnati Bengals in exchange for wide receiver Chad Johnson. The Patriots traded their first-round selection (No. 29th overall) to the Minnesota Vikings in exchange for selections in rounds two, three, four, and seven (No. 52, 83, 102, and 229 overall). Then, New England proceeded to trade running back Jeff Demps and the second of their three picks in the seventh round (No. 229 overall) to the Tampa Bay Buccaneers for running back LeGarrette Blount.

For the second time in five seasons, the Patriots elected not to choose a player in the first round of the draft.

2013 New England Patriots Draft Selections
Round	Overall	Player	Position	College
2	52	Jamie Collins	Linebacker	Southern Miss
2	59	Aaron Dobson	Wide receiver	Marshall
3	83	Logan Ryan	Cornerback	Rutgers
3	91	Duron Harmon	Safety	Rutgers
4	102	Josh Boyce	Wide receiver	TCU
7	226	Michael Buchanan	Defensive end	Illinois
7	235	Steve Beauharnais	Linebacker	Rutgers

== Staff ==
2013 New England Patriots staff
Front office: Chairman/CEO – Robert Kraft; President – Jonathan Kraft; General manager – Bill Belichick; Director of player personnel – Nick Caserio; Director of college scouting – Jon Robinson; Director of pro scouting – Bob Quinn; Assistant director of college scouting – Monti Ossenfort; Football research director – Ernie Adams; Head coaches: Head coach – Bill Belichick; Assistant head coach/offensive line – Dante Scarnecchia; Offensive coaches: Offensive coordinator/quarterbacks – Josh McDaniels; Running backs – Ivan Fears; Wide receivers – Chad O'Shea; Tight ends – George Godsey; Offensive assistant – Brian Daboll; Coaching assistant – Jerry Schuplinski	Defensive coaches: Defensive coordinator – Matt Patricia; Defensive line – Patrick Graham; Linebackers – Pepper Johnson; Cornerbacks – Josh Boyer; Safeties – Brian Flores; Coaching assistant – Steve Belichick; Special teams coaches: Special teams – Scott O'Brien; Assistant special teams – Joe Judge; Strength and conditioning: Strength and conditioning – Harold Nash; Assistant strength and conditioning – Moses Cabrera

== Final roster ==
2013 New England Patriots roster
Quarterbacks (QB): 12 Tom Brady; 15 Ryan Mallett; Running backs (RB): 29 LeGarrette Blount KR; 38 Brandon Bolden; 46 James Develin FB; 22 Stevan Ridley; 34 Shane Vereen; Wide receivers (WR): 80 Danny Amendola; 10 Austin Collie; 17 Aaron Dobson; 11 Julian Edelman PR; 18 Matthew Slater; 85 Kenbrell Thompkins; Tight ends (TE): 47 Michael Hoomanawanui; 88 Matthew Mulligan; 45 D.J. Williams	Offensive linemen (OL): 64 Chris Barker G; 61 Marcus Cannon T; 63 Dan Connolly G; 67 Josh Kline G; 70 Logan Mankins G; 77 Nate Solder T; 74 Will Svitek T; 62 Ryan Wendell C; Defensive linemen (DL): 92 Jake Bequette DE; 99 Michael Buchanan DE; 96 Andre Carter DE; 95 Chandler Jones DE; 94 Chris Jones DT; 50 Rob Ninkovich DE; 71 Sealver Siliga DT; 90 Isaac Sopoaga DT; 72 Joe Vellano DT	Linebackers (LB): 58 Steve Beauharnais MLB; 91 Jamie Collins OLB; 53 Ja'Gared Davis MLB; 52 Dane Fletcher MLB; 54 Dont'a Hightower OLB; 59 Chris White OLB; Defensive backs (DB): 25 Kyle Arrington; 36 Kanorris Davis SS; 37 Alfonzo Dennard CB; 43 Nate Ebner FS; 41 Justin Green CB; 28 Steve Gregory SS; 30 Duron Harmon S; 32 Devin McCourty FS; 26 Logan Ryan CB; 31 Aqib Talib CB; 27 Tavon Wilson FS; Special teams (ST): 48 Danny Aiken LS; 6 Ryan Allen P; 3 Stephen Gostkowski K	Practice squad: 68 Braxston Cave C; 65 Jordan Devey G; -- Reggie Dunn WR; 98 Marcus Forston DT; 66 R.J. Mattes T; 39 Sam McGuffie RB; 14 Greg Orton WR; -- Taylor Reed OLB; Reserve: 97 Armond Armstead DT (NF-Inj.); 82 Josh Boyce WR (IR); 72 Elvis Fisher T (IR); 67 Cory Grissom DT (IR); 87 Rob Gronkowski TE (IR); 13 Mark Harrison WR (NF-Inj.); 42 Quentin Hines RB (IR); 93 Tommy Kelly DT (IR); 51 Jerod Mayo OLB (IR); 84 T. J. Moe WR (IR); 60 Brice Schwab T (IR); 55 Brandon Spikes MLB (IR); 76 Sebastian Vollmer T (IR); 75 Vince Wilfork DT (IR); 24 Adrian Wilson SS (IR); 66 Markus Zusevics G (IR); Rookies in italics 53 active, 16 reserve, 8 practice squad

== Schedule ==
=== Preseason ===
Week	Date	Opponent	Result	Record	Game site	NFL.com recap
1	August 9	at Philadelphia Eagles	**W** 31–22	1–0	Lincoln Financial Field	Recap
2	August 16	Tampa Bay Buccaneers	**W** 25–21	2–0	Gillette Stadium	Recap
3	August 22	at Detroit Lions	**L** 9–40	2–1	Ford Field	Recap
4	August 29	New York Giants	**W** 28–20	3–1	Gillette Stadium	Recap

The performances of quarterback Tim Tebow during the preseason became a focal point of media coverage of the team. After connecting on two touchdowns to Quentin Sims in the game against the New York Giants, Tebow was released by the Patriots on August 31, 2013.

=== Regular season ===
For the first time since the 2002 season, the Patriots did not play the Indianapolis Colts during the regular season, though the two teams met in the playoffs. The Colts–Patriots rivalry had become one of the most known in modern era sports.

Week	Date	Opponent	Result	Record	Game site	NFL.com recap
1	September 8	at **Buffalo Bills**	**W** 23–21	1–0	Ralph Wilson Stadium	Recap
2	September 12	**New York Jets**	**W** 13–10	2–0	Gillette Stadium	Recap
3	September 22	Tampa Bay Buccaneers	**W** 23–3	3–0	Gillette Stadium	Recap
4	September 29	at Atlanta Falcons	**W** 30–23	4–0	Georgia Dome	Recap
5	October 6	at Cincinnati Bengals	**L** 6–13	4–1	Paul Brown Stadium	Recap
6	October 13	New Orleans Saints	**W** 30–27	5–1	Gillette Stadium	Recap
7	October 20	at **New York Jets**	**L** 27–30 (OT)	5–2	MetLife Stadium	Recap
8	October 27	**Miami Dolphins**	**W** 27–17	6–2	Gillette Stadium	Recap
9	November 3	Pittsburgh Steelers	**W** 55–31	7–2	Gillette Stadium	Recap
10	Bye					
11	November 18	at Carolina Panthers	**L** 20–24	7–3	Bank of America Stadium	Recap
12	November 24	Denver Broncos	**W** 34–31 (OT)	8–3	Gillette Stadium	Recap
13	December 1	at Houston Texans	**W** 34–31	9–3	Reliant Stadium	Recap
14	December 8	Cleveland Browns	**W** 27–26	10–3	Gillette Stadium	Recap
15	December 15	at **Miami Dolphins**	**L** 20–24	10–4	Sun Life Stadium	Recap
16	December 22	at Baltimore Ravens	**W** 41–7	11–4	M&T Bank Stadium	Recap
17	December 29	**Buffalo Bills**	**W** 34–20	12–4	Gillette Stadium	Recap

Note: Intra-division opponents are in bold text.

== Game summaries ==
=== Regular season ===
==== Week 1: at Buffalo Bills ====
Week One: New England Patriots at Buffalo Bills – Game summary

Quarter	1	2	3	4	Total
Patriots	10	7	0	6	23
Bills	0	14	7	0	21

at Ralph Wilson Stadium, Orchard Park, New York

- Date: September 8
- Game time: 1:00 p.m. EDT
- Game weather: 65 °F (18 °C), sunny
- Game attendance: 65,519
- Referee: Walt Anderson
- TV announcers (CBS): Greg Gumbel (play-by-play), Dan Dierdorf (color commentator) and Tracy Wolfson (sideline reporter)
- Recap, Gamebook

Game information

First quarter

- Julian Edelman 9-yard pass from Tom Brady (Stephen Gostkowski kick), 10:46. Patriots 7–0. Drive: 3 plays, 16 yards, 0:47.
- Stephen Gostkowski 48-yard field goal, 4:47. Patriots 10–0. Drive: 9 plays, 20 yards, 3:43.

Second quarter

- Da'Norris Searcy 74-yard fumble return (Dan Carpenter kick), 8:25. Patriots 10–7.
- Julian Edelman 8-yard pass from Tom Brady (Stephen Gostkowski kick), 1:55. Patriots 17–7. Drive: 4 plays, 32 yards, 1:50.
- Robert Woods 18-yard pass from EJ Manuel (Dan Carpenter kick), 0:34. Patriots 17–14. Drive: 2 plays, 37 yards, 0:39.

Third quarter

- Stevie Johnson 18-yard pass from EJ Manuel (Dan Carpenter kick), 11:03. Bills 21–17. Drive: 11 plays, 80 yards, 3:57.

Fourth quarter

- Stephen Gostkowski 33-yard field goal, 10;48. Bills 21–20. Drive: 9 plays, 70 yards, 3:29.
- Stephen Gostkowski 35-yard field goal, 0:05. Patriots 23–21 Drive: 12 plays, 49 yards, 4:26.

Top passers

- NE – Tom Brady: 29/52, 288 YDS, 2 TD, INT
- BUF – EJ Manuel: 18/27, 150 YDS, 2 TD

Top rushers

- NE – Shane Vereen: 14 CAR, 101 YDS
- BUF – Fred Jackson: 13 CAR, 67 YDS

Top receivers

- NE – Danny Amendola: 10 REC, 104 YDS
- BUF – Fred Jackson: 4 REC, 41 YDS

Top tacklers

- NE – Jerod Mayo: 12 TKL, 3 AST
- BUF – Jim Leonhard: 9 TKL

In the season opener, both teams featured key new players to their franchises: the Bills' rookie quarterback EJ Manuel and the Patriots' new wide receiver Danny Amendola. Tom Brady struggled as the chemistry between him and his receivers was not great and as a result, Brady was inaccurate throughout the game. The Bills managed to take the lead in the 3rd quarter, but Brady mounted a masterful 4th quarter comeback by throwing quick, accurate passes to an injured Amendola to set up Gostowski for a game-winning field goal. The Patriots began their season 1–0 for the 10th straight year.

==== Week 2: vs. New York Jets ====
Week Two: New York Jets at New England Patriots – Game summary

Quarter	1	2	3	4	Total
Jets	3	0	7	0	10
Patriots	10	3	0	0	13

at Gillette Stadium, Foxborough, Massachusetts

- Date: September 12
- Game time: 8:25 p.m. EDT
- Game weather: 72 °F (22 °C), cloudy, warm and humid
- Game attendance: 68,756
- Referee: Carl Cheffers
- TV announcers (NFLN): Brad Nessler (play-by-play), Mike Mayock (color commentator) and Alex Flanagan (sideline reporter)
- Recap, Gamebook

Game information

First quarter

- NE- 12:54 Aaron Dobson 39-yard TD pass from Tom Brady, (Stephen Gostkowski kick.) Drive: 6 plays, 81 yards, 2:06. (NE 7-0)
- NE- 9:17 Stephen Gostkowski 21-yard FG. Drive: 4 plays, 5 yards, 1:00. (NE 10-0)
- NYJ- 4:01 Nick Folk 37-yard FG. Drive: 11 plays, 61 yards, 5:16. (NE 10-3)

Second quarter

- NE- 5:05 Stephen Gostkowski 30-yard FG. Drive: 5 plays, 43 yards, 1:27. (NE 13-3)

Third quarter

- NYJ- 5:05 Bilal Powell 3-yard TD run (Nick Folk kick.) Drive: 9 plays, 58 yards, 5:00. (NE 13-10)

Fourth quarter

- No scoring

Top passers

- NYJ – Geno Smith: 15/35, 214 yards, 3 INT
- NE – Tom Brady: 19/39, 185 yards, TD

Top rushers

- NYJ – Chris Ivory: 12 carries, 52 yards
- NE – Stevan Ridley: 16 carries, 40 yards

Top receivers

- NYJ – Stephen Hill: 4 receptions, 86 yards
- NE – Julian Edelman: 13 receptions, 78 yards

Top tacklers

- NYJ – Antonio Allen: 5 tackles, 4 assists
- NE – Dont'a Hightower: 4 tackles, 4 assists

The Patriots home opener featured the long-time division rival Jets and their new rookie quarterback Geno Smith. The Patriots struck first with Tom Brady hitting a wide open Aaron Dobson for a 39-yard touchdown pass, his first of the year. Because It rained heavily throughout the game, it resulted in poor offenses from both teams. Brady failed to complete even 50% of his passes on the day. The lone bright spot on the Patriots offense was Julian Edelman, who caught 13 passes for 78 yards. After leading 13–3 at halftime, the Jets would try to rally with a 3-yard touchdown run by Bilal Powell, however the Pats' defense made a critical stop as the team improved to 2–0.

==== Week 3: vs. Tampa Bay Buccaneers ====
Week Three: Tampa Bay Buccaneers at New England Patriots – Game summary

Quarter	1	2	3	4	Total
Buccaneers	3	0	0	0	3
Patriots	0	17	3	3	23

at Gillette Stadium, Foxborough, Massachusetts

- Date: September 22
- Game time: 1:00 p.m. EDT
- Game weather: 65 °F (18 °C), sunny
- Game attendance: 68,756
- Referee: Jeff Triplette
- TV announcers (Fox): Kevin Burkhardt (play-by-play), John Lynch (color commentator) and Erin Andrews (sideline reporter)
- Recap, Gamebook

Game information

First quarter

- TB- 1:50 Rian Lindell 30-yard FG. Drive: 13 plays, 71 yards, 6:01. (TB 3-0)

Second quarter

- NE- 7:31 Kenbrell Thompkins 17-yard pass from Tom Brady (Stephen Gostkowski kick.) Drive: 11 plays, 66 yards, 5:13. (NE 7-3)
- NE- 0:47 Kenbrell Thompkins 5-yard pass from Tom Brady (Stephen Gostkowski kick.) Drive: 10 plays, 63 yards, 3:33. (NE 14-3)
- NE- 0:00 Stephen Gostkowski 53-yard FG. Drive: 3 plays, 8 yards, 0:11. (NE 17-3)

Third quarter

- NE- 3:38 Stephen Gostkowski 46-yard FG. Drive: 8 plays, 36 yards, 4:15. (NE 20-3)

Fourth quarter

- NE- 8:19 Stephen Gostkowski 33-yard FG. Drive: 10 plays, 51 yards, 4:44. (NE 23-3)

Top passers

- TB – Josh Freeman – 19/41, 236 yards, INT
- NE – Tom Brady – 25/36, 225 yards, 2 TD, INT

Top rushers

- TB – Doug Martin – 20 carries, 88 yards
- NE – LeGarrette Blount – 14 carries, 65 yards, TD

Top receivers

- TB – Mike Williams – 5 receptions, 65 yards
- NE – Aaron Dobson – 7 receptions, 52 yards

Top tacklers

- TB – Mark Barron – 11 tackles, 8 solo, 0.5 sack
- NE – Jerod Mayo – 9 tackles, 8 solo, 1.0 sack

The Patriots rolled through the struggling Buccaneers to improve to 3–0. Although the Patriots struggled early, they finally flexed their muscles on offense with an equally as impressive show of force on defense. On the first play of the game, Tom Brady hit Brandon Bolden for 11 yards and a first down. After an incomplete pass, Brady hit receiver Julian Edelman for 8 yards, but on 3rd-and-2, Brady was sacked by Lavonte David and Mark Barron and the Patriots punted. Josh Freeman drove the Buccaneers 50 yards in 8 plays, but Rian Lindell missed a 38-yard field goal. The Patriots punted again on their next drive. This time the Buccaneers drove 71 yards aided by 35 yards in Patriots penalties before Rian Lindell hit a 30-yard field goal, giving the Buccaneers a 3–0 lead. An 8-yard sack by Adrian Clayborn doomed the Patriots next drive as they punted again. With the drive starting at their own 45, the Bucs drove to the Patriots 34, but on 4th-and-5, rather than attempt a 52-yard field goal, they went for the first down, but Freeman's pass was incomplete. The Patriots' offense finally got going on the succeeding drive. Brady completed two passes to rookie receiver Aaron Dobson, including a 4-yard catch on 4th-and-2. Then hit Kenbrell Thompkins for a 16-yard touchdown pass as the Patriots marched 66 yards to take a 7–3 lead early in the 2nd quarter. The Bucs drove to the Patriots 38-yard line on their next drive once again turned it over on downs when Doug Martin was tackled for no gain by Brandon Spikes on 4th-and-1. This time Brady commandeered a 61-yard drive and hit Thompkins for a 5-yard touchdown pass, extending the lead 14–3. Josh Freeman was intercepted by ex-Buc Aqib Talib on the next drive and Stephen Gostkowski hit a 53-yard field goal right before halftime. Tom Brady threw an interception on the Patriots first drive after halftime, but the Buccaneers punted on their first two after halftime. Gostkowski later kicked a 46-yard field goal for the only scoring of the 3rd quarter as the Patriots defense shut down the Buccaneers. The Buccaneers turned it over for the third time on downs early in the fourth-quarter. The Patriots took it and kicked a 33-yard field-goal for the final score of 23–3. Tom Brady had his best game of the season so far going 25/36 for 225 yards and 2 touchdowns with 1 interception despite 3 sacks. Running back Doug Martin could not reach the end zone for Tampa Bay despite running for 88 yards and Josh Freeman could not lead the Buccaneers offense to a touchdown. Tampa Bay's starting quarterback Josh Freeman would be released in the week following the game.

==== Week 4: at Atlanta Falcons ====
Week Four: New England Patriots at Atlanta Falcons – Game summary

Quarter	1	2	3	4	Total
Patriots	0	10	3	17	30
Falcons	3	7	0	13	23

at Georgia Dome, Atlanta, Georgia

- Date: September 29
- Game time: 8:30 p.m. EDT
- Game weather: Played indoors (dome stadium)
- Game attendance: 70,744
- Referee: Walt Coleman
- TV announcers (NBC): Al Michaels (play-by-play), Cris Collinsworth (color commentator) and Michele Tafoya (sideline reporter)
- Recap, Game book

Game information

First quarter

- ATL- 9:23 Matt Bryant 23-yard FG Drive: 14 plays, 75 yards, 5:37. (ATL 3-0)

Second quarter

- NE- 14:43 Matthew Mulligan 1-yard pass from Tom Brady (Stephen Gostkowski kick.) Drive: 12 plays, 76 yards, 6:05. (NE 7-3)
- NE- 3:22 Stephen Gostkowski 48-yard FG. Drive: 7 plays, 62 yards, 2:57. (NE 10-3)
- ATL- 0:38 Tony Gonzalez 21-yard pass from Matt Ryan (Matt Bryant kick.) Drive: 8 plays, 80 yards, 2:44. (Tied 10-10)

Third quarter

- NE- 5:24 Stephen Gostkowski 22-yard FG. Drive: 14 plays, 89 yards, 6:15. (NE 13-10)

Fourth quarter

- NE- 14:26 LeGarrette Blount 46-yard run (Stephen Gostkowski kick.) Drive: 6 plays, 63 yards, 2:27. (NE 20-10)
- ATL- 11:52 Matt Bryant 45-yard FG Drive: 6 plays, 53 yards, 2:34. (NE 20-13)
- NE- 9:43 Kenbrell Thompkins 18-yard pass from Tom Brady (Stephen Gostkowski kick.) Drive: 5 plays, 80 yards, 2:09. (NE 27-13)
- NE- 6:18 Stephen Gostkowski 49-yard FG. Drive: 6 plays, 28 yards, 3:17. (NE 30-13)
- ATL- 4:22 Tony Gonzalez 11-yard pass from Matt Ryan (Matt Bryant kick.) Drive: 7 plays, 80 yards, 1:56. (NE 30-20)
- ATL- 2:55 Matt Bryant 25-yard FG Drive: 7 plays, 45 yards, 1:27. (NE 30-23)

Top passers

- NE – Tom Brady – 20/31, 316 yards, 2 TD
- ATL – Matt Ryan – 34/54, 421 yards, 2 TD, INT

Top rushers

- NE – LeGarrette Blount – 9 carries, 64 yards, TD
- ATL – Jacquizz Rodgers – 7 carries, 32 yards

Top receivers

- NE – Kenbrell Thompkins – 6 receptions, 127 yards, TD
- ATL – Tony Gonzalez – 12 receptions, 149 yards, 2 TD

Top tacklers

- NE – Devin McCourty – 9 tackles
- ATL – Akeem Dent – 8 tackles

In their first strong test of the season, the Patriots defeated Matt Ryan and the Falcons in a close battle on Sunday Night Football to go 4–0. In what was billed a potential Super Bowl preview before the season, the Falcons limped to a 1–3 start after their defeat to New England.

After receiving the opening kickoff The Falcons got on the scoreboard first with a long, 14-play 75-yard drive which chewed 5:37 off the clock. They drove all the way to the Patriots 5-yard line, but had to settle for a 23-yard field goal by kicker Matt Bryant. The Patriots responded later in the first quarter with a marathon drive of their own taking over 6 minutes off the clock, 12 plays and 76 yards later, third-string running back Brandon Bolden ran for a 3-yard touchdown, but the Falcons challenged and he didn't break the plane of the end zone, moving the ball back to the 1. Two plays later, Brady hit back-up tight end Matthew Mulligan for a 7–3 lead. On the following drive the Falcons put together another long, strong drive to the Patriots 15-yard line. On 3rd-and-10, Ryan found Jacquizz Rodgers on a screen pass for 8 yards, the Falcons kept the offense on the field, though, but on 4th-and-2 Ryan couldn't complete his pass intended for Roddy White and they turned it over on downs. The Patriots took over and marched to the Falcons 31, aided by a 49-yard completion from Brady to Thompkins, before Gostkowski booted a 48-yard field goal, extending the lead to 10–3. Right before half-time, Ryan and the Falcons stormed 80 yards in 8 plays eventually, scoring on Ryan's 21-yard touchdown pass to Tony González with 0:46 left in the half which tied the game at 10. After the first two drives of the second half ended in punts, the Patriots put together a 14 play, 89-yard drive, taking 6:15 off the clock, driving all the way to the Falcons 4, but were forced to settle for a 22-yard field goal, giving them a 13–10 lead. This was the only score of the third quarter for either team. On the first play of the fourth quarter, on 3rd-and-19, Brady hit Thompkins for 26 yards with 15 added yards on a helmet-to-helmet hit by safety William Moore, moving the ball to the Falcons 47-yard line. On the very next play LeGarrette Blount burst through the middle and down the sideline for a 47-yard touchdown run to cap off a 6 play, 63-yard drive, increasing the lead to 20–10. The Falcons responded on their next possession driving all the way to the Patriot 18, but on 3rd-and-5, Michael Buchanan sacked Ryan, and Bryant kicked a 45-yard field goal, trimming the score back to 7 at 20–13. It wouldn't last though. The Patriots responded by racing 80 yards in only 5 plays, aided by a 44-yard screen pass to Edelman, scoring on an incredible 18-yard touchdown catch by Thompkins for the largest lead of the night at 27–13. Ryan was intercepted by Talib on the first play of the ensuing drive and the Patriots cashed in with Gostkowski's 49-yard field goal with 6:18 remaining, seemingly putting the game out of reach with a 30–13 score. However, the Falcons didn't quit. Down three scores the Falcons stormed 80 yards in 7 plays, taking less than two minutes, with Ryan hitting Gonzalez on an 11-yard touchdown pass, trimming the deficit to 30–20 with only 4:22 remaining. The Falcons recovered the onside kick after it was fumbled by Sudfeld and drove to their own 7, but couldn't reach the end zone and Bryant kicked a 25-yard field goal making it a one possession deficit again at 30–23 with just 3:00 remaining. After an 8-yard run by Blount on 1st-down, Brady only gained a yards, and on 3rd-and-1 Blount seemingly stretched for a 1st down, but was ruled short, though replays showed he got the first down. After a timeout, the Patriots went for it on 4th-and-1, but Brady fumbled the snap for a turnover on downs. Starting from their own 38, Ryan connected with Julio Jones for a 49-yard bomb to the Patriots 13. After back-to-back incompletions, Ryan hit Jacquizz Rodgers for 3 yards to the 10, setting up a do-or-die 4th-and-7. Ryan threw the pass in White's direction, but the pass was broken up by Talib with just 0:41 seconds left. Two kneels by Brady sealed the deal and the Patriots were 4–0 with their 4th win against the Falcons since 2001.

==== Week 5: at Cincinnati Bengals ====
Week Five: New England Patriots at Cincinnati Bengals – Game summary

Quarter	1	2	3	4	Total
Patriots	0	3	0	3	6
Bengals	0	3	3	7	13

at Paul Brown Stadium, Cincinnati, Ohio

- Date: October 6
- Game time: 1:00 p.m. EDT
- Game weather: 68 °F (20 °C), cloudy
- Game attendance: 64,259
- Referee: Gene Steratore
- TV announcers (CBS): Greg Gumbel (play-by-play) and Dan Dierdorf (color commentator)
- Recap, Gamebook

Game information

First quarter

- No scoring

Second quarter

- CIN- 3:12 Mike Nugent 39-yard field goal Drive: 10 plays, 49 yards, 4:42. (CIN 3-0)
- NE- 0:08 Stephen Gostkowski 42-yard field goal Drive: 5 plays, 25 yards, 0:29. (Tied 3-3)

Third quarter

- CIN- 5:43 Mike Nugent 50-yard field goal Drive: 13 plays, 59 yards, 6:17. (CIN 6-3)

Fourth quarter

- CIN- 9:21 Benjarvus Green-Ellis 1-yard run (Mike Nugent kick.) Drive: 14 plays, 93 yards, 7:48. (CIN 13-3)
- NE- 6:28 Stephen Gostkowski 19-yard field goal Drive: 7 plays, 22 yards, 2:53. (CIN 13-6)

Top passers

- NE – Tom Brady – 18/38, 197 yards, INT
- CIN – Andy Dalton – 20/27, 212 yards, INT

Top rushers

- NE – LeGarrette Blount 12 carries, 51 yards
- CIN – Benjarvus Green-Ellis 19 carries, 67 yards, TD

Top receivers

- NE – Danny Amendola – 4 receptions, 55 yards
- CIN – A. J. Green – 5 receptions, 61 yards

Top tacklers

- NE – Devin McCourty – 12 tackles, 8 solo
- CIN – Vontaze Burfict – 8 tackles, 7 solo, 1.0 sacks

The Patriots first loss of the season came in Cincinnati, as the Patriots struggled to gain any offense against a great Bengals defense. Tom Brady's consecutive games with a TD pass streak ended at 52, two games short of Drew Brees' record, against the same team which he had started the streak in 2010. From start to finish the Bengals defensive line led by Geno Atkins made mince meat of the Patriots offensive line. Brady was hit and sacked early and often on the day. Both teams' defenses played extremely well in the game The first quarter was tough, physically demanding, and scoreless with both teams' first two drives ending in punts.

Andy Dalton drove the Bengals to the Patriots' 9-yard line, but was intercepted by Brandon Spikes. The scoring started in the second quarter. After a Bengals punt, two completions and a 15-yard penalty moved the ball to the Bengals 32 yard-line. However, Blount fumbled late in the 2nd quarter after being tackled by Carlos Dunlap with Reggie Nelson recovering at the Cincinnati 30. Dalton sustained a short, 49-yard drive that ended in a 39-yard field-goal by Mike Nugent. The big play was an 18-yard catch by A. J. Green on 3rd-and-5. The Patriots punted on their next possession, but forced a three-and-out on their next drive. Brady led the Patriots to the Bengals 24-yard line and Stephen Gostowski kicked a 42-yard field goal with 13 seconds remaining in the first half to tie the game at 3–3. Cincinnati scored on their second drive of the second half. Marching down the field on a 13-play, 59-yard drive, eating 6:17 off the clock, that culminated in a 50-yard field goal by Nugent. On their first possession of the fourth quarter, the Bengals scored the only touchdown of the day, with a 14-play, 93-yard drive, taking 7:48 off the clock, scoring on a 1-yard touchdown run by BenJarvus Green-Ellis on 4th-and-goal, extending the lead to 13–3. Giovani Bernard had a 28-yard run on 3rd-and-15, to the Bengals 30 on the drive. On their next drive, the Patriots, aided by a 53-yard completion to Dobson, though Dobson momentarily fumbled, drove all the way to the Bengals 1-yard line, but Blount was stuffed for no gain on 1st-down and two straight incompletions for the Patriots to settle for a 19-yard field goal by Gostkowski, trimming the deficit to 13–6. On the Bengals next drive, McCourty forced Bernard to fumble with Mayo recovering at the Bengals 46. On the drive, Brady launched a deep pass to Dobson, who caught it momentarily, but Terrence Newman punched the ball out. After an incomplete pass intended for Amendola, Brady was sacked by Wallace Gilberry and the Patriots punted. After a Bengals three-and-out, the Patriots drove to the Cincinnati 27 yard line before throwing a final fade intended for Dobson, but the ball was under-thrown and intercepted by Pacman Jones with 0:17 seconds remaining, and the Patriots lost for the first time of the season. This was also their first loss to the Bengals since 2001.

Brady completed just 18 of 38 passes for 197 yards and 4 sacks. Danny Amendola had 4 catches for 55 yards in his first game since the season-opener due to a knee injury. The Bengals out-gained the Patriots 348–241, had more first downs 21–15, led in time of possession 35:44-24:16. Both teams had two turnovers apiece.

==== Week 6: vs. New Orleans Saints ====
Week Six: New Orleans Saints at New England Patriots – Game summary

Quarter	1	2	3	4	Total
Saints	7	0	10	10	27
Patriots	3	14	3	10	30

at Gillette Stadium, Foxborough, Massachusetts

- Date: October 13
- Game time: 4:25 p.m. EDT
- Game weather: 59 °F (15 °C), partly cloudy
- Game attendance: 68,756
- Referee: Tony Corrente
- TV announcers (Fox): Thom Brennaman (play-by-play), Troy Aikman (color commentator) and Pam Oliver (sideline reporter)
- Recap, Gamebook

Game information

First quarter

- NE- 9:54 Stephen Gostkowski 35-yard FG 14 plays, 60 yards, 5:06 (NE 3-0)
- NO- 1:46 Travaris Cadet 3-yard pass from Drew Brees (Garrett Hartley kick.) 9 plays, 73 yards, 5:23 (NO 7-3)

Second quarter

- NE- 13:00 Stevan Ridley 1-yard run (Stephen Gostkowski kick.) 9 plays, 80 yards, 3:46 (NE 10-7)
- NE- 7:36 Stevan Ridley 4-yard run (Stephen Gostkowski kick.) 12 plays, 69 yards, 4:52 (NE 17-7)

Third quarter

- NO- 11:27 Garrett Hartley 28-yard FG 8 plays, 70 yards, 3:33 (NE 17-10)
- NO- 6:19 Khiry Robinson 3-yard run (Garrett Hartley kick.) 9 plays, 67 yards, 4:07 (Tied 17-17)
- NE- 1:36 Stephen Gostkowski 35-yard FG 12 plays, 54 yards, 4:43 (NE 20-17)

Fourth quarter

- NE- 8:34 Stephen Gostkowski 23-yard FG 7 plays, 15 yards, 3:36 (NE 23-17)
- NO- 3:29 Kenny Stills 34-yard pass from Drew Brees (Garrett Hartley kick.) 10 plays, 81 yards, 5:05 (NO 24-23)
- NO- 2:24 Garrett Hartley 39-yard FG 4 plays, 3 yards, 0:22 (NO 27-23)
- NE- 0:05 Kenbrell Thompkins 17-yard pass from Tom Brady (Stephen Gostkowski kick.) 8 plays, 70 yards, 1:08 (NE 30-27)

Top passers

- NO – Drew Brees – 17/36, 236 yards, 2 TD, INT
- NE – Tom Brady – 25/43, 269 yards, TD, INT

Top rushers

- NO – Khiry Robinson – 7 rushes, 53 yards, TD
- NE – Stevan Ridley – 20 rushes, 96 yards, 2 TD

Top receivers

- NO – Kenny Stills – 3 receptions, 64 yards, TD
- NE – Aaron Dobson – 6 receptions, 63 yards,

Top tacklers

- NO – Curtis Lofton – 12 tackles, 8 assists, 1.0 sack
- NE – Joe Vellano – 8 tackles, 2 assists

In a thrilling back and forth affair, the Patriots managed a sensational comeback against the undefeated Saints. Following the opening kickoff, Brady put together a 14-play 60-yard drive. The Patriots drove to the Saints 12, but on 3rd-and-7 Tom Brady was sacked for a 5-yard loss forcing them to settle for Stephen Gostkowski's 35-yard field goal to take the opening lead 3–0. The Saints went 3-and-out on their opening drive and the Patriots followed that with a 3-and-out of their own. The Saints responded by marching 73 yards taking over five minutes off the clock with Drew Brees tossing a 3-yard touchdown pass to Travaris Cadet. The Patriots immediately responded by slowly moving 80 yards to take a 10–7 lead on Stevan Ridley's 1-yard touchdown run. The Saints went 3-and-out yet again on their next drive and the Patriots took advantage with a long drive taking up 4:52 seconds in 12 plays as they marched 69 yards to increase their lead to 17–7 on another Stevan Ridley touchdown run, this one from 4 yards out. Punts filled the !of the half and the Patriots led 17–7 at halftime. The Saints took the opening kickoff of the second half 70 yards to the Patriots 10, but the Patriots kept them out of the end zone and Garrett Hartley kicked a 28-yard field goal to trim the lead 17–10. After a Patriots 3-and-out, the Saints stormed 67 yards with Khiry Robinson rushing for a 3-yard touchdown to suddenly tie the game at 17. The Patriots managed to respond on the follow-up drive marching 54 yards in 12 plays, but settled for Gostkowski's 54-yard field goal to retake the lead 20–17. Early in the fourth quarter on 3rd-and-12, the Drew Brees called a timeout to avoid delay of game, but the referees didn't see it so Brees was forced to snap the ball. Brees forced a pass intended for Jimmy Graham, but was intercepted by Kyle Arrington at the Saints 25 and returned for 5 yards to the Saints 20. The Patriots managed to reach the Saints 5-yard line, but were kept out of the end zone and Gostkowski kicked a 23-yard field goal to increase th Patriots lead to 23–17. The Saints immediately responded by storming 81 yards in 5:05 with Brees connecting with Kenny Stills on a 34-yard touchdown pass on 3rd-and-20, giving the Saints their second lead of the night 24–23. Four straight incompletions from Brady on the next drive seemingly ended the game, but the Patriots held the Saints to only three yards and Hartley kicked a 39-yard field goal to increase the lead to 27–23. Brady threw a seemingly game deciding interception with just 2:16 remaining but once again, the Patriots defense managed to hold the Saints to a 3-and-out (mostly due to the Saints erratic play calling). Brady got the ball back at his own 30 with 1:13 remaining and no timeouts, and mounted his 39th career game-winning drive. Tom Brady hit Edelman for 23 yards on the first play to move the ball to the Saints 47. He then completed passes to Austin Collie for 15 yards and Aaron Dobson for 6 yards moving the ball to the Saints 26-yard line with 0:35 seconds left. Back-to-back incompletions set up a 4th-and-4. Brady completed a pass to Collie again for 9 yards. Brady spiked the ball at the 17 with :10 seconds remaining. On the very next play, Brady connected with Thompkins for a 17-yard touchdown pass with five seconds remaining on the clock giving the Patriots the 30–27 lead. The Saints attempted a hook-and-lateral on the kickoff, but Darren Sproles fumbled and Jamie Collins recovered to end the game. The win (his 28th comeback win and 40th game-winning 4th quarter drive) was also his first in four tries against a Drew Brees-quarterbacked team. With the exception of the final drive, the Patriots pass protection was horrid allowing 5 sacks. The Patriots pass defense played very well, with vaunted tight end Jimmy Graham not catching a single pass all night.

==== Week 7: at New York Jets ====
Week Seven: New England Patriots at New York Jets – Game summary

Quarter	1	2	3	4	OT	Total
Patriots	14	7	0	6	0	27
Jets	7	3	17	0	3	30

at MetLife Stadium, East Rutherford, New Jersey

- Date: October 20
- Game time: 1:00 p.m. EDT
- Game weather: 63 °F (17 °C), sunny
- Game attendance: 76,957
- Referee: Jerome Boger
- TV announcers (CBS): Greg Gumbel (play-by-play) and Dan Dierdorf (color commentator)
- Recap, Gamebook

Game information

First quarter

- NYJ– 9:43 Jeremy Kerley 12-yard pass from Geno Smith (Nick Folk kick.) 12 plays, 90 yards, 5:17 (NYJ 7-0)
- NE– 5:58 Brandon Bolden 1-yard run (Stephen Gostkowski kick.) 10 plays, 80 yards, 3:45 (Tied 7-7)
- NE– 1:32 Logan Ryan 79-yard interception return (Stephen Gostkowski kick.) (NE 14-7)

Second quarter

- NYJ– 11:11 Nick Folk 37-yard FG 12 plays, 61 yards, 5:21 (NE 14-10)
- NE– 5:15 Stevan Ridley 17-yard run (Stephen Gostkowski kick.) 6 plays, 28 yards, 2:34 (NE 21-10)

Third quarter

- NYJ– 14:27 Antonio Allen 21-yard interception return (Nick Folk kick.) (NE 21-17)
- NYJ– 4:33 Geno Smith 8-yard run (Nick Folk kick.) 8 plays, 52 yards, 3:36 (NYJ 24-21)
- NYJ– 1:30 Nick Folk 37-yard field goal 5 plays, 19 yards, 1:31 (NYJ 27-21)

Fourth quarter

- NE– 12:58 Stephen Gostkowski 39-yard field goal 10 plays, 62 yards, 3:32 (NYJ 27-24)
- NE– 0:16 Stephen Gostkowski 44-yard field goal 12 plays, 66 yards, 1:54 (Tied 27-27)

Overtime

- NYJ– 5:07 Nick Folk 42-yard field goal 14 plays, 56 yards, 8:48 (NYJ 30-27)

Top passers

- NE – Tom Brady – 22/46, 228 yards, INT
- NYJ – Geno Smith – 17/33, 233 yards, TD, INT

Top rushers

- NE – Stevan Ridley – 11 carries, 50 yards, TD
- NYJ – Chris Ivory – 34 carries, 104 yards

Top receivers

- NE – Rob Gronkowski – 8 receptions, 114 yards
- NYJ – Jeremy Kerley – 8 receptions, 97 yards, TD

Top tacklers

- NE – Chandler Jones, Dont'a Hightower, and Brandon Spikes – 11 tackles
- NYJ – Antonio Allen and Demario Davis – 9 tackles

The Patriots played the Jets for the second time this season, with Rob Gronkowski making his first appearance of the season.

The Jets put together a 12 play, 90-yard march on their opening drive, scoring on Smith's 12-yard touchdown pass to Kerley for an early 7–0 lead. The Patriots countered though, racing 80 yards in 10 plays, scoring on a 1-yard touchdown run by Bolden to tie the game. The Jets drove to the Patriots 20 on their next drive, but Smith was intercepted by rookie Logan Ryan who returned it 79 yards for a touchdown. The Jets responded on their next drive, marching 61 yards to the Patriots 19, and Folk trimmed the deficit to 14–10 on a 37-yard field goal. After the next two drives ended in punts, a 38-yard return by Edelman set the Patriots up well at the Jets 28. Six plays later, Ridley scored on a 17-yard touchdown run, increasing the Patriots lead to 21–10. Neither team scored for the rest of the half and the Patriots led 21–10 at halftime. On the first play of the second half, Brady was sacked by Quinton Coples and just managed to recover his own fumble, but on the next play Brady was intercepted by Antonio Allen who returned it 23 yards for a touchdown, trimming the deficit to 21–17. Three possessions later, the Jets marched 52 yards in 8 plays, scoring on Smith's 8-yard touchdown run, giving the Jets a 24–21 lead. After another Patriots three-and-out, Josh Cribbs gave the Jets the ball at the Patriots 38 after a 21-yard return. The Jets drove to the Patriots 19 and settled for a 37-yard field goal by Folk, increasing the Jets lead to 27–21. The Patriots answered on their next drive, marching 62 yards to the Jets 21, with Gostkowski kicking a 39-yard field goal, trimming the deficit to 27-24 early in the fourth quarter. Three possessions later, the Patriots drove 66 yards to the Jets 26 and Gostkowski tied the game 27–27 on a 44-yard field goal with less than :20 seconds left in the fourth quarter. After a Patriots three-and-out, the Jets drove to the Patriots 38, but Folk missed a 56-yard field goal, giving the Patriots the ball back, but a controversial unsportsmanlike penalty was called on New England's Chris Jones for pushing his teammate into the offensive line, giving the Jets 15 yds and a first down. Nick Folk's second attempt at 42 yds didn't miss and the Jets won their first game against New England in three years.

==== Week 8: vs. Miami Dolphins ====
Week Eight: Miami Dolphins at New England Patriots – Game summary

Quarter	1	2	3	4	Total
Dolphins	7	10	0	0	17
Patriots	0	3	17	7	27

at Gillette Stadium, Foxborough, Massachusetts

- Date: October 27
- Game time: 1:00 p.m. EDT
- Game weather: 53 °F (12 °C), partly cloudy
- Game attendance: 68,756
- Referee: Walt Anderson
- TV announcers (CBS): Jim Nantz (play-by-play) and Phil Simms (color commentator)
- Recap, Game book

Game information

First quarter

- MIA– 6:32 Brandon Gibson 4-yard pass from Ryan Tannehill (Caleb Sturgis kick.) 11 plays, 40 yards, 5:42 (MIA 7-0)

Second quarter

- MIA– 9:55 Daniel Thomas 5-yard pass from Ryan Tannehill (Caleb Sturgis kick.) 10 plays, 60 yards, 4:31 (MIA 14-0)
- NE– 3:43 Stephen Gostkowski 34-yard FG 13 plays, 64 yards, 6:12 (MIA 14-3)
- MIA– 0:30 Caleb Sturgis 52-yard FG 8 plays, 46 yards, 3:13 (MIA 17-3)

Third quarter

- NE– 8:28 Aaron Dobson 18-yard pass from Tom Brady (Stephen Gostkowski kick.) 5 plays, 64 yards, 1:45 (MIA 17-10)
- NE– 6:42 Brandon Bolden 1-yard run (Stephen Gostkowski kick.) 3 plays, 13 yards, 1:01 (Tied 17-17)
- NE– 0:08 Stephen Gostkowski 48-yard FG 8 plays, 32 yards, 2:16 (NE 20-17)

Fourth quarter

- NE– 7:14 Stevan Ridley 3-yard run (Stephen Gostkowski kick.) 13 plays, 69 yards, 5:56 (NE 27-17)

Top passers

- MIA – Ryan Tannehill – 22/42, 192 yards, 2 TD, 2 INT
- NE – Tom Brady – 13/22, 116 yards, TD, INT

Top rushers

- MIA – Lamar Miller – 18 carries, 89 yards
- NE – Stevan Ridley – 14 carries, 79 yards, TD

Top receivers

- MIA – Mike Wallace – 3 receptions, 42 yards
- NE – Aaron Dobson – 4 receptions, 60 yards, TD

Top tacklers

- MIA – Dannell Ellerbe – 11 tackles
- NE – Dont'a Hightower – 10 tackles, 1.0 sacks

Miami dominated the first half, scoring 17 points as the Patriots looked ugly, struggling to gain any offense except for a field goal. Brady threw for only 25 yards in the first half (his fewest since 2003), and an interception only worsened his situation. It looked dangerously like New England would lose back to back division games for the first time since 2002. But the second half proved better, as Brady and the Patriots came out strong and scored 24 unanswered to win 27–17 thanks to Miami turnovers. Brady finished with just 116 passing yards while three Patriots backs combined for 147 rushing yards (Brady himself added five more).

==== Week 9: vs. Pittsburgh Steelers ====
Week Nine: Pittsburgh Steelers at New England Patriots – Game summary

Quarter	1	2	3	4	Total
Steelers	0	10	14	7	31
Patriots	7	17	3	28	55

at Gillette Stadium, Foxborough, Massachusetts

- Date: November 3
- Game time: 4:25 p.m. EST
- Game weather: 44 °F (7 °C), partly cloudy, cool and windy
- Game attendance: 68,756
- Referee: Walt Coleman
- TV announcers (CBS): Jim Nantz (play-by-play) and Phil Simms (color commentator)
- Recap, Gamebook

Game information

First quarter

- NE – 4:00 Danny Amendola 34-yard pass from Tom Brady (Stephen Gostkowski kick.) 1 play, 34 yards, 0:06 (NE 7-0)

Second quarter

- NE – 10:30 Rob Gronkowski 19-yard pass from Tom Brady (Stephen Gostkowski kick.) 6 plays, 63 yards, 2:06 (NE 14-0)
- PIT – 7:36 Shaun Suisham 30-yard FG 7 plays, 68 yards, 2:54 (NE 14-3)
- NE – 3:51 Stephen Gostkowski 20-yard FG 8 plays, 76 yards, 3:45 (NE 17-3)
- PIT – 1:55 Antonio Brown 27-yard pass from Ben Roethlisberger (Shaun Suisham kick.) 4 plays, 71 yards, 1:56 (NE 17-10)
- NE – 0:10 Stevan Ridley 1-yard run (Stephen Gostkowski kick.) 9 plays, 77 yards, 1:45 (NE 24-10)

Third quarter

- PIT – 11:02 Jerricho Cotchery 20-yard pass from Ben Roethlisberger (Shaun Suisham kick.) 5 plays, 26 yards, 1:54 (NE 24-17)
- PIT – 7:10 Jerricho Cotchery 8-yard pass from Ben Roethlisberger (Shaun Suisham kick.) 5 plays, 46 yards, 2:18 (Tied 24-24)
- NE – 2:39 Stephen Gostkowski 32-yard FG 11 plays, 60 yards, 4:31 (NE 27-24)

Fourth quarter

- NE – 13:46 Aaron Dobson 17-yard pass from Tom Brady (Stephen Gostkowski kick.) 5 plays, 34 yards, 1:38 (NE 34-24)
- NE – 9:16 Stevan Ridley 5-yard run (Stephen Gostkowski kick.) 8 plays, 61 yards, 3:28 (NE 41-24)
- PIT – 6:15 Jerricho Cotchery 6-yard pass from Ben Roethlisberger (Shaun Suisham kick.) 10 plays, 80 yards, 3:01 (NE 41-31)
- NE – 5:15 Aaron Dobson 81-yard pass from Tom Brady (Stephen Gostkowski kick.) 2 plays, 93 yards, 1:00 (NE 48-31)
- NE – 2:41 LeGarrette Blount 5-yard run (Stephen Gostkowski kick.) 2 plays, 28 yards, 0:38 (NE 55-31)

Top passers

- PIT – Ben Roethlisberger – 28/48, 400 yards, 4 TD, 2 INT
- NE – Tom Brady – 23/33, 432 yards, 4 TD

Top rushers

- PIT – Le'Veon Bell – 16 carries, 74 yards
- NE – Stevan Ridley – 26 carries, 115 yards, 2 TD

Top receivers

- PIT – Emmanuel Sanders – 6 receptions, 98 yards
- NE – Rob Gronkowski - 9 receptions, 143 yards, TD

Top tacklers

- PIT – Lawrence Timmons - 11 tackles
- NE – Chandler Jones - 6 tackles, 2.0 sacks

Four plays into the Steelers opening drive, Ben Roethlisberger was strip-sacked by Ninkovich with Joe Vellano recovering at the Patriots 42. However, the Patriots were forced to a three-and-out. Two possessions later, The Patriots marched all the way to the Steelers 1, but Ridley was tackled for no gain on 4th-and-Goal. After a false start penalty on Marcus Gilbert, Roethlisberger was intercepted at the Steelers 34 by McCourty. On the first play, Brady hit Amendola for a touchdown, giving the Patriots a 7–0 lead. Pittsburgh responded by driving to the Patriots 32, but on 4th-and-1 Le'Veon Bell was tackled for a 1-yard loss. The Patriots made Pittsburgh pay, racing 63 yards in 6 plays, scoring on Brady's 19-yard touchdown pass to Gronkowski, increasing the lead to 14–0. With the catch, Gronk already reached 100 yards, making this his 11th career 100 yard receiving game, extending his record for Patriots' tight ends. The Steelers drove to the Patriots 12, but settled for a 30-yard field goal by Shaun Suisham, trimming the deficit to 14–3. The Patriots answered with a field goal, as well. Driving all the way to the Steelers 3, but settled for Gostkowski's 21-yard field goal, making the score 17–3. The Steelers put a dent in the Patriots lead on their next drive, racing 71 yards in less than two minutes, scoring on Ben's 27-yard touchdown pass to Antonio Brown, making the score 17–10. The Patriots countered, though, racing 77 yards in under two minutes, too, scoring on Ridley's 1-yard touchdown run, giving the Patriots a 24–10 lead at halftime. On the fifth play of the first drive of the second half, Ridley was stripped by Troy Polamalu with LaMarr Woodley recovering at the Patriots 36. Five plays later, Ben hit Jerricho Cotchery for a 20-yard touchdown, trimming the deficit to 24–17. After a Patriots three-and-out, aided by a 24-yard return by Brown to the Patriots 46, the Steelers raced 46 yards in 5 plays, scoring on Ben's 8-yard touchdown pass to Cotchery, tying the game 24-24. The Patriots drove to the Steelers 5 on their next drive, but on 3rd-and-3, Brady was sacked for a 9-yard loss by Jason Worilds, and Gostkowski kicked a 32-yard field goal, giving the Patriots a 27–24 lead. After a Steelers punt, the Patriots started to take over. Edelman returned the punt 43 yards to the Steelers 34. The Patriots proceeded to race 34 yards in 1:38, scoring on Brady's 17-yard touchdown pass to Dobson, increasing the lead to 34–24. After a Steelers punt, the Patriots drove 61 yards in 8 plays, scoring on Ridley's 5-yard touchdown run, widening the lead to 41–24. Earlier on the drive, Ridley ran for 7 yards, making this his 5th-career 100-yard rushing game. The Steelers countered on their next drive, storming 80 yards in 10 plays, scoring Cotchery's third touchdown reception, trimming the deficit to 41–31. However, the Patriots were unstoppable. On the second play of the drive, after a 12-yard run by Blount, Brady hit Dobson for an 81-yard touchdown bomb, widening the lead to 48-31 late in the fourth quarter. This was Brady's 3rd career 400-yard game, moving him to 7th on the all-time passing list with 47,062 career passing yards, passing Fran Tarkenton. This was his 37th career game with 3 touchdown passes. This was Dobson's 1st career 100-yard receiving game. The Steelers reached their own 48 on their next drive, but Harmon intercepted Ben at the Patriots 30 and returned it 42 yards to the Steelers 28. The drive lasted only two plays: a Blount 23-yard run and a Blount 5-yard run for a touchdown, putting the game away 55–31. The Steelers drove to the Patriots 39, but turned the ball over on downs. Brady took a knee to end the game.

New England posted its biggest single-game offensive output of the season to date, and the third highest in team history (630 yards) as the Patriots offense finally clicked in what amounted to a blowout win over the struggling Steelers. Brady threw for 432 yards and four touchdowns, while Aaron Dobson, Danny Amendola and Rob Gronkowski combined for 395 yards and four touchdowns. Ridley also had over 100 yds rushing and two touchdowns despite a third-quarter fumble. Ben Roethlisberger threw for 400 yds and 4 TDs as well, but also threw 2 interceptions. The 55 points was the most scored against the Steelers in team history.

==== Week 11: at Carolina Panthers ====
Week Eleven: New England Patriots at Carolina Panthers – Game summary

Quarter	1	2	3	4	Total
Patriots	0	3	7	10	20
Panthers	7	3	7	7	24

at Bank of America Stadium, Charlotte, North Carolina

- Date: November 18
- Game time: 8:40 p.m. EST
- Game weather: 59 °F (15 °C), cloudy
- Game attendance: 74,225
- Referee: Clete Blakeman
- TV announcers (ESPN): Mike Tirico (play-by-play), Jon Gruden (color commentator) and Lisa Salters (sideline reporter)
- Recap, Gamebook

Game information

First quarter

- CAR – 2:44 Brandon Lafell 9-yard pass from Cam Newton (Graham Gano kick.) 9 plays, 75 yards, 5:03 (CAR 7-0)

Second quarter

- CAR – 5:02 Graham Gano 43-yard FG 12 plays, 63 yards, 6:01 (CAR 10-0)
- NE – 1:09 Stephen Gostkowski 42-yard FG 9 plays, 46 yards, 3:53 (CAR 10-3)

Third quarter

- NE – 10:31 Rob Gronkowski 9-yard pass from Tom Brady (Stephen Gostkowski kick.) 8 plays, 82 yards, 4:29 (Tied 10-10)
- CAR – 2:10 Greg Olsen 15-yard pass from Cam Newton (Graham Gano kick) 13 plays, 81 yards, 8:21 (CAR 17-10)

Fourth quarter

- NE – 12:33 Stevan Ridley 1-yard run (Stephen Gostkowski kick.) 9 plays, 80 yards, 4:37 (Tied 17-17)
- NE – 6:32 Stephen Gostkowski 26-yard FG 9 plays, 30 yards, 4:29 (NE 20-17)
- CAR – 0:59 Ted Ginn Jr. 25-yard pass from Cam Newton (Graham Gano kick.) 13 plays, 83 yards, 5:33 (CAR 24-20)

Top passers

- NE – Tom Brady – 29/40, 283 yards, TD, INT
- CAR – Cam Newton 19/28, 209 yards, 3 TD

Top rushers

- NE – LeGarrette Blount – 10 carries, 49 yards
- CAR – Cam Newton – 7 carries, 62 yards

Top receivers

- NE – Shane Vereen – 8 receptions, 65 yards
- CAR – Brandon LaFell – 7 receptions, 59 yards, TD

Top tacklers

- NE – Rob Ninkovich – 9 tackles, 6 solo, 2.0 sacks
- CAR – Thomas Davis – 17 tackles, 10 solo

Ten years after their most famous meeting, the Patriots and Panthers battled back and forth on an exciting edition of Monday Night Football. After both teams punted on their opening drive, the Panthers stormed 75 yards in just 9 plays. On 3rd-and-3 at the Patriots 34, Cam Newton threw an incomplete pass, but Aqib Talib was flagged for unnecessary roughness. This moved the ball to the 19 and gave Carolina a new set of downs. A few plays later, Newton hit eventual Patriot Brandon LaFell for a 9-yard touchdown. The Patriots responded by driving to the 13-yard line of Carolina, but Stevan Ridley fumbled after being tackled by Kawann Short with Mario Addison recovering for Carolina. The Patriots had taken 6:41 off the clock, but had come away with zero points. Carolina responded by driving 63 yards to the Patriots 25-yard line, taking 6:01 off the clock, and Graham Gano drilled a 42-yard field goal, extending the lead to 10–0 with only 5:02 remaining in the half. The Patriots drove 42 yards to the Carolina 24, but Carolina's stout defense held the Patriots to only a field goal as Gostkowski drained a 42-year field goal with 1:09 remaining in the half. Carolina ran out the clock going to the locker room up 10–3, but Brady led New England back on another second-half comeback. The Patriots took the opening drive of the half for a touchdown marching 82 yards in only 8 plays with Brady throwing a short pass to Rob Gronkowski who carried three Carolina defenders into the end zone for a 9-yard touchdown, tying the score at 10-10. The Panthers responded immediately with an amazing 13 play, 81-yard drive, including 3 3rd-down conversions. On 3rd-and-7 at the Carolina 37, Cam Newton beat the Patriots blitz with a 14-yard scramble. Later on 3rd-and-1 at the Patriots 40, Mike Tolbert ran for 2 yards and finally, on 3rd-and-4 at the Patriots 15, Newton connected with Greg Olsen for a 15-yard touchdown retaking the lead 17–10. The Patriots answered right back driving 80 yards using only 9 plays with Ridley redeeming himself with a 1-yard touchdown run tying the game at 17-17. After a Panthers three-and-out the Patriots drove 30 yards to the Panthers 8-yard line, but the Panthers defense stood strong and held the Patriots to a 26-yard Gostkowski field goal, giving the Patriots their lead at 20–17 with 6:32 remaining in the game. However, Cam Newton led the Panthers down the field on a 13 play, 83-yard drive that took 5:33 off the clock and retook the lead at 24–20 with only :59 seconds left. Once again the Panthers converted 3 3rd-downs. On 3rd-and-6 at the Carolina 21, Newton ran for 15 yards. On 3rd-and-2 at the Carolina 44, Newton ran for 3 more yards. Finally, on 3rd-and-7 at the Patriots 36, Devin McCourty was flagged for a questionable pass interference on Greg Olsen. Newton finished the drive with a 25-yard touchdown pass to Ted Ginn Jr. on 2nd-and-15. On the Patriots final drive, Brady threw three straight incompletions to start the drive. On 4th-and-10, Brady connected with Gronkowski for 23 yards to the Patriots 43. After an incomplete pass, Brady fired an 11-yard pass to Danny Amendola to the Panthers 46. Four plays later Brady threw an incomplete pass intended for Aaron Dobson on 3rd-and-10, but Melvin White was called for pass interference, moving the ball to the Panthers 36. A 7-yard completion to Dobson an 11-yard completion to Shane Vereen moved the ball to the 18-yard line with :03 seconds left. On the last play Brady threw a pass to Rob Gronkowski, but was intercepted in the end zone by Robert Lester. However, yet another controversial call by the referees decided the outcome of the game, as the Panther's Luke Kuechly was called for pass interference on Gronkowski, but the flag was picked up and announced there was no foul due to the ball being "uncatchable", nullifying the penalty and resulting in end of the game. However, after the game ended, media sources debated the ruling on the field, and it was the opinion of many that the call was incorrect and the Patriots were robbed of a chance to win the game.

==== Week 12: vs. Denver Broncos ====
Week Twelve: Denver Broncos at New England Patriots – Game summary

Quarter	1	2	3	4	OT	Total
Broncos	17	7	0	7	0	31
Patriots	0	0	21	10	3	34

at Gillette Stadium, Foxborough, Massachusetts

- Date: November 24
- Game time: 8:30 p.m. EST
- Game weather: 22 °F (−6 °C), clear, windy and cold
- Game attendance: 68,756
- Referee: Gene Steratore
- TV announcers (NBC): Al Michaels (play-by-play), Cris Collinsworth (color commentator) and Michele Tafoya (sideline reporter)
- Recap, Gamebook

Game information

First quarter

- DEN – 9:54 Von Miller 60-yard fumble return for a TD, Matt Prater kick. (DEN 7–0)
- DEN – 8:54 Knowshon Moreno 2-yard TD run, Matt Prater kick. Drive: 2 plays, 10 yards, 0:28. (DEN 14–0)
- DEN – 2:57 Matt Prater 27-yard FG. Drive: 10 plays, 35 yards, 4:29. (DEN 17–0)

Second quarter

- DEN – 6:10 Jacob Tamme 10-yard TD pass from Peyton Manning, Matt Prater kick. Drive: 11 plays, 70 yards, 4:28. (DEN 24–0)

Third quarter

- NE – 11:21 Julian Edelman 5-yard TD pass from Tom Brady, Stephen Gostkowski kick. Drive: 8 plays, 80 yards, 3:39. (DEN 24–7)
- NE – 5:40 Brandon Bolden 1-yard TD run, Stephen Gostkowski kick. Drive: 6 plays, 32 yards, 2:39. (DEN 24–14)
- NE – 0:19 Rob Gronkowski 6-yard TD pass from Tom Brady, Stephen Gostkowski kick. Drive: 5 plays, 65 yards, 1:42. (DEN 24–21)

Fourth quarter

- NE – 13:13 Julian Edelman 14-yard TD pass from Tom Brady, Stephen Gostkowski kick. Drive: 3 plays, 30 yards, 1:19. (NE 28–24)
- NE – 7:37 Stephen Gostkowski 31-yard FG. Drive: 12 plays, 34 yards, 4:45. (NE 31–24)
- DEN – 3:06 Demaryius Thomas 11-yard TD pass from Peyton Manning, Matt Prater kick. Drive: 10 plays, 80 yards, 4:31. (tied 31–31)

Overtime

- NE – 1:56 Stephen Gostkowski 31-yard FG. Drive: 3 plays, 1:05. (NE 34–31)

Top passers

- DEN – Peyton Manning – 19/36, 150 yards, 2 TD, 1 INT
- NE – Tom Brady – 34/50, 344 yards, 3 TD

Top rushers

- DEN – Knowshon Moreno – 37 rushes, 224 yards, 1 TD
- NE – Brandon Bolden – 13 rushes, 58 yards, 1 TD

Top receivers

- DEN – Jacob Tamme – 5 receptions, 47 yards, 1 TD
- NE – Julian Edelman – 9 receptions, 110 yards, 2 TD

Top tacklers

- DEN – Wesley Woodyard – 7 tackles, 8 assists, 1 forced fumble
- NE – Duron Harmon – 7 tackles, 4 assists

In the 14th installment of the Brady-Manning Rivalry, the Patriots and Broncos battled in one of the most exciting editions of NBC Sunday Night Football in recent memory. The expected shootout between two potent offenses did not occur at the start of the game, as three New England turnovers on their first three drives of the game gave the Broncos a 17–0 lead in the 1st quarter. It was looking to be one of the most embarrassing performances in Patriot history as an additional touchdown gave Manning and the Broncos a 24–0 lead at the half. However, Brady and the Patriots were not going to let the Broncos run away with a blowout victory at Gillette. They regrouped in the locker room and came out to score 31 unanswered points, scoring on five straight drives out of the half, helped by three Denver turnovers of their own. The two halves were complete polar opposites, each displaying offensive domination on one side and defensive struggles on the other, flipping 180˚ at the half. However, the Broncos managed to tie the game at 31 late in the 4th, eventually sending the game to overtime; during the tying drive Manning was intercepted by Aqib Talib but the pick was overturned on a pass interference penalty on Talib.

The Patriots won the coin toss, but surprisingly elected to defend first, hoping to stop the Broncos from scoring and to take advantage of the wind for a potential game-winning field goal. This was exactly what happened, as the two teams traded punts twice, but on New England's second punt, Broncos cornerback Tony Carter ran into the punt, and Patriots' Nate Ebner recovered the ball on the Broncos' 20 yard line, setting up Gostkowski's game winning 31-yard field goal. The 24 point deficit was the largest comeback in Brady's and the Patriots' history, and gave Brady his 10th win in 14 meetings over Manning-led teams. Brady threw for 344 yard and 3 TD's in the contest, and WR Julian Edelman had a career day with 110 receiving yards for two scores.

The win from down 24 points was the largest comeback win in Patriots history, surpassing 1984's comeback from down 23–0 against the Seahawks. The Patriots would break this comeback record three years later in Super Bowl LI.

==== Week 13: at Houston Texans ====
Week Thirteen: New England Patriots at Houston Texans – Game summary

Quarter	1	2	3	4	Total
Patriots	7	0	14	13	34
Texans	10	7	7	7	31

at Reliant Stadium, Houston, Texas

- Date: December 1
- Game time: 1:00 p.m. EST/12:00 p.m. CST
- Game weather: 64 °F (18 °C), mostly cloudy (retractable roof open)
- Game attendance: 71,769
- Referee: Pete Morelli
- TV announcers (CBS): Greg Gumbel (play-by-play) and Dan Dierdorf (color commentator)
- Recap, Gamebook

Game information

First quarter

- HOU- 8:44 Ben Tate 8 yard run (Randy Bullock kick) 5 plays, 53 yards, 2:04 (HOU 7-0)
- HOU- 4:10 Randy Bullock 43-yard field goal 4 plays, 6 yards, 1:32 (HOU 10-0)
- NE- Rob Gronkowski 23-yard pass from Tom Brady (Stephen Gostkowski kick) 6 plays, 55 yards, 2:45 (HOU 17-7)

Second quarter

Third quarter

Fourth quarter

Top passers

- NE – Tom Brady – 29/41, 371 yards, 2 TD, INT
- HOU – Case Keenum – 15/30, 272 yards, INT

Top rushers

- NE – LeGarrette Blount – 12 carries, 44 yards, TD
- HOU – Ben Tate – 22 carries, 102 yards, 3 TD

Top receivers

- NE – Julian Edelman – 9 receptions, 101 yards
- HOU – Andre Johnson – 8 receptions, 121 yards

Top tacklers

- NE – Dont'a Hightower – 7 tackles, 5 solo
- HOU – Darryl Sharpton – 9 tackles, 6 solo

New England escaped Houston with a win as the Patriots and the Texans battled in a closely fought game a week after coming back to win against the Denver Broncos. After both teams punted on their opening drive Houston opened up the game by scoring the first points of the game on a touchdown. After a 2-yard run by Ben Tate, Case Keenum hit Andre Johnson on back-to-back completions for 42 yards, moving the ball to the Patriots 8. Tate scored on a touchdown run on the very next play for the early 7–0 lead as the Patriots continued their trend of falling behind early. On the Patriots next drive they reached their own 49-yard line, but Tom Brady was intercepted by Jonathan Joseph on an underthrown ball intended for Rob Gronkowski. After an incomplete pass attempt to Andre Johnson, tight end Garrett Graham was called for a crucial offensive pass interference penalty, moving the ball 10 yards back to the 41. They managed to reach the 25, but were four yards short of a first down and they settled for a Randy Bullock 43-yard field goal. New England answered with a touchdown on their next drive, moving 55 yards in just 6 plays with Brady hitting Gronkowski for a 23-yard touchdown pass. to trim the score to 10–7. The Texans reached the Patriots 27 on their next drive, but Case Keenum was intercepted by safety Logan Ryan. The Patriots drove from their own 20 to the Texans 37, but Stephen Gostkowski missed a 55-yard field goal. The Texans stormed 55 yards in just 7 plays to take the lead 17–7, scoring on Ben Tate's 20-yard touchdown run with 1:52 remaining in the half. The Patriots punted and the Texans ran out the clock as the game went to halftime at 17–7. Again continuing a trend, Brady and the Pats came out of the locker room hot. The Patriots marched 55 yards using 7 plays with the big play being a Tom Brady connection to Rob Gronkowski for 50 yards moving the ball from the Patriots 37 to the Texans 13. A 12-yard pass moved the ball to the 1 where fullback James Develin ran it in for the touchdown, trimming the deficit to 17–14. Houston went three-and-out on their next possession and the Patriots struck for another touchdown. This time they moved the ball 73 yards in merely 7 plays with Brady darting a 7-yard touchdown pass to Shane Vereen to take their first lead at 21–17. However, the Texans immediately countered by storming 81 yards, taking 10 plays and chewing up 5:55 and culminating with Case Keenum scrambling for a 5-yard touchdown, retaking the lead at 24–21. Like the Texans, the Patriots immediately countered, storming 81 yards again, this time taking only 7 plays with LeGarrette Blount rushing for a 7-yard touchdown with 13:09 remaining in the game. Once again though, the Texans answered going 80 yards in just 3 plays to retake the lead 31–28. On the drive a 66-yard completion to DeAndre Hopkins moved the ball to the Patriots 14. Two plays later, Ben Tate ran in a 10-yard touchdown. The Patriots took the ball and drove 40 yards in 9 plays to the Texans 35-yard line and Gostkowski connected on a 53-yard field goal. The Texans went three-and-out giving the Patriots the ball with a chance to take the lead. They drove to the Texans 35-yard line in 7 plays where Gostkowski drilled another clutch 53-yard field goal to give the Patriots a 34–31 lead with 3:12 remaining in the game. The Texans reached their own 43, but consecutive incomplete passes on 3rd and 4th down gave the ball to the Patriots. The Texans forced a punt, however, giving them one last chance to win or tie and force overtime. Unfortunately for the Texans, they couldn't move the ball and an incompletion as time expired gave the Patriots the win. The win marks the 9th on the year for the Patriots, ensuring their 13th winning season in a row, and ended a 3-game road losing streak. The loss puts the Texans at 2–10, easily their worst season since 2005.

This marked the Patriots' only game outside of the Eastern Time Zone during the 2013 regular season (the Patriots would go on to play the AFC Championship game in the Mountain Time Zone at Denver).

==== Week 14: vs. Cleveland Browns ====
Week Fourteen: Cleveland Browns at New England Patriots – Game summary

Quarter	1	2	3	4	Total
Browns	3	3	13	7	26
Patriots	0	0	11	16	27

at Gillette Stadium, Foxborough, Massachusetts

- Date: December 8
- Game time: 1:00 p.m. EST
- Game weather: 30 °F (−1 °C), cloudy and cold
- Game attendance: 68,756
- Referee: Jerome Boger
- TV announcers (CBS): Don Criqui (play-by-play) and Steve Tasker (color commentator)
- Recap, Gamebook

Game information

First quarter

- CLE (9:23) – Billy Cundiff 43 yd field goal
  Browns 3, Patriots 0 Drive: 10 plays, 47 yds, 5:42

Second quarter

- CLE (14:50) – Billy Cundiff 37 yd field goal
  Browns 6, Patriots 0 Drive: 9 plays, 37 yds, 3:46

Third quarter

- CLE (10:15) – Gary Barnidge 40 yd pass from Jason Campbell (run failed)
  Browns 12, Patriots 0 Drive: 5 plays, 73 yds, 1:54
- NE (1:37) – Stephen Gostkowski 33 yd field goal
  Browns 12, Patriots 3 Drive: 11 plays, 68 yds, 3:46
- CLE (1:25) – Josh Gordon 80 yd pass from Jason Campbell (Billy Cundiff kick)
  Browns 19, Patriots 3 Drive: 1 play, 80 yds, 0:12
- NE (0:06) – Shane Vereen 6 yd run (Tom Brady pass to Julian Edelman)
  Browns 19, Patriots 11 Drive: 3 plays, 72 yds, 1:19

Fourth quarter

- NE (5:43) – Stephen Gostkowski 50 yd field goal
  Browns 19, Patriots 14 Drive: 12 plays, 49 yds, 5:48
- CLE (2:39) – Jordan Cameron 4 yd pass from Jason Campbell (Billy Cundiff kick)
  Browns 26, Patriots 14 Drive: 8 plays, 80 yds, 3:04
- NE (1:01) – Julian Edelman 2 yd pass from Tom Brady (Stephen Gostkowski kick)
  Browns 26, Patriots 21 Drive: 11 plays, 82 yds, 1:38
- NE (0:31) – Danny Amendola 1 yd pass from (Tom Brady) (run failed)
  Patriots 27, Browns 26 Drive: 2 plays, 40 yds, 0:30

Top passers

- CLE – Jason Campbell – 29/44, 391 yds, 3 TD
- NE – Tom Brady – 32/52, 418 yds, 2 TD, INT

Top rushers

- CLE – Josh Gordon – 1 carr, 34 yds
- NE – LeGarrette Blount – 8 carr, 42 yds

Top receivers

- CLE – Josh Gordon – 7 rec, 151 yds, TD
- NE – Shane Vereen – 12 rec, 153 yds

Top tacklers

- CLE – D'Qwell Jackson – 9 tackles, 1 INT
- NE – Dont'a Hightower – 11 tackles

The Patriots won their third straight come-from-behind victory on a thrilling finish in Foxboro. The Browns took the opening kickoff and marched 47 yards in 10 plays to the New England 25-yard line where Billy Cundiff converted on a 43-yard field goal attempt. After both teams punted on their next possession, Tom Brady was intercepted by D'Qwell Jackson on a pass intended for Josh Boyce. The driving Browns appeared primed for a touchdown, but a penalty and an incomplete pass forced them to settle for Cundiff's 37-yard field goal increasing the lead to 6–0. It was all punts for the rest of the half as the Browns lead 6–0 at halftime. After the Patriots first drive of the half ended in a punt, the Browns stormed 73 yards using only 5 plays with Jason Campbell bombing a 40-yard touchdown pass to Gary Barnidge, the missed two-point conversion kept the score, 12–0. On the Patriots next drive, Tom Brady was strip-sacked by Paul Kruger and the Browns recovered. To make matters worse, Rob Gronkowski tore his ACL earlier on the drive, ending his season. Brady led a touchdown scoring drive to put them within five points with 61 seconds remaining. The Patriots successfully recovered their onside kick attempt for the first time in team history since 1995, also against the Browns, who ironically were coached by Bill Belichick that year. On the ensuing New England drive, the Browns took a pass interference penalty in the endzone to give the Patriots a 1st and goal. New England took the 27–26 lead on a 1-yard pass by Brady to Amendola with 31 seconds left. After failing to convert on the 2 point play, the Browns attempted to get into field goal range for the win. With 1 second remaining, Billy Cundiff attempted a 58-yard field goal but fell short of the uprights, giving the Patriots their 10th win of the season, and their 11th straight 10 win season.

==== Week 15: at Miami Dolphins ====
Week Fifteen: New England Patriots at Miami Dolphins – Game summary

Quarter	1	2	3	4	Total
Patriots	3	7	0	10	20
Dolphins	0	7	3	14	24

at Sun Life Stadium, Miami Gardens, Florida

- Date: December 15
- Game time: 1:00 p.m. EST
- Game weather: 84 °F (29 °C), partly cloudy
- Game attendance: 71,863
- Referee: Tony Corrente
- TV announcers (CBS): Jim Nantz (play-by-play) and Phil Simms (color commentator)
- Recap, Game book

Game information

First quarter

Second quarter

Third quarter

Fourth quarter

Top passers

- NE –
- MIA –

Top rushers

- NE –
- MIA –

Top receivers

- NE –
- MIA –

Top tacklers

- NE –
- MIA –

The Patriots traveled to Miami to face the Dolphins, looking to clinch the AFC East, playing their first game without Gronkowski since Week 6 vs the Saints.

After a Dolphins punt, the Patriots marched 83 yards to the Dolphins 4 on their opening drive, which took half of the quarter, but ended with a Gostkowski field goal. The next four drives of the game ended in punts. Midway through the second quarter, the Dolphins reached the Patriots 24. However, John Denney fumbled the snap and Nate Ebner recovered at the Patriots 31. The Patriots stormed 69 yards, scoring on Brady's 13-yard touchdown pass to Michael Hoomanawanui, increasing the lead to 10–0. The Dolphins got on the board on their next drive, racing 82 yards in just over a minutes, with Tannehill bombing a 39-yard touchdown pass to Wallace, making the score 10-7 Patriots at halftime. The Patriots drove all the way to the Dolphins 20 on their next drive, but Gostkowski missed a 38-yard field goal. The Dolphins managed to drive all the way to the Patriots 14, but could only chalk up a 32-yard field goal, tying the game 10-10. After a Patriots punt, the Dolphins strung together a 10 play, 66-yard drive, scoring on a 2-yard touchdown pass to Daniel Thomas, giving the Dolphins a 17–10 lead a few plays into the fourth quarter. The Patriots responded by driving all the way to the Dolphins 5-yard line, but were forced to settle for a 23-yard field goal, trimming the deficit to 17–13. After a Dolphins punt, the Patriots raced 73 yards in just 6 plays, scoring on Brady's 24-yard touchdown pass to Edelman, giving the Patriots a 20–17 lead with just 4:07 remaining in the fourth quarter. However, Gostkowski booted the ensuing kickoff out of bounds, giving the Dolphins the ball at their own 40. Facing a 3rd-and-16 at their own 34, Tannehill hit Brian Hartline for an 11-yard gain, then on 4th-and-5, Tannehill hit Charles Clay for a 6-yard gain and a first-down. Five plays later, Tannehill hit Marcus Thigpen for a 14-yard touchdown, giving the Dolphins a 24–20 lead with 1:15 remaining in the game. Facing a 4th-and-8 at their own 33, Brady hit Amendola for a 12-yard gain. Four plays later, Brady converted at 3rd-and-10 with a 12-yard screen pass to Edelman to the Dolphins 19. Four plays later, facing a 4th-and-5 at the Dolphins 14, Brady was intercepted in the end zone by Michael Thomas with 0:02 seconds left. Tannehill took a knee and the Dolphins won the game.

Miami's victory was their first over the Patriots since 2009, having lost the last seven games in the division rivalry.

==== Week 16: at Baltimore Ravens ====
Week Sixteen: New England Patriots at Baltimore Ravens – Game summary

Quarter	1	2	3	4	Total
Patriots	14	3	3	21	41
Ravens	0	0	0	7	7

at M&T Bank Stadium, Baltimore, Maryland

- Date: December 22
- Game time: 4:25 p.m. EST
- Game weather: 65 °F (18 °C), cloudy
- Game attendance: 71,433
- Referee: Ron Winter
- TV announcers (CBS): Jim Nantz (play-by-play) and Phil Simms (color commentator)
- Recap, Gamebook

Game information

First quarter

- NE – LeGarrette Blount 1-Yard Run, 9:39 (NE 7–0)
- NE – Shane Vereen 4-Yard Pass from Tom Brady, 4:51 (NE 14–0)

Second quarter

- NE – Stephen Gostkowski 45 Yard FG, 14:55 (NE 17–0)

Third quarter

- NE – Stephen Gostkowski 42 Yard FG, 7:15 (NE 20–0)

Fourth quarter

- BAL – Joe Flacco 1 Yard Run, 9:21 (NE 20–7)
- NE – LeGarrette Blount 7 Yard Run, 2:05 (NE 27–7)
- NE – Chandler Jones Fumble Recovery, 1:59 (NE 34–7)
- NE – Tavon Wilson intercepts Tyrod Taylor for 74 Yards, 0:40 (NE 41–7)

Top passers

- NE – Tom Brady (14–26, 172 yards, 1 TD, 0 INT)
- BAL – Joe Flacco (22–38, 260 yards, 0 TD, 2 INT)

Top rushers

- NE – LeGarrette Blount (16 rushes, 76 yards, 2 TD)
- BAL – Ray Rice (11 rushes, 40 yards, 0 TD)

Top receivers

- NE – Julian Edelman (7 rec, 77 yards, 0 TD)
- BAL – Torrey Smith (3 rec, 69 yards, 0 TD)

Top tacklers

- NE – Kyle Arrington (10)
- BAL – Daryl Smith (11)

Before the start of the game, the Patriots clinched the AFC East for the 5th straight year with Miami's 0–19 loss to Buffalo.

The Patriots played arguably their best all-around game of the year in a 41–7 domination of the Ravens. New England's defense was superb, forcing three fourth down turnovers, three interceptions and a missed field goal, while only allowing one touchdown as Joe Flacco struggled while playing with an MCL sprain. Brady led the Patriots to an early 14–0 lead and never looked back. After New England took a 27–7 lead late in the 4th quarter, Baltimore gave up two defensive scores in the final two minutes to lose by 34 points, the largest losing margin the Ravens have ever had at home.

==== Week 17: vs. Buffalo Bills ====
Week Seventeen: Buffalo Bills at New England Patriots – Game summary

Quarter	1	2	3	4	Total
Bills	3	0	7	10	20
Patriots	6	10	0	18	34

at Gillette Stadium, Foxborough, Massachusetts

- Date: December 29
- Game time: 4:25 p.m. EST
- Game weather: 39 °F (4 °C), rain
- Game attendance: 68,756
- Referee: Ed Hochuli
- TV announcers (CBS): Ian Eagle (play-by-play) and Dan Fouts (color commentator)
- Recap, Gamebook

Game information

First quarter

Second quarter

Third quarter

Fourth quarter

Top passers

- BUF – Thaddeus Lewis - 16/29, 247 yards, 1 TD
- NE – Tom Brady - 14/24, 122 yards, 1 TD, 1 INT

Top rushers

- BUF – C. J. Spiller - 19 carries, 105 yards
- NE – LeGarrette Blount - 24 carries, 189 yards, 2 TDs

Top receivers

- BUF – T. J. Graham - 3 receptions, 62 yards, 1 TD
- NE – Julian Edelman - 9 receptions, 65 yards

Top tacklers

- BUF – Kiko Alonso - 14 tackles
- NE – Sealver Siliga - 9 tackles, 1 sack

The Patriots earned their 4th straight first-round bye and the AFC's second seed with a 34–20 win over the Bills in the 108th meeting of the rivalry. New England dominated the first half, taking a 16–3 lead into the locker room. Buffalo would score 17 points to keep it a close contest but could not overcome the Patriots defense enough to take the lead, as New England forced three fourth-down turnovers for the second straight week. Julian Edelman became the 3rd player in New England history to make 100 receptions for 1,000 yards on the season. Stephen Gostkowski broke his own team record for field goals made by kicking his 38th of the year. The story of the game though was LeGarrette Blount, who had a career day, rushing for 189 yards and two touchdowns, and added 145 yards on two kickoff returns for a total of 334 all-purpose yards on the day.

== Final standings ==
=== Division ===
AFC East
	W	L	T	PCT	DIV	CONF	PF	PA	STK
^{(2)} New England Patriots	12	4	0	.750	4–2	9–3	444	338	W2
New York Jets	8	8	0	.500	3–3	5–7	290	387	W2
Miami Dolphins	8	8	0	.500	2–4	7–5	317	335	L2
Buffalo Bills	6	10	0	.375	3–3	5–7	339	388	L1

=== Conference ===
AFC
#	Team	Division	W	L	T	PCT	DIV	CONF	SOS	SOV	STK
Division winners
1	Denver Broncos	West	13	3	0	.813	5–1	9–3	.469	.423	W2
2	New England Patriots	East	12	4	0	.750	4–2	9–3	.473	.427	W2
3 (Note: Cincinnati defeated Indianapolis head-to-head (Week 14, 42–28).)	Cincinnati Bengals	North	11	5	0	.688	3–3	8–4	.480	.494	W2
4	Indianapolis Colts	South	11	5	0	.688	6–0	9–3	.484	.449	W3
Wild cards
5	Kansas City Chiefs	West	11	5	0	.688	2–4	7–5	.445	.335	L2
6	San Diego Chargers	West	9	7	0	.563	4–2	6–6	.496	.549	W4
Did not qualify for the postseason
7 (Note: Pittsburgh finished with a better division record than Baltimore.) (Note: Pittsburgh defeated the New York Jets head-to-head (Week 6, 19–6).)	Pittsburgh Steelers	North	8	8	0	.500	4–2	6–6	.469	.441	W3
8 (Note: Baltimore defeated the New York Jets head-to-head (Week 12, 19–3).)	Baltimore Ravens	North	8	8	0	.500	3–3	6–6	.484	.418	L2
9 (Note: The New York Jets finished with a better division record than Miami.)	New York Jets	East	8	8	0	.500	3–3	5–7	.488	.414	W2
10	Miami Dolphins	East	8	8	0	.500	2–4	7–5	.523	.523	L2
11	Tennessee Titans	South	7	9	0	.438	2–4	6–6	.504	.375	W2
12	Buffalo Bills	East	6	10	0	.375	3–3	5–7	.520	.500	L1
13 (Note: Oakland and Jacksonville finished with a better conference record than Cleveland.) (Note: Oakland defeated Jacksonville head-to-head (Week 2, 19–9).)	Oakland Raiders	West	4	12	0	.250	1–5	4–8	.523	.359	L6
14 (Note: Jacksonville defeated Cleveland head-to-head (Week 13, 32–28).)	Jacksonville Jaguars	South	4	12	0	.250	3–3	4–8	.504	.234	L3
15	Cleveland Browns	North	4	12	0	.250	2–4	3–9	.516	.477	L7
16	Houston Texans	South	2	14	0	.125	1–5	2–10	.559	.500	L14
Tiebreakers (Note: When breaking ties for three or more teams under the NFL's rules, they are first broken within divisions, then comparing only the highest ranked remaining team from each division.)

== Postseason ==
Playoff round	Date	Opponent	Result	Record	Game site	NFL.com recap
Wild Card	First-round bye					
Divisional	January 11, 2014	Indianapolis Colts (4)	W 43–22	1–0	Gillette Stadium	Recap
AFC Championship	January 19, 2014	at Denver Broncos (1)	L 16–26	1–1	Sports Authority Field at Mile High	Recap

=== AFC Divisional Playoffs: vs. (4) Indianapolis Colts ===
AFC Divisional Playoff Game: (4) Indianapolis Colts at (2) New England Patriots – Game summary

Quarter	1	2	3	4	Total
Colts	7	5	10	0	22
Patriots	14	7	8	14	43

at Gillette Stadium, Foxborough, Massachusetts

- Date: January 11, 2014
- Game time: 8:10 p.m. EST
- Game weather: 57 °F (14 °C), rain and wind
- Game attendance: 68,756
- Referee: Pete Morelli
- TV announcers (CBS): Greg Gumbel (play-by-play), Dan Dierdorf (color commentator) and Allie LaForce (sideline reporter)
- Recap, Gamebook

Game information

First quarter

- NE – LeGarrette Blount 2-yard run (Stephen Gostkowski kick), 13:41. Patriots 7–0. Drive: 1 play, 2 yards, 0:04.
- NE – LeGarrette Blount 2-yard run (Stephen Gostkowski kick), 7:17. Patriots 14–0. Drive: 10 plays, 74 yards, 5:03.
- IND – LaVon Brazill 38-yard pass from Andrew Luck (Adam Vinatieri kick), 4:35. Patriots 14–7. Drive: 7 plays, 80 yards, 2:42.

Second quarter

- NE – LeGarrette Blount 2-yard run (Stephen Gostkowski kick), 10:54. Patriots 21–7. Drive: 14 plays, 75 yards, 6:28.
- IND – Adam Vinatieri 36-yard field goal, 5:35. Patriots 21–10. Drive: 11 plays, 62 yds, 5:19.
- IND – Ryan Allen fumble declared dead in endzone for a safety, 2:18. Patriots 21–12.

Third quarter

- IND – Adam Vinatieri 21-yard field goal, 10:03. Patriots 21–15. Drive: 8 plays, 60 yards, 3:27.
- NE – Stevan Ridley 3-yard run (2-pt conv. – Stevan Ridley run), 6:18. Patriots 29–15. Drive: 9 plays, 88 yards, 3:45.
- IND – LaVon Brazill 35-yard pass from Andrew Luck (Adam Vinatieri kick), 5:01. Patriots 29–22. Drive: 3 plays, 80 yards, 1:17.

Fourth quarter

- NE – LeGarrette Blount 73-yard run (Stephen Gostkowski kick), 12:55. Patriots 36–22. Drive: 1 play, 73 yards, 0:13.
- NE – Stevan Ridley 1-yard run (Stephen Gostkowski kick), 11:12. Patriots 43–22. Drive: 5 plays, 18 yards, 1:33.

Top passers

- IND – Andrew Luck – 20/41, 331 yards, 2 TD, 4 INT
- NE – Tom Brady – 13/25, 198 yards

Top rushers

- IND – Donald Brown – 17 rushes, 63 yards
- NE – LeGarrette Blount – 24 rushes, 166 yards, 4 TD

Top receivers

- IND – T. Y. Hilton – 4 rec, 103 yards
- NE – Julian Edelman – 6 rec, 84 yards

The Patriots punched their ticket to their 3rd straight AFC Championship game in a 43–22 dominating victory over the rival Colts. In the week leading up to the AFC Division round matchup, the Patriots made their gameplan clear, intending to take advantage of the Colts' questionable run defense by using a healthy dose of their three threats out of the backfield: Legarrette Blount, Stevan Ridley and Shane Vereen. This gameplan proved to be extremely effective, as New England scored six touchdowns on the ground, with Blount setting a franchise postseason record by scoring four of the six TD's. The three backs combined for 235 yards rushing, 166 coming from Blount alone, also a franchise postseason record. The Patriot defense was exemplary, picking off Andrew Luck four times, sacking him three times and relatively shutting down star wide receiver T.Y. Hilton for the majority of the game, although he did finish with 103 yards on four receptions.

=== AFC Championship: at #1 Denver Broncos ===
AFC Championship: (2) New England Patriots at (1) Denver Broncos – Game summary

Quarter	1	2	3	4	Total
Patriots	0	3	0	13	16
Broncos	3	10	7	6	26

at Sports Authority Field at Mile High, Denver, Colorado

- Date: January 19, 2014
- Game time: 3:00 p.m. EST/1:00 p.m. MST
- Game weather: 63 °F (17 °C), sunny
- Game attendance: 77,110
- Referee: Tony Corrente
- TV announcers (CBS): Jim Nantz (play-by-play), Phil Simms (color commentator) and Tracy Wolfson (sideline reporter)
- Recap, Gamebook

Game information

First quarter

- DEN – 3:43 Matt Prater 27-yard FG. Drive: 10 plays, 73 yards, 4:07. (DEN 3–0)

Second quarter

- DEN – 7:50 Jacob Tamme 1-yard TD pass from Peyton Manning, Matt Prater kick. Drive: 15 plays, 93 yards, 7:01. (DEN 10–0)
- NE – 2:54 Stephen Gostkowski 47-yard FG. Drive: 9 plays, 51 yards, 4:56. (DEN 10–3)
- DEN – 0:25 Matt Prater 35-yard FG. Drive: 8 plays, 63 yards, 2:29. (DEN 13–3)

Third quarter

- DEN – 7:52 Demaryius Thomas 3-yard TD pass from Peyton Manning, Matt Prater kick. Drive: 13 plays, 80 yards, 7:08. (DEN 20–3)

Fourth quarter

- DEN – 12:02 Matt Prater 19-yard FG. Drive: 9 plays, 60 yards, 5:23. (DEN 23–3)
- NE – 9:26 Julian Edelman 7-yard TD pass from Tom Brady, Stephen Gostkowski kick. Drive: 9 plays, 80 yards, 2:36. (DEN 23–10)
- DEN – 7:00 Matt Prater 54-yard FG. Drive: 6 plays, 39 yards, 2:26. (DEN 26–10)
- NE – 3:07 Tom Brady 5-yard TD run, two-point run failed. Drive: 10 plays, 80 yards, 3:53. (DEN 26–16)

Top passers

- NE – Tom Brady: 24/38, 277 yards, 1 TD, 1 rushing TD
- DEN – Peyton Manning: 32/43, 400 yards, 2 TD

Top rushers

- NE – Shane Vereen: 4 rushes, 34 yards
- DEN – Knowshon Moreno: 14 rushes, 59 yards

Top receivers

- NE – Julian Edelman: 10 receptions, 89 yards, 1 TD
- DEN – Demaryius Thomas: 7 receptions, 134 yards, 1 TD

Top tacklers

- NE – Devin McCourty: 9 tackles
- DEN – Danny Trevathan: 8 tackles

With the loss, the Patriots became the first team to lose consecutive AFC championship games since their division rival New York Jets did in 2009 and 2010.
