= Aaron Dobson =

American football player and coach (born 1991)

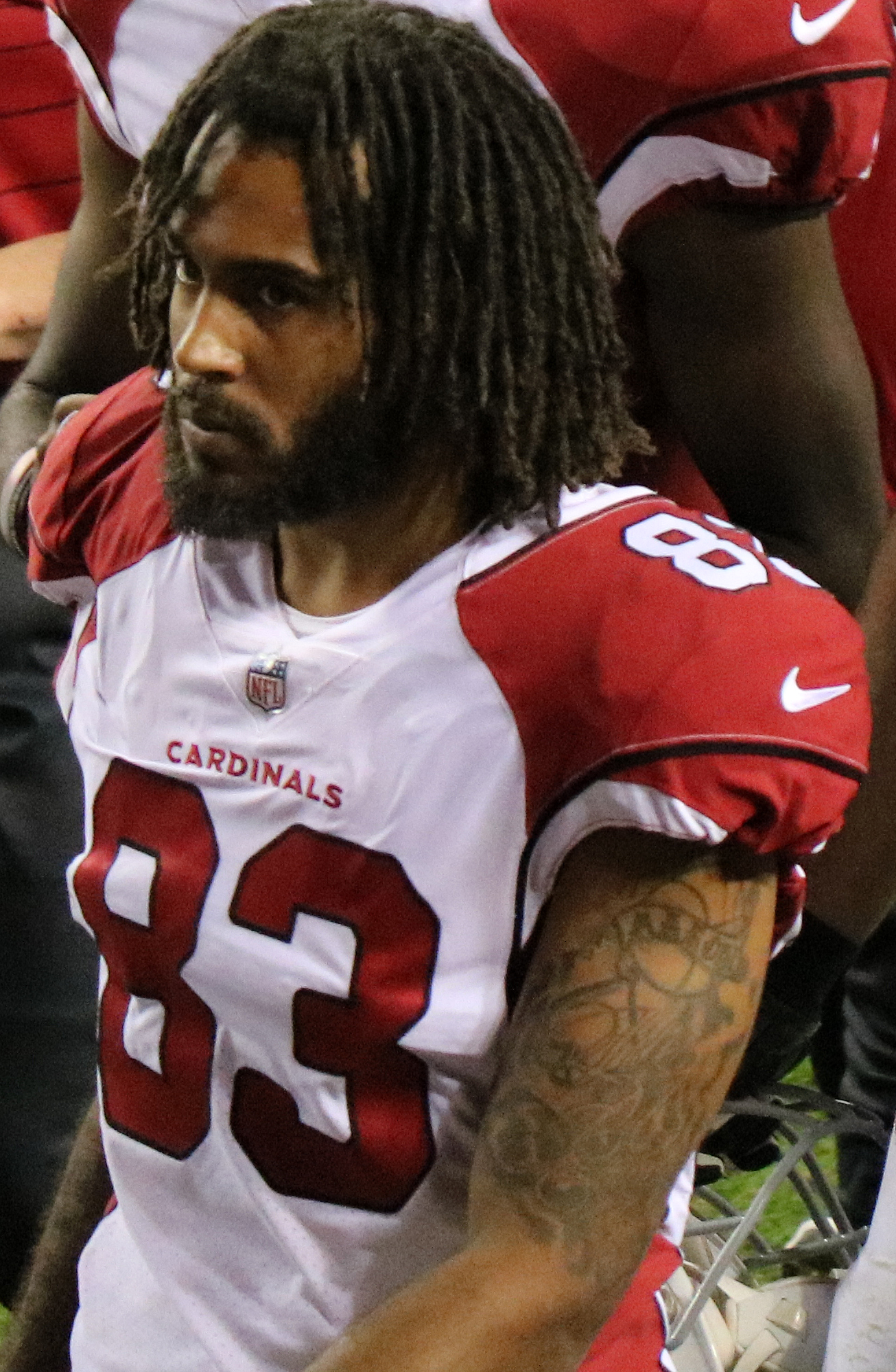
- Dobson with the Arizona Cardinals in 2017

Memphis Tigers
- Title: Wide receivers coach

Personal information
- Born: July 23, 1991 (age 35); Dunbar, West Virginia, U.S.
- Listed height: 6 ft 3 in (1.91 m)
- Listed weight: 205 lb (93 kg)

Career information
- High school: South Charleston (South Charleston, West Virginia)
- College: Marshall (2009–2012)
- NFL draft: 2013: 2nd round, 59th overall pick

Career history

Playing
- New England Patriots (2013–2015); Detroit Lions (2016); Arizona Cardinals (2017)*
- * Offseason or practice squad member only

Coaching
- Marshall (2023) Offensive analyst; Marshall (2024) Wide receivers coach; Southern Miss (2025) Wide receivers coach; Memphis (2026–present) Wide receivers coach

Awards and highlights
- Super Bowl champion (XLIX); Second-team All-C-USA (2012); Beef 'O' Brady's Bowl MVP (2011)

Career NFL statistics
- Receptions: 53
- Receiving yards: 698
- Receiving touchdowns: 4
- Stats at Pro Football Reference

Aaron Jameer Dobson (born July 23, 1991) is an American football coach and former professional football wide receiver. He was selected by the New England Patriots in the second round of the 2013 NFL draft and played college football at Marshall. He is currently the wide receivers coach at Memphis.

== Early life ==
Dobson was born in Dunbar, West Virginia. He attended South Charleston High School in South Charleston, West Virginia, and played high school football and high school basketball for the South Charleston Black Eagles. He recorded 45 receptions for 1,298 yards and 17 touchdowns as a senior and added seven interceptions on defense, and finished his high school career with 108 receptions, 2,365 yards and 32 touchdowns. He had 10 interceptions, two of which he returned for touchdowns, and was a member of the 2008 MSAC Championship team and 2008 West Virginia AAA State Championship, which finished with a 14–0 record.

In 2009, he played for USA Football's U.S. Under-19 National Team that won the 2009 IFAF Under-19 World Championship in Canton, Ohio, where he was teammates with future New York Giants running back, David Wilson.

== College career ==
Dobson attended Marshall University, where he played for the Marshall Thundering Herd football team from 2009 to 2012. During his college career, Dobson had 165 receptions for 2,398 yards and 24 touchdowns. As a junior in 2011, he was the MVP of the 2011 Beef 'O' Brady's Bowl. He ended his Marshall senior season being named 2nd team All-Conference USA and being invited to play in the Senior Bowl.

Dobson gained recognition in 2011 during a game against East Carolina, when he had a one-handed backhand catch for a touchdown in the second quarter. The play went viral and was ranked second on ESPN's Top 10 Plays of the Year.

== Professional career ==
Pre-draft measurables
Height	Weight	Arm length	Hand span	40-yard dash	10-yard split	20-yard split	20-yard shuttle	Three-cone drill	Vertical jump	Broad jump	Bench press
6 ft 2 3/4 in (1.90 m)	210 lb (95 kg)	33 in (0.84 m)	9 in (0.23 m)	4.42 s	1.51 s	2.60 s	4.33 s	7.19 s	35 in (0.89 m)	10 ft 2 in (3.10 m)	16 reps
All values from NFL Combine.

=== New England Patriots ===
The New England Patriots selected Dobson in the second round, with the 59th overall pick, of the 2013 NFL draft. He signed a four-year, $3.4 million contract. His first career catch was for a touchdown against the New York Jets in Week 2. In a Week 9 win against the Pittsburgh Steelers, he had the first 100-yard game of his career. He caught five passes for 130 yards and two touchdowns. He suffered a foot injury in week 12 against the Broncos and missed weeks 13–15. He appeared in 12 games (nine starts) with 519 receiving yards and four touchdowns during his rookie campaign in 2013.

Dobson was inactive for eight of the first twelve weeks of the 2014 season before injuring his hamstring against the Green Bay Packers in Week 13. On December 4, 2014, he was placed on injured reserve. With Dobson on IR, the Patriots won Super Bowl XLIX after they defeated the defending champion Seattle Seahawks, 28–24.

Dobson was active for Week 1 against the Steelers on September 10, 2015. He played sparingly recording one reception for nine yards. In the second week, against the Buffalo Bills, he tied a career-high with seven catches, for 87 yards. He recorded a 17-yard pass from quarterback Tom Brady in a 20–13 win over the Bills in Week 11; on the play, he injured his ankle and had to leave the game. He was diagnosed with a high ankle sprain, and on November 26, 2015, the Patriots placed him on injured reserve, ending his season.

On September 3, 2016, Dobson was released by the Patriots as part of final roster cuts.

=== Detroit Lions ===
On September 21, 2016, Dobson was signed by the Detroit Lions. He was released on September 24, 2016. On September 27, 2016, he was re-signed by the Lions. He was released again on October 8, 2016.

=== Arizona Cardinals ===
On January 5, 2017, Dobson signed a reserve/future contract with the Arizona Cardinals. He was placed on injured reserve on September 2, 2017. He was released on September 6, 2017.

== Career statistics ==
=== NFL ===
==== Regular season ====
Year	Team	Games		Receiving					Fumbles	
Year	Team	GP	GS	Rec	Yds	Avg	Lng	TD	Fum	Lost
2013	NE	12	9	37	519	14.0	81	4	1	0
2014	NE	4	1	3	38	12.7	16	0	0	0
2015	NE	8	3	13	141	10.8	24	0	0	0
Total		24	13	53	698	13.2	81	4	1	0

==== Postseason ====
Year	Team	Games		Receiving					Fumbles	
Year	Team	GP	GS	Rec	Yds	Avg	Lng	TD	Fum	Lost
2013	NE	1	0	2	33	16.5	27	0	0	0
Total		1	0	2	33	16.5	27	0	0	0

=== College ===
Season	Team	GP	Receiving					Rushing				
Season	Team	GP	Rec	Yds	Avg	Lng	TD	Att	Yds	Avg	Lng	TD
2009	Marshall	12	15	362	24.1	48	4	—	—	—	—	—
2010	Marshall	12	44	689	15.7	96	5	2	18	9.0	17	0
2011	Marshall	13	49	668	13.6	77	12	1	1	1.0	1	0
2012	Marshall	12	57	679	11.9	40	3	—	—	—	—	—
Total		47	165	2398	14.5	96	24	3	19	6.3	17	0

== Coaching career ==
In 2023, Dobson was hired as an offensive quality control analyst at Marshall by head coach Charles Huff. After the season, he was promoted to wide receivers coach.

In December 2024, Dobson was named wide receivers coach at Southern Miss, again under Charles Huff. The following year, Dobson was hired by Huff at Memphis at the same position.
