= Aqib Talib =

American football player (born 1986)

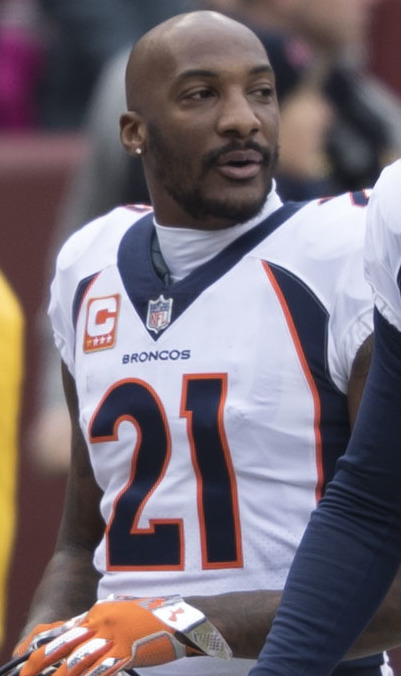
- Talib with the Denver Broncos in 2017

No. 25, 31, 21
- Position: Cornerback

Personal information
- Born: February 13, 1986 (age 40); Cleveland, Ohio, U.S.
- Listed height: 6 ft 1 in (1.85 m)
- Listed weight: 209 lb (95 kg)

Career information
- High school: Berkner (Richardson, Texas)
- College: Kansas (2004–2007)
- NFL draft: 2008: 1st round, 20th overall pick

Career history
- Tampa Bay Buccaneers (2008–2012); New England Patriots (2012–2013); Denver Broncos (2014–2017); Los Angeles Rams (2018–2019); Miami Dolphins (2019)

Awards and highlights
- Super Bowl champion (50); First-team All-Pro (2016); Second-team All-Pro (2013); 5× Pro Bowl (2013–2017); Jack Tatum Trophy (2007); Unanimous All-American (2007); 2× First-team All-Big 12 (2006, 2007)

Career NFL statistics
- Total tackles: 462
- Pass deflections: 125
- Interceptions: 35
- Forced fumbles: 5
- Fumble recoveries: 4
- Defensive touchdowns: 10
- Stats at Pro Football Reference

Aqib Talib (born February 13, 1986) is an American former professional football player who was a cornerback in the National Football League (NFL). He played college football for the Kansas Jayhawks, earning unanimous All-American honors. He was selected by the Tampa Bay Buccaneers in the first round of the 2008 NFL draft. Talib also played for the New England Patriots, Denver Broncos, and Los Angeles Rams, winning Super Bowl 50 with Denver. In 2020, he made his debut as an analyst for the NFL on Fox.

== Early life ==
Aqib Talib was born in Cleveland, Ohio, to parents Theodore Henry and Okolo Talib in a Muslim household. Talib is the youngest of four siblings; he has two older sisters, Saran and Kai, and an older brother, Yaqub. As the youngest of four children, he was named Aqib which means "the last one" in Arabic. His last name, Talib, means "student." Aqib's parents divorced when he was young, and he spent much of his childhood between Ohio and New Jersey. When Talib was in the eighth grade, his mother moved to Richardson, Texas, with him and his older brother.

Talib attended Berkner High School in Richardson, Texas, and lettered in football, basketball, and track. In football, as a senior, he was named Berkner High School's Defensive Back of the Year while garnering first-team all-district and first-team all-city honors. In track & field, he was a member of the 4 × 100m (43.05) and 4 × 200m (1:32.77) relay squads.

As a college football prospect during his senior year, Talib was rated as a two-star recruit by Rivals.com. He was recruited by Kansas, Wyoming, Tulsa, Arizona, Kansas State, and Baylor. He chose to sign a National Letter of Intent to play for Kansas.

== College career ==
Talib attended the University of Kansas, where he played for the Kansas Jayhawks football team from 2004 to 2007.

Talib in 2007 with Kansas

Talib established himself as one of the best defensive college football players in the country as a junior in 2007, and was recognized as a unanimous All-American. He also continued to play sparingly as a wide receiver, catching four touchdown passes through the first nine games. Against rival Kansas State, Talib preserved a victory by intercepting a Josh Freeman pass in the final moments of the game. He also returned an interception 102 yards for a touchdown against Florida International.

In the 2008 Orange Bowl against Virginia Tech, Talib returned an interception for a touchdown thrown by Tyrod Taylor and was named the game's Most Valuable Player. He announced on January 6, 2008, that he would forgo his senior season and enter the 2008 NFL draft.

Talib was added to the Kansas Ring of Honor in 2017 along with his Orange Bowl Championship teammate Anthony Collins.

== Professional career ==
=== Pre-draft ===
As one of the nation's top cornerback prospects, Talib received an invitation to the 2008 NFL Combine, held at the RCA Dome in Indianapolis, Indiana.

Pre-draft measurables
Height	Weight	Arm length	Hand span	40-yard dash	10-yard split	20-yard split	20-yard shuttle	Three-cone drill	Vertical jump	Broad jump	Bench press
6 ft 0 3/4 in (1.85 m)	202 lb (92 kg)	33 in (0.84 m)	9 3/8 in (0.24 m)	4.44 s	1.51 s	2.56 s	4.22 s	6.82 s	38 in (0.97 m)	10 ft 11 in (3.33 m)	10 reps
All values are from NFL Combine

=== Tampa Bay Buccaneers ===
==== 2008 ====
The Tampa Bay Buccaneers selected Talib in the first round (20th overall) of the 2008 NFL draft. He was the third cornerback selected, behind Leodis McKelvin and Dominique Rodgers-Cromartie. He became the first Kansas player to be drafted in the first round since 1993 when Dana Stubblefield was drafted 26th overall by the San Francisco 49ers. Talib also became the second cornerback ever taken by the Tampa Bay Buccaneers in the first round since they selected Rod Jones in the 1986 NFL draft.

On July 25, 2008, the Buccaneers signed Talib to a four-year, $14 million contract that included $8 million guaranteed.

While attending the NFL's rookie symposium, Talib got into a fight with fellow rookie and teammate Cory Boyd. He also overslept and missed a flight to Canton, Ohio, for a mandatory rookie function at the Pro Football Hall of Fame. Talib also missed team meetings during organized team activities and training camp his rookie season. Throughout training camp, Talib competed for a job as one of the starting cornerbacks against Phillip Buchanon. Head coach Jon Gruden named Talib the third cornerback on the depth chart behind veteran Ronde Barber and Buchanon to begin the regular season.

He made his professional regular season debut in the Tampa Bay Buccaneers' season-opener at the New Orleans Saints and made one solo tackle in their 24–20 loss. In Week 2, Talib made his first career interception off a pass attempt by Atlanta Falcons' rookie quarterback Matt Ryan as Tampa Bay defeated them 24–9. The following game, Talib was inactive for Tampa Bay's 27–24 victory at the Chicago Bears. On October 12, 2008, he recorded a season-high three combined tackles, deflected two passes, and intercepted Jake Delhomme in a 27–3 win over the Carolina Panthers. On November 2, 2008, Talib made his first career start during the Buccaneers' 30–27 victory at the Kansas City Chiefs. He finished his rookie season in 2008 with 23 combined tackles (17 solo), nine pass deflections, and four interceptions in 15 games and two starts. Head coach Jon Gruden was fired after the Buccaneers finished third in the NFC South with a 9–7 record.

==== 2009 ====
The Tampa Bay Buccaneers promoted defensive backs coach Raheem Morris to head coach. He named Talib the starting cornerback, alongside Ronde Barber, after Buchanon departed for the Detroit Lions in free agency.

On October 4, 2009, Talib recorded four solo tackles, three pass deflections, and had a career-high three interceptions off of Washington Redskins' quarterback Jason Campbell during their 16–13 loss. Talib was inactive for the Buccaneers' Week 13 loss at the Carolina Panthers. On December 20, 2009, he collected a season-high eight combined tackles in their 24–7 win at the Seattle Seahawks. He finished the 2009 season with a career-high 64 combined tackles (56 solo), 15 passes defensed, and five interceptions in 15 games and 15 starts. Defensive coordinator Jim Bates was fired after a 1–9 start and the Tampa Bay Buccaneers finished the season with a 3–13 record.

==== 2010 ====
Head coach Raheem Morris retained defensive coordinator duties and opted to keep Ronde Barber and Aqib Talib as the starting cornerbacks. On August 31, 2010, it was reported that the NFL Commissioner Roger Goodell issued Talib a one-game suspension, to serve during the Buccaneers' season-opener, for his involvement in a battery of a taxi driver (See Personal life).

He made his season debut in the Tampa Bay Buccaneers' Week 2 game against the Carolina Panthers and recorded a tackle, a pass deflection, and an interception during their 20–7 victory. On October 31, 2010, Talib recorded five solo tackles, two interceptions, and scored his first career touchdown in Tampa Bay's 38–35 victory at the Arizona Cardinals. He intercepted quarterback Max Hall in the second quarter and returned it 45-yards for his first career touchdown, but also was penalized for unsportsmanlike conduct for taunting during his return. In Week 10, he recorded a season-high eight combined tackles and deflected a pass during a 31–16 victory against the Carolina Panthers. On December 6, 2010, the Tampa Bay Buccaneers placed Talib on injured reserve due to a hip injury he suffered during a Week 13 loss to the Atlanta Falcons. He finished the 2010 season with 40 combined tackles (39 solo), 11 pass deflections, a touchdown, and a career-high six interceptions in 11 games and 11 starts.

The Tampa Bay Buccaneers finished with a 10–6 record in 2010, but did not qualify for the playoffs after finishing third in their division. After the 2010 season, Talib was named Defensive Back of the Year by the NFL Alumni Association.

==== 2011 ====
Talib and Barber remained as the starting cornerback duo in 2011. He started the Tampa Bay Buccaneers' season-opener against the Detroit Lions and recorded three solo tackles, two pass deflections, and returned an interception by Matthew Stafford for a 28-yard touchdown during their 27–20 loss to the Lions. In Week 3, Talib made a season-high six solo tackles in a 16–13 victory over the Atlanta Falcons. On November 27, 2011, Talib recorded three combined tackles, deflected a pass, and scored his third career touchdown after intercepting Matt Hasselbeck and returning it 28-yards during the Buccaneers' 23–17 loss at the Tennessee Titans. He was sidelined for a Week 11 loss at the Jacksonville Jaguars due to a hamstring injury. On December 19, 2011, the Tampa Bay Buccaneers placed Talib on injured reserve after due to a recurring hamstring injury. He finished the season with 34 combined tackles (31 solo), 11 pass deflections, two interceptions, two touchdowns, and a forced fumble in 13 games and 13 starts.

The Tampa Bay Buccaneers finished the 2011 season last in the NFC South with a 4–12 record and had a ten-game losing streak to end the season. On January 2, 2012, head coach Raheem Morris was fired by the Buccaneers after his third season.

==== 2012 ====
New head coach Greg Schiano named Talib and newly acquired free agent Eric Wright the starting cornerbacks to begin the regular season after Ronde Barber was moved to free safety.

On September 15, 2012, Talib recorded a season-high eight solo tackles during a 41–34 loss at the New York Giants. The following week, he made seven solo tackles, deflected a pass, and intercepted Tony Romo in their 16–10 loss at the Dallas Cowboys.

On October 13, 2012, Talib was suspended by the NFL for four games for violating the league's policy on performance-enhancing substances. Talib's positive result was for Adderall and he released a statement saying, "Around the beginning of training camp, I made a mistake by taking an Adderall pill without a prescription."

=== New England Patriots ===
==== 2012 ====
On November 1, 2012, the Tampa Bay Buccaneers traded Talib and a 2013 seventh-round draft pick to the New England Patriots for a 2013 fourth-round draft pick. The Buccaneers went on to draft defensive end William Gholston with their fourth-round pick and the Patriots selected defensive end Michael Buchanan with their seventh-round pick.

On November 12, 2012, Talib returned from his four-game suspension. Head coach Bill Belichick named Talib one of the starting cornerbacks with Kyle Arrington after moving Devin McCourty to free safety. On November 18, 2012, Talib made his New England Patriots debut against the Indianapolis Colts and recorded seven combined tackles, defended a pass, and returned an interception from rookie quarterback Andrew Luck for a 59-yard touchdown as the Patriots routed the Colts 59–24. Talib was plagued with a hip injury throughout the season and missed the Patriots' Week 17 28–0 win vs the Miami Dolphins. He finished the 2012 season with 40 combined tackles (33 solo), ten pass deflections, two interceptions, and a touchdown in ten games and nine starts.

The New England Patriots finished atop the AFC East with a 12–4 record and were given a first round bye. On January 13. 2013, Talib started his first career playoff game and recorded ten combined tackles as the Patriots defeated the Houston Texans 41–28. The following week, they were defeated 28–13 in the AFC Championship by the eventual Super Bowl XLVII champion Baltimore Ravens.

==== 2013 ====
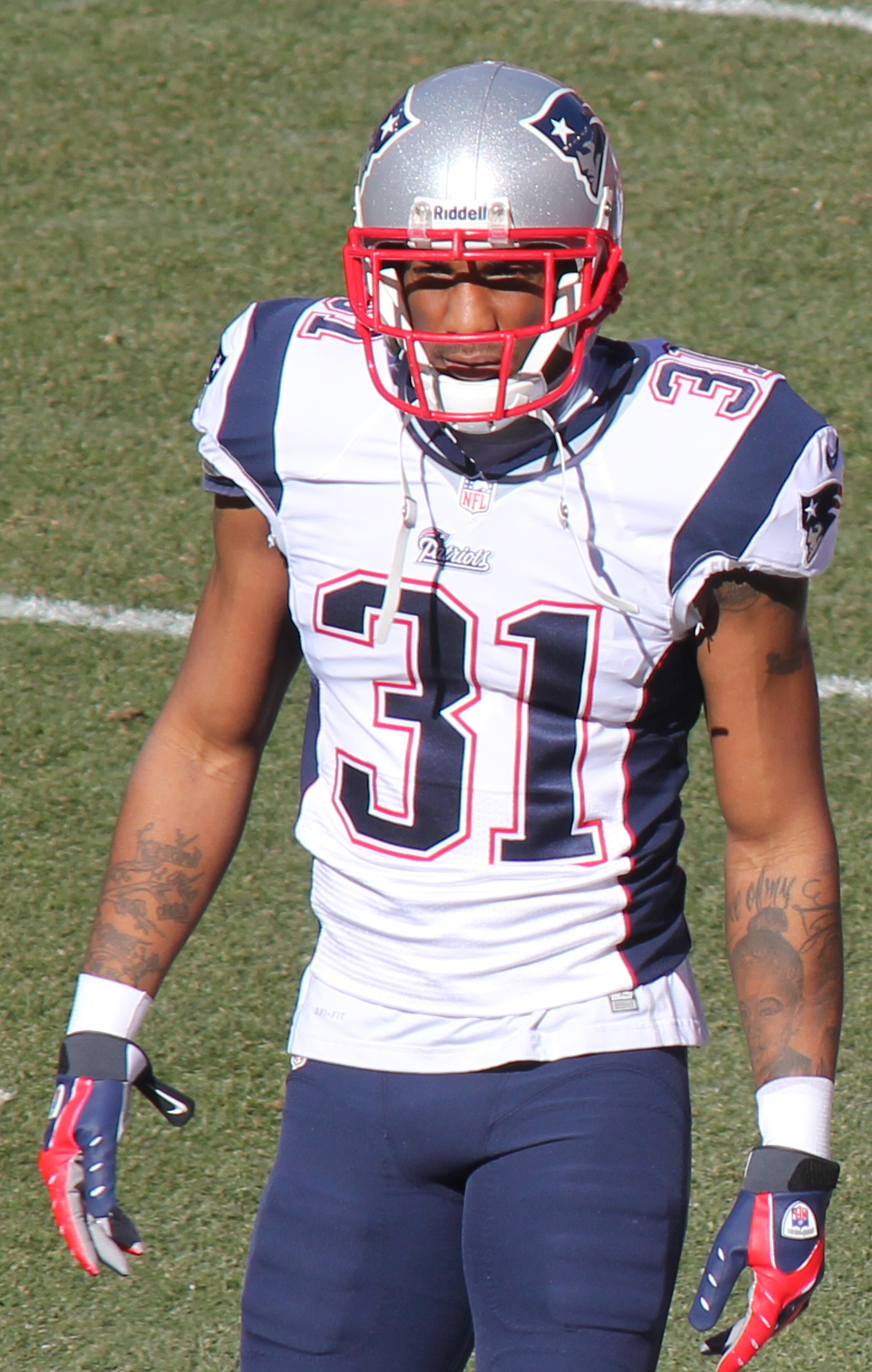
Talib with the Patriots in the 2013 postseason

On March 16, 2013, the Patriots signed Talib to a one-year, $4.86 million contract that includes $4.57 million guaranteed and a signing bonus of $3 million.

He was named one of the starting cornerbacks, alongside Alfonzo Dennard to begin the regular season. On September 12, 2013, Talib recorded two combined tackles, two pass deflections, and two interceptions during a 13–10 win against the New York Jets. He missed three consecutive games (Weeks 7–9) after aggravating his hip injury that plagued him over the last two seasons. He finished the 2013 with 41 combined tackles (35 solo), 14 pass deflections, and four interceptions in 13 games and 13 starts. Talib was targeted 65 times and allowed 29 receptions (44%) for 471 yards and two touchdowns in 2013.

The Patriots repeated as AFC East champions and received a first-round bye with a 12–4 record. After defeating the Indianapolis Colts in the divisional round, they went on to face the Denver Broncos, only to lose the game 26–16. Talib left in the second quarter after taking a hit by former teammate Wes Welker and did not return. Although it was suspected he suffered an injury to his ribs at first, it was later discovered Talib suffered a knee injury. Head coach Bill Belichick stated "As it turned out, it was a key play in the game." Without Talib, Kyle Arrington and rookie Logan Ryan were tasked with covering Demaryius Thomas as the Patriots' defense gave up 505 yards, the most during the Belichick's tenure with New England at the time. Talib's 2013 performance was good enough for a selection to the 2013 Pro Bowl and a second-team selection to the 2013 All-Pro Team, both of which were his first career selections. He was ranked 79th by his fellow players on the NFL Top 100 Players of 2014.

=== Denver Broncos ===
==== 2014 ====
On March 11, 2014, the Denver Broncos signed Talib to a six-year, $57 million contract that included $26 million guaranteed. He was reunited with his former college teammate Chris Harris Jr. and former Patriots teammate Wes Welker. The contract was heavily criticized by members of the media and analysts, many opining that the Broncos overpaid for Talib. The New England Patriots also offered Talib a contract, but he stated it was a business decision and both parties could not agree on the amount of guaranteed money and time of payouts. He signed with the Broncos on the first day of free agency and stated he knew beforehand that he would end up signing with them. The joining of the Broncos would bring in a major piece of the No Fly Zone.

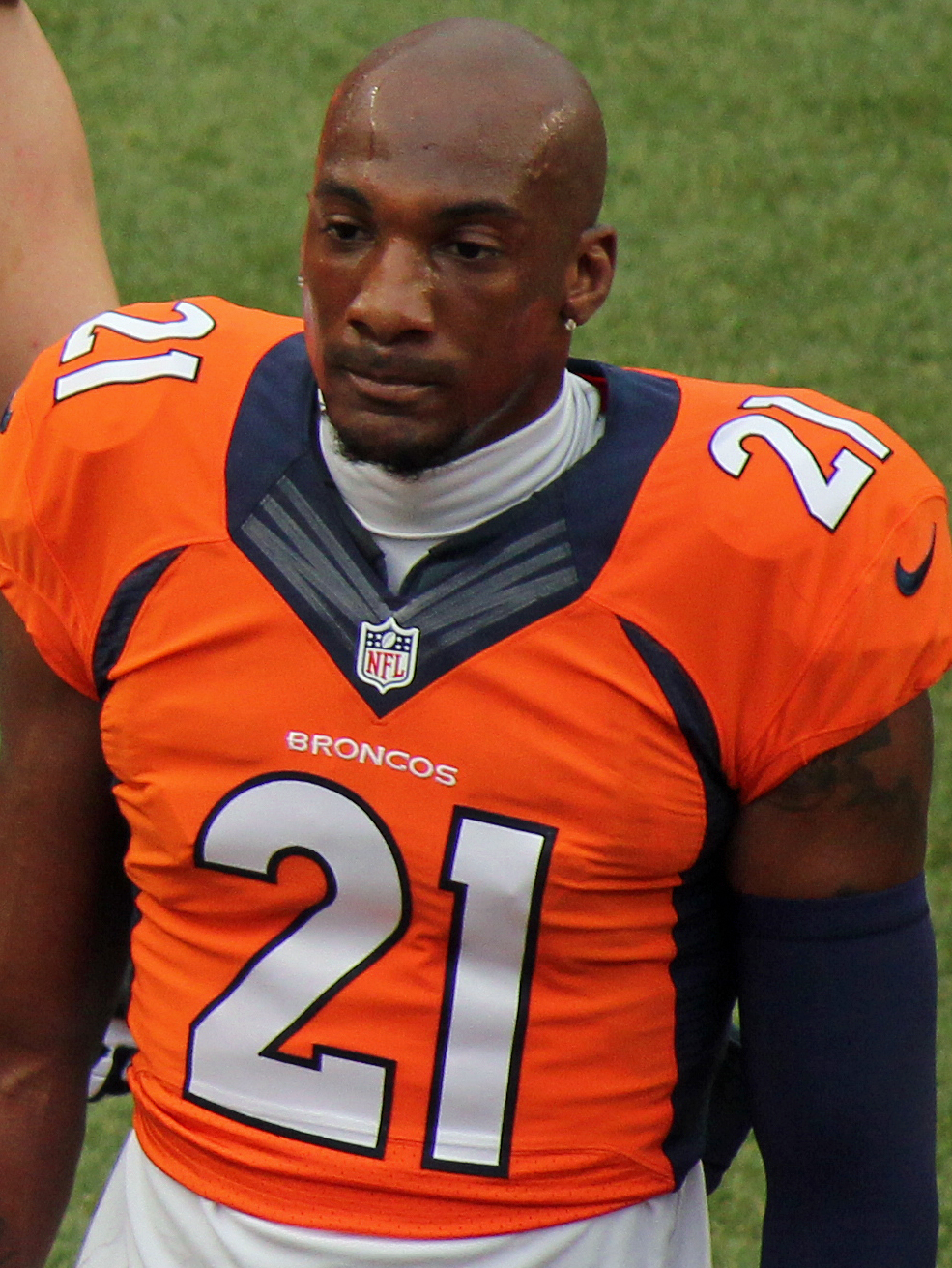
Talib with the Denver Broncos in 2014

Talib was named the starting cornerback, along with Chris Harris Jr, replacing Champ Bailey and Dominique Rodgers-Cromartie. Head coach John Fox revamped the secondary by signing Talib, safety T. J. Ward, and drafting cornerback Bradley Roby in the first round of the 2014 NFL draft.

On October 12, 2014, Talib recorded four solo tackles, two pass deflections, and returned an interception by Geno Smith for a 22-yard touchdown in the fourth quarter of their 31–17 victory at the New York Jets. Talib missed the Broncos' Week 13 victory at the Kansas City Chiefs with a hamstring injury. In Week 15, he made a season-high eight combined tackles, deflected three passes, and had an interception in the Broncos' 22–10 win at the San Diego Chargers. The following week, Talib made four combined tackles, tied his season-high of three pass deflections, and returned an interception off Cincinnati Bengals' quarterback Andy Dalton for a 33-yard touchdown in a 37–28 loss. On December 23, 2014, Talib was voted to his second career Pro Bowl, along with eight teammates. In Week 17, Talib recorded four combined tackles and made his first career sack on Derek Carr as the Broncos routed the Oakland Raiders 47–14. He finished his first season in Denver with a career-high tying 64 combined tackles (55 solo), a career-high 16 pass deflections, four interceptions, and two touchdowns in 15 games and 15 starts.

The Denver Broncos finished first in the AFC West with a 12–4 record, but were eliminated from the playoffs after losing 24–13 in the AFC divisional round to the Indianapolis Colts. Talib made four solo tackles and a pass deflection during the game. On January 25, 2015, Talib appeared in the 2015 Pro Bowl as part of Team Carter and recorded four solo tackles and a pass deflection as they were defeated by Team Irvin 32–28.

==== 2015 ====
Baltimore Ravens' offensive coordinator Gary Kubiak was named the new head coach after the Denver Broncos and head coach John Fox agreed to part ways. Defensive coordinator Wade Phillips chose to keep Talib and Chris Harris Jr. as the starting cornerbacks with Bradley Roby as the nickelback.

He started the Denver Broncos' season-opener against the Baltimore Ravens' and recorded three combined tackles, two pass deflections, and intercepted quarterback Joe Flacco and returned it for a 51-yard touchdown in their 19–13 victory. On October 18, 2015, against the Cleveland Browns Talib intercepted a pass from quarterback Josh McCown and returned it for a 63 yard touchdown in the 26–23 overtime win. On November 8, 2015, Talib poked the eye of Indianapolis Colts tight end Dwayne Allen late in the fourth quarter of the Broncos' 27–24 loss. The Broncos were given a 15-yard penalty with the Colts receiving a first down and ended any chance of a comeback by the Broncos. Talib was later suspended for the Broncos' Week 10 loss to the Kansas City Chiefs. He finished the season with 45 combined tackles (39 solo), 13 pass deflections, two interceptions, and two touchdowns in 15 games and 15 starts.

The Denver Broncos finished with a 12–4 record, received a first round bye and defeated the Pittsburgh Steelers 23–16 in the AFC Divisional round. On January 24, 2016, Talib tipped a two-point conversion pass by Tom Brady which the Broncos intercepted in the end zone, preserving a 20–18 fourth quarter lead as they defeated the New England Patriots in the AFC Championship.

On February 7, 2016, Talib appeared in his first career Super Bowl and recorded five solo tackles and deflected two passes during their 24–10 victory over the Carolina Panthers in Super Bowl 50. He got off to a bad start in the game when he was assessed two penalties in the first half for clashing with wide receiver Corey Brown, first for taunting him after a sack, and then for viciously grabbing his face mask to prevent him from scoring a touchdown. Later, Talib admitted to reporters that he committed the face-mask penalty on purpose. Talib was fined $26,044 for his feud with Brown. Talib was ranked 34th by his peers on the NFL Top 100 Players of 2016.

==== 2016 ====
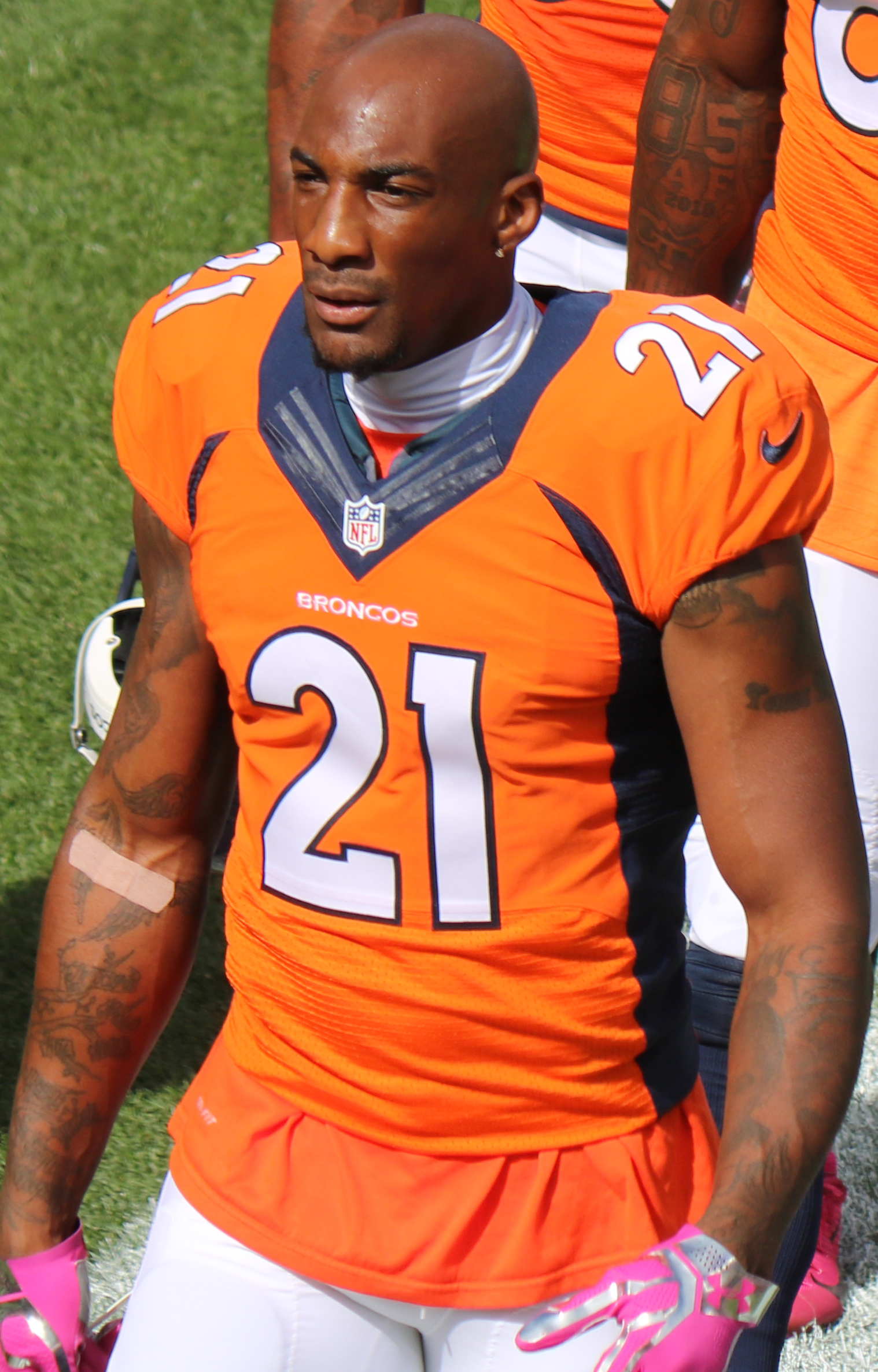
Talib with the Denver Broncos in 2016

Talib had 12 pass deflections and three interceptions in 2016, including one returned 46 yards for a touchdown in the fourth quarter in Week 2 against the Indianapolis Colts. It was his franchise-record fifth interception return touchdown as a member of the Broncos. Despite missing three games due to injury, on December 20, Talib was named to the 2016 Pro Bowl and was named First-team All-Pro along with fellow Bronco cornerback Chris Harris Jr. He was also ranked 37th by his peers on the NFL Top 100 Players of 2017.

==== 2017 ====
On September 17, 2017, in Week 2 against the Dallas Cowboys, Talib recorded a career-long 103-yard pick six off quarterback Dak Prescott late in the fourth quarter of the 42–17 victory. During Week 12 against the Oakland Raiders, Talib got into a fight with Michael Crabtree, resulting in both players being ejected. The next day, both combatants were suspended for two games. However, the suspension was reduced to one game following a joint appeal. On December 19, 2017, Talib was named to his fifth straight Pro Bowl. Talib finished the 2017 season with 31 combined tackles (23 solo), seven pass deflections, an interception, and a touchdown in 15 games and 15 starts. He was ranked 53rd by his peers on the NFL Top 100 Players of 2018.

=== Los Angeles Rams ===
On March 8, 2018, the Broncos agreed to a trade that sent Talib to the Los Angeles Rams in exchange for a fifth round pick in the 2018 NFL draft. The deal became official on March 14, at the start of the NFL year.

Talib entered the 2018 season as a starting cornerback alongside fellow trade acquisition Marcus Peters. In Week 3, Talib suffered an ankle injury that required surgery. He was placed on injured reserve on September 26, 2018. He was activated off injured reserve on November 30. Talib returned in week 13 where the Rams defeated the Detroit Lions 30–16. In week 15, Talib recorded his first interception on the season in a 30–23 loss to the Philadelphia Eagles. He finished the season with 23 tackles, 1 interception, and 1 forced fumble. Talib helped the Rams defeat the Dallas Cowboys and New Orleans Saints in the playoffs to reach Super Bowl LIII where the Rams lost 13–3 to Talib's former team the New England Patriots. Talib recorded 4 tackles in the game.

Talib entered the 2019 season as a starting cornerback for the Rams. He was placed on injured reserve on October 14, 2019, with a rib injury.

=== Miami Dolphins ===
On October 29, 2019, Talib was traded, along with a fifth-round pick, to the Miami Dolphins for a 2022 seventh-round pick, reuniting Talib with former Patriots coaches, including head coach Brian Flores and wide receiver coach Chad O'Shea. Because he was on injured reserve, Talib did not play for the Dolphins before becoming a free agent at the end of the season.

=== Retirement ===
On September 9, 2020, Talib announced his retirement. He had turned down an offer to return to the Patriots, saying he no longer felt like playing football. Talib worked as a commentator for Fox Sports up until 2021. He was set to join the Thursday Night Football broadcasting team for Amazon Prime Video, but stepped away from the position due to personal legal difficulties.

== NFL career statistics ==
Legend
	Won the Super Bowl
**Bold**	Career high

=== Regular season ===
Year	Team	Games		Tackles				Fumbles			Interceptions					
Year	Team	GP	GS	Cmb	Solo	Ast	Sck	FF	FR	Yds	Int	Yds	Avg	Lng	TD	PD
2008	TB	15	2	23	17	6	0.0	0	0	0	4	32	8.0	19	0	9
2009	TB	15	15	**64**	**56**	8	0.0	0	**1**	−5	5	99	19.8	32	0	15
2010	TB	11	11	40	39	1	0.0	0	0	0	**6**	91	15.2	45	1	11
2011	TB	13	13	34	31	3	0.0	**1**	0	0	2	55	27.5	28	**2**	11
2012	TB	4	4	21	20	1	0.0	0	0	0	1	0	0.0	0	0	8
2012	NE	6	5	19	13	6	0.0	0	**1**	5	1	59	59.0	59	1	2
2013	NE	13	13	41	35	6	0.0	**1**	**1**	0	4	12	3.0	14	0	14
2014	DEN	15	15	**64**	55	9	**1.0**	**1**	0	0	4	62	15.5	33	**2**	**16**
2015	DEN	15	15	45	39	6	0.0	0	0	0	3	**123**	41.0	63	**2**	13
2016	DEN	13	13	43	32	**11**	0.0	0	0	0	3	86	28.7	46	1	12
2017	DEN	15	15	31	23	8	0.0	**1**	0	0	1	103	**103.0**	**103**	1	7
2018	LAR	8	8	23	18	5	0.0	**1**	**1**	**47**	1	30	30.0	30	0	5
2019	LAR	5	5	14	7	7	0.0	0	0	0	0	0	0.0	0	0	2
2019	MIA	0	0	Did not play due to injury												
Career		148	134	462	385	77	1.0	5	4	47	35	752	21.5	103	10	125

=== Postseason ===
Year	Team	Games		Tackles				Fumbles			Interceptions					
Year	Team	GP	GS	Cmb	Solo	Ast	Sck	FF	FR	Yds	Int	Yds	Avg	Lng	TD	PD
2012	NE	2	2	10	9	1	0.0	0	0	0	0	0	0.0	0	0	1
2013	NE	2	2	5	3	**2**	0.0	0	0	0	0	0	0.0	0	0	0
2014	DEN	1	1	4	4	0	0.0	0	0	0	0	0	0.0	0	0	1
2015	DEN	3	3	**14**	**13**	1	0.0	0	0	0	0	0	0.0	0	0	**6**
2018	LAR	3	3	13	11	**2**	0.0	**1**	0	0	0	0	0.0	0	0	0
Career		11	11	46	40	6	0.0	1	0	0	0	0	0.0	0	0	8

=== Buccaneers franchise records ===
- Most interceptions in a game – 3 (tied with Ronde Barber and Andrew Adams)

== Personal life ==
On March 26, 2016, Talib married his girlfriend of over seven years, Gypsy Benitez, in a ceremony outside of Dallas, Texas. Teammates from the Denver Broncos and New England Patriots attended, although the Broncos defeated the Patriots in the AFC Championship two months prior. The couple have two children together.

Talib cites Michael Irvin and Deion Sanders as his favorite players as a child.

Talib has a nephew name Yamil who plays as a defensive lineman for the Colorado Buffaloes.

=== Legal issues ===
Talib had several conduct-related issues during his NFL career. At the NFL rookie symposium in July 2008, Talib was involved in a fistfight with fellow Buccaneers rookie Cory Boyd.

On August 20, 2009, Talib allegedly battered a taxi driver and he was arrested by Florida Highway Patrol and booked into the Pinellas County jail, charged with resisting arrest without violence and simple battery.

In March 2011, police in Garland, Texas, issued a felony warrant for Talib for aggravated assault with a deadly weapon after he was accused of firing a gun at his sister's boyfriend. He was later released on $25,000 bond. Talib was indicted on the charge in May 2011. On June 18, 2012, the charges were dropped due to insufficient evidence and credibility concerns with the accuser.

In the early morning of June 5, 2016, Talib claimed to have been shot in the leg while outside a Dallas strip club. He was released from the hospital the same day. It was later revealed that Talib falsified the report, having actually shot himself in the leg and lied to police, and that, while intoxicated, he never was at the strip club in question.

In August 2022, Talib's brother, Yaqub Talib, was sought by police in Lancaster, Texas, on a murder warrant after he fled the fatal shooting of youth football coach Michael Hickmon. He turned himself in to the authorities two days later, and was eventually sentenced to 37 years in prison. Youth football coaching staff and officials had gotten into a disagreement that became physical, resulting in Yaqub shooting Hickmon. Witnesses said Aqib Talib had started the brawl that led to the fatal shooting of Hickmon.

== See also ==
- 2015 Denver Broncos season
