= Michael Buchanan (gridiron football) =

American football player (born 1991)

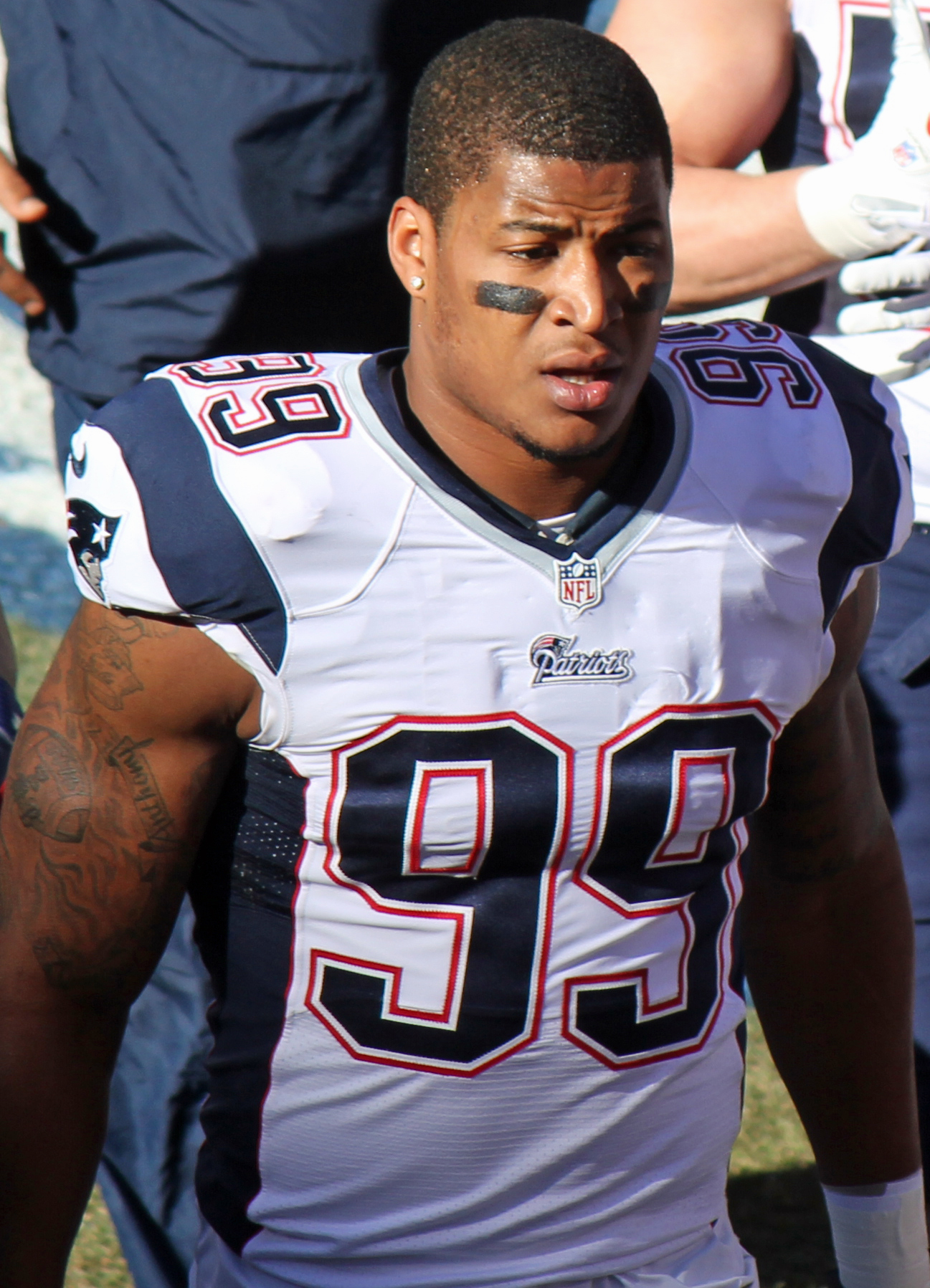
- Buchanan with the New England Patriots in 2013

No. 99
- Position: Defensive end

Personal information
- Born: January 24, 1991 (age 35); Chicago, Illinois, U.S.
- Listed height: 6 ft 6 in (1.98 m)
- Listed weight: 255 lb (116 kg)

Career information
- High school: Homewood-Flossmoor (Flossmoor, Illinois)
- College: Illinois
- NFL draft: 2013: 7th round, 226th overall pick

Career history
- New England Patriots (2013–2014); Buffalo Bills (2015)*; BC Lions (2015)*; Toronto Argonauts (2016)*; Edmonton Eskimos (2016)
- * Offseason or practice squad member only

Awards and highlights
- Super Bowl champion (XLIX); 2× Second-team All-Big Ten (2011, 2012)

Career NFL statistics
- Total tackles: 11
- Sacks: 2
- Stats at Pro Football Reference
- Stats at CFL.ca

Michael Anthony Buchanan, Jr. (born January 24, 1991) is an American former professional football player who was a defensive end for the New England Patriots of the National Football League (NFL). He was selected by the Patriots in the seventh round of the 2013 NFL draft. He played college football for the Illinois Fighting Illini.

== Early life ==
He attended Homewood-Flossmoor High School. He was selected to the Champaign News-Gazette All-State team. He was a four-star recruit according to Rivals.com. He also was ranked as the 14th defensive end prospect nationally by Rivals.com. He was ranked as the 59th overall prospect in the Midwest by SuperPrep. He also was ranked as a top-100 defensive end overall prospect by ESPNU. He chose Illinois over Purdue and Vanderbilt.

== College career ==
He was selected to the Second-team All-Big Ten in 2011 and 2012 seasons. In his senior season, he was selected to the Illinois Fighting Illini's Outstanding Defensive Player and Defensive Lineman at annual postseason banquet.

== Professional career ==
Pre-draft measurables
Height	Weight	Arm length	Hand span	40-yard dash	10-yard split	20-yard split	20-yard shuttle	Three-cone drill	Vertical jump	Broad jump	Bench press
6 ft 5 3/8 in (1.97 m)	255 lb (116 kg)	34 in (0.86 m)	9 7/8 in (0.25 m)	4.78 s	1.65 s	2.76 s	4.44 s	6.91 s	33.0 in (0.84 m)	9 ft 5 in (2.87 m)	22 reps
All values from NFL Combine

=== New England Patriots ===
Buchanan was selected in the seventh round (226th overall) by the New England Patriots of the NFL. The Patriots originally obtained the selection used to draft Buchanan in a trade that sent Aqib Talib to the Patriots. During the two years with the Patriots, Buchanan played in 18 games recording 9 tackles, five quarterback hits, and 2 sacks. On October 6, 2014, Buchanan was placed on Injured reserve for the rest of the 2014 season including the Patriots win over the Seattle Seahawks in Super Bowl XLIX.

=== Buffalo Bills ===
On June 2, 2015, the NFL's Buffalo Bills announced the signing of defensive end/linebacker Michael Buchanan. On August 31, 2015, he was released by the Bills.

=== BC Lions ===
On October 13, 2015, Buchanan was signed to the practice roster of the BC Lions of the Canadian Football League (CFL). On November 10, 2015, he was released by the Lions.

=== Toronto Argonauts ===
On July 17, 2016, Buchanan was signed as a free agent by the Toronto Argonauts of the CFL. In August 2016, the team released Buchanan.

=== Edmonton Eskimos ===
Buchanan was signed to the practice roster of the Edmonton Eskimos on August 23, 2016. He played in five games for the Eskimos in 2016. He was released on February 23, 2017.

== Personal life ==
He is the son of Michael Buchanan Sr., and Lolita Jordan.
