= List of 2017 NFL draft early entrants =

The list of 2017 NFL draft early entrants is a list of college football players that declared for the 2017 NFL draft that had remaining years of NCAA eligibility. The list includes the year of college they declared as eligible for the draft, the pick they were selected at and the team that drafted them. A total of 103 players declared as eligible, 81 were drafted and 22 were undrafted.

== Complete list of players ==
The following players were granted special eligibility to enter the 2017 draft:

Name	Position	School	Year	Round	Pick	Team
Alex Anzalone	LB	Florida	(redshirt) Junior	3	76	New Orleans Saints
Jamal Adams	S	LSU	Junior	1	6	New York Jets
Budda Baker	S	Washington	Junior	2	36	Arizona Cardinals
Derek Barnett	DE	Tennessee	Junior	1	14	Philadelphia Eagles
Garett Bolles	OT	Utah	Junior	1	20	Denver Broncos
Caleb Brantley	DT	Florida	(redshirt) Junior	6	185	Cleveland Browns
Noah Brown	WR	Ohio State	(redshirt) Junior	7	239	Dallas Cowboys
K. D. Cannon	WR	Baylor	Junior	Undrafted		
Taco Charlton	DE	Michigan	(redshirt) Junior	1	28	Dallas Cowboys
Devin Childress	WR	North Park	Junior	Undrafted		
Michael Clark	WR	Marshall	(redshirt) Sophomore	Undrafted		
Gareon Conley	CB	Ohio State	Junior	1	24	Oakland Raiders
James Conner	RB	Pittsburgh	(redshirt) Junior	3	105	Pittsburgh Steelers
Dalvin Cook	RB	Florida State	(redshirt) Junior	2	41	Minnesota Vikings
Zach Cunningham	LB	Vanderbilt	(redshirt) Junior	2	57	Houston Texans
Malachi Dupre	WR	LSU	Junior	7	247	Green Bay Packers
Ukeme Eligwe	LB	Georgia Southern	(redshirt) Junior	5	183	Kansas City Chiefs
Jerod Evans	QB	Virginia Tech	(redshirt) Junior	Undrafted		
D'Onta Foreman	RB	Texas	Junior	3	89	Houston Texans
Leonard Fournette	RB	LSU	Junior	1	4	Jacksonville Jaguars
Wayne Gallman	RB	Clemson	(redshirt) Junior	4	140	New York Giants
Jermaine Grace	LB	Miami (FL)	Junior	Undrafted		
Myles Garrett	DE	Texas A&M	(redshirt) Sophomore	1	1	Cleveland Browns
Shelton Gibson	WR	West Virginia	(redshirt) Junior	5	166	Philadelphia Eagles
Davon Godchaux	DL	LSU	Junior	5	178	Miami Dolphins
Chris Godwin	WR	Penn State	Junior	3	84	Tampa Bay Buccaneers
Derrick Griffin	WR	Texas Southern	(redshirt) Sophomore	Undrafted		
Chad Hansen	WR	California	(redshirt) Junior	4	141	New York Jets
Charles Harris	DE	Missouri	(redshirt) Junior	1	22	Miami Dolphins
Carlos Henderson	WR	Louisiana Tech	(redshirt) Junior	3	82	Denver Broncos
Brian Hill	RB	Wyoming	Junior	5	156	Atlanta Falcons
Marlon Humphrey	CB	Alabama	(redshirt) Sophomore	1	16	Baltimore Ravens
Bucky Hodges	TE	Virginia Tech	(redshirt) Sophomore	6	201	Minnesota Vikings
Elijah Hood	RB	North Carolina	Junior	7	242	Oakland Raiders
Malik Hooker	S	Ohio State	(redshirt) Sophomore	1	15	Indianapolis Colts
Adoree' Jackson	CB	USC	Junior	1	18	Tennessee Titans
Roderick Johnson	OT	Florida State	Junior	5	160	Cleveland Browns
Aaron Jones	RB	UTEP	(redshirt) Junior	5	182	Green Bay Packers
Josh Jones	S	NC State	Junior	2	61	Green Bay Packers
Nazair Jones	DT	North Carolina	(redshirt) Junior	3	102	Seattle Seahawks
Sidney Jones	CB	Washington	Junior	2	43	Philadelphia Eagles
Brad Kaaya (Note: Hoyt, Joseph (January 4, 2016). "Miami quarterback Brad Kaaya declares for NFL draft". Daily Emerald.)	QB	Miami	(redshirt) Junior	6	215	Detroit Lions
Alvin Kamara	RB	Tennessee	(redshirt) Junior	3	67	New Orleans Saints
DeShone Kizer	QB	Notre Dame	Junior	2	52	Cleveland Browns
Jerome Lane Jr.	WR	Akron	(redshirt) Junior	Undrafted		
Marshon Lattimore	CB	Ohio State	(redshirt) Sophomore	1	11	New Orleans Saints
Carl Lawson	DE	Auburn	(redshirt) Junior	4	116	Cincinnati Bengals
Elijah Lee	LB	Kansas State	Junior	7	232	Minnesota Vikings
Marlon Mack	RB	South Florida	Junior	4	143	Indianapolis Colts
Patrick Mahomes	QB	Texas Tech	(redshirt) Junior	1	10	Kansas City Chiefs
Josh Malone	WR	Tennessee	Junior	4	128	Cincinnati Bengals
Damien Mama	OG	USC	Junior	Undrafted		
Christian McCaffrey	RB	Stanford	Junior	1	8	Carolina Panthers
Malik McDowell	DL	Michigan State	(redshirt) Sophomore	2	35	Seattle Seahawks
Isaiah McKenzie	WR	Georgia	Junior	5	172	Denver Broncos
Deon-Tay McManus	WR	Marshall	(redshirt) Junior	Undrafted		
Raekwon McMillan	LB	Ohio State	(redshirt) Junior	2	54	Miami Dolphins
Jeremy McNichols	RB	Boise State	Junior	5	162	Tampa Bay Buccaneers
Joe Mixon	RB	Oklahoma	(redshirt) Sophomore	2	48	Cincinnati Bengals
Al-Quadin Muhammad	DE	Miami (FL)	(redshirt) Junior	6	196	New Orleans Saints
Montae Nicholson	S	Michigan State	Junior	4	123	Washington Redskins
David Njoku	TE	Miami (FL)	(redshirt) Sophomore	1	29	Cleveland Browns
Speedy Noil	WR	Texas A&M	(redshirt) Junior	Undrafted		
Marcus Oliver	LB	Indiana	(redshirt) Junior	Undrafted		
Samaje Perine	RB	Oklahoma	Junior	4	114	Washington Redskins
Elijah Qualls	DL	Washington	(redshirt) Junior	6	214	Philadelphia Eagles
Ryan Ramczyk	OT	Wisconsin	(redshirt) Junior	1	32	New Orleans Saints
Devine Redding	RB	Indiana	Junior	Undrafted		
Cam Robinson	OT	Alabama	Junior	2	34	Jacksonville Jaguars
John Ross	WR	Washington	(redshirt) Junior	1	9	Cincinnati Bengals
Travis Rudolph	WR	Florida State	Junior	Undrafted		
Artavis Scott	WR	Clemson	(redshirt) Junior	Undrafted		
Ricky Seals-Jones	WR	Texas A&M	(redshirt) Junior	Undrafted		
Adam Shaheen	TE	Ashland	Junior	2	45	Chicago Bears
David Sharpe	OL	Florida	Junior	4	129	Oakland Raiders
Garrett Sickels	DE	Penn State	Junior	Undrafted		
JuJu Smith-Schuster	WR	USC	Junior	2	62	Pittsburgh Steelers
ArDarius Stewart	WR	Alabama	Junior	3	79	New York Jets
Damore'ea Stringfellow	WR	Ole Miss	(redshirt) Junior	Undrafted		
Teez Tabor	CB	Florida	Junior	2	53	Detroit Lions
Vincent Taylor	DT	Oklahoma State	(redshirt) Junior	6	194	Miami Dolphins
Solomon Thomas	DL	Stanford	(redshirt) Sophomore	1	3	San Francisco 49ers
Mitch Trubisky	QB	North Carolina	(redshirt) Junior	1	2	Chicago Bears
Eddie Vanderdoes	DL	UCLA	(redshirt) Junior	3	88	Oakland Raiders
Anthony Walker Jr.	LB	Northwestern	(redshirt) Junior	5	161	Indianapolis Colts
Charles Walker	DL	Oklahoma	(redshirt) Sophomore	Undrafted		
Khari Waithe-Alexander	DE	Southern Illinois	(redshirt) Junior	Undrafted		
Deshaun Watson (Note: Hoyt, Joseph (January 4, 2016). "Clemson quarterback Deshaun Watson declares for NFL draft". Daily Emerald.)	QB	Clemson	Junior	1	12	Houston Texans
T. J. Watt	LB	Wisconsin	(redshirt) Junior	1	30	Pittsburgh Steelers
Marcus Williams	S	Utah	Junior	2	42	New Orleans Saints
Mike Williams	WR	Clemson	(redshirt) Junior	1	7	Los Angeles Chargers
Stanley Williams	RB	Kentucky	Junior	Undrafted		
Howard Wilson	CB	Houston	(redshirt) Sophomore	4	126	Cleveland Browns
Quincy Wilson	CB	Florida	Junior	2	46	Indianapolis Colts
Joseph Yearby	RB	Miami (FL)	(redshirt) Junior	Undrafted		
Ishmael Zamora	WR	Baylor	(redshirt) Sophomore	Undrafted		
