= Justin Francis (American football) =

American football player (born 1989)

No. 23
- Position: Defensive end

Personal information
- Born: February 8, 1989 (age 37); Opa-locka, Florida, U.S.
- Listed height: 6 ft 2 in (1.88 m)
- Listed weight: 270 lb (122 kg)

Career information
- High school: Miramar (Miramar, Florida)
- College: Rutgers (2007–2011)
- NFL draft: 2012: undrafted

Career history
- New England Patriots (2012); Portland Steel (2016)*; Nebraska Danger (2016)
- * Offseason or practice squad member only
- Stats at Pro Football Reference

Justin Francis (born February 8, 1989), is an American former professional football player who was a defensive end for the New England Patriots of the National Football League (NFL). He played college football for the Rutgers Scarlet Knights and went un-drafted in the 2012 NFL draft. He was later signed in 2012 as a free agent with the Patriots.
