= Tracy Howard =

American football player (born 1994)

Profile
- Position: Safety

Personal information
- Born: April 29, 1994 (age 32); Miramar, Florida, U.S.
- Listed height: 5 ft 10 in (1.78 m)
- Listed weight: 185 lb (84 kg)

Career information
- High school: Miramar
- College: Miami (FL)
- NFL draft: 2016: undrafted

Career history
- Cleveland Browns (2016); Jacksonville Jaguars (2017)*; Miami Dolphins (2017–2018)*
- * Offseason or practice squad member only

Career NFL statistics
- Total tackles: 20
- Pass deflections: 1
- Return yards: 111
- Stats at Pro Football Reference

Tracy Howard Jr. (born April 29, 1994) is an American former professional football player who was a safety in the National Football League (NFL). He played college football for the Miami Hurricanes. Howard signed with the Cleveland Browns as an undrafted free agent in 2016.

== Early life ==
A native of Miramar, Florida, Howard attended Miramar High School. Playing wide receiver as a freshman, he was one of the targets of quarterback Geno Smith. He was converted to defensive back in his sophomore year and remained at that position. Regarded as a five-star recruit by Rivals.com, Howard was listed as the No. 1 cornerback prospect in his class.

== College career ==
Howard played college football at the University of Miami.

== Professional career ==
Pre-draft measurables
Height	Weight	Arm length	Hand span	40-yard dash	10-yard split	20-yard split	20-yard shuttle	Three-cone drill	Vertical jump	Broad jump	Bench press
5 ft 10 1/8 in (1.78 m)	183 lb (83 kg)	31 3/8 in (0.80 m)	9 in (0.23 m)	4.60 s	1.59 s	2.63 s	4.43 s	7.30 s	36.0 in (0.91 m)	10 ft 2 in (3.10 m)	14 reps
All values from Pro Day

=== Cleveland Browns ===
After going undrafted in the 2016 NFL draft, Howard signed with the Cleveland Browns on May 5, 2016. He played in 15 games with three starts recording 20 tackles and one pass defended.

On April 20, 2017, Howard was released by the Browns.

=== Jacksonville Jaguars ===
On April 21, 2017, Howard was claimed off waivers by the Jacksonville Jaguars. He was waived on September 2, 2017, and was signed to the practice squad the next day. He was released on September 8, 2017.

=== Miami Dolphins ===
On December 21, 2017, Howard was signed to the Miami Dolphins' practice squad. He signed a reserve/future contract with the Dolphins on January 1, 2018. He was waived by the Dolphins on May 10, 2018, with a failed physical.
