= Herb Miller =

American football player (born 1997)

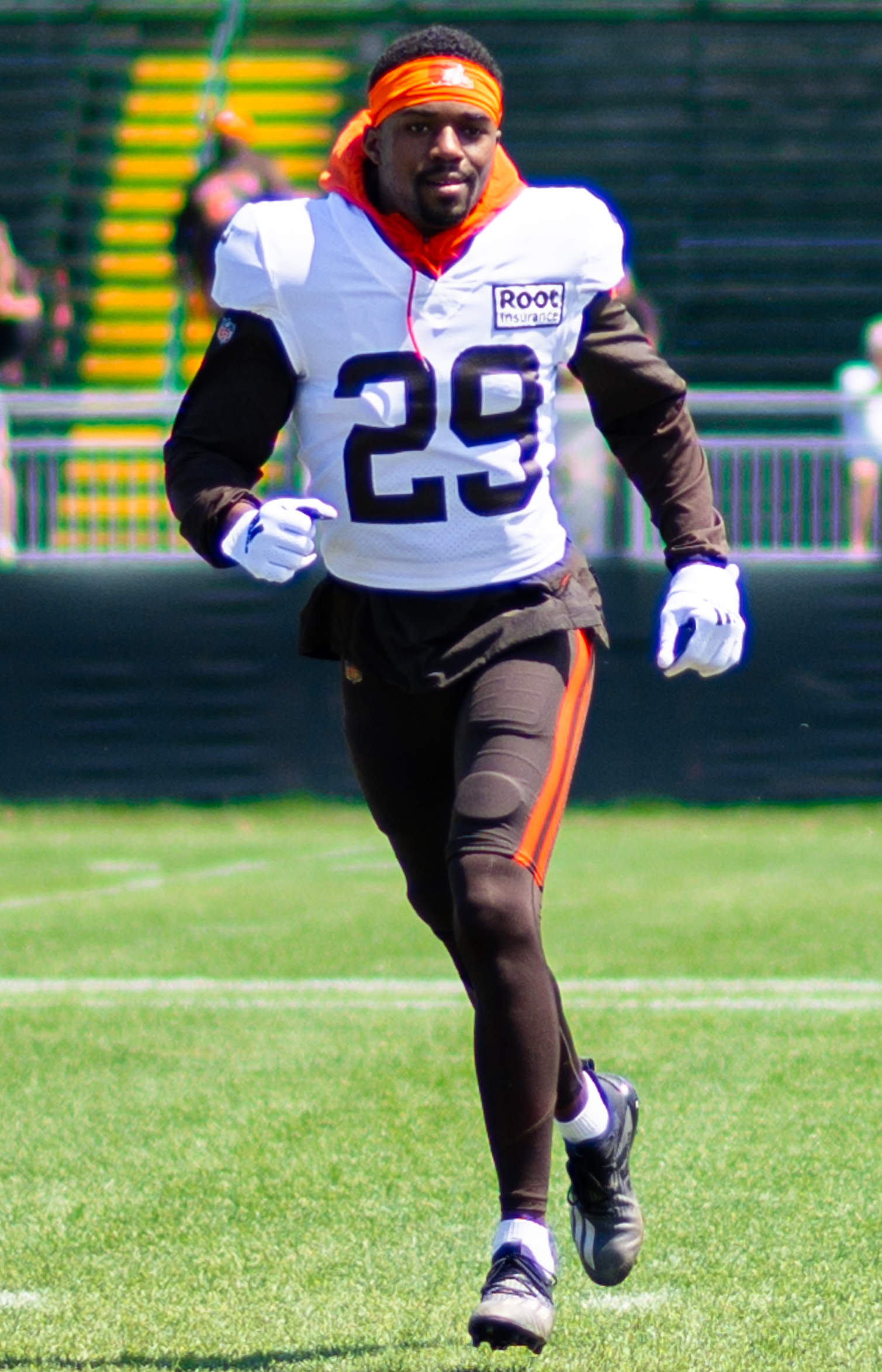
- Miller with the Cleveland Browns in 2022

No. 36, 29
- Position: Cornerback

Personal information
- Born: November 11, 1997 (age 28); Miramar, Florida, U.S.
- Listed height: 6 ft 1 in (1.85 m)
- Listed weight: 201 lb (91 kg)

Career information
- High school: Miramar
- College: Florida Atlantic (2015–2018)
- NFL draft: 2019: undrafted

Career history
- Kansas City Chiefs (2019)*; Tampa Bay Buccaneers (2019–2021); Cleveland Browns (2021–2022); Carolina Panthers (2023)*; Buffalo Bills (2023)*
- * Offseason or practice squad member only

Awards and highlights
- Super Bowl champion (LV)

Career NFL statistics
- Total tackles: 11
- Fumble recoveries: 1
- Pass deflections: 1
- Interceptions: 1
- Stats at Pro Football Reference

Herbert Miller III (born November 11, 1997) is an American former professional football player who was a cornerback in the National Football League (NFL). He played college football for the Florida Atlantic Owls.

== Professional career ==
Pre-draft measurables
Height	Weight	Arm length	Hand span	40-yard dash	10-yard split	20-yard split	20-yard shuttle	Three-cone drill	Vertical jump	Broad jump	Bench press
6 ft 1 1/4 in (1.86 m)	190 lb (86 kg)	30 3/4 in (0.78 m)	9 3/4 in (0.25 m)	4.57 s	1.59 s	2.55 s	4.24 s	7.25 s	32.5 in (0.83 m)	9 ft 11 in (3.02 m)	13 reps
All values from Pro Day

=== Kansas City Chiefs ===
Miller was signed by the Kansas City Chiefs as a undrafted free agent on May 7, 2019, after participating in a tryout with the team. He was waived by the Chiefs on August 31, 2019, during final roster cuts.

=== Tampa Bay Buccaneers ===
Miller was signed to the Tampa Bay Buccaneers' practice squad on December 18, 2019. The Buccaneers signed him to a reserve/futures contract on January 7, 2020. He was waived during final roster cuts on September 5, 2020, but was re-signed to the Buccaneers' practice squad the next day. He was elevated to the active roster on November 28, December 12, December 25, and January 2, 2021, for the team's weeks 12, 14, 16, and 17 games against the Chiefs, Minnesota Vikings, Detroit Lions, and Atlanta Falcons, and reverted to the practice squad after each game. Against the Lions, Miller recorded his first career interception off a pass thrown by David Blough during the 47–7 win. He was elevated again to the active roster on January 8 for the team's wild card game against the Washington Football Team, and reverted to the practice squad again following the game. Miller earned a Super Bowl championship when the Buccaneers won Super Bowl LV over the Chiefs.

On February 9, 2021, Miller re-signed with the Buccaneers. Miller was waived by the Buccaneers on August 31, 2021, but re-signed with the team as part of their practice squad the next day. He was released from the team's practice squad on September 20, 2021.

=== Cleveland Browns ===
Miller was signed to the Cleveland Browns practice squad on September 28, 2021. Miller was elevated to the Browns' active roster on October 16, 2021, and reverted to the practice squad on October 18, 2021. Miller was elevated to the Browns' active roster a second time on October 21, 2021, prior to their game that evening, and reverted to their practice squad the following day. The Browns signed Miller to their active roster on October 29, 2021. He was waived on November 8, 2021, and re-signed to the Browns' practice squad on November 10, 2021. Miller was elevated yet again to the Browns' active roster on November 13, 2021. He was elevated to the active roster again on November 20, 2021. Miller was elevated to the active roster again on December 11, 2021. Miller was elevated to the Browns' active roster once again as a COVID-19 replacement player on December 24, 2021.

The Browns signed Miller to a reserve/futures contract on January 13, 2022. He was waived on August 30, 2022. The Browns signed Miller to their practice squad on August 31, 2022. Miller was signed to the Browns' active roster on September 9, 2022. He was waived four days later and re-signed to the practice squad. He was promoted back to the active roster on October 31. He was waived on November 7, and re-signed to the practice squad.

=== Carolina Panthers ===
On January 10, 2023, Miller signed a reserve/future contract with the Carolina Panthers. He was waived on August 29, 2023.

=== Buffalo Bills ===
On October 3, 2023, Miller was signed to the Buffalo Bills practice squad, following an injury to Buffalo cornerback Tre'Davious White. He was released on December 28.
