= Miramar High School =

Charter High School in Pembroke Pines, Florida, United States, 33010

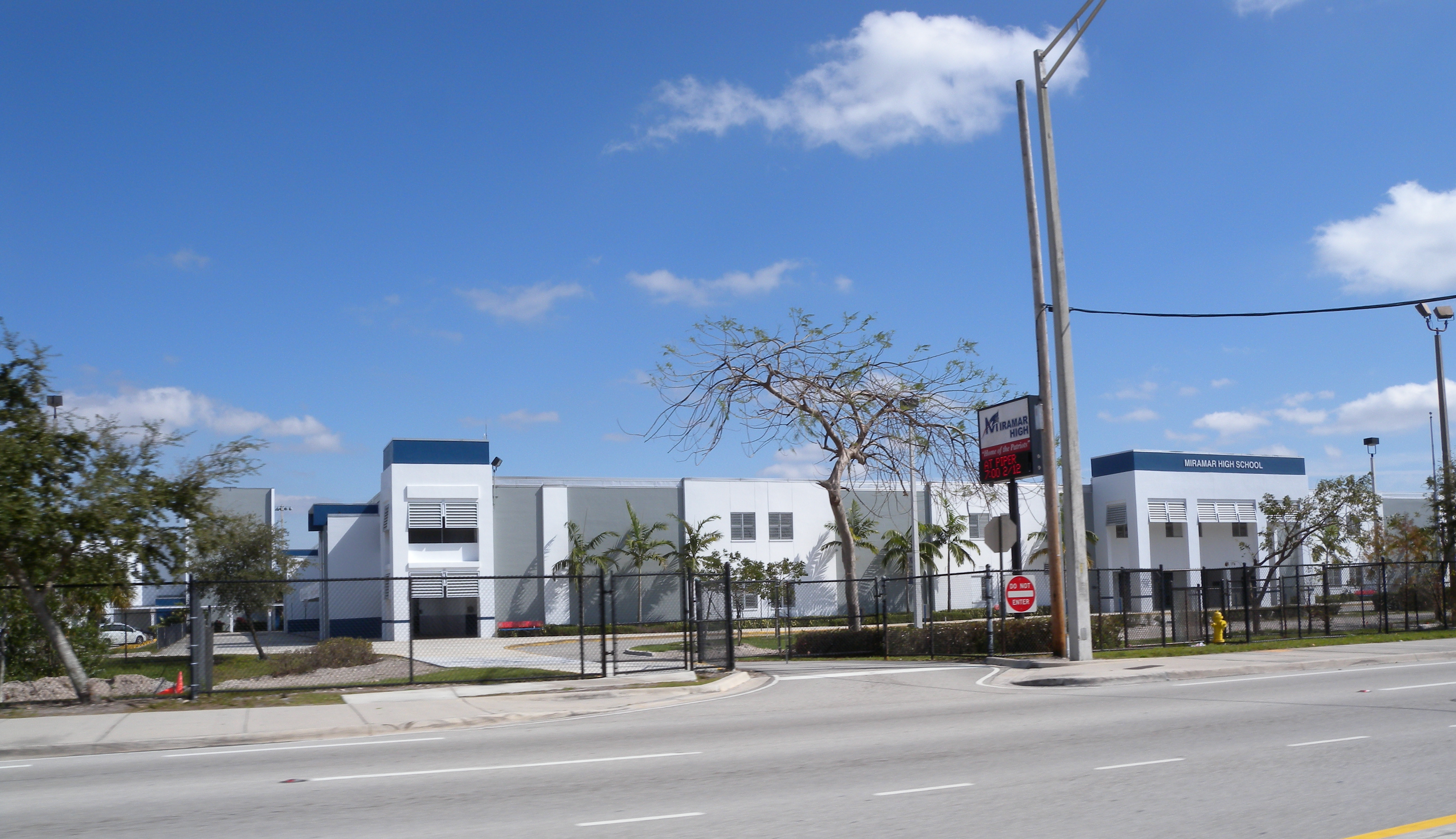

Location
- 3601 Southwest 89th Avenue; Miramar, Florida 33025; United States; 25°58′34″N 80°15′43″W

Information
- Type: Public
- Motto: "Where Dreams Can Take Massive Flight"
- Established: 1968
- School district: Broward County Charter Schools
- Superintendent: Howard Hepburn
- Principal: Winfred Porter
- Staff: 79.53 (on an FTE basis)
- Grades: 9–12
- Enrollment: 1,951 (2023–2024)
- Student to teacher ratio: 24.53
- Campus: Suburban
- Colors: Red; White; Blue
- Nickname: Patriots
- Website: miramarhigh.browardschools.com

Miramar High School is a public high school located in Miramar, Florida, United States. The school opened in 1970 and serves students residing in southwest Broward County; however, magnet students may hail from elsewhere in the county.

Miramar High School serves grades 9 through 12. The school houses two magnet programs: an aviation program and the International Baccalaureate program. Miramar has an FCAT school grade of "A" for the academic year ending 2011, up from "B" the year before.

== Athletics ==
=== Soccer ===
Miramar High established Broward County's first boys' soccer program in 1974 though 1980.

=== Football ===
==== Miramar-Flanagan Brawl (2007) ====
On September 28, 2007, at Miramar High's stadium, a bench-clearing brawl between seated, rival footballers interrupted the Miramar-Flanagan football game; this was Broward County's largest on-field brawl. A referee stopped the game to prevent further outbreaks on the field and eruptions in the bleachers.

Following the interruption of the game, a film of the occurrence was sent to the Florida High School Athletic Association (FHSAA) to decide the fate of the belligerent parties. The FHSAA suspended 28 Miramar players and 26 Flanagan players from playing. In addition, the State of Florida fined both schools a total of $12,150, and neither school was allowed to participate in the 2008 Spring Jamboree or the 2008 Fall Pre-season Jamboree.

The game resumed on October 29, 2007, in an empty Lockhart Stadium with five minutes remaining in the third quarter and with Miramar leading 20–7. The game was played without the 54 suspended players. This incident is thought to be the largest mass-suspension in state high school history.

==== State Championship (2009) ====
Miramar High School won their first State Championship title on Dec 19, 2009. Miramar High School beat DeLand High School of DeLand, Florida 42–20. Quarterback Ryan Williams set a state championship game record with 5 TD passes and a completion percentage record of .857, going 18 of 21 for 254 yards. Miramar High was the first team from Broward County to win a 6A state championship and the first in the county to win in the largest classification since Hollywood Hills won 4A in 1973.

Miramar High's athletic rival is Everglades High School.

== Demographics ==
As of the 2025-2026 school year, the total student enrollment was 5,017. The ethnic makeup of the school was 15.3% White, 56.3% Black, 43.7% Hispanic, 1.8% Asian, 1.9% Multiracial, 0.2% Native American or Alaskan Natives, and 0.3% Hawaiian or Pacific Islander.

== Notable alumni ==
- Stedman Bailey (2009) - NFL wide receiver
- Jesse Bendross - NFL wide receiver
- Dean Biasucci - National Football League (NFL) placekicker
- Yodny Cajuste (2014) - NFL offensive tackle
- Clarence Coleman (1998) - NFL wide receiver
- Trevon Coley (2012) - NFL defensive tackle
- Johnny Depp - actor
- Justin Francis (2007) - NFL defensive end
- Jermaine Grace (2013) - NFL linebacker
- Myles Harden (2020) - NFL cornerback
- Tracy Howard (2012) - NFL defensive back
- Shemar Jean-Charles (2016) - NFL cornerback
- Kahlil Lewis (2015) - XFL wide receiver
- Malcolm Lewis (2012) - NFL wide receiver
- Herb Miller (2015) - NFL cornerback
- Desmond Reid (2022) - NFL running back
- Geno Smith (2009) - NFL quarterback
- Yung Miami - rapper
