= Jermaine Grace =

American football player (born 1993)

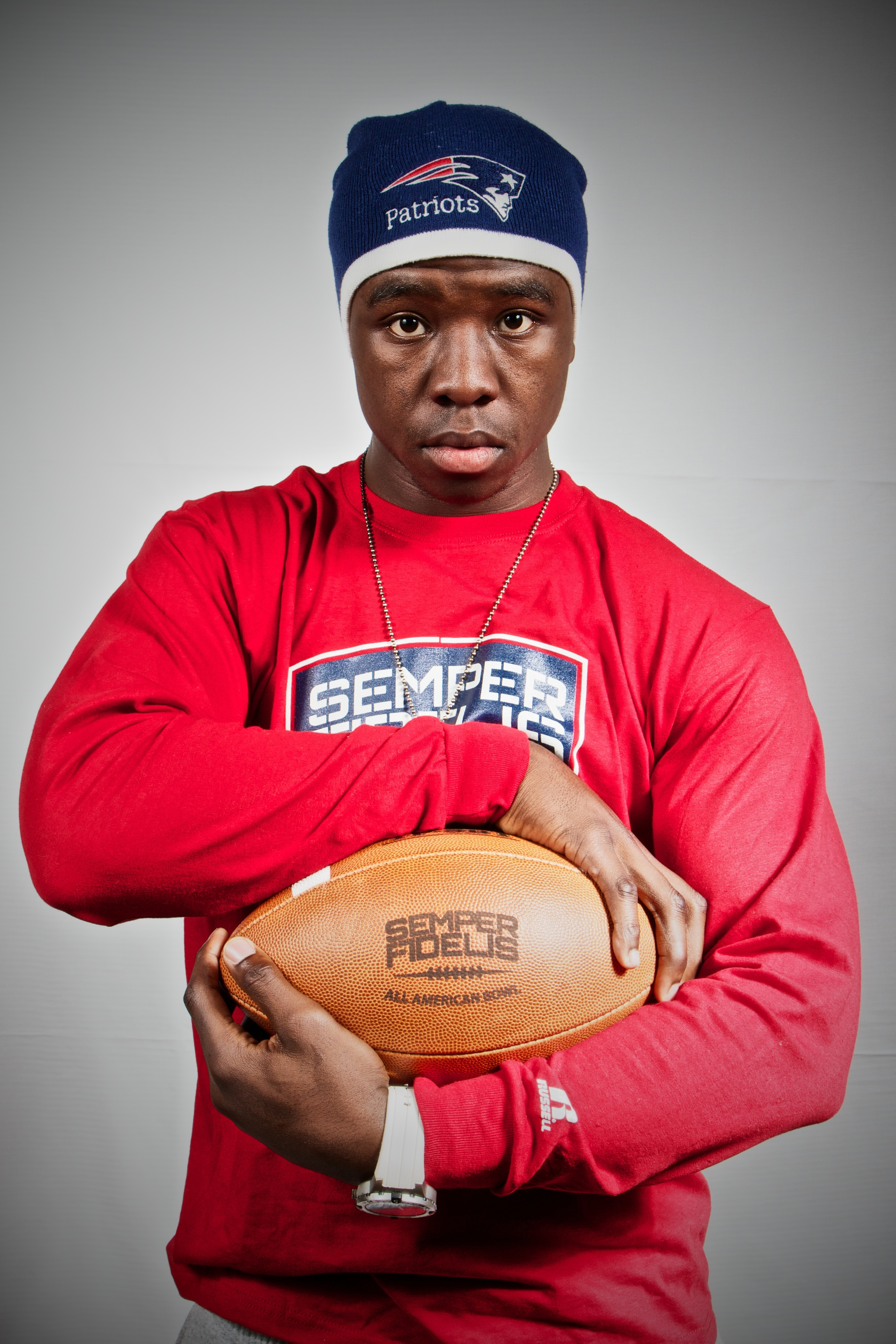
- Grace in 2012

No. 00
- Position: Linebacker

Personal information
- Born: November 8, 1993 (age 33); Hollywood, Florida, U.S.
- Listed height: 6 ft 0 in (1.83 m)
- Listed weight: 223 lb (101 kg)

Career information
- High school: Miramar (Miramar, Florida)
- College: Miami (FL)
- NFL draft: 2017: undrafted

Career history
- Atlanta Falcons (2017); Indianapolis Colts (2017); Cleveland Browns (2018)*; Seattle Seahawks (2018); Atlanta Falcons (2018–2019); Seattle Seahawks (2019)*; Cleveland Browns (2019–2020)*; New York Giants (2020)*; Montreal Alouettes (2021)
- * Offseason or practice squad member only

Career NFL statistics
- Total tackles: 9
- Stats at Pro Football Reference
- Stats at CFL.ca

Jermaine Grace (born November 8, 1993) is an American former professional football player who was a linebacker in the National Football League (NFL) and Canadian Football League (CFL). He played college football for the Miami Hurricanes.

== Early life ==
Grace attended Miramar High School in Miramar, Florida. He was rated four-stars by ESPNU, 247Sports and Rivals, and was ranked as the 11th best linebacker nationally by ESPN.

== College career ==
Grace committed to Miami over Tennessee and Louisville. Most of Grace’s contributions during his freshman year came from playing on special teams. In 2015, he led the team with 79 tackles and 6 tackles for loss. Grace along with teammate Al-Quadin Muhammad became entangled in a luxury rental car scandal that resulted in them being dismissed from the school, since it was a violation of NCAA rules.

== Professional career ==
Pre-draft measurables
Height	Weight	Arm length	Hand span	40-yard dash	10-yard split	20-yard split	20-yard shuttle	Three-cone drill	Vertical jump	Broad jump	Bench press
6 ft 0 1/8 in (1.83 m)	223 lb (101 kg)	31 3/4 in (0.81 m)	9 7/8 in (0.25 m)	4.57 s	1.61 s	2.59 s	4.37 s	7.37 s	33.0 in (0.84 m)	10 ft 0 in (3.05 m)	21 reps
All values from Pro Day

=== Atlanta Falcons (first stint) ===
Grace signed with the Atlanta Falcons as an undrafted free agent on April 29, 2017. He made the Falcons' final roster, playing in five games before being waived on November 14, 2017.

=== Indianapolis Colts ===
On November 15, 2017, Grace was claimed off waivers by the Indianapolis Colts. He was waived by the Colts on May 1, 2018.

=== Cleveland Browns (first stint) ===
After being waived by the Colts, Grace was claimed off waivers by the Cleveland Browns on May 2, 2018. He was waived on September 2, 2018.

=== Seattle Seahawks (first stint) ===
On September 3, 2018, Grace was claimed off waivers by the Seattle Seahawks. He was waived/injured on September 14, 2018 and was placed on injured reserve. He was released on October 15. 2018.

=== Atlanta Falcons (second stint) ===
On October 18, 2018, Grace was signed to the Atlanta Falcons practice squad. He signed a reserve/future contract with the Falcons on December 31, 2018.

On November 29, 2019, Grace was waived by the Falcons.

=== Seattle Seahawks (second stint) ===
On December 5, 2019, Grace was signed to the Seattle Seahawks practice squad. He was released by the Seahawks on December 17, 2019.

=== Cleveland Browns (second stint) ===
Grace was signed to the Cleveland Browns' practice squad on December 19, 2019. The Browns signed Grace to their reserve/futures list on December 30, 2019. He was waived on July 31, 2020.

=== New York Giants ===
On September 22, 2020, Grace was signed to the New York Giants practice squad, but was released two days later.

=== Montreal Alouettes ===
Grace signed with the Montreal Alouettes of the CFL on June 9, 2021. He was released on September 29, 2021.
