= Miramar Regional Park Amphitheater =

Large amphitheater in Miramar, Florida

Coordinates: 25.9858°N 80.3720°W

The Miramar Regional Park Amphitheater is an entertainment venue in Miramar, Florida, United States. The amphitheater is open-air and includes a 90-foot-high canopy which covers a 25,000 square feet. It received an International Achievement Award for tensile structures. It was built as an addition to Miramar Regional Park, hosting regional events such as 2026 FIFA World Cup Watch Parties.

== Purpose ==
The amphitheater was built as an entertainment venue for Miramar. It was meant to host 15 large events and generate $500,000 in profit each year.

== Construction ==
The amphitheater was finished in 2016 and opened in 2017. The project cost $7.4 million in total, of which construction accounted for $5,780,200. The canopy cost $2 million.

== Architecture ==
The amphitheater is over 90 feet high and designed with a structure including two cones. The supporting structure starts from a height of 11.5 feet and peaks at 47 feet. It hosts 3,000 seats under the canopy's 25,000 square feet of grass, and has room for 2,000 more seats on its lawn. It was built with a Mediterranean style to fit in with the architecture of South Florida. These cones are pointed at the tip and broaden at the base. It is made of Mehler F-Type PVC, a tensile fabric. The tensile roof is separate from the supporting structure.

== Awards ==
Due to the amphitheater's unique design, being very light yet holding up against hurricane winds, the amphitheater won an International Achievement Award. It won the award for tensile structures over 24,756 square feet.

== Projects ==
On March 19th, 2026, the City of Miramar began a project with the goal of lowering the noise level of performances within the amphitheater. The funding which initiated the project was $274,000, but its total cost is unknown.
