= Geno Smith =

American football player (born 1990)

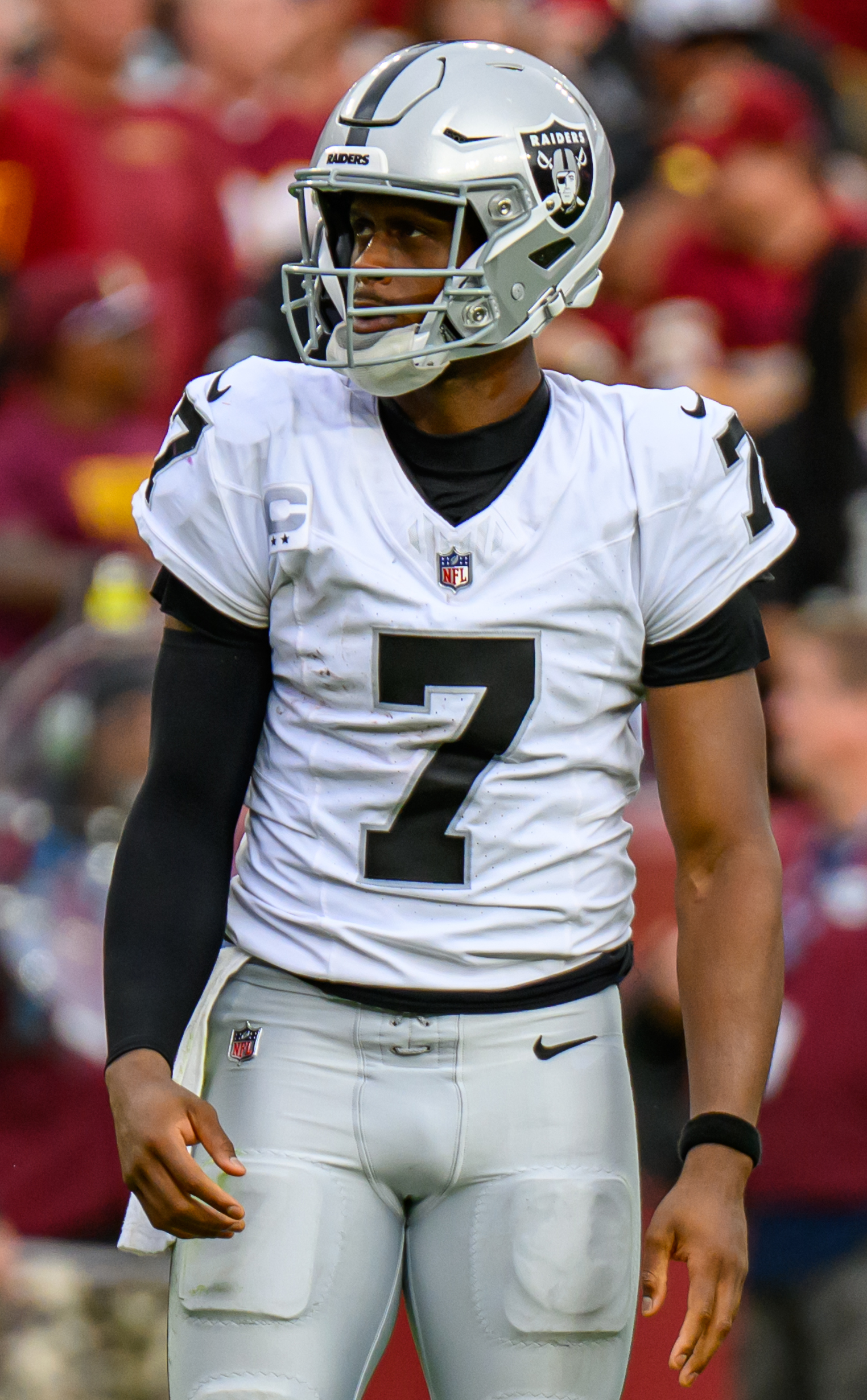
- Smith with the Las Vegas Raiders in 2025

No. 7 – New York Jets
- Position: Quarterback
- Roster status: Active

Personal information
- Born: October 10, 1990 (age 36); Miramar, Florida, U.S.
- Listed height: 6 ft 2 in (1.88 m)
- Listed weight: 221 lb (100 kg)

Career information
- High school: Miramar
- College: West Virginia (2009–2012)
- NFL draft: 2013: 2nd round, 39th overall pick

Career history
- New York Jets (2013–2016); New York Giants (2017); Los Angeles Chargers (2018); Seattle Seahawks (2019–2024); Las Vegas Raiders (2025); New York Jets (2026–present)

Awards and highlights
- NFL Comeback Player of the Year (2022); 2× Pro Bowl (2022, 2023); NFL completion percentage leader (2022); NCAA passing touchdowns leader (2012); First-team All-Big East (2011); Second-team All-Big 12 (2012); Second-team All-Big East (2010)

Career NFL statistics as of Week 10, 2026
- Passing attempts: 3,395
- Passing completions: 2,219
- Completion percentage: 65.4%
- TD–INT: 136–92
- Passing yards: 24,394
- Passer rating: 88.6
- Rushing yards: 1,657
- Rushing touchdowns: 12
- Stats at Pro Football Reference

Eugene Cyril "Geno" Smith III (born October 10, 1990) is an American professional football quarterback for the New York Jets of the National Football League (NFL). He played college football for the West Virginia Mountaineers, receiving first-team All-Big East honors in 2011. Smith was selected by the New York Jets in the second round of the 2013 NFL draft. He spent his first two seasons as the Jets' starter, but inconsistent play and injuries led to him being benched before he was released in 2016. Smith played his next two seasons as a backup with the New York Giants and Los Angeles Chargers.

Joining the Seattle Seahawks in 2019, Smith became the team's starter three years later and had a breakout season, leading Seattle to the playoffs and holding the highest completion percentage in the league. He was named Comeback Player of the Year and earned Pro Bowl honors. Smith played with the Seahawks for two more seasons, earning a second consecutive Pro Bowl selection in 2023. Amid a contract dispute, he was traded in 2025 to the Las Vegas Raiders. He rejoined the Jets the following year.

== Early life ==
Smith was born to high school students Eugene Smith Jr. and Tracy Sellers in Miramar, Florida on October 10, 1990. His family originally hails from Bimini in the Bahamas. His great-uncle, Danny Smith, was a record breaking All-American hurdler at Florida State, and his cousin Mel Bratton was a star running back at Miami in the mid-1980s. Smith's nickname, Geno, came from his grandfather, who was nicknamed "Big Geno".

Smith was admitted to Norland Middle School's magnet program, which dedicated two hours per day to arts instruction. He went on to attend Miramar High School, where he was coached by former Mountaineer Damon Cogdell. As a junior, Smith passed for 2,200 yards, 25 touchdowns, and three interceptions, and was named second-team all-state quarterback. He was also named second-team all-Broward County as an athlete for 2007. Following his junior year, Smith was invited to the prestigious Elite 11 quarterback camp in Aliso Viejo, California.

As a senior, he led his team to the state 6A semi-finals, completing 205 of 338 passes for 3,089 yards and 30 touchdowns and rushing for over 300 yards. Smith was a first-team all-state selection in Florida Class 6A and a Parade All-American. He was also the No. 1 rated player in Broward County according to the Miami Herald and South Florida Sun Sentinel, and finished No. 2 in the voting for Mr. Florida. Smith finished his high school career as the third-best passer in Broward County history, and was named to the ESPN Top 150 prospects list. He chose to attend West Virginia over offers from Florida State, South Florida, Boston College, and Alabama.

College recruiting
Name	Hometown	School	Height	Weight	40^{‡}	Commit date
Eugene Smith; QB	Miramar, Florida	Miramar High School	6 ft 3 in (1.91 m)	184 lb (83 kg)	4.59	Nov 7, 2008
Eugene Smith; QB	Recruit ratings: Scout: Rivals: (81)					
Overall recruit ranking: Scout: 12 (QB) Rivals: 3 (Dual-threat QB) ESPN: 8 (QB)
Note: In many cases, Scout, Rivals, 247Sports, On3, and ESPN may conflict in their listings of height and weight.; In these cases, the average was taken. ESPN grades are on a 100-point scale.; Sources: "West Virginia Football Commitments". Rivals.; "2009 West Virginia Football Commits". Scout.; "ESPN". ESPN.; "Scout.com Team Recruiting Rankings". Scout.; "2009 Team Ranking". Rivals.com.

== College career ==
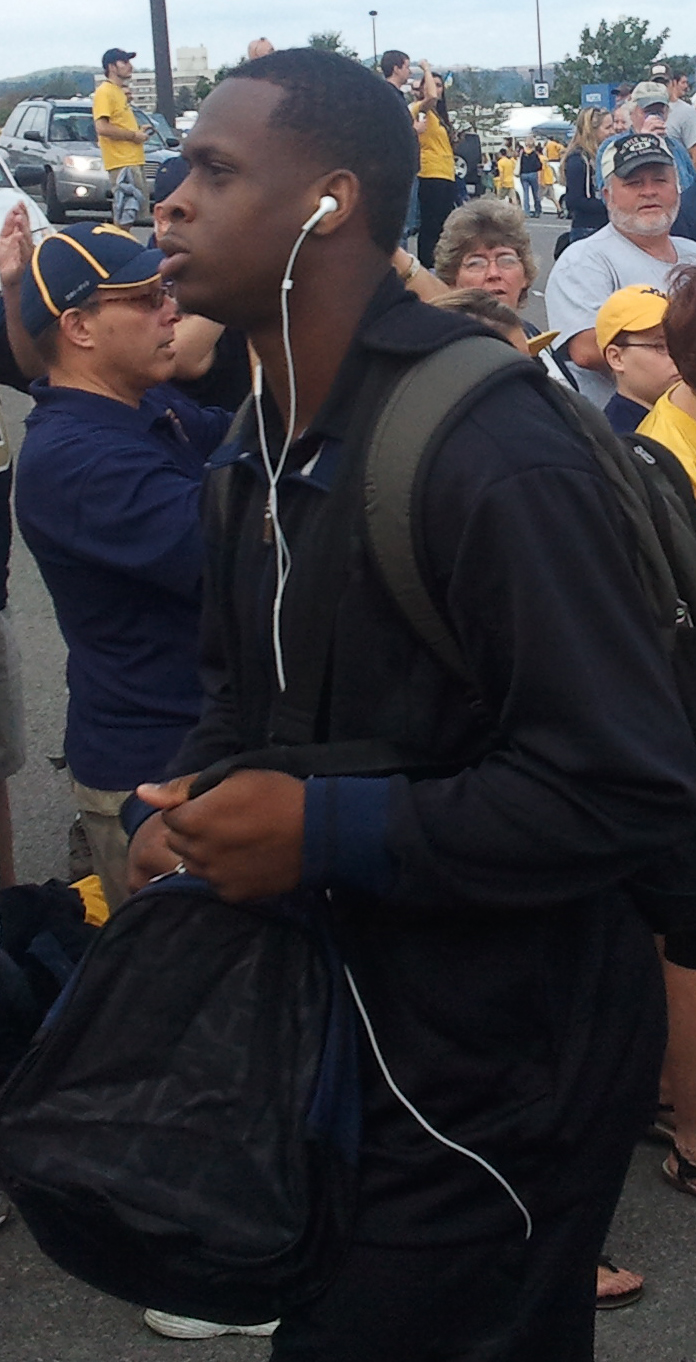
Geno Smith during his college career at West Virginia

Smith attended West Virginia University, where he played for the West Virginia Mountaineers football team from 2009 to 2012. Smith was an English major during his time at West Virginia.

=== Freshman year ===
Smith saw some action his freshman year as the backup behind senior Jarrett Brown. His first snap in a regular season game came against Auburn; Smith completed five of eight passes for 50 yards and an interception. He would see action again against Syracuse, Marshall, Louisville, and in the Gator Bowl against Florida State. In his freshman year at West Virginia University, Smith completed 32 of 49 passes for 309 yards, a touchdown, and an interception for an 81.1 quarterback rating to go along with 17 carries for seven yards as the backup to starting quarterback Brown.

=== Sophomore year ===
2010 was Smith's first year as the starting quarterback. Smith got his first start in the season opener against the Coastal Carolina Chanticleers, completing 20 of 27 passes for 216 yards, two touchdowns, and an interception in the 31–0 shutout victory.

With the Mountaineers down 21–6 against in-state rival, Marshall, Smith led his team to a fourth quarter comeback victory. He led the first drive from the Mountaineers' 4-yard line. With help from senior running back Noel Devine, the Mountaineers cut Marshall's lead to eight points. After the Mountaineers' defense stopped Marshall, a punt put the Mountaineers near their own end zone again, starting from the 2-yard line. After completing 9 of 13 passes and scrambling for 20 yards, Smith found tight end Will Johnson in the corner of the endzone for a touchdown. With Marshall still leading 21–19, head coach Bill Stewart elected to go for the two-point conversion. Smith completed a pass to wide receiver Jock Sanders in the back of the end zone for a two-point conversion. The Mountaineers went on to win the game in overtime by a score of 24–21. Smith finished the game completing 32 of 45 passes for 316 yards and a touchdown to go along with 14 carries for 13 yards. After two games, Smith led the Big East Conference in passing yards and passing efficiency.

In a 31–17 victory over Maryland, Smith completed 19 of 29 pass attempts for 268 yards and four touchdowns. Two of his touchdowns were to Tavon Austin, and the other two were to Stedman Bailey. Smith won his first Big East Offensive Player of the Week for this performance.

In West Virginia's first meeting ever with LSU, the Mountaineers lost at Tiger Stadium by a score of 20–14. Smith completed 14 of 29 pass attempts for 119 yards, two touchdowns, and an interception to go along with five carries for 10 yards.

Smith threw for 220 yards and ran for 19 yards in West Virginia's 49–10 win over UNLV. It was the most points WVU had scored since playing Connecticut in 2007.

During a 16–13 overtime loss to Connecticut, Smith completed 22 of 34 passes for 160 yards to go along with a season-high 64 rushing yards. This was the first game all season where Smith did not throw a touchdown pass. The loss was also the first time Connecticut had ever beaten West Virginia.

Smith tied his record for touchdowns in a game in a 37–10 win over Cincinnati, where he was 15 for 25, throwing for 174 yards, four touchdowns, and an interception. The win came after a two-game losing streak. It was the first time the Mountaineers beat Cincinnati since 2007. Smith won his second Big East Offensive Player of the Week for this performance.

On November 26 against Pittsburgh, Smith threw for 212 yards and three touchdowns in the 35–10 victory. In the next game against Rutgers, he had 352 passing yards and a touchdown in the 35–14 victory. Smith finished the 2010 season with 196 passing yards, a touchdown, and an interception in a 23–7 loss to North Carolina State in the Champs Sports Bowl.

Smith finished his sophomore season completing 241 of 372 passes for 2,763 yards, 24 touchdowns, and seven interceptions to go along with 106 carries for 217 yards.

=== Junior year ===
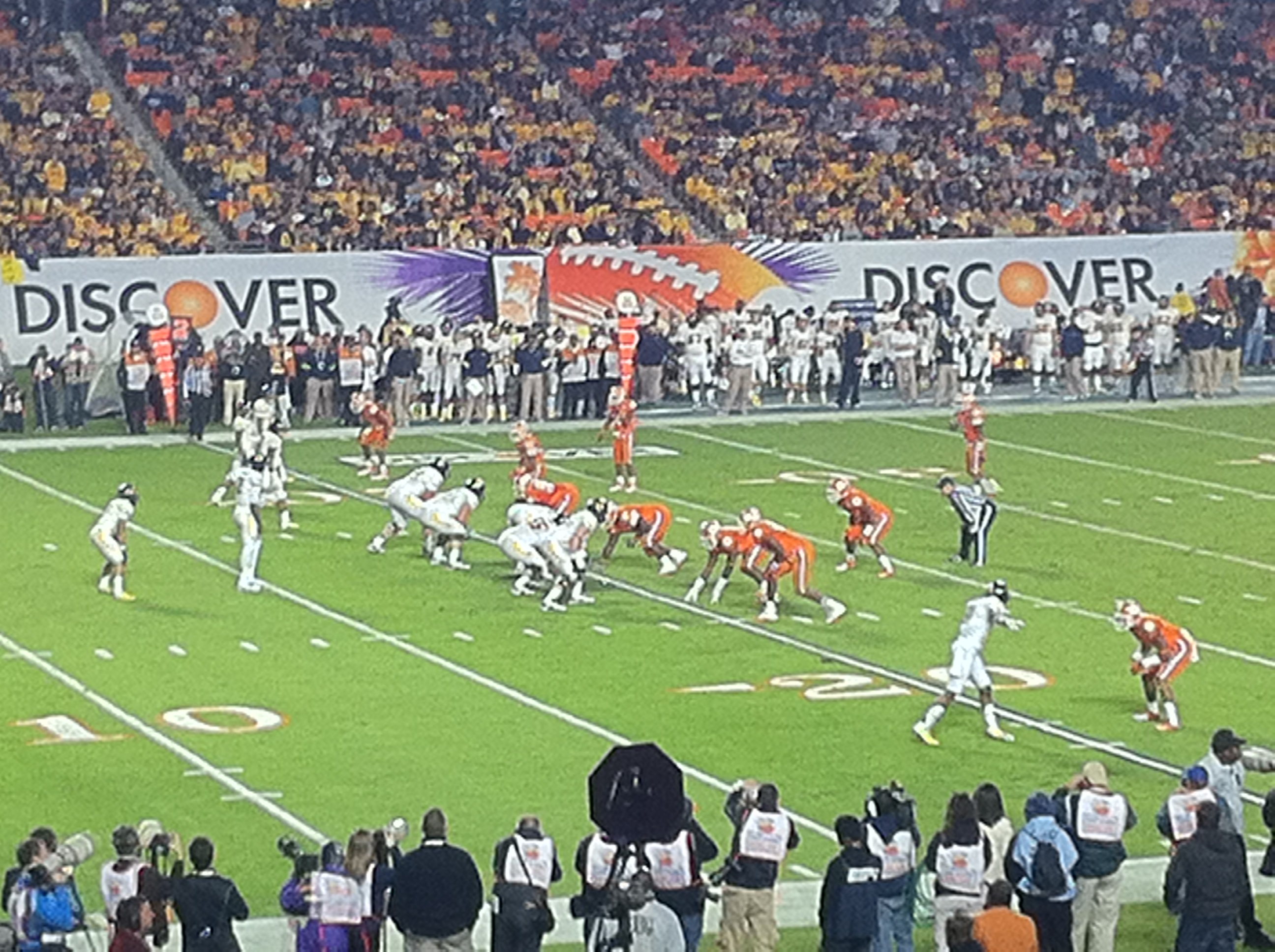
Smith and the West Virginia offense lined up against Clemson's defense in the 2012 Orange Bowl

With the arrival of new West Virginia football head coach Dana Holgorsen and a new passing-based offensive system, Smith saw his passing numbers improve drastically. In the fourth game of the season against the #2 LSU Tigers, Smith set school records for completions (38), attempts (65), and passing yards (463) in the 47–21 loss on September 24, 2011.

With 372 passing yards against the Cincinnati Bearcats on November 12, Smith tied a Big East record with his seventh 300-yard game of the season. He tied the record that was set in 2007 by Brian Brohm of the Louisville Cardinals.

Smith set single-season school records for pass completions (291), attempts (448), and yards (3,741) on November 25 in a win against the rival Pittsburgh Panthers. All three records were previously held by Marc Bulger.

In West Virginia's 70–33 rout of the Clemson Tigers in the 2012 Orange Bowl, Smith tied three individual bowl records: most touchdown passes (six), most touchdowns overall (seven) and total points (42). Smith's 401 passing yards broke Tom Brady's Orange Bowl record of 396 that he set in the 2000 Orange Bowl. Smith also became the Big East single-season passing leader with 4,379 yards, breaking Brian Brohm's mark that he set in 2007.

=== Senior year ===
As a senior, Smith put together multiple great statistical performances for the Mountaineers. In the season opening victory over Marshall, he finished 32-of-36 for 323 yards and four touchdowns. In the next game, a victory over James Madison, he finished 34-of-39 for 411 yards and five touchdowns. On September 29 against Baylor, Smith had a career-day, completing 45-of-51 passes for 656 yards and eight touchdowns in the 70–63 victory. In the next game, a victory over Texas, he finished with 268 passing yards and four touchdowns to help lead the Mountaineers to a 5–0 record. After the win over Texas, the season started to falter for the Mountaineers. Despite some solid individual results, Smith and the Mountaineers dropped the next five games. On November 23, Smith had 236 passing yards and two touchdowns in a victory over Iowa State to stop the losing streak. In the regular season finale against Kansas, he finished 23-of-24 for 407 yards, three touchdowns, and an interception in the 59–10 victory. In the Pinstripe Bowl against Syracuse, he finished with 201 passing yards and two touchdowns in the 38–14 loss.

Smith finished the season with 4,205 passing yards, an NCAA-leading 42 touchdowns, and six interceptions to go along with 66 carries for 151 yards and two touchdowns. After the season, he officially announced his decision to enter the 2013 NFL draft.

== Professional career ==
=== Pre-draft ===
Smith received an invitation to the NFL Scouting Combine where his performance was well received by scouts who highlighted his athleticism and strong arm but noted that his ball placement needed improvement. Smith was widely regarded as one of the top prospects alongside EJ Manuel of Florida State. In the days leading up to the draft, several NFL teams expressed interest in Smith including the Kansas City Chiefs (No. 1 selection), the Jacksonville Jaguars (No. 2 selection), the Oakland Raiders (No. 3 selection), the Philadelphia Eagles (No. 4 selection), the Buffalo Bills (No. 8 selection), and the New York Jets (No. 9 and No. 13 selections).

Pre-draft measurables
Height	Weight	Arm length	Hand span	Wingspan	40-yard dash	10-yard split	20-yard split	Vertical jump	Broad jump	Wonderlic
6 ft 2 3/8 in (1.89 m)	218 lb (99 kg)	32 1/2 in (0.83 m)	9 1/4 in (0.23 m)	6 ft 4 3/8 in (1.94 m)	4.59 s	1.62 s	2.69 s	33.5 in (0.85 m)	10 ft 4 in (3.15 m)	24
All values from NFL Combine

=== New York Jets (first stint) ===
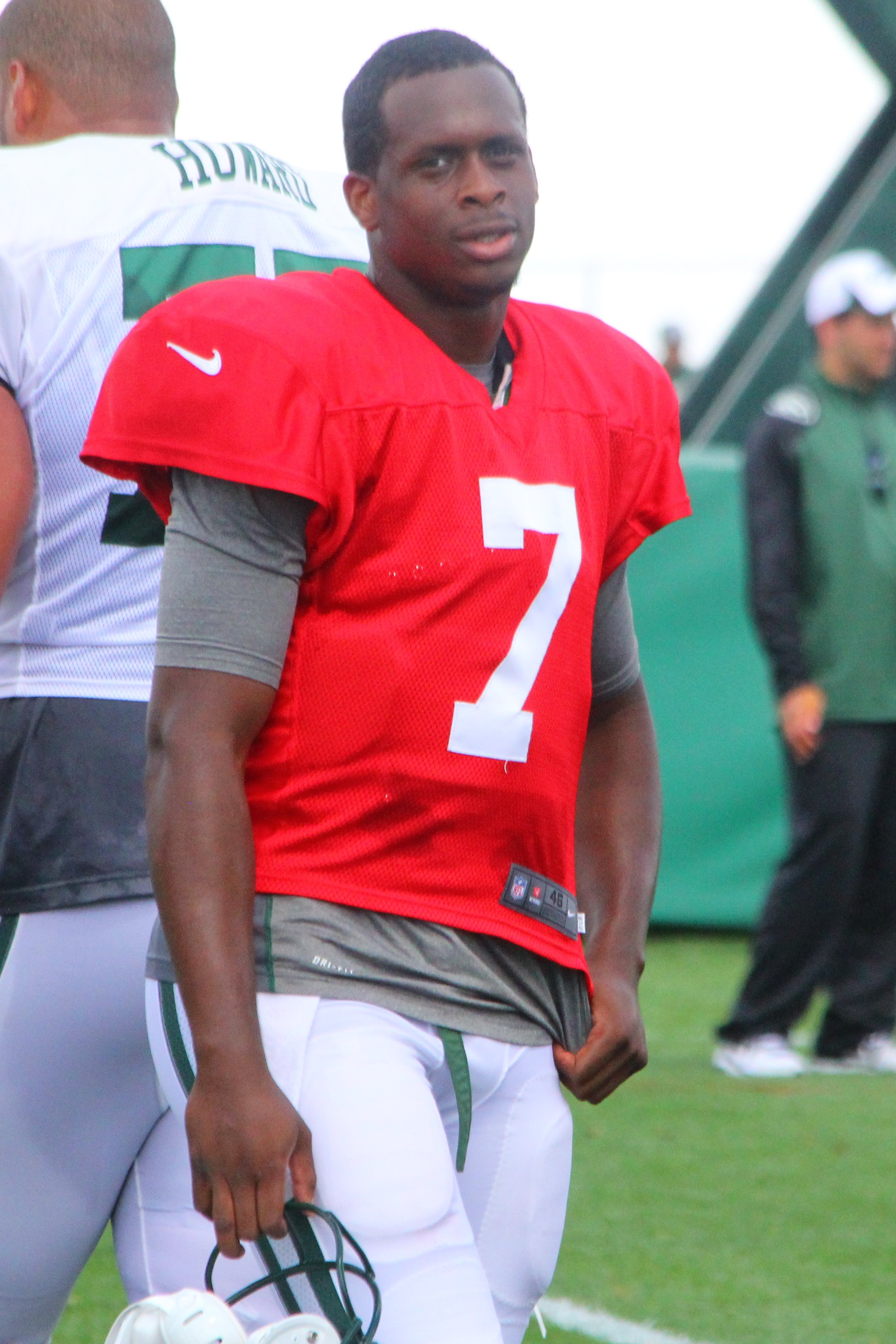
Smith during training camp in 2013

==== 2013 season ====
Smith was in attendance for the first round of the draft as many analysts and scouts expected him to be taken that night. However, Smith was not selected, and EJ Manuel was the lone quarterback taken in the first round. Smith declined to be interviewed by ESPN afterwards and originally planned to return home but later decided to attend the second day of the draft. Several league executives alleged Smith did not handle the draft process in a professional manner, which caused him to fall out of the first round, while analysts pointed to his late-season decline as a senior at West Virginia, which exposed his flaws, as the primary reason. The following day, the Jets expressed interest in trading up in the second round to select Smith but could not consummate a trade. Despite this, Smith remained available and the Jets selected him with the 39th overall pick. Following the selection, General manager John Idzik stated that Smith would compete with incumbent Mark Sanchez in training camp to determine the starting quarterback.

Smith fired his agency, Select Sports Group, upon the completion of the draft and sought new representation. He signed with Roc Nation Sports on May 22, 2013, with Kimberley Miale serving as his representative. Smith worked out in his home state of Florida during the offseason, prompting questions as to whether or not he had spurned Sanchez by not attending Sanchez's Jets West summer camp in California. Smith and Sanchez dismissed this notion with Sanchez saying that it was "no big deal."

On July 22, 2013, Smith signed a four-year, $5 million contract with approximately $690,000 in workout bonuses.

Smith made his professional debut on August 9, 2013, in the first preseason game against the Detroit Lions. He completed 6-of-7 passes for 47 yards but left the game due to an ankle injury in the second quarter. X-rays showed no structural damage and Smith returned to practice on August 11. Smith started the Jets' third preseason game against the New York Giants completing 16 of 30 passes for 199 yards, a touchdown, and three interceptions. Smith was named the team's starting quarterback after Sanchez suffered a shoulder injury against the Giants.

During the season-opening 18–17 victory over the Tampa Bay Buccaneers, Smith completed 24-of-38 passes for 256 yards, a touchdown, and an interception. With only a few seconds left in the fourth quarter, he was hit out of bounds by Lavonte David, which drew a late hit penalty and the Jets went on to score the game-winning field goal. In the next game against the New England Patriots, Smith struggled as he completed 15 of his 35 passes for 214 yards, a touchdown, and three interceptions as the Jets lost on the road by a score of 13–10. The following week against the Bills, Smith completed 16 of 29 passes for 331 yards, rushing for a touchdown and passing for two touchdowns and two interceptions. Despite 20 penalties, the Jets powered through and won 27–20. Smith became the first rookie quarterback in franchise history to throw for 300 or more yards in a game.

Smith struggled in the Week 4 38–13 road loss to the Tennessee Titans. He completed 23 of his 34 passes for 289 yards and a touchdown while committing four turnovers—two led to Titans touchdowns as the Jets lost 13–38. During a narrow Week 5 30–28 road victory over the Atlanta Falcons, Smith completed 16 of 20 passes for 199 yards and three touchdowns. He completed all four of his passes on the Jets' final drive, allowing Nick Folk to kick the game-winning 43-yard field goal. Smith was named American Football Conference Offensive Player of the Week and Pepsi NFL Rookie of the Week for his performance. In the next game against the Pittsburgh Steelers, Smith threw for 201 yards and two interceptions as the Jets lost by a score of 19–6. The following week against the Patriots, he completed 17 of 33 passes for 233 yards and scored two touchdowns as the Jets won by a score of 30–27 in overtime.

Smith struggled during the Week 8 9–49 road loss to the Cincinnati Bengals as he completed 20-of-30 passes for 159 yards and two interceptions that were returned for touchdowns before being relieved of duties by Matt Simms in the fourth quarter. Smith started in the next game against the New Orleans Saints and completed eight of 19 passes for 115 yards to go along with six carries for 18 yards and a touchdown in a 26–20 upset victory. The Jets returned from their bye week to lose three straight contests to the Bills, Baltimore Ravens and Miami Dolphins. Smith struggled during this stretch as he failed to score any points and committed eight turnovers; he was benched in favor of Simms against Buffalo and Miami leading coach Rex Ryan to be noncommittal in starting Smith the rest of the year.

Smith showed gradual improvement as the Jets won three of their final four games. During a Week 14 37–27 victory over the Raiders, Smith completed 16 of his 25 passes for 219 yards, a touchdown, and an interception to go along with five carries for 50 yards, keeping the team in playoff contention. In the next game against the Carolina Panthers, Smith performed well until throwing a costly pick six in the fourth quarter. The Jets lost on the road by a score of 30–20 and were eliminated from playoff contention. Smith finished the game completing 15 of 28 passes for 167 yards, a touchdown, and interception. The following week against the Browns, Smith completing 20-of-36 passes for 214 yards and two touchdowns to go along with 10 carries for 48 yards and a touchdown as the Jets won by a score of 24–13. In the regular-season finale against the Dolphins, Smith completed 17-of-27 passes for 190 yards and a touchdown to go along with 10 carries for 44 yards and a touchdown as the Jets won on the road by a score of 20–7, eliminating Miami from playoff contention.

Smith finished his rookie year with 3,046 yards, 12 touchdowns, and 21 interceptions to go along with 72 carries for 366 yards and six touchdowns in 16 games and starts.

==== 2014 season: Struggles and eventual benching ====
Smith was named the starter to begin the 2014 season. He began the season passing for 221 yards, a touchdown, and an interception in the 19–14 season-opening victory over the Raiders. In the next game against the Green Bay Packers, he passed for 176 yards, a touchdown, and an interception to go along with seven carries for 26 yards and a touchdown in the 31–24 road loss. The following week against the Chicago Bears, Smith's very first play resulted in an interception returned for a touchdown by Ryan Mundy. Smith finished the game with 316 passing yards, a touchdown, and two interceptions as the Jets lost to the Bears by a score of 27–19.

During a Week 4 24–17 loss to the Lions, Smith threw for 209 yards with an interception and lost fumble. On October 3, 2014, he was fined $12,000 for yelling profanity at fans while walking to the locker room during halftime in Week 4. Despite this incident, Smith was allowed to start in the next game against the San Diego Chargers, in which he threw for only 27 yards with an interception and was benched for the second half in favor of Michael Vick as the Jets were shut out on the road 31–0. Prior to the Week 5 game, Smith and a few of his teammates missed a team meeting, having gone to a movie theater in San Diego, unaware of the three-hour time difference between the Eastern and Pacific Time Zones. Smith started in the Week 6 31–17 loss to the Denver Broncos, throwing for 190 yards, two touchdowns, and an interception.

During a 27–25 road loss to the Patriots in Week 7, Smith threw for 226 yards and the Jets combined for 218 rushing yards, but the potential game-winning drive fell short due to a blocked field goal. In the next game, Smith lasted only ten minutes to begin regulation as he completed 2-of-8 passes for five yards and three interceptions against the Bills, and was subsequently benched in favor of Michael Vick. His passer rating for that game was 0.04.

In the regular-season finale against the Dolphins, Smith led the Jets to a 37–24 road victory, completing 20 of 25 passes for a career-high 358 yards, three touchdowns, no interceptions, and a perfect passer rating. This was his first perfect game, the sixth in Jets history, and the only one of the 2014 season.

Smith finished his second professional season with 2,525 passing yards, 13 touchdowns, and 13 interceptions to go along with 59 carries for 238 yards and a touchdown in 14 games and 13 starts.

==== 2015 season: Preseason injuries ====
On August 11, 2015, Smith was involved in an altercation with defensive end IK Enemkpali in the locker room over an alleged $600 unpaid debt. Smith suffered a fractured jaw after Enemkpali punched him in the face. Smith was ruled out for 6–10 weeks, and Enemkpali was released by the Jets shortly thereafter. Two days later, Smith underwent surgery on his fractured jaw. Ryan Fitzpatrick led the team to a 2–0 record while Smith was injured, so new head coach Todd Bowles decided to continue starting Fitzpatrick, even with Smith being healthy.

During a Week 8 34–20 road loss to the Raiders, Smith entered the game in relief of Fitzpatrick, who left the game with an injured thumb. Smith completed 27 of 42 passes for 265 yards, two touchdowns, and an interception to go along with two carries for 34 yards. This was his only appearance in 2015.

==== 2016 season: Torn ACL ====
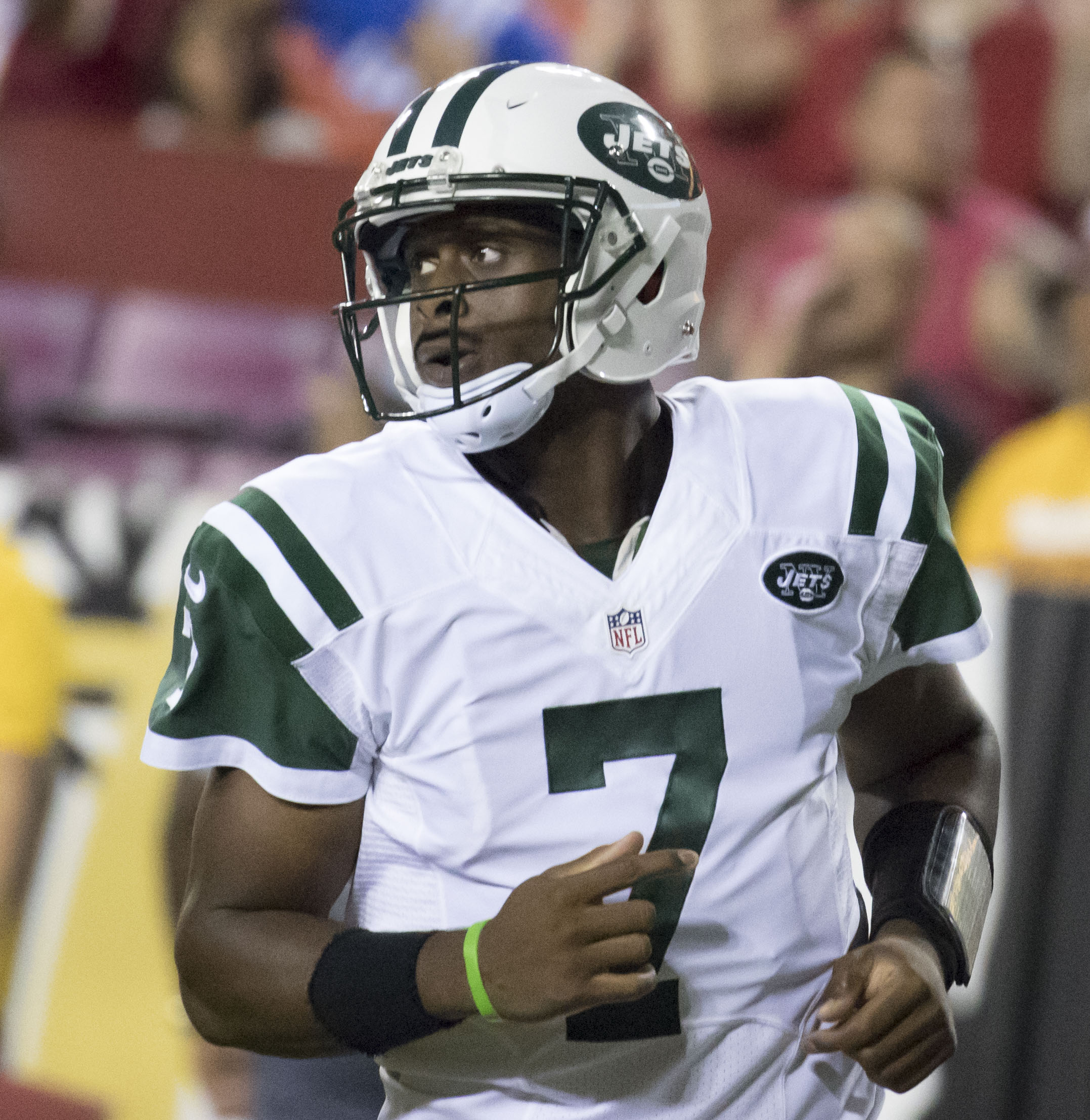
Smith in 2016

With Ryan Fitzpatrick re-signing with the Jets, Smith continued to remain in the backup role.

During a Week 6 28–3 road loss to the Arizona Cardinals, Smith came in after Fitzpatrick was benched for poor performance. Smith finished the game completing four of six passes for 31 yards and an interception. Two days later, he was named starter for the following game in place of Fitzpatrick.

Making the start in Week 7 against the Ravens, Smith threw for 95 yards and a touchdown until leaving the eventual 24–16 victory with an apparent knee injury. The next day, it was revealed that he tore his ACL, prematurely ending his 2016 season. Smith was placed on injured reserve on October 26, 2016.

=== New York Giants ===
On March 28, 2017, Smith signed with the New York Giants. During a Week 9 51–17 loss to the Los Angeles Rams, Smith came in the game in relief of Eli Manning late in the fourth quarter and finished with only two incomplete passes.

On November 28, the Giants named Smith the starter for the upcoming game against the Oakland Raiders, which ended Manning's 210-game starting streak with the Giants. The start made Smith the first African-American quarterback to start for the Giants and the first quarterback to start for both the Giants and the Jets; it also meant every NFL team had started a black player at quarterback, with the Giants being the last team to do so. Making his first start with the Giants, Smith threw for 212 yards and a touchdown but had two first-half fumbles within the Raiders' 30-yard line and the Giants lost by a score of 17–24. On December 5, Manning was renamed the starter.

=== Los Angeles Chargers ===
On April 1, 2018, Smith signed a one-year contract with the Los Angeles Chargers.

During a Week 6 38–14 road victory over the Cleveland Browns, Smith made his Chargers debut, completing one pass for eight yards. Overall, Smith appeared in five games during the 2018 season in relief roles.

=== Seattle Seahawks ===
Smith signed with the Seattle Seahawks on May 15, 2019.

==== 2019 season ====
Smith competed with Paxton Lynch for the backup job behind Russell Wilson. He was released on August 31, 2019, along with Lynch, but was re-signed the next day, earning the backup job. Smith saw no action during his first season with the team.

==== 2020 season ====
Smith re-signed with the Seahawks on May 20, 2020. His only appearance came during a Week 14 40–3 victory over his former team, the Jets, as he played out the final 16:26 of the game. Smith completed four of five passes for 33 yards, leading the Seahawks to a field goal on the second of his two drives.

==== 2021 season ====
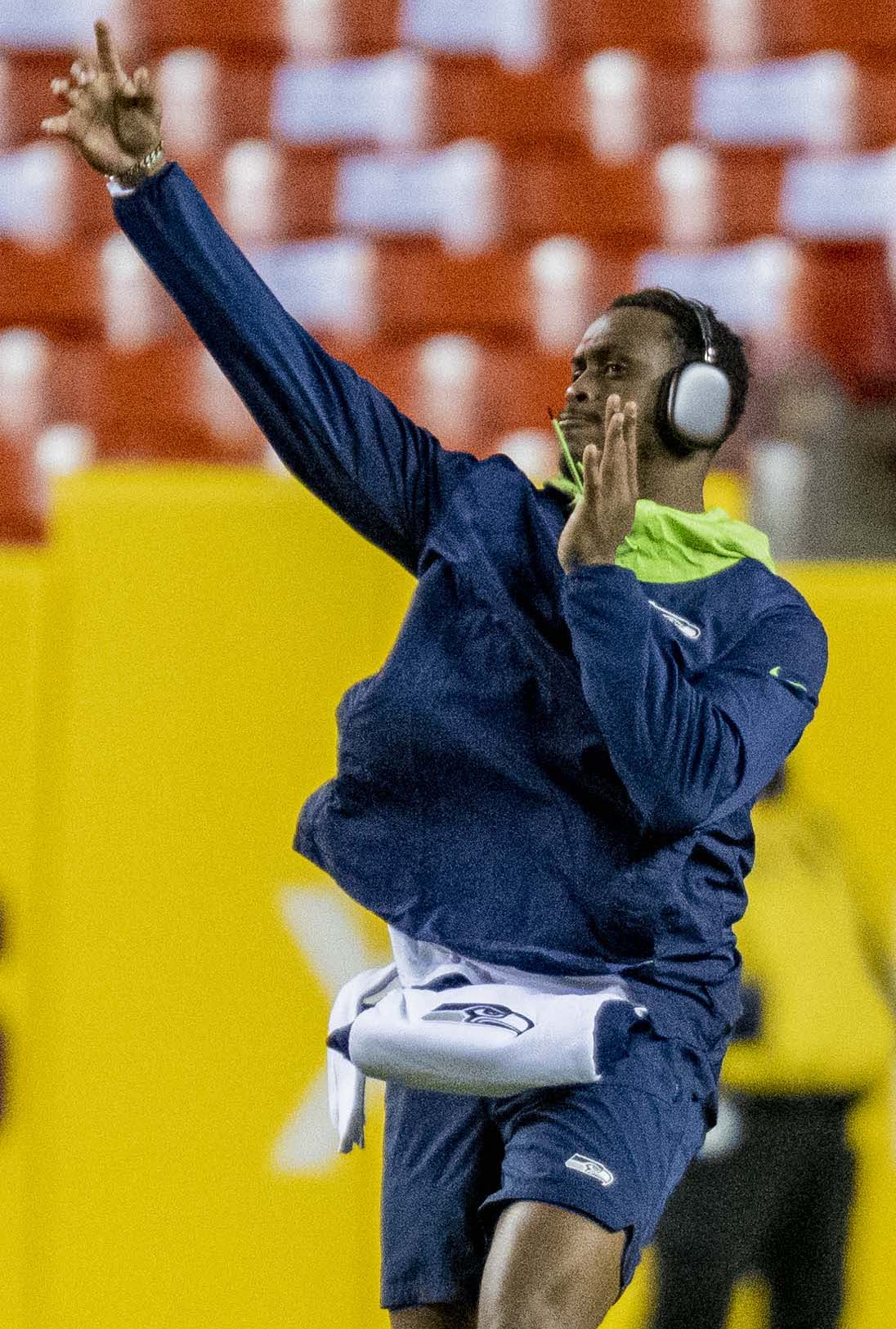
Smith in 2021

Smith re-signed with the Seahawks for a third season on April 22, 2021. He made his first appearance of the 2021 season in Week 5 against the Rams after Russell Wilson left the game with a finger injury. Smith finished the 26–17 home loss with 131 passing yards, a touchdown (which was his first since 2017), and an interception. Smith was announced the starter after Wilson was placed on injured reserve. In the next game against the Steelers, Smith threw for 209 yards and a touchdown, but lost a fumble in overtime during the 23–20 overtime road loss. Two weeks later against the Jaguars, Smith had 195 passing yards and two touchdowns to go along with two carries for eight yards and a touchdown in the 31–7 victory.

Smith finished the 2021 season with 702 passing yards, five touchdowns, and an interception to go along with nine carries for 42 yards and a touchdown in four games and three starts.

==== 2022 season: Comeback Player of the Year ====
The Seahawks re-signed Smith on April 19, 2022, but the NFL disapproved his new contract that same day after conducting the league's mandatory review; the issue was eventually resolved.

Smith competed against Drew Lock for the starting quarterback spot after the Seahawks traded Russell Wilson to the Broncos in the offseason. On August 26, Smith was announced as the starting quarterback for the season opener against the Broncos. Smith completed 23-of-28 passes for 195 yards and two touchdowns in the narrow 17–16 victory. Three weeks later against the Lions, he threw for 320 yards and two touchdowns while also rushing for 49 yards and a touchdown in the 48–45 road victory. Smith was named NFC Offensive Player of the Week for his performance. During a Week 8 27–13 victory over his former team, the Giants, Smith threw for 212 yards and two touchdowns.

On December 21, 2022, Smith was selected to his first Pro Bowl. During a Week 17 23–6 victory over his former team, the Jets, Smith completed 18-of-29 passes for 183 yards and two touchdowns, keeping the Seahawks alive in the playoff hunt and eliminating the team that drafted him in the process. In a must-win game during the regular-season finale against the Rams, Smith completed 19-of-31 passes for 213 yards, a touchdown, and two interceptions in the 19–16 overtime victory. During the game, he became the Seahawks’ single-season passing leader, surpassing Russell Wilson's mark of 4,219 yards set back in 2016. With the victory and the Packers' loss to the Lions later that night, the Seahawks clinched a playoff berth as the seventh seed, marking Smith's first playoff appearance.

Smith finished the regular season with numerous career highs, completing 399 of 572 passes, with a league-leading 69.8% completion percentage, for 4,282 yards, 30 touchdowns, and 11 interceptions for a 100.9 passer rating to go along with 68 carries for 366 yards and a touchdown in 17 games and starts. He was also the only quarterback to take every offensive snap for his team that season. Smith was named Comeback Player of the Year by the Associated Press and the Pro Football Writers of America (PFWA). The PFWA also named him as their Most Improved Player.

The Seahawks went on the road to face the San Francisco 49ers in the Wild Card Round, Smith's first career postseason start. He completed 25-of-35 passes for 253 yards, two touchdowns, and an interception, while also losing a fumble during the 41–23 loss. Smith was ranked 77th by his fellow players on the NFL Top 100 Players of 2023.

==== 2023 season ====
On March 14, 2023, Smith re-signed with the Seahawks on a three-year, $75 million deal.

During a Week 2 37–31 shootout overtime victory over the Detroit Lions, Smith threw for 328 yards and two touchdowns, while also rushing for 20 yards. He was briefly knocked out by a knee injury two weeks later against the New York Giants, but returned to finish the 24–3 road victory with 110 passing yards and a touchdown to go along with a reception that went for −2 yards. During Week 10 against the Washington Commanders, Smith threw for a career-high 369 yards and two touchdowns and had a 13-yard rush. The Seahawks won 29–26 after Smith led a game-winning drive that ended with a field goal as time expired.

Smith was forced out of the following week's game against the Los Angeles Rams after suffering an injury to his throwing elbow in the third quarter. He returned with less than two minutes left in the fourth quarter with his team down 17–16, and led a drive into field goal range, but Jason Myers missed a 55-yard potential game-winning field goal with two seconds left, and the Seahawks lost. Smith finished the game with 233 passing yards and a touchdown to go along with −1 rushing yards from a kneel down at the end of the first half. During Week 13 against the Dallas Cowboys, Smith had a career-high four total touchdowns (three passing and one rushing), 334 passing yards, an interception, and six rushing yards in the 41–35 road loss. He missed the next two games after suffering a groin injury in practice with Drew Lock starting in his place. Smith returned in Week 16 against the Tennessee Titans and led two long touchdown drives in the second half, the second of which occurred in the final minutes of the game, that propelled the Seahawks to a 20–17 road victory. Smith finished the game with 227 passing yards and the two aforementioned touchdowns to go along with two rushing yards. The last-minute touchdown drive came just one week after Lock led one of his own against the Philadelphia Eagles in an identical 20–17 outcome. During the regular season finale against the Arizona Cardinals, Smith threw a touchdown and a go-ahead two-point conversion (both to Tyler Lockett) in the fourth quarter of the narrow 21–20 victory. He finished the game with 189 passing yards and two touchdowns to go along with 28 rushing yards.

Smith finished the 2023 season with 3,624 passing yards, 20 touchdowns, and nine interceptions to go along with 155 rushing yards and a touchdown. He also threw an NFL record seven go-ahead touchdown passes in the fourth quarter and overtime during the season and posted the league's best Total QBR over the final six weeks. Smith was named to the Pro Bowl for the second consecutive season.

==== 2024 season ====
During Week 4, Smith passed for 395 yards, a touchdown, and an interception in the 42–29 loss to the Lions. On the road against the 49ers in Week 11, Smith led the Seahawks on an 11-play, 80-yard drive, capped off with a 13-yard touchdown run to put Seattle ahead with 12 seconds left as they won 20–17.

Smith finished the 2024 season with 4,283 passing yards, breaking his own Seahawks single-season record from 2022. Smith also broke franchise records for single-season passing attempts and completions, with 573 and 400, respectively. In winning 10 games, posting a season-long completion percentage of over 70%, and setting a new personal best for yards thrown in the season, Smith earned $6 million worth of incentives.

=== Las Vegas Raiders ===
On March 13, 2025, Smith was traded to the Las Vegas Raiders in exchange for the 92nd overall pick (Jalen Milroe) in the 2025 NFL draft. The trade reunited Smith with former Seahawks head coach Pete Carroll. Smith, who had one year remaining on the contract he signed with the Seahawks, did not sign a contract extension with the Raiders upon the deal's initial completion. On April 3, Smith and the Raiders agreed to terms on a two-year, $75 million contract extension.

Smith made his Raiders debut in the season-opening 20–13 victory over the Patriots, putting up 362 passing yards, a touchdown, and an interception. Smith also set a Raiders franchise record for most passing yards in a debut, surpassing the previous record of 317 yards set by Dan Pastorini. Smith led the Raiders to only two wins as the starter, throwing for 3,025 yards, 19 touchdowns, and a league-high 17 interceptions.

=== New York Jets (second stint) ===
On March 11, 2026, Smith and a seventh-round pick in the 2026 NFL draft were traded to the New York Jets in exchange for a sixth-round pick in the 2026 draft.

During the season opener against the Tennessee Titans in Week 1, Smith completed 19 out of 24 passes for 215 yards as the Jets won 23–10. During the Jets' home opener against the Green Bay Packers in Week 2, Smith completed 27 out of 41 passes for 247 yards and two touchdowns as the Jets lost 20–17 in overtime. During Week 3 against the Detroit Lions, Smith completed 31 out of 37 passes for 321 yards and three touchdowns. However, Smith fumbled with 45 seconds left in the fourth quarter, which the Lions recovered, and the Jets lost 24–31. On the same day his Week 3 match premiered, Smith was fined $11,491 by the NFL for taunting during the previous week against the Packers. During Week 4 against the Chicago Bears, the Jets only had 157 total yards of offense, as opposed to the Bears having 492. Smith completed 8 out of 15 passes for 119 yards, with one big play being a 58-yard touchdown pass to Isaiah Williams. The Jets lost 12–23, having just ran a franchise-low 32 plays that game.

After not throwing a single interception in the first five games of the season, Smith first interception of the year came in Week 6 against the New England Patriots. He completed 20 out of 30 passes for 252 yards and a touchdown as the Jets lost 19–26.

During Week 10 against the Buffalo Bills, Smith departed due to an ankle injury in the third quarter and was replaced by rookie Cade Klubnik. The Jets later lost 12–31.

== Career statistics ==
Legend
	Led the league
**Bold**	Career high

=== NFL ===
==== Regular season ====
Year	Team	Games			Passing									Rushing					Sacks		Fumbles	
Year	Team	GP	GS	Record	Cmp	Att	Pct	Yds	Y/A	Lng	TD	Int	Rtg	Att	Yds	Avg	Lng	TD	Sck	SckY	Fum	Lost
2013	NYJ	16	16	8–8	247	443	55.8	3,046	6.9	69	12	**21**	66.5	**72**	**366**	5.1	32	**6**	43	315	8	**4**
2014	NYJ	14	13	3–10	219	367	59.7	2,525	6.9	74	13	13	77.5	59	238	4.0	18	1	28	175	8	3
2015	NYJ	1	0	—	27	42	64.3	265	6.3	28	2	1	87.9	2	34	**17.0**	29	0	3	19	0	0
2016	NYJ	2	1	**1–0**	8	14	57.1	126	**9.0**	69	1	1	81.2	2	9	4.5	7	0	3	19	1	0
2017	NYG	2	1	0–1	21	36	58.3	212	5.9	47	1	0	84.5	4	12	3.0	10	0	3	12	2	2
2018	LAC	5	0	—	1	4	25.0	8	2.0	8	0	0	39.6	8	2	0.3	9	0	1	16	1	1
2019	SEA	0	0	—	DNP																	
2020	SEA	1	0	—	4	5	**80.0**	33	6.6	14	0	0	94.2	2	−2	−1.0	0	0	1	3	1	0
2021	SEA	4	3	1–2	65	95	68.4	702	7.4	**84**	5	1	**103.0**	9	42	4.7	12	1	13	117	1	1
2022	SEA	17	17	9–8	399	572	69.8	4,282	7.5	54	**30**	11	100.9	68	**366**	5.4	25	1	46	348	8	**4**
2023	SEA	15	15	8–7	323	499	64.7	3,624	7.3	73	20	9	92.1	37	155	4.2	25	1	31	231	5	3
2024	SEA	17	17	10–7	**407**	**578**	70.4	**4,320**	7.5	71	21	15	93.2	53	272	5.1	**34**	2	50	338	**9**	0
2025	LV	15	15	2–13	302	448	67.4	3,025	6.8	61	19	17	84.7	41	109	2.7	20	0	**55**	**405**	4	0
2026	NYJ	10	10	2–8	196	292	67.1	2,226	7.6	60	12	3	99.2	24	54	2.3	11	0	29	242	4	0
Career		119	108	44–64	2,219	3,395	65.4	24,394	7.2	84	136	92	88.6	381	1,657	4.3	34	12	306	2,240	52	18

==== Postseason ====
Year	Team	Games			Passing									Rushing					Sacks		Fumbles	
Year	Team	GP	GS	Record	Cmp	Att	Pct	Yds	Avg	Lng	TD	Int	Rtg	Att	Yds	Avg	Lng	TD	Sck	SckY	Fum	Lost
2018	LAC	0	0	—	DNP																	
2019	SEA	0	0	—	DNP																	
2020	SEA	0	0	—	DNP																	
2022	SEA	1	1	0–1	25	35	71.4	253	7.2	50	2	1	98.9	4	28	7.0	11	0	3	25	1	1
Career		1	1	0–1	25	35	71.4	253	7.2	50	2	1	98.9	4	28	7.0	11	0	3	25	1	1

=== College ===
Legend
Led the NCAA

Season	Team	Games			Passing								Rushing			
Season	Team	GP	GS	Record	Cmp	Att	Pct	Yds	Avg	TD	Int	Rtg	Att	Yds	Avg	TD
2009	West Virginia	5	0	0–0	32	49	65.3	309	6.3	1	1	120.9	17	7	0.4	0
2010	West Virginia	13	13	9–4	241	372	64.8	2,763	7.4	24	**7**	144.7	**106**	**217**	2.0	0
2011	West Virginia	13	13	**10–3**	346	**526**	65.8	**4,385**	**8.3**	31	**7**	152.6	56	−33	−0.6	**2**
2012	West Virginia	13	13	7–6	**369**	518	**71.2**	4,205	8.1	**42**	6	**163.9**	66	151	**2.3**	**2**
Career		44	39	26–13	988	1,465	67.4	11,662	8.0	98	21	153.5	245	342	1.4	4

== Career highlights ==
=== Awards and honors ===
NFL

- NFL Comeback Player of the Year (2022)
- PFWA Most Improved Player (2022)
- 2× Pro Bowl (2022, 2023)
- NFL completion percentage leader (2022)
- Ranked No. 77 in the Top 100 Players of 2023
- NFC Offensive Player of the Month (October 2022)
- AFC Offensive Player of the Week (Week 5, 2013)
- NFC Offensive Player of the Week (Week 4, 2022)

College

- First-team All-Big East (2011)
- Second-team All-Big East (2010)
- Second-team All-Big 12 (2012)
- NCAA passing touchdowns leader (2012)
- Orange Bowl MVP (2012)
- 4× Big East Offensive Player of the Week
- 3× Big 12 Offensive Player of the Week
- 2× National Offensive Player of the Week (for week ending September 3, 2012; for week ending September 29, 2012)

=== Jets franchise records ===
- Most passing yards in a single season by a rookie: 3,046 (2013)

=== Seahawks franchise records ===
- Highest completion percentage in a single season: 70.4% (2024)
- Most passing yards in a season: 4,320 (2024)
- Most pass completions in a single season: 407 (2024)
- Most pass attempts in a single season: 578 (2024)

== Personal life ==
Smith married his college girlfriend, Hayley Eastham, in July 2015. They were in a long-term relationship before getting married in 2015. Smith and Eastham had a son, Seven Santana Smith (named after his jersey number), on July 17, 2019. Smith's cousin is Ohio State All-American wide receiver Jeremiah Smith.

Smith is a Christian, frequently posting about his faith on his Twitter account. Prior to the 2023 NFL season, Smith told Peter King that he had adopted a pescatarian diet, having abstained from eating chicken or beef for most of the year to date.

== See also ==
- List of NCAA major college football yearly passing leaders
