= Al-Quadin Muhammad =

American football player (born 1995)

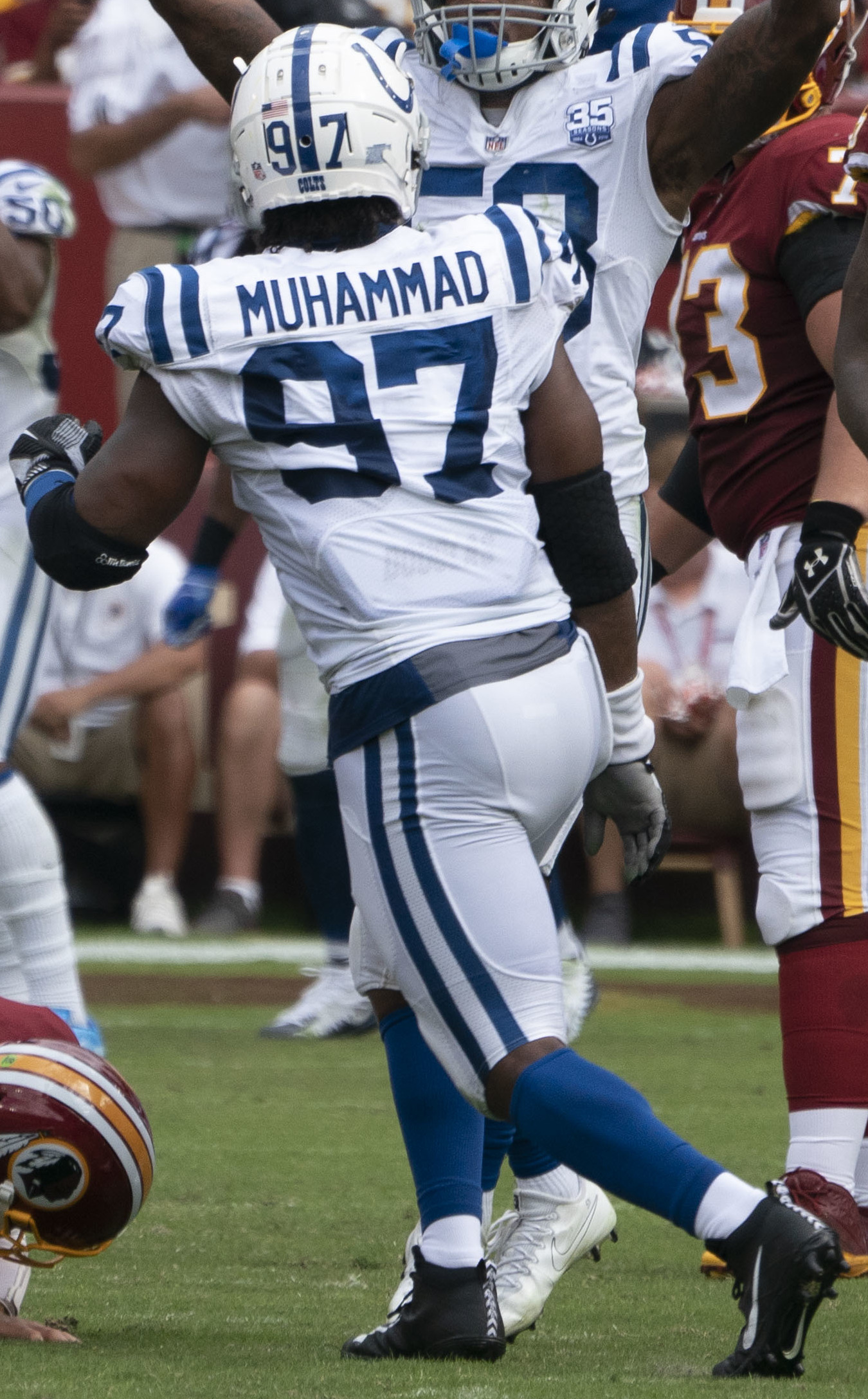
- Muhammad with the Indianapolis Colts in 2018

No. 97 – Tampa Bay Buccaneers
- Position: Outside linebacker
- Roster status: Active

Personal information
- Born: March 28, 1995 (age 31); Irvington, New Jersey, U.S.
- Listed height: 6 ft 3 in (1.91 m)
- Listed weight: 250 lb (113 kg)

Career information
- High school: Don Bosco Prep (Ramsey, New Jersey)
- College: Miami (FL) (2013–2016)
- NFL draft: 2017: 6th round, 196th overall pick

Career history
- New Orleans Saints (2017); Indianapolis Colts (2018–2021); Chicago Bears (2022); Indianapolis Colts (2023)*; Dallas Cowboys (2024)*; Detroit Lions (2024–2025); Tampa Bay Buccaneers (2026–present)
- * Offseason or practice squad member only

Career NFL statistics as of 2025
- Total Tackles: 193
- Sacks: 26.0
- Forced fumbles: 4
- Fumble recoveries: 1
- Pass deflections: 2
- Stats at Pro Football Reference

Al-Quadin Muhammad (born March 28, 1995) is an American professional football outside linebacker for the Tampa Bay Buccaneers of the National Football League (NFL). He played college football for the Miami Hurricanes. He was selected by the New Orleans Saints in the sixth round of the 2017 NFL draft.

== Early life ==
A native of Irvington, New Jersey, Muhammad attended Paterson Catholic High School in Paterson, New Jersey, but the school closed after his freshman year, and he then transferred to Don Bosco Preparatory High School in Ramsey, New Jersey, where he was a four-star defensive end, ranked as the No. 1 NFL prospect in New Jersey.

== College career ==
In 2013, Muhammad committed to the University of Miami. As a freshman he played in five games, making 6 tackles and 2.0 sacks. Muhammad was handed a season-long suspension for an altercation involving a former roommate after Miami's spring game; he missed the entire 2014 season. In 2015, he played in 12 games and finished the season with 54 tackles, 8.5 for loss and 5.0 sacks. But Muhammad missed the 2016 season after he was suspended and later dismissed from the football program along with teammate Jermaine Grace for his role in a luxury rental car scandal that violated NCAA rules.

== Professional career ==
Pre-draft measurables
Height	Weight	Arm length	Hand span	Wingspan	40-yard dash	10-yard split	20-yard split	20-yard shuttle	Three-cone drill	Vertical jump	Broad jump	Bench press
6 ft 3 1/2 in (1.92 m)	253 lb (115 kg)	33 1/4 in (0.84 m)	9 3/8 in (0.24 m)	6 ft 7 5/8 in (2.02 m)	4.75 s	1.65 s	2.71 s	4.38 s	7.25 s	30.5 in (0.77 m)	9 ft 9 in (2.97 m)	22 reps
All values from NFL Combine/Pro Day

=== New Orleans Saints ===
Muhammad was selected by the New Orleans Saints in the sixth round, 196th overall, in the 2017 NFL draft. He debuted for the Saints in Week 1 of the 2017 NFL season against the Minnesota Vikings. Muhammad made four appearances for New Orleans during his rookie campaign, recording one combined tackle.

On September 1, 2018, Muhammad was waived by the Saints as a part of final roster cuts.

=== Indianapolis Colts ===
On September 2, 2018, Muhammad was claimed off waivers by the Indianapolis Colts. He was waived by the Colts on October 4, and was subsequently re-signed to the team's practice squad. Muhammad was promoted to the active roster on October 13.

In Week 10 of the 2020 season against the Tennessee Titans on Thursday Night Football, Muhammad was ejected from the game after punching offensive tackle Ty Sambrailo.

Muhammad re-signed with the Colts on April 1, 2021.

=== Chicago Bears ===
On March 20, 2022, Muhammad signed a two-year contract with the Chicago Bears.

He was released on February 21, 2023.

=== Indianapolis Colts (second stint) ===
On July 25, 2023, Muhammad signed a one-year contract with the Colts. He was released on August 29, 2023, and re-signed to the practice squad. On December 6, 2023, Muhammad was suspended for six games without pay by the NFL for violating the NFL’s policy on Performance Enhancing Drugs. He was not signed to a reserve/future contract after the season and thus became a free agent upon the expiration of his contract.

=== Dallas Cowboys ===
On August 1, 2024, Muhammad signed with the Dallas Cowboys. He was released on August 28.

=== Detroit Lions ===
On October 7, 2024, Muhammad signed with the Detroit Lions practice squad. He was promoted to the active roster on November 9. In 9 appearances (2 starts) for Detroit, Muhammad logged 1 pass deflection, 3.0 sacks, and 11 combined tackles.

On March 19, 2025, Muhammad re-signed with the Lions. In Week 14, Muhammad recorded three sacks, three tackles, three tackles for loss, and four QB hits in a 44-30 win over the Dallas Cowboys, earning NFC Defensive Player of the Week.

=== Tampa Bay Buccaneers ===
On March 12, 2026, Muhammed signed with the Tampa Bay Buccaneers on a one-year contract worth up to $6 million.
