= Miramar, Florida =

City in Broward County, Florida

- City
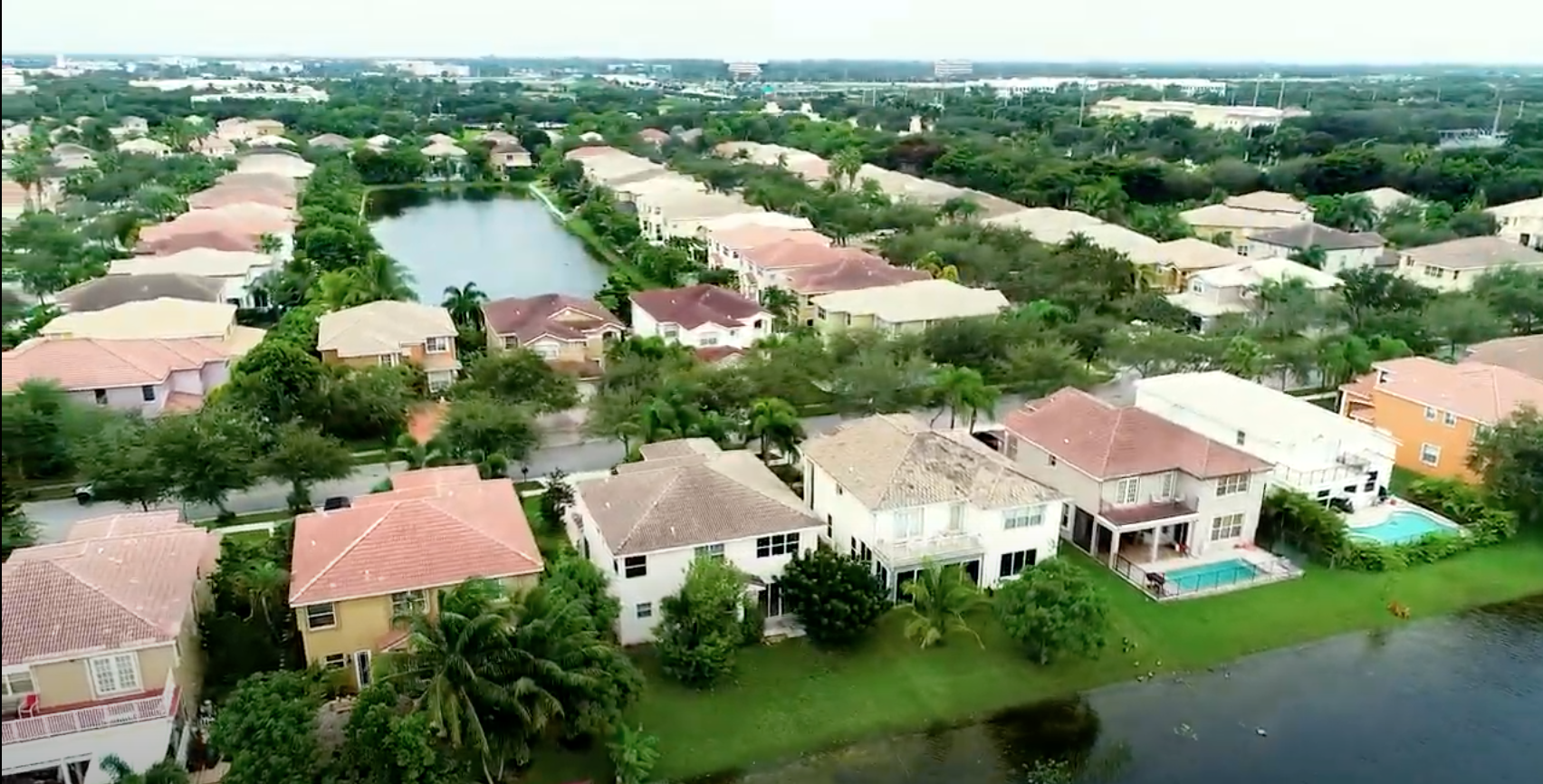

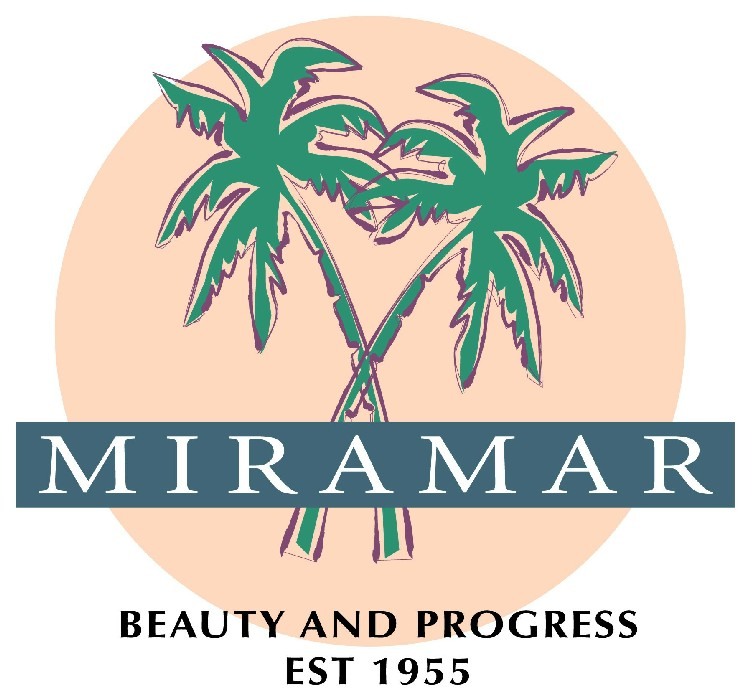
- Flag Seal
- Motto(s): Beauty and Progress
- Coordinates: 25°58′36″N 80°19′23″W
- Country: United States
- State: Florida
- County: Broward
- Incorporated: May 26, 1955

Government
  - Type: Commission-Manager
  - Mayor: Wayne M. Messam
  - Vice Mayor: Carson "Eddy" Edwards
  - Commissioner: Yvette Colbourne
  - Commissioner: Maxwell B. Chambers
  - Commissioner: Avril Cherasard

Area
  - Total: 31.08 sq mi (80.50 km^{2})
  - Land: 28.85 sq mi (74.73 km^{2})
  - Water: 2.23 sq mi (5.77 km^{2}) 5.66%
- Elevation: 7 ft (2.1 m)

Population (2020)
  - Total: 134,721
  - Estimate (2024): 143,242
  - Rank: 201st in the United States; 14th in Florida
  - Density: 4,669/sq mi (1,802.8/km^{2})
- Time zone: UTC−5 (EST)
  - Summer (DST): UTC−4 (EDT)
- ZIP codes: 33023, 33025, 33027, 33029
- Area codes: 754, 954
- FIPS code: 12-45975
- GNIS feature ID: 2404275
- Website: www.miramarfl.gov

Miramar (/ˈmɪ.rə.mɑːr/, MIH-rə-mar) is a city in southern Broward County, Florida, United States. It is a suburb of the Miami metropolitan area. As of the 2020 census, the population was 134,721, making it the fourth-largest city in Broward County, the sixth-largest city in the Miami metro area, and the 14th-largest city in Florida.

== History ==
The city was incorporated on May 26, 1955, and was named for the Miramar area of Havana, Cuba.

On June 20, 1955, the city's inaugural mayor and city council were all appointed by the governor of Florida. The city's first municipal elections were held in 1959.

Until March 13, 1991, the city operated under the "strong mayor" form of the mayor–city commission form of government." On March 14, 1990, Miramar voters approved a referendum to change to a commission–city manager government. Wayne Messam became mayor in 2015.

== Geography ==
According to the United States Census Bureau, the city has a total area of 31.3 square miles (81.0 km^{2}), of which 29.5 square miles (76.5 km^{2}) is land and 1.8 square miles (4.6 km^{2}) (5.66%) is water.

== Demographics ==
Historical population
Census	Pop.	Note	%±
1960	5,485		—
1970	23,997		337.5%
1980	32,813		36.7%
1990	40,663		23.9%
2000	72,739		78.9%
2010	122,041		67.8%
2020	134,721		10.4%
2025 (est.)	142,570	▲	5.8%
U.S. Decennial Census; 1960–1970 1980 1990; 2000 2010 2020 2024

Historical racial composition	2020	2010	2000	1990	1980
White (non-Hispanic)	8.0%	11.6%	21.6%	65.6%	90.6%
Hispanic or Latino	41.1%	36.9%	29.4%	17.3%	7.8%
Black or African American (non-Hispanic)	41.1%	43.5%	42.0%	14.5%	0.8%
Asian and Pacific Islander (non-Hispanic)	5.7%	5.2%	3.1%	2.2%	0.8%
Native American (non-Hispanic)	0.1%	0.1%	0.1%	0.2%	0.8%
Some other race (non-Hispanic)	1.0%	0.6%	0.6%	0.2%	0.8%
Two or more races (non-Hispanic)	2.9%	2.1%	3.2%	N/A	N/A
Population	134,721	122,041	72,739	40,663	32,813

Demographic characteristics	2020	2010	2000	1990	1980
Households	43,826	40,294	25,905	14,395	11,647
Persons per household	3.07	3.03	2.81	2.82	2.82
Sex ratio	88.5	89.3	90.8	93.1	94.0
Ages 0–17	23.6%	29.1%	31.0%	26.7%	25.9%
Ages 18–64	65.3%	64.0%	62.6%	63.6%	62.7%
Ages 65 +	11.1%	6.9%	6.3%	9.7%	11.4%
Median age	37.3	33.6	31.8	32.3	32.9
Population	134,721	122,041	72,739	40,663	32,813

Economic indicators
2018–22 American Community Survey	Miramar	Broward County	Florida
Median income	$44,901	$39,690	$37,826
Median household income	$81,812	$70,331	$67,917
Poverty rate	8.2%	12.4%	12.9%
High school diploma	91.2%	90.0%	89.3%
Bachelor's degree	30.8%	34.9%	32.3%
Advanced degree	11.4%	13.3%	12.1%

Language spoken at home (Note: Language spoken at home among residents at least five years old; only languages (or language groups) which at least 2% of residents have spoken at any time since 1980 are mentioned)	2020 (Note: Refers to 2018–2022 American Community Survey data; the last Decennial Census where language data was collected was in the 2000 census)	2010 (Note: Refers to 2008–2012 American Community Survey data; the last Decennial Census where language data was collected was in the 2000 census)	2000	1990	1980
English	53.0%	48.8%	59.4%	77.6%	85.0%
Spanish or Spanish Creole	31.7%	35.8%	29.6%	15.9%	7.3%
French or Haitian Creole	9.2%	9.6%	6.8%	2.6%	1.4%
Italian	N/A (Note: Not counted separately; aggregated into "Other" category)	0.2%	0.2%	1.1%	2.9%
Other languages	6.1%	5.6%	4.0%	2.8%	3.4%

Nativity	2020 (Note: Refers to 2018–2022 American Community Survey data; the last Decennial Census where foreign-born population data was collected was in the 2000 census)	2010 (Note: Refers to 2008–2012 American Community Survey data; the last Decennial Census where foreign-born population data was collected was in the 2000 census)	2000	1990	1980
% population native-born	61.3%	57.1%	59.3%	79.9%	89.9%
... born in the United States	58.1%	53.1%	55.6%	76.3%	87.8%
... born in Puerto Rico or Island Areas	2.0%	2.9%	2.9%	2.7%	2.1%
... born to American parents abroad	1.3%	1.1%	0.8%	1.0%	2.1%
% population foreign-born (Note: Only countries of birth which at least 2% of residents were born in at any time since 1980 are mentioned)	38.7%	42.9%	40.7%	20.1%	10.1%
... born in Jamaica	7.9%	10.1%	12.5%	5.2%	N/A
... born in Haiti	6.5%	5.7%	3.9%	1.4%	N/A
... born in Cuba	5.8%	4.8%	5.7%	2.5%	1.7%
... born in Colombia	2.9%	3.8%	2.6%	1.2%	N/A
... born in Venezuela	2.0%	1.3%	0.7%	0.1%	N/A
... born in the Dominican Republic	1.3%	2.1%	1.6%	0.7%	N/A
... born in other countries	12.3%	15.1%	13.7%	9.0%	8.4%

As of 2000, Miramar had the fifth highest percentage of Jamaican residents in the United States, with 15.4% of the population, the 58th highest percentage of Colombian residents in the US, at 2.51% of the city's population, and the 48th highest percentage of Cuban residents in the US, at 8.77% of the city's population. It also had the 78th most Dominicans in the US, at 1.98%, while it had the 31st highest percentage of Haitians (tied with West Little River), at 6% of all residents. Miramar's Trinidadian community had the 12th highest percentage of residents, which was at 1.2% (tied with Wheatley Heights, New York, and Neptune City, New Jersey).

== Economy ==
Spirit Airlines moved to Miramar from Eastpointe, Michigan, in November 1999.

The Leadership in Energy & Environment Design in Miramar houses the Federal Bureau of Investigation (FBI) Miami field office and a General Services Administration (GSA) office; named after two FBI agents who died in the 1986 FBI Miami Shootout, it is a 330,000 square feet (31,000 m^{2}) Leadership in Energy & Environment Design (LEED) facility located on a 20-acre (8.1 ha) site. The FBI field office, previously in North Miami Beach, moved to Miramar on December 8, 2014. The building was dedicated on April 10, 2015.

Miramar Regional Park Amphitheater is a 90,000-square-foot (8,400 m^{2}) outdoor venue in Miramar Regional Park.

== Education ==
Miramar's public schools are under the Broward County Public Schools. Among the schools are Everglades High School and Miramar High School

=== Higher education ===
- Broward College (Miramar Town Center)
- Florida International University (Miramar West Center)
- Nova Southeastern University (Miramar Campus)
- University of Florida (MBA) (South Florida Campus)

== Media ==
Miramar is a part of the Miami–Fort Lauderdale–Hollywood media market, which is the twelfth largest radio market and the seventeenth largest television market in the United States.

== Notable people ==
- Shawn Barry, soccer player
- Jon Beason, American football player
- Jonathan Bolanos, soccer player
- Ato Bolden, Olympic runner
- Daniel Braverman, American football player
- Lionel Brown, soccer player
- Sheila Cherfilus-McCormick, U.S. Representative
- Wayne Cochran, soul singer
- Johnny Depp, actor
- Jason Derulo, singer
- Oronde Gadsden II, American football player
- Larry Gordon, American football player
- Tyler Hall, soccer player
- Alcee Hastings, U.S. Representative
- Tracy Howard, American football player
- Wayne Messam, mayor of Miramar
- Michael Mizrachi, professional poker player
- Geno Smith, American football player
- Elvis Trujillo, jockey

== See also ==
- 2019 Miramar shootout
