= Frontier Central School District =

School district in Hamburg, New York, U.S.

Address
- 5120 Orchard Ave Hamburg, New York; United States
- Coordinates: 42.7473°N 78.9003°W

District information
- Type: Public
- Grades: Pre-K/K–12
- Established: June 28, 1951
- Superintendent: Christopher J. Swiatek
- Asst. superintendent(s): Colleen Duggan (Instruction); Patrick Moses (Human Resources) Christopher Thuman (Business & Operations)
- School board: Seven members
- Chair of the board: Dr. Mary Ann Costello
- Schools: Elementary four, Middle one, High one
- Budget: $89,486,591 (2021–22)
- NCES District ID: 3611670
- Affiliation: Erie 1 BOCES

Students and staff
- Students: 4,477 (2024–2025)
- Teachers: 363.80 (on full-time equivalent basis, 2019–2020)
- Staff: 348 (2019–2020)
- Student–teacher ratio: 13.05 (2019–2020)

Other information
- Union: New York State United Teachers (NYSUT)
- Website: www.frontiercsd.org

The Frontier Central School District is the primary public school district serving the town of Hamburg, New York. The district serves most of the area surrounding the village of Hamburg and is an independent public entity. With authority from the State of New York, Frontier's seven-member Board of Education governs the district and selects the superintendent. The district's offices are at the Frontier Educational Center in Wanakah.

Frontier was formed in June 1951 as a consolidation of eight smaller school districts along Hamburg's lakeshore. Today, the district has six schools, including four elementary schools, one middle school, and one high school. Student enrollment for the 2024-25 school year is 4,447 and it spends an average of $17,429 per pupil and maintains a student-to-teacher ratio of 13:1 (which is well below the county average of $20,131 and the state average of $25,870).

The district is a member of the Erie 1 Board of Cooperative Educational Services (BOCES) system. In 2020, Buffalo Business First ranked Frontier as the fifteenth-best performing school district in the Western New York region. The Hamburg, West Seneca and Orchard Park central school districts serve the village and small portions of the town.

== History ==
Before the formation of the district, students in the hamlets and communities throughout the town of Hamburg were served by smaller school districts dating to the late 19th century. These included the Amsdell, Athol Springs, Big Tree, Blasdell, Lake View (Pinehurst), Shaleton, Wanakah (Cloverbank), and Woodlawn school districts. The Frontier Central School District took its name after the local phone exchange when a naming contest failed to produce suitable ones. The district was officially formed on June 28, 1951, as a consolidation of these districts and would therefore serve as the main school district along the lake shore of the town.

Early schools
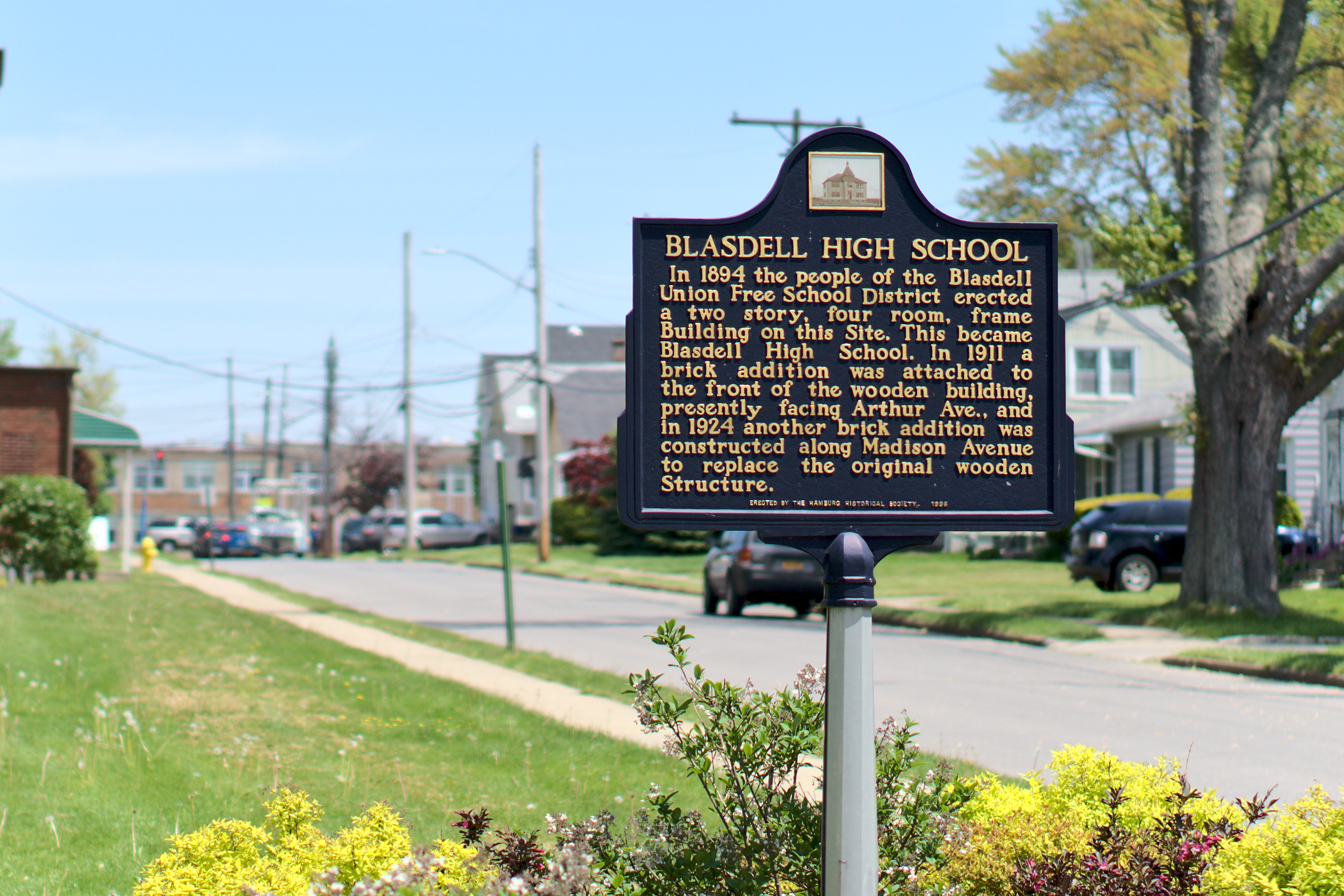
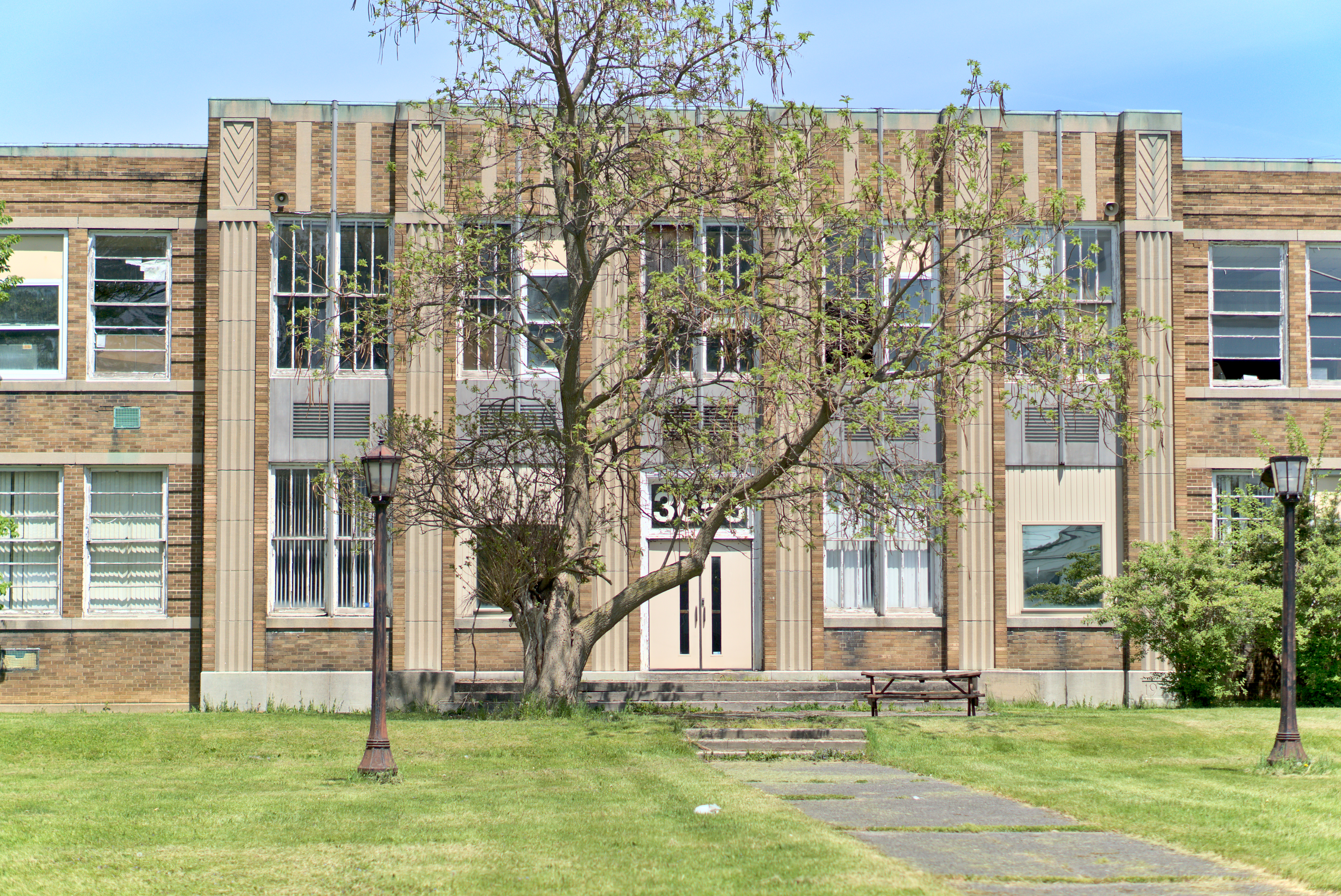
A 1996 historical marker commemorates Blasdell High School; the old Woodlawn School

Growing at a rapid pace and fueled by suburbanization, the new district was deemed too small to accommodate all of its students, and as a result a 112-acre (45 ha) high school campus and a new elementary school were approved for construction in 1953. Ground was broken for the Frontier Junior-Senior High School on January 23, 1954, with a low bid of $3.2 million ($38.5 million in 2025) for construction. Both the high school and Pinehurst in Lake View opened in 1955. Two additional schools, Cloverbank Elementary and Blasdell Elementary, opened in 1959, and a high school in Blasdell was reworked to accommodate some secondary school students.

In the early 1960s, the district believed it would have at least 7,000 students by the next decade. Residents approved the construction of a new middle school in 1963; the Amsdell Heights Junior High School opened in 1965. District officials saw the need to build more schools in the 1970s; however, district enrollment began declining after 1972, and voters rejected the school proposal.

The lack of newer school buildings and renovations to the older ones caused a strain on the district's operations in the 1980s and early 1990s. With this came the closure of older schools, including the former Woodlawn Elementary School. The district's proposed sale of the school in 1994 to the Deobandi school Darul Uloom Al-Madania faced community opposition and was blocked by a community referendum that January.

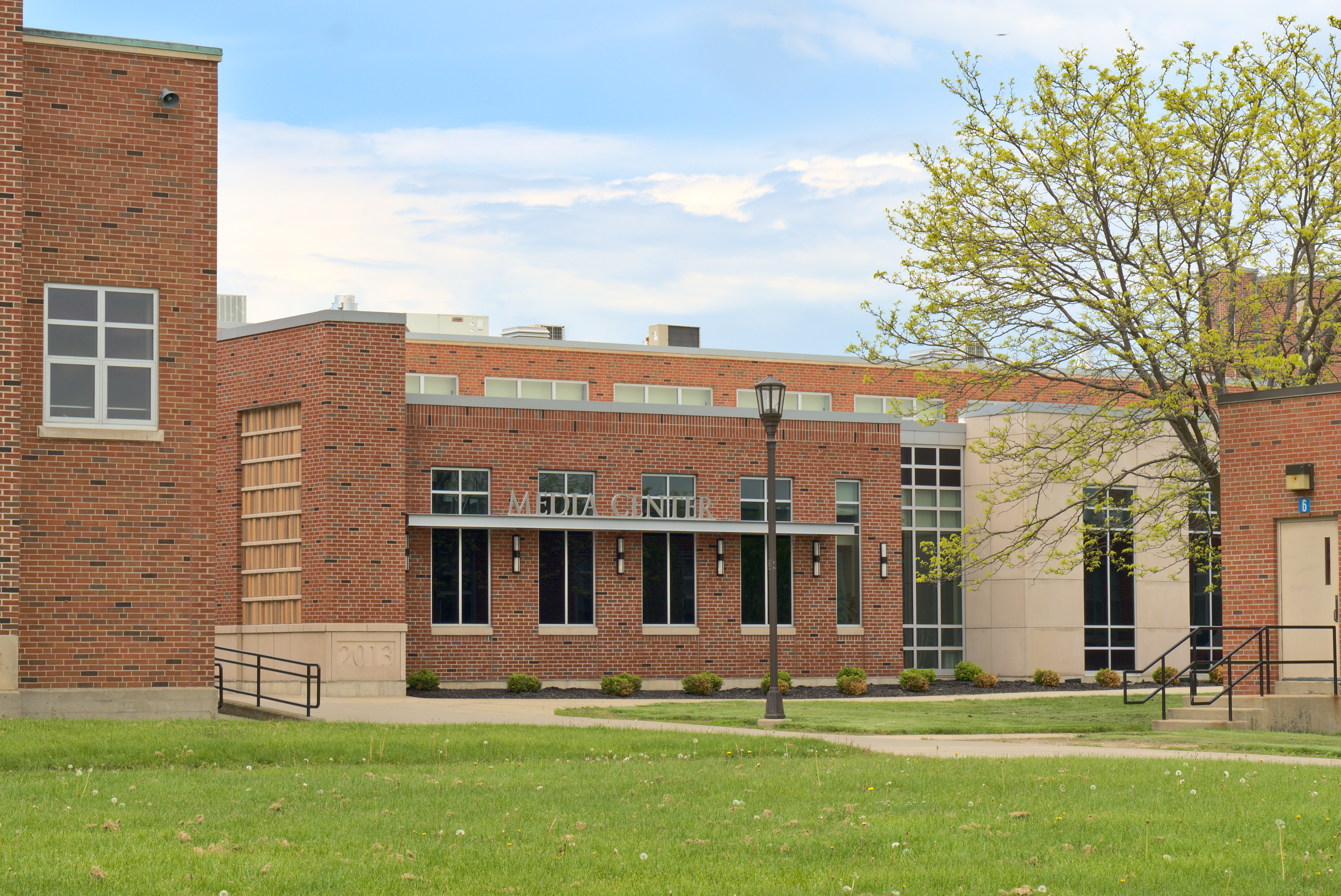
Capital improvements in 2014 included a new library for the high school.

With stable enrollments, the approval of a $17.6 million ($43.4 million in 2025) capital program in 1990 led to the renovations and expansions of the existing schools. In addition, a new primary school adjacent to the high school, Big Tree Elementary, was constructed in 1993. By 1998, the high school alone had $34 million ($67.2 million in 2025) invested into it over the previous ten years. Fiber-optic networking was installed district-wide beginning in 1999.

The district's former community center, the Frontier Community Learning Center, was constructed along Southwestern Boulevard in 2002. The Frontier Community Learning Center featured classrooms, offered seasonal courses, and later, a gymnasium. The district sold the community center in 2015 to the town of Hamburg, which now operates it as a senior services center. The district shifted away from overhead projectors to SMART Boards around the 2007–2008 school year. In 2019, Frontier secured funding from then-State Senator Chris Jacobs for a turf field replacement and scoreboard installation behind the high school, which was completed in 2020.

As with other school districts across the United States, Frontier took measures to implement distance learning at the onset of the COVID-19 pandemic to prevent the spread of the virus. Initially, students attended school remotely in March 2020. In the fall of 2020, the district opened the year with a transition to a hybrid in-person and virtual learning model.

== Location and area ==
The Frontier Central School District covers about 39 square miles (101.0 km^{2}) of land in the town of Hamburg, from the village of Blasdell in the north to the hamlet of Lake View in the southwest. Portions of the town of Hamburg not covered by the school district include areas adjacent to the village and other neighboring towns; the Hamburg, West Seneca, and Orchard Park central school districts serve these areas.

== Instruction ==
In 2020, Buffalo Business First ranked Frontier as the fifteenth-best performing school district in the Western New York region. The district employed 363 teachers for the 2019–2020 school year, providing educational services to children and students from pre-kindergarten (Pre-K) through twelfth grade. Two elementary schools and a local child care center offer daily Pre-K and Head Start sessions. Students are administered yearly math and English Language Arts (ELA) assessments by the New York State Education Department from grades three through eight. In grades four and eight, students take a science-based exam which includes a lab component. At the middle and high school levels, ten counselors offer guidance to students throughout the school year. Students take their Regents Exams, which are required to receive a diploma, in high school. 91% of 345 students graduated from Frontier High School in 2020, with 64% receiving an Advanced Regents Diploma. In 2016, the district began implementing its own independent educational standards alongside the Common Core State Standards Initiative and the state's Board of Regents standards.

Frontier supplies students with Chromebook laptops and iPads, transitioning from the iMac computers previously in use. In addition, the district uses Google Apps for Education for student email and document storage and SchoolTool for student record-keeping.

== Budget and administration ==
The Frontier Educational Center (FEC) is on Orchard Avenue in the hamlet of Wanakah, where it serves as the administrative and business head of the district. The FEC was previously home to the Wanakah School, which admitted first- and second-grade students until it was shuttered in 1993. Located within the FEC is the district's Board of Education, which selects the superintendent of schools, sets district policies, and oversees the budget, personnel, facilities and curriculum. Seven members serve four-year terms on the school board. The board began holding virtual meetings in the wake of the COVID-19 pandemic. The school district's current superintendent is Christopher J. Swiatek.

Frontier spends an average of $16,749 per pupil; its student–teacher ratio is 13:1 (the national averages in 2020 were $12,654 and 16:1 respectively), and as of 2021, the district's budget was $89,486,591.

== Demographics ==
Composition (2019–20)
- White: 88%
- Asian/Pacific Islander: 1%
- Hispanic: 5%
- Black: 1%
- American Indian/Alaska Native: 0%
- Multiracial: 4%

Source: The New York State Report Card, NYSED

In the 2019–20 school year, the Frontier Central School District enrolled approximately 4,612 students; of which 1,470 (32%) were considered economically disadvantaged or eligible for free or reduced-price lunch. The student body is 51% male and 49% female. 17% of students have reported disabilities.

Frontier CSD enrollment data, 2018–2019 (Note: 21 students were listed as "Ungraded Elementary" and 36 students were listed as "Ungraded Secondary"; they were added to the Elementary and High school rows respectively.)
Grade	Number of students	Percent
Early childhood education & Pre-kindergarten	136	3%
Elementary school (K-5)	2,160	44%
Middle school (6–8)	1,100	23%
High school (9–12)	1,396	29%

Enrollment in Frontier CSD since 1951

Year	Enroll.	±% p.a.
1951–1952	2,486	—
1952–1953	2,750	+10.62%
1958–1959	4,882	+10.04%
1959–1960	4,854	−0.57%
1960–1961	5,000	+3.01%
1961–1962	5,396	+7.92%

Year	Enroll.	±% p.a.
1962–1963	5,267	−2.39%
1972	7,200	+3.18%
1978–1979	6,241	−2.35%
1981–1982	5,828	−2.26%
1982–1983	5,634	−3.33%
1985–1986	5,183	−2.74%

Year	Enroll.	±% p.a.
1987–1988	4,920	−2.57%
1990–1991	4,840	−0.54%
1991–1992	4,809	−0.64%
1992–1993	5,006	+4.10%
2005–2006	5,462	+0.67%
2009–2010	5,351	−0.51%

Year	Enroll.	±% p.a.
2011–2012	5,080	−2.57%
2012–2013	4,979	−1.99%
2013–2014	4,956	−0.46%
2014–2015	4,866	−1.82%
2015–2016	4,834	−0.66%
2016–2017	4,773	−1.26%

Year	Enroll.	±% p.a.
2017–2018	4,722	−1.07%
2018–2019	4,666	−1.19%
2019–2020	4,612	−1.16%
2020–2021	4,520	−1.99%

- 1951–1952, 1952–1953, 1958–1959, 1959–1961, 1961–1962, 1962–1963, 1972, 1978–1979 1981–1983, 1985–1986, 1987–1988, 1990–1991, 1991–1993, 2005–2006, 2009–2010, 2011–2021

== Schools ==
=== Big Tree Elementary School ===
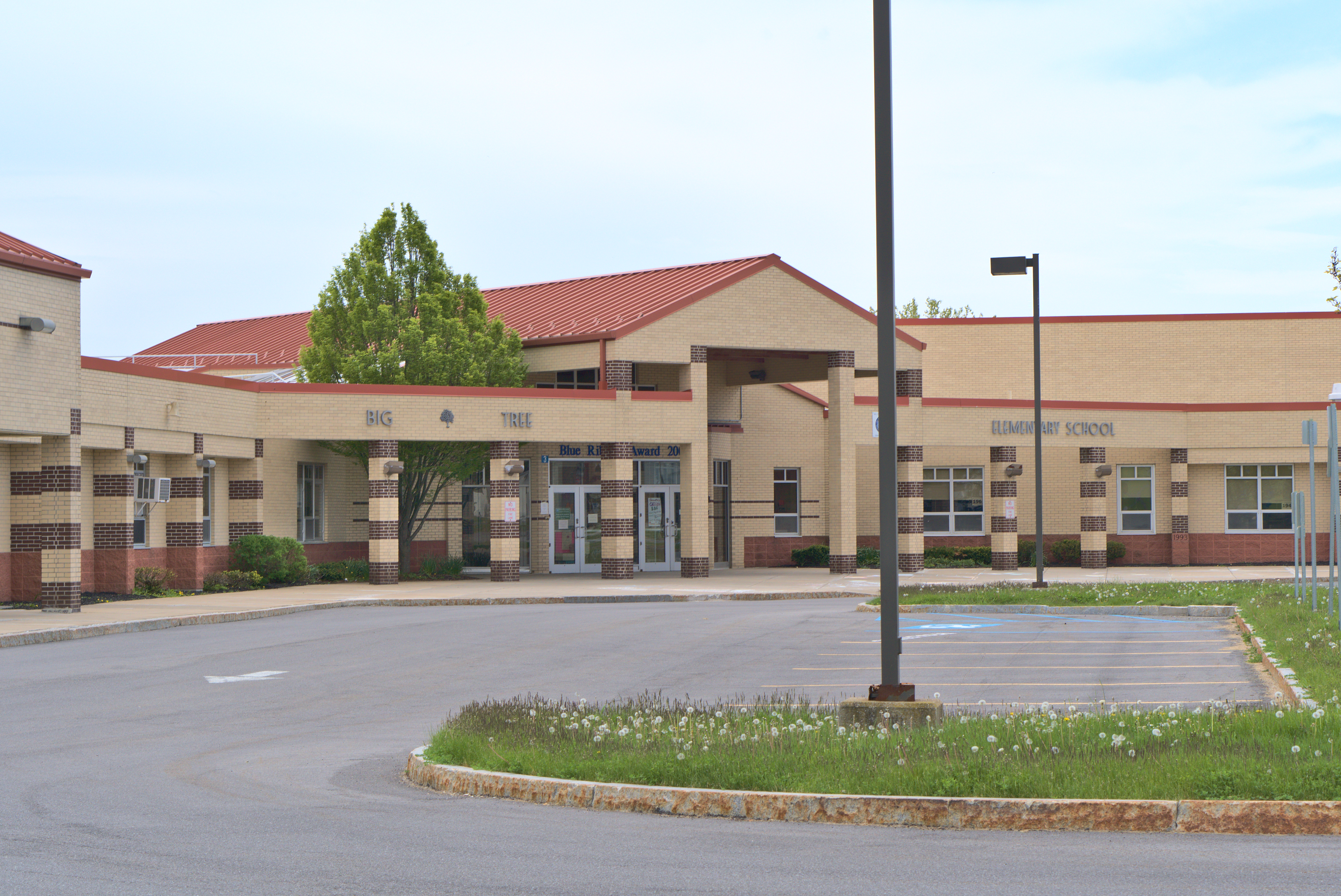
Big Tree Elementary School

Big Tree Elementary School is on Bayview Road, adjacent to Frontier High School. The school serves students in the town roughly between the areas of Blasdell and Wanakah, where Cloverbank Elementary is located. Two wings support classrooms for students from kindergarten through fifth grade. Before the construction of the present elementary school, several schools were constructed in the Big Tree area, beginning with a small schoolhouse in 1850. At least three additional schoolhouses were built, expanded or moved for the Big Tree district between 1870 and 1961, later reduced to a sole building on South Park Avenue after consolidation into the Frontier district. With its capacity of under 200 in the 1980s, students in the aging K-3 school were sent to the Wanakah, Blasdell and Woodlawn schools until the new Big Tree Elementary opened on September 11, 1993. Joanne C. Saniewski was principal of the school for seventeen years, during which it earned a Blue Ribbon Award in 2009. When the school surpassed a parent teacher association (PTA) goal by reading over 2.5 million minutes in 2006, Saniewski read a book from a hot-air balloon to the school's students.

=== Blasdell Elementary School ===
Blasdell Elementary School, on South Park Avenue, serves students in the village of Blasdell and the surrounding area, including the hamlet of Woodlawn. The school traces its history back to 1843, when the first schoolhouse was built near present-day Mile Strip Road. Population shifts slightly to the north saw Blasdell High School open in 1894, and other schools open in Woodlawn to the west. Functioning as a primary and secondary school throughout its time, the opening of the high school and continued district growth lead to the construction of the current school. The new Blasdell Elementary was built in 1958 and opened as an expansion for 781 elementary students on September 9, 1959, along with Cloverbank Elementary; the previous school became the Blasdell Annex. District reorganization and school closures over the subsequent decades saw the annex close and the current school expand to a K-5 grade structure. Capital improvements introduced an addition in 1998 which added thirteen classrooms. The school is bordered to the north and east by the Lackawanna, West Seneca and Orchard Park school districts, and to the south by Big Tree Elementary.

=== Cloverbank Elementary School ===
Cloverbank Elementary School is on Cloverbank Road near the hamlets of Wanakah, Clifton Heights, and Locksley Park. Student attendance extends along the lakeshore between Pinehurst Elementary in the southwest and Big Tree Elementary to the northeast. Before its construction, other schools serving students in the area included Athol Springs No. 10 (1920), the Wanakah School No. 5, and the Amsdell School No. 9. As the district grew, Cloverbank Elementary was planned and constructed as an expansion school. It was built in 1958 and opened along with Blasdell Elementary to 824 students on September 9, 1959. An expansion in 1998 added thirteen classrooms. The school houses students from kindergarten through fifth grade.

=== Pinehurst Elementary School ===
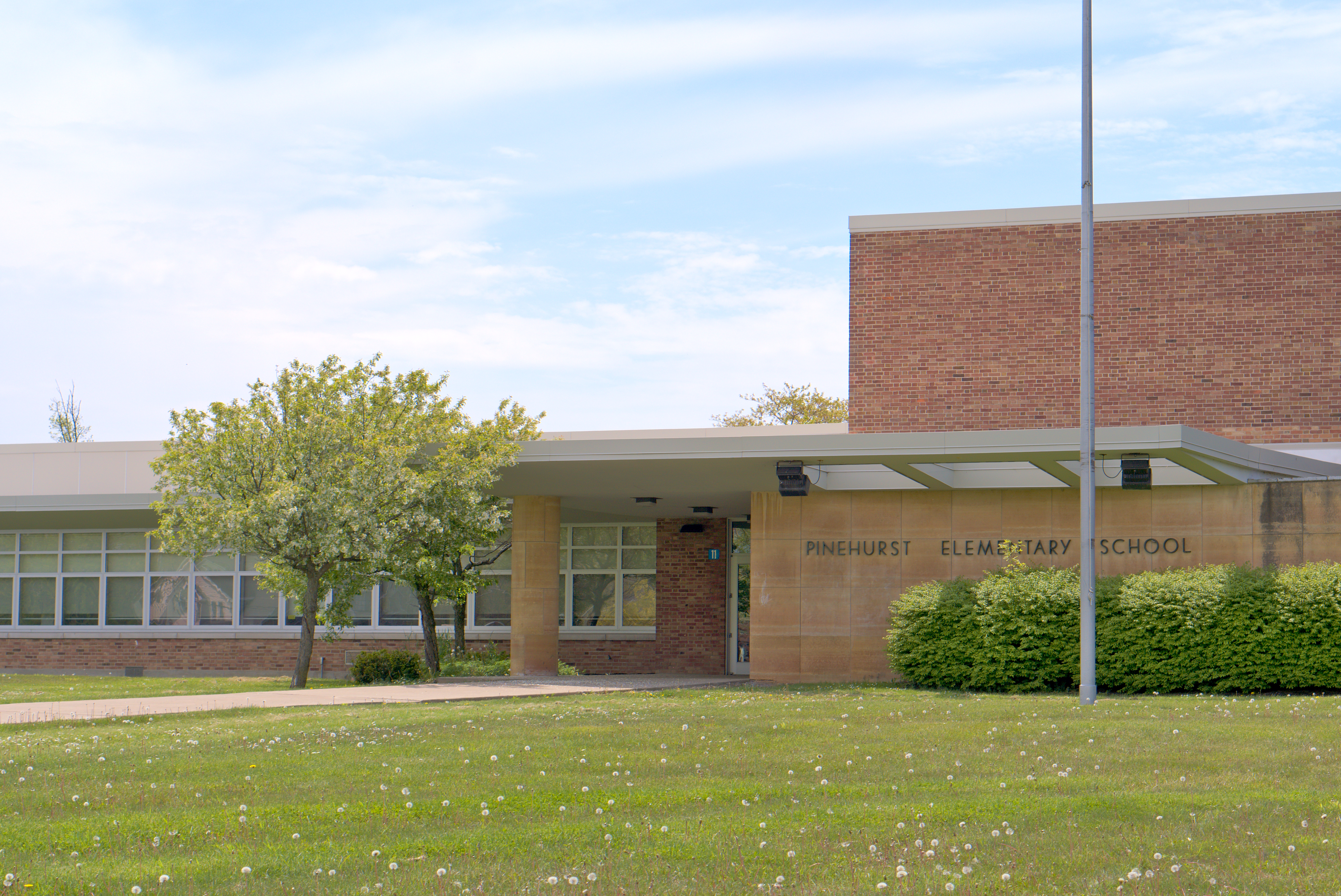
Pinehurst Elementary School

Pinehurst Elementary School, on Fairway Court in Lake View, is the original elementary school in the district. The school serves students in the area of the town roughly between Eighteen Mile Creek and Cloverbank Elementary. The next school to the southwest is Highland Elementary of the Lake Shore Central School District, approximately 2 miles (3.2 km) away in the hamlet of Derby. Before its construction, at least five schools existed in the area from 1795 to 1921, including a log cabin. Pinehurst opened on February 28, 1955, and was dedicated on February 26, 1956, taking in students from other schools such as Wanakah up to grade eight. In 1993, the school expanded: sixteen classrooms, a kitchen and cafeteria were added to the school. Today, students from kindergarten through fifth grade attend Pinehurst.

=== Frontier Middle School ===
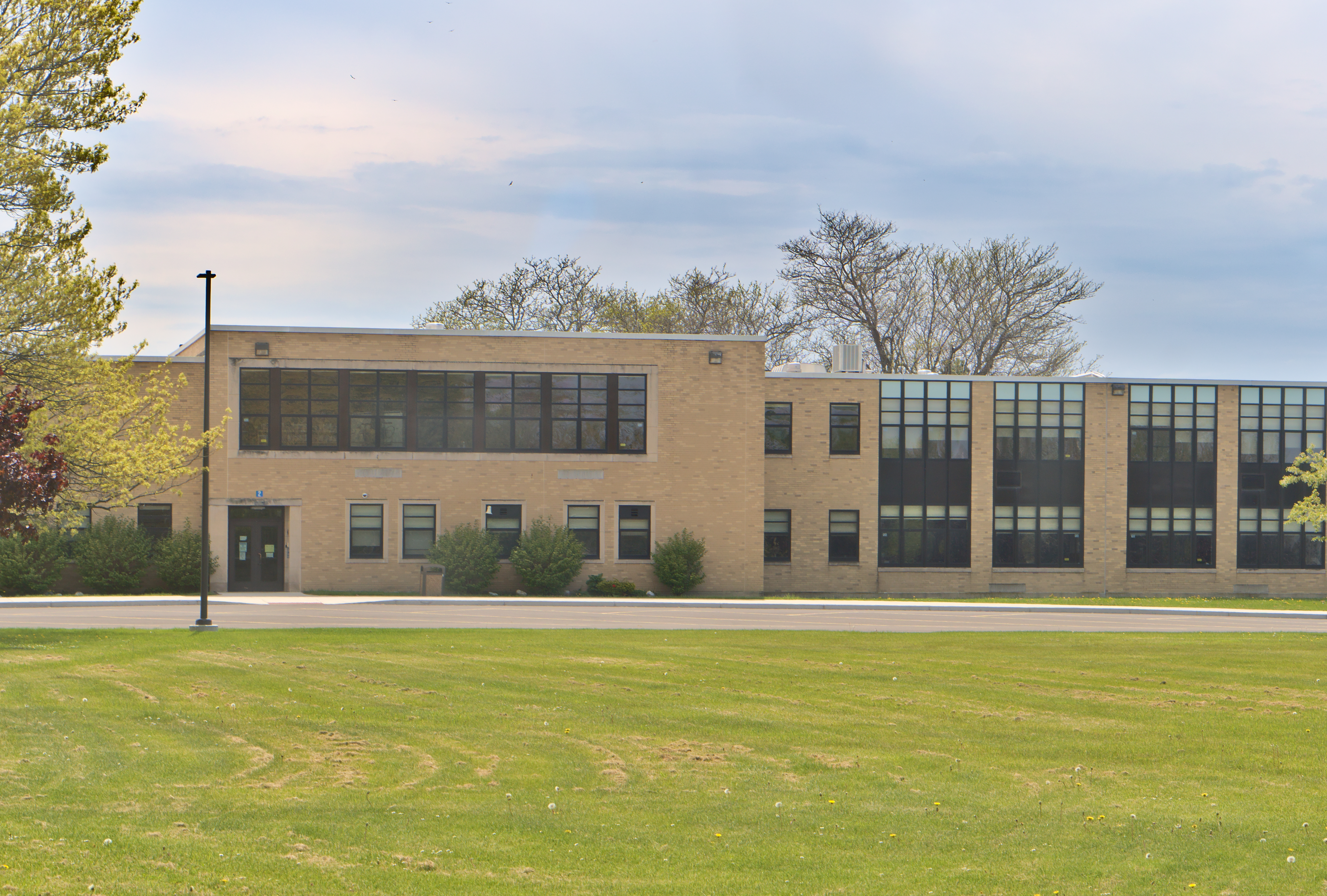
Frontier Middle School

Frontier Middle School was built in 1964 (cornerstone laid on November 17, 1965, has 1964 inscribed on it) and opened on September 8, 1965, with 1,327 students as Amsdell Heights Junior High School. The building was dedicated on December 9, 1965. The school's current name dates from 1993, while shifting from grades 7–9 to grades 6–8. At the middle school, students begin their foreign language courses and have the opportunity to enroll in advanced math. An expansion in the late 1990s added a music room and a second gym; a second expansion in early 2000s added a two-story wing with several classrooms. Located on Amsdell Road in the southwest portion of the town, students in grades 6–8 attend the middle school. The school had 96 teachers in 2020. As of the 2019–20 school year, enrollment was 1,142 students. During the 2021-2022 school year, the middle school collaborated with a construction firm to initiate a comprehensive overhaul. Throughout that period, the pool was closed due to the presence of asbestos necessitating a complete renovation of the plumbing system. In the following 2022-2023 school year, all lockers were repainted in 'Falcon Blue', and a brand new rear parking lot was finished. That summer, the locker rooms underwent a similar renovation. By the onset of the 2023-2024 school year, the locker rooms were fully refurbished, and the main gymnasium's lighting had been upgraded to energy-efficient LED bulbs. The pool was completed on July 14, 2024.

==== Student body ====
The student body consists primarily of incoming students from Big Tree, Blasdell, Cloverbank and Pinehurst Elementary schools. About 32% of students are considered economically disadvantaged and may qualify for free or reduced-price lunches. The demographics of the school are 87% White (non-Hispanic), 2% Black or African American, 1% Asian, 6% Hispanic or Latino, and 4% multiracial. Its student-teacher ratio is 12:1.

In 2008, 1,450 middle school teachers, staff and students participated in a large outdoor group photo, forming a 100-foot (30 m) wide red, white and blue eagle. Subsequent photos were taken at other schools in the district and elsewhere in the country. Each November, the school's student council organizes its annual fundraiser Bald for Bucks, which raises thousands of dollars to benefit Roswell Park Comprehensive Cancer Center. The school has a chapter of the National Junior Honor Society.

=== Frontier High School ===
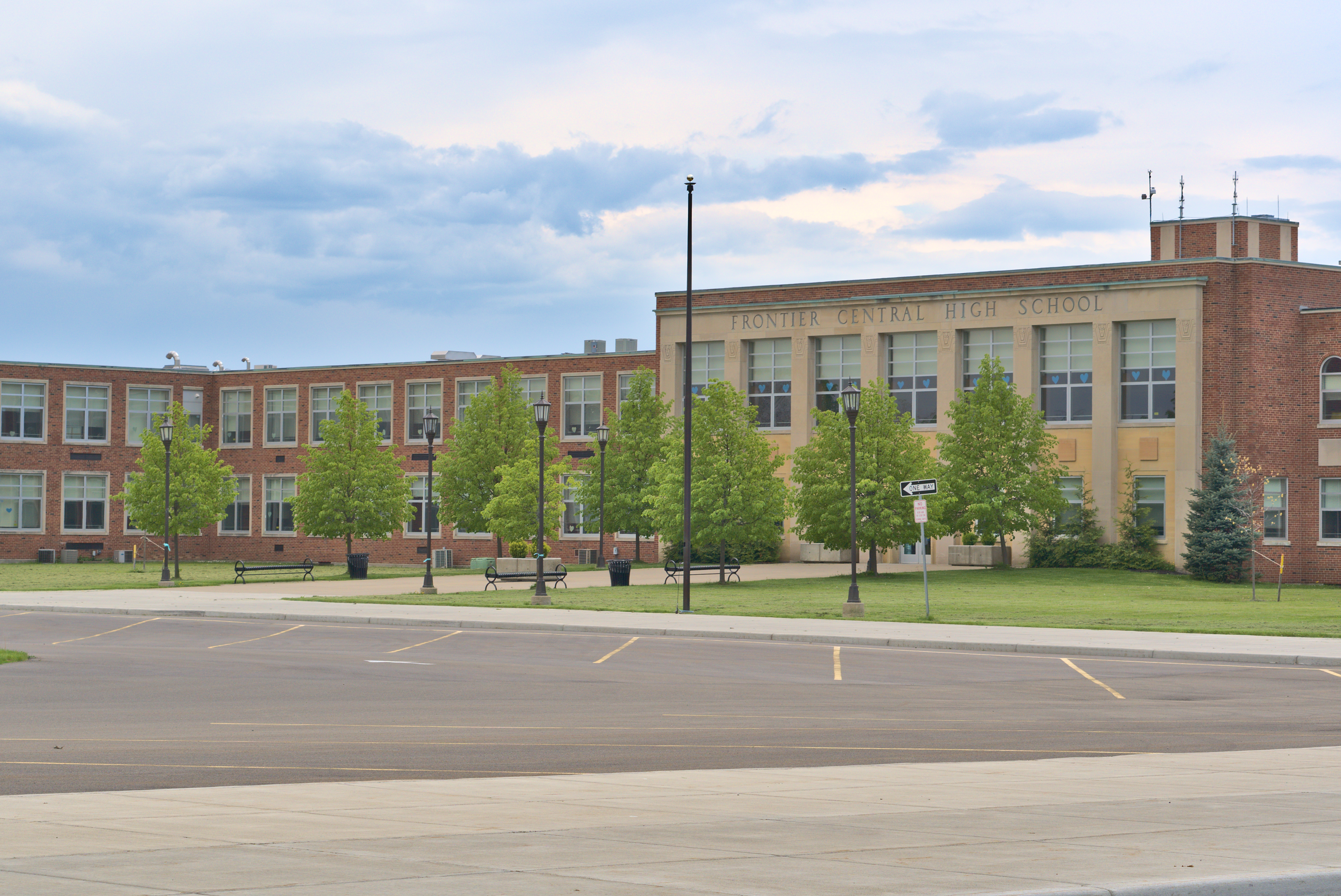
Frontier Central High School

Frontier Central High School is on Bayview Road in the north-central area of the district. It replaced Blasdell High School on Madison Avenue on September 7, 1955, which had been in operation as such since 1894. Students from the ninth through twelfth grades attend the school. The school has 1,363 students and a 12:1 student-to-teacher ratio.

At the high school, students are offered the opportunity to take ten Advanced Placement classes, courses from SUNY Erie, Hilbert College and SUNY Niagara, and vocational classes with Erie 1 BOCES in nearby West Seneca. The school offers over two dozen clubs and activities and over 64 varsity sports teams and began operating a student-run food truck in 2019.

The high school has expanded three times. The first expansion was in 1993 with an eight-room foreign language education wing and secondary gymnasium and the second in 1998 with 23 classrooms. The third expansion came in 2013, when capital improvements saw the addition of a new library media center and secured vestibule. The renovations were completed in 2014.

== Transportation ==
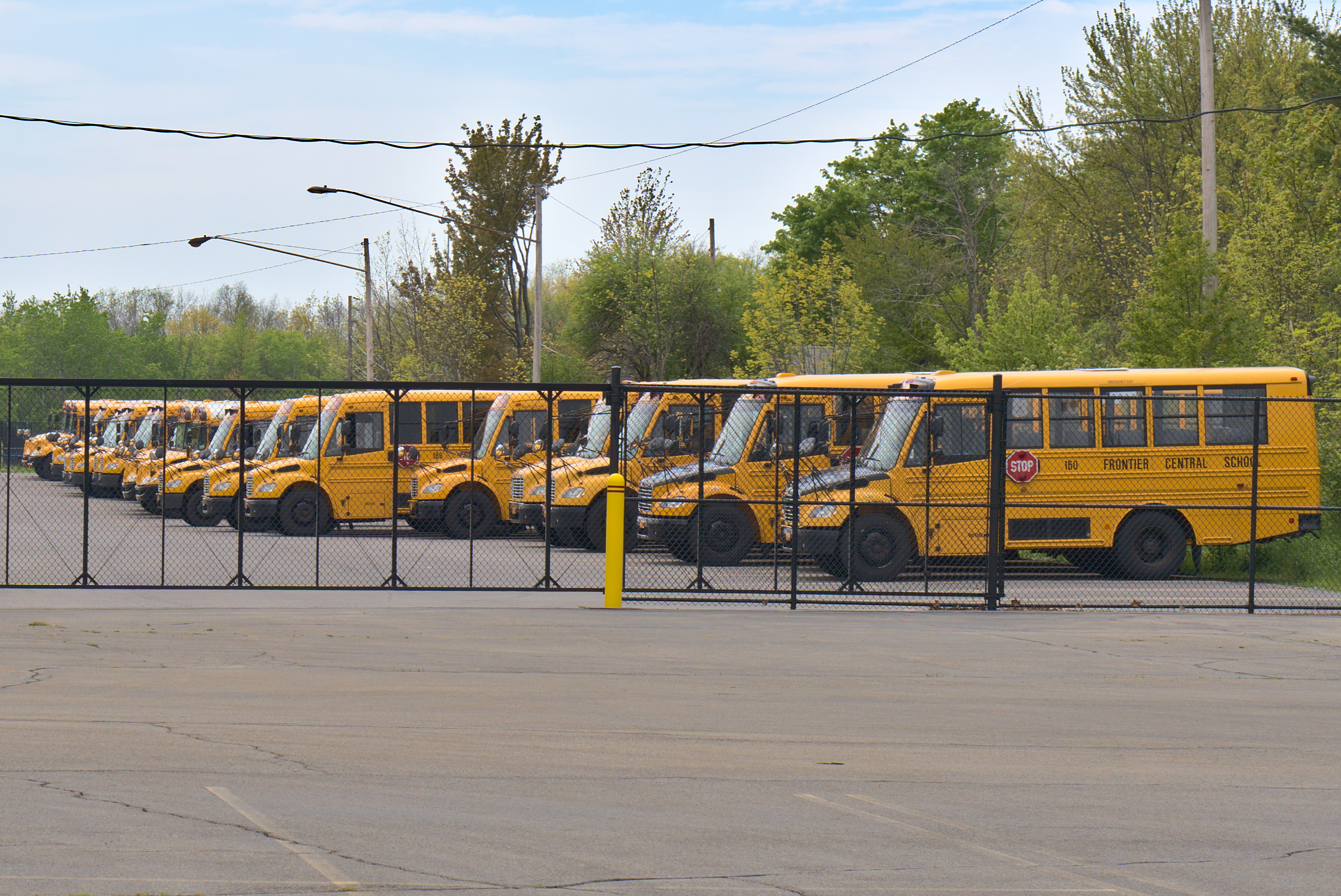
Several Thomas Saf-T-Liner C2 school buses operated by Frontier

School buses are operated by the district; the bus garage is next to the high school on Bayview Road. There are 86 buses in the fleet as of April 2021. Each neighborhood is assigned an attendance zone and corresponding elementary school by the Board of Education for efficiency of operations. In 2019, the district began deployment of a system for parents to track their child's bus.

== See also ==
- List of Buffalo metropolitan area schools
- List of school districts in New York
