= Frontier Middle School =

Frontier Middle School may refer to:

- Frontier Middle School, the middle school of the Frontier Central School District in Hamburg, New York
- Frontier Middle School in Natrona County School District Number 1, Casper, Wyoming
- Frontier Middle School in the Wentzville R-IV School District, O'fallon, Missouri
