= Hamburg Middle School =

Hamburg Middle School may refer to:

- Hamburg Middle School, of the Hamburg Community School District, Hamburg, Iowa
- Hamburg Middle School or Hamburg Central Middle School, of the Hamburg Central School District, Hamburg, New York
