= Tim Calkins =

Tim Calkins may refer to:

- Tim Calkins (professor) (born 1965), professor of marketing at Northwestern University
- Tim Calkins (wrestler), professional wrestler
