= NASCAR Craftsman Truck Series at Watkins Glen International =

NASCAR Truck Series race at Watkins Glen International

Bully Hill Vineyards 176 at The Glen

NASCAR Craftsman Truck Series
- Venue: Watkins Glen International
- Location: Watkins Glen, New York
- Corporate sponsor: Bully Hill Vineyards
- First race: 1996
- Last race: 2026
- Distance: 176.688 miles (284.352 km)
- Laps: 72; Stage 1: 20; Stage 2: 20; Final stage: 32
- Previous names: Parts America 150 (1996–1998); Bully Hill Vineyards 150 (1999–2000); United Rentals 176 at The Glen (2021); Mission 176 at The Glen (2025)
- Most wins (driver): Ron Fellows (2)
- Most wins (team): Roush Racing; Tricon Garage (2)
- Most wins (manufacturer): Chevrolet; Toyota (3)

Circuit information
- Surface: Asphalt
- Length: 2.454 mi (3.949 km)
- Turns: 7

The NASCAR Craftsman Truck Series has competed at Watkins Glen International in Watkins Glen, New York, on a varying basis. The race was known as the Bully Hill Vineyards 176 at The Glen.

Introduced in 1996 as part of a Truck Series schedule expansion, the inaugural running was won by Ron Hornaday Jr. Being on a road course, the race attracted road course ringers with road racing experience. It was removed from the calendar in 2000 due to scheduling conflicts, but was re-added in 2021 as the Truck Series' final race before the NASCAR playoffs. The race was dropped again in 2022, and then was re-added to the schedule for the 2025 season.

== History ==
The first NASCAR Craftsman Truck Series event at Watkins Glen International was held in 1996, as one of eight new tracks added to the schedule that season, and the only road course among them. The inaugural Parts America 150 took place on August 25, two weeks after the NASCAR Winston Cup Series' The Bud at The Glen; Cup drivers like Joe Nemechek and Geoff Bodine, who owned Truck Series teams, also ran the Truck race to develop additional familiarity with the track. Bodine, who won the Cup race, had not planned to run the race but chose to do so after receiving an entry fee from the track. The weekend, which included support races by the NASCAR Busch Series and Featherlite Modified Tour, attracted what track press director J. J. O'Malley described as "an awful lot of interest" partly due to the Truck Series' rise in popularity and the presence of Cup drivers. Steve Park, driving Nemechek's truck, was the fastest driver in qualifying to win the pole position but did not participate in the race as Nemechek returned to the ride. Nemechek started the race last and finished second behind Ron Hornaday Jr., who took the lead from Mike Skinner on lap 21 and led the rest of the race.

1997 Parts America 150 trucks

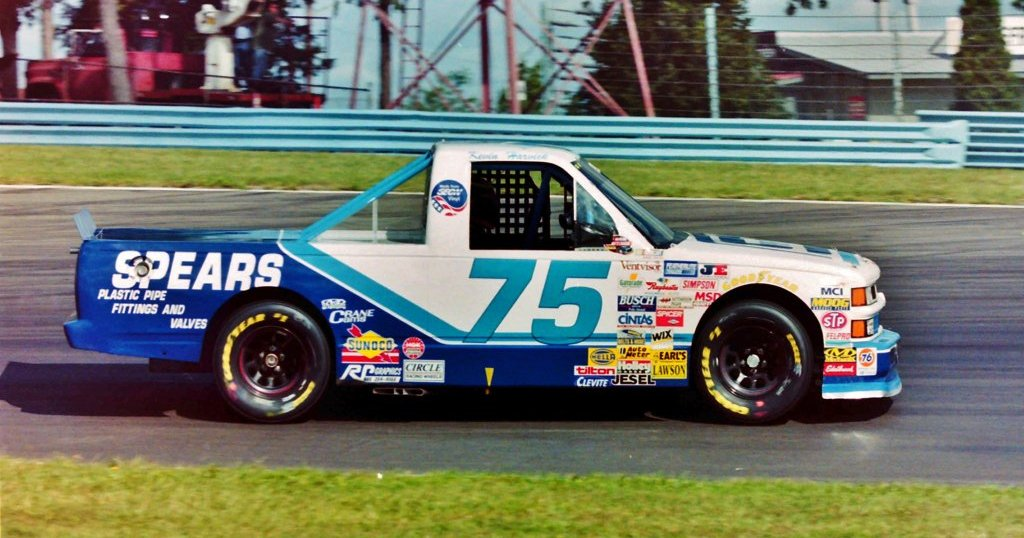
Kevin Harvick's No. 75 Spears Motorsports Chevrolet

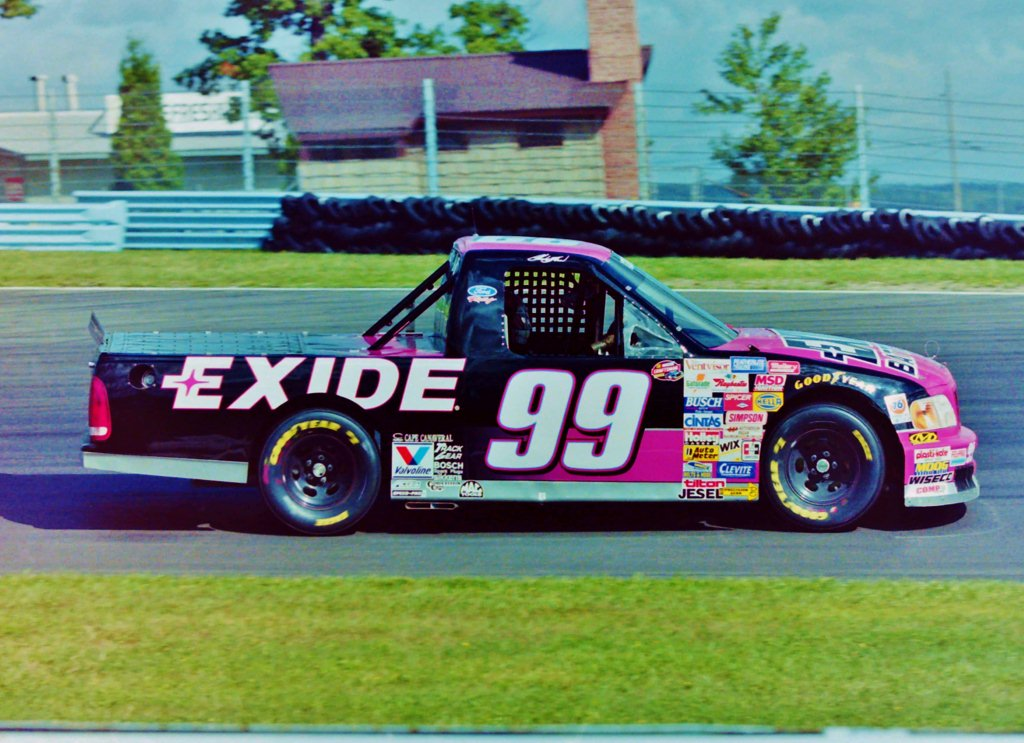
Chuck Bown's No. 99 Roush Racing Ford

The 1997 Parts America 150's qualifying session was delayed by rain and oil on the track. Ron Fellows won the pole and eventually the race after passing points leader Jack Sprague for the lead with seven laps remaining and successfully conserving his fuel. Fellows, a road course ringer who won at Watkins Glen in the Trans-Am Series in 1994 and 1995, was the first Canadian driver to win a race in the series; he did so in his third career start and for a team that did not reserve a garage space as the entry had been hastily arranged. He was also the only race winner in 1997 that did not run the full Truck schedule.

For 1998, the Parts America 150 was moved to May to better serve as an undercard for the Cup race and provide opportunities for NASCAR to make changes to the track for the parent series if necessary. Fellows won the pole with a track-record lap time of 1:15.079 (surpassing his 1997 time of 1:15.149), while among the seven drivers who failed to qualify was Lonnie Rush, who rolled his truck twice in practice and was forced to qualify in a replacement from Jeff Spraker. In the race, Hornaday was the first to cross the finish line but received a two-second time penalty for jumping the final restart, and the win was given to runner-up Joe Ruttman.

Renamed the Bully Hill Vineyards 150 and moved to June for 1999, the race was the first on the newly-repaved "NASCAR" layout that was 2.4 miles (3.9 km) in length. Held in conjunction with the Busch Series, the weekend was promoted as a "Festival of Speed and Sound" and included musical performances by artists like Blessid Union of Souls and Edwin McCain. Rain during practice for the race led to the first usage of Goodyear's rain tire in a NASCAR points-awarding race weekend. Once again starting from the pole, Fellows overcame a late pit stop necessitated by an oil-covered windshield to catch leader Mike Wallace and pass him with five laps left.

The 2000 race saw championship leader and pole sitter Greg Biffle lead the final 13 laps to win his third consecutive race and fourth in the last five events, with Kurt Busch following to clinch a Roush Racing 1–2 finish. Sprague rebounded from an opening-lap spin that dropped him to 32nd to finish third, while Fellows finished fifth after starting last in a backup truck after his brake pedal failed during qualifying and caused him to miss the race in his original entry.

The race was dropped from the schedule in 2001 due to scheduling conflicts as Watkins Glen officials had attempted to organize for a weekend close to July 4, but the lone available date on July 8 clashed with the Truck date at Kansas Speedway. As a result, the 2001 Truck Series calendar exclusively featured oval tracks.

After a two-decade absence, Watkins Glen returned to the Truck schedule in 2021 as the 15th and final race before the Playoffs; it was also one of four road course events on the initial schedule, the most in series history. According to track president Michael Printup, the date became available as travel restrictions in response to the COVID-19 pandemic resulted in other tracks canceling their races.

NASCAR revealed the race distances in January, with Watkins Glen's being 72 laps long and divided into stages of 20, 25, and 27 laps. United Rentals assumed title sponsorship for the race in July. Lightning and scheduling concerns related to the Xfinity race later in the day resulted in the United Rentals 176 being shortened to 61 laps, with Austin Hill being declared the winner as he was the leader at the time of the stoppage.

Watkins Glen was dropped for a second time in 2022. Printup responded to the news by commenting, "Of course we want it back again, but we have to work with NASCAR and see if we can get it in the schedules." The track was added again for 2025, as the second to last race of the regular season. Mission Foods also took over naming rights to the race, who also sponsors the O'Reilly race.

In 2026, the race moved from August to May along with the Cup and O'Reilly Series races at Watkins Glen, and Bully Hill Vineyards, a winery located in the Finger Lakes area near the racetrack, returned as the title sponsor of the race, replacing Mission Foods.

== Past winners ==
Year	Date	No.	Driver	Team	Manufacturer	Race Distance		Race Time	Average Speed (mph)	Report	Ref
Year	Date	No.	Driver	Team	Manufacturer	Laps	Miles (km)	Race Time	Average Speed (mph)	Report	Ref
1996	August 25	16	Ron Hornaday Jr.	Dale Earnhardt, Inc.	Chevrolet	61	149.5 (240.6)	1:34:45	94.639	Report	
1997	August 24	48	Ron Fellows	Hess Racing	Chevrolet	62	151.9 (244.45)	1:33:12	97.79	Report	
1998	May 30	99	Joe Ruttman	Roush Racing	Ford	65*	151.9 (244.45)	1:49:06	87.58	Report	
1999	June 26	87	Ron Fellows	NEMCO Motorsports	Chevrolet	62	151.9 (244.45)	1:48:15	84.194	Report	
2000	June 24	50	Greg Biffle	Roush Racing	Ford	62	151.9 (244.45)	1:46.55	85.244	Report	
2001 – 2020	Not held										
2021	August 7	16	Austin Hill	Hattori Racing Enterprises	Toyota	61*	149.45 (240.496)	1:42:43	87.298	Report	
2022 – 2024	Not held										
2025	August 8	11	Corey Heim	Tricon Garage	Toyota	81*	198.774 (319.895)	2:34:56	76.852	Report	
2026	May 8	11	Kaden Honeycutt	Tricon Garage	Toyota	74*	181.596 (292.250)	2:10:43	82.218	Report	

=== Notes ===
- 1998, 2025 and 2026: Races extended due to a green–white–checker finish.
- 2021: Race shortened due to weather.

=== Multiple winners (drivers) ===
# Wins	Driver	Years won
2	Ron Fellows	1997, 1999

=== Multiple winners (teams) ===
# Wins	Team	Years won
2	Roush Fenway Racing	1998, 2000
2	Tricon Garage	2025, 2026

=== Manufacturer wins ===
# Wins	Make	Years won
3	(United States) Chevrolet	1996, 1997, 1999
3	(Japan) Toyota	2021, 2025, 2026
2	(United States) Ford	1998, 2000
