= Hamburg, New York =

Town in New York, United States

- Town
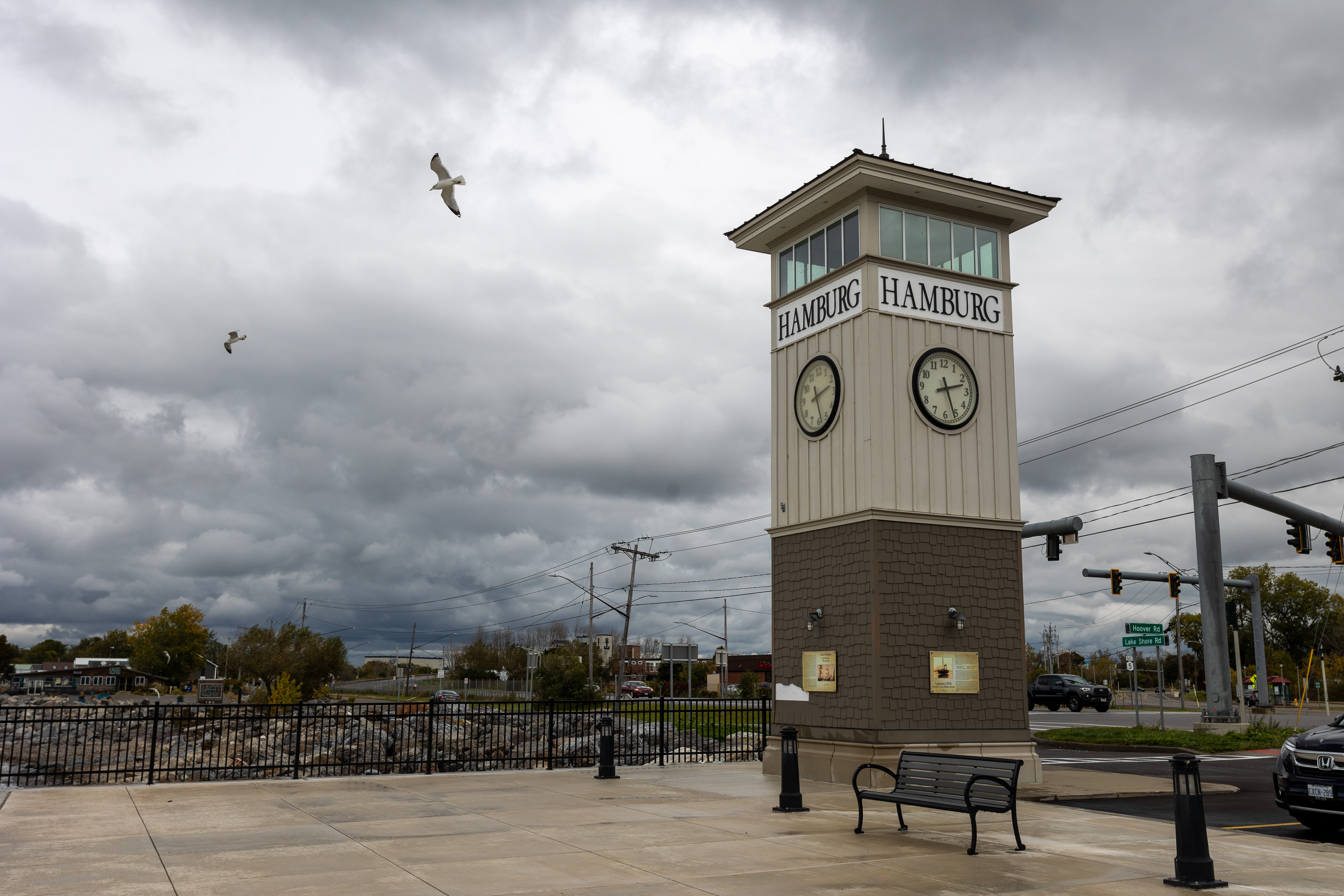

- Seal
- Motto(s): The Town That Friendship Built
- Location of Hamburg in Erie County and New York

- Location within the state of New York
- Coordinates: 42°44′40″N 78°51′30″W
- Country: United States
- State: New York
- County: Erie
- Incorporated: 1812; 214 years ago
- Named for: Hamburg, Germany

Government
  - Type: Town board
  - Body: Hamburg Town Board
  - Town Supervisor: Elizabeth Farrell-Lorentz

Area
  - Total: 41.35 sq mi (107.10 km^{2})
  - Land: 41.32 sq mi (107.03 km^{2})
  - Water: 0.027 sq mi (0.07 km^{2})
- Elevation: 732 ft (223 m)

Population (2020)
  - Total: 60,085 ▲
  - Density: 1,405.9/sq mi (542.83/km^{2})
- Demonym: Hamburger
- Time zone: UTC-5 (EST)
  - Summer (DST): UTC-4 (EDT)
- ZIP Codes: 14075 (Hamburg); 14085 (Lake View); 14219 (Blasdell); 14127 (Orchard Park); 14218 (Lackawanna)
- Area codes: 716, 624
- FIPS code: 36-029-31654
- GNIS feature ID: 0952086
- Website: townofhamburgny.gov

Hamburg is a town in Erie County, New York, United States. The population was 60,085 at the time of the 2020 census. It is named after the city of Hamburg, Germany.

The town is on the western border of the county and is south of Buffalo. Hamburg is one of the Southtowns in Erie County. The villages of Hamburg and Blasdell are located within the town – along with the census-designated place of Wanakah. The town of Hamburg was founded in 1812 in Armor.

== History ==
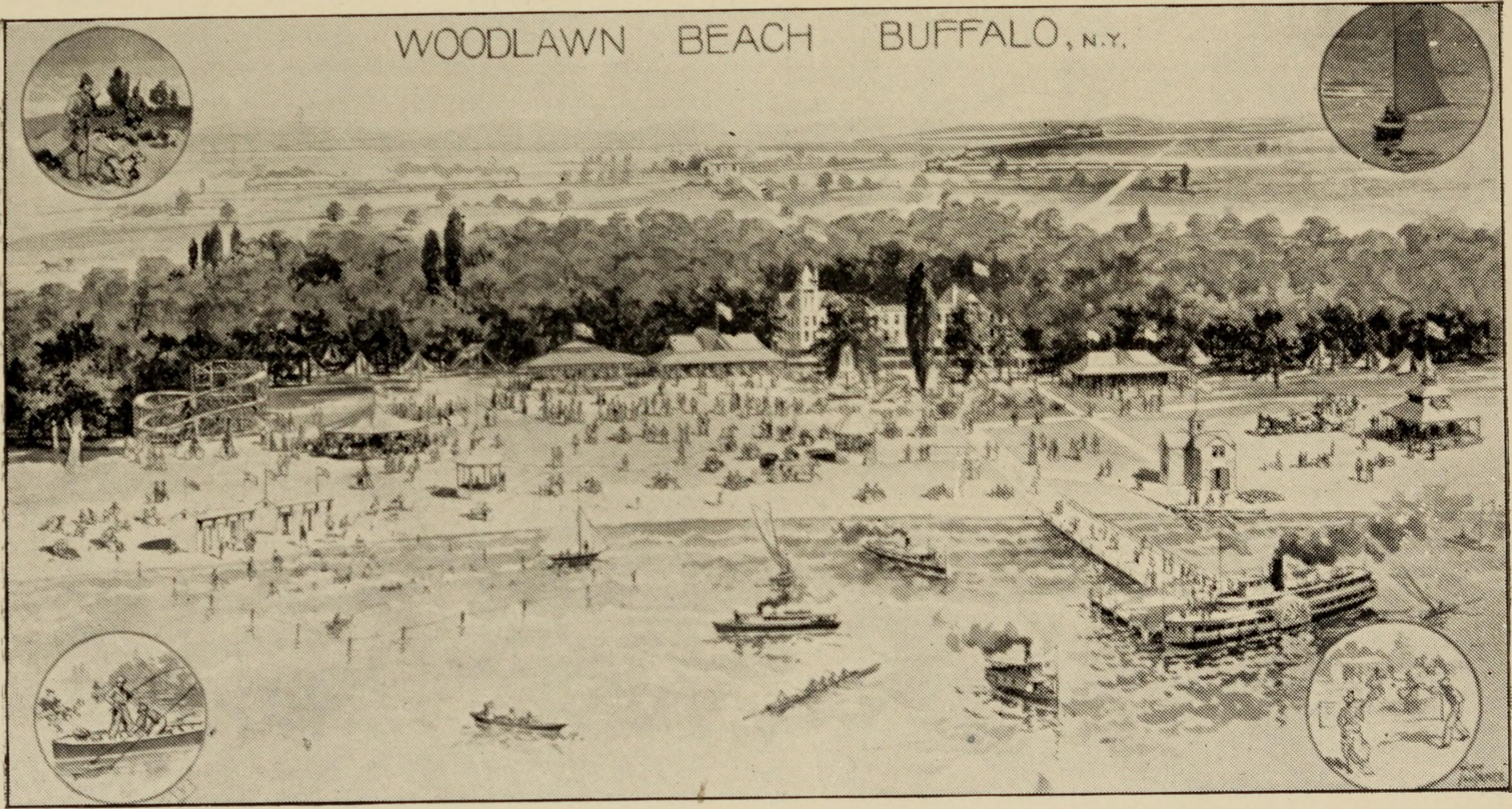
Vintage illustration of Woodlawn Beach in 1896

Historical evidence shows the area was settled originally by the Erie people. Around 1805 the settlement was known as "Barkerville", named after Zenas Barker, the postmaster. The earliest settlers were Nathaniel Titus and Dr. Ruth Belden in 1804, and the first landowner in the area was John Cummings, who built the first grist mill in 1806.

The town of Hamburg was formed by government decree on March 20, 1812, from the (now defunct) town of Willink. The first town meeting took place on April 7, 1812, at Jacob Wright's tavern at Wright's Corners, which was renamed Abbott's Corners, and now Armor. One of the early noted activities of the town board that year was to place a $5 bounty on wolf hides, due to the complaints of the local settlers who were being bothered by them.

In 1815, mail routes were established. The earliest settlers in the area were from New England. Germans started arriving in the 1830s and set up many successful farms. On November 29, 1824, a meeting was held in Abbott's Corners at the home of early settler Seth Abbott. At a vote of those present, agreement was reached to form a library with the sum of $102.

By 1850, the town was reduced by the formation of the towns of East Hamburgh and West Seneca. Around 1852, the Erie Railroad was built through the area. In 1868 the Erie County Fair came to the town and has been there since that time. In 1875, the weekly publication of the Erie County Independent began. This is now known as The Sun. Telephone service in the area started in 1886.

The village of Hamburg set itself off from the town in 1874 by incorporating as a village.

Starting in 1890 and to support the growing regional steel industry, Polish and Italians began to arrive in the area.

In 1897, a group of women known as the Nineteenth Century Club started a permanent free public library, known as the Hamburg Free Library. Until 1901 it was in various rented buildings. The Hamburg Free Library was moved into a Carnegie library on Center Street on November 8, 1915, where it remained until 1966 when the current library at 102 Buffalo Street opened.

In 1898, the community of Blasdell set itself apart from the town by incorporating as a village.

A trolley car system was established in the early 1900s.

The Kleis Site, containing the remnants of a 17th-century Iroquoian village and burial ground, was listed on the National Register of Historic Places in 1979.

In July 2012, Main Street in the village of Hamburg from Lake Street to Buffalo Street was granted state approval for nomination as a national historic district.

== Geography ==
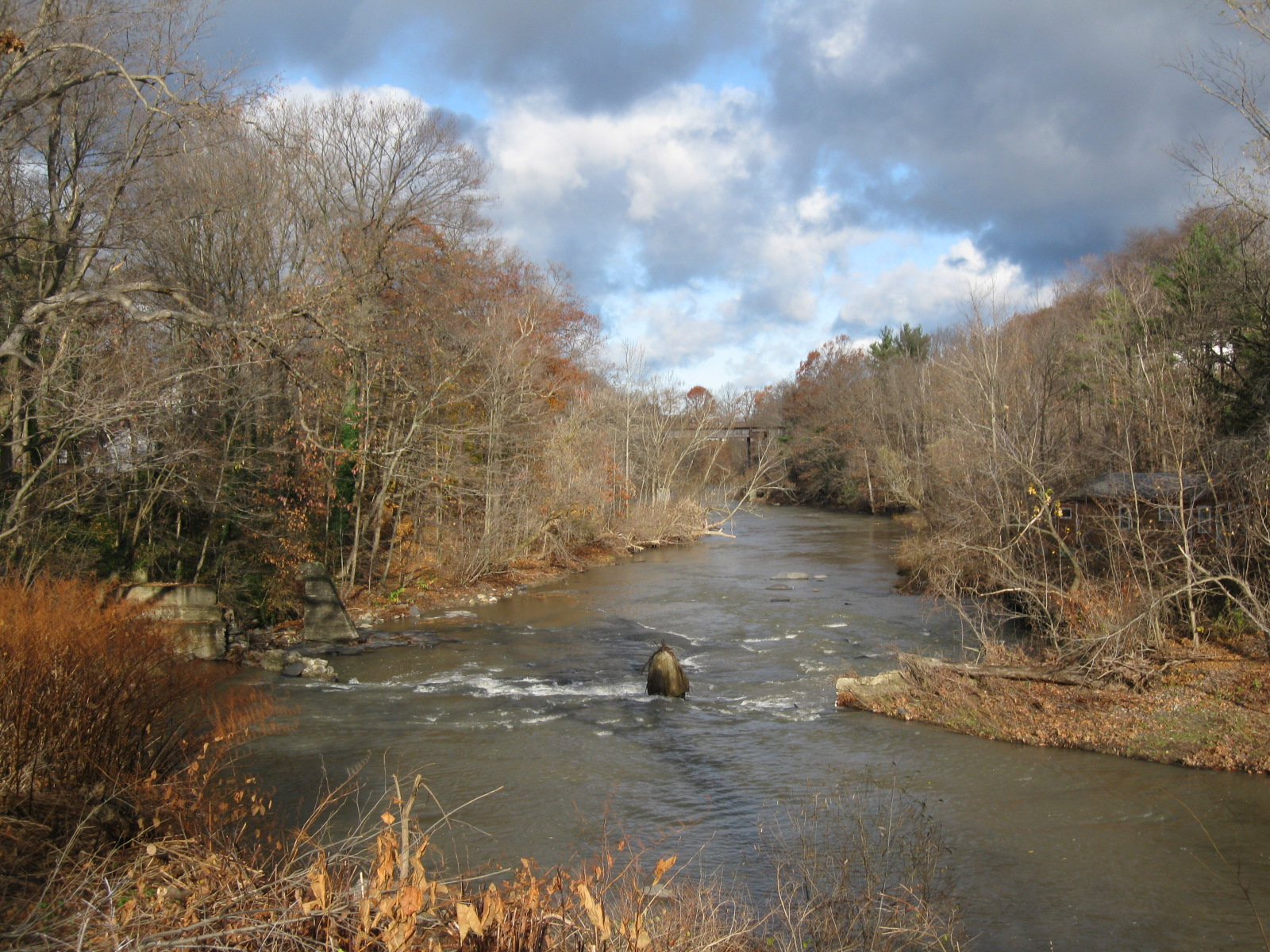
Eighteen Mile Creek in Hamburg

According to the United States Census Bureau, 41.4 square miles (107.1 km^{2}), of which 41.3 square miles (107.0 km^{2}) is land and 0.03 square miles (0.07 km^{2}), or 0.07%, is water.

Lake Erie forms the western border of the town, and Eighteen Mile Creek forms the southern boundary.

=== Climate ===
Hamburg experiences a continental climate (Köppen Dfb), heavily influenced by lake-effect snow from Lake Erie. It experienced a record 81.2 inches (206.25 centimeters) of snow November 16–18, 2022.

== Demographics ==
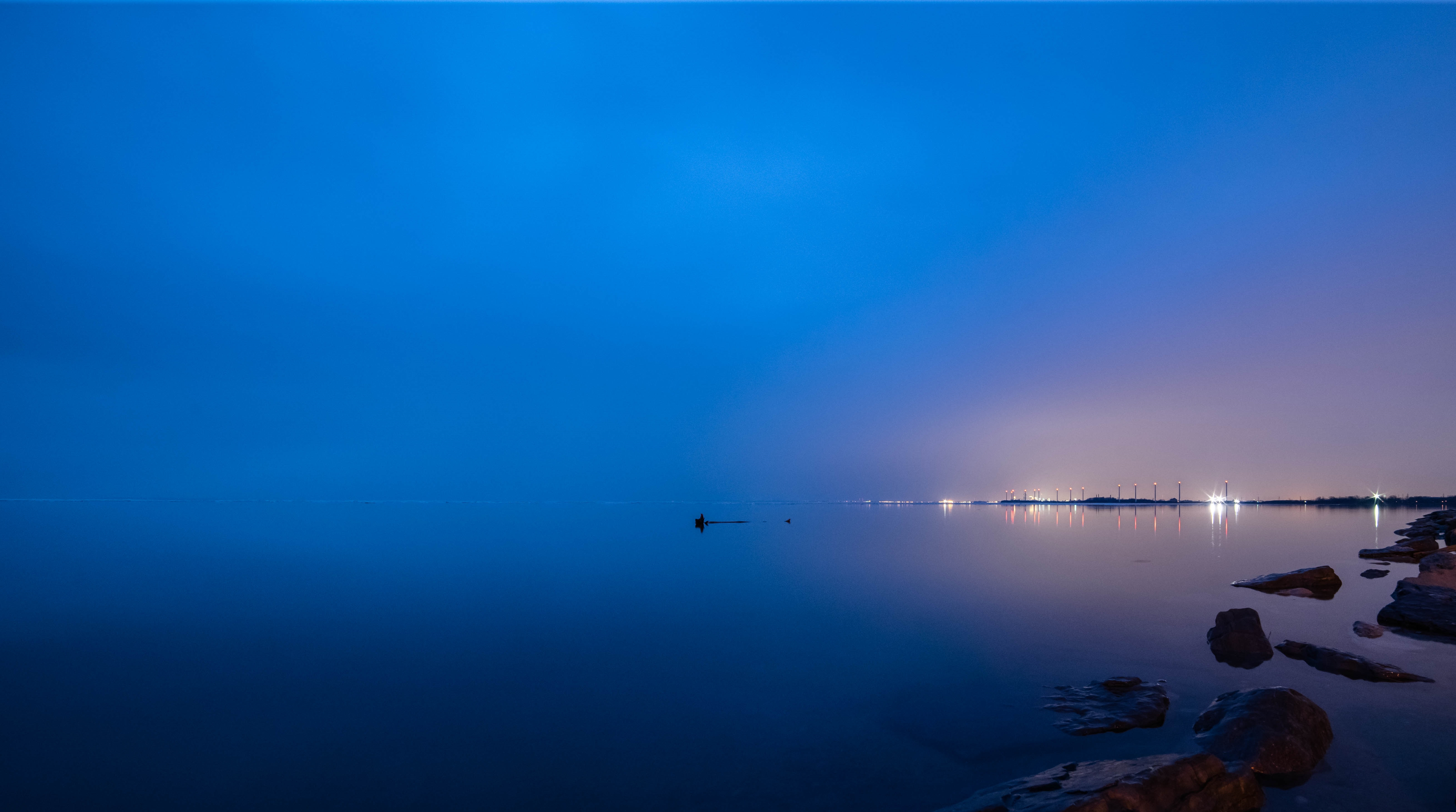
Evening view of Buffalo from Bayview Road in Hamburg. Steel Winds Urban Wind Farm can be seen in the distance.

Historical population
Census	Pop.	Note	%±
1820	2,034		—
1830	3,348		64.6%
1840	3,727		11.3%
1850	5,219		40.0%
1860	2,991		−42.7%
1870	2,934		−1.9%
1880	3,234		10.2%
1890	3,802		17.6%
1900	4,673		22.9%
1910	6,059		29.7%
1920	8,656		42.9%
1930	13,058		50.9%
1940	17,190		31.6%
1950	25,067		45.8%
1960	41,288		64.7%
1970	47,644		15.4%
1980	53,270		11.8%
1990	53,735		0.9%
2000	56,259		4.7%
2010	56,936		1.2%
2020	60,085		5.5%
Historical Population Figures

As of the census of 2000, there were 56,259 people, 21,999 households, and 15,157 families residing in the town. The population density was 1,362.7 inhabitants per square mile (526.1/km^{2}). There were 22,833 housing units at an average density of 553.1 per square mile (213.6/km^{2}). The racial makeup of the town was 97.93% White, 0.49% Black or African American, 0.20% Native American, 0.39% Asian, 0.01% Pacific Islander, 0.38% from other races, and 0.60% from two or more races. Hispanic or Latino of any race were 1.56% of the population.

There were 21,999 households, out of which 32.3% had children under the age of 18 living with them, 55.7% were married couples living together, 10.1% had a female householder with no husband present, and 31.1% were non-families. 26.4% of all households were made up of individuals, and 11.8% had someone living alone who was 65 years of age or older. The average household size was 2.51 and the average family size was 3.07.

In the town, the population was spread out, with 24.8% under the age of 18, 6.9% from 18 to 24, 28.6% from 25 to 44, 24.6% from 45 to 64, and 15.1% who were 65 years of age or older. The median age was 39 years. For every 100 females, there were 90.9 males. For every 100 females age 18 and over, there were 86.5 males.

The median income for a household in the town was $47,888, and the median income for a family was $56,974. Males had a median income of $41,440 versus $27,602 for females. The per capita income for the town was $21,943. About 3.2% of families and 4.5% of the population were below the poverty line, including 4.2% of those under age 18 and 6.9% of those age 65 or over.

== Economy ==
The economy in the town is supported by a wide variety of sectors, including logistics, manufacturing, healthcare, commerce and education. In Blasdell, the Ford Motor Company operates a stamping plant with over one thousand employees. Also along the waterfront is the Lake Erie Industrial Park, formed by the town's industrial development agency. This site includes the primary FedEx Ground warehouse for the Buffalo metropolitan area, employing 300 people, and an Amazon, Inc. distribution center.

== Arts and culture ==
The Erie County Fair has operated in Hamburg since 1868. Currently, the fair takes place at the Hamburg Fairgrounds. The Fair is situated on a 275-acre (111 ha) plot of land near the village of Hamburg. The fair is produced by the Erie County Agricultural Society, and runs for twelve days in August. Since 1924, Strates Shows has operated the midway at the Fair. The Erie County fair is the third-largest county fair in the United States.

It is claimed that the 1885 Erie County Fair, or "Hamburg Fair" is the place at which the hamburger sandwich was invented. According to the legend, Frank and Charles Menches were food vendors at the 1885 Erie County Fair, and created a sandwich of use of ground beef, coffee, brown sugar and other ingredients, and sold with ketchup and sliced onions. They named the successful sandwich after the fair they invented it at. To this end, the annual Hamburg BurgerFest is held in Hamburg during the summer.

== Sports ==
Sports teams in the town include the Frontier Falcons, representing Frontier Central High School, and the Hamburg Bulldogs, who represent Hamburg High School. The Red Raiders represent the St. Francis High School, a private, Franciscan/Catholic boys school. The Hawks represent Hilbert College, a private Franciscan/Catholic college in town. Hilbert has numerous NCAA division three sports teams including but not limited to basketball, football, women's hockey, soccer and lacrosse.

== Parks and recreation ==
The Seaway Trail, a National Scenic Byway, travels through Hamburg on New York Route 5, along the Lake Erie shoreline.

Woodlawn Beach State Park, on the shore of Lake Erie, was opened as a state park in 1996, and has been operated since 2011 by the town of Hamburg under a ten-year agreement with New York State.

== Government ==
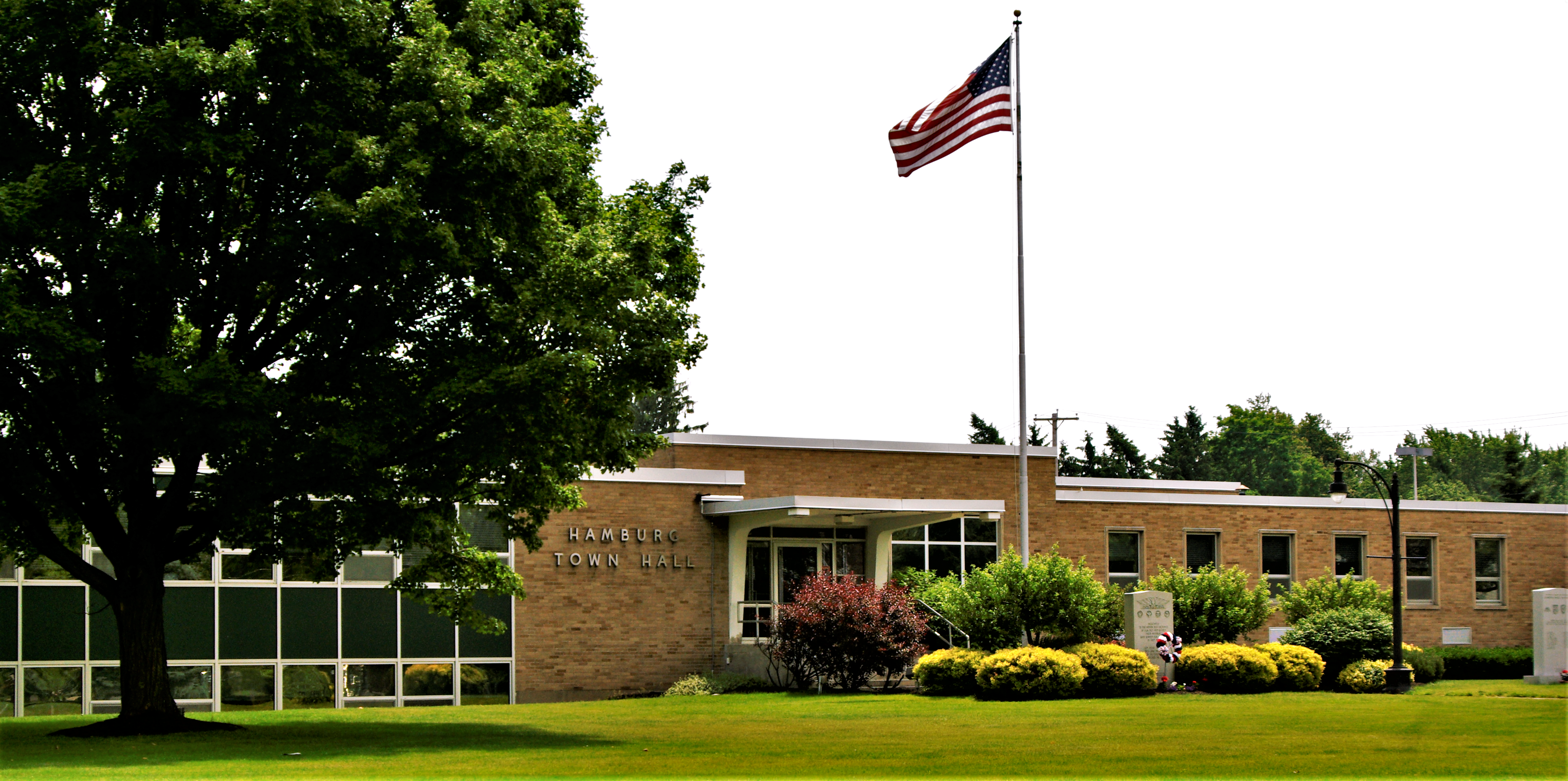
Hamburg Town Hall

Hamburg is governed by a five-member town board. The town supervisor is Elizabeth Farrell-Lorentz. The town was founded in 1812.

== Education ==
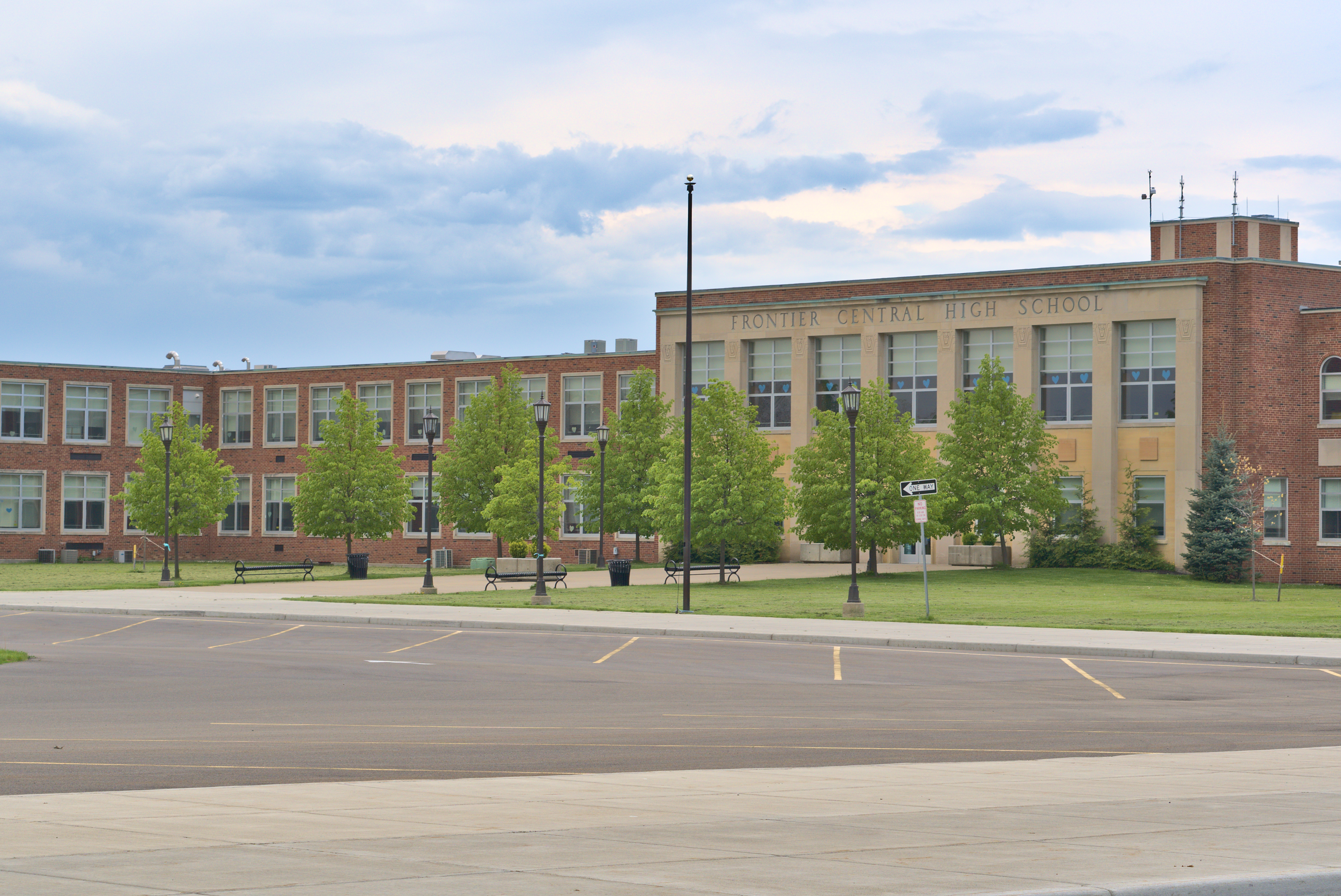
Frontier Central High School

=== Early childhood education ===
As of 2021, there were 10 preschools within the town, including 2 in the village of Blasdell.

=== Primary and secondary schools ===
The town of Hamburg is home to the Frontier Central School District, which is its primary public school district. The district serves students living outside of the village of Hamburg along the lake shore of the town, and is an independent public entity. Frontier was created in the 1950s, combining the Amsdell, Athol Springs, Big Tree, Blasdell, Lake View (Pinehurst), Shaleton, Wanakah (Cloverbank), and Woodlawn school districts dating to the 19th century. The district's offices are located at the Frontier Educational Center in Wanakah. The district serves over 4,500 students with its Big Tree, Blasdell, Cloverbank, and Pinehurst elementary schools, Frontier Middle School, and Frontier High School. In 2009, Big Tree Elementary School was recognized as a Blue Ribbon School. In 2020, Buffalo Business First ranked Frontier as the fifteenth-best performing school district in the Western New York region. Other districts serve Hamburg along the town's boundaries, including the Hamburg, West Seneca and Orchard Park central school districts.

The Hamburg Central School District mainly serves students living within the village of Hamburg, but also serves students living in areas adjacent to it. Both Frontier and Hamburg Central are members of the Erie 1 Board of Cooperative Educational Services system. The Hamburg, West Seneca and Orchard Park central school districts serve the village and small portions of the town.

=== Higher education ===
Hilbert College is in Hamburg, north of the village of Hamburg.

== Media ==
The town's weekly newspaper is the Hamburg Sun.

== Infrastructure ==
The New York State Thruway (Interstate 90), U.S. Route 62, US 20, and NY Route 5 pass through the town. NY 75 runs through the village of Hamburg, temporarily concurrent with Route 62. U.S. 20A diverges from US 20 north of the village of Hamburg as both routes proceed east.

Five bus lines operated by the Niagara Frontier Transportation Authority (NFTA) serve the town. A park and ride facility is between NY 5 and NY 75 near Athol Springs.

== Notable people ==
- Lucius Allen, former Wisconsin State Assembly member
- Thomas L. Bunting, former U.S. congressman
- Brendan A. Burns, U.S. Army major general
- Tim Calkins, clinical professor of marketing and author
- Eugene Asa Carr, U.S. Civil War general and Medal of Honor recipient
- Peter Case, singer/songwriter, founding member of the Nerves and the Plimsouls, and noted musicologist
- Clyde Brion Davis, author and journalist
- Manly Fleischmann, Defense Production Administrator for the Korean War, chairman of the Fleischmann Commission
- Katharine Houghton Hepburn, feminist social reformer
- Joel Heinen, academic, environmentalist, author
- Kathy Hochul, governor of New York
- E. Howard Hunt, author, CIA officer and Watergate conspirator
- John Huntly, former Wisconsin State Assembly member
- Jack Kemp, 1996 Republican Party U.S. vice presidential nominee who lived in Hamburg.
- Jim Kubiak, retired NFL quarterback (born in hamlet of Athol Springs)
- Daniel N. Lockwood, former U.S. congressman
- Howard J. Osborn, former Director of Security at the CIA
- John R. Pillion, former U.S. congressman
- Francis J. Pordum, former New York State Assembly member (from Lake View)
- Michael Printup, motorsport executive and former President of Watkins Glen International
- Jack Quinn, President of Erie Community College, former U.S. congressman, former Town of Hamburg Supervisor
- Jack Quinn III, former New York State Assembly member
- Frank Resetarits, lacrosse player
- Stephen J. Roberts, veterinarian, professor, polo player and coach
- Erik Schlopy, former Olympic ski racer
- Bob Schmidt, former pro football player
- Jake Schum, NFL punter
- Kevin Smardz, former New York State Assemblyman
- Tom Telesco, general manager of the Las Vegas Raiders
- Tom Toles, editorial cartoonist
- Susan Walsh, former competitive swimmer
- Joe Whelan, distance runner
- Dave Wohlabaugh, retired NFL center
- John Wrench, mathematician
- Tommy Z, blues musician

== See also ==
- List of towns in New York
