= Hamburg Sun =

Newspaper published in Hamburg, New York, US

- Type: Weekly newspaper
- Format: Broadsheet
- Owner: Buffalo News
- Publisher: Brian Connolly
- Editor: James Farrell
- Founded: 1875
- Headquarters: 5599 Camp Road. Hamburg New York 14075, United States
- Circulation: 7,974 (as of 2017)
- OCLC number: 18680125
- Website: sun-news.com

The Hamburg Sun is a weekly subscription-based newspaper that covers local news and sports in Erie County, New York, including in the towns of Hamburg, Eden, Evans, Brant and North Collins, as well as the villages of Angola, Farnham and Blasdell. It is published on Thursdays and had a circulation of 7,974 as of 2017.

The Hamburg Sun is considered to be a newspaper of record for Erie County.

== History ==
The Hamburg Sun was founded in 1875 as The Erie County Independent by Alex Stolting and was published in Hamburg and Buffalo, New York. The paper was sold to J. W. Constantine five years later, then to Charles G. Miller in 1882.

In 1945, former employee Dick Allen purchased the Independent for $500 and changed the name to Hamburg Sun. Allen, a native of Hamburg, had been employed in newspaper and public relations in Chicago before enlisting to fight in World War II. On returning from the war he decided to settle down in his hometown, starting his own Hamburg Sun publication before purchasing the Independent and merging the two papers.

The Hamburg Sun ceased publication briefly in 2016 its corporate owner, Community Papers of Western New York, claimed bankruptcy, two years after taking ownership from Metro News.

The paper was put up for auction after the collapse. Since February 2017, it has been owned by The Buffalo News, a subsidiary of Lee Enterprises.
