= Locksley Park, New York =

Hamlet in New York, United States

Coordinates: 42°45′44″N 78°52′45″W

Locksley Park is a hamlet in the town of Hamburg in Erie County, New York, United States.
