= John Huntly =

American politician

John Huntly was an American politician. He was a member of the Wisconsin State Assembly in 1882 and 1883. Additionally, he was town clerk of Avon, Wisconsin and a justice of the peace. He was a Republican. Huntly was born on April 10, 1847, in Hamburg, New York.
