= Buffalo Stamping Plant =

Automotive factory in Buffalo, NY

Coordinates: 42°47′13″N 78°50′35″W

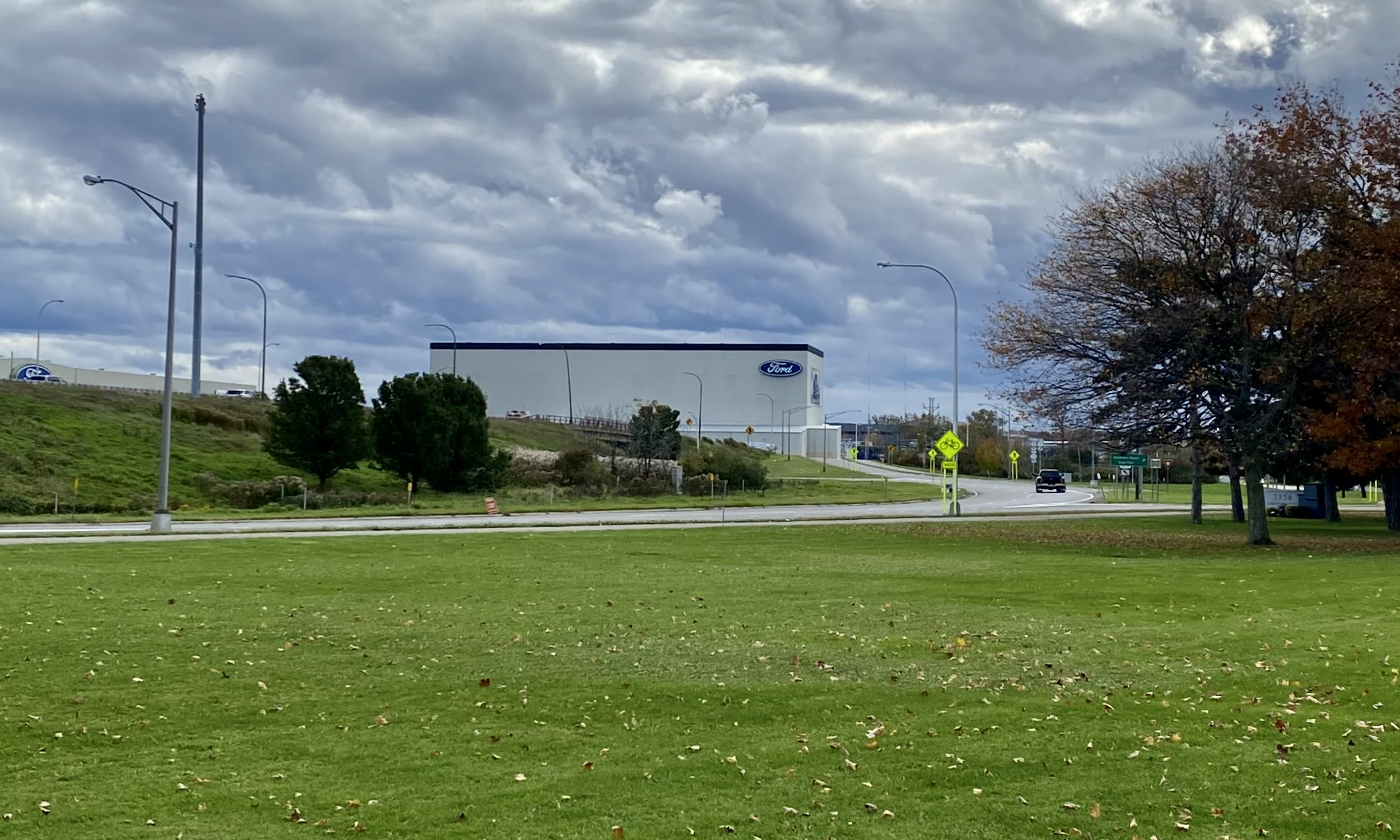
As seen in November 2021 from near the entrance to Woodlawn Beach State Park.

Buffalo Stamping Plant manufactures sheetmetal stampings and welded sub-assemblies for Ford Motor Company's automotive car and truck assembly plants in the USA, Canada and Mexico. The facility was opened in 1950 with 1,235,895 square feet (114,818.4 m^{2}) of working floor space. It has had six major expansions and the facility is now at 2,452,883 square feet (227,880.3 m^{2}) or 53.3 acres (216,000 m^{2}) of floor space. Buffalo Stamping is currently in the process of adding 30,000 square feet on to the structure.

The plant is located on an 88-acre (360,000 m^{2}) site at the Eastern end of Lake Erie near the city of Buffalo, New York. The facility processes over 1,700 tons of steel each day and ships an average of 100 rail cars of parts manufactured daily. During the year, over 425,000 tons of steel are received for manufacturing at the facility. The facility has 20 major press stamping lines that include several transfer presses which include some of the world's largest. One of those large transfer presses is the Schuler. This press is 162 feet (49 m) long, 49 feet (15 m) high from the basement to the top of the crown and weights in excess of 7,000,000 pounds.

Buffalo Stamping supplies components to two Ford Motor Company assembly plants: Oakville Assembly in Ontario, which assembles the Ford Edge and Lincoln Nautilus; and Kentucky Truck Plant, which produces the Ford Expedition, Lincoln Navigator, and Ford Super Duty trucks.

The facility supplies a total of 15 facilities, including Ford assembly plants and Ford part distribution depots. The facility recently received a recommendation for endorsement to the International ISO 14001 Standard for Environmental Management Systems.

Buffalo Stamping Plant is the first major stamping facility in North America to receive this endorsement. Buffalo Stamping is also certified to ISO 9001 International Standard for Quality since 1996.
