= Michael Printup =

American motorsport executive (1965–2025)

Michael Printup (1965 – 2025) was an American motorsport executive that served as the President of Watkins Glen International from 2009 until 2023 and the Chief Operating Officer of Racing America.

== Career ==
Printup joined the International Speedway Corporation in 2000. Prior to joining Watkins Glen, he worked in facility operations for the Michigan International Speedway. Printup served as the President for Americrown, an ISC subsidiary that operated at twelve NASCAR tracks. He also played a role in the food service contract between NASCAR and Levy Restaurants.

In 2009, Printup became the President of Watkins Glen International, a motorsport venue that has held races for the NASCAR Cup Series, IndyCar, Formula One, and the WeatherTech SportsCar Championship. In this role, he oversaw design changes to the circuit, the track's reopening following restrictions caused by the COVID-19 pandemic, and expanding the overall impact of the track. He accompanied New York Governor Andrew Cuomo during his visit to the track in 2013.

He departed from Watkins Glen in 2023 to join Parella Motorsports Holdings (later rebranded as Racing America) as the President of the Sportscar Vintage Racing Association. He was promoted to Chief Operating Officer in January 2024, overseeing all of the organization's racing operations including SVRA and the Trans-Am Series.

== Personal life and death ==
Printup was born in Hamburg, New York and studied mathematics at the State University of New York at Fredonia. He was married and had two children. His death was announced on January 1st, 2026, aged 60.
