= Big Tree, New York =

Hamlet in New York, United States

Coordinates: 42°46′11″N 78°48′41″W

Big Tree is a hamlet in the town of Hamburg in Erie County, New York, United States.
