= Woodlawn, Erie County, New York =

Hamlet in New York, United States

Coordinates: 42°47′52″N 78°50′48″W

Woodlawn is a hamlet in the town of Hamburg in Erie County, New York, United States.
