= Woodlawn Beach State Park =

State park in Erie County, New York

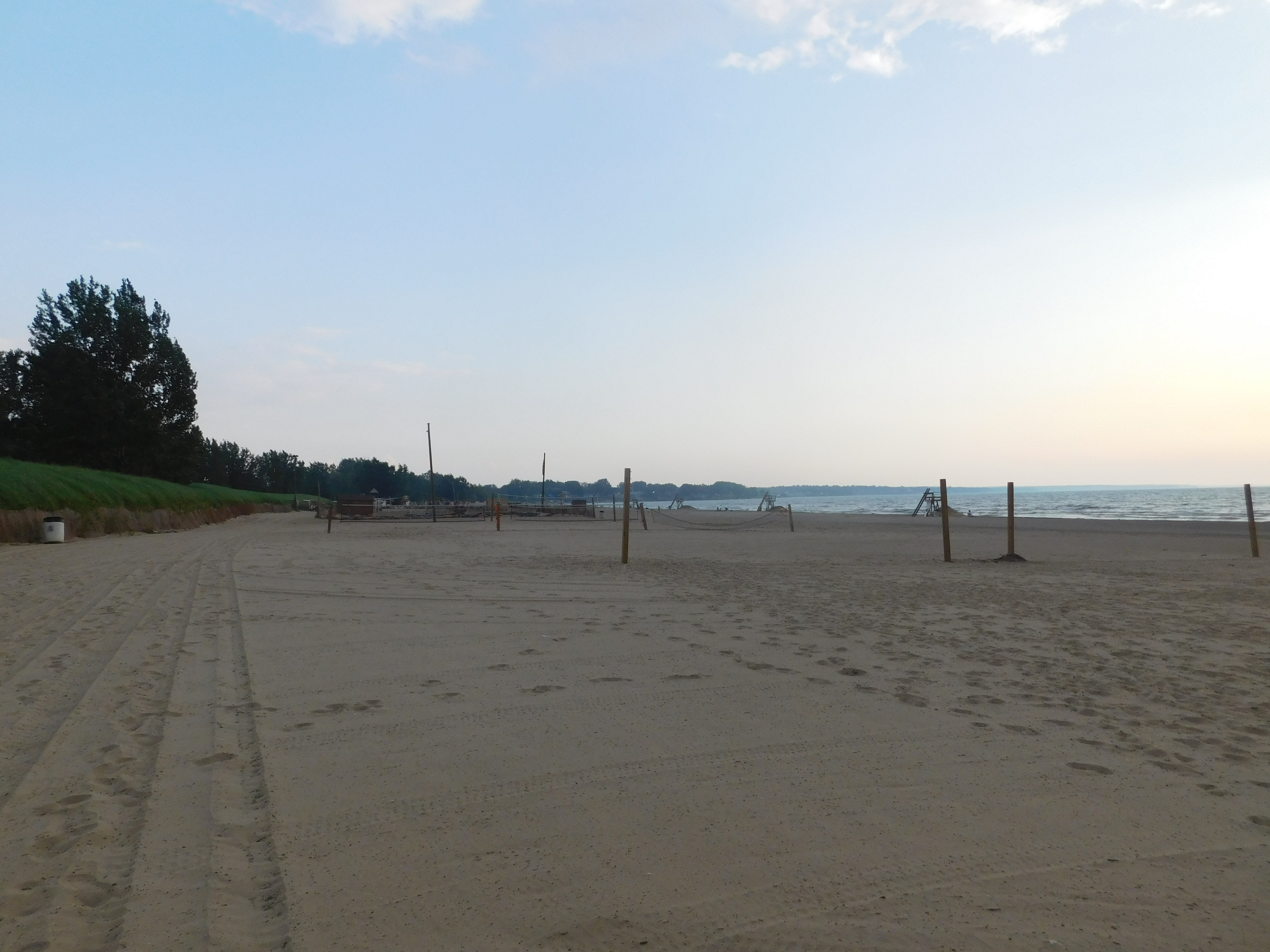
- Woodlawn Beach State Park, August 2017

- Location within New York
- Type: State park
- Location: S-3580 Lakeshore Road; Blasdell, New York
- Nearest city: Buffalo
- Coordinates: 42°47′25″N 78°51′01″W
- Area: 107 acres (0.43 km^{2})
- Created: 1996
- Operator: New York State Office of Parks, Recreation and Historic Preservation
- Visitors: 146,000 (in 2014)
- Open: All year
- Website: https://parks.ny.gov/parks/woodlawnbeach/details.aspx

Woodlawn Beach State Park is a 107-acre (0.43 km^{2}) park located near the Village of Blasdell on the eastern shore of Lake Erie in Erie County, New York. It was opened as a state park in 1996 by the New York State Office of Parks, Recreation and Historic Preservation.

== History ==
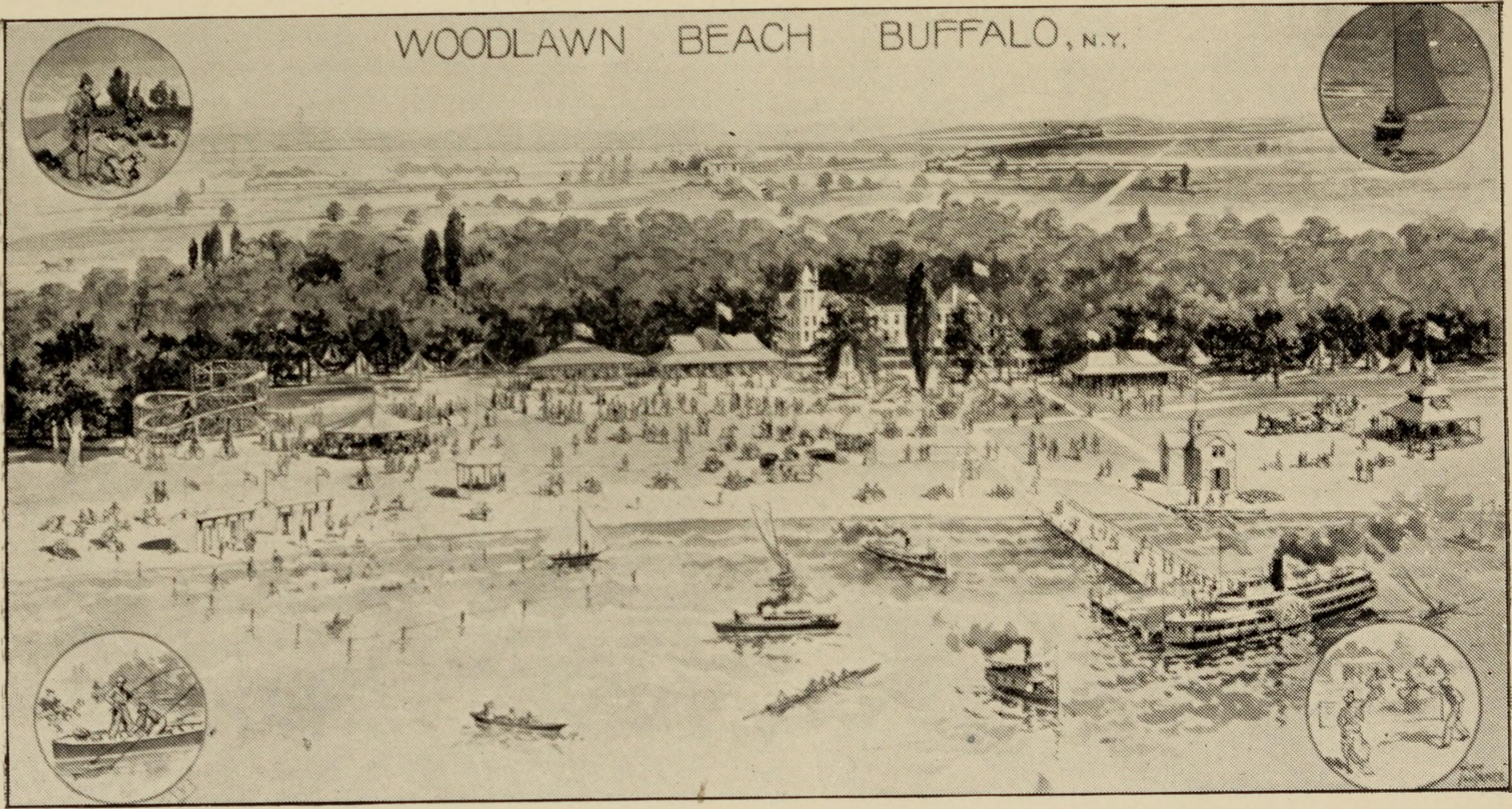
View of Woodlawn Beach in 1896.

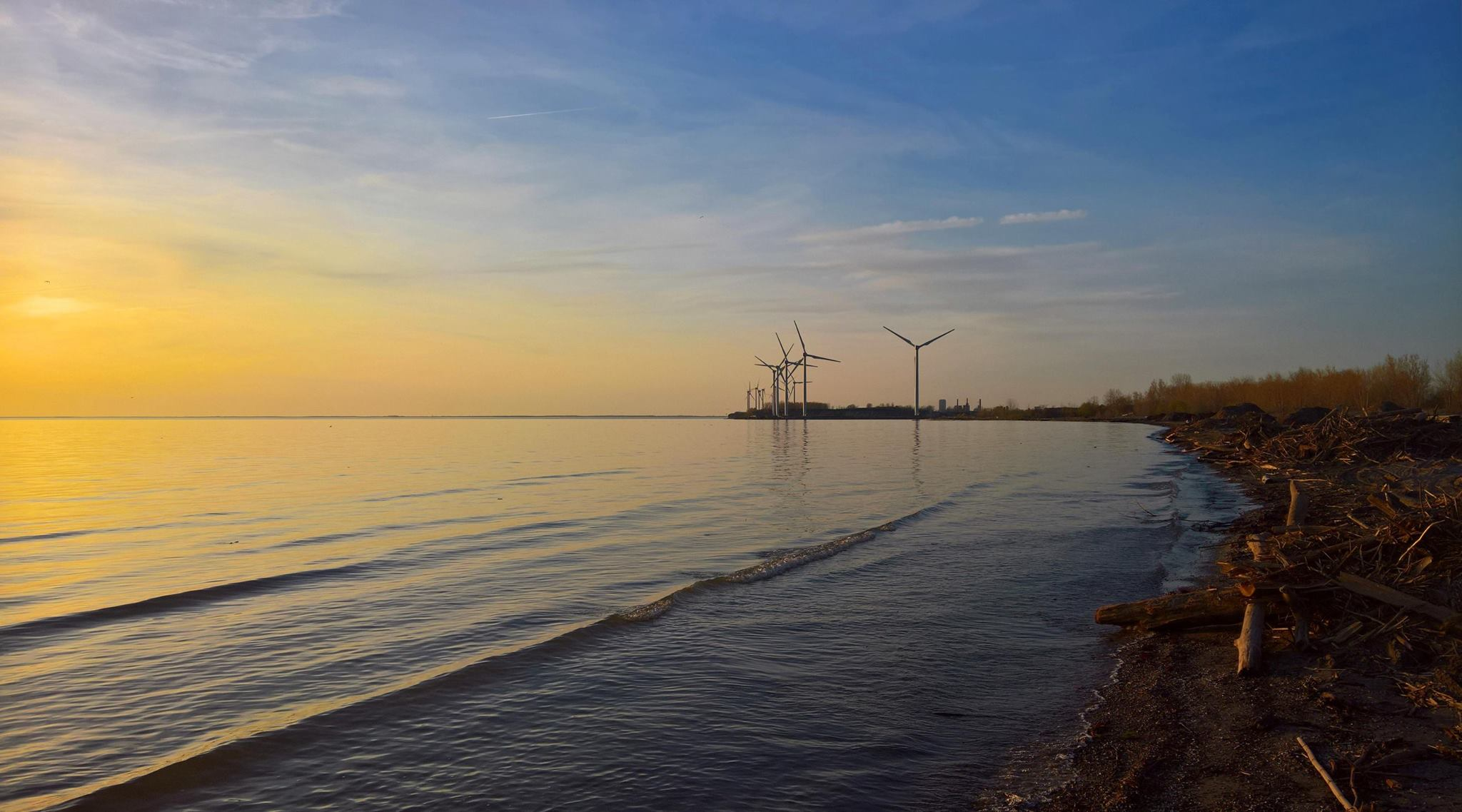
View of Woodlawn Beach in 2017.

Woodlawn Beach was historically a popular swimming location and resort during the late 19th and early 20th centuries. Served by several trains and steamships, Woodlawn Beach at this time featured a hotel, restaurant, dancing hall, bowling alley, billiards hall, toboggan slide and a 30-acre (0.12 km^{2}) picnic grove.

Access to the beach was restricted after the 1950s, when new owners disallowed public use of the land. The beach was once again opened to the public after New York State purchased 93 acres (38 ha) of property from Buffalo Crushed Stone in 1996. The $6.3 million acquisition was made with the assistance of the Trust for Public Land.

The park was operated by the New York State Office of Parks, Recreation and Historic Preservation prior to 2011. However, after a period of closure due to state budget constraints, since 2011 the park has been operated by the Town of Hamburg through a ten-year partnership agreement with New York State. Although still struggling to cover expenses, the town has had some success by marketing the park's features, such as its beach, restaurant and banquet facilities. Losses had continued to decrease in the years that the town took over park operations.

The "2010 Woodlawn Beach Sanitary Survey Report" completed by the New York State Office of Parks, Recreation, and Historic Preservation notes several potential bacteria sources which may affect the beach, including sewage overflows, stormwater outfalls, urban runoff, contaminated stream drainage, algae and leafy debris. Woodlawn Beach was identified by the Natural Resources Defense Council as the third most polluted swimming beach in New York State after failing 32% of water sample tests in 2011.

== Facilities ==
The park offers a beach, hiking, playground, picnic areas and a bar and restaurant. The park is available for parties and weddings. The Lodge is available by rental only.

The park is open for day use all year, but swimming is permitted only during summer months. The beach is open from dawn until dusk seven days a week beginning Memorial Day weekend and closes Labor Day weekend. There is a $7 parking fee. Active military (with ID) are discounted to $5 as well as motorcycles. Monday through Friday, senior citizens (62 years and older) may enter the park free of charge.

Pets are not permitted on the beach or in bathing areas. This is a statewide rule for all New York State operated parks. As of the summer of 2021, there is no alcohol permitted on the beach or in the parking lot.

The park accepts Empire Passes and Access Passes issued by New York State.

== See also ==
- List of New York state parks
