= Orchard Park Central School District =

School district in the U.S. state of New York

Location
- Orchard Park, New York
- Coordinates: 42.810284°N 78.719428°W

District information
- Type: Public
- Motto: "We will give our children the vision to reach for the stars, the skills and fortitude to climb the ladder, and the wisdom to appreciate the beauty of the journey."
- Grades: Pre-K-12
- Superintendent: David Lilleck
- Budget: $83,640,108 (2012-2013)

Other information
- Website: http://www.opschools.org/

Orchard Park Central School District is a public school district that serves Orchard Park, New York. The school district consists of 5,157 students in grades K-12 (four K-5 elementary schools, one 6-8 middle school, and one 9-12 high school). The district superintendent is David Lilleck.

Orchard Park Schools have been recognized by the National Blue Ribbon Schools Program. The Eggert Elementary School in 2007, the South Davis Elementary School in 2013 and the Orchard Park High School in 2016.

== District ==
Orchard Park's District Offices are located at 2240 Southwestern Boulevard in West Seneca, New York. The current superintendent is David Lilleck.

== Schools ==
Orchard Park High School is located at 4040 Baker Road and serves Grades 9-12. The principal is Alexis Langheier. It was built in 1960 as a Junior High school and became the high school in 1976.

Orchard Park Middle School is located at 60 South Lincoln Avenue and serves Grades 6-8. The principal is Mary Kate Graham. It was built in 1948 (cornerstone laid on September 19, 1948) and opened on September 7, 1949 as the Junior-Senior High School. It was dedicated on November 29, 1949 and became Orchard Park Middle School in 1976.

Eggert Elementary School is located at 3580 Eggert Road and serves Grades K-5. The principal is Terence Tryon. It opened on September 8, 1965 and was dedicated on May 22, 1966.

Ellicott Elementary School is located at 5180 Ellicott Road and serves Grades K-5. The principal is Paul Pietrantone. It opened in 1968 and was dedicated on December 8, 1968.

South Davis Elementary School is located at 51 South Davis Street and serves Grades K-5. It was built in 1952, and the principal is Jeffrey Dolce.

Windom Elementary School is located at 3870 Sheldon Avenue and serves Grades K-5. The principal is Theresa Glowacki. It opened in 1957 and was dedicated on November 3, 1957.
