= Hamburg Central School District =

New York State public school district

Address
- 5305 Abbott Road Hamburg, New York, 14075; United States

District information
- Type: Public school district
- Motto: Inspiring today. Empowering Tomorrow.
- Grades: Pre-K-12
- Superintendent: Thomas E. Adams
- Schools: 6

Students and staff
- District mascot: Bulldogs
- Colors

Other information
- Website: hamburgschools.org

Hamburg Central School District is a New York State public school district that serves the village of Hamburg of Erie County. It operates one high school, one middle school, and four elementary schools.

== Administration ==
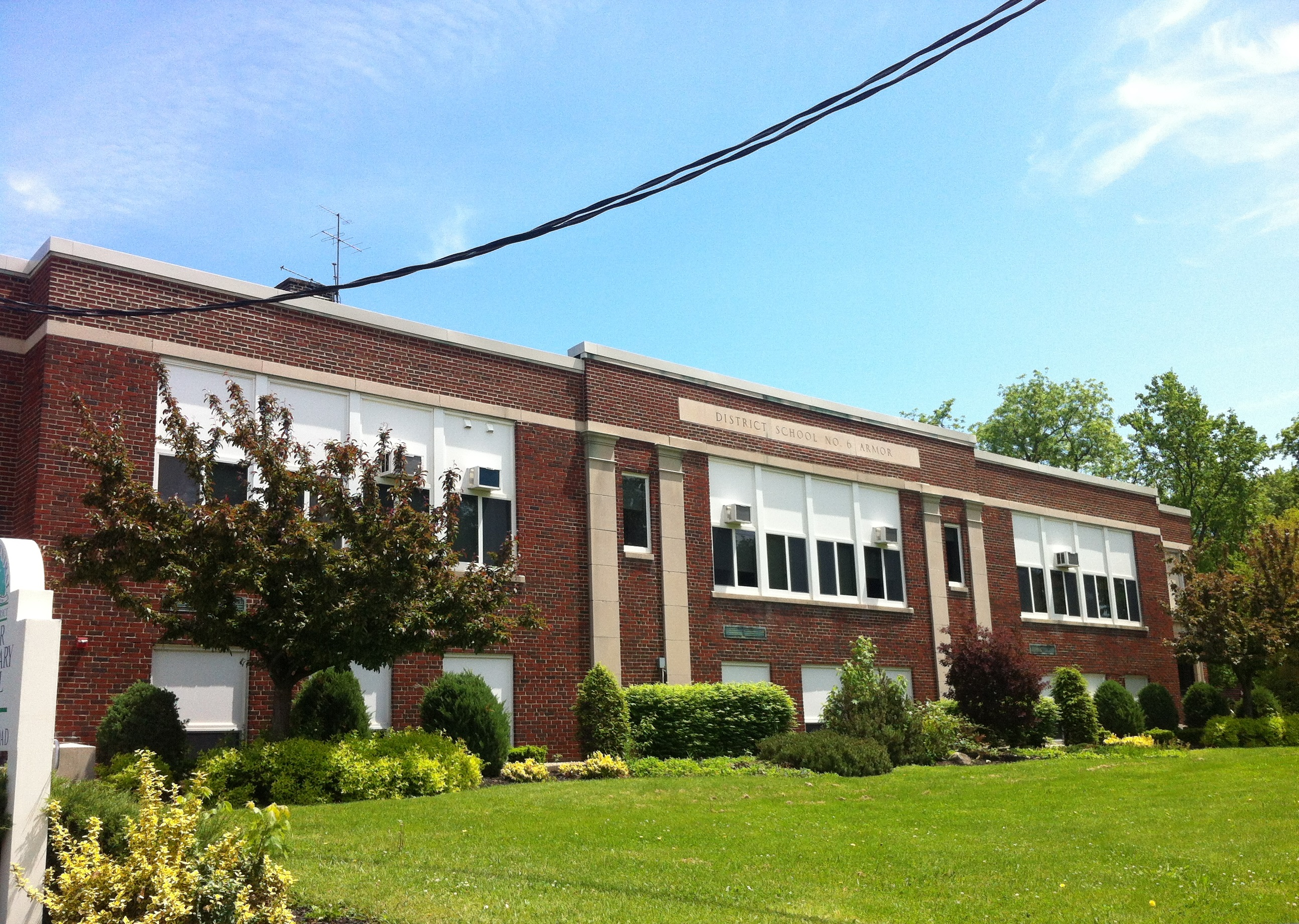
Old School No. 6, home of Hamburg's district offices.

The District offices are located at 5305 Abbott Road in Hamburg. The current Superintendent is Thomas Adams, who has served since 2025.

=== Former Superintendents ===
Previous assignment and reason for departure denoted in parentheses

- Glenn C. Harris
- Ford R. Park
- Frederick Moffit
- Harry H. Hatten–1957-1971
- Lewis A. Grell
- Donald J. Ogilvie–1989-1997 (Superintendent - Southwestern Central School District, named Superintendent of Erie 1 BOCES)
- Peter G. Roswell–1997-2007 (Superintendent - Holland Central School District, retired)
- Gordon Kerr [interim]–2007 (Assistant Superintendent - Hamburg Central School District, returned to position)
- Mark J. Crawford–2007-2010 (Superintendent - Dryden Central School District, named Superintendent of West Seneca Central School District)
- Steven A. Achramovitch–2010-2013 (Superintendent - Greece Central School District, retired)
- Richard Jetter–2013-2014 (Assistant Superintendent for Technology - Hamburg Central School District, resigned)
- Vincent J. Coppola [acting]–2014-2015 (Search Consultant - Western New York Educational Service Council, successor appointed)
- Michael R. Cornell–2015-2024 (Principal - Amherst Middle School, retired)

== Hamburg High School ==
Hamburg High School
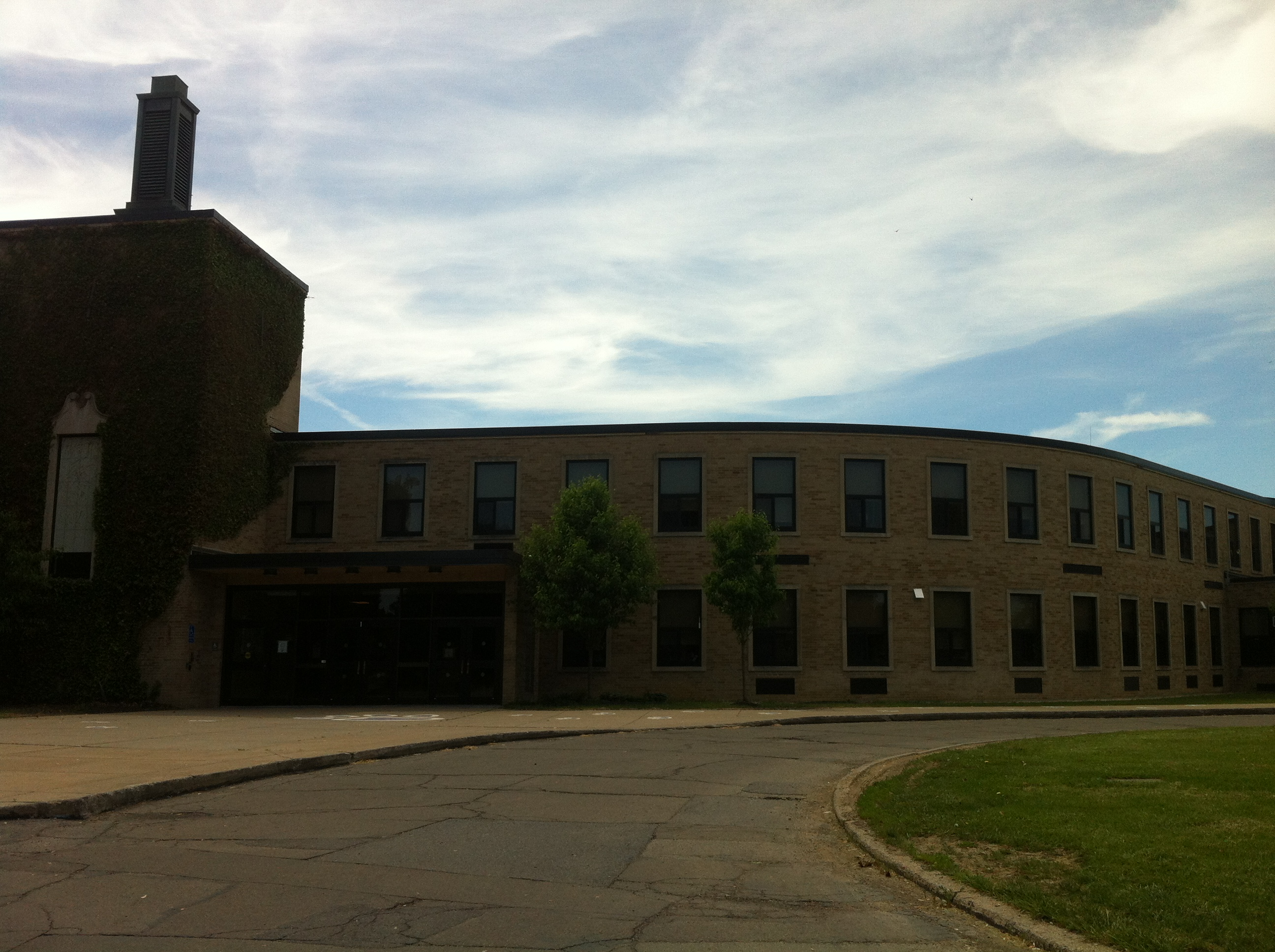

Location
- 4111 Legion Drive; Hamburg, Erie, New York 14075; United States

Information
- Principal: John J. Crangle III
- Grades: 9-12
- Colors: Purple and White
- Mascot: Bulldog
- Newspaper: Purple Underground
- Yearbook: Echoes
- Website: Hamburg High School

Hamburg High School is located at 4111 Legion Road and serves grades 9–12. The principal is John Crangle.

Hamburg High School opened on September 7, 1955, and was dedicated on November 6, 1955. A 1997 8-classroom addition created a new wing on the south side of the building.

== Hamburg Middle School ==
Hamburg Middle School
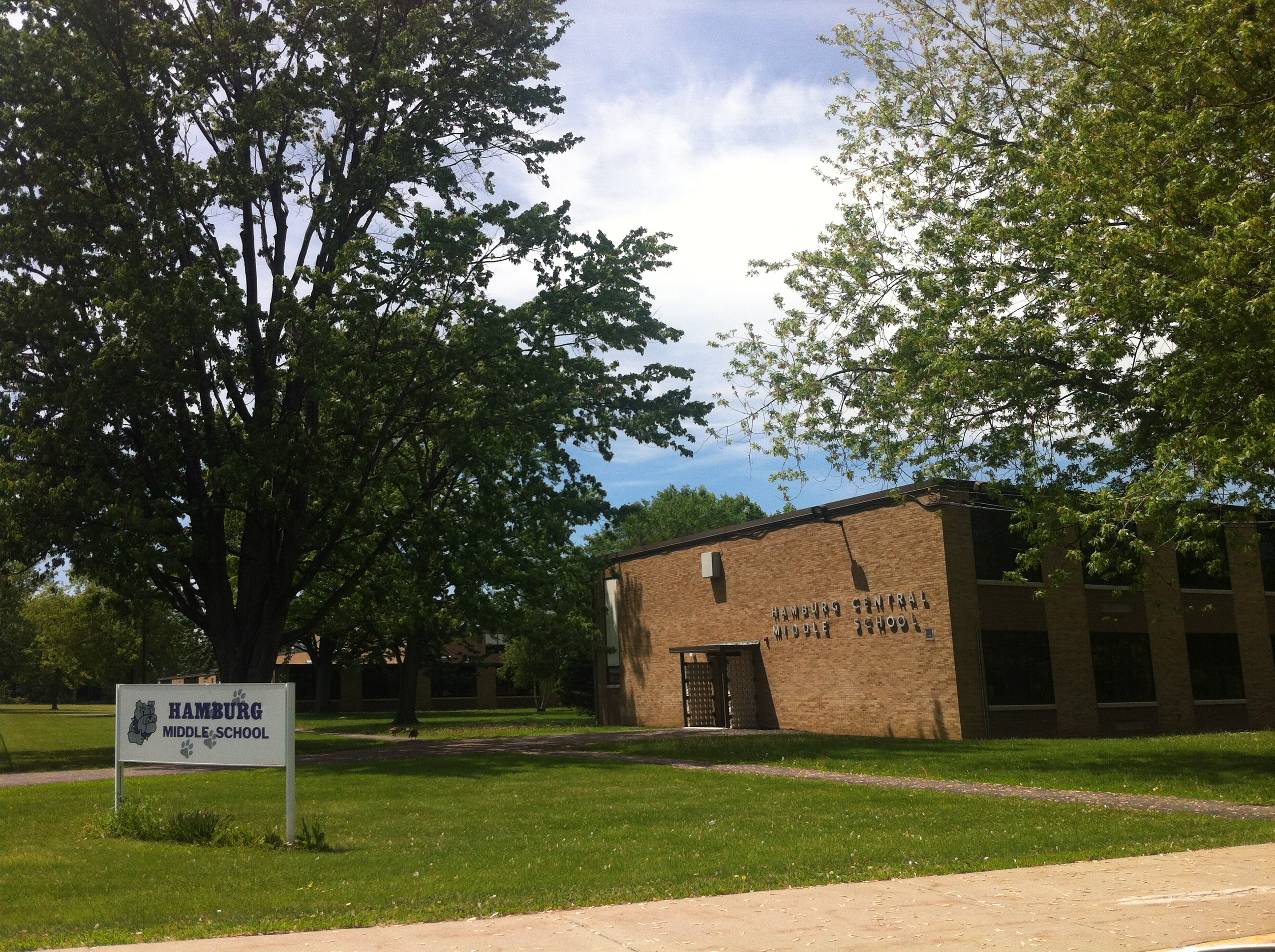

Location
- 360 Division Street; Hamburg, Erie, New York 14075

Information
- Principal: Matt Lauer
- Grades: 6-8
- Website: Hamburg Middle School

Hamburg Middle School is located at 360 Division Street and serves grades 6 through 8. The principal is Matt Lauer.

Hamburg Middle School was built in 1963 as Hamburg Junior High School. The school opened on September 9, 1964, and was dedicated on January 28, 1965.

== Armor Elementary School ==
Armor Elementary School
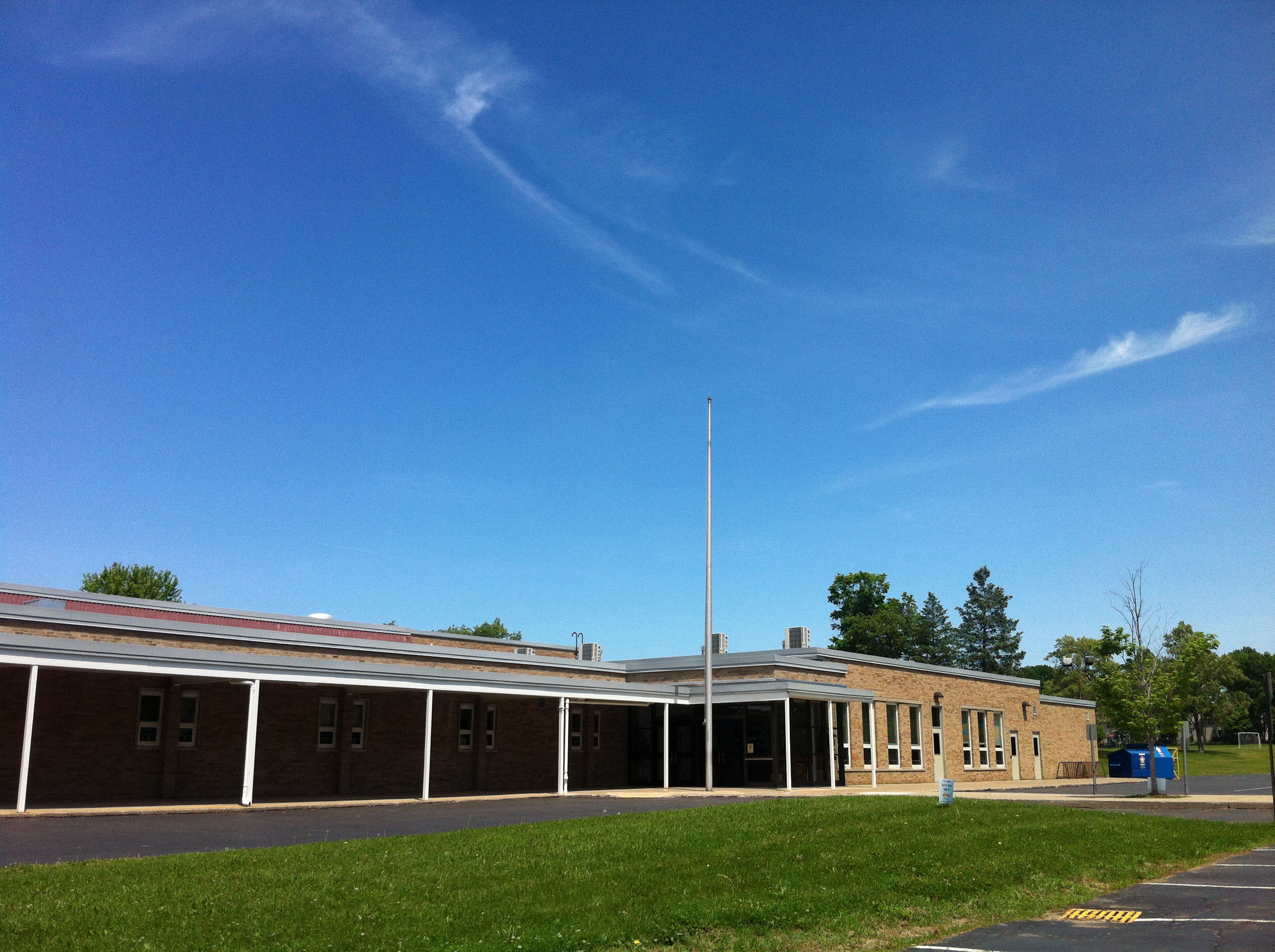

Location
- 5301 Abbott Road; Hamburg, Erie, New York 14275

Information
- Principal: Thomas Riddoch
- Grades: K-5
- Website: Armor Elementary School

Armor Elementary School is located at 5301 Abbott Road and serves grades K through 5. The principal is Thomas Riddoch.

Armor Elementary was built and opened on March 17, 1970, as a single-floor brick building. The cornerstone was laid at the dedication ceremony on October 29, 1970. It was renovated in 1997 to include eight additional classrooms, a new main office, and improved special classrooms.

== Boston Valley Elementary School ==
Boston Valley Elementary School
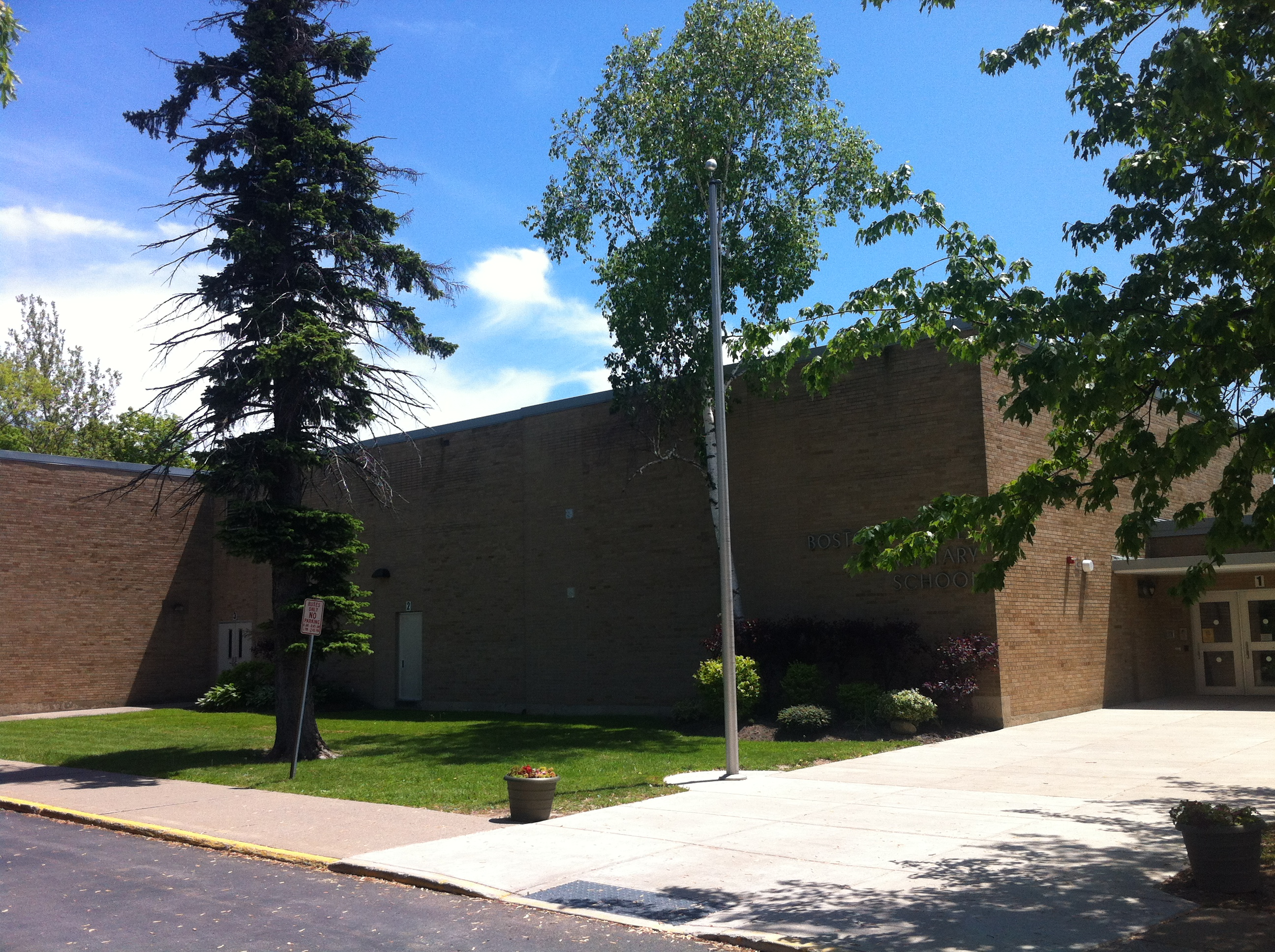

Location
- 7476 Back Creek Road; Hamburg, Erie, New York 14275

Information
- Principal: Nicole C. Lauer
- Grades: K-5
- Website: Boston Valley School

Boston Valley Elementary School is located at 7476 Back Creek Road and serves Grades K through 5. The principal is Nicole Lauer.

Boston Valley Elementary School opened in September 1959 and was dedicated on May 15, 1960.

== Charlotte Avenue Elementary School ==
Charlotte Avenue Elementary School
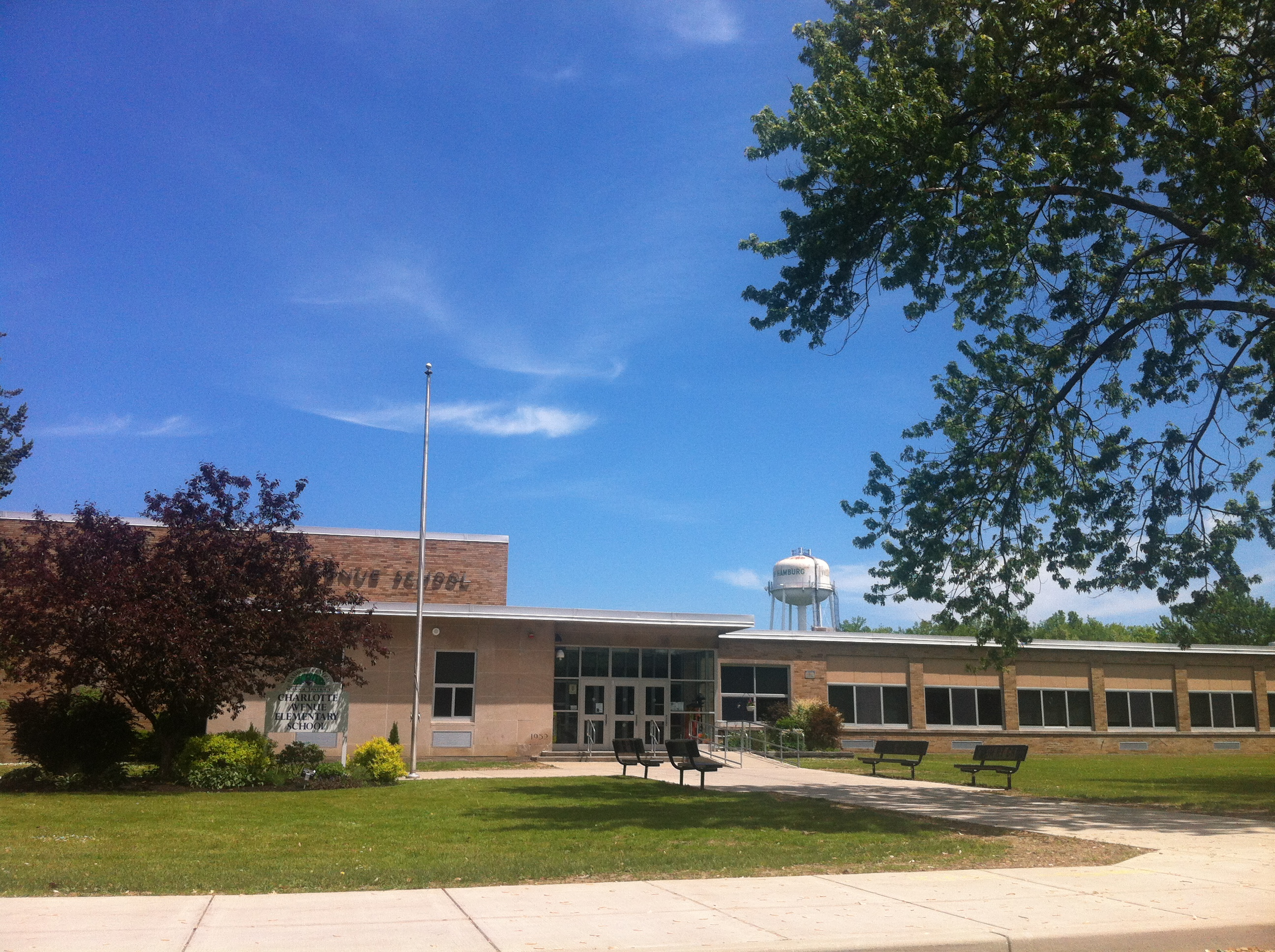

Location
- 301 Charlotte Avenue; Hamburg, Erie, New York 14075

Information
- Principal: Danielle M. Lango
- Grades: K-5
- Website: Charlotte Avenue School

Charlotte Avenue Elementary School is located at 301 Charlotte Avenue and serves grades K through 5. The principal is Danielle Lango.

Charlotte Avenue Elementary was built in 1952 and opened on January 26, 1953.

== Union Pleasant Elementary School ==
Union Pleasant Elementary School
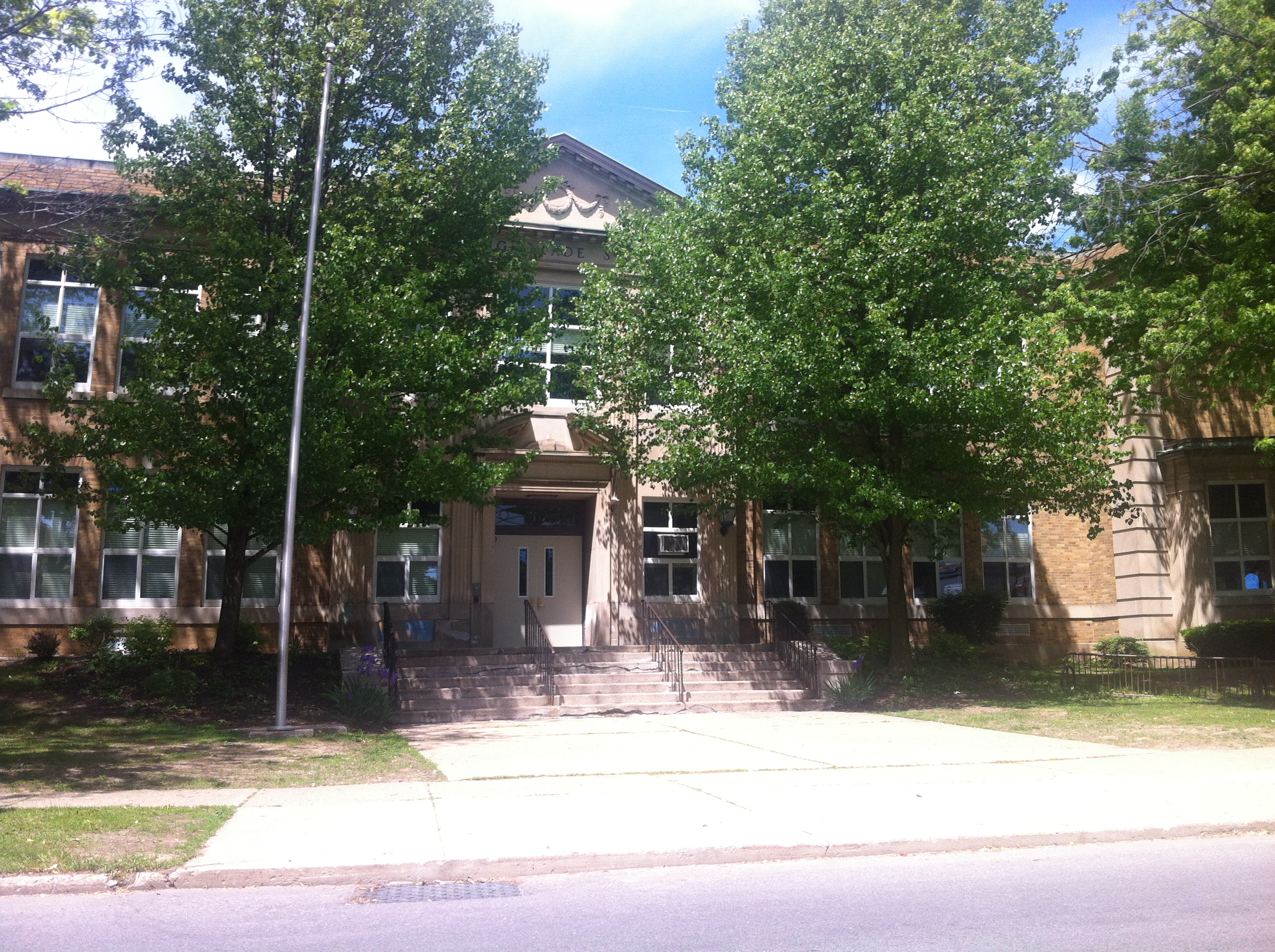

Location
- 150 Pleasant Avenue; Hamburg, Erie, New York 14075

Information
- Principal: Molly Wallschlaeger
- Grades: K-5
- Website: Union Pleasant School

Union Pleasant Elementary School is located at 150 Pleasant Avenue and serves grades K through 5. The principal is Molly Wallschlaeger.

Union Pleasant Elementary was built in 1924 and was dedicated on November 10, 1925, as the original Hamburg High School. The new Hamburg High School on Legion Drive opened on September 7, 1955, and Union Pleasant Elementary School took the place of the original high school.
