= 2014 New York Jets season =

2014 season of the New York Jets NFL franchise

- Owner: Woody and Christopher Johnson
- General manager: John Idzik
- Head coach: Rex Ryan
- Home stadium: MetLife Stadium

Results
- Record: 4–12
- Division place: 4th AFC East
- Playoffs: Did not qualify
- Pro Bowlers: C Nick Mangold; DE Sheldon Richardson

Uniform
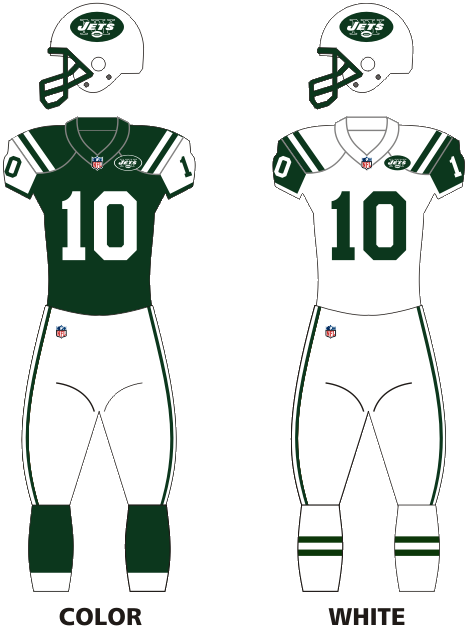

The 2014 season was the New York Jets' 45th in the National Football League (NFL) and their 55th overall. The Jets failed to improve on their 8–8 regular season record in 2013. They were eliminated from postseason contention for the fourth consecutive season after a Week 12 loss to the Buffalo Bills. As a result, head coach Rex Ryan, along with most of his staff, and general manager John Idzik, Jr. were fired after the season. Ryan compiled a 46–50 record in six seasons as head coach, and would later go on to become head coach of the rival Bills.

This was the first season since 2005 that the team finished last in the division.

== Transactions ==
=== Coaching and personnel changes ===
- Linebackers coach Brian VanGorder was hired as Notre Dame's defensive coordinator. Defensive quality control coach Bobby April III was promoted to replace VanGorder.
- Special teams coach Ben Kotwica was hired by the Washington Redskins for the same position. He was replaced by former LSU special teams coach Thomas McGaughey.
- The Jets promoted Tony Sparano Jr. to offensive assistant and hired former player Eric Smith as a seasonal intern.
- The Jets hired Aaron McLaurin as an assistant strength and conditioning coach and Kavan Latham as a strength and conditioning intern.

=== Arrivals ===
- The Jets signed Colin Anderson, T. J. Barnes, Tevita Finau, Michael Campbell, Dwight Jones, Dalton Freeman, Tim Fugger, and Rontez Miles to reserve/future contracts on December 31, 2013.
- The Jets signed Ras-I Dowling to a reserve/future contract on January 6, 2014.
- The Jets signed Patrick Ford and Lowell Rose to reserve/future contracts on January 8, 2014.
- The Jets signed Jacolby Ashworth and Nick Taylor to reserve/future contracts on January 14, 2014.
- The Jets signed Brandon Hardin to a reserve/future contract on January 15, 2014.
- The Jets signed Johnny Patrick off waivers on March 5, 2014.
- The Jets signed Breno Giacomini and Eric Decker on March 12, 2014.
- The Jets signed Michael Vick on March 21, 2014.
- The Jets signed Jeremy Reeves on March 28, 2014.
- The Jets signed Jacoby Ford and Dimitri Patterson on April 1, 2014.
- The Jets signed Chris Johnson on April 16, 2014.
- The Jets signed undrafted free agents Tevon Conrad, Steele Divitto, Anthony Grady, Kerry Hyder, Terrence Miller, Brent Qvale, Zach Thompson, and Chad Young on May 11, 2014.
- The Jets claimed Daryl Richardson off waivers on May 16, 2014.
- The Jets signed A. J. Edds and Markus Zusevics on May 19, 2014.
- The Jets signed Andrew Furney and Jacob Schum on June 19, 2014.
- The Jets signed Jason Babin on July 23, 2014.
- The Jets signed Michael Smith on August 1, 2014.
- The Jets signed Bruce Campbell on August 5, 2014.
- The Jets signed LeQuan Lewis on August 12, 2014.
- The Jets claimed Leon McFadden off waivers on August 31, 2014.
- The Jets signed Matt Simms, Daryl Richardson, Chris Pantale, Brent Qvale, Tevita Finau, Kerry Hyder, and Rontez Miles to the practice squad on August 31, 2014.
- The Jets signed Phillip Adams and A. J. Edds, claimed Walt Powell off waivers and signed LeQuan Lewis to the practice squad on September 1, 2014.
- The Jets signed Quincy Enunwa and Jeremiah George to the practice squad on September 2, 2014.
- The Jets re-signed Ellis Lankster on September 12, 2013.
- The Jets signed Brandon Smith to the practice squad on September 23, 2014.
- The Jets signed Marcus Williams to the practice squad on September 24, 2014.
- The Jets signed T. J. Graham and Chris Owusu on September 29, 2014.
- The Jets signed John Conner to the active roster and LeQuan Lewis to the practice squad on September 30, 2014.
- The Jets signed DaShaun Phillips to the practice squad on October 7, 2014.
- The Jets signed Josh Thomas and Wesley Johnson on October 13, 2014.
- The Jets signed Chris Young to the practice squad on October 29, 2014.
- The Jets signed Chris Owusu to the practice squad on November 3, 2014.
- The Jets signed Kona Schwenke to the practice squad on December 3, 2014.
- The Jets signed Keith Lewis to the practice squad on December 9, 2014.
- The Jets signed Mario Harvey to the practice squad on December 16, 2014.

=== Departures ===
- The Jets released Antonio Cromartie on March 9, 2014.
- The Jets released Santonio Holmes on March 10, 2014.
- The Jets released Mark Sanchez on March 21, 2014.
- The Jets released Tevon Conrad on May 16, 2014.
- The Jets released Dwight Jones and Jacolby Ashworth on May 19, 2014.
- The Jets released Mike Goodson on June 18, 2014.
- The Jets released Terrence Miller on June 19, 2014.
- The Jets released Lowell Rose on July 23, 2014.
- The Jets released Brandon Hardin on August 1, 2014.
- The Jets released Tim Fugger on August 12, 2014.
- The Jets released Michael Smith, Bruce Campbell, Patrick Ford, Markus Zusevics, Steele Divitto, Andrew Furney, and Jake Schum on August 23, 2014.
- The Jets released Jacoby Ford, Michael Campbell, Colin Anderson, Chad Young, Anthony Grady, and Ras-I Dowling.
- The Jets released Tajh Boyd, Matt Simms, Alex Green, Daryl Richardson, Clyde Gates, Stephen Hill, Chris Pantale, William Campbell, Brent Qvale, Caleb Schlauderaff, Tevita Finau, Kerry Hyder, Zach Thompson, Troy Davis, A. J. Edds, Garrett McIntyre, Brandon Dixon, Rontez Miles, Johnny Patrick, Dimitri Patterson and Jeremy Reeves on August 30, 2014.
- The Jets released LeQuan Lewis on August 31, 2014.
- The Jets released Quincy Enunwa, Jeremiah George, and Ellis Lankster on September 1, 2014.
- The Jets released Leon McFadden on September 11, 2014.
- The Jets released Ellis Lankster on September 23, 2014.
- The Jets released Jalen Saunders and LeQuan Lewis on September 29, 2014.
- The Jets released Brandon Smith from the practice squad on September 30, 2014.
- The Jets released LeQuan Lewis from the practice squad on October 7, 2014.
- The Jets released Josh Bush on October 15, 2014.
- The Jets released David Nelson on October 17, 2014.
- The Jets released A. J. Edds on October 28, 2014.
- The Jets released Chris Owusu on November 1, 2014.
- The Jets released Antwan Barnes on December 1, 2014.
- The Jets released Josh Thomas on December 16, 2014.

=== Trades ===
==== To Jets ====
- Percy Harvin was traded from the Seattle Seahawks to the Jets on October 17, 2014, in exchange for a conditional draft pick from New York in the 2015 NFL draft.

=== Free Agents ===
Position	Player	Free agency tag	Date signed/released	2014 team	Notes
LB	Nick Bellore	RFA	March 10, 2014	New York Jets	
CB	Aaron Berry	UFA	June 2, 2014	Cleveland Browns	
G	Willie Colon	UFA	March 19, 2014	New York Jets	
WR	Josh Cribbs	UFA	–	–	–
TE	Jeff Cumberland	UFA	March 7, 2014	New York Jets	
LB	Jermaine Cunningham	UFA	January 13, 2014	New York Jets	
DE	Leger Douzable	UFA	March 12, 2014	New York Jets	
G	Vladimir Ducasse	UFA	March 24, 2014	Minnesota Vikings	
PK	Nick Folk	UFA	February 28, 2014	New York Jets	
QB	David Garrard	UFA	–	–	–
RB	John Griffin	ERFA	–	–	–
WR	Vidal Hazelton	ERFA	–	–	–
FB	Lex Hilliard	UFA	–	–	–
T	Austin Howard	UFA	March 12, 2014	Oakland Raiders	
CB	Ellis Lankster	UFA	March 5, 2014	New York Jets	
LB	Josh Mauga	UFA	July 24, 2014	Kansas City Chiefs	
LB	Garrett McIntyre	RFA	April 9, 2014	New York Jets	
LB	Calvin Pace	UFA	March 16, 2014	New York Jets	
S	Ed Reed	UFA	–	–	–
TE	Konrad Reuland	ERFA	–	–	–
RB	Darius Reynaud	UFA	–	–	–
QB	Matt Simms	ERFA	January 13, 2014	New York Jets	
CB	Isaiah Trufant	RFA	March 12, 2014	Cleveland Browns	
CB	Darrin Walls	RFA	March 5, 2014	New York Jets	
TE	Kellen Winslow II	UFA	–	–	–

RFA: Restricted free agent, UFA: Unrestricted free agent, ERFA: Exclusive rights free agent, FT: Franchise tag

=== Draft ===
2014 New York Jets draft
Round	Pick	Player	Position	College	Notes
1	18	Calvin Pryor	S	Louisville	
2	49	Jace Amaro	TE	Texas Tech	
3	80	Dexter McDougle	CB	Maryland	
4	104	Jalen Saunders	WR	Oklahoma	Pick from TB
4	115	Shaquelle Evans	WR	UCLA	
4	137	Dakota Dozier	OT	Furman	Compensatory
5	154	Jeremiah George	LB	Iowa St	
6	195	Brandon Dixon	CB	Northwest Missouri St	
6	209	Quincy Enunwa	WR	Nebraska	Compensatory
6	210	Ikemefuna Enemkpali	DE	Louisiana Tech	Compensatory
6	213	Tajh Boyd	QB	Clemson	Compensatory
7	233	Trevor Reilly	LB	Utah	
Made roster † Pro Football Hall of Fame * Made at least one Pro Bowl during career

Draft trades

- The Jets acquired an additional fourth-round selection as part of a trade that sent cornerback Darrelle Revis to the Tampa Bay Buccaneers.
- The Jets were awarded four compensatory selections after losing free agents Yeremiah Bell, LaRon Landry, Mike DeVito, Shonn Greene, Dustin Keller, and Matt Slauson.

== Preseason ==
Week	Date	Opponent	Result	Record	Venue	Recap
1	August 7	Indianapolis Colts	W 13–10	1–0	MetLife Stadium	Recap
2	August 16	at Cincinnati Bengals	W 25–17	2–0	Paul Brown Stadium	Recap
3	August 22	vs. New York Giants	L 24–35	2–1	MetLife Stadium	Recap
4	August 28	at Philadelphia Eagles	L 7–37	2–2	Lincoln Financial Field	Recap

== Regular season ==
=== Schedule ===
Week	Date	Opponent	Result	Record	Venue	Recap
1	September 7	Oakland Raiders	**W** 19–14	1–0	MetLife Stadium	Recap
2	September 14	at Green Bay Packers	**L** 24–31	1–1	Lambeau Field	Recap
3	September 22	Chicago Bears	**L** 19–27	1–2	MetLife Stadium	Recap
4	September 28	Detroit Lions	**L** 17–24	1–3	MetLife Stadium	Recap
5	October 5	at San Diego Chargers	**L** 0–31	1–4	Qualcomm Stadium	Recap
6	October 12	Denver Broncos	**L** 17–31	1–5	MetLife Stadium	Recap
7	October 16	at **New England Patriots**	**L** 25–27	1–6	Gillette Stadium	Recap
8	October 26	**Buffalo Bills**	**L** 23–43	1–7	MetLife Stadium	Recap
9	November 2	at Kansas City Chiefs	**L** 10–24	1–8	Arrowhead Stadium	Recap
10	November 9	Pittsburgh Steelers	**W** 20–13	2–8	MetLife Stadium	Recap
11	Bye					
12	November 24 (Note: The Week 12 game at the Buffalo Bills, originally scheduled at 1:00 p.m. EST on November 23 at Ralph Wilson Stadium, was rescheduled to November 24 at 7:00 p.m. EST and relocated to Ford Field in Detroit due to a lake-effect snowstorm that struck the Buffalo area.)	at **Buffalo Bills**	**L** 3–38	2–9	Ford Field	Recap
13	December 1	**Miami Dolphins**	**L** 13–16	2–10	MetLife Stadium	Recap
14	December 7	at Minnesota Vikings	**L** 24–30 (OT)	2–11	TCF Bank Stadium	Recap
15	December 14	at Tennessee Titans	**W** 16–11	3–11	LP Field	Recap
16	December 21	**New England Patriots**	**L** 16–17	3–12	MetLife Stadium	Recap
17	December 28	at **Miami Dolphins**	**W** 37–24	4–12	Sun Life Stadium	Recap

Note: Intra-division opponents are in bold text.

=== Game summaries ===
==== Week 1: vs. Oakland Raiders ====
Week 1: Oakland Raiders at New York Jets – Game summary

Quarter	1	2	3	4	Total
Raiders	7	0	0	7	**14**
**Jets**	3	7	3	6	**19**

at MetLife Stadium, East Rutherford, New Jersey

- Date: September 7
- Game time: 1:00 p.m. EDT
- Game weather: Sunny, 76 °F (24 °C)
- Game attendance: 78,160
- Referee: Craig Wrolstad
- TV announcers (CBS): Jim Nantz, Phil Simms and Tracy Wolfson
- Recap, Gamebook

Game information

**First quarter**

- NYJ – Nick Folk 45-yard field goal, 9:20. Jets 3–0. **Drive: 10 plays, 33 yards, 5:44.**
- OAK – Rod Streater 12-yard pass from Derek Carr (Sebastian Janikowski kick), 2:48. Raiders 7–3. **Drive: 6 plays, 28 yards, 3:17.**

**Second quarter**

- NYJ – Chris Johnson 5-yard pass from Geno Smith (Nick Folk kick), 0:31. Jets 10–7. **Drive: 12 plays, 80 yards, 4:01.**

**Third quarter**

- NYJ – Nick Folk 42-yard field, 2:42. Jets 13–7. **Drive: 8 plays, 28 yards, 4:46.**

**Fourth quarter**

- NYJ – Chris Ivory 71-yard run (2-point conversion failed), 8:16. Jets 19–7. **Drive: 1 play, 71 yards, 0:13.**
- OAK – James Jones 30-yard pass from Derek Carr (Sebastian Janikowski kick), 1:27. Jets 19–14. **Drive: 6 plays, 73 yards, 1:18.**

**Top passers**

- NYJ – Geno Smith – 23/28, 221 yards, TD, INT
- OAK – Derek Carr – 20/32, 151 yards, 2 TD

**Top rushers**

- NYJ – Chris Ivory – 10 rushes, 102 yards, TD
- OAK – Darren McFadden – 4 rushes, 15 yards

**Top receivers**

- NYJ – Eric Decker – 5 receptions, 74 yards
- OAK – Rod Streater – 5 receptions, 46 yards, TD

The Jets got off to a sloppy start when Raiders rookie starting QB Derek Carr torched the Jets defense early in the game to take a 7–3 lead after Charles Woodson picked off Jets 2nd year QB Geno Smith in his 17th start. However, the Jets quickly rebounded with a 5-yard shovel TD pass from Smith to Chris Johnson to take the lead 10–7 going into halftime. The Jets would never trail the rest of the game, although Carr threw a late TD pass to Raiders WR James Jones in garbage time, and attempted a failed onside kick. Chris Ivory had a solid day, rushing for 102 yards and a TD. The score came when Ivory ran 71 yards for a TD during the 4th quarter; it was the Jets' longest TD run since Thomas Jones 71-yard TD run back on October 19, 2009. Geno Smith completed a career-best 82.1% completion percentage (23/28 for 221 yards, 1 TD, 1 INT); it was the best performance delivered by a Jet quarterback since Chad Pennington completed 82.1% of his passes in a loss to the Buffalo Bills way back in 2007.

=== Week 2: at Green Bay Packers ===
Week 2: New York Jets at Green Bay Packers – Game summary

Quarter	1	2	3	4	Total
Jets	14	7	3	0	**24**
**Packers**	3	13	15	0	**31**

at Lambeau Field, Green Bay, Wisconsin

- Date: September 14
- Game time: 4:25 p.m. EDT/3:25 p.m. CDT
- Game weather: Sunny, 63 °F (17 °C)
- Game attendance: 78,041
- Referee: Walt Anderson
- TV announcers (CBS): Greg Gumbel, Trent Green and Evan Washburn
- Recap, Gamebook

After racing to a 21–3 lead in the second quarter, the Jets were outscored 28-3 for the remainder of the game. A game-tying 37-yard touchdown throw by Geno Smith to Jeremy Kerley with five minutes to go in the fourth quarter was wiped out when assistant coach Marty Mornhinweg called the Jets' final timeout just as the ball was snapped; even more egregiously Mornhinweg was not authorized to call timeouts, the responsibility of head coach Rex Ryan. The Jets failed to convert after this and fell 31–24; it marked only the second time for Packers quarterback Aaron Rodgers that he won a game despite a deficit exceeding eight points.

=== Week 3: vs. Chicago Bears ===
Week 3: Chicago Bears at New York Jets – Game summary

Quarter	1	2	3	4	Total
**Bears**	14	3	7	3	**27**
Jets	3	10	3	3	**19**

at MetLife Stadium, East Rutherford, New Jersey

- Date: September 22
- Game time: 8:30 p.m. EDT
- Game weather: Clear, 60 °F (16 °C)
- Game attendance: 78,160
- Referee: Jerome Boger
- TV announcers (ESPN): Mike Tirico, Jon Gruden and Lisa Salters
- Recap, Gamebook

=== Week 4: vs. Detroit Lions ===
Week 4: Detroit Lions at New York Jets – Game summary

Quarter	1	2	3	4	Total
**Lions**	3	14	0	7	**24**
Jets	3	0	7	7	**17**

at MetLife Stadium, East Rutherford, New Jersey

- Date: September 28
- Game time: 1:00 p.m. EDT
- Game weather: Clear, 80 °F (27 °C)
- Game attendance: 78,160
- Referee: Walt Coleman
- TV announcers (Fox): Kenny Albert, Daryl Johnston and Tony Siragusa
- Recap, Gamebook

=== Week 5: at San Diego Chargers ===
Week 5: New York Jets at San Diego Chargers – Game summary

Quarter	1	2	3	4	Total
Jets	0	0	0	0	**0**
**Chargers**	7	14	7	3	**31**

at Qualcomm Stadium, San Diego, California

- Date: October 5
- Game time: 4:25 p.m. EDT/1:25 p.m. PDT
- Game weather: Sunny, 91 °F (33 °C)
- Game attendance: 63,471
- Referee: Ron Torbert
- TV announcers (CBS): Greg Gumbel, Trent Green and Evan Washburn
- Recap, Gamebook

Geno Smith was benched in the middle of this game for Michael Vick. CBS imposed the "mercy rule" (switching to another program) towards the end of this game because of how poorly the Jets were playing. This marked the third season in a row in which a New York team was the first team to be shut out in a game.

=== Week 6: vs. Denver Broncos ===
Week 6: Denver Broncos at New York Jets – Game summary

Quarter	1	2	3	4	Total
**Broncos**	3	14	7	7	**31**
Jets	7	0	3	7	**17**

at MetLife Stadium, East Rutherford, New Jersey

- Date: October 12
- Game time: 1:00 p.m. EDT
- Game weather: Clear, 61 °F (16 °C)
- Game attendance: 78,160
- Referee: Brad Allen
- TV announcers (CBS): Ian Eagle, Dan Fouts and Jenny Dell
- Recap, Gamebook

=== Week 7: at New England Patriots ===
Week 7: New York Jets at New England Patriots – Game summary

Quarter	1	2	3	4	Total
Jets	6	6	7	6	**25**
**Patriots**	7	10	3	7	**27**

at Gillette Stadium, Foxborough, Massachusetts

- Date: October 16
- Game time: 8:30 p.m. EDT
- Game weather: Cloudy, 64 °F (18 °C)
- Game attendance: 68,756
- Referee: Bill Leavy
- TV announcers (CBS/NFLN): Jim Nantz, Phil Simms and Tracy Wolfson
- Recap, Gamebook

The Patriots defeated the Jets, 27–25. The Jets' offense drove to the Patriots' red zone on all four of their first-half drives. However, they were held to four field goals while the Patriots scored two touchdowns and a field goal, building a 17–12 halftime lead. On their first drive in the second half, the Jets reached the end zone and took a 19–17 lead. The Patriots then scored ten unanswered points to go up 27–19. The Jets had a chance to tie the game with a touchdown and a two-point conversion. However, Jets QB Geno Smith's game-tying pass was overthrown, and the Patriots led 27–25. After a failed onside kick recovery, the Jets forced a three and out and got the ball back with just over one minute remaining. The Jets drove from their 12-yard line to the Patriots' 40-yard line. With 5 seconds remaining, Jets kicker Nick Folk was sent out to kick a game-winning 58-yard field goal. The kick was blocked, and the Patriots held on for a 27–25 victory. With the loss, the Jets fell to 1–6 as they lost their sixth consecutive game and remained in 4th place in the AFC East. The Jets' six-game losing streak is the longest losing streak under head coach Rex Ryan. The loss represented the first time that the Jets had lost six consecutive games since they dropped six in a row from Weeks 4–9 during the 2007 season. The loss also led to a trade the next day with the Seahawks for receiver Percy Harvin.

=== Week 8: vs. Buffalo Bills ===
Week 8: Buffalo Bills at New York Jets – Game summary

Quarter	1	2	3	4	Total
**Bills**	14	10	6	13	**43**
Jets	0	17	0	6	**23**

at MetLife Stadium, East Rutherford, New Jersey

- Date: October 26
- Game time: 1:00 p.m. EDT
- Game weather: Mostly cloudy, 59 °F (15 °C)
- Game attendance: 78,160
- Referee: Gene Steratore
- TV announcers (CBS): Kevin Harlan and Rich Gannon
- Recap, Gamebook

Geno Smith would be benched in the 1st quarter after throwing 3 interceptions and posting a QBR of 0.04. Overall, the Jets committed 6 turnovers and committed 10 penalties and were routed 43–23 by their rivals.

=== Week 9: at Kansas City Chiefs ===
Week 9: New York Jets at Kansas City Chiefs – Game summary

Quarter	1	2	3	4	Total
Jets	0	10	0	0	**10**
**Chiefs**	14	7	3	0	**24**

at Arrowhead Stadium, Kansas City, Missouri

- Date: November 2
- Game time: 1:00 p.m. EST/12:00 p.m. CST
- Game weather: Sunny, 57 °F (14 °C)
- Game attendance: 74,127
- Referee: Tony Corrente
- TV announcers (CBS): Greg Gumbel, Trent Green and Evan Washburn
- Recap, Gamebook

Game information

**First quarter**

- KC – Jamaal Charles 1-yard run (Cairo Santos kick), 8:43. Chiefs 7–0. **Drive: 12 plays, 81 yards, 6:22.**
- KC – Anthony Fasano 2-yard pass from Alex Smith (Cairo Santos kick), 3:25. Chiefs 14–0. **Drive: 6 plays, 71 yards, 3:40.**

**Second quarter**

- NYJ – Eric Decker 3-yard pass from Michael Vick (Nick Folk kick), 2:14. Chiefs 14–7. **Drive: 15 plays, 81 yards, 8:57.**
- KC – Travis Kelce 12-yard pass from Alex Smith (Cairo Santos kick), 0:44. Chiefs 21–7. **Drive: 4 plays, 29 yards, 1:30.**
- NYJ – Nick Folk 39-yard field goal, 0:04. Chiefs 21–10. **Drive: 4 plays, 12 yards, 0:39.**

**Third quarter**

- KC – Cairo Santos 19-yard field goal, 5:09. Chiefs 24–10. **Drive: 16 plays, 75 yards, 8:00.**

**Fourth quarter**

- No scoring plays.

**Top passers**

- NYJ – Michael Vick – 21/28, 196 yards, TD
- KC – Alex Smith – 21/31, 199 yards, 2 TD

**Top rushers**

- NYJ – Chris Johnson – 11 rushes, 69 yards
- KC – Jamaal Charles – 20 rushes, 78 yards, TD

**Top receivers**

- NYJ – Percy Harvin – 11 receptions, 129 yards
- KC – Travis Kelce – 4 receptions, 67 yards, TD

=== Week 10: vs. Pittsburgh Steelers ===
Week 10: Pittsburgh Steelers at New York Jets – Game summary

Quarter	1	2	3	4	Total
Steelers	0	3	0	10	**13**
**Jets**	17	0	3	0	**20**

at MetLife Stadium, East Rutherford, New Jersey

- Date: November 9
- Game time: 1:00 p.m. EST
- Game weather: Sunny, 58 °F (14 °C)
- Game attendance: 78,160
- Referee: Terry McAulay
- TV announcers (CBS): Kevin Harlan, Rich Gannon and Otis Livingston
- Recap, Gamebook

=== Week 12: at Buffalo Bills ===
Week 12: New York Jets at Buffalo Bills – Game summary

Quarter	1	2	3	4	Total
Jets	3	0	0	0	**3**
**Bills**	7	7	17	7	**38**

at Ford Field, Detroit, Michigan

- Date: November 24
- Game time: 7:00 p.m. EST
- Game weather: None (indoor stadium)
- Game attendance: 56,044
- Referee: Pete Morelli
- TV announcers (CBS): Spero Dedes, Solomon Wilcots and Steve Tasker
- Recap, Gamebook

With the loss, the Jets fell to 2–9, and were mathematically eliminated from postseason contention for the fourth consecutive season.

=== Week 13: vs. Miami Dolphins ===
Week 13: Miami Dolphins at New York Jets – Game summary

Quarter	1	2	3	4	Total
**Dolphins**	0	3	3	10	**16**
Jets	7	3	3	0	**13**

at MetLife Stadium, East Rutherford, New Jersey

- Date: December 1
- Game time: 8:30 p.m. EST
- Game weather: Rain, 42 °F (6 °C)
- Game attendance: 78,160
- Referee: Ron Torbert
- TV announcers (ESPN): Mike Tirico, Jon Gruden and Lisa Salters
- Recap, Gamebook

=== Week 14: at Minnesota Vikings ===
Week 14: New York Jets at Minnesota Vikings – Game summary

Quarter	1	2	3	4	OT	Total
Jets	12	3	3	6	0	**24**
**Vikings**	14	7	0	3	6	**30**

at TCF Bank Stadium, Minneapolis, Minnesota

- Date: December 7
- Game time: 1:00 p.m. EST/12:00 p.m. CST
- Game weather: Cloudy, 32 °F (0 °C)
- Game attendance: 52,152
- Referee: Jerome Boger
- TV announcers (CBS): Spero Dedes and Solomon Wilcots
- Recap, Gamebook

Game information

**First quarter**

- MIN – Gerald Hodges 27-yard interception return (Blair Walsh kick), 14:54. Vikings 7–0.
- NYJ – Sheldon Richardson sack for safety, 10:12. Vikings 7–2.
- NYJ – Percy Harvin 35-yard pass from Geno Smith (Nick Folk kick), 7:35. Jets 9–7. **Drive: 5 plays, 65 yards, 2:37.**
- MIN – Charles Johnson 56-yard pass from Teddy Bridgewater (Blair Walsh kick), 5:43. Vikings 14–9. **Drive: 4 plays, 70 yards, 1:42.**
- NYJ – Nick Folk 36-yard field goal, 2:28. Vikings 14–12. **Drive: 6 plays, 17 yards, 3:25.**

**Second quarter**

- MIN – Jerome Felton 0-yard fumble recovery (Blair Walsh kick), 13:44. Vikings 21–12. **Drive: 7 plays, 58 yards, 3:56.**
- NYJ – Nick Folk 33-yard field goal, 0:17. Vikings 21–15. **Drive: 12 plays, 50 yards, 3:30.**

**Third quarter**

- NYJ – Nick Folk 22-yard field goal, 12:24. Vikings 21–18. **Drive: 6 plays, 22 yards, 2:32.**

**Fourth quarter**

- NYJ – Nick Folk 24-yard field goal, 14:15. Tied 21–21. **Drive: 11 plays, 65 yards, 5:48.**
- MIN – Blair Walsh 20-yard field goal, 5:28. Vikings 24–21. **Drive: 7 plays, 45 yards, 3:12.**
- NYJ – Nick Folk 44-yard field goal, 0:23. Tied 24–24. **Drive: 9 plays, 45 yards, 2:44.**

**Overtime**

- MIN – Jarius Wright 87-yard pass from Teddy Bridgewater, 10:35. Vikings 30–24. **Drive: 3 plays, 92 yards, 1:39.**

**Top passers**

- NYJ – Geno Smith – 18/29, 254 yards, TD
- MIN – Teddy Bridgewater – 19/27, 309 yards, 2 TD

**Top rushers**

- NYJ – Chris Ivory – 16 rushes, 73 yards
- MIN – Matt Asiata – 19 rushes, 54 yards

**Top receivers**

- NYJ – Percy Harvin – 6 receptions, 124 yards, TD
- MIN – Jarius Wright – 4 receptions, 123 yards, TD

The Jets were the only AFC East team to lose to all of their NFC North opponents.

=== Week 15: at Tennessee Titans ===
Week 15: New York Jets at Tennessee Titans – Game summary

Quarter	1	2	3	4	Total
**Jets**	0	3	7	6	**16**
Titans	3	2	6	0	**11**

at LP Field, Nashville, Tennessee

- Date: December 14
- Game time: 4:05 p.m. EST/3:05 p.m. CST
- Game weather: Cloudy, 54 °F (12 °C)
- Game attendance: 69,143
- Referee: John Parry
- TV announcers (CBS): Andrew Catalon, Steve Beuerlein and Steve Tasker
- Recap, Gamebook

=== Week 16: vs. New England Patriots ===
Week 16: New England Patriots at New York Jets – Game summary

Quarter	1	2	3	4	Total
**Patriots**	0	7	3	7	**17**
Jets	0	10	3	3	**16**

at MetLife Stadium, East Rutherford, New Jersey

- Date: December 21
- Game time: 1:00 p.m. EST
- Game weather: Cloudy, 34 °F (1 °C)
- Game attendance: 78,160
- Referee: Brad Allen
- TV announcers (CBS): Spero Dedes and Solomon Wilcots
- Recap, Gamebook

=== Week 17: at Miami Dolphins ===
Week 17: New York Jets at Miami Dolphins – Game summary

Quarter	1	2	3	4	Total
**Jets**	7	7	10	13	**37**
Dolphins	3	14	7	0	**24**

at Sun Life Stadium, Miami Gardens, Florida

- Date: December 28
- Game time: 1:00 p.m. EST
- Game weather: Partly cloudy, 80 °F (27 °C)
- Game attendance: 70,220
- Referee: Craig Wrolstad
- TV announcers (CBS): Andrew Catalon, Steve Beuerlein and Steve Tasker
- Recap, Gamebook

Game information

**First quarter**

- MIA – Caleb Sturgis 37-yard field goal, 6:13. Dolphins 3–0. **Drive: 8 plays, 46 yards, 4:18.**
- NYJ – Chris Owusu 23-yard run (Nick Folk kick), 3:11. Jets 7–3. **Drive: 6 plays, 78 yards, 3:02.**

**Second quarter**

- MIA – Daniel Thomas 1-yard run (Caleb Sturgis kick), 10:44. Dolphins 10–7. **Drive: 5 plays, 21 yards, 2:43.**
- NYJ – Chris Ivory 8-yard pass from Geno Smith (Nick Folk kick), 6:44. Jets 14–10. **Drive: 7 plays, 79 yards, 4:00.**
- MIA – Charles Clay 23-yard pass from Ryan Tannehill (Caleb Sturgis kick), 0:43. Dolphins 17–14. **Drive: 11 plays, 93 yards, 2:49.**

**Third quarter**

- MIA – Lamar Miller 97-yard run (Caleb Sturgis kick), 12:51. Dolphins 24–14. **Drive: 1 play, 97 yards, 0:14.**
- NYJ – Eric Decker 74-yard pass from Geno Smith (Nick Folk kick), 11:35. Dolphins 24–21. **Drive: 3 plays, 80 yards, 1:16.**
- NYJ – Nick Folk 26-yard field goal, 6:35. Tied 24–24. **Drive: 7 plays, 56 yards, 2:54.**

**Fourth quarter**

- NYJ – Nick Folk 23-yard field goal, 14:12. Jets 27–24. **Drive: 11 plays, 78 yards, 5:08.**
- NYJ – Jeff Cumberland 23-yard pass from Geno Smith (Nick Folk kick), 3:22. Jets 34–24. **Drive: 6 plays, 73 yards, 2:24.**
- NYJ – Nick Folk 39-yard field goal, 0:39. Jets 37–24. **Drive: 4 plays, 0 yards, 1:40.**

**Top passers**

- NYJ – Geno Smith – 20/25, 358 yards, 3 TD
- MIA – Ryan Tannehill – 23/39, 259 yards, TD

**Top rushers**

- NYJ – Chris Ivory – 13 rushes, 29 yards
- MIA – Lamar Miller – 19 rushes, 178 yards, TD

**Top receivers**

- NYJ – Eric Decker – 10 receptions, 221 yards, TD
- MIA – Brian Hartline – 5 receptions, 94 yards

Quarterback Geno Smith finished the season by posting a perfect 158.3 passer rating against the Dolphins.

=== Standings ===
==== Division ====
AFC East
	W	L	T	PCT	DIV	CONF	PF	PA	STK
^{(1)} New England Patriots	12	4	0	.750	4–2	9–3	468	313	L1
Buffalo Bills	9	7	0	.563	4–2	5–7	343	289	W1
Miami Dolphins	8	8	0	.500	3–3	6–6	388	373	L1
New York Jets	4	12	0	.250	1–5	4–8	283	401	W1

==== Conference ====
AFC
#	Team	Division	W	L	T	PCT	DIV	CONF	SOS	SOV	STK
**Division leaders**
1 (Note: New England defeated Denver head-to-head (Week 9, 43–21).)	New England Patriots	East	12	4	0	.750	4–2	9–3	.514	.487	L1
2	Denver Broncos	West	12	4	0	.750	6–0	10–2	.521	.484	W1
3 (Note: Pittsburgh defeated Indianapolis head-to-head (Week 8, 51–34).)	Pittsburgh Steelers	North	11	5	0	.688	4–2	9–3	.451	.486	W4
4	Indianapolis Colts	South	11	5	0	.688	6–0	9–3	.479	.372	W1
**Wild Cards**
5	Cincinnati Bengals	North	10	5	1	.656	3–3	7–5	.498	.425	L1
6	Baltimore Ravens	North	10	6	0	.625	3–3	6–6	.475	.378	W1
**Did not qualify for the postseason**
7 (Note: Kansas City finished ahead of San Diego in the AFC West based on head-to-head sweep (Week 7, 23–20; Week 17, 19–7). Houston finished ahead of Kansas City and Buffalo based on conference record. Kansas City finished ahead of Buffalo based on head-to-head victory (Week 10, 17–13). San Diego finished ahead of Buffalo based on head-to-head victory (Week 3, 22–10).)	Houston Texans	South	9	7	0	.563	4–2	8–4	.447	.299	W2
8	Kansas City Chiefs	West	9	7	0	.563	3–3	7–5	.512	.500	W1
9	San Diego Chargers	West	9	7	0	.563	2–4	6–6	.512	.403	L1
10	Buffalo Bills	East	9	7	0	.563	4–2	5–7	.516	.486	W1
11	Miami Dolphins	East	8	8	0	.500	3–3	6–6	.512	.406	L1
12	Cleveland Browns	North	7	9	0	.438	2–4	4–8	.479	.371	L5
13	New York Jets	East	4	12	0	.250	1–5	4–8	.543	.375	W1
14 (Note: Jacksonville finished ahead of Oakland based on record vs. common opponents (1–4 to 0–5).)	Jacksonville Jaguars	South	3	13	0	.188	1–5	2–10	.514	.313	L1
15	Oakland Raiders	West	3	13	0	.188	1–5	2–10	.570	.542	L1
16	Tennessee Titans	South	2	14	0	.125	1–5	2–10	.506	.375	L10
**Tiebreakers** (Note: When breaking ties for three or more teams under the NFL's rules, they are first broken within divisions, then comparing only the highest ranked remaining team from each division.)

== Staff ==
2014 New York Jets staff
Front office: Chairman/CEO – Woody Johnson; President – Neil Glat; General manager – John Idzik; Senior director of football administration – Rod Graves; Manager of football administration – Jacqueline Davidson; Director of pro personnel – Brendan Prophett; Assistant director of pro personnel – Matt Bazirgan; Senior director of college scouting – Terry Bradway; Director of college scouting – Jeff Bauer; Head coaches: Head coach – Rex Ryan; Assistant head coach/running backs – Anthony Lynn; Assistant to the head coach – Kathryn Smith; Offensive coaches: Offensive coordinator – Marty Mornhinweg; Quarterbacks – David Lee; Wide receivers – Sanjay Lal; Tight ends – Steve Hagen; Offensive line – Mike Devlin; Assistant offensive line – Ron Heller; Offensive assistant – Tony Sparano Jr	Defensive coaches: Defensive coordinator – Dennis Thurman; Defensive line – Karl Dunbar; Assistant defensive line/assistant linebackers – Jeff Weeks; Linebackers – Bobby April III; Defensive backs/secondary – Tim McDonald; Assistant defensive backs – Brian Smith; Seasonal intern – D'Anton Lynn; Special teams coaches: Special teams coordinator – Thomas McGaughey; Assistant special teams – Louie Aguiar; Seasonal intern – Eric Smith; Strength and conditioning: Head strength and conditioning – Justus Galac; Assistant strength and conditioning – Aaron McLaurin; Assistant strength and conditioning – Jason Oszvart; Strength and conditioning intern – Kavan Latham

== Final roster ==
2014 New York Jets roster
Quarterbacks (QB): 5 Matt Simms; 7 Geno Smith; 1 Michael Vick; Running backs (RB): 38 John Conner FB; 33 Chris Ivory; 21 Chris Johnson; 29 Bilal Powell; Wide receivers (WR): 87 Eric Decker; 82 Quincy Enunwa; 10 T. J. Graham; 15 Saalim Hakim; 16 Percy Harvin; 11 Jeremy Kerley; 14 Chris Owusu; 18 Walt Powell; Tight ends (TE): 88 Jace Amaro; 85 Jeff Cumberland; 83 Chris Pantale; 44 Zach Sudfeld	Offensive linemen (OL): 75 Oday Aboushi G; 66 Willie Colon G; 70 Dakota Dozier T; 60 D'Brickashaw Ferguson T; 63 Dalton Freeman C; 68 Breno Giacomini T; 71 Ben Ijalana T; 72 Wesley Johnson G; 74 Nick Mangold C; Defensive linemen (DL): 99 T. J. Barnes NT; 78 Leger Douzable DE; 93 Kenrick Ellis NT; 94 Damon Harrison NT; 91 Sheldon Richardson DE; 96 Muhammad Wilkerson DE	Linebackers (LB): 58 Jason Babin OLB; 54 Nick Bellore ILB; 98 Quinton Coples OLB; 56 Demario Davis ILB; 51 IK Enemkpali OLB; 52 David Harris ILB; 97 Calvin Pace OLB; 57 Trevor Reilly OLB; Defensive backs (DB): 24 Phillip Adams CB; 39 Antonio Allen CB; 37 Jaiquawn Jarrett FS; 26 Dawan Landry FS; 25 Calvin Pryor SS; 30 Darrin Walls SS; 22 Marcus Williams CB; 20 Kyle Wilson CB; Special teams (ST): 2 Nick Folk K; 46 Tanner Purdum LS; 4 Ryan Quigley P	Practice squad: 92 Tevita Finau DE; 50 Mario Harvey LB; 62 Kerry Hyder DE; 34 Keith Lewis CB; 31 Dashaun Phillips CB; 79 Brent Qvale T; 35 Daryl Richardson RB; 93 Kona Schwenke NT; 55 Chris Young LB; Reserve: 40 Tommy Bohanon FB (IR); 55 Jermaine Cunningham LB (IR); 81 Shaq Evans WR (IR); 43 Dexter McDougle CB (IR); 45 Rontez Miles SS (IR); 27 Dee Milliner CB (IR); 17 Greg Salas WR (IR); 67 Brian Winters G (IR); Rookies in italics 53 active, 8 reserve, 9 practice squad
