= List of Missouri State Bears in the NFL draft =

This is a list of Missouri State Bears football players in the NFL draft.

== Key ==
B	Back	K	Kicker	NT	Nose tackle
C	Center	LB	Linebacker	FB	Fullback
DB	Defensive back	P	Punter	HB	Halfback
DE	Defensive end	QB	Quarterback	WR	Wide receiver
DT	Defensive tackle	RB	Running back	G	Guard
E	End	T	Offensive tackle	TE	Tight end

= Pro Bowler
= Hall of Famer

== Selections ==
Year	Round	Pick	Player	Team	Position	Notes
1944	28	293	Charlie Mitchell	Chicago Bears	C	
1951	17	199	Henry May	Chicago Cardinals	C	
1952	18	217	Bob Dees	Los Angeles Rams	T	
1956	26	307	Jim Lohr	Baltimore Colts	T	
1958	25	299	Bill Kaczmarek	San Francisco 49ers	C	
1968	9	226	Sam McDowell	Miami Dolphins	T	
1968	16	427	Pat Talbert	Kansas City Chiefs	T	
1974	2	28	Tom Mullen	New York Giants	T	
1974	7	181	Fred Tabron	Minnesota Vikings	RB	
1978	11	286	Dennis Heim	New York Giants	DT	
1979	6	159	Mike Murphy	Houston Oilers	LB	
1979	7	171	Tim Ries	Houston Oilers	DB	
1983	7	190	Darrin Newbold	New York Jets	LB	
1985	9	237	Mike Armentrout	Kansas City Chiefs	RB	
1986	6	159	Keith Williams	Atlanta Falcons	DB	
2000	7	210	Brad St. Louis	Cincinnati Bengals	LS	
2010	4	125	Clay Harbor	Philadelphia Eagles	TE	
2011	4	110	David Arkin	Dallas Cowboys	G	
2022	5	159	Eric Johnson	Indianapolis Colts	DT	

== Notable undrafted players ==
Note: No drafts held before 1920

Debut year	Player	Position	Debut team	Notes
1987	Steve Ache	LB	Minnesota Vikings	—
2007	Darren Barnett	CB	New York Giants	—
2013	Randy Richards	OT	San Diego Chargers	—
2014	Anthony Grady	DE	New York Jets	—
2017	Dylan Cole	LB	Houston Texans	—
2023	Ty Scott	WR	Kansas City Chiefs	—
2024	Terique Owens	WR	San Francisco 49ers	—
2025	Jacardia Wright	RB	Seattle Seahawks	—
2026	Jacob Clark	QB	Las Vegas Raiders	—
