= Rex Ryan =

American football coach and analyst (born 1962)

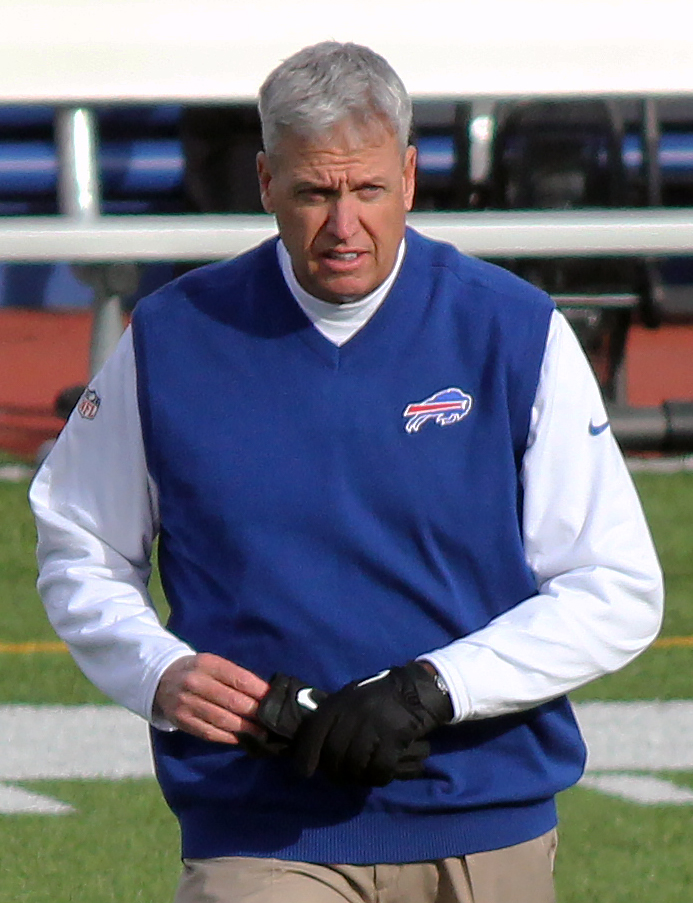
- Ryan while head coach of the Buffalo Bills in 2015

Personal information
- Born: December 13, 1962 (age 63); Ardmore, Oklahoma, U.S.

Career information
- High school: Stevenson (Lincolnshire, Illinois)
- College: Southwestern Oklahoma State

Career history
- Eastern Kentucky (1987–1988) Graduate assistant; New Mexico Highlands (1989) Assistant head coach & defensive coordinator; Morehead State (1990–1993) Defensive coordinator; Arizona Cardinals (1994–1995) Defensive line & linebackers coach; Cincinnati (1996–1997) Defensive coordinator; Oklahoma (1998) Defensive coordinator; Baltimore Ravens (1999–2008); Defensive line coach (1999–2004); Defensive coordinator (2005–2007); Assistant head coach & defensive coordinator (2008); New York Jets (2009–2014) Head coach; Buffalo Bills (2015–2016) Head coach

Awards and highlights
- Super Bowl champion (XXXV); PFWA NFL Assistant Coach of the Year (2006)

Head coaching record
- Regular season: 61–66 (.480)
- Postseason: 4–2 (.667)
- Career: 65–68 (.489)
- Coaching profile at Pro Football Reference

Rex Ashley Ryan (born December 13, 1962) is an American former football coach and current analyst. Ryan was the head coach of the New York Jets and Buffalo Bills of the National Football League (NFL), and also held various coaching positions with seven other NFL and college teams.

He and his fraternal twin brother Rob Ryan are sons of former head coach Buddy Ryan. From a young age, Ryan aspired to follow in his father's footsteps and become a professional football coach. After spending the majority of his youth in Canada, he returned to the United States as a teenager where he attended college at Southwestern Oklahoma State University. Upon graduating, Ryan spent the next 22 years serving as an assistant coach on different teams at both the college and professional level.

At the behest of their head coach Brian Billick, Ryan joined the Baltimore Ravens in 1999 and spent ten years there. In 2005, he became the defensive coordinator, and later was promoted to be the team's assistant head coach in 2008. Ryan later accepted a contract offer from the Jets for their vacant head coaching position for the 2009 season. During his tenure, Ryan became well known throughout the league for his outspoken manner, boisterous attitude, and initial success with the Jets. In his first two seasons as the Jets' head coach, he led the team to back-to-back AFC Championship Game appearances. Ryan's subsequent tenure was a period of struggles, as the Jets were unable to finish with a record above a .500 winning percentage. After a career worst 4–12 record at the conclusion of the 2014 season, Ryan was fired as the team's head coach. Shortly after his firing from the Jets, Ryan was hired to be the Bills' head coach, where he lasted two years with the team before being fired at the end of the 2016 season. Afterwards, he was hired by ESPN, where he currently serves as an analyst, including on Sunday NFL Countdown.

== Early life ==
Rex Ryan and his fraternal twin, Rob, were born in Ardmore, Oklahoma, on December 13, 1962, to Doris and Buddy Ryan. When the boys were aged two, their parents amicably divorced. Following the divorce, their mother attended the University of Chicago to earn her doctorate. Rex, Rob, and their older brother Jim moved with her to Toronto, Ontario, Canada, where she secured an administrative position at the University of Toronto. During the course of his upbringing, Rex wanted to follow in the footsteps of his father, a defensive pioneer in the NFL known for developing the 46 defense, and by the age of six, Rex and Rob knew they wanted to pursue coaching careers.

In Canada, there was little emphasis on football, much to the disappointment of Rex. By the time Rex was a teenager, Doris realized he and his brothers were too much to handle for a single mother trying to advance her career. She decided it was in the best interest of the brothers to send them to live with their father, who was the defensive line coach for the Minnesota Vikings at the time. The reasons behind this were to keep them out of trouble and to help them expand their knowledge of the game of football where it was more prevalent.

In 1978, when Buddy was hired by the Chicago Bears as their defensive coordinator, Rex, Rob, and Jim followed their father to Illinois where the family settled in Lincolnshire, Illinois. The brothers attended Stevenson High School in Lincolnshire.

Rex went on to attend Southwestern Oklahoma State University in Weatherford, Oklahoma, alongside Rob, and played for the football team as a defensive end. He graduated from Southwestern Oklahoma in 1986, and in 2011 was inducted into the university's Hall of Fame.

== Collegiate coaching ==
Upon graduating from Southwestern in 1986, with the help of his father, Ryan secured a job as a graduate assistant on the Division I-AA (now Division I FCS) Eastern Kentucky Colonels football team. At Eastern Kentucky, he had a multitude of responsibilities which ranged from making copies of game plans to picking players up at the airport. The Colonels won the Ohio Valley Conference title in the two years Ryan served as an assistant. At the age of 26, Ryan became the assistant head coach and defensive coordinator at Division II New Mexico Highlands for a year, during which the team led the league in defensive turnovers. After his stint with New Mexico Highlands, Ryan joined Division I Morehead State as the defensive coordinator, where he remained for four years. During his tenure, the defense was ranked among the highest in the nation.

After working for his father for two years with the NFL's Arizona Cardinals, Ryan returned to college coaching as the defensive coordinator for the Cincinnati Bearcats. The Bearcats won the first Humanitarian Bowl over Utah State in Ryan's final year, marking the team's first bowl appearance in fifty years. Ryan was the Oklahoma Sooners' defensive coordinator for a year in which the defense was ranked sixth in the nation. However, head coach John Blake failed to achieve a winning record for a third straight year and subsequently, the entire staff was fired. Ryan served as defensive coordinator at Kansas State for a month in 1999 under head coach Bill Snyder.

== National Football League ==
=== Assistant coach ===
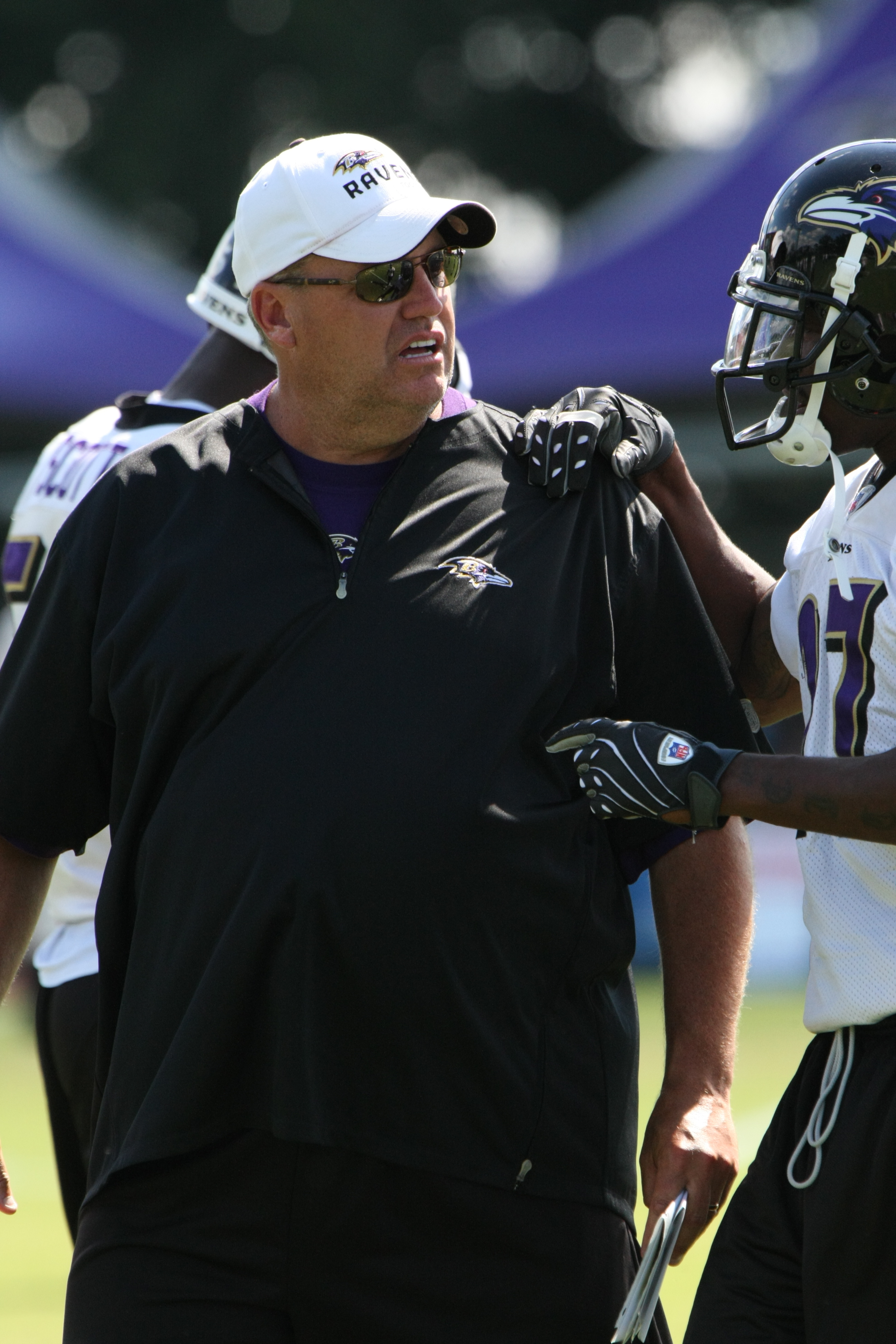
Ryan as the Ravens' defensive coordinator, August 2008

When his father was hired as the head coach of the Arizona Cardinals in 1994, he offered Rex his first job in the NFL as a defensive assistant, working with the team's linebackers and defensive linemen. After nine straight losing seasons prior to Buddy's arrival, the Cardinals produced an 8–8 record in Buddy's first year as head coach. However, in his second season, the team went 4–12 and subsequently, the entire staff was fired despite the positive performance of the defense.

Ryan went on to coach at three different colleges following his tenure with the Cardinals, though by the time he joined Kansas State in 1999, he was hopeful of a return to the NFL. Ryan received a call from newly named head coach Brian Billick of the Baltimore Ravens, who wanted to interview him for the defensive line coaching position. Having visited a class Ryan was teaching earlier in his career, Billick had been so impressed by Ryan's passion for the game of football that he decided to hire Ryan if he ever attained a head coaching position. When offered the position, Ryan accepted.

In his first year, the defense was ranked second overall in the NFL and second in rushing yards allowed. By his second year, in 2000, the Ravens' defense set NFL records for fewest rushing yards allowed. The defense allowed a combined 23 points in four playoff games en route to a Super Bowl XXXV victory (7 coming off a kickoff return touchdown in the Super Bowl), Ryan's only Super Bowl ring, over the New York Giants. The defense consistently performed well in the following years. As a result, Ryan was promoted to defensive coordinator in 2005 following the departure of Mike Nolan, who became the head coach of the San Francisco 49ers. In 2006, Ryan received Assistant Coach of the Year awards from Pro Football Weekly and the Pro Football Writers Association.

Upon the conclusion of the Ravens' 5–11 performance in 2007, the entire staff was dismissed on New Year's Eve. Ryan was one of the candidates interviewed by the Ravens for their head coaching vacancy; however, the Ravens chose to name John Harbaugh as the team's new head coach. Ryan also interviewed with Miami and Atlanta about filling their head coaching vacancies, but the offers went to Tony Sparano and Mike Smith respectively.

Ryan was disappointed by his failure to obtain a head coaching job, but he agreed to return to Baltimore under the direction of Harbaugh, who retained Ryan as defensive coordinator and promoted him to assistant head coach. In 2008, Ryan's final year with the team, the defense was ranked second overall in the NFL. The Ravens lost by a score of 23–14 in the AFC Championship Game against the Pittsburgh Steelers. Ryan's nine-year tenure with the Ravens, during which the defense never ranked lower than sixth overall in the NFL, concluded an hour later when he accepted the head coaching position with the New York Jets.

=== New York Jets ===
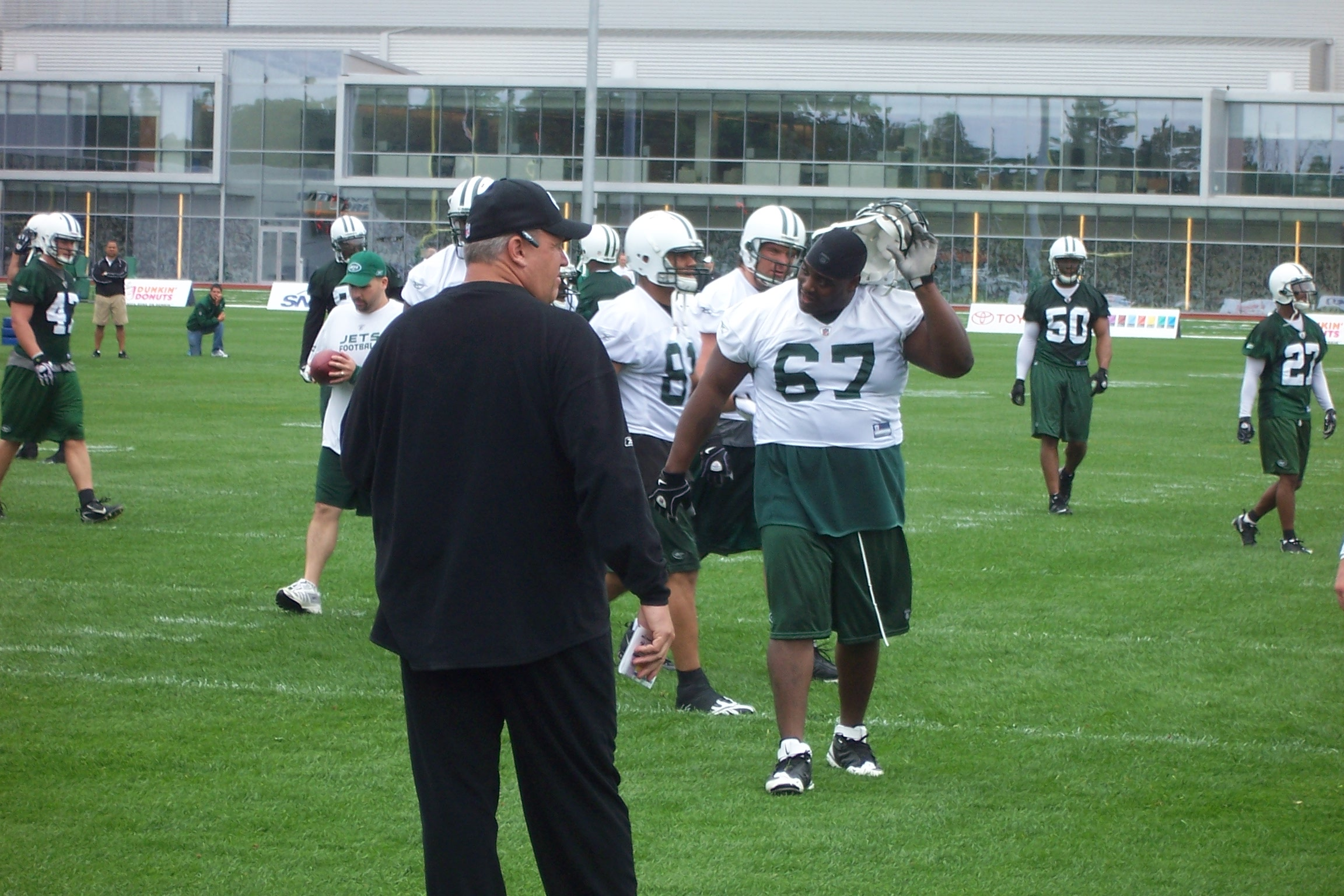
Ryan as head coach, conducting a June 2009 New York Jets mini-camp at their Florham Park, New Jersey training center

Following a late season collapse in which the Jets missed the playoffs after losing four of their final five games, the team fired head coach Eric Mangini on December 29, 2008. The team interviewed a host of candidates, including Ryan, Jeff Jagodzinski, Russ Grimm, Bill Callahan, and Brian Schottenheimer; however, the contract, which was valued at approximately $11.5 million over the course of four years, was ultimately offered to Ryan.

Accepting the offer on January 19, 2009, Ryan immediately began to carry out a plan of action that he had outlined for the franchise's future. He planned to remove the players from distractions on and off the field and allow them get to know one another to build team chemistry. Thus, training camp was moved to the campus of SUNY Cortland, where the team would be relatively secluded from the media and any other distractions. Ryan and general manager Mike Tannenbaum were also determined to draft a quarterback who could lead and be the face of the franchise. As a result, the team traded up to select Mark Sanchez of USC in the first round with the fifth overall pick in the 2009 NFL draft.

==== 2009 season ====
The Jets opened their season against the Houston Texans. Ryan began his head coaching career with a 24–7 victory over the Texans in which the Jets' defense shut out their opponents' offense. Houston's lone score came on a fumble return for a touchdown. The following week, the defense did not allow a touchdown against the New England Patriots in a 16–9 victory at home, marking the Jets' first home victory over New England since 2000. Ryan and the Jets went on to defeat the Tennessee Titans in Week 3, marking the first time the Jets opened the season at 3–0 since 2004. The victory also allowed Ryan to become the Jets' first rookie head coach to win his first three games since Al Groh did so in 2000. Despite their hot start, New York went on to lose six of their next seven games save for a shutout victory over the Oakland Raiders, 38–0.

The team eventually recovered and won five of their final six games despite Ryan mistakenly stating the Jets had been eliminated from playoff contention following a loss to the Atlanta Falcons. The Jets defeated a previously unbeaten Indianapolis Colts—a game not without controversy following Jim Caldwell's decision to pull Indianapolis' starters with the Colts leading. The Colts, who had already clinched a playoff berth, had little to play for aside from a perfect record. In the final game of the season, the Jets defeated the Cincinnati Bengals 37–0 at Giants Stadium, the final sporting event to be held at the venue, as the defense held Cincinnati to 72 total rushing yards, and 0 total yards passing. The victory secured the Jets' playoff berth as a wild card team. Under Ryan, the Jets finished the regular season ranked first overall in the NFL in rushing yards and total defense. New York defeated Cincinnati again the following week, this time at Paul Brown Stadium, in the AFC Wild Card playoff round by a score of 24–14. On January 17, 2010, Ryan coached the Jets in an upset over the San Diego Chargers, 17–14, on their way to the AFC Championship Game. The Jets subsequently lost to the Colts, 30–17, after leading in the first half of the game. Ryan became embroiled in controversy a few days later when he made an obscene gesture towards heckling Dolphins fans who spat on him during a Strikeforce mixed martial arts event at BankAtlantic Center in Sunrise, Florida. Ryan apologized for his action, stating that it was "stupid and inappropriate." Ryan was fined $50,000 by the Jets.

==== 2010 season ====
As Ryan headed into his second year as the team's head coach, the club announced he had been given a two-year contract extension. Ryan continued to exude confidence in the team, writing on ESPN's training camp tour bus "Soon To Be Champs" in August, referencing that the Jets would make it to the Super Bowl and become the eventual champions. Ryan had been asked to sign the Jets' logo on the back of the bus but included the message with his signature. The prediction was met with some criticism while others praised his brashness, something that was felt to be lacking in the NFL at the time. When the team appeared on the television series Hard Knocks that same month, Ryan was criticized, particularly by former head coach Tony Dungy, for his use of foul language. Dungy and Ryan later met in person to reconcile their differences. Ryan's championship claims were nearly proven correct as the Jets opened the season with the best record in the NFL at 9–2. This set the stage for a Monday Night Football matchup with their division rival, the Patriots, who were also 9–2. The Patriots, behind the strong performance of quarterback Tom Brady, defeated the Jets 45–3. However, the Jets finished the season with an 11–5 record and qualified as a wild card team in the playoffs. The Jets were one win short of tying the franchise record in wins set by the 1998 team led by Bill Parcells.

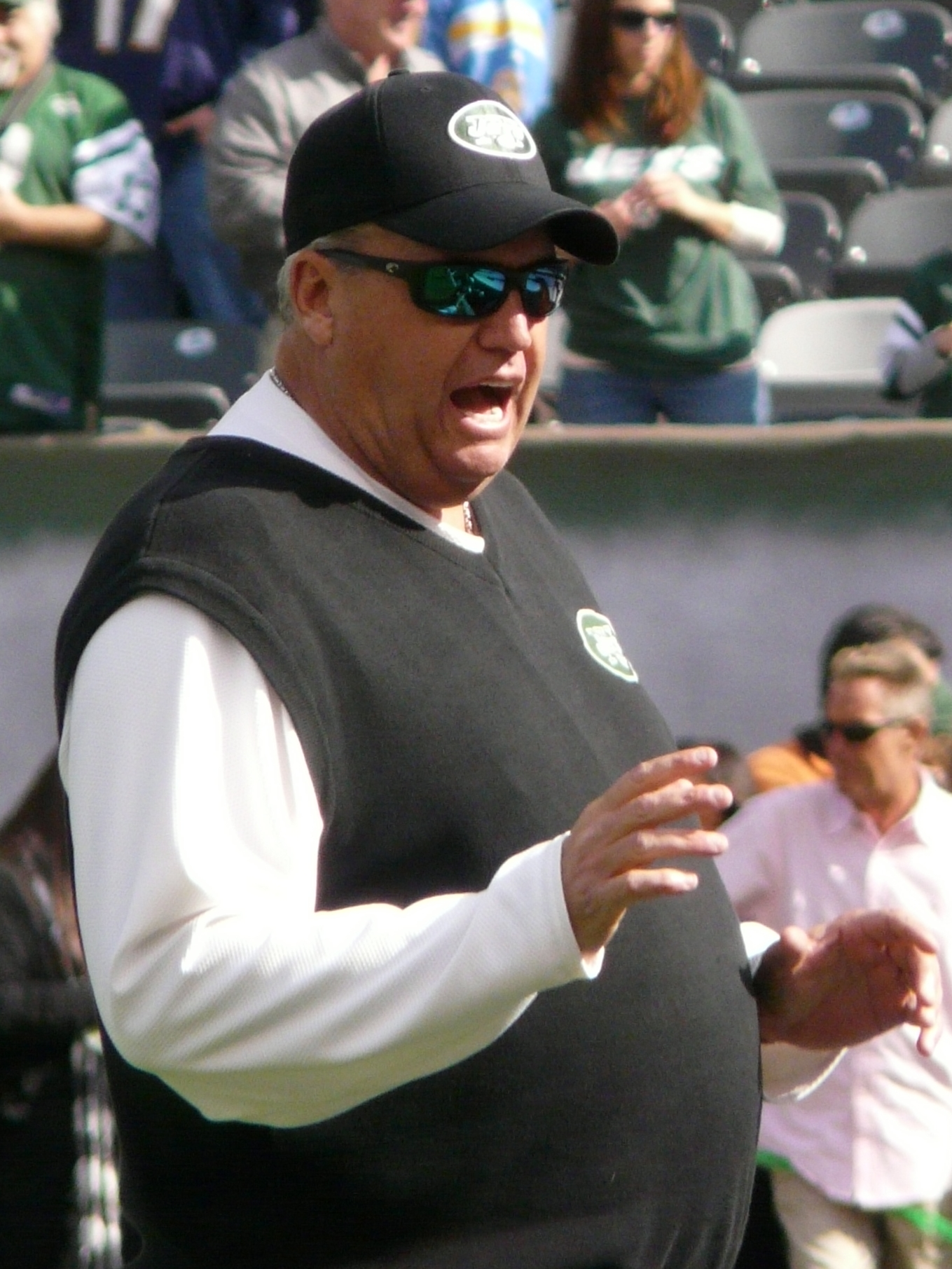
Ryan in 2011

In the wild-card round, the sixth-seeded Jets beat the AFC South champion and third-seeded Colts 17–16 on January 8, 2011, at the Colts' home field, Lucas Oil Stadium, to qualify for the Divisional Playoffs. The following week, on January 16, they defeated the AFC East champion and first-seeded Patriots 28–21, ending New England's eight-game winning streak. The victory made the Jets the first team to win back-to-back road playoff games in consecutive seasons, and qualified them to advance to the AFC Championship Game for the second consecutive season, where they lost on the road to the AFC North champion Pittsburgh Steelers 24–19. The 2010 AFC Championship Game remains the last playoff game played by the Jets.

==== 2011 season ====
The Jets opened their 2011 campaign with a 2–3 record, leading to discontent within their clubhouse. The team had begun to stray from its philosophy of consistently running the ball and began to pass more often, but the offense struggled with this adjustment. Wide receivers Plaxico Burress, Santonio Holmes, and Derrick Mason reportedly approached coach Ryan to question offensive coordinator Brian Schottenheimer's system. Ryan, meanwhile, had begun to isolate himself from the rest of the team as he became less "hands-on" and opted to have his assistants coach the players at their respective positions. Ryan attracted further attention to the team during a Sunday Night Football game against the New England Patriots when he responded to a heckling fan with an obscene remark and was fined $75,000 by the league. Despite struggling to an 8–7 record, the Jets still had the ability to attain a playoff berth if they won their regular season finale against the Miami Dolphins in combination with the outcome of three other games played that day.

However, the discontent within the locker room and the team's overall struggles culminated with Holmes criticizing and arguing with teammates in the huddle against Miami. Holmes was benched in the fourth quarter while the Jets subsequently lost 19–17, ending their postseason pursuit. After the Jets finished the season with a disappointing 8–8 record, Ryan admitted to having lost the pulse of the team. Then free agent running back LaDainian Tomlinson remarked that Ryan's Super Bowl predictions had an adverse effect on the locker room by placing undue pressure on the players. Ryan conceded this point and announced that he would refrain from making such statements publicly in the future.

==== 2012 season ====
Through 11 weeks in 2012, the Jets struggled to a 4–7 record. The presence of quarterback Tim Tebow created a controversy as the media and fans called for Ryan to bench the inconsistent Mark Sanchez in favor of Tebow. Ryan was criticized for his decision to keep Tebow activated during the Jets' Thanksgiving Day contest against the New England Patriots despite Tebow playing with two broken ribs, leading to questions about his job security. With Tebow inactive for the Jets' following contest against the Arizona Cardinals, Ryan made the decision to bench Sanchez, who threw three interceptions, in favor of Greg McElroy. McElroy threw a touchdown pass to tight end Jeff Cumberland to score the team's only points in a 7–6 victory over Arizona.

Ryan renamed Sanchez the starting quarterback the following Wednesday after seeking out multiple opinions within the organization. In a must win game against the Tennessee Titans to remain in playoff contention, Sanchez struggled; he completed 13 of his 28 passes for 131 yards while throwing four interceptions and fumbling the ball in Titans territory in the closing minutes of the Jets' 14–10 defeat. A day later, Ryan announced McElroy would start. Sanchez started the final game of the season after McElroy suffered a concussion in his lone start. Sanchez's struggles continued as the Jets fell to the Buffalo Bills and ended their year with a 6–10 record, their first losing season under Rex Ryan. On December 31, 2012, the Jets fired general manager Mike Tannenbaum, but announced that Ryan would return for the 2013 season.

==== 2013 season ====
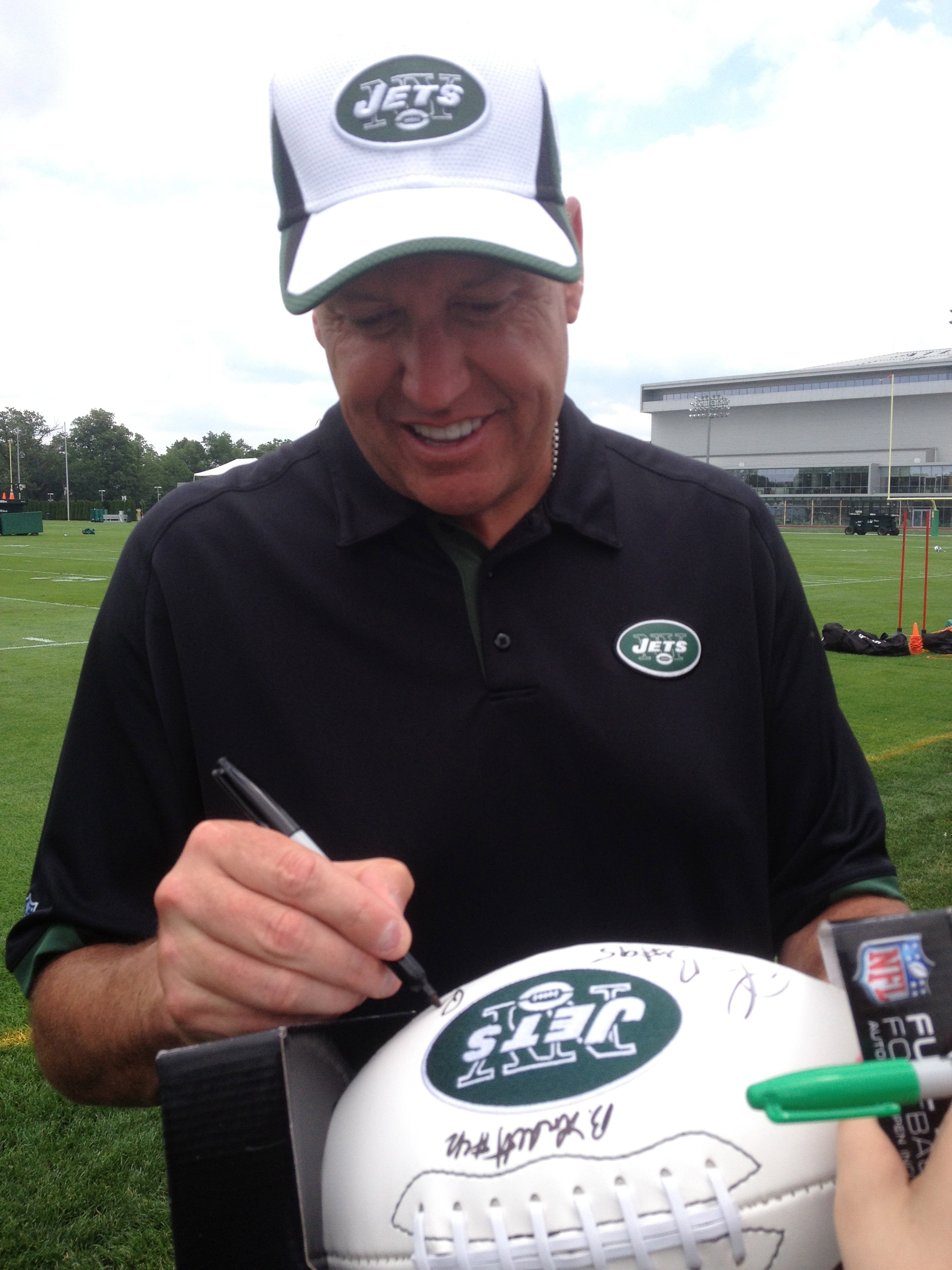
Ryan while coach of the Jets in June 2013

For the 2013 campaign, Ryan overhauled his coaching staff, promoting Dennis Thurman to defensive coordinator while adding several new coaches including offensive coordinator Marty Mornhinweg. Newly hired general manager John Idzik emphasized there would be competition at all positions including quarterback. The Jets drafted Geno Smith in the second round of the 2013 NFL draft to compete with Sanchez. Ryan was widely criticized for his decision to insert Sanchez late in a preseason game against the New York Giants after Sanchez suffered a season-ending shoulder injury which led to Smith being named the starter.

Through their first nine games of the year, the Jets went 5–4 and earned Ryan some early Coach of the Year consideration. The team proceeded to lose their next three contests as the rookie Smith committed eight turnovers while failing to score during that stretch. This prompted speculation by analysts as to whether or not Ryan would be fired. The Jets broke their losing streak with a 37–27 win over the Raiders that kept them in playoff contention. The following week, the Jets played the Carolina Panthers and trailed by three points heading into the fourth quarter. In the span of five minutes, the Panthers scored twice and the Jets were unable to complete a comeback attempt, losing 20–30. The loss eliminated the Jets from playoff contention.

New York played the Cleveland Browns a week later. In a meeting before the game, Ryan told his players that he expected to be fired at the end of the year. The Jets defeated Cleveland, 24–13, and despite the uncertainty, the players and coaches were in high spirits. Several players including Antonio Cromartie, Calvin Pace, and Willie Colon went on to publicly express their support for Ryan to return as coach. In the season finale, the Jets defeated the Miami Dolphins 20–7, eliminating them from playoff contention. In the locker room after the game, owner Woody Johnson and Idzik announced Ryan would return for the 2014 season much to the delight of the players. Ryan was praised for keeping his team competitive after being eliminated from playoff contention and keeping their spirits high throughout the year despite their inconsistency.

==== 2014 season ====
The Jets opened the 2014 season with a 19–14 win over the Oakland Raiders but proceeded to lose their next eight games. Geno Smith, who started the year at quarterback, was replaced by veteran Michael Vick midway through the season. Vick helped to snap the losing streak in a Week 10 win over the Pittsburgh Steelers. Despite the victory, Ryan was seen cursing at an unidentified person and was subsequently fined $100,000 by the league. The team continued to struggle with Smith eventually being reinserted into the lineup. The Jets went on to win two of their last three games to finish with a 4–12 record, their worst finish under Ryan. Despite players again expressing their desire for Ryan to remain the coach, he was dismissed on December 29, 2014. Through the 2025 season, Ryan remains the last Jets head coach to qualify for the playoffs, as they have gone through 4 different head coaches since, none of whom made the playoffs during their Jets tenure.

=== Buffalo Bills ===
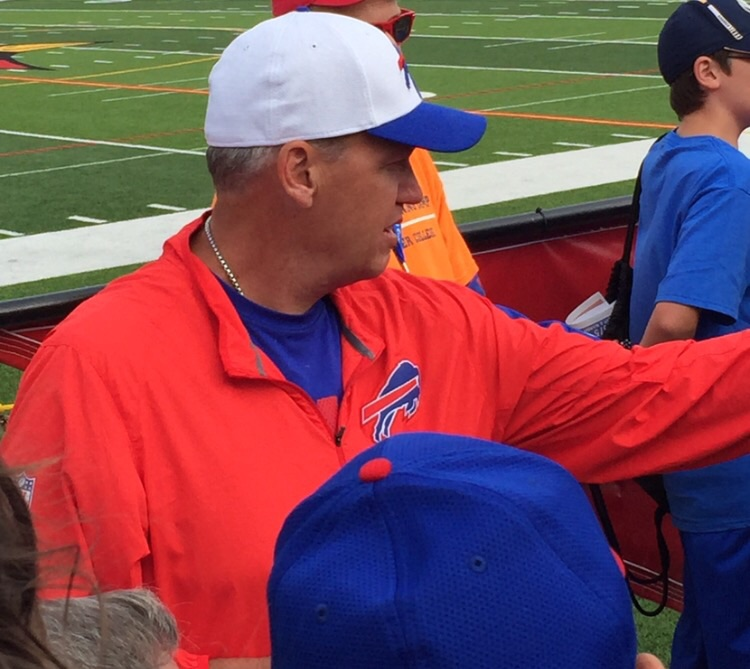
Ryan at Bills training camp in August 2015

Ryan was hired as the 18th head coach of the Buffalo Bills on January 12, 2015, agreeing to a five-year, $27.5 million contract.

==== 2015 season ====
The Bills opened the 2015 season with a 27–14 win over the Indianapolis Colts. Frustrated by the Bills leading the NFL in penalties heading into their Week 5 game against the Tennessee Titans, Ryan gave the entire team wristbands with the message "Yes sir". These were the only words he wanted his players to use with officials if they were flagged. After being flagged 17 times in Week 4 loss against the New York Giants, the Bills were penalized only seven times in their 14–13 victory over the Titans. The Bills entered their bye week with a 3–4 record after losing in London to the Jacksonville Jaguars.

Ryan gave the whole team the week off during the bye, and he himself found a secluded beach to "get away and focus". The Bills came out of their bye week and defeated the Miami Dolphins by a score of 33–17, improving their season record to 4–4. Ryan is now 2–5 all time following a bye week. Ryan returned to MetLife Stadium in Week 10 for a much anticipated Thursday Night Football game against the Jets. The Bills won the game by a score of 22–17, and improved to 5–4 on the season. Ryan faced questions before and after the game about his decision to name IK Enemkpali, who had been released by the Jets in preseason after breaking quarterback Geno Smith's jaw in an altercation, as Buffalo's captain for the game.

The Bills were unable to make the playoffs in their first season with Ryan as coach, as they were eliminated in Week 15 with a 35–25 loss to the Washington Redskins on December 20, extending their drought to 16 seasons, the NFL's longest active drought. They finished the season with an 8–8 record.

==== 2016 season ====
On January 10, 2016, it was announced that Ryan had hired his twin brother, Rob, to the Bills coaching staff. Rob served as an assistant head coach and also worked with the defense. Three days later, Ryan hired former NFL standout Ed Reed to be an assistant defensive backs coach.

The Bills opened the 2016 season with a 13–7 loss against the Baltimore Ravens. On September 16, 2016, less than 24 hours after losing 37–31 to the Jets in their home opener and falling to 0–2, Ryan fired offensive coordinator Greg Roman and promoted running backs coach Anthony Lynn to offensive coordinator.

On December 27, after a Christmas Eve loss to the Miami Dolphins in Week 16 that eliminated the team from playoff contention, Ryan was relieved of his duties as head coach, and offensive coordinator Anthony Lynn was named as interim head coach for the final game of the season. Rob Ryan was dismissed as well. Many players were unable to thrive under Ryan's defensive scheme, which was described as complicated. The Bills' defense finished the 2016 season 15th in points allowed and 24th in rushing yards allowed. Following the season, Ryan went on a profane tirade against the team for allegedly quitting on him.

Ryan was replaced on a full-time basis by Sean McDermott in Buffalo, who proceeded to lead the Bills to the postseason in his first season in 2017.

== Television career ==
Following his dismissal by the Bills In 2016, Ryan signed an agreement with ESPN to provide analysis for the network's Super Bowl LI pregame and postgame shows. The one-game agreement, in which ESPN beat out game rightsholder Fox (as well as CBS and NFL Network), left the possibility open for Ryan to continue with ESPN through the 2017 season. In April, it was announced that Ryan would officially join ESPN's Sunday NFL Countdown as an analyst. In 2022, Ryan competed on the thirty-fourth season of the CBS reality competition show The Amazing Race, where he was eliminated in the second leg.

== Coaching philosophy ==
Ryan stresses that coaches are essentially supposed to be open and communicative with the players and management, who in turn will reciprocate the same attitude. By connecting with his associates, Ryan states, it's "valuable when it comes to figuring out how to motivate somebody (...) because I want that guy to fight for me, just like I want to fight for him." Fullback Tony Richardson, in an interview, stated Ryan "loves his football team, loves his players" and does as much as he possibly can to ensure their success. Despite his boisterous and brash comments that have caused increased media coverage of the team, Ryan has taken the attention and has managed to "[put] it on himself" so the players can focus on their tasks. Ryan has also stressed that the teaching process is an important one, particularly when it comes to providing a player information and building chemistry. However, there has to be flexibility as the process must also be insightful and positive. Ryan states that coaches are responsible for providing players with information that is vitally important otherwise "if you emphasize everything, you've emphasized nothing."

=== Coaching strategy ===
With extensive knowledge regarding the intricacies of the defense, Ryan has been criticized for not devoting similar time and effort into coaching the offense. Ryan refuted this, stating his goal is to implement a proficient running game, citing a desire to "get after" the opponent through running the ball. Ryan has also stated that passing the ball is important but should not be used incessantly as there should be a balance between both aspects of the offense. In 2009 and 2010, the Jets were ranked first and fourth overall in the league in rushing which coincided with their two playoff appearances. In 2011, the Jets attempted to convert to a more pass-oriented offense, which have become more widely used in the NFL, however, the team struggled with this adjustment and reverted to their former run-oriented offense by the middle of the season. His defensive strategy, in contrast, tends to be more elaborate taking into consideration his experience in the field. There are six different defensive formations utilized in football, but the two commonly used formations are the 3–4 formation, with three defensive lineman and four linebackers, and the 4–3 formation, with four defensive lineman and three linebackers. The Jets utilized the former of the two popular formations; however, Ryan tended to employ all six formations in varying forms. Furthermore, he often calls audibles that have the defense line up in one formation and switch to another so as to cloak their intentions and confuse and pressure the opponent.

As a testament to this philosophy, Ryan is often willing to defer the coin toss to the opponent so his team can begin the game playing on defense in order to "set the tone" and generate turnovers. This concept has been criticized by ESPN reporter John Clayton, who has found the method to be ineffective league-wide. Mark Kriegel, an analyst for the NFL Network, found that between 2005 and 2012, during his tenure with both the Ravens and Jets, Ryan's defenses have never been ranked lower than sixth overall in the NFL and have allowed an average of 281 yards per game from scrimmage, second to Dick LeBeau's 277.4 yards per game. LeBeau is generally regarded as one of the best defensive coordinators in the history of the NFL.

== Personal life ==
Ryan and his wife, Michelle, met at Southwestern Oklahoma State. When Rex accepted his position as a graduate assistant at Eastern Kentucky, he proposed to Michelle by phone; she accepted and they were married in 1987. They have two sons, Seth, an assistant for the Detroit Lions, and Payton. Ryan earned a Bachelor of Science and a Master's degree in physical education from Eastern Kentucky University. He resided in Summit, New Jersey, during his tenure with the Jets.

=== Health ===
Ryan publicly announced in 2009 that he had been battling dyslexia for his entire life. During his early years, Ryan struggled to read and write in school; however, he was not formally diagnosed until testing confirmed he had the disorder in 2007. Ryan utilized color-coded playbooks and game plans as a coach to aid his comprehension.

Ryan underwent lap-band surgery at NYU Medical Center in March 2010 in an effort to battle his obesity. Ryan also had a hernia repaired during the procedure. He was able to return to his home that same day to recover. Following a three-week period, he had lost 40 pounds and as of July 2012, Ryan had lost 106 pounds.

On September 13, 2016, it was revealed that Ryan underwent a procedure to remove the lap band. He lost a total of 120 pounds during the 6-year span since he had the surgery.

=== Car crash ===
Ryan was involved in a three-car crash in eastern Pennsylvania on January 14, 2013. A witness said that Ryan's Ford Mustang was moving when a red light was present and collided with another driver which caused the unidentified driver to hit a third car. Ryan was issued a warning, but no citation.

=== Media ===
Ryan released Play Like You Mean It, an autobiography and a conversational about football strategy. The book, which was published by Doubleday in the spring of 2011, was co-written by Don Yaeger, a former Sports Illustrated editor who has co-authored the autobiographies of former NFL players Walter Payton and Warren Moon.

Ryan played a lawyer in Adam Sandler's film That's My Boy, which was released on June 15, 2012.

=== Internet video ===
In late 2010 as the Jets were preparing for the playoffs, a foot fetish video of a woman appearing to be Ryan's wife Michelle surfaced on various internet outlets. Judging by the video background, it appears to have been taken at the teachers parking lot at Whippany Park High School in New Jersey. The video features a clothed Michelle having her bare feet handled and commented on by an unseen camera operator with a voice similar to Rex's. The Jets released a press statement saying that Ryan and the organization considered the situation a private matter and would provide no comment. Multiple media reports soon linked the Ryans to a user profile named "ihaveprettyfeet" on a site for alternative sexual lifestyles, and more videos of Michelle emerged in the following months. In September 2015, a photo of Ryan surfaced showing him sitting at his desk with a framed photo of a person's feet behind him.

=== Sports allegiances ===
Ryan is an avid hockey fan and developed a notoriety of being a bandwagon jumper. Ryan admitted to being a fan of the Toronto Maple Leafs, as a result of growing up in the city, but upon taking the Jets head coaching job, he was often seen cheering for all three of the New York metropolitan area franchises. During the New Jersey Devils run to the 2012 Stanley Cup Final, Ryan was seen sporting the team's attire, and he was seen donning the attire of the New York Rangers two years later, during their run to the Stanley Cup Final. Outside of the playoff runs, Ryan performed a ceremonial puck drop at Nassau Veterans Memorial Coliseum on October 9, 2010, wearing a vintage New York Islanders Billy Smith jersey.

Ryan was known for a notorious incident at a Carolina Hurricanes game, as he attended the matchup with the Florida Panthers wearing a throwback Philadelphia Flyers jersey. Upon being recognized by the fans at the arena, the team's cheerleaders approached him with a Hurricanes alternate jersey sported by the team. The incident was noted as he was seen taking off the jersey and baring his chest for the crowd to see.

Upon taking the Buffalo Bills head coaching job, Ryan changed his allegiance to the Buffalo Sabres, and he was often seen at the team's home games and sporting the team's attire. Months after being fired by the Bills, Ryan would later be seen during the Nashville Predators run to the 2017 Stanley Cup Finals, wearing the team's jersey.

=== Political views ===
On April 18, 2016, Ryan introduced Republican presidential candidate front-runner Donald Trump at one of his rallies held at the First Niagara Center in Buffalo. Ryan had told the Associated Press he was supporting Chris Christie for the nomination, but when Christie dropped out of the race, Ryan endorsed Trump. During the rally, Ryan praised Trump's 'courage' to "say what's on his mind."

In September 2017, Ryan stated on ESPN that President Trump's comments about how NFL owners should fire players who kneel during the national anthem were "appalling to almost any citizen in our country, it should be. You know, calling our players, SOBs and all that kind of stuff, that's not the–that's not the men that I know. The men that I know in the locker room I'm proud of. I'm proud to be associated with those people. I apologized for being pissed off but guess what? That's it, because right away I'm associated with what Donald Trump stands for and all that because I introduced him. I never signed up for that, I never wanted that. That doesn't mean I support 100 percent of the things he says."

=== The Amazing Race ===
In 2022, Ryan competed on the 34th season of The Amazing Race with his golf buddy, Tim Mann. His team was the second to be eliminated in Innsbruck, Austria, and finished in 11th place.

=== Arrest ===
On November 11, 2026, Ryan was cited for running over the feet of two pedestrians while driving in Nashville, Tennessee. He later turned himself over to police, where he was charged for hit-and-run.

== Head coaching record ==
Team	Year	Regular season					Postseason			
Team	Year	Won	Lost	Ties	Win %	Finish	Won	Lost	Win %	Result
NYJ	2009	9	7	0	.563	2nd in AFC East	2	1	.667	Lost to Indianapolis Colts in AFC Championship Game
NYJ	2010	11	5	0	.688	2nd in AFC East	2	1	.667	Lost to Pittsburgh Steelers in AFC Championship Game
NYJ	2011	8	8	0	.500	2nd in AFC East	—	—	—	—
NYJ	2012	6	10	0	.375	3rd in AFC East	—	—	—	—
NYJ	2013	8	8	0	.500	2nd in AFC East	—	—	—	—
NYJ	2014	4	12	0	.250	4th in AFC East	—	—	—	—
NYJ total		46	50	0	.479		4	2	.667	
BUF	2015	8	8	0	.500	3rd in AFC East	—	—	—	—
BUF	2016	7	8	0	.467	Fired	—	—	—	—
BUF total		15	16	0	.484		0	0	.000	
Total		61	66	0	.480		4	2	.667	

== Bibliography ==
- Ryan, Rex; Don Yaeger (2011). Play Like You Mean It: Passion, Laughs, and Leadership In the World's Most Beautiful Game. New York, New York: Doubleday. ISBN 978-0-385-53444-4.
