= Joel Heinen =

American environmentalist and author (born 1958)

Joel Thomas Heinen
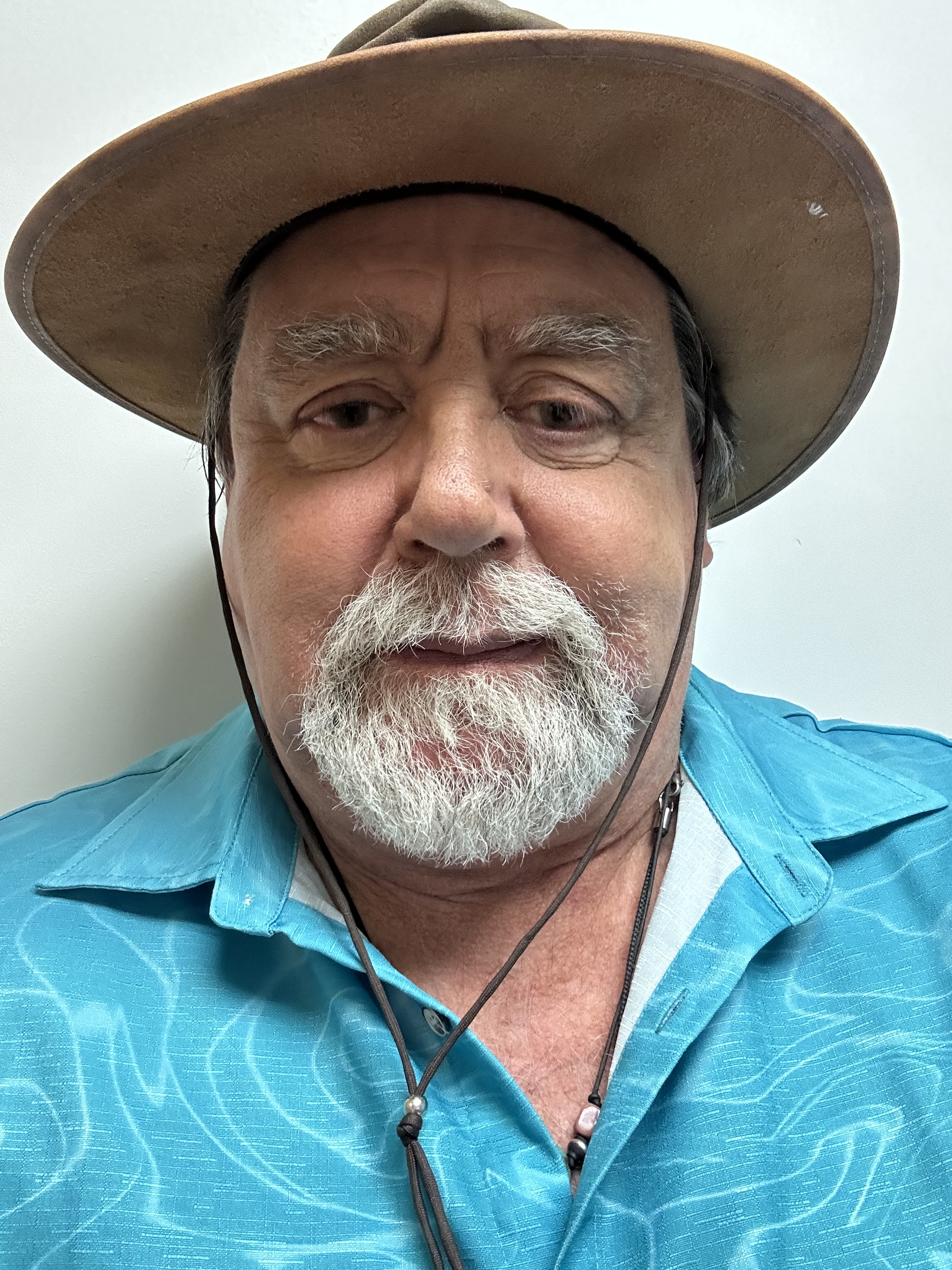
- Born: March 9, 1958 (age 68); Buffalo, New York
- Occupations: Environmentalist, author and academic

Academic background
- Education: B.S. Natural Resources; M.S. Resource Management, Remote Sensing; M.S. Behavioral and Community Ecology; PhD Resource Ecology and Management
- Alma mater: The University of Michigan; Virginia Tech; Ohio State University
- Thesis: Behavioral anti-predator strategies in newly-metamorphosed American toads (Bufo americanus) in response to predation risk by Eastern garter snakes (Thamnophis sirtalis) (1992)

Joel Thomas Heinen (born March 9, 1958) is an American environmentalist, academic, and author. He is a professor in the Department of Earth and Environment at Florida International University (FIU).

Heinen's primary research areas center on biodiversity conservation policy and biological resources management strategies. He had served on the Interdisciplinary Committee of the World Cultural Council for many years.

== Early life and education ==
Heinen was born in Buffalo NY and raised in Hamburg NY. He graduated from Frontier Central High School in 1976 and received his BS from the University of Michigan in 1979, MS from Virginia Tech in 1982, MS from Ohio State in 1984, and PhD from Michigan's School of Natural Resources and Environment (now School of Environment and Sustainability) in 1992. As a graduate student at Michigan, Heinen was awarded a 1990 Tropical Biology Fellowship to pursue an Organization for Tropical Studies course in Costa Rica and Rackham Predoctoral and Rackham One Term Fellowships in 1991 and 1992. His degrees have spanned studies in resource policy and management to vertebrate ecology and animal behavior.

== Career ==
Heinen served as a Peace Corps Volunteer in Nepal from 1984 to 1988 where he was a lecturer at the Institute of Forestry in Hetauda and Pokhara and researcher with the Department of National Parks and Wildlife Conservation in Koshi Tappu Wildlife Reserve where he conducted studies on Asian wild buffalo and wildlife-human conflicts. He is a long-time member of IUCN’s Species Survival Commission and previously served on the United States National Ramsar Convention Committee. While he was a graduate student at Michigan, Heinen developed research on human behavioral ecology applied to solving environmental conservation issues with his PhD advisor (Bobbi S. Low), and he has conducted many studies over the years on awareness and attitudes of local people toward wildlife and protected areas, as well as on conservation policy implementation at national and subnational levels.

Heinen was awarded two Fulbright Scholarships: the first to International University of Kyrgyzstan from 1999 to 2000 and the second to Makerere University, Uganda from 2021 to 2022. He was also awarded a Visiting Fellowship in Asia-Pacific Regional Cooperation from the East-West Center, Honolulu in 2000. Since 1993, he has been on the faculty of Florida International University where he was promoted to Professor in 2008.

== Research ==
Heinen's primary research areas center around biodiversity conservation policy and biological resources management strategies. His analysis revealed that Kosi Tappu Wildlife Reserve, crucial for biodiversity, faced local resistance due to factors such as caste, literacy rate, and socio-economic conflict. He investigated the impact of conservation models in Nepal as well, revealing enhanced attitudes with social and economic interventions around protected areas. His study on Nepal's Community-based conservation (CBC) impact showed positive changes in conservation attitudes influenced by training, tourism, wildlife concerns, and education, indicating the approach's potential to shape favorable attitudes. He also examined the progression of Nepal's conservation areas by delving into the 1996 Conservation Area Management Regulations, shedding light on concerns regarding power dynamics with proposed solutions including improved cross-sectoral coordination within the government.

Heinen conducted research in the Western Terai of Nepal, studying Shorea robusta forests and identifying factors influencing their distinct community types based on historical disturbances. Furthermore, he compared herpetofauna in three forest stands at La Selva Biological Station, Costa Rica, highlighting how recently disturbed sites exhibit greater abundance but lower diversity compared to less recently disturbed sites.

== Awards and honors ==
- 1997 – Teaching Incentive Program Award, Florida International University
- 1999 – 2000 Fulbright Scholar, International University of Kyrgyzstan
- 2000 – Visiting Fellowship in Asia-Pacific Regional Cooperation, East-West Center
- 2001 – Matriculation Merit Award, Florida International University
- 2001 – Provost's Office Faculty Research Award, Florida International University
- 2021 – 2022 Fulbright Scholar, Makerere University

== Personal life ==
Heinen is an agnostic secular humanist who wrote the 2018 satirical book Say What? Irreverent Essays of a Bemused Atheist, which explored the diverse and contradictory nature of religions, delving into beliefs, sects, and historical developments, drawing parallels between religion and global suffering. Manuel Gutierrez, in an article for AFV News, wrote that the author "indiscriminately tears apart theistic epistemologies to the point beyond resurrection and reduces them to the farce that they truly are." Heinen is also a hobbyist singer/songwriter who served as board member and past president of the Folk Club of South Florida, now the Folk and Acoustic Music Club of South Florida.

== Bibliography ==
=== Books ===
- Say What?: Irreverent Essays of a Bemused Atheist (2018) ISBN 978-1642988109

=== Selected articles ===
- Heinen, J. T. (1992). Comparisons of the leaf litter herpetofauna in abandoned cacao plantations and primary rain forest in Costa Rica: some implications for faunal restoration. Biotropica, 431–439.
- Heinen, J. T. (1993). Park–people relations in Kosi Tappu Wildlife Reserve, Nepal: a socio-economic analysis. Environmental conservation, 20(1), 25–34.
- Mehta, J. N., & Heinen, J. T. (2001). Does community-based conservation shape favorable attitudes among locals? An empirical study from Nepal. Environmental management, 28, 165–177.
- Timilsina, N., Ross, M. S., & Heinen, J. T. (2007). A community analysis of sal (Shorea robusta) forests in the western Terai of Nepal. Forest Ecology and Management, 241(1–3), 223–234.
- Baral, N., & Heinen, J. T. (2007). Resources use, conservation attitudes, management intervention and park-people relations in the Western Terai landscape of Nepal. Environmental conservation, 34(1), 64–72.
