= Hamburg High School (Hamburg, New York) =

Coordinates: 42.7273°N 78.8304°W

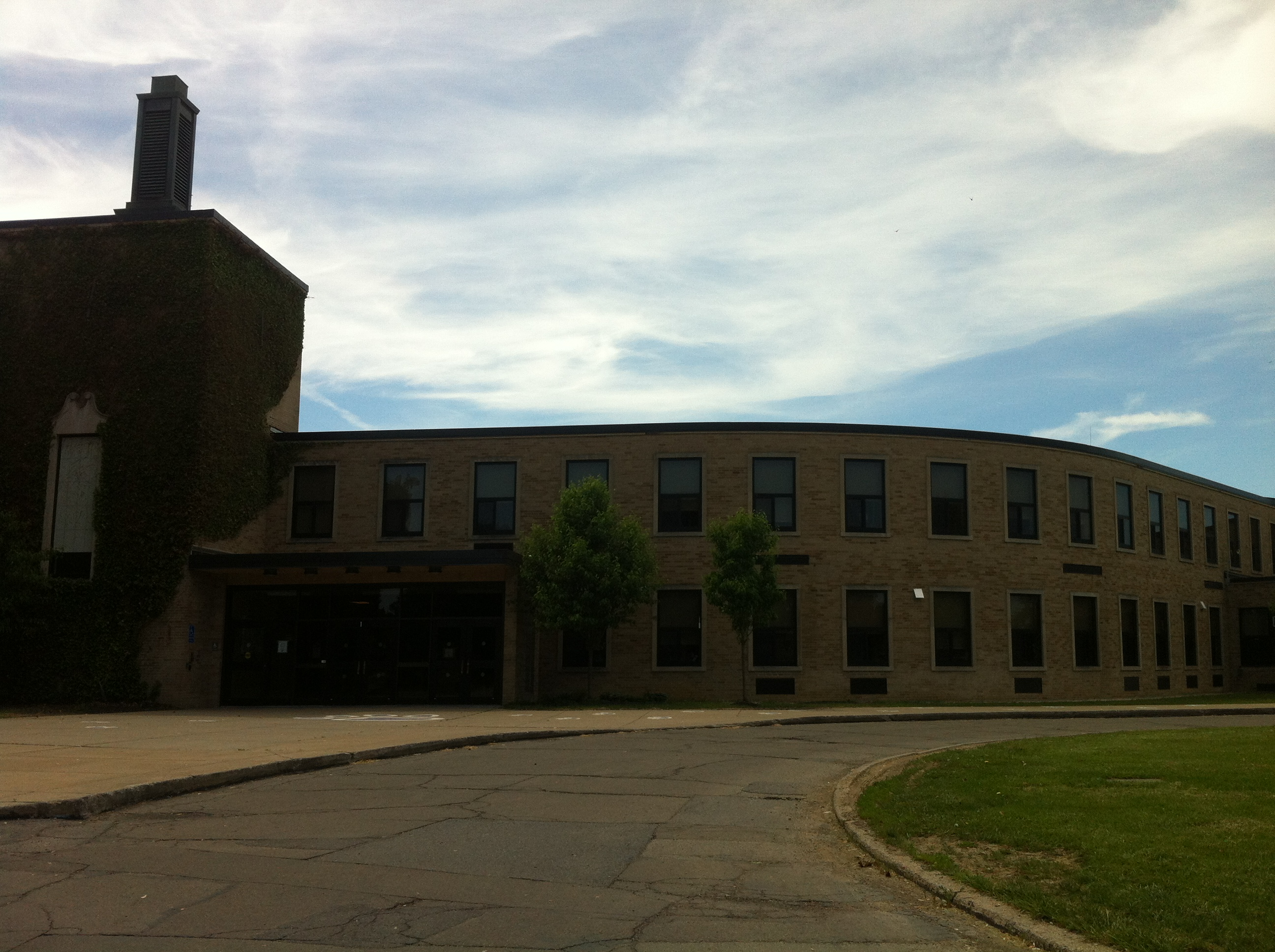

Location
- 4111 Legion Drive; Hamburg, New York; United States

Information
- Type: Public
- Motto: Inspiring today. Empowering Tomorrow.
- School district: Hamburg Central School District
- Principal: Jon Macswan
- Assistant Principals: Molly Hanzly; Kelley Mason
- Teaching staff: 83.00 (FTE)
- Enrollment: 996 (2025-2026)
- Student to teacher ratio: 12.00
- Color
- Mascot: Bulldog
- Website: Hamburg High School

Hamburg High School is a public secondary school in Hamburg, Erie County, New York, United States. The school has 996 students in grades 9–12 as of the 2024–2025 school year. The mascot of Hamburg High School is the bulldog, and the school colors are purple and white. Their chief athletic rivals are the cross-town Frontier Falcons, Orchard Park Quakers, and Lake Shore Eagles.

== Academics ==
Hamburg High School offers 171 academic courses, 16 of which are Advanced Placement (AP) classes. The school is also a member of Erie 1 BOCES, and as such offers a number of career and technical education courses.

== History ==
=== Former Principals ===
Previous assignment and reason for departure denoted in parentheses

- Byron Heath
- Ford R. Park
- Albert H. Downey–1909–1918 (Principal – Williamsville High School, named Principal of Waterloo High School)
- Frank N. Zurbick–1918–1926
- Vernon Simmons–1926–1940 (History teacher – Hamburg High School, resigned)
- Leon E. Leader–1940–1946
- Spencer W. Ravel–1940–1972 (unknown, retired)
- Lawrence S. Hood–1972–1998 (Assistant Principal – Westhill Junior-Senior High School, retired)
- Jean M. Kovach–1998–2000 (Assistant Principal – West Seneca East High School, named Director of Instruction of Hamburg Central School District)
- Jacqueline K. Peffer–2000–2005 (Principal – Middleport Elementary School, named Principal of Union Pleasant Elementary School)
- Michael J. Gallagher–2005–2021 (Principal – North Collins Junior/Senior High School, retired)

== Notable alumni ==
- Kathy Hochul, governor of New York
- George Abbott, Broadway producer
- Rosemary Barnsdall Blackmon, writer and magazine editor
- E. Howard Hunt, author, CIA officer, member of the White House Plumbers, organizer of the Watergate burglary
- Howard J. Osborn, former CIA director of security
- Alison Pipitone singer songwriter, and guitarist
- Tom Toles, Pulitzer Prize-winning political cartoonist for The Washington Post.
