= Frontier Central High School =

Coordinates: 42°46′0.5″N 78°49′52.5″W

Location
- 4432 Bayview Road; Hamburg, New York 14075; United States

Information
- Type: Comprehensive public high school
- Motto: Working Together for Excellence
- Established: 1954
- School district: Frontier Central High School
- CEEB code: 330505
- NCES School ID: 361167000925
- Principal: Daniel A. Charland
- Faculty: 118.28 on FTE basis (as of 2023–2024)
- Grades: 9–12
- Gender: Coeducational
- Student to teacher ratio: 11.06
- Language: English
- Campus size: 112 acres
- Campus type: Suburban
- Colors: Blue and white
- Athletics conference: Section 6 (NYSPHSAA)
- Mascot: Falcon
- Team name: Frontier Falcons
- Rival: Hamburg High School
- Accreditations: New York State Board of Regents
- Newspaper: Inflight
- Yearbook: Gateway
- Communities served: Town of Hamburg
- Website: www.frontiercsd.org

Frontier Central High School is a high school located in Hamburg, New York. A part of the Frontier Central School District, the school teaches students from grades 9-12. The principal is Daniel Charland, and the assistant principals are David Smaczniak, James Helmicki, and Shannon Thurston.

The high school is located in the Southtowns of Western New York. It had an enrollment of 1,882 students in the 2016-17 school year. According to a 2017 Niche Survey, it is the 4th largest school in Western New York. The athletic mascot is a falcon.

== History ==
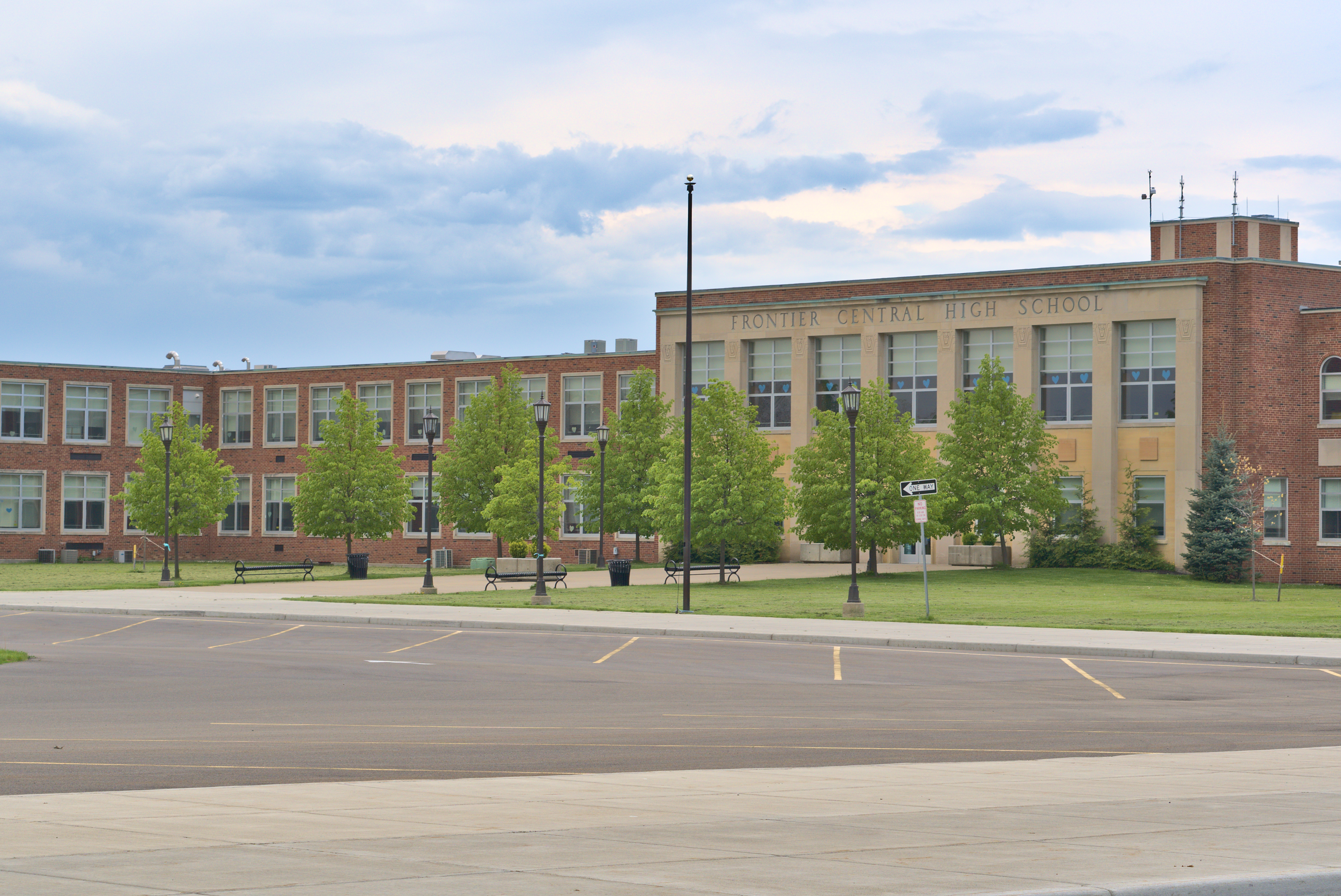
Front entranceway and bus circle

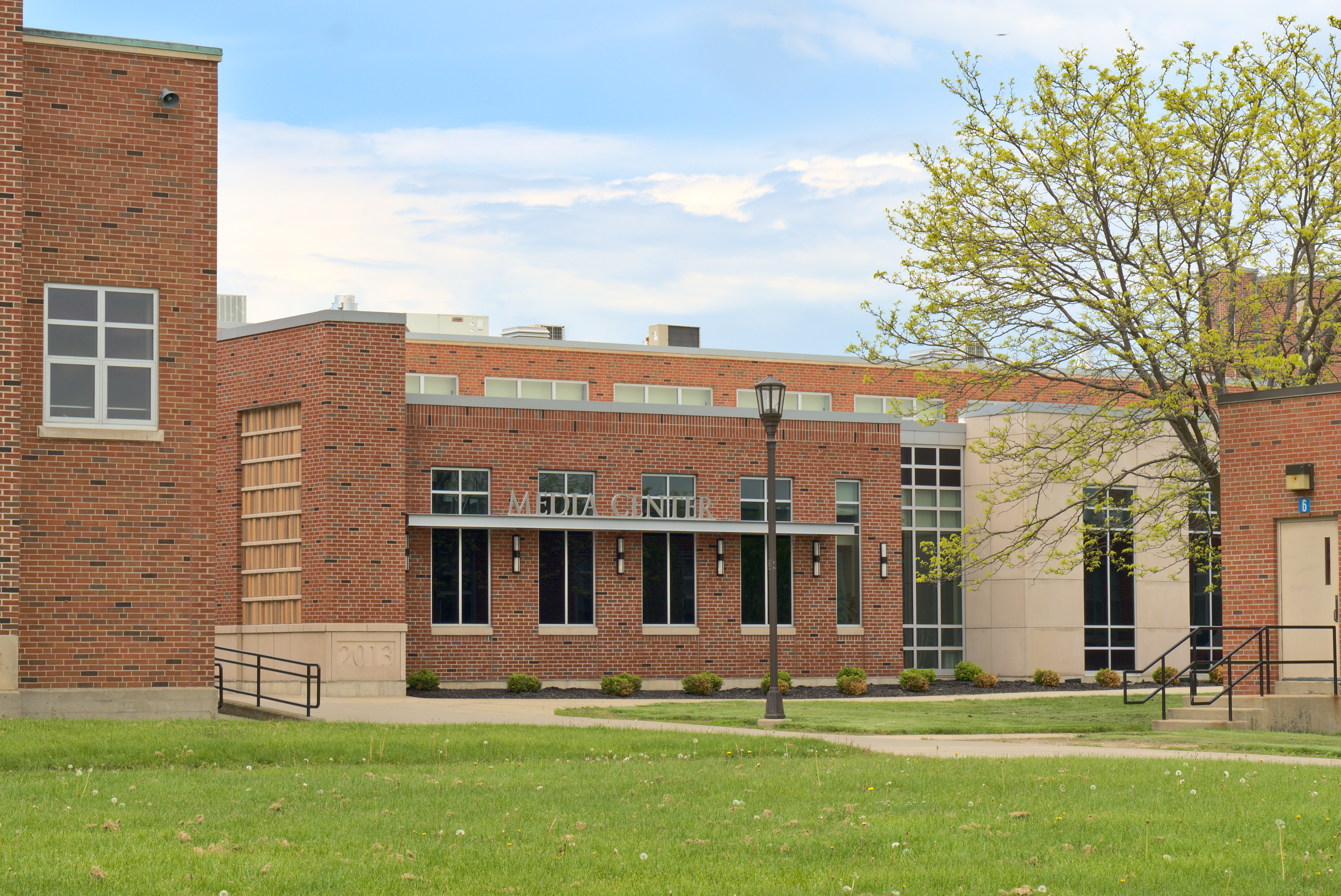
Library Media Center

Frontier High School was built in 1954 and opened on September 7, 1955, replacing the former Blasdell High School. It was dedicated on April 15, 1956.

The high school has expanded three times. The first expansion was in the early 1990s with an eight-room foreign language education wing. The second expansion was in 1998 with 23 classrooms. The third expansion was in 2013, with the addition of a new library media center and secured vestibule. The renovations were completed in 2014.

=== Notable alumni ===
- Joel Heinen, professor at Florida International University, Miami, environmentalist and author.
- Joe Hesketh, a former pitcher for the Montreal Expos, Atlanta Braves and Boston Red Sox
- Jacob Schum, punter for the Green Bay Packers.
- Dave Wohlabaugh, a former center for the New England Patriots, Cleveland Browns and St. Louis Rams,
- Ron Wolfley, a former fullback for the West Virginia Mountaineers and Arizona Cardinals,
