= Dave Wohlabaugh =

American football player (born 1972)

No. 64
- Position: Center

Personal information
- Born: April 13, 1972 (age 54); Hamburg, New York, U.S.
- Listed height: 6 ft 3 in (1.91 m)
- Listed weight: 296 lb (134 kg)

Career information
- High school: Frontier (Hamburg)
- College: Syracuse (1990–1994)
- NFL draft: 1995: 4th round, 112th overall pick

Career history
- New England Patriots (1995–1998); Cleveland Browns (1999–2002); St. Louis Rams (2003)

Awards and highlights
- PFWA All-Rookie Team (1995); New England Patriots All-1990s Team

Career NFL statistics
- Games played: 128
- Games started: 128
- Fumble recoveries: 5
- Stats at Pro Football Reference

David Vincent Wohlabaugh (born April 13, 1972) is an American former professional football player who was a center for nine seasons in the National Football League (NFL). He played college football for the Syracuse Orange. Wohlabaugh was selected 112th overall in the fourth round of the 1995 NFL draft. He started in Super Bowl XXXI for the New England Patriots. Following the 1998 season, Wohlabaugh signed a 7-year contract with the expansion Cleveland Browns worth $26.25 million. At the time, this made Wohlabaugh the highest-paid center in NFL history. He also played for the St. Louis Rams.
