= Rosemary Barnsdall Blackmon =

American editor

- Rosemary Barnsdall Blackmon, from a 1959 magazine
- Born: September 26, 1921; Buffalo, New York, US
- Died: October 9, 1983; Provence, France
- Occupation: Editor
- Known for: managing editor, Vogue (1962-1973); editor, Harper's Bazaar (1973-1978)

Rosemary Barnsdall Blackmon (September 26, 1921 – October 9, 1983) was an American writer and magazine editor.

== Early life ==
Rosemary Barnsdall was born in Buffalo, New York as a daughter of Jay Thornton Barnsdall Jr. and Grace L. Devine Barnsdall. Her father was a lawyer. She graduated from Hamburg High School in 1939, and from Barnard College in 1943, where she majored in Latin and Greek, and was the president of the Classical Club.

== Career ==
Blackmon worked in editorial and writing jobs after college. Her Latin and Greek degree from Barnard helped her find a job with the American College Dictionary, and that work in turn introduced her to Wilfred J. Funk, with whom she worked on Word Origins and Their Romantic Stories (1950). After her children were born, she returned to editing work, saying "I'm not really domestic and I have no talent for children." She collaborated with photographer Irving Penn and publisher Alexander Liberman on Moments Preserved (1960).

Blackmon was managing editor of Vogue from 1962 to 1973, and wrote regularly for the magazine for a longer period, with titles like "I Went to the Fair" (1958), about the Expo 58 in Brussels, "The Maugham Explosion at Sotheby's" (1962), "New Japan" (1964), and "What Can Hypnosis Do for You" (1969). William Safire suggested Blackmon may have coined the phrase "beautiful people" at Vogue. She was an editor at Harper's Bazaar from 1973 to 1978.

== Personal life and legacy ==
In 1945, Rosemary Barnsdall married William A. Blackmon Jr. They had children, Rosemary and William. She died in 1983, aged 62 years, in Provence. A Claire McCardell wool dress and a linen shift dress by B. H. Wragge, both worn by Blackmon, are in the collection of the Museum of the City of New York.
