= Markus Zusevics =

American football player (born 1989)

Profile
- Position: Offensive tackle

Personal information
- Born: April 25, 1989 (age 37)
- Listed height: 6 ft 5 in (1.96 m)
- Listed weight: 300 lb (136 kg)

Career information
- College: Iowa
- NFL draft: 2012: undrafted

Career history
- New England Patriots (2012–2013); New York Jets (2014)*
- * Offseason or practice squad member only
- Stats at Pro Football Reference

Markus Zusevics (Latvian: Markus Zuševics; born April 25, 1989) is an American former football offensive tackle. He played college football for Iowa from 2009 to 2011. He is of Latvian descent.

== Early life ==
Zusevics graduated from Prospect High School in Illinois in 2007.

== Professional career ==
While bench pressing for the NFL Scouting Combine on February 24, 2012, Zusevics tore a pectoral muscle and missed most of the Combine workouts.

On May 10, 2012, he was signed as an undrafted free agent by the New England Patriots. On August 26, 2013, he was placed on the injured reserve list and missed the rest of the 2013 season.

Zusevics was signed by the New York Jets on May 19, 2014, after trying out for the team during rookie minicamp. He was released on August 23, 2014.
