= Jeff Cumberland =

American football player (born 1987)

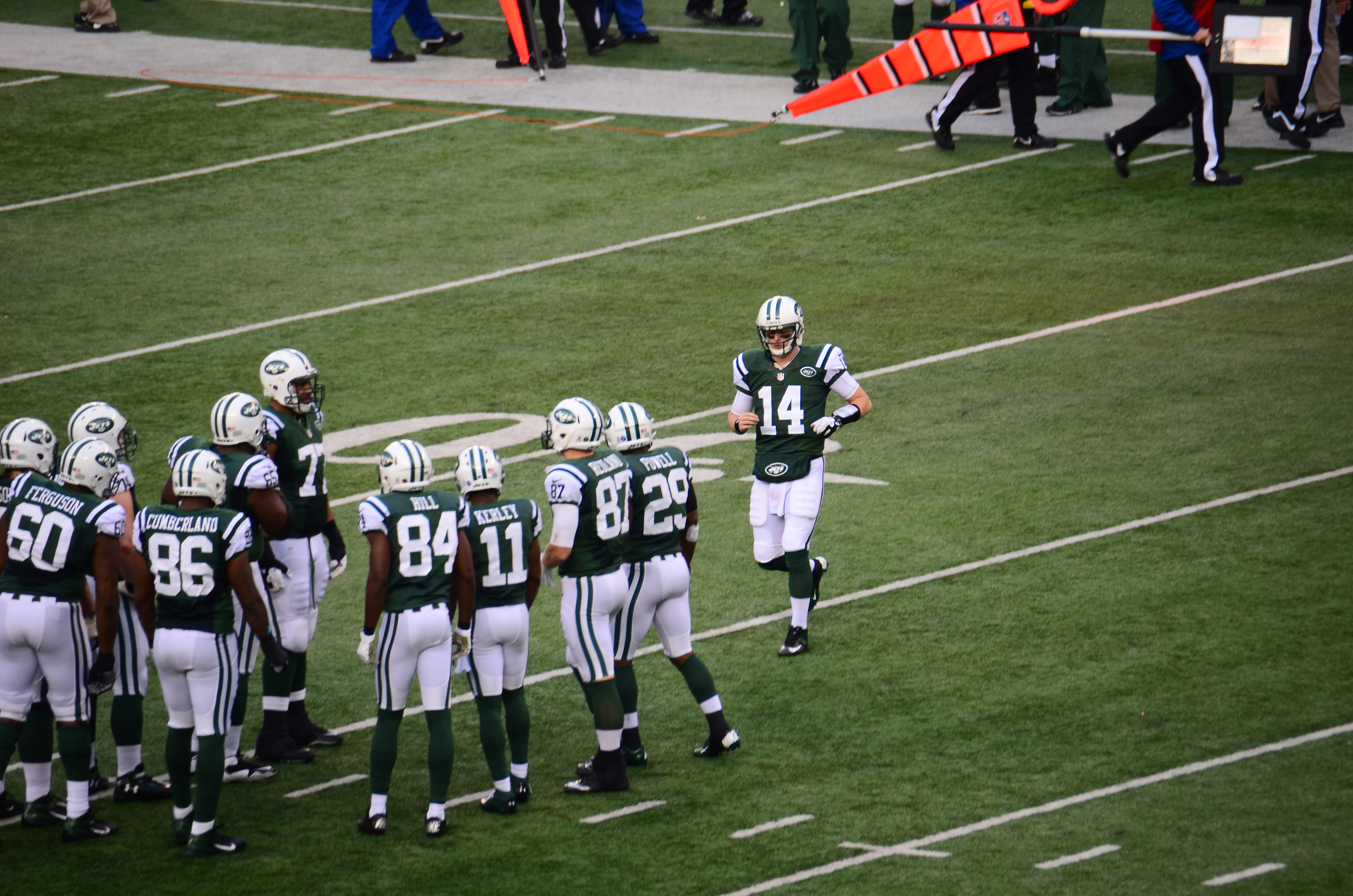
- Cumberland, left (86) with the Jets in 2012

No. 86, 87, 85
- Position: Tight end

Personal information
- Born: May 2, 1987 (age 39); Columbus, Ohio, U.S.
- Listed height: 6 ft 4 in (1.93 m)
- Listed weight: 249 lb (113 kg)

Career information
- High school: Brookhaven (Columbus)
- College: Illinois (2006–2009)
- NFL draft: 2010: undrafted

Career history
- New York Jets (2010–2015); San Diego / Los Angeles Chargers (2016–2017)

Career NFL statistics
- Receptions: 88
- Receiving yards: 1,121
- Receiving touchdowns: 10
- Stats at Pro Football Reference

Jeffrey Lionell Cumberland (born May 2, 1987) is an American former professional football player who was a tight end in the National Football League (NFL). He played college football for the Illinois Fighting Illini and was signed as an undrafted free agent by the New York Jets in 2010.

== Early life ==
Cumberland was selected to the Ohio News Network/Ohio High Magazine All-Ohio team. He was an PrepStar All-American in high school. He was ranked as the 11th-best prospect from the state of Ohio.

== College career ==
In 2006, Cumberland was selected as an honorable mention freshman All-America by The Sporting News. He played for the University of Illinois Urbana-Champaign.

== Professional career ==
Pre-draft measurables
Height	Weight	40-yard dash	10-yard split	20-yard split	20-yard shuttle	Three-cone drill	Vertical jump	Broad jump	Bench press
6 ft 4 in (1.93 m)	249 lb (113 kg)	4.45 s	1.54 s	2.61 s	4.789 s	6.89 s	35 1/2 in (0.90 m)	9 ft 10 in (3.00 m)	20 reps
All values from Pro Day

=== New York Jets ===
Cumberland went undrafted and would later sign with the New York Jets. He only appeared in one game during his rookie season in 2010 and caught one pass for three yards.

Cumberland made his NFL debut against the Buffalo Bills on January 2, 2011. Cumberland suffered a torn achilles tendon on September 25, 2011 against the Oakland Raiders. He was placed on the injured reserve list the following day. In the 2011 season, he appeared in three games and had two receptions for 35 yards on the season.

In the 2012 season, Cumberland appeared in 15 games and recorded 29 receptions for 359 yards and three touchdowns.

In the 2013 season, Cumberland appeared in 15 games and recorded 26 receptions for 398 yards and a career-high four touchdowns.

Cumberland and the Jets agreed on a new three-year contract on March 7, 2014. In the 2014 season, he appeared in all 16 regular season games and recorded 23 receptions for 247 yards and three touchdowns.

In the 2015 season, Cumberland appeared in 15 games but only had five receptions for 77 yards.

On March 9, 2016, Cumberland was released by the Jets.

=== San Diego / Los Angeles Chargers ===
On April 4, 2016, Cumberland signed a one-year contract with the San Diego Chargers. He suffered a torn Achilles in the Chargers' second preseason game, ending his season.

On April 12, 2017, Cumberland re-signed with the Chargers on a one-year contract. He was released on September 2, 2017. He was re-signed on November 7, 2017.

== NFL career statistics ==
Year	Team	GP	Receiving				
Year	Team	GP	Rec	Yds	Avg	Lng	TD
2010	NYJ	1	1	3	3.0	3	0
2011	NYJ	3	2	35	17.5	33	0
2012	NYJ	15	29	359	12.4	39	3
2013	NYJ	15	26	398	15.3	47	4
2014	NYJ	16	23	247	10.7	28	3
2015	NYJ	15	5	77	15.4	44	0
2016	SD	0	Did not play due to injury				
2017	LAC	7	2	2	1.0	2	0
Total		72	88	1,121	12.7	47	10
