= Brandon Smith (defensive back, born 1987) =

American football player (born 1987)

No. 16
- Position: Cornerback

Personal information
- Born: February 23, 1987 (age 39); Bakersfield, California, U.S.
- Listed height: 6 ft 1 in (1.85 m)
- Listed weight: 210 lb (95 kg)

Career information
- College: Arizona State
- NFL draft: 2011: undrafted

Career history
- Carolina Panthers (2011)*; Seattle Seahawks (2011)*; Green Bay Packers (2013)*; Buffalo Bills (2013); New York Jets (2014)*; Buffalo Bills (2014)*; Dallas Cowboys (2015)*; BC Lions (2015)*; Montreal Alouettes (2015)
- * Offseason or practice squad member only
- Stats at Pro Football Reference

Brandon Eugene Smith (born February 23, 1987) is an American former professional football cornerback who played for the Buffalo Bills of the National Football League (NFL). He was signed as an undrafted free agent by the Carolina Panthers in 2011. He played college football at Arizona State.

== Professional career ==
Pre-draft measurables
Height	Weight	40-yard dash	10-yard split	20-yard split	20-yard shuttle	Three-cone drill	Vertical jump	Broad jump	Bench press
6 ft 1 in (1.85 m)	202 lb (92 kg)	4.39 s	1.50 s	2.53 s	4.01 s	6.71 s	40.0 in (1.02 m)	10 ft 3 in (3.12 m)	19 reps
All values from Pro Day

=== Carolina Panthers ===
On July 27, 2011, he signed with the Carolina Panthers as an undrafted free agent. On August 6, 2011, he was released.

=== Seattle Seahawks ===
On August 16, 2011, he signed with the Seattle Seahawks, and was released on August 29, 2011.

=== Green Bay Packers ===
On May 3, 2013, he signed with the Green Bay Packers. On August 31, 2013, he was released.

=== Buffalo Bills ===
On September 1, 2013, he signed with the Buffalo Bills to join practice squad.

=== New York Jets ===
Smith was signed to the New York Jets' practice squad on September 23, 2014. He was released on September 30, 2014.

=== BC Lions ===
Smith was signed to the BC Lions' practice roster on October 6, 2015. He was released by the Lions on October 9, 2015.

=== Montreal Alouettes ===
Smith was claimed by the Montreal Alouettes on October 10, 2015. He played in one game for the Alouettes in 2015.

He participated in The Spring League in 2017.
