= Jake Schum =

American football player (born 1989)

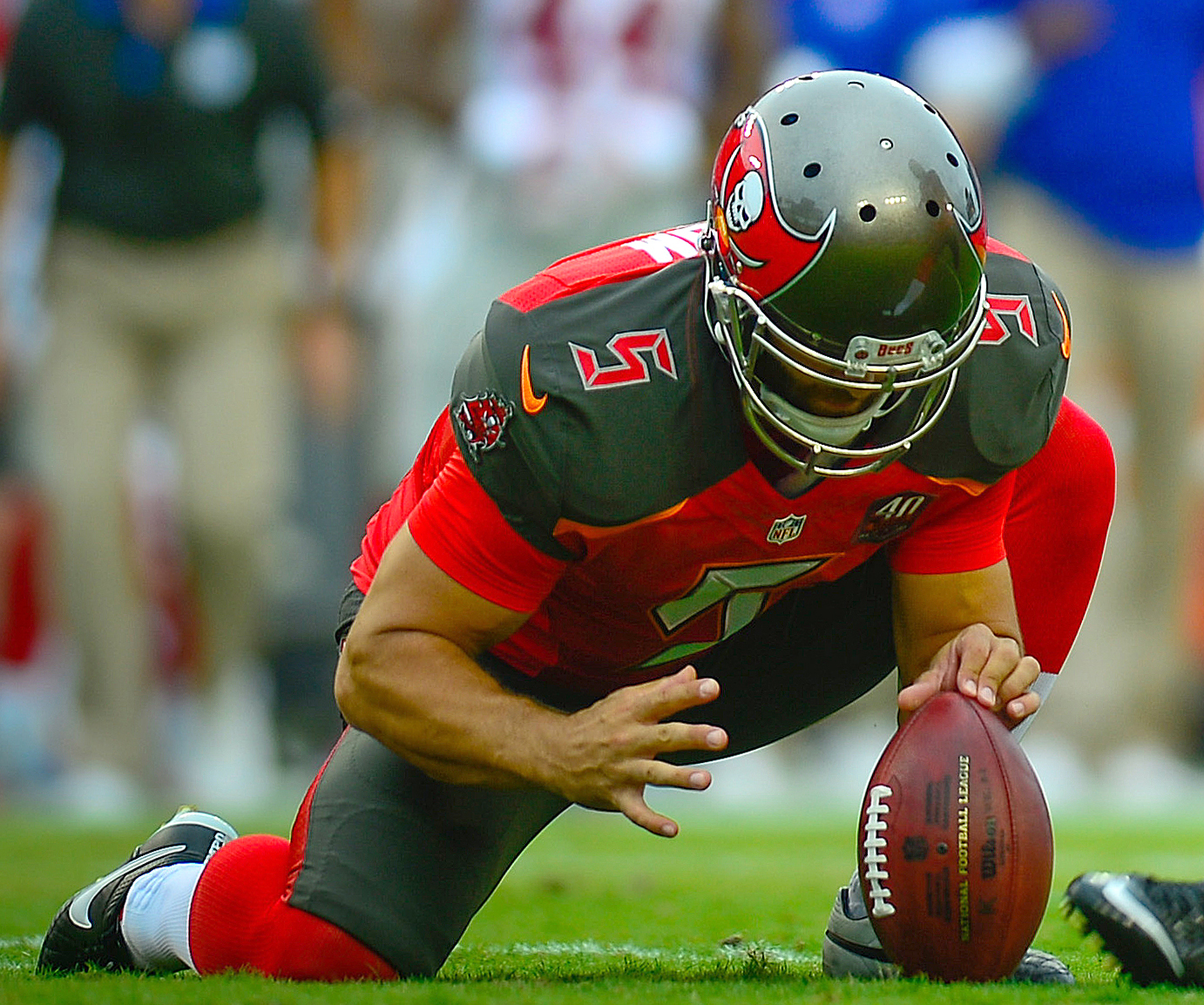
- Schum with the Tampa Bay Buccaneers in 2015

No. 5, 10
- Position: Punter

Personal information
- Born: January 21, 1989 (age 37); Hamburg, New York, U.S.
- Listed height: 5 ft 11 in (1.80 m)
- Listed weight: 211 lb (96 kg)

Career information
- High school: Frontier (Hamburg)
- College: Buffalo
- NFL draft: 2012: undrafted

Career history
- Cleveland Browns (2013)*; Tampa Bay Buccaneers (2014)*; New York Jets (2014)*; Tampa Bay Buccaneers (2014)*; New York Jets (2015)*; Tampa Bay Buccaneers (2015); Green Bay Packers (2016–2017); Tampa Bay Vipers (2020); DC Defenders (2023)*
- * Offseason or practice squad member only

Career NFL statistics
- Punts: 112
- Punting yards: 4,768
- Average punt: 42.6
- Inside 20: 34
- Stats at Pro Football Reference

Jacob Schum (born January 21, 1989) is an American former professional football player who was a punter in the National Football League (NFL). He played college football for the Buffalo Bulls. Schum was signed by the Cleveland Browns as an undrafted free agent in 2013. He was also a member of the New York Jets, Tampa Bay Buccaneers, Green Bay Packers, Tampa Bay Vipers, and DC Defenders.

== Early life ==
Schum was born to Alan, a Hamburg, New York police officer, and Charlene Schum. Schum played football as a wide receiver and punter at Frontier High School in Hamburg.

== College career ==
Failing to attract the attention of any Division I college football programs, Schum committed to play for the Buffalo State Bengals. After one season, Schum attempted to transfer to the University at Buffalo but the Buffalo Bulls football coaches spurned his advances. Schum continued attending Buffalo State but withdrew from the football team, opting instead to focus on training.

Before his junior year, Schum transferred to Buffalo and walked on to the football team where he was only used as a wide receiver on the scout team under Turner Gill. In 2010, under new head coach Jeff Quinn, Schum was granted a tryout at punter and was named the team's starter in each of his final two years of athletic eligibility. He was eventually awarded a scholarship.

== Professional career ==
=== Cleveland Browns ===
After going undrafted in the 2012 NFL draft, Schum spent a year working odd jobs. He was selling gym memberships for the Buffalo Athletic Club in the spring of 2013 when he got a call from the Cleveland Browns, who had taken an interest in Schum at an NFL regional combine. He signed with the Cleveland Browns on March 28, 2013. On May 13, 2013, he was waived by the Browns.

=== Tampa Bay Buccaneers (first stint) ===
On January 6, 2014, the Tampa Bay Buccaneers signed Schum to a reserve/future contract. He was waived by the Buccaneers on May 21, 2014.

=== New York Jets (first stint) ===
Schum was signed by the New York Jets on June 19, 2014 to compete with incumbent Ryan Quigley in training camp. He was released on August 23, 2014.

=== Tampa Bay Buccaneers (second stint) ===
The Buccaneers signed Schum to their practice squad on November 14, 2014, but was waived four days later.

=== New York Jets (second stint) ===
The Jets signed Schum to a reserve/future contract on December 30, 2014. He was released on August 18, 2015.

=== Tampa Bay Buccaneers (third stint) ===
On August 26, 2015, the Buccaneers signed Schum to compete with Karl Schmitz and Michael Koenen. By September 1, Schum was the last remaining punter on the Buccaneers roster after roster cuts. Schum made his NFL debut with four punts in a game against the Tennessee Titans in September 2015, nearly four years after his final college game. On August 28, 2016, Schum was waived by the Buccaneers.

=== Green Bay Packers ===
Schum was claimed off waivers by the Green Bay Packers on August 30, 2016. He re-signed with the Packers on March 8, 2017. On June 1, 2017, he was released by the Packers.

=== Tampa Bay Vipers ===
In October 2019, Schum was put on the 2020 XFL draft pool and was selected by the Tampa Bay Vipers in the open rounds. He had his contract terminated when the league suspended operations on April 10, 2020.

=== DC Defenders ===
On November 18, 2022, Schum was selected by the DC Defenders of the XFL. He was released on January 21, 2023.

== Career statistics ==
=== NFL ===
Year	Team	GP	Punting										
Year	Team	GP	Punts	Yds	Lng	Avg	Net Avg	Blk	Ins20	TB	Ret	RetY	TD
2015	TB	16	56	2,348	60	41.9	38.0	0	15	4	27	140	0
2016	GB	16	56	2,420	65	43.2	39.1	0	19	4	16	151	0
Total		32	112	4,768	65	42.6	38.5	0	34	8	43	291	0
Source: NFL.com

=== College ===
Year	Team	GP	Punting				
Year	Team	GP	Punts	Yds	Lng	Avg	In 20
2007	BUF ST.	10	59	2,058	55	34.9	10
2009	BUF	Did not play					
2010	BUF	12	58	2,231	62	38.5	13
2011	BUF	12	61	2,369	61	38.8	11
Total		34	178	6,658	62	37.4	34
