= IK Enemkpali =

American football player (born 1991)

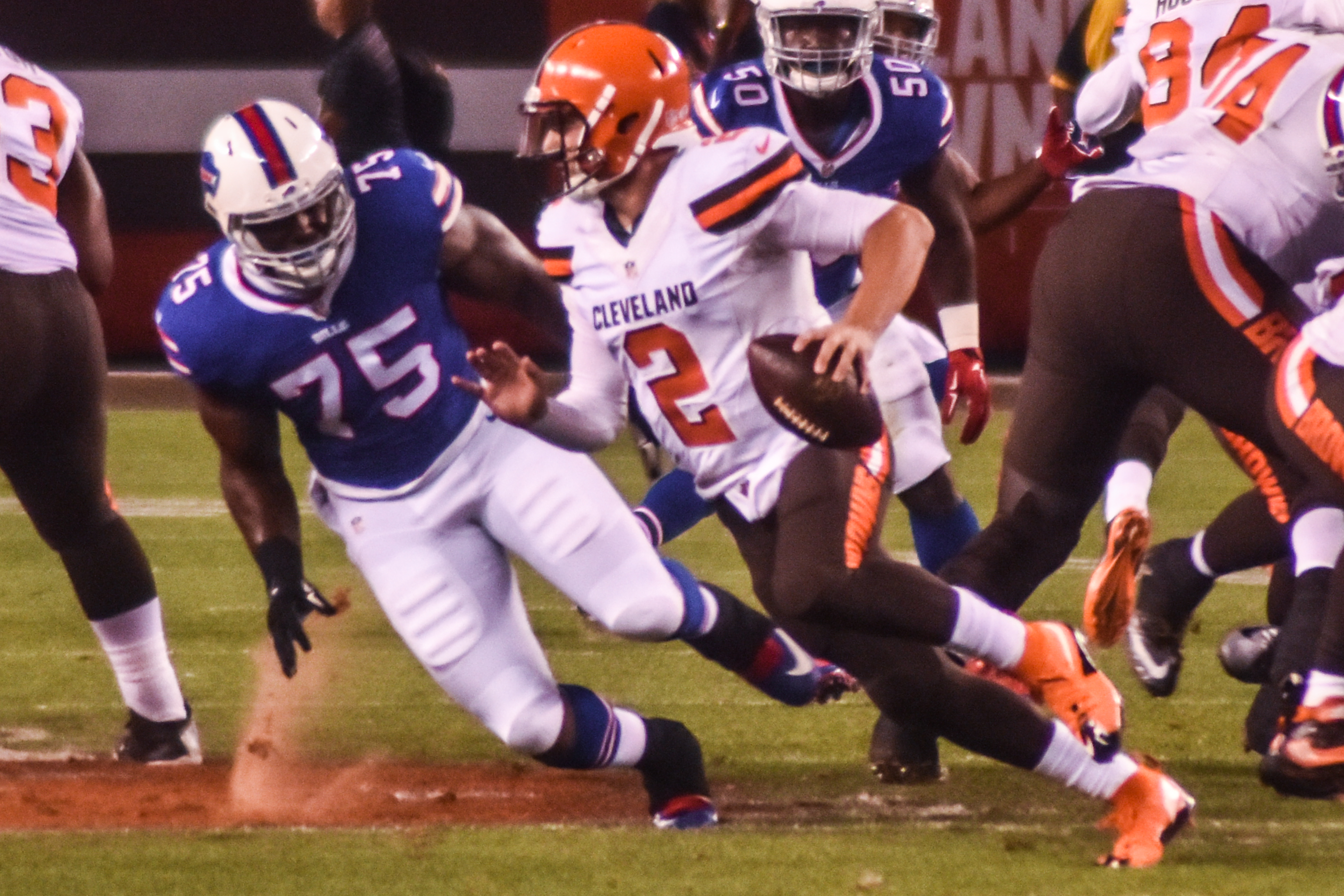
- Enemkpali (#75) with the Buffalo Bills in 2015

No. 51, 75
- Position: Defensive end

Personal information
- Born: July 3, 1991 (age 35); Pflugerville, Texas, U.S.
- Listed height: 6 ft 1 in (1.85 m)
- Listed weight: 261 lb (118 kg)

Career information
- High school: Pflugerville
- College: Louisiana Tech
- NFL draft: 2014: 6th round, 210th overall pick

Career history
- New York Jets (2014); Buffalo Bills (2015–2016); Oakland Raiders (2017)*
- * Offseason or practice squad member only

Awards and highlights
- First-team All-C-USA (2013); First-team All-WAC (2012)

Career NFL statistics
- Games played: 17
- Total tackles: 16
- Stats at Pro Football Reference

Ikemefuna Chinedum "IK" Enemkpali (born July 3, 1991) is an American former professional football player who was a defensive end in the National Football League (NFL). He was selected by the New York Jets in the sixth round of the 2014 NFL draft. He played college football for the Louisiana Tech Bulldogs.

Enemkpali is best known for his altercation with his Jets teammate and starting quarterback Geno Smith, when he punched Smith in the jaw over a $1,200 plane ticket dispute, $600 of which was to be reimbursed. The punch broke Smith's jaw, causing him to miss multiple games and not play that season, and led to the release of Enemkpali.

== Early life ==
Enemkpali was born in Pflugerville, Texas, on July 3, 1991, to Igbo Nigerian immigrants. He attended Pflugerville High School in Texas, where he played for the Panthers football team. Enemkpali was selected to the All-District 25-5A first-team and all-Central Texas third-team by the American Statesman. He had 64 tackles and 14 sacks in his senior season in high school.

== College career ==
Enemkpali attended Louisiana Tech University from 2009 to 2013. He was selected to the 2012 First-team All-WAC and All-Louisiana First-team in his junior season. He was named as the 2012 Fred Dean Defensive Player of the Year in junior season. He was selected 2013 First-team All-Conference USA and All-Louisiana First-team following his senior season. He was selected as the 2013 Willie Roaf Lineman of the Year in his senior season.

== Professional career ==
=== New York Jets ===
Enemkpali was selected by the New York Jets in the sixth round (210th overall) of the 2014 NFL draft. In his rookie season, he appeared in six games, making three tackles and defending two passes.

On August 11, 2015, Enemkpali got into an altercation with quarterback Geno Smith in the locker room, regarding $600 Smith allegedly owed Enemkpali. Enemkpali punched Smith in his face, strong enough to break his jaw. The Jets released Enemkpali shortly thereafter.

=== Buffalo Bills ===
On August 12, 2015, one day after being waived by the Jets, Enemkpali was claimed by the Buffalo Bills, who had hired Rex Ryan (the Jets' head coach in 2014) as their head coach that year. He was released by the Bills on September 4, but signed to the practice squad a few days later. On September 10, nearly a month after attacking Smith, the NFL suspended Enemkpali for four games. On September 11, the Bills promoted Enemkpali to their 53-man roster; he was placed on the reserve/suspended list on the following day. He played 11 games in 2015 with 13 tackles.

On August 12, 2016, Enemkpali got into an altercation with offensive lineman and teammate Cyrus Kouandjio during training camp. One day later, Enemkpali suffered a knee injury during the first preseason game against the Indianapolis Colts, which was eventually revealed to be a torn ACL, and it prematurely ended his 2016 season. He was granted free agency following the season.

=== Oakland Raiders ===
On August 4, 2017, the Oakland Raiders signed Enemkpali. Enemkpali was waived by the Raiders on September 2.

== Personal life ==
Enemkpali's sister, Nneka, played basketball for the Texas Longhorns from 2011 until 2015. The Seattle Storm selected her with the twenty-sixth overall pick in the 2015 WNBA draft.

=== 2011 arrest ===
When Enemkpali was 19, he threw a punch at a security guard and was tasered by a deputy. Enemkpali was later charged with simple battery, put on 13 months of probation, and ordered to undergo 32 hours of community service along with anger management counseling.
