= Anthony Grady =

American football player (born 1990)

No. 68
- Position: Defensive end

Personal information
- Born: August 6, 1990 (age 36); Texarkana, Texas, U.S.
- Listed height: 6 ft 7 in (2.01 m)
- Listed weight: 289 lb (131 kg)

Career information
- High school: Texarkana (AR) Arkansas
- College: Missouri State
- NFL draft: 2014: undrafted

Career history
- New York Jets (2014)*; New Orleans VooDoo (2015)
- * Offseason or practice squad member only

Anthony Scott Grady (born August 6, 1990) is an American former football defensive end. He played college football at Missouri State. He was signed by the New York Jets as an undrafted free agent in 2014.

== Early life ==
Grady attended Arkansas High School in Texarkana, Arkansas where he won back-to-back Class 6A state championships in the 2006 and 2007 seasons. He participated in the Arkansas All-Star Game. He had 58 tackles, 9 sacks and 14 pass deflections in his senior season in high school.

== College career ==
In 2009, he was selected as the MSU Defensive Scout Team Co-Player of the Year following the season. He was named MSU Defensive Scout Team Player of the Week. In his junior season, he was named as an All-MVFC honorable mention. Also in his junior season, he was named CFPA National Defensive Lineman of the Week. He finished college with a total of 108 Tackles, 9 Sacks and 6 Pass Deflections.

== Professional career ==
=== New York Jets ===
On May 11, 2014, he signed with the New York Jets as an undrafted free agent. He was released on August 24, 2014.

=== New Orleans VooDoo ===
On November 17, 2014, he was assigned to the New Orleans VooDoo of the Arena Football League. He was placed on league suspension on April 2, 2015.
