= History of American wine =

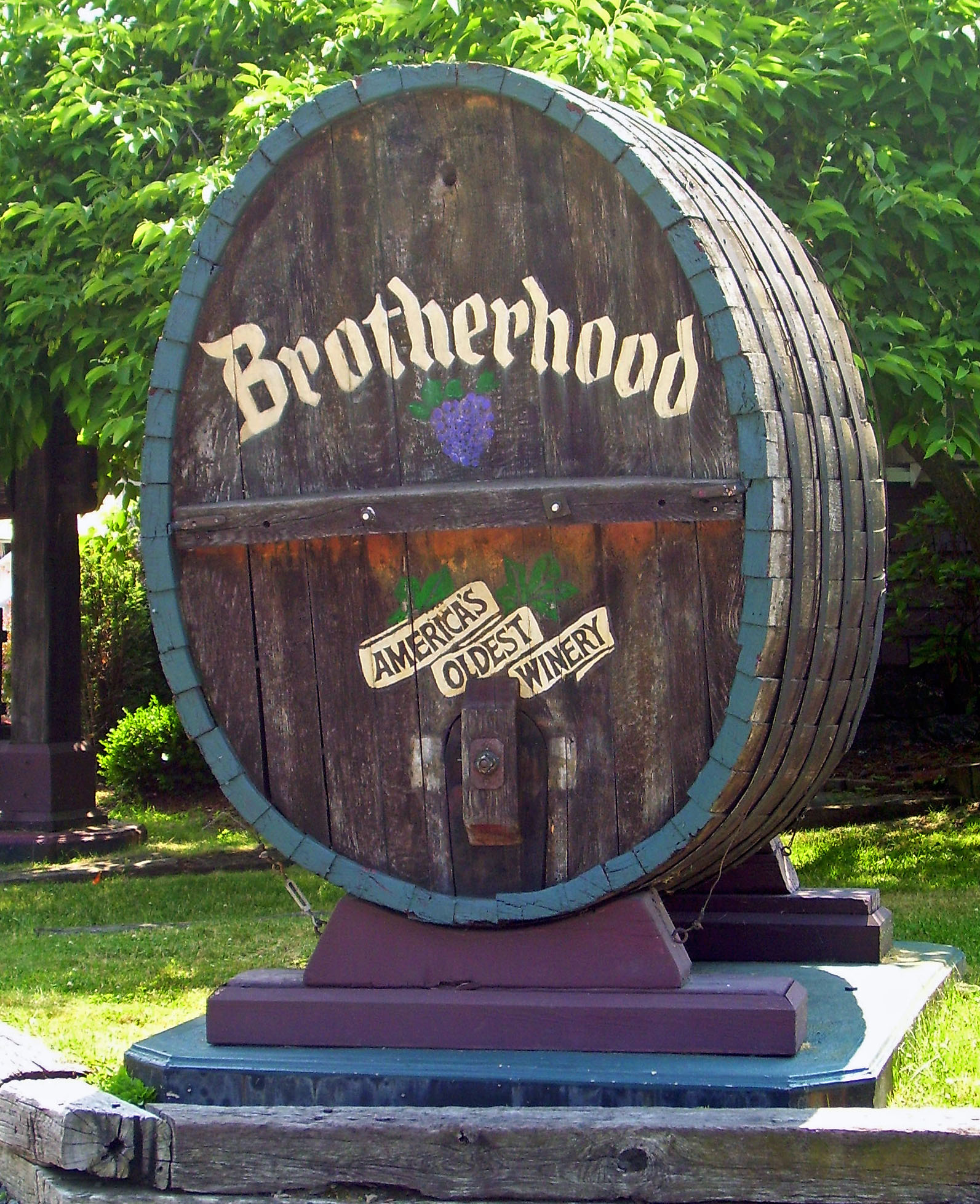
The Brotherhood Winery, in Washingtonville, New York, is the longest continual winery in the United States; it was built in 1838.

The wide variety of wild grapes in North America were eaten by the indigenous people. The first Europeans exploring parts of North America called it Vinland because of the profusion of grape vines found there. The various native grapes had flavors which were unfamiliar to European settlers and did not like using them in the initial production of American wine. This led to repeated efforts to grow familiar Vitis vinifera varieties. The first vines of Vitis vinifera origin came up through New Spain (Mexico) and were planted in Senecu in 1629, which is near the present day town of San Antonio, New Mexico.

The discovery in 1802 of the native Catawba grape led to very successful wine-making in Ohio. By 1842 Nicholas Longworth was growing 1,200 acres (4.9 km^{2}) of Catawba grapes and making the country's first Sparkling wine. In 1858, The Illustrated London News described Catawba as "a finer wine of the hock species and flavor than any hock that comes from the Rhine" and wrote that sparkling Catawba "transcends the Champagne of France." But the successful operations in Ohio ceased when fungus disease destroyed the vineyards. Some growers responded by moving north to the shores of Lake Erie and its islands, where mildew was not a problem. The Finger Lakes region of New York State developed a successful wine-making industry beginning in the early 1860s when the Pleasant Valley Wine Company began using carefully selected derivatives of native grapes to produce wine. In 1865 the Urbana Wine Company (which marketed its wine under the Gold Seal label) was established. In 1872, O-Neh-Da Vineyard was established by the late Bishop Bernard McQuaid, on the shores of Hemlock Lake, to make pure grape wine for his churches. 1880 saw the establishment of the Taylor Wine Company. By the late 19th century, wines from the Finger Lakes were winning prizes at wine tastings in Europe.

== California wine ==
In California, the first vineyard and winery was established by Spanish Catholic missionaries in 1769. California has two native grape varieties, but they make very poor quality wine. Therefore, the missionaries used the Mission grape, which is called Criolla or "colonialized European" in South America. Although a Vitis vinifera, it is a grape of "very modest" quality. The first secular vineyard was established in Los Angeles by an immigrant from Bordeaux, Jean-Louis Vignes. Dissatisfied with the Mission grape, he imported vines from France. By 1851 he had 40,000 vines under cultivation and was producing 1,000 US barrels (120,000 L) of wine per year.

Major wine production shifted to the Sonoma Valley in northern California largely because of its excellent climate for growing grapes. General Mariano Vallejo, former commander of the presidio of Sonoma, became the first large-scale winegrower in the valley. In 1857, Agoston Haraszthy bought 520 acres (2.1 km^{2}) near Vallejo's vineyards. In contrast to Vallejo and most others, Haraszthy planted his vines on dry slopes and did not irrigate them. Today, the value of dry farming to creating superior wine is generally recognized.

Haraszthy has been called the "Father of Modern Viticulture in California." He wrote Report on Grapes and Wines in California, a manual on vineyard management and wine making procedures in which he urged experimentation with different grape varieties in different soils and different parts of the state. He also urged the government to collect cuttings from Europe and distribute them to growers in California. In 1861, the State Legislature commissioned Haraszthy to travel to Europe and purchase a diversity of grapevines. He did so, and obtained 100,000 vines of 300 different varieties.

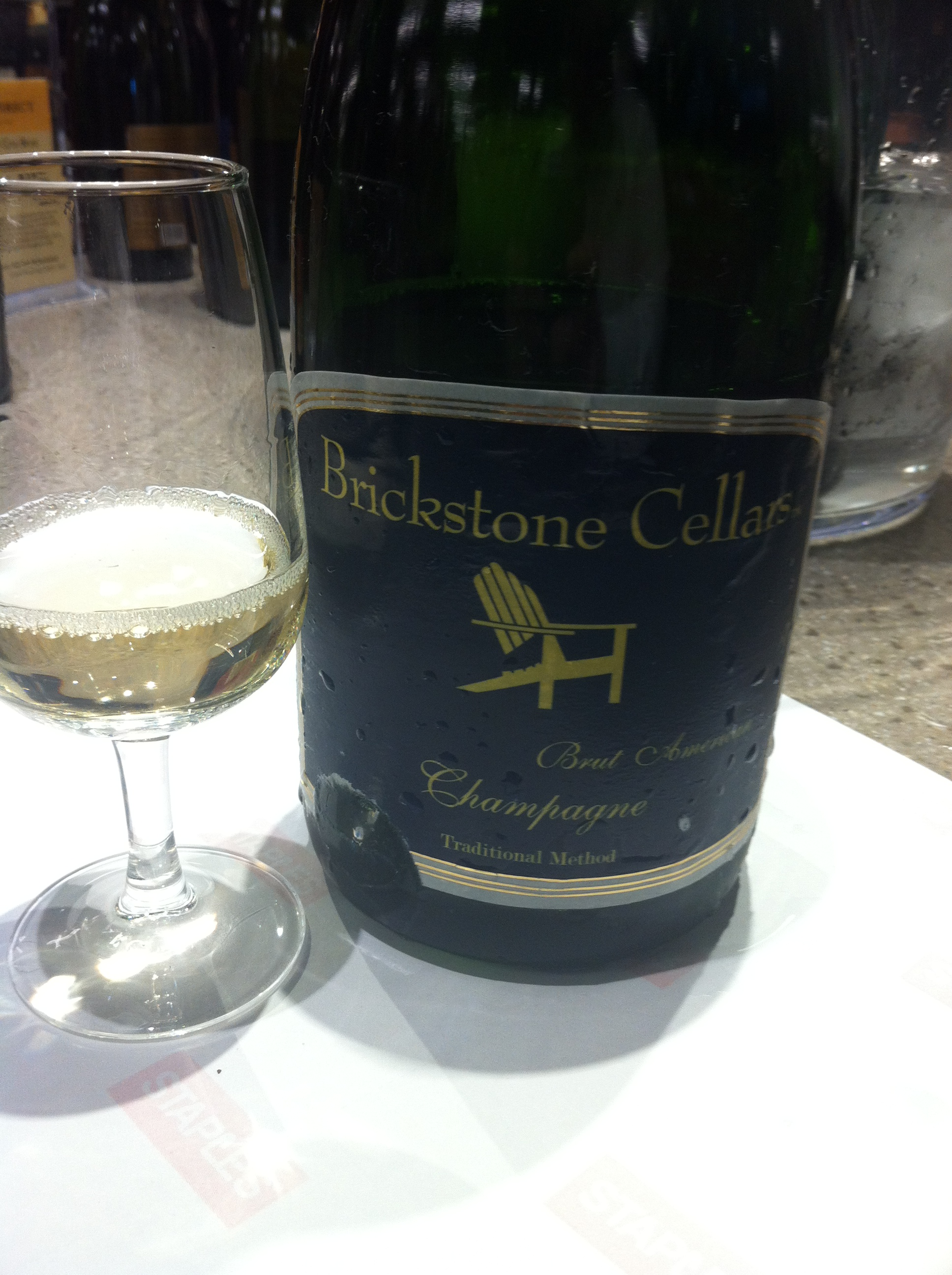
Sparkling wine from Pleasant Valley Wine Company in New York, the first bonded winery in the United States

In 1852, Charles LeFranc established what became the very successful Almaden Vineyards, where he planted Cabernet Sauvignon, Pinot noir, Semillon, and many others. LeFranc produced good wine as did his son-in-law, Paul Masson. In 1854, John Patchett planted the first commercial vineyard in Napa Valley and established the first winery there in 1858. In 1861 Charles Krug who previously had worked for Agoston Haraszthy and Patchett founded his namesake winery in St. Helena and began making his own wine. Originally a Prussian political dissident, Krug learned the trade of the vintner as an apprentice to Haraszthy in the Sonoma Valley. The land on which Krug founded his winery was part of his wife's (Carolina Bale's) dowry. Krug became an important leader of winemaking in the Napa Valley. He was also a mentor for Karl Wente, Charles Wetmore and Jacob Beringer, all of whom became important vintners.

Early on, the Napa Valley demonstrated leadership in producing quality wine. At the Exposition Universelle in Paris in 1889, Napa Valley wines won 20 of the 34 medals or awards (including four gold medals) won by California entries. This was the high point that was followed by 40 years of natural and human-caused disasters. Severe frosts, the outbreak of the phylloxera louse which destroyed Vitis vinifera vines, an economic depression, the San Francisco earthquake that destroyed an estimated 30,000,000 US gallons (110,000,000 L) of wine in storage, and the disaster of national Prohibition from 1920 through 1933.

== Prohibition ==
Some wineries managed to survive by making wine for religious services. However, grape growers prospered. Because making up to 200 US gallons (760 L) of wine at home per year was legal, such production increased from an estimated 4,000,000 US gallons (15,000,000 L) before Prohibition to 90,000,000 US gallons (340,000,000 L) five years after the imposition of the law. Unfortunately, quality grapes do not ship well, so producers ripped out their vines and replaced them with tough but poor quality grapes such as Alicante Bouschet and Alicante Ganzin.

Following Prohibition, American wine making reemerged in very poor condition. Many talented winemakers had died, vineyards had been neglected or replanted in poor quality grapes, and Prohibition had changed Americans' taste in wines. Consumers now demanded cheap "jug wine" (aka "dago red") and sweet, fortified (high alcohol) wine. Before Prohibition dry table wines outsold sweet wines by three to one, but after the ratio was more than reversed. In 1935, 81% of California's production was sweet wines. The reputation of the state's wines suffered accordingly.

During the 1970s a system was established to identify appellations of origins, using the term American Viticultural Areas (AVA). An AVA guarantees that a minimum of 85% of the wine in the bottle comes from grapes grown in that AVA. The use of individual vineyard names guarantees that 95% of any wine using a vineyard name must be made from grapes grown in that vineyard, and from within a recognized AVA. There are 238 AVAs, of which 138 are in California.

Leading the way out of the abyss was research conducted at the University of California, Davis. Faculty published reports on which varieties of grapes grew best in which regions of the state, held seminars on winemaking techniques, consulted with grape growers and winemakers, offered academic degrees in viticulture, and promoted the production of quality wines. The results of their success would be demonstrated decades later at the Paris wine tasting in 1976, the nation's 200th anniversary.
