= Hermann J. Wiemer =

Winemaker (1941–present)

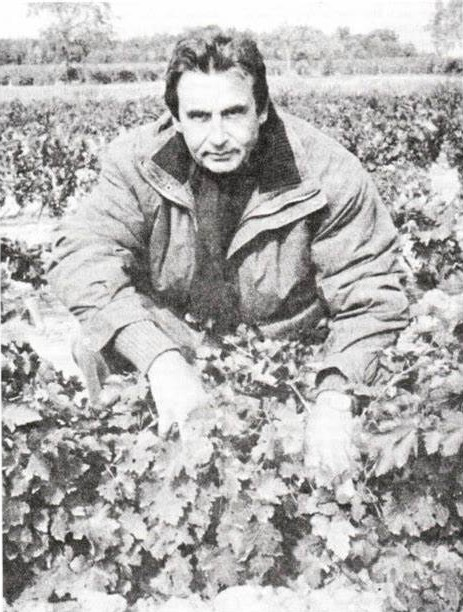
- Hermann J. Wiemer in his nursery in 1992
- Born: Bernkastel-Wittlich, Germany
- Occupation: retired winemaker
- Known for: Hermann J. Wiemer Vineyard
- Website: www.wiemer.com

Hermann J. Wiemer is the founder of Hermann J. Wiemer Vineyard, a winery specializing in Rieslings in Dundee, New York.

== Early life and education ==
Wiemer was born in Bernkastel-Wittlich, Germany and raised in Bernkastel-Kues. His mother's family has been growing grapes for three centuries, and his father, Eduard, worked for the Geisenheim Grape Breeding Institute (commonly called the Geisenheim Institute) and was the director for a grafting experimental station in Bernkastel. As a grafting expert, Eduard taught his son how to graft Mosel Rieslings onto American rootstock, and Wiemer learned how to clone grape vines at 14. As the only son, he spent a lot of his youth "pulling weeds and pruning" while his schoolmates were playing soccer. While Wiemer was in high school, he worked for two years in Deidisheim, in the Rhine Valley, working in vineyards as a kind of college prep course.

He studied oenology at the Geisenheim Institute.

== Early years in New York ==
In 1965, Wiemer moved to Conesus, New York, for a year where he worked for St. Michel's Seminary and its winemaker, Leo Goering, a 1922 graduate of Geisenheim. There his job was to add 20 acres of European grapes grafted onto American rootstock to the O-Neh-da Vineyard on the west side of Hemlock Lake, one of the eleven Finger Lakes. After gaining experience from his German mentor and learning some English, he returned to Germany. Then Dr. Helmut Becker, the renowned viticulturist who had been his professor at Geisenheim, introduced him to Walter Taylor of Bully Hill Vineyards while Taylor was traveling in Germany. In 1968 Taylor hired him as a winemaker, and Wiemer relocated to Hammondsport on the southwest side of Keuka Lake. He helped in the vineyard and in winemaking as Taylor prepared to establish his Bully Hill Vineyards in 1970, but Wiemer was never the fan of French-American hybrid grapes that Taylor was. Wiemer met Dr. Konstantin Frank, the Ukrainian-born winemaker who opened his Vinifera Wine Cellars winery in 1962 just four miles (six kilometers) north of Bully Hill. Dr. Frank had written his thesis on how to grow Vitis vinifera (the scientific name for European grapes) in cold climates and was proving it could be done in Hammondsport. Frank believed that the reason vinifera grapes had not survived the freezing New York winters was because they had not been grafted onto suitable American rootstock.

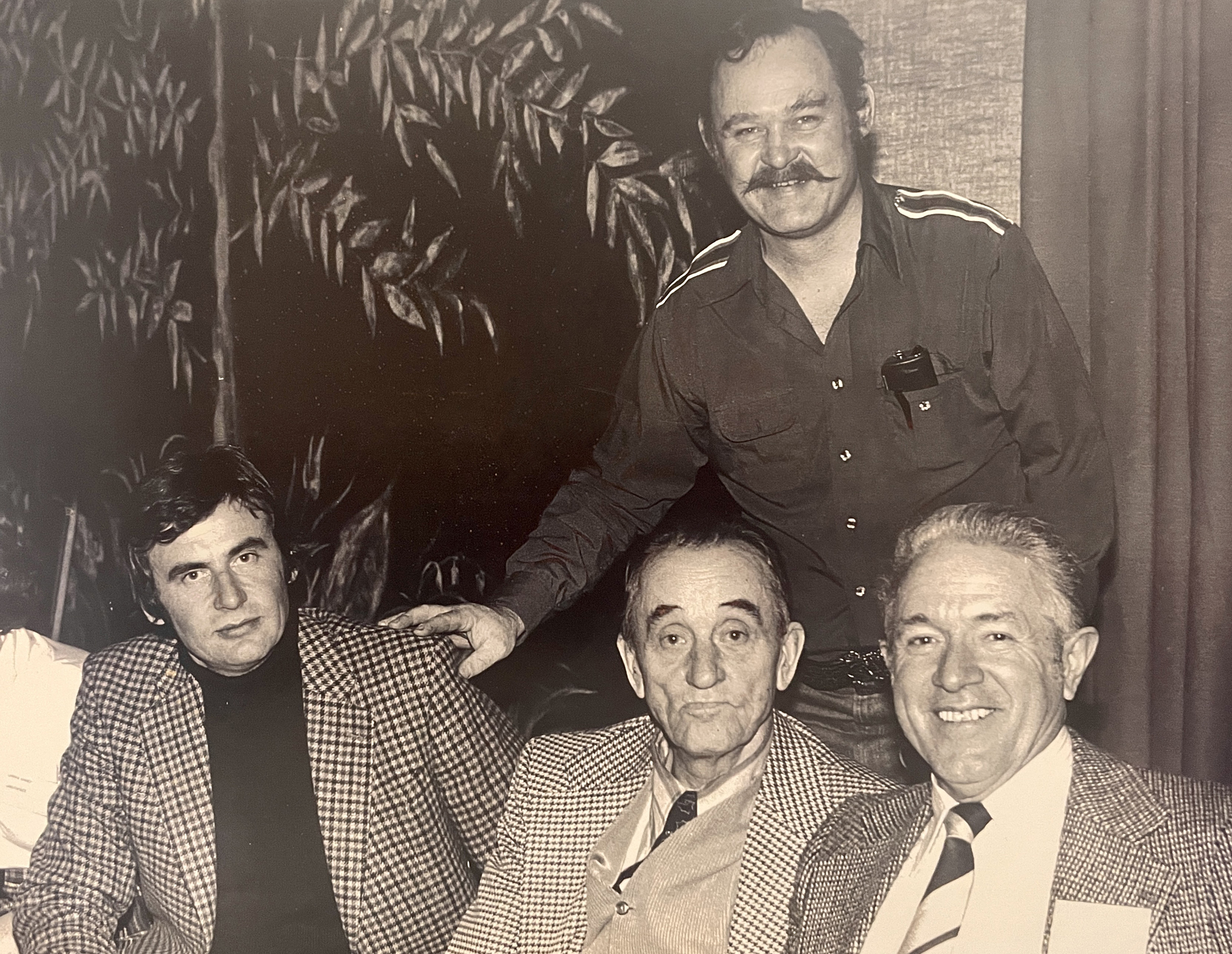
Left to right: Hermann J. Wiemer, Dr. Konstantin Frank, Walter Taylor (standing), and Helmut Becker in 1980

Seeing Dr. Frank's success with grafted vinifera grapes encouraged Wiemer's interest in growing vinifera on American rootstock in New York. He was also encouraged by the peach and black cherry trees in the area because Germans believed that where those trees grow, so could European grapes. He chose an abandoned farm in Dundee, a village on the west side of Seneca Lake in 1973. The 140-acre (57-hectare) parcel had been a soybean farm and came with a house from the 1880s and a "new" barn from the 1930s. That same year, he began to plant vinifera (Chardonnay, Riesling, and Gewurztraminer), despite local experts claiming that European grapevines could never grow on Seneca Lake because of the cold New York winters. He expanded the blocks in 1978 to a full nine acres of Riesling and another nine acres of Chardonnay.

Wiemer also established a nursery on his new land, where he grafted vinifera scions (the upper part of a grafted plant) onto American rootstock. At the time, he was able to import the vines from Europe. His first customers were from New York and the east coast, but he soon expanded to Michigan, Texas, and all the way to California. The nursery and his job at Bully Hill gave him the income he needed to continue investing in his vineyard to make it a success.

== Establishing Hermann J. Wiemer Vineyard ==
With a thriving nursery, Wiemer turned to establishing a winery, and the timing was perfect because New York had just passed the Farm Winery Act in June 1976, allowing growers of small vineyards to produce and sell wines in tasting rooms on their farms. Before the law was passed, there were only 19 wineries in the state, and there were none on Seneca Lake. Two years later in 1979, he officially established his eponymous winery when he produced his first vintage of 900 cases of two wines. He submitted samples of both to the New York State Fair wine competition in 1980, and his 1979 Chardonnay won gold in the newly established vinifera category, while his 1979 dry Riesling won the bronze. The New York Times wrote a favorable article about him and his new winery in November of that year, saying that he was "proving ... that European varietals can be produced successfully here" in New York and that he was "the leading advocate of cultivating European varietals."

In December 1980, Wiemer went home to Bernkastel to visit his parents for the holidays. On December 29, he received a mailgram from Walter Taylor, saying, "Due to financial problems, we have been forced to lay off employees. Unfortunately, your employment was terminated as of Monday, December 29th, 1980."

Due to his sudden unemployment after over a decade of helping Walter Taylor, Wiemer turned his full attention to his burgeoning nursery, vineyard, and winery. By 1983, Wiemer's wines were being served in restaurants like the Four Seasons, Lavin's, and Windows on the World. He also worked as a consultant to other wineries. Demand for his wines was growing, and in 1985 Wiemer realized that he would need to double production from 6,000 cases a year to 12,000. Riesling and Chardonnay made up the majority of his production, but his Champagne-style sparkling and Burgundy-style Pinot Noir were also successful, reflecting the changing tastes of the American market. His grapevines were also being shipped all over the country but especially to Long Island and Virginia. The nursery was producing 350,000 vines per year, using omega grafts, resulting in a 95 to 98 percent success rate of budding in the callusing box.

By 1987, the vineyard was producing 10,000 cases of wine from 65 acres of vineyards and making one million dollars in annual sales. The nursery was a separate company from his winery and shipped about 500,000 vines per year to customers around the country.

In 1988, Wiemer's 1986 Riesling was the first New York wine to be served on an international flight on American Airlines. He was flying coach to West Germany, and a keen-eyed American Airlines employee noticed his name was the same as the wine being served in first class. He had submitted the wine for consideration but had no idea it had been chosen. The winemaker was offered a complimentary first-class seat, which he accepted.

In 1989, he made 11,000 cases and had 35 acres planted in Riesling, with which he produced a dry, semi-dry, late harvest, late harvest Trockenbeerenauslese, as well as a sparkling vintage. By 1991, Hermann J. Wiemer Vineyard was producing about 15,000 cases a year, and by 1992, Wiemer had 55 acres of vineyards.

In 1996 and 1998, his winery produced 17,000 cases, which he considered classified it as a medium-sized winery. He also worked as a consultant to many California wineries, and his nursery was selling vines to vineyards all across the country. By 1998, more than half the grapevines in Long Island vineyards came from Wiemer's nursery.

Over the years, Wiemer had expanded sales and grown the reputation of the winery by focusing on the quality of his vines (mainly Riesling, Chardonnay, Pinot Noir and Champagne-style sparkling) and winemaking rather than by adding a boutique or restaurant like other local wineries. His wines were being sold in six eastern states and were featured in high-end restaurants, such as Lutèce in Washington, D.C., and Oceana in New York City. His vines were also being sold to top vineyards around the world.

Wiemer realized that the gravelly soil and location of his vineyard could produce outstanding mineral-driven wines, but he also wanted to offer fruit-forward wines, so in 1998, he bought two vineyards in Dresden, 10 miles (16 kilometers) north of his Dundee vineyard. They were owned by Taylor Wine Company, and one of them had been planted with Riesling and Gewürztraminer in 1974. The new vineyards were later named Magdalena (for his mother) and Josef (for his maternal uncle) in 2007.

In order to encourage the growth and health of natural yeast in the vineyards, Wiemer decided to eliminate the use of herbicides in 2003. By 2005, he was growing 60 acres of vinifera, 30 of which were devoted to Riesling.

== Success and retirement ==
In 2001, Wiemer hired Fred Merwarth, who had just finished his degree in agricultural business. Merwarth eventually became Wiemer's winemaker.

In 2006, Wiemer's Riesling Reserve 2002 won the Governor's Cup awarded by the New York Wine and Grape Foundation. This award goes to the best of show in the annual New York Wine Classic. The wine was also named best Riesling and best white wine.

At the age of 66, Wiemer retired in August 2007 and turned the winery over to Fred Merwarth, and Fred's wife, Maressa, and Fred's Cornell classmate, Oskar Bynke. Wiemer then retired to Ithaca, located on the south end of Cayuga Lake.
