= Greyton H. Taylor =

Greyton H. Taylor (March 29, 1903 – June 13, 1971) was an American third generation winemaker in the Finger Lakes Region of New York State. He was born in Hammondsport, New York on March 29, 1903. He was the youngest of five children born to Walter Taylor, founder of The Taylor Wine Company, and Addie Chapman Taylor. He and his wife, Mrs. Muriel Flander Taylor had three children, Walter Stephen Taylor, Mrs. Ellen Jane Flanagan, and Mrs. Dina Hoyt Gould. Taylor died on June 13, 1971 in Rochester, New York.

== Wine industry career ==
Taylor served as a managing partner in the Taylor Wine Company from 1933 to 1955. In 1955, he became Director of The Taylor Wine Company, Inc. and on January 1, 1962, he was appointed President and Managing Director of the newly acquired Pleasant Valley Wine Company, producers of Great Western Wines and Champagnes. Upon assuming the management of Pleasant Valley Wine Company, he began adding “varietals” to the portfolio of table wines sold by Pleasant Valley. These “varietals” included Delaware and Diamond from the white Labrusca grape varieties and Isabella, a Labrusca rosé. In 1964, under Taylor's leadership, Pleasant Valley became the first Finger Lakes winery to introduce wines made exclusively with the new French-American hybrid grapes. With a goal of moving away from the generic names of their table wines, to identifying the wines by the grapes that increasingly were proportionately made from, such as adding the “Aurora” grape name to the label of the Great Western Sauterne and “Baco Noir” to the almost dry burgundy, and the claret became “Chelois.”

In 1919 Greyton’s father sold the original farm and vineyards on Bully Hill, the site where Taylor Wine Company began in 1880, to the Sprague family and moved the Taylor Wine Company to Hammondsport to gain access to water and electricity. Forty years later Greyton and his son Walter S. Taylor began to repurchase the original homestead and property from the same man his father sold it to prior to prohibition. They did this with the intent of establishing an estate winery on the original property where Taylor wine had begun almost a century earlier. Greyton and his son Walter S. Taylor both became disillusioned with the direction that Taylor Wine Company took once it became a public corporation. Greyton had brought Juergen Loenholdt, a respected German viticulturist to the Finger Lakes Region. Loenholdt, trained at Germany's Geisenheim Institute, was skilled at growing grapes in a cold climate. Greyton needed a winemaker skilled in making estate wines and he hired Hermann Wiemer, who was also trained at Germany’s Geisenheim Institute. Together, Loenholdt and Wiemer, along with Greyton and Walter S. Taylor went about producing wine made from North American heirloom grapes, and French hybrid grapes, crosses between native grapes, capable of withstanding harsh northern winters, and the “noble” French grapes used to produce fine French wines. Today Bully Hill Vineyards is one of the largest producers of wine in the Finger Lakes Region of New York State and their wines are sold throughout the U.S.

== Professional associations ==
Taylor was President of the Finger Lakes Wine Growers Association, President of the Bottle Fermented Champagne Producers Association and Chairman of the Wine Conference of America. In March of 1940, as President of the Finger Lakes Wine Growers Association he testified before the Federal Monopoly Committee regarding interstate trade barriers affecting the wine industry. In his testimony Taylor conveyed that interstate trade barriers block an estimated 10 to 15 million gallons of wine sales annually in the U.S. Taylor identified 52 trade discriminations across 28 states that treat out-of-state wine and grapes as "foreign" commodities competing with home-state industries. He shared that because California is the source of nearly 90% of wine sold in the U.S., it suffers the most, with an estimated loss of $5,000,000 per year.

Taylor was also chairman of the Board of both the New York State Wine Institute and the Finger Lakes Wine Museum. During his business career he was devoted to grape growing and winemaking, resulting in the introduction of many newly developed grape varieties into commercial plantings. In his 1958 address to the Sommelier Society of America Taylor explained that the Federal Tax on bubbles in champagne, was 20 times that on still wines, although their alcoholic content was about the same.

== Author ==
In Taylor's book, Treasury of Wine & Wine Cookery, he promotes the use of quality wines in the home, both as a beverage and a condiment in cooking.

== Park Dedication ==
Greyton donated a 4.9 acre parcel on Hilton Head Island to establish a park to honor the island’s Gullah culture and rich maritime heritage. The Greyton H. Taylor Memorial Family Park was dedicated to the people of Hilton Head by Muriel Flander Taylor, Greyton’s wife, on April 24th, 1992.
