= Richard P. Vine =

Richard P. Vine, born 1937 in Steuben County, New York, is professor emeritus of enology at Purdue University in the US state of Indiana, where he taught winemaking and led the Wine Appreciation course (FS 470).

== Career and teaching background ==
Vine served as Purdue University's first professor of enology from 1991 until his retirement in 2004. The university later honored his legacy by dedicating the Richard P. Vine Enology Library in the Nelson Hall of Food Science. Before his time at Purdue, he held research and academic positions at Mississippi State University starting in 1977, where he completed his degrees. The library contains over 1,000 books on wine and winemaking. In the library's collection is a signed, first edition copy of the 1826 book The American Vine Dresser's Guide, by author John James Dufour, who was a prominent Indiana winemaker at the time.

His hands-on winemaking career began in 1958 in the Finger Lakes region of New York, at the Pleasant Valley Wine Company (Great Western), where he was the assistant to winemaker Lou Stanton. When Stanton died suddenly from a heart attack, Greyton Taylor, President of Great Western, asked Vine to assume the duties of winemaker until Greyton could find a replacement. Soon after he was hired as winemaker, he enrolled at Corning Community College to study Chemistry and Biology. Greyton hired a retired local winemaker to check on Vine's work. By the time of Greyton's death, Vine had risen to winemaker and executive vice president at Great Western. He later worked as Vice President of Production at Warner Vineyards in Michigan. He also served as the official wine consultant for American Airlines for 21 years.

After leaving Pleasant Valley winery Vine moved to Indiana where he planted a vineyard. He returned to New York in 1971, and along with his partner Edward Moulton, purchased the former Chateau Gay winery near Niagara Falls, and named it the Niagara Falls Wine Cellar. They soon produced ten wines made from grapes from the Chautauqua Belt. Vine preferred the labeling of his sparkling wines as "Blanc de Blancs" rather than champagne, as was the custom for American wine.

== Publications ==
Vine authored several books including Winemaking: from grape growing to marketplace, Commercial Winemaking: Process and Controls, and Home Winemaker's Handbook, a “how to” book on making wine at home, co-authored with Walter S. Taylor.
