= Robert Simonson =

American journalist and author (born 1964)

- Occupations: Journalist, The New York Times contributor, author
- Website: robertsimonson.net

Robert Simonson is an American journalist and author.

== Career ==
Robert Simonson began writing about cocktails, spirits and bars for The New York Times in 2009. He has also written frequently for Imbibe, Whisky Advocate, Saveur, Food & Wine and Lucky Peach. Since 2017, he has been a contributing editor at Punch. His book 3-Ingredient Cocktails was nominated for a James Beard Award. His other writings have been nominated for a total of 10 Spirited Awards, which are awarded annually by Tales of the Cocktail.

Before becoming a cocktail writer, he wrote about the theater for 15 years, primarily for The New York Times and Playbill, where he was an editor and writer for 16 years. He also wrote four books about the theater.

== Bibliography ==
- Simonson, Robert (2014). The Old-Fashioned: The Story of the World's First Classic Cocktail, with Recipes and Lore. Ten Speed Press. ISBN 978-1607745358.
- Simonson, Robert (2016). A Proper Drink: The Untold Story of How a Band of Bartenders Saved the Civilized Drinking World. Ten Speed Press. ISBN 978-1-60774-754-3. OCLC 933567553.
- Simonson, Robert (2017). 3-Ingredient Cocktails: An Opinionated Guide to the Most Enduring Drinks in the Cocktail Canon. Ten Speed Press. ISBN 978-0399578540.
