= Konstantin Frank =

American winemaker (1899–1985)

Konstantin Frank

Dr. Konstantin Frank (1899–1985) was a viticulturist and pioneering winemaker of the 1950s in the Finger Lakes region of New York.

== Early years ==
Frank was born in Odessa, Ukraine (then part of the Russian Empire) and received his PhD in viticulture from the Odessa Polytechnic Institute, his thesis being on techniques for growing Vitis vinifera in a cold climate. After working for a time in what was then Soviet Georgia managing a large state-owned vineyard, he came to the United States in 1951. Speaking nine languages, English not being one of them, Frank was forced to take a job as a dishwasher in New York City. When he could save up enough, Frank moved with his family to the Cornell University Geneva Experiment Station in 1953.

== Success ==
For 300 years, failed attempts to plant "Vitis vinifera" varieties in the northern latitudes of North America were blamed on the cold weather. With extensive experience growing the European grapes in below freezing temperatures back in Ukraine, Frank knew it would be possible with the grafting techniques that he developed. At the start Frank's ideas were ridiculed. No one thought that Vitis vinifera would grow in cold Upstate New York. At a wine conference Frank met Charles Fournier, who was President of Gold Seal Winery, Fournier listened to Frank and believed that he might be right. Fournier hired Frank at Gold Seal and together they planted the first commercially successful vinifera vineyards in the east. In 1958 Frank bought a plot of land on the west side of Keuka Lake, about six miles from Hammondsport, NY. The first vintage released was in 1962 with a Trockenbeerenauslese Johannisberg Riesling made from botrytized grapes. A scientist at heart, Frank, in the twenty-three years that he owned his winery, planted over sixty different varieties to prove to the world that the eastern United States could grow the noble European vinifera grape varieties.

After establishing his reputation, he was a consultant to the Gold Seal Winery and established a Vitis vinifera grape nursery. He urged New York State winemakers to move away from native North American grapes, including Vitis labrusca and other species, and instead plant Vitis vinifera, the traditional grapes of European winemakers.

== Later years ==
Frank trained interested students in informal internships. He called his students "cooperators." The cooperators included Douglas Moorhead of Presque Isle Wine Cellars, Arnulf Esterer of Markko Vineyard, Hamilton Mowbray of Montbray Cellars, Elizabeth Furness of Piedmont Vineyards, and George Matheson of Chicama Vineyards.

In 1985, Frank died at the age of 86. His legacy is cherished in New York, paving the way for other Finger Lakes producers to grow the European grape varieties. In November 2001, Konstantin Frank was inducted into the Wine Spectator Hall of Fame for his outstanding achievements in the field of viticulture.

Konstantin's son, Willy Frank, became president after his father's death and surprised some in the industry by introducing sparkling wines made in the traditional methode champenoise technique. He purchased a historic field stone house, then restored it into a sparkling winery and named it Chateau Frank. In 1993, Fred Frank, Konstantin's grandson, succeeded his father as President of Dr. Konstantin Frank Vinifera Wine Cellars. That same year, he introduced a value line called "Salmon Run" using grapes sourced from local farms around the Finger Lakes.

== See also ==
- American wine
- List of wine personalities
- New York wine
