= Cigar Aficionado =

American cigar magazine

- November 2017, cover featuring Michael Jordan and highlighting the magazine's 25th anniversary
- Editor and publisher: Marvin R. Shanken
- Categories: Cigar culture, lifestyle
- First issue: Fall 1992
- Company: M. Shanken Communications
- Country: United States
- Based in: New York City
- Language: English
- Website: www.cigaraficionado.com
- ISSN: 1063-7885

Cigar Aficionado is an American lifestyle magazine that is dedicated to enjoying the “good life” and the world of cigars. It is a publication of M. Shanken Communications, which also publishes Wine Spectator, Whisky Advocate, Market Watch, Shanken News Daily and IMPACT Newsletter.

The magazine reaches a total brand footprint of over 2.7 million.

Launched in 1992, the magazine is known for its profiles on celebrities, including Michael Jordan, Jack Nicholson, The Rock, Demi Moore, Robert De Niro, Arnold Schwarzenegger, Usher, Nick Jonas, Tom Selleck, Hugh Jackman, Wayne Gretzky, Charles Barkley, Mark Wahlberg, Michael Strahan, and Steve Harvey; for its cigar ratings and reviews; and the latest coverage on cigars, Cuba, gambling, golf, beer, spirits, and more.

David Savona is the executive editor.

== Origins and history ==
Cigar Aficionado magazine debuted in the fall of 1992, launched in New York City by Marvin R. Shanken, longtime publisher of Wine Spectator magazine. Prior to launching the publication, Shanken engaged in extensive market research, collecting more than 1,300 four-page surveys of cigar smokers which detailed their occupation, income, net worth, travel tendencies, as well as their drinking and smoking habits. Survey results revealed a well-heeled and dedicated male demographic, with survey respondents professing an average household income of $194,000 and a net worth of $1.54 million and claiming to smoke on average ten cigars per week. Shanken launched a large-format glossy magazine aimed at corralling these readers and advertisers of products targeted to this audience.

Cigar Aficionado began as a lifestyle magazine, including coverage of wine, spirits, travel, gambling, and antiques, in addition to interviews with leading personalities in the cigar industry and feature articles relating to the cigarmaking industry. From the beginning the magazine emphasized celebrity profiles, including cover stories on Rush Limbaugh, Jack Nicholson, and Arnold Schwarzenegger. The new magazine's successful blending of lifestyle reports and celebrity glitz has been credited with contributing to the 1990s cigar boom.

The publication scored its first great journalistic coup on February 4, 1994, when editor and publisher Shanken met Fidel Castro in Havana for a two-hour interview. During this interview Castro recounted the story behind the establishment of the Cohiba brand, told stories of the importance of cigars to his life as a revolutionary in the mountains of Cuba, and explained his decision to give up cigar smoking in August 1986 as part of a national campaign against tobacco use. In addition to these topics of special interest to cigar smokers, the interview touched upon bilateral relations between the United States and Cuba, during the course of which Castro accused the United States of repeatedly "moving the goalposts back" for ending the Cuban economic embargo and said that "no other country has as unblemished behavior about human rights" as Cuba.

A 2001 content analysis in the ''Tobacco Control'' journal concluded that ''Cigar Aficionado'' combined product, lifestyle and industry promotions in the magazine and linked the publication to cigar-related events. The study also reported that in 34% of the articles celebrities appeared and only 1% of articles were primarily focused on health effects of cigars.

A 2024 study in "Tobacco Prevention & Cessation" examined all six bimonthly 2023 issues of "Cigar Aficionado" and reported 276 advertisements and 133 articles across the year, with cigars and alcohol among the most common advertising topics and cigars, reviews/spotlights, and celebrities among the most common article topics.

== Events ==
Cigar Aficionado hosts the annual Big Smoke Las Vegas, which has drawn cigar-loving visitors from around the world since the early 90s, when Marvin R. Shanken held the first Big Smoke event, which took place in New York City. Big Smoke attendees enjoy premium cigars, spirits and food, and participate in cigar and tasting seminars.

Cigar Aficionado and sister publication Whisky Advocate together co-host Big Smoke Meets WhiskyFest, an annual event held in Hollywood, Florida since 2021.

== Ratings ==
From its inception, Cigar Aficionado has made use of blind taste testing of cigars, comparing the merits of one brand to another, expressed on the basis of a 100-point scale similar to the one used in sister publication Wine Spectator.

The publication annually releases its Top 25 list, where editors select the best cigars of the year. The full list and rankings are a product of a year-long journey and hundreds of reviewed cigars. The Top 25 includes the Cigar of the Year honor.

=== Cigar of the Year ===
Year	Cigar	Rating	Factory Location	Ref.
2024	My Father the Judge Grand Robusto	98	Nicaragua	
2023	Fuente Fuente OpusX Reserva d'Chateau	97	Dominican Republic	
2022	H. Upmann No. 2	98	Cuba	
2021	Padrón 1964 Anniversary Series Torpedo	97	Nicaragua	
2020	E.P. Carrillo Pledge Prequel	98	Dominican Republic	
2019	Aging Room Quattro Nicaragua Maestro	96	Nicaragua	
2018	E.P. Carrillo Encore Majestic	96	Dominican Republic	
2017	Arturo Fuente Don Carlos Eye of the Shark	97	Dominican Republic	
2016	La Flor Dominicana Andalusian Bull	96	Dominican Republic	
2015	My Father Le Bijou 1922 Torpedo Box Pressed	97	Nicaragua	
2014	Oliva Serie V Melanio Figurado	96	Nicaragua	
2013	Montecristo No. 2	96	Cuba	
2012	Flor de las Antillas Toro	96	Nicaragua	
2011	Alec Bradley Prensado Churchill	96	Honduras	
2010	Cohiba Behike BHK 52	97	Cuba	
2009	Padrón Family Reserve No. 45 Maduro	95	Nicaragua	
2008	Casa Magna Colorado Robusto	93	Nicaragua	
2007	Padrón Serie 1926 No. 9	97	Nicaragua	
2006	Bolivar Royal Corona	94	Cuba	
2005	Fuente Fuente OpusX Double Corona	95	Dominican Republic	
2004	Padrón Serie 1926 40th Anniversary	93	Nicaragua	

== See also ==
- Tobacco
