= NASCAR Truck Series at Nashville Superspeedway =

NASCAR Craftsman Truck Series races at Nashville Superspeedway

NASCAR Truck Series
- Venue: Nashville Superspeedway
- Location: Lebanon, Tennessee, United States

Circuit information
- Surface: Concrete
- Length: 1.333 mi (2.145 km)
- Turns: 4

Pickup truck racing events in the NASCAR Truck Series have been held at Nashville Superspeedway, in Lebanon, Tennessee during numerous seasons and times of year since 2001.

== Current race ==
Allegiance 200

NASCAR Truck Series
- Venue: Nashville Superspeedway
- Corporate sponsor: Allegiance Flag Supply
- First race: 2001
- Distance: 199.5 miles (321.1 km)
- Laps: 150; Stage 1: 45; Stage 2: 50; Final stage: 55
- Previous names: Federated Auto Parts 200 (2001–2003); Toyota Tundra 200 (2004–2009); Nashville 200 (2010); Lucas Deep Clean 200 (2011); Rackley Roofing 200 (2021–2025)
- Most wins (driver): Johnny Benson Jr. Ryan Preece (2)
- Most wins (team): Roush Fenway Racing; Bill Davis Racing; David Gilliland Racing (2)
- Most wins (manufacturer): Chevrolet (7)

The Allegiance 200 is a NASCAR Truck Series race held at Nashville Superspeedway in Lebanon, Tennessee. Layne Riggs is the defending race winner.

=== History ===
The event replaced a race that was held on the same date at nearby Nashville Speedway USA (also known as the Nashville Fairgrounds Speedway) from 1996 to 2000. The race had been held in August during its entire first run on the Truck Series schedule, except for 2011 when it was moved to July. The track was shut down in 2012 and as a result, the race was removed from the schedule along with the track's second race in the spring, which had been held in 2010 and 2011.

The Truck Series—joining the Cup and Xfinity Series—returned to the speedway in 2021. Rackley Roofing was announced as the race's title sponsor in March of that year.

For the 2026 edition, Flote.com was originally the new title sponsor on December 3, 2025, replacing Rackley Roofing but on May 15, 2026, Allegiance Flag Supply was named the new title sponsor.

=== Past winners ===
Year	Date	No.	Driver	Team	Manufacturer	Race distance		Race time	Average speed (mph)	Report	Ref
Year	Date	No.	Driver	Team	Manufacturer	Laps	Miles (km)	Race time	Average speed (mph)	Report	Ref
2001	August 10	2	Scott Riggs	Ultra Motorsports	Dodge	150	199.95 (321.788)	1:30:34	132.466	Report	
2002	August 10	16	Mike Bliss	Xpress Motorsports	Chevrolet	151*	201.283 (323.933)	1:33:18	129.442	Report	
2003	August 8	99	Carl Edwards	Roush Racing	Ford	150	199.95 (321.788)	1:32:36	129.557	Report	
2004	August 14	4	Bobby Hamilton	Bobby Hamilton Racing	Dodge	150	199.95 (321.788)	1:36:42	124.068	Report	
2005	August 13	17	David Reutimann	Darrell Waltrip Motorsports	Toyota	150	199.95 (321.788)	1:49:49	109.246	Report	
2006	August 12	23	Johnny Benson Jr.	Bill Davis Racing	Toyota	151*	201.283 (323.933)	1:51:06	108.704	Report	
2007	August 11	6	Travis Kvapil	Roush Fenway Racing	Ford	150	199.95 (321.788)	1:36:40	124.107	Report	
2008	August 9	23	Johnny Benson Jr.	Bill Davis Racing	Toyota	150	199.95 (321.788)	1:44:03	115.3	Report	
2009	August 1	33	Ron Hornaday Jr.	Kevin Harvick Inc.	Chevrolet	154*	205.282 (330.369)	1:44:19	115.006	Report	
2010	August 7	30	Todd Bodine	Germain Racing	Toyota	150	199.95 (321.788)	1:36:33	124.257	Report	
2011	July 22	3	Austin Dillon	Richard Childress Racing	Chevrolet	150	199.95 (321.788)	1:31:25	131.214	Report	
2012 – 2020	Not held										
2021	June 18	17	Ryan Preece	David Gilliland Racing	Ford	150	199.95 (321.788)	1:44:25	114.637	Report	
2022	June 24	17	Ryan Preece	David Gilliland Racing	Ford	150	199.95 (321.788)	1:56:32	102.717	Report	
2023	June 23	42	Carson Hocevar	Niece Motorsports	Chevrolet	150	199.95 (321.788)	1:57:16	102.075	Report	
2024	June 28	19	Christian Eckes	McAnally–Hilgemann Racing	Chevrolet	150	199.95 (321.788)	1:57:33	101.829	Report	
2025	May 30	71	Rajah Caruth	Spire Motorsports	Chevrolet	150	199.95 (322.788)	1:42:40	116.591	Report	
2026	May 29–30*	34	Layne Riggs	Front Row Motorsports	Ford	150	199.95 (321.788)	1:59:45	99.958	Report	
2027	June 4									Report	

- 2002, 2006 & 2009: Race extended due to a green–white–checkered finish.

== Second race ==
Bully Hill Vineyards 200
NASCAR Camping World Truck Series
- Venue: Nashville Superspeedway
- Corporate sponsor: Bully Hill Vineyards
- First race: 2010
- Last race: 2011
- Distance: 199.95 miles (321.788 km)
- Laps: 150
- Previous names: Nashville 200 (2010); Bully Hill Vineyards 200 (2011)
- Most wins (driver): Kyle Busch (2)
- Most wins (team): Kyle Busch Motorsports (2)
- Most wins (manufacturer): Toyota (2)

The Bully Hill Vineyards 200 was a second NASCAR Camping World Truck Series race that was held at Nashville Superspeedway on Good Friday.

=== History ===
For the 2010 and 2011 seasons, it was the first of two Camping World Truck Series events held in Nashville, the second being the Lucas Deep Clean 200, which was held in July.

2010 marked the inaugural event of the Nashville 200. In October 2009, the parent company of the Superspeedway, Dover Motorsports, Inc. announced that it would be closing Memphis Motorsports Park, which was previously scheduled to host a Truck Series race on June 26. It was announced shortly afterward that the Memphis race would be replaced with a second race at Nashville. The race, which was scheduled for April 2, would mark the opening race of a doubleheader with the Nationwide Series, which would race the following day at the track.

With the first race, Nashville Superspeedway would become the only race track on the schedule to host two Truck Series races and not host a NASCAR Sprint Cup Series event. The race was only run twice, as the track was shut down following the 2011 season. Kyle Busch, driving a Toyota for Kyle Busch Motorsports, won the event both years it was held.

=== Past winners ===
Year	Date	No.	Driver	Teams	Manufacturer	Race Distance		Race Time	Average Speed (mph)	Report	Ref
Year	Date	No.	Driver	Teams	Manufacturer	Laps	Miles (km)	Race Time	Average Speed (mph)	Report	Ref
2010	April 2	18	Kyle Busch	Kyle Busch Motorsports	Toyota	150	199.95 (321.788)	1:27:55	136.459	Report	
2011	April 22	18	Kyle Busch	Kyle Busch Motorsports	Toyota	150	199.95 (321.788)	1:40:27	119.433	Report	

== Multiple winners ==
=== Drivers ===
# Wins	Driver	Years won
2	Johnny Benson Jr.	2006, 2008
2	Kyle Busch	2010 (Race 1 of 2), 2011 (Race 1 of 2)
2	Ryan Preece	2021, 2022

=== Teams ===
# Wins	Team	Years won
2	Roush Fenway Racing	2003, 2007
2	Bill Davis Racing	2006, 2008
2	Kyle Busch Motorsports	2010 (Race 1 of 2), 2011 (Race 1 of 2)
2	David Gilliland Racing	2021, 2022

=== Manufacturer ===
# Wins	Make	Years won
7	(United States) Chevrolet	2002, 2009, 2011 (Race 2 of 2), 2023-2026
6	(Japan) Toyota	2005, 2006, 2008, 2010 (both races), 2011 (Race 1 of 2)
5	(United States) Ford	2003, 2007, 2021, 2022, 2026
2	(United States) Dodge	2001, 2004

Previous race: North Carolina Education Lottery 200	NASCAR Craftsman Truck Series; Allegiance 200	Next race: TBA
