= Fearless Critic =

US publishing house

Fearless Critic's San Antonio Restaurant Guide, published in 2011

Fearless Critic Media is a US publishing house best known for its books The Wine Trials, The Beer Trials, and the Fearless Critic series of restaurant guidebooks to US cities. The publishing house was founded in 2004, merged with Workman in 2008, and currently has eight restaurant guides in print—Austin, Texas, Houston, Texas, Dallas, Texas, San Antonio, Texas, Seattle, Washington, Portland, Oregon, Washington, D.C., and New Haven, Connecticut. In 2014, Fearless Critic launched a new nonfiction imprint whose first title will be the March 2015 hardcover Blind Taste: A Defense of Fast Food & Cheap Beer, by Robin Goldstein, author of The Wine Trials. Fearless Critic books are distributed by IPG.

== Rating system ==
The Fearless Critic restaurant guide series uses a 10-point rating scale (1.0 to 10.0). In 2007, with the Houston guide, the series experimented with a letter grading system (from A+ to D−), but has since moved back to the original 10-point scale.

== Series name change ==
The Fearless Critic restaurant guide series was called "The Menu" until 2005. Older titles in the Northeast US still bear "The Menu" title.

== Controversy over ratings ==
Fearless Critic has incited debate on food boards such as Chowhound over its harsh ratings.

== The Wine Trials ==
Fearless Critic's nonfiction polemic book The Wine Trials, by Robin Goldstein, sparked debate over its claim that non-expert wine drinkers preferred cheap bottles to more expensive bottles in scientific blind tastings. It went on to sell more than 100,000 copies in three editions, becoming the world's bestselling guide to cheap wine.

== Wine Spectator Award of Excellence controversy ==
On August 15, 2008, Wine Trials author Robin Goldstein revealed that he had submitted an application for a Wine Spectator Award of Excellence for an imaginary restaurant in Milan, which he named "Osteria L'Intrepido" ("Fearless Restaurant"), and that the non-existent restaurant had won the award. The expose was reported widely across the media and blogosphere.

== See also ==
- Zagat Survey
- Restaurant rating
- Michelin Guide
- Wine Spectator
