= Robin Goldstein =

American writer

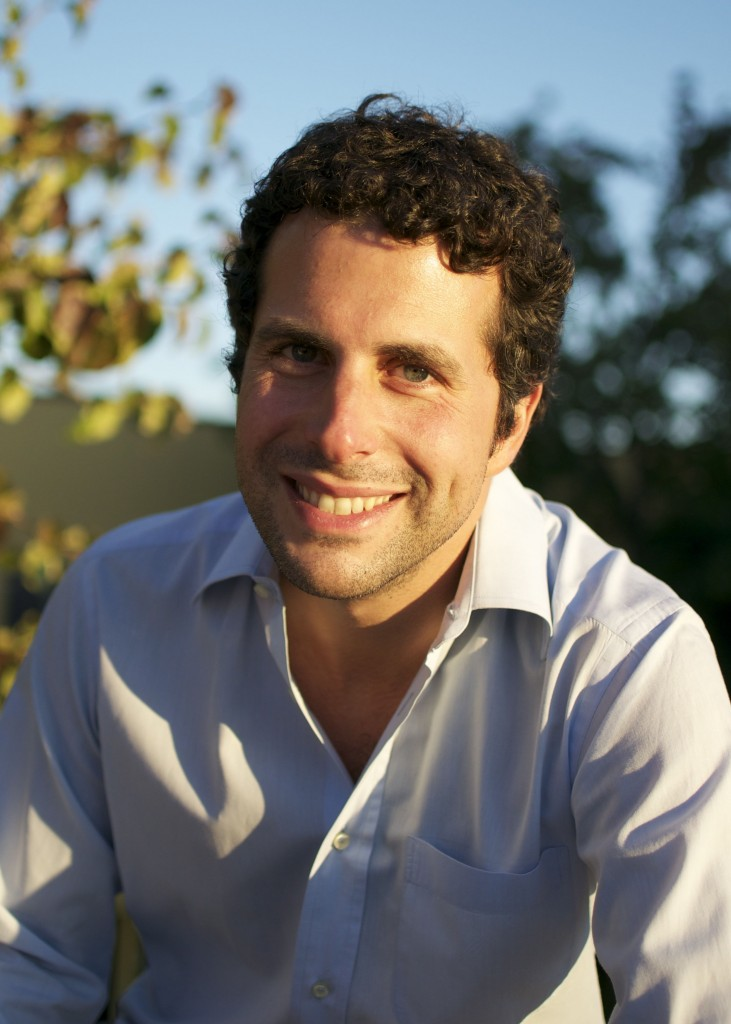
- Born: Robin Stubbs Goldstein; November 18, 1976 (age 50); New York, New York, U.S.
- Education: Harvard University (BA); Yale University (JD); University of Bordeaux (PhD)
- Occupation: Author
- Website: blindtaste.com

Robin Goldstein is an American author, food and wine critic, and economics pundit. He is known for his books and articles questioning conventional wisdom and pricing in the food and wine industries, particularly a widely publicized exposé of Wine Spectator magazine, and for his writing on the Freakonomics blog. He is author of several books, including The Wine Trials and The Beer Trials. Goldstein was also one of the subjects of Think Like a Freak, the 2014 book by Freakonomics authors Steven Levitt and Stephen Dubner.

Goldstein is currently on the research faculty of the University of California, where he is Principal Economic Counselor at the UC Agricultural Issues Center in Davis and studies cannabis prices and the market impacts of cannabis regulations. He lives in Oakland, California.

In 2005, after having reviewed restaurants and hotels for Fodor's Travel Guides in Italy, Mexico, Argentina, Thailand, and Hong Kong, Goldstein founded the Fearless Critic series of restaurant guides, which was later acquired by Workman Publishing in New York and became a Workman imprint.

== Education ==
Goldstein received an AB in Neuroscience and Philosophy from Harvard, a JD from Yale Law School, and a PhD in economics from the University of Bordeaux. He also graduated from the French Culinary Institute and the WSET wine program.

== Wine Spectator Award of Excellence controversy ==
At the August 2008 conference of the American Association of Wine Economists in Portland, Oregon, Goldstein revealed that in a hoax exposé, he had won a Wine Spectator "Award of Excellence" for an imaginary restaurant, Osteria L'Intrepido (Italian for "the fearless tavern"). With the help of his friend Giuliano Stiglitz, he created a fake website for the restaurant, submitted a reserve wine list of low-rated Italian wines along with the $250 entry fee, and won the award, which he sought to expose as a form of advertising. The hoax garnered worldwide press. Wine Spectator Editor-in-Chief Thomas Matthews responded on the magazine's web site.

== The Wine Trials experiment ==
In May 2008, Goldstein revealed the results of an experiment that he conducted in which 500 subjects, in a blind taste test, preferred cheaper wine to more expensive wine. The results were published in an academic paper entitled "Do More Expensive Wines Taste Better?" followed by a book entitled The Wine Trials.

Some wine critics and aficionados questioned Goldstein's conclusions, and a staff editorial in the Boston Globe criticized his findings.

== Works by Goldstein ==
=== Books ===
- Can Legal Weed Win?, University of California Press, 2022.
- The Wine Trials, Fearless Critic Media/Workman, 2008.
- The Beer Trials, Fearless Critic Media/Workman, 2010.

=== Articles ===
- "Can People Distinguish Pâté from Dog Food? "
- "Do More Expensive Wines Taste Better?"
