= Charles Fournier (winemaker) =

French winemaker (1902–1983)

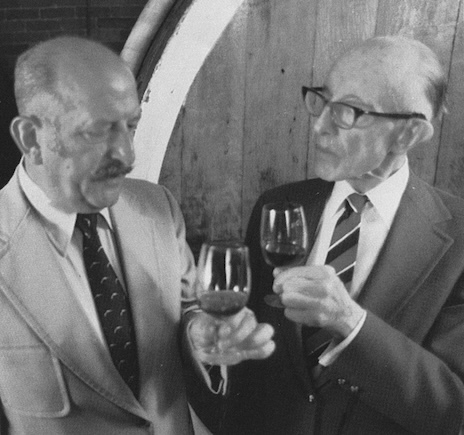
- Guy Devaux and Charles Fournier, Gold Seal's French wine masters.
- Born: June 15, 1902; Cambrai, France
- Died: 1983 (aged 80–81)
- Education: University of Paris
- Occupation: Winemaker

Charles Marchant Fournier (1902-1983) was a French winemaker and winery executive at the Gold Seal Winery.

== Early life and education ==
He was born in Cambrai, France on June 15, 1902. His parents were Alfred and Antoinette (Marchant) Fournier. He attended the University of Paris 1919-1922 and received a degree in Chemistry, after which he attended several wine schools in France and Switzerland.

== Winemaking ==
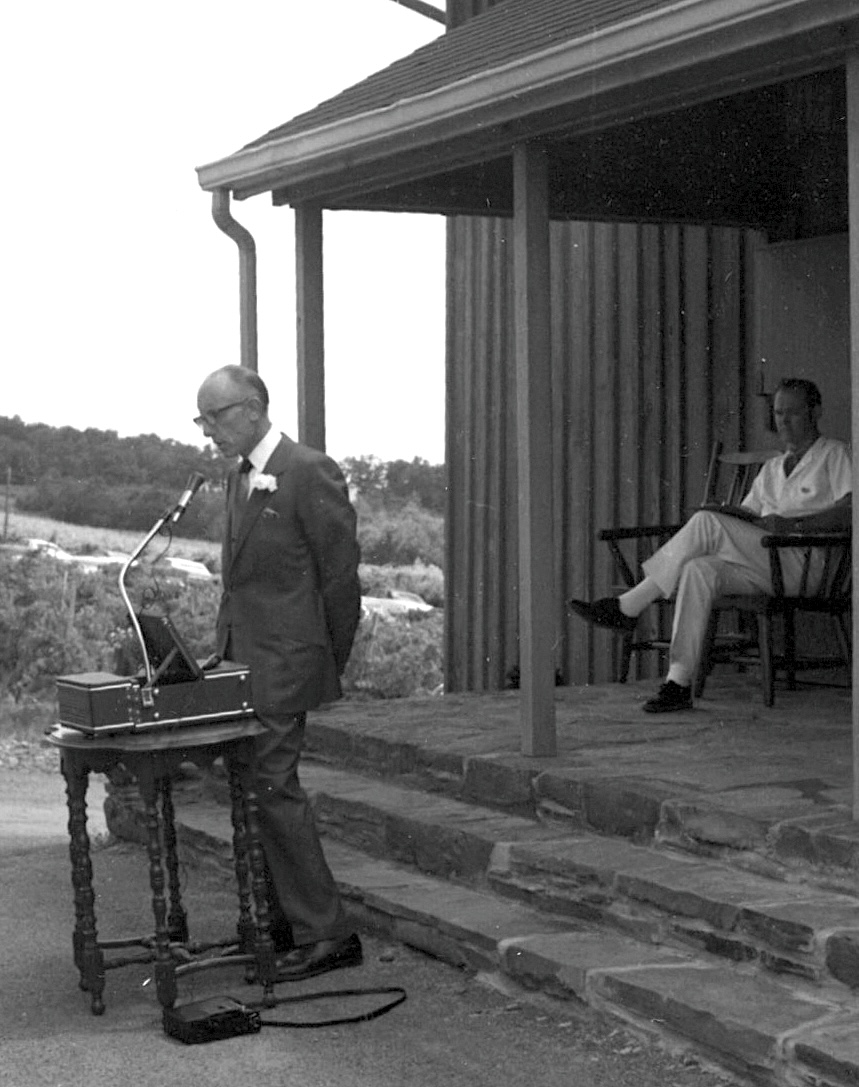
Charles Fournier and Walter S. Taylor honoring Charles Champlin, champagne expert, at the Finger Lakes Wine Museum, 1970

He was the chief winemaker and production manager at Venue Cliquot Ponsardin. In 1934, Edward Stewart Underhill, the president of the Urbana Wine Company in the Finger Lakes region of New York, asked Fournier to recommend to him someone who could come to America and restore Gold Seal to its pre-prohibition greatness. Fournier took the job himself and moved to New York, he was made a US Citizen and became the production manager of the Urbana Wine Company. He brought with him his own champagne yeast culture from Veuve Clicquot.

In the 1930s, Charles Fournier created a Pink Catawba wine that restored Gold Seal to its pre-Prohibition greatness. He was one the first enologues to experiment with French hybrid grapes in the United States, and with the assistance of Dr. Konstantin Frank, he started experiments with grafted vinifera vines (European type grapes) on native New York State rootstock. The climate in New York was long considered too hostile to the growing of Vitis vinifera grapes. The experiments were a success and Gold Seal went on to produce many European type grapes in its vineyards and in 1960, Gold Seal sold the first commercial vinifera wines in New York. Additionally, it produced a Riesling Spatlese ("late harvest"), which, at the time, was one of the only ones made in this country with the German Riesling grape.

At the 1950 California State fair international wine competition the Charles Fournier New York State Brut Champagne won the only gold medal, and this upset was so unsettling to the California winemakers that no out-of-state wines were invited to the State Fair competition again.

Fournier was an instructor and lecturer at the School of Hotel Administration at Cornell University. He was a member of Association of Official Agricultural Chemists, American Chemical Society, Institute of Food Technologists, American Society of Enologists, Finger Lakes Wine Growers Association, Director of Bottle Fermented Champagne Producers Association and a past president of the Hammondsport Rotary Club. (Finger Lakes Wine Museum archives)
