= Marvin Shanken =

American publisher (1943–2026)

Marvin R. Shanken
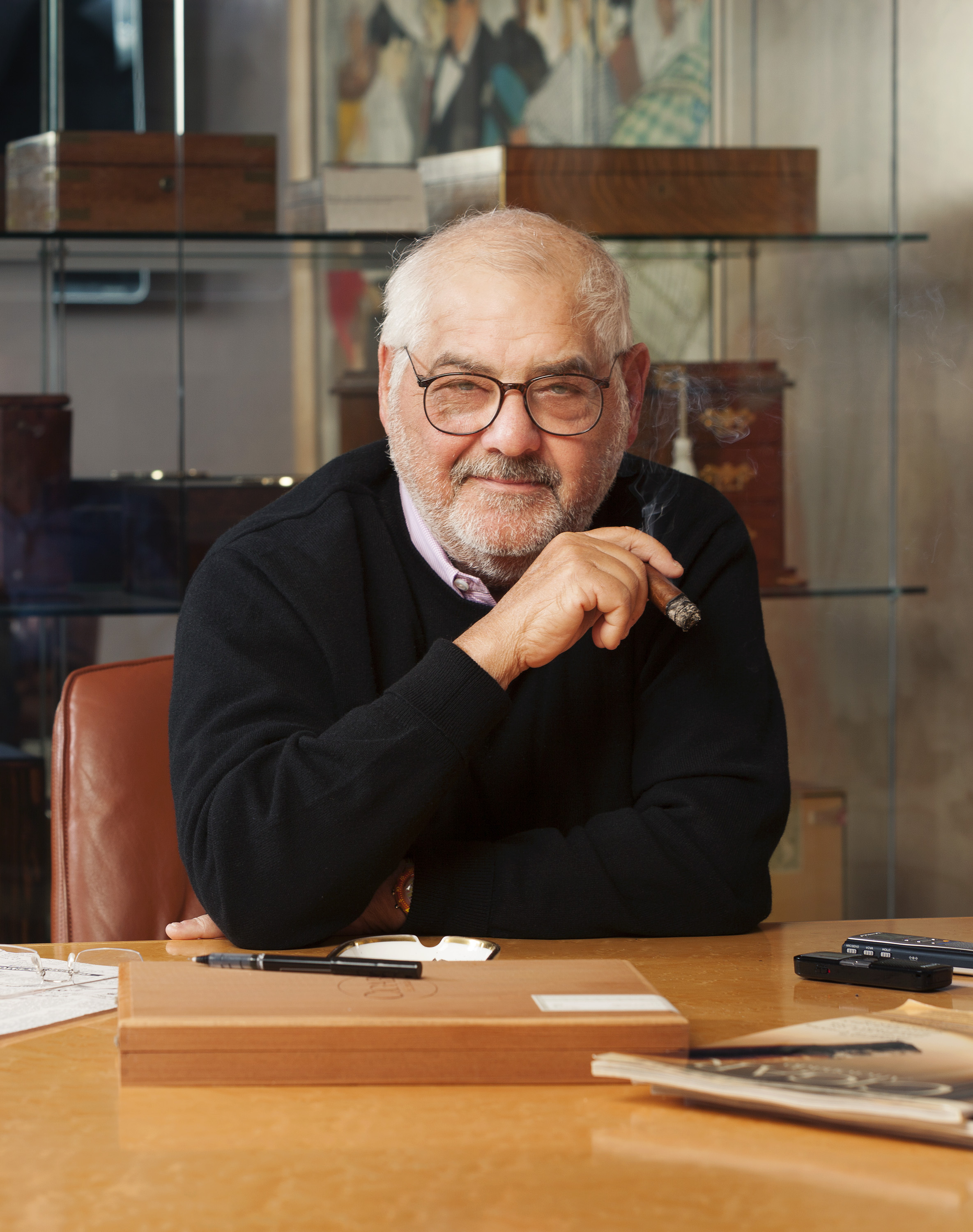
- Shanken in 2012
- Born: October 4, 1943; New Haven, Connecticut, U.S.
- Died: October 29, 2026 (aged 83); New York City, U.S.
- Education: University of Miami (BBA); American University (MBA)
- Occupations: Publisher; Editor
- Title: Founder & Chairman, M. Shanken Communications

Marvin Ray Shanken (October 4, 1943 – October 29, 2026) was an American publisher and founder of M. Shanken Communications. Shanken's roster of lifestyle publications includes Wine Spectator, Cigar Aficionado and Whisky Advocate. Shanken was editor and publisher of each of the three publications. Based in Manhattan, M. Shanken Communications has offices in Napa, California, and Emmaus, Pennsylvania.

== Life and career ==
=== Early life, education and entry into publishing ===
Shanken was born on October 4, 1943, in New Haven, Connecticut, where he also grew up. He received an undergraduate BBA degree in 1965 from the University of Miami, and then an MBA at American University in 1968.

He started his career in real estate and investment banking, then moved into publishing in 1973, purchasing Impact, a small wine and spirits industry newsletter, before expanding to other trade publications including Market Watch, Shanken News Daily and Impact Newsletter. In 1979, he purchased Wine Spectator a few years after its 1976 founding, and launched Cigar Aficionado in September 1992. In 2010, Whisky Advocate was added to the Shanken portfolio.

Shanken later went on to spearhead Wine Spectator’s entry to the digital world, with mobile apps including Wine Spectator WineRatings+ and Wine Spectator Restaurant Awards.

=== High-profile interviews ===
Shanken interviewed leaders, artists and celebrities for Cigar Aficionado, including Fidel Castro (1994), Francis Ford Coppola (2003), General Tommy Franks (2003), Arnon Milchan (2008), Michael Jordan (2005, 2017), Robert De Niro (2015), Alex Rodriguez (2018), Dwayne "The Rock" Johnson (2020), Mark Wahlberg (2023), Arnold Schwarzenegger (2023) and Bret Baier (2024).

In 2020, Shanken's video interview with Michael Jordan was released. To date, it has been seen by over 8 million viewers. Shanken revealed to GQ details behind his two Cigar Aficionado cover story interviews with Jordan, who rarely talks to the press.

In 2022, Wine Spectator released a video interview, filmed in 1999, between Shanken and the famously private Ernest Gallo, co-founder of E & J Gallo Winery. The interview was filmed on Gallo's 90th birthday.

In 2023, Shanken committed to a five-part series, featuring wine industry icons, for Wine Spectator. The purpose of the series is to explore and preserve the icons' rich legacies. As of September 2024, four of the parts have been completed: Chuck Wagner of Caymus Vineyards in Napa; Angelo Gaja of Italy; Piero Antinori of Italy; Christian Moueix of Bordeaux and Napa. The final interview, with Bill Harlan of Harlan Estate in Napa, was expected by end of 2024.

=== Reader and industry focused events ===
Shanken was one of the first magazine publishers to host reader-focused events, with the launches of the New York Wine Experience in 1981, WhiskyFest in 1998 and the Big Smoke in 1993.

The annual Impact Marketing Seminar for wine and spirits industry leaders from around the world began in 1977 and has featured speakers such as Bill Clinton, George W. Bush, Henry Kissinger, Dick Cheney, Rudy Giuliani, Michael Milken, Ron DeSantis, Michael Strahan, Bret Baier, Abba Eban, Madeleine Albright, John R. Bolton, Newt Gingrich, Tommy Franks, Helmut Schmidt and Walter Cronkite.

=== Later life and death ===
In 2021, M. Shanken Communications published a special 50th anniversary issue, whose contents included an interview with Marvin R. Shanken, the origins of M. Shanken Communications, a history of the U.S. drinks market, a history of the cigar industry and a look at the future of wine and spirits in America.

In 2019, Shanken News Daily launched its Cannabis Edition, a weekly newsletter covering the cannabis market, with a special focus on the movements of major drinks industry companies.

Shanken married his wife, Hazel Rudy Shanken, in 1981. Shanken and Hazel collected French poster art from the 1890s to WWI, the era of Toulouse-Lautrec. The collection is showcased in a 1990 book by Jack Rennert, Wine Spectator's Posters of the Belle Epoque (LCCN 90-60771).

Shanken died of glioblastoma in New York City on October 29, 2026, at the age of 83.

== Philanthropy and community involvement ==
=== Charity events ===
Shanken was the creator of several annual charity events including Wine Spectator's New York Wine Experience (started in 1981); Cigar Aficionado's Night to Remember dinner for prostate cancer (1993); and the Els for Autism Pro-Am Golf Tournament (2010). Combined, the events have raised more than $75 million. The monies have been donated to a multitude of charities.

=== Wine Spectator Scholarship Foundation ===
Shanken was also founder of the Wine Spectator Scholarship Foundation. In 2021, the Foundation made a record $10 million commitment to Napa Valley College to support the construction and expansion of the college's Viticulture, Wine and Technology program teaching spaces, which will be named the Wine Spectator Wine Education Complex at Napa Valley College.

As of 2024, $3.6 million in scholarships and research grants has been granted to students at the University of California at Davis's Department of Viticulture and Enology.

In 2020, the Foundation contributed $250,000 to World Central Kitchen, the charitable organization led by chef Jose Andres.

In addition, the Foundation donated $3 million to Sonoma State University's Wine Spectator Learning Center, which opened its doors in 2018.

=== Els for Autism Foundation ===
In 2009, Shanken, along with Ernie Els and Liezl Els, founded the Els for Autism Foundation in Jupiter, Florida. With a global mission to transform the lives of people with autism and those who care for them through lifetime services and collaborative partnerships, the Foundation built and runs a school for 300 boys and girls on an expansive 26-acre campus in Jupiter, Florida. Shanken served as Chairman of the Board, with his tenure concluding in 2023. As of 2023, he served as Honorary Chairman. In 2024, Shanken spoke to Golfweek about the foundation, his involvement and the story behind the founding of the annual Els for Autism Pro-Am.

In 2018, the Els for Autism Foundation and the Seaver Autism Center for Research and Treatment at the Icahn School of Medicine at Mount Sinai partnered to create the Seaver Els Institute, a research organization dedicated to helping people on the autism spectrum fulfill their potential to lead positive, productive and rewarding lives.

In 2016, at the annual Els for Autism Pro-Am, Rickie Fowler shot a hole-in-one, resulting in a $1,000,000 donation.

=== Scholarship and organizational activities ===
In 2021, the Marvin and Hazel Shanken DEI Scholarship was announced. The scholarship benefits students pursuing a hospitality education at Florida International University’s Chaplin School of Hospitality and Tourism Management.

Shanken was an Honorary Board Member of the Prostate Cancer Foundation, and was a member of the Board of Trustees of the University of Miami.

In 1988, he was inducted into the Keepers of the Quaich, which was founded that year as a celebration of Scottish culture, tradition and whisky. As of 2023, he served as vice chair of the USA chapter.

== Awards ==
In 2019, Shanken was the recipient of the Lifetime Achievement Award from the MPA, the Association of Magazine Media.

In 2018, he received the Lifetime Achievement Award from Meininger Verlaga—a German media company founded in 1903 specializing in wine and spirits trade publications—for his impact on the global wine industry.

In 2012, he was named among the Who’s Who of Food & Beverage in America by the James Beard Foundation.
