= Walter Stephen Taylor =

American winemaker (1931–2001)

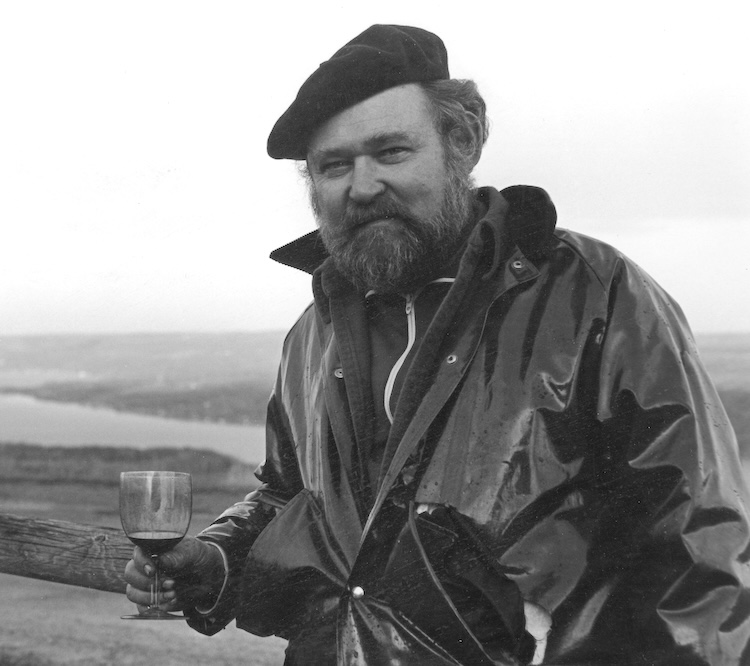
- Born: October 10, 1931; Rochester, New York, U.S.
- Died: April 20, 2001 (aged 69); Hammondsport, New York, U.S.
- Occupation: Winemaker
- Spouse: Lillian Rakic Taylor (m. 1984)

Walter Stephen Taylor (October 10, 1931 – April 20, 2001) was an American winemaker and vineyard owner in the Finger Lakes region of New York. A fourth-generation grape grower and third-generation winemaker, he founded Bully Hill Vineyards in Hammondsport, New York, after leaving an executive position at the Taylor Wine Company, the firm his grandfather had founded. Taylor was known for his public criticism of the practice of blending out-of-state bulk wine and imported grape concentrate into New York wines, and for a prolonged trademark dispute with Taylor Wine Company after its 1977 acquisition by the Coca-Cola Company, which ended with a federal court barring him from using the "Taylor" name as a trademark. He was also a longtime advocate for French-American hybrid grape varieties suited to the region's cold winters.

== Early life ==
Taylor was born in Rochester, New York, on October 10, 1931, the son of Greyton Hoyt Taylor and Muriel Flander Taylor. He was raised in Hammondsport, New York, where his family had grown grapes for several generations; he was the grandson of Walter Taylor, who founded the Taylor Wine Company in 1880. He attended Staunton Military Academy in Virginia, graduating in 1951, and went on to study at Colgate University and the University of Miami's art school before receiving a degree from Alfred State College in 1961.

== Career at Taylor Wine Company ==
In the 1950s, Taylor joined his father in the family business, working largely in sales for Taylor Wine Company's Great Western Division. During this period he and his father, Greyton Taylor, began repurchasing the original family property on Bully Hill, which had been sold decades earlier; in 1958 they bought back the land and began converting it from native American grape varieties to French-American hybrids. Taylor rose to the position of executive vice president of Taylor Wine Company's Great Western Division, a post he held until May 1970, when he was dismissed after publicly criticizing winemaking practices in the New York wine industry.

== Founding of Bully Hill Vineyards ==
Taylor converted his grandfather's barn into a winery and began producing estate-bottled, vintage-dated wines from hybrid and ''Vitis labrusca" grapes. He hired Hermann J. Wiemer, a winemaker trained at the Geisenheim Grape Breeding Institute Hochulschule Geisenheim University Viticultural school in Germany, who joined him in the late 1960s before later starting his own winery. In 1967, he produced his first vintage under the Bully Hill name, and he later established a wine museum on the property dedicated to his father, the museum, Finger Lakes Wine Museum, opened in 1967. Taylor formally incorporated Bully Hill Vineyards, Inc. in 1970 with his father, Greyton Taylor. Under Taylor, Bully Hill grew into one of the largest wineries in New York State, producing roughly 200,000 cases annually by the time of his death.

== Trademark dispute with Taylor Wine Company ==
Taylor was an outspoken critic of the practice of blending bulk wine from California and grape juice concentrate imported from places such as Algeria and South Africa into New York State wines to extend volume and raise alcohol content, a practice he attributed in part to Taylor Wine Company, the firm founded by his grandfather and later taken public.

In 1977, the Coca-Cola Company acquired Taylor Wine Company. Shortly afterward, on August 10, 1977, the U.S. District Court for the Western District of New York issued a preliminary injunction barring Bully Hill Vineyards from using the "Taylor" name or any imitation of it in its labeling, packaging, or advertising, finding that Taylor Wine Company's trademark was likely being infringed. On Monday, August 22, 1977, U.S. District Court Judge John T. Curtin granted a temporary stay of the earlier injunction barring Taylor from using his name on Bully Hill wine. In response, Taylor and his staff used markers to redact the "Taylor" name from existing wine labels rather than undertake a lengthy federal label-approval process; he also obscured ancestral portraits on his labels and distributed bumper stickers reading "Enjoy Bully Hill, the Un-Taylor." He was subsequently held in contempt of court for using the dispute to promote Bully Hill in a manner the court found derisive, and was ordered to surrender the altered labels and related promotional materials; he and his supporters delivered the materials to Taylor Wine Company's headquarters in a manure spreader.

Bully Hill appealed the injunction to the United States Court of Appeals for the Second Circuit, which in January 1978 upheld a finding of likely infringement but found the injunction too broad and remanded the case. On a second appeal, the Second Circuit ruled in December 1978 that neither Bully Hill Vineyards nor Taylor himself could use the "Taylor" name as a trademark, while allowing Bully Hill to acknowledge Taylor's personal connection to the business. Taylor Wine Company has stated that some Bully Hill labels and marketing made misleading claims about the winery's link to the original Taylor estate; the courts' rulings centered on trademark use rather than a finding on the historical claims themselves.

== Advocacy for French-American hybrid grapes ==
Unlike the European ''Vitis vinifera'' grape that dominates winemaking in California and Europe, French-American hybrid grapes were bred to combine the cold-hardiness and disease resistance of native American varieties with the winemaking qualities of European vines, originally developed in France in response to the phylloxera epidemic of the 19th century. Taylor traveled extensively in Europe and became a leading proponent of using these hybrid varieties in New York winemaking, waging what one obituary described as a decades-long campaign on their behalf even as the broader industry shifted toward vinifera plantings. At Bully Hill, he produced wines from French-American hybrid varietals alongside traditional native grapes such as Delaware, Diamond, and Ives.

== Finger Lakes Wine Museum ==
On July 1st, 1967 Taylor opened a Wine Museum on Bully Hill, with a provisional charter from the New York State Education Department. It was the first of its kind in America. Taylor conceived of the idea while traveling through Europe and modeled it on the museums he saw while there. Upon his return he traveled around to old vineyards and wineries in the Finger Lakes, collecting artifacts such as old wine presses, bottling machines, vineyard plows, coopers' tools, wine bottles, early advertisements and books.

== Personal life ==
Walter had several children, including sons Stephen D., Gregory F., and Walter J. Taylor, and a daughter, Margarete Taylor-Toeneboehn; a daughter, Stephanie Grace Taylor, predeceased him in 1983. Taylor married Lillian Rakic Taylor on July 29, 1984. In January 1990, Taylor was left quadriplegic after his van was struck by a truck near Tampa, Florida. He was an artist whose work appeared on many Bully Hill labels, and he served on the advisory board of Colgate University and the board of the National Press Club, among other affiliations.

== Death ==
Taylor died on April 20, 2001, at his home in Hammondsport, New York, of a pulmonary embolism, at age 69. Following his death, his widow, Lillian Rakic Taylor, continued to manage Bully Hill Vineyards.

== Legacy ==
Wine Spectator credited Taylor with helping "put New York wines before a larger public" despite the ultimate decline of French-American hybrids in the marketplace. Bully Hill Vineyards remains in operation in Hammondsport, and Bully Hill Wines can be found in 38 states. The Finger Lakes Wine Museum he founded continues to display artifacts from the history of wine making in the Finger Lakes and the story of the Taylor family's contribution to winemaking in New York and the United States. Walter Stephen Taylor wrote two books, The Home Winemaker's Handbook, co-authored with Richard P. Vine, professor emeritus of enology at Purdue University, and Over Land and Sea.

== Artist ==
Walter S. Taylor was an accomplished artist. He was present at Cape Canaveral for the first launch of the Space Shuttle Columbia on April 12, 1981, STS-1, where he completed a pen and ink drawing of the ignition and launch. Taylor reproduced the sketch on the label of one of Bully Hill’s Vintage 1981 wines, which he named Space Shuttle Rose. He was invited by the National Aeronautics and Space Administration, NASA, to take part in the Space Art Program for NASA. He was on location to sketch the launch of the Space Shuttle Columbia, STS-3, at Cape Canaveral on March 22, 1982.

As a member of the NASA Art Team he was selected to attend the Paris Air Show by NASA. At the Air Show the United States exhibited the Space Shuttle Enterprise. It was flown from Edwards Air Force Base in California to Paris, France, for the Air Show a-top a modified Boeing 747 Jumbo Jet. After the Enterprise left the Paris Air Show, piggy-backing a-top the modified 747, Taylor was taken up in a Rockwell Corp. T-39 jet to make sketches while the Enterprise flew to Rome. Sketches and paintings by Taylor are on display at the national Air and Space Museum in Washington, D.C.
