= Finger Lakes Wine Museum =

Museum in Hammondsport, New York

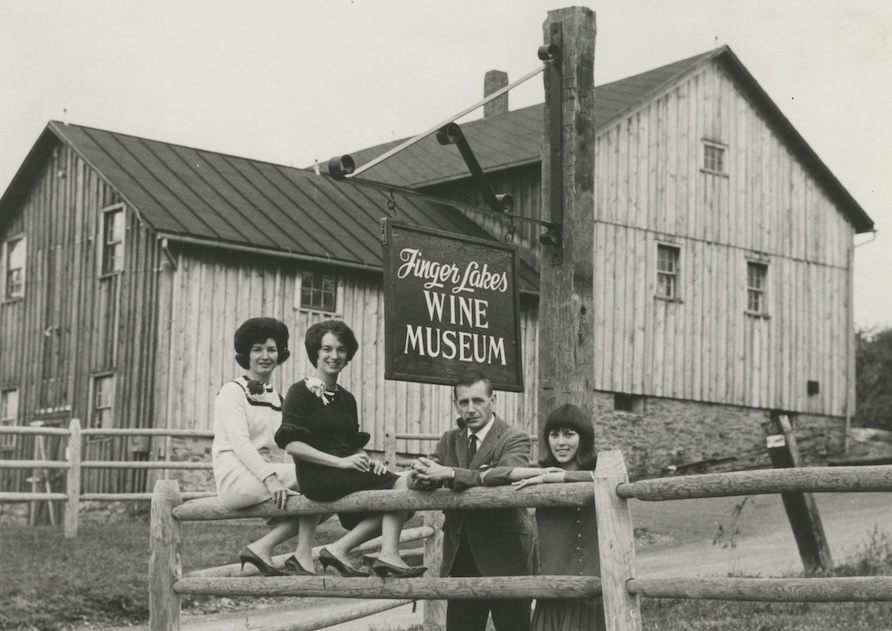
- 1967 promo photo for the museum
- Former name: Greyton H. Taylor Wine Museum
- Established: 1967
- Location: Hammondsport, New York
- Coordinates: 42.4303°N 77.2090°W
- Type: Wine museum
- Founder: Walter S. Taylor

Finger Lakes Wine Museum, also known as the Greyton H. Taylor Wine Museum, was founded in 1967 in Hammondsport, New York. It has a collection of unique artifacts that trace the New York State wine industry's birth in the Finger Lakes. The museum is also home to the Walter S. Taylor Art Gallery.

== History ==
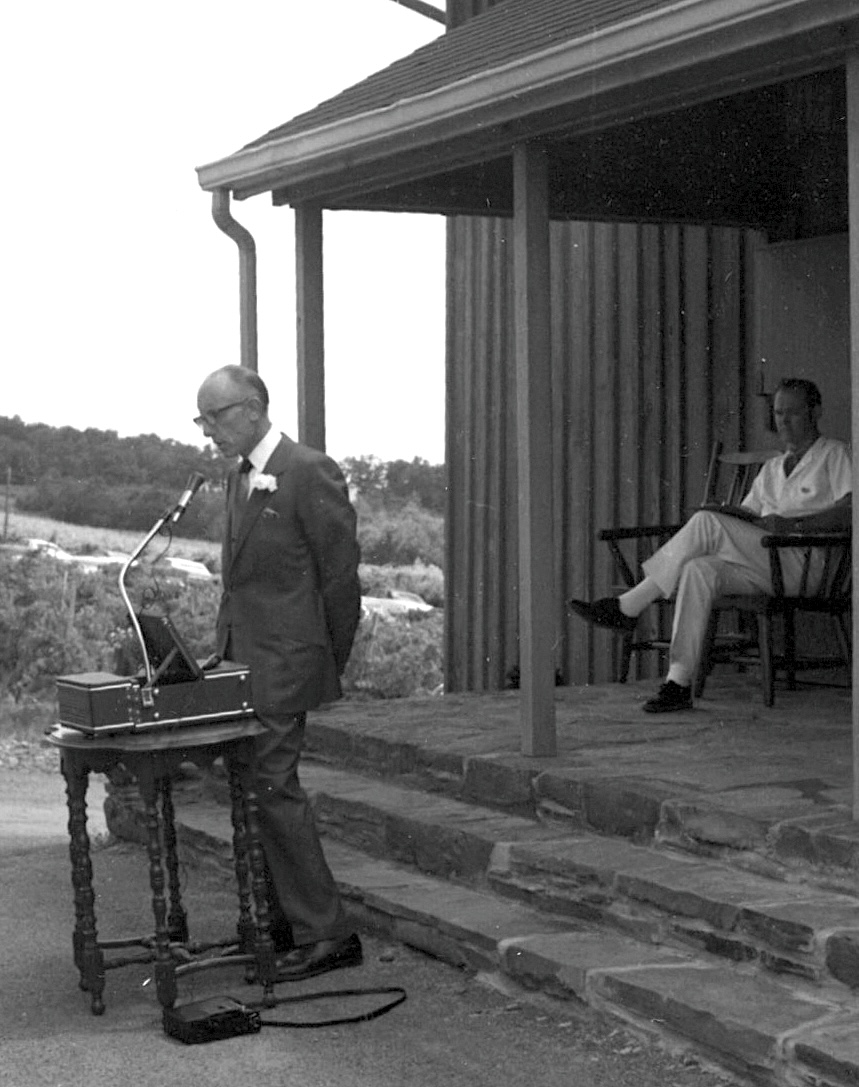
Charles Fournier speaking at the fourth annual dedication of the Finger Lakes Wine Museum. Walter S. Taylor is behind him.

Walter S. Taylor, grandson of Walter Taylor, the founder of Taylor Wine Company, started the museum after visiting similar museums while traveling through Europe. In an effort to document and educate the public on the history of the wine industry in the Finger Lakes region, Walter collected wine presses, pumps, coopers' tools, wine bottles, glasses and other relics from barns, attics, junkyards and antique shops and put them on display in the museum. Walter opened the museum in 1967, on the grounds of the original farm and winery his grandfather, Walter Taylor, started in 1880. The property on Bully Hill had been sold to the Sprague family in 1919, when the founder moved Taylor Wine Company to Hammondsport to gain access to water and electricity. Walter S. Taylor, and his father Greyton H. Taylor repurchased the property forty years later from the same man it was sold to in 1919. The museum received a provisional charter from the New York State Education Department.

== Collection ==
The collection contains notable glassware in the Presidential Glassware Collection, including Abraham Lincoln: wine glasses made by C. Dorflinger of Brooklyn, NY, 1861; Benjamin Harrison "Russian Cut" sherry glass and "Roman Cut" sherry glass, Made by C. Dorflinger & Sons of White Mills, Pennsylvania, c 1890 and 1891; Franklin D. Roosevelt: champagne glass made by T.G. Hawkes & Company of Corning, NY, 1937; John F. Kennedy: glassware made by Morgantown Glass Guild, Morgantown, West Virginia, 1961.

Also on display is a hand-hammered copper brandy pot still, once owned by the Germania Wine & Brandy Co., 1870-1918, that had to close its doors with the coming of Prohibition and failed to re-establish itself after repeal. The museum has an exhibit of lab equipment used in wine making from the 19th and 20th centuries.
