= Gold Seal Winery =

- U.S. National Register of Historic Places
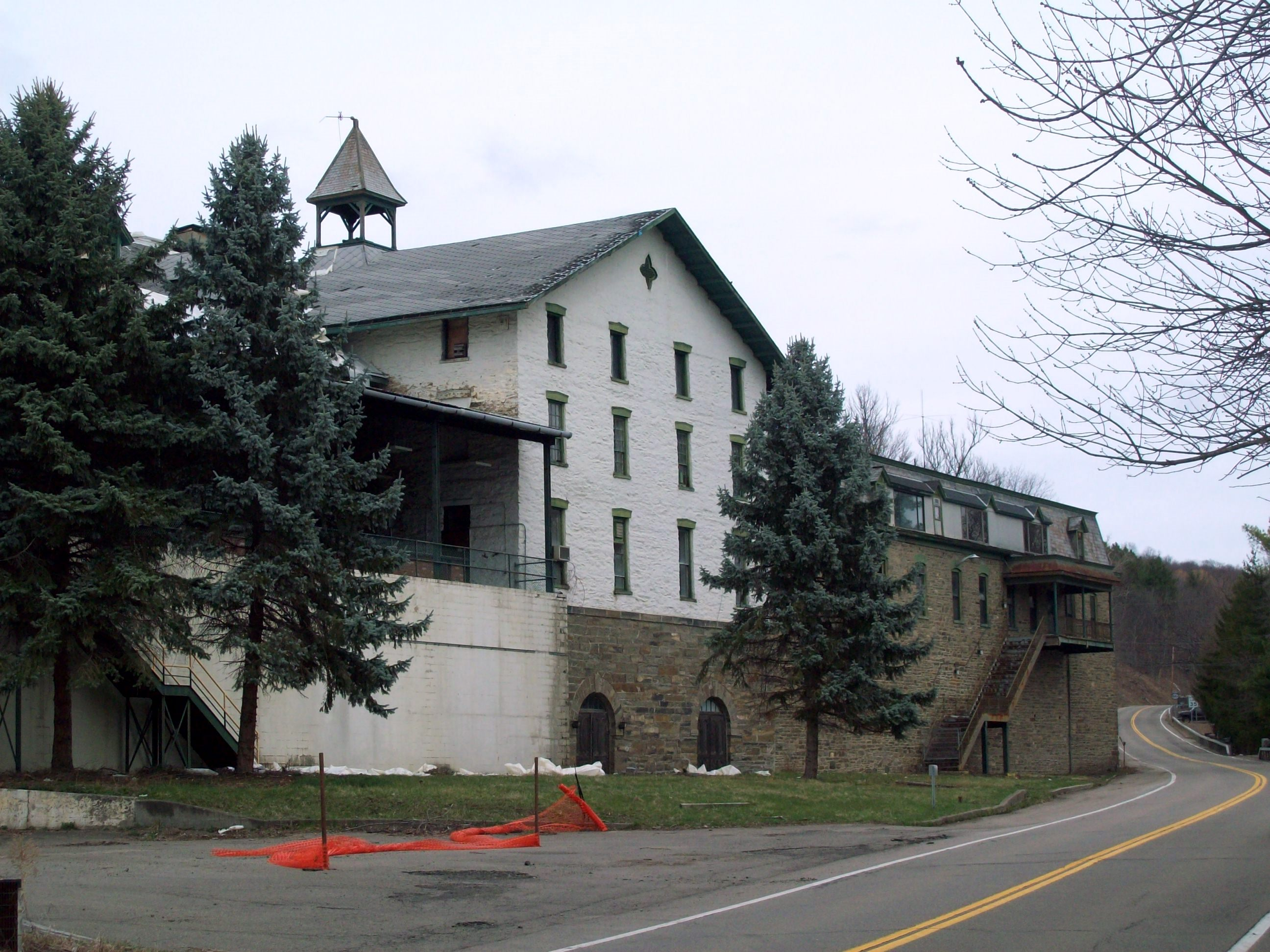
- Gold Seal Winery, April 2011

- Location within New York Location within the United States
- Location: West Lake Road, near Hammondsport, New York
- Coordinates: 42°27′24″N 77°10′50″W
- Area: 23.5 acres (9.5 ha)
- Built: 1865-1913
- Architectural style: Italianate, Second Empire
- NRHP reference No.: 10000946
- Added to NRHP: November 28, 2010

Gold Seal Winery is a historic winery complex located near Hammondsport in Steuben County, New York, United States. The primary building on the complex is in the Italianate style and constructed in 1865. It is a three-story, 54 feet by 110 feet, stone structure built into a hillside. It features a bell tower, gable roof with dormers, stuccoed upper stories, and barrel vaults. The original building was enlarged on at least six occasions. A long, narrow stone addition (20 feet by 120 feet) was built in 1890 and expanded in 1903–1903 with a mansard roof in the Second Empire style. Another major addition was built in 1884 and expanded in 1887. It included a champagne fluting room, an additional storage vault, and tasting porch. A 54 feet by 109 feet addition of reinforced concrete was built in 1912. Other contributing buildings are the Pornace House (1909) and brandy distillery (1865).

== History ==
The Urbana Wine Company is four miles north of the village of Hammondsport, in the town of Urbana. The winery was established in 1865, and known as the Urbana Wine Company until 1881 when it was reorganized under the name of "New Urbana Wine Company". The company was renamed the "Urbana Wine Company" in 1896, and the company reorganized after the Volstead Act was ratified as the 18th Amendment outlawing the manufacture, transportation and sale of alcohol. The company then was renamed the Gold Seal Products Company until the repeal of Prohibition, when the company changed its name back to "Urbana Wine Company, Inc."

During Prohibition the company produced sacramental wine. The company applied for the Gold Seal trademark in 1887. After the Repeal, Edwin Stewart Underhill Jr., President of the company went to Rheims, France and brought Charles Fournier, from Veuve Clicquot Ponsardin, where he served as Production Manager. He became the winemaker and production manager of Urbana Wine Company, and although intending to stay just a few years, remained employed there the rest of his life. He introduced several important French-American Hybrid grape varieties into the production of wine. He was made president of the company in 1951. The company was known for introducing the European Vitis vinifera grape to the United States and for its production of Finger Lakes champagne.

In the 1950s, Fournier brought in Dr. Konstantin Frank to help advance the effort to grow traditional European grapes in the Finger Lakes, and they brought Native American rootstock from Quebec to plant and graft with the European grapes in the Finger Lakes. These innovations proved visionary. They allowed grapes to grow in a cool climate, and to be resistant to the common phylloxera louse, which decimated vineyards worldwide. Dr. Frank, as a consultant, established a vitis vinifera nursery and remained with the company until establishing his own winery in 1962.

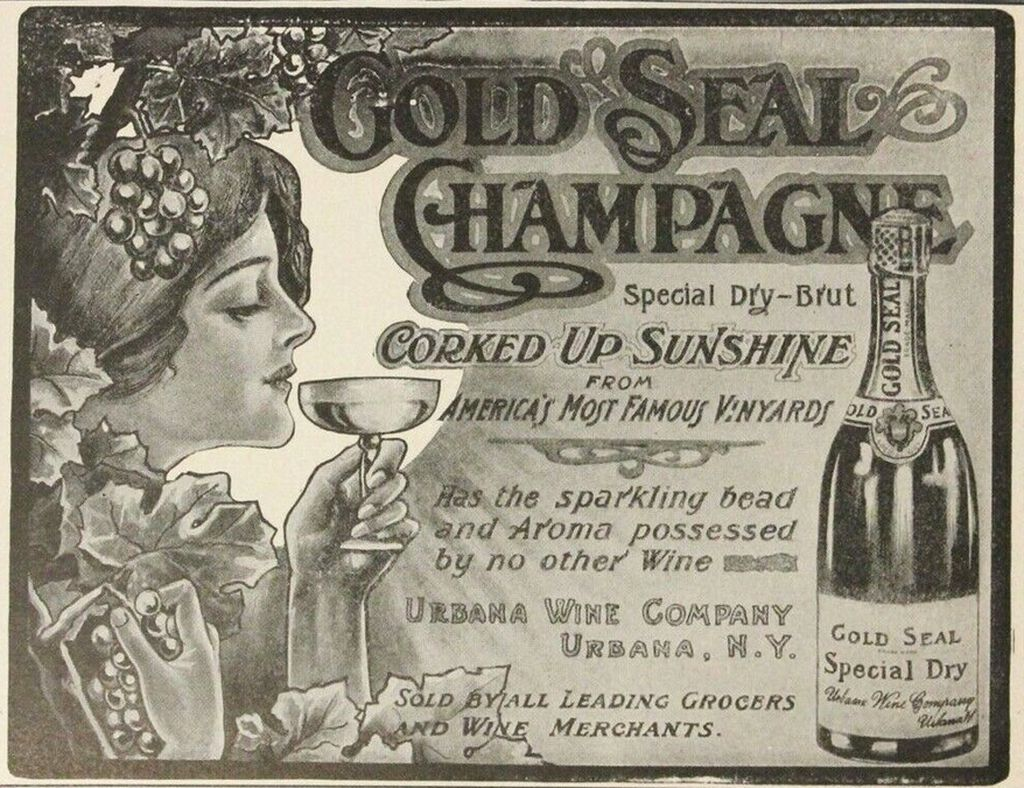
Advertising card of the Urbana Wine Company, 1909

The Urbana Wine Company was renamed the "Gold Seal Vineyards, Inc." in 1957 and it later was sold to Joseph E. Seagram & Sons in 1979, then to Vintners International in 1987 and in the 1990s to Canandaigua Wine Company which was later renamed Constellation Brands. The winery closed in May 1984 however some brands are still made with the Gold Seal name which is trademarked by Pleasant Valley Wine Company. The buildings and some acreage were sold to Linda & John Giglio in the first decade of the 21st century, and their effort to "restore" the properties began. Many wooden casks were sold and all the large stainless steel tanks used in wine production were removed.

It was listed on the National Register of Historic Places in late November 2010.
