= Wine Spectator =

American wine magazine

- Editor and publisher: Marvin R. Shanken
- Categories: Wine magazine
- First issue: April 1, 1976
- Company: M. Shanken Communications
- Country: United States
- Based in: New York City
- Language: English
- Website: www.winespectator.com
- ISSN: 0193-497X

Wine Spectator is an American lifestyle magazine that focuses on wine, wine culture and wine ratings. It is the flagship publication of M. Shanken Communications, which also publishes Cigar Aficionado, Whisky Advocate, Market Watch, Shanken News Daily and Shanken’s Impact Newsletter.

Wine Spectator editors review more than 15,000 wines each year in blind tastings. Wines are reviewed on a 100-point scale. Every issue contains 400 to 1,000 wine reviews with detailed tasting notes and drink recommendations

Each year since 1988, the publication has released its Top 100 list, where editors select the most exciting wines from the thousands reviewed during the course of the year. The Top 100 includes the coveted Wine of the Year honor.

Jeffery Lindenmuth is executive editor. As of 2023, senior editors include Bruce Sanderson, James Molesworth, Alison Napjus, MaryAnn Worobiec, Tim Fish, Kristen Bieler and Aaron Romano.

Past wine tasters include former managing editor Jim Gordon, Per-Henrik Mansson, former senior editor and European bureau chief James Suckling, who served at the magazine from 1981 to 2010, and former senior editor Nathan Wesley, who worked in the magazine's tasting department from 2005 to 2013.

Thomas Matthews served as executive editor from 1999 until his retirement in January 2021.

Longtime senior editor Kim Marcus, who helped shape the magazine's global coverage of wine for more than three decades, died in January 2022.

== Background and history ==
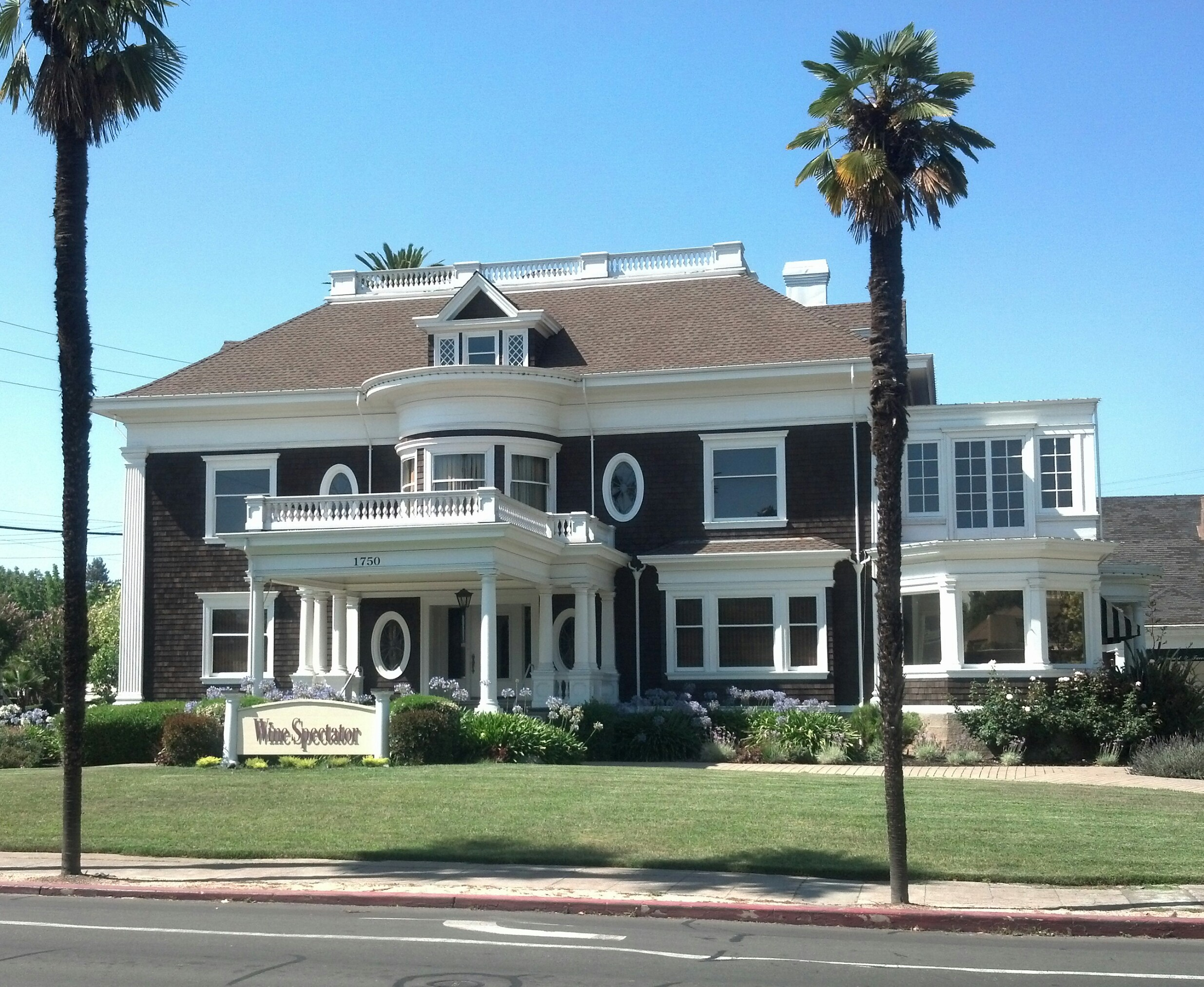
The offices of Wine Spectator in Napa, California

Founded as a San Diego–based tabloid newspaper by Bob Morrisey in 1976, The Wine Spectator was purchased in 1979 by Marvin R. Shanken, who transformed the bi-weekly newsletter focused on California into a glossy consumer magazine that covers the whole world of wine.

In 1981, the magazine introduced its Restaurant Awards program, which reviews restaurant wine lists on three levels: the Award of Excellence (basic), Best of Award of Excellence (second-tier), and the Grand Award (highest).

In 1986, the magazine organized and sponsored the Wine Spectator Wine Tasting of 1986 on the tenth anniversary of the Judgment of Paris.

== Events ==
Wine Spectator hosts the New York Wine Experience, an annual event that includes wine tastings, seminars, lunches and an awards banquet. In 2023, more than 4,000 attendees attended in New York City, where they sampled some of the world’s best wines: a total of 339 wines poured from 16,872 bottles into 48,582 glasses. Each year at the event, culinary stars participate in a Chef's Challenge, where their wine pairing skills are put to the test. José Andrés, Eric Ripert, Emeril Lagasse and Danny Meyer are all regular participants.

The magazine's Grand Tour takes the tastings on the road to three cities each spring, with more than 200 wines, all rated 90 points or higher by Wine Spectator editors, poured at the events.

In 2023, Wine Spectator announced a partnership with Palm Beach Food & Wine Festival, with the joint venture elevating the festival's lineup of fine wine and spirits, and all wines poured throughout the festival being rated 90 or higher by Wine Spectator

== Philanthropy ==
The magazine also runs the Wine Spectator Scholarship Foundation. Since its founding in 1982, the Foundation has raised more than $30 million to support wine and food education and scholarship programs.

In 2021, the Foundation donated $10 million to Napa Valley College, supporting the college's Viticulture, Wine and Technology program teaching spaces. Construction of the Wine Spectator Wine Education Center, a 7,000-square-foot classroom building featuring flexible sensory classrooms and lab stations, is set to commence in spring 2024.

In 2017, it pledged $1 million to the Washington State University Viticulture & Enology Program.

In 2014, it granted $3 million to Sonoma State University, toward a new building for its Wine Business Institute.

== Criticism ==
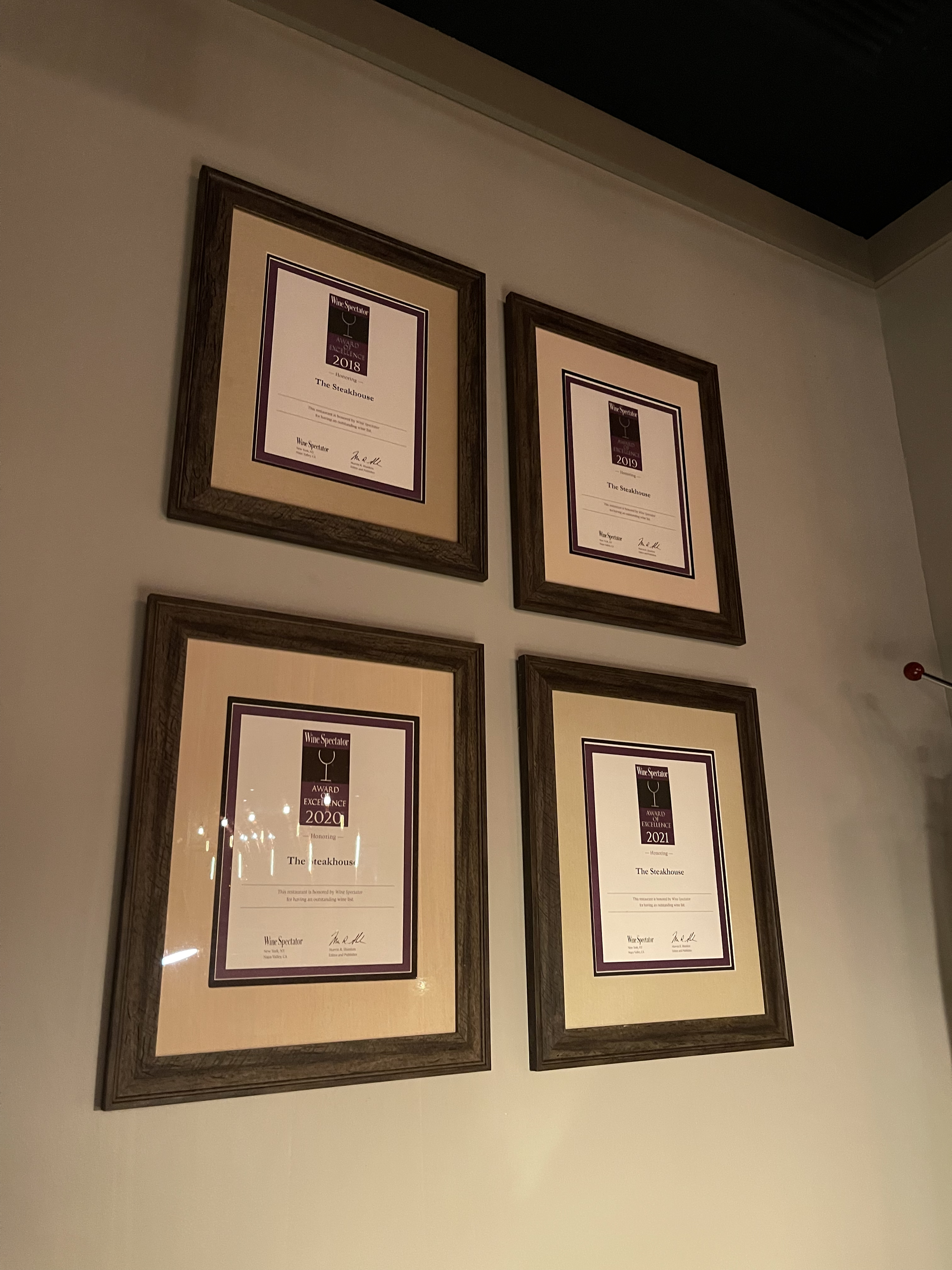
Wine Spectactor's restaurant awards on display at the Boomtown Steakhouse in Verdi, Nevada.

The magazine's Restaurant Awards program has come under some criticism. At the August 2008 conference of the American Association of Wine Economists in Portland, Oregon, a hoax exposé submission of the fictitious restaurant Osteria L'Intrepido was revealed by the author and Fearless Critic founder Robin Goldstein: he had won an Award of Excellence for a restaurant that didn't exist and whose "reserve wine list" was full of the lowest-rated Italian wines in history. He stated the exposé to be part of research for an academic paper, whose aim was to discover what it takes for a restaurant's wine list to receive an award from the magazine. With nearly 4,500 restaurant applications, the magazine takes in over $1 million each year from submission fees. Editor Thomas Matthews published an official response on the magazine's forum site.

== See also ==
- List of food and drink magazines
