= Bully Hill Vineyards =

Winery in Hammondsport, New York

Coordinates: 42°26′28.30″N 77°12′29.30″W

- Industry: Winery
- Founded: 1958
- Headquarters: Urbana, New York
- Products: Wine and merchandise
- Website: Official website

Bully Hill Vineyards is a vineyard and winery located in the Town of Urbana approximately two miles north of the Village of Hammondsport, New York, United States, in the Finger Lakes American Viticultural Area.

== History ==
=== Background and Prohibition ===
In 1920, the Taylor Wine Company needed room to expand as well as consistent sources of electricity and water. The winery was moved to a location two miles outside of Hammondsport and the original property, where Bully Hill sits today, was sold to a Lloyd Sprague. During Prohibition, the winery sold grape juice in small wooden barrels. A label was placed on the barrel giving explicit instructions on how the juice would turn into wine if precautions weren't taken.

=== Becoming Bully Hill ===
Love My Goat Red Wine

In 1958, Greyton H. Taylor and Walter S. Taylor bought back the property from Sprague and established Bully Hill Farms. Greyton and Walter began converting the native American grapes on the land to French-American hybrid grapes, pioneering those varieties in New York State. Over the next 12 years, Walter and Greyton slowly built a winery on location. Walter represented the third generation of his family to be involved in grape growing and wine making, a family endeavor since 1878. Bully Hill was one of the first small estate wineries in the Keuka Lake area since Prohibition.

In May 1970, Walter Taylor was fired from the Taylor Wine Company. He and Greyton Taylor founded Bully Hill that same year. When Greyton passed in 1971, Taylor inherited his shares of ownership in Bully Hill. Walter founded, the Finger Lakes Wine Museum, the first wine museum in America and began to criticize other New York State wine makers for using out-of-state grapes in their products. This enraged other wine makers and rumors began to circulate that Taylor had 'gone off the deep end'. Walter then went on a tour to defend his product and against the rumors that he had gone insane. He called it the tour of "Johnny Grapeseed".

In July 1977, after a merger with Coca-Cola Co., the Taylor Wine Co. sued Taylor to stop him from using his last name. U.S. District Court Judge Harold P. Burke agreed with the complaint. His instructions were that Bully Hill was enjoined from "using the word Taylor or any colorable imitation thereof in connection with any labeling, packaging materials, advertising, or promotional material for any of defendant's products." The Taylor name was then blotted out wherever it appeared on Bully Hill products. During the court battle, sales at Bully Hill Vineyards climbed from $650,000 in 1977 to more than $2 million in 1980. Visitors at Bully Hill Vineyards increased 25% after Taylor went on a media campaign to spread the word of the case. Taylor's appeal argued that the injunction was "too broad." The court said Taylor could use his signature "on a Bully Hill label or advertisement if he chooses, but only with the appropriate disclaimer that he is not connected with, or a successor to, the Taylor Wine Co." However, because of the attention, Taylor had received, Taylor Wine Company's lawyers argued that Taylor was violating the spirit of the injunction itself. Judge Burke, on October 5, 1979, made the injunction permanent. "Judge Burke then ordered Bully Hill to adhere to a list of 11 stipulations detailing what Taylor could say, and how and when he could use his name. For example, the judge said that the lettering and size of Walter's signature could be "no larger than one-fourth the size of the lettering of the Bully Hill Vineyards Inc. trademark on the same label, advertisement, side, surface, or page." He also ordered that within 30 days of his decision, Bully Hill had to deliver to Taylor Wine all prohibited labeling and advertising "for destruction." November 8, 1979, Taylor drove four miles from Bully Hill to Taylor Wine Company to return the labels and other marketing products amid several spectators who were cheering him on. He threw a parade, despite not having a permit, and then threw a party at Bully Hill.

Taylor was upset: "I remembered when all those farmers demonstrated in Washington, they let loose a bunch of goats, and all the guards were running around after them. So I got a goat and it saved my life. That's when I decided to laugh at the whole thing, to laugh at life." He then famously stated that "They took my name and heritage, but they didn't get my goat." Until his death Taylor would often say things like, "Just call me Walter S. Blank," or "Yes, I'm the owner of Bully Hill, but I can't tell you where I came from." Many of his own drawings are still used as labels.

In 1982, the vineyard filed the trademark 'Space Shuttle Rose'. This was contested by NASA whose action was denied by the Trademark Trials and Appeals Board in 1987.

== Facilities and distribution ==
View of Keuka Lake from Bully Hill Vineyards

Growing from a small winery with a limited number of employees, Bully Hill Vineyards offers over 40 different selections of wine and now produces over 200,000 cases of wine each year. They are the second-largest producer of wine in New York State. Bully Hill features an on-site restaurant, wine shop, two gift shops, and the New York State Wine Museum of Greyton H. Taylor and Walter S. Taylor Art Gallery. Visitors are offered tours and wine tastings throughout the year, weather permitting. Bully Hill wine is distributed in some 30 states.

== Sponsorships ==
As of 2022, Bully Hill sponsors five professional and nine minor league sports teams.

Bully Hill is the official wine of:

- The Buffalo Bills
- The Buffalo Sabres
- The Nashville Predators
- The Carolina Hurricanes
- The Boston Red Sox

Bully Hill also has an extensive history in NASCAR, mainly involving sponsorship of cars and the actual race sponsors themselves at Watkins Glen International, which is close to Bully Hill. Most of its history in the national touring series is with NEMCO Motorsports and driver Ron Fellows, though it has been very active in what is now the ARCA Menards Series East sponsoring at different times, Eric Bodine, Bryan Wall, and Dale Quarterley. They have been featured on other racing machines since 1997.
