= Whisky Advocate =

American whisky magazine

- Editor and publisher: Marvin R. Shanken
- Company: M. Shanken Communications
- Country: United States
- Language: English
- Website: www.whiskyadvocate.com
- ISSN: 2637-806X

Whisky Advocate is a quarterly print magazine that focuses on whisky. It is a publication of M. Shanken Communications.

== History and background ==
In 2010, Malt Advocate was acquired by M. Shanken Communications, which then renamed the publication to Whisky Advocate. From the deal, WhiskyFest events were also brought under the M. Shanken umbrella.

Since April 2017, Marvin R. Shanken has served as editor and publisher.

In 2017 the magazine website was relaunched, including a "Whisky 101" guide to whisky, reviews on hundreds of different whisky brands and 3,500 searchable ratings.

As of 2023, David Fleming is executive editor.

== Events ==
Whisky Advocate hosts WhiskyFest, a whisky festival held in multiple cities annually. The events are held in cities including New York, Chicago and San Francisco.

== Ratings ==
The publication annually releases its Top 20 Whiskies list, where reviewers select the best whiskies of the year. The Top 20 includes the Whisky of the Year award, which went to Jack Daniel’s Bonded in 2022.
