= Pleasant Valley Wine Company =

- U.S. National Register of Historic Places
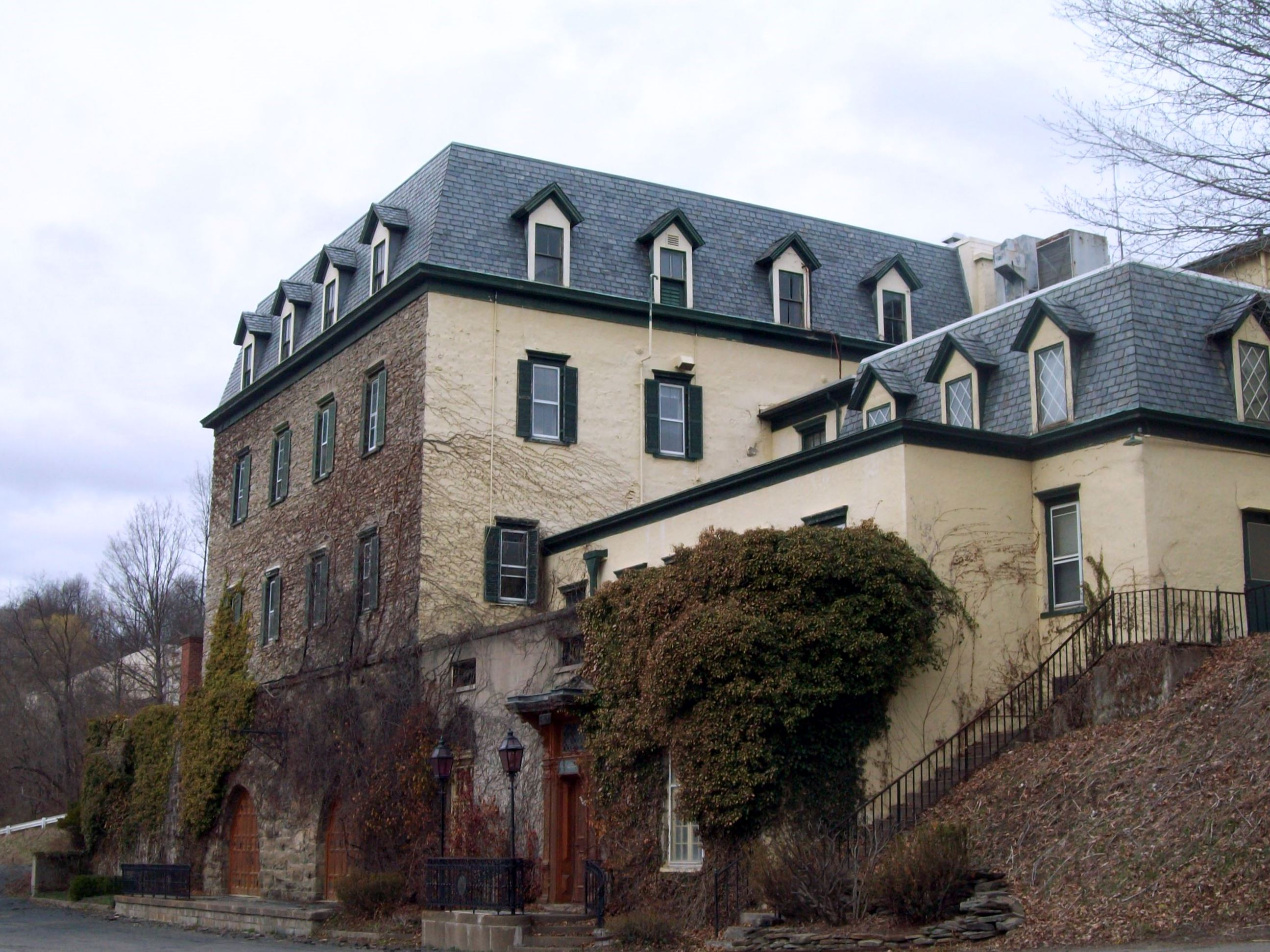
- Pleasant Valley Wine Company, April 2011

- Location within New York Location within the United States
- Location: SR 88, Rheims, New York
- Coordinates: 42°24′4″N 77°15′15″W
- Area: 5.2 acres (2.1 ha)
- Built: 1860
- Architectural style: Italianate
- NRHP reference No.: 80002773
- Added to NRHP: November 18, 1980

Pleasant Valley Wine Company, also known as Great Western Winery, is a historic winery complex located in the Hamlet of Rheims in the Town of Urbana in Steuben County, New York. The complex consists of nine historic buildings constructed of fieldstone. The five oldest structures were built in the 1860s and are in the Italianate style. It was listed on the National Register of Historic Places in 1980.

The winery has the largest plantings of Chardonnay and Riesling in New York.

== History ==
Established on March 15, 1860, by Charles Champlin and 12 other investors, the winery is the first bonded winery in the United States; bonded winery #1. The winery produced Isabella and Catawba initially, expanding into sparkling wine production in 1865, earning the Pleasant Valley the nickname "the Reims of America." The on-site post office used the postmark "Reims, NY" until 1945.

During Prohibition, the winery survived by making sacramental and medicinal wines. After Repeal, the winery was sold several times, including the Taylor Wine Company in 1961, and inclusion in the sale of Taylor to Coca-Cola in 1977. Coke sold the winery to Joseph E. Seagram & Sons in 1983, which sold the winery to Vintners International in 1987. In 1995, the winery was purchased by the Doyle family.

== Gallery ==
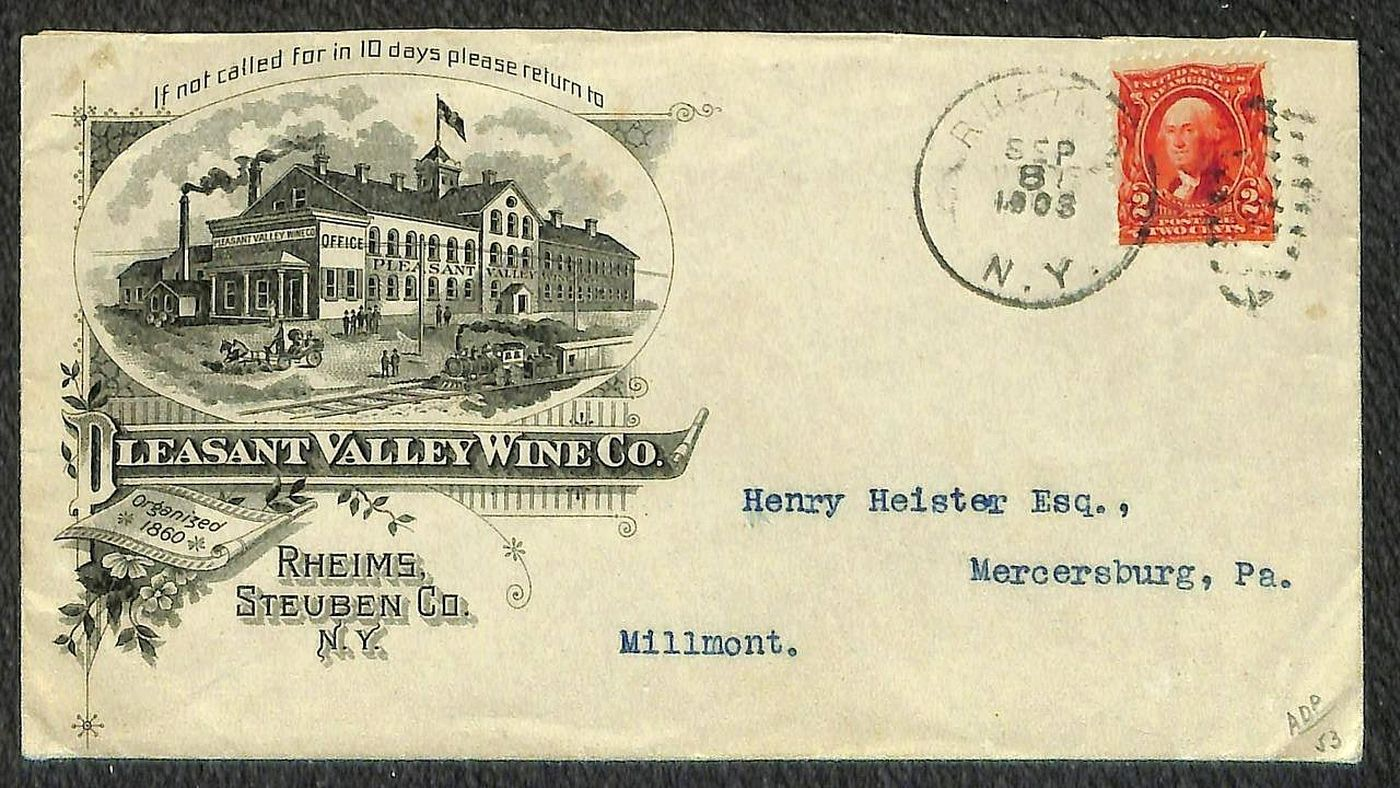
Pleasant Valley Wine Company — company stationery, 1903

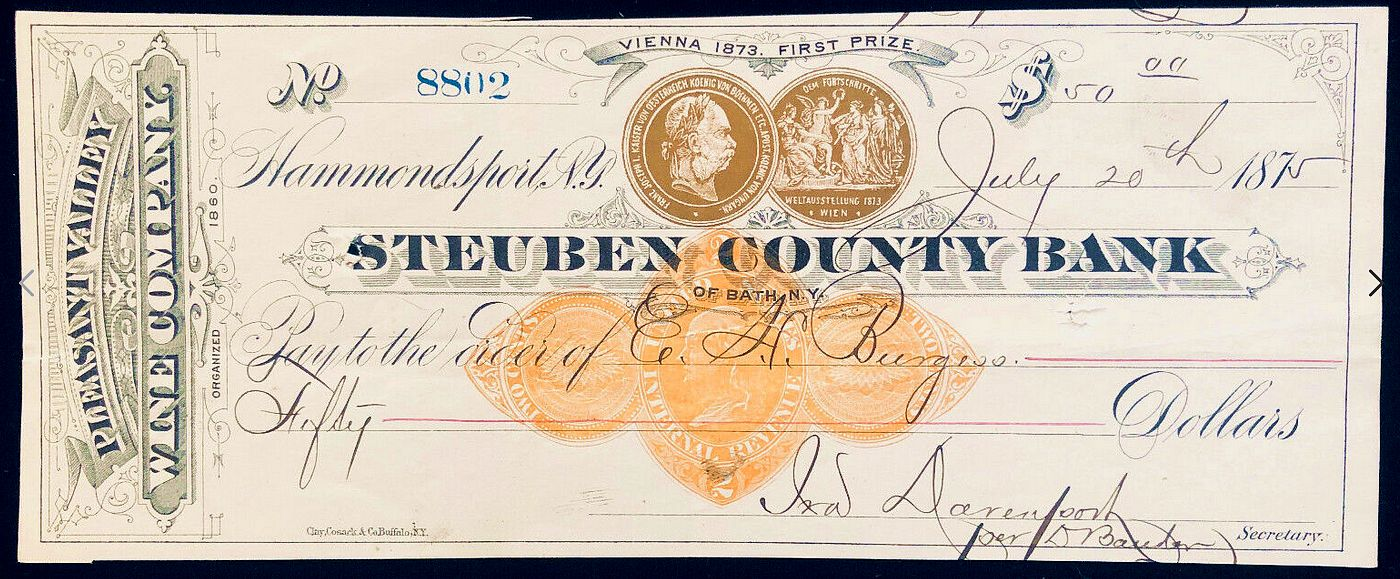
Check from the Pleasant Valley Wine Company, June 20, 1875

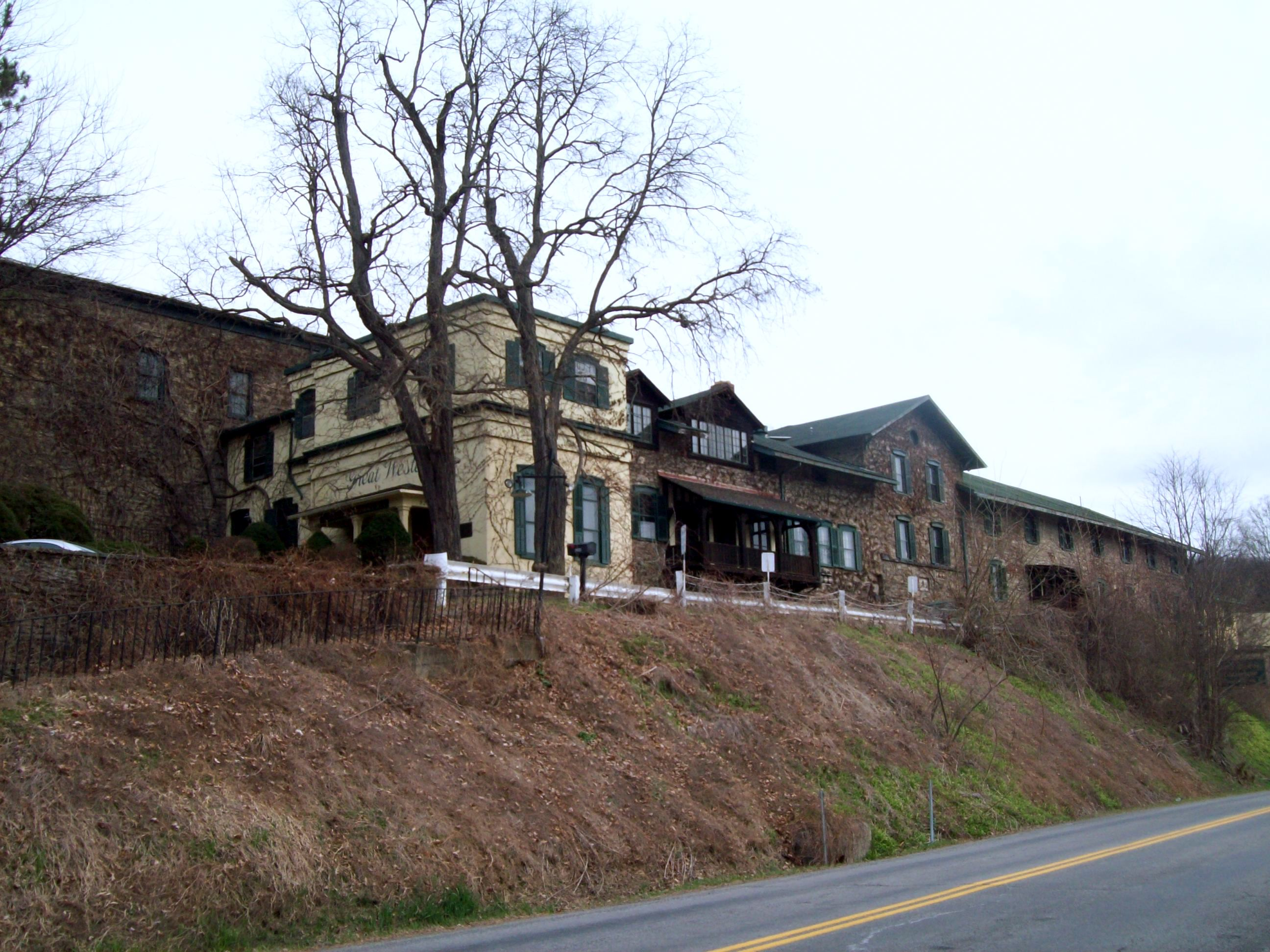
Pleasant Valley Wine Company, April 2011

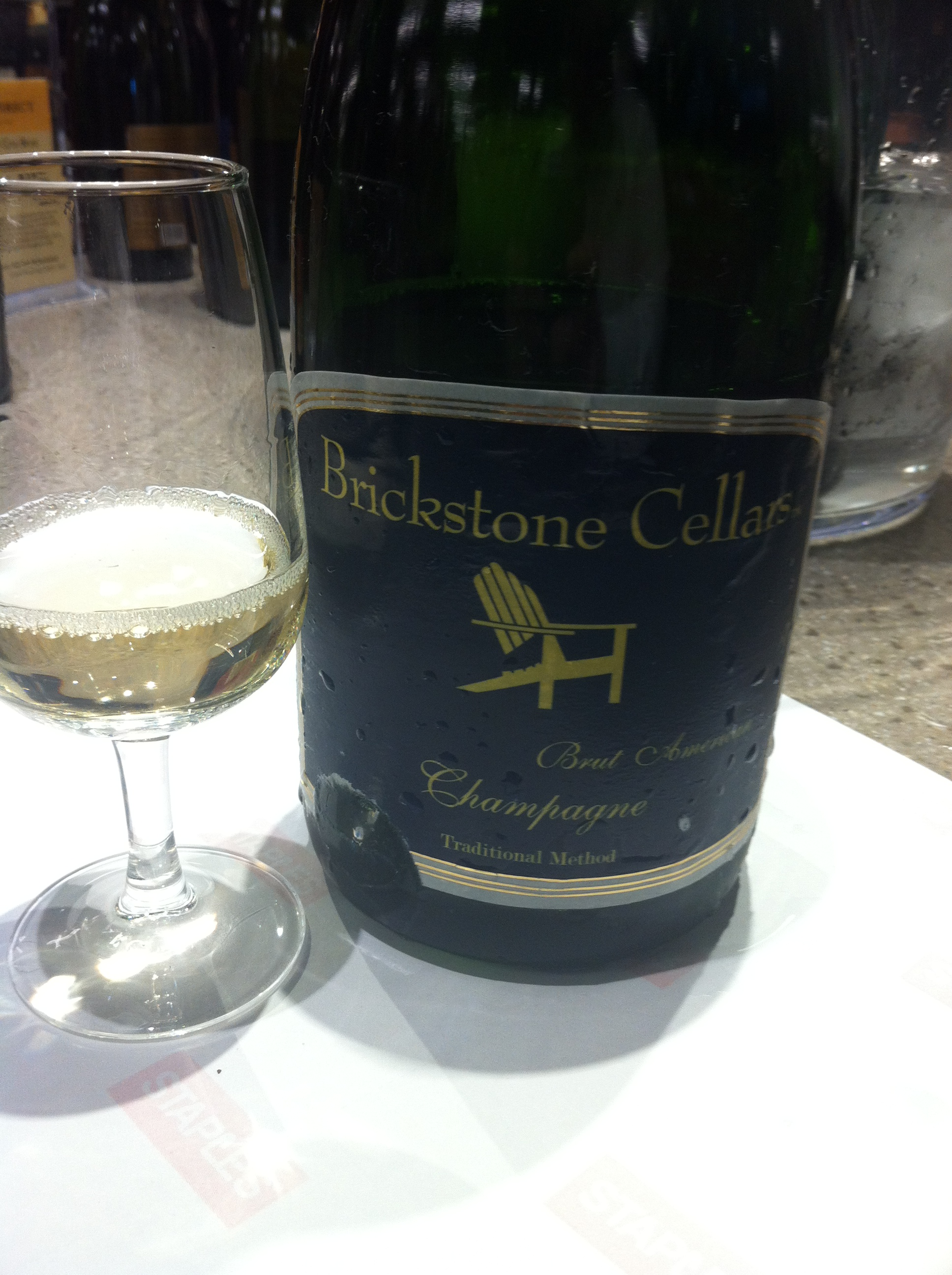
Brickstone Cellars, a second label of Pleasant Valley

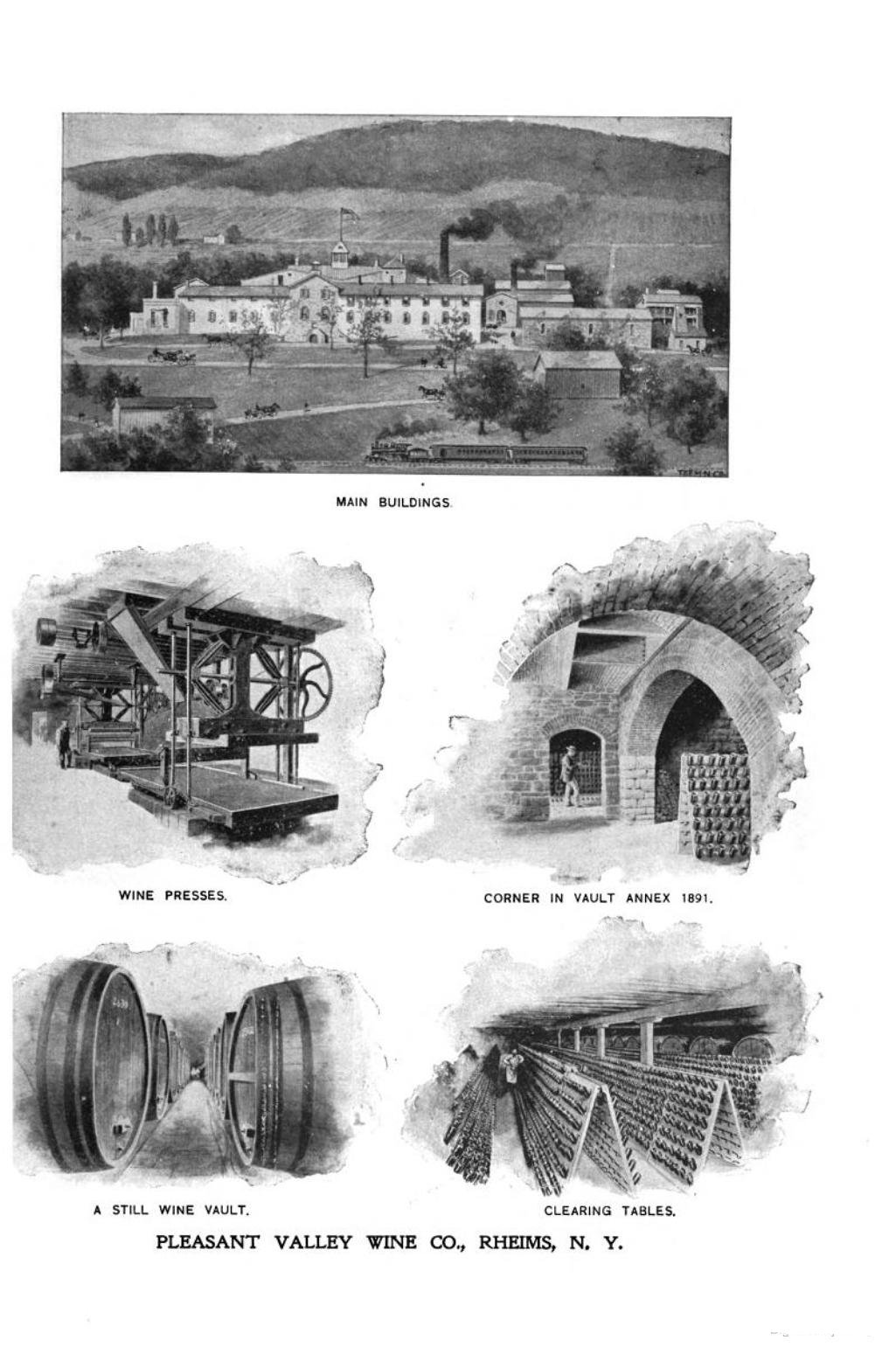
Views inside the winery, 1899.

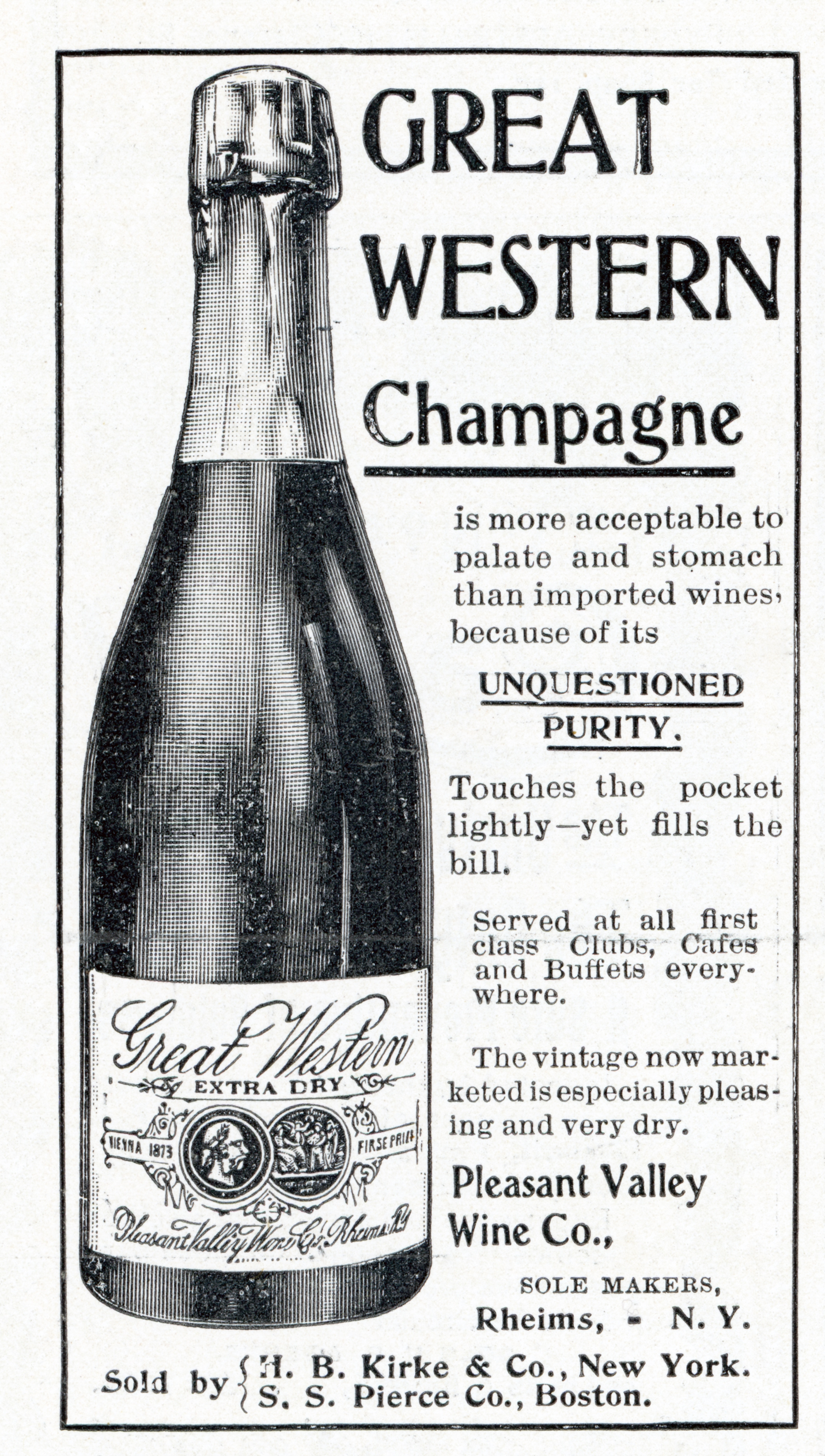
Great Western Champagne advertisement (1898)
