= Luke Tasker =

Canadian football player (born 1991)

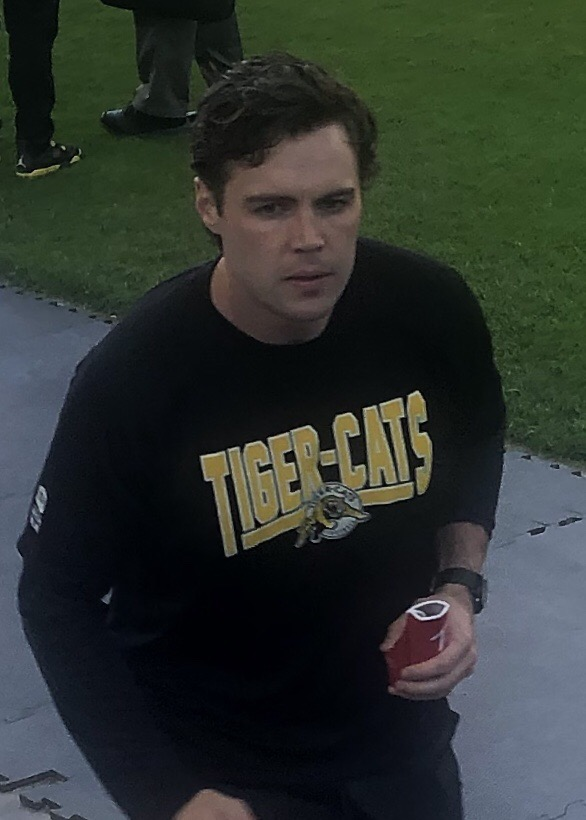
- Tasker with the Hamilton Tiger-Cats in 2019

No. 17
- Position: Wide receiver

Personal information
- Born: January 18, 1991 (age 35); East Aurora, New York, U.S.
- Listed height: 5 ft 11 in (1.80 m)
- Listed weight: 191 lb (87 kg)

Career information
- High school: St. Francis (Athol Springs, New York)
- College: Cornell
- NFL draft: 2013: undrafted

Career history
- 2013: San Diego Chargers*
- 2013–2019: Hamilton Tiger-Cats
- * Offseason or practice squad member only

Awards and highlights
- CFL All-Star (2018); 4× CFL East All-Star (2014, 2015, 2017, 2018)
- Stats at CFL.ca

Lucas Steele Tasker (born January 18, 1991) is an American former professional football wide receiver who spent the entirety of his seven-season Canadian Football League (CFL) career with the Hamilton Tiger-Cats. Tasker played college football at Cornell, and is the son of 7-time Pro Bowler and former CBS Sports color analyst Steve Tasker.

== Early life ==
Tasker attended St. Francis High School in Athol Springs, New York. Tasker was named first-team all-state in his senior season as a defensive back. He was a team captain for his junior and senior seasons at high school. Tasker also was selected as academic player of the year and was a member of the Western New York all-academic team as a defensive back during his senior season in high school.

== College career ==
Tasker played college football at Cornell University, and was enrolled in the College of Agriculture and Life Sciences. He was an honorable mention all-Ivy pick during his junior season. On September 15, 2012, In the season-opening loss against Fordham in which he recorded 10 receptions along with 177 receiving yards and one receiving touchdown. In the next game against Yale in which he had a team leading 10 receptions and a team leading 138 receiving yards along with two receiving touchdowns. On October 16, 2012, he was named the Ivy League co-offensive player of the week along with Cornell Quarterback Chris Amrhein for his outstanding performance against Monmouth in which he had 11 receptions, a school-record 280 receiving yards along with one receiving touchdown. During his senior season, on October 27, 2012 in a regular-season game against Princeton in which he had 10 receptions for 201 receiving yards and two receiving touchdowns as Cornell beat the Princeton Tigers 37-35. On November 20, 2012, he was selected to the Ivy league team during his senior season. He finished college with 171 receptions, 2,482 receiving yards and 15 receiving touchdowns.

== Professional career ==
=== San Diego Chargers ===
On April 27, 2013, Tasker signed with the San Diego Chargers as an undrafted free agent. However, Tasker did not make the team and was cut on August 30.

=== Hamilton Tiger-Cats ===
Tasker signed to the practice roster with the Hamilton Tiger-Cats of the Canadian Football League (CFL) on September 17, 2013. Tasker was reunited with Kent Austin (the head coach of the Tiger-Cats), who had been his head coach at Cornell University. He was moved to the active roster and made his CFL debut on September 28, 2013 against the Calgary Stampeders. He caught his first career touchdown in a 33–19 win over the Toronto Argonauts on October 4, 2013. Tasker only appeared in 5 games for the Ti-Cats during his rookie season, finishing the year with 202 receiving yards on 13 catches with 1 touchdown. His second season in the CFL, the 2014 CFL season, was a breakout year for Luke Tasker. He led the team in receptions (72), receiving yards (937) and was tied for the lead in receiving touchdowns (5) along with Brandon Banks. Tasker was recognized for his successful season when he was named a CFL East All-Star for the 2014 season. Following the 2014 season Tasker passed up on an offer from the Green Bay Packers of the NFL and the agreed to a contract extension with the Ti-Cats. Tasker continued his exceptional play in the next three seasons, highlighted by his 2017 campaign in which he set career highs in receptions (104) yards (1,167) and touchdowns (7). One day before the start of free agency the Ti-Cats and Tasker agreed to a two-year contract extension on February 12, 2018. Tasker ended the 2018 as one of the few healthy Hamilton receivers; Brandon Banks, Terrence Toliver, Chris Williams, and Jalen Saunders all finished the year with season ending injuries. Tasker however amassed 1104 yards and a career high 11 touchdowns on 78 catches, and was named to the 2018 CFL All-Star Team. Tasker missed about half the season in 2019 with a broken finger and a hamstring injury, limiting him to only 406 receiving yards on 36 receptions. Tasker was not re-signed by the Ti-Cats following the 2019 season and became a free agent on February 11, 2020.

== Personal life ==
His father is Steve Tasker, who was a wide receiver and special teams player in the National Football League for 13 seasons mostly with the Buffalo Bills. Luke married Jenna Fishback on May 17, 2014. The couple met during kindergarten in their hometown of East Aurora, New York.

== Broadcast career ==
On March 11, 2014, Tasker joined the staff of WBBZ-TV as a sports reporter; as Buffalo and Hamilton were separated by less than 50 miles, he was able to continue his career with the Tiger-Cats while working for WBBZ. He served in that capacity before WBBZ discontinued sports coverage in 2015.

On August 3, 2021, Tasker was named the new color commentator for the Tiger-Cats' radio broadcasts on The Ticats Audio Network. Tasker held the position through 2024, after which he was replaced by Simoni Lawrence.
