= Kyle Smith (American football) =

American football player and executive (born 1984)

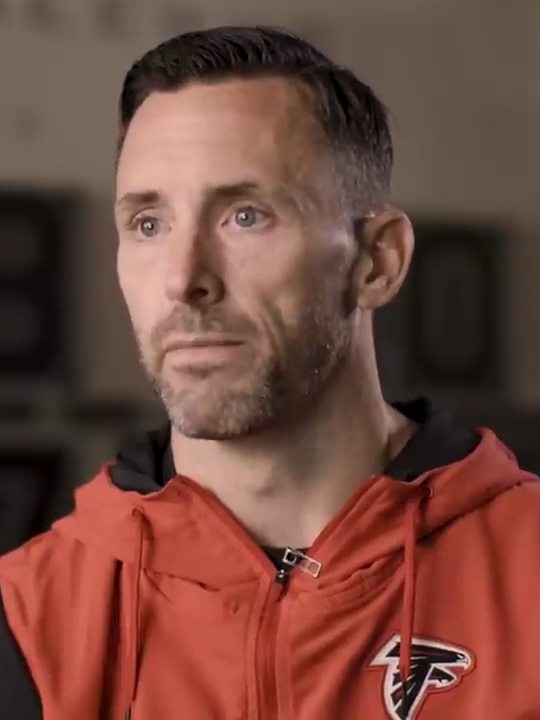
- Smith in 2022

Miami Dolphins
- Title: Assistant general manager

Personal information
- Born: October 15, 1984 (age 42); Warwick, Rhode Island, U.S.

Career information
- Position: Wide receiver (No. 80)
- High school: Saint Francis (Athol Springs, New York)
- College: Youngstown State (2002–2005)

Career history

Playing
- Minnesota Vikings (2006)*; Tampa Bay Buccaneers (2007)*; Berlin Thunder (2007); Georgia Force (2008); Arizona Rattlers (2008)*; Winnipeg Blue Bombers (2009)*
- * Offseason or practice squad member only

Operations
- Washington Redskins / Football Team (2010–2020); Scouting intern (2010); Scout (2011–2016); Director of college personnel (2017–2019); Vice president of player personnel (2020); Atlanta Falcons (2021–2025); Vice president of player personnel (2021–2022); Assistant general manager (2023–2025); Miami Dolphins (2026–present) Assistant general manager

Kyle Smith (born October 15, 1984) is an American football executive who is the assistant general manager for the Miami Dolphins of the National Football League (NFL). Prior to becoming an executive, he played wide receiver at Youngstown State University before spending some time in the NFL as well as the Arena Football League (AFL) and Canadian Football League (CFL).

After interning for a year, Smith became a full-time scout for the Washington Redskins in 2011. He worked in various executive roles for the Redskins during the late 2010s before joining the Falcons in 2021. He is the son of former San Diego Chargers general manager A. J. Smith.

== Early life ==
The son of former San Diego Chargers general manager A. J. Smith, Kyle Smith was born in Warwick, Rhode Island on October 15, 1984. He grew in the Buffalo metropolitan area while his father was an scout with the Buffalo Bills, later attending and playing wide receiver for Saint Francis High School. He was a team captain as a junior and senior, being named an All-Western New York selection during the latter. He finished his high school career as the team's leader in career receiving yards (1,904), career receptions (132) and single-season receptions (56). Smith also played basketball and ran track and field for the school, winning a title as a part of the 4 × 400 metres relay team.

Following high school, he received a full scholarship to attend Youngstown State where he played for the Youngstown State Penguins. He finished his career there with 101 career receptions, 1,536 receiving yards, 56 punt returns, and 377 return yards. As a junior in 2004, he was selected as the team's most outstanding offensive player, and was named the team's MVP as a senior the following year, as well as an All-Gateway Football Conference honorable mention. He also played in the 2006 Hula Bowl.

== Playing career ==
Smith was signed as an undrafted free agent by the Minnesota Vikings in 2006 but was released prior to training camp. He later joined the Tampa Bay Buccaneers in January 2007, where they reassigned him to the Berlin Thunder of NFL Europe. He then returned to the Buccaneers later that year but was released prior to the regular season. He later spent some time with the Georgia Force and Arizona Rattlers of the Arena Football League in 2008 and the Winnipeg Blue Bombers of the Canadian Football League in 2009.

== Executive career ==
In 2010, Smith joined the Washington Redskins as a scouting intern. He was hired full-time by the team in June 2011, being put in charge of the southeast region. Smith worked with his father A. J. during this period, who served as a consultant for the team from 2013 to 2015. Smith was promoted to director of college scouting in June 2017, where he had major influence in the team's NFL draft selections during the late 2010s. He was further promoted to vice president of player personnel in January 2020.

Smith left Washington in 2021 following a restructuring of their front office and joined the Atlanta Falcons under the same role later that year. He was promoted to assistant general manager in 2023.

Following the Falcons' choice to restructure their front office staff in the 2026 offseason, Smith was hired by the Miami Dolphins to serve as the team's assistant general manager under Jon-Eric Sullivan on January 23, 2026.
