= Lee Stempniak =

American ice hockey player (born 1983)

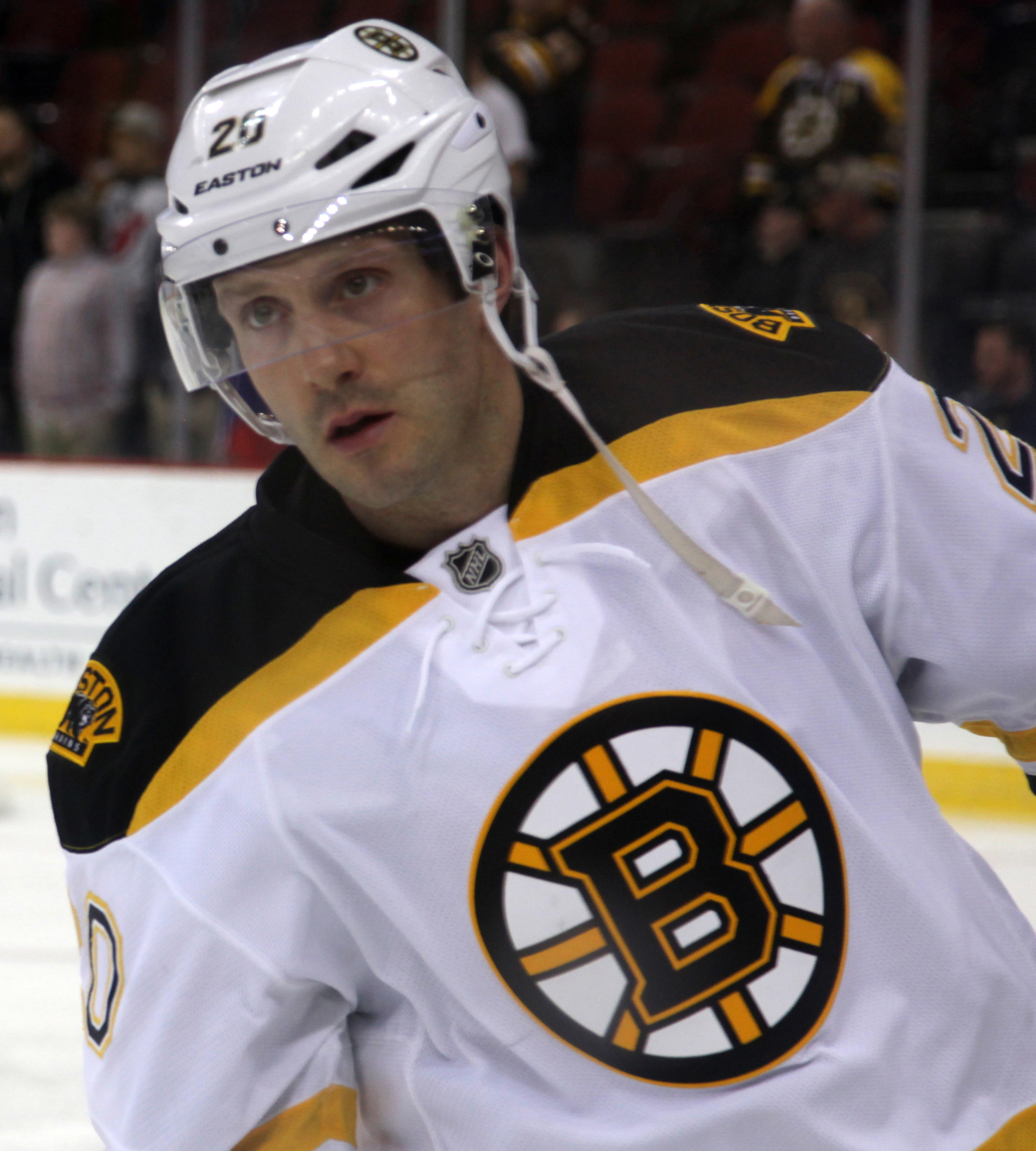
- Stempniak with the Boston Bruins in 2016
- Born: February 4, 1983 (age 43) West Seneca, New York, U.S.
- Height: 5 ft 11 in (180 cm)
- Weight: 190 lb (86 kg; 13 st 8 lb)
- Position: Right wing
- Shot: Right
- Played for: St. Louis Blues; Toronto Maple Leafs; Phoenix Coyotes; Calgary Flames; Pittsburgh Penguins; New York Rangers; Winnipeg Jets; New Jersey Devils; Boston Bruins; Carolina Hurricanes
- National team: United States
- NHL draft: 148th overall, 2003; St. Louis Blues
- Playing career: 2005–2019

Lee Edward Stempniak (born February 4, 1983) is an American former professional ice hockey forward who played in the National Hockey League (NHL). He played for the St. Louis Blues, Toronto Maple Leafs, Phoenix Coyotes, Calgary Flames, Pittsburgh Penguins, New York Rangers, Winnipeg Jets, New Jersey Devils, Boston Bruins and Carolina Hurricanes. He is now in charge of player development for the Utah Mammoth.

Stempniak graduated from St. Francis High School in Athol Springs, New York, in 2001, and played his college hockey at Dartmouth College in New Hampshire. A well-traveled and versatile forward, Stempniak has played for ten different teams in his NHL career, which is tied for the second-most in NHL history. On October 1, 2019, after 14 seasons in the NHL he announced his retirement.

== Early life ==
Stempniak lived near an ice hockey rink where he knew the owner. The owner would let him practice whenever he could. After high school, he wanted to continue to play hockey, but his parents wanted him to go to college. Stempniak went to the only college that showed interest in him, Dartmouth. At Dartmouth, he majored in economics. He became a top player for the Big Green ice hockey team and was named a two-time All American, as well as his team's captain.

== Playing career ==
=== St. Louis Blues ===
Stempniak was drafted by the St. Louis Blues in the fifth round, 148th overall, at the 2003 NHL entry draft. He led the team in goals in his first full season (2006–07), with 27, despite being just 23 years of age. He and David Backes joined Jay McClement to form one of the NHL's youngest lines.

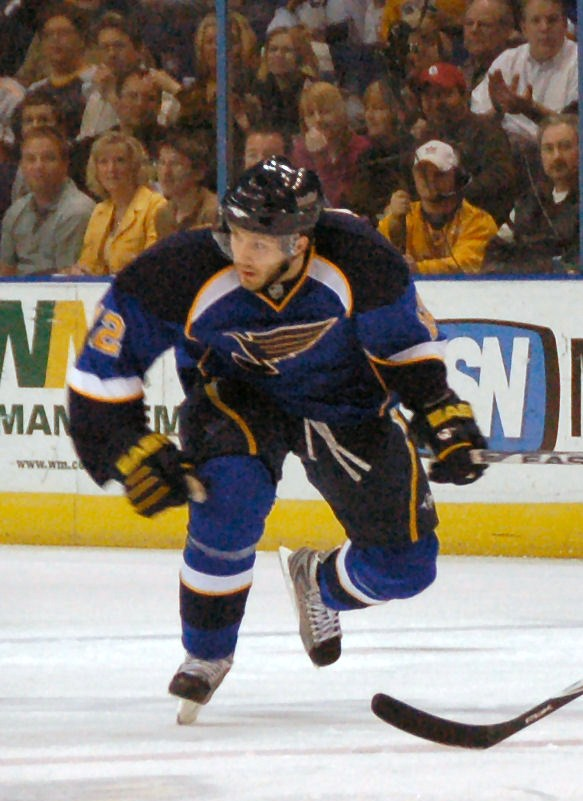
Stempniak as a member of the St. Louis Blues.

=== Toronto Maple Leafs ===
On November 24, 2008, Stempniak was traded to the Toronto Maple Leafs in exchange for Alexander Steen and Carlo Colaiacovo. Stempniak wore number 12 in Toronto.

=== Phoenix Coyotes ===
On March 3, 2010, Stempniak was traded to the Phoenix Coyotes for Matt Jones and a fourth- and seventh-round draft pick 2010. Twelve days later, Stempniak was named the NHL's Second Star of the Week, scoring five goals in three games, all in victories for the Coyotes. On April 1, 2010, Stempniak earned the NHL's Player of the Month honor for March after scoring 13 goals since the trade to Phoenix.

On August 30, 2010, Stempniak signed a two-year contract extension with the Coyotes.

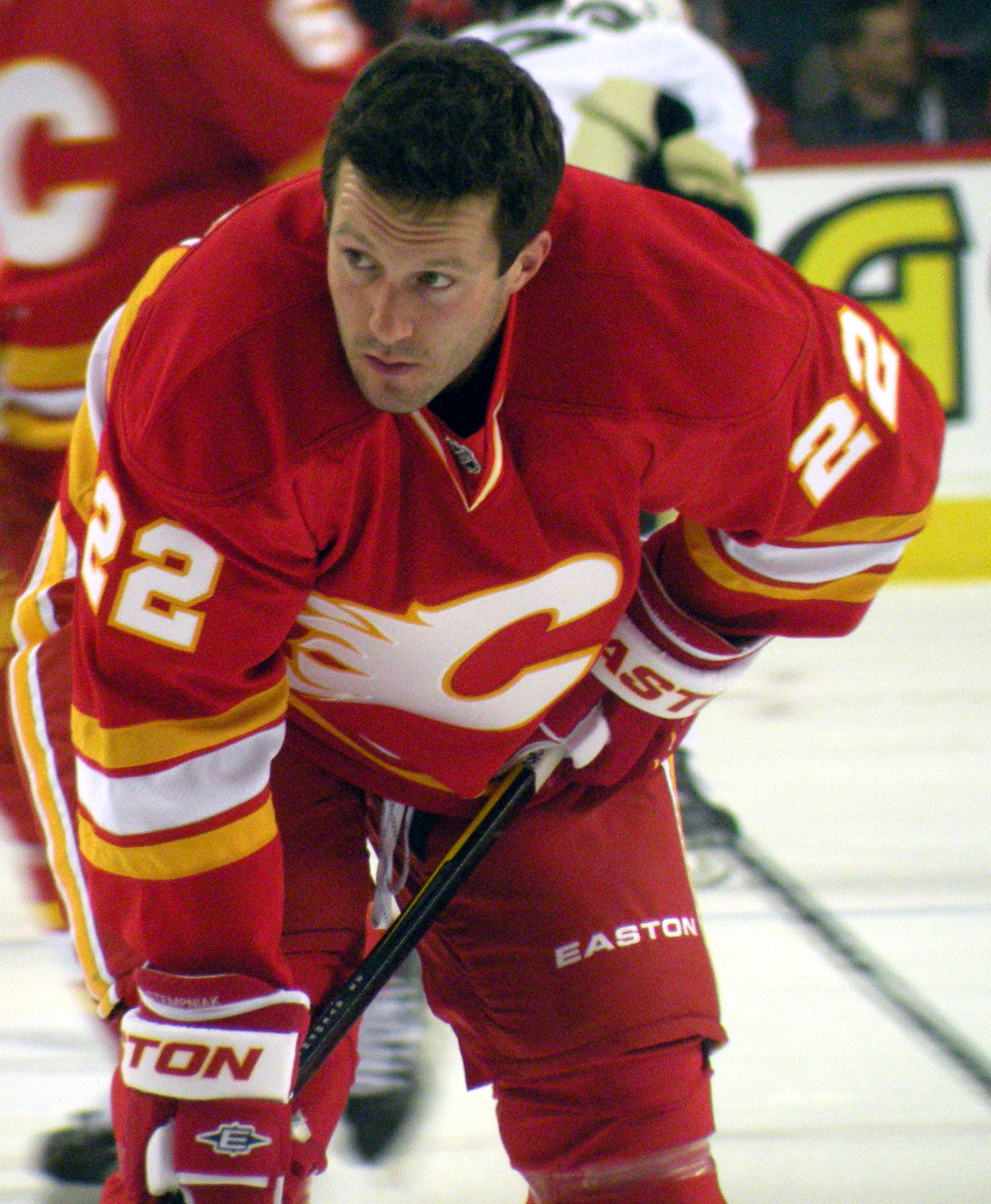
Lee Stempniak prior to making his debut with the Flames in 2011.

=== Calgary Flames ===
On August 29, 2011, the Coyotes traded Stempniak to the Calgary Flames for Daymond Langkow. He went on to record 14 goals with 14 assists during 61 games in 2011–12. On June 29, 2012, Stempniak re-signed with the Flames on a two-year, $5 million deal.

=== Pittsburgh Penguins ===
During the 2013–14 season, on March 5, 2014, Stempniak was dealt at the NHL trade deadline to the Pittsburgh Penguins for a third-round draft pick. In 21 games with the club, Stempniak recorded 11 points. He also had three points in 13 playoff games as the Penguins would lose in Round 2 against the New York Rangers.

=== New York Rangers ===
On July 19, 2014, Stempniak agreed to join his sixth NHL team, signing a one-year contract as a free agent with the New York Rangers. In the 2014–15 season, Stempniak was primarily used by the Rangers in a bottom six role, compiling nine goals and 18 points in 53 games.

=== Winnipeg Jets ===
On March 1, 2015, Stempniak was traded to the Winnipeg Jets in exchange for Carl Klingberg.

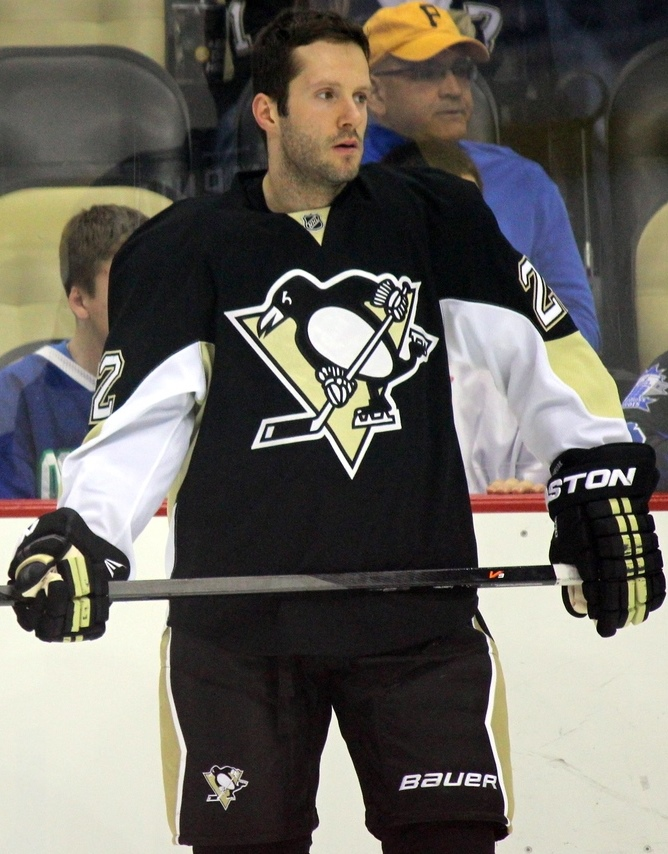
Stempniak with the Penguins in 2014

Stempniak scored the first playoff goal in Winnipeg since 1996 when he beat Anaheim's Frederik Andersen in the first period of Game 3 of the Western Conference Quarter Finals for a 1-0 Jets lead.

=== New Jersey Devils ===
On September 16, 2015, Stempniak agreed to join the New Jersey Devils on a professional tryout. He was signed by the Devils to a one-year contract worth $850,000 on October 3, 2015. In the 2015–16 season, Stempniak made a seamless transition to provide instant value to the Devils. In a scoring role, Stempniak was leading the Devils with 41 points in 63 games, having his best offensive season since 2010.

=== Boston Bruins ===
Stempniak was traded for a third consecutive season at the trade deadline to the Boston Bruins in exchange for a second-round and fourth-round pick on February 29, 2016. Stempniak finished out the season scoring 10 points in 19 games.

=== Carolina Hurricanes ===
Unable to help the Bruins into the post-season, Stempniak familiarly approached the off-season as a free agent. Following a successful individual year, on July 1, 2016, Stempniak was promptly signed to a two-year contract to join his tenth NHL club, the Carolina Hurricanes.

=== Return to Boston ===
Stempniak joined the Boston Bruins during the start of training camp, signing a Professional Tryout (PTO) contract on September 10, 2018. Stempniak began the 2018–19 without a contract, however continued to train with the Bruins at times throughout the first months of the season. While continuing informally with the team, Stempniak belatedly signed a professional try-out contract in the AHL to join affiliate, the Providence Bruins, on February 15, 2019. After 4 games with Providence, and ahead of the NHL trade deadline, Stempniak signed a one-year, one-way contract with Boston on February 24, 2019.

== Career statistics ==
=== Regular season and playoffs ===
			Regular season					Playoffs
Season	Team	League	GP	G	A	Pts	PIM	GP	G	A	Pts	PIM
1998–99	Saint Francis High School	HSNY	16	16	16	32	—	—	—	—	—	—
1999–2000	Saint Francis High School	HSNY	—	—	—	—	—	—	—	—	—	—
1999–2000	Rochester Jr. Americans AAA	Midget	—	—	—	—	—	—	—	—	—	—
2000–01	Buffalo Lightning	OPJHL	48	34	41	85	36	—	—	—	—	—
2001–02	Dartmouth College	ECAC	32	12	9	21	8	—	—	—	—	—
2002–03	Dartmouth College	ECAC	34	21	28	49	32	—	—	—	—	—
2003–04	Dartmouth College	ECAC	34	16	22	38	42	—	—	—	—	—
2004–05	Dartmouth College	ECAC	35	14	29	43	34	—	—	—	—	—
2005–06	Peoria Rivermen	AHL	20	8	5	13	25	3	0	3	3	2
2005–06	St. Louis Blues	NHL	57	14	13	27	22	—	—	—	—	—
2006–07	St. Louis Blues	NHL	82	27	25	52	33	—	—	—	—	—
2007–08	St. Louis Blues	NHL	80	13	25	38	40	—	—	—	—	—
2008–09	St. Louis Blues	NHL	14	3	10	13	2	—	—	—	—	—
2008–09	Toronto Maple Leafs	NHL	61	11	20	31	31	—	—	—	—	—
2009–10	Toronto Maple Leafs	NHL	62	14	16	30	18	—	—	—	—	—
2009–10	Phoenix Coyotes	NHL	18	14	4	18	8	7	0	2	2	0
2010–11	Phoenix Coyotes	NHL	82	19	19	38	19	4	0	0	0	0
2011–12	Calgary Flames	NHL	61	14	14	28	16	—	—	—	—	—
2012–13	Calgary Flames	NHL	47	9	23	32	12	—	—	—	—	—
2013–14	Calgary Flames	NHL	52	8	15	23	28	—	—	—	—	—
2013–14	Pittsburgh Penguins	NHL	21	4	7	11	4	13	2	1	3	6
2014–15	New York Rangers	NHL	53	9	9	18	18	—	—	—	—	—
2014–15	Winnipeg Jets	NHL	18	6	4	10	2	4	1	0	1	0
2015–16	New Jersey Devils	NHL	63	16	25	41	34	—	—	—	—	—
2015–16	Boston Bruins	NHL	19	3	7	10	4	—	—	—	—	—
2016–17	Carolina Hurricanes	NHL	82	16	24	40	32	—	—	—	—	—
2017–18	Charlotte Checkers	AHL	1	0	0	0	0	—	—	—	—	—
2017–18	Carolina Hurricanes	NHL	37	3	6	9	4	—	—	—	—	—
2018–19	Providence Bruins	AHL	20	7	11	18	8	4	0	1	1	10
2018–19	Boston Bruins	NHL	2	0	0	0	0	—	—	—	—	—
NHL totals			911	203	266	469	327	28	3	3	6	6

=== International ===
Year	Team	Event	GP	G	A	Pts	PIM
2007	United States	WC	7	6	4	10	27
2008	United States	WC	7	0	3	3	6
2009	United States	WC	9	2	0	2	6
Senior totals			23	8	7	15	39

== Awards and honors ==
Award	Year
College
All-ECAC Hockey Rookie Team	2001–02
All-ECAC Hockey First Team	2003–04, 2004–05
AHCA East First-Team All-American	2003–04
AHCA East Second-Team All-American	2004–05
