= Jim Kubiak =

American football player and coach (born 1972)

No. 12
- Position: Quarterback

Personal information
- Born: May 12, 1972 (age 54); Athol Springs, New York, U.S.
- Listed height: 6 ft 2 in (1.88 m)
- Listed weight: 211 lb (96 kg)

Career information
- High school: St. Francis (Athol Springs)
- College: Navy
- NFL draft: 1996: undrafted

Career history

Playing
- Carolina Panthers (1996–1997); Indianapolis Colts (1998–1999)*; Barcelona Dragons (1999); New York Jets (1999–2000)*; Amsterdam Admirals (1999–2000); Buffalo Destroyers (2001–2002); Indianapolis Colts (2003)*; Dallas Desperados (2003); Detroit Fury (2004); Georgia Force (2005)
- * Offseason or practice squad member only

Coaching
- Erie (2005) Quarterbacks coach; Philadelphia Soul (2005) Offensive coordinator; Georgia Force (2008–2012) Offensive coordinator; Mansfield (2017) Offensive coordinator; Hilbert (2022) Head coach

Operations
- Georgia Force (2006) Director of player personnel; Georgia Force (2007) Director of football operations

Awards and highlights
- Second Team All-Arena (2003)

Career AFL statistics
- Comp. / Att.: 788 / 1,242
- Passing yards: 9,985
- TD–INT: 189–36
- QB rating: 114.42
- Rushing TDs: 8
- Stats at ArenaFan.com

James Kubiak (born May 12, 1972) is an American former professional football player and coach. He is currently the director of the WNY Quarterback Academy, and he was most recently the head football coach at Hilbert College for their first season in 2022. Kubiak was the director of football operations and offensive coordinator for the Georgia Force of the Arena Football League (AFL). He played college football for the Navy Midshipmen.

During his career, Kubiak played for the Carolina Panthers, Indianapolis Colts, Barcelona Dragons, New York Jets, Buffalo Destroyers, Dallas Desperados, Detroit Fury, and Georgia Force.

== College career ==
After a successful prep career at St. Francis High School in Hamburg, New York, Kubiak attended the United States Naval Academy, where he was a four-year letterman and three-year starter.

In 1991, Kubiak started the season on the JV team and earned a spot on the Midshipmen's final roster. He earned the starting job in the fifth week of the season and finished the season 93-of-154 for 957 yards, two touchdowns and 11 interceptions, having led the Midshipmen to their sole victory of the season over archrival Army. In 1992, he passed for 35 yards, completing 6-of-15 passes before dislocating his shoulder in the season opener against Virginia. As a result, he underwent season-ending surgery. In 1993, as a junior, he returned to set school records for passing yards (2,628), attempts (401) and completions (248), while throwing 11 touchdowns and 17 interceptions.

In his career, Kubiak set 22 school records and left as the school's all-time leader in passing yards (6,008) and pass completions (558), while throwing 23 touchdowns.

== Professional career ==
=== National Football League (1996–2000, 2003) ===
Kubiak signed with the Carolina Panthers as an undrafted rookie in 1996. He was also on active military duty during the season. He was then out of football in 1997. In 1998, he signed with the Indianapolis Colts, where he went to training camp but missed the season to fulfill his naval commitment. He was then re-signed by the Colts in 1999, and was then allocated to the Barcelona Dragons of NFL Europe. In December 1999, he signed with the New York Jets, he was then allocated to the Amsterdam Admirals of NFL Europe. He finished the season 76-of-129 for 817 yards, 17 touchdowns and 10 interceptions. He was then released by the Jets following training camp.

In 2003, he attended training camp with the Colts, however, he was released after camp.

=== Arena Football League (2001–2005) ===
In 2001, Kubiak signed with the Buffalo Destroyers of the Arena Football League.

As a rookie in AFL. Kubiak finished the season 295-of-484 for 3,787 yards, 64 touchdowns and 15 interceptions. His attempts, completions and yardage totals all set new league rookie records. In his debut on the road against the Toronto Phantoms, he completed 29-of-38 passes for a season-high 365 yards and six touchdowns. In his home debut against the New Jersey Gladiators, he was 20-of-35 for 253 yards, four touchdowns and an interception. He also recorded his first rushing touchdown. In a game against the Carolina Cobras, he threw a season-high seven touchdown passes. In 2002, he served as the back-up to Quarterback Andy Kelly. Kubiak saw most of his playing time as a holder for field goal and extra point attempts. His only playing time with the offense occurred on the road against the Chicago Rush when Kelly went down with a strained hip flexor early in the second quarter. Kubiak finished the overtime loss 29-of-38 for 264 yards, five touchdowns and an interception.

In 2003, Kubiak joined the Dallas Desperados. He also put together one of the best seasons in league history. He finished the season 388-of-557 for 4,762 yards, 97 touchdowns and 17 interceptions, all career-highs, while leading the top ranked offense in the league. His 4,762 passing yards and 69.7% completion percentage each league records. He had nine-of-16 games with a completion percentage of 70.0% or higher. For that seasons performance, he earned Second-team All-Arena honors.

In 2004, Kubiak signed with the Detroit Fury on February 6. However, he was placed on Injured Reserve on February 9, after having surgery in January for a cervical disk herniation between the C-6 and C-7 vertebrae in the base of his neck. In 2005 he signed with the Georgia Force, on the first day of the AFL's free agency signing period, where he rejoined former teammates and coaches from Dallas, Offensive coordinator Steve Thonn, WR/LB Dialleo Burks and WR/DB Luke Leverson. However, Kubiak injured his knee during Week 5, and missed the rest of the season.

== Coaching career ==
In 2005, Kubiak was hired as the quarterbacks coach for Erie Community College. He was also hired as the Philadelphia Soul's offensive coordinator. In 2006, he was the Force's Director of Player Personnel, followed by becoming the team's Director of Football Operations in 2007. The following season, he became the team's offensive coordinator.

Kubiak also served as color commentator for the Buffalo Bulls football team, alongside play-by-play man Paul Peck, sideline reporter Scott Wilson and in-game host Brad Riter.

On November 8, 2021, Kubiak was named the inaugural head football coach for the new football program established at Hilbert College.

== Head coaching record ==
Year	Team	Overall	Conference	Standing	Bowl/playoffs
Hilbert Hawks (NCAA Division III independent) (2022)
2022	Hilbert	0–7			
Hilbert:		0–7			
Total:		0–7			

== See also ==
- List of National Football League and Arena Football League players
