= Doug Worthington =

American football player (born 1987)

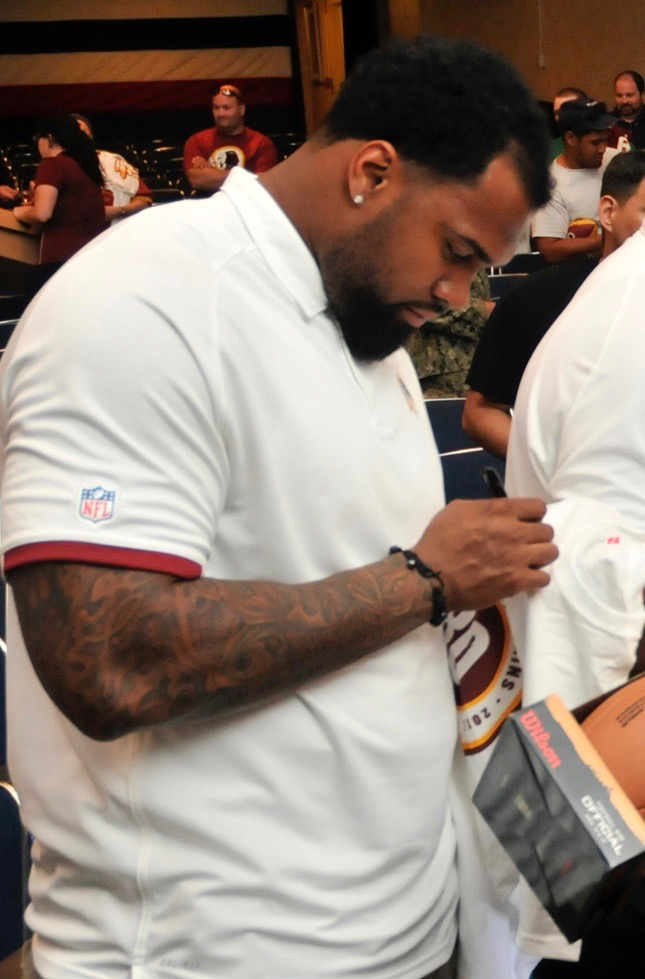
- Worthington signing autographs in 2012

No. 90, 92
- Position: Defensive tackle

Personal information
- Born: August 10, 1987 (age 39); Buffalo, New York, U.S.
- Listed height: 6 ft 5 in (1.96 m)
- Listed weight: 288 lb (131 kg)

Career information
- High school: Saint Francis (Athol Springs, New York)
- College: Ohio State (2005–2009)
- NFL draft: 2010: 7th round, 242nd overall pick

Career history
- Pittsburgh Steelers (2010)*; Tampa Bay Buccaneers (2010); Washington Redskins (2011–2013); San Diego Chargers (2014)*; St. Louis Rams (2014–2015)
- * Offseason or practice squad member only

Career NFL statistics
- Total tackles: 3
- Fumble recoveries: 1
- Stats at Pro Football Reference

Doug Worthington, Jr. (born August 10, 1987) is an American former professional football player who was a defensive tackle in the National Football League (NFL). He played college football for the Ohio State Buckeyes and was selected by the Pittsburgh Steelers with the 242nd overall pick in the seventh round of the 2010 NFL draft. He was also a member of the Tampa Bay Buccaneers, Washington Redskins, San Diego Chargers, and St. Louis Rams.

== Professional career ==
=== Pittsburgh Steelers ===
Worthington was selected in the seventh round by the Pittsburgh Steelers in the 2010 NFL draft. The Steelers signed him to a four-year contract. Worthington was waived on September 4, 2010, but signed to the practice squad two days later. On September 7, 2010, Worthington was released.

=== Tampa Bay Buccaneers ===
On November 3, 2010, the Tampa Bay Buccaneers signed Worthington to their practice squad. On December 29, 2010, Worthington was promoted to the active 53-man roster. Worthington was released on August 5, 2011.

=== Washington Redskins ===
On August 7, 2011, the Washington Redskins signed Worthington. Worthington was waived on September 3, 2011, but signed to the practice squad two days later. On December 20, 2011, Worthington was promoted to the Redskins' 53-man active roster. He didn't play any games in the 2011 season.

Worthington was released on August 31, 2012, for final cuts before the start of the 2012 season. The next day after not being claimed off waivers, he was re-signed to the team's practice squad. On September 17, he was promoted to the active roster again to replace Adam Carriker, who was placed on the injured reserve list after suffering a quad injury in Week 2 against the St. Louis Rams. He made his NFL debut in Week 4 against his former team, the Tampa Bay Buccaneers. The Redskins waived-injured Worthington on June 12, 2013, due to a biceps tendon injury. The next day he cleared waivers and was placed on the team's injured reserve.

The Redskins re-signed Worthington to a one-year contract on February 7, 2014, but he was released on August 14, 2014.

=== San Diego Chargers ===
Worthington signed with the San Diego Chargers on August 18, 2014. He was released on August 29, 2014.

=== St. Louis Rams ===
The St. Louis Rams signed Worthington to their practice squad on December 15, 2014. He signed a futures contract with the Rams on December 31.

Worthington was waived for final roster cuts before the start of the 2015 season on September 1, 2015. He was signed to the team's practice squad on September 6. He was promoted to the active roster on October 28. On November 17, he was waived, but re-signed to the practice squad two days later. On December 31, 2015, Worthington was placed on injured reserve.
