= Hilbert Hawks football =

College football team

- First season: 2022; 4 years ago
- Athletic director: Megan Valentine
- Head coach: John Noel; 1st season, 0–5 (.000)
- Location: Hamburg, New York
- Field: St. Francis High School
- NCAA division: Division III
- Conference: Liberty League
- Colors: Hilbert blue and Hilbert gold
- All-time record: 0–40 (.000)
- Mascot: Hawks
- Website: hilberthawks.com

The Hilbert Hawks football team represents Hilbert College in college football at the NCAA Division III level. The Hawks are in the Liberty League. The Hawks play their home games at St. Francis High School in Hamburg, New York.

Their head coach is John Noel, who was hired before the 2026 season.

== Conference affiliations ==
- Independent (2022–2023)
- Empire 8 (2024)
- Liberty League (2025–present)

== List of head coaches ==
=== Key ===
Key to symbols in coaches list
General		Overall		Conference		Postseason (Note: Although the first Rose Bowl Game was played in 1902, it has been continuously played since the 1916 game, and is recognized as the oldest bowl game by the NCAA. "—" indicates any season prior to 1916 when postseason games were not played.)	
No.	Order of coaches (Note: A running total of the number of head coaches, with coaches who served separate tenures being counted only once. Interim head coaches are represented with "Int" and are not counted in the running total. "—" indicates the team played but either without a coach or no coach is on record. "X" indicates an interim year without play.)	GC	Games coached	CW	Conference wins	PW	Postseason wins
DC	Division championships	OW	Overall wins	CL	Conference losses	PL	Postseason losses
CC	Conference championships	OL	Overall losses	CT	Conference ties	PT	Postseason ties
NC	National championships	OT	Overall ties (Note: Overtime rules in college football were introduced in 1996, making ties impossible in the period since.)	C%	Conference winning percentage		
†	Elected to the College Football Hall of Fame	O%	Overall winning percentage (Note: When computing the win–loss percentage, a tie counts as half a win and half a loss.)				

=== Coaches ===
List of head football coaches showing season(s) coached, overall records, conference records, postseason records, championships and selected awards
No.	Name	Season(s)	GC	OW	OL	O%	CW	CL	C%	PW	PL	DC	CC	NC	Awards
1	Jim Kubiak	2022	7	0	7	.000	–	–	–	–	–	–	–	–	–
2	Ted Egger	2023–2025	28	0	28	.000	0	14	.000	–	–	–	–	–	–
3	John Noel	2026	5	0	5	.000	0	3							

== Year-by-year results ==
National champions	Conference champions	Bowl game berth	Playoff berth

Season	Year	Head Coach	Association	Division	Conference	Record					Postseason	Final ranking
Season	Year	Head Coach	Association	Division	Conference	Overall		Conference			Postseason	Final ranking
Season	Year	Head Coach	Association	Division	Conference	Win	Loss	Finish	Win	Loss	Postseason	Final ranking
Hilbert Hawks
2022	2022	Jim Kubiak	NCAA	Division III	Independent	0	7	—	—	—	—	—
2023	2023	Ted Egger	NCAA	Division III	Independent	0	8	—	—	—	—	—
2024	2024	Ted Egger	NCAA	Division III	Empire 8	0	10	8th	0	7	—	—
2025	2025	Ted Egger	NCAA	Division III	Liberty	0	10	8th	0	7	—	—
2026	2026	John Noel	NCAA	Division III	Liberty	0	5	TBD	0	3	—	—
