= Saint Francis High School (Athol Springs, New York) =

Catholic private high school

St. Francis High School

Location
- 4129 Lake Shore Road Athol Springs; Hamburg, New York 14010; United States; 42°46′12″N 78°51′50″W

Information
- Type: Private, Boys
- Motto: Latin:Pax et Bonum; Deus Scientiarum Dominus; English: Peace and All Good; God is the Master of Knowledge
- Religious affiliations: Roman Catholic (Conventual Franciscan)
- Established: 1927; 99 years ago
- Founder: Justin Figas
- Oversight: Order of Friars Minor Conventual
- CEEB code: 330230
- President: Friar Matt Foley
- Principal: Michael Messore
- Faculty: 49
- Grades: 9-12
- Enrollment: 557 (2017)
- Student to teacher ratio: 12:1
- Campus: Overlooks Lake Erie
- Campus size: 48.5 acres (196,000 m^{2})
- Colors: Red and White
- Slogan: Success Begins at Saint Francis
- Song: "In My Own Lifetime"
- Athletics: 15 sports. Freshman, JV, and Varsity team.
- Athletics conference: Monsignor Martin Athletic Association
- Mascot: Reggie The Raider
- Nickname: Red Raiders
- Rivals: Bishop Timon – St. Jude High School; Canisius High School; St. Joseph's Collegiate Institute
- Accreditation: Middle States Association of Colleges and Schools
- Publication: The Odyssey (Literary Magazine)
- Newspaper: Banner
- Yearbook: Crusader
- Tuition: $12,870
- Website: www.stfrancishigh.org

Saint Francis High School is a Catholic, private college preparatory high school for young men that operates under the administration of Our Lady of the Angels Province of the Order of Friars Minor Conventual in Athol Springs, New York within the Diocese of Buffalo. The school was founded in 1927 by Fr. Justin Figas, OFM Conv. The school is accredited by Middle States Association of Colleges and Schools.

== Founding and development ==
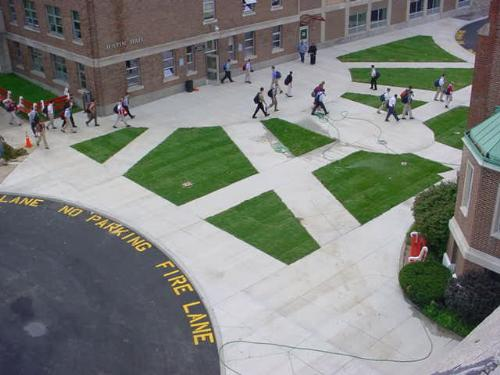
The Quad addition. In the foreground is Friar's Hall. One of the copper gnomes of the chapel can be seen. In the upper left the original Justin Hall can be seen, and to the right is the most recent addition.

The school's founder, Fr. Justin Figas, OFM Conv., wished to establish a secondary school for young men of the Polish-American immigrant community in the Niagara Frontier area in Western New York. The Conventual Franciscans of the Saint Anthony of Padua Province already owned a 32-acre (130,000 m^{2}) parcel of land on the shore of Lake Erie in the Athol Springs section of Hamburg, just outside Buffalo. The site was purchased in 1916 by Father Hyacinth Fudzinski. The land had previously been the estate of one "Dr. Pierce," who developed pharmaceuticals around the start of the 20th century. In December 1924 Father Justin assembled a group of Polish-American businessmen and professionals from Buffalo, New York to help raise funds and support for the construction of the school. This group became known as the "Father Justin Drivers," or the "Justin Drivers." The group was successful and in 1925 ground was broken for the new school in a ceremony held on 12 July 1925. Construction took sixteen months and Saint Francis High School was dedicated on 25 November 1926. In 1927 the first class was enrolled. The original structure built on campus is now called Friar's Hall.

In May 1937 the school was found to meet all requirements of the Board of Regents of the State of New York. In the fall 1943 the school became affiliated with the Catholic University of America in Washington, DC.

In the 1940s there was a great increase in student enrollment, and Father Justin again saw the need to build. This time he planned to build a dormitory/gymnasium building with a tunnel linking to the original building. In 1946 Father Justin again assembled a group of "drivers" and four years later, in 1950, ground was broken on the new complex. The gymnasium was completed first on 2 September 1951, but the dormitories were not completed for another six years. The building is now known as Justin Hall.

Renovations were done to the chapel, science labs, student dining room, residence facilities, offices, and gymnasium in the 1960s and 70s. The school was able to offer a full college preparatory curriculum for students who lived on campus, and for students who commuted daily. Enrollment again increased and increased classroom space was needed. Classrooms were made in Justin Hall where resident living was once planned. At the same time, in the late 1970s and continuing into the 1980s, the number of resident students steadily decreased. By the late 1980s, only the top floor of Justin Hall was used for residence life. At the end of the 1988 school year, the Board of Directors terminated the residency program.

In 1985 fundraising began for the construction an auditorium complex. In May 1987 ground was broken and on 29 October 1988 the John Ormsby Alumni Auditorium opened. The building was constructed adjacent to Justin Hall and includes a thrust stage with an orchestra pit in an 800-seat auditorium, a campus book store, a fitness center, and a boardroom. In 1995 the complex was completed with the construction of a band room, practice rooms, dressing rooms, offices, and storage space.

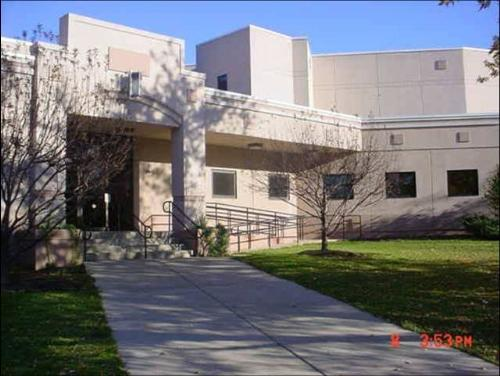
The John Ormsby Alumni Hall

In 1999, a 16.5-acre (0.067 km^{2}) parcel of land behind the school's football field on Big Tree Road was acquired. Practice fields and additional playing fields were constructed in that space. The science labs in Friar's Hall were overhauled and modernized in 2003. In November 2004 an expansion of Justin Hall and the gymnasium began. In late 2005 construction was completed and the new facility included additional classrooms; separate locker-rooms for gym classes, home teams, opposing teams, and referees; an additional gym floor, and an athletic trainer's room. At the time of construction the campus traffic pattern was also changed. Previously traffic blowed between the two major complexes on campus, essentially forming a sea of parking and traffic. The update saw the addition of a 52-space parking lot on the Lake Erie side of Friar's Hall and the creation of a traditional grass quadrangle with walkways between Friar's and Justin Halls. In 2007, construction began on the new Mary Schneider Visual Arts Center located in the lower floor of Friar's Hall. It features 4,695 sq ft (436.2 m^{2}) of floor space and includes space for art classes and storage. Also included are a new classroom and a teachers' dining room.

2010 saw an update of the school's athletic facilities with the addition of new bleachers as well as a new press box on the football field.

In 2010-2011 construction took place for new resident rooms. There are dorms for 26 residents along with an activities rooms. The dormatories opened in the 2011–2012 school year.

From 2015 to 2017, the outdoor athletic facilities were expanded and renovated. In 2015 a multi-sport synthetic turf playing surface (Polian Family Field) was installed along with a new eight lane track. 2016 saw the Gacioch Family Athletic Center completed featuring on-site home an away locker rooms, an athletic training room, an officials room, a coaches room, a viewing suite overlooking Polian Family Failed, a filming tower, a permanent home for the Fr. Rufinus Niedzwiecki OFM Conv. Sports Hall of Fame, and a concessions stand. On March 18, 2017, the varsity baseball field was dedicated as Jeff Sgroi Memorial Field in memory of long time assistant coach Jeffrey Michael Sgroi. Improvements include the addition of dugouts, a new playing surface, fencing, bullpens, storage and a scoreboard.

== Notable alumni ==
- Brian Daboll, former head coach for the New York Giants
- Kevin Kuwik, head men's basketball coach for Army
- Elliot Jacobson, drummer for singer/songwriter Ingrid Michaelson and other artists
- Patrick Kaleta, right wing for NHL's Buffalo Sabres from 2007 to 2013 (attended)
- Kevin Kobel, former Major League Baseball pitcher for Milwaukee Brewers and New York Mets
- Todd Krygier, player for NHL's Hartford Whalers, 1989–1991; Washington Capitals, 1991–1994, 1995–1998; and Anaheim Ducks, 1994-1996
- Jim Kubiak, quarterback who broke 22 passing records at U.S. Naval Academy; was on NFL's Indianapolis Colts roster for one season
- Dylan McDuffie, college football running back for the Kansas Jayhawks (attended)
- Aaron Miller, NHL defensemen, won Stanley Cup with Colorado Avalanche in 1996; played on USA Olympic Hockey Team in 1998, 2002, and 2006
- Jim Negrych, baseball player for Buffalo Bisons, AAA affiliate of Toronto Blue Jays
- Greg Olma, former Erie County Legislator known for his involvement in the Broadway-Fillmore neighborhood of Buffalo
- Brian Polian '93, head football coach at University of Nevada, Reno 2013–16; assistant coach at LSU
- Jack Quinn III, former New York State Assemblyman representing 146th District; son of former U.S. Congressman Jack Quinn
- Kyle Smith, American football executive for the Washington Redskins
- Lee Stempniak '01, right wing for NHL's Calgary Flames
- Luke Tasker, wide receiver in NFL and Canadian Football League
- Tom Telesco '91, former general manager of NFL's Las Vegas Raiders and Los Angeles Chargers
- Doug Worthington '05, NFL defensive lineman
