= A. J. Smith =

American football executive (1949–2024)

Personal information
- Born: February 28, 1949; North Smithfield, Rhode Island, U.S.
- Died: May 12, 2024 (aged 75)

Career information
- High school: Bishop Hendricken (Warwick, Rhode Island)
- College: Kentucky Wesleyan College

Career history

Playing
- Attleboro Kings (1972–1974)

Coaching
- Cranston West HS (RI) (1971–1976) Assistant coach; Rhode Island Kings (1976) Head coach; Rhode Island (1978) Assistant coach

Operations
- New York Giants (1977) Scout; New England Patriots (1978–1980) Scout; Houston Oilers (1981) Scout; Chicago Blitz (1982–1983) Scout; Pittsburgh Maulers (1984) Scout; San Diego Chargers (1985–1986) Pro personnel director; Buffalo Bills (1986–1988) Scout; Buffalo Bills (1989–1992) Assistant director of college scouting; Buffalo Bills (1993–2000) Director of pro personnel; San Diego Chargers (2001–2002) Director of pro personnel/assistant general manager; San Diego Chargers (2003–2012) General manager; Washington Redskins (2013–2015) Senior executive/consultant
- Executive profile at Pro Football Reference

Albert J. Smith (February 28, 1949 – May 12, 2024) was an American professional football scout and executive. He served as a part-time scout for several NFL and USFL teams before joining the Buffalo Bills in 1986, serving as a scout and executive for them for 14 years. With the Bills, the team won four AFC Championships. He joined the San Diego Chargers in 2001 as a director of pro personnel, and was promoted to general manager and executive vice president for them two years later. He stayed with the Chargers until being fired following the 2012 season. Smith's son, Kyle, is the assistant general manager of the Atlanta Falcons.

== Education and early career ==
Smith was a graduate of Bishop Hendricken High School in Warwick, Rhode Island, where he was a standout on the football and track teams. Smith then attended Kentucky Wesleyan College, where he graduated with a degree in health and physical education in 1971.

Following graduation, Smith served as an assistant coach at Cranston High School West from 1971 to 1976, before serving as the head coach of the Rhode Island Kings of the Eastern Football League (EFL) in 1976 and as an assistant coach at the University of Rhode Island in 1978. In addition to coaching, Smith also played semi-professionally for the Attleboro Kings of the EFL as a wide receiver from 1972 to 1974. He was given a tryout with the Washington Redskins in 1974, but was not offered a contract.

Smith worked as part-time scout for several NFL teams: New York Giants (1977), New England Patriots (1978–80), Houston Oilers (1981). At the same time, he taught physical education in the Providence, Rhode Island school system. He also served as a scout for the Chicago Blitz (1982–83) and the Pittsburgh Maulers (1984) in the USFL.

== Professional career ==
=== San Diego Chargers (first stint) ===
Smith was first hired by the Chargers in 1986 as director of pro scouting.

=== Buffalo Bills ===
He spent 14 seasons (1987–2000) with the Buffalo Bills, working his way from area scout to director of pro personnel during the team's most successful period, which included four straight Super Bowl appearances.

=== San Diego Chargers (second stint) ===
After the 2000 season, he joined former Bills executive John Butler in San Diego.

Smith was later promoted to general manager after Butler, then Chargers general manager, died of cancer in 2003. He inherited a team that was 14–34 in its previous three seasons, and had not made the playoffs since 1995. Smith directed the Chargers to five AFC West division titles and eight consecutive seasons without a losing record. San Diego's 7–9 record in 2012 was their first losing season since Smith's first season in 2003. Missing the playoffs for the third straight season, the Chargers fired Smith and head coach Norv Turner the day after the 2012 season ended. Over his tenure, Smith allowed Darren Sproles, Michael Turner and Vincent Jackson to leave the Chargers without finding adequate replacements. The Chargers' offensive line grew weak in 2012. Quarterback Philip Rivers was frequently forced to scramble and was sacked 49 times, contributing to his 22 turnovers—47 over the previous two seasons.

Due to public perceptions that he brought an arrogant approach to contract dealings and that his strategies involved high-risk/high-reward, Smith was both widely praised and criticized by fans and media.

In April 2004, a week prior to the NFL draft (in which the Chargers held the #1 overall pick), University of Mississippi quarterback Eli Manning declared he would not play for the Chargers if they drafted him. Smith ignored Manning's threats and selected him #1 without straying from his objective. Less than an hour later, Smith completed a trade with the New York Giants which sent Manning to New York in exchange for North Carolina State University quarterback Philip Rivers (drafted 4th overall), as well as a 3rd-round pick in 2004 (used to select kicker Nate Kaeding), a 1st round pick in 2005, and a 5th round pick in 2005. In 2005, the Chargers used the first round pick acquired from the Giants to select Shawne Merriman 12th overall. Merriman went on to win the AP's NFL Defensive Rookie of the Year Award. Manning went on to become the MVP of Super Bowl XLII and Super Bowl XLVI.

=== Washington Redskins ===
On March 6, 2013, Smith joined the Washington Redskins as a consultant and senior executive. Smith and Redskins general manager Bruce Allen were longtime friends. He announced his retirement on February 28, 2015, after failing to come to an agreement with the team on a contract extension.

== Honors ==
Smith was inducted into the American Football Association's Minor/Semi-Pro Football Hall of Fame in 1990.

In 2004, the Pro Football Writers of America voted Smith the executive of the year.

In 2005, Smith returned to Kentucky Wesleyan College order to attend a dedication in his honor, during which they unveiled a plaque of commemoration, naming a new training facility the "A.J. Smith Weight Room." Smith won the Kentucky Wesleyan College Alumni Achievement Award in 2010, and was inducted into their Athletic Hall of Fame in 2013.

== Personal life ==
Albert J. Smith was born on February 28, 1949, in Smithfield, Rhode Island. He married Susan Smith in 1977, and resided in Del Mar, California since 2000. The couple have two children together, a son, Kyle (born 1984), and a daughter, Andrea. Kyle is the assistant general manager for the Atlanta Falcons of the NFL, while Andrea is the director of premium services for the Anschutz Entertainment Group. Smith died of prostate cancer on May 12, 2024, at age 75.
