= Ted Egger =

American football coach (born c. 1977)

Biographical details
- Born: c. 1977 (age 48–49); Hornell, New York, U.S.
- Education: Lock Haven University (2000); Adams State University (2002)

Playing career
- 1996–1999: Lock Haven
- Position: Defensive back

Coaching career (HC unless noted)
- 2000: Lock Haven (SA)
- 2001: Texas Lutheran (DB)
- 2002–2003: Adams State (ST/OLB/DB)
- 2004: Lock Haven (DB)
- 2005–2007: Ferris State (ST/DB)
- 2008–2010: Northwood (DB)
- 2011–2014: Adams State (DC/ST)
- 2015: Concordia–St. Paul (DC/DB)
- 2016: Pearl River (DC/ST)
- 2017–2019: Pearl River
- 2020–2022: Hocking
- 2023–2025: Hilbert

Head coaching record
- Overall: 0–28 (college); 23–26 (junior college)

Theodore Egger (born c. 1977) is an American college football coach. He most recently served as the head football coach for Hilbert College, a position he held from 2023 to 2025. He was the head football coach for Pearl River Community College from 2017 to 2019 and Hocking College from 2020 to 2022. He also coached for Lock Haven, Texas Lutheran, Adams State, Ferris State, Northwood, and Concordia–St. Paul. He played college football for Lock Haven as a defensive back.

== Head coaching record ==
=== College ===
Year	Team	Overall	Conference	Standing	Bowl/playoffs
Hilbert Hawks (NCAA Division III independent) (2023)
2023	Hilbert	0–8			
Hilbert Hawks (Empire 8) (2024)
2024	Hilbert	0–10	0–7	8th	
Hilbert Hawks (Liberty League) (2025)
2025	Hilbert	0–10	0–7	8th	
Hilbert:		0–28	0–14		
Total:		0–28			

=== Junior college ===
Year	Team	Overall	Conference	Standing	Bowl/playoffs
Pearl River Wildcats (Mississippi Association of Community and Junior Colleges) (2017–2019)
2017	Pearl River	5–4	4–2	3rd (South)	
2018	Pearl River	2–7	2–5	6th (South)	
2019	Pearl River	3–6	1–4	6th (South)	
Pearl River:		10–17	7–11		
Hocking Hawks (NJCAA independent) (2020)
2020–21	Hocking	2–1			
Hocking Hawks (NJCAA Division III independent) (2021–2022)
2021	Hocking	5–5			
2022	Hocking	6–3			
Hocking:		13–9			
Total:		23–26			
