= Chris Amrhein =

American gridiron football player (born 1990)

Profile
- Position: Quarterback

Personal information
- Born: July 21, 1990 (age 36); Hingham, Massachusetts, U.S.
- Listed height: 6 ft 3 in (1.91 m)
- Listed weight: 221 lb (100 kg)

Career information
- College: Cornell
- NFL draft: 2013: undrafted

Career history
- Hamilton Tiger-Cats (2013)*
- * Offseason or practice squad member only
- Stats at CFL.ca (archive)

Joseph Christopher Amrhein Jr. (born July 21, 1990) is an American former football quarterback. He played college football at Cornell. He signed with the Hamilton Tiger-Cats of the Canadian Football League (CFL) as an undrafted free agent in 2013.

== College career ==
Amrhein served as the team's backup quarterback during the 2011 season, seeing action in one game. He completed his only pass attempt against Yale for three years. A strong-armed quarterback with excellent footwork, Amrhein missed the entire 2010 season due to a shoulder injury. Amrhein showed great potential in suiting up with the varsity as a rookie. He saw action in the home game against Fordham in 2009, completing 1-of-4 passes for six yards and an interception. Amrhein was listed as the backup on the team's two-deep throughout that season.

On October 13, 2012, he started and beat Monmouth University 41–38. He went 33 of 56, throwing for 523 yards and 1 touchdown. This was the 3rd-highest passing yards in a single game in Ivy League history.

== Professional career ==
On May 29, 2013, he signed with the Hamilton Tiger-Cats of the Canadian Football League as an undrafted free agent. On June 22, he was released.
