= 2008 Georgia Force season =

Arena Football League team season

- Head coach: Doug Plank
- Home stadium: Arena at Gwinnett Center

Results
- Record: 10–6
- Division place: 1st
- Playoffs: Lost Divisional Playoffs (Gladiators) 70–73

The 2008 Georgia Force season was the seventh season for the franchise. Starting the season 3–5, the Force finished the regular season with 7 wins in their last 8 games, ending with a 10–6 record, and winning their second consecutive Southern Division title, allowing them to enter the playoffs as the 2nd seed in the National Conference. They were eliminated from the playoffs in their first playoff game of the season by the Cleveland Gladiators, by a score of 73–70.

== Standings ==
Southern Division
Team	W	L	PCT	PF	PA	DIV	CON	Home	Away
y-Georgia Force	10	6	.625	927	848	3–3	6–4	6–2	4–4
x-Orlando Predators	9	7	.563	881	898	3–3	4–6	5–3	4–4
Tampa Bay Storm	8	8	.500	903	876	4–2	5–5	5–3	3–5
New Orleans VooDoo	8	8	.500	893	835	2–4	2–6	6–2	2–6

y - Clinched division
x - Clinched playoff berth

== Regular season schedule ==
Week	Date	Opponent	Result	Record	Location	Attendance	Recap
1	March 1	Dallas Desperados	L 41–51	0–1	The Arena at Gwinnett Center	10,224	Recap
2	March 7	at Tampa Bay Storm	L 48–69	0–2	St. Pete Times Forum	18,194	Recap
3	March 15	Los Angeles Avengers	W 58–34	1–2	The Arena at Gwinnett Center	10,156	Recap
4	March 22	at Orlando Predators	L 45–50	1–3	Amway Arena	12,107	Recap
5	March 29	at Utah Blaze	W 70–49	2–3	EnergySolutions Arena	15,240	Recap
6	April 4	Kansas City Brigade	W 70–63	3–3	The Arena at Gwinnett Center	10,052	Recap
7	Bye Week						
8	April 19	Orlando Predators	L 62–65	3–4	The Arena at Gwinnett Center	10,079	Recap
9	April 26	at Arizona Rattlers	L 61–66	3–5	US Airways Center	10,444	Recap
10	May 3	New Orleans VooDoo	W 66–39	4–5	The Arena at Gwinnett Center	10,071	Recap
11	May 12	Philadelphia Soul	W 63–62	5–5	The Arena at Gwinnett Center	10,278	Recap
12	May 18	at New York Dragons	W 72–67	6–5	Nassau Coliseum	8,634	Recap
13	May 26	at New Orleans VooDoo	W 40–29	7–5	New Orleans Arena	16,005	Recap
14	May 31	Tampa Bay Storm	W 56–55	8–5	The Arena at Gwinnett Center	10,400	Recap
15	June 7	at Columbus Destroyers	W 63–34	9–5	Nationwide Arena	12,948	Recap
16	June 14	Chicago Rush	W 50–47	10–5	The Arena at Gwinnett Center	11,073	Recap
17	June 21	at San Jose SaberCats	L 62–68	10–6	HP Pavilion	12,866	Recap

== Playoffs ==
Round	Date	Opponent (seed)	Result	Location	Attendance	Recap
NC Divisional	July 7	Cleveland Gladiators (4)	L 70–73	The Arena at Gwinnett Center	10,173	Recap

== Regular season ==
=== Week 1: vs Dallas Desperados ===
Quarter	1	2	3	4	Total
DAL	14	13	7	17	51
GA	13	7	0	21	41

at Arena at Gwinnett Center, Duluth, Georgia

- Date: March 1
- Game time: 1:00 PM EST
- Game attendance: 10,224

Game information

1st Quarter:

- 08:38 DAL – Will Pettis 1 yd pass from Clint Dolezel (Remy Hamilton kick) – 7–0 DAL
- 06:35 GA – Brent Holmes 5 yd pass from Chris Greisen (Carl Martinez kick failed) – 7–6 DAL
- 05:57 GA – Fred Coleman 0 yd fumble recovery (Carl Martinez kick) – 13–7 GA
- 01:21 DAL – Marcus Nash 8 yd pass from Clint Dolezel (Remy Hamilton kick) – 14–13 DAL

2nd Quarter:

- 13:07 GA – Troy Bergeron 5 yd pass from Chris Greisen (Carl Martinez kick) – 20–14 GA
- 08:57 DAL – Marcus Nash 10 yd pass from Clint Dolezel (Remy Hamilton kick) – 21–20 DAL
- 00:57 DAL – Will Pettis 11 yd pass from Clint Dolezel (Remy Hamilton kick failed) – 27–20 DAL

3rd Quarter:

- 12:33 DAL – Ant Armstrong 19 yd pass from Clint Dolezel (Remy Hamilton kick) – 34–20 DAL

4th Quarter:

- 12:57 GA – Brent Holmes 38 yd pass from Chris Greisen (Carl Martinez kick) – 34–27 DAL
- 08:10 DAL – Will Pettis 4 yd pass from Clint Dolezel (Remy Hamilton kick) – 41–27 DAL
- 06:29 GA – Matt MuFassa 12 yd pass from Chris Greisen (Carl Martinez kick) – 41–34 DAL
- 01:10 DAL – Ant Armstrong 6 yd pass from Clint Dolezel (Remy Hamilton kick) – 48–34 DAL
- 00:47 GA – Brent Holmes 44 yd pass from Chris Greisen (Carl Martinez kick) – 48–41 DAL
- 00:24 DAL – Remy Hamilton 20 yd field goal – 51–41 DAL
- Officials: Referee: Steve Pamon; Umpire: Tom Laverty; Linesman: Bill Ward; Line judge: Art Lucky; Back judge: Bud McCleskey
- Offensive Player of the Game: Clint Dolecel (DAL)
- Defensive Player of the Game: David Crocker (GA)
- Ironman Player of the Game: Bill Pettis (DAL)

=== Week 2: at Tampa Bay Storm ===
Quarter	1	2	3	4	Total
GA	7	13	14	14	48
TB	14	17	17	21	69

at St. Pete Times Forum, Tampa, Florida

- Date: March 7
- Game time: 7:30 PM EST
- Game attendance: 18194

Game information

1st Quarter:

- 9:34 TB – ROBINSON, Sedri 5 yd pass from DIETZ, Brett (MARLER, Seth kick) – 7–0 TB
- 4:02 GA – BERGERON, Troy 5 yd pass from GREISEN, Chris (MARTINEZ, Carlo kick) 7–7
- 00:30 TB – SHAW, Terrill 8 yd pass from DIETZ, Brett (MARLER, Seth kick) – 14–7 TB

2nd Quarter:

- 11:27 GA – MORRIS, Carl 3 yd pass from GREISEN, Chris (MARTINEZ, Carlo kick failed) – 14–13 TB
- 6:08 TB – MARLER, Seth 19 yd field goal – 17–13 TB
- 5:15 TB – ROBINSON, Sedri 6 yd net recovery (MARLER, Seth kick) – 24–13 TB
- 00:54 GA – GREISEN, Chris 1 yd run (MARTINEZ, Carlo kick) – 24–20 TB
- 00:43 TB – SHAW, Terrill 9 yd pass from DIETZ, Brett (MARLER, Seth kick) – 31–20 TB

3rd Quarter:

- 9:04 TB – EDWARDS, Hank 7 yd pass from DIETZ, Brett (MARLER, Seth kick) – 38–20 TB
- 7:21 GA – MORRIS, Carl 30 yd pass from GREISEN, Chris (MARTINEZ, Carlo kick) – 38–27 TB
- 3:10 TB – MARLER, Seth 24 yd field goal – 41–27 TB
- 2:15 TB – BRIGGS, Tom 1 yd interception return (MARLER, Seth kick) – 48–27 TB
- 00:06 GA – BERGERON, Troy 9 yd pass from GREISEN, Chris (MARTINEZ, Carlo kick) – 48–34 TB

4th Quarter:

- 12:32 TB – BROWN, Marvin 10 yd pass from DIETZ, Brett (MARLER, Seth kick) – 55–34 TB
- 8:25 GA – GREISEN, Chris 5 yd run (MARTINEZ, Carlo kick) – 55–41 TB
- 7:05 TB – ROBINSON, Sedri 9 yd pass from DIETZ, Brett (MARLER, Seth kick) – 62–41 TB
- 3:10 GA – MORRIS, Carl 13 yd pass from GREISEN, Chris (MARTINEZ, Carlo kick) – 62–48 TB
- 1:35 TB – EDWARDS, Hank 8 yd pass from DIETZ, Brett (MARLER, Seth kick) – 69–48 TB
- Officials: Referee: Dennis Lipski; Umpire: Rick Nelson; Linesman: Brent Durbin; Line judge: Darrel Leftwich; Back judge: Reggie Smith
- Offensive Player of the Game: Brett Dietz (TB)
- Defensive Player of the Game: Tom Briggs (TB)
- Ironman Player of the Game: Sedrick Robinson (TB)

=== Week 3: vs. Los Angeles Avengers ===
Quarter	1	2	3	4	Total
LA	0	7	14	13	34
GA	6	16	20	16	58

at The Arena at Gwinnett Center, Duluth, Georgia

- Date: March 15
- Game time: 7:00 PM EST
- Game attendance: 10,156

Game information

1st Quarter:

- 10:08 GA – MARSHALL, Willi 1 yd run (MARTINEZ, Carlo kick failed) – 6–0 GA

2nd Quarter:

- 14:50 LA – INGRAM, Kevin 14 yd pass from CUMBIE, Sonny (DAVIS, David kick) – 7–6 LA
- 13:06 GA – PAULEY, Charles 43 yd pass from GREISEN, Chris (MARTINEZ, Carlo kick failed) – 12–7 GA
- 07:35 GA – BERGERON, Troy 43 yd pass from GREISEN, Chris (MARTINEZ, Carlo kick) – 19–7 GA
- 00:00 GA – MARTINEZ, Carlo 19 yd field goal – 22–7 GA

3rd Quarter:

- 14:23 LA – MARSHALL, Timon 43 yd pass from CUMBIE, Sonny (DAVIS, David kick) – 22–14 GA
- 11:36 GA – PAULEY, Charles 26 yd pass from GREISEN, Chris (MARTINEZ, Carlo kick) 29–14 GA
- 08:22 LA – MARSHALL, Timon 40 yd pass from CUMBIE, Sonny (DAVIS, David kick) – 29–21 GA
- 05:53 GA – BERGERON, Troy 43 yd pass from GREISEN, Chris (MARTINEZ, Carlo kick blocked) – 35–21 GA
- 01:30 GA – CLARK, James 4 yd pass from GREISEN, Chris (MARTINEZ, Carlo kick) – 42–21 GA

4th Quarter:

- 09:41 LA – INGRAM, Kevin 10 yd pass from CUMBIE, Sonny (DAVIS, David kick failed) – 42–27 GA
- 08:45 GA – MORRIS, Carl 11 yd pass from GREISEN, Chris (MARTINEZ, Carlo kick) – 49–27 GA
- 05:32 LA – HICKS, Jarrett 8 yd pass from CUMBIE, Sonny (DAVIS, David kick) – 49–34 GA
- 02:42 GA – BERGERON, Troy 18 yd pass from GREISEN, Chris (MARTINEZ, Carlo kick) – 56–34 GA
- 01:00 GA – JOHNSON, Eric safety – 58–34 GA
- Officials: Referee: Riley Johnson; Umpire: Rick Lowe; Linesman: Julian Mapp; Line judge: RG Detillier; Back judge: Bud McCleskey
- Offensive Player of the Game: PAULEY, Charles (GA)
- Defensive Player of the Game: NEWTON, Cam (GA)
- Ironman Player of the Game: MORRIS, Carl (GA)

=== Week 4: at Orlando Predators ===
Quarter	1	2	3	4	Total
GA	21	7	10	7	45
ORL	10	21	7	12	50

at Amway Arena, Orlando, Florida

- Date: March 22
- Game time: 7:30 PM EST
- Game attendance: 12,107

Game information

1st Quarter:

- 11:02 ORL – VAUGHN, John 23 yd field goal – 3–0 ORL
- 05:41 GA – MARSHALL, W. 1 yd run (MARTINEZ, C. kick) – 7–3 GA
- 03:21 ORL – TOLIVER, T.T. 10 yd pass from STAFFORD, Shane (VAUGHN, John kick) – 10–7 ORL
- 01:21 GA – MORRIS, Carl 13 yd pass from GREISEN, Chris (MARTINEZ, C. kick) 14–10 GA
- 00:00 GA – NEWTON, Cam 7 yd fumble recovery (MARTINEZ, C. kick) 21–10 GA

2nd Quarter:

- 14:00 ORL – TOLIVER, T.T. 40 yd pass from STAFFORD, Shane (VAUGHN, John kick) – 21–17 GA
- 09:36 ORL – TOLIVER, T.T. 35 yd pass from STAFFORD, Shane (VAUGHN, John kick) – 24–21 ORL
- 04:46 GA – PAULEY, Charles 9 yd pass from GREISEN, Chris (MARTINEZ, C. kick) – 28–24 GA
- 00:04 ORL – GESSNER, Chas 1 yd pass from STAFFORD, Shane (VAUGHN, John kick) – 31–28 ORL

3rd Quarter:

- 11:11 GA – PAULEY, Charles 19 yd pass from GREISEN, Chris (MARTINEZ, C. kick) – 35–31 GA
- 04:46 GA – MARTINEZ, C. 23 yd field goal – 38–31 GA
- 02:50 ORL – MOYE-MOORE, M. 2 yd run (VAUGHN, John kick) 38–38

4th Quarter:

- 14:56 GA – PAULEY, Charles 13 yd pass from GREISEN, Chris (MARTINEZ, C. kick) – 45–38 GA
- 12:01 ORL – JOHNSON, Ron 7 yd pass from STAFFORD, Shane (VAUGHN, John kick failed) – 45–44 GA
- 00:22 ORL – GESSNER, Chas 23 yd pass from STAFFORD, Shane (STAFFORD, Shane pass failed) – 50–45 ORL
- Officials: Referee: Tom McCabe; Umpire: Wes Fritz; Linesman: Neil Brunner; Line judge: Paul Engelberts; Back judge: Tony Lombardo
- Offensive Player of the Game: T.T. Toliver (ORL)
- Defensive Player of the Game: Kenny McEntyre (ORL)
- Ironman Player of the Game: Marlon Moye-Moore (ORL)

=== Week 5: at Utah Blaze ===
Quarter	1	2	3	4	Total
GA	14	21	14	21	70
UTA	7	21	0	21	49

at EnergySolutions Arena, Salt Lake City, Utah

- Date: March 29
- Game time: 9:00 PM EST
- Game attendance: 15,240

Game information

1st Quarter:

- 09:36 GA – Matt Huebner 2 yd run (Carlos Martinez kick) – 7–0 GA
- 07:48 GA – Stephen Cason 15 yd fumble recovery (Carlos Martinez kick) – 14–0 GA
- 01:58 UTA – Aaron Boone 9 yd pass from Joe Germaine (Steve Azar kick) – 14–7 GA

2nd Quarter:

- 14:16 GA – Carl Morris 8 yd pass from Chris Greisen (Carlos Martinez kick) – 21–7 GA
- 09:53 UTA – JJ McKelvey 4 yd pass from Joe Germaine (Steve Azar kick) – 21–14 GA
- 02:53 UTA – Huey Whittaker 20 yd pass from Joe Germaine (Steve Azar kick) – 21–21
- 00:58 GA – Charles Pauley 12 yd pass from Chris Greisen (Carlos Martinez kick) – 28–21 GA
- 00:33 GA – Tiger Jones 8 yd pass from Chris Greisen (Carlos Martinez kick) – 35–21 GA
- 00:00 UTA – Huey Whittaker 9 yd pass from Joe Germaine (Steve Azar kick) – 35–28 GA

3rd Quarter:

- 10:37 GA – Tiger Jones 8 yd pass from Chris Greisen (Carlos Martinez kick) – 42–28 GA
- 02:34 GA – Tiger Jones 22 yd pass from Chris Greisen (Carlos Martinez kick) – 49–28 GA

4th Quarter:

- 14:20 UTA – Huey Whittaker 18 yd pass from Joe Germaine (Steve Azar kick) – 49–35 GA
- 12:48 GA – Carl Morris 7 yd pass from Chris Greisen (Carlos Martinez kick) – 56–35 GA
- 09:24 UTA – Huey Whittaker 28 yd pass from Joe Germaine (Steve Azar kick) – 56–42 GA
- 08:15 GA – Tiger Jones 22 yd pass from Chris Greisen (Carlos Martinez kick) – 63–42 GA
- 02:38 UTA – Aaron Boone 11 yd pass from Joe Germaine (Steve Azar kick) – 63–49 GA
- 00:21 GA – Tiger Jones 19 yd pass from Chris Greisen (Carlos Martinez kick) – 70–49 GA
- Officials: Bill Athan; Umpire: Matt Jordon; Linesman: Allen Baynes; Line judge: Rusty Baynes; Back judge: Greg Wilson
- Offensive Player of the Game: Chris Griesen (GA)
- Defensive Player of the Game: Stephen Cason (GA)
- Ironman Player of the Game: Damien Groce (GA)

=== Week 6: vs. Kansas City Brigade ===
Quarter	1	2	3	4	Total
KC	21	14	7	21	63
GA	7	21	21	21	70

at The Arena at Gwinnett Center, Duluth, Georgia

- Date: April 4
- Game time: 7:30 PM EST
- Game attendance: 10,052

Game information

1st Quarter:

- 13:55 KC – MYERS 22 yd pass from BRYANT (MARTINEZ kick) – 7–0 KC
- 12:13 KC – BROWN 5 yd interception return (MARTINEZ kick) – 14–0 KC
- 07:41 KC – FREDERICK 2 yd pass from BRYANT (MARTINEZ kick) – 21–0 KC
- 03:28 GA – JONES, Tiger 5 yd pass from GREISEN, Chris (MARTINEZ, Carlo kick) – 21–7 KC

2nd Quarter:

- 14:22 KC – BRYANT 1 yd run (MARTINEZ kick) – 28–7 KC
- 11:22 GA – MORRIS, Carl 21 yd pass from GREISEN, Chris (MARTINEZ, Carlo kick) – 28–14 KC
- 07:48 KC – HORACEK 10 yd pass from BRYANT (MARTINEZ kick) – 35–14 KC
- 06:56 GA – JONES, Tiger 30 yd pass from GREISEN, Chris (MARTINEZ, Carlo kick) – 35–21 KC
- 00:06 GA – GROCE, Damien 1 yd run (MARTINEZ, Carlo kick) – 35–28 KC

3rd Quarter:

- 13:52 GA – MORRIS, Carl 47 yd pass from GREISEN, Chris (MARTINEZ, Carlo kick) – 35–35
- 10:09 GA – NEWTON, Cam 45 yd interception return (MARTINEZ, Carlo kick) – 42–35 GA
- 03:52 KC – MOSS 3 yd run (MARTINEZ kick) – 42–42
- 02:08 GA – MORRIS, Carl 7 yd pass from GREISEN, Chris (MARTINEZ, Carlo kick) – 49–42 GA

4th Quarter:

- 14:49 KC – MYERS 36 yd pass from BRYANT (MARTINEZ kick) – 49–49
- 12:12 GA – MORRIS, Carl 28 yd pass from GREISEN, Chris (MARTINEZ, Carlo kick) – 56–49 GA
- 07:52 KC – MYERS 10 yd pass from BRYANT (MARTINEZ kick) – 56–56
- 05:05 GA – JONES, Tiger 5 yd pass from GREISEN, Chris (MARTINEZ, Carlo kick) – 63–56 GA
- 03:35 GA – NEWTON, Cam 14 yd interception return (MARTINEZ, Carlo kick) – 70–56 GA
- 00:55 KC – MYERS 3 yd pass from BRYANT (MARTINEZ kick) – 70–63 GA
- Officials: Referee: Bill LeMonnier; Umpire: Mike Delany; Linesman: Shawn Hochuli; Line judge: Dirk Bell; Back judge: Billy Beckett
- Offensive Player of the Game: Carl Morris (GA)
- Defensive Player of the Game: Cam Newton (GA)
- Ironman Player of the Game: James Whitley (GA)

=== Week 7 ===
Bye Week

=== Week 8: vs. Orlando Predators ===
Quarter	1	2	3	4	Total
ORL	21	10	14	20	65
GA	7	26	14	15	62

at The Arena at Gwinnett Center, Duluth, Georgia

- Date: April 19
- Game time: 7:00 PM EST
- Game attendance: 10,009

Game information

1st Quarter:

- 10:50 ORL – GESSNER, Chas 8 yd pass from STAFFORD, Shane (VAUGHN, John kick) – 7–0 ORL
- 08:17 ORL – MCENTYRE, Kenny 13 yd interception return (VAUGHN, John kick) – 14–0 ORL
- 04:11 GA – BERGERON, Troy 4 yd pass from GREISEN, Chris (MARTINEZ, Carlo kick) – 14–7 ORL
- 00:28 ORL – ARMSTRONG, Odie 33 yd pass from STAFFORD, Shane (VAUGHN, John kick) – 21–7 ORL

2nd Quarter:

- 12:52 GA – MORRIS, Carl 4 yd pass from GREISEN, Chris (MARTINEZ, Carlo kick) – 21–14 ORL
- 09:19 ORL – VAUGHN, John 33 yd field goal – 24–14 ORL
- 04:50 GA – MARTINEZ, Carlo 29 yd field goal – 24–17 ORL
- 02:55 GA – NEWTON, Cam 12 yd interception return (MARTINEZ, Carlo kick) – 24–24
- 00:45 GA – HUEBNER, Matt 1 yd run (MARTINEZ, Carlo kick failed) – 30–24 GA
- 00:25 ORL – ARMSTRONG, Odie 18 yd pass from STAFFORD, Shane (VAUGHN, John kick) – 31–30 ORL
- 00:00 GA – MARTINEZ, Carlo 31 yd field goal – 33–31 GA

3rd Quarter:

- 09:56 ORL – JOHNSON, Ron 3 yd pass from EATON, Jake (VAUGHN, John kick) – 38–33 ORL
- 08:32 GA – JONES, Tiger 24 yd pass from GREISEN, Chris (MARTINEZ, Carlo kick) – 40–38 GA
- 04:26 ORL – GESSNER, Chas 14 yd pass from EATON, Jake (VAUGHN, John kick) – 45–40 ORL
- 00:47 GA – JONES, Tiger 13 yd pass from GREISEN, Chris (MARTINEZ, Carlo kick) – 47–45 ORL

4th Quarter:

- 10:51 ORL – STAFFORD, Shane 1 yd run (VAUGHN, John kick) – 52–47 ORL
- 08:51 GA – HUEBNER, Matt 2 yd run (MARTINEZ, Carlo kick) – 54–52 GA
- 06:16 GA – SMITH, Jermaine safety – 56–52 GA
- 05:39 GA – BERGERON, Troy 35 yd pass from GREISEN, Chris (MARTINEZ, Carlo kick failed) – 62–52 GA
- 03:30 ORL – GESSNER, Chas 1 yd pass from STAFFORD, Shane (VAUGHN, John kick) – 62–59 GA
- 00:05 ORL – GESSNER, Chas 8 yd pass from STAFFORD, Shane (VAUGHN, John kick failed) – 65–62 ORL
- Officials: Referee: Riley Johnson; Umpire: Rick Lowe; Linesman: Julian Mapp; Line judge: RG Detillier; Back judge: Bud McCleskey
- Offensive Player of the Game: Odie Armstrong (ORL)
- Defensive Player of the Game: Ernest Allen (GA)
- Ironman Player of the Game: T.T. Toliver (ORL)

=== Week 9: at Arizona Rattlers ===
Quarter	1	2	3	4	Total
GA	21	21	7	12	61
ARZ	21	21	14	10	66

at US Airways Center, Phoenix, Arizona

- Date: April 26
- Game time: 10:00 PM EST
- Game attendance: 10,444

Game information

1st Quarter:

- 14:24 ARZ – Trandon Harvey 31 yd pass from Lang Campbell (Eric Houle kick) – 7–0 ARZ
- 13:10 ARZ – Todd Devoe 7 yd pass from Lang Campbell (Eric Houle kick) – 14–0 ARZ
- 11:19 GA – Tiger Jones 27 yd pass from Chris Greisen (Carlos Martinez kick) – 14–7 ARZ
- 09:46 ARZ – Siaha Burley 25 yd pass from Lang Campbell (Eric Houle kick) – 21–7 ARZ
- 05:56 GA – Chris Greisen 1 yd run (Carlos Martinez kick) – 21–14 ARZ
- 04:45 GA – Carl Morris 0 yd net recovery (Carlos Martinez kick) – 21–21

2nd Quarter:

- 11:35 ARZ – Siaha Burley 4 yd pass from Lang Campbell (Eric Houle kick) – 28–21 ARZ
- 08:10 GA – Tiger Jones 25 yd pass from Chris Greisen (Carlos Martinez kick) – 28–28
- 07:18 ARZ – Trandon Harvey 58 yd kickoff return (Eric Houle kick) – 35–28 ARZ
- 05:37 GA – James Clark 16 yd pass from Chris Greisen (Carlos Martinez kick) – 35–35
- 00:31 GA – Tiger Jones 31 yd pass from Chris Greisen (Carlos Martinez kick) – 42–35 GA
- 00:19 ARA – Chris Robinson 1 yd run (Eric Houle kick) – 42–42

3rd Quarter:

- 12:35 GA – Tiger Jones 16 yd pass from Chris Greisen (Carlos Martinez kick) – 49–42 GA
- 07:19 ARZ – Trandon Harvey 8 yd pass from Lang Campbell (Eric Houle kick) – 49–49
- 02:54 ARZ – Chris Robinson 3 yd run (Eric Houle kick) – 56–49 ARZ

4th Quarter:

- 10:35 ARZ – Chris Robinson 1 yd run (Eric Houle kick) – 63–49 ARZ
- 06:47 GA – Damien Groce 6 yd pass from Chris Greisen (Carlos Martinez kick failed) – 63–55 ARZ
- 02:45 ARZ – Eric Houle 25 yd field goal – 66–55 ARZ
- 01:50 GA – Carl Morris 19 yd pass from Chris Greisen (Chris Greisen pass failed) – 66–61 ARZ
- Officials: Referee: GARVEY, Pat; Umpire: KING, Paul; Linesman: WARD, Bill; Line judge: MCELWEE, Bob; Back judge: DEBELL, James
- Offensive Player of the Game: Tiger Jones (GA)
- Defensive Player of the Game: Aric Williams (ARZ)
- Ironman Player of the Game: Trandon Harvey (ARZ)

=== Week 10: vs. New Orleans VooDoo ===
Quarter	1	2	3	4	Total
NO	12	7	13	7	39
GA	21	17	14	14	66

at The Arena at Gwinnett Center, Duluth, Georgia

- Date: May 3
- Game time: 7:00 PM EST
- Game attendance: 10,071

Game information

1st Quarter:

- 10:32 GA – HUEBNER, Matt 2 yd run (MARTINEZ, Carlo kick) – 7–0 GA
- 09:01 GA – GROCE, Damien 4 yd run (MARTINEZ, Carlo kick) – 14–0 GA
- 08:01 NO – WILLIAMS, Willi 35 yd pass from WIMPRINE, Danny (FRANCE, Todd kick failed) – 14–6 GA
- 04:59 GA – BERGERON, Troy 15 yd pass from GREISEN, Chris (MARTINEZ, Carlo kick) – 21–6 GA
- 01:13 NO – KEY, Sale 2 yd pass from WIMPRINE, Danny (TANNEY, Mitch pass failed) – 21–12 GA

2nd Quarter:

- 10:48 GA – MARTINEZ, Carlo 34 yd field goal – 24–12 GA
- 05:55 GA – MILLIGAN, Hamin 3 yd pass from GREISEN, Chris (MARTINEZ, Carlo kick) – 31–12 GA
- 00:35 GA – BERGERON, Troy 32 yd pass from GREISEN, Chris (MARTINEZ, Carlo kick) – 38–12 GA
- 00:11 NO – RUBIN, DeAndrew 6 yd pass from WIMPRINE, Danny (FRANCE, Todd kick) – 38–19 GA

3rd Quarter:

- 14:21 NO – RUBIN, DeAndrew 23 yd pass from WIMPRINE, Danny (FRANCE, Todd kick) – 38–26 GA
- 11:30 GA – JONES, Tiger 16 yd pass from GREISEN, Chris (MARTINEZ, Carlo kick) – 45–26 GA
- 07:27 NO – LYNCH, James 2 yd run (FRANCE, Todd kick failed) – 45–32 GA
- 05:54 GA – BERGERON, Troy 43 yd pass from GREISEN, Chris (MARTINEZ, Carlo kick) – 52–32 GA

4th Quarter:

- 14:17 NO – KEY, Sale 3 yd pass from WIMPRINE, Danny (FRANCE, Todd kick) – 52–39 GA
- 13:34 GA – BERGERON, Troy 4 yd pass from GREISEN, Chris (MARTINEZ, Carlo kick) – 59–39 GA
- 04:46 GA – GREISEN, Chris 7 yd run (MARTINEZ, Carlo kick) – 66–39 GA
- Officials: Referee: David Cutaia; Umpire: Al Granado; Linesman: Mike McCabe; Line judge: Art Lucky; Back judge: James Cole
- Offensive Player of the Game: Troy Bergeron (GA)
- Defensive Player of the Game: Hamin Milligan (GA)
- Ironman Player of the Game: Carl Morris (GA)

=== Week 11: vs. Philadelphia Soul ===
Quarter	1	2	3	4	Total
PHI	14	21	21	6	62
GA	7	27	7	22	63

at The Arena at Gwinnett Center, Duluth, Georgia

- Date: May 12
- Game time: 8:00 PM EST
- Game attendance: 10,278

Game information

1st Quarter:

- 10:36 GA – HUEBNER, Matt 1 yd run (MARTINEZ, Carlo kick) – 7–0 GA
- 07:41 PHI – SMITH, Clifton 1 yd run (HUGHES, Connor kick) – 7–7
- 06:13 PHI – SCOTT, Sean 0 yd net recovery (HUGHES, Connor kick) – 14–7 PHI

2nd Quarter:

- 14:56 GA – GROCE, Damien 3 yd run (MARTINEZ, Carlo kick) – 14–14
- 13:06 PHI – BOGLE, Phil 13 yd pass from D'ORAZIO, Matt (HUGHES, Connor kick) – 21–14 PHI
- 10:28 GA – BERGERON, Troy 22 yd pass from GREISEN, Chris (MARTINEZ, Carlo kick) – 21–21
- 06:08 GA – JONES, Tiger 45 yd pass from GREISEN, Chris (MARTINEZ, Carlo kick) – 28–21 GA
- 02:41 PHI – HENDERSON, Ken 13 yd pass from D'ORAZIO, Matt (HUGHES, Connor kick) – 28–28
- 01:14 GA – HUEBNER, Matt 6 yd pass from GREISEN, Chris (MARTINEZ, Carlo kick failed) – 34–28 GA
- 00:03 PHI – SMITH, Clifton 1 yd run (HUGHES, Connor kick) – 35–34 PHI

3rd Quarter:

- 12:17 PHI – HENDERSON, Ken 3 yd pass from D'ORAZIO, Matt (HUGHES, Connor kick) – 42–34 PHI
- 05:23 PHI – BRACKINS, Larry 8 yd pass from D'ORAZIO, Matt (HUGHES, Connor kick) – 49–34 PHI
- 01:49 GA – HUEBNER, Matt 1 yd run (MARTINEZ, Carlo kick) – 49–41 PHI
- 00:05 PHI – BRACKINS, Larry 22 yd pass from D'ORAZIO, Matt (HUGHES, Connor kick) – 56–41 PHI

4th Quarter:

- 07:25 PHI – SMITH, Clifton 7 yd run (HUGHES, Connor kick failed) – 62–41 PHI
- 02:43 GA – GREISEN, Chris 1 yd run (MARTINEZ, Carlo kick) – 62–48 PHI
- 00:42 GA – BERGERON, Troy 7 yd pass from GREISEN, Chris (MARTINEZ, Carlo kick) – 62–55 PHI
- 00:16 GA – BERGERON, Troy 11 yd pass from GREISEN, Chris (BERGERON, Troy pass from GREISEN, Chris) – 63–62 GA
- Officials: Referee: Dave Lambros; Umpire: Doug Wilson; Linesman: Kelly Saalfeld; Line judge: Brian Matthew; Back judge: Rich Wilborn
- Offensive Player of the Game: Troy Bergeron (GA)
- Defensive Player of the Game: Clifton Smith (PHI)
- Ironman Player of the Game: Matt Huebner (GA)

=== Week 12: at New York Dragons ===
Quarter	1	2	3	4	Total
GA	14	14	14	30	72
NY	7	34	13	13	67

at Nassau Veterans Memorial Coliseum, Uniondale, New York

- Date: May 18
- Game time: 3:00 PM EST
- Game attendance: 8,634

Game information

1st Quarter:

- 12:51 GA – Troy Bergeron 26 yd pass from Chris Greisen (Carlos Martinez kick) – 7–0 GA
- 07:20 NY – Chris Anthony 6 yd pass from Aaron Garcia (Steve Azar kick) – 7–7
- 01:41 GA – Tiger Jones 4 yd pass from Chris Greisen (Carlos Martinez kick) – 14–7 GA

2nd Quarter:

- 14:54 NY – Kevin Swayne 12 yd pass from Aaron Garcia (Steve Azar kick failed) – 14–13 GA
- 12:07 GA – Tiger Jones 8 yd pass from Chris Greisen (Carlos Martinez kick) – 21–13 GA
- 10:57 NY – Jason Willis 45 yd pass from Aaron Garcia (Steve Azar kick failed) – 21–19 GA
- 09:04 GA – Tiger Jones 42 yd pass from Chris Greisen (Carlos Martinez kick) – 28–19 GA
- 04:44 NY – Kevin Swayne 6 yd pass from Aaron Garcia (Steve Azar kick) – 28–26 GA
- 02:26 NY – Jason Willis 10 yd pass from Aaron Garcia (Kevin Swayne pass from Aaron Garcia) – 34–28 NY
- 00:00 NY – Kevin Swayne 3 yd pass from Aaron Garcia (Steve Azar kick) – 41–28 NY

3rd Quarter:

- 10:47 GA – Tiger Jones 15 yd pass from Chris Greisen (Carlos Martinez kick) – 41–35 NY
- 07:08 NY – Jason Willis 15 yd pass from Aaron Garcia (Steve Azar kick) – 48–35 NY
- 03:03 GA – Tiger Jones 4 yd pass from Chris Greisen (Carlos Martinez kick) – 48–42 NY
- 00:55 NY – Chris Anthony 31 yd pass from Aaron Garcia (Ricky Hall rush failed) – 54–42 NY

4th Quarter:

- 10:53 GA – Troy Bergeron 5 yd pass from Chris Greisen (Carlos Martinez kick) – 54–49 NY
- 09:51 GA – Carl Morris 26 yd pass from Chris Greisen (Carlos Martinez kick failed) – 55–54 GA
- 04:44 NY – Jason Willis 1 yd pass from Aaron Garcia (Aaron Garcia rush failed) – 60–55 NY
- 02:29 GA – Matt Huebner 2 yd run (Carlos Martinez kick) – 62–60 GA
- 00:53 NY – Kevin Swayne 10 yd pass from Aaron Garcia (Steve Azar kick) – 67–62 NY
- 00:09 GA – Tiger Jones 28 yd pass from Chris Greisen (Matt Huebner rush) – 70–67 GA
- 00:00 GA – Matt Huebner safety – 72–67 GA
- Officials: Referee: Riley Johnson; Umpire: Rick Lowe; Linesman: Julian Mapp; Line judge: RG Detillier; Back judge: Bud McCleskey
- Offensive Player of the Game: Tiger Jones (GA)
- Defensive Player of the Game: Billy Parker (NY)
- Ironman Player of the Game: Matt Huebner (GA)

=== Week 13: at New Orleans VooDoo ===
Quarter	1	2	3	4	Total
GA	14	7	6	13	40
NO	10	13	6	0	29

at New Orleans Arena, New Orleans, Louisiana

- Date: May 26
- Game time: 8:00 PM EST
- Game attendance: 16,005

Game information

1st Quarter:

- 12:56 GA – Bergeron, T. 21 yd pass from Greisen, C. (Martinez, C. kick) – 7–0 GA
- 09:23 NO – Lynch, J. 24 yd pass from Wimprine, D. (Ruffin, J. kick) – 7–7
- 07:11 GA – Clark, J. 18 yd pass from Morris, C. (Martinez, C. kick) – 14–7 GA
- 01:11 NO – Ruffin, J. 29 yd field goal – 14–10 GA

2nd Quarter:

- 11:40 GA – Huebner, M. 4 yd pass from Greisen, C. (Martinez, C. kick) – 21–10 GA
- 06:16 NO – Lynch, J. 9 yd pass from Wimprine, D. (Ruffin, J. kick) – 21–17 GA
- 00:25 NO – Key, S. 5 yd pass from Wimprine, D. (Ruffin, J. kick failed) – 23–21 NO

3rd Quarter:

- 08:55 NO – Wimprine, D. 4 yd run (Ruffin, J. rush failed) – 29–21 NO
- 02:48 GA – Greisen, C. 1 yd run (Martinez, C. kick failed) – 29–27 NO

4th Quarter:

- 12:33 GA – Jones, T. 8 yd pass from Greisen, C. (Martinez, C. kick) – 34–29 GA
- 06:13 GA – Bergeron, T. 15 yd pass from Greisen, C. (Martinez, C. kick failed) – 40–29 GA
- Officials: Referee: Bill Athan; Umpire: Matt Jordan; Linesman: Allen Baynes; Line judge: Rusty Baynes; Back judge: Greg Wilson
- Offensive Player of the Game: Chris Greisen (GA)
- Defensive Player of the Game: Stephen Cason (GA)
- Ironman Player of the Game: Carl Morris (GA)

=== Week 14: vs. Tampa Bay Storm ===
Quarter	1	2	3	4	Total
TB	13	14	14	14	55
GA	14	14	0	28	56

at The Arena at Gwinnett Center, Duluth, Georgia

- Date: May 31
- Game time: 7:00 PM EST
- Game attendance: 10,400

Game information

1st Quarter:

- 11:12 TB – MARSHALL, Torra 1 yd run (MARLER, Seth kick) – 7–0 TB
- 08:32 GA – MORRIS, Carl 31 yd pass from GREISEN, Chris (MARTINEZ, Carlo kick) – 7–7
- 04:20 TB – MARSHALL, Torra 3 yd run (MARLER, Seth kick failed) – 13–7 TB
- 01:29 GA – MORRIS, Carl 14 yd pass from GREISEN, Chris (MARTINEZ, Carlo kick) – 14–13 GA

2nd Quarter:

- 12:51 GA – HUEBNER, Matt 1 yd run (MARTINEZ, Carlo kick) – 21–13 GA
- 08:03 TB – MARSHALL, Torra 4 yd run (MARLER, Seth kick)- 21–20 GA
- 02:40 GA – MORRIS, Carl 7 yd pass from GREISEN, Chris (MARTINEZ, Carlo kick) – 28–20 GA
- 00:01 TB – TIMMONS, Tyrone 2 yd pass from DIETZ, Brett (MARLER, Seth kick) – 28–27 GA

3rd Quarter:

- 13:40 TB – SHAW, Terrill 37 yd pass from DIETZ, Brett (MARLER, Seth kick) – 34–28 TB
- 04:14 TB – TIMMONS, Tyrone 22 yd pass from DIETZ, Brett (MARLER, Seth kick) – 41–28 TB

4th Quarter:

- 13:09 GA – HUEBNER, Matt 3 yd run (MARTINEZ, Carlo kick) – 41–35 TB
- 08:59 TB – TIMMONS, Tyrone 15 yd pass from DIETZ, Brett (MARLER, Seth kick) – 48–35 TB
- 06:04 GA – JONES, Tiger 9 yd pass from GREISEN, Chris (MARTINEZ, Carlo kick) – 48–42 TB
- 04:27 TB – MARSHALL, Torra 4 yd run (MARLER, Seth kick) – 55–42 TB
- 01:34 GA – HUEBNER, Matt 1 yd run (MARTINEZ, Carlo kick) – 55–49 TB
- 00:00 GA – GREISEN, Chris 1 yd run (MARTINEZ, Carlo kick) – 56–55 GA
- Officials: Referee: Perry Havener; Umpire: Tom Laverty; Linesman: Allen Baynes; Line judge: David Meslow; Back judge: Keith Washington
- Offensive Player of the Game: Carl Morris (GA)
- Defensive Player of the Game: Traco Rachal (TB)
- Ironman Player of the Game: Matt Huebner (GA)

=== Week 15: at Columbus Destroyers ===
Quarter	1	2	3	4	Total
GA	14	21	14	14	63
CLB	7	13	7	7	34

at Nationwide Arena, Columbus, Ohio

- Date: June 7
- Game time: 7:00 PM EST
- Game attendance: 12,948

Game information

1st Quarter:

- 11:58 GA – BERGERON, Troy 14 yd pass from GREISEN, Chris (MARTINEZ, Carlo kick) – 7–0 GA
- 07:01 CLB – LEE, Derek 5 yd pass from NAGY, Matt (LEWIS, Mark kick) – 7–7
- 03:57 GA – JONES, Tiger 6 yd pass from GREISEN, Chris (MARTINEZ, Carlo kick) – 14–7 GA

2nd Quarter:

- 13:15 GA – BERGERON, Troy 34 yd pass from GREISEN, Chris (MARTINEZ, Carlo kick) – 21–7 GA
- 08:06 CLB – WELLS, Harold 3 yd run (LEWIS, Mark kick failed) – 21–13 GA
- 06:41 GA – BERGERON, Troy 49 yd pass from GREISEN, Chris (MARTINEZ, Carlo kick) – 28–13 GA
- 03:34 CLB – WELLS, Harold 1 yd run (LEWIS, Mark kick) – 28–20 GA
- 00:55 GA – MORRIS, Carl 7 yd pass from GREISEN, Chris (MARTINEZ, Carlo kick) – 35–20 GA

3rd Quarter:

- 11:25 CLB – THOMPSON, Leroy 3 yd pass from NAGY, Matt (LEWIS, Mark kick) – 35–27 GA
- 07:55 GA – JONES, Tiger 8 yd pass from GREISEN, Chris (MARTINEZ, Carlo kick) – 42–27 GA
- 05:03 GA – ALLEN, Ernest 0 yd fumble recovery (MARTINEZ, Carlo kick) – 49–27 GA

4th Quarter:

- 13:54 GA – BERGERON, Troy 24 yd pass from GREISEN, Chris (MARTINEZ, Carlo kick) – 56–27 GA
- 03:34 GA – MORRIS, Carl 1 yd run (MARTINEZ, Carlo kick) – 63–27 GA
- 01:27 CLB – JOHNSON, C.J. 32 yd pass from NAGY, Matt (LEWIS, Mark kick) – 63–34 GA
- Officials: Referee: Tom McCabe; Umpire: Rick Podraza; Linesman: Rod Pearson; Line judge: Dana McKenzie; Back judge: Scott Helverson
- Offensive Player of the Game: Troy Bergeron (GA)
- Defensive Player of the Game: JoJo Polk (GA)
- Ironman Player of the Game: Leroy Thompson (CLB)

=== Week 16: vs. Chicago Rush ===
Quarter	1	2	3	4	Total
CHI	6	14	14	13	47
GA	14	13	7	16	50

at The Arena at Gwinnett Center, Duluth, Georgia

- Date: June 14
- Game time: 7:00 PM EST
- Game attendance: 11,073

Game information

1st Quarter:

- 10:22 GA – MORRIS, Carl 6 yd pass from GREISEN, Chris (MARTINEZ, Carlo kick) – 7–0 GA
- 06:30 CHI – MORGAN, Donovan 2 yd run (O'DONNELL, Joe kick failed) – 7–6 GA
- 05:25 GA – MORRIS, Carl 30 yd pass from GREISEN, Chris (MARTINEZ, Carlo kick) – 14–6 GA

2nd Quarter:

- 08:17 GA – MORRIS, Carl 21 yd pass from GREISEN, Chris (MARTINEZ, Carlo kick failed) – 20–6 GA
- 04:57 CHI – LATENDRESSE, Tra 24 yd pass from MICHNA, Russ (O'DONNELL, Joe kick) – 20–13 GA
- 01:14 GA – BERGERON, Troy 7 yd pass from GREISEN, Chris (MARTINEZ, Carlo kick) – 27–13 GA
- 00:00 CHI – MORGAN, Donovan 3 yd pass from MICHNA, Russ (O'DONNELL, Joe kick) – 27–20 GA

3rd Quarter:

- 10:45 CHI – LATENDRESSE, Tra 22 yd pass from MICHNA, Russ (O'DONNELL, Joe kick) – 27–27
- 06:20 GA – GRICE, Shane 7 yd pass from GREISEN, Chris (MARTINEZ, Carlo kick) – 34–27 GA
- 04:34 CHI – MORGAN, Donovan 33 yd pass from MICHNA, Russ (O'DONNELL, Joe kick) – 34–34

4th Quarter:

- 14:14 GA – MORRIS, Carl 4 yd pass from GREISEN, Chris (MARTINEZ, Carlo kick) – 41–34 GA
- 09:47 CHI – MICHNA, Russ 4 yd run (O'DONNELL, Joe kick) – 41–41
- 05:50 GA – GREISEN, Chris 14 yd run (MARTINEZ, Carlo kick) – 48–41 GA
- 03:07 GA – THOMPSON, Will safety – 50–41 GA
- 00:43 CHI – MORGAN, Donovan 3 yd pass from MICHNA, Russ (O'DONNELL, Joe kick failed) – 50–47 GA
- Officials: Referee: Bill Mccabe; Umpire: Wes Fritz; Linesman: Neil Brunner; Line judge: Paul Engleberts; Back judge: Tony Lombardo
- Offensive Player of the Game: Chris Greisen (GA)
- Defensive Player of the Game: Will Thompson (GA)
- Ironman Player of the Game: Carl Morris (GA)

=== Week 17: at San Jose SaberCats ===
Quarter	1	2	3	4	Total
GA	14	21	21	6	62
SJ	14	21	20	13	68

at HP Pavilion at San Jose, San Jose, California

- Date: June 21
- Game time: 10:30 PM EST
- Game attendance: 12,866

Game information

1st Quarter:

- 11:49 GA – JONES, Tiger 7 yd pass from GREISEN, Chris (MARTINEZ, Carlo kick failed) – 6–0 GA
- 10:04 SJ – SAINTIL, Cleann 15 yd pass from GRIEB, Mark (HAGLUND, A.J. kick) – 7–6 SJ
- 04:59 GA – HUEBNER, Matt 1 yd run (HUEBNER, Matt pass from MARTINEZ, Carlo) – 14–7 GA
- 00:51 SJ – SAINTIL, Cleann 4 yd pass from GRIEB, Mark (HAGLUND, A.J. kick) – 14–14

2nd Quarter:

- 14:19 GA – JONES, Tiger 30 yd pass from GREISEN, Chris (MARTINEZ, Carlo kick) – 21–14 GA
- 08:32 GA – MORRIS, Carl 13 yd pass from GREISEN, Chris (MARTINEZ, Carlo kick) – 28–14 GA
- 02:57 SJ – SAINTIL, Cleann 6 yd pass from GRIEB, Mark (HAGLUND, A.J. kick) – 28–21 SJ
- 00:41 SJ – THOMAS, Clevan 35 yd interception return (HAGLUND, A.J. kick) – 28–28
- 00:30 SJ – SAINTIL, Cleann 16 yd pass from GRIEB, Mark (HAGLUND, A.J. kick) – 35–28 SJ
- 00:17 GA – MORRIS, Carl 46 yd pass from GREISEN, Chris (MARTINEZ, Carlo kick) – 35–35

3rd Quarter:

- 14:28 SJ – WRIGHT, Rodney 39 yd pass from GRIEB, Mark (HAGLUND, A.J. kick) – 42–35 GA
- 12:05 GA – PAULEY, Charles 24 yd pass from GREISEN, Chris (MARTINEZ, Carlo kick) – 42–42
- 09:08 SJ – SAINTIL, Cleann 31 yd pass from GRIEB, Mark (HAGLUND, A.J. kick failed) – 48–42 SJ
- 06:47 GA – MORRIS, Carl 13 yd pass from GREISEN, Chris (MARTINEZ, Carlo kick) – 49–48 GA
- 04:48 SJ – JOHNSON, Brian 15 yd pass from GRIEB, Mark (HAGLUND, A.J. kick) – 55–49 SJ
- 02:48 GA – MORRIS, Carl 28 yd pass from GREISEN, Chris (MARTINEZ, Carlo kick) – 56–55 GA

4th Quarter:

- 13:00 SJ – SAINTIL, Cleann 13 yd pass from GRIEB, Mark (HAGLUND, A.J. kick failed) – 61–56 SJ
- 09:41 GA – JONES, Tiger 3 yd pass from GREISEN, Chris (MARTINEZ, Carlo kick failed) – 62–61 GA
- 05:35 SJ – SAINTIL, Cleann 11 yd pass from GRIEB, Mark (HAGLUND, A.J. kick) – 68–62 SJ
- Officials: Referee: Perry Havener; Umpire: Tom Laverty; Linesman: Kavin McGrath; Line judge: David Meslow; Back judge: Keith Washington
- Offensive Player of the Game: Mark Grieb (SJ)
- Defensive Player of the Game: Clevan Thomas (SJ)
- Ironman Player of the Game: Rodney Wright (SJ)

== Playoffs ==
=== National Conference Divisional: vs. (4) Cleveland Gladiators ===
Quarter	1	2	3	4	Total
(4) CLE	7	33	20	13	73
(2) GA	14	28	7	21	70

at The Arena at Gwinnett Center, Duluth, Georgia

- Date: July 7
- Game time: 8:00 PM EST
- Game attendance: 10,173

Game information

1st Quarter:

- 10:04 GA – JONES, Tiger 6 yd pass from GREISEN, Chris (MARTINEZ, Carlo kick) – 7–0 GA
- 04:27 CLE – RUE, Joshua 2 yd run (BALL, Jason kick) – 7–7
- 00:13 GA – BERGERON, Troy 4 yd pass from GREISEN, Chris (MARTINEZ, Carlo kick) – 14–7 GA

2nd Quarter:

- 13:46 CLE – AMEY, Otis 23 yd pass from PHILYAW, Raymon (BALL, Jason kick failed) – 14–13 GA
- 11:31 GA – JONES, Tiger 15 yd pass from GREISEN, Chris (MARTINEZ, Carlo kick) – 21–13 GA
- 09:30 CLE – AMEY, Otis 42 yd pass from PHILYAW, Raymon (BALL, Jason kick) – 21–20 GA
- 06:14 GA – HUEBNER, Matt 2 yd run (MARTINEZ, Carlo kick) – 28–20 GA
- 03:27 CLE – HYMES, Randy 33 yd pass from PHILYAW, Raymon (BALL, Jason kick) – 28–27 GA
- 02:49 CLE – HEFFLIN, Brando 3 yd net recovery (BALL, Jason kick failed) – 33–28 CLE
- 01:15 GA – BERGERON, Troy 7 yd pass from GREISEN, Chris (MARTINEZ, Carlo kick) – 35–33 GA
- 00:33 GA – BERGERON, Troy 21 yd pass from GREISEN, Chris (MARTINEZ, Carlo kick) – 42–33 GA
- 00:05 CLE – REDD, Robert 11 yd pass from PHILYAW, Raymon (BALL, Jason kick) – 42–40 GA

3rd Quarter:

- 12:01 CLE – RUE, Joshua 10 yd run (BALL, Jason kick failed) – 46–42 CLE
- 06:46 CLE – AMEY, Otis 7 yd pass from PHILYAW, Raymon (BALL, Jason kick) – 53–42 CLE
- 03:40 GA – JONES, Tiger 8 yd pass from GREISEN, Chris (MARTINEZ, Carlo kick) – 53–49 CLE
- 02:17 CLE – REDD, Robert 6 yd pass from PHILYAW, Raymon (BALL, Jason kick) – 60–49 CLE

4th Quarter:

- 11:12 GA – HUEBNER, Matt 2 yd run (MARTINEZ, Carlo kick) – 60–56 CLE
- 07:38 CLE – MARSHALL, Willi 35 yd pass from PHILYAW, Raymon (BALL, Jason kick) – 67–56 CLE
- 05:09 GA – JONES, Tiger 19 yd pass from GREISEN, Chris (MARTINEZ, Carlo kick) – 67–63 CLE
- 01:43 CLE – REDD, Robert 8 yd pass from PHILYAW, Raymon (BALL, Jason kick failed) – 73–63 CLE
- 00:08 GA – BERGERON, Troy 2 yd pass from GREISEN, Chris (MARTINEZ, Carlo kick) – 73–70 CLE
- Officials: Referee: Bill LeMonnier; Umpire: Paul King; Linesman: Jullian Mapp; Line judge: Dirk Bell; Back judge: Tony Lombardo
- Offensive Player of the Game: Chris Greisen (GA)
- Defensive Player of the Game: Will Thompson (GA)
- Ironman Player of the Game: Willis Marshall (CLE)
