= Athol Springs, New York =

- Hamlet
- Location in New York Athol Springs (the United States)
- Coordinates: 42°46′11″N 78°51′59″W
- Country: United States
- State: New York
- County: Erie
- Town: Hamburg
- Elevation: 597 ft (182 m)
- Time zone: UTC-5 (Eastern (EST))
  - Summer (DST): UTC-4 (EDT)
- ZIP code: 14010
- Area code: 716
- GNIS feature ID: 942666

Athol Springs is a hamlet in the town of Hamburg in Erie County, New York, United States.

== Notable people ==
The family of feminist activist Katharine Martha Houghton Hepburn owned property in Athol Springs.

Athol Springs is the birthplace of retired National Football League quarterback Jim Kubiak.

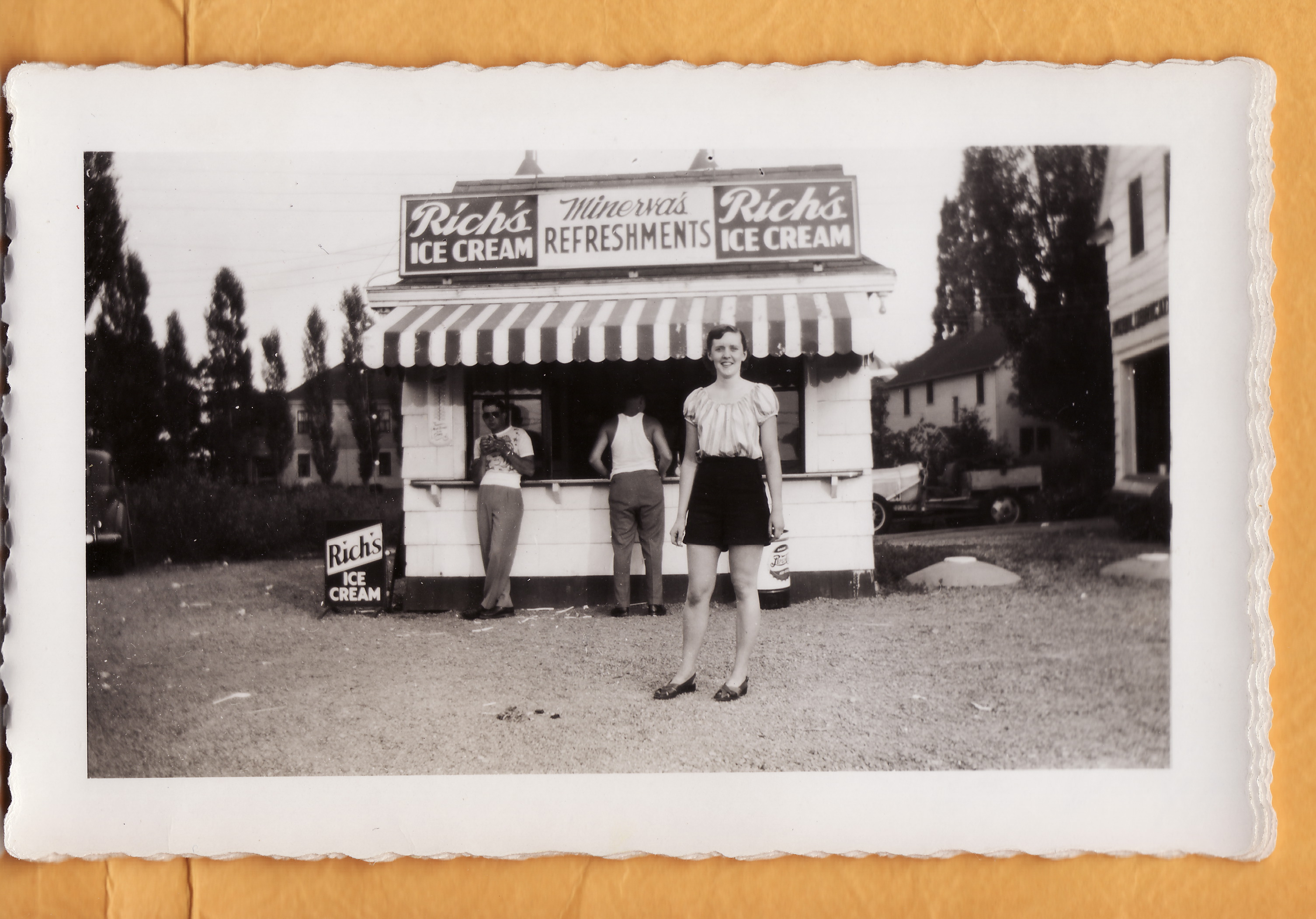
Minerva's Red Hots Athol Springs, NY

New York Giants head coach Brian Daboll graduated from Saint Francis High School.
