= 2016 New York Jets season =

2016 season of NFL team New York Jets

- Owner: Woody & Christopher Johnson
- General manager: Mike Maccagnan
- Head coach: Todd Bowles
- Home stadium: MetLife Stadium

Results
- Record: 5–11
- Division place: 4th AFC East
- Playoffs: Did not qualify
- Pro Bowlers: DE Leonard Williams

Uniform
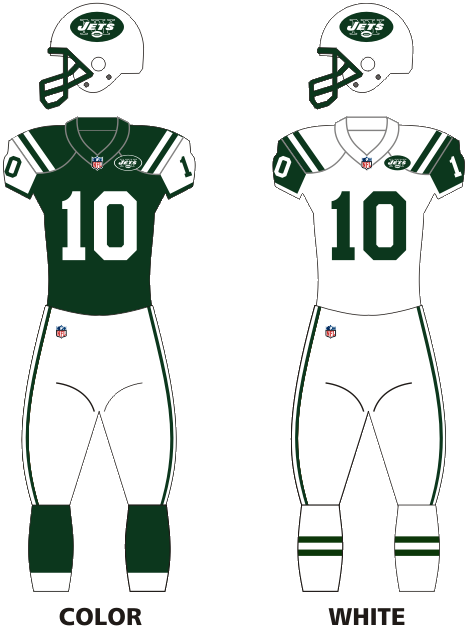

The 2016 season was the New York Jets' 47th in the National Football League (NFL), their 57th overall and their second under head coach Todd Bowles. The team failed to improve on their 10–6 record from 2015, and missed the playoffs for the sixth consecutive season, instead finishing 5–11 and last in their division.

== Transactions ==
=== Coaching staff and personnel changes ===
- Special teams coordinator Bobby April, special teams assistant coach Steve Hagen and assistant offensive line coach Ron Heller were fired on January 6, 2016.
- Brant Boyer was named the special teams coordinator on February 3, 2016.
- Jeff Hammerschmidt was named assistant special teams coach on February 5, 2016.
- David Diaz-Infante was named assistant offensive line coach, Tim Atkins was named defensive quality control coach and John Scott, Jr. was promoted to assistant defensive line coach on February 9, 2016.

=== Players ===
==== Arrivals ====
- The Jets signed Joseph Anderson, Deion Barnes, Brandon Bostick, Jarvis Harrison, Julian Howsare, Wes Saxton, Kevin Short, Deon Simon, Julian Stanford to reserve/future contracts on January 5, 2016.
- The Jets signed Kendall James to a reserve/future contract on January 7, 2016.
- The Jets signed Lawrence Okoye, Jesse Davis, Adrien Robinson, and Craig Watts to reserve/future contracts on January 11, 2016.
- The Jets signed Chandler Worthy to a reserve/future contract on January 12, 2016.
- The Jets signed Sean Hickey and Dominique Williams to reserve/future contracts on January 19, 2016.
- The Jets signed Titus Davis to a reserve/future contract on January 28, 2016.
- The Jets signed Dri Archer to a reserve/future contract on February 3, 2016.
- The Jets signed Kyle Brindza to a reserve/future contract on February 5, 2016.
- The Jets signed Freddie Bishop III on February 16, 2016.
- The Jets signed Matt Forte and Khiry Robinson on March 10, 2016.
- The Jets signed Steve McLendon on March 21, 2016.
- The Jets signed Darryl Morris on March 25, 2016.
- The Jets signed Jarvis Jenkins on March 30, 2016.
- The Jets signed Bruce Carter on April 4, 2016
- The Jets signed Jeremy Ross on April 8, 2016.
- The Jets signed Luke Marquardt on April 20, 2016.
- The Jets signed undrafted free agents Robby Anderson, Tarow Barney, Quenton Bundrage, Kyle Friend, Tom Hackett, Jalin Marshall, Ross Martin, Helva Matungulu, Doug Middleton, Julien Obioha, Claude Pelon, Lawrence Thomas and Jason Vander Laan on May 5, 2016.
- The Jets signed Bryson Keeton and claimed Jerome Cunningham off waivers on May 9, 2016.
- The Jets signed Romar Morris on May 24, 2016.
- The Jets signed Shelby Harris on June 1, 2016.
- The Jets signed Mike Liedtke on June 2, 2016.
- The Jets signed Kyle Williams on June 17, 2016.
- The Jets signed Bernard Pierce on July 27, 2016.
- The Jets signed Terry Williams on August 3, 2016.
- The Jets signed Matthew Tucker on August 4, 2016.
- The Jets claimed Chris King off waivers on August 6, 2016.
- The Jets signed Anthony Kelly and Christo Bilukidi on August 8, 2016.
- The Jets re-signed Julien Obioha and placed him on injured reserve on August 10, 2016.
- The Jets signed Lache Seastrunk on August 13, 2016.
- The Jets signed Terry Williams and Jake Ceresna on August 14, 2016.
- The Jets signed Antone Smith on August 16, 2016.
- The Jets claimed Braedon Bowman, Brian Parker, Troymaine Pope and Darryl Roberts off waivers on September 4, 2016.
- The Jets signed Antonio Allen on September 6, 2016.
- The Jets signed Braedon Bowman on September 23, 2016.

==== Departures ====
- The Jets waived Kyle Brindza on February 18, 2016.
- The Jets released Antonio Cromartie on February 22, 2016.
- The Jets released Jeremy Kerley and Jeff Cumberland on March 9, 2016.
- The Jets waived Sean Hickey on May 7, 2016.
- The Jets waived Adrien Robinson and Dri Archer on May 9, 2016.
- The Jets waived Jerome Cunningham on May 24, 2016.
- The Jets waived Lawrence Okoye on June 1, 2016.
- The Jets waived Luke Marquardt on June 2, 2016.
- The Jets waived Quenton Bundrage on June 17, 2016.
- The Jets waived Zac Stacy on July 27, 2016.
- The Jets waived Tom Hackett on July 28, 2016.
- The Jets waived/injured Kendall James on August 3, 2016.
- The Jets waived Terry Williams on August 4, 2016.
- Titus Davis left the team on August 6, 2016.
- The Jets waived/injured Julien Obioha and placed Chris King on the reserve/did not report list on August 8, 2016.
- The Jets waived/injured Matthew Tucker on August 13, 2016.
- The Jets waived Anthony Kelly and Christo Bilukidi left the team on August 14, 2016.
- The Jets placed Bernard Pierce on injured reserve on August 16, 2016. Pierce was released from the reserve list on August 20, 2016.
- The Jets released Deion Barnes, Jesse Davis, Kyle Friend, Shelby Harris, Jarvis Harrison, Ross Martin, Helva Matungulu, Lache Seastrunk, Jason Vander Laan, Kyle Williams and Terry Williams on August 28, 2016.
- The Jets waived/injured Dion Bailey, Jake Ceresna and Romar Morris on August 30, 2016.
- The Jets released Jeremy Ross and Antone Smith, waived/injured Trevor Reilly and waived Jace Amaro, Tarow Barney, Freddie Bishop III, Tommy Bohanon, Taiwan Jones, Bryson Keeton, Mike Liedtke, Doug Middleton, Dee Milliner, Darryl Morris, Claude Pelon, Wes Saxton, Kevin Short, Zach Sudfeld, Kenbrell Thompkins, Craig Watts and Chandler Worthy on September 3, 2016.
- The Jets waived Ronald Martin, Dexter McDougle and Dominique Williams and waived/injured Khiry Robinson on September 4, 2016.
- The Jets released Matthew Tucker and Trevor Reilly from their injured reserve list and waived Brian Parker from the active roster after he failed his physical on September 6, 2016.
- The Jets waived Braedon Bowman on September 13, 2016.
- The Jets waived Julian Howsare on September 22, 2016.

==== Trades ====
===== To Jets =====
- The Denver Broncos traded Ryan Clady and their seventh round selection in the 2016 NFL draft for the Jets' fifth round selection in the 2016 draft on April 10, 2016.

==== Practice squad ====
===== Arrivals =====
- The Jets signed Craig Watts, Claude Pelon, Myles White, Freddie Bishop III, Bryson Keeton and Doug Middleton on September 4, 2016.
- The Jets signed Dexter McDougle, Ronald Martin, Dominique Williams and Raheem Mostert on September 6, 2016.
- The Jets signed Victor Ochi and Wendall Williams on September 12, 2016.
- The Jets signed Braedon Bowman on September 19, 2016.
- The Jets signed Julian Howsare on September 24, 2016.

===== Departures =====
- The Jets waived Raheem Mostert and Myles White on September 12, 2016.
- The Jets waived Claude Pelon on September 19, 2016.

==== Free agents ====
Position	Player	Free agency tag	Date signed/released	2016 team*	Notes
S	Antonio Allen	UFA	March 16, 2016	Houston Texans	
DE	Stephen Bowen	UFA	June 1, 2016	Retired	
K	Randy Bullock	UFA	August 22, 2016	New York Giants	
G	Willie Colon	UFA	–	–	–
LB	Demario Davis	UFA	March 16, 2016	Cleveland Browns	
TE	Kellen Davis	UFA	March 14, 2016	New York Jets	
DE	Leger Douzable	UFA	June 13, 2016	Buffalo Bills	
QB	Ryan Fitzpatrick	UFA	July 28, 2016	New York Jets	
NT	Damon Harrison	UFA	March 9, 2016	New York Giants	
LB	Erin Henderson	UFA	March 24, 2016	New York Jets	
OT	Ben Ijalana	UFA	April 14, 2016	New York Jets	
RB	Chris Ivory	UFA	March 9, 2016	Jacksonville Jaguars	
S	Jaiquawn Jarrett	UFA	–	–	–
LB	Jamari Lattimore	UFA	May 31, 2016	Buffalo Bills	
WR	Chris Owusu	UFA	–	–	–
LB	Calvin Pace	UFA	–	–	–
RB	Bilal Powell	UFA	March 16, 2016	New York Jets	
P	Ryan Quigley	RFA	April 18, 2016	Philadelphia Eagles	
RB	Stevan Ridley	UFA	April 5, 2016	Detroit Lions	
TE	Zach Sudfeld	RFA	March 10, 2016	New York Jets	
WR	Kenbrell Thompkins	RFA	March 14, 2016	New York Jets	
CB	Darrin Walls	UFA	March 29, 2016	Detroit Lions	
DE	Muhammad Wilkerson	UFA/FT	July 15, 2016	New York Jets	

RFA: Restricted free agent, UFA: Unrestricted free agent, ERFA: Exclusive rights free agent, FT: Franchise tag. The * denotes that the "2016 team" is the team that signed a player first after departing the Jets. It does not take into account additional transactions that may occur through the season.

== Draft ==
2016 New York Jets Draft
Round	Selection	Player	Position	College	Notes
1	20	Darron Lee	OLB	Ohio State	
2	51	Christian Hackenberg	QB	Penn State	
3	83	Jordan Jenkins	OLB	Georgia	
4	118	Juston Burris	CB	N.C. State	
5	157	Traded to the Denver Broncos for Ryan Clady			
5	158	Brandon Shell	OT	South Carolina	From Washington Redskins
6	195	Traded to the Houston Texans for Ryan Fitzpatrick			
7	235	Lachlan Edwards	P	Sam Houston State	From the Denver Broncos
7	241	Charone Peake	WR	Clemson	

Notes

- The Jets traded their fifth-round selection to the Denver Broncos in exchange for Denver's seventh-round selection and offensive tackle Ryan Clady.
- The Jets traded their seventh-round selection to the Houston Texans in exchange for quarterback Ryan Fitzpatrick; the selection was upgraded to a sixth-rounder as a result of Fitzpatrick's playing time with the Jets in 2015.
- The Jets traded their 2017 fourth-round selection to the Washington Redskins in exchange for their 2016 fifth-round selection, which they used to select Brandon Shell.

== Preseason ==
=== Schedule ===
Week	Date	Opponent	Result	Record	Venue	Recap
1	August 11	Jacksonville Jaguars	W 17–13	1–0	MetLife Stadium	Recap
2	August 19	at Washington Redskins	L 18–22	1–1	FedExField	Recap
3	August 27	New York Giants	L 20–21	1–2	MetLife Stadium	Recap
4	September 1	at Philadelphia Eagles	L 6–14	1–3	Lincoln Financial Field	Recap

== Regular season ==
=== Schedule ===
Week	Date	Opponent	Result	Record	Venue	Recap
1	September 11	Cincinnati Bengals	**L** 22–23	0–1	MetLife Stadium	Recap
2	September 15	at **Buffalo Bills**	**W** 37–31	1–1	New Era Field	Recap
3	September 25	at Kansas City Chiefs	**L** 3–24	1–2	Arrowhead Stadium	Recap
4	October 2	Seattle Seahawks	**L** 17–27	1–3	MetLife Stadium	Recap
5	October 9	at Pittsburgh Steelers	**L** 13–31	1–4	Heinz Field	Recap
6	October 17	at Arizona Cardinals	**L** 3–28	1–5	University of Phoenix Stadium	Recap
7	October 23	Baltimore Ravens	**W** 24–16	2–5	MetLife Stadium	Recap
8	October 30	at Cleveland Browns	**W** 31–28	3–5	FirstEnergy Stadium	Recap
9	November 6	at **Miami Dolphins**	**L** 23–27	3–6	Hard Rock Stadium	Recap
10	November 13	Los Angeles Rams	**L** 6–9	3–7	MetLife Stadium	Recap
11	Bye					
12	November 27	**New England Patriots**	**L** 17–22	3–8	MetLife Stadium	Recap
13	December 5	Indianapolis Colts	**L** 10–41	3–9	MetLife Stadium	Recap
14	December 11	at San Francisco 49ers	**W** 23–17 (OT)	4–9	Levi's Stadium	Recap
15	December 17	**Miami Dolphins**	**L** 13–34	4–10	MetLife Stadium	Recap
16	December 24	at **New England Patriots**	**L** 3–41	4–11	Gillette Stadium	Recap
17	January 1	**Buffalo Bills**	**W** 30–10	5–11	MetLife Stadium	Recap

Note: Intra-division opponents are in bold text.

== Standings ==
=== Division ===
AFC East
	W	L	T	PCT	DIV	CONF	PF	PA	STK
^{(1)} New England Patriots	14	2	0	.875	5–1	11–1	441	250	W7
^{(6)} Miami Dolphins	10	6	0	.625	4–2	7–5	363	380	L1
Buffalo Bills	7	9	0	.438	1–5	4–8	399	378	L2
New York Jets	5	11	0	.313	2–4	4–8	275	409	W1

=== Conference ===
AFC
#	Team	Division	W	L	T	PCT	DIV	CONF	SOS	SOV	STK
Division leaders
1	New England Patriots	East	14	2	0	.875	5–1	11–1	.439	.424	W7
2 (Note: Kansas City clinched the AFC West division over Oakland based on head-to-head sweep.)	Kansas City Chiefs	West	12	4	0	.750	6–0	9–3	.508	.479	W2
3	Pittsburgh Steelers	North	11	5	0	.688	5–1	9–3	.494	.423	W7
4 (Note: Houston clinched the AFC South division title over Tennessee based on record vs. division opponents.)	Houston Texans	South	9	7	0	.563	5–1	7–5	.502	.427	L1
Wild Cards
5	Oakland Raiders	West	12	4	0	.750	3–3	9–3	.504	.443	L1
6	Miami Dolphins	East	10	6	0	.625	4–2	7–5	.455	.341	L1
Did not qualify for the postseason
7 (Note: Tennessee finished ahead of Denver based on head-to-head victory.)	Tennessee Titans	South	9	7	0	.563	2–4	6–6	.465	.458	W1
8	Denver Broncos	West	9	7	0	.563	2–4	6–6	.549	.455	W1
9 (Note: Baltimore finished ahead of Indianapolis based on record vs. conference opponents.)	Baltimore Ravens	North	8	8	0	.500	4–2	7–5	.498	.363	L2
10	Indianapolis Colts	South	8	8	0	.500	3–3	5–7	.492	.406	W1
11	Buffalo Bills	East	7	9	0	.438	1–5	4–8	.482	.339	L2
12	Cincinnati Bengals	North	6	9	1	.406	3–3	5–7	.521	.333	W1
13 (Note: The New York Jets finished ahead of San Diego based record vs. common opponents — the Jets' cumulative record against Cleveland, Indianapolis, Kansas City and Miami was 1–4, while San Diego's cumulative record against the same four teams was 0–5.)	New York Jets	East	5	11	0	.313	2–4	4–8	.518	.313	W1
14	San Diego Chargers	West	5	11	0	.313	1–5	4–8	.543	.513	L5
15	Jacksonville Jaguars	South	3	13	0	.188	2–4	2–10	.527	.417	L1
16	Cleveland Browns	North	1	15	0	.063	0–6	1–11	.549	.313	L1
Tiebreakers (Note: When breaking ties for three or more teams under the NFL's rules, they are first broken within divisions, then comparing only the highest ranked remaining team from each division.)

== Staff ==
2016 New York Jets staff
Front office: Chairman/CEO – Woody Johnson; President – Neil Glat; General manager – Mike Maccagnan; Director of football administration – Jacqueline Davidson; Director of player personnel – Brian Heimerdinger; Senior director of college scouting – Rex Hogan; Director of pro scouting – Matt Bazirgan; Head coaches: Head coach – Todd Bowles; Assistant head coach/inside linebackers – Mike Caldwell; Offensive coaches: Offensive coordinator – Chan Gailey; Quarterbacks – Kevin Patullo; Running backs – Marcel Shipp; Wide receivers – Karl Dorrell; Tight ends – Jimmie Johnson; Offensive line – Steve Marshall; Offensive line assistant – David Diaz-Infante; Offensive quality control – Robby Brown	Defensive coaches: Defensive coordinator – Kacy Rodgers; Defensive line – Pepper Johnson; Assistant defensive line – John Scott Jr.; Outside linebackers – Mark Collins; Defensive backs – Joe Danna; Assistant defensive backs – Daylon McCutcheon; Defensive quality control – Tim Atkins; Special teams coaches: Special teams coordinator – Brant Boyer; Special teams assistant – Jeff Hammerschmidt; Strength and conditioning: Head strength and conditioning – Justus Galac; Assistant strength and conditioning – Kavan Latham; Assistant strength and conditioning – Aaron McLaurin

== Final roster ==
2016 New York Jets roster
Quarterbacks (QB): 14 Ryan Fitzpatrick; 5 Christian Hackenberg; Running backs (RB): 26 Brandon Burks; 29 Bilal Powell; 34 Brandon Wilds; Wide receivers (WR): 11 Robby Anderson; 81 Quincy Enunwa; 15 Brandon Marshall; 89 Jalin Marshall; 17 Charone Peake; 19 Devin Smith; Tight ends (TE): 82 Brandon Bostick; 88 Austin Seferian-Jenkins; 83 Eric Tomlinson	Offensive linemen (OL): 77 James Carpenter G; 70 Dakota Dozier G/T; 69 Donald Hawkins T; 71 Ben Ijalana T; 76 Wesley Johnson C; 79 Brent Qvale T/G; 72 Brandon Shell T; 64 Craig Watts G; Defensive linemen (DL): 94 Brandin Bryant DE; 75 Anthony Johnson DE; 99 Steve McLendon DT; 91 Sheldon Richardson DT; 93 Deon Simon DT; 96 Muhammad Wilkerson DE; 92 Leonard Williams DE	Linebackers (LB): 56 Freddie Bishop OLB; 54 Bruce Carter MLB; 52 David Harris MLB; 48 Jordan Jenkins OLB; 49 Randell Johnson OLB; 50 Darron Lee OLB; 44 Corey Lemonier OLB; 95 Josh Martin OLB; 55 Lorenzo Mauldin OLB; Defensive backs (DB): 32 Juston Burris CB; 37 Bryson Keeton CB; 30 Nick Marshall CB; 42 Ronald Martin FS; 23 Dexter McDougle CB; 36 Doug Middleton SS; 45 Rontez Miles FS; 25 Calvin Pryor SS; 24 Darrelle Revis CB; 27 Darryl Roberts CB; 41 Buster Skrine CB; 20 Marcus Williams CB; Special teams (ST): 4 Lac Edwards P; 2 Nick Folk K; 46 Tanner Purdum LS	Practice squad: 62 Kenny Anunike DE; 63 Kyle Friend C; 18 Darius Jennings WR; 86 M. J. McFarland TE; 57 Victor Ochi OLB; 66 Claude Pelon DE; 31 Chris Swain FB; 85 Jason Vander Laan TE; 65 Martin Wallace T; Reserve: 39 Antonio Allen FS (IR); 84 Braedon Bowman TE (IR); 53 Mike Catapano OLB (IR); 78 Ryan Clady T (IR); 47 Kellen Davis TE (IR); 87 Eric Decker WR (IR); 22 Matt Forte RB (IR); 68 Breno Giacomini T (IR); 21 Marcus Gilchrist FS (IR); 58 Erin Henderson MLB (NF-Ill.); 74 Nick Mangold C (IR); -- Romar Morris RB (IR); -- Julien Obioha DE (IR); 9 Bryce Petty QB (IR); 33 Khiry Robinson RB (IR); 7 Geno Smith QB (IR); 51 Julian Stanford OLB (IR); 97 Lawrence Thomas DE (IR); 67 Brian Winters G (IR); Rookies in italics 53 active, 19 reserve, 9 practice squad

== Regular season results ==
=== Week 1: vs. Cincinnati Bengals ===
Week One: Cincinnati Bengals at New York Jets – Game summary

Quarter	1	2	3	4	Total
Bengals	3	10	7	3	23
Jets	7	9	0	6	22

at MetLife Stadium, East Rutherford, New Jersey

- Date: September 11
- Game time: 1:00 p.m. EDT
- Game weather: 79 °F (26 °C), clear
- Game attendance: 78,160
- Referee: Clete Blakeman
- TV announcers (CBS): Jim Nantz, Phil Simms and Tracy Wolfson
- Recap, Gamebook

Game information

First quarter

- NYJ – Quincy Enunwa 3-yard pass from Ryan Fitzpatrick (Nick Folk kick), 7:40. Jets 7–0. Drive: 10 plays, 78 yards, 4:49.
- CIN – Mike Nugent 33-yard field goal, 1:29. Jets 7–3. Drive: 6 plays, 65 yards, 2:13.

Second quarter

- CIN – A. J. Green 54-yard pass from Andy Dalton (Mike Nugent kick), 11:23. Bengals 10–7. Drive: 4 plays, 78 yards, 2:11.
- NYJ – Eric Decker 15-yard pass from Ryan Fitzpatrick (kick failed, wide right), 9:38. Jets 13–10. Drive: 5 plays, 39 yards, 1:45.
- NYJ – Nick Folk 45-yard field goal, 3:19. Jets 16–10. Drive: 9 plays, 28 yards, 4:42.
- CIN – Mike Nugent 21-yard field goal, 0:00. Jets 16–13. Drive: 12 plays, 82 yards, 3:19.

Third quarter

- CIN – Jeremy Hill 12-yard run (Mike Nugent kick), 3:09. Bengals 20–16. Drive: 9 plays, 92 yards, 4:09.

Fourth quarter

- NYJ – Nick Folk 20-yard field goal, 11:26. Bengals 20–19. Drive: 12 plays, 73 yards, 6:43.
- NYJ – Nick Folk 23-yard field goal, 3:23. Jets 22–20. Drive: 9 plays, 52 yards, 5:39.
- CIN – Mike Nugent 47-yard field goal, 0:54. Bengals 23–22. Drive: 9 plays, 55 yards, 2:29.

Top passers

- CIN – Andy Dalton – 23/30, 366 yards, TD, INT
- NYJ – Ryan Fitzpatrick – 19/35, 189 yards, 2 TD, INT

Top rushers

- CIN – Jeremy Hill – 9 rushes, 31 yards, TD
- NYJ – Matt Forte – 22 rushes, 96 yards

Top receivers

- CIN – A. J. Green – 12 receptions, 180 yards, TD
- NYJ – Matt Forte – 5 receptions, 59 yards

The Jets held a 22–20 lead going into the final minute, but Mike Nugent kicked the game-winning field goal for the Bengals with 54 seconds remaining. With the loss, the Jets started 0–1.

The loss ended the Jets' nine-game home winning streak against the Bengals, losing to them at home for the first time since the 1981 season.

=== Week 2: at Buffalo Bills ===
Week Two: New York Jets at Buffalo Bills – Game summary

Quarter	1	2	3	4	Total
Jets	6	14	7	10	37
Bills	7	3	14	7	31

at New Era Field, Orchard Park, New York

- Date: September 15
- Game time: 8:25 p.m. EDT
- Game weather: 60 °F (16 °C), partly cloudy
- Game attendance: 70,256
- Referee: Ed Hochuli
- TV announcers (CBS/NFLN/Twitter): Jim Nantz, Phil Simms and Tracy Wolfson
- Recap, Gamebook

Game information

First quarter

- NYJ – Nick Folk 28-yard field goal, 6:41. Jets 3–0. Drive: 15 plays, 65 yards, 8:19.
- BUF – Marquise Goodwin 84-yard pass from Tyrod Taylor (Dan Carpenter kick), 5:16. Bills 7–3. Drive: 3 plays, 82 yards, 1:25.
- NYJ – Nick Folk 29-yard field goal, 0:00. Bills 7–6. Drive: 9 plays, 75 yards, 5:16.

Second quarter

- NYJ – Matt Forte 1-yard run (Nick Folk kick), 11:07. Jets 13–7. Drive: 6 plays, 66 yards, 2:15.
- NYJ – Eric Decker 5-yard pass from Ryan Fitzpatrick (Nick Folk kick), 3:53. Jets 20–7. Drive: 7 plays, 77 yards, 3:54.
- BUF – Dan Carpenter 39-yard field goal, 0:05. Jets 20–10. Drive: 13 plays, 54 yards, 3:48.

Third quarter

- BUF – Greg Salas 71-yard pass from Tyrod Taylor (Dan Carpenter kick), 14:09. Jets 20–17. Drive: 3 plays, 75 yards, 0:51.
- BUF – Nickell Robey-Coleman 36-yard fumble return (Dan Carpenter kick), 11:15. Bills 24–20.
- NYJ – Matt Forte 3-yard run (Nick Folk kick), 2:12. Jets 27–24. Drive: 12 plays, 84 yards, 6:27.

Fourth quarter

- NYJ – Nick Folk 36-yard field goal, 10:40. Jets 30–24. Drive: 8 plays, 69 yards, 4:12.
- NYJ – Matt Forte 12-yard run (Nick Folk kick), 4:02. Jets 37–24. Drive: 5 plays, 56 yards, 3:01.
- BUF – Mike Gillislee 18-yard pass from Tyrod Taylor (Dan Carpenter kick), 1:17. Jets 37–31. Drive: 10 plays, 75 yards, 2:45.

Top passers

- NYJ – Ryan Fitzpatrick – 24/34, 374 yards, TD
- BUF – Tyrod Taylor – 18/30, 297 yards, 3 TD

Top rushers

- NYJ – Matt Forte – 30 rushes, 100 yards, 3 TD
- BUF – LeSean McCoy – 15 rushes, 59 yards

Top receivers

- NYJ – Eric Decker – 6 receptions, 126 yards, TD
- BUF – Marquise Goodwin – 2 receptions, 112 yards, TD

The Jets broke their five-game losing streak against the Bills as well as their losing streak on Thursday Night Football. The win was also the 400th career win in the franchise's history.

=== Week 3: at Kansas City Chiefs ===
Week Three: New York Jets at Kansas City Chiefs – Game summary

Quarter	1	2	3	4	Total
Jets	0	3	0	0	3
Chiefs	7	10	0	7	24

at Arrowhead Stadium, Kansas City, Missouri

- Date: September 25
- Game time: 4:25 p.m. EDT/3:25 p.m. CDT
- Game weather: 65 °F (18 °C), clear
- Game attendance: 71,587
- Referee: Bill Vinovich
- TV announcers (CBS): Greg Gumbel, Trent Green and Jamie Erdahl
- Recap, Gamebook

Game information

First quarter

- KC – Travis Kelce 12-yard pass from Alex Smith (Cairo Santos kick), 0:13. Chiefs 7–0. Drive: 4 plays, 35 yards, 2:11.

Second quarter

- KC – Cairo Santos 27-yard field goal, 6:11. Chiefs 10–0. Drive: 14 plays, 44 yards, 6:59.
- KC – Demetrius Harris 27-yard fumble return (Cairo Santos kick), 6:02. Chiefs 17–0.
- NYJ – Nick Folk 28-yard field goal, 2:06. Chiefs 17–3. Drive: 9 plays, 46 yards, 3:56.

Third quarter

- No scoring plays

Fourth quarter

- KC – Derrick Johnson 55-yard interception return (Cairo Santos kick), 3:28. Chiefs 24–3

Top passers

- NYJ – Ryan Fitzpatrick 20/44, 188 yards, 6 INT
- KC – Alex Smith 25/33, 237 yards, TD

Top rushers

- NYJ – Matt Forte 15 carries, 65 yards
- KC – Spencer Ware 20 carries, 75 yards

Top receivers

- NYJ – Bilal Powell 6 receptions, 41 yards
- KC – Travis Kelce 6 receptions, 89 yards, TD

Ryan Fitzpatrick threw a season high six interceptions in the loss. The Jets turned the ball over eight times as a team total. This was the first time the Jets turned it over 6+ times since 1976 against the Bengals.

=== Week 4: vs. Seattle Seahawks ===
Week Four: Seattle Seahawks at New York Jets – Game summary

Quarter	1	2	3	4	Total
Seahawks	0	14	3	10	27
Jets	3	7	0	7	17

at MetLife Stadium, East Rutherford, New Jersey

- Date: October 2
- Game time: 1:00 p.m. EDT
- Game weather: 61 °F (16 °C), cloudy
- Game attendance: 78,160
- Referee: Carl Cheffers
- TV announcers (Fox): Kevin Burkhardt, John Lynch and Pam Oliver
- Recap, Gamebook

Game information

First quarter

- NYJ – Nick Folk 34-yard field goal, 6:27. Jets 3–0. Drive: 14 plays, 62 yards, 8:33.

Second quarter

- SEA – C. J. Spiller 8-yard pass from Russell Wilson (Steven Hauschka kick), 11:34. Seahawks 7–3. Drive: 7 plays, 92 yards, 3:32.
- SEA – Tanner McEvoy 42-yard pass from Russell Wilson (Steven Hauschka kick), 3:44. Seahawks 14–3. Drive: 7 plays, 85 yards, 3:58.
- NYJ – Brandon Marshall 17-yard pass from Ryan Fitzpatrick (Nick Folk kick), 0:13. Seahawks 14–10. Drive: 10 plays, 75 yards, 3:31.

Third quarter

- SEA – Steven Hauschka 33-yard field goal, 4:13. Seahawks 17–10. Drive: 9 plays, 41 yards, 3:30.

Fourth quarter

- SEA – Christine Michael 6-yard pass from Russell Wilson (Steven Hauschka kick), 12:20. Seahawks 24–10. Drive: 4 plays, 61 yards, 2:07.
- SEA – Steven Hauschka 53-yard field goal, 4:04. Seahawks 27–10. Drive: 4 plays, −15 yards, 1:38.
- NYJ – Charone Peake 42-yard fumble recovery (Nick Folk kick), 2:15. Seahawks 27–17. Drive: 7 plays, 75 yards, 1:49.

Top passers

- SEA – Russell Wilson – 23/32, 309 yards, 3 TD
- NYJ – Ryan Fitzpatrick – 23/41, 261 yards, TD, 3 INT

Top rushers

- SEA – Christine Michael – 18 rushes, 58 yards
- NYJ – Matt Forte – 14 rushes, 27 yards

Top receivers

- SEA – Jimmy Graham – 6 receptions, 113 yards
- NYJ – Brandon Marshall – 4 receptions, 89 yards, TD

With the loss, the Jets fell to 1-3.

=== Week 5: at Pittsburgh Steelers ===
Week Five: New York Jets at Pittsburgh Steelers – Game summary

Quarter	1	2	3	4	Total
Jets	3	10	0	0	13
Steelers	7	7	3	14	31

at Heinz Field, Pittsburgh, Pennsylvania

- Date: October 9
- Game time: 1:00 p.m. EDT
- Game weather: 57 °F (14 °C), partly cloudy
- Game attendance: 66,385
- Referee: John Parry
- TV announcers (CBS): Ian Eagle, Dan Fouts and Evan Washburn
- Recap, Gamebook

Game information

First quarter

- NYJ – Nick Folk 35-yard field goal, 11:45. Jets 3–0. Drive: 8 plays, 58 yards, 3:15.
- PIT – Sammie Coates 72-yard pass from Ben Roethlisberger (Chris Boswell kick), 10:16. Steelers 7–3. Drive: 3 plays, 75 yards, 1:29.

Second quarter

- NYJ – Nick Folk 48-yard field goal, 11:07. Steelers 7–6. Drive: 9 plays, 59 yards, 4:40.
- NYJ – Brandon Marshall 15-yard pass from Ryan Fitzpatrick (Nick Folk kick), 2:06. Jets 13–7. Drive: 7 plays, 69 yards, 3:48.
- PIT – Jesse James 1-yard pass from Ben Roethlisberger (Chris Boswell kick), 0:41. Steelers 14–13. Drive: 11 plays, 75 yards, 1:25.

Third quarter

- PIT – Chris Boswell 47-yard field goal, 10:23. Steelers 17–13. Drive: 4 plays, 2 yards, 0:58.

Fourth quarter

- PIT – Antonio Brown 5-yard pass from Ben Roethlisberger (Chris Boswell kick), 14:55. Steelers 24–13. Drive: 9 plays, 80 yards, 4:12.
- PIT – Sammie Coates 5-yard pass from Ben Roethlisberger (Chris Boswell kick), 1:46. Steelers 31–13. Drive: 12 plays, 79 yards, 5:43.

Top passers

- NYJ – Ryan Fitzpatrick – 25/38, 255 yards, TD
- PIT – Ben Roethlisberger – 34/47, 380 yards, 4 TD

Top rushers

- NYJ – Matt Forte – 12 rushes, 53 yards
- PIT – Le'Veon Bell – 20 rushes, 66 yards

Top receivers

- NYJ – Brandon Marshall – 8 receptions, 114 yards, TD
- PIT – Sammie Coates – 6 receptions, 139 yards, 2 TD.

=== Week 6: at Arizona Cardinals ===
Week Six: New York Jets at Arizona Cardinals – Game summary

Quarter	1	2	3	4	Total
Jets	0	3	0	0	3
Cardinals	7	7	7	7	28

at University of Phoenix Stadium, Glendale, Arizona

- Date: October 17
- Game time: 8:30 p.m. EDT/5:30 p.m. Arizona time
- Game weather: Played indoors (retractable roof closed)
- Game attendance: 64,709
- Referee: Jerome Boger
- TV announcers (ESPN): Sean McDonough, Jon Gruden and Lisa Salters
- Recap, Gamebook

Game information

First quarter

- ARI – David Johnson 58-yard run (Chandler Catanzaro kick), 9:51. Cardinals 7–0. Drive: 1 play, 58 yards, 0:12.

Second quarter

- NYJ – Nick Folk 39-yard field goal, 12:06. Cardinals 7–3. Drive: 7 plays, 58 yards, 3:11.
- ARI – David Johnson 2-yard run (Chandler Catanzaro kick), 6:43. Cardinals 14–3. Drive: 11 plays, 75 yards, 5:23.

Third quarter

- ARI – David Johnson 2-yard run (Chandler Catanzaro kick), 5:24. Cardinals 21–3. Drive: 14 plays, 68 yards, 7:37.

Fourth quarter

- ARI – Michael Floyd 9-yard pass from Carson Palmer (Chandler Catanzaro kick), 8:20. Cardinals 28–3. Drive: 14 plays, 89 yards, 7:26.

Top passers

- NYJ – Ryan Fitzpatrick – 16/31, 174 yards, INT
- ARI – Carson Palmer – 23/34, 213 yards, TD

Top rushers

- NYJ – Matt Forte – 9 rushes, 19 yards
- ARI – David Johnson – 22 rushes, 111 yards, 3 TD

Top receivers

- NYJ – Brandon Marshall – 3 receptions, 70 yards
- ARI – John Brown – 5 receptions, 54 yards

Ryan Fitzpatrick was benched midway through the fourth quarter in favor of Geno Smith as the Jets fell to 1–5 on the season. This was the Jets' first loss to the Cardinals since 1975, when the Cardinals were based in St. Louis.

=== Week 7: vs. Baltimore Ravens ===
Week Seven: Baltimore Ravens at New York Jets – Game summary

Quarter	1	2	3	4	Total
Ravens	10	6	0	0	16
Jets	7	7	10	0	24

at MetLife Stadium, East Rutherford, New Jersey

- Date: October 23
- Game time: 1:00 p.m. EDT
- Game weather: 58 °F (14 °C), clear
- Game attendance: 78,160
- Referee: Walt Anderson
- TV announcers (CBS): Ian Eagle, Rich Gannon and Evan Washburn
- Recap, Gamebook

Game information

First quarter

- BAL – Chris Moore fumble recovery in the end zone (Justin Tucker kick), 9:37. Ravens 7–0.
- BAL – Justin Tucker 50-yard field goal, 4:27. Ravens 10–0. Drive: 5 plays, 59 yards, 2:03.
- NYJ – Quincy Enunwa 69-yard pass from Geno Smith (Nick Folk kick), 1:12. Ravens 10–7. Drive: 5 plays, 76 yards, 3:15.

Second quarter

- BAL – Justin Tucker 49-yard field goal, 11:57. Ravens 13–7. Drive: 11 plays, 44 yards, 4:15.
- NYJ – Matt Forte 13-yard pass from Ryan Fitzpatrick (Nick Folk kick), 1:45. Jets 14–13. Drive: 7 plays, 85 yards, 2:49.
- BAL – Justin Tucker 44-yard field goal, 0:00. Ravens 16–14. Drive: 8 plays, 50 yards, 1:45.

Third quarter

- NYJ – Nick Folk 22-yard field goal, 5:00. Jets 17–16. Drive: 4 plays, 1 yard, 2:03.
- NYJ – Matt Forte 1-yard run (Nick Folk kick), 0:56. Jets 24–16. Drive: 3 plays, 5 yards, 0:50.

Fourth quarter

- No scoring plays

Top passers

- BAL – Joe Flacco – 25/44, 248 yards, 2 INT
- NYJ – Ryan Fitzpatrick – 9/14, 120 yards, TD

Top rushers

- BAL – Terrance West – 8 rushes, 10 yards
- NYJ – Matt Forte – 30 rushes, 100 yards, TD

Top receivers

- BAL – Mike Wallace – 10 receptions, 120 yards
- NYJ – Quincy Enunwa – 2 receptions, 73 yards, TD

With the win, the Jets went to 2-5 and picked up their first home win of 2016.

=== Week 8: at Cleveland Browns ===
Week Eight: New York Jets at Cleveland Browns – Game summary

Quarter	1	2	3	4	Total
Jets	0	7	14	10	31
Browns	10	10	0	8	28

at FirstEnergy Stadium, Cleveland, Ohio

- Date: October 30
- Game time: 1:00 p.m. EDT
- Game weather: 53 °F (12 °C), rain
- Game attendance: 67,431
- Referee: Pete Morelli
- TV announcers (CBS): Kevin Harlan and Rich Gannon
- Recap, Gamebook

Game information

First quarter

- CLE – Andrew Hawkins 5-yard pass from Josh McCown (Cody Parkey kick), 11:45. Browns 7–0. Drive: 8 plays, 75 yards, 3:15.
- CLE – Cody Parkey 41-yard field goal, 3:11. Browns 10–0. Drive: 8 plays, 59 yards, 3:42.

Second quarter

- NYJ – Bilal Powell 35-yard run (Nick Folk kick), 12:44. Browns 10–7. Drive: 12 plays, 87 yards, 5:27.
- CLE – Isaiah Crowell 1-yard run (Cody Parkey kick), 1:51. Browns 17–7. Drive: 9 plays, 70 yards, 4:40
- CLE – Cody Parkey 27-yard field goal, 0:00. Browns 20–7. Drive: 6 plays, 49 yards, 1:25.

Third quarter

- NYJ – Quincy Enunwa 24-yard pass from Ryan Fitzpatrick (Nick Folk kick), 8:15. Browns 20–14. Drive: 12 plays, 78 yards, 6:45.
- NYJ – Matt Forte 4-yard run (Nick Folk kick), 2:11. Jets 21–20. Drive: 8 plays, 84 yards, 3:03.

Fourth quarter

- NYJ – Matt Forte 2-yard run (Nick Folk kick), 9:38. Jets 28–20. Drive: 13 plays, 81 yards, 6:27.
- NYJ – Nick Folk 24-yard field goal, 4:04. Jets 31–20. Drive: 4 plays, 2 yards, 1:09.
- CLE – Andrew Hawkins 1-yard pass from Josh McCown (Josh McCown–Terrelle Pryor pass), 0:12. Jets 31–28. Drive: 14 plays, 84 yards, 3:52.

Top passers

- NYJ – Ryan Fitzpatrick – 16/34, 228 yards, TD
- CLE – Josh McCown – 25/49, 341 yards, 2 TD, 2 INT

Top rushers

- NYJ – Matt Forte – 25 rushes, 82 yards, 2 TD
- CLE – Isaiah Crowell – 11 rushes, 29 yards, TD

Top receivers

- NYJ – Quincy Enunwa – 4 receptions, 93 yards, TD
- CLE – Terrelle Pryor – 6 receptions, 101 yards

With the comeback win, the Jets improved to 3-5.

=== Week 9: at Miami Dolphins ===
Week Nine: New York Jets at Miami Dolphins – Game summary

Quarter	1	2	3	4	Total
Jets	10	3	0	10	23
Dolphins	7	7	6	7	27

at Hard Rock Stadium, Miami Gardens, Florida

- Date: November 6
- Game time: 1:00 p.m. EST
- Game weather: 80 °F (27 °C), cloudy
- Game attendance: 65,722
- Referee: Walt Coleman
- TV announcers (CBS): Greg Gumbel, Trent Green and Jamie Erdahl
- Recap, Gamebook

Game information

First quarter

- NYJ – Nick Folk 23-yard field goal, 8:26. Jets 3–0. Drive: 13 plays, 70 yards, 6:34.
- MIA – Jay Ajayi 20-yard run (Andrew Franks kick), 4:56. Dolphins 7–3. Drive: 6 plays, 75 yards, 3:30.
- NYJ – Matt Forte 31-yard run (Nick Folk kick), 0:35. Jets 10–7. Drive: 7 plays, 75 yards, 4:21.

Second quarter

- MIA – Dominique Jones 1-yard pass from Ryan Tannehill (Andrew Franks kick), 10:16. Dolphins 14–10. Drive: 11 plays, 75 yards, 5:19.
- NYJ – Nick Folk 21-yard field goal, 5:20. Dolphins 14–13. Drive: 9 plays, 75 yards, 4:56.

Third quarter

- MIA – Andrew Franks 33-yard field goal, 5:08. Dolphins 17–13. Drive: 10 plays, 56 yards, 4:53.
- MIA – Andrew Franks 29-yard field goal, 3:22. Dolphins 20–13. Drive: 4 plays, 3 yards, 1:38.

Fourth quarter

- NYJ – Nick Folk 28-yard field goal, 12:50. Dolphins 20–16. Drive: 9 plays, 67 yards, 5:32.
- NYJ – Jalin Marshall 18-yard pass from Ryan Fitzpatrick (Nick Folk kick), 5:42. Jets 23–20. Drive: 2 plays, 18 yards, 0:10.
- MIA – Kenyan Drake 96-yard kickoff return (Andrew Franks kick), 5:15. Dolphins 27–23. Drive: 0 plays, 0 yards, 0:27.

Top passers

- NYJ – Ryan Fitzpatrick – 16/27, 194 yards, TD, 2 INT
- MIA – Ryan Tannehill – 17/28, 149 yards, TD

Top rushers

- NYJ – Matt Forte – 12 rushes, 92 yards, TD
- MIA – Jay Ajayi – 24 rushes, 111 yards, TD

Top receivers

- NYJ – Jalin Marshall – 3 receptions, 59 yards, TD
- MIA – Dominique Jones – 3 receptions, 42 yards, TD

With the loss, the Jets fell to 3-6 and lost at Miami for the first time since 2011.

=== Week 10: vs. Los Angeles Rams ===
Week Ten: Los Angeles Rams at New York Jets – Game summary

Quarter	1	2	3	4	Total
Rams	3	0	3	3	9
Jets	0	6	0	0	6

at MetLife Stadium, East Rutherford, New Jersey

- Date: November 13
- Game time: 1:00 p.m. EST
- Game weather: 62 °F (17 °C), sunny
- Game attendance: 78,160
- Referee: Ed Hochuli
- TV announcers (Fox): Thom Brennaman, Charles Davis and Peter Schrager
- Recap, Gamebook

Game information

First quarter

- LA – Greg Zuerlein 20-yard field goal, 9:37. Rams 3–0. Drive: 12 plays, 73 yards, 5:23.

Second quarter

- NYJ – Bilal Powell 4-yard pass play by Bryce Petty (kick failed, wide right), 12:35. Jets 6–3. Drive: 9 plays, 99 yards, 4:06.

Third quarter

- LA – Greg Zuerlein 38-yard field goal, 0:20. Tied 6–6. Drive: 15 plays, 55 yards, 8:15.

Fourth quarter

- LA – Greg Zuerlein 34-yard field goal, 6:52. Rams 9–6. Drive: 10 plays, 36 yards, 4:00.

Top passers

- LA – Case Keenum – 17/30, 165 yards
- NYJ – Bryce Petty – 19/32, 163 yards, TD, INT

Top rushers

- LA – Todd Gurley – 21 rushes, 64 yards
- NYJ – Matt Forte – 20 rushes, 98 yards

Top receivers

- LA – Kenny Britt – 7 receptions, 109 yards
- NYJ – Robby Anderson – 3 receptions, 69 yards

In a game that involved one touchdown (which was the Jets' only score, with the failed PAT) and 3 field goals (all by the Rams), the Jets fell to 3–7 in their first meeting with the Rams as a Los Angeles team since 1992.

=== Week 12: vs. New England Patriots ===
Week Twelve: New England Patriots at New York Jets – Game summary

Quarter	1	2	3	4	Total
Patriots	0	10	3	9	22
Jets	3	7	0	7	17

at MetLife Stadium, East Rutherford, New Jersey

- Date: November 27
- Game time: 4:25 p.m. EST
- Game weather: 45 °F (7 °C), partly cloudy
- Game attendance: 78,160
- Referee: Brad Allen
- TV announcers (CBS): Greg Gumbel, Trent Green and Jamie Erdahl
- Recap, Gamebook

Game information

First quarter

- NYJ – Nick Folk 51-yard field goal, 10:29. Jets 3–0. Drive: 8 plays, 41 yards, 3:14.

Second quarter

- NYJ – Brandon Marshall 1-yard pass from Ryan Fitzpatrick (Nick Folk kick), 14:56. Jets 10–0. Drive: 9 plays, 79 yards, 4:46.
- NE – Stephen Gostkowski 28-yard field goal, 10:45. Jets 10–3. Drive: 10 plays, 65 yards, 4:11.
- NE – Malcolm Mitchell 4-yard pass from Tom Brady (Stephen Gostkowski kick), 6:29. Tied 10–10. Drive: 7 plays, 50 yards, 3:17.

Third quarter

- NE – Stephen Gostkowski 29-yard field goal, 7:34. Patriots 13–10. Drive: 12 plays, 58 yard, 5:21.

Fourth quarter

- NYJ – Quincy Enunwa 22-yard pass from Ryan Fitzpatrick (Nick Folk kick), 10:11. Jets 17–13. Drive: 8 plays, 73 yards, 4:32.
- NE – Stephen Gostkowski 41-yard field goal, 7:02. Jets 17–16. Drive: 8 plays, 53 yards, 3:15.
- NE – Malcolm Mitchell 8-yard pass from Tom Brady (pass failed), 1:56. Patriots 22–17. Drive: 9 plays, 83 yards, 3:08.

Top passers

- NE – Tom Brady – 30/50, 286 yards, 2 TD
- NYJ – Ryan Fitzpatrick – 22/32, 269 yards, 2 TD

Top rushers

- NE – LeGarrette Blount – 11 rushes, 67 yards
- NYJ – Bilal Powell – 8 rushes, 36 yards

Top receivers

- NE – Julian Edelman – 8 receptions, 83 yards
- NYJ – Quincy Enunwa – 5 receptions, 109 yards, TD

With the heartbreaking loss, the Jets fell to 3-8.

=== Week 13: vs. Indianapolis Colts ===
Week Thirteen: Indianapolis Colts at New York Jets – Game summary

Quarter	1	2	3	4	Total
Colts	14	10	10	7	41
Jets	0	3	0	7	10

at MetLife Stadium, East Rutherford, New Jersey

- Date: December 5
- Game time: 8:30 p.m. EST
- Game weather: 45 °F (7 °C), clear
- Game attendance: 78,160
- Referee: Ronald Torbert
- TV announcers (ESPN): Sean McDonough, Jon Gruden and Lisa Salters
- Recap, Gamebook

Game information

First quarter

- IND – Dwayne Allen 7-yard pass from Andrew Luck (Adam Vinatieri kick), 10:23. Colts 7–0. Drive: 7 plays, 51 yards, 3:33.
- IND – Dwayne Allen 21-yard pass from Andrew Luck (Adam Vinatieri kick), 7:45. Colts 14–0. Drive: 4 plays, 69 yards, 1:47.

Second quarter

- NYJ – Nick Folk 38-yard field goal, 10:31. Colts 14–3. Drive: 10 plays, 77 yards, 4:29.
- IND – Adam Vinatieri 53-yard field goal, 8:16. Colts 17–3. Drive: 6 plays, 40 yards, 2:15.
- IND – Dwayne Allen 23-yard pass from Andrew Luck (Adam Vinatieri kick), 1:18. Colts 24–3. Drive: 9 plays, 70 yards, 5:20.

Third quarter

- IND – Donte Moncrief 3-yard pass from Andrew Luck (Adam Vinatieri kick), 8:54. Colts 31–3. Drive: 11 plays, 75 yards, 6:06.
- IND – Adam Vinatieri 36-yard field goal, 1:08. Colts 34–3. Drive: 10 plays, 43 yards, 5:11.

Fourth quarter

- IND – Robert Turbin 5-yard run (Adam Vinatieri kick), 14:54. Colts 41–3. Drive: 2 plays, 6 yards, 0:20.
- NYJ – Robby Anderson 40-yard pass from Bryce Petty (Nick Folk kick), 11:19. Colts 41–10. Drive: 11 plays, 75 yards, 3:35.

Top passers

- IND – Andrew Luck – 22/28, 278 yards, 4 TD
- NYJ – Bryce Petty – 11/25, 135 yards, TD, 2 INT

Top rushers

- IND – Frank Gore – 20 rushes, 79 yards
- NYJ – Matt Forte – 9 rushes, 25 yards

Top receivers

- IND – T. Y. Hilton – 9 receptions, 146 yards
- NYJ – Robby Anderson – 4 receptions, 61 yards, TD

With the huge loss, the Jets fell to 3–9, and were mathematically eliminated from postseason contention for the sixth consecutive season. It was the Jets' first loss to the Colts since the 2009 AFC Championship game.

=== Week 14: at San Francisco 49ers ===
Week Fourteen: New York Jets at San Francisco 49ers – Game summary

Quarter	1	2	3	4	OT	Total
Jets	0	3	3	11	6	23
49ers	14	3	0	0	0	17

at Levi's Stadium, Santa Clara, California

- Date: December 11
- Game time: 4:05 p.m. EST/1:05 p.m. PST
- Game weather: 54 °F (12 °C), mostly cloudy
- Game attendance: 70,178
- Referee: Craig Wrolstad
- TV announcers (CBS): Greg Gumbel, Trent Green and Jamie Erdahl
- Recap, Gamebook

Game information

First quarter

- SF – Carlos Hyde 7-yard pass from Colin Kaepernick (Phil Dawson kick), 13:57. 49ers 7–0. Drive: 1 play, 7 yards, 0:07.
- SF – Shaun Draughn 4-yard run (Phil Dawson kick), 10:45. 49ers 14–0. Drive: 4 plays, 81 yards, 1:49.

Second quarter

- NYJ – Nick Folk 36-yard field goal, 7:28. 49ers 14–3. Drive: 11 plays, 44 yards, 5:53.
- SF – Phil Dawson 47-yard field goal, 5:45. 49ers 17–3. Drive: 5 plays, 46 yards, 1:43.

Third quarter

- NYJ – Nick Folk 30-yard field goal, 6:28. 49ers 17–6. Drive: 13 plays, 64 yards, 7:25.

Fourth quarter

- NYJ – Bilal Powell 5-yard run (Bryce Petty run), 5:04. 49ers 17–14. Drive: 15 plays, 66 yards, 8:23.
- NYJ – Nick Folk 50-yard field goal, 0:38. Tied 17–17. Drive: 8 plays, 33 yards, 1:57.

Overtime

- NYJ – Bilal Powell 19-yard run, 8:35. Jets 23–17. Drive: 6 plays, 63 yards, 4:16.

Top passers

- NYJ – Bryce Petty – 23/35, 257 yards, INT
- SF – Colin Kaepernick – 15/26, 133 yards, TD

Top rushers

- NYJ – Bilal Powell – 29 rushes, 145 yards, 2 TD
- SF – Carlos Hyde – 17 rushes, 193 yards

Top receivers

- NYJ – Robby Anderson – 6 receptions, 99 yards
- SF – Jeremy Kerley – 5 receptions, 50 yards

With the win, the Jets improved to 4-9. They also improved to 3-10 all time against the 49ers.

=== Week 15: vs. Miami Dolphins ===
Week Fifteen: Miami Dolphins at New York Jets – Game summary

Quarter	1	2	3	4	Total
Dolphins	0	13	21	0	34
Jets	7	3	0	3	13

at MetLife Stadium, East Rutherford, New Jersey

- Date: December 17
- Game time: 8:25 p.m. EST
- Game weather: 35 °F (2 °C), cloudy
- Game attendance: 78,160
- Referee: Pete Morelli
- TV announcers (NFLN): Mike Tirico, Doug Flutie, Tony Dungy and Heather Cox
- Recap, Gamebook

Game information

First quarter

- NYJ – Robby Anderson 40-yard pass from Bryce Petty (Nick Folk kick), 11:32. Jets 7–0. Drive: 7 plays, 75 yards, 3:28.

Second quarter

- MIA – Dion Sims 1-yard pass from Matt Moore (kick failed, hit left upright), 10:57. Jets 7–6. Drive: 8 plays, 52 yards, 4:23.
- MIA – Kenny Stills 52-yard pass from Matt Moore (Andrew Franks kick), 1:58. Dolphins 13–7. Drive: 3 plays, 53 yards, 1:51.
- NYJ – Nick Folk 48-yard field goal, 0:18. Dolphins 13–10. Drive: 11 plays, 48 yards, 1:40.

Third quarter

- MIA – Walt Aikens 11-yard return of blocked punt (Andrew Franks kick), 10:30. Dolphins 20–10.
- MIA – Dion Sims 1-yard pass from Matt Moore (Andrew Franks kick), 7:43. Dolphins 27–10. Drive: 5 plays, 60 yards, 2:32.
- MIA – Jarvis Landry 66-yard pass from Matt Moore (Andrew Franks kick), 6:26. Dolphins 34–10. Drive: 1 play, 66 yards, 0:10.

Fourth quarter

- NYJ – Nick Folk 36-yard field goal, 5:43. Dolphins 34–13. Drive: 9 plays, 37 yards, 4:08.

Top passers

- MIA – Matt Moore – 12/18, 236 yards, 4 TD, INT
- NYJ – Bryce Petty – 20/36, 235 yards, TD, 2 INT

Top rushers

- MIA – Jay Ajayi – 19 rushes, 51 yards
- NYJ – Bilal Powell – 16 rushes, 84 yards

Top receivers

- MIA – Jarvis Landry – 3 receptions, 108 yards, TD
- NYJ – Robby Anderson – 4 receptions, 80 yards, TD

With the loss, the Jets fell to 4–10 and were swept by the Dolphins for the first time since 2009.

=== Week 16: at New England Patriots ===
Week Sixteen: New York Jets at New England Patriots – Game summary

Quarter	1	2	3	4	Total
Jets	0	0	0	3	3
Patriots	10	17	7	7	41

at Gillette Stadium, Foxborough, Massachusetts

- Date: December 24
- Game time: 1:00 p.m. EST
- Game weather: 40 °F (4 °C), rain
- Game attendance: 66,289
- Referee: Gene Steratore
- TV announcers (CBS): Ian Eagle, Dan Fouts and Evan Washburn
- Recap, Gamebook

Game information

First quarter

- NE – Stephen Gostkowski 29-yard field goal, 8:16. Patriots 3–0. Drive: 9 plays, 42 yards, 4:31.
- NE – Martellus Bennett 8-yard pass from Tom Brady (Stephen Gostkowski kick), 3:02. Patriots 10–0. Drive: 8 plays, 47 yards, 4:17.

Second quarter

- NE – Stephen Gostkowski 22-yard field goal, 11:13. Patriots 13–0. Drive: 8 plays, 24 yards, 2:42.
- NE – Matt Lengel 18-yard pass from Tom Brady (Stephen Gostkowski kick), 2:40. Patriots 20–0. Drive: 4 plays, 54 yards, 2:07.
- NE – James White 25-yard pass from Tom Brady (Stephen Gostkowski kick), 0:25. Patriots 27–0. Drive: 4 plays, 87 yards, 1:05.

Third quarter

- NE – LeGarrette Blount 1-yard run (Stephen Gostkowski kick), 3:22. Patriots 34–0. Drive: 13 plays, 63 yards, 7:40.

Fourth quarter

- NE – LeGarrette Blount 1-yard run (Stephen Gostkowski kick), 12:24. Patriots 41–0. Drive: 8 plays, 22 yards, 3:03.
- NYJ – Nick Folk 29-yard field goal, 6:16. Patriots 41–3. Drive: 13 plays, 64 yards, 6:08.

Top passers

- NYJ – Ryan Fitzpatrick – 8/21, 136 yards, 2 INT
- NE – Tom Brady – 17/27, 214 yards, 3 TD

Top rushers

- NYJ – Bilal Powell – 15 rushes, 60 yards
- NE – Dion Lewis – 16 rushes, 52 yards

Top receivers

- NYJ – Quincy Enunwa – 1 reception, 30 yards
- NE – Julian Edelman – 5 reception, 89 yards

With the loss, the Jets fell to 4–11. They were also given their worst defeat since losing 49–9 to Cincinnati in 2013 and their worst loss to the Patriots since 2012. This also marked the first time they were swept New England in 2 years.

=== Week 17: vs. Buffalo Bills ===
Week Seventeen: Buffalo Bills at New York Jets – Game summary

Quarter	1	2	3	4	Total
Bills	0	3	0	7	10
Jets	0	10	10	10	30

at MetLife Stadium, East Rutherford, New Jersey

- Date: January 1, 2017
- Game time: 1:00 p.m. EST
- Game weather: 42 °F (6 °C), sunny
- Game attendance: 78,160
- Referee: Jeff Triplette
- TV announcers (CBS): Andrew Catalon, Steve Beuerlein and Steve Tasker
- Recap, Gamebook

Game information

First quarter

- No scoring plays

Second quarter

- NYJ – Bilal Powell 2-yard pass from Ryan Fitzpatrick (Nick Folk kick), 9:28. Jets 7–0. Drive: 7 plays, 75 yards, 4:34.
- BUF – Dan Carpenter 34-yard field goal, 1:45. Jets 7–3. Drive: 11 plays, 54 yards, 4:12.
- NYJ – Nick Folk 30-yard field goal, 0:00. Jets 10–3. Drive: 10 plays, 63 yards, 1:45.

Third quarter

- NYJ – Jalin Marshall 6-yard pass from Ryan Fitzpatrick (Nick Folk kick), 4:03. Jets 17–3. Drive: 3 plays, 13 yards, 1:28.
- NYJ – Nick Folk 36-yard field goal, 0:01. Jets 20–3. Drive: 5 plays, 14 yards, 2:35.

Fourth quarter

- NYJ – Nick Folk 25-yard field goal, 3:21. Jets 23–3. Drive: 4 plays, −4 yards, 1:42.
- NYJ – Doug Middleton kickoff recovery in the end zone (Nick Folk kick), 3:21. Jets 30–3. Drive: 0 plays, 0 yards, 0:00.
- BUF – Mike Gillislee 1-yard run (Dan Carpenter kick), 0:39. Jets 30–10. Drive: 5 plays, 71 yards, 2:42.

Top passers

- BUF – Cardale Jones – 6/11, 96 yards, INT
- NYJ – Ryan Fitzpatrick – 20/30, 210 yards, 2 TD

Top rushers

- BUF – Mike Gillislee – 15 rushes, 40 yards, TD
- NYJ – Bilal Powell – 22 rushes, 122 yards

Top receivers

- BUF – Justin Hunter – 1 reception, 64 yards
- NYJ – Quincy Enunwa – 5 receptions, 81 yards

With the win, the Jets finished their season at 5-11, and swept Buffalo for the first time since 2011.

In the fourth quarter, the Bills botched a kickoff return, which resulted in a unique touchdown for the Jets when special teamer Doug Middleton recovered the live kick in the Bills' end zone.
