= 2016 Senior Bowl =

2016 Reese's Senior Bowl
- 67th Senior Bowl
North Team	South Team
16	27
Head coach: Jason Garrett (Dallas Cowboys)	Head coach: Gus Bradley (Jacksonville Jaguars)
	1	2	3	4	Total
North	0	3	7	6	16
South	10	7	3	7	27
- Date: January 30, 2016
- Season: 2015
- Stadium: Ladd–Peebles Stadium
- Location: Mobile, Alabama
- MVP: Dak Prescott
- Referee: Tracy Jones
- Attendance: 35,271

United States TV coverage
- Network: NFL Network

The 2016 Senior Bowl was an all-star college football exhibition game featuring players from the 2015 NCAA Division I FBS football season, and prospects for the 2016 draft of the professional National Football League (NFL). The game concluded the post-season that began on December 19, 2015. It was sponsored by Reese's Peanut Butter Cups and is officially known as the Reese's Senior Bowl.

The game was played on January 30, 2016, at 1:30 p.m. CST, at Ladd–Peebles Stadium in Mobile, Alabama, between "North" and "South" teams. Coverage of the event was provided on the NFL Network.

== Rosters ==
=== North Team ===
No.	Name	Position	HT/WT	School
1	Braxton Miller	WR	6'2"/215	Ohio State
4	Darian Thompson	S	6'2"/212	Boise State
6	Cody Kessler	QB	6'1"/215	USC
7	Tyler Ervin	RB	5'10"/177	San Jose State
8	Kevin Hogan	QB	6'4"/218	Stanford
11	Carson Wentz	QB	6'6"/235	North Dakota State
15	Kaʻimi Fairbairn	K	6'0"/190	UCLA
16	Jeff Driskel	QB	6'4"/234	Louisiana Tech
17	Jihad Ward	DE	6'6"/295	Illinois
19	Jordan Payton	WR	6'1"/212	UCLA
20	Deiondre' Hall	CB	6'2"/190	Northern Iowa
21	Tavon Young	CB	5'10"/181	Temple
22	Riley Dixon	P	6'5"/219	Syracuse
23	Tyvis Powell	S	6'3"/210	Ohio State
24	Kevin Peterson	CB	5'11"/190	Oklahoma State
25	Miles Killebrew	S	6'3"/230	Southern Utah
26	Maurice Canady	CB	6'2"/195	Virginia
27	Chris Swain	RB	6'1"/245	Navy
28	Kenneth Dixon	RB	5'10"/212	Louisiana Tech
29	K. J. Dillon	S	6'1"/203	West Virginia
31	Eric Murray	CB	6'0"/199	Minnesota
33	Soma Vainuku	FB	6'0"/255	USC
35	Nick Kwiatkoski	ILB	6'2"/235	West Virginia
37	Joshua Perry	OLB	6'4"/254	Ohio State
41	Jared Norris	ILB	6'2"/240	Utah
44	Blake Martinez	ILB	6'2"/245	Stanford
48	Tyler Matakevich	ILB	6'1"/235	Temple
49	Kyler Fackrell	OLB	6'5"/250	Utah State

No.	Name	Position	HT/WT	School
51	Josh Garnett	OG	6'5"/321	Stanford
56	Joe Dahl	OG	6'5"/310	Washington State
58	Joe Schobert	OLB	6'2"/236	Wisconsin
59	Joe Haeg	OT	6'6"/310	North Dakota State
60	Jeff Overbaugh	LS	6'2"/240	San Diego State
63	Austin Blythe	C	6'3"/290	Iowa
66	Jack Allen	C	6'2"/296	Michigan State
70	Willie Beavers	OG	6'5"/309	Western Michigan
71	Jason Fanaika	DE	6'3"/270	Utah
72	Nick Martin	OG	6'5"/301	Notre Dame
77	Kyle Murphy	OT	6'7"/301	Stanford
78	Jason Spriggs	OT	6'7"/305	Indiana
79	Cole Toner	OT	6'6"/303	Harvard
80	Bryce Williams	TE	6'6"/258	East Carolina
81	Nick Vannett	TE	6'6"/260	Ohio State
82	Henry Krieger-Coble	TE	6'4"/250	Iowa
84	Leonte Carroo	WR	6'1"/215	Rutgers
85	Chris Moore	WR	6'2"/190	Cincinnati
88	Tajae Sharpe	WR	6'3"/188	UMass
90	Matt Ioannidis	DT	6'4"/292	Temple
91	Sheldon Day	DT	6'2"/285	Notre Dame
92	Adolphus Washington	DT	6'4"/290	Ohio State
93	Vernon Butler	DT	6'3"/309	Louisiana Tech
95	Carl Nassib	DE	6'7"/272	Penn State
98	Lawrence Thomas	DE	6'4"/305	Michigan State
99	Austin Johnson	DT	6'4"/325	Penn State

=== South Team ===
No.	Name	Position	HT/WT	School
0	Deion Jones	ILB	6'1"/227	LSU
1	Harlan Miller	CB	6'1"/180	SE Louisiana
3	Sterling Shepard	WR	5'10"/191	Oklahoma
4	Jay Lee	WR	6'3"/215	Baylor
5	Cyrus Jones	CB	5'10"/196	Alabama
9	Charone Peake	WR	6'2"/205	Clemson
10	Brandon Allen	QB	6'2"/210	Arkansas
12	Jacoby Brissett	QB	6'4"/231	NC State
14	Jake Coker	QB	6'5"/232	Alabama
15	Dak Prescott	QB	6'2"/230	Mississippi State
16	Jeremy Cash	S	6'2"/210	Duke
17	Kenyan Drake	RB	6'1"/210	Alabama
19	Reggie Ragland	OLB	6'2"/252	Alabama
20	Kevin Byard	S	5'11"/217	Middle Tennessee
21	Sean Davis	S	6'1"/202	Maryland
22	Aaron Green	RB	5'11"/205	TCU
23	Jonathan Jones	CB	5'10"/181	Auburn
25	James Bradberry	CB	6'1"/213	Samford
28	Jalen Mills	CB	6'1"/194	LSU
31	DeAndré Washington	RB	5'8"/200	Texas Tech
32	Jonathan Williams	RB	6'0"/223	Arkansas
33	Antonio Morrison	ILB	6'1"/230	Florida
35	Ross Martin	K	5'10"/185	Duke
36	DeAndre Houston-Carson	S	6'2"/195	William & Mary
38	Alex Kinal	P	6'4"/205	Wake Forest
40	Dan Vitale	FB	6'2"/235	Northwestern
45	Josh Forrest	ILB	6'2"/250	Kentucky
48	Glenn Gronkowski	TE	6'3"/234	Kansas State

No.	Name	Position	HT/WT	School
49	Eric Striker	OLB	6'0"/223	Oklahoma
50	Jimmy Landes	LS	6'2"/250	Baylor
55	Cody Whitehair	OG	6'4"/305	Kansas State
58	Spencer Drango	OT	6'6"/310	Baylor
59	Jordan Jenkins	OLB	6'3"/253	Georgia
60	Connor McGovern	OG	6'4"/300	Missouri
61	Graham Glasgow	C	6'6"/303	Michigan
62	Le'Raven Clark	OT	6'6"/307	Texas Tech
65	Christian Westerman	OG	6'4"/300	Arizona State
71	John Theus	OT	6'6"/303	Georgia
73	Sebastian Tretola	OG	6'4"/330	Arkansas
74	Vadal Alexander	OT	6'6"/329	LSU
77	Evan Boehm	C	6'3"/320	Missouri
81	K. J. Maye	WR	5'10"/194	Minnesota
83	Jake McGee	TE	6'6"/250	Florida
86	Malcolm Mitchell	WR	6'1"/196	Georgia
88	Paul McRoberts	WR	6'3"/197	SE Missouri State
89	Jerell Adams	TE	6'6"/231	South Carolina
90	Jarran Reed	DT	6'4"/313	Alabama
91	Charles Tapper	DT	6'4"/283	Oklahoma
92	Shawn Oakman	DE	6'9"/275	Baylor
95	Bronson Kaufusi	DE	6'7"/265	Brigham Young
96	Dadi Nicolas	DE	6'3"/227	Virginia Tech
97	Noah Spence	DE	6'3"/261	Eastern Kentucky
98	Sheldon Rankins	DT	6'2"/303	Louisville
99	Quinton Jefferson	DT	6'3"/289	Maryland

== Game summary ==
=== Scoring summary ===
Scoring Play	Score
1st Quarter
SOUTH – Aaron Green 25–yard run (Ross Martin kick), 04:00	SOUTH 7 – 0
SOUTH – Ross Martin 48–yard field goal, 00:20	SOUTH 10 – 0
2nd Quarter
NORTH – Kaʻimi Fairbairn 36–yard field goal, 02:56	SOUTH 10 – 3
SOUTH – Paul McRoberts 5–yard pass from Dak Prescott (Ross Martin kick), 00:22	SOUTH 17 – 3
3rd Quarter
SOUTH – Ross Martin 40–yard field goal, 09:26	SOUTH 20 – 3
NORTH – Cody Kessler 1–yard run (Kaʻimi Fairbairn kick), 01:53	SOUTH 20 – 10
4th Quarter
SOUTH – Kenyan Drake 1–yard run (Ross Martin kick), 06:28	SOUTH 27 – 10
NORTH – Aaron Burbridge 29–yard pass from Jeff Driskel (PAT not attempted), 00:00	SOUTH 27 – 16

=== Statistics ===
Statistics	North	South
First downs	18	21
Total offense, plays - yards	332	353
Rushes-yards (net)	26–112	27–127
Passing yards (net)	220	226
Passes, Comp-Att-Int	21–36–0	22–34–0
Time of Possession	28:17	31:43
