= Tim Atkins =

Tim Atkins may refer to:

- Tim Atkins (field hockey)
- Tim Atkins (American football)
