= Thomas Hennessy (American football) =

American football player (born 1994)

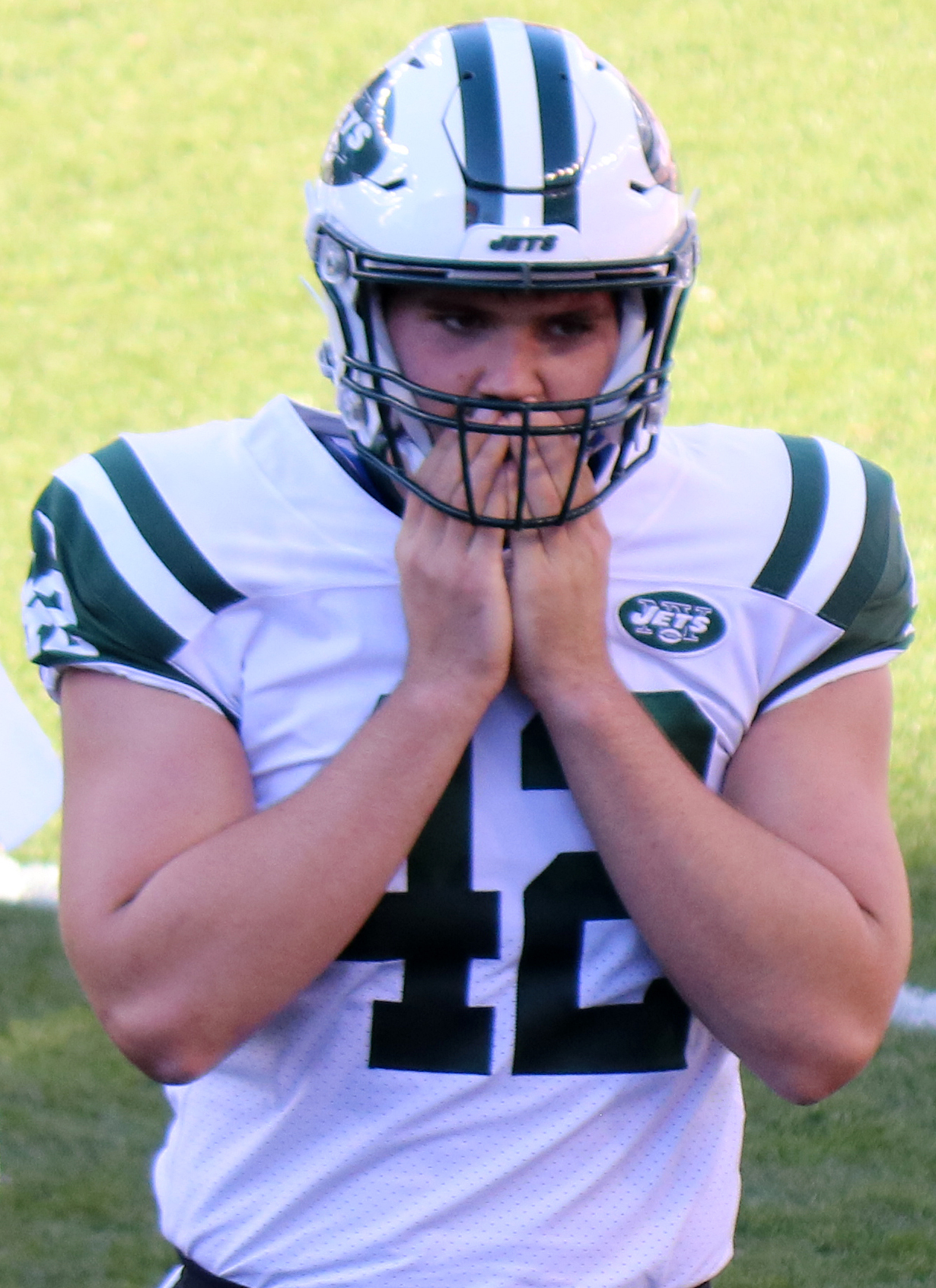
- Hennessy with the New York Jets in 2017

No. 42 – New York Jets
- Position: Long snapper
- Roster status: Active

Personal information
- Born: June 11, 1994 (age 32); Virginia Beach, Virginia, U.S.
- Listed height: 6 ft 2 in (1.88 m)
- Listed weight: 246 lb (112 kg)

Career information
- High school: Don Bosco Prep (Ramsey, New Jersey)
- College: Duke (2012–2016)
- NFL draft: 2017: undrafted

Career history
- Indianapolis Colts (2017)*; New York Jets (2017–present)
- * Offseason or practice squad member only

Career NFL statistics as of Week 8, 2026
- Games played: 157
- Total tackles: 30
- Forced fumbles: 1
- Stats at Pro Football Reference

Thomas Hennessy (born June 11, 1994) is an American professional football long snapper for the New York Jets of the National Football League (NFL). He played college football for the Duke Blue Devils. He has also been a member of the Indianapolis Colts.

== Early life ==
Hennessy played high school football at Don Bosco Preparatory High School in Ramsey, New Jersey, where he was a three-year letterman. He helped the team to a three-year record of 35–0. The school also won three state championships and were named national champions by USA Today in 2009 and 2011. In the class of 2012, he was rated the ninth best long snapper in the country by Kohl's.

== College career ==
Hennessy played for the Duke Blue Devils of Duke University from 2013 to 2016. He was redshirted in 2012. He started all 14 games in 2013 and played 149 total snaps. Hennessy also recorded one solo tackle. He started all 13 games in 2014 and played 133 total snaps. He also recorded one solo tackle and one tackle assist. Hennessy started all 13 games in 2015 and played 144 total snaps. He started all 12 games in 2016 and played 119 total snaps. He also recorded one solo tackle. He played in 52 games, all starts, during his college career and played 545 total snaps. He also recorded three solo tackles and one tackle assist. Hennessy majored in biology and minored in psychology at Duke.

== Professional career ==
=== Pre-draft ===
Hennessy was rated the 19th long snapper in the 2017 NFL draft by NFLDraftScout.com.

Pre-draft measurables
Height	Weight	Arm length	Hand span	Wingspan	40-yard dash	10-yard split	20-yard split	20-yard shuttle	Three-cone drill	Vertical jump	Broad jump	Bench press
6 ft 3 1/4 in (1.91 m)	246 lb (112 kg)	31 1/2 in (0.80 m)	9 3/8 in (0.24 m)	6 ft 7 1/4 in (2.01 m)	5.04 s	1.74 s	2.89 s	4.43 s	7.48 s	29.5 in (0.75 m)	8 ft 9 in (2.67 m)	15 reps
All values from Duke Pro Day

=== Indianapolis Colts ===
After going undrafted, Hennessy signed with the Indianapolis Colts on May 4, 2017.

=== New York Jets ===
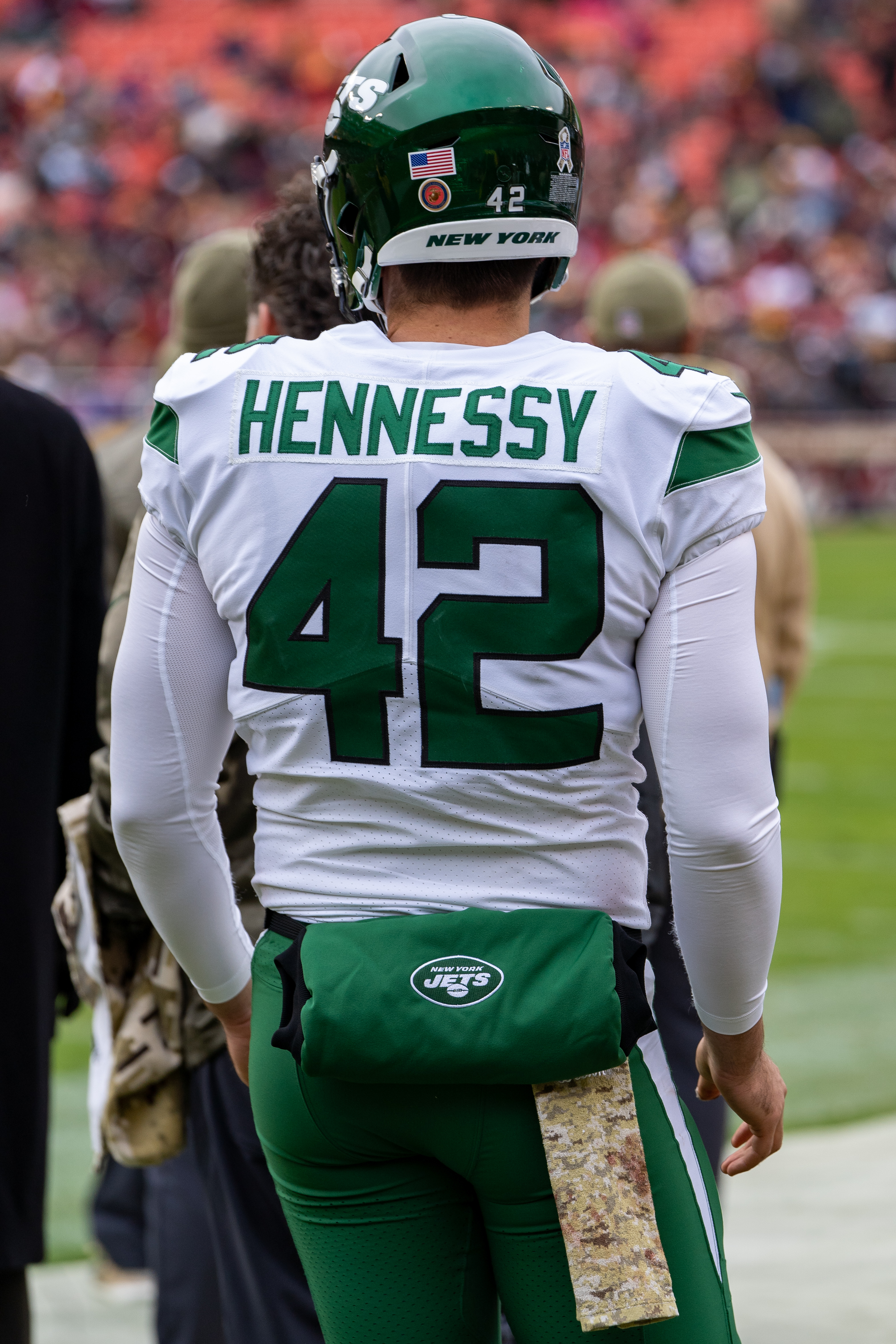
Hennessy with the Jets in 2019

On August 28, 2017, Hennessy was traded to the New York Jets for safety Ronald Martin.

On October 5, 2019, Hennessy signed a four-year contract extension with the Jets.

On April 28, 2023, Hennessy signed a four-year contract extension with the Jets.

== Personal life ==
Thomas Hennessy grew up in Bardonia, New York. His brother, Matthew Hennessy, is also an NFL player. Thomas and his brother grew up as New York Giants fans. In 2019, he married former Duke volleyball player, Christina Vucich Hennessy.
