= Joe Schobert =

American football player (born 1993)

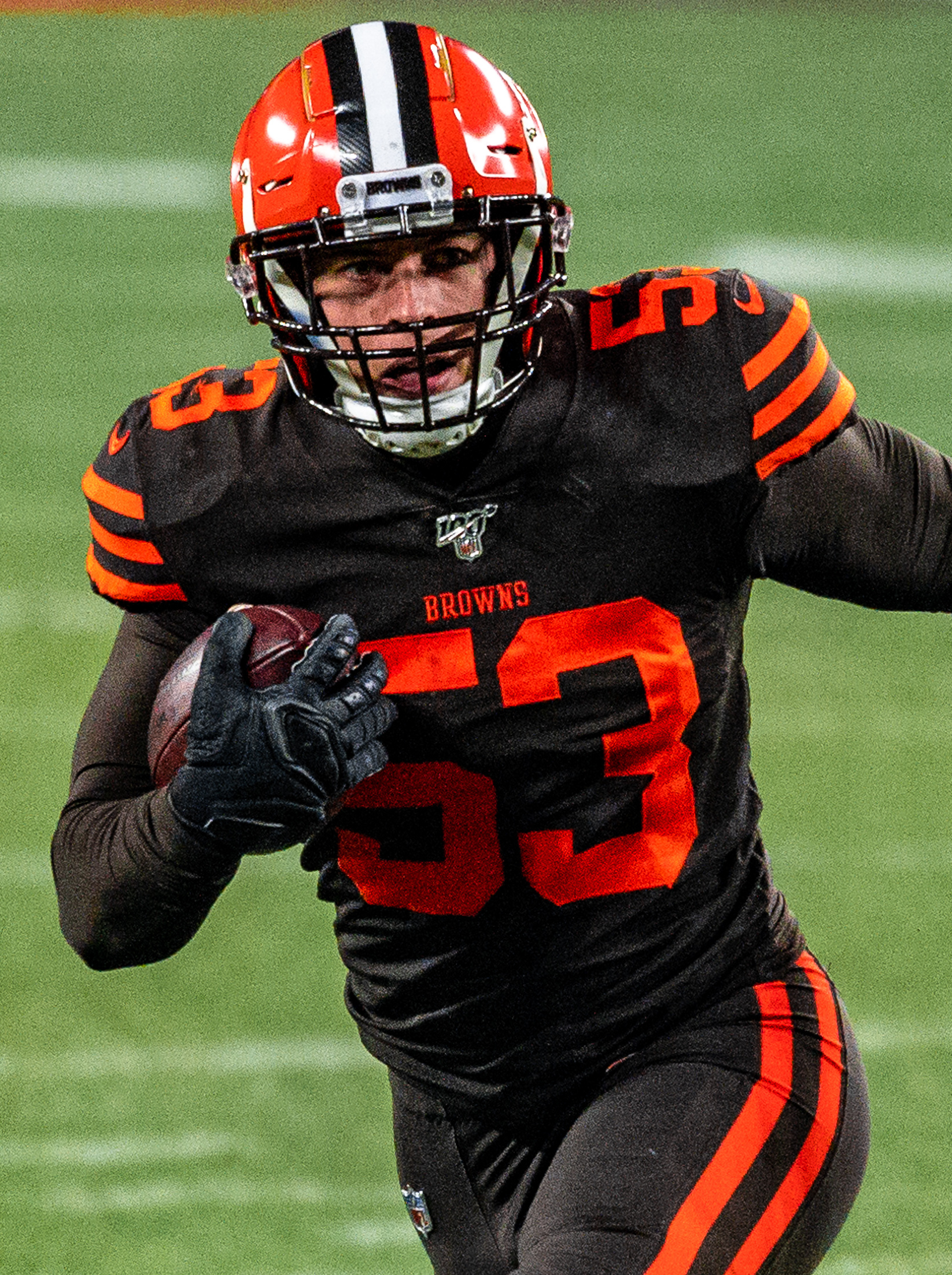
- Schobert with the Cleveland Browns in 2019

No. 53, 47, 45, 93, 52
- Position: Linebacker

Personal information
- Born: November 6, 1993 (age 33); Waukesha, Wisconsin, U.S.
- Listed height: 6 ft 1 in (1.85 m)
- Listed weight: 240 lb (109 kg)

Career information
- High school: Waukesha West
- College: Wisconsin (2012–2015)
- NFL draft: 2016: 4th round, 99th overall pick

Career history
- Cleveland Browns (2016–2019); Jacksonville Jaguars (2020); Pittsburgh Steelers (2021); Denver Broncos (2022)*; Tennessee Titans (2022)
- * Offseason or practice squad member only

Awards and highlights
- Pro Bowl (2017); NFL combined tackles co-leader (2017); Jack Lambert Trophy (2015); First-team All-American (2015); Big Ten Linebacker of the Year (2015); First-team All-Big Ten (2015)

Career NFL statistics
- Total tackles: 677
- Sacks: 11
- Forced fumbles: 11
- Fumble recoveries: 3
- Pass deflections: 30
- Interceptions: 10
- Defensive touchdowns: 1
- Stats at Pro Football Reference

Joseph Robert Schobert (born November 6, 1993) is an American former professional football player who was a linebacker in the National Football League (NFL). Schobert played college football for the Wisconsin Badgers, winning the Jack Lambert Trophy in 2015, as the nation's best linebacker. He was selected by the Cleveland Browns in the fourth round of the 2016 NFL draft. He was named to the Pro Bowl with the Browns in 2017.

== Early life ==
Schobert mainly played running back and safety in high school, in addition to returning punts and kicks. As a junior, he was a part of the Waukesha West team that won the WIAA Division 1 state title. During the championship game he set the rushing record with 296 yards on 38 carries. In his senior season, he rushed for 1,452 yards with 23 touchdowns.

Schobert was not rated or ranked by any of the major college ranking systems. He didn't receive any NCAA Division I scholarship offers. He wanted to play for the Wisconsin Badgers but was originally told he could tryout after the 2012 season started. Due to the lack of interest shown by Wisconsin, the only Division I football program in the state, he planned to attend Division I FCS University of North Dakota and join the Fighting Hawks as a walk-on.

In July 2012, Schobert's outstanding performance in the WFCA Large School All-Star Game in which he played running back, safety and kick returner, tallying 145 all-purpose yards, two tackles, two pass-breakups and an interception caught the attention of Kenosha Bradford football coach Jed Kennedy. When he learned that Schobert's only opportunity to play Division I college football was as a walk-on at North Dakota, he contacted people he knew in the University of Wisconsin athletic department. The day before Schobert was to depart for Grand Forks, North Dakota, Badgers head coach Bret Bielema offered him a preferred walk-on spot. In Schobert's own words: "They had a great coaching staff up there. I liked them. I thought I would have fit in, but Madison offered at the last second. It was a dream come true for a Wisconsin kid, so I had to jump on it. The rest has been history."

== College career ==
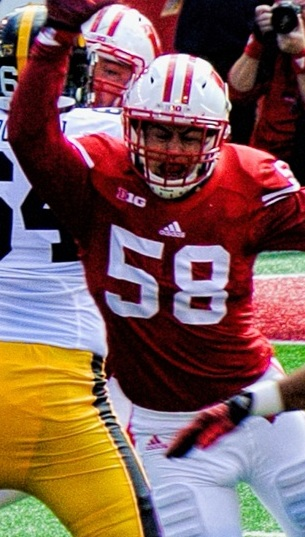
Schobert in 2015

Schobert attended the University of Wisconsin-Madison, a member of the Big Ten Conference, where he played outside linebacker for the Wisconsin Badgers football team from 2012 through 2015.

=== 2012 ===
During his freshman season Schobert played in five games but recorded no statistics. However, he was named 2012 Defensive Scout Team Player of the Year and brought on scholarship as a result.

=== 2013 ===
As a sophomore Schobert played in all 13 games and started in one game, against Arizona State in which he recorded five tackles and one tackle for loss. He recorded 24 tackles, 2.5 tackles for loss, one sack and three passes defensed.

=== 2014 ===
The 2014 season saw the Badgers replace all 4 starting linebackers from 2013. Schobert and Vince Biegel replaced the starting outside linebackers while Derek Landisch and Marcus Trotter replaced the starting inside linebackers. Schobert and Biegel were described by former teammate Marcus Trotter as exact opposites, he described Biegel as "a hamster on a wheel, man. He's just always running." while he said "Schobert is the exact opposite. He's very calm all the time."

Schobert had a breakout season in 2014, he started all 14 games. By the end of the season he ranked first on the team in pass breakups with seven, second on the team in tackles for a loss with 13.5 and fourth on the team in tackles with 69. As a result, Schobert was named a consensus honorable mention All Big Ten. Schobert was named Big Ten Defensive Player of the Week for week 8 after his defensive performance against Nebraska on November 15. Schobert tallied 11 tackles, 2.5 tackles for loss, 0.5 sacks, 1 pass defensed and fumble recovery.

At the end of the season Schobert was named Honorable mention All-Big Ten.

=== 2015 ===
2015 saw the Badgers replace the starting inside linebackers again while Schobert and Biegel started opposite one another again. While Biegel was named to numerous preseason award watchlists Schobert was not. Nonetheless Schobert was named as a semifinalist for the Bednarik and Lombardi Awards in addition to the Lott IMPACT Trophy watch list.

In Wisconsin's season opener against Alabama, Schobert led the Badgers in total tackles with 13 and added four tackles for a loss and two sacks.

He was named Big Ten co-Defensive Player of the Week after week 5 after the Wisconsin-Iowa game in Madison where Iowa defeated Wisconsin 6–10. During the game Schobert recorded 8 tackles, 3.5 tackles-for-loss, 3 sacks, 5 quarterback hurries, 2 force fumbles, 1 fumble recovery. He shared Defensive Player of the Week with Iowa defensive back Desmond King who had nine tackles and two interceptions

Against Maryland in week 7 Schobert relived his high school days at tailback when he rushed for 57 yards on a fake punt on 4th and one.

In late November he accepted an invitation to play in the 2016 Senior Bowl which will be played at Ladd–Peebles Stadium in Mobile, Alabama. At the end of the regular season Schobert was named the Big Ten Butkus–Fitzgerald Linebacker of the Year in addition to being named First-team All-Big Ten by Coaches and Media. At the annual Badgers year-end honors banquet Schobert was the recipient of the Jimmy Demetral Team MVP award.

Schobert was named to the first-team All-America Team by FWAA and ESPN. He also earned second-team All-America honors by the AP, Walter Camp, USA Today, CBS Sports, Sporting News and Athlon Sports.

During the 2016 Senior Bowl Schobert played on the North team. Schobert bulked up for the game, weighing in at 247 lbs, 11 lbs heavier than his official weight on the Badgers roster. ESPN's Kevin Weidl commented on Schobert being a "savvy" pass rusher and that he "holds up well in space". WGN Radio Bears Insider Adam Hoge reported that Schobert's weight gain seemingly didn't affect his agility, his technique was exceptional during practices and he was "doing everything right in practices and has looked good in coverage".

During the Senior Bowl, Schobert's teammate K.J. Dillon blocked a 33-yard field goal attempt by Ross Martin, Schobert was able to recover the ball and return it for 73 yards to the opposition's 6-yard line before being tackled by Jerell Adams.

=== College statistics ===
Year	Team	GP	Solo	Ast	Total	TFL	TFLyds	Sack	INT	PD	FF	FR
2012	Wisconsin	5	0	0	0	0.0	0	0.0	0	0	0	0
2013	Wisconsin	13	12	12	24	2.5	13	1.0	0	3	0	0
2014	Wisconsin	14	44	25	69	13.5	52	3.0	0	7	2	1
2015	Wisconsin	13	39	40	79	19.5	98	9.5	1	3	5	2
Totals		45	95	77	172	35.5	163	13.5	1	13	7	3

== Professional career ==
=== Pre-draft ===
Coming out of Wisconsin, Schobert was projected to be a third- or fourth-round pick by the majority of NFL draft experts and scouts. He received an invitation to the NFL Combine and completed all the combine and positional drills. On March 9, 2016, he participated at Wisconsin's pro day and chose to perform only the vertical jump and broad jumps, improving on them both. Team representatives and scouts from 25 NFL teams were present to scout Schobert, Alex Erickson, Derek Watt, Joel Stave, Tyler Marz, and six other Wisconsin prospects for Wisconsin's pro day. Schobert was ranked the 12th best outside linebacker prospect available in the draft by NFLDraftScout.com and was ranked the 12th best linebacker by Sports Illustrated.

Pre-draft measurables
Height	Weight	Arm length	Hand span	40-yard dash	10-yard split	20-yard split	20-yard shuttle	Three-cone drill	Vertical jump	Broad jump	Bench press
6 ft 1 3/8 in (1.86 m)	244 lb (111 kg)	31 1/2 in (0.80 m)	9 3/4 in (0.25 m)	4.74 s	1.62 s	2.77 s	4.30 s	7.11 s	33 1/2 in (0.85 m)	9 ft 3 in (2.82 m)	22 reps
All values from NFL Combine

=== Cleveland Browns ===
==== 2016 ====
The Cleveland Browns selected Schobert in the fourth round with the 99th overall pick in the 2016 NFL draft. He was the 12th linebacker selected in the draft.

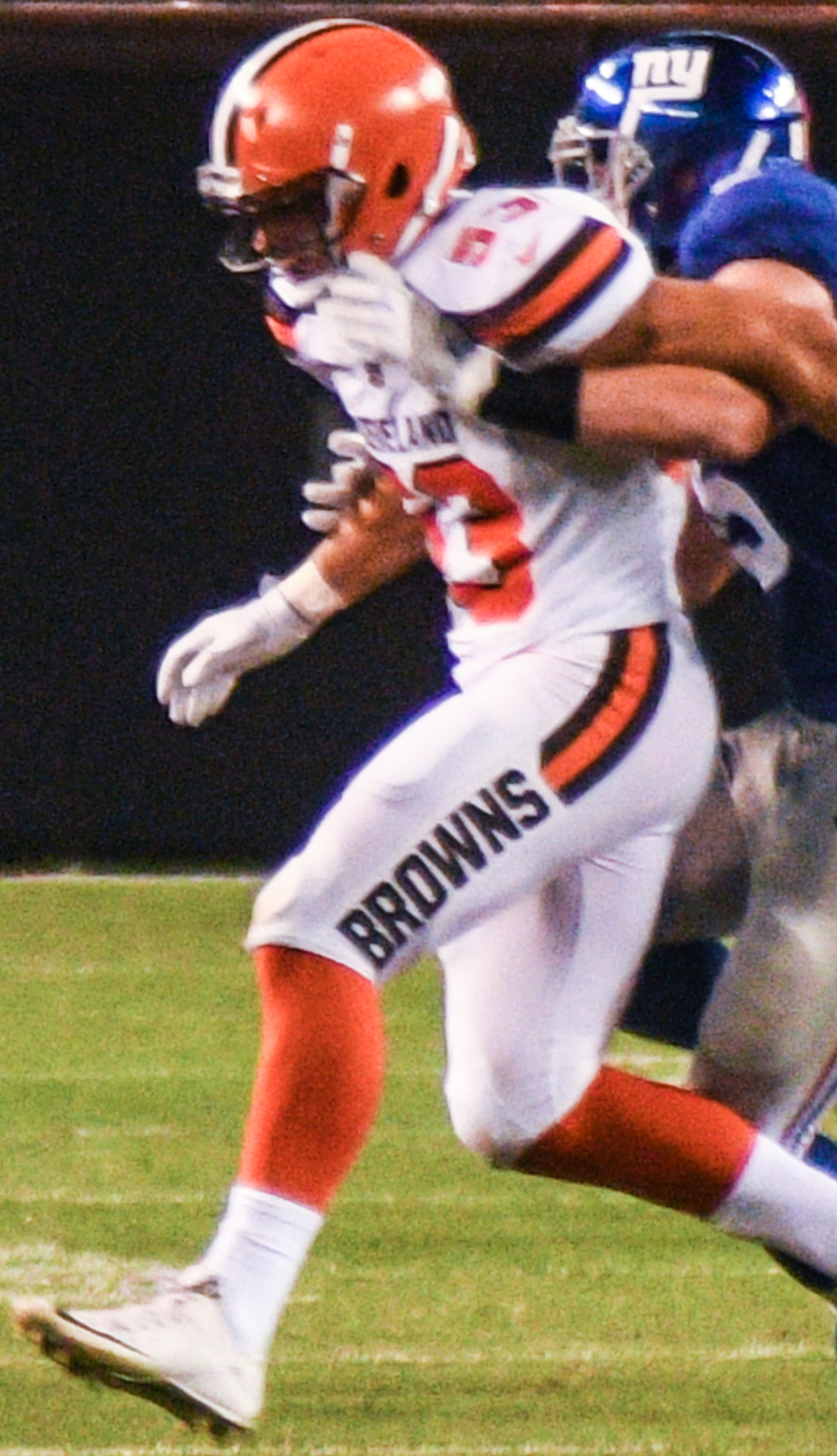
Schobert in 2017

On June 8, Schobert signed a four-year contract worth about $2.97 million, which included a signing bonus worth about $634,000.

He competed with Paul Kruger, Barkevious Mingo, Nate Orchard, and Emmanuel Ogbah for the starting outside linebacker job. The Cleveland Browns released veteran Paul Kruger and traded Barkevious Mingo to the New England Patriots after Schobert showed promise throughout training camp and named the backup right outside linebacker behind Emmanuel Ogbah.

He made his professional regular season debut during the Cleveland Browns' season-opening 10–29 loss to the Philadelphia Eagles, finishing with a solo tackle and a pass deflection. The following week, he earned his first career start and made one tackle in a 20–25 loss to the Baltimore Ravens. On October 30, 2016, Schobert made his third start and recorded three combined tackles and was credited with a half a sack when he made the first of his career on New York Jets quarterback Ryan Fitzpatrick. The Browns went on to lose to the Jets, 28–31. He finished his rookie season with 28 combined tackles (19 solo), a half a sack, and a pass deflection in four starts and 16 games.

==== 2017 ====
Schobert competed with Tank Carder for the starting middle linebacker position after defensive coordinator Ray Horton was fired and new defensive coordinator Gregg Williams replaced his 3-4 base with a 4–3. He started the Browns' season-opening 18–21 loss to the Pittsburgh Steelers and finished with nine combined tackles. On October 15, 2017, Schobert recorded 13 combined tackles as the Browns were defeated by the Houston Texans, 17–33. Schobert started all 16 games at middle linebacker, finishing tied for first in the NFL with 144 tackles with Bills' linebacker Preston Brown and Packers' linebacker Blake Martinez. On January 16, 2018, he was named to his first Pro Bowl as a replacement for the injured Ryan Shazier.

==== 2018 ====
In Week 3 against the Jets, Schobert made a game clinching interception to help give the Cleveland Browns their first win since December 24, 2016. In Week 4 against the Oakland Raiders, Schobert made 14 tackles and sacked quarterback Derek Carr once. He ended the 2018 season with 103 tackles, three sacks, an interception, two forced fumbles, two fumble recoveries, and six passes defended.

==== 2019 ====
In Week 2 against the New York Jets, Schobert recorded a team high 13 tackles in the 23–3 win. In Week 4 against the Baltimore Ravens, Schobert recorded a team high 17 tackles and sacked Lamar Jackson once in the 40–25 win. In Week 9 against the Denver Broncos, Schobert forced a fumble on wide receiver Diontae Spencer that was recovered by teammate Denzel Ward in the 24–19 loss. In Week 11 against the Steelers on Thursday Night Football, Schobert recorded a team high 10 tackles, sacked Mason Rudolph once, and recorded two interceptions off Rudolph in the 21–7 win. In the following week's game against the Miami Dolphins, Schobert recorded two more interceptions off Ryan Fitzpatrick in the 41–24 win. He also had five tackles and four passes defensed in the game, earning AFC Defensive Player of the Week honors. He finished the 2019 season with 133 tackles, two sacks, four interceptions and two forced fumbles.

=== Jacksonville Jaguars ===
On April 15, 2020, the Jacksonville Jaguars signed Schobert to a five-year, $53.75 million contract that included $21.50 million guaranteed and a signing bonus of $12 million. In Week 6 against the Detroit Lions, Schobert led the team with 10 tackles and recorded his first interception as a Jaguar off a pass thrown by Matthew Stafford during the 34–16 loss. In Week 13 against the Minnesota Vikings, Schobert led the team with 12 tackles, sacked Kirk Cousins once, and intercepted a pass thrown by Cousins that he returned for a 43-yard touchdown during the 27–24 overtime loss. In Week 16 against the Chicago Bears, Schobert recorded a sack on Mitchell Trubisky and also intercepted a pass thrown by Trubisky during the 41–17 loss. In the 2020 season, he finished with 2.5 sacks, 141 total tackles (84 solo), three interceptions, one pick-six, and four passes defended.

=== Pittsburgh Steelers ===
On August 14, 2021, Schobert was traded to the Pittsburgh Steelers for a 2022 sixth-round pick. He started 15 games that season and finished the year with 112 tackles, one interception, one forced fumble and six passes defended. On March 17, 2022, Schobert was released by the Steelers.

=== Denver Broncos ===
On August 15, 2022, Schobert signed a deal with the Denver Broncos. On August 23, Schobert was released by the Broncos.

=== Tennessee Titans ===
On September 27, 2022, Schobert was signed to the practice squad of the Tennessee Titans. He was re–signed to the active roster on November 15. Schobert finished the season with the Titans (starting one game), recording 16 tackles and forcing one fumble. He was released by Tennessee on December 12.

== Personal life ==
Schobert was raised in Waukesha, Wisconsin. He got engaged to his long-time girlfriend in March 2017 in front of the Eiffel Tower, and the couple married in July 2018. They now have two sons and co-own a dance studio in Castle Rock, Colorado called Schotime Dance Center.
