= Darryl Roberts (American football) =

American football player (born 1990)

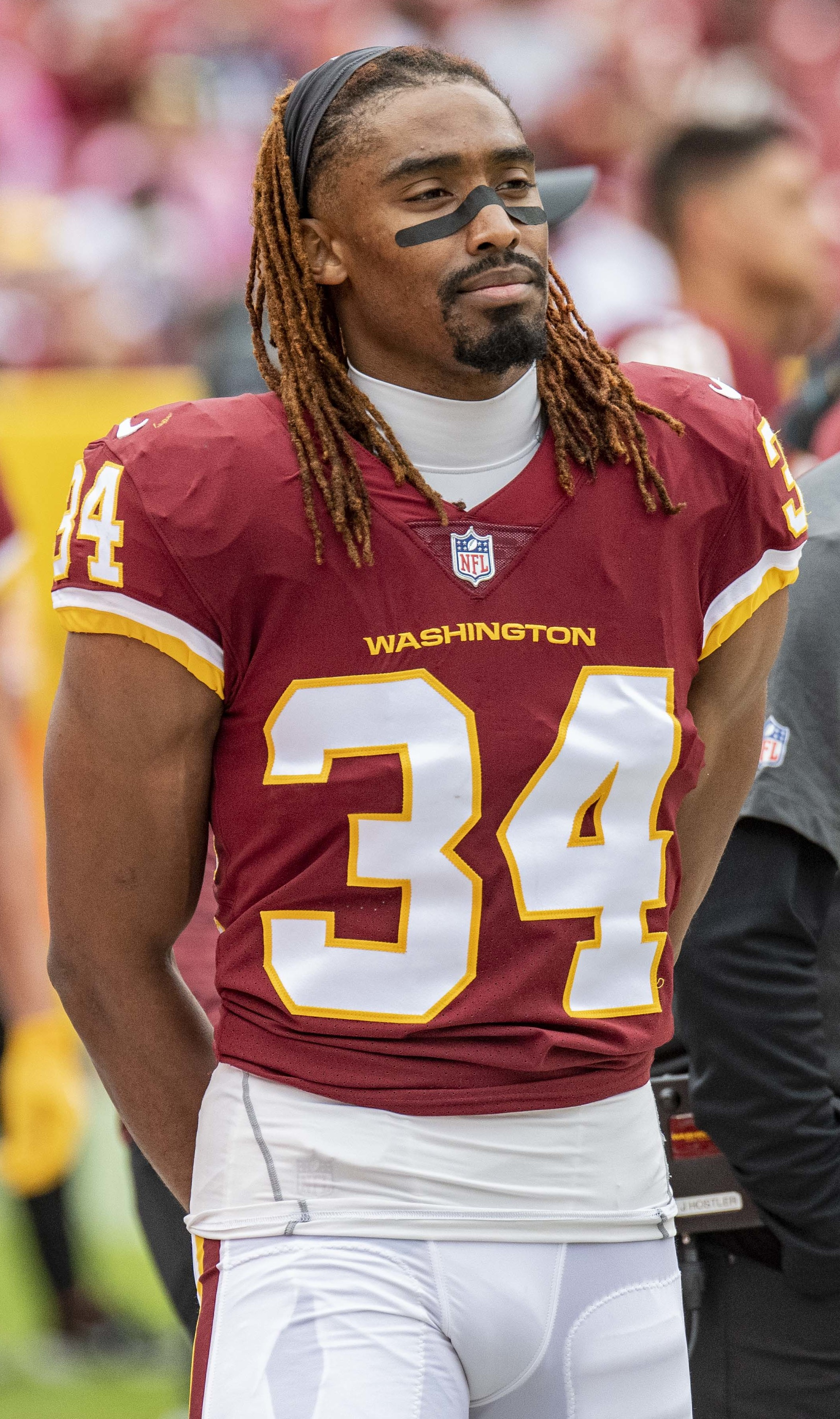
- Roberts with the Washington Football Team in 2021

No. 27, 29, 34
- Position: Cornerback

Personal information
- Born: November 26, 1990 (age 35); Lakeland, Florida, U.S.
- Listed height: 6 ft 0 in (1.83 m)
- Listed weight: 182 lb (83 kg)

Career information
- High school: Lakeland
- College: Marshall
- NFL draft: 2015: 7th round, 247th overall pick

Career history
- New England Patriots (2015); New York Jets (2016–2019); Detroit Lions (2020); Washington Football Team (2021)

Career NFL statistics
- Total tackles: 223
- Forced fumbles: 1
- Pass deflections: 33
- Interceptions: 4
- Stats at Pro Football Reference

Darryl Keith Roberts (born November 26, 1990) is an American former professional football player who was a cornerback in the National Football League (NFL). He played college football for the Marshall Thundering Herd and was selected by the New England Patriots in the seventh round of the 2015 NFL draft. He was also a member of the New York Jets, Detroit Lions, and Washington Football Team.

== Professional career ==
Pre-draft measurables
Height	Weight	Arm length	Hand span	40-yard dash	10-yard split	20-yard split	20-yard shuttle	Three-cone drill	Vertical jump	Broad jump	Bench press
5 ft 11 in (1.80 m)	187 lb (85 kg)	30 5/8 in (0.78 m)	9 1/8 in (0.23 m)	4.38 s	1.48 s	2.50 s	4.06 s	6.66 s	39 in (0.99 m)	11 ft 1 in (3.38 m)	23 reps
All values from Marshall's Pro Day

=== New England Patriots ===
The New England Patriots selected Roberts in the seventh round (247th overall) of the 2015 NFL draft. He signed his four-year rookie contract, worth $2.3 million, on May 8, 2015.

During training camp, Roberts competed to be a backup cornerback against Tarell Brown, Robert McClain, Bradley Fletcher, Justin Coleman, and Leonard Johnson. On September 1, 2015, Roberts was placed on season-ending injured reserve after injuring his wrist in the first preseason game against the Green Bay Packers. Roberts was released on September 3, 2016.

=== New York Jets ===
Roberts was claimed off waivers by the New York Jets on September 4, 2016. In 2018, Roberts played in all 16 games with 10 starts, recording 48 combined tackles, seven passes defensed, and an interception. On March 14, 2019, Roberts signed a three-year, $18 million contract extension with the Jets. Roberts was released on March 21, 2020.

=== Detroit Lions ===
On April 2, 2020, the Detroit Lions signed Roberts to a one-year contract. He was placed on injured reserve on November 7, 2020, and was re-activated a month later.

=== Washington Football Team ===
Roberts signed with the Washington Football Team on March 26, 2021. He was placed on injured reserve on October 13, 2021, and returned to the active roster on December 2, 2021. On December 11, he was placed on COVID-19 reserve list and was activated again three days later.

== NFL career statistics ==
Legend
**Bold**	Career high

Year	Team	Games		Tackles					Interceptions					Fumbles			
Year	Team	GP	GS	Cmb	Solo	Ast	Sck	TFL	Int	Yds	TD	Lng	PD	FF	FR	Yds	TD
2016	NYJ	12	2	21	19	2	0.0	0	0	0	0	0	6	0	0	0	0
2017	NYJ	15	4	40	37	3	0.0	0	**1**	0	0	0	**8**	0	0	0	0
2018	NYJ	**16**	**10**	48	41	**7**	0.0	**3**	**1**	3	0	3	7	0	0	0	0
2019	NYJ	13	**10**	**63**	**58**	5	0.0	1	**1**	**13**	0	**13**	6	0	0	0	0
2020	DET	11	5	39	34	5	0.0	1	**1**	6	0	6	6	0	0	0	0
2021	WAS	6	3	12	6	6	0.0	0	0	0	0	0	0	0	0	0	0
		73	34	223	195	28	0.0	5	4	22	0	13	33	0	0	0	0
