= Brian Parker (American football) =

American football player (born 1992)

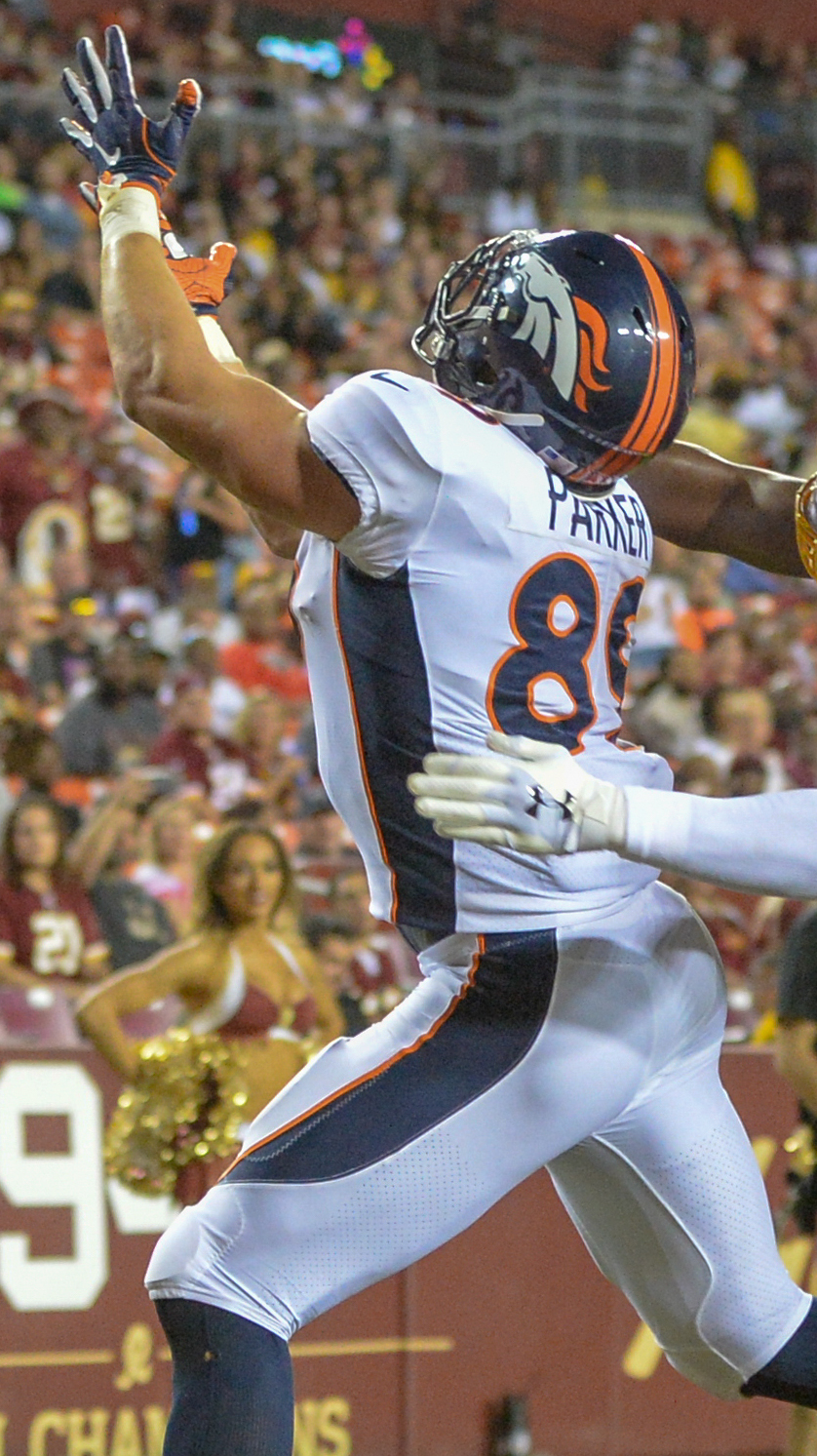
- Parker with the Denver Broncos in 2018

No. 82, 89
- Position: Tight end

Personal information
- Born: May 30, 1992 (age 34); Rochester, New York, U.S.
- Listed height: 6 ft 4 in (1.93 m)
- Listed weight: 265 lb (120 kg)

Career information
- High school: McQuaid Jesuit (Rochester)
- College: Albany
- NFL draft: 2015: undrafted

Career history
- San Diego Chargers (2015)*; Kansas City Chiefs (2015); New York Jets (2016–2017)*; Denver Broncos (2017–2018); New Orleans Saints (2019)
- * Offseason or practice squad member only

Career NFL statistics
- Receptions: 6
- Receiving yards: 39
- Receiving touchdowns: 0
- Stats at Pro Football Reference

Brian Parker (born May 30, 1992) is an American former professional football player who was a tight end in the National Football League (NFL). He was signed by the San Diego Chargers as an undrafted free agent in 2015. He played college football for the Albany Great Danes. After retirement following the 2019-20 NFL season, Brian enrolled in law school at the University of Denver. He is now a practicing attorney in the state of Colorado.

== Professional career ==
Pre-draft measurables
Height	Weight	Arm length	Hand span	40-yard dash	10-yard split	20-yard split	20-yard shuttle	Three-cone drill	Vertical jump	Broad jump	Bench press
6 ft 4 1/2 in (1.94 m)	265 lb (120 kg)	33 1/2 in (0.85 m)	10 1/8 in (0.26 m)	4.75 s	1.58 s	2.64 s	4.40 s	7.03 s	38.5 in (0.98 m)	9 ft 11 in (3.02 m)	25 reps
All values from Pro Day

=== San Diego Chargers ===
After going unselected in the 2015 NFL draft, Parker signed with the San Diego Chargers on May 2, 2015.

=== Kansas City Chiefs ===
After being put on the waiver wire by the San Diego Chargers, Parker was picked up off waivers on September 6, 2015, by the Kansas City Chiefs. Parker made his NFL debut on November 1, 2015, against the Detroit Lions at Wembley Stadium in London. He played in nine regular season games and two playoff games with the Chiefs. On September 3, 2016, he was released by the Chiefs.

=== New York Jets ===
Parker was claimed off waivers by the New York Jets on September 4, 2016. He was waived two days later after failing his physical.

On April 6, 2017, Parker was re-signed by the Jets. On August 4, 2017, he was waived/injured by the Jets and placed on injured reserve. He was released by the team on August 11, 2017.

=== Denver Broncos ===
On November 15, 2017, Parker was signed to the Denver Broncos' practice squad. He signed a reserve/future contract with the Broncos on January 1, 2018.

On September 1, 2018, Parker was waived by the Broncos and was signed to the practice squad the next day. He was promoted to the active roster on September 29, 2018. He played in 13 regular season games with two starts.

=== New Orleans Saints ===
On October 16, 2019, Parker was signed by the New Orleans Saints, but was released three days later.
