= Kevin Short (American football) =

American football player (born 1992)

No. 46, 36, 32, 37
- Position: Cornerback

Personal information
- Born: March 23, 1992 (age 34); Florissant, Missouri, U.S.
- Listed height: 6 ft 2 in (1.88 m)
- Listed weight: 185 lb (84 kg)

Career information
- High school: Hazelwood Central (Florissant, Missouri)
- College: Fort Scott CC (2011–2012); Kansas (2013)
- NFL draft: 2015: undrafted

Career history
- Kansas City Chiefs (2015)*; Seattle Seahawks (2015)*; New York Jets (2015–2016)*; Los Angeles Rams (2016–2017)*; Rio Grande Valley Dorados (2019); West Virginia Roughriders (2020); West Texas Warbirds (2023)*
- * Offseason or practice squad member only

Kevin Short (born March 23, 1992) is an American former football cornerback. He played college football at Fort Scott Community College. He transferred to the University of Kansas but withdrew before playing there.

== Professional career ==
=== Kansas City Chiefs ===
On July 10, 2015, Short signed with the Kansas City Chiefs as an undrafted free agent. On September 5, 2015, he was waived by the Chiefs.

=== Seattle Seahawks ===
On September 7, 2015, Short was signed to the Seattle Seahawks' practice squad. On November 16, 2015, he was released.

=== New York Jets ===
On November 19, 2015, Short was signed to the New York Jets' practice squad.

Short signed a futures contract on January 5, 2016. On September 3, 2016, he was released by the Jets as part of final roster cuts.

=== Los Angeles Rams ===
On December 19, 2016, Short was signed to the Los Angeles Rams' practice squad. He signed a reserve/future contract with the Rams on January 3, 2017. On April 19, 2017, Short was waived by the Rams.

=== West Texas Warbirds ===
On October 19, 2022, Short signed with the West Texas Warbirds of the National Arena League (NAL). On February 13, 2023, Short retired from professional football.

== Coaching career ==
Short coached football at Feather River Community College in 2017 and Mansfield University in 2018, where he was the Head Secondary and Return specialist for both programs.
