= Craig Watts =

American football player and coach (born 1991)

Craig Watts Jr.
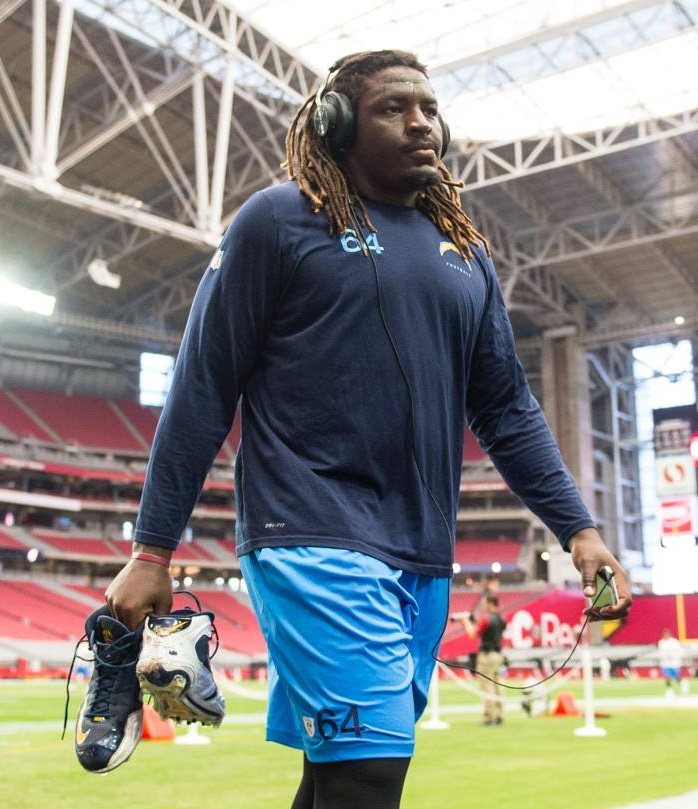

Baylor
- Title: Quality control coach

Personal information
- Born: June 20, 1991 (age 35); Colorado Springs, Colorado
- Listed height: 6 ft 4 in (1.93 m)
- Listed weight: 325 lb (147 kg)

Career information
- High school: Killeen (TX)
- College: West Texas A&M
- NFL draft: 2014: undrafted

Career history

Playing
- San Diego Chargers (2014–2015); New York Jets (2016)

Coaching
- Nevada (2021-2022) Graduate assistant; Colorado State (2022-2023) Graduate assistant; Baylor (2023-2024) Graduate assistant; Baylor (2025-Present) Assistant Offensive Line Coach
- Stats at Pro Football Reference

Craig Watts Jr. (born June 20, 1991) is an American football coach and former offensive guard. He was signed by the San Diego Chargers as an undrafted free agent in 2014. He attended West Texas A&M where he was a four-year letterman and twice named as a team captain during his junior and senior years. Watts acquired numerous accolades during his collegiate career, including Conference Offensive Lineman of the Year and First-team All-American.

== Professional career ==
=== San Diego Chargers ===
After going undrafted in the 2014 NFL Draft, Watts was signed by the San Diego Chargers on May 22, 2014, following an impressive showing during the Chargers' Rookie Mini-Camp. On August 30, 2014, despite a productive pre-season, he was waived by the Chargers. On August 31, 2014, Watts was re-signed to the practice squad. On December 17, 2014, he was placed on the reserve/suspended list. On December 30, 2014, Watts was signed a future contract.

On September 21, 2015, Watts was waived by the Chargers. On September 25, 2015, he was signed to the practice squad. On November 9, 2015, he was elevated to the active roster. against the Chicago Bears. On November 10, 2015, Watts was once again waived. On November 12, 2015, he was re-signed to the Chargers' practice squad. On December 20, 2015, Watts was once again released from the team.

=== New York Jets ===
Watts signed a reserve/future contract with the New York Jets on January 11, 2016. He was released as a part of the final roster cuts on September 3, 2016. He was signed to the team's practice squad a day later. He was promoted to the active roster on December 13, 2016.

On September 1, 2017, Watts was waived by the Jets.

== Coaching career ==
=== Colorado State ===
In January 2022, Watts joined Jay Norvell's staff at Colorado State as an offensive graduate assistant working with the offensive line.

=== Baylor ===
In February 2023, Watts joined Dave Aranda's staff at Baylor University as an offensive line graduate assistant.
