= Juston Burris =

American football player (born 1993)

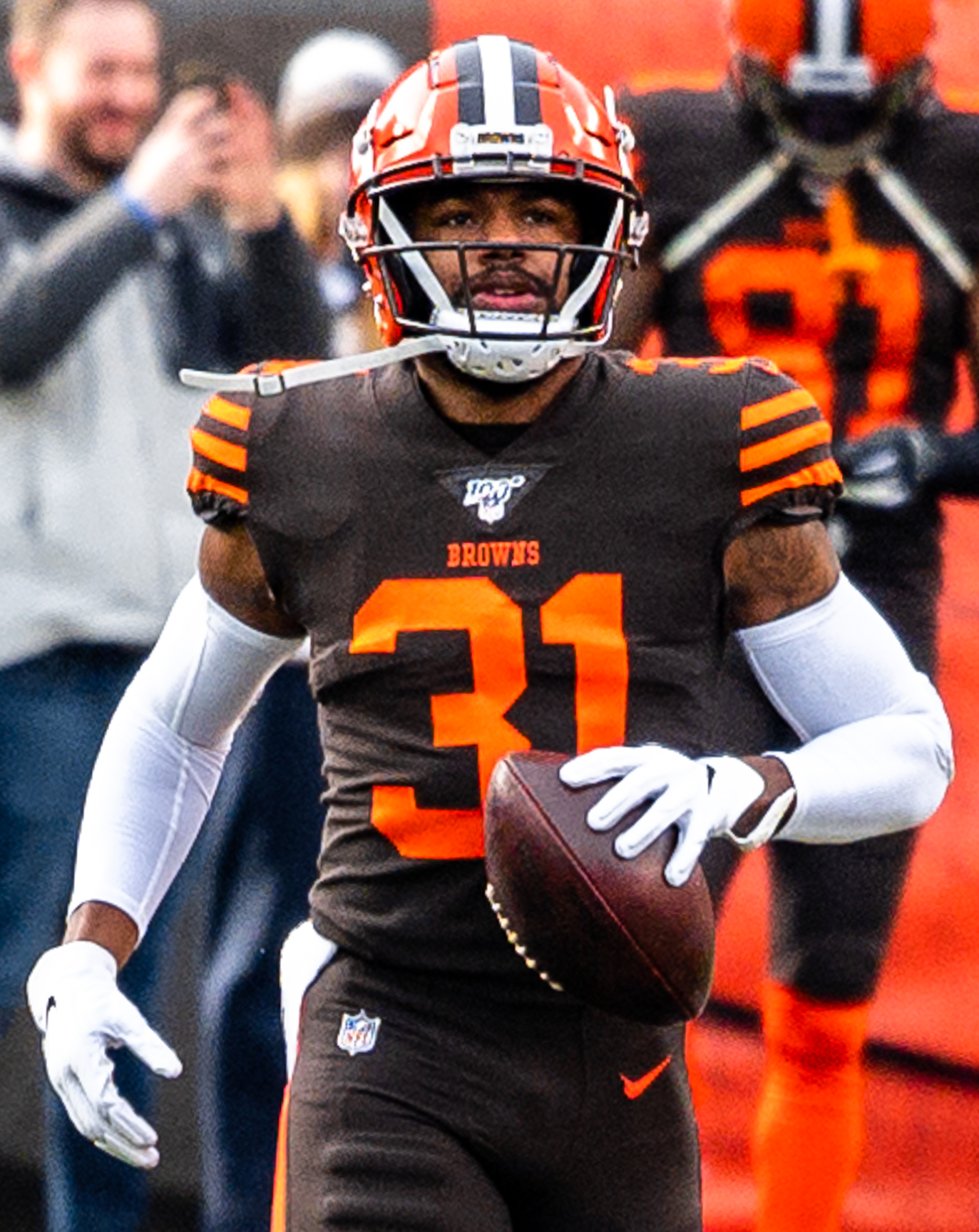
- Burris with the Cleveland Browns in 2019

No. 31, 32
- Position: Safety

Personal information
- Born: August 4, 1993 (age 33); Roanoke, Virginia, U.S.
- Listed height: 6 ft 0 in (1.83 m)
- Listed weight: 210 lb (95 kg)

Career information
- High school: Broughton (Raleigh, North Carolina)
- College: NC State (2011–2015)
- NFL draft: 2016: 4th round, 118th overall pick

Career history
- New York Jets (2016–2018); Cleveland Browns (2018); Oakland Raiders (2019); Cleveland Browns (2019); Carolina Panthers (2020–2022)

Career NFL statistics
- Total tackles: 167
- Sacks: 1
- Forced fumbles: 2
- Fumble recoveries: 1
- Pass deflections: 20
- Interceptions: 6
- Stats at Pro Football Reference

Juston Burris (born August 4, 1993) is an American former professional football player who was a safety in the National Football League (NFL). He played college football for the NC State Wolfpack and was selected by the New York Jets in the fourth round of the 2016 NFL draft. He played in the National Football League (NFL) for the Jets, Cleveland Browns, Oakland Raiders and Carolina Panthers.

== Early life ==
Burris was selected to the NCPreps.com 4A all-state and All-conference teams in his senior season. He scored 11 touchdowns and had just under 1,000 receiving yards, 40 tackles and three interceptions in his senior year. He was also selected to the NC vs SC Shrine Bowl, making him All-State.

== College career ==
At North Carolina State University, Burris started 28 straight games at cornerback. As a junior with the Wolfpack, he was sixth on the team in tackles and led the team in pass break ups.

== Professional career ==
Pre-draft measurables
Height	Weight	Arm length	Hand span	40-yard dash	20-yard shuttle	Three-cone drill	Vertical jump	Broad jump	Bench press
6 ft 0 1/4 in (1.84 m)	212 lb (96 kg)	31 1/2 in (0.80 m)	8 7/8 in (0.23 m)	4.53 s	4.40 s	7.10 s	36.5 in (0.93 m)	10 ft 2 in (3.10 m)	19 reps
All values from NFL Combine

=== New York Jets ===
On April 30, 2016, Burris was selected by the New York Jets in the fourth round (118th overall) in the 2016 NFL draft.

On September 10, 2017, in the season opener against the Buffalo Bills, Burris recorded an interception off of quarterback Tyrod Taylor. Burris's play occurred on the Jets' own 8-yard line and ended a long opening drive from the Bills.

On October 27, 2018, Burris was waived by the Jets and re-signed to the practice squad.

=== Cleveland Browns (first stint) ===
Burris was signed off the Jets' practice squad by the Cleveland Browns on November 7, 2018.

On April 1, 2019, Burris re-signed with the Browns. He was waived on September 1.

=== Oakland Raiders ===
On September 13, 2019, Burris signed with the Oakland Raiders, but was waived six days later.

=== Cleveland Browns (second stint) ===
Burris was claimed off waivers by the Browns on September 20, 2019. In Week 11 against the Pittsburgh Steelers on Thursday Night Football, Burris sacked Mason Rudolph once and intercepted a pass thrown by Rudolph in the 21–7 win.

=== Carolina Panthers ===
On March 20, 2020, Burris signed a two-year, $8 million contract with the Carolina Panthers. He was named the Panthers' starting safety to start the season. He started the first six games before suffering an injury to his ribs in Week 6. He was placed on injured reserve on October 20. He was activated on November 14.

Burris entered the 2021 season as the Panthers' starting strong safety. He was placed on injured reserve on September 28, 2021. He was activated on November 13.

On March 24, 2022, Burris re-signed with the Panthers on a one-year deal. He was released on August 30 and signed to the practice squad the next day. He was promoted to the active roster on October 5.

== Post–playing career ==
On June 9, 2023, Burris was hired by the Carolina Panthers as a scouting intern.
