= Bryson Keeton =

American football player (born 1993)

No. 37
- Position: Cornerback

Personal information
- Born: February 24, 1993 (age 33); Bakersfield, California, U.S.
- Listed height: 6 ft 1 in (1.85 m)
- Listed weight: 190 lb (86 kg)

Career information
- High school: Ridgeview (Bakersfield)
- College: Montana State
- NFL draft: 2016: undrafted

Career history
- New York Jets (2016–2017)

Career NFL statistics
- Total tackles: 1
- Stats at Pro Football Reference

Bryson Rashon Keeton (born February 24, 1993) is an American former professional football player who was a cornerback in the National Football League (NFL). Keeton was signed by the New York Jets as an undrafted free agent in 2016. He played college football for the Montana State Bobcats.

== Early life ==
Keeton was a three-time all-league defensive back at Bakersfield Ridgeview high school in Bakersfield, California.

== Professional career ==
The New York Jets signed Keeton as an undrafted free agent following a tryout during their rookie minicamp. Keeton was waived on September 3, 2016 as part of the final roster cuts and was signed to the practice squad the following day. He was promoted to the active roster on December 30, 2016.

On July 30, 2017, Keeton was waived/injured by the Jets and placed on injured reserve.

On May 7, 2018, Keeton was waived by the Jets.

== Personal life ==
His cousin Tony Brackens played eight seasons for the Jacksonville Jaguars in the NFL.

On September 6, 2022, Keeton became a Partner at an international venture capital investment conglomerate Venturerock.
