= Claude Pelon =

American football player (born 1992)

No. 66, 91, 97
- Position: Defensive end

Personal information
- Born: November 27, 1992 (age 33); Miami, Florida, U.S.
- Listed height: 6 ft 5 in (1.96 m)
- Listed weight: 300 lb (136 kg)

Career information
- High school: Orlando (FL) Agape Christian
- College: USC
- NFL draft: 2016: undrafted

Career history
- New York Jets (2016–2017); Tennessee Titans (2018)*
- * Offseason or practice squad member only

Career NFL statistics
- Total tackles: 2
- Sacks: 0
- Forced fumbles: 0
- Fumble recoveries: 0
- Stats at Pro Football Reference

Claudeson Pelon (born November 27, 1992) is an American former professional football player who was a defensive end in the National Football League (NFL). He played college football for the USC Trojans and was signed by the New York Jets as an undrafted free agent in 2016.

== Early life ==
Pelon attended Agape Christian Academy in Orlando, Florida where he was named to the All-Conference team his senior season in 2010. Pelon had 68 tackles with nine sacks during his senior season.

== Professional career ==
=== New York Jets ===
On April 30, 2016, Pelon signed with the New York Jets as an undrafted free agent following the conclusion of the 2016 NFL draft. On September 3, 2016, he was released by the Jets as part of final roster cuts and was signed to the practice squad the next day. He was released from the practice squad on September 19, 2016. He was re-signed to the practice squad on December 7, 2016. He signed a reserve/future contract with the Jets on January 2, 2017.

On September 14, 2017, Pelon was waived by the Jets and was re-signed to the practice squad. He signed a reserve/future contract with the Jets on January 1, 2018.

On June 5, 2018, Pelon was waived/injured by the Jets and placed on injured reserve. He was released on June 12, 2018.

=== Tennessee Titans ===
On July 26, 2018, Pelon signed with the Tennessee Titans, but was waived/injured five days later after suffering a torn ACL.
