= Kyle Friend =

American football player (born 1994)

No. 63, 74
- Position: Center

Personal information
- Born: April 3, 1994 (age 32); Harrisburg, Pennsylvania, U.S.
- Listed height: 6 ft 2 in (1.88 m)
- Listed weight: 305 lb (138 kg)

Career information
- High school: Cumberland Valley (Mechanicsburg, Pennsylvania)
- College: Temple
- NFL draft: 2016: undrafted

Career history
- New York Jets (2016)*; Pittsburgh Steelers (2017)*; Carolina Panthers (2018)*; Arizona Cardinals (2018)*; Cleveland Browns (2018–2019)*
- * Offseason or practice squad member only

Awards and highlights
- First team All-AAC (2015)
- Stats at Pro Football Reference

Kyle Allen Friend (born April 3, 1994) is an American former professional football center. He played college football at Temple and signed with the New York Jets as an undrafted free agent in 2016.

== Early life ==
Friend attended Cumberland Valley High School where he was selected to the 2010 and 2011 Associated Press All-State first-team and 2011 Harrisburg Patriot-News All-Area first-team. He was named to the 2011 Harrisburg Patriot-News All-Area first-team and 2011 Mid-Penn All-Conference. He was named Defensive Player of the Year and helped Cumberland Valley High School football team win back-to-back district championships in 2009 and 2010.

== Professional career ==
Coming out of Temple, Friend was projected by the majority of NFL draft experts and scouts to be selected in the seventh round or be signed as a priority undrafted free agent.

Pre-draft measurables
Height	Weight	40-yard dash	10-yard split	20-yard split	20-yard shuttle	Three-cone drill	Vertical jump	Broad jump	Bench press
6 ft 2 in (1.88 m)	305 lb (138 kg)	5.09 s	1.71 s	2.86 s	4.69 s	7.48 s	28 1/2 in (0.72 m)	8 ft 6 in (2.59 m)	41 reps
All values from Temple's Pro Day

=== New York Jets ===
On April 30, 2016, Friend signed with the New York Jets as an undrafted free agent following the conclusion of the 2016 NFL draft. On August 28, 2016, he was waived by the Jets. He was re-signed to the practice squad on October 26, 2016. He was released by the Jets on November 1, 2016, but was re-signed on December 20, 2016.

=== Pittsburgh Steelers ===
On February 14, 2017, Friend was signed by the Pittsburgh Steelers. He was waived on September 2, 2017 and was signed to the Steelers' practice squad the next day.

=== Carolina Panthers ===
On May 14, 2018, Friend signed with the Carolina Panthers. He was waived on September 1, 2018.

=== Arizona Cardinals ===
On October 17, 2018, Friend was signed to the Arizona Cardinals practice squad. He was released on October 26, 2018, but was re-signed four days later. He was released on November 7, 2018.

=== Cleveland Browns ===
On December 18, 2018, Friend was signed to the Cleveland Browns practice squad. The Browns signed Friend to a futures contract on January 2, 2019.

Friend was waived by the Browns on April 29, 2019.
