= Tarow Barney =

American football player (born 1994)

Profile
- Position: Defensive tackle

Personal information
- Born: June 8, 1994 (age 32); Pawtucket, Rhode Island
- Listed height: 6 ft 1 in (1.85 m)
- Listed weight: 306 lb (139 kg)

Career information
- High school: Bainbridge (GA)
- College: Penn State
- NFL draft: 2016: undrafted

Career history
- New York Jets (2016)*
- * Offseason or practice squad member only

Tarow Barney (born June 8, 1994) is an American football defensive tackle who is currently a free agent. He played college football for the Penn State Nittany Lions of the Big Ten.

== Early life ==
Barney only played one season of high school football for head coach Ed Pilcher at Bainbridge High School. In his lone season he was an honorable-mention all-region selection as a senior . Made 55 tackles with five sacks in his final year of high school.
