= Ronald Martin (American football) =

American football player (born 1993)

No. 40, 42
- Position: Safety

Personal information
- Born: February 26, 1993 (age 33); Bayou Goula, Louisiana, U.S.
- Listed height: 6 ft 1 in (1.85 m)
- Listed weight: 220 lb (100 kg)

Career information
- High school: White Castle (LA)
- College: LSU
- NFL draft: 2015: undrafted

Career history
- Seattle Seahawks (2015)*; New York Jets (2015–2016); Indianapolis Colts (2017)*; Baltimore Ravens (2017)*; Indianapolis Colts (2017–2018); Atlanta Falcons (2019)*; Dallas Renegades (2020)
- * Offseason or practice squad member only

Awards and highlights
- Second-team All-SEC (2014)

Career NFL statistics
- Total tackles: 2
- Stats at Pro Football Reference

Ronald Jermaine Martin Jr. (born February 26, 1993) is an American former professional football player who was a safety in the National Football League (NFL). He was signed by the Seattle Seahawks as an undrafted free agent in 2015. He played college football for the LSU Tigers.

== Early life ==
Martin attended White Castle High School where he was three-star recruit on Rivals.com and Scout.com. Martin was ranked as the 21st best prospect in the state of Louisiana by Tigerbait.com. Martin was selected to the All-State first-team in football and basketball. Martin was selected to the 2010 LSWA Class 1A All-State football team.

== Professional career ==
=== Seattle Seahawks ===
On May 2, 2015, Martin signed with the Seattle Seahawks as an undrafted free agent following the 2015 NFL draft.

=== New York Jets ===
On September 6, 2015, Martin was claimed off waivers by New York Jets. On September 28, the New York Jets waived Martin. On September 30, Martin was re-signed to the practice squad. On November 12, 2015, the Jets elevate him back to the active roster. On November 21, 2015, he was waived. On November 24, 2015, he was re-signed to the practice squad.

Martin was waived by the Jets on September 4, 2016 and was re-signed to the practice squad. He was released on September 29, 2016. He was re-signed to the practice squad on October 4, 2016. He was promoted to the active roster on December 13, 2016.

=== Indianapolis Colts (first stint) ===
On August 28, 2017, Martin was traded to the Indianapolis Colts for long snapper Thomas Hennessy. He was waived on September 3, 2017 and was signed to the practice squad the next day. He was released by the team on September 12, 2017.

=== Baltimore Ravens ===
On September 18, 2017, Martin was signed to the Baltimore Ravens' practice squad. He was released by the team on October 10, 2017.

=== Indianapolis Colts (second stint) ===
On October 24, 2017, Martin was signed to the Colts' practice squad. He was promoted to the active roster on December 22, 2017.

On September 1, 2018, Martin was waived/injured by the Colts and was placed on injured reserve.

=== Atlanta Falcons ===
On August 2, 2019, Martin was signed by the Atlanta Falcons. He was released on August 31, 2019.

=== Dallas Renegades ===
Martin was selected in the 10th round in phase four in the 2020 XFL draft by the Dallas Renegades. He was placed on injured reserve on December 19, 2019. He had his contract terminated when the league suspended operations on April 10, 2020.
