= Tim Atkins (American football) =

American football coach (born 1979)

Tampa Bay Buccaneers
- Title: Safeties coach

Personal information
- Born: July 19, 1979 (age 47); Omaha, Nebraska, U.S.

Career information
- College: Arizona State University

Career history
- Hamilton High School (AZ) (2001–2003) Assistant defensive backs coach; Whittier (2004–2005) Safeties coach & wide receivers coach; Miami Dolphins (2006–2007) Defensive assistant; Florida Atlantic (2008–2009) Graduate assistant & defensive quality control coach; Buffalo Bills (2011–2012) Defensive assistant; Cleveland Browns (2014–2015) Defensive assistant; New York Jets (2016–2018) Defensive support staff; Tampa Bay Buccaneers (2019–present); Defensive quality control coach (2019–2021); Assistant secondary coach (2022–2025); Safeties coach (2026–present)

Awards and highlights
- Super Bowl champion (LV)

Tim Atkins (born July 19, 1979) is an American football coach who is currently the safeties coach for the Tampa Bay Buccaneers of the National Football League (NFL). He has been with the Buccaneers organization since 2019 and was promoted to assistant secondary coach in 2022 before being elevated to safeties coach in 2026. Atkins has over two decades of experience coaching at the professional and collegiate levels. Atkins helped the Buccaneers win Super Bowl LV in 2020.

== Personal life ==
Atkins was born July 19, 1979, in Ohama, Nebraska. Atkins graduated from Arizona State University in 2001, with an undergraduate degree in kinesiology.

== Coaching career ==
Atkins began his coaching career in 2001, as Hamilton High School's assistant defensive backs coach. Atkins became Whittier College's safeties coach and video coordinator in 2004 and was promoted to wide receivers coach in 2005. Atkins's last college team he coached for was in 2009, when he was a graduate assistant and defensive quality control coach at Florida Atlantic University.

=== Miami Dolphins (2006–2007) ===
Aitkins was hired in 2006 by the Miami Dolphins originally as a staff assistant. The Dolphins brought him back as a defensive assistant. After the hiring of Bill Parcells in 2007 as the Dolphins Executive VP, lower-level assistants of Cam Cameron were not retained after he was fired. Aitkins took a job with Florida Atlantic the next season.

=== Buffalo Bills (2011–2012) ===
On June 16, 2011, the Bills hired Atkins as a defensive assistant under head coach Chan Gailey.

=== Cleveland Browns (2014–2015) ===
In 2014, the Browns hired Tim Atkins as a defensive assistant under head coach Mike Pettine; following his firing in 2015, Atkins was not brought back.

=== New York Jets (2016-2018) ===
In 2016, Atkins was hired by the New York Jets as a defensive support staff under head coach Todd Bowles.

=== Tampa Bay Buccaneers (2019–present) ===
Atkins joined the Tampa Bay Buccaneers in 2019 as their defensive quality control coach. Atkins worked closely with veteran secondary coaches and played a role in the development of Tampa Bay's defensive backs. During his tenure, the Buccaneers won Super Bowl LV. Atkins was later promoted to assistant secondary coach in 2025.

On February 6, 2026, Atkins was promoted to safeties coach as part of a restructuring of head coach Todd Bowles' defensive staff.
