= Lawrence Thomas (American football) =

American football player (born 1993)

No. 97, 44
- Position: Fullback

Personal information
- Born: April 16, 1993 (age 33); Detroit, Michigan, U.S.
- Listed height: 6 ft 3 in (1.91 m)
- Listed weight: 286 lb (130 kg)

Career information
- High school: Renaissance (Detroit)
- College: Michigan State
- NFL draft: 2016: undrafted

Career history
- New York Jets (2016–2017)

Career NFL statistics
- Rushing yards: 1
- Average: 0.5
- Rushing touchdowns: 0
- Receptions: 6
- Receiving yards: 43
- Receiving touchdowns: 0
- Stats at Pro Football Reference

Lawrence Dikarri Thomas (born April 16, 1993) is an American former professional football player who was a fullback for the New York Jets of the National Football League (NFL). He played college football for the Michigan State Spartans and signed with the Jets as an undrafted free agent in 2016.

== Early life ==
Thomas was selected and participated in the 2011 Under Armour All-America Game in St. Petersburg, Florida. Thomas was named high school finalist for the 2010 Butkus Award. Thomas was ranked 3rd among the country's top defensive ends by 247Sports.com and was ranked 7th defensive end prospect by Scout.com.

== Professional career ==
=== New York Jets ===
On April 30, 2016, Thomas signed with the New York Jets as an undrafted free agent following the conclusion of the 2016 NFL draft. He was placed on injured reserve with a shoulder injury on September 29, 2016. He finished his rookie season with four tackles in three games played.

On September 2, 2017, Thomas was waived by the Jets and was later re-signed to the practice squad. He was promoted to the active roster on September 16, 2017. Upon being added to the active roster, Thomas changed his jersey number to 44 to be eligible to play fullback.

On September 8, 2018, Thomas was waived by the Jets.
