= Ross Martin (American football) =

American football player (born 1993)

Profile
- Position: Placekicker

Personal information
- Born: July 3, 1993 (age 33); Solon, Ohio, U.S.
- Listed height: 5 ft 9 in (1.75 m)
- Listed weight: 183 lb (83 kg)

Career information
- High school: Walsh Jesuit (Cuyahoga Falls, Ohio)
- College: Duke
- NFL draft: 2016: undrafted

Career history
- New York Jets (2016–2017)*; Cleveland Browns (2018)*
- * Offseason or practice squad member only

Awards and highlights
- 4× All-ACC (2012-2015)
- Stats at Pro Football Reference

Ross Martin (born July 3, 1993) is an American former professional football player who was a placekicker in the National Football League (NFL). He played college football for the Duke Blue Devils and holds a school record for most field goals (78), extra points (196), and total points (430). Martin made 83% of his collegiate field goal attempts.

== College career ==
=== 2012 ===
At the end of the 2012 season, Martin totaled 106 points on 20-of-23 (.870) field goals and 46-of-47 (.979) PATs. Martin kicked a career-high 4 field goals, and scored a career-high 14 points against North Carolina. Martin kicked a season-high 6 PATs against North Carolina Central.

=== 2013 ===
At the end of the 2013 season, Martin totaled 97 points on 13-of-19 (68.4%) field goals and 58-of-58 PATs. Martin kicked a career-high 7 PATs against Pittsburgh. Martin scored a season-high 12 points against Miami.

=== 2014 ===
At the end of the 2014 season, Martin compiled 107 points on 19-of-21 (90.5%) field goals and 50-of-50 PATs. In the ACC, Martin ranked first in field goal percentage, and tied for first in PAT percentage. Martin kicked a season-high 7 PATs against Elon. Martin scored a season-high 11 points against Kansas. Martin kicked a season-high 3 field goals against Virginia Tech.

=== 2015 ===
At the end of the 2015 season, Martin totaled 120 points on 26-of-30 (86.7%) field goals and 42-of-42 PATs. Martin kicked a season-high 7 PATs against North Carolina Central. Martin scored a season-high 14 points against Army. Martin kicked a season-high 3 field goals against Tulane.

== Professional career ==
=== New York Jets ===
On April 30, 2016, after going undrafted in the 2016 NFL draft, Martin signed with the New York Jets. He was released on August 28, 2016. He signed a reserve/future contract with the Jets on January 4, 2017.

On September 1, 2017, Martin was waived by the Jets.

=== Cleveland Browns ===
On June 14, 2018, Martin signed with the Cleveland Browns. He was released on August 28, 2018.
