= 2018 New York Jets season =

2018 season of NFL team New York Jets

- Owner: Woody & Christopher Johnson
- General manager: Mike Maccagnan
- Head coach: Todd Bowles
- Home stadium: MetLife Stadium

Results
- Record: 4–12
- Division place: 4th AFC East
- Playoffs: Did not qualify
- Pro Bowlers: S Jamal Adams; K Jason Myers; KR Andre Roberts

Uniform
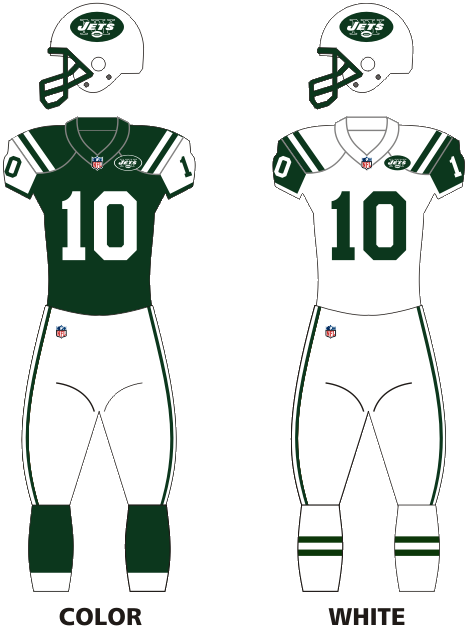

The 2018 season was the New York Jets' 49th in the National Football League (NFL), their 59th overall and their fourth and final under head coach Todd Bowles. Despite starting 3–3, they lost 9 of their last 10 games. In Week 3, the Jets lost to the Browns by a score of 21–17, becoming the first team to lose to the Browns since the Chargers lost 20–17 on Christmas Eve 2016. The win by the Browns ended a 19-game winless streak. Week 6 marked the first season the Jets have scored 40+ points in multiple games since the 2008 season. They were officially mathematically eliminated from playoff contention for the 8th consecutive season after the Titans defeated the Jaguars 30–9 in Week 14. The Jets failed to improve on their 5–11 record from the previous season with a 38–3 blowout loss in Week 17 to the New England Patriots, finishing at last place in the AFC East with a 4–12 record. Following the season finale, the Jets fired Bowles.

== Draft ==
2018 New York Jets draft
Round	Pick	Player	Position	College	Notes
1	3	Sam Darnold *	Quarterback	USC	From Indianapolis
3	72	Nathan Shepherd	Defensive tackle	Fort Hays State	
4	107	Chris Herndon	Tight end	Miami (FL)	
6	179	Parry Nickerson	Cornerback	Tulane	
6	180	Folorunso Fatukasi	Defensive end	UConn	From Tampa via Minnesota
6	204	Trenton Cannon	Running back	Virginia St.	From Minnesota
Made roster * Made at least one Pro Bowl during career

Draft trades

- The Jets traded their first-round selection (6th overall), two second-round selections (37th and 49th overall) and a second-round selection in 2019 to Indianapolis in exchange for Indianapolis's first-round selection (3rd overall).
- The Jets traded their seventh-round selection (226th overall) and defensive end Sheldon Richardson to Seattle in exchange for Seattle's second- and seventh-round selections (49th and 235th overall) and wide receiver Jermaine Kearse.
- The Jets traded their fifth-round selection (143rd overall) to San Francisco in exchange for cornerback Rashard Robinson.
- The Jets traded their sixth-round selection in 2017 (191st overall) to Dallas in exchange for Dallas's fifth-round selection (157th overall).

== Staff ==
2018 New York Jets staff
Front office: Owner – Woody Johnson; Chairman/CEO – Christopher Johnson; President – Neil Glat; General manager – Mike Maccagnan; Director of football administration – Jacqueline Davidson; Director of player personnel – Brian Heimerdinger; Director of college scouting – Matt Bazirgan; Head coaches: Head coach – Todd Bowles; Assistant head coach/inside linebackers – Mike Caldwell; Offensive coaches: Offensive coordinator/quarterbacks – Jeremy Bates; Running backs – Stump Mitchell; Wide receivers – Karl Dorrell; Tight ends – Jimmie Johnson; Offensive line/run game coordinator – Rick Dennison; Assistant offensive line – David Diaz-Infante; Offensive assistant/assistant quarterbacks – Mick Lombardi; Offensive assistant – Jason Vrable	Defensive coaches: Defensive coordinator – Kacy Rodgers; Defensive line – Robert Nunn; Assistant defensive line – La'Roi Glover; Outside linebackers – Kevin Greene; Defensive backs – Dennard Wilson; Assistant defensive backs – Steve Jackson; Defensive assistant – Robby Brown; Defensive quality control – Tim Atkins; Special teams coaches: Special teams coordinator – Brant Boyer; Special teams assistant – Jeff Hammerschmidt; Strength and conditioning: Head strength and conditioning – Justus Galac; Assistant strength and conditioning – Aaron McLaurin; Assistant strength and conditioning – Joe Giacobbe

== Final roster ==
2018 New York Jets roster
Quarterbacks (QB): 14 Sam Darnold; 15 Josh McCown; 5 Davis Webb; Running backs (RB): 40 Trenton Cannon; 35 De'Angelo Henderson; 25 Elijah McGuire; Wide receivers (WR): 11 Robby Anderson; 18 Deontay Burnett; 84 J. J. Jones; 10 Jermaine Kearse; 17 Charone Peake; 19 Andre Roberts; Tight ends (TE): 89 Chris Herndon; 86 Jordan Leggett; 87 Clive Walford	Offensive linemen (OL): 68 Kelvin Beachum T; 69 Ben Braden G; 70 Dakota Dozier G; 78 Jonotthan Harrison C; 61 Spencer Long C; 79 Brent Qvale T; 65 Eric Smith T; 67 Brian Winters G; Defensive linemen (DL): 96 Henry Anderson DE; 94 Folorunso Fatukasi DE; 99 Steve McLendon NT; 98 Mike Pennel NT; 97 Nathan Shepherd DE; 75 Destiny Vaeao DE; 92 Leonard Williams DE	Linebackers (LB): 93 Tarell Basham OLB; 51 Brandon Copeland OLB; 46 Neville Hewitt ILB; 48 Jordan Jenkins OLB; 91 Bronson Kaufusi OLB; 57 Emmanuel Lamur OLB; 50 Frankie Luvu OLB; 54 Avery Williamson ILB; 52 Anthony Wint ILB; Defensive backs (DB): 33 Jamal Adams SS; 23 Terrence Brooks SS; 38 Brandon Bryant FS; 34 Jeremy Clark CB; 22 Trumaine Johnson CB; 31 Derrick Jones CB; 45 Rontez Miles FS; 43 Parry Nickerson CB; 27 Darryl Roberts CB; 30 Rashard Robinson CB; 41 Buster Skrine CB; Special teams (ST): 4 Lac Edwards P; 42 Thomas Hennessy LS; 2 Jason Myers K	Practice squad: 44 Joel Bouagnon FB; 53 Jonathan Celestin ILB; 76 Dieugot Joseph T; 44 Harvey Langi OLB (IR); 47 Charlie Miller FS; 37 Mark Thompson RB; 64 Jon Toth C; 16 DeAngelo Yancey WR; Reserve: 55 Jeremiah Attaochu OLB (IR); 77 James Carpenter G (IR); 21 Morris Claiborne CB (IR); 20 Isaiah Crowell RB (IR); 81 Quincy Enunwa WR (IR); 71 Ben Ijalana T (IR); 58 Darron Lee ILB (Susp.); 95 Josh Martin OLB (IR); 82 Rishard Matthews WR (IR); 26 Marcus Maye FS (IR); 36 Doug Middleton FS (IR); 56 Kevin Pierre-Louis ILB (IR); 29 Bilal Powell RB (IR); 72 Brandon Shell T (IR); 85 Neal Sterling TE (IR); 83 Eric Tomlinson TE (IR); Rookies in italics 53 active, 17 reserve, 7 practice squad

== Preseason ==
Week	Date	Opponent	Result	Record	Venue	Recap
1	August 10	Atlanta Falcons	W 17–0	1–0	MetLife Stadium	Recap
2	August 16	at Washington Redskins	L 13–15	1–1	FedExField	Recap
3	August 24	New York Giants	L 16–22	1–2	MetLife Stadium	Recap
4	August 30	at Philadelphia Eagles	L 9–10	1–3	Lincoln Financial Field	Recap

== Regular season ==
=== Schedule ===
Week	Date	Opponent	Result	Record	Venue	Recap
1	September 10	at Detroit Lions	**W** 48–17	1–0	Ford Field	Recap
2	September 16	**Miami Dolphins**	**L** 12–20	1–1	MetLife Stadium	Recap
3	September 20	at Cleveland Browns	**L** 17–21	1–2	FirstEnergy Stadium	Recap
4	September 30	at Jacksonville Jaguars	**L** 12–31	1–3	TIAA Bank Field	Recap
5	October 7	Denver Broncos	**W** 34–16	2–3	MetLife Stadium	Recap
6	October 14	Indianapolis Colts	**W** 42–34	3–3	MetLife Stadium	Recap
7	October 21	Minnesota Vikings	**L** 17–37	3–4	MetLife Stadium	Recap
8	October 28	at Chicago Bears	**L** 10–24	3–5	Soldier Field	Recap
9	November 4	at **Miami Dolphins**	**L** 6–13	3–6	Hard Rock Stadium	Recap
10	November 11	**Buffalo Bills**	**L** 10–41	3–7	MetLife Stadium	Recap
11	Bye					
12	November 25	**New England Patriots**	**L** 13–27	3–8	MetLife Stadium	Recap
13	December 2	at Tennessee Titans	**L** 22–26	3–9	Nissan Stadium	Recap
14	December 9	at **Buffalo Bills**	**W** 27–23	4–9	New Era Field	Recap
15	December 15	Houston Texans	**L** 22–29	4–10	MetLife Stadium	Recap
16	December 23	Green Bay Packers	**L** 38–44 (OT)	4–11	MetLife Stadium	Recap
17	December 30	at **New England Patriots**	**L** 3–38	4–12	Gillette Stadium	Recap

Note: Intra-division opponents are in bold text.

=== Game summaries ===
==== Week 1: at Detroit Lions ====
Week One: New York Jets at Detroit Lions – Game summary

Quarter	1	2	3	4	Total
**Jets**	7	10	31	0	**48**
Lions	7	3	7	0	**17**

at Ford Field, Detroit, Michigan

- Date: September 10
- Game time: 7:10 p.m. EDT
- Game weather: Played indoors (dome stadium)
- Game attendance: 61,356
- Referee: Bill Vinovich
- TV announcers (ESPN/WPIX): Beth Mowins, Brian Griese and Laura Rutledge
- Recap, Game Book

Game information

**First quarter**

- DET – Quandre Diggs 37-yard interception return (Matt Prater kick), 14:53. Lions 7–0.
- NYJ – Isaiah Crowell 6-yard run (Jason Myers kick), 4:26. Tied 7–7. **Drive: 5 plays, 32 yards, 2:34.**

**Second quarter**

- NYJ – Jason Myers 35-yard field goal, 15:00. Jets 10–7. **Drive: 8 plays, 32 yards, 4:08.**
- NYJ – Robby Anderson 41-yard pass from Sam Darnold (Jason Myers kick), 2:00. Jets 17–7. **Drive: 3 plays, 49 yards, 1:22.**
- DET – Matt Prater 21-yard field goal, 0:15. Jets 17–10. **Drive: 10 plays, 72 yards, 1:40.**

**Third quarter**

- DET – Golden Tate 24-yard pass from Matthew Stafford (Matt Prater kick), 13:17. Tied 17–17. **Drive: 4 plays, 75 yards, 1:50.**
- NYJ – Quincy Enunwa 21-yard pass from Sam Darnold (Jason Myers kick), 9:44. Jets 24–17. **Drive: 6 plays, 75 yards, 3:34.**
- NYJ – Darron Lee 36-yard interception return (Jason Myers kick), 8:16. Jets 31–17.
- NYJ – Andre Roberts 78-yard punt return (Jason Myers kick), 7:20. Jets 38–17.
- NYJ – Jason Myers 32-yard field goal, 5:19. Jets 41–17. **Drive: 4 plays, 4 yards, 1:32.**
- NYJ – Isaiah Crowell 62-yard run (Jason Myers kick), 1:04. Jets 48–17. **Drive: 2 plays, 66 yards, 0:52.**

**Fourth quarter**

- No scoring plays.

**Top passers**

- NYJ – Sam Darnold – 16/21, 198 yards, 2 TD, INT
- DET – Matthew Stafford – 27/46, 286 yards, TD, 4 INT

**Top rushers**

- NYJ – Isaiah Crowell – 10 rushes, 102 yards, 2 TD
- DET – Theo Riddick – 4 rushes, 20 yards

**Top receivers**

- NYJ – Quincy Enunwa – 6 receptions, 63 yards, TD
- DET – Kenny Golladay – 7 receptions, 114 yards

In their first game of the season, the Jets overcame a nightmarish start by outscoring the Lions 48-10 after Sam Darnold threw a pick 6 on his first career pass.

==== Week 2: vs. Miami Dolphins ====
Week Two: Miami Dolphins at New York Jets – Game summary

Quarter	1	2	3	4	Total
**Dolphins**	7	13	0	0	**20**
Jets	0	0	6	6	**12**

at MetLife Stadium, East Rutherford, New Jersey

- Date: September 16
- Game time: 1:00 p.m. EDT
- Game weather: 80 °F (27 °C), sunny
- Game attendance: 77,982
- Referee: Brad Allen
- TV announcers (CBS): Kevin Harlan, Rich Gannon and Steve Tasker
- Recap, Game Book

Game information

**First quarter**

- MIA – Kenyan Drake 6-yard run (Jason Sanders kick), 1:16. Dolphins 7-0. **Drive: 3 plays, 15 yards, 1:29.**

**Second quarter**

- MIA – Albert Wilson 29-yard pass from Ryan Tannehill (Jason Sanders kick), 4:19. Dolphins 14–0. **Drive: 2 plays, 49 yards, 0:46.**
- MIA – A. J. Derby 19-yard pass from Ryan Tannehill (kick failed), 0:46. Dolphins 20–0. **Drive: 8 plays, 62 yards, 1:47.**

**Third quarter**

- NYJ – Bilal Powell 28-yard pass from Sam Darnold (kick failed), 11:58. Dolphins 20–6. **Drive: 7 plays, 75 yards, 3:09.**

**Fourth quarter**

- NYJ – Jason Myers 55-yard field goal, 10:11. Dolphins 20–9. **Drive: 11 plays, 22 yards, 6:14.**
- NYJ – Jason Myers 41-yard field goal, 6:00. Dolphins 20–12. **Drive: 10 plays, 63 yards, 3:05.**

**Top passers**

- MIA – Ryan Tannehill – 17/23, 168 yards, 2 TD
- NYJ – Sam Darnold – 25/41, 334 yards, TD, 2 INT

**Top rushers**

- MIA – Kenyan Drake – 11 rushes, 53 yards, TD
- NYJ – Isaiah Crowell – 12 rushes, 35 yards

**Top receivers**

- MIA – Albert Wilson – 3 receptions, 37 yards, TD
- NYJ – Quincy Enunwa – 7 receptions, 92 yards

==== Week 3: at Cleveland Browns ====
Week Three: New York Jets at Cleveland Browns – Game summary

Quarter	1	2	3	4	Total
Jets	0	14	0	3	**17**
**Browns**	0	3	11	7	**21**

at FirstEnergy Stadium, Cleveland, Ohio

- Date: September 20
- Game time: 8:20 p.m. EDT
- Game weather: 83 °F (28 °C), clear
- Game attendance: 67,431
- Referee: Jerome Boger
- TV announcers (NFLN/WNBC): Joe Buck, Troy Aikman, Erin Andrews and Kristina Pink
- Recap, Game Book

Game information

**First quarter**

- No scoring plays.

**Second quarter**

- NYJ – Isaiah Crowell 7-yard run (Jason Myers kick), 14:56. Jets 7–0. **Drive: 5 plays, 28 yards, 2:17.**
- NYJ – Isaiah Crowell 2-yard run (Jason Myers kick), 7:54. Jets 14–0. **Drive: 10 plays, 63 yards, 5:37.**
- CLE – Greg Joseph 45-yard field goal, 0:27. Jets 14–3. **Drive: 6 plays, 39 yards, 1:19.**

**Third quarter**

- CLE – Greg Joseph 27-yard field goal, 5:24. Jets 14–6. **Drive: 4 plays, 0 yards, 0:55.**
- CLE – Carlos Hyde 1-yard run (Jarvis Landry pass to Baker Mayfield for two-point conversion), 0:47. Tied 14–14. **Drive: 7 plays, 69 yards, 2:49.**

**Fourth quarter**

- NYJ – Jason Myers 28-yard field goal, 8:58. Jets 17–14. **Drive: 12 plays, 65 yards, 6:44.**
- CLE – Carlos Hyde 1-yard run (Greg Joseph kick), 2:04. Browns 21–17. **Drive: 15 plays, 75 yards, 6:52.**

**Top passers**

- NYJ – Sam Darnold – 15/31, 169 yards, INT
- CLE – Baker Mayfield – 17/23, 201 yards

**Top rushers**

- NYJ – Bilal Powell – 14 rushes, 73 yards
- CLE – Carlos Hyde – 23 rushes, 98 yards, 2 TD

**Top receivers**

- NYJ – Quincy Enunwa – 4 receptions, 57 yards
- CLE – Jarvis Landry – 8 receptions, 103 yards

With the loss, the Jets fell to 1-2 and ended the Browns 19-game winless streak.

==== Week 4: at Jacksonville Jaguars ====
Week Four: New York Jets at Jacksonville Jaguars – Game summary

Quarter	1	2	3	4	Total
Jets	0	0	3	9	**12**
**Jaguars**	3	13	9	6	**31**

at TIAA Bank Field, Jacksonville, Florida

- Date: September 30
- Game time: 1:00 p.m. EDT
- Game weather: 86 °F (30 °C), partly cloudy
- Game attendance: 65,353
- Referee: Clay Martin
- TV announcers (Fox): Dan Hellie, Jeff Fisher and Karyn Bryant
- Recap, Game Book

Game information

**First quarter**

- JAX – Josh Lambo 32-yard field goal, 3:41. Jaguars 3–0. **Drive: 15 plays, 80 yards, 8:38.**

**Second quarter**

- JAX – Josh Lambo 22-yard field goal, 9:25. Jaguars 6–0. **Drive: 12 plays, 73 yards, 6:59.**
- JAX – T.J. Yeldon 31-yard pass from Blake Bortles (Josh Lambo kick), 1:47. Jaguars 13–0. **Drive: 7 plays, 78 yards, 2:59.**
- JAX – Josh Lambo 54-yard field goal, 0:29. Jaguars 16–0. **Drive: 5 plays, 29 yards, 0:31.**

**Third quarter**

- JAX – Isaiah Crowell tackled in the end zone for safety, 12:22. Jaguars 18–0.
- NYJ – Jason Myers 27-yard field goal, 4:58. Jaguars 18–3. **Drive: 7 plays, 14 yards, 2:00.**
- JAX – Donte Moncrief 67-yard pass from Blake Bortles (Josh Lambo kick), 3:40. Jaguars 25–3. **Drive: 3 plays, 75 yards, 1:18.**

**Fourth quarter'**

- NYJ – Jason Myers 38-yard field goal, 12:53. Jaguars 25–6. **Drive: 7 plays, 50 yards, 2:40.**
- NYJ – Jordan Leggett 2-yard pass from Sam Darnold (pass failed), 11:18. Jaguars 25–12. **Drive: 3 plays, 5 yards, 1:26.**
- JAX – T.J. Yeldon 1-yard run (pass failed), 0:25. Jaguars 31–12. **Drive: 9 plays, 65 yards, 3:57.**

**Top passers**

- NYJ – Sam Darnold – 17/34, 167 yards, TD
- JAX – Blake Bortles – 29/38, 388 yards, 2 TD, INT

**Top rushers**

- NYJ – Bilal Powell – 8 rushes, 26 yards
- JAX – T.J. Yeldon – 18 rushes, 52 yards, TD

**Top receivers**

- NYJ – Quincy Enunwa – 4 receptions, 66 yards
- JAX – Dede Westbrook – 9 receptions, 130 yards

==== Week 5: vs. Denver Broncos ====
Week Five: Denver Broncos at New York Jets – Game summary

Quarter	1	2	3	4	Total
Broncos	7	3	0	6	**16**
**Jets**	0	21	3	10	**34**

at MetLife Stadium, East Rutherford, New Jersey

- Date: October 7
- Game time: 1:00 p.m. EDT
- Game weather: 77 °F (25 °C), cloudy
- Game attendance: 77,982
- Referee: Pete Morelli
- TV announcers (CBS): Ian Eagle, Dan Fouts and Evan Washburn
- Recap, Game Book

Game information

**First quarter**

- DEN – Courtland Sutton 8-yard pass from Case Keenum (Brandon McManus kick), 9:19. Broncos 7–0. **Drive: 3 plays, 20 yards, 1:15.**

**Second quarter**

- NYJ – Isaiah Crowell 77-yard run (Jason Myers kick), 13:57. Tied 7–7. **Drive: 1 play, 77 yards, 0:12.**
- NYJ – Robby Anderson 76-yard pass from Sam Darnold (Jason Myers kick), 10:46. Jets 14–7. **Drive: 3 plays, 76 yards, 0:50.**
- DEN – Brandon McManus 30-yard field goal, 3:58. Jets 14–10. **Drive: 11 plays, 79 yards, 4:04.**
- NYJ – Robby Anderson 35-yard pass from Sam Darnold (Jason Myers kick), 1:13. Jets 21–10. **Drive: 8 plays, 75 yards, 2:45.**

**Third quarter**

- NYJ – Jason Myers 49-yard field goal, 4:52. Jets 24–10. **Drive: 13 plays, 64 yards, 6:34.**

**Fourth quarter**

- NYJ – Jason Myers 30-yard field goal, 12:59. Jets 27–10. **Drive: 4 plays, –1 yard, 2:01.**
- NYJ – Terrelle Pryor 20-yard pass from Sam Darnold, 5:10. Jets 34–10. **Drive: 6 plays, 93 yards, 3:54.**
- DEN – Demaryius Thomas 42-yard pass from Case Keenum (pass failed), 3:18. Jets 34–17. **Drive: 7 plays, 75 yards, 1:52.**

**Top passers**

- DEN – Case Keenum – 35/51, 377 yards, 2 TD, INT
- NYJ – Sam Darnold – 10/22, 198 yards, 3 TD, INT

**Top rushers**

- DEN – Phillip Lindsay – 12 rushes, 61 yards
- NYJ – Isaiah Crowell – 15 rushes, 219 yards, TD

**Top receivers**

- DEN – Demaryius Thomas – 5 receptions, 105 yards, TD
- NYJ – Robby Anderson – 3 receptions, 123 yards, 2 TD

==== Week 6: vs. Indianapolis Colts ====
Week Six: Indianapolis Colts at New York Jets – Game summary

Quarter	1	2	3	4	Total
Colts	7	6	7	14	**34**
**Jets**	10	13	10	9	**42**

at MetLife Stadium, East Rutherford, New Jersey

- Date: October 14
- Game time: 1:00 p.m. EDT
- Game weather: 60 °F (16 °C), cloudy
- Game attendance: 77,982
- Referee: Alex Kemp
- TV announcers (CBS): Greg Gumbel, Trent Green, Bruce Arians and Melanie Collins
- Recap, Game Book

Game information

**First quarter**

- NYJ – Morris Claiborne 17-yard interception return (Jason Myers kick), 14:48. Jets 7–0.
- IND – Marcus Johnson 34-yard pass from Andrew Luck (Adam Vinatieri kick), 12:16. Tied 7–7. **Drive: 5 plays, 75 yards, 2:32.**
- NYJ – Jason Myers 30-yard field goal, 4:33. Jets 10–7. **Drive: 13 plays, 69 yards, 7:43.**

**Second quarter**

- IND – Adam Vinatieri 21-yard field goal, 13:25. Tied 10–10. **Drive: 8 plays, 32 yards, 2:22.**
- IND – Adam Vinatieri 31-yard field goal, 11:24. Colts 13–10. **Drive: 6 plays, 28 yards, 1:51.**
- NYJ – Terrelle Pryor 7-yard pass from Sam Darnold (Jason Myers kick), 2:32. Jets 17–13. **Drive: 8 plays, 43 yards, 4:47.**
- NYJ – Jason Myers 48-yard field goal, 1:25. Jets 20–13. **Drive: 4 plays, -3 yards, 0:29.**
- NYJ – Jason Myers 32-yard field goal, 0:00. Jets 23–13. **Drive: 6 plays, 58 yards, 0:42.**

**Third quarter**

- NYJ – Chris Herndon 32-yard pass from Sam Darnold (Jason Myers kick), 12:03. Jets 30–13. **Drive: 5 plays, 72 yards, 2:57.**
- IND – Eric Ebron 18-yard pass from Andrew Luck (Adam Vinatieri kick), 8:44. Jets 30–20. **Drive: 6 plays, 75 yards, 3:19.**
- NYJ – Jason Myers 37-yard field goal, 3:53. Jets 33–20. **Drive: 9 plays, 56 yards, 4:51.**

**Fourth quarter**

- IND – Erik Swoope 2-yard pass from Andrew Luck (Adam Vinatieri kick), 14:52. Jets 33–27. **Drive: 13 plays, 75 yards, 4:01.**
- NYJ – Jason Myers 45-yard field goal, 9:40. Jets 36–27. **Drive: 10 plays, 48 yards, 5:12.**
- NYJ – Jason Myers 37-yard field goal, 5:55. Jets 39–27. **Drive: 4 plays, 6 yards, 2:04.**
- NYJ – Jason Myers 45-yard field goal, 3:19. Jets 42–27. **Drive: 6 plays, 4 yards, 1:58.**
- IND – Chester Rogers 17-yard pass from Andrew Luck (Adam Vinatieri kick), 1:51. Jets 42–34. **Drive: 8 plays, 63 yards, 1:28.**

**Top passers**

- IND – Andrew Luck - 23/43, 301 yards, 4 TD, 3 INT
- NYJ – Sam Darnold - 24/30, 280 yards, 2 TD, INT

**Top rushers**

- IND – Marlon Mack - 11 rushes, 89 yards
- NYJ – Bilal Powell - 16 rushes, 59 yards

**Top receivers**

- IND – Eric Ebron - 4 receptions, 71 yards, TD
- NYJ – Jermaine Kearse - 9 receptions, 94 yards

==== Week 7: vs. Minnesota Vikings ====
Week Seven: Minnesota Vikings at New York Jets – Game summary

Quarter	1	2	3	4	Total
**Vikings**	7	3	10	17	**37**
Jets	7	0	3	7	**17**

at MetLife Stadium, East Rutherford, New Jersey

- Date: October 21
- Game time: 1:00 p.m. EDT
- Game weather: 46 °F (8 °C), cloudy
- Game attendance: 77,982
- Referee: Shawn Smith
- TV announcers (Fox): Thom Brennaman, Chris Spielman and Shannon Spake
- Recap, Game Book

Game information

**First quarter**

- MIN – Adam Thielen 34-yard pass from Kirk Cousins (Dan Bailey kick), 13:22. Vikings 7–0. **Drive: 4 plays, 68 yards, 1:38.**
- NYJ – Chris Herndon 12-yard pass from Sam Darnold (Jason Myers kick), 1:01. Vikings 7–7. **Drive: 6 plays, 86 yards, 3:26.**

**Second quarter**

- MIN – Dan Bailey 26-yard field goal, 10:13. Vikings 10–7. **Drive: 8 plays, 27 yards, 2:50.**

**Third quarter**

- MIN – Latavius Murray 11-yard run (Dan Bailey kick), 8:15. Vikings 17–7. **Drive: 9 plays, 64 yards, 5:06.**
- MIN – Dan Bailey 22-yard field goal, 5:49. Vikings 20–7. **Drive: 4 plays, 5 yards, 2:06.**
- NYJ – Jason Myers 55-yard field goal, 2:39. Vikings 20–10. **Drive: 7 plays, 9 yards, 3:10.**

**Fourth quarter**

- MIN – Latavius Murray 38-yard run (Dan Bailey kick), 13:38. Vikings 27–10. **Drive: 2 plays, 51 yards, 1:08.**
- NYJ – Sam Darnold 1-yard run (Jason Myers kick), 10:27. Vikings 27–17. **Drive: 9 plays, 59 yards, 3:11.**
- MIN – Aldrick Robinson 34-yard pass from Kirk Cousins (Dan Bailey kick), 5:16. Vikings 34–17. **Drive: 7 plays, 61 yards, 3:17.**
- MIN – Dan Bailey 43-yard field goal, 3:22. Vikings 37–17. **Drive: 4 plays, −3 yards, 1:07.**

**Top passers**

- MIN – Kirk Cousins – 25/40, 241 yards, 2 TD
- NYJ – Sam Darnold – 17/42, 206 yards, TD, 3 INT

**Top rushers**

- MIN – Latavius Murray – 15 rushes, 69 yards, 2 TD
- NYJ – Isaiah Crowell – 11 rushes, 29 yards

**Top receivers**

- MIN – Adam Thielen – 9 receptions, 110 yards, TD
- NYJ – Trenton Cannon – 4 receptions, 69 yards

The Jets recorded their first-ever home loss to the Vikings, ending a five-game home winning streak against them.

==== Week 8: at Chicago Bears ====
Week Eight: New York Jets at Chicago Bears – Game summary

Quarter	1	2	3	4	Total
Jets	0	3	0	7	**10**
**Bears**	7	0	7	10	**24**

at Soldier Field, Chicago, Illinois

- Date: October 28
- Game time: 1:00 p.m. EDT/12:00 p.m. CDT
- Game weather: 48 °F (9 °C), cloudy
- Game attendance: 61,397
- Referee: Clete Blakeman
- TV announcers (CBS): Jim Nantz, Tony Romo and Tracy Wolfson
- Recap, Game Book

Game information

**First quarter**

- CHI – Tarik Cohen 70-yard pass from Mitchell Trubisky (Cody Parkey kick), 5:24. Bears 7–0. **Drive: 3 plays, 88 yards, 0:56.**

**Second quarter**

- NYJ – Jason Myers 42-yard field goal, 11:59. Bears 7–3. **Drive: 14 plays, 51 yards, 8:25.**

**Third quarter**

- CHI – Anthony Miller 4-yard pass from Mitchell Trubisky (Cody Parkey kick), 7:13. Bears 14–3. **Drive: 9 plays, 55 yards, 3:41.**

**Fourth quarter**

- CHI – Cody Parkey 32-yard field goal, 14:56. Bears 17–3. **Drive: 10 plays, 36 yards, 5:32.**
- NYJ – Chris Herndon 16-yard pass from Sam Darnold (Jason Myers kick), 11:10. Bears 17–10. **Drive: 8 plays, 75 yards, 3:46.**
- CHI – Jordan Howard 2-yard run (Cody Parkey kick), 7:08. Bears 24–10. **Drive: 8 plays, 79 yards, 4:02.**

**Top passers**

- NYJ – Sam Darnold – 14/29, 153 yards, TD
- CHI – Mitchell Trubisky – 16/29, 220 yards, 2 TD

**Top rushers**

- NYJ – Isaiah Crowell – 13 rushes, 25 yards, TD
- CHI – Jordan Howard – 22 rushes, 81 yards, TD

**Top receivers**

- NYJ – Deontay Burnett – 4 receptions, 61 yards
- CHI – Taylor Gabriel – 4 receptions, 52 yards

==== Week 9: at Miami Dolphins ====
Week Nine: New York Jets at Miami Dolphins – Game summary

Quarter	1	2	3	4	Total
Jets	0	3	0	3	**6**
**Dolphins**	0	6	0	7	**13**

at Hard Rock Stadium, Miami Gardens, Florida

- Date: November 4
- Game time: 1:00 p.m. EST
- Game weather: 87 °F (31 °C), partly sunny
- Game attendance: 65,533
- Referee: Walt Coleman
- TV announcers (CBS): Andrew Catalon, James Lofton and Gene Steratore
- Recap, Game Book

Game information

**First quarter**

- No scoring plays.

**Second quarter**

- MIA – Jason Sanders 43-yard field goal, 12:39. Dolphins 3–0. **Drive: 6 plays, 18 yards, 3:15.**
- MIA – Jason Sanders 27-yard field goal, 1:11. Dolphins 6–0. **Drive: 14 plays, 51 yards, 6:03.**
- NYJ – Jason Myers 48-yard field goal, 0:20. Dolphins 6–3. **Drive: 7 plays, 45 yards, 0:51.**

**Third quarter**

- No scoring plays.

**Fourth quarter**

- MIA – Jerome Baker 25-yard interception return (Jason Sanders kick), 10:48. Dolphins 13–3.
- NYJ – Jason Myers 56-yard field goal, 5:57. Dolphins 13–6. **Drive: 9 plays, 37 yards, 4:51.**

**Top passers**

- NYJ – Sam Darnold – 21/39, 229 yards, 4 INT
- MIA – Brock Osweiler – 15/24, 139 yards

**Top rushers**

- NYJ – Isaiah Crowell – 13 rushes, 49 yards
- MIA – Frank Gore – 20 rushes, 53 yards

**Top receivers**

- NYJ – Chris Herndon – 4 receptions, 62 yards
- MIA – Danny Amendola – 5 receptions, 47 yards

==== Week 10: vs. Buffalo Bills ====
Week Ten: Buffalo Bills at New York Jets – Game summary

Quarter	1	2	3	4	Total
**Bills**	14	17	7	3	**41**
Jets	0	3	7	0	**10**

at MetLife Stadium, East Rutherford, New Jersey

- Date: November 11
- Game time: 1:00 p.m. EST
- Game weather: 46 °F (8 °C), sunny
- Game attendance: 77,982
- Referee: Ronald Torbert
- TV announcers (CBS): Andrew Catalon, James Lofton and Jay Feely
- Recap, Game Book

Game information

**First quarter**

- BUF – LeSean McCoy 28-yard run (Steven Hauschka kick), 14:20. Bills 7–0. **Drive: 2 plays, 75 yards, 0:49.**
- BUF - Jason Croom fumble recovery in NYJ end zone (Steven Hauschka kick), 2:25, Bills 14–0. **Drive: 14 plays, 73 yards, 7:17.**

**Second quarter**

- BUF – Steven Hauschka 54-yard field goal, 13:57. Bills 17–0. **Drive: 5 plays, 37 yards, 2:25.**
- BUF – Dion Dawkins 7-yard pass from Matt Barkley (Steven Hauschka kick), 8:02. Bills 24–0. **Drive: 9 plays, 64 yards, 4:54.**
- BUF – LeSean McCoy 1-yard run (Steven Hauschka kick), 0:45. Bills 31–0. **Drive: 7 plays, 54 yards, 3:13.**
- NYJ – Jason Myers 55-yard field goal, 0:02. Bills 31–3. **Drive: 6 plays, 26 yards, 0:42.**

**Third quarter**

- NYJ – Isaiah Crowell 5-yard run (Jason Myers kick), 6:37. Bills 31–10. **Drive: 7 plays, 73 yards, 3:38.**
- BUF – Zay Jones 8-yard pass from Matt Barkley (Steven Hauschka kick), 0:39. Bills 38–10. **Drive: 12 plays, 65 yards, 5:59.**

**Fourth quarter**

- BUF – Steven Hauschka 31-yard field goal, 2:47. Bills 41–10. **Drive: 9 plays, 35 yards, 5:21.**

**Top passers**

- BUF – Matt Barkley – 15/25, 232 yards, 2 TD
- NYJ – Josh McCown – 17/34, 135 yards, 2 INT

**Top rushers**

- BUF – LeSean McCoy – 26 rushes, 113 yards, 2 TD
- NYJ – Trenton Cannon – 4 rushes, 30 yards

**Top receivers**

- BUF – Robert Foster – 3 receptions, 105 yards
- NYJ – Chris Herndon – 3 receptions, 34 yards

==== Week 12: vs. New England Patriots ====
Week Twelve: New England Patriots at New York Jets – Game summary

Quarter	1	2	3	4	Total
**Patriots**	7	3	10	7	**27**
Jets	7	3	3	0	**13**

at MetLife Stadium, East Rutherford, New Jersey

- Date: November 25
- Game time: 1:00 p.m. EST
- Game weather: 54 °F (12 °C), partly cloudy
- Game attendance: 77,982
- Referee: Shawn Hochuli
- TV announcers (CBS): Ian Eagle, Dan Fouts and Evan Washburn
- Recap, Game Book

Game information

**First quarter**

- NYJ – Jermaine Kearse 16-yard pass from Josh McCown (Jason Myers kick), 4:02. Jets 7–0. **Drive: 9 plays, 80 yards, 4:05.**
- NE – Rob Gronkowski 34-yard pass from Tom Brady (Stephen Gostkowski kick), 1:11. Tied 7–7. **Drive: 5 plays, 75 yards, 2:51.**

**Second quarter**

- NE – Stephen Gostkowski 34-yard field goal, 2:27. Patriots 10–7. **Drive: 11 plays, 54 yards, 4:58.**
- NYJ – Jason Myers 55-yard field goal, 0:03. Tied 10–10. **Drive: 5 plays, 20 yards, 0:48.**

**Third quarter**

- NE – Stephen Gostkowski 32-yard field goal, 8:34. Patriots 13–10. **Drive: 15 plays, 61 yards, 6:26.**
- NYJ – Jason Myers 38-yard field goal, 4:00. Tied 13–13. **Drive: 12 plays, 55 yards, 4:34.**
- NE – Julian Edelman 21-yard pass from Tom Brady (Stephen Gostkowski kick), 1:52. Patriots 20–13. **Drive: 4 plays, 75 yards, 2:08.**

**Fourth quarter**

- NE – Sony Michel 1-yard rush (Stephen Gostkowski kick), 8:54. Patriots 27–13. **Drive: 10 plays, 80 yards, 4:29.**

**Top passers**

- NE – Tom Brady – 20/31, 283 yards, 2 TD
- NYJ – Josh McCown – 26/45, 276 yards, TD, INT

**Top rushers**

- NE – Sony Michel – 21 rushes, 133 yards, TD
- NYJ – Isaiah Crowell – 6 rushes, 30 yards

**Top receivers**

- NE – Julian Edelman – 4 receptions, 84 yards, TD
- NYJ – Jermaine Kearse – 6 receptions, 66 yards, TD

==== Week 13: at Tennessee Titans ====
Week Thirteen: New York Jets at Tennessee Titans – Game summary

Quarter	1	2	3	4	Total
Jets	10	6	6	0	**22**
**Titans**	0	6	7	13	**26**

at Nissan Stadium, Nashville, Tennessee

- Date: December 2
- Game time: 4:05 p.m. EST/3:05 p.m. CST
- Game weather: 70 °F (21 °C), sunny
- Game attendance: 60,904
- Referee: Jerome Boger
- TV announcers (CBS): Kevin Harlan, Rich Gannon and Steve Tasker
- Recap, Game Book

Game information

**First quarter**

- NYJ – Jason Myers 54-yard field goal, 9:35. Jets 3–0. **Drive: 8 plays, 25 yards, 2:43.**
- NYJ – Trumaine Johnson 31-yard interception return (Jason Myers kick), 7:59. Jets 10–0.

**Second quarter**

- NYJ – Jason Myers 34-yard field goal, 11:41. Jets 13–0. **Drive: 14 plays, 59 yards, 6:51.**
- NYJ – Jason Myers 43-yard field goal, 2:51. Jets 16–0. **Drive: 4 plays, 3 yards, 2:11.**
- TEN – Anthony Firkser 12-yard pass from Marcus Mariota (kick blocked), 0:57. Jets 16–6. **Drive: 6 plays, 68 yards, 1:54.**

**Third quarter**

- NYJ – Jason Myers 39-yard field goal, 10:39. Jets 19–6. **Drive: 6 plays, 39 yards, 2:28.**
- TEN – Derrick Henry 1-yard rush (Ryan Succop kick), 7:44. Jets 19–13. **Drive: 6 plays, 75 yards, 2:55.**
- NYJ – Jason Myers 39-yard field goal, 0:26. Jets 22–13. **Drive: 15 plays, 55 yards, 7:18.**

**Fourth quarter**

- TEN – Ryan Succop 24-yard field goal, 9:29. Jets 22–16. **Drive: 8 plays, 48 yards, 4:08.**
- TEN – Ryan Succop 33-yard field goal, 5:39. Jets 22–19. **Drive: 5 plays, 50 yards, 1:43.**
- TEN – Corey Davis 11-yard pass from Marcus Mariota (Ryan Succop kick), 0:36. Titans 26–22. **Drive: 6 plays, 86 yards, 1:10.**

**Top passers**

- NYJ – Josh McCown – 17/30, 128 yards, INT
- TEN – Marcus Mariota – 20/35, 282 yards, 2 TD, INT

**Top rushers**

- NYJ – Isaiah Crowell – 21 rushes, 98 yards
- TEN – Marcus Mariota – 4 rushes, 43 yards

**Top receivers**

- NYJ – Robby Anderson – 4 receptions, 48 yards
- TEN – Taywan Taylor – 3 receptions, 104 yards

With the loss, the Jets dropped to 3-9, and were mathematically eliminated from playoff contention for the eighth consecutive season after the Titans defeated the Jaguars the following Thursday night.

==== Week 14: at Buffalo Bills ====
Week Fourteen: New York Jets at Buffalo Bills – Game summary

Quarter	1	2	3	4	Total
**Jets**	3	10	0	14	**27**
Bills	14	3	3	3	**23**

at New Era Field, Orchard Park, New York

- Date: December 9
- Game time: 1:00 p.m. EST
- Game weather: 31 °F (−1 °C), fair
- Game attendance: 59,119
- Referee: Alex Kemp
- TV announcers (CBS): Spero Dedes, Adam Archuleta, and Otis Livingston
- Recap, Game Book

Game information

**First quarter**

- BUF – Josh Allen 6-yard rush (Steven Hauschka kick), 9:12. Bills 7–0. **Drive: 11 plays, 73 yards, 5:48.**
- NYJ – Jason Myers 47-yard field goal, 4:34. Bills 7–3. **Drive: 4 plays, 3 yards, 1:20.**
- BUF – Isaiah McKenzie 15-yard rush (Steven Hauschka kick), 1:07. Bills 14–3. **Drive: 7 plays, 75 yards, 3:27.**

**Second quarter**

- NYJ – Jason Myers 21-yard field goal, 11:10. Bills 14–6. **Drive: 10 plays, 43 yards, 4:57.**
- BUF – Steven Hauschka 31-yard field goal, 7:14. Bills 17–6. **Drive: 8 plays, 58 yards, 3:56.**
- NYJ – Trenton Cannon 4-yard rush (Jason Myers kick), 6:31. Bills 17–13. **Drive: 1 play, 8 yards, 0:43.**

**Third quarter**

- BUF – Steven Hauschka 29-yard field goal, 13:22. Bills 20–13. **Drive: 4 plays, 2 yards, 1:29.**

**Fourth quarter**

- NYJ – Robby Anderson 7-yard pass from Sam Darnold (Jason Myers kick), 12:06. Tied 20–20. **Drive: 11 plays, 85 yards, 6:02.**
- BUF – Steven Hauschka 36-yard field goal, 2:31. Bills 23–20. **Drive: 9 plays, 62 yards, 3:45.**
- NYJ – Elijah McGuire 1-yard rush (Jason Myers kick), 1:17. Jets 27–23. **Drive: 9 plays, 61 yards, 1:14.**

**Top passers**

- NYJ – Sam Darnold – 16/24, 170 yards, TD, INT
- BUF – Josh Allen – 18/36, 206 yards, 2 INT

**Top rushers**

- NYJ – Elijah McGuire – 17 rushes, 60 yards, TD
- BUF – Josh Allen – 9 rushes, 101 yards, TD

**Top receivers**

- NYJ – Robby Anderson – 4 receptions, 76 yards, TD
- BUF – Robert Foster – 7 receptions, 104 yards

==== Week 15: vs. Houston Texans ====
Week Fifteen: Houston Texans at New York Jets – Game summary

Quarter	1	2	3	4	Total
**Texans**	3	13	0	13	**29**
Jets	3	6	6	7	**22**

at MetLife Stadium, East Rutherford, New Jersey

- Date: December 15
- Game time: 4:30 p.m. EST
- Game weather: 51 °F (11 °C), cloudy
- Game attendance: 77,982
- Referee: Brad Allen
- TV announcers (NFLN): Curt Menefee, Steve Mariucci, Nate Burleson and Melissa Stark
- Recap, Game Book

Game information

**First quarter**

- HOU – Kaʻimi Fairbairn 41-yard field goal, 9:23. Texans 3–0. **Drive: 8 plays, 37 yards, 3:31.**
- NYJ – Jason Myers 26-yard field goal, 2:01. Tied 3–3. **Drive: 13 plays, 67 yards, 7:22.**

**Second quarter**

- HOU – Kaʻimi Fairbairn 32-yard field goal, 12:51. Texans 6–3. **Drive: 10 plays, 60 yards, 4:10.**
- HOU – DeAndre Hopkins 45-yard pass from Deshaun Watson (Kaʻimi Fairbairn kick), 8:14. Texans 13–3. **Drive: 2 plays, 46 yards, 0:40.**
- HOU – Kaʻimi Fairbairn 53-yard field goal, 4:35. Texans 16–3. **Drive: 5 plays, 34 yards, 2:05.**
- NYJ – Robby Anderson 5-yard pass from Sam Darnold (kick failed), 0:30. Texans 16–9. **Drive: 9 plays, 83 yards, 4:05.**

**Third quarter**

- NYJ – Andre Roberts 13-yard pass from Sam Darnold (kick failed), 8:39. Texans 16–15. **Drive: 8 plays, 60 yards, 4:10.**

**Fourth quarter**

- HOU – Kaʻimi Fairbairn 49-yard field goal, 12:33. Texans 19–15. **Drive: 8 plays, 57 yards, 3:55.**
- NYJ – Elijah McGuire 2-yard run (Jason Myers kick), 5:00. Jets 22–19. **Drive: 15 plays, 73 yards, 7:33.**
- HOU – DeAndre Hopkins 14-yard pass from Deshaun Watson (Kaʻimi Fairbairn kick), 2:15. Texans 26–22. **Drive: 7 plays, 75 yards, 2:45.**
- HOU – Kaʻimi Fairbairn 40-yard field goal, 0:54. Texans 29–22. **Drive: 4 plays, -1 yard, 0:58.**

**Top passers**

- HOU – Deshaun Watson – 22/28, 294 yards, 2 TD
- NYJ – Sam Darnold – 24/38, 253 yards, 2 TD

**Top rushers**

- HOU – Deshaun Watson – 4 rushes, 26 yards
- NYJ – Elijah McGuire – 18 rushes, 42 yards, TD

**Top receivers**

- HOU – DeAndre Hopkins – 10 receptions, 170 yards, 2 TD
- NYJ – Robby Anderson – 7 receptions, 96 yards, TD

==== Week 16: vs. Green Bay Packers ====
Week Sixteen: Green Bay Packers at New York Jets – Game summary

Quarter	1	2	3	4	OT	Total
**Packers**	0	17	3	18	6	**44**
Jets	7	14	14	3	0	**38**

at MetLife Stadium, East Rutherford, New Jersey

- Date: December 23
- Game time: 1:00 p.m. EST
- Game weather: 43 °F (6 °C), sunny
- Game attendance: 77,982
- Referee: Ronald Torbert
- TV announcers (Fox): Kenny Albert, Ronde Barber and Kristina Pink
- Recap, Game Book

Game information

First quarter

- NYJ – Elijah McGuire 4-yard run (Jason Myers kick), 2:20. Jets 7–0. **Drive: 12 plays, 83 yards, 6:39.**

Second quarter

- NYJ – Robby Anderson 33-yard pass from Sam Darnold (Jason Myers kick), 9:09. Jets 14–0. **Drive: 8 plays, 76 yards, 5:12.**
- GB – Jake Kumerow 49-yard pass from Aaron Rodgers (Mason Crosby kick), 5:14. Jets 14–7. **Drive: 6 plays, 95 yards, 3:56.**
- NYJ – Andre Roberts 99-yard kickoff return (Jason Myers kick), 5:02. Jets 21–7.
- GB – Jamaal Williams 7-yard run (Mason Crosby kick), 1:39. Jets 21–14. **Drive: 6 plays, 62 yards, 3:21.**
- GB – Mason Crosby 42-yard field goal, 0:06. Jets 21–17. **Drive: 9 plays, 32 yards, 0:52.**

Third quarter

- GB – Mason Crosby 29-yard field goal, 8:20. Jets 21–20. **Drive: 11 plays, 69 yards, 6:43.**
- NYJ – Chris Herndon 5-yard pass from Sam Darnold (Jason Myers kick), 4:25. Jets 28–20. **Drive: 7 plays, 75 yards, 3:56.**
- NYJ – Elijah McGuire 20-yard pass from Sam Darnold (Jason Myers kick), 2:58. Jets 35–20. **Drive: 2 plays, 28 yards, 1:24.**

Fourth quarter

- GB – Mason Crosby 38-yard field goal, 11:49. Jets 35–23. **Drive: 7 plays, 41 yards, 2:26.**
- GB – Aaron Rodgers 1-yard run (Mason Crosby kick), 6:37. Jets 35–30. **Drive: 8 plays, 51 yards, 3:02.**
- GB – Aaron Rodgers 1-yard run (Two-point conversion, Aaron Rodgers run), 1:16. Packers 38–35. **Drive: 11 plays, 83 yards, 2:00.**
- NYJ – Jason Myers 33-yard field goal, 0:21. Tied 38–38. **Drive: 6 plays, 23 yards, 0:55.**

Overtime

- GB – Davante Adams 16-yard pass from Aaron Rodgers, 6:28. Packers 44–38. **Drive: 8 plays, 45 yards, 3:37.**

**Top passers**

- GB – Aaron Rodgers - 37/55, 442 yards, 2 TD
- NYJ – Sam Darnold - 24/35, 341 yards, 3 TD

**Top rushers**

- GB – Jamaal Williams - 15 rushes, 95 yards, TD
- NYJ – Elijah McGuire - 14 rushes, 35 yards, TD

**Top receivers**

- GB – Equanimeous St. Brown - 5 receptions, 95 yards
- NYJ – Robby Anderson - 9 receptions, 140 yards, TD

==== Week 17: at New England Patriots ====
Week Seventeen: New York Jets at New England Patriots – Game summary

Quarter	1	2	3	4	Total
Jets	3	0	0	0	**3**
**Patriots**	7	14	7	10	**38**

at Gillette Stadium, Foxborough, Massachusetts

- Date: December 30
- Game time: 1:00 p.m. EST
- Game weather: 33 °F (1 °C), sunny and cold
- Game attendance: 65,878
- Referee: Walt Coleman
- TV announcers (CBS): Ian Eagle, Dan Fouts and Evan Washburn
- Recap, Game Book

Game information

**First quarter**

- NE – James White 17-yard pass from Tom Brady (Stephen Gostkowski kick), 5:16. Patriots 7–0. **Drive: 9 plays, 59 yards, 5:00.**
- NYJ – Jason Myers 40-yard field goal, 0:54. Patriots 7–3. **Drive: 10 plays, 56 yards, 4:22.**

**Second quarter**

- NE – Rex Burkhead 18-yard pass from Tom Brady (Stephen Gostkowski kick), 12:53. Patriots 14–3. **Drive: 7 plays, 75 yards, 3:01.**
- NE – Phillip Dorsett 9-yard pass from Tom Brady (Stephen Gostkowski kick), 11:03. Patriots 21–3. **Drive: 5 plays, 8 yards, 1:40.**

**Third quarter**

- NE – Kyle Van Noy 46-yard fumble return (Stephen Gostkowski kick), 10:48. Patriots 28–3.

**Fourth quarter**

- NE – Stephen Gostkowski 38-yard field goal, 9:40. Patriots 31–3. **Drive: 6 plays, 45 yards, 2:53.**
- NE – Julian Edelman 5-yard pass from Tom Brady (Stephen Gostkowski kick), 3:26. Patriots 38–3. **Drive: 10 plays, 64 yards, 5:06.**

**Top passers**

- NYJ – Sam Darnold – 16/28, 167 yards
- NE – Tom Brady – 24/33, 250 yards, 4 TD

**Top rushers**

- NYJ – Elijah McGuire – 18 rushes, 41 yards
- NE – Sony Michel – 14 rushes, 50 yards

**Top receivers**

- NYJ – Deontay Burnett – 5 receptions, 73 yards
- NE – Julian Edelman – 5 receptions, 69 yards, TD

=== Standings ===
==== Division ====
AFC East
	W	L	T	PCT	DIV	CONF	PF	PA	STK
^{(2)} New England Patriots	11	5	0	.688	5–1	8–4	436	325	W2
Miami Dolphins	7	9	0	.438	4–2	6–6	319	433	L3
Buffalo Bills	6	10	0	.375	2–4	4–8	269	374	W1
New York Jets	4	12	0	.250	1–5	3–9	333	441	L3

==== Conference ====
AFC
#	Team	Division	W	L	T	PCT	DIV	CONF	SOS	SOV	STK
**Division leaders**
1 (Note: Kansas City finished ahead of LA Chargers in the AFC West based on division record, claiming the No. 1 seed.)	Kansas City Chiefs	West	12	4	0	.750	5–1	10–2	.480	.401	W1
2 (Note: New England claimed the No. 2 seed over Houston based on head-to-head victory.)	New England Patriots	East	11	5	0	.688	5–1	8–4	.482	.494	W2
3	Houston Texans	South	11	5	0	.688	4–2	9–3	.471	.435	W1
4	Baltimore Ravens	North	10	6	0	.625	3–3	8–4	.496	.450	W3
**Wild Cards**
5	Los Angeles Chargers	West	12	4	0	.750	4–2	9–3	.477	.422	W1
6	Indianapolis Colts	South	10	6	0	.625	4–2	7–5	.465	.456	W4
**Did not qualify for the postseason**
7	Pittsburgh Steelers	North	9	6	1	.594	4–1–1	6–5–1	.504	.448	W1
8	Tennessee Titans	South	9	7	0	.563	3–3	5–7	.520	.465	L1
9	Cleveland Browns	North	7	8	1	.469	3–2–1	5–6–1	.516	.411	L1
10	Miami Dolphins	East	7	9	0	.438	4–2	6–6	.469	.446	L3
11 (Note: Denver finished ahead of Cincinnati and Buffalo based on strength of victory. Cincinnati finished ahead of Buffalo based on record vs. common opponents. Cincinnati's cumulative record against Baltimore, Indianapolis, the Los Angeles Chargers and Miami was 3–2, compared to Buffalo's 1–4 cumulative record against the same four teams.)	Denver Broncos	West	6	10	0	.375	2–4	4–8	.523	.464	L4
12	Cincinnati Bengals	North	6	10	0	.375	1–5	4–8	.535	.448	L2
13	Buffalo Bills	East	6	10	0	.375	2–4	4–8	.523	.411	W1
14	Jacksonville Jaguars	South	5	11	0	.313	1–5	4–8	.549	.463	L1
15 (Note: NY Jets finished ahead of Oakland based on strength of victory.)	New York Jets	East	4	12	0	.250	1–5	3–9	.506	.438	L3
16	Oakland Raiders	West	4	12	0	.250	1–5	3–9	.547	.406	L1
**Tiebreakers** (Note: When breaking ties for three or more teams under the NFL's rules, they are first broken within divisions, then comparing only the highest ranked remaining team from each division.)
