= Chris Herndon =

American football player (born 1996)

No. 89
- Position: Tight end

Personal information
- Born: February 23, 1996 (age 30); Norcross, Georgia, U.S.
- Listed height: 6 ft 4 in (1.93 m)
- Listed weight: 253 lb (115 kg)

Career information
- High school: Norcross
- College: Miami (FL) (2014–2017)
- NFL draft: 2018: 4th round, 107th overall pick

Career history
- New York Jets (2018–2020); Minnesota Vikings (2021); New Orleans Saints (2022)*
- * Offseason or practice squad member only

Awards and highlights
- PFWA All-Rookie Team (2018); Second-team All-ACC (2017)

Career NFL statistics
- Receptions: 75
- Receiving yards: 836
- Receiving touchdowns: 8
- Stats at Pro Football Reference

Christopher Herndon IV (born February 23, 1996) is an American former professional football player who was a tight end in the National Football League (NFL). He played college football for the Miami Hurricanes and was selected by the New York Jets in the fourth round of the 2018 NFL draft.

== Early life ==
Herndon was born with postaxial polydactyly and had two of his twelve fingers surgically removed shortly after birth. Herndon attended and played high school football at Norcross High School in Norcross, Georgia.

== College career ==
Herndon attended and played college football at the University of Miami from 2015 to 2017. During his collegiate career, he recorded 86 receptions for 1,048 receiving yards and seven receiving touchdowns.

=== College statistics ===
Year	School	Conf	Class	Pos	G	Rec	Yds	Avg
2015	Miami (FL)	ACC	SO	TE	10	18	237	13.2
2016	Miami (FL)	ACC	JR	TE	13	28	334	11.9
2017	Miami (FL)	ACC	SR	TE	11	40	477	11.9
Career	Miami (FL)					86	1,048	12.2

== Professional career ==
Pre-draft measurables
Height	Weight	Arm length	Hand span	20-yard shuttle	Three-cone drill	Vertical jump	Broad jump	Bench press
6 ft 3 3/4 in (1.92 m)	253 lb (115 kg)	32 7/8 in (0.84 m)	9 1/4 in (0.23 m)	4.59 s	7.38 s	34.0 in (0.86 m)	9 ft 8 in (2.95 m)	21 reps
All values from NFL Combine/Miami’s Pro Day

=== New York Jets ===
The New York Jets selected Herndon in the fourth round with the 107th overall pick in the 2018 NFL draft. Herndon was the sixth tight end drafted in 2018. On May 21, 2018, the Jets signed Herndon to a four-year, $3.17 million contract that includes a signing bonus of $711,364.

External videos
- Jets draft Chris Herndon 107th overall

Throughout training camp, Herndon competed to be the starting tight end against Eric Tomlinson, Clive Walford, Neal Sterling, and Jordan Leggett. Head coach Todd Bowles named Herndon the fourth tight end on the depth chart to begin the regular season, behind Tomlinson, Sterling, and Leggett.

He made his professional regular season debut in the Jets’ season-opening 48–17 win at the Detroit Lions. In Week 2, Herndon earned his first career start and caught his two passes for 30-yards to mark the first receptions of his career during a 20–12 loss against the Miami Dolphins. On October 14, 2018, Herndon caught two passes for 56 receiving yards and scored his first career touchdown during a 42–34 win against the Indianapolis Colts in Week 6. Herndon caught his first career touchdown reception on a 32-yard pass from fellow rookie Sam Darnold during the third quarter. In Week 12, Herndon caught a season-high seven receptions for 57-yards during a 27–13 loss against the New England Patriots. On December 23, 2018, he caught six passes for a season-high 82 receiving yards and scored a touchdown as the Jets lost 44–38 against the Green Bay Packers in Week 16. Herndon gradually became the Jets’ primary receiving tight end during the season and surpassed Neal Sterling and Jordan Leggett on the depth chart. He finished the season as the Jets second-leading receiver behind Robby Anderson with 39 receptions for 502 yards and four touchdowns. He finished first among all rookie tight ends in receptions and touchdowns and second in receiving yards. He was named to Pro Football Writers of America All-Rookie Team, becoming the fourth Jets tight end to receive this award, joining Johnny Mitchell (1992), Anthony Becht (2000), & Jace Amaro (2014).

Herndon was suspended the first four games of the 2019 season for violating the NFL's policy and program on substances of abuse. He was reinstated from suspension on October 7, 2019, and activated prior to Week 7. On November 12, 2019, Herndon was placed on injured reserve after a season ending injury.

=== Minnesota Vikings ===
On August 31, 2021, the Jets traded Herndon and a sixth-round 2022 NFL draft pick to the Minnesota Vikings for a 2022 fourth-round pick.

=== New Orleans Saints ===
On August 3, 2022, Herndon signed with the New Orleans Saints. On August 23, he was released by the Saints. Herndon was suspended for eight games on November 16.
