= J. J. Jones (wide receiver) =

American football player (born 1992)

J.J. Jones
No. 84, 89
- Positions: Wide receiver Return specialist

Personal information
- Born: December 6, 1992 (age 33); Columbus, Mississippi, U.S.
- Listed height: 5 ft 10 in (1.78 m)
- Listed weight: 173 lb (78 kg)

Career information
- High school: Noxubee County (Macon, Mississippi)
- College: West Georgia
- NFL draft: 2018: undrafted

Career history
- Los Angeles Chargers (2018); New York Jets (2018); Edmonton Eskimos (2020)

Career NFL statistics
- Receptions: 1
- Receiving yards: 3
- Return yards: 93
- Stats at Pro Football Reference

JaNardreon Quonshun "J. J." Jones, (born December 6, 1992) is an American former professional football player who was a wide receiver and return specialist in the National Football League (NFL). He played college football for the West Georgia Wolves.

== College career ==
Jones began his collegiate career at Itawamba Community College as a walk-on. He transferred to West Georgia for his final two years of collegiate eligibility. As a redshirt senior, Jones caught 24 passes for 274 yards and two touchdowns and returned 28 punts for 293 yards and a touchdown.

== Professional career ==
Pre-draft measurables
Height	Weight	Arm length	Hand span	40-yard dash	10-yard split	20-yard split	20-yard shuttle	Three-cone drill	Vertical jump	Broad jump	Bench press
5 ft 9 5/8 in (1.77 m)	175 lb (79 kg)	29 3/4 in (0.76 m)	8 1/4 in (0.21 m)	4.35 s	1.53 s	2.55 s	4.26 s	6.83 s	38.0 in (0.97 m)	10 ft 8 in (3.25 m)	5 reps
All values from Pro Day

=== Los Angeles Chargers ===
Jones was signed by the Los Angeles Chargers as undrafted free agent on May 11, 2018. Jones made the Chargers 53-man roster as the primary kick and punt returner following an impressive preseason, which included a 72-yard punt return touchdown. He made his NFL debut in the Chargers' season-opening loss to the Kansas City Chiefs. He had two kick returns for 36 net yards. He was waived by the Chargers on October 11, 2018.

=== New York Jets ===
Jones was signed to the New York Jets' practice squad on October 22, 2018. He was promoted to the active roster on December 29, 2018. Jones played in the Jets season finale against the New England Patriots and caught a three-yard pass from quarterback Sam Darnold for his first career reception. Jones played in four games during his rookie season (three with the Chargers and one with the Jets), recording 93 total return yards and one reception for three yards, as well as two fumbles.

On August 23, 2019, Jones was waived by the Jets.

=== Edmonton Eskimos ===
Jones signed with the Edmonton Eskimos on February 7, 2020.
