= Sam Darnold =

American football player (born 1997)

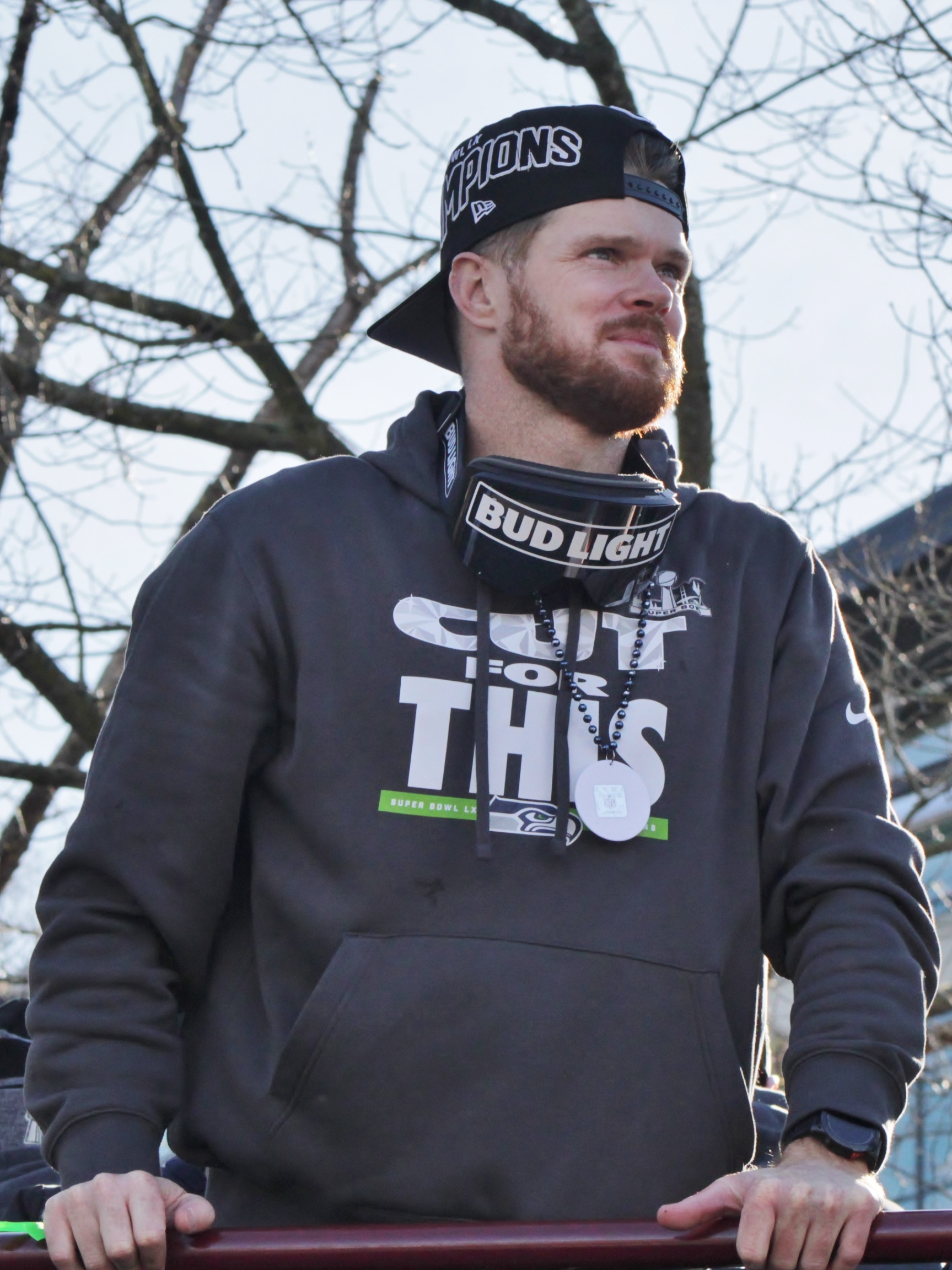
- Darnold at the Super Bowl LX parade in 2026

No. 14 – Seattle Seahawks
- Position: Quarterback
- Roster status: Active

Personal information
- Born: June 5, 1997 (age 29); Capistrano Beach, California, U.S.
- Listed height: 6 ft 3 in (1.91 m)
- Listed weight: 225 lb (102 kg)

Career information
- High school: San Clemente (San Clemente, California)
- College: USC (2015–2017)
- NFL draft: 2018: 1st round, 3rd overall pick

Career history
- New York Jets (2018–2020); Carolina Panthers (2021–2022); San Francisco 49ers (2023); Minnesota Vikings (2024); Seattle Seahawks (2025–present)

Awards and highlights
- Super Bowl champion (LX); 2× Pro Bowl (2024, 2025); First-team All-Pac-12 (2017)

Career NFL statistics as of Week 8, 2026
- Passing attempts: 3,044
- Passing completions: 1,893
- Completion percentage: 62.2%
- TD–INT: 133–91
- Passing yards: 21,909
- Passer rating: 86.0
- Rushing yards: 1,139
- Rushing touchdowns: 14
- Stats at Pro Football Reference

Samuel Richard Darnold (born June 5, 1997) is an American professional football quarterback for the Seattle Seahawks of the National Football League (NFL). He played college football for the USC Trojans and was selected third overall in the 2018 NFL draft by the New York Jets, where he spent his first three seasons. After injuries and inconsistent play, Darnold was traded to the Carolina Panthers, alternating as a starter and backup for two seasons, and then spent one season as a backup with the San Francisco 49ers.

Darnold had a breakout year in 2024 with the Minnesota Vikings when he led them to the playoffs with a 14–3 record. He joined the Seahawks the following season, leading them to a victory in Super Bowl LX. Darnold was considered a draft bust before signing with the Vikings, and his turnaround to a Super Bowl-winning starting quarterback is regarded as one of the greatest comeback stories in NFL history.

== Early life ==
Darnold was born in Capistrano Beach, California, on June 5, 1997. He attended San Clemente High School in San Clemente, California. After playing baseball as a freshman, Darnold played football and basketball. During his high school basketball career, Darnold excelled and was named South Coast League Most Valuable Player twice, along with being named to the all-CIF team. Basketball coach Marc Popovich stated Darnold's basketball skills helped translate into football, being the "only guy [I've] ever had who could get a defensive rebound and launch a 70-foot pass on target, pretty much in the same motion, to a guy breaking out in the fastbreak. It was almost Wes Unseld-like." Popovich added that Darnold could have played college basketball in the Pac-12 Conference or the Mountain West Conference "at worst".

On the football team, Darnold played wide receiver and linebacker, though he played quarterback as a sophomore after the starting quarterback was injured in a game against Tesoro High School. Darnold threw a touchdown and scored the game-winning two-point conversion, but returned to playing receiver and linebacker a week later. When he became the school's regular quarterback, Darnold set the school record for the most touchdown passes in a game with five. He missed much of his junior year with a foot injury. During Darnold's senior year, San Clemente reached the CIF-Southern Section Southwest Division championship game, where they lost 44–37 to underdog Trabuco Hills High School after Darnold suffered a concussion. He finished his senior season with 3,000 passing yards and 39 touchdowns to go along with 800 rushing yards and 13 rushing touchdowns.

Darnold was rated by Rivals.com as a four-star recruit and was ranked as the eighth best dual-threat quarterback in his class and 179th-best player overall. As Darnold sought to be recruited by colleges, he had little video footage of his performance at recruiting camps, so San Clemente head football coach Jaime Ortiz sent video of his basketball career to football coaches. Darnold received scholarship offers to play college football from Oregon, Utah, Northwestern, and Duke, but accepted the offer from USC, whose coaches Clay Helton and Steve Sarkisian were impressed by Darnold's performance at a football camp.

College recruiting
Name	Hometown	School	Height	Weight	Commit date
Sam Darnold; QB	San Clemente, California	San Clemente	6 ft 5 in (1.96 m)	215 lb (98 kg)	Jul 18, 2014
Sam Darnold; QB	Recruit ratings: Scout: Rivals: 247Sports: (83)				
Overall recruit ranking:
Note: In many cases, Scout, Rivals, 247Sports, On3, and ESPN may conflict in their listings of height and weight.; In these cases, the average was taken. ESPN grades are on a 100-point scale.; Sources: "2015 USC Football Commitment List". Rivals.; "2015 Team Ranking". Rivals.com.

== College career ==
=== 2015 season ===
USC defensive coordinator Justin Wilcox, who recruited Darnold, wanted him to play linebacker, but he declined. In the 2015 season, Darnold redshirted for his freshman year as he was behind Cody Kessler and Max Browne on the depth chart.

=== 2016 season ===
Entering the 2016 season as a redshirt freshman, Darnold was the second-string quarterback behind Max Browne. In three games as backup quarterback, Darnold saw limited action, completing 14 of 22 passes for two touchdowns and an interception. After a 1–2 start to the season, Browne was benched in favor of Darnold. In his first career start with USC against the Utah Utes, Darnold completed 18 of 26 passes for 253 yards and recorded a rushing touchdown as USC lost 31–27. After the loss, Darnold's Trojans did not lose a game for the remainder of the season, including a 26–13 upset win over the #4-ranked Washington Huskies. The USC offense recorded an average of 37 points and 518 yards per game, while Darnold set the school record for most passing touchdowns by a freshman with 26, ten more than the previous record set by Todd Marinovich in 1989. Against Arizona and California, Darnold became the first quarterback in school history to record five touchdown passes in consecutive games. On October 1, 2016, Darnold threw for 352 yards and 3 touchdowns in a 41–20 win over Arizona State. The following week, he threw for 358 yards and 3 touchdowns in a 21–17 win over Colorado on October 8. He threw for multiple touchdowns in eight straight games, the first USC quarterback to do so since Matt Leinart in 2004. On the ground, Darnold recorded 230 rushing yards, the most by a USC quarterback since Reggie Perry's 254 yards in 1991. Darnold was named the 2016 Pac-12 Freshman Offensive Player of the Year in late November.

USC was invited to play in the 2017 Rose Bowl, their first appearance in the bowl in eight seasons. In the 52–49 victory over Penn State, Darnold completed 33 of 53 passes for 453 yards, while setting Rose Bowl records in passing touchdowns (5) and total yards (473). The 453 passing yards recorded ranked second in the bowl's history, trailing Danny O'Neil's 456 in 1995.

On January 4, 2017, Darnold received the Archie Griffin Award, given annually to college football's most valuable player, an award no freshman had won. Darnold was also named to the Football Writers Association of America's Freshman All-America team.

=== 2017 season ===
Entering the 2017 season as a redshirt sophomore, Darnold became an early favorite for the Heisman Trophy, and eventually a first-round pick in the 2018 draft. The season did not start the way Darnold had expected. In six games, he had matched the number of interceptions that he had thrown the previous year. This was accredited to breaking in a new receiver group, numerous injuries, and questionable coaching decisions. Despite this, he led USC to a dominant victory over Stanford by a score of 42–24. He then led an overtime victory over the Texas Longhorns during which he drove the Trojans to a game-tying field goal in the final 39 seconds of regulation. Darnold guided USC to the Pac-12 Conference championship with a 31–28 victory over Stanford in the conference title game where he was named the game's MVP after throwing for over 300 yards and two touchdowns. The win earned USC a spot in the 2017 Cotton Bowl where, despite having 356 passing yards, the Trojans were defeated by the Ohio State Buckeyes, 24–7.

== Professional career ==
=== Pre-draft ===
On January 3, 2018, Darnold announced that he would enter the 2018 NFL draft.

Pre-draft measurables
Height	Weight	Arm length	Hand span	Wingspan	40-yard dash	10-yard split	20-yard split	20-yard shuttle	Three-cone drill	Vertical jump	Broad jump	Wonderlic
6 ft 3 3/8 in (1.91 m)	221 lb (100 kg)	31 in (0.79 m)	9 3/8 in (0.24 m)	6 ft 2 in (1.88 m)	4.85 s	1.66 s	2.81 s	4.40 s	6.96 s	26.5 in (0.67 m)	8 ft 9 in (2.67 m)	28
All values from NFL Combine

=== New York Jets ===
==== 2018 season ====
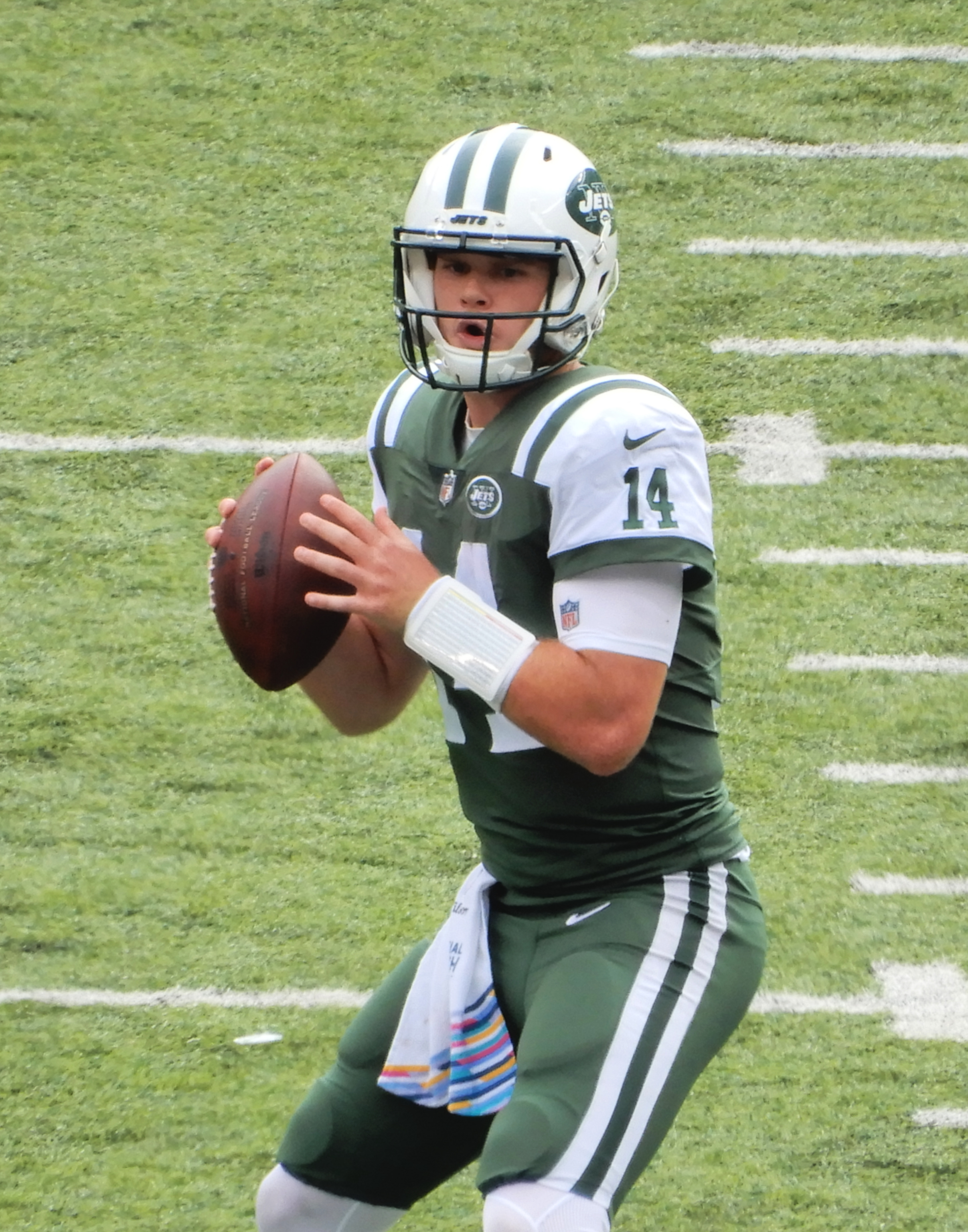
Darnold in 2018

Darnold was selected by the New York Jets in the first round (third overall) of the 2018 NFL draft. On July 30, 2018, he signed a four-year deal worth $30.25 million fully guaranteed featuring a $20 million signing bonus with the Jets.

Darnold made his professional debut in the first preseason game against the Atlanta Falcons on August 10, where he finished with 96 passing yards and a touchdown as the Jets won 17–0. On August 29, the Jets named Darnold the starter for Week 1 of the season.

Darnold played his first regular season game on September 10, 2018, during Monday Night Football against the Detroit Lions. At 21 years, 97 days old, Darnold became the youngest opening-day starting quarterback since the 1970 AFL–NFL merger. His first pass resulted in an interception returned for a touchdown by Quandre Diggs. However, he responded well and finished with 198 passing yards and two touchdowns as the Jets won 48–17. During the Jets' home opener against the Miami Dolphins in Week 2, Darnold finished with 334 passing yards, a touchdown, and two interceptions as the Jets lost 20–12. During a Thursday Night Football game against the Cleveland Browns in Week 3, Darnold finished with 169 passing yards and two interceptions as the Jets lost 21–17. During Week 4 against the Jacksonville Jaguars, Darnold finished with 167 passing yards and a touchdown as the Jets lost 31–12. During Week 5 against the Denver Broncos, Darnold finished with 198 passing yards, three touchdowns, and an interception, while the Jets combined for 323 rushing yards and won 34–16. During Week 6 against the Indianapolis Colts, Darnold finished with 280 passing yards, two touchdowns, and an interception as the Jets won 42–34. During Week 7 against the Minnesota Vikings, Darnold committed 4 turnovers, including 3 interceptions and a lost fumble. He finished with 206 passing yards and a touchdown as the Jets lost 37–17. During Week 8 against the Chicago Bears, Darnold finished with 153 passing yards and a touchdown as the Jets lost 24–10.

During a rematch against the Dolphins in Week 9, Darnold threw four interceptions, finishing the game with 229 passing yards during a 13–6 loss. Darnold suffered through a foot injury, which sidelined him and caused Josh McCown to start for the Jets. After missing three games due to a foot injury, Darnold returned to action in a Week 14 matchup against the Buffalo Bills and fellow rookie quarterback Josh Allen. Darnold temporarily left the game due to an injury on the same foot, but eventually returned, finishing with 170 passing yards, a touchdown, and an interception as the Jets ended their six-game losing streak and won 27–23. He led the team on its game-winning drive, completing a 37-yard pass to Robby Anderson to help set up a touchdown run by Elijah McGuire. During Saturday Night Football against the Houston Texans in Week 15, Darnold finished with 253 passing yards and two touchdowns as the Jets lost 29–22. During Week 16 against the Green Bay Packers, Darnold finished with 341 passing yards and three touchdowns. Marred by 16 penalties, the Jets squandered a 15-point lead and lost 44–38 in overtime. During Week 17 against the New England Patriots, Darnold finished with 167 passing yards as the Jets lost 38–3 in the regular-season finale.

Darnold finished his rookie year with 2,865 passing yards, 17 touchdowns, and 15 interceptions to go along with 44 carries for 138 yards and a touchdown in 13 games and starts.

==== 2019 season ====
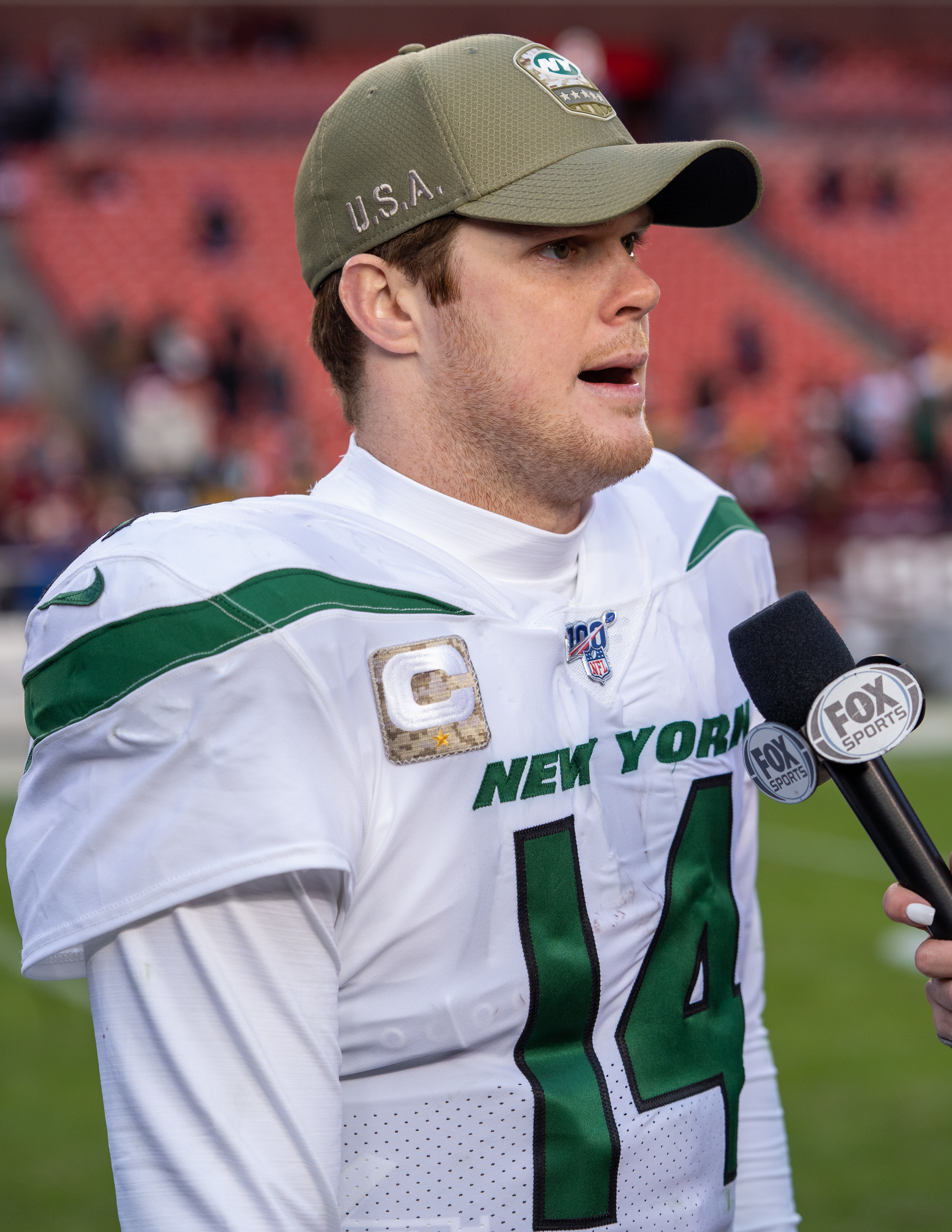
Darnold getting interviewed in 2019

During the Jets' home opener against the Bills in Week 1, Darnold finished with 179 passing yards and a touchdown. Despite the Jets having a 16–0 lead midway through the third quarter and four takeaways, the team lost 17–16. On September 12, it was reported that Darnold was diagnosed with mononucleosis, and he subsequently missed three games. He returned in Week 6 against the Dallas Cowboys where he finished with 338 passing yards, two touchdowns, and an interception as the Jets won 24–22. In the game, Darnold threw a 92-yard touchdown pass to Robby Anderson. He was named the American Football Conference Offensive Player of the Week for his performance. During Monday Night Football against the Patriots in Week 7, the Jets only had 154 total yards of offense with Darnold throwing four interceptions and losing a fumble as the Jets were shut out 33–0. A sound bite captured by NFL Films and ESPN showed Darnold, who was mic'd up, commenting that he was "seeing ghosts" while struggling during the game, which led to mockery by opposing NFL fanbases.

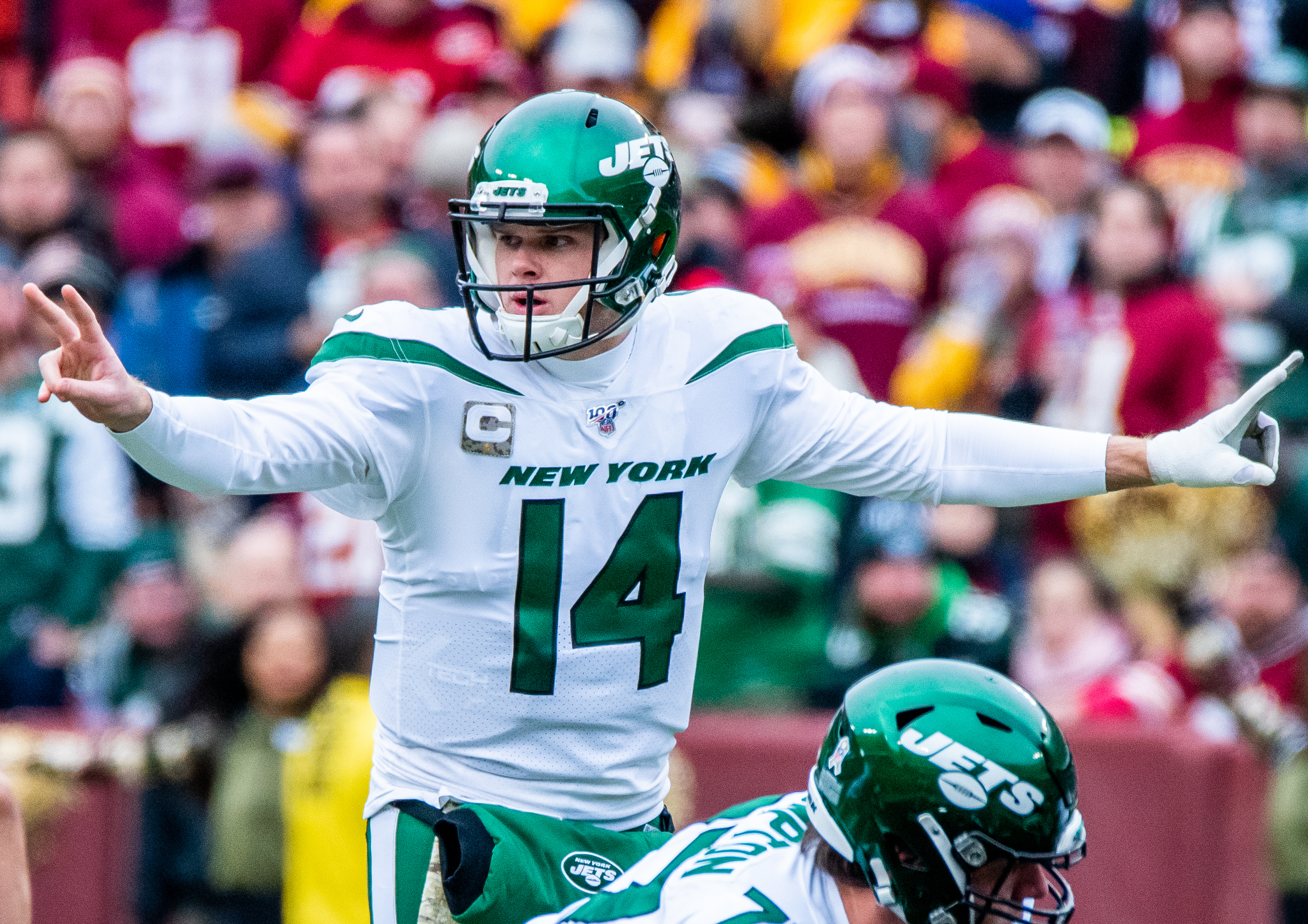
Darnold in 2019

During Week 8 against the Jaguars, Darnold finished with 218 passing yards, two touchdowns, and three interceptions as the Jets lost 29–15. During Week 9 against the Dolphins, Darnold finished with 260 passing yards, a touchdown, and an interception as the Jets lost 26–18. During Week 10 against the New York Giants, Darnold finished with 230 passing yards, 25 rushing yards, and two total touchdowns as the Jets won 34–27. During Week 11 against the Washington Redskins, Darnold finished with 293 passing yards, four touchdowns, and an interception as the Jets won 34–17. During Week 12 against the Oakland Raiders, Darnold finished with 315 passing yards and two touchdowns as the Jets won 34–3. In Week 13, Darnold finished with 239 passing yards, but penalties by the offensive line proved to be costly as the Jets lost 22–6 to the Cincinnati Bengals. During a Dolphins' rematch in Week 14, Darnold finished with 270 passing yards, two touchdowns, and an interception as the Jets narrowly won 22–21.

Darnold finishedhis second professional season with 3,024 passing yards, 19 touchdowns, and 13 interceptions to go along with 33 carries for 62 yards and two touchdowns in 13 games and starts.

==== 2020 season ====
During the season opener against the Bills, Darnold finished with 215 passing yards, a touchdown, and an interception in the 27–17 road loss. In the next game against the San Francisco 49ers, he threw for 179 yards and a touchdown during the 31–13 loss. The following week against the Colts, Darnold finished with 168 passing yards, a touchdown, and three interceptions, two of which were returned for a touchdown, while also being sacked in the endzone for a safety in the 36–7 loss.

During Thursday Night Football against the Broncos in Week 4, Darnold finished with 230 passing yards, 86 rushing yards, and highlighted a big play with a 46-yard rushing touchdown. He briefly left the game with a shoulder injury after a sack but was allowed back in the game. Still, the Jets lost 37–28. After missing two games due to shoulder soreness, Darnold returned in Week 7 against the Bills, finishing with 120 passing yards and two interceptions as the Jets lost 18–10. In Week 8 against the Kansas City Chiefs, Darnold reaggravated his shoulder injury and missed the Jets' next two games. He made his return in Week 12 against the Dolphins. During the game, Darnold continued to struggle, throwing for 197 yards and two interceptions in the 20–3 loss. In Week 13 against the Las Vegas Raiders, Darnold threw for 186 yards, two touchdowns, and one interception and also recorded a rushing touchdown during the 31–28 loss. This was Darnold's first game of the season in which he threw more touchdown passes than interceptions.

Darnold finished the 2020 season with 2,208 passing yards, nine touchdowns, and 11 interceptions to go along with 37 carries for 217 yards and two touchdowns in 12 games and starts as the Jets finished 2–14.

=== Carolina Panthers ===
==== 2021 season ====
On April 5, 2021, Darnold was traded to the Carolina Panthers in exchange for a 2021 sixth-round pick and second- and fourth-round picks in 2022. On April 30, the team exercised the fifth-year option on Darnold's contract, worth a guaranteed $18.858 million for the 2022 season.

Darnold made his first start for the Panthers on September 12, 2021, facing his former team, the Jets. During the game, Darnold threw for 279 passing yards and a touchdown, as well as adding a five-yard rushing touchdown, as they won 19–14. In the next game against the New Orleans Saints, Darnold threw for 305 yards, two touchdowns, and an interception, as the Panthers won 26–7. The following week against the Houston Texans, he threw for 304 yards and rushed for two touchdowns as the Panthers won 24–9. Darnold suffered a fractured scapula during the Panthers' 24–6 loss to the Patriots which made him miss four to six weeks with a shoulder injury. He was placed on injured reserve on November 12, 2021. Darnold returned December 25. Coach Rhule told Carolina's Media, on Darnold's return from injured reserve, he and Cam Newton would share play time. He substituted Darnold in the second quarter of a Week 16 game against the division rival Tampa Bay Buccaneers. He completed 15 of 32 passes for 190 yards as the Panthers went on to lose 32–6. It was the team's tenth loss in 12 games.

Darnold finished the 2021 season with 2,527 passing yards, nine touchdowns, and 13 interceptions to go along with 48 carries for 222 yards and five touchdowns. His season ended with a 4–7 record.

==== 2022 season ====
Darnold was named the backup for the 2022 season after losing a preseason competition to new acquisition and 2018 draftmate Baker Mayfield. During the third preseason game against the Bills, Darnold left the game with an ankle injury. It turned out to be a high ankle sprain, requiring 4–6 weeks to recover. On September 1, 2022, Darnold was placed on injured reserve. On November 7, Darnold was activated back to the roster by the Panthers. Darnold was named the starter for the Panthers' Week 12 game against the Denver Broncos. In his return, Darnold tossed for 164 yards and a touchdown on 11 of 19 passes, while also recovering a fumble for a touchdown as the Panthers beat the Broncos 23–10. In Week 14, Darnold led the Panthers to a 30–24 road victory over the Seattle Seahawks, throwing for 120 yards and a touchdown, as well as running four times for 30 yards. In Week 15 against the Pittsburgh Steelers, Darnold threw for 225 yards and a touchdown, however the Panthers would lose 24–16. Darnold and the Panthers would bounce back the following week against the Lions, winning 37–23. Darnold threw for 250 yards and a touchdown, while also earning a rushing touchdown. In Week 17 against the division rival Buccaneers, Darnold would throw for 341 yards, 3 touchdowns, and just one interception. However, it would not be enough since the Panthers went on to lose 30–24 and were subsequently eliminated from playoff contention. Darnold and the Panthers traveled to New Orleans for the final game of the season against the Saints, where Darnold played poorly, throwing for only 43 yards and two interceptions on 5 of 15 passing.

Darnold finished the 2022 season with 1,143 passing yards, seven touchdowns, and three interceptions to go along with 26 carries for 106 yards and two touchdowns alongside a 4–2 record as the starter. Following the season, Darnold's contract was not renewed, and he became a free agent.

=== San Francisco 49ers ===
On March 16, 2023, Darnold signed a one-year contract with the San Francisco 49ers. On August 23, Darnold was named the backup quarterback over Trey Lance, the team's third-overall selection from 2021, who was subsequently traded to the Dallas Cowboys the next day for a fourth-round pick.

With the top overall seed clinched, the 49ers elected to rest Brock Purdy and start Darnold in the regular season finale against the Los Angeles Rams. In the game, Darnold completed 16 of 26 pass attempts for 189 yards and a touchdown, as well as a rushing touchdown, as the 49ers narrowly lost 21–20. Darnold continued to serve as a backup to Purdy during the 49ers' postseason run to Super Bowl LVIII, which they lost in overtime 25–22.

Following the season, Darnold described his time with the 49ers as a valuable learning experience, citing the team's meticulous preparation and the influence of players like Brock Purdy and head coach Kyle Shanahan in reshaping his approach to the game.

=== Minnesota Vikings ===
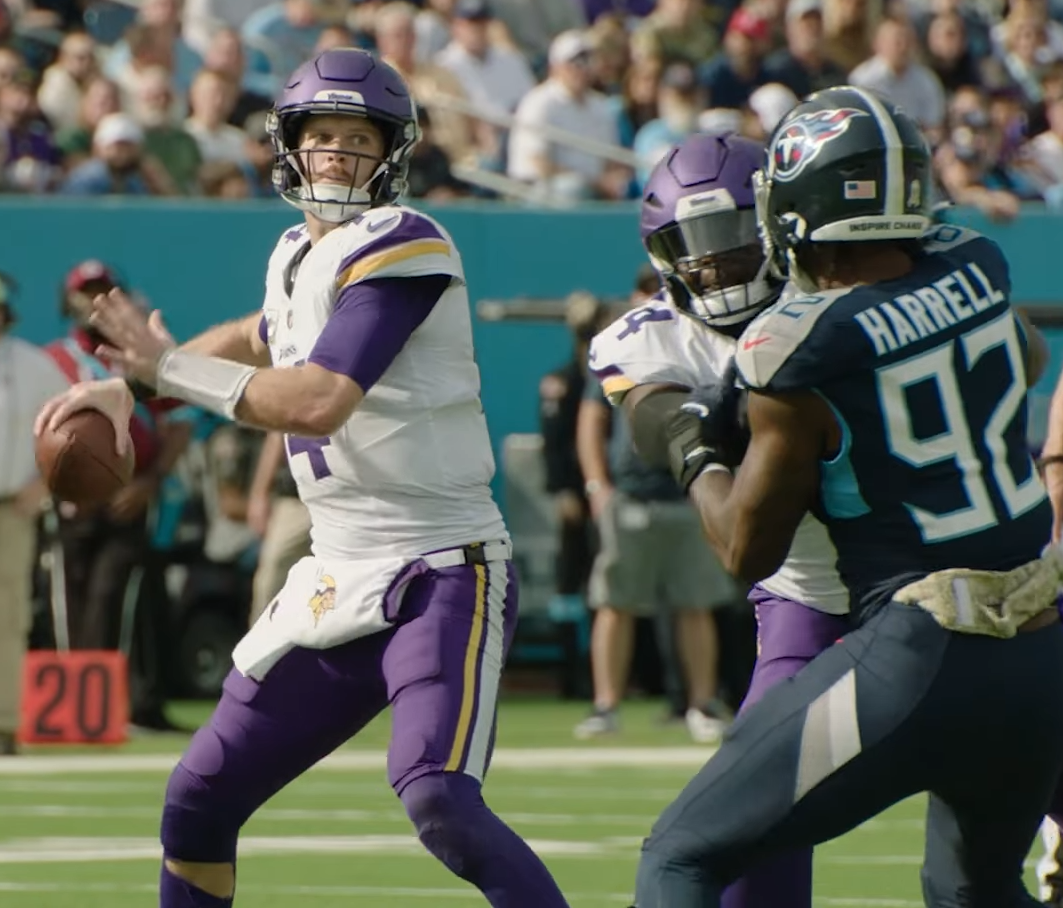
Darnold (left) in 2024

On March 13, 2024, Darnold signed a one-year, $10 million contract with the Minnesota Vikings. He was originally expected to compete with rookie J. J. McCarthy for the starting job, but was named the starting quarterback to begin the season following a season-ending injury to McCarthy in the preseason. Darnold was also named an offensive captain.

On September 8, Darnold made his Vikings debut against the Giants at MetLife Stadium, leading Minnesota to a 28–6 victory. He completed his first 12 passes and finished the game converting 19 of 24 passes for 208 yards and two touchdowns. In the next game against his former team, the 49ers, Darnold passed for 268 yards and two touchdowns, including a 97-yard touchdown to Justin Jefferson as the Vikings won 23–17. Darnold continued his hot start to the season by throwing four touchdowns and no interceptions in a 34–7 win against the Texans, followed by three touchdowns in the first half the next week against the Green Bay Packers as the Vikings improved to 4–0 for the first time since 2016. Darnold was named NFC Offensive Player of the Month, racking up 932 yards, a league-high 11 touchdowns, and a league-best 118.9 passer rating in September.

Darnold led the Vikings to a 5–0 start before suffering consecutive losses to the Detroit Lions and Los Angeles Rams. In Week 9 against the Indianapolis Colts, Darnold overcame three turnovers with three second-half touchdowns as the Vikings won 21–13. After a shaky, three-interception outing against the Jacksonville Jaguars, Darnold bounced back the following week with three total touchdowns against the Tennessee Titans. He then orchestrated game-winning drives in back-to-back games against the Chicago Bears and Arizona Cardinals, including a fourth quarter comeback against the Cardinals as the Vikings improved to 10–2. In Week 14 against the Atlanta Falcons, Darnold had a career day, leading the Vikings to a 42–21 victory. He finished with 347 yards and five touchdowns, along with setting the Vikings' single-game passer rating record at 157.9. Two weeks later, Darnold led another fourth quarter comeback against the Seattle Seahawks, finishing with three touchdowns as the Vikings won 27–24, extending their win streak to eight games.

In Week 17, Darnold had a career-high 377 yards and three touchdowns, leading the Vikings to a narrow 27–25 victory over the Packers, advancing their record to 14–2. With the win, he became the first quarterback to achieve 14 wins in the first season with a team. In the regular-season finale against the Lions with the NFC's top seed at stake, Darnold completed 18 of 41 passes (41.9%) for 166 yards and no touchdowns as the Vikings lost 31–9. In his playoff debut against the Rams, Darnold took nine sacks for a loss of 82 yards and lost a fumble that was returned for a touchdown as the Vikings lost 27–9. Despite the disappointing finish, Darnold still finished the season with career highs in nearly every statistical category, throwing for 4,319 yards, 35 touchdowns, and a 102.5 passer rating. He was also named to his first career Pro Bowl. Darnold was nominated for the AP Comeback Player of the Year award, but lost to Joe Burrow. He was ranked 72nd by his fellow players on the NFL Top 100 Players of 2025.

=== Seattle Seahawks ===
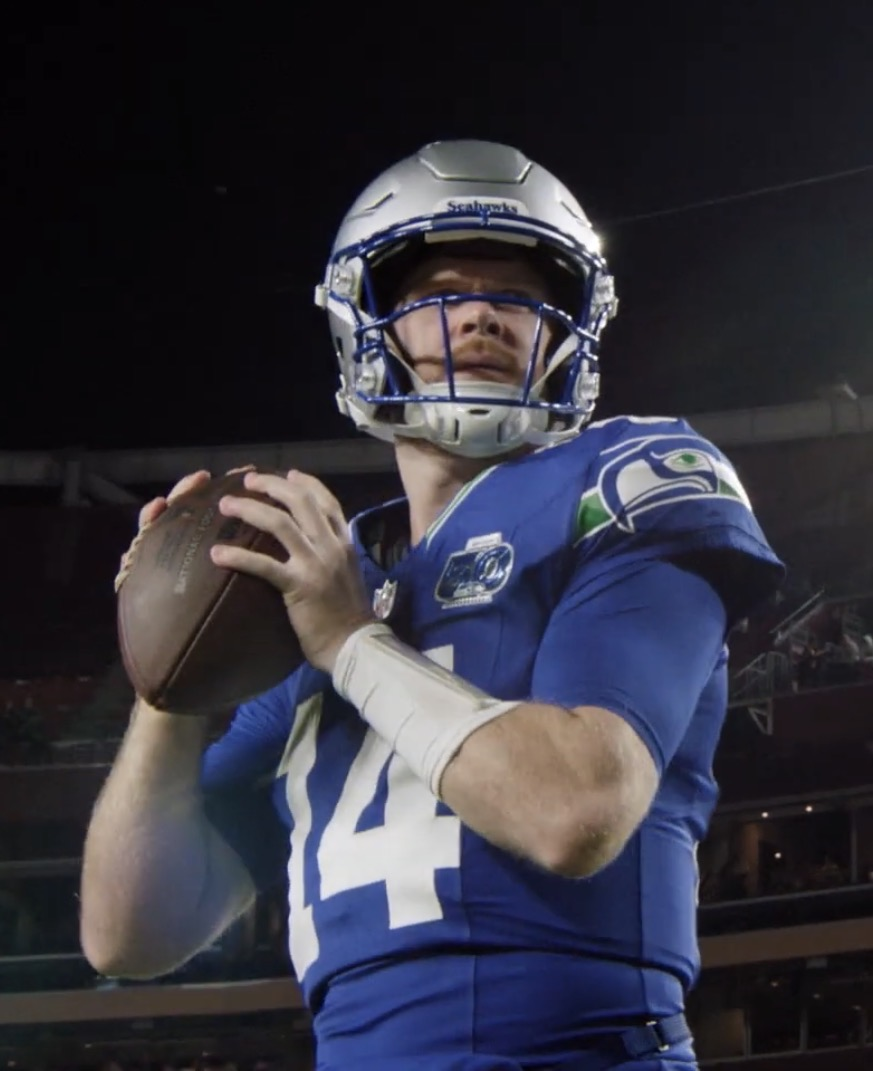
Darnold in 2025

==== 2025 season: Super Bowl LX championship ====
On March 13, 2025, Darnold signed with the Seattle Seahawks on a three-year, $100.5 million contract. The deal is structured such that the Seahawks could part ways with Darnold after one season, having paid him $37.5 million. The second year's salary of $27.5 million carries an injury guarantee of $17.5 million, which vests shortly after Super Bowl LX; the non-guaranteed third year would pay Darnold $35.5 million.

During Week 9 against the Washington Commanders, Darnold threw four touchdowns with no incompletions during the first half, becoming the first player to do so since Ryan Tannehill in 2015.

In a pivotal Week 16 matchup against the Los Angeles Rams, Darnold led a historic comeback for the Seahawks franchise, overcoming a 16-point deficit in the fourth quarter to narrowly win the game in overtime, 38–37, despite throwing two interceptions. Previously, the Seahawks were 0–172 when trailing by 15+ points in the fourth quarter until this matchup. The win was crucial in enabling the team to control their path to the #1 seed in the NFC.

After beating the San Francisco 49ers on the road in the regular season finale, 13–3, Darnold secured the #1-seed in the NFC for Seattle and became the second ever quarterback to have two straight 14-win seasons after Tom Brady. Darnold finished his first season with the Seahawks completing 67.7% of his passes for 4,048 yards, 25 touchdowns, and a 99.1 passer rating, though his 20 total turnovers led the league.

In the Divisional Round against the 49ers, Darnold recorded his first career playoff win in dominant fashion during the 41–6 victory. He completed 12 of 17 passes for 124 yards and a touchdown. During the NFC Championship Game against the Los Angeles Rams, Darnold led the Seahawks to a 31–27 victory, throwing for 346 yards and three touchdowns while completing 25 of 36 pass attempts. With the win, Darnold advanced to Super Bowl LX, his first as a starter, to face the New England Patriots. In the Super Bowl, Darnold connected on 19 of 38 passes for 202 yards and a touchdown to AJ Barner as the Seahawks won 29–13, earning Darnold his first Super Bowl ring and making him the first quarterback in the 2018 NFL draft class to win the Super Bowl as a starter. After leading the league in turnovers during the regular season, Darnold finished the postseason with no turnovers.

==== 2026 season ====
Darnold remained the Seahawks' starter in 2026, his first time being on the same team in consecutive years since his stint with the Panthers. Klint Kubiak's departure to become the Raiders' head coach meant Darnold had a seventh different play-caller, but newly-hired offensive coordinator Brian Fleury sought to provide continuity by running an offense similar to Kubiak's and Kyle Shanahan's in San Francisco.

On the fifth play of the team's season opener against the New England Patriots, Darnold was sacked and sustained a glute injury, causing him to miss the remainder of the game and Week 2. He made his return in the Week 3 upset loss against the Washington Commanders, completing 31 of 45 passes for 379 yards, four touchdowns, and two interceptions, including a critical pick-six that helped seal the narrow 33–31 road loss for the Seahawks.

During Week 8 versus the Chicago Bears, Darnold hurt his rib on a hard tackle from Kyler Gordon before injuring his quadriceps on the final drive. He completed 17 of 34 passes for 188 yards, two touchdowns, and an interception in the 34–17 defeat. The injuries prevented him from playing the following week.

== Playing style ==
Though not regarded widely as a dual-threat quarterback, Darnold has been praised for his mobility in the pocket, which allows him to escape pressure when needed, extend plays, and throw on the run. Darnold has also been described as a "gunslinger". He currently employs former quarterback Jordan Palmer as his quarterbacks coach.

== Career statistics ==
Legend
	Won the Super Bowl
	Led the league
**Bold**	Career high

=== NFL ===
==== Regular season ====
Year	Team	Games			Passing									Rushing					Sacked		Fumbles	
Year	Team	GP	GS	Record	Cmp	Att	Pct	Yds	Y/A	Lng	TD	Int	Rtg	Att	Yds	Y/A	Lng	TD	Sck	SckY	Fum	Lost
2018	NYJ	13	13	4–9	239	414	57.7	2,865	6.9	76	17	**15**	77.6	44	138	3.1	28	1	30	204	5	2
2019	NYJ	13	13	7–6	273	441	61.9	3,024	6.9	92	19	13	84.3	33	62	1.9	24	2	33	212	**11**	3
2020	NYJ	12	12	2–10	217	364	59.6	2,208	6.1	69	9	11	72.7	37	217	5.9	**46**	2	35	234	4	2
2021	CAR	12	11	4–7	243	406	59.9	2,527	6.2	63	9	13	71.9	48	**222**	4.6	30	**5**	35	204	9	4
2022	CAR	6	6	4–2	82	140	58.6	1,143	8.2	52	7	3	92.6	26	106	4.1	26	2	10	78	6	2
2023	SF	10	1	0–1	28	46	60.9	297	6.5	48	2	1	85.1	21	15	0.7	9	1	6	40	3	1
2024	MIN	17	17	**14–3**	**361**	**545**	66.2	**4,319**	7.9	**97T**	**35**	12	**102.5**	**67**	212	3.2	19	1	**48**	**335**	8	4
2025	SEA	17	17	**14–3** (Note: Tied with the Denver Broncos and New England Patriots.)	323	477	**67.7**	4,048	**8.5**	67	25	14	99.1	35	95	2.7	24	0	27	186	**11** (Note: Tied with Baker Mayfield and Cam Ward.)	**6**
2026	SEA	7	7	3–4	127	211	60.2	1,478	7.0	43	10	9	79.5	11	72	**6.5**	18	0	17	113	0	0
Career		107	97	52–45	1,893	3,044	62.2	21,909	7.2	97T	133	91	86.0	322	1,139	3.5	46	14	241	1,606	57	24

==== Postseason ====
Year	Team	Games			Passing									Rushing					Sacked		Fumbles	
Year	Team	GP	GS	Record	Cmp	Att	Pct	Yds	Y/A	Lng	TD	Int	Rtg	Att	Yds	Y/A	Lng	TD	Sck	SckY	Fum	Lost
2023	SF	0	0	—	DNP																	
2024	MIN	1	1	0–1	25	40	**62.5**	245	6.1	26	1	**1**	77.6	4	**19**	**4.8**	**17**	0	**9**	**82**	**1**	**1**
2025	SEA	3	3	**3–0**	**56**	**91**	61.5	**672**	**7.4**	**51**	**5**	0	**102.4**	**5**	14	2.8	14	0	6	51	**1**	0
Career		4	4	3–1	81	131	61.8	917	7.0	51	6	1	94.9	9	33	3.7	17	0	15	133	2	1

=== College ===
Season	Team	Games			Passing									Rushing				
Season	Team	GP	GS	Record	Cmp	Att	Pct	Yds	Avg	Lng	TD	Int	Rtg	Att	Yds	Avg	Lng	TD
2015	USC	0	0	—	Redshirt (redshirt)													
2016	USC	13	10	**9–1**	246	366	**67.2**	3,086	8.4	**68**	**31**	9	**161.1**	62	**250**	**4.0**	18	2
2017	USC	14	14	11–3	**303**	**480**	63.1	**4,143**	**8.6**	56	26	**13**	148.1	**75**	82	1.1	**39**	**5**
Career		27	24	20–4	549	846	64.9	7,229	8.5	68	57	22	153.7	137	332	2.4	39	7

== Career highlights ==
=== Awards and honors ===
NFL

- Super Bowl champion (LX)
- 2× Pro Bowl (2024, 2025)
- AFC Offensive Player of the Week (Week 6, 2019)
- NFC Offensive Player of the Week (Week 14, 2024)
- NFC Offensive Player of the Month (September 2024)
- Pro Football Writers Association Most Improved Player (2024)
- Ranked No. 72 in the NFL Top 100 Players of 2025
- Ranked No. 21 in the NFL Top 100 Players of 2026

College

- First-team All-Pac-12 (2017)
- Archie Griffin Award (2016)
- Pac-12 Offensive Freshman of the Year (2016)

=== Records ===
==== NFL records ====
- Youngest quarterback to post a passer rating higher than 110 – 116.8 rating at 21 years, 97 days old
- First quarterback in NFL history to record 14 wins in his first season with a team
- First quarterback in NFL history to record 14 wins in his first season with two different teams in back-to-back seasons

==== Jets franchise records ====
- Highest completion percentage by a rookie quarterback in a single season (2018) – 57.7
- Highest rookie quarterback rating, minimum seven appearances – 77.6

==== Vikings franchise records ====
- Highest passer rating in a game (Falcons at Vikings, December 8, 2024) – 157.9
- Most games with a 100 or better passer rating in a single season (2024) – 13

==== Seahawks franchise records ====
- Most consecutive completed passes in a game (Seahawks at Commanders, November 2, 2025) – 17 (tied with Warren Moon)
- Most wins for a starting quarterback in a season (2025) – 14

== Personal life ==
Darnold's mother is a physical education teacher at Shorecliffs Middle School. His older sister, Franki, played college volleyball at the University of Rhode Island. His grandfather, Dick Hammer, was a Marlboro Man actor and USC athlete.

Darnold has been jokingly nicknamed GEQBUS (God Emperor Quarterback of the United States), a parody of the acronym used for the President of the United States. The moniker was coined on "r/The_Darnold", a Reddit community parodying r/The_Donald for supporters of President Donald Trump. Many of his childhood friends refer to him as "Biff" in reference to his obsession with the character from his favorite childhood movie, Back to the Future Part III. Darnold is also well known for an ESPN graphic on Monday Night Football, a few days after he had been ruled out indefinitely due to mononucleosis. The graphic, consisting of Darnold pointing at the camera while his diagnosis is stated next to him, became an internet meme. The meme was referenced by many sportswriters after Darnold and the Seahawks won the NFC Championship to head to Super Bowl LX.

Darnold's friends include fellow quarterbacks Josh Allen and Kyle Allen, and the three often train together in the offseason.

While at USC, Darnold was a member of the Lambda Chi Alpha fraternity.

Darnold got engaged on July 8, 2025 to Katie Hoofnagle. They married on April 3, 2026 in Rancho Santa Fe, California. Guests included Josh Allen and his wife, Hailee Steinfeld, as well as Christian McCaffrey and his wife, Olivia Culpo.
