= Robbie Chosen =

American football player (born 1993)

Profile
- Position: Wide receiver

Personal information
- Born: May 9, 1993 (age 33); Fair Lawn, New Jersey, U.S.
- Listed height: 6 ft 3 in (1.91 m)
- Listed weight: 190 lb (86 kg)

Career information
- High school: South Plantation (Plantation, Florida)
- College: Temple (2011–2013, 2015)
- NFL draft: 2016: undrafted

Career history
- New York Jets (2016–2019); Carolina Panthers (2020–2022); Arizona Cardinals (2022); Miami Dolphins (2023); San Francisco 49ers (2024)*; Miami Dolphins (2024); San Francisco 49ers (2025)*; Washington Commanders (2025)
- * Offseason or practice squad member only

Career NFL statistics as of 2025
- Receptions: 385
- Receiving yards: 5,140
- Receiving touchdowns: 30
- Stats at Pro Football Reference

Robbie Chosen (born Robby Anderson; May 9, 1993), previously known as Robbie Anderson and briefly Chosen Anderson, (Note: Anderson legally modified his name to Robbie Anderson in 2022. In February 2023, he again legally changed his name to Chosen Anderson. He later adjusted this to make "Chosen" his last name and returned to using "Robbie" as his first name.) is an American professional football wide receiver. He played college football for the Temple Owls and was signed by the New York Jets as an undrafted free agent in 2016 and has also played in the NFL for the Carolina Panthers, Arizona Cardinals, Miami Dolphins, San Francisco 49ers, and Washington Commanders.

== Early life ==
Anderson was born on May 9, 1993, in Fair Lawn, New Jersey, and later moved to South Florida as a child. He attended and played football at South Plantation High School.

== College career ==
Anderson committed to Temple University to play college football for the Temple Owls over offers from other schools including Illinois, Indiana, and Marshall. After redshirting his first year in Philadelphia, Anderson saw time on special teams during his redshirt-freshman season and practiced primarily as a defensive back. Following Matt Rhule's hiring as Temple's head coach, Anderson switched to wide receiver in 2013 and caught 44 passes for 791 receiving yards and nine touchdowns. In the 2013 season, Anderson set a Temple school-record for receiving yards in a game with 239 against SMU. Anderson missed the 2014 season, however, due to academic eligibility issues. Anderson spent 2014 taking classes at a community college in Florida. Anderson returned to Temple for his senior season in 2015 season and had 70 catches for 939 yards. Anderson's reception and yardage totals were the second most ever by a Temple player in school history. Anderson was selected to the Eastern College Athletic Conference All-Conference team and Third Team All-Conference team by Phil Steele in recognition of his senior season. Following his senior season, Anderson was selected to play in the 2016 East–West Shrine Game.

== Professional career ==
Pre-draft measurables
Height	Weight	Arm length	Hand span	40-yard dash	10-yard split	20-yard split	20-yard shuttle	Three-cone drill	Vertical jump	Broad jump	Bench press
6 ft 2 7/8 in (1.90 m)	187 lb (85 kg)	30 in (0.76 m)	8 5/8 in (0.22 m)	4.36 s	1.59 s	2.56 s	4.27 s	7.07 s	36 1/2 in (0.93 m)	10 ft 8 in (3.25 m)	8 reps
All values from Temple's Pro Day

=== New York Jets ===
==== 2016 season ====
Despite running a 4.36-second 40-yard dash at Temple's pro day, Anderson went undrafted in the 2016 NFL draft. On May 1, 2016, the New York Jets signed Anderson to a three-year, $1.63 million contract that included a signing bonus of $10,000 as an undrafted free agent.

Anderson entered training camp competing against Jalin Marshall, Chandler Worthy, Jeremy Ross, and Charone Peake to be the Jets' fifth wide receiver. He went on to lead all players in the 2016 pre-season in receiving yards with 264, and also had 13 catches and three touchdowns, which helped him earn a spot on the Jets' final 53-man roster and become their fifth wide receiver entering the regular season, behind Brandon Marshall, Eric Decker, Quincy Enunwa, and Jalin Marshall.

He made his professional regular season debut in the Jets' season-opening 23–22 loss to the Cincinnati Bengals. On September 25, 2016, Anderson made his first career reception on a 26-yard pass from Ryan Fitzpatrick and finished the 24–3 loss to the Kansas City Chiefs with a total of two receptions for 34 receiving yards. The next game, Anderson was named the Jets' starting slot receiver against the Seattle Seahawks and finished the 27–17 loss with two catches for 12 receiving yards. Following Eric Decker's season-ending injury on October 12, 2016, Anderson became Jets' starting slot receiver. On December 5, 2016, he made four receptions for 61 yards and caught his first career touchdown on a 40-yard pass from Bryce Petty. The New York Jets went on to lose to the Indianapolis Colts 41–10. The following week, Anderson had a season-high six catches and 99 receiving yards in a 23–17 victory over the San Francisco 49ers. In a Week 15 matchup against the Miami Dolphins, he led the Jets with 80 receiving yards, made four receptions, and caught a 40-yard touchdown pass from Petty as the Jets lost by a score of 34–13.

He finished his rookie season with 42 receptions, 587 receiving yards, and two touchdowns in 16 games and eight starts.

==== 2017 season ====
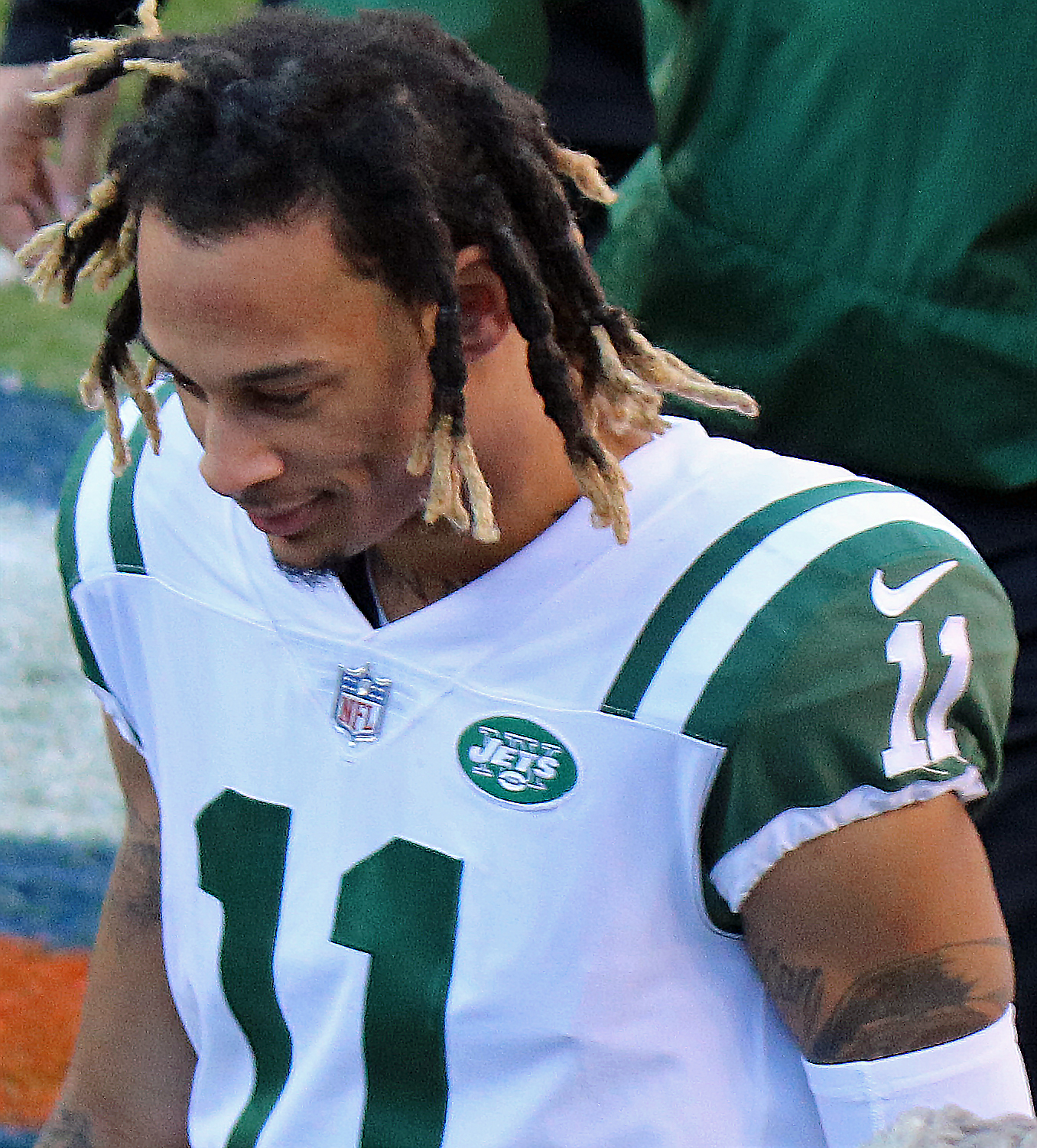
Anderson in 2017

Anderson started his second season with six receptions for 50 receiving yards combined over his first two games, a 21–12 loss to the Buffalo Bills and a 45–20 loss to the Oakland Raiders. In Week 3, a 20–6 victory over the Dolphins, he had three receptions for 95 receiving yards and his first receiving touchdown of the season. During Week 7, in the second divisional game against the Dolphins, Anderson was held to 35 receiving yards on three catches. Prior to the final play in the fourth quarter, Anderson threw his helmet in rage, frustrated that he wasn't getting enough targets, which drew an unsportsmanlike conduct penalty. On October 27, Anderson was fined $12,154. During Week 8 against the Atlanta Falcons, Anderson performed far better as he posted his first career game with over 100 receiving yards. He had 106 receiving yards on six catches, including one touchdown and a one-handed catch for 32 yards in a 25–20 loss. During Week 12 against the Carolina Panthers, Anderson highlighted big plays, including a 54-yard touchdown and a 33-yard touchdown, extending his touchdown streak to five games, leading all NFL wide receivers. He finished with 146 receiving yards but the Jets lost 35–27. During Week 13 against the Chiefs, Anderson finished with 107 receiving yards as the Jets won 38–31. Over the final four games of the regular season, he combined for 14 receptions for 120 receiving yards. Overall, he finished his second professional season with 63 receptions for 941 receiving yards and seven receiving touchdowns.

==== 2018 season ====
Over the first four games of the 2018 season, Anderson had been limited to eight receptions for 108 yards and one touchdown. During Week 5 against the Denver Broncos, Anderson highlighted two big plays with touchdowns 76 yards and 35 yards respectively. He finished the game with 123 receiving yards on three receptions as the Jets won 34–16. During Week 16 against the Green Bay Packers, Anderson finished with 140 receiving yards and a touchdown as the Jets lost 38–44 in overtime. He finished the season as the Jets leading receiver with 50 receptions for 752 yards and six touchdowns.

==== 2019 season ====
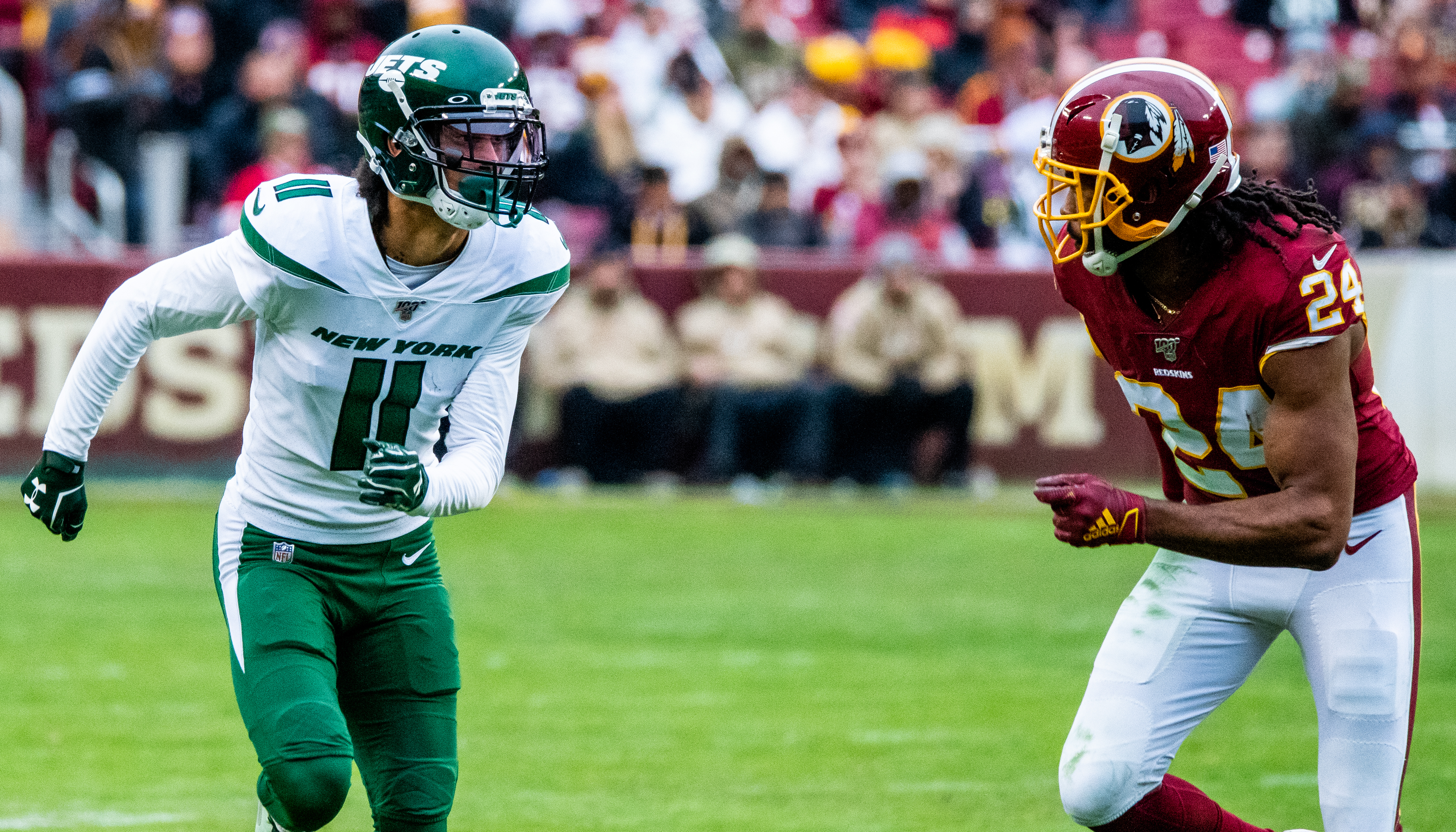
Anderson in a game against the Washington Redskins in 2019.

On February 28, 2019, the Jets placed a second-round restricted free agent tender on Anderson.

During Week 6 against the Dallas Cowboys, Anderson finished with five catches for 125 yards, including a 92-yard touchdown as the Jets won 24–22. During Week 14 against the Dolphins, Anderson finished with seven catches for 116 receiving yards and a touchdown as the Jets won 22–21. Overall, Anderson finished the 2019 season with 52 receptions for 779 receiving yards and five receiving touchdowns.

=== Carolina Panthers ===
==== 2020 season ====
On April 1, 2020, the Panthers signed Anderson to a two-year, $20 million contract that included $12 million guaranteed and a signing bonus of $8 million. The signing reunited Anderson with former Temple head coach and recently hired Carolina Panthers' head coach Matt Rhule and former Temple teammates Keith Kirkwood, P. J. Walker, and Colin Thompson.

Anderson made his debut with the Panthers in Week 1 against the Las Vegas Raiders. Anderson finished the game with six catches for 115 receiving yards and a touchdown from former Jets' teammate Teddy Bridgewater as the Panthers lost 30–34. During Week 2 against the Tampa Bay Buccaneers, Anderson finished with nine receptions for 109 receiving yards as the Panthers lost 17–31. During Week 5 against the Falcons, Anderson finished with eight receptions for 112 receiving yards as the Panthers won 23–16. In Week 12 against the Minnesota Vikings, Anderson recorded 4 catches for 94 yards, including a 41-yard touchdown reception, during the 28–27 loss. Anderson finished the 2020 season with 95 receptions for 1,096 receiving yard and three receiving touchdowns.

On August 24, 2021, Anderson re-signed with the Panthers on a two-year contract extension worth $29.5 million, which extended through the 2023 season.

==== 2021 season ====
During Week 1, against the Jets, Anderson had a 57-yard touchdown on his only reception of the game as the Panthers won 19–14. Anderson finished the 2021 season with 53 receptions for 519 receiving yards and five receiving touchdowns.

==== 2022 season ====
Anderson began the season with 102 yards and a touchdown in a Week 1 matchup against the Cleveland Browns In Week 6 against the Los Angeles Rams, Anderson was kicked out of the game by interim head coach Steve Wilks after Anderson got into an argument with wide receiver coach Joe Dailey.

=== Arizona Cardinals ===
On October 17, 2022, the day after the game against the Rams, Anderson was traded to the Arizona Cardinals for a 2024 sixth round draft pick and a 2025 seventh round draft pick.

While in Arizona, Anderson played in nine games and had seven receptions for 76 yards and no touchdowns.

On March 8, 2023, he was released by the Cardinals.

=== Miami Dolphins (first stint) ===
On April 17, 2023, Anderson signed with the Miami Dolphins. He was released on August 29, 2023 and re-signed to the practice squad.

On September 24, 2023, while the Dolphins led the Broncos 56–13, Chosen, who had been a practice squad activation that day, caught a 68-yard pass from Mike White that he ran in for a touchdown. He was signed to the active roster on September 30. He was released on November 16, and re-signed to the practice squad. He was signed back to the active roster on November 21. He finished the 2023 season with four receptions for 126 yards and a touchdown, which came in Week 3 against the Broncos in a 70–20 win.

=== San Francisco 49ers (first stint) ===
On August 12, 2024, Chosen signed with the San Francisco 49ers. On August 27, 2024, he was released by the San Francisco 49ers during the announcement of the 53-man roster for the 2024 season.

=== Miami Dolphins (second stint) ===
On August 29, 2024, Chosen signed with the Miami Dolphins practice squad. He was released by the Dolphins on September 17 after appearing in two regular season games, finishing with one reception for five yards.

=== San Francisco 49ers (second stint) ===
On August 3, 2025, Chosen signed with the San Francisco 49ers. He was released on August 26 as part of final roster cuts and re-signed to the practice squad the next day. On September 9, Chosen was released from the practice squad.

=== Washington Commanders ===
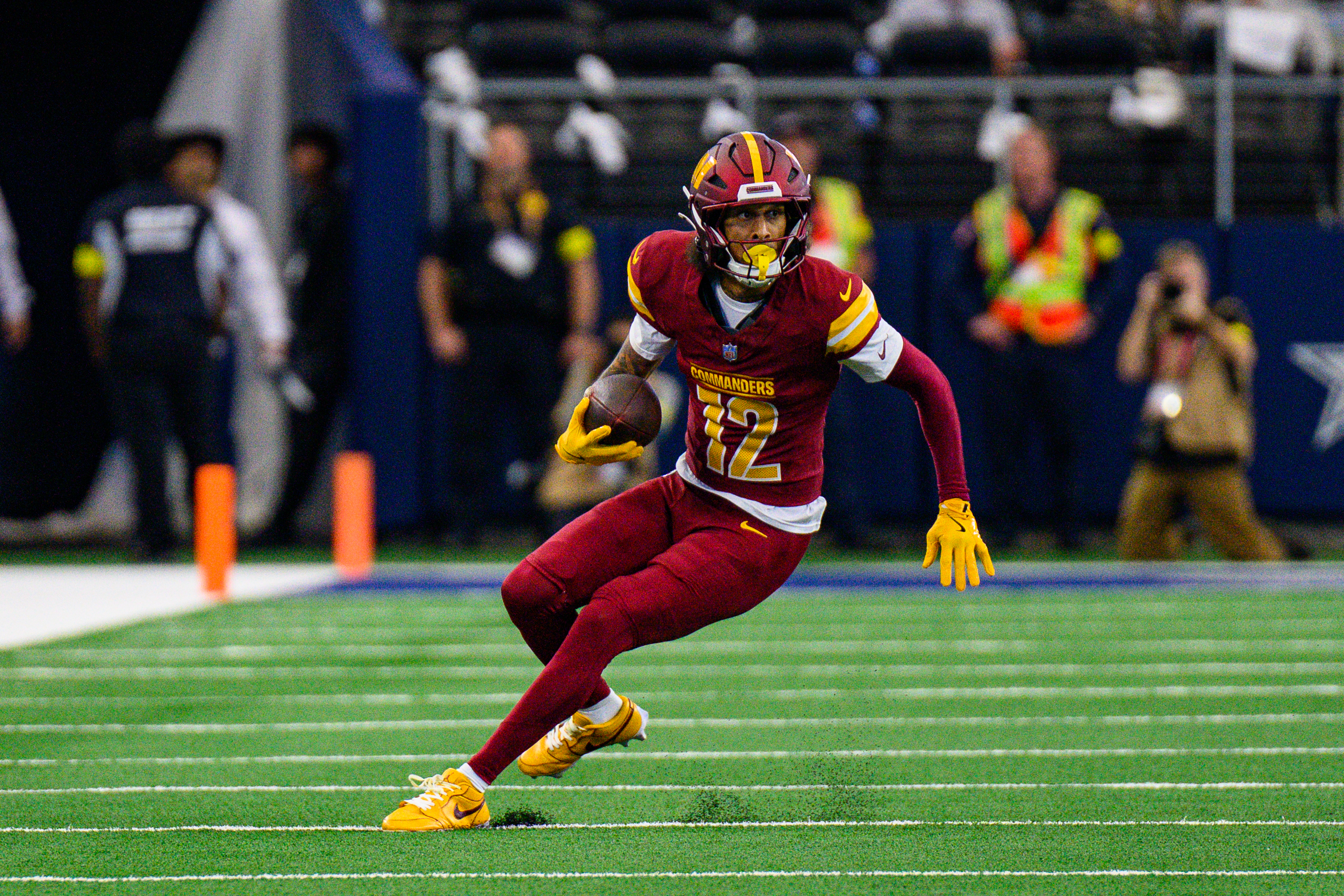
Chosen with the Washington Commanders in 2025

On October 1, 2025, Chosen signed with the practice squad of the Washington Commanders. He was released on October 27, and subsequently re-signed two days later. The Commanders signed Chosen to their active roster on November 11. On November 28, the Commanders released him again. He was re-signed to their practice squad on December 2, 2025.

== Career statistics ==
=== NFL ===
Year	Team	Games		Receiving					Rushing					Fumbles	
Year	Team	GP	GS	Rec	Yds	Avg	Lng	TD	Att	Yds	Avg	Lng	TD	Fum	Lost
2016	NYJ	16	8	42	587	14.0	52	2	3	42	14.0	30	0	1	1
2017	NYJ	16	15	63	941	14.9	69T	7	3	9	3.0	7	0	0	0
2018	NYJ	14	9	50	752	15.0	76T	6	2	−8	−4.0	1	0	2	2
2019	NYJ	16	15	52	779	15.0	92T	5	1	4	4.0	0	0	1	0
2020	CAR	16	16	95	1,096	11.5	75	3	4	15	3.8	0	0	1	1
2021	CAR	17	16	53	519	9.8	57	5	3	36	12.0	30	0	0	0
2022	CAR	6	5	13	206	15.8	75T	1	0	0	0	0	0	1	1
2022	ARI	10	2	7	76	10.9	21	0	0	0	0	0	0	0	0
2023	MIA	9	0	4	126	31.5	68T	1	0	0	0	0	0	0	0
2024	MIA	2	0	1	5	5.0	5	0	0	0	0	0	0	0	0
2025	WAS	3	0	5	53	10.6	17	0	0	0	0	0	0	0	0
Career		125	86	385	5,140	13.4	92	30	16	98	6.1	30	0	6	5

=== College ===
Season	Team	GP	Receiving				Rushing			
Season	Team	GP	Rec	Yds	Avg	TD	Att	Yds	Avg	TD
2013	Temple	10	44	791	18.0	9	2	−4	−2.0	0
2015	Temple	14	70	939	13.4	7	4	15	3.8	0
Career		24	114	1,730	15.2	16	6	11	1.8	0
