= 2015 New York Jets season =

2015 season of NFL team New York Jets

- Owner: Woody & Christopher Johnson
- General manager: Mike Maccagnan
- Head coach: Todd Bowles
- Home stadium: MetLife Stadium

Results
- Record: 10–6
- Division place: 2nd AFC East
- Playoffs: Did not qualify
- Pro Bowlers: WR Brandon Marshall; CB Darrelle Revis; DE Muhammad Wilkerson; C Nick Mangold; RB Chris Ivory

Uniform
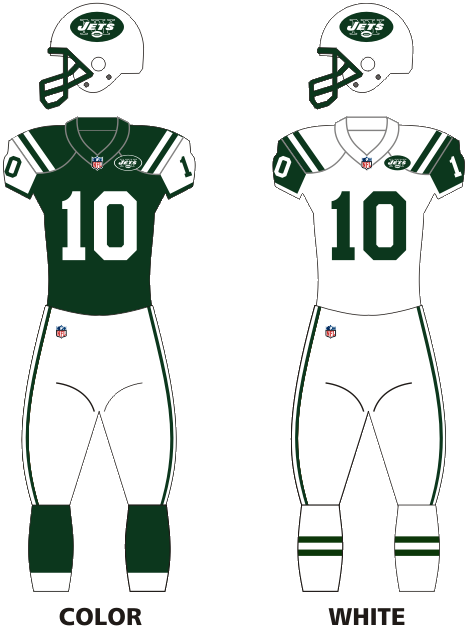

The 2015 season was the New York Jets' 46th in the National Football League (NFL) and their 56th overall. The team improved on their 4–12 record in 2014 under former head Coach Rex Ryan. Under new head coach Todd Bowles, they succeeded in matching their previous season’s win count in just five games, starting 4–1. Prior to the season, the Jets made a number of moves, including, re-acquiring Darrelle Revis and Antonio Cromartie, two cornerbacks who were instrumental in the Jets previous defensive success, and obtaining Ryan Fitzpatrick and Brandon Marshall in trades. The team regressed to 5–5, before going on a five-game winning streak, clinching their first winning season since 2010. However, it wasn't enough to make the playoffs, as they lost to the Buffalo Bills in Week 17 and the Pittsburgh Steelers defeated the Cleveland Browns. The Steelers, who also finished 10–6, clinched the final AFC playoff spot over the Jets based on a better record vs. common opponents. The Jets finished the season as the league's only team with a winning record to not make the playoffs, and as of 2025, this was the last Jets team to post a winning record. This was also tied with the 2020 Miami Dolphins season as the closest quarterback Ryan Fitzpatrick came to making the playoffs in his 17-year career.

== Transactions ==
=== Coaching and staff personnel changes ===
- The Jets fired general manager John Idzik and head coach Rex Ryan on December 29, 2014.
- Offensive line coach Mike Devlin left the Jets to accept the same position with the Houston Texans on January 9, 2015.
- The Jets hired Mike Maccagnan as general manager on January 13, 2015.
- The Jets hired Todd Bowles as head coach on January 14, 2015.
- Jets defensive coordinator Dennis Thurman, defensive line coach Karl Dunbar, linebackers coach Bobby April III, defensive backs coach Tim McDonald, assistant defensive line coach Jeff Weeks, and assistant strength and conditioning coach Jason Oszvart were hired to the same positions by the Buffalo Bills on January 15, 2015. Offensive assistant Tony Sparano Jr. was named tight ends coach on January 15 by the Bills.
- Quarterbacks coach David Lee was hired by the Buffalo Bills for the same position on January 19, 2015.
- The Jets hired Chan Gailey as offensive coordinator on January 20, 2015.
- The Jets hired Kacy Rodgers as defensive coordinator, Bobby April as special teams coordinator, Mike Caldwell as the assistant head coach/inside linebackers coach, Mark Collins as the outside linebackers coach, Joe Danna as the defensive backs coach, Karl Dorrell as the wide receivers coach, and Robby Brown as an offensive quality control coach on January 23, 2015.
- The Jets hired Pepper Johnson as the defensive line coach on January 24, 2015.
- The Jets hired Brian Heimerdinger as director of player personnel on January 27, 2015.
- The Jets hired Steve Marshall as offensive line coach, Marcel Shipp as running backs coach and Kevin Patullo as quarterbacks coach on January 27, 2015.
- The Jets hired Rex Hogan as senior director of college scouting on January 29, 2015.
- The Jets hired Jimmie Johnson as tight ends coach, Daylon McCutcheon as assistant defensive backs coach, and Ryan Slowik as assistant defensive line/defensive quality control coach on January 29, 2015.
- The Jets named Ron Heller as assistant offensive line coach and Steve Hagen as assistant special teams coach on February 3, 2015.
- The Jets hired John Scott, Jr. as a defensive quality control coach on February 11, 2015.
- The Jets fired director of pro personnel Brendan Prophett on May 4, 2015.

=== Arrivals ===
- The Jets signed Andrew Furney, Mario Harvey, Keith Lewis, Dashaun Phillips, Brent Qvale, Daryl Richardson, Jake Schum and Chris Young to reserve/future contracts on December 30, 2014.
- The Jets signed Sean Hooey to a reserve/future contract on January 24, 2015.
- The Jets signed Curtis Brown on February 10, 2015.
- The Jets signed Ronald Talley on March 4, 2015.
- The Jets signed Buster Skrine, Darrelle Revis and James Carpenter on March 11, 2015.
- The Jets signed Antonio Cromartie and Marcus Gilchrist on March 18, 2015.
- The Jets signed James Brewer on March 19, 2015.
- The Jets signed Kevin Vickerson, Stephen Bowen and Corey Hilliard on March 24, 2015.
- The Jets signed Kellen Davis on March 25, 2015.
- The Jets signed Jamari Lattimore on April 1, 2015.
- The Jets signed Erin Henderson on April 8, 2015.
- The Jets signed Stevan Ridley and Joe Mays on April 13, 2015.
- The Jets signed Julian Howsare, Greg Henderson, Jordan Williams, Durell Eskridge, Davon Walls, Demarkus Perkins, Wes Saxton, Taiwan Jones, and Deion Barnes on May 8, 2015.
- The Jets signed Jake Heaps and J. C. Copeland on May 11, 2015.
- The Jets signed Jonathon Rumph on June 1, 2015.
- The Jets signed Charles Brown on June 12, 2015.
- The Jets signed Steve Maneri on June 15, 2015.
- The Jets signed Austin Hill on July 28, 2015.
- The Jets signed Jarrod West on August 2, 2015.
- The Jets signed Arthur Williams on August 4, 2015.
- The Jets signed Keon Lyn on August 7, 2015.
- The Jets signed Javier Arenas on August 11, 2015.
- The Jets claimed Arthur Lynch off waivers on August 18, 2015.
- The Jets signed Matt Flynn on August 19, 2015.
- The Jets signed Matt LaCosse on August 24, 2015.
- The Jets signed Bryan Johnson on August 25, 2015.
- The Jets signed Josh Johnson on August 27, 2015.
- The Jets signed Ronald Martin and Chris Owusu on September 6, 2015.
- The Jets signed Deion Barnes, Julian Howsare, Wesley Johnson, Taiwan Jones, Keon Lyn, Walt Powell, Wes Saxton and Jordan Williams to the practice squad on September 6, 2015.
- The Jets signed Rontez Miles to the Practice Squad on September 7, 2015.

=== Departures ===
- The Jets released Percy Harvin on March 10, 2015.
- The Jets released Chris Pantale, Chris Young, and Mario Harvey and Corey Hilliard retired on May 8, 2015.
- The Jets released Demarkus Perkins and Greg Henderson on May 11, 2015.
- The Jets released Matt Simms on May 28, 2015.
- The Jets released Sean Hooey on June 11, 2015.
- The Jets released Andrew Furney on July 28, 2015.
- The Jets released J. C. Copeland on August 1, 2015.
- The Jets released Jarrod West on August 4, 2015.
- The Jets waived Antonio Allen on August 7, 2015.
- The Jets released Ikemefuna Enemkpali on August 11, 2015.
- The Jets released Jake Schum on August 18, 2015.
- The Jets waived Arthur Williams on August 19, 2015.
- The Jets waived Davon Walls on August 24, 2015.
- The Jets released Steve Maneri on August 25, 2015.
- The Jets released Jake Heaps on August 27, 2015.
- The Jets released Javier Arenas, James Brewer, Curtis Brown, Dalton Freeman, T. J. Graham, Saalim Hakim, Austin Hill, Bryan Johnson, Matt LaCosse, Keith Lewis, DeVier Posey and Jonathon Rumph on August 30, 2015.
- The Jets waived Dashaun Phillips on September 1, 2015.
- The Jets released Jason Babin, Deion Barnes, Charles Brown, Durell Eskridge, Shaquelle Evans, Matt Flynn, Julian Howsare, Josh Johnson, Wesley Johnson, Taiwan Jones, Keon Lyn, Arthur Lynch, Joe Mays, Walt Powell, Chris Owusu, Daryl Richardson, Wes Saxton, Ronald Talley and Jordan Williams on September 5, 2015.
- The Jets waived Rontez Miles on September 6, 2015.
- The Jets waived Oday Aboushi on September 15, 2015.
- The Jets released Kevin Vickerson on September 16, 2015.
- The Jets waived Quinton Coples on November 23, 2015.

=== Trades ===
==== To Jets ====
- The Chicago Bears traded Brandon Marshall and a 2015 seventh round (224th overall) draft pick to the Jets for New York's 2015 fifth round (142nd overall) draft pick on March 10, 2015.
- The Houston Texans traded Ryan Fitzpatrick to the Jets for a 2016 late-round conditional draft pick on March 11, 2015.
- The Houston Texans traded DeVier Posey and their 2015 third round (82nd overall), fifth round (152nd overall), and seventh round (229th overall) draft picks to the Jets for New York's 2015 third round (70th overall) draft pick on May 1, 2015.
- The St. Louis Rams traded Zac Stacy to the Jets for New York's 2015 seventh round (224th overall) pick on May 2, 2015.

==== From Jets ====
- The Jets traded their 2015 fourth round (104th overall) and seventh round (224th overall) draft picks to the Jacksonville Jaguars for Jacksonville's 2015 fourth round (103rd overall) draft pick on May 2, 2015.

=== Free agents ===
Position	Player	Free agency tag	Date signed/released	2015 team	Notes
CB	Phillip Adams	UFA	March 12, 2015	Atlanta Falcons	
LB	Nick Bellore	UFA	April 3, 2015	San Francisco 49ers	
G	Willie Colon	UFA	March 12, 2015	New York Jets	
FB	John Conner	UFA	May 13, 2015	Buffalo Bills	
LB	Jermaine Cunningham	UFA	–	–	–
DE	Leger Douzable	UFA	April 8, 2015	New York Jets	
NT	Kenrick Ellis	UFA	March 18, 2015	New York Giants	
LB	David Harris	UFA	March 6, 2015	New York Jets	
NT	Damon Harrison	RFA	April 29, 2015	New York Jets	
OT	Ben Ijalana	UFA	April 1, 2015	New York Jets	
S	Jaiquawn Jarrett	ERFA	April 24, 2015	New York Jets	
RB	Chris Johnson	UFA	August 17, 2015	Arizona Cardinals	
S	Dawan Landry	UFA	–	–	–
RB	Bilal Powell	UFA	March 10, 2015	New York Jets	
LS	Tanner Purdum	UFA	March 12, 2015	New York Jets	
WR	Greg Salas	RFA	May 13, 2015	Detroit Lions	
QB	Matt Simms	ERFA	December 30, 2014	New York Jets	
QB	Michael Vick	UFA	August 25, 2015	Pittsburgh Steelers	–
CB	Kyle Wilson	UFA	April 1, 2015	New Orleans Saints	

RFA: Restricted free agent, UFA: Unrestricted free agent, ERFA: Exclusive rights free agent, FT: Franchise tag

== Draft ==
2015 New York Jets Draft
RD	Selection	Player	Position	College	Notes
1	6	Leonard Williams	Defensive end	USC	
2	37	Devin Smith	Wide receiver	Ohio St.	
3	70	Traded to the Houston Texans for picks 82, 152, 229, and DeVier Posey.			
3	82	Lorenzo Mauldin	Outside linebacker	Louisville	Traded from the Houston Texans for pick 70 along with DeVier Posey
4	103	Bryce Petty	Quarterback	Baylor	Traded from the Jacksonville Jaguars for pick 104 and 229
4	104	Traded to the Jacksonville Jaguars for pick 103.			
5	142	Traded to the Chicago Bears for WR Brandon Marshall.			
5	152	Jarvis Harrison	Guard	Texas A&M	Traded from the Houston Texans for pick 70 along with DeVier Posey.
6	181	Traded to the Seattle Seahawks for WR Percy Harvin.			
7	223	Deon Simon	Defensive tackle	Northwestern State	
7	224	Traded from the Chicago Bears with WR Brandon Marshall then traded to the St. Louis Rams for RB Zac Stacy.			
7	229	Trade from Houston Texans via Cleveland Browns then traded to the Jacksonville Jaguars for pick 103.			

== Schedule ==
On November 6, 2014, the NFL announced that the Jets were scheduled to visit the Miami Dolphins at Wembley Stadium in London, England as part of the International Series. This became the first time that a divisional match has taken place in London. The game occurred on Sunday, October 4, and aired on CBS in the United States. The kickoff time was 9:30 a.m. EDT (2:30 p.m. local time). Miami is to be the designated home team for this game, and both teams will have their bye the following week.

The remainder of the Jets' 2015 schedule was announced on April 21.

=== Preseason ===
Week	Date	Opponent	Result	Record	Venue	Recap
1	August 13	at Detroit Lions	**L** 3–23	0–1	Ford Field	Recap
2	August 21	Atlanta Falcons	**W** 30–22	1–1	MetLife Stadium	Recap
3	August 29	at New York Giants	**W** 28–18	2–1	MetLife Stadium	Recap
4	September 3	Philadelphia Eagles	**W** 24–18	3–1	MetLife Stadium	Recap

=== Regular season ===
Week	Date	Opponent	Result	Record	Venue	Recap
1	September 13	Cleveland Browns	**W** 31–10	1–0	MetLife Stadium	Recap
2	September 21	at Indianapolis Colts	**W** 20–7	2–0	Lucas Oil Stadium	Recap
3	September 27	Philadelphia Eagles	**L** 17–24	2–1	MetLife Stadium	Recap
4	October 4	at **Miami Dolphins**	**W** 27–14	3–1	(United Kingdom) Wembley Stadium (London)	Recap
5	Bye					
6	October 18	Washington Redskins	**W** 34–20	4–1	MetLife Stadium	Recap
7	October 25	at **New England Patriots**	**L** 23–30	4–2	Gillette Stadium	Recap
8	November 1	at Oakland Raiders	**L** 20–34	4–3	O.co Coliseum	Recap
9	November 8	Jacksonville Jaguars	**W** 28–23	5–3	MetLife Stadium	Recap
10	November 12	**Buffalo Bills**	**L** 17–22	5–4	MetLife Stadium	Recap
11	November 22	at Houston Texans	**L** 17–24	5–5	NRG Stadium	Recap
12	November 29	**Miami Dolphins**	**W** 38–20	6–5	MetLife Stadium	Recap
13	December 6	at New York Giants	**W** 23–20 (OT)	7–5	MetLife Stadium	Recap
14	December 13	Tennessee Titans	**W** 30–8	8–5	MetLife Stadium	Recap
15	December 19	at Dallas Cowboys	**W** 19–16	9–5	AT&T Stadium	Recap
16	December 27	**New England Patriots**	**W** 26–20 (OT)	10–5	MetLife Stadium	Recap
17	January 3	at **Buffalo Bills**	**L** 17–22	10–6	Ralph Wilson Stadium	Recap

Note: Intra-division opponents are in bold text.

== Standings ==
=== Division ===
AFC East
	W	L	T	PCT	DIV	CONF	PF	PA	STK
^{(2)} New England Patriots	12	4	0	.750	4–2	9–3	465	315	L2
New York Jets	10	6	0	.625	3–3	7–5	387	314	L1
Buffalo Bills	8	8	0	.500	4–2	7–5	379	359	W2
Miami Dolphins	6	10	0	.375	1–5	4–8	310	389	W1

=== Conference ===
AFC
#	Team	Division	W	L	T	PCT	DIV	CONF	SOS	SOV	STK
Division Leaders
1 (Note: Denver finished ahead of New England and Cincinnati for the No. 1 seed based on head-to-head sweep. New England finished ahead of Cincinnati for the No. 2 seed based on record vs. common opponents — New England's cumulative record against Buffalo, Denver, Houston and Pittsburgh was 4–1, while Cincinnati's cumulative record against the same four teams was 2–3.)	Denver Broncos	West	12	4	0	.750	4–2	8–4	.500	.479	W2
2	New England Patriots	East	12	4	0	.750	4–2	9–3	.473	.448	L2
3	Cincinnati Bengals	North	12	4	0	.750	5–1	9–3	.477	.406	W1
4	Houston Texans	South	9	7	0	.563	5–1	7–5	.496	.410	W3
Wild Cards
5	Kansas City Chiefs	West	11	5	0	.688	5–1	10–2	.496	.432	W10
6 (Note: Pittsburgh finished ahead of the New York Jets for the No. 6 seed and qualified for the last playoff spot based on record vs. common opponents — Pittsburgh's cumulative record against Cleveland, Indianapolis, New England and Oakland was 4–1, while the Jets' cumulative record against the same four teams was 3–2.)	Pittsburgh Steelers	North	10	6	0	.625	3–3	7–5	.504	.463	W1
Did not qualify for the postseason
7	New York Jets	East	10	6	0	.625	3–3	7–5	.441	.388	L1
8 (Note: Buffalo finished ahead of Indianapolis based on head-to-head victory.)	Buffalo Bills	East	8	8	0	.500	4–2	7–5	.508	.438	W2
9	Indianapolis Colts	South	8	8	0	.500	4–2	6–6	.500	.406	W2
10	Oakland Raiders	West	7	9	0	.438	3–3	7–5	.512	.366	L1
11	Miami Dolphins	East	6	10	0	.375	1–5	4–8	.469	.469	W2
12 (Note: Jacksonville finished ahead of Baltimore based on head-to-head victory.)	Jacksonville Jaguars	South	5	11	0	.313	2–4	5–7	.473	.375	L3
13	Baltimore Ravens	North	5	11	0	.313	3–3	4–8	.508	.425	L1
14	San Diego Chargers	West	4	12	0	.250	0–6	3–9	.527	.328	L2
15 (Note: Cleveland finished ahead of Tennessee based on head-to-head victory.)	Cleveland Browns	North	3	13	0	.188	1–5	2–10	.531	.271	L3
16	Tennessee Titans	South	3	13	0	.188	1–5	1–11	.492	.375	L4
Tiebreakers (Note: When breaking ties for three or more teams under the NFL's rules, they are first broken within divisions, then comparing only the highest ranked remaining team from each division.)

== Staff ==
New York Jets staff
Front office: Chairman/CEO – Woody Johnson; President – Neil Glat; General manager – Mike Maccagnan; Director of football administration – Jacqueline Davidson; Director of player personnel – Brian Heimerdinger; Senior director of college scouting – Rex Hogan; Head coaches: Head coach – Todd Bowles; Assistant head coach/inside linebackers – Mike Caldwell; Offensive coaches: Offensive coordinator – Chan Gailey; Quarterbacks – Kevin Patullo; Running backs – Marcel Shipp; Wide receivers – Karl Dorrell; Tight ends – Jimmie Johnson; Offensive line – Steve Marshall; Assistant offensive line – Ron Heller; Offensive quality control – Robby Brown	Defensive coaches: Defensive coordinator – Kacy Rodgers; Defensive line – Pepper Johnson; Assistant defensive line – Ryan Slowik; Outside linebackers – Mark Collins; Defensive backs – Joe Danna; Assistant defensive backs – Daylon McCutcheon; Defensive quality control – John Scott, Jr.; Special teams coaches: Special teams – Bobby April; Assistant special teams – Steve Hagen; Strength and conditioning: Head strength and conditioning – Justus Galac; Assistant strength and conditioning – Kavan Latham; Assistant strength and conditioning – Aaron McLaurin; → Coaching Staff → Staff Directory → More NFL staffs

== Final roster ==
2015 New York Jets roster
Quarterbacks (QB): 14 Ryan Fitzpatrick; 9 Bryce Petty; 7 Geno Smith; Running backs (RB): 40 Tommy Bohanon; 33 Chris Ivory; 29 Bilal Powell; 22 Stevan Ridley; Wide receivers (WR): 87 Eric Decker; 81 Quincy Enunwa; 11 Jeremy Kerley; 15 Brandon Marshall; 10 Kenbrell Thompkins; Tight ends (TE): 85 Jeff Cumberland; 47 Kellen Davis	Offensive linemen (OL): 77 James Carpenter G; 70 Dakota Dozier G; 60 D'Brickashaw Ferguson T; 68 Breno Giacomini T; 71 Ben Ijalana T; 76 Wesley Johnson C; 74 Nick Mangold C; 79 Brent Qvale T; 67 Brian Winters G; Defensive linemen (DL): 72 Stephen Bowen DE; 78 Leger Douzable DT; 94 Damon Harrison DT; 91 Sheldon Richardson DT; 96 Muhammad Wilkerson DE; 92 Leonard Williams DE	Linebackers (LB): 56 Demario Davis OLB; 52 David Harris MLB; 58 Erin Henderson OLB; 49 Taiwan Jones OLB; 54 Jamari Lattimore MLB; 95 Josh Martin OLB; 55 Lorenzo Mauldin OLB; 97 Calvin Pace OLB; 57 Trevor Reilly OLB; Defensive backs (DB): 34 Dion Bailey SS; 31 Antonio Cromartie CB; 21 Marcus Gilchrist FS; 42 Ronald Martin CB; 23 Dexter McDougle CB; 45 Rontez Miles SS; 27 Dee Milliner CB; 25 Calvin Pryor SS; 24 Darrelle Revis CB; 41 Buster Skrine CB; 26 Darrin Walls CB; 20 Marcus Williams CB; Special teams (ST): 8 Randy Bullock K; 46 Tanner Purdum LS; 4 Ryan Quigley P	Practice squad: 18 Joseph Anderson WR; 50 Deion Barnes OLB; 82 Brandon Bostick TE; 64 Jarvis Harrison G; 43 Julian Howsare FB; 75 Lawrence Okoye DE; 86 Wes Saxton TE; 32 Kevin Short CB; 65 Deon Simon DT; 51 Julian Stanford OLB; Reserve: 39 Antonio Allen FS (IR); 88 Jace Amaro TE (IR); 53 Mike Catapano DE (IR); 66 Willie Colon G (IR); 2 Nick Folk K (IR); 37 Jaiquawn Jarrett FS (IR); 17 Chris Owusu WR (IR); 30 Zac Stacy RB (IR); 44 Zach Sudfeld TE (IR); 19 Devin Smith WR (IR); Rookies in italics 53 active, 10 reserve, 10 practice squad

== Regular season results ==
=== Week 1: vs. Cleveland Browns ===
Week One: Cleveland Browns at New York Jets – Game summary

Quarter	1	2	3	4	Total
Browns	0	10	0	0	10
Jets	0	14	10	7	31

at MetLife Stadium, East Rutherford, New Jersey

- Date: September 13
- Game time: 1:00 p.m. EDT
- Game weather: 77 °F (25 °C), cloudy
- Game attendance: 78,160
- Referee: Jerome Boger
- TV announcers (CBS): Greg Gumbel, Trent Green and Jamie Erdahl
- Recap, Gamebook

Game information

First quarter

- No scoring plays

Second quarter

- CLE (11:01) - Travis Benjamin 54 yd pass from Johnny Manziel (Travis Coons kick)
  Browns 7, Jets 0 Drive: 5 plays, 58 yds, 3:14
- NYJ (9:41) - Chris Ivory 10 yd rush (Nick Folk kick)
  Browns 7, Jets 7 Drive: 2 plays, 9 yds, 0:12
- CLE (3:29) - Travis Coons 26 yd field goal
  Browns 10, Jets 7 Drive: 8 plays, 28 yds, 2:25
- NYJ (0:26) - Eric Decker 15 yd pass from Ryan Fitzpatrick (Nick Folk kick)
  Jets 14, Browns 10 Drive: 9 plays, 72 yds, 3:03

Third quarter

- NYJ (7:51) - Brandon Marshall 1 yd pass from Ryan Fitzpatrick (Nick Folk kick)
  Jets 21, Browns 10 Drive: 5 plays, 27 yds, 2:23
- NYJ (0:29) - Nick Folk 34 yd field goal
  Jets 24, Browns 10 Drive: 11 plays, 60 yds, 6:01

Fourth quarter

- NYJ (10:43) - Chris Ivory 3 yd rush (Nick Folk kick)
  Jets 31, Browns 10 Drive: 4 plays, 19 yds, 2:11

Top passers

- CLE – Johnny Manziel 13/24, 182 yds, 1 TD, 1 INT
- NYJ – Ryan Fitzpatrick 15/24, 179 yds, 2 TD, 1 INT

Top rushers

- CLE – Johnny Manziel 5 car, 35 yds
- NYJ – Chris Ivory 20 car, 91 yds, 2 TD

Top receivers

- CLE – Travis Benjamin 3 rec, 89 yds, 1 TD
- NYJ – Brandon Marshall 6 rec, 62 yds, 1 TD

Top defenders

- CLE – Donte Whitner 10 tackles
- NYJ – Calvin Pryor 10 tackles

Top special teams

- CLE - Andy Lee - 60.5 yd punt avg
- NYJ - Nick Folk - 1/1 FG, 4/4 XP

The Jets opened the season with a resounding 31–10 win over the Browns at MetLife Stadium to open Todd Bowles' tenure as Jets head coach, replacing Rex Ryan, who manned the sidelines for the past six seasons. The Jets had five takeaways against Cleveland, including a Johnny Manziel interception. Ryan Fitzpatrick had a solid debut, throwing 2 touchdown passes to Brandon Marshall and Eric Decker. Chris Ivory also had a good day, rushing for 91 yards and 2 touchdowns, the second of which sealed the game in the fourth quarter.

=== Week 2: at Indianapolis Colts ===
Week Two: New York Jets at Indianapolis Colts – Game summary

Quarter	1	2	3	4	Total
Jets	7	3	0	10	20
Colts	0	0	0	7	7

at Lucas Oil Stadium, Indianapolis, Indiana

- Date: September 21
- Game time: 8:30 p.m. EDT
- Game weather: Played indoors (retractable roof closed)
- Game attendance: 65,220
- Referee: John Hussey
- TV announcers (ESPN): Mike Tirico, Jon Gruden and Lisa Salters
- Recap, Gamebook

Game information

First quarter

- Eric Decker 6-yard TD pass from Ryan Fitzpatrick. (Nick Folk kick) Drive: 4 plays, 9 yards, 1:44 (NYJ 7-0)

Second quarter

- Nick Folk 35-yard field goal. Drive: 10 plays, 54 yards, 5:12 (NYJ 10-0)

Third quarter

- Donte Moncrief 26-yard touchdown reception from Andrew Luck. (Adam Vinatieri kick) Drive: 8 plays, 91 yards, 3:59 (NYJ 10-7)

Fourth quarter

- Brandon Marshall 15-yard touchdown reception from Ryan Fitzpatrick. (Nick Folk kick) Drive: 7 plays, 80 yards, 3:47 (NYJ 17-7)
- Nick Folk 46-yard field goal. Drive: 8 plays, 34 yards, 3:38 (NYJ 20-7)

Top passers

- NYJ – Ryan Fitzpatrick: 22/34, 244 yards, 2 TD, INT
- IND – Andrew Luck: 21/37, 250 yards, TD, 3 INT

Top rushers

- NYJ – Chris Ivory: 14 car, 57 yards
- IND – Frank Gore: 15 car, 57 yards

Top receivers

- NYJ – Brandon Marshall: 7 rec, 101 yards, TD
- IND – Donte Moncrief: 7 rec, 122 yards, TD

Top tacklers

- NYJ – Buster Skrine: 7 tackles
- IND – D'Qwell Jackson: 6 tackles

The Jets visited the Colts on Monday Night Football. In a sloppy game, the Jets defense forced five turnovers, intercepting Andrew Luck, the league leader in touchdown passes in 2014, three times. A 26-yard touchdown reception by Donte Moncrief cut the lead to three points before a clutch seven-play, 80-yard touchdown drive culminating in a 15-yard pass to Marshall sealed the win for the Jets.

=== Week 3: vs. Philadelphia Eagles ===
Week Three: Philadelphia Eagles at New York Jets – Game summary

Quarter	1	2	3	4	Total
Eagles	3	21	0	0	24
Jets	0	7	0	10	17

at MetLife Stadium, East Rutherford, New Jersey

- Date: September 27
- Game time: 1:00 p.m. EDT
- Game weather: 66 °F (19 °C), cloudy
- Game attendance: 78,160
- Referee: Gene Steratore
- TV announcers (Fox): Kevin Burkhardt, John Lynch and Pam Oliver
- Recap, Gamebook

Game information

First quarter

- Cody Parkey 30-yard field goal. Drive: 11 plays, 59 yards, 4:15. (PHI 3-0)

Second quarter

- Darren Sproles 89-yard punt TD return. (Cody Parkey kick) (PHI 10-0)
- Ryan Mathews 23-yard TD pass from Sam Bradford. (Cody Parkey kick) Drive: 8 plays, 75 yards, 3:19. (PHI 17-0)
- Darren Sproles 1-yard TD run. (Cody Parkey kick) Drive: 7 plays, 36 yards, 2:27. (PHI 24-0)
- Brandon Marshall 16-yard TD pass from Ryan Fitzpatrick. (Nick Folk kick) Drive: 9 plays, 79 yards, 2:05. (PHI 24-7)

Third quarter

- No scoring plays

Fourth quarter

- Jeremy Kerley 7-yard TD pass from Ryan Fitzpatrick. (Nick Folk kick) Drive: 16 plays, 81 yards, 8:11. (PHI 24-14)
- Nick Folk 53-yard field goal. Drive: 5 plays, 16 yards, 0:28. (PHI 24-17)

Top passers

- PHI – Sam Bradford: 14/28, 118 yards, TD
- NYJ – Ryan Fitzpatrick: 35/58, 283 yards, 2 TD, 3 INT

Top rushers

- PHI – Ryan Mathews: 24 car, 108 yards
- NYJ – Bilal Powell: 10 car, 31 yards

Top receivers

- PHI – Jordan Matthews: 6 rec, 49 yards
- NYJ – Brandon Marshall: 10 rec, 109 yards, TD

Top tacklers

- PHI – Jordan Hicks: 9 tackles
- NYJ – Demario Davis: 6 tackles

With 2014 rushing yards leader DeMarco Murray injured, Philadelphia's rushing attack was explosive under Ryan Mathews and Darren Sproles. The Eagles quickly jumped to a 24–0 lead in the second quarter, intercepting Ryan Fitzpatrick three times (although 2 of them were batted passes or botched catches). New York scored 17 unanswered; however the Jets couldn't capitalize on many opportunities and Philadelphia won 24–17. The Eagles remained the only NFL team that the Jets have never defeated in franchise history, as they improved their all-time head-to-head record to 10–0. This game was also known for Brandon Marshall’s attempt to pitch the ball backwards to his teammate, which resulted in a fumble recovery for the Eagles.

=== Week 4: at Miami Dolphins ===
NFL International Series

Week Four: New York Jets at Miami Dolphins – Game summary

Quarter	1	2	3	4	Total
Jets	10	10	7	0	27
Dolphins	0	7	0	7	14

at Wembley Stadium, London, England

- Date: October 4
- Game time: 2:30 p.m. BST/9:30 a.m. EDT
- Game weather: 59 °F (15 °C), sunny
- Game attendance: 83,986
- Referee: Craig Wrolstad
- TV announcers (CBS): Ian Eagle, Dan Fouts and Evan Washburn
- Recap, Gamebook

Game information

First quarter

- Chris Ivory 3-yard TD run. (Nick Folk kick) (NYJ 7-0)
- Nick Folk 22-yard field goal. (NYJ 10-0)

Second quarter

- Nick Folk 48-yard field goal. (NYJ 13-0)
- Ryan Tannehill 8-yard pass to Jake Stoneburner. (Andrew Franks kick) (NYJ 13-7)
- Ryan Fitzpatrick 10-yard pass to Eric Decker. (Nick Folk kick) (NYJ 20-7)

Third quarter

- Zac Stacy 2-yard TD run. (Nick Folk kick) (NYJ 27-7)

Fourth quarter

- Ryan Tannehill 10-yard pass to Kenny Stills. (Andrew Franks kick) (NYJ 27-14)

Top passers

- NYJ –
- MIA –

Top rushers

- NYJ –
- MIA –

Top receivers

- NYJ –
- MIA –

Top tacklers

- NYJ –
- MIA –

The Jets traveled across the pond for the first time in franchise history to face the Dolphins. The offense, led by quarterback Ryan Fitzpatrick, got off to a quick start with a 58-yard heave to Brandon Marshall and a 3-yard touchdown run by Chris Ivory to put the Jets up 7–0. The defense dominated most of the game, shutting down Ryan Tannehill. The Dolphins pulled within two scores in the fourth quarter, but the Jets forced two interceptions, sealing the win.

=== Week 6: vs. Washington Redskins ===
Week Six: Washington Redskins at New York Jets – Game summary

Quarter	1	2	3	4	Total
Redskins	7	6	0	7	20
Jets	7	3	17	7	34

at MetLife Stadium, East Rutherford, New Jersey

- Date: October 18
- Game time: 1:00 p.m. EDT
- Game weather: 49 °F (9 °C), clear
- Game attendance: 78,160
- Referee: Pete Morelli
- TV announcers (Fox): Kenny Albert, Daryl Johnston and Holly Sonders
- Recap, Gamebook

Game information

First quarter

Second quarter

Third quarter

Fourth quarter

Top passers

- WAS –
- NYJ –

Top rushers

- WAS –
- NYJ –

Top receivers

- WAS –
- NYJ –

Top tacklers

- WAS –
- NYJ –

In the first half, Washington played extremely aggressive on defense, forcing three turnovers. In the third quarter, the Jets' offense exploded, scoring 17 points and the defense intercepted quarterback Kirk Cousins twice to seal the win. In the victory, Brandon Marshall became the first Jets receiver since Don Maynard in 1968 to have four straight 100-yard games, and Chris Ivory recorded a career-high 196 total yards.

=== Week 7: at New England Patriots ===
Week Seven: New York Jets at New England Patriots – Game summary

Quarter	1	2	3	4	Total
Jets	3	7	7	6	23
Patriots	3	10	3	14	30

at Gillette Stadium, Foxborough, Massachusetts

- Date: October 25
- Game time: 1:00 p.m. EDT
- Game weather: 58 °F (14 °C), cloudy
- Game attendance: 66,829
- Referee: Bill Vinovich
- TV announcers (CBS): Ian Eagle, Dan Fouts and Evan Washburn
- Recap, Gamebook

Game information

First quarter

- NE – Stephen Gostkowski 38-yard field goal, 12:48. Patriots 3–0. Drive: 4 plays, -1 yard, 1:22.
- NYJ – Nick Folk 20-yard field goal, 7:29. tied 3–3. Drive: 15 plays, 78 yards, 5:19.

Second quarter

- NYJ – Jeremy Kerley 5-yard pass from Ryan Fitzpatrick, (Nick Folk kick), 12:30. Jets 10–3. Drive: 14 plays, 83 yards, 7:35.
- NE – Tom Brady 1-yard run (Stephen Gostkowski kick), 6:24. tied 10–10. Drive: 11 plays, 47 yards, 3:26.
- NE – Stephen Gostkowski 46-yard field goal, 2:00. Patriots 13–10. Drive: 7 plays, 31 yards, 2:49.

Third quarter

- NE – Stephen Gostkowski 24-yard field goal, 11:10. Patriots 16–10. Drive: 12 plays, 65 yards, 3:50.
- NYJ – Chris Ivory 9-yard pass from Ryan Fitzpatrick, (Nick Folk kick), 4:07. Jets 17–16. Drive: 13 plays, 80 yards, 7:03.

Fourth quarter

- NYJ – Nick Folk 30-yard field goal, 12:50. Jets 20–16. Drive: 9 plays, 71 yards, 4:12.
- NE – Danny Amendola 8-yard pass from Tom Brady, (Stephen Gostkowski kick), 7:16. Patriots 23–20. Drive: 10 plays, 80 yards, 5:34.
- NE – Rob Gronkowski 15-yard pass from Tom Brady, (Stephen Gostkowski kick), 1:13. Patriots 30–20. Drive: 10 plays, 68 yards, 4:19.
- NYJ – Nick Folk 55-yard field goal, 0:18. Patriots 30–23. Drive: 6 plays, 43 yards, 0:55.

Top passers

- NYJ – Ryan Fitzpatrick – 22/39, 295 yards, 2 TD
- NE – Tom Brady – 34/54, 355 yards, 2 TD

Top rushers

- NYJ – Chris Ivory – 17 rushes, 41 yards
- NE – Tom Brady – 4 rushes, 15 yards, TD

Top receivers

- NYJ – Eric Decker – 6 receptions, 94 yards
- NE – Rob Gronkowski – 11 receptions, 108 yards, TD

Top tacklers

- NYJ – Marcus Gilchrist – 8 tackles
- NE – Dont'a Hightower – 10 tackles

=== Week 8: at Oakland Raiders ===
Week Eight: New York Jets at Oakland Raiders – Game summary

Quarter	1	2	3	4	Total
Jets	3	3	7	7	20
Raiders	7	14	10	3	34

at O.co Coliseum, Oakland, California

- Date: November 1
- Game time: 4:05 p.m. EST/1:05 p.m. PST
- Game weather: 68 °F (20 °C), partly cloudy
- Game attendance: 54,700
- Referee: Ed Hochuli
- TV announcers (CBS): Kevin Harlan, Rich Gannon and Alex Flanagan
- Recap, Gamebook

Game information

First quarter

Second quarter

Third quarter

Fourth quarter

Top passers

- NYJ –
- OAK –

Top rushers

- NYJ –
- OAK –

Top receivers

- NYJ –
- OAK –

Top tacklers

- NYJ –
- OAK –

=== Week 9: vs. Jacksonville Jaguars ===
Week Nine: Jacksonville Jaguars at New York Jets – Game summary

Quarter	1	2	3	4	Total
Jaguars	3	7	3	10	23
Jets	14	0	7	7	28

at MetLife Stadium, East Rutherford, New Jersey

- Date: November 8
- Game time: 1:00 p.m. EST
- Game weather: 56 °F (13 °C), sunny
- Game attendance: 78,160
- Referee: Walt Coleman
- TV announcers (CBS): Greg Gumbel, Trent Green and Jamie Erdahl
- Recap, Gamebook

Game information

First quarter

- JAX – Jason Myers 45-yard field goal, Jaguars 3–0. Drive: 10 plays, 29 yards, 5:03.
- NYJ – Eric Decker 7-yard pass from Ryan Fitzpatrick (Ryan Quigley kick), Jets 7–3. Drive: 6 plays, 51 yards, 3:51.
- NYJ – Chris Ivory 1-yard run (Ryan Quigley kick), Jets 14–3. Drive: 6 plays, 31 yards, 2:43.

Second quarter

- JAX – Allen Hurns 30-yard pass from Blake Bortles (Jason Myers kick), Jets 14–10. Drive: 2 plays, 50 yards, 0:12.

Third quarter

- JAX – Jason Myers 39-yard field goal, Jets 14–13. Drive: 5 plays, 23 yards, 1:43.
- NYJ – Chris Ivory 1-yard run (Ryan Quigley kick), Jets 21–13. Drive: 8 plays, 73 yards, 2:30.

Fourth quarter

- JAX – Jason Myers 35-yard field goal, Jets 21–16. Drive: 9 plays, 73 yards, 2:55.
- NYJ – Brandon Marshall 20-yard pass from Ryan Fitzpatrick (Ryan Quigley kick), Jets 28–16. Drive: 3 plays, 25 yards, 0:56.
- JAX – Bryan Walters 20-yard pass from Blake Bortles (Jason Myers kick), Jets 28–23. Drive: 3 plays, 72 yards, 0:25.

Top passers

- JAX – Blake Bortles – 24/40, 381 yards, 2 TD, 2 INT
- NYJ – Ryan Fitzpatrick – 21/34, 272 yards, 2 TD

Top rushers

- JAX – T. J. Yeldon – 14 rushes, 64 yards
- NYJ – Chris Ivory – 23 rushes, 26 yards, 2 TD

Top receivers

- JAX – Allen Hurns – 5 receptions, 122 yards, TD
- NYJ – Erik Decker – 6 receptions, 79 yards, TD

Top tacklers

- JAX – Johnathan Cyprien – 7 tackles, 6 assists
- NYJ – Dion Bailey – 3 tackles, 3 assists, 0.5 sack

=== Week 10: vs. Buffalo Bills ===
Week Ten: Buffalo Bills at New York Jets – Game summary

Quarter	1	2	3	4	Total
Bills	0	12	10	0	22
Jets	3	0	7	7	17

at MetLife Stadium, East Rutherford, New Jersey

- Date: November 12
- Game time: 8:25 p.m. EST
- Game weather: 60 °F (16 °C), cloudy
- Game attendance: 78,160
- Referee: Brad Allen
- TV announcers (NFLN): Jim Nantz, Phil Simms and Tracy Wolfson
- Recap, Gamebook

Game information

First quarter

- NYJ: Randy Bullock 29-yard field goal, (NYJ 3-0). Drive: 10 plays, 76 yards, 4:57

Second quarter

- BUF: Dan Carpenter 47-yard field goal, (TIE 3-3). Drive: 4 plays, 5 yards, 1:28
- BUF: Duke Williams 19-yard fumble return, Dan Carpenter XP failed, (BUF 9-3).
- BUF: Dan Carpenter 41-yard field goal, (BUF 12-3). Drive: 12 plays, 57 yards, 4:47

Third quarter

- BUF: Karlos Williams 26-yard pass from Tyrod Taylor, Dan Carpenter XP good, (BUF 19-3). Drive: 7 plays, 80 yards, 3:45
- BUF: Dan Carpenter 29-yard field goal, (BUF 22-3). Drive: 5 plays, 12 yards, 2:24
- NYJ: Brandon Marshall 14-yard pass from Ryan Fitzpatrick, Randy Bullock XP good, (BUF 22-10). Drive: 8 plays, 80 yards, 4:03

Fourth quarter

- NYJ: Eric Decker 31-yard pass from Ryan Fitzpatrick, Randy Bullock XP good, (BUF 22-17). Drive: 9 plays, 69 yards, 2:51

Top passers

- BUF – Tyrod Taylor, 17/27, 158 yards, TD
- NYJ – Ryan Fitzpatrick, 15/34, 193 yards, 2 TD, 2 INT

Top rushers

- BUF – LeSean McCoy, 19 carries, 112 yards
- NYJ – Chris Ivory, 18 carries, 99 yards

Top receivers

- BUF – Charles Clay, 5 receptions, 52 yards
- NYJ – Eric Decker, 6 receptions, 85 yards, TD

Top tacklers

- BUF – Nigel Bradham, 4 tackles – Bacarri Rambo, 2 tackles, INT, FF
- NYJ – Demario Davis, 6 tackels, 1 sack

As part of Nike's NFL color rush on Thursday Night Football, the Jets wore Kelly green uniforms.

=== Week 11: at Houston Texans ===
Week Eleven: New York Jets at Houston Texans – Game summary

Quarter	1	2	3	4	Total
Jets	0	3	7	7	17
Texans	0	10	14	0	24

at NRG Stadium, Houston, Texas

- Date: November 22
- Game time: 1:00 p.m. EST/12:00 p.m. CST
- Game weather: Played indoors (retractable roof closed)
- Game attendance: 71,718
- Referee: John Parry
- TV announcers (CBS): Kevin Harlan and Rich Gannon
- Recap, Gamebook

Game information

First quarter

- No scoring

Second quarter

Third quarter

Fourth quarter

Top passers

- NYJ –
- HOU –

Top rushers

- NYJ –
- HOU –

Top receivers

- NYJ –
- HOU –

Top tacklers

- NYJ –
- HOU –

=== Week 12: vs. Miami Dolphins ===
Week Twelve: Miami Dolphins at New York Jets – Game summary

Quarter	1	2	3	4	Total
Dolphins	0	0	7	13	20
Jets	7	7	7	17	38

at MetLife Stadium, East Rutherford, New Jersey

- Date: November 29
- Game time: 1:00 p.m. EST
- Game weather: 45 °F (7 °C), sunny
- Game attendance: 78,160
- Referee: Bill Vinovich
- TV announcers (CBS): Ian Eagle, Dan Fouts and Evan Washburn
- Recap, Gamebook

Game information

First quarter

Second quarter

Third quarter

Fourth quarter

Top passers

- MIA –
- NYJ –

Top rushers

- MIA –
- NYJ –

Top receivers

- MIA –
- NYJ –

Top tacklers

- MIA –
- NYJ –

=== Week 13: at New York Giants ===
Week Thirteen: New York Jets at New York Giants – Game summary

Quarter	1	2	3	4	OT	Total
Jets	3	7	0	10	3	23
Giants	0	20	0	0	0	20

at MetLife Stadium, East Rutherford, New Jersey

- Date: December 6
- Game time: 1:00 p.m. EST
- Game weather: 51 °F (11 °C), sunny
- Game attendance: 80,898
- Referee: John Hussey
- TV announcers (CBS): Ian Eagle, Dan Fouts and Evan Washburn
- Recap, Gamebook

Game information

First quarter

- NYJ – Randy Bullock 24-yard field goal, 5:51. Jets 3–0. Drive: 11 plays, 78 yards, 6:33.

Second quarter

- NYG – Dwayne Harris 80-yard punt return (Josh Brown kick), 15:00. Giants 7–3.
- NYG – Josh Brown 20-yard field goal, 9:02. Giants 10–3. Drive: 4 plays, 8 yards, 1:58.
- NYJ – Bilal Powell 25-yard pass from Ryan Fitzpatrick (Randy Bullock kick), 3:30. Tied 10–10. Drive: 9 plays, 79 yards, 5:37.
- NYG – Odell Beckham Jr. 72-yard pass from Eli Manning (Josh Brown kick), 2:27. Giants 17–10. Drive: 3 plays, 80 yards, 1:08.
- NYG – Josh Brown 35-yard field goal, 0:34. Giants 20–10. Drive: 6 plays, 50 yards, 1:12.

Third quarter

- No scoring plays.

Fourth quarter

- NYJ – Randy Bullock 24-yard field goal, 4:33. Giants 20–13. Drive: 12 plays, 80 yards, 4:18.
- NYJ – Brandon Marshall 9-yard pass from Ryan Fitzpatrick (Randy Bullock kick), 0:32. Tied 20–20. Drive: 10 plays, 71 yards, 2:13.

Overtime

- NYJ – Randy Bullock 31-yard field goal, 8:50. Jets 23–20. Drive: 13 plays, 61 yards, 6:15.

Top passers

- NYJ – Ryan Fitzpatrick – 36/50, 390 yards, 2 TD
- NYG – Eli Manning – 18/34, 297 yards, TD, INT

Top rushers

- NYJ – Chris Ivory – 10 rushes, 47 yards
- NYG – Orleans Darkwa – 8 rushes, 23 yards

Top receivers

- NYJ – Brandon Marshall – 12 receptions, 131 yards, TD
- NYG – Odell Beckham Jr. – 6 receptions, 149 yards, TD

Top tacklers

- NYJ – David Harris – 9 tackles
- NYG – Landon Collins – 8 tackles

The Jets came back from a 20–10 deficit to beat the Giants via a Randy Bullock field goal and a late fourth quarter touchdown by Brandon Marshall to send the game to overtime. The Jets sealed the win after Josh Brown missing his third field goal attempt of the game.

=== Week 14: vs. Tennessee Titans ===
Week Fourteen: Tennessee Titans at New York Jets – Game summary

Quarter	1	2	3	4	Total
Titans	0	0	8	0	8
Jets	10	17	0	3	30

at MetLife Stadium, East Rutherford, New Jersey

- Date: December 13
- Game time: 1:00 p.m. EST
- Game weather: 67 °F (19 °C), clear
- Game attendance: 78,160
- Referee: Jerome Boger
- TV announcers (CBS): Kevin Harlan, Rich Gannon and Otis Livingston
- Recap, Gamebook

Game information

First quarter

Second quarter

Third quarter

Fourth quarter

Top passers

- TEN –
- NYJ –

Top rushers

- TEN –
- NYJ –

Top receivers

- TEN –
- NYJ –

Top tacklers

- TEN –
- NYJ –

=== Week 15: at Dallas Cowboys ===
Week Fifteen: New York Jets at Dallas Cowboys – Game summary

Quarter	1	2	3	4	Total
Jets	6	3	0	10	19
Cowboys	3	7	3	3	16

at AT&T Stadium, Arlington, Texas

- Date: December 19
- Game time: 8:25 p.m. EST/7:25 p.m. CST
- Game weather: Played indoors (retractable roof closed)
- Game attendance: 90,345
- Referee: Craig Wrolstad
- TV announcers (NFLN): Jim Nantz, Phil Simms and Tracy Wolfson
- Recap, Gamebook

Game information

First quarter

- DAL – Dan Bailey 27-yard field goal, 10:50. Cowboys 3–0. Drive: 9 plays, 70 yards, 4:11.
- NYJ – Bilal Powell 12-yard run (kick failed), 0:35. Jets 6–3. Drive: 7 plays, 60 yards, 1:48.

Second quarter

- NYJ – Randy Bullock 36-yard field goal, 7:06. Jets 9–3. Drive: 4 plays, 6 yards, 2:44.
- DAL – Dez Bryant 10-yard pass from Kellen Moore (Dan Bailey kick), 1:25. Cowboys 10–9. Drive: 4 plays, 55 yards, 0:30.

Third quarter

- DAL – Dan Bailey 38-yard field goal, 3:49. Cowboys 13–9. Drive: 4 plays, 2 yards, 0:42.

Fourth quarter

- NYJ – Eric Decker 3-yard pass from Ryan Fitzpatrick (Randy Bullock kick), 9:01. Jets 16–13. Drive: 9 plays, 70 yards, 5:07.
- DAL – Dan Bailey 50-yard field goal, 2:00. Tied 16–16. Drive: 11 plays, 51 yards, 7:03.
- NYJ – Randy Bullock 40-yard field goal, 0:41. Jets 19–16. Drive: 8 plays, 58 yards, 1:19.

Top passers

- NYJ – Ryan Fitzpatrick – 26/39, 299 yards, TD, INT
- DAL – Kellen Moore – 15/25, 158 yards, TD, 3 INT

Top rushers

- NYJ – Chris Ivory – 13 rushes, 37 yards
- DAL – Darren McFadden – 16 rushes, 100 yards

Top receivers

- NYJ – Brandon Marshall – 4 receptions, 74 yards
- DAL – Dez Bryant – 4 receptions, 50 yards, TD

Top tacklers

- NYJ – Damon Harrison – 4 tackles, 4 assists
- DAL – Anthony Hitchens – 5 tackles, 5 assists

=== Week 16: vs. New England Patriots ===
Week Sixteen: New England Patriots at New York Jets – Game summary

Quarter	1	2	3	4	OT	Total
Patriots	0	3	10	7	0	20
Jets	3	7	7	3	6	26

at MetLife Stadium, East Rutherford, New Jersey

- Date: December 27
- Game time: 1:00 p.m. EST
- Game weather: 57 °F (14 °C), cloudy
- Game attendance: 78,160
- Referee: Clete Blakeman
- TV announcers (CBS): Ian Eagle, Dan Fouts and Evan Washburn
- Recap, Gamebook

Game information

First quarter

- NYJ – Randy Bullock 30-yard field goal, 3:22. Jets 3–0. Drive: 13 plays, 79 yards, 6:58.

Second quarter

- NE – Stephen Gostkowski 35-yard field goal, 8:50. Tied 3–3. Drive: 12 plays, 69 yards, 5:59.
- NYJ – Brandon Marshall 2-yard pass from Ryan Fitzpatrick (Randy Bullock kick), 2:00. Jets 10–3. Drive: 13 plays, 80 yards, 6:49.

Third quarter

- NYJ – Brandon Marshall 33-yard pass from Ryan Fitzpatrick (Randy Bullock kick), 9:19. Jets 17–3. Drive: 6 plays, 61 yards, 4:09.
- NE – Stephen Gostkowski 44-yard field goal, 4:59. Jets 17–6. Drive: 8 plays, 54 yards, 4:19.
- NE – Jamie Collins 14-yard fumble return (Stephen Gostkowski kick), 3:31. Jets 17–13.

Fourth quarter

- NYJ – Randy Bullock 49-yard field goal, 13:33. Jets 20–13. Drive: 9 plays, 49 yards, 4:53.
- NE – James White 9-yard pass from Tom Brady (Stephen Gostkowski kick), 2:00. Tied 20–20. Drive: 11 plays, 66 yards, 4:31.

Overtime

- NYJ – Eric Decker 6-yard pass from Ryan Fitzpatrick, 12:27. Jets 26–20. Drive: 5 plays, 80 yards, 2:37.

Top passers

- NE – Tom Brady – 22/31, 231 yards, TD, INT
- NYJ – Ryan Fitzpatrick – 26/41, 296 yards, 3 TD

Top rushers

- NE – Brandon Bolden – 9 rushes, 30 yards
- NYJ – Bilal Powell – 7 rushes, 56 yards

Top receivers

- NE – Rob Gronkowski – 4 receptions, 86 yards
- NYJ – Brandon Marshall – 8 receptions, 115 yards, 2 TD

Top tacklers

- NE – Jamie Collins: 6 tackles, 2 assists, 1 FF, 1 FR, 1 TD
- NYJ – Marcus Gilchrist: 8 tackles

This game became well known for the coin toss to start overtime. New England won the toss; however, instead of receiving the ball to give Tom Brady the first chance to score, the Patriots elected to kick. This caused much confusion for captain Matthew Slater, as he questioned after the toss if the team, because they won the toss, would also get to choose which end of the field they would like to kick. However, referee Clete Blakeman said "You elected to kick", and the Patriots were unable to choose which end of the field to kick off to, as in the NFL rulebook, the team that loses the coin toss gets to choose which end to receive the ball, if the team that wins the toss elects to defer. If the team that wins the coin toss receives, the team that loses the toss will elect which way to kick. The Jets marched right down the field to score the game-winning touchdown on their first possession as Ryan Fitzpatrick found Eric Decker. This turned out to be not only their last win over the Patriots until 2023 but also their last home win over New England until 2024.

=== Week 17: at Buffalo Bills ===
Week Seventeen: New York Jets at Buffalo Bills – Game summary

Quarter	1	2	3	4	Total
Jets	0	7	10	0	17
Bills	7	9	3	3	22

at Ralph Wilson Stadium, Orchard Park, New York

- Date: January 3, 2016
- Game time: 1:00 p.m. EST
- Game weather: 35 °F (2 °C), cloudy
- Game attendance: 68,670
- Referee: Walt Anderson
- TV announcers (CBS): Ian Eagle, Dan Fouts and Evan Washburn
- Recap, Gamebook

Game information

First quarter

- BUF – Tyrod Taylor 18-yard run (Dan Carpenter kick), 5:55. Bills 7–0. Drive: 3 plays, 25 yards, 1:19.

Second quarter

- BUF – Karlos Williams 2-yard run (kick failed), 13:02. Bills 13–0. Drive: 13 plays, 70 yards, 6:21.
- NYJ – Brandon Marshall 17-yard pass from Ryan Fitzpatrick (Randy Bullock kick), 9:42. Bills 13–7. Drive: 3 plays, 60 yards, 1:26.
- BUF – Dan Carpenter 20-yard field goal, 0:27. Bills 16–7. Drive: 15 plays, 70 yards, 9:16.

Third quarter

- NYJ – Randy Bullock 39-yard field goal, 13:24. Bills 16–10. Drive: 4 plays, 2 yards, 0:49.
- BUF – Dan Carpenter 37-yard field goal, 5:05. Bills 19–10. Drive: 14 plays, 66 yards, 8:19.
- NYJ – Eric Decker 21-yard pass from Ryan Fitzpatrick (Randy Bullock kick), 1:15. Bills 19–17. Drive: 11 plays, 77 yards, 3:52.

Fourth quarter

- BUF – Dan Carpenter 42-yard field goal, 3:53. Bills 22–17. Drive: 13 plays, 56 yards, 6:54.

Top passers

- NYJ – Ryan Fitzpatrick – 16/37, 181 yards, 2 TD, 3 INT
- BUF – Tyrod Taylor – 18/28, 182 yards

Top rushers

- NYJ – Chris Ivory – 6 rushes, 81 yards
- BUF – Tyrod Taylor – 10 rushes, 51 yards, TD

Top receivers

- NYJ – Brandon Marshall – 8 receptions, 126 yards, TD
- BUF – Sammy Watkins – 11 receptions, 136 yards

Top tacklers

- NYJ – David Harris – 14 tackles, 2.0 sacks
- BUF – Corey Graham – 6 tackles

With the loss, coupled with the Steelers defeating the Browns the same day, the Jets were eliminated from the playoffs for the fifth consecutive season. This was also the first time since 2004 that one team defeated another twice in the same season and both games ended with the same score. The Jets also sought a six-game winning streak for the first time since 1986. It was also quarterback Ryan Fitzpatrick's first return to Buffalo since the Bills released him following the 2012 season. As of 2025, this remains the last time the Jets had a winning season.
