= Schappert =

Schappert is a surname of German origin meaning shepherd, which is related to the English surname Shepherd.

Notable people with the surname include:

- Ashley Schappert (born 1985), athlete, entrepreneur, and film producer
- Jason Schappert (born 1988), aviator
- John Schappert (baseball) (died 1917), baseball pitcher
- Nicole Schappert (born 1986), maiden name of distance runner Nicole Tully
- Terry Schappert (born 1962), soldier and television presenter
