= Mike Maccagnan =

American football executive (born 1967)

Philadelphia Eagles
- Title: Personnel executive

Personal information
- Born: August 7, 1967 (age 59); Hightstown, New Jersey, U.S.

Career information
- High school: Peddie School
- College: Trinity College

Career history
- Washington Redskins (1990) Scouting intern; World League of American Football (1990) League scout; London Monarchs (1991) Director of player personnel; Ottawa Rough Riders (1993) Scouting director of player personnel; Saskatchewan Roughriders (1994) Director of scouting; Washington Redskins (1994) College scout; Washington Redskins (1995–2000) Pro scout; Houston Texans (2000–2010) Coordinator of college scouting; Houston Texans (2010–2011) Assistant director of college scouting; Houston Texans (2011–2014) Director of college scouting; New York Jets (2015–2019) General manager; Philadelphia Eagles (2026–present) Personnel executive

Awards and highlights
- PFWA NFL Executive of the Year (2015)
- Executive profile at Pro Football Reference

Mike Maccagnan (born August 7, 1967) is an American football personnel executive for the Philadelphia Eagles of the National Football League (NFL). He served as general manager for the New York Jets of the NFL from 2015 to 2019.

== Early life ==
He graduated from Trinity College in Hartford, Connecticut with a bachelor's degree in economics. Before that, he attended the Peddie School in Hightstown, NJ. He then attended Trinity-Pawling School in Pawling, NY for his postgraduate year. Maccagnan played lacrosse and football in high school and also for Trinity College.

== Career ==
He joined the Washington Redskins scouting department as an intern during the team's training camp in 1990. He joined the front-office of the newly-founded World League of American Football as a league scout before becoming the director of player personnel for the London Monarchs in 1991.

He spent one and a half seasons in the Canadian Football League (CFL) as a director of scouting and player personnel for the Ottawa Rough Riders and Saskatchewan Roughriders from 1993 to 1994.

Maccagnan was reunited with the Washington Redskins as a scout from 1995 to 2000. He then joined the Houston Texans shortly after Charley Casserly's appointment as general manager. He spent 15 years with the organization, starting as a coordinator of college scouting, rising in 2011 to director of college scouting.

Maccagnan was hired as the general manager of the New York Jets on January 13, 2015. Shortly following his hiring, Arizona Cardinals defensive coordinator Todd Bowles was hired as the new head coach. On December 29, 2017 it was announced that Maccagnan had signed a contract extension through 2020. He was fired by the Jets on May 15, 2019, and was replaced by Joe Douglas in June.

Maccagnan subsequently worked as a Football Evaluation Specialist for SūmerSports, and was a featured scout in SūmerSports’ NFL draft evaluation show, THE EVALUATION.

On May 6, 2026, the Philadelphia Eagles hired Maccagnan as a personnel executive.
