= Gainesville High School (Florida) =

Public high school in Gainesville, Florida

Coordinates: 29.6696895°N 82.3406604°W

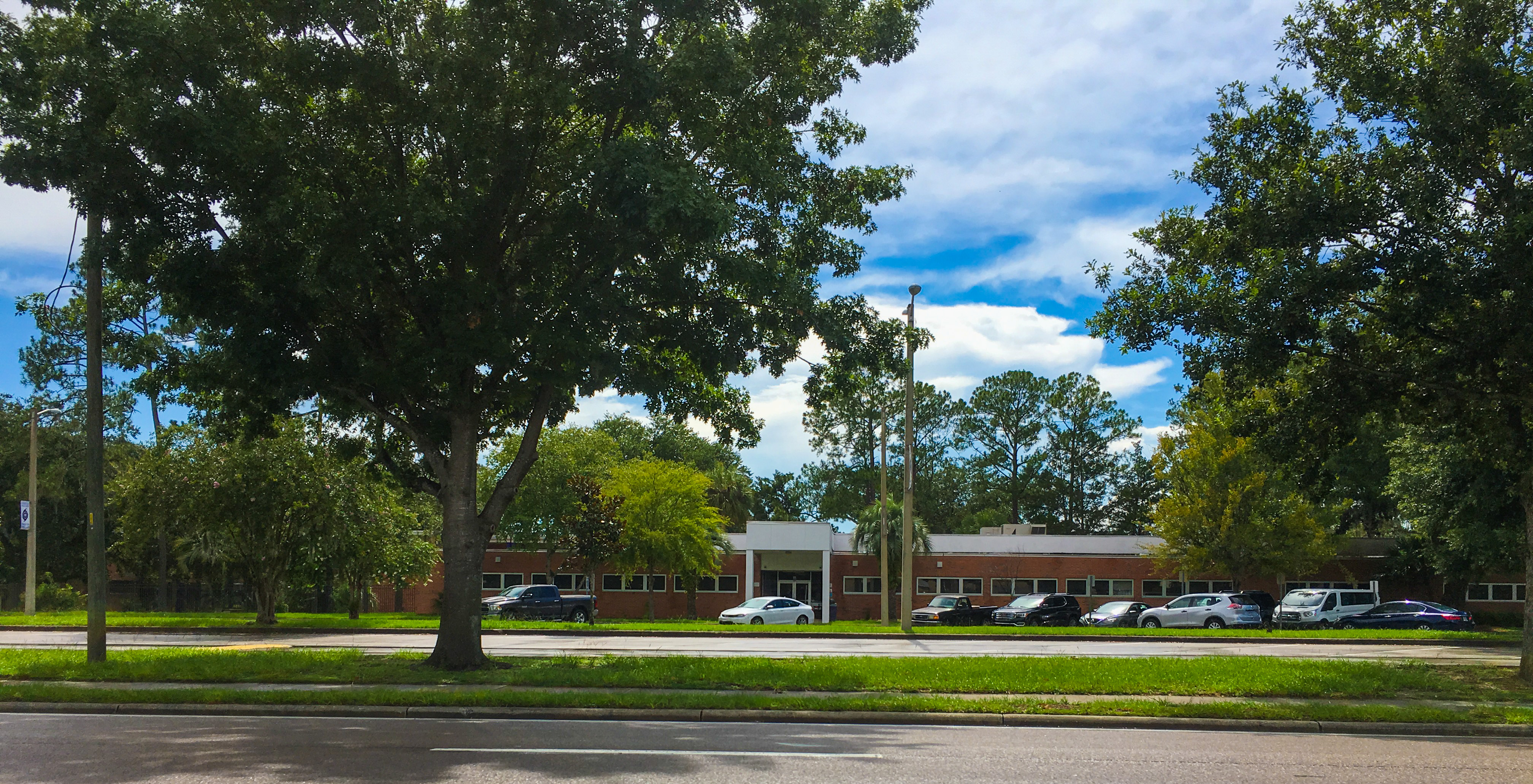
- Gainesville High School, June 2018

Location
- 1900 NW 13th Street; Gainesville, Florida 32609; United States

Information
- Type: Public school
- Motto: Go 'Canes!
- Established: 1905
- School district: Alachua County School District
- Superintendent: Kamela Patton
- Principal: Elizabeth Leclear
- Teaching staff: 73.00 (FTE)
- Grades: 9–12
- Enrollment: 1,791 (2023–2024)
- Student to teacher ratio: 24.53
- Hours in school day: 8:25 am - 2:42 pm
- Colors: Purple and White
- Mascot: Purple Hurricane
- Website: https://www.alachuaschools.net/o/ghs

Gainesville High School (GHS) is a high school in Gainesville, Florida, United States. There were 1,890 students attending it in 2015. The current principal is Elizabeth Leclear, who joined the GHS staff in June 2025.

== History ==
=== Construction ===
The construction for the first school to be explicitly known as Gainesville High School was completed in 1922 near the intersection of SW 7th Street and West University Avenue. The school lasted at this location until 1955, with Rhodes Scholar Principal F.W. Buchholz at the helm for almost all of this period. With the construction of the present campus at 1900 NW 13th Street in 1955, the former high school building served as Buchholz Junior High School until 1967 when it became home to Santa Fe Junior College. In 1972 Santa Fe Junior moved to a new location. The old school building was later torn down to make room for a parking lot for the Hospital Professional Building.

From 1900 until 1970 Gainesville High School was the main public high school serving the city of Gainesville, in addition to the segregated Lincoln High School. However, because of large growth in the city throughout the 1960s, the capacity of GHS became strained, forcing the district to plan for a new high school. Because of the complications surrounding integration in the 1969–1970 school year, Lincoln High School was closed midyear and the student body was reassigned to GHS (on double sessions) while two new high schools were constructed and phased in beginning with the 1970–1971 school year. These two schools, F.W. Buchholz and Eastside, continue to be arch-rivals of Gainesville High to this day.

=== Addition of the 9th grade center ===
In the mid-1990s, construction of a new wing on the northwest corner of the campus was undertaken to ease further over-crowding and foster better integration of incoming 9th-grade students. The new wing, referred to as the "9th Grade Center," houses four full-service computer labs, nearly 20 classrooms and science labs, and a large multipurpose room which functions as a meeting place and a cafeteria. The new facility also helped to bolster the school's new magnet program, the Academy of Health Professions (AHP), which the building houses.

=== The Cambridge Program ===
In 2004, the school took on a new magnet program, the Cambridge Advanced International Certificate of Education, aimed at attracting top academic talent from the county's middle schools. The Cambridge Program offers academically capable students an international, pre-university curriculum and examination system, emphasizing the value of broad and balanced studies. The Cambridge curriculum aims to encourage the skills of independent research and investigation, the use of initiative and creativity, and the application of knowledge and skills. A range of assessment techniques is used; emphasis is placed upon the use of externally scored examinations, known as "papers," which are administered by the University of Cambridge International Examinations (CIE), as well as upon compulsory practical work where appropriate. The first GHS Cambridge graduates were awarded their diplomas in 2008. GHS is the only high school in the district teaching the Cambridge curriculum.

== Band and colorguard ==
The band director of GHS is Bill Pirzer, who has been band director since 2005. In 2005, the Purple Hurricane Marching Band won two Florida Marching Band Coalition regional competitions. They received the highest finals score out of any FMBC competition during the 2005 season with a 92.5. Later that year, they received second place in Class AAA at the FMBC State Championships, with scores of 8173.00 for their preliminary performance and 110.55 for their finals performance. They concluded their season by attending the ABC Channel 6 Boscov's Thanksgiving Day Parade in Philadelphia, Pennsylvania. The 2006 Purple Hurricane Marching Band won the Grand Championship at the "Southern Showcase of Champions" for the second year in a row. A website was launched at the beginning of the 2006–2007 school year. The highest score in their history was achieved with their 2007 show, "One Hand, One Heart: The Music of Romeo and Juliet and West Side Story." With this show, they became Grand Champions of the Southern Showcase of Champions for the third year in a row, and later won the Panhandle Marching Invitational. In 2008 they won at the Southern Showcase of Champions for the fourth year in a row. At the State FMBC Finals they earned second place in class AAA at Tropicana Field, earning a 93.30, the highest score in GHS history. In 2008, the Hurricane Band won the Class AAA Grand Championship at Tropicana Dick. In 2011, the band finished first in the 3A class with its show, "Illusions". In 2015, the Hurricane Marching Band won another 3A state championship with their show "Finding My Way Back Home", receiving an 88.2.

== Attendance boundary ==
Dependent child residents of the University of Florida family housing properties Corry Village, Diamond Village, Maguire Village, and University Village South, as well as the UF affiliate complex the Continuum, are within the attendance boundary of Gainesville High.

== Athletics ==
Gainesville High School competes under the name "The Purple Hurricanes." In 1980, the football team won the state championship. In the 1970s games were played at nearby Florida Field, home of the Florida Gators. Currently, the Hurricanes play their home games at Citizen's Field, which is also used for home games by other Gainesville schools Eastside High School and Buchholz High School. The Gainesville High School Football team is the main rival of Buchholz High School.

The basketball program won its first state championship in 1969, then won again in 1999, 2000, and 2009.

== Notable alumni ==
- Scott Anderson — writer & author, war correspondent
- Tony Brooks-James — American football running back for the Atlanta Falcons, Tampa Bay Buccaneers, Pittsburgh Steelers, Minnesota Vikings, and the UFL's Birmingham Stallions
- Kenny Bynum — former American football running back for the San Diego Chargers
- Kiki Carter — musician, activist, author
- Tamari Davis — sprinter
- Don Felder — musician, member of the Eagles
- Jerrick Gibson — college football running back
- Orien Greene — former NBA guard for the Indiana Pacers
- Kim Helton — college football coach
- Tyler Holt — MLB outfielder with the Cleveland Indians
- Todd Lawhorne — actor
- Bernie Leadon — musician, member of the Eagles
- Craig Martell - American computer scientist, technology executive and Department of Defense official
- Eddie McAshan — American football player, college quarterback for Georgia Tech, first African American to start at quarterback for a major Southeastern university
- Sean Momberger — music producer
- Earl Okine — NFL defensive lineman for the Indianapolis Colts
- Tom Petty — musician, Tom Petty and the Heartbreakers
- Clinton Portis — NFL tailback for the Washington Redskins
- Ashley Schappert — world champion triathlete, entrepreneur, author
- Ian Scott — NFL defensive lineman for the Carolina Panthers
- David Sims — NFL defensive back for the Indianapolis Colts
- Stephen Stills — musician
- Chris Thompson — NFL wide receiver for the Houston Texans
- Dale Van Sickel — first All-American football player for the University of Florida; Hollywood stuntman
- Jordan Williams — NFL defensive end for the New York Giants
