= Wesley Johnson (American football) =

American football player (born 1991)

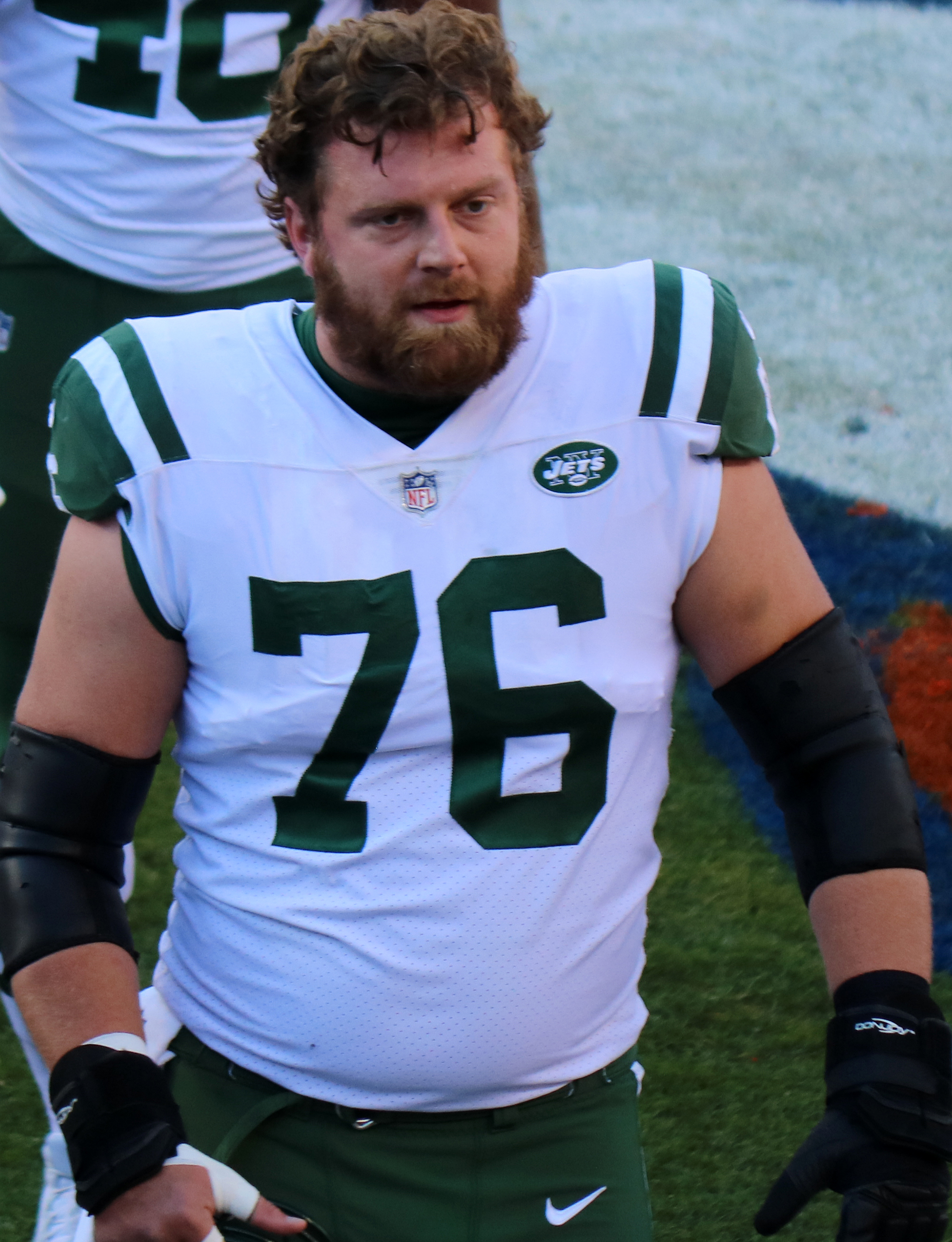
- Johnson with the New York Jets in 2017

No. 76, 73
- Position: Center

Personal information
- Born: January 9, 1991 (age 35); Nashville, Tennessee, U.S.
- Listed height: 6 ft 5 in (1.96 m)
- Listed weight: 295 lb (134 kg)

Career information
- High school: Montgomery Bell (Nashville)
- College: Vanderbilt
- NFL draft: 2014: 5th round, 173rd overall pick

Career history
- Pittsburgh Steelers (2014); New York Jets (2014–2017); Detroit Lions (2018)*; Miami Dolphins (2018); San Francisco 49ers (2019)*
- * Offseason or practice squad member only

Awards and highlights
- First-team All-SEC (2013)

Career NFL statistics
- Games played: 51
- Games started: 24
- Stats at Pro Football Reference

Wesley Vadnais Johnson (born January 9, 1991) is an American former professional football player who was a center in the National Football League (NFL). He was selected by the Pittsburgh Steelers in the fifth round of the 2014 NFL draft. He played college football for the Vanderbilt Commodores.

== Professional career ==
Johnson was one of 50 collegiate offensive linemen to attend the NFL Scouting Combine in Indianapolis, Indiana. He impressed scouts after completing all of the combine drills and finishing 11th out of all offensive tackles in the 40-yard dash. Johnson also tied for fifth among his position group in the vertical jump and finished 15th in the bench press. On March 21, 2014, Johnson chose to participate at Vanderbilt's pro day, along with Jonathan Krause, Jordan Matthews, Kenny Ladler, Andre Hal, and nine others. He opted to stand on his combine numbers and only performed positional drills for team representatives and scouts, that included head coaches Chip Kelly (Eagles) and Ken Whisenhunt (Titans).

Pre-draft measurables
Height	Weight	Arm length	Hand span	40-yard dash	10-yard split	20-yard split	20-yard shuttle	Three-cone drill	Vertical jump	Broad jump	Bench press
6 ft 5 in (1.96 m)	297 lb (135 kg)	33 1/8 in (0.84 m)	10 1/4 in (0.26 m)	5.11 s	1.73 s	2.96 s	4.64 s	7.40 s	29 in (0.74 m)	9 ft 3 in (2.82 m)	26 reps
All values from NFL Combine

=== Pittsburgh Steelers ===
The Pittsburgh Steelers selected Johnson in fifth round (173rd overall) in the 2014 NFL draft. He was the seventh center selected 2014.

On May 27, 2014, the Steelers signed Johnson to a four-year, $2.36 million contract that includes a signing bonus of $144,560.

Throughout training camp, he competed for a roster spot against David Snow, Bryant Browning, Chris Hubbard, Will Simmons, and Chris Elkins. Head coach Mike Tomlin named him the third-string left tackle and left guard behind Kelvin Beachum, Ramon Foster, Mike Adams and Chris Hubbard to start the regular season. His versatility and experience playing all offensive line positions in college helped him earn the roster spot, as he also served as the third string center behind Maurkice Pouncey and Cody Wallace. On October 12, 2014, Johnson was waived by the Steelers.

=== New York Jets ===
==== 2014 ====
Johnson was claimed off waivers by the New York Jets on October 13, 2014. Upon arrival, head coach Rex Ryan named Johnson the backup center behind Nick Mangold. Throughout his rookie season, Johnson did not appear in any games.

==== 2015 ====
He competed with Dakota Dozier and Dalton Freeman for the backup center job throughout training camp. On September 5, 2015, Johnson was waived by the Jets and re-signed to the practice squad. New head coach Todd Bowles named guard Dakota Dozier the backup center to Nick Mangold. On October 28, 2015, the New York Jets signed him to the active roster after it was apparent starting center Nick Mangold would miss the next game after suffering a neck injury.

On November 1, 2015, Johnson earned his first career start and made his official regular season debut in the Jets loss at the Oakland Raiders. He finished the 2015 season appearing in ten games and one start.

==== 2016 ====
Johnson competed with Kyle Friend for the backup center role throughout training camp. He maintained the role and was named the backup center to Mangold to start the 2016 season.

In Week 8, Johnson made his first start of the season during a 31-28 victory at the Cleveland Browns. He remained the starting center for the last eight games of the season after Nick Mangold was unable to play due to a recurring ankle injury. Mangold suffered an ankle injury in Week 7 against the Baltimore Ravens and was placed on injured reserve for the remainder of the season.

==== 2017 ====
Johnson was slated to be the starting center after the Jets released Nick Mangold on February 25, 2017, after having a successful run while replacing him while he was injured during the 2016 season.

On March 9, 2017, the Jets placed a second-round tender on Johnson and signed him to a one-year, $2.74 million contract.

Head coach Todd Bowles named Johnson the starting center ahead of Jonotthan Harrison. He started the Jets' season-opening 21-12 loss at the Buffalo Bills.

=== Detroit Lions ===
On March 29, 2018, Johnson signed with the Detroit Lions. He was released on September 1, 2018.

=== Miami Dolphins ===
On October 2, 2018, Johnson signed with the Miami Dolphins following an injury to Daniel Kilgore.

=== San Francisco 49ers ===
On May 7, 2019, Johnson a one-year deal with the San Francisco 49ers. He was released during final roster cuts on August 30, 2019.
