= Todd David Lawhorne =

American actor

- Born: Todd Lawhorne; March 4, 1975 (age 50); Fort Lauderdale, Florida
- Died: March 24, 2023; Saint Petersburg, FL
- Occupation: Actor
- Years active: 2000-2007

Todd David Lawhorne (born March 4, 1975, died March 24, 2023, in St.Petersburg, Florida) was an American retired theatre and film actor. Member of SAG-AFTRA and AEA. Best known for his starring role as Dalton Monroe in In Plain Sight and his supporting role as Phil the skinhead in The Bros, starring Shaquille O'Neal and Joey Fatone. In New York City, he starred in numerous plays off and off-off Broadway, including Twelfth Night at Lincoln Center and Laertes in Pineapple Project's production of Hamlet. Resident actor of the Children's Theatre at the New York Hall of Science. Todd attended Gainesville High School in Gainesville, Florida.
