= John Scott Jr. =

American football player and coach (born 1975)

Syracuse Orange Football
- Title: Co-defensive coordinator

Personal information
- Born: December 15, 1975 (age 50); Omaha, Nebraska, U.S.

Career information
- High school: Greer (Greer, South Carolina)
- College: Western Carolina (1995–1998)

Career history

Playing
- Greensboro Prowlers (2000–2001); Montreal Alouettes (2003)

Coaching
- Lexington (NC) West Davidson HS (2001) Defensive line coach; Louisiana–Lafayette (2002–2004) Graduate assistant; Norfolk State (2005) Defensive line coach; Western Carolina (2006–2007) Defensive end coach/Outside linebacker coach; Western Carolina (2008) Defensive line coach; Missouri State (2009) Defensive end coach; Georgia Southern (2010–2012) Special teams coordinator/Defensive line coach; Texas Tech (2013–2014) Defensive line coach; New York Jets (2015) Quality control coach; New York Jets (2016) Assistant Defensive line coach; Arkansas (2017–2018) Defensive line coach; South Carolina (2019) Defensive line coach; Penn State (2020–2021) Defensive line coach; Penn State (2022) Running game coordinator/Defensive line coach; Detroit Lions (2023) Defensive line coach; Clemson (2024–2025) Volunteer assistant; Syracuse Orange (2026–present) Assistant Head Coach/co-Defensive Coordinator/Defensive line coach

John Scott Jr. (born December 15, 1975) is an American football coach and former player. He is the defensive line coach and assistant head coach for the Syracuse Orange. Scott played professionally for the Greensboro Prowlers of the AF2 and the Montreal Alouettes of the CFL before entering the collegiate coaching ranks.

== Playing career ==
=== High school ===
Scott played for Greer High School in Greer, South Carolina. He graduated in 1995 after playing on the 1994 state championship team.

=== College ===
Scott lettered at Western Carolina at the defensive end position for four years from 1995 to 1998. In 1997, Scott led all defensive linemen in tackles, and was a second team All-Southern Conference selection. Scott graduated with a Bachelor's degree in communications in 2000.

=== Professional ===
Following his graduation from Western Carolina, Scott played three years of professional football. From 2000 to 2001, Scott played for the Greensboro Prowlers of the Af2 league and was named the team's defensive player of the year in 2000. In 2003, Scott participated in preseason camp for the Canadian Football League's Montreal Alouettes.

== Coaching career ==
Scott entered the coaching ranks in 2001 as a defensive line coach at West Davidson High School in Tyro, North Carolina. Following that, Scott accepted a graduate assistant position at Louisiana–Lafayette while earning a master's degree from 2002 to 2004. Subsequently, Scott spent one year as the defensive line coach for Norfolk State before returning to his alma mater Western Carolina to coach defensive ends and outside linebackers. He spent three seasons at Western Carolina before spending the 2009 season as the defensive ends coach for Missouri State.

After his stint at Missouri State, Scott accepted a position as the special teams and defensive line coach for Georgia Southern for three seasons. During his time with the Eagles, Scott mentored Brent Russell, who was an All-American all three seasons under him and finished as the program's all-time sack leader. Scott also influenced All-American Roderick Tinsley an All-Southern Conference selection John Douglas during his three seasons in Statesboro.

In January 2013, Scott was hired as the defensive line coach for Texas Tech under head coach Kliff Kingsbury. During his two seasons with the Red Raiders, Scott mentored All-Big 12, Kerry Hyder and Branden Jackson.

=== New York Jets ===
Scott was hired by the New York Jets, under head coach Todd Bowles, as a defensive quality control coach on February 11, 2015. He was promoted to assistant defensive line coach on February 9, 2016.

=== Arkansas Razorbacks ===
Scott was hired by the Arkansas Razorbacks and head coach Bret Bielema as the new defensive line coach on February 7, 2017, replacing Rory Segrest. He remained on staff in 2018.

=== South Carolina Gamecocks ===
On January 22, 2019, it was announced by head coach Will Muschamp that Scott was hired as the new defensive line coach at the University of South Carolina. Under Scott Jr.'s guidance, Javon Kinlaw was named first-team All-SEC by the coaches.

=== Penn State Nittany Lions ===
On February 8, 2020, Scott was announced as the defensive line coach for the Penn State Nittany Lions and head coach James Franklin.

=== Detroit Lions ===
The Detroit Lions hired Scott as their defensive line coach on February 27, 2023.

=== Syracuse Orange ===
The Syracuse Orange hired Scott as their assistant head coach, co-defensive coordinator, and defensive line coach on December 23, 2025.
