= Ashley Schappert =

American athlete, entrepreneur and film producer

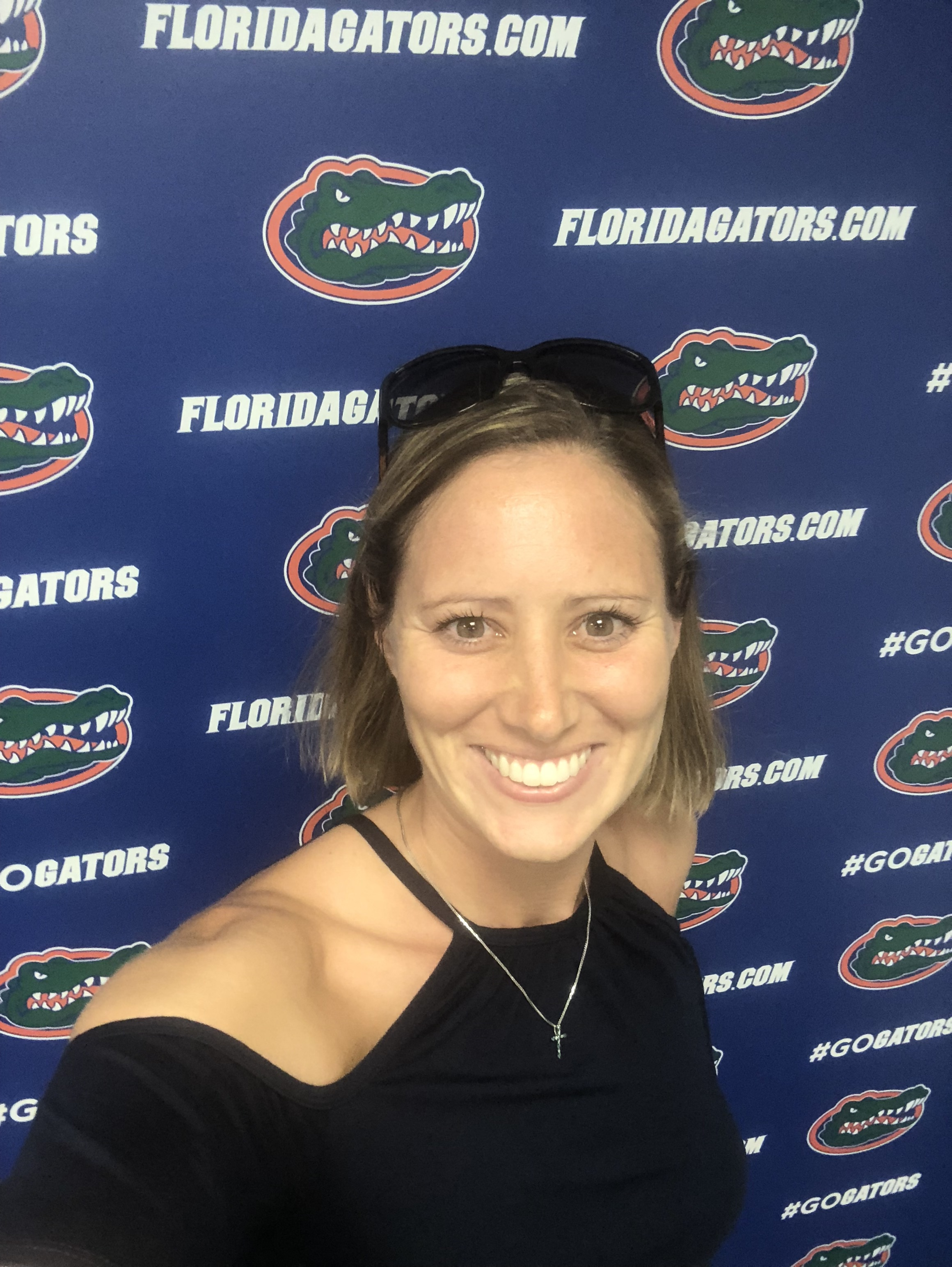

Personal information
- Full name: Ashley Carusone Schappert Betancourt
- National team: United States
- Born: March 27, 1985 (age 41) Gainesville, Florida
- Spouse: Jason Schappert (divorced)

Sport
- Sport: Swimming
- Strokes: Individual Medley, Butterfly
- College team: University of Florida

Ashley Carusone Betancourt (born March 27, 1985) is an athlete, entrepreneur, film producer and author. As an American competition swimmer she specialized in Individual Medley and butterfly events. She held 2 YMCA National SCY records in the 400IM and 200 butterfly and 4 YMCA National LCM records in the 200IM, 400IM, and 800 freestyle. Ashley competed in the 2004 and 2008 Olympic trials for the University of Florida. Ashley won the International Triathlon Union World Championships for her age group (women's 16–19) in 2001, 2 time Pan American Champion and 13 time USAT All-American.

== Personal life ==
Schappert was born in Gainesville, Florida, in 1985. She is a 2003 graduate of Gainesville High School and was Sun Swimmer of the Year in 2003. She was a 4 time FHSAA state champion. Schappert attended the University of Florida, where she competed for coach Greg Troy's Florida Gators swim team for four years. She was a four-time SEC Academic Honor Roll. She was a 4 time NCAA qualifier and received NCAA Honorable Mention All-American (400 IM). Ashley competed in swimming as well as triathlon while in college. She won the Age Group ITU World Championships in 2001

Ashley was married to Jason Schappert. They divorced in 2021.

== Sports ==
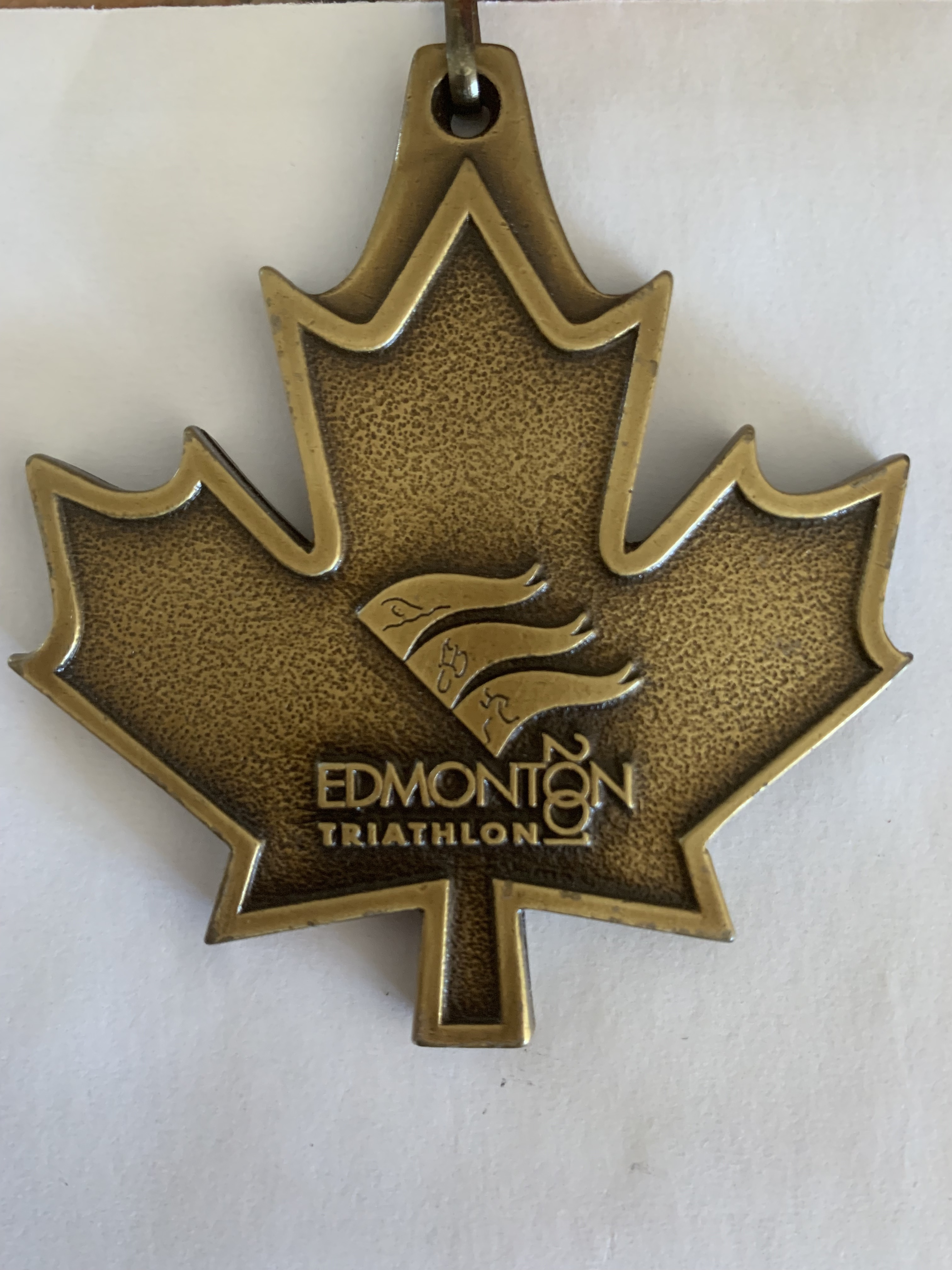
2001 World Championship Gold Medal

Won the 2001 Under 20 Triathlon World Championships in Edmonton Canada. At barely 16 she beat the swim time of every person at the World Championships and won her division by a whopping 1:30.

Nickelodeon Games and Sports featured Ashley Carusone and Manuel Huerta in an episode of Splash TV highlighting their success in triathlon and educating children on how a triathlon works.

After finishing her college eligibility Ashley planned to race as a professional triathlete. While competing in a triathlon, she was hit by a car breaking her jaw.

After several years of rehab and retraining Ashley started competing again. Triathlon comeback and retirement ended at the 2009 USAT National Championships. After battling injuries Carusone competed in her first national championships back after winning her world championship she finished fifth qualifying for the ITU World Championships.

== Business ==
Ashley was the Executive producer of Jason Schappert's Flying Again which was released in 2016, featuring rusty pilots who have not flown for two to thirty years, with Jason Schappert. This was then featured on the TV series The Aviators.

Ashley and then-husband Jason Schappert's company was named one of Grow Florida's '2017 Florida Companies to Watch Honorees' and has been ranked three times on the INC 5000 list of fastest growing companies, ranking No. 230 in 2017, No. 578 in 2018 and No. 896 in 2019. In 2018 and 2019 they maintained growth and landed No. 578 in 2018 and No. 896 in 2019 on the INC 5000 list.

In 2020, Ashley released her first book Membership Site Success, which quickly became a best seller.

== Bibliography ==
- Membership Site Success (2020); ISBN 979-8639637599
- The Female Entrepreneur's Playbook (2021); ASIN B09B5DRT4H
- Uncommon Results: Secrets & Strategies of High Performance Entrepreneurs (2022); ASIN B09T3SGW7C
