= Robby Brown =

American football player and coach (born 1980)

Personal information
- Born: July 15, 1980 (age 46); Blairsville, Georgia, U.S.

Career information
- High school: Union County (GA)
- College: Chattanooga (2001); Georgia Military (2002); Georgia Tech (2003–2004)

Career history
- Troy (2005–2006) Graduate assistant; Southwest Baptist (2007) Offensive coordinator; Henderson State (2008) Offensive coordinator & quarterbacks coach; Valdosta State (2009–2012) Offensive coordinator & quarterbacks coach; Northwestern State (2013) Offensive coordinator & quarterbacks coach; South Alabama (2014) Running backs coach; New York Jets (2015–2016) Offensive quality control; New York Jets (2017–2018) Defensive assistant; West Virginia (2019) Special assistant to head coach & senior offensive analyst; Miami Dolphins (2020) Quarterbacks coach

Awards and highlights
- NCAA Division II champion (2012)

Robert Parks Brown (born July 15, 1980) is an American football coach who was most recently the quarterbacks coach for the Miami Dolphins of the National Football League (NFL). Prior to that, he was a special assistant to the head coach and the senior offensive analyst at West Virginia University.

== College career ==
Brown was a quarterback at Georgia Tech for the 2003 and 2004 seasons after previously spending a season at the Georgia Military College. He played in the Yellow Jackets 2003 and 2004 bowl games, where Georgia Tech won both.

== Coaching career ==
=== Early career ===
Brown started his coaching career at Troy as a graduate assistant under Tony Franklin. He then accepted a position on the Southwest Baptist coaching staff as an offensive coordinator for one season in 2007, before joining the Henderson State coaching staff as the offensive coordinator and quarterbacks coach in 2008.

He was hired to be the offensive coordinator and quarterbacks coach at Valdosta State in 2009, and was the offensive coordinator of the Blazers in 2012 when they won the NCAA Division II Football Championship, putting up over 40 points and 460 yards a game.

Brown was named the offensive coordinator & quarterbacks coach at Northwestern State in 2013, only spending one season there before spending the 2014 season as the running backs coach at South Alabama.

=== New York Jets ===
Brown was initially hired as an offensive quality control coach by the Jets in 2015, working closely with the wide receivers. He switched to a defensive assistant with the Jets in 2017, where he worked with the outside linebackers. While he was initially retained by Adam Gase after the firing of Todd Bowles, Brown chose to accept a position on the coaching staff at West Virginia.

=== West Virginia ===
Brown was hired to be a special assistant to the head coach and senior offensive analyst at West Virginia in 2019 on Neal Brown's inaugural staff.

=== Miami Dolphins ===
Brown was hired to be the quarterbacks coach for the Miami Dolphins in 2020, reuniting with his former college head coach, Chan Gailey. He missed the team's weeks 9 and 10 games against the Arizona Cardinals and Los Angeles Chargers on November 8 and November 15, 2020, in accordance with COVID-19 protocols. He was let go after the 2020 season following Gailey's resignation.
