= Tony Brooks-James =

American football player (born 1994)

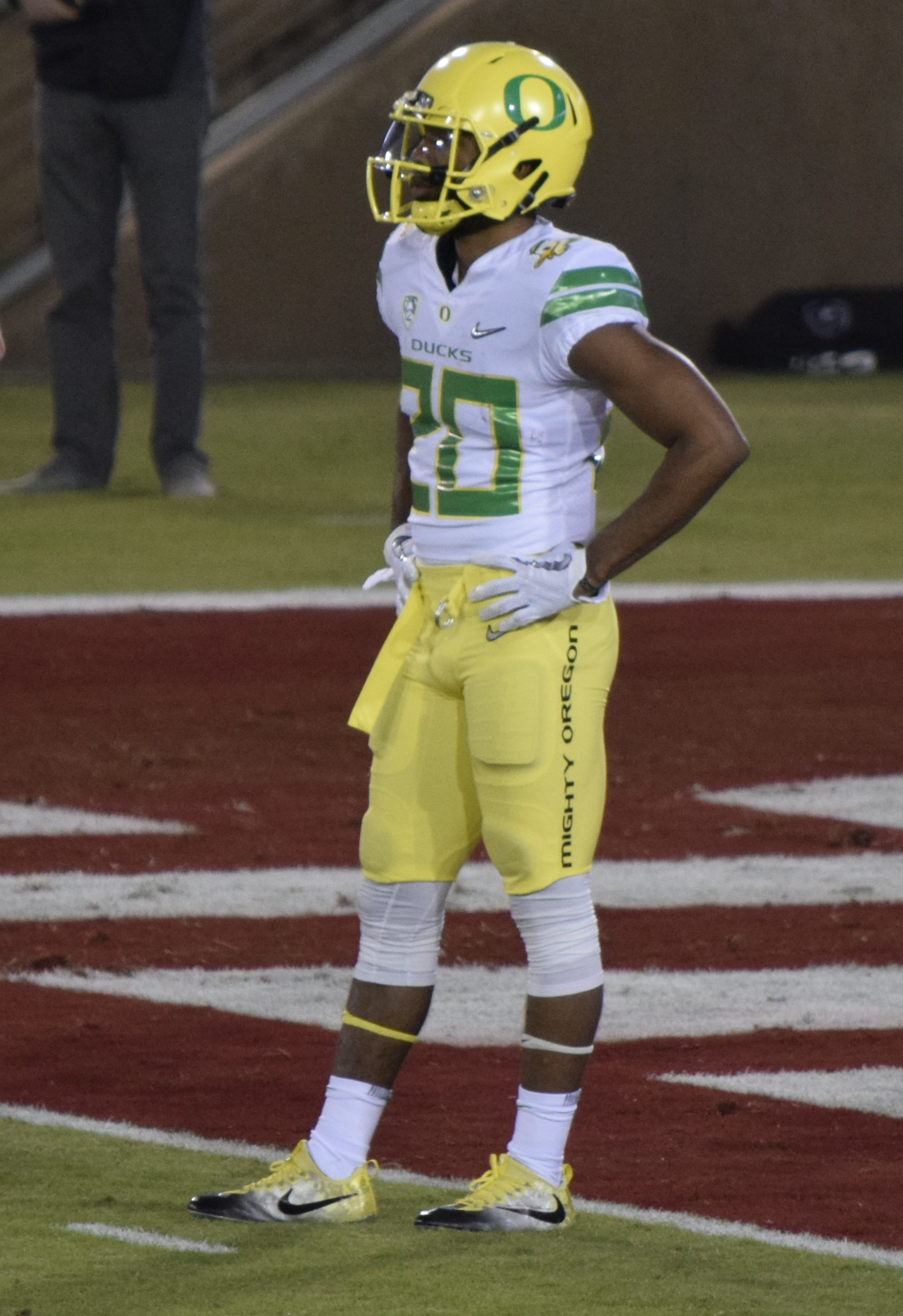
- Brooks-James with the Oregon Ducks in 2017

No. 20
- Position: Running back

Personal information
- Born: December 6, 1994 (age 31); Gainesville, Florida, U.S.
- Listed height: 5 ft 9 in (1.75 m)
- Listed weight: 190 lb (86 kg)

Career information
- High school: Gainesville
- College: Oregon
- NFL draft: 2019: undrafted

Career history
- Atlanta Falcons (2019)*; Tampa Bay Buccaneers (2019)*; Pittsburgh Steelers (2019); Minnesota Vikings (2019–2020)*; Atlanta Falcons (2020); Pittsburgh Steelers (2021)*; Birmingham Stallions (2022)
- * Offseason or practice squad member only

Awards and highlights
- USFL champion (2022); Second-team All-Pac-12 (2016)

Career NFL statistics
- Rushing yards: 11
- Rushing average: 1.0
- Return yards: 32
- Stats at Pro Football Reference

Tony Brooks-James (born December 6, 1994) is an American former professional football player who was a running back in the National Football League (NFL). He played college football for the Oregon Ducks.

== College career ==
Brooks-James played four seasons for the Oregon Ducks. He finished his collegiate career with 3,302 all-purpose yards (1,863 rushing, 392 receiving and 1,047 on kick returns) and 21 total touchdowns (18 rushing, two receiving and one kick return).

== Professional career ==
=== Atlanta Falcons (first stint) ===
Brooks-James was brought in for a rookie mini camp invite, he impressed and signed with the Atlanta Falcons as an undrafted free agent on May 11, 2019. He was waived at the end of training camp.

=== Tampa Bay Buccaneers ===
Brooks-James was signed to the practice squad of the Tampa Bay Buccaneers of September 2, 2019. He was waived on October 8, 2019.

=== Pittsburgh Steelers (first stint) ===
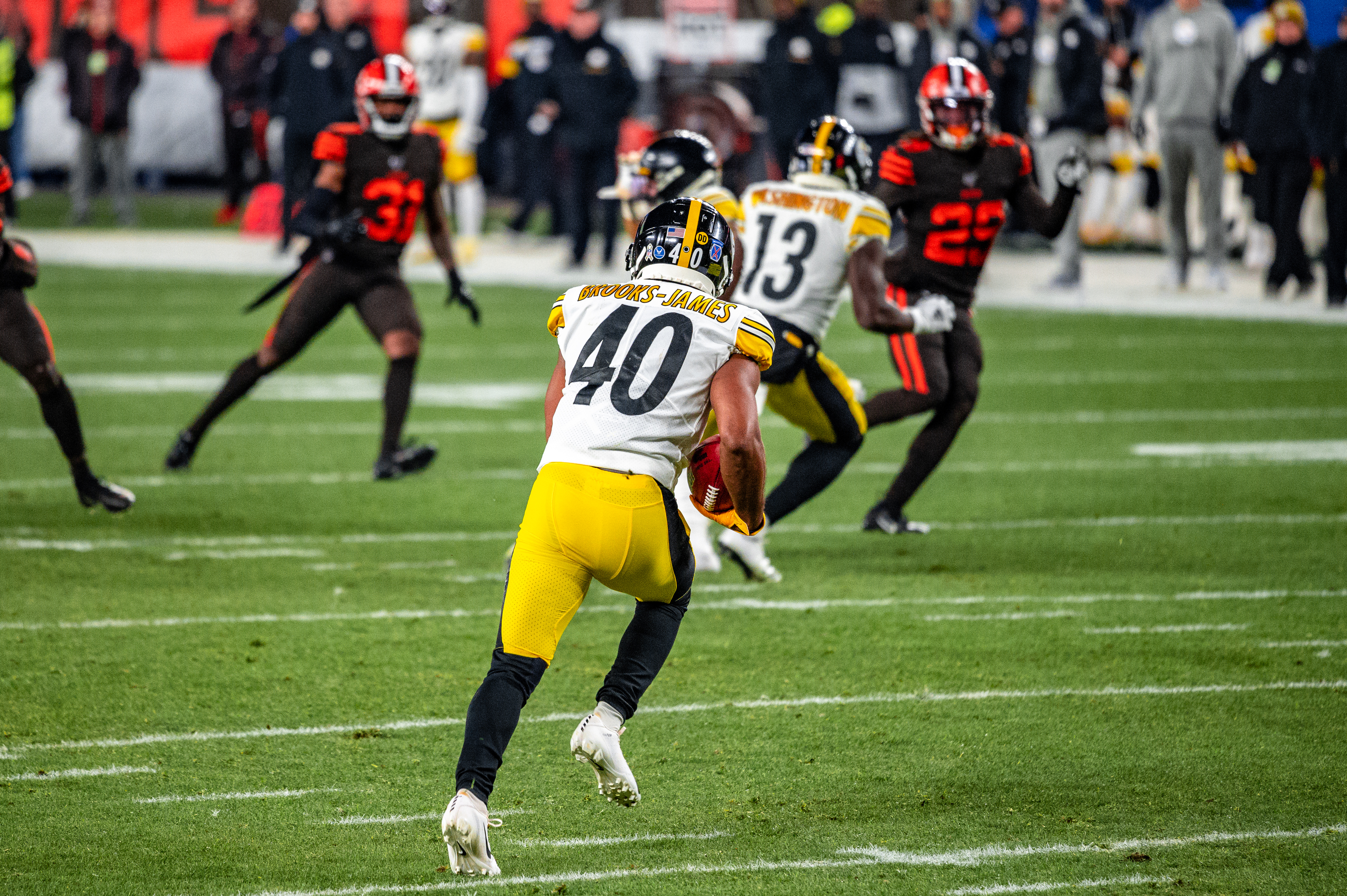
Brooks-James in a game against the Cleveland Browns in 2019

Brooks-James was signed to the Steelers practice squad on October 15, 2019. He was promoted to the active roster on November 2 and made his NFL debut the next day. He was released on November 16.

=== Minnesota Vikings ===
Brooks-James was signed to the Minnesota Vikings practice squad on December 11, 2019. He signed a reserve/future contract with the Vikings on January 12, 2020. He was waived on August 8, 2020, but re-signed a week later. He was waived on September 2, 2020.

=== Atlanta Falcons (second stint) ===
On November 23, 2020, Brooks-James was signed to the Falcons practice squad. He was elevated to the active roster on November 28 for the team's week 12 game against the Las Vegas Raiders, and reverted to the practice squad after the game. He signed a reserve/future contract on January 4, 2021. He was released on July 26, 2021.

=== Pittsburgh Steelers (second stint) ===
On August 3, 2021, Brooks-James was signed by the Pittsburgh Steelers. He was waived on August 28, 2021.

=== Birmingham Stallions ===
Brooks-James was selected in the 27th round of the 2022 USFL draft by the Birmingham Stallions. On March 8, 2023, Brooks-James was released by the Stallions.
