= Jason Schappert =

American pilot and entrepreneur

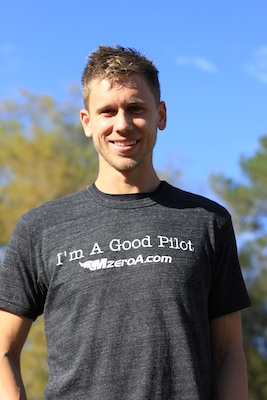
- Born: May 23, 1988 (age 37); Baltimore, Maryland
- Occupations: Founder of MzeroA.com, entrepreneur
- Years active: 2007–present
- Height: 6’4

Jason Schappert is an American pilot and entrepreneur. Schappert is a CFII and ATP rated pilot, founder of MzeroA.com, and author of eight aviation flight training books. Schappert was named AOPA's Top Collegiate Flight Instructor in 2008, Outstanding Flight Instructor of 2014 and 2015, has amassed over 8000 hours of in-flight instruction since learning how to fly, and produces MzeroA.com's Online Ground School.

== Personal life ==
In 2007, Schappert, as an eighteen-year-old aviation student at Bridgewater State University in Massachusetts, saved a drowning man from the icy water of Long Pond. He received a Carnegie Medal and was written into the congressional record. He was named National Intercollegiate Flying Association (NIFA) Top Collegiate Flight Instructor in 2008 and 2012. In 2009, he created a program called Future Pilots Flight Academy for aviation-minded youth in conjunction with the Discovery Science Center.

Jason was married to Ashley Schappert, divorcing in 2021. Later, Jason was married to Magda Schappert.

== Career ==
In 2010, Schappert, teamed with Swiss flyer Vincent Lambercy, flew a Cessna 150 on a round-trip Flight Across America from Daytona Beach, Florida to Catalina Island, California and back. Funds raised from the trip were used to promote general aviation.

Schappert and his team flew around the U.S. in 2014 on the Good Pilot Tour, one of their many stops was at the Southeast Aviation Expo.

He was named an AOPA Regional Outstanding Flight Instructor of the year in 2014, 2015, 2016 and 2017.

His company, MzeroA, was named one of Grow Florida's '2017 Florida Companies to Watch Honorees'. MzeroA.com was named in the Inc. 500's 2017 top growing private companies as #230. Schappert was then asked to speak at Tampa Techstars Start Up week on the topic titled “How I Turned an Online Course Into an Inc 500 Company” In 2019 MzeroA was named Inc Magazines "Best Place To Work"

Schappert produced the Flying Again film featuring rusty pilots who have not flown for two to thirty years. This was then featured on the TV series The Aviators. In the movie Schappert flew with Ariel Tweto from the Discovery Chanel series Flying Wild Alaska in an effort to get her back FAA current in her aviation career.

In 2018, Schappert and MzeroA we're named the 108th most entrepreneurial company in America.

In 2019, Schappert’s company MzeroA tied for the top Online Ground School led by its interactive learning style.

In 2021, Schappert partnered with the University of Arizona Forbes School of Business and Technology to deliver his aviation training courses making MzeroA the largest provider of crewed and uncrewed aircraft training.

Schappert has a flight training YouTube channel where he regularly posts flight training videos geared towards knowledge and safety.

== Bibliography ==
- Pass Your Private Pilot Checkride 2.0 (ISBN 978-1456310103) (2010)
- Pass Your Instrument Pilot Checkride (ISBN 978-1456328719) (2011)
- Aviation Acronyms (Pilots Recipe for Success Series) (ISBN 978-1460974865) (2011)
- The FAR/AIM in Plain English (ISBN 978-1479118342) (2012)
- Inflight Emergencies (ISBN 978-0615687858) (2012)
- The Airplane Flying Handbook (ISBN 978-0615628455) (2012)
- Pilots Handbook of Aeronautical Knowledge (ISBN 978-0615623184) (2012)
- The Secret to Perfect Landings (ISBN 978-0615841069) (2013)
- The Private Pilot Blueprint: A Roadmap To Your Private Pilot Certificate (ISBN 978-0692231104) (2014)
- Aviation Mastery ISBN 9798985397017 (2022)

== Filmography ==
Year	Title	Role	Notes
2015	Flying Again Movie	Himself	Flight instructor
