= Bryan Johnson (linebacker) =

American football player (born 1988)

Profile
- Position: Linebacker

Personal information
- Born: August 13, 1988 (age 38); Bellport, New York
- Listed height: 6 ft 4 in (1.93 m)
- Listed weight: 250 lb (113 kg)

Career information
- College: West Texas A&M
- NFL draft: 2014: undrafted

Career history
- Buffalo Bills (2014); New York Jets (2015)*
- * Offseason or practice squad member only

Career NFL statistics
- Tackles: --
- Quarterback sacks: --
- Interceptions: --
- Forced fumbles: --
- Stats at Pro Football Reference

Bryan Johnson (born August 13, 1988) is an American football linebacker who is currently a free agent. He was signed by the Buffalo Bills as an undrafted free agent in 2014.

== College career ==
Johnson played in 28 games with 10 starts while at West Texas A&M University and he tallied 89 tackles, 16.5 tackles for a loss, eight sacks, eight QB hurries, two fumbles forced and two fumbles recovered. Johnson played at Nassau Community College in Garden City, New York before West Texas A&M and led the Lions to a 19–2 record while being named a two-time All-Conference selection.

== Professional career ==
=== New York Jets ===
Johnson was signed by the New York Jets on August 25, 2015. He was waived on August 30.

== See also ==
- List of Buffalo Bills players
