= Jordan Williams (linebacker, born 1993) =

American football player (born 1993)

No. 69, 79
- Position: Linebacker

Personal information
- Born: March 23, 1993 (age 33); Gainesville, Florida, U.S.
- Listed height: 6 ft 4 in (1.93 m)
- Listed weight: 262 lb (119 kg)

Career information
- High school: Gainesville
- College: Tennessee (2011–2014)
- NFL draft: 2015: undrafted

Career history
- New York Jets (2015)*; Miami Dolphins (2015–2016); New York Giants (2016–2018); Tennessee Titans (2019)
- * Offseason or practice squad member only

Career NFL statistics
- Total tackles: 2
- Stats at Pro Football Reference

Jordan Cornell Williams (born March 23, 1993) is an American former professional football player who was a linebacker for the Miami Dolphins and New York Giants of the National Football League (NFL). He played his senior season of high school football at Gainesville High School in Gainesville, Florida, and played college football for the Tennessee Volunteers for four years. Williams played in 44 games, of which he started 21, during his college career, recording 66 tackles and 6.5 sacks. After going undrafted in the 2015 NFL draft, he signed with the New York Jets and spent time on the team's practice squad before being released in September 2015. He was then signed by the Dolphins, where he spent time on both the practice squad and active roster from 2015 to 2016. Williams played in one game for the Dolphins. He was on the Giants' practice squad, active roster, and injured reserve from 2016 to 2018, and appeared in one game for them as well. He joined the Tennessee Titans in 2019 but spent the entire season on injured reserve, and was released in 2020.

== Early life ==
Jordan Cornell Williams was born on March 23, 1993, in Gainesville, Florida. He played his first three years of high school football at P. K. Yonge Developmental Research School in Gainesville. During his junior year, he broke his collarbone in the fifth game and missed the rest of the season. While at P. K. Yonge, he spent time at middle linebacker, nose tackle and tight end.

After his junior year at P. K. Yonge, Williams transferred to play his senior year of football at Gainesville High School in Gainesville. In his senior season in 2010, he played defensive end and tight end while also spending some time at long snapper. In 2010, he was named to both the Super 11 team and Class 5A-AA first-team of the Gainesville Sun. Gainesville High finished with an 11–2 record and advanced to the state semifinals. Williams played in the Florida Athletic Coaches Association (FACA)/Reebok North-South All Star Football Classic on December 22, 2010. He played at Gainesville High with future Tennessee teammate Trevarris Saulsberry.

In the class of 2011, he was rated a three-star recruit by Rivals.com, Scout.com, ESPN.com and 247Sports.com. He was also rated the No. 42 strongside defensive end in the country by Rivals.com, the No. 45 defensive end in the country by Scout.com, the No. 61 defensive end in the country by ESPN.com, and the No. 34 strongside defensive end in the country by 247Sports.com. Williams was also rated both a three-star recruit and the No. 40 strongside defensive end in the country on 247Sports.com's composite rating, which takes into account the ratings of all the other major recruiting services in the country.

He committed to play college football for the Tennessee Volunteers in October 2010. He also received offers from other schools, some of which included Arkansas, NC State, Oregon, South Florida, Vanderbilt, Syracuse, Maryland, Duke, Louisville, Iowa State, Troy, UCF, Michigan State and Marshall.

== College career ==
Williams played for the Tennessee Volunteers of the University of Tennessee from 2011 to 2014. He majored in Arts & Sciences at Tennessee. He was a recipient of the Horne Athletic Scholarship.

He played in nine games his freshman year in 2011 as a defensive end, recording four tackles and a sack.

He was moved to jack linebacker his sophomore season in 2012. Williams appeared in ten games, of which he started in half of them, and totaled two sacks and 17 tackles, four of which were tackles for loss. In April 2012, he was one of four recipients of the team's John Stucky Award, which is given to the "player who shows the most dedication and work discipline to improve strength as selected by the strength and conditioning staff."

Under a new head coach in Butch Jones, Williams was shifted back to defensive end for 2013 and played in 12 games, with three starts. He recorded 1.5 sacks and 18 tackles, 1.5 of which were tackles for loss. He was named to the 2013 Fall SEC Academic Honor Roll.

Williams moved to defensive tackle his senior year in 2014. He played in 13 games, all starts, and totaled two sacks, four pass breakups and 27 tackles, four of which were tackles for loss. He was named to the 2014 Fall SEC Academic Honor Roll. He played in the 2015 Medal of Honor Bowl as part of the National Team.

Throughout his college career, Williams played in 44 games and started 21 of them. He recorded career totals of 6.5 sacks and 66 tackles, 10.5 of which were tackles for loss.

== Professional career ==
Pre-draft measurables
Height	Weight	Arm length	Hand span	40-yard dash	10-yard split	20-yard split	20-yard shuttle	Three-cone drill	Vertical jump	Broad jump	Bench press
6 ft 4 1/2 in (1.94 m)	289 lb (131 kg)	31 5/8 in (0.80 m)	10 in (0.25 m)	4.98 s	1.80 s	2.92 s	4.45 s	7.61 s	30 in (0.76 m)	9 ft 8 in (2.95 m)	22 reps
All values from Tennessee's Pro Day

Williams was rated the 54th best defensive end in the 2015 NFL draft by NFLDraftScout.com.

Williams signed with the New York Jets in May 2015 after going undrafted in the 2015 draft. He was released by the Jets on September 5 and signed to the team's practice squad the following day. He was released by the Jets on September 22, 2015.

Williams was signed to the Miami Dolphins' practice squad on October 6, 2015. He was promoted to the active roster on December 5. He made his NFL debut and only appearance of the 2015 season on December 6 against the Baltimore Ravens, playing four snaps on defense and four snaps on special teams. He was released by the Dolphins on December 26 and signed to the team's practice squad three days later. Williams signed a reserve/future contract with the Dolphins in January 2016. He was released by the team on September 3 and signed to the Dolphins' practice squad the next day. He was released by the Dolphins on September 20, 2016.

On December 6, 2016, the New York Giants signed Williams to their practice squad. He signed a reserve/future contract with the Giants on January 9, 2017. On September 2, 2017, he was waived by the Giants and was signed to the practice squad the next day. Williams was promoted to the active roster on November 1. He made his only appearance of the 2017 season on November 5 against the Los Angeles Rams, recording one solo tackle and one assisted tackle while playing 11 snaps on defense and 16 snaps on special teams. He was waived by the Giants on November 7 and was re-signed to the practice squad. Williams signed a reserve/future contract with the Giants on January 1, 2018. On September 1, 2018, he was waived/injured by the Giants due to a hip/shoulder injury and reverted to injured reserve the next day. He became a free agent after the 2018 season.

On August 1, 2019, Williams signed with the Tennessee Titans. He was waived/injured on August 12 due to an undisclosed injury and reverted to injured reserve the next day. He spent the entire 2019 season on injured reserve. He was released by the Titans on July 28, 2020.

== Personal life ==
Williams' father, Keith, was a defensive lineman at Florida in the mid-1980s, was selected by the Minnesota Vikings in the 12th round of the 1987 NFL draft, and later played for the Chicago Bruisers, Dallas Texans and Orlando Predators of the Arena Football League from 1988 to 1991. Williams's sister, Janine, played volleyball at Florida and UCF. He held the first annual Jordan Williams Skills Camp on July 14, 2016.
