= Durell Eskridge =

American gridiron football player (born 1991)

No. 46
- Position: Safety

Personal information
- Born: December 17, 1991 (age 34); Miami, Florida, U.S.
- Listed height: 6 ft 3 in (1.91 m)
- Listed weight: 220 lb (100 kg)

Career information
- High school: West Little River (FL) Miami Central
- College: Syracuse
- NFL draft: 2015: undrafted

Career history
- New York Jets (2015)*; Arizona Cardinals (2015–2016); Toronto Argonauts (2017–2018)*
- * Offseason or practice squad member only
- Stats at Pro Football Reference
- Stats at CFL.ca

Durell Eskridge (born December 17, 1991) is an American former professional football safety. He played college football at Syracuse University. Eskridge signed with the New York Jets as an undrafted free agent in 2015.

== Early life ==
Eskridge attended Miami Central High School where he helped the football team to the 2010 6A State Championship with a record of 12–1. He was ranked second among the national rankings for both wide receiver and safety in his senior season.

Eskridge redshirted in the freshman year at Syracuse and was a starter all games during his junior year. He declared early after two seasons of leading the Syracuse defense.

== Professional career ==
=== New York Jets ===
On May 2, 2015, Eskridge signed with the New York Jets following the conclusion of the 2015 NFL draft.

=== Arizona Cardinals ===
The Arizona Cardinals signed Eskridge to their practice squad on October 14, 2015. Then later was moved to active roster December 22, 2015. On January 26, 2016, Eskridge signed a futures contract with the Arizona Cardinals.

On August 15, 2016, Eskridge was waived/injured by the Cardinals and was placed on injured reserve. He was released from injured reserve on October 24, 2016.

=== Toronto Argonauts ===
On May 11, 2017, Eskridge signed with the Toronto Argonauts of the Canadian Football League. However, he was released before the start of the season. He signed with the Argonauts again on April 18, 2018. He was released on May 1, 2018.
