= The Aviators =

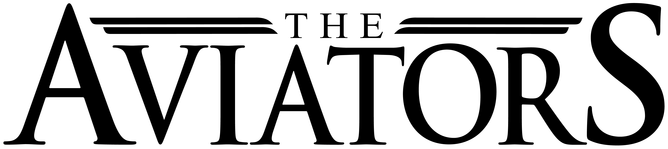
- Genre: Commentary
- Written by: Andrew Johnston
- Directed by: Anthony Nalli
- Starring: Anthony Nalli; Kurtis Arnold; Sara Rependa; Peter Knize
- Narrated by: Anthony Nalli
- Country of origin: Canada
- Original language: English
- No. of seasons: 8
- No. of episodes: 87

Production
- Executive producer: Anthony Nalli
- Running time: 30 minutes

Original release
- Network: Global Television Network; CHEK-TV
- Release: September 4, 2010

The Aviators is a weekly Canadian television docuseries about aviation. Hosted by Anthony Nalli, the program is a behind-the-scenes look at airplanes and the people who fly or work with them.

The series came from a column of aviation stories Nalli was writing, called “Close Calls.” The series premiered on the Global Television Network Saturday, September 4, 2010. It could also be seen on CHEK-TV in Canada and has been distributed to all 356 Public Broadcasting Stations in the United States for broadcast in numerous markets starting in September 2010. The series was broadcast overseas on Discovery Channel Asia starting in spring 2010. The series became available on Hulu in February 2011. It began airing its ninth season in May 2021.

In its third season, Mötley Crüe lead singer Vince Neil was featured trying to earn his pilot's license.
