= Todd Bowles =

American football player and coach (born 1963)

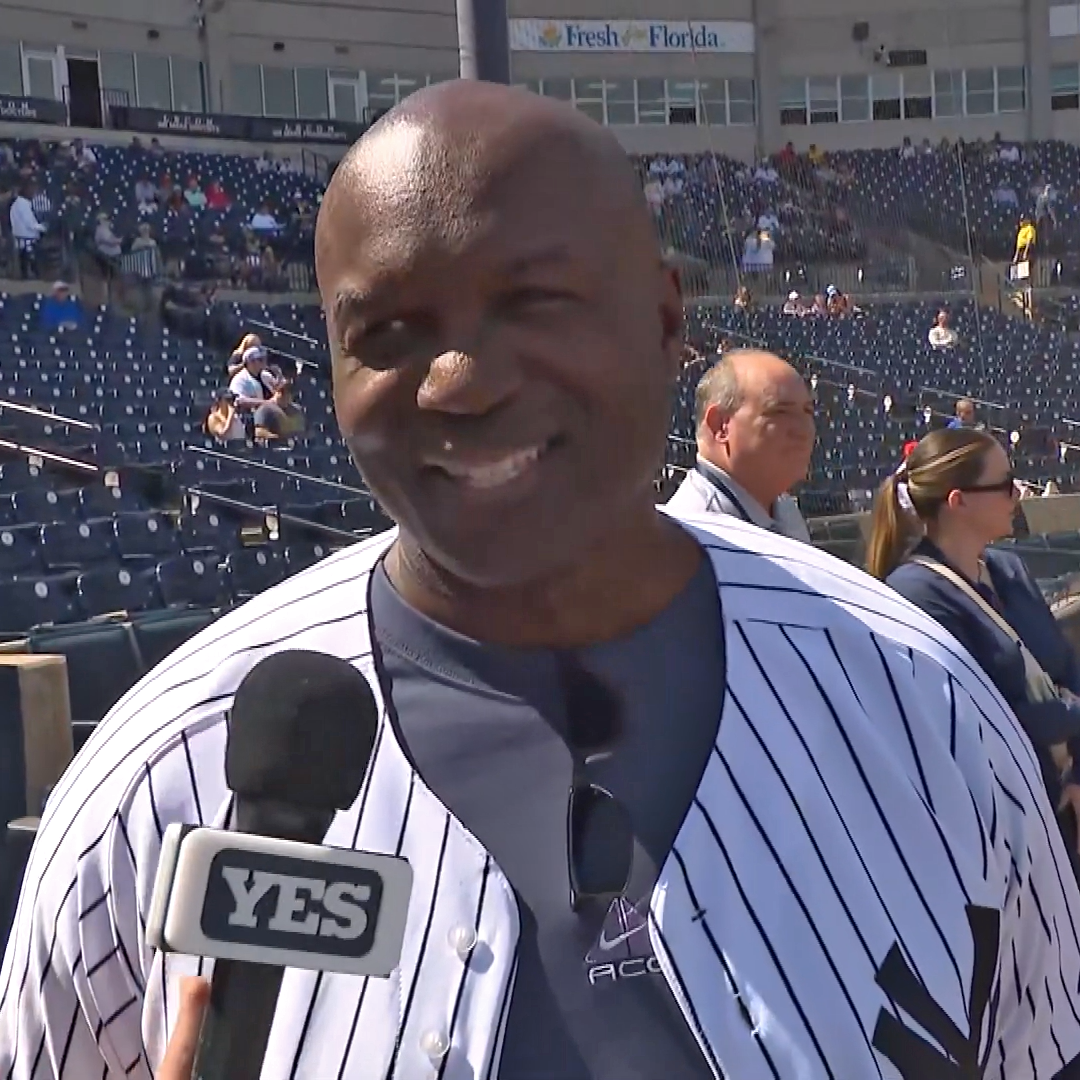
- Bowles in 2025

Tampa Bay Buccaneers
- Title: Head coach

Personal information
- Born: November 18, 1963 (age 63); Elizabeth, New Jersey, U.S.
- Listed height: 6 ft 2 in (1.88 m)
- Listed weight: 203 lb (92 kg)

Career information
- Position: Safety (No. 23, 22)
- High school: Elizabeth
- College: Temple (1982–1985)
- NFL draft: 1986: undrafted

Career history

Playing
- Washington Redskins (1986–1990); San Francisco 49ers (1991); Washington Redskins (1992–1993)

Coaching
- Morehouse (1997) Defensive coordinator & secondary coach; Grambling State (1998–1999) Defensive coordinator & secondary coach; New York Jets (2000) Secondary coach; Cleveland Browns (2001–2004); Secondary–nickel package coach (2001–2003); Secondary coach (2004); Dallas Cowboys (2005–2007) Secondary coach; Miami Dolphins (2008–2011); Assistant head coach & secondary coach (2008–2011); Interim head coach & secondary coach (2011); Philadelphia Eagles (2012); Secondary coach (2012); Interim defensive coordinator & secondary coach (2012); Arizona Cardinals (2013–2014) Defensive coordinator; New York Jets (2015–2018) Head coach; Tampa Bay Buccaneers (2019–present); Defensive coordinator (2019–2021); Head coach (2022–present)

Operations
- Green Bay Packers (1995–1996) Player personnel staff

Awards and highlights
- As a player: Super Bowl champion (XXII); First-team All-East (1984); As an executive: Super Bowl champion (XXXI); As an assistant coach: Super Bowl champion (LV); AP NFL Assistant Coach of the Year (2014); PFWA NFL Assistant Coach of the Year (2014)

Career NFL statistics
- Games played: 117
- Games started: 68
- Interceptions: 15
- Fumble recoveries: 7
- Stats at Pro Football Reference

Head coaching record
- Regular season: 62–78 (.443)
- Postseason: 1–3 (.250)
- Career: 63–81 (.438)
- Coaching profile at Pro Football Reference

Todd Robert Bowles (born November 18, 1963) is an American professional football coach and former player who is the head coach of the Tampa Bay Buccaneers of the National Football League (NFL). He played college football at Temple and signed with the Washington Redskins as an undrafted free agent in 1986 and was a member of the team that won Super Bowl XXII. Bowles was also a member of the San Francisco 49ers.

Bowles has since served as the head coach of the New York Jets and Buccaneers, the defensive coordinator for the Arizona Cardinals and Buccaneers, and the secondary coach for the Jets, Cleveland Browns, Dallas Cowboys, Miami Dolphins, and Philadelphia Eagles.

== Early life ==
Bowles attended Elizabeth High School in Elizabeth, New Jersey. He played college football for the Temple Owls (class of 1985), where Bowles was a four-year starting cornerback. His freshman year in 1982 was under Hall of Fame coach Wayne Hardin, and his last three years were under coach Bruce Arians, for whom Bowles would be an assistant coach in the NFL decades later when Arians was the head coach of the Arizona Cardinals and then the Tampa Bay Buccaneers. Bowles recorded seven interceptions in his four college seasons. Bowles left Temple without graduating; in May 2023, he received a Bachelor of Science degree in youth and community development from Mount St. Mary's University.

== Professional career ==
Bowles was signed by the Washington Redskins as an undrafted free agent on May 7, 1986. He chose the Redskins over six other NFL teams, and signed a contract that included a signing bonus between $8,000 and $10,000. Bowles competed in training camp with free safety Raphel Cherry, who beat Bowles out to earn a spot on the regular season roster. In his second training camp in 1987, Bowles beat out Curtis Jordan for the starting free safety job when Jordan was released during final roster cuts on September 8, 1987. Bowles intercepted a career high four passes and recovered a fumble during the season and was the starting free safety in Super Bowl XXII, which the Redskins won 42–10 over the Denver Broncos.

On February 1, 1989, after his contract expired, Bowles was left unprotected by the Redskins during "Plan B" free agency, despite being a regular starter at free safety the previous two seasons. This was reportedly due to his poor catching abilities in 1988, as well as his lack of playmaking ability. Bowles negotiated contracts with the Dallas Cowboys, Minnesota Vikings, and New York Giants, but ultimately re-signed with the Redskins. In 1990, Bowles received a salary of $300,000, and started 18 games (including playoffs).

The San Francisco 49ers signed Bowles to start for the team in 1991 after he was left unprotected by the Redskins again. Bowles played in all 16 games and started in 14 of them. He was waived during final roster cuts on September 1, 1992. The next day, Bowles was claimed off waivers by the Redskins. He was waived by the Redskins during final roster cuts on August 31, 1993.

== Executive career ==
After retiring as a player, Bowles was a member of the Green Bay Packers' player personnel staff under Ron Wolf in 1995 and 1996.

== Coaching career ==
=== Early career ===
Bowles was the defensive coordinator and secondary coach at Morehouse College in 1997, and the defensive coordinator and defensive backs coach at Grambling State from 1998 until 1999. He served as the defensive backs coach for the New York Jets in 2000, Cleveland Browns in 2004, and Dallas Cowboys from 2005 to 2007. Bowles was also the Browns' defensive nickel package coach from 2001 to 2003.

=== Miami Dolphins ===
Bowles was hired by the Miami Dolphins as the team's secondary coach and assistant head coach on January 23, 2008. After nearly four seasons as the secondary coach and assistant head coach, he was named the interim head coach on December 12, 2011, following the firing of head coach Tony Sparano. Bowles' first game as interim head coach of the Dolphins came in Week 15 against the Buffalo Bills, which the Dolphins won on the road 30–23. The Dolphins finished with a 2–1 record under Bowles in 2011.

=== Philadelphia Eagles ===
The Philadelphia Eagles hired Bowles as the team's secondary coach on January 30, 2012. On October 16, the Eagles announced that they dismissed defensive coordinator Juan Castillo from his duties and named Bowles as their new defensive coordinator. Under Bowles, the Eagles finished the season ninth in pass defense and 23rd in rushing defense.

=== Arizona Cardinals ===
On January 18, 2013, Bowles was hired as defensive coordinator for the Arizona Cardinals.

Bowles was voted Associated Press (AP)'s Assistant Coach of the Year for his efforts in the 2014 season. Bowles received 22 of the 50 media members' votes, winning the inaugural award.

=== New York Jets ===
On January 14, 2015, the New York Jets named Bowles their new head coach and signed him to a four-year deal.

On July 28, 2015, it was revealed that Bowles underwent a partial knee replacement surgery. In the 2015 season, the Jets went 10–6 in Bowles' first year leading the team, barely missing the playoffs. The 2016 season saw the Jets finish near the bottom of the league in most offensive categories, but 11th in rushing yards.

On December 29, 2017, the Jets announced that Bowles had been retained for the 2018 season and that he signed an extension through 2020. However, Bowles was fired at the end of the 2018 season after the Jets finished the year with a 4–12 record.

=== Tampa Bay Buccaneers ===
On January 8, 2019, Bowles was hired as the defensive coordinator of the Tampa Bay Buccaneers, rejoining Bruce Arians as a member of his staff after Arians was hired as the team's head coach.

Bowles' defense received praise for its performance in the 2020–21 playoffs as it was key in the Buccaneers defeating the New Orleans Saints 30–20 on the road in the Divisional Round and the Green Bay Packers 31–26 on the road in the NFC Championship Game. Bowles won his third Super Bowl (his first as a coach) when the Buccaneers defeated the Kansas City Chiefs 31–9 during Super Bowl LV. Bowles was credited with a game plan that pressured Chiefs quarterback Patrick Mahomes without resorting to blitzing by utilizing the two-deep safety look and pass-rushing, which prevented the Chiefs' prolific offense from scoring a touchdown while also intercepting Mahomes twice.

On August 4, 2021, Bowles agreed to a three-year contract extension with the Buccaneers.

On March 30, 2022, Bowles was named the head coach of the Buccaneers on a five-year deal after Bruce Arians shifted to a senior football consultant role. Arians had always planned on having Bowles succeed him as head coach when he eventually retired, and stated that starting quarterback Tom Brady announcing his return for the 2022 season played a role in accelerating his decision as it ensured that Bowles would have the benefit of a great quarterback on the roster and that continuity would exist amongst the coaching staff. In Bowles' first year as head coach, the Buccaneers finished atop the NFC South with an 8–9 record. However, they lost to the Dallas Cowboys 31–14 in the Wild Card Round.

Following the 2022 season, Brady announced his retirement and the Buccaneers signed Baker Mayfield in free agency as a result. The team finished the 2023 season atop the NFC South for the third consecutive year with a 9–8 record. They defeated the Philadelphia Eagles 32–9 in the Wild Card Round but lost to the Detroit Lions 31–23 on the road in the Divisional Round.

The Buccaneers finished the 2024 season atop the NFC South for the fourth consecutive year with a 10–7 record. However, they lost to the Washington Commanders 23–20 in the Wild Card Round.

Since being elevated to head coach in 2022, Bowles has earned widespread respect for his ability to keep the Buccaneers competitive through major roster transitions. He guided Tampa Bay to three consecutive NFC South titles from 2022–2024, becoming the first head coach in franchise history to win the division in each of his first three seasons. Praised for his steady leadership and defensive expertise, Bowles has overseen the continued development of a young nucleus that includes Calijah Kancey, Yaya Diaby, Zyon McCollum, and Antoine Winfield Jr., while also maximizing the veteran leadership of team captain Lavonte David. His defenses have consistently ranked among the league’s toughest against the run, and his ability to adapt game plans has been credited with keeping Tampa Bay in contention even as the roster evolved following Tom Brady’s retirement. Bowles’ partnership with Jason Licht has been central to sustaining the franchise’s identity as a postseason fixture.

On June 26, 2025, Bowles signed a multi-year contract extension with the Buccaneers.

== Head coaching record ==
Team	Year	Regular season					Postseason			
Team	Year	Won	Lost	Ties	Win %	Finish	Won	Lost	Win %	Result
MIA*	2011	2	1	0	.667	3rd in AFC East	—	—	—	—
MIA total		2	1	0	.667					
NYJ	2015	10	6	0	.625	2nd in AFC East	—	—	—	—
NYJ	2016	5	11	0	.313	4th in AFC East	—	—	—	—
NYJ	2017	5	11	0	.313	4th in AFC East	—	—	—	—
NYJ	2018	4	12	0	.250	4th in AFC East	—	—	—	—
NYJ total		24	40	0	.375					
TB	2022	8	9	0	.471	1st in NFC South	0	1	.000	Lost to Dallas Cowboys in NFC Wild Card Game
TB	2023	9	8	0	.529	1st in NFC South	1	1	.500	Lost to Detroit Lions in NFC Divisional Game
TB	2024	10	7	0	.588	1st in NFC South	0	1	.000	Lost to Washington Commanders in NFC Wild Card Game
TB	2025	8	9	0	.471	2nd in NFC South	—	—	—	—
TB	2026	3	6	0	.333		—	—	—	—
TB total		38	39	0	.494		1	3	.250	
Total		64	80	0	.444		1	3	.250	

* – Interim head coach

== Coaching tree ==
Bowles has served under nine head coaches:

- Doug Williams, Morehouse (1997); Grambling State (1998–1999)
- Al Groh, New York Jets (2000)
- Butch Davis, Cleveland Browns (2001–2004)
- Terry Robiskie, Cleveland Browns (2004, interim)
- Bill Parcells, Dallas Cowboys (2005–2006)
- Wade Phillips, Dallas Cowboys (2007)
- Tony Sparano, Miami Dolphins (2008–2011)
- Andy Reid, Philadelphia Eagles (2012)
- Bruce Arians, Arizona Cardinals (2013–2014); Tampa Bay Buccaneers (2019–2021)

Five of Bowles' assistants have been hired as head coaches in the NFL or NCAA:

- Karl Dorrell, Colorado (2020–2022)
- Dan Campbell, Detroit Lions (2021–present)
- Brian Daboll, New York Giants (2022–2025)
- Dave Canales, Carolina Panthers (2024–present)
- Liam Coen, Jacksonville Jaguars (2025–present)

== Personal life ==
Bowles and his wife, Taneka, have three sons: Todd Jr., Troy, and Tyson. In February 2026, Bowles hired Todd Jr. onto his coaching staff as a defensive assistant for the Tampa Bay Buccaneers.
