= 2017 New York Jets season =

2017 season of NFL team New York Jets

- Owner: Woody & Christopher Johnson
- General manager: Mike Maccagnan
- Head coach: Todd Bowles
- Home stadium: MetLife Stadium

Results
- Record: 5–11
- Division place: 4th AFC East
- Playoffs: Did not qualify
- Pro Bowlers: None

Uniform
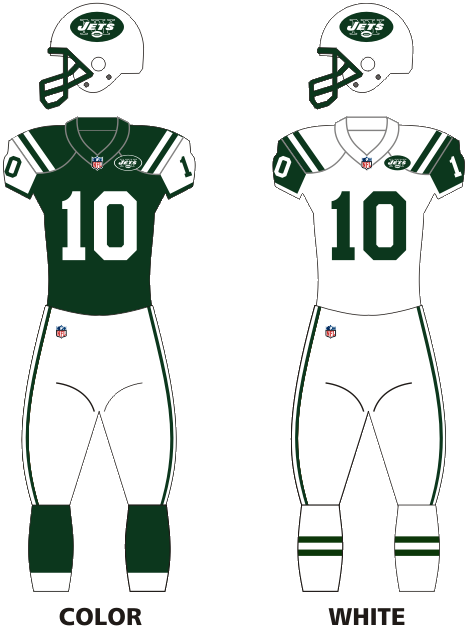

The 2017 season was the New York Jets' 48th in the National Football League (NFL), the 58th overall and the third under head coach Todd Bowles.

After losing their first two games, the first such start to a season since 2007, the Jets had an impressive three-game winning streak to improve to 3–2. However, the Jets collapsed and ended up winning only two games after Week 5. They equaled their record from the previous season, missed the playoffs for a seventh consecutive season, and were the solitary AFC team to not have one player make the Pro Bowl. It was the first time the Jets had won seven or fewer games in consecutive seasons since their 4–28 two-season streak of 1995 and 1996.

== Transactions ==
=== Coaching staff and front office personnel changes ===
Position	Coach	Reason	2017 Replacement	Date	Notes
Offensive coordinator	Chan Gailey	Retired	John Morton	January 29	
Quarterbacks coach	Kevin Pattulo	Fired	Jeremy Bates	February 8	
Running backs coach	Marcel Shipp	Fired	Stump Mitchell	February 1	
Defensive line coach	Pepper Johnson	Fired	Robert Nunn	January 22	
Outside linebackers coach	Mark Collins	Fired	Kevin Greene	January 27	
Defensive backs coach	Joe Danna	Fired	Dennard Wilson	January 11	
Assistant defensive line	John Scott, Jr.	Left	La'Roi Glover	February 28	
Assistant quarterback coach	position created		Mick Lombardi	February 8	
Assistant offensive coach	position created		Jason Vrable	February 8	
Senior director of college scouting	Rex Hogan	Left	Vacant		

==== Arrivals ====
- The Jets signed defensive ends Kenny Anunike and Claude Pelon, receiver Darius Jennings, fullback Chris Swain and tight end Jason Vander Laan to reserve/future contracts on January 2, 2017.
- The Jets signed kicker Ross Martin to a reserve/future contract on January 4, 2017.
- The Jets signed long snapper Zach Triner to a reserve/future contract on January 5, 2017.
- The Jets signed fullback Julian Howsare and receivers Myles White and Deshon Foxx to reserve/future contracts on January 11, 2017.
- The Jets signed outside linebacker Frank Beltre to a reserve/future contract on January 14, 2017.
- The Jets signed inside linebacker Jeff Luc to a reserve/future contract on January 18, 2017.
- The Jets signed receiver Frankie Hammond to a reserve/future contract on January 23, 2017.
- The Jets signed long snapper Josh Latham and claimed defensive tackle Mike Pennel off waivers on February 7, 2017.
- The Jets signed offensive tackle Jeff Adams on February 8, 2017.
- The Jets signed offensive tackle Kelvin Beachum and kicker Chandler Catanzaro on March 10, 2017.
- The Jets signed cornerback Morris Claiborne on March 18, 2017.
- The Jets signed quarterback Josh McCown on March 20, 2017.
- The Jets signed wide receiver Quinton Patton on March 23, 2017.
- The Jets signed center Jonotthan Harrison on March 28, 2017.
- The Jets signed tight end Brian Parker on April 6, 2017.
- The Jets signed cornerback John Ojo on April 7, 2017.
- The Jets signed linebacker Julian Stanford on April 17, 2017.
- The Jets claimed guard Alex Balducci off waivers on May 3, 2017.
- The Jets signed undrafted free agent linebackers Austin Calitro and Connor Harris, wide receivers Brisly Estime and Gabe Marks, cornerback Xavier Coleman, tight end Anthony Firkser, defensive end Patrick Gamble and offensive lineman Javarius Leamon.
- The Jets signed offensive linemen Ben Braden and Chris Bordelon on May 7, 2017.
- The Jets claimed K. D. Cannon off waivers on May 9, 2017.
- The Jets signed linebacker Jevaris Jones on May 15, 2017.
- The Jets signed wide receiver Deshon Foxx on May 22, 2017.
- The Jets signed cornerback Corey White on May 25, 2017.
- The Jets signed wide receiver Chris Harper on May 30, 2017.
- The Jets signed safety Shamarko Thomas on June 1, 2017.
- The Jets signed wide receiver Devin Street on June 5, 2017.
- The Jets signed linebacker Spencer Paysinger on June 9, 2017.
- The Jets signed running back Jordan Todman on June 13, 2017.
- The Jets signed wide receiver Marquess Wilson on June 20, 2017.
- The Jets claimed wide receiver Lucky Whitehead off waivers on July 26, 2017.
- The Jets claimed running back Marcus Murphy off waivers on July 27, 2017.
- The Jets signed tight end Chris Gragg on July 28, 2017.
- The Jets signed defensive lineman Devon Still and Jeremy Faulk and wide receiver Bruce Ellington on August 4, 2017.
- The Jets signed fullback Algie Brown on August 5, 2017.
- The Jets claimed defensive back Robenson Therezie off waivers on August 13, 2017.
- The Jets signed wide receiver Daniel Williams on August 14, 2017.
- The Jets signed wide receiver Kenbrell Thompkins on August 16, 2017.
- The Jets signed tight end Brandon Barnes on August 23, 2017.
- The Jets claimed defensive end Kony Ealy off waivers on August 27, 2017.
- The Jets signed cornerback Armagedon Draughn on August 28, 2017.
- The Jets claimed wide receivers Kalif Raymond and Damore'ea Stringfellow, tight end Will Tye, and linebacker Edmond Robinson off waivers on September 3, 2017.
- The Jets signed linebacker Bruce Carter on September 4, 2017.

==== Departures ====
- Kicker Nick Folk and right tackle Breno Giacomini were released on February 23, 2017.
- Center Nick Mangold was released on February 25, 2017.
- Wide receiver Brandon Marshall was released on March 3, 2017.
- Cornerback Darrelle Revis and running back Khiry Robinson were released on March 9, 2017.
- Defensive end Kenny Anunike and Julien Obioha, linebacker Jeff Luc, running back Brandon Burks, wide receiver Darius Jennings and long snapper Josh Latham were waived on April 26, 2017.
- Safety Marcus Gilchrist was released and fullback Chris Swain and cornerback Nick Marshall were waived on May 4, 2017.
- Cornerback John Ojo was waived on May 6, 2017.
- Offensive tackle Donald Hawkins and long snapper Zach Triner were released on May 7, 2017.
- Wide receiver Deshon Foxx was waived on May 9, 2017.
- Linebacker Austin Calitro was released on May 15, 2017.
- Wide receiver Brisly Estime was waived on May 25, 2017.
- Tight end Braedon Bowman was waived on May 30, 2017.
- Linebacker Jervaris Jones was waived on June 1, 2017.
- Linebacker David Harris was released on June 6, 2017.
- Wide receiver Eric Decker was released on June 12, 2017.
- Wide receiver Devin Street was waived on July 26, 2017.
- Running back Brandon Wilds was waived on July 27, 2017.
- Wide receiver K. D. Cannon was waived on July 28, 2017.
- Defensive end Brandin Bryant was waived on August 4, 2017.
- Wide receiver Bruce Ellington was waived on August 5, 2017.
- Fullback Algie Brown was waived on August 13, 2017.
- Wide receiver Deshon Foxx was waived on August 14, 2017.
- Safety Doug Middleton was waived on August 16, 2017.
- Wide receiver Marquess Wilson was released on August 23, 2017.
- Defensive tackle Anthony Johnson was waived on August 27, 2017.
- Defensive tackle Devon Still was released on August 28, 2017.
- Offensive lineman Jeff Adams and Craig Watts, wide receivers Chris Harper and Myles White, tight end Brandon Barnes, defensive lineman Jeremy Faulk, linebacker Spencer Paysinger, defensive backs Armagedon Draughn and David Rivers and kicker Ross Martin were released on September 1, 2017.
- Running backs Anthony Firkser, Romar Morris and Jahad Thomas, wide receivers Frankie Hammond, Gabe Marks, Lucky Whitehead and Dan Williams, guard Alex Balducci, Chris Bordelon, Ben Braden and Javarius Leamon, defensive end Patrick Gamble, defensive tackle Deon Simon and Lawrence Thomas, linebackers Frank Beltre and Connor Harris, corners Xavier Coleman and Robenson Therezie were waived and wide receiver Kenbrell Thompkins, safety Shamarko Thomas, and long snapper Tanner Purdum were released on September 2, 2017.
- Running back Marcus Murphy, tight end Jason Vander Laan and linebacker Freddie Bishop were waived and linebacker Bruce Carter was released on September 3, 2017.

=== Practice squad ===
==== Arrivals ====
- The Jets signed linebacker Frank Beltre, guard Ben Braden, cornerback Xavier Coleman and defensive tackleDeon Simon to the practice squad on September 3, 2017.
- The Jets signed defensive end Patrick Gamble, linebacker Freddie Bishop, offensive tackle Geoff Gray, running back Marcus Murphy, wide receiver JoJo Natson and cornerback Terrell Sinkfield to the practice squad on September 4, 2017.

=== Trades ===
- The Jets traded safety Calvin Pryor to the Cleveland Browns for linebacker Demario Davis on June 1, 2017.
- The Jets traded cornerback Dexter McDougle to the Philadelphia Eagles for safety Terrence Brooks on August 27, 2017.
- The Jets traded safety Ronald Martin to the Indianapolis Colts for long snapper Thomas Hennessy on August 28, 2017.
- The Jets traded defensive end Sheldon Richardson and a 2018 seventh round pick to the Seattle Seahawks for a second and seventh round pick in 2018 and wide receiver Jermaine Kearse on September 1, 2017.

=== Free agency ===
Position	Player	Free agency tag	Date signed/released	2017 team*	Notes
S	Antonio Allen	UFA			
TE	Brandon Bostick	UFA			Originally an RFA but was not tendered by the team and became a UFA.
LB	Bruce Carter	UFA	May 4, 2017	New York Jets	Signed a one-year $855,000 contract.
DE	Mike Catapano	UFA	August 23, 2017	Houston Texans	
T	Ryan Clady	UFA	—	Retired	Announced retirement on August 1, 2017.
TE	Kellen Davis	UFA			
QB	Ryan Fitzpatrick	UFA	May 19, 2017	Tampa Bay Buccaneers	Signed a one-year $3 million contract.
LB	Erin Henderson	UFA			
T	Ben Ijalana	UFA	March 9, 2017	New York Jets	Signed a two-year $11 million contract.
C	Wesley Johnson	RFA	March 9, 2017	New York Jets	Tendered a one-year $2.746 million contract. Johnson signed his tender on April 13, 2017.
LB	Corey Lemonier	UFA	March 9, 2017	New York Jets	Signed a one-year $775,000 contract.
LB	Josh Martin	UFA	March 9, 2017	New York Jets	Signed a two-year $4.3 million contract.
DT	Mike Pennel	UFA	March 22, 2017	New York Jets	Originally an RFA but was not tendered by the team and became a UFA. He later signed a one-year contract with the team.
LS	Tanner Purdum	UFA	March 10, 2017	New York Jets	Signed a one-year $980,000 contract.
QB	Geno Smith	UFA	March 20, 2017	New York Giants	Signed a one-year $2 million contract.
CB	Marcus Williams	RFA	March 9, 2017	New York Jets	Tendered a one-year $2.746 million contract.
G	Brian Winters	UFA	January 16, 2017	New York Jets	Signed a four-year $29 million contract.

RFA: Restricted free agent, UFA: Unrestricted free agent, ERFA: Exclusive rights free agent, FT: Franchise tag. The * denotes that the "2017 team" is the team that signed a player first after departing the Jets. It does not take into account additional transactions that may occur through the season.

== Draft ==
2017 New York Jets Draft
Round	Selection	Overall	Player	Position	College	Notes	Date signed
1	6	6	Jamal Adams	S	LSU		July 20, 2017
2	7	39	Marcus Maye	S	Florida		May 23, 2017
3	6	70	Traded to Minnesota Vikings				
3	15	79	ArDarius Stewart	WR	Alabama	From Minnesota Vikings	May 25, 2017
3	43	107	Traded to the Tampa Bay Buccaneers (Compensatory selection)				
4	7	114	Traded to Washington Redskins during the 2016 NFL draft				
4	19	125	From Tampa Bay Buccaneers then traded to Los Angeles Rams				
4	35	141	Chad Hansen	WR	California	From Los Angeles Rams (Compensatory selection)	May 16, 2017
5	6	150	Jordan Leggett	TE	Clemson		May 18, 2017
5	16	160	From Minnesota Vikings then traded to Cleveland Browns for selections 181 (5th) and 188 (6th)				
5	38	181	Dylan Donahue	DE	West Georgia	From Cleveland Browns (Compensatory selection)	May 23, 2017
6	4	188	Elijah McGuire	RB	Louisiana–Lafayette	From Cleveland Browns through Houston Texans and Chicago Bears	May 5, 2017
6	7	191	Traded to the Dallas Cowboys for a 2018 5th Round selection				
6	13	197	Jeremy Clark	CB	Michigan	From Los Angeles Rams though Chicago Bears though Arizona Cardinals	May 10, 2017
6	20	204	Derrick Jones	CB	Ole Miss	From Tampa Bay Buccaneers	May 5, 2017
7	6	224	Traded to the Cleveland Browns for selections 181 (5th) and 188 (6th)				

Notes

- As the result of a negative differential of free agent signings and departures that the Jets experienced during the 2016 free agency period, the team received a third round compensatory selection in 2017 draft. The Jets traded their 2017 fourth round selection to Washington to trade up for Brandon Shell in the 2016 draft.

== Staff ==
2017 New York Jets staff
Front office: Owner – Woody Johnson; Chairman/CEO – Christopher Johnson; President – Neil Glat; General manager – Mike Maccagnan; Director of football administration – Jacqueline Davidson; Director of player personnel – Brian Heimerdinger; Director of college scouting – Matt Bazirgan; Head coaches: Head coach – Todd Bowles; Assistant head coach/inside linebackers – Mike Caldwell; Offensive coaches: Offensive coordinator – John Morton; Quarterbacks – Jeremy Bates; Assistant quarterbacks – Mick Lombardi; Running backs – Stump Mitchell; Wide receivers – Karl Dorrell; Tight ends – Jimmie Johnson; Offensive line – Steve Marshall; Offensive line assistant – David Diaz-Infante; Offensive assistant – Jason Vrable	Defensive coaches: Defensive coordinator – Kacy Rodgers; Defensive line – Robert Nunn; Assistant defensive line – La'Roi Glover; Outside linebackers – Kevin Greene; Defensive backs – Dennard Wilson; Assistant defensive backs – Daylon McCutcheon; Defensive quality control – Tim Atkins; Defensive assistant – Robby Brown; Special teams coaches: Special teams coordinator – Brant Boyer; Special teams assistant – Jeff Hammerschmidt; Strength and conditioning: Head strength and conditioning – Justus Galac; Assistant strength and conditioning – Aaron McLaurin; Assistant strength and conditioning – Joe Giacobbe

== Final roster ==
2017 New York Jets roster
Quarterbacks (QB): 5 Christian Hackenberg; 9 Bryce Petty; Running backs (RB): 25 Elijah McGuire; 29 Bilal Powell; 39 Jahad Thomas; 44 Lawrence Thomas FB; Wide receivers (WR): 11 Robby Anderson; 16 Chad Hansen; 10 Jermaine Kearse; 87 JoJo Natson; 18 ArDarius Stewart; 82 Lucky Whitehead; Tight ends (TE): 88 Austin Seferian-Jenkins; 85 Neal Sterling; 83 Eric Tomlinson	Offensive linemen (OL): 68 Kelvin Beachum T; 77 James Carpenter G; 70 Dakota Dozier G; 78 Jonotthan Harrison C; 71 Ben Ijalana T; 76 Wesley Johnson C; 79 Brent Qvale T; 72 Brandon Shell T; Defensive linemen (DL): 75 Xavier Cooper DE; 99 Steve McLendon NT; 98 Mike Pennel DE; 93 Deon Simon NT; 96 Muhammad Wilkerson DE; 92 Leonard Williams DE	Linebackers (LB): 47 David Bass OLB; 50 Freddie Bishop OLB; 54 Bruce Carter ILB; 56 Demario Davis ILB; 94 Kony Ealy OLB; 57 Obum Gwacham OLB; 48 Jordan Jenkins OLB; 58 Darron Lee ILB; 95 Josh Martin OLB; 51 Julian Stanford ILB; Defensive backs (DB): 33 Jamal Adams SS; 23 Terrence Brooks SS; 32 Juston Burris CB; 21 Morris Claiborne CB; 34 Jeremy Clark CB; 31 Derrick Jones CB; 26 Marcus Maye FS; 45 Rontez Miles FS; 27 Darryl Roberts CB; 36 Rashard Robinson CB; 41 Buster Skrine CB; Special teams (ST): 7 Chandler Catanzaro K; 4 Lac Edwards P; 42 Thomas Hennessy LS	Practice squad: 69 Ben Braden G; 63 Francis Kallon DE; 65 Korren Kirven T; 30 Jeremy Langford RB; 89 Jalin Marshall WR; 1 Tre McBride WR (IR); 91 Claude Pelon DE (IR); 35 Terrell Sinkfield CB; 2 Joel Stave QB; 84 Damore'ea Stringfellow WR; 14 Dan Williams WR; Reserve: 38 Xavier Coleman CB (IR); 49 Dylan Donahue OLB (IR); 81 Quincy Enunwa WR (IR); 3 Brisly Estime WR (IR); 22 Matt Forte RB (IR); 87 Chris Gragg TE (IR); 37 Akeem Judd RB (IR); 37 Bryson Keeton CB (IR); 86 Jordan Leggett TE (IR); 55 Lorenzo Mauldin OLB (IR); 15 Josh McCown QB (IR); 36 Doug Middleton SS (IR); 17 Charone Peake WR (IR); 19 Devin Smith WR (IR); 97 Ed Stinson DE (IR); 67 Brian Winters G (IR); Rookies in italics 53 active, 18 reserve, 9 practice squad

== Preseason ==
Week	Date	Opponent	Result	Record	Venue	Recap
1	August 12	Tennessee Titans	W 7–3	1–0	MetLife Stadium	Recap
2	August 19	at Detroit Lions	L 6–16	1–1	Ford Field	Recap
3	August 26	at New York Giants	L 31–32	1–2	MetLife Stadium	Recap
4	August 31	Philadelphia Eagles	W 16–10	2–2	MetLife Stadium	Recap

== Regular season ==
=== Schedule ===
Week	Date	Opponent	Result	Record	Venue	Recap
1	September 10	at **Buffalo Bills**	**L** 12–21	0–1	New Era Field	Recap
2	September 17	at Oakland Raiders	**L** 20–45	0–2	Oakland–Alameda County Coliseum	Recap
3	September 24	**Miami Dolphins**	**W** 20–6	1–2	MetLife Stadium	Recap
4	October 1	Jacksonville Jaguars	**W** 23–20 (OT)	2–2	MetLife Stadium	Recap
5	October 8	at Cleveland Browns	**W** 17–14	3–2	FirstEnergy Stadium	Recap
6	October 15	**New England Patriots**	**L** 17–24	3–3	MetLife Stadium	Recap
7	October 22	at **Miami Dolphins**	**L** 28–31	3–4	Hard Rock Stadium	Recap
8	October 29	Atlanta Falcons	**L** 20–25	3–5	MetLife Stadium	Recap
9	November 2	**Buffalo Bills**	**W** 34–21	4–5	MetLife Stadium	Recap
10	November 12	at Tampa Bay Buccaneers	**L** 10–15	4–6	Raymond James Stadium	Recap
11	Bye					
12	November 26	Carolina Panthers	**L** 27–35	4–7	MetLife Stadium	Recap
13	December 3	Kansas City Chiefs	**W** 38–31	5–7	MetLife Stadium	Recap
14	December 10	at Denver Broncos	**L** 0–23	5–8	Sports Authority Field at Mile High	Recap
15	December 17	at New Orleans Saints	**L** 19–31	5–9	Mercedes-Benz Superdome	Recap
16	December 24	Los Angeles Chargers	**L** 7–14	5–10	MetLife Stadium	Recap
17	December 31	at **New England Patriots**	**L** 6–26	5–11	Gillette Stadium	Recap

Note: Intra-division opponents are in bold text.

=== Game summaries ===
==== Week 1: at Buffalo Bills ====
Week One: New York Jets at Buffalo Bills – Game summary

Quarter	1	2	3	4	Total
Jets	0	6	6	0	**12**
**Bills**	0	7	7	7	**21**

at New Era Field, Orchard Park, New York

- Date: September 10
- Game time: 1:00 p.m. EDT
- Game weather: 65 °F (18 °C), sun and clouds
- Game attendance: 68,751
- Referee: John Hussey
- TV announcers (CBS): Kevin Harlan and Rich Gannon
- Recap, Gamebook

Game information

**First quarter**

- No scoring plays

**Second quarter**

- BUF – Charles Clay 1-yard pass from Tyrod Taylor (Steven Hauschka kick), 11:30. Bills 7–0. **Drive: 12 plays, 77 yards, 5:31.**
- NYJ – Chandler Catanzaro 48-yard field goal, 6:39. Bills 7–3. **Drive: 9 plays, 45 yards, 4:52.**
- NYJ – Chandler Catanzaro 52-yard field goal, 1:49. Bills 7–6. **Drive: 8 plays, 30 yards, 2:15.**

**Third quarter**

- BUF – Andre Holmes 1-yard pass from Tyrod Taylor (Steven Hauschka kick), 11:30. Bills 14–6. **Drive: 6 plays, 64 yards, 2:13.**
- NYJ – Josh McCown 1-yard run (pass failed), 2:06. Bills 14–12. **Drive: 11 plays, 75 yards, 4:52.**

**Fourth quarter**

- BUF – Mike Tolbert 1-yard run (Steven Hauschka kick), 12:51. Bills 21–12. **Drive: 9 plays, 80 yards, 4:13.**

**Top passers**

- NYJ – Josh McCown – 26/39, 187 yards, 2 INT
- BUF – Tyrod Taylor – 16/28, 224 yards, 2 TD, INT

**Top rushers**

- NYJ – Bilal Powell – 7 rushes, 22 yards
- BUF – LeSean McCoy – 22 rushes, 110 yards

**Top receivers**

- NYJ – Jermaine Kearse – 7 receptions, 59 yards
- BUF – Jordan Matthews – 2 receptions, 61 yards

With their first loss to the Bills since 2015 the Jets dropped to 0–1.

==== Week 2: at Oakland Raiders ====
Week Two: New York Jets at Oakland Raiders – Game summary

Quarter	1	2	3	4	Total
Jets	0	10	3	7	**20**
**Raiders**	7	14	7	17	**45**

at Oakland–Alameda County Coliseum, Oakland, California

- Date: September 17
- Game time: 4:05 p.m. EDT/1:05 p.m. PDT
- Game weather: 70 °F (21 °C), sunny
- Game attendance: 54,729
- Referee: Jeff Triplette
- TV announcers (CBS): Ian Eagle, Dan Fouts and Evan Washburn
- Recap, Gamebook

Game information

**First quarter**

- OAK – Michael Crabtree 2-yard pass from Derek Carr (Giorgio Tavecchio kick), 4:58. Raiders 7–0. **Drive: 11 plays, 81 yards, 5:59.**

**Second quarter**

- OAK – Michael Crabtree 26-yard pass from Derek Carr (Giorgio Tavecchio kick), 13:00. Raiders 14–0. **Drive: 8 plays, 85 yards, 4:38.**
- NYJ – Jermaine Kearse 34-yard pass from Josh McCown (Chandler Catanzaro kick), 9:15. Raiders 14–7. **Drive: 7 plays, 75 yards, 3:47.**
- NYJ – Chandler Catanzaro 46-yard field goal, 3:11. Raiders 14–10. **Drive: 11 plays, 62 yards, 4:40.**
- OAK – Marshawn Lynch 2-yard run (Giorgio Tavecchio kick), 0:23. Raiders 21–10. **Drive: 3 plays, 4 yards, 1:29.**

**Third quarter**

- NYJ – Chandler Catanzaro 40-yard field goal, 7:14. Raiders 21–13. **Drive: 12 plays, 45 yards, 7:50.**
- OAK – Cordarrelle Patterson 43-yard run (Giorgio Tavecchio kick), 3:39. Raiders 28–13. **Drive: 7 plays, 84 yards, 3:39.**

**Fourth quarter**

- OAK – Jalen Richard 52-yard run (Giorgio Tavecchio kick), 12:59. Raiders 35–13. **Drive: 4 plays, 79 yards, 2:00.**
- OAK – Michael Crabtree 1-yard pass from Derek Carr (Giorgio Tavecchio kick), 12:32. Raiders 42–13. **Drive: 1 play, 18 yards, 0:10.**
- NYJ – Jermaine Kearse 11-yard pass from Josh McCown (Chandler Catanzaro kick), 8:47. Raiders 42–20. **Drive: 10 plays, 75 yards, 3:45.**
- OAK – Giorgio Tavecchio 29-yard field goal, 0:29. Raiders 45–20. **Drive: 12 plays, 37 yards, 8:17.**

**Top passers**

- NYJ – Josh McCown – 17/25, 166 yards, 2 TD
- OAK – Derek Carr – 23/28, 230 yards, 3 TD

**Top rushers**

- NYJ – Matt Forte – 9 rushes, 53 yards
- OAK – Jalen Richard – 6 rushes, 58 yards, TD

**Top receivers**

- NYJ – Jermaine Kearse – 4 receptions, 64 yards, 2 TD
- OAK – Michael Crabtree – 6 receptions, 80 yards, 3 TD

The Jets were embrassed by the Raiders 45-20 and they dropped to 0–2 as a result.

==== Week 3: vs. Miami Dolphins ====
Week Three: Miami Dolphins at New York Jets – Game summary

Quarter	1	2	3	4	Total
Dolphins	0	0	0	6	**6**
**Jets**	0	10	10	0	**20**

at MetLife Stadium, East Rutherford, New Jersey

- Date: September 24
- Game time: 1:00 p.m. EDT
- Game weather: 88 °F (31 °C), sunny
- Game attendance: 77,562
- Referee: Terry McAulay
- TV announcers (CBS): Tom McCarthy, Steve Tasker and Steve Beuerlein
- Recap, Gamebook

Game information

**First quarter**

- No scoring plays.

**Second quarter**

- NYJ – Chandler Catanzaro 40-yard field goal, 7:21. Jets 3–0. **Drive: 9 plays, 41 yards, 5:42.**
- NYJ – Robby Anderson 69-yard pass from Josh McCown (Chandler Catanzaro kick), 1:51. Jets 10–0. **Drive: 3 plays, 71 yards, 0:40.**

**Third quarter**

- NYJ – Bilal Powell 1-yard run (Chandler Catanzaro kick), 9:52. Jets 17–0. **Drive: 7 plays, 49 yards, 4:06.**
- NYJ – Chandler Catanzaro 22-yard field goal, 1:38. Jets 20–0. **Drive: 13 plays, 45 yards, 6:58.**

**Fourth quarter**

- MIA – DeVante Parker 3-yard pass from Jay Cutler (kick failed), 0:06. Jets 20–6. **Drive: 8 plays, 80 yards, 2:15.**

**Top passers**

- MIA – Jay Cutler – 26/44, 220 yards, TD, INT
- NYJ – Josh McCown – 18/23, 249 yards, TD

**Top rushers**

- MIA – Jay Ajayi – 11 rushes, 16 yards
- NYJ – Bilal Powell – 15 rushes, 37 yards, TD

**Top receivers**

- MIA – DeVante Parker – 8 receptions, 76 yards, TD
- NYJ – Robby Anderson – 3 receptions, 95 yards, TD

==== Week 4: vs. Jacksonville Jaguars ====
Week Four: Jacksonville Jaguars at New York Jets – Game summary

Quarter	1	2	3	4	OT	Total
Jaguars	7	3	0	10	0	**20**
**Jets**	7	3	10	0	3	**23**

at MetLife Stadium, East Rutherford, New Jersey

- Date: October 1
- Game time: 1:00 p.m. EDT
- Game weather: 64 °F (18 °C), sunny
- Game attendance: 77,562
- Referee: Gene Steratore
- TV announcers (CBS): Andrew Catalon and James Lofton
- Recap, Gamebook

Game information

**First quarter**

- JAX – Leonard Fournette 10-yard pass from Blake Bortles (Jason Myers kick), 8:08. Jaguars 7–0. **Drive: 10 plays, 61 yards, 5:15.**
- NYJ – Bilal Powell 75-yard run (Chandler Catanzaro kick), 8:02. Tied 7–7. **Drive: 1 play, 75 yards, 0:13.**

**Second quarter**

- JAX – Jason Myers 30-yard field goal, 5:13. Jaguars 10–7. **Drive: 13 plays, 75 yards, 7:15.**
- NYJ – Chandler Catanzaro 45-yard field goal, 1:14. Tied 10–10. **Drive: 9 plays, 42 yards, 3:59.**

**Third quarter**

- NYJ – Elijah McGuire 69-yard run (Chandler Catanzaro kick), 10:09. Jets 17–10. **Drive: 2 plays, 82 yards, 0:07.**
- NYJ – Chandler Catanzaro 26-yard field goal, 0:38. Jets 20–10. **Drive: 4 plays, -1 yard, 1:31.**

**Fourth quarter**

- JAX – Myles Jack 82-yard fumble return (Jason Myers kick), 10:33 Jets 20–17.
- JAX – Jason Myers 22-yard field goal, 0:49. Tied 20–20. **Drive: 8 plays, 31 yards, 2:33.**

**Overtime**

- NYJ – Chandler Catanzaro 41-yard field goal, 0:32. Jets 23–20. **Drive: 4 plays, 2 yards, 1:10.**

**Top passers**

- JAX – Blake Bortles – 15/35, 140 yards, TD, INT
- NYJ – Josh McCown – 22/31, 224 yards, INT

**Top rushers**

- JAX – Leonard Fournette – 24 rushes, 86 yards
- NYJ – Bilal Powell – 21 rushes, 163 yards, TD

**Top receivers**

- JAX – Leonard Fournette – 4 receptions, 59 yards, TD
- NYJ – Robby Anderson – 3 receptions, 59 yards

==== Week 5: at Cleveland Browns ====
Week Five: New York Jets at Cleveland Browns – Game summary

Quarter	1	2	3	4	Total
**Jets**	0	3	7	7	**17**
Browns	0	0	7	7	**14**

at FirstEnergy Stadium, Cleveland, Ohio

- Date: October 8
- Game time: 1:00 p.m. EDT
- Game weather: 67 °F (19 °C), cloudy
- Game attendance: 62,032
- Referee: Walt Anderson
- TV announcers (Fox): Sam Rosen, Ronde Barber and Kristina Pink
- Recap, Gamebook

Game information

**First quarter**

- No scoring plays.

**Second quarter**

- NYJ – Chandler Catanzaro 57-yard field goal, 0:01. Jets 3–0. **Drive: 6 plays, 32 yards, 0:31.**

**Third quarter**

- CLE – David Njoku 21-yard pass from Kevin Hogan (Zane Gonzalez kick), 9:29. Browns 7–3. **Drive: 10 plays, 75 yards, 5:37.**
- NYJ – Austin Seferian-Jenkins 2-yard pass from Josh McCown (Chandler Catanzaro kick), 4:21. Jets 10–7. **Drive: 2 plays, 13 yards, 0:41.**

**Fourth quarter**

- NYJ – Jermaine Kearse 24-yard pass from Josh McCown (Chandler Catanzaro kick), 8:35. Jets 17–7. **Drive: 8 plays, 97 yards, 4:26.**
- CLE – Duke Johnson 41-yard pass from Kevin Hogan (Zane Gonzalez kick), 2:00. Jets 17–14. **Drive: 5 plays, 86 yards, 1:34.**

**Top passers**

- NYJ – Josh McCown – 23/30, 194 yards, 2 TD, INT
- CLE – Kevin Hogan – 16/19, 194 yards, 2 TD, INT

**Top rushers**

- NYJ – Elijah McGuire – 11 rushes, 20 yards
- CLE – Isaiah Crowell – 16 rushes, 60 yards

**Top receivers**

- NYJ – Jeremy Kerley – 4 receptions, 39 yards
- CLE – Ricardo Louis – 5 receptions, 71 yards

==== Week 6: vs. New England Patriots ====
Week Six: New England Patriots at New York Jets – Game summary

Quarter	1	2	3	4	Total
**Patriots**	0	14	7	3	**24**
Jets	7	7	0	3	**17**

at MetLife Stadium, East Rutherford, New Jersey

- Date: October 15
- Game time: 1:00 p.m. EDT
- Game weather: 73 °F (23 °C), cloudy
- Game attendance: 77,562
- Referee: Tony Corrente
- TV announcers (CBS): Ian Eagle, Dan Fouts and Evan Washburn
- Recap, Gamebook

Game information

**First quarter**

- NYJ – Austin Seferian-Jenkins 1-yard pass from Josh McCown (Chandler Catanzaro kick), 9:08. Jets 7–0. **Drive: 13 plays, 88 yards, 5:52.**

**Second quarter**

- NYJ – Jeremy Kerley 31-yard pass from Josh McCown (Chandler Catanzaro kick), 12:18. Jets 14–0. **Drive: 7 plays, 78 yards, 3:33.**
- NE – Dion Lewis 1-yard run (Stephen Gostkowski kick), 5:19. Jets 14–7. **Drive: 9 plays, 93 yards, 4:24.**
- NE – Rob Gronkowski 2-yard pass from Tom Brady (Stephen Gostkowski kick), 0:09. Tied 14–14. **Drive: 6 plays, 63 yards, 0:26.**

**Third quarter**

- NE – Rob Gronkowski 33-yard pass from Tom Brady (Stephen Gostkowski kick), 11:22. Patriots 21–14. **Drive: 8 plays, 75 yards, 3:38.**

**Fourth quarter**

- NE – Stephen Gostkowski 28-yard field goal, 14:10. Patriots 24–14. **Drive: 11 plays, 63 yards, 5:31.**
- NYJ – Chandler Catanzaro 28-yard field goal, 3:40. Patriots 24–17. **Drive: 6 plays, 55 yards, 2:52.**

**Top passers**

- NE – Tom Brady – 20/38, 257 yards, 2 TD, INT
- NYJ – Josh McCown – 31/47, 354 yards, 2 TD, 2 INT

**Top rushers**

- NE – Dion Lewis – 11 rushes, 52 yards, TD
- NYJ – Matt Forte – 9 rushes, 22 yards

**Top receivers**

- NE – Brandin Cooks – 6 receptions, 93 yards
- NYJ – Jermaine Kearse – 4 receptions, 79 yards

With the heartbreaking loss the Jets's 3 game win streak was snapped and they lost their 3rd straight game against New England while dropping to 3-3.

==== Week 7: at Miami Dolphins ====
Week Seven: New York Jets at Miami Dolphins – Game summary

Quarter	1	2	3	4	Total
Jets	14	7	7	0	**28**
**Dolphins**	7	7	0	17	**31**

at Hard Rock Stadium, Miami Gardens, Florida

- Date: October 22
- Game time: 1:00 p.m. EDT
- Game weather: 86 °F (30 °C), partly cloudy
- Game attendance: 65,025
- Referee: Walt Coleman
- TV announcers (Fox): Dan Hellie, Chris Spielman and Peter Schrager
- Recap, Gamebook

Game information

**First quarter**

- NYJ – Jermaine Kearse 29-yard pass from Josh McCown (Chandler Catanzaro kick), 12:55. Jets 7–0. **Drive: 5 plays, 75 yards, 2:05.**
- MIA – Jarvis Landry 4-yard pass from Jay Cutler (Cody Parkey kick), 10:44. Tied 7–7. **Drive: 5 plays, 75 yards, 2:11.**
- NYJ – Robby Anderson 18-yard pass from Josh McCown (Chandler Catanzaro kick), 1:27. Jets 14–7. **Drive: 8 plays, 75 yards, 4:54.**

**Second quarter**

- MIA – Anthony Fasano 4-yard pass from Jay Cutler (Cody Parkey kick), 6:14. Tied 14–14. **Drive: 10 plays, 70 yards, 5:11.**
- NYJ – Josh McCown 1-yard run (Chandler Catanzaro kick), 1:51. Jets 21–14. **Drive: 2 plays, 1 yards, 0:41.**

**Third quarter**

- NYJ – Austin Seferian-Jenkins 10-yard pass from Josh McCown (Chandler Catanzaro kick), 1:41. Jets 28–14. **Drive: 7 plays, 45 yards, 4:04.**

**Fourth quarter**

- MIA – Kenny Stills 28-yard pass from Matt Moore (Cody Parkey kick), 11:21. Jets 28–21. **Drive: 4 plays, 42 yards, 1:27.**
- MIA – Kenny Stills 2-yard pass from Matt Moore (Cody Parkey kick), 6:19. Tied 28–28. **Drive: 6 plays, 54 yards, 3:25.**
- MIA – Cody Parkey 39-yard field goal, 0:22. Dolphins 31–28. **Drive: 4 plays, 6 yards, 0:17.**

**Top passers**

- NYJ – Josh McCown – 17/27, 209 yards, 3 TD, INT
- MIA – Matt Moore – 13/21, 188 yards, 2 TD, INT

**Top rushers**

- NYJ – Bilal Powell – 9 carries, 43 yards
- MIA – Jay Ajayi – 23 carries, 51 yards

**Top receivers**

- NYJ – Matt Forte – 5 receptions, 41 yards
- MIA – Jarvis Landry – 7 receptions, 93 yards, TD

==== Week 8: vs. Atlanta Falcons ====
Week Eight: Atlanta Falcons at New York Jets – Game summary

Quarter	1	2	3	4	Total
**Falcons**	7	6	3	9	**25**
Jets	7	10	0	3	**20**

at MetLife Stadium, East Rutherford, New Jersey

- Date: October 29
- Game time: 1:00 p.m. EDT
- Game weather: 63 °F (17 °C), rain
- Game attendance: 77,562
- Referee: Craig Wrolstad
- TV announcers (Fox): Sam Rosen, Ronde Barber and Kristina Pink
- Recap, Gamebook

Game information

**First quarter**

- NYJ – Eric Tomlinson 20-yard pass from Josh McCown (Chandler Catanzaro kick), 10:33. Jets 7–0. **Drive: 8 plays, 75 yards, 4:27.**
- ATL – Austin Hooper 1-yard pass from Matt Ryan (Matt Bryant kick), 5:03. Tied 7–7. **Drive: 7 plays, 64 yards, 3:13.**

**Second quarter**

- NYJ – Chandler Catanzaro 43-yard field goal, 14:03. Jets 10–7. **Drive: 4 plays, 15 yards, 1:10.**
- ATL – Matt Bryant 23-yard field goal, 8:06. Tied 10–10. **Drive: 12 plays, 70 yards, 5:57.**
- NYJ – Robby Anderson 24-yard pass from Josh McCown (Chandler Catanzaro kick), 2:26. Jets 17–10. **Drive: 5 plays, 43 yards, 2:37.**
- ATL – Matt Bryant 45-yard field goal, 0:00. Jets 17–13. **Drive: 10 plays, 53 yards, 2:26.**

**Third quarter**

- ATL – Matt Bryant 37-yard field goal, 5:12. Jets 17–16. **Drive: 5 plays, 61 yards, 2:04.**

**Fourth quarter**

- ATL – Mohamed Sanu 8-yard pass from Matt Ryan (run failed), 12:22. Falcons 22–17. **Drive: 4 plays, 62 yards, 1:55.**
- NYJ – Chandler Catanzaro 46-yard field goal, 8:42. Falcons 22–20. **Drive: 7 plays, 52 yards, 3:40.**
- ATL – Matt Bryant 29-yard field goal, 5:19. Falcons 25–20. **Drive: 4 plays, 2 yards, 1:23.**

**Top passers**

- ATL – Matt Ryan – 18/29, 254 yards, 2 TD
- NYJ – Josh McCown – 26/33, 257 yards, 2 TD

**Top rushers**

- ATL – Tevin Coleman – 14 carries, 82 yards
- NYJ – Bilal Powell – 14 carries, 33 yards

**Top receivers**

- ATL – Mohamed Sanu – 6 receptions, 74 yards, TD
- NYJ - Robby Anderson – 6 receptions, 104 yards, TD

==== Week 9: vs. Buffalo Bills ====
Week Nine: Buffalo Bills at New York Jets – Game summary

Quarter	1	2	3	4	Total
Bills	0	7	0	14	**21**
**Jets**	7	3	14	10	**34**

at MetLife Stadium, East Rutherford, New Jersey

- Date: November 2
- Game time: 8:25 p.m. EDT
- Game weather: 68 °F (20 °C), clear
- Game attendance: 77,562
- Referee: Jerome Boger
- TV announcers (NFLN): Jim Nantz, Tony Romo, Tracy Wolfson and Jay Feely
- Recap, Gamebook

Game information

**First quarter**

- NYJ – Josh McCown 10-yard run (Chandler Catanzaro kick), 7:43. Jets 7–0. **Drive: 8 plays, 54 yards, 3:46.**

**Second quarter**

- BUF – Zay Jones 10-yard pass from Tyrod Taylor (Stephen Hauschka kick), 14:52. Tied 7–7. **Drive: 8 plays, 62 yards, 3:16.**
- NYJ – Chandler Catanzaro 45-yard field goal, 10:26. Jets 10–7. **Drive: 9 plays, 52 yards, 4:26.**

**Third quarter**

- NYJ – Robby Anderson 25-yard pass from Josh McCown (Chandler Catanzaro kick), 9:50. Jets 17–7. **Drive: 7 plays, 74 yards, 3:49.**
- NYJ – Matt Forte 10-yard run (Chandler Catanzaro kick), 4:16. Jets 24–7. **Drive: 2 plays, 61 yards, 0:57.**

**Fourth quarter**

- NYJ – Matt Forte 5-yard run (Chandler Catanzaro kick), 11:21. Jets 31–7. **Drive: 1 play, 5 yards, 0:05.**
- NYJ – Chandler Catanzaro 32-yard field goal, 6:42. Jets 34–7. **Drive: 6 plays, 18 yards, 3:47.**
- BUF – Deonte Thompson 26-yard pass from Tyrod Taylor (Stephen Hauschka kick), 4:10. Jets 34–14. **Drive: 10 plays, 75 yards, 2:32.**
- BUF – Tyrod Taylor 1-yard run (Stephen Hauschka kick), 2:29. Jets 34–21. **Drive: 7 plays, 52 yards, 1:41.**

**Top passers**

- BUF – Tyrod Taylor – 29/40, 285 yards, 2 TD
- NYJ – Josh McCown – 14/20, 140 yards, TD

**Top rushers**

- BUF – Tyrod Taylor – 6 carries, 35 yards, TD
- NYJ – Matt Forte – 14 carries, 77 yards, 2 TD

**Top receivers**

- BUF – Deonte Thompson – 7 receptions, 81 yards, TD
- NYJ – Robby Anderson – 4 receptions, 48 yards, TD

With the win the Jets improved to 4-5 and had now won 3 of 4 against Buffalo since 2016.

==== Week 10: at Tampa Bay Buccaneers ====
Week Ten: New York Jets at Tampa Bay Buccaneers – Game summary

Quarter	1	2	3	4	Total
Jets	0	3	0	7	**10**
**Buccaneers**	3	0	6	6	**15**

at Raymond James Stadium, Tampa, Florida

- Date: November 12
- Game time: 1:00 p.m. EST
- Game weather: 79 °F (26 °C), cloudy
- Game attendance: 57,911
- Referee: Brad Allen
- TV announcers (CBS): Kevin Harlan and Rich Gannon
- Recap, Gamebook

Game information

**First quarter**

- TB – Patrick Murray 29-yard field goal, 0:54. Buccaneers 3–0. **Drive: 17 plays, 77 yards, 7:56.**

**Second quarter**

- NYJ – Chandler Catanzaro 47-yard field goal, 0:00. Tied 3–3. **Drive: 16 plays, 51 yards, 7:23.**

**Third quarter**

- TB – Patrick Murray 49-yard field goal, 10:42. Buccaneers 6–3. **Drive: 9 plays, 44 yards, 4:18.**
- TB – Patrick Murray 37-yard field goal, 0:29. Buccaneers 9–3. **Drive: 7 plays, 32 yards, 2:56.**

**Fourth quarter**

- TB – Charles Sims 6-yard pass from Ryan Fitzpatrick (run failed), 6:05. Buccaneers 15–3. **Drive: 15 plays, 81 yards, 7:25.**
- NYJ – Robby Anderson 38-yard pass from Josh McCown (Chandler Catanzaro kick), 0:28. Buccaneers 15–10. **Drive: 6 plays, 70 yards, 1:25.**

**Top passers**

- NYJ – Josh McCown – 23/39, 262 yards, TD, INT
- TB – Ryan Fitzpatrick – 17/34, 187 yards, TD, INT

**Top rushers**

- NYJ – Bilal Powell – 10 carries, 30 yards
- TB – Doug Martin – 20 carries, 51 yards

**Top receivers**

- NYJ – Austin Seferian-Jenkins – 6 receptions, 67 yards
- TB – DeSean Jackson – 6 receptions, 82 yards

With the loss, the Jets ended their eight-game winning streak against the Buccaneers.

==== Week 12: vs. Carolina Panthers ====
Week Twelve: Carolina Panthers at New York Jets – Game summary

Quarter	1	2	3	4	Total
**Panthers**	3	9	6	17	**35**
Jets	3	7	7	10	**27**

at MetLife Stadium, East Rutherford, New Jersey

- Date: November 26
- Game time: 1:00 p.m. EST
- Game weather: 47 °F (8 °C), sunny
- Game attendance: 77,562
- Referee: Carl Cheffers
- TV announcers (Fox): Thom Brennaman, Chris Spielman and Peter Schrager
- Recap, Gamebook

Game information

**First quarter**

- CAR – Graham Gano 40-yard field goal, 9:55. Panthers 3–0. **Drive: 12 plays, 48 yards, 5:05.**
- NYJ – Chandler Catanzaro 31-yard field goal, 5:13. Tied 3–3. **Drive: 10 plays, 55 yards, 4:42.**

**Second quarter**

- CAR – Cam Newton 1-yard run (kick failed), 10:02. Panthers 9–3. **Drive: 8 plays, 86 yards, 4:14.**
- CAR – Graham Gano 33-yard field goal, 3:59. Panthers 12–3. **Drive: 5 plays, 34 yards, 2:11.**
- NYJ – Robby Anderson 33-yard pass from Josh McCown (Chandler Catanzaro kick), 1:12. Panthers 12–10. **Drive: 6 plays, 65 yards, 1:00.**

**Third quarter**

- NYJ – Robby Anderson 54-yard pass from Josh McCown (Chandler Catanzaro kick), 5:41. Jets 17–12. **Drive: 2 plays, 68 yards, 0:37.**
- CAR – Jonathan Stewart 2-yard run (pass failed), 1:12. Panthers 18–17. **Drive: 9 plays, 75 yards, 4:29.**

**Fourth quarter**

- NYJ – Chandler Catanzaro 19-yard field goal, 14:01. Jets 20–18. **Drive: 10 plays, 74 yards, 2:11.**
- CAR – Luke Kuechly 34-yard fumble return (Cam Newton run), 12:05. Panthers 26–20.
- CAR – Kaelin Clay 60-yard punt return (pass failed), 9:54. Panthers 32–20.
- NYJ – Jermaine Kearse 3-yard pass from Josh McCown (Chandler Catanzaro kick), 5:32. Panthers 32–27. **Drive: 8 plays, 75 yards, 4:22.**
- CAR – Graham Gano 45-yard field goal, 0:21. Panthers 35–27. **Drive: 11 plays, 48 yards, 5:11.**

**Top passers**

- CAR – Cam Newton – 11/28, 168 yards
- NYJ – Josh McCown – 19/36, 307 yards, 3 TD

**Top rushers**

- CAR – Christian McCaffrey – 7 carries, 62 yards
- NYJ – Bilal Powell – 9 carries, 34 yards

**Top receivers**

- CAR – Devin Funchess – 7 receptions, 108 yards
- NYJ – Jermaine Kearse – 7 receptions, 105 yards, TD

==== Week 13: vs. Kansas City Chiefs ====
Week Thirteen: Kansas City Chiefs at New York Jets – Game summary

Quarter	1	2	3	4	Total
Chiefs	14	3	7	7	**31**
**Jets**	14	7	6	11	**38**

at MetLife Stadium, East Rutherford, New Jersey

- Date: December 3
- Game time: 1:00 p.m. EST
- Game weather: 48 °F (9 °C), cloudy
- Game attendance: 77,562
- Referee: John Parry
- TV announcers (CBS): Ian Eagle, Dan Fouts and Evan Washburn
- Recap, Gamebook

Game information

**First quarter**

- KC – Travis Kelce 22-yard pass from Alex Smith (Harrison Butker kick), 12:22. Chiefs 7–0. **Drive: 5 plays, 75 yards, 2:38.**
- KC – Travis Kelce 36-yard pass from Alex Smith (Harrison Butker kick), 10:36. Chiefs 14–0. **Drive: 1 plays, 36 yards, 0:06.**
- NYJ – Bilal Powell 1-yard run (Chandler Catanzaro kick), 6:10. Chiefs 14–7. **Drive: 9 plays, 75 yards, 4:26.**
- NYJ – Josh McCown 1-yard run (Chandler Catanzaro kick), 0:46. Tied 14–14. **Drive: 8 plays, 68 yards, 5:02.**

**Second quarter**

- KC – Harrison Butker 36-yard field goal, 2:49. Chiefs 17–14. **Drive: 6 plays, 68 yards, 2:45.**
- NYJ – Matt Forte 11-yard pass from Josh McCown (Chandler Catanzaro kick), 0:23. Jets 21–17. **Drive: 10 plays, 75 yards, 2:26.**

**Third quarter**

- NYJ – Chandler Catanzaro 27-yard field goal, 5:29. Jets 24–17. **Drive: 18 plays, 72 yards, 9:31.**
- KC – Tyreek Hill 79-yard pass from Alex Smith (Harrison Butker kick), 5:13. Tied 24–24. **Drive: 1 plays, 79 yards, 0:16.**
- NYJ – Chandler Catanzaro 47-yard field goal, 3:27. Jets 27–24. **Drive: 5 plays, 46 yards, 1:46.**

**Fourth quarter**

- NYJ – Chandler Catanzaro 38-yard field goal, 11:23. Jets 30–24. **Drive: 11 plays, 58 yards, 5:26.**
- KC – Tyreek Hill 40-yard pass from Alex Smith (Harrison Butker kick), 9:13. Chiefs 31–30. **Drive: 5 plays, 69 yards, 2:10.**
- NYJ – Josh McCown 1-yard run (Elijah McGuire run), 2:15. Jets 38–31. **Drive: 14 plays, 75 yards, 6:58.**

**Top passers**

- KC – Alex Smith – 19/33, 366 yards, 4 TD
- NYJ – Josh McCown – 26/36, 331 yards, TD

**Top rushers**

- KC – Alex Smith – 1 carries, 70 yards
- NYJ – Matt Forte – 15 carries, 58 yards

**Top receivers**

- KC – Tyreek Hill – 6 receptions, 185 yards, 2 TD
- NYJ – Jermaine Kearse – 9 receptions, 157 yards

Thanks to a successful game-winning drive aided by several defensive mistakes and penalties against Kansas City, the Jets were able to improve to 5–7.

==== Week 14: at Denver Broncos ====
Week Fourteen: New York Jets at Denver Broncos – Game summary

Quarter	1	2	3	4	Total
Jets	0	0	0	0	**0**
**Broncos**	10	3	7	3	**23**

at Sports Authority Field at Mile High, Denver, Colorado

- Date: December 10
- Game time: 4:05 p.m. EST/2:05 p.m. MST
- Game weather: 60 °F (16 °C), sunny
- Game attendance: 75,518
- Referee: Tony Corrente
- TV announcers (CBS): Greg Gumbel, Trent Green and Jamie Erdahl
- Recap, Gamebook

Game information

**First quarter**

- DEN – Brandon McManus 31-yard field goal, 9:02. Broncos 3–0. **Drive: 12 plays, 62 yards, 5:58.**
- DEN – Demaryius Thomas 20-yard pass from Trevor Siemian (Brandon McManus kick), 7:16. Broncos 10–0. **Drive: 2 plays, 20 yards, 0:12.**

**Second quarter**

- DEN – Brandon McManus 53-yard field goal, 0:32. Broncos 13–0. **Drive: 10 plays, 28 yards, 5:58.**

**Third quarter**

- DEN – Andy Janovich 1-yard run (Brandon McManus kick), 6:30. Broncos 20–0. **Drive: 13 plays, 68 yards, 6:19.**

**Fourth quarter**

- DEN – Brandon McManus 40-yard field goal, 11:33. Broncos 23–0. **Drive: 8 plays, 37 yards, 4:44.**

**Top passers**

- NYJ – Josh McCown – 6/12, 46 yards, INT
- DEN – Trevor Siemian – 19/31, 200 yards, TD

**Top rushers**

- NYJ – Bilal Powell – 13 rushes, 35 yards
- DEN – C. J. Anderson – 22 rushes, 48 yards

**Top receivers**

- NYJ – Robby Anderson – 3 receptions, 27 yards
- DEN – Demaryius Thomas – 8 receptions, 93 yards, TD

With the shutout loss the Jets dropped to 5–8, ensuring their second straight non-winning season.

==== Week 15: at New Orleans Saints ====
Week Fifteen: New York Jets at New Orleans Saints – Game summary

Quarter	1	2	3	4	Total
Jets	0	10	3	6	**19**
**Saints**	10	7	0	14	**31**

at Mercedes-Benz Superdome, New Orleans, Louisiana

- Date: December 17
- Game time: 1:00 p.m. EST/12:00 p.m. CST
- Game weather: Played indoors (dome stadium)
- Game attendance: 73,018
- Referee: Ronald Torbert
- TV announcers (CBS): Kevin Harlan, Rich Gannon and Otis Livingston
- Recap, Gamebook

Game information

**First quarter**

- NO – Wil Lutz 23-yard field goal, 11:36. Saints 3–0. **Drive: 7 plays, 71 yards, 3:24.**
- NO – Mark Ingram II 1-yard run (Wil Lutz kick), 3:07. Saints 10–0. **Drive: 13 plays, 82 yards, 5:25.**

**Second quarter**

- NYJ – Bilal Powell 2-yard run (Chandler Catanzaro kick), 10:58. Saints 10–7. **Drive: 12 plays, 75 yards, 7:09.**
- NO – Alvin Kamara 10-yard pass from Drew Brees (Wil Lutz kick), 6:12. Saints 17–7. **Drive: 8 plays, 75 yards, 4:46.**
- NYJ – Chandler Catanzaro 29-yard field goal, 0:09. Saints 17–10. **Drive: 4 plays, 0 yards, 1:05.**

**Third quarter**

- NYJ – Chandler Catanzaro 26-yard field goal, 8:07. Saints 17–13. **Drive: 9 plays, 58 yards, 3:49.**

**Fourth quarter**

- NO – Michael Thomas 4-yard pass from Drew Brees (Wil Lutz kick), 7:39. Saints 24–13. **Drive: 9 plays, 64 yards, 4:43.**
- NYJ – Elijah McGuire 2-yard pass from Bryce Petty (pass failed), 1:51. Saints 24–19. **Drive: 6 plays, 70 yards, 1:32.**
- NO – Mark Ingram II 50-yard run (Wil Lutz kick), 1:33. Saints 31–19. **Drive: 2 plays, 55 yards, 0:18.**

**Top passers**

- NYJ – Bryce Petty – 19/39, 179 yards, TD, 2 INT
- NO – Drew Brees – 26/36, 281 yards, 2 TD, INT

**Top rushers**

- NYJ – Bilal Powell – 13 carries, 44 yards, TD
- NO – Mark Ingram II – 12 carries, 74 yards, 2 TD

**Top receivers**

- NYJ – Elijah McGuire – 3 receptions, 48 yards, TD
- NO – Michael Thomas – 9 receptions, 93 yards, TD

With the loss the Jets dropped to 5-9 and they were eliminated from playoff contention for the 8th straight year. This was also their second losing season in a row.

==== Week 16: vs. Los Angeles Chargers ====
Week Sixteen: Los Angeles Chargers at New York Jets – Game summary

Quarter	1	2	3	4	Total
**Chargers**	0	7	7	0	**14**
Jets	0	0	7	0	**7**

at MetLife Stadium, East Rutherford, New Jersey

- Date: December 24
- Game time: 1:00 p.m. EST
- Game weather: 40 °F (4 °C)
- Game attendance: 77,562
- Referee: Clete Blakeman
- TV announcers (CBS): Ian Eagle, Dan Fouts and Evan Washburn
- Recap, Gamebook

Game information

**First quarter**

- No scoring plays.

**Second quarter**

- LAC – Antonio Gates 3-yard pass from Philip Rivers (Nick Rose kick), 8:55. Chargers 7–0. **Drive: 12 plays, 71 yards, 5:46.**

**Third quarter**

- NYJ – Bilal Powell 57-yard run (Chandler Catanzaro kick), 10:00. Tied 7–7. **Drive: 3 plays, 63 yards, 1:22.**
- LAC – Melvin Gordon 1-yard run (Nick Rose kick), 4:57. Chargers 14–7. **Drive: 8 plays, 75 yards, 5:03.**

**Fourth quarter**

- No scoring plays.

**Top passers**

- LAC – Philip Rivers – 22/40, 290 yards, TD
- NYJ – Bryce Petty – 15/28, 119 yards, INT

**Top rushers**

- LAC – Melvin Gordon – 19 carries, 81 yards, TD
- NYJ – Bilal Powell – 19 carries, 145 yards, TD

**Top receivers**

- LAC – Robby Anderson – 5 receptions, 51 yards
- NYJ – Antonio Gates – 6 receptions, 81 yards, TD

==== Week 17: at New England Patriots ====
Week Seventeen: New York Jets at New England Patriots – Game summary

Quarter	1	2	3	4	Total
Jets	3	0	0	3	**6**
**Patriots**	7	14	3	2	**26**

at Gillette Stadium, Foxborough, Massachusetts

- Date: December 31
- Game time: 1:00 p.m. EST
- Game weather: 13 °F (−11 °C), cloudy and cold
- Game attendance: 65,878
- Referee: Brad Allen
- TV announcers (CBS): Jim Nantz, Tony Romo and Tracy Wolfson
- Recap, Gamebook

Game information

**First quarter**

- NE – Dion Lewis 3-yard run (Stephen Gostkowski kick), 9:30. Patriots 7–0. **Drive: 13 plays, 75 yards, 5:30.**
- NYJ – Chandler Catanzaro 48-yard field goal, 1:42. Patriots 7–3. **Drive: 7 plays, 52 yards, 3:10.**

**Second quarter**

- NE – Brandin Cooks 5-yard pass from Tom Brady (Stephen Gostkowski kick), 4:14. Patriots 14–3. **Drive: 10 plays, 73 yards, 4:23.**
- NE – Dion Lewis 5-yard pass from Tom Brady (Stephen Gostkowski kick), 0:20. Patriots 21–3. **Drive: 9 plays, 58 yards, 1:41.**

**Third quarter**

- NE – Stephen Gostkowski 21-yard field goal, 1:29. Patriots 24–3. **Drive: 12 plays, 77 yards, 6:29.**

**Fourth quarter**

- NYJ – Chandler Catanzaro 35-yard field goal, 10:28. Patriots 24–6. **Drive: 8 plays, 79 yards, 3:03.**
- NE – Bryce Petty sacked in end zone by Eric Lee for safety, 6:04. Patriots 26–6.

**Top passers**

- NYJ – Bryce Petty – 19/36, 232 yards
- NE – Tom Brady – 18/37, 190 yards, 2 TD

**Top rushers**

- NYJ – Bilal Powell – 13 rushes, 46 yards
- NE – Dion Lewis – 26 rushes, 93 yards, TD

**Top receivers**

- NYJ – Neal Sterling – 5 receptions, 74 yards
- NE – Brandin Cooks – 5 receptions, 79 yards, TD

With their 4th straight loss to New England the Jets ended the year duplicating their 2016 record at 5–11.

=== Standings ===
==== Division ====
AFC East
	W	L	T	PCT	DIV	CONF	PF	PA	STK
^{(1)} New England Patriots	13	3	0	.813	5–1	10–2	458	296	W3
^{(6)} Buffalo Bills	9	7	0	.563	3–3	7–5	302	359	W1
Miami Dolphins	6	10	0	.375	2–4	5–7	281	393	L3
New York Jets	5	11	0	.313	2–4	5–7	298	382	L4

==== Conference ====
AFC
#	Team	Division	W	L	T	PCT	DIV	CONF	SOS	SOV	STK
**Division leaders**
1 (Note: New England claimed the No. 1 seed over Pittsburgh based on head-to-head victory.)	New England Patriots	East	13	3	0	.813	5–1	10–2	.484	.466	W3
2	Pittsburgh Steelers	North	13	3	0	.813	6–0	10–2	.453	.423	W2
3 (Note: Jacksonville claimed the No. 3 seed over Kansas City based on conference record.)	Jacksonville Jaguars	South	10	6	0	.625	4–2	9–3	.434	.394	L2
4	Kansas City Chiefs	West	10	6	0	.625	5–1	8–4	.477	.481	W4
**Wild Cards**
5 (Note: Tennessee finished ahead of Buffalo, Baltimore and Los Angeles Chargers based on conference record, claiming the No. 5 seed. Buffalo and Baltimore finished ahead of Los Angeles Chargers based on conference record. Buffalo claimed the No. 6 seed over Baltimore based on strength of victory.)	Tennessee Titans	South	9	7	0	.563	5–1	8–4	.434	.396	W1
6	Buffalo Bills	East	9	7	0	.563	3–3	7–5	.492	.396	W1
**Did not qualify for the postseason**
7	Baltimore Ravens	North	9	7	0	.563	3–3	7–5	.441	.299	L1
8	Los Angeles Chargers	West	9	7	0	.563	3–3	6–6	.457	.347	W2
9	Cincinnati Bengals	North	7	9	0	.438	3–3	6–6	.465	.321	W2
10 (Note: Oakland finished ahead of Miami based on head-to-head victory.)	Oakland Raiders	West	6	10	0	.375	2–4	5–7	.512	.396	L4
11	Miami Dolphins	East	6	10	0	.375	2–4	5–7	.543	.531	L3
12 (Note: Denver finished ahead of the New York Jets based on head-to-head victory.)	Denver Broncos	West	5	11	0	.313	2–4	4–8	.492	.413	L2
13	New York Jets	East	5	11	0	.313	2–4	5–7	.520	.438	L4
14 (Note: Indianapolis finished ahead of Houston based on head-to-head sweep.)	Indianapolis Colts	South	4	12	0	.250	2–4	3–9	.480	.219	W1
15	Houston Texans	South	4	12	0	.250	1–5	3–9	.516	.375	L6
16	Cleveland Browns	North	0	16	0	.000	0–6	0–12	.520	–	L16
**Tiebreakers** (Note: When breaking ties for three or more teams under the NFL's rules, they are first broken within divisions, then comparing only the highest ranked remaining team from each division.)
