= Jermaine Kearse =

American football player and coach (born 1990)

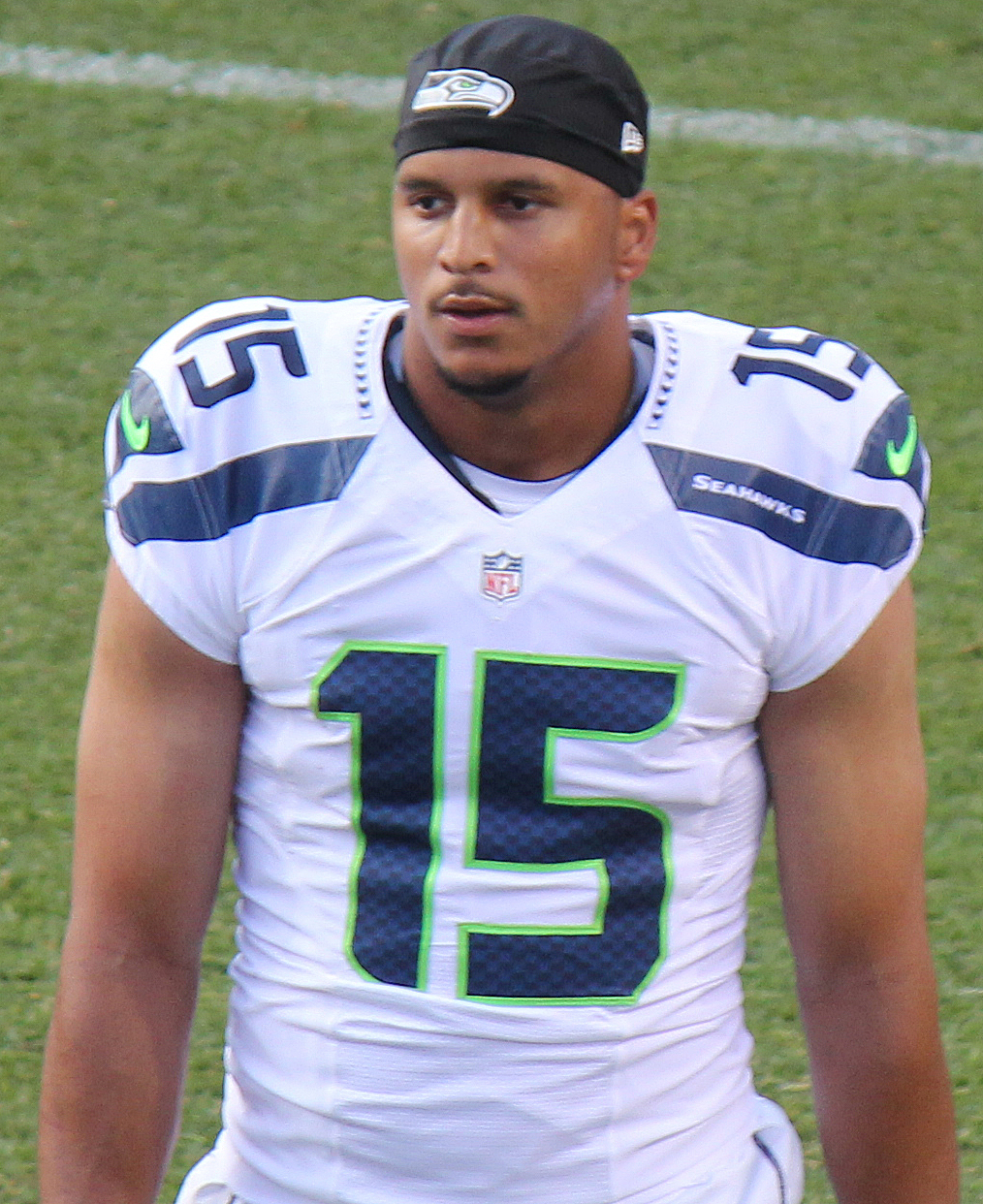
- Kearse with the Seattle Seahawks in 2014

Washington Huskies
- Title: Program assistant

Personal information
- Born: February 6, 1990 (age 36); Lakewood, Washington, U.S.
- Listed height: 6 ft 1 in (1.85 m)
- Listed weight: 209 lb (95 kg)

Career information
- Position: Wide receiver (No. 11, 15, 10)
- High school: Lakes (Lakewood)
- College: Washington (2008–2011)
- NFL draft: 2012: undrafted

Career history

Playing
- Seattle Seahawks (2012–2016); New York Jets (2017–2018); Detroit Lions (2019)*
- * Offseason or practice squad member only

Coaching
- Washington (2021–present) Graduate assistant

Awards and highlights
- Super Bowl champion (XLVIII); 2× Second-team All-Pac-10 (2009–2010)

Career NFL statistics
- Receptions: 255
- Receiving yards: 3,290
- Receiving touchdowns: 17
- Stats at Pro Football Reference

Jermaine Levan Kearse (born February 6, 1990) is an American former professional football player who was a wide receiver for eight seasons in the National Football League (NFL). He played college football for the Washington Huskies. Kearse was signed by the Seattle Seahawks as an undrafted free agent in 2012 and later won Super Bowl XLVIII with the team. After five seasons with the Seahawks, Kearse played two more seasons for the New York Jets from 2017 to 2018. In 2019, he joined the Detroit Lions, but missed the entire season due to injury.

== Early life ==
Kearse grew up as a military brat; his father was a non-commissioned officer in the U.S. Army. While living at Fort Lewis (now Joint Base Lewis–McChord), south of Tacoma, Washington, he attended Lakes High School in Lakewood and played high school football for the Lancers. As a senior, he caught 54 passes for 903 yards and eight touchdowns.

== College career ==
Kearse attended the University of Washington in Seattle, playing for the Huskies of the Pac-12 Conference. In his time there, he played under head coaches Tyrone Willingham and Steve Sarkesian. As a true freshman in 2008, he played in all 12 games, with two starts, and had 20 receptions for 301 yards and two touchdowns. As a sophomore in 2009 in his first season with Sarkesian, Kearse started nine of 12 games and led the team in receptions with 50; yards with 866; and touchdowns with eight. He was named a second-team All-Pac-10 selection.

As a junior in 2010, Kearse started all 13 games and again led the team in receptions with 63 for 1,005 yards and 12 touchdowns. He was named second-team All-Pac-10 for the second consecutive year. As a senior in 2011, he had 47 receptions for 699 yards and seven touchdowns.

== Professional career ==
Pre-draft measurables
Height	Weight	Arm length	Hand span	Wingspan	40-yard dash	10-yard split	20-yard split	20-yard shuttle	Three-cone drill	Vertical jump	Broad jump	Bench press
6 ft 0 7/8 in (1.85 m)	209 lb (95 kg)	32 1/8 in (0.82 m)	9 1/4 in (0.23 m)	6 ft 3 3/8 in (1.91 m)	4.43 s	1.50 s	2.56 s	4.12 s	6.83 s	35.5 in (0.90 m)	10 ft 8 in (3.25 m)	14 reps
All values from NFL Combine/Pro Day

=== Seattle Seahawks ===
==== 2012 season ====
Kearse was signed by the Seattle Seahawks as an undrafted free agent on April 28, 2012. he made his NFL debut on November 4 and had a six-yard reception against the Minnesota Vikings. He appeared in seven games as a rookie for Seattle in 2012, finishing with three catches for 31 yards and playing on special teams. Kearse underwent LASIK surgery during the offseason to improve his vision.

==== 2013 season ====
During the 2013 season in a Week 1 game against the Carolina Panthers, Kearse caught a 43-yard touchdown pass from quarterback Russell Wilson late in the fourth quarter to lift the Seahawks to a 12–7 score. The score was the first of Kearse's professional career.

In a Week 5 game against the Indianapolis Colts, Kearse had a 28-yard reception for a touchdown, and blocked a punt which resulted in a safety in the 34–28 loss. In Week 10 against the Atlanta Falcons, he scored a 43-yard touchdown after a trick play when Marshawn Lynch threw the ball back to Russell Wilson in the 33–10 victory. In 2013, Kearse played 15 games with 346 receiving yards and four touchdowns.

In the NFC Championship on January 19, 2014, against division rival San Francisco 49ers, Kearse caught a 35-yard touchdown pass from Wilson. The Seahawks eventually won the game 23–17 and advanced to Super Bowl XLVIII. During the Super Bowl against the Denver Broncos, Kearse had four catches for 65 yards including a 23-yard touchdown catch in the third quarter, breaking four tackles to get into the endzone. The Seahawks won 43–8, giving Kearse and the team their first Super Bowl win in franchise history.

==== 2014 season ====
In the 2014 regular season, Kearse played 15 games with 537 receiving yards and a touchdown. In Week 5, against the Washington Redskins, he caught his lone touchdown of the season in the 27–17 victory.

In Week 3, in a Super Bowl XLVIII rematch against the Denver Broncos, Kearse threw the first pass of his NFL career, a 17-yard pass to Russell Wilson, in the 26–20 overtime victory.

In the Divisional Round against the Carolina Panthers, Kearse continued his streak of catching touchdowns in postseason games with a 63-yard catch-and-run in the second quarter, catching the ball with one hand. He would catch two other passes in the game, each going for 33 yards, and lead all receivers with 129 receiving yards on his three catches. The Seahawks won 31–17 and advanced to the NFC Championship.

In the NFC Championship against the Green Bay Packers, Kearse caught his only completion, a 35-yard game-winning overtime touchdown to give Seattle a 28–22 win after falling behind 16–0 at halftime. The victory sent the Seahawks to the Super Bowl for the second year in a row. Kearse had been targeted on five throws earlier in the game, the first four being intercepted (two of them tipped by Kearse) and the fifth being incomplete. It was the fourth straight postseason game in which Kearse caught a touchdown pass.

In the final minute of Super Bowl XLIX, Kearse caught the ball after a Wilson pass was tipped by cornerback Malcolm Butler and the ball bounced four times off Kearse's body before he secured the ball. The play seemingly looked to be a remake of the Helmet Catch. However, Butler intercepted Wilson at the goal line with under 30 seconds remaining, therefore foiling the Seahawks a chance for the second championship in a row as they lost to the Patriots 28–24.

==== 2015 season ====
In the 2015 season, Kearse caught eight passes for 76 yards in the season-opening 34–31 overtime loss in St. Louis against the Rams, setting a new single-game high for receptions (breaking his previous record of five). In Week 5 in Cincinnati, Kearse caught his first touchdown of the season on a 30-yard pass from Wilson in the 27–24 loss. In Week 11 against the Pittsburgh Steelers, Kearse recorded four receptions for 47 yards and two touchdowns, in the 39–30 victory for his first career multi-touchdown game. In Week 15, against the Cleveland Browns, he had a career-high 110 receiving yards in the 30–13 victory. Kearse started all 16 games for the first time of his career and finished the year with 685 receiving yards and a career-high five touchdowns.

In the Divisional Round against the Carolina Panthers, Kearse had 11 receptions for 110 yards and two touchdowns as the Seahawks lost by a score of 31–24.

==== 2016 season ====
In the 2016 season, Kearse caught 41 passes for 511 yards and one touchdown. Seattle won the NFC West and made the playoffs. His lone touchdown came in Week 16, against the Arizona Cardinals in the 34–31 defeat on Christmas Eve. They defeated the Detroit Lions in the Wild Card Round before falling to the eventual NFC Champion Atlanta Falcons in the Divisional Round.

=== New York Jets ===
==== 2017 season ====
On September 1, 2017, Kearse, along with a 2018 second-round draft pick, were traded to the New York Jets in exchange for defensive tackle Sheldon Richardson.

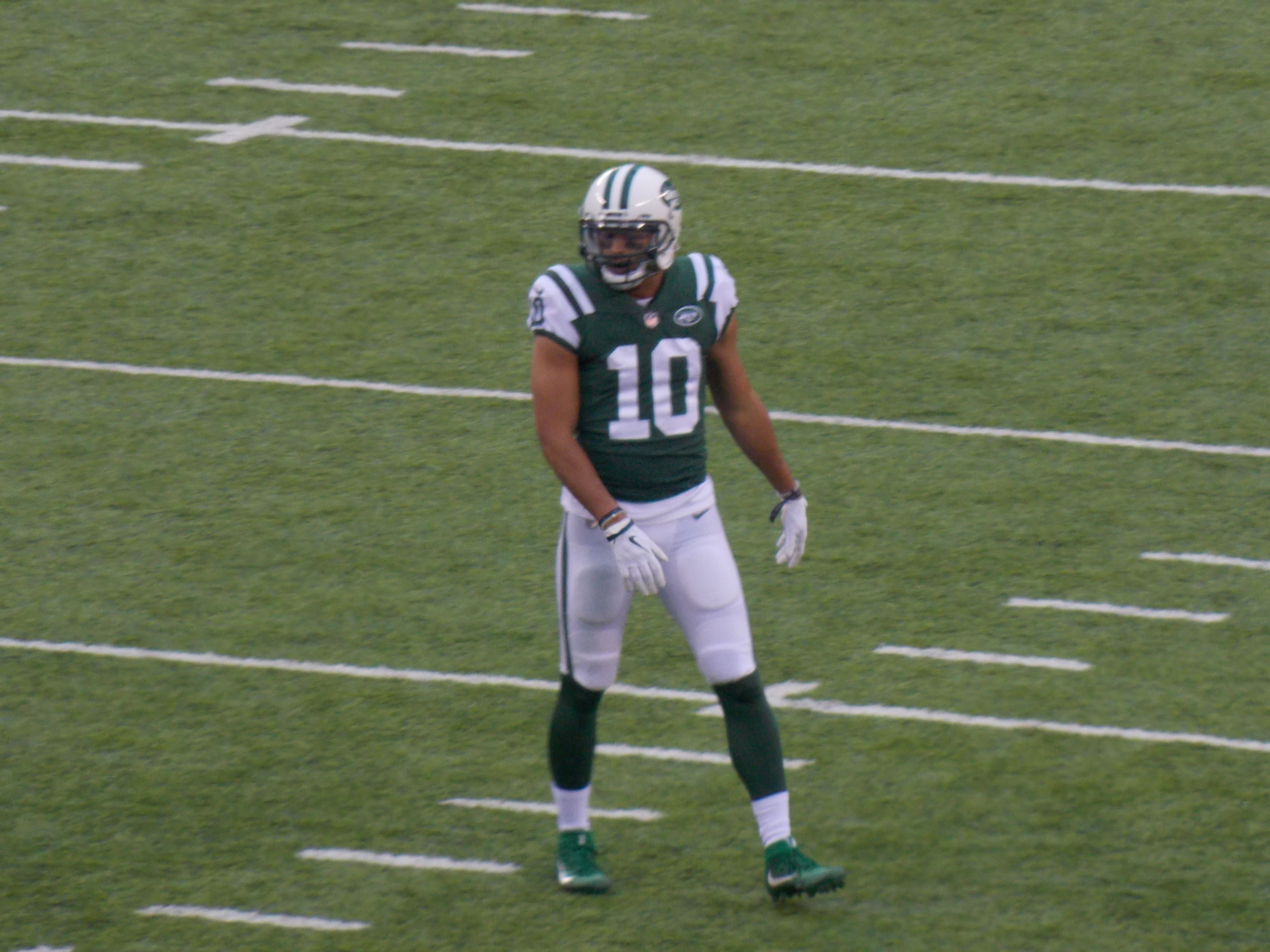
Kearse with the Jets on December 3, 2017

On September 10, in the season opener, Kearse made his Jets debut, recording seven receptions for 59 yards in the 21–12 loss to the Buffalo Bills. In Week 2, against the Oakland Raiders, he had four receptions for 64 yards and his first two receiving touchdowns with the Jets, both coming from quarterback Josh McCown. His performance against the Raiders was only the second multi-touchdown game of his career. During Week 12 against the Carolina Panthers, Kearse had 7 receptions for 105 receiving yards and a touchdown. He and fellow receiver Robby Anderson both had over 100 receiving yards in the same game in a Jets lost 35–27. During Week 13 against the Kansas City Chiefs, Kearse had another outstanding performance, highlighted by a spectacular one-handed catch by the sideline boundary line and a 51-yard reception play later in the game. He finished the game with 9 receptions and 157 receiving yards as the Jets won 38–31. Overall, in the 2017 season, he finished with 65 receptions for 810 receiving yards and five receiving touchdowns.

==== 2018 season ====
In Week 6, against the Indianapolis Colts, he had nine receptions for a season-high 94 yards. He had his first receiving touchdown of the season in Week 11 against the New England Patriots. He finished the 2018 season with 37 receptions for 371 receiving yards and one receiving touchdown.

=== Detroit Lions ===
On June 6, 2019, Kearse signed with the Detroit Lions. On August 8, 2019, Kearse suffered a broken leg early in the first quarter in Week 1 of the preseason against the New England Patriots. He was placed on injured reserve on August 10, 2019.

Kearse announced his retirement on September 29, 2020.

== Career statistics ==
Legend
	Won the Super Bowl
**Bold**	Career high

=== NFL ===
Year	Team	Games		Receiving					Rushing					Fumbles	
Year	Team	GP	GS	Rec	Yds	Avg	Lng	TD	Att	Yds	Avg	Lng	TD	Fum	Lost
2012	SEA	7	1	3	31	10.3	17	0	—	—	—	—	—	0	0
2013	SEA	15	5	22	346	**15.7**	43	4	—	—	—	—	—	**1**	0
2014	SEA	15	14	38	537	14.1	**60**	1	**2**	**15**	**7.5**	**11**	0	0	0
2015	SEA	16	16	49	685	14.0	50	**5**	—	—	—	—	—	**1**	0
2016	SEA	16	15	41	510	12.5	36	1	—	—	—	—	—	0	0
2017	NYJ	16	14	**65**	**810**	12.5	51	**5**	—	—	—	—	—	**1**	0
2018	NYJ	14	9	37	371	10	29	1	—	—	—	—	—	0	0
Career		99	74	255	3,290	12.9	60	17	2	15	7.5	11	0	3	0

=== College ===
Season	Team	GP	Receiving				Rushing				Scrimmage			
Season	Team	GP	Rec	Yds	Avg	TD	Att	Yds	Avg	TD	Tch	Yds	Avg	TD
2008	Washington	12	20	301	15.1	2	0	0	0.0	0	20	301	15.1	2
2009	Washington	12	50	866	**17.3**	8	1	2	2.0	0	51	868	**17**	8
2010	Washington	13	**63**	**1,005**	16.0	**12**	0	0	0.0	0	**63**	**1,005**	16	**12**
2011	Washington	13	47	699	14.9	7	**2**	**13**	**6.5**	**1**	49	712	14.5	8
Total		50	180	2,871	16.0	29	3	15	5.0	1	183	2,886	15.8	30

== Business ventures and endorsements ==
On July 28, 2017, Kitsap Credit Union and Jermaine Kearse announced a formal partnership. Kearse acted as the credit union's celebrity spokesperson from August 2017 through April 2018.

== Personal life ==
Kearse married Marisa Ventura. The couple have two daughters. Kearse is a Christian.

Kearse is currently a program assistant at the University of Washington.

== See also ==
- Washington Huskies football statistical leaders
