= Mike Pennel =

American football player (born 1991)

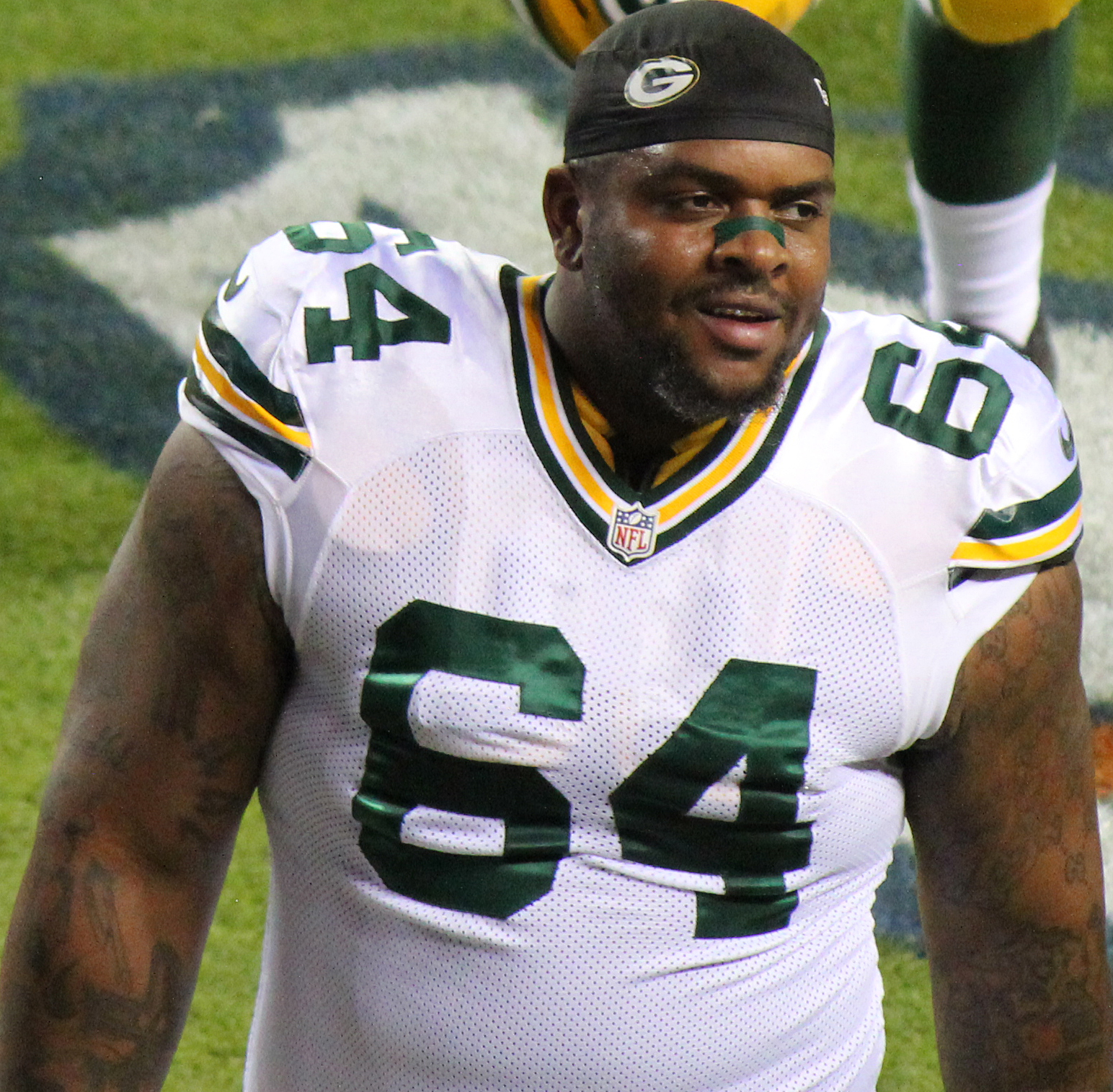
- Pennel with the Green Bay Packers in 2015

Profile
- Position: Nose tackle

Personal information
- Born: May 9, 1991 (age 35); Topeka, Kansas, U.S.
- Listed height: 6 ft 4 in (1.93 m)
- Listed weight: 330 lb (150 kg)

Career information
- High school: Grandview (Aurora, Colorado)
- College: Scottsdale CC (2010–2011); Arizona State (2012); CSU Pueblo (2013)
- NFL draft: 2014: undrafted

Career history
- Green Bay Packers (2014–2016); New York Jets (2017–2018); New England Patriots (2019)*; Kansas City Chiefs (2019–2020); Chicago Bears (2021)*; Atlanta Falcons (2021); Chicago Bears (2022); Kansas City Chiefs (2023–2024); Cincinnati Bengals (2025); Kansas City Chiefs (2025)
- * Offseason or practice squad member only

Awards and highlights
- 2× Super Bowl champion (LIV, LVIII)

Career NFL statistics as of 2025
- Total tackles: 257
- Sacks: 5.0
- Forced fumbles: 3
- Fumble recoveries: 1
- Stats at Pro Football Reference

Michael Maurice Pennel Jr. (born May 9, 1991) is an American professional football nose tackle. He played college football for the Scottsdale Fighting Artichokes, the Arizona State Sun Devils and the CSU Pueblo ThunderWolves. He was signed by the Green Bay Packers as an undrafted free agent in 2014, and has also played for the New York Jets, Kansas City Chiefs, Atlanta Falcons, Chicago Bears, and Cincinnati Bengals.

== College career ==
Pennel played college football at Scottsdale Community College, Arizona State University and Colorado State University Pueblo. He was suspended indefinitely by Arizona State in 2012 and transferred to Colorado State University Pueblo.

== Professional career ==
Pre-draft measurables
| Height | Weight | Arm length | Hand span | 40-yard dash | 10-yard split | 20-yard split | 20-yard shuttle | Three-cone drill | Vertical jump | Broad jump | Bench press |
|---|---|---|---|---|---|---|---|---|---|---|---|
| 6 ft 4 1/4 in (1.94 m) | 332 lb (151 kg) | 33 3/8 in (0.85 m) | 9 7/8 in (0.25 m) | 5.23 s | 1.82 s | 3.03 s | 4.84 s | 7.94 s | 28.5 in (0.72 m) | 8 ft 8 in (2.64 m) | 23 reps |
All values are from NFL Combine/Pro Day

=== Green Bay Packers ===
After going unselected in the 2014 NFL draft, Pennel signed with the Green Bay Packers on May 12, 2014. Pennel joined Jayrone Elliott as undrafted players to make the Packers' roster. During his rookie season in 2014, Pennel made 13 game appearances with 8 tackles.

In 2015, Pennel appeared in all 16 games with 5 starts, recording 24 tackles, one sack, and one forced fumble.

On February 19, 2016, Pennel was suspended for the first four games of the 2016 season due to violating the league's substance abuse policy. Pennel was then suspended for the final four games of the season for again violating the league's substance abuse policy. In the 2016 season, Pennel finished with seven tackles and a pass defended.

On January 9, 2017, Pennel was released by the Packers.

=== New York Jets ===
On February 6, 2017, Pennel was claimed off waivers by the New York Jets. He re-signed with the Jets on March 16. He played in all 16 games in 2017, recording a career-high 35 tackles.

On March 16, 2018, Pennel signed a three-year contract with the Jets.

On February 19, 2019, the Jets declined the option on Pennel's contract, making him a free agent at the start of the new league year.

=== New England Patriots ===
On March 14, 2019, Pennel signed a two-year contract with the New England Patriots. On August 26, Pennel was released by the Patriots.

=== Kansas City Chiefs (first stint) ===
On October 19, 2019, the Kansas City Chiefs signed Pennel.

On January 19, 2020, Pennel helped the Chiefs defeat the Tennessee Titans in the AFC Championship Game. In Super Bowl LIV, Pennel recorded one tackle in the Chiefs' 31–20 victory over the San Francisco 49ers.

On April 6, 2020, Pennel was re-signed to a one-year contract. On August 25, he was suspended for the first two games of the 2020 season. On September 23, he was reinstated from suspension and activated to the roster.

=== Chicago Bears (first stint) ===
On June 18, 2021, Pennel signed a one-year deal with the Chicago Bears. On August 24, he was placed on injured reserve and released from the Bears on August 31.

=== Atlanta Falcons ===
On September 15, 2021, Pennel was signed to the practice squad of the Atlanta Falcons. On October 5, Pennel was promoted to the Falcons' active roster after cornerback Isaiah Oliver suffered a knee injury in Week 4 against the Washington Football Team.

=== Chicago Bears (second stint) ===
On June 13, 2022, Pennel signed with the Bears. He was released on September 9 from the 53-man roster, and re-signed to the practice squad the following day. Dieter Eiselen was promoted to the active roster in his place. On September 12, in a flurry of moves, Pennel was promoted to the active roster. In Week 6 against the Patriots, he was ejected for delivering a blind-sided block that concussed center David Andrews. Pennel appeared in all 17 games for the Bears, where he recorded 26 total tackles and one forced fumble.

=== Kansas City Chiefs (second stint) ===
On October 24, 2023, Pennel was signed to the Chiefs' practice squad. Pennel helped the Chiefs reach Super Bowl LVIII, where they defeated the 49ers 25–22 which gave Pennel his second Super Bowl ring. Pennel had six tackles in the game and was instrumental in limiting the effectiveness of the 49ers' running game in the second half.

On March 13, 2024, Pennel re-signed with the Chiefs.

On March 24, 2025, Pennel re-signed with the Chiefs on a one-year contract. On August 26, he was released as part of final roster cuts.

=== Cincinnati Bengals ===
On September 1, 2025, Pennel was signed to the Cincinnati Bengals' practice squad. He was elevated to the active roster for Week 1, and signed to the active roster on September 9. On October 28, Pennel requested and was granted his release by the Bengals.

=== Kansas City Chiefs (third stint) ===
On October 29, 2025, Pennel was signed to the Kansas City Chiefs' active roster.

== Legal issues ==
In April 2026, Pennel was named a person of interest in the disappearance of Carli Franchesca Guzmán Roche, a 22-year-old woman missing since 2021, after her body was found on property in Puerto Plata, Dominican Republic, formerly owned by Pennel. Pennel's attorney denied any involvement between Pennel and Guzmán. Later investigations revealed Pennel and Guzmán did know each other, with Pennel visiting Guzmán while he visited the Dominican Republic.

Guzmán was reported missing by her family on September 11, 2021, and some days later, the police and her family went to Pennel's property and smelled a foul odor but did not investigate the source, Pennel's backyard. Pennel sold the property in 2025, and Guzmán's body was found when the new owners of the property were doing excavation work in January 2026. Her body was identified using DNA from her son. The case is being treated as a homicide.

On July 1, 2026, ESPN printed a retraction to the story that led to above mentioned allegations. It was proven that Pennel was not in the Dominican Republic at the time of, weeks prior or after, the disappearance of Guzman. Furthermore, Pennel was never under investigation by police in either the Dominican Republic or the United States.

== NFL career statistics ==
Legend
| | Won the Super Bowl |
| **Bold** | Career high |

=== Regular season ===
| Year | Team | Games | | Tackles | | | | | Interceptions | | | | | | Fumbles | |
| Year | Team | GP | GS | Cmb | Solo | Ast | Sck | Sfty | PD | Int | Yds | Avg | Lng | TD | FF | FR |
|---|---|---|---|---|---|---|---|---|---|---|---|---|---|---|---|---|
| 2014 | GB | 13 | 0 | 8 | 7 | 1 | 0.0 | 0 | 0 | 0 | 0 | 0.0 | 0 | 0 | 0 | 0 |
| 2015 | GB | 16 | 5 | 25 | 16 | 9 | 1.0 | 0 | 0 | 0 | 0 | 0.0 | 0 | 0 | 1 | 0 |
| 2016 | GB | 8 | 0 | 7 | 5 | 2 | 0.0 | 0 | 1 | 0 | 0 | 0.0 | 0 | 0 | 0 | 0 |
| 2017 | NYJ | 16 | 3 | **35** | **20** | 15 | 0.0 | 0 | 0 | 0 | 0 | 0.0 | 0 | 0 | 0 | 0 |
| 2018 | NYJ | 16 | **7** | 27 | 16 | 11 | 0.0 | 0 | 1 | 0 | 0 | 0.0 | 0 | 0 | 0 | 0 |
| 2019 | KC | 8 | 0 | 24 | 13 | 11 | 1.0 | 0 | 0 | 0 | 0 | 0.0 | 0 | 0 | 0 | 0 |
| 2020 | KC | 14 | 1 | 29 | 13 | **16** | 0.0 | 0 | 0 | 0 | 0 | 0.0 | 0 | 0 | 0 | 0 |
| 2021 | ATL | 10 | 0 | 21 | 9 | 12 | 0.0 | 0 | 0 | 0 | 0 | 0.0 | 0 | 0 | 0 | 0 |
| 2022 | CHI | **17** | 2 | 26 | 16 | 10 | 0.0 | 0 | **2** | 0 | 0 | 0.0 | 0 | 0 | **1** | **1** |
| 2023 | KC | 3 | 0 | 4 | 2 | 2 | 0.0 | 0 | 0 | 0 | 0 | 0.0 | 0 | 0 | 0 | 0 |
| 2024 | KC | **17** | **7** | 25 | 10 | 15 | **3.0** | 0 | 0 | 0 | 0 | 0.0 | 0 | 0 | **1** | 0 |
| Career | | 138 | 25 | 231 | 127 | 104 | 5.0 | 0 | 4 | 0 | 0 | 0 | 0 | 0 | 3 | 1 |

=== Postseason ===
| Year | Team | Games | | Tackles | | | | | Interceptions | | | | | | Fumbles | |
| Year | Team | GP | GS | Cmb | Solo | Ast | Sck | Sfty | PD | Int | Yds | Avg | Lng | TD | FF | FR |
|---|---|---|---|---|---|---|---|---|---|---|---|---|---|---|---|---|
| 2014 | GB | 2 | 0 | 1 | 1 | 0 | 0.0 | 0 | 0 | 0 | 0 | 0.0 | 0 | 0 | 0 | 0 |
| 2015 | GB | 2 | 0 | 2 | 2 | 0 | 0.0 | 0 | 0 | 0 | 0 | 0.0 | 0 | 0 | 0 | 0 |
| 2019 | KC | 3 | 2 | 7 | 2 | **5** | 0.0 | 0 | **1** | 0 | 0 | 0.0 | 0 | 0 | 0 | 0 |
| 2020 | KC | 3 | 0 | 1 | 0 | 1 | 0.0 | 0 | 0 | 0 | 0 | 0.0 | 0 | 0 | 0 | 0 |
| 2023 | KC | **4** | **3** | **12** | **7** | **5** | 0.0 | 0 | 0 | 0 | 0 | 0.0 | 0 | 0 | 0 | 0 |
| 2024 | KC | 1 | 0 | 1 | 0 | 1 | 0.0 | 0 | 0 | 0 | 0 | 0.0 | 0 | 0 | 0 | 0 |
| Career | | 15 | 5 | 24 | 10 | 14 | 0.0 | 0 | 1 | 0 | 0 | 0.0 | 0 | 0 | 0 | 0 |
