= Eric Tomlinson =

American football player (born 1992)

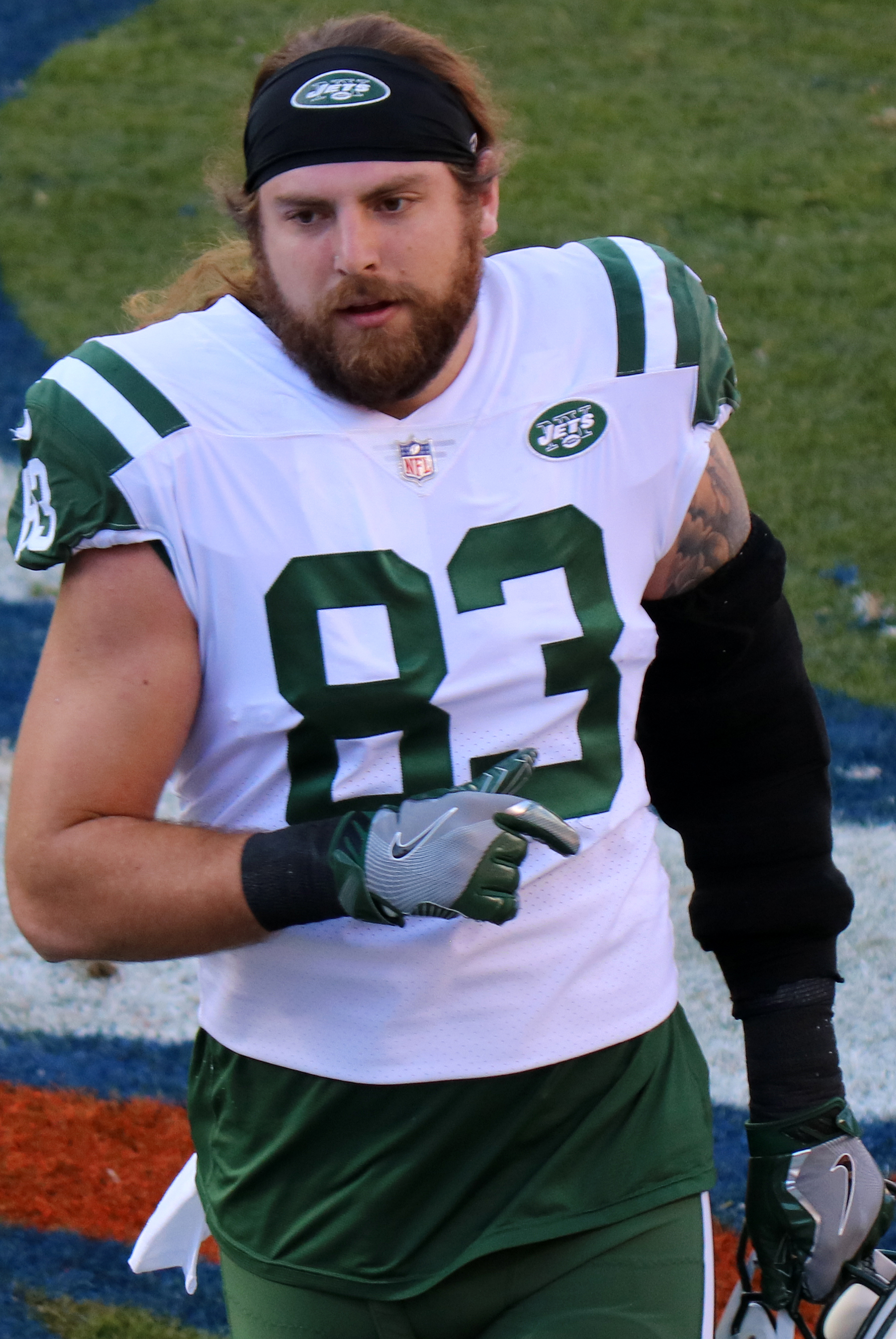
- Tomlinson with the New York Jets in 2017

Profile
- Position: Tight end

Personal information
- Born: April 22, 1992 (age 34); Oklahoma City, Oklahoma, U.S.
- Listed height: 6 ft 6 in (1.98 m)
- Listed weight: 263 lb (119 kg)

Career information
- High school: Klein (Klein, Texas)
- College: UTEP (2011–2014)
- NFL draft: 2015: undrafted

Career history
- Philadelphia Eagles (2015)*; Houston Texans (2015–2016)*; New York Jets (2016–2018); New York Giants (2019); New England Patriots (2019); Oakland Raiders (2019); New York Giants (2020); Baltimore Ravens (2020–2021); Denver Broncos (2022); Houston Texans (2023)*; Baltimore Ravens (2023)*; Indianapolis Colts (2023–2024)*; Los Angeles Chargers (2024)
- * Offseason or practice squad member only

Career NFL statistics as of 2024
- Receptions: 29
- Receiving yards: 289
- Receiving touchdowns: 3
- Stats at Pro Football Reference

Eric Tomlinson (born April 22, 1992) is an American professional football tight end. He played college football for the UTEP Miners and was signed by the Philadelphia Eagles as an undrafted free agent in 2015. He has previously played for the New York Jets, New England Patriots, New York Giants, Oakland Raiders, Baltimore Ravens, Denver Broncos, and Los Angeles Chargers.

== Early life ==
Tomlinson attended and played high school football at Klein High School.

== College career ==
Tomlinson attended and played college football at UTEP, where he contributed from 2011 to 2014.

=== Collegiate statistics ===
Eric Tomlinson						Receiving			
Year	School	Conf	Class	Pos	G	Rec	Yds	Avg	TD
2011	UTEP	CUSA	FR	TE	12	6	83	13.8	2
2012	UTEP	CUSA	SO	TE	10	4	26	6.5	0
2013	UTEP	CUSA	JR	TE	10	30	304	10.1	1
2014	UTEP	CUSA	SR	TE	8	19	134	7.1	1
Career	UTEP				40	59	547	9.3	4

== Professional career ==
=== Pre-draft ===
On December 11, 2014, it was announced that Tomlinson had accepted his invitation to appear in the NFLPA Collegiate Bowl, along with teammate Jameill Showers. On January 17, 2015, he played in the NFLPA Collegiate Bowl and was part of Mike Holmgren's American team that lost 17–0. Tomlinson was one of 19 collegiate tight ends to attend the NFL Scouting Combine in Indianapolis, Indiana. He had a mediocre performance overall, finishing ninth among his position group in the 40-yard dash and tenth in the bench press. On April 9, 2015, Tomlinson attended UTEP's pro day and performed the majority of combine drills again. He was able to have a better showing than his day at the combine and lowered his times in the 40-yard dash (4.77s), 20-yard dash (4.82s), and 10-yard dash (1.73s). His unofficial time in the 40-yard dash would've been the third best time among all tight ends who participated at the combine. At the conclusion of the pre-draft process, Tomlinson was projected to be an undrafted free agent by NFL draft experts and scouts. He was ranked the 20th best tight end prospect in the draft by NFLDraftScout.com.

Pre-draft measurables
Height	Weight	Arm length	Hand span	40-yard dash	10-yard split	20-yard split	20-yard shuttle	Three-cone drill	Vertical jump	Broad jump	Bench press
6 ft 5 5/8 in (1.97 m)	263 lb (119 kg)	32 7/8 in (0.84 m)	10 in (0.25 m)	4.77 s	1.73 s	2.82 s	4.54 s	7.46 s	31.0 in (0.79 m)	9 ft 2 in (2.79 m)	23 reps
All values from NFL Combine/Pro Day

=== Philadelphia Eagles ===
After going undrafted in the 2015 NFL draft, Tomlinson signed with the Philadelphia Eagles. He was released during final roster cuts on September 4, 2015.

=== Houston Texans (first stint) ===
On September 6, 2015, Tomlinson was signed to the Houston Texans' practice squad where he spent his entire rookie season. He was released on September 3, 2016, as part of final roster cuts. The next day, he was signed to the Texans' practice squad.

=== New York Jets ===
Tomlinson was signed by the New York Jets off the Texans' practice squad on November 5, 2016.

On September 10, 2017, Tomlinson recorded his first official receiving statistics in the season opener. He had two receptions for 25 yards in the 21–12 loss to the Buffalo Bills. On October 29, 2017, Tomlinson scored his first career touchdown on a 20-yard pass from Josh McCown in a game against the Atlanta Falcons.

In the 2018 season, Tomlinson played in 15 games with 12 starts, recording eight receptions for 72 yards before being placed on injured reserve on December 27, 2018.

On March 19, 2019, the Jets re-signed Tomlinson. He was released on August 31, 2019.

=== New York Giants (first stint) ===
On September 1, 2019, Tomlinson was claimed off waivers by the New York Giants. He was waived on September 24.

=== New England Patriots ===
On October 15, 2019, Tomlinson signed with the New England Patriots. In his debut game, he recorded one catch for one yard against his former team, the New York Jets. On October 29, 2019, Tomlinson was released by the Patriots.

=== Oakland Raiders ===
On December 11, 2019, Tomlinson was signed by the Oakland Raiders.

=== New York Giants (second stint) ===
On March 30, 2020, Tomlinson was signed by the New York Giants. He was released during final roster cuts on September 5, 2020, but was re-signed the next day. He was released on October 2, 2020, and re-signed to the practice squad the next day. He was promoted back to the active roster on October 6. He was waived on November 13, 2020.

=== Baltimore Ravens (first stint) ===
On November 23, 2020, Tomlinson was signed to the Baltimore Ravens practice squad. He was elevated to the active roster on December 2, 2020, December 8, 2020, December 14, 2020, and December 19, 2020, for the team's weeks 12, 13, 14, and 15 games against the Pittsburgh Steelers, Dallas Cowboys, Cleveland Browns, and Jacksonville Jaguars, and reverted to the practice squad after each game. He was promoted to the active roster on December 22, 2020. On February 10, 2021, Tomlinson signed a one-year contract extension with the Ravens. On August 31, 2021, Tomlinson was released, but re-signed the next day. He was released on November 1, 2021, and re-signed to the practice squad. On November 11, 2021, Tomlinson was promoted to the active roster.

=== Denver Broncos ===
On March 16, 2022, Tomlinson signed a one-year contract with the Denver Broncos. He was released by the Broncos during final roster cuts on August 30, 2022. On August 31, Tomlinson re-signed with the Broncos.

=== Houston Texans (second stint) ===
On May 3, 2023, Tomlinson signed with the Houston Texans. He was released on May 18. He was re-signed on July 24, 2023. He was released on August 29, 2023.

=== Baltimore Ravens (second stint) ===
On October 3, 2023, Tomlinson was signed to the Baltimore Ravens practice squad. He was released on November 14, 2023.

=== Indianapolis Colts ===
On January 2, 2024, Tomlinson was signed to the Indianapolis Colts practice squad. He signed a reserve/future contract on January 8. He was released on August 27.

=== Los Angeles Chargers ===
On August 29, 2024, Tomlinson was signed to the Los Angeles Chargers practice squad. He was promoted to the active roster on September 7.
