= Xavier Coleman =

American football player (born 1995)

No. 38
- Position: Cornerback

Personal information
- Born: January 13, 1995 (age 31); Honolulu, Hawaii, United States
- Listed height: 5 ft 11 in (1.80 m)
- Listed weight: 190 lb (86 kg)

Career information
- High school: Jesuit (Beaverton, Oregon)
- College: Portland State
- NFL draft: 2017: undrafted

Career history
- New York Jets (2017); Buffalo Bills (2018)*; San Diego Fleet (2019)
- * Offseason or practice squad member only
- Stats at Pro Football Reference

Xavier Coleman (born January 13, 1995) is an American former football cornerback. He played college football at Portland State.

== College career ==
Coleman was selected to the HM All-Big Sky Conference and was named PSU Team outstanding defensive back in his sophomore season in 2014. He was selected to the second team All-Big Sky Conference in his junior season in 2015.

== Professional career ==
=== New York Jets ===
Coleman signed with the New York Jets as an undrafted free agent on May 5, 2017. He was waived by the Jets on September 2, 2017, and was signed to the practice squad the next day. He was promoted to the active roster on October 14, 2017. He was placed on injured reserve on October 25, 2017.

On August 31, 2018, Coleman was waived by the Jets.

=== Buffalo Bills ===
On November 7, 2018, Coleman was signed to the Buffalo Bills practice squad.

=== San Diego Fleet ===
Coleman was signed by the San Diego Fleet of the Alliance of American Football on February 12, 2019. The league ceased operations in April 2019.
