= Frank Beltre =

Dominican American football player (born 1990)

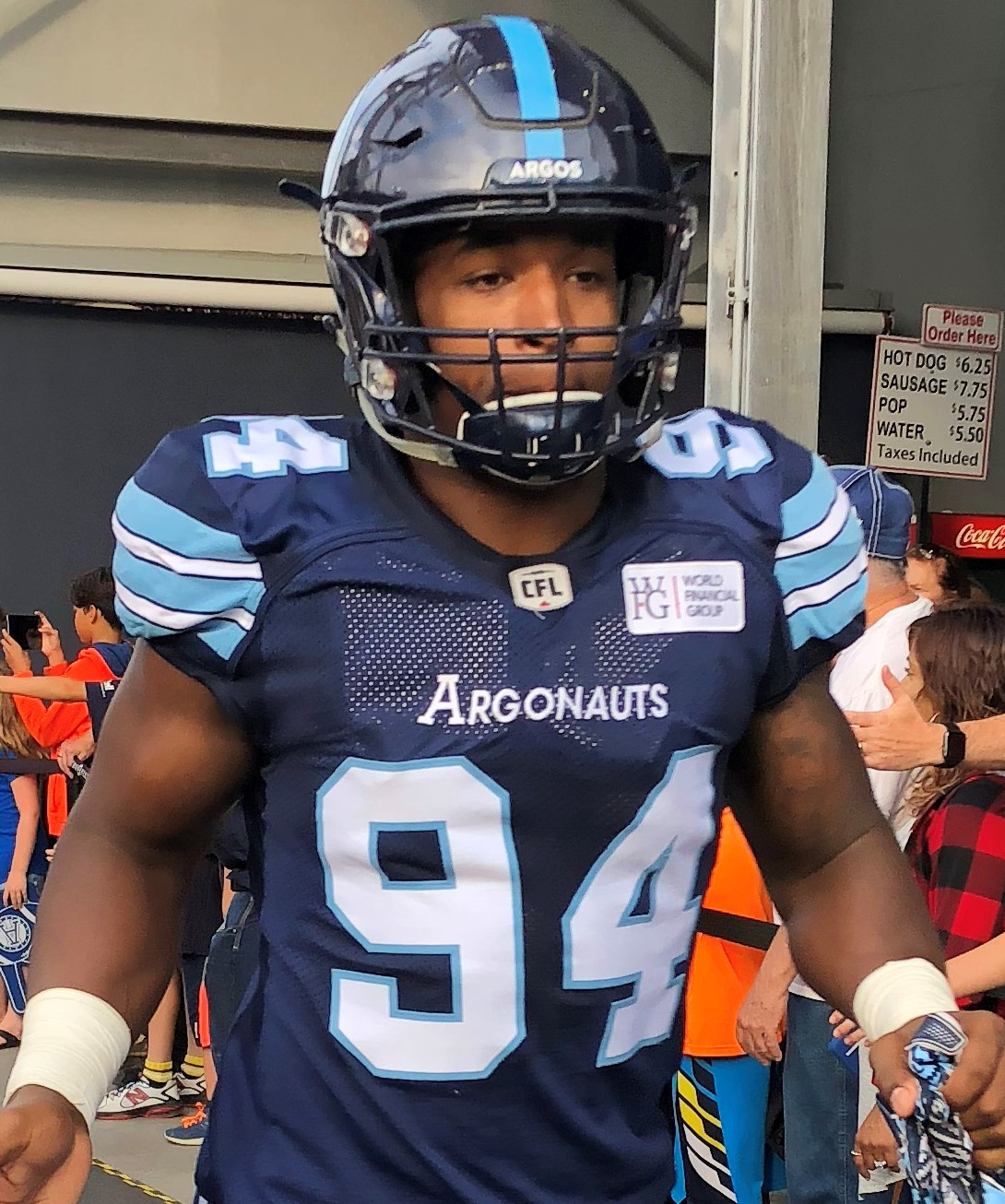
- Beltre with the Toronto Argonauts in 2018

No. 94
- Position: Defensive lineman

Personal information
- Born: January 28, 1990 (age 36); Azua, Dominican Republic
- Listed height: 6 ft 2 in (1.88 m)
- Listed weight: 250 lb (113 kg)

Career information
- High school: Randolph (Randolph, New Jersey, U.S.)
- College: Towson (2009–2012)

Career history
- San Diego Chargers (2013)*; Oakland Raiders (2014)*; Calgary Stampeders (2014–2016); New York Jets (2017)*; Toronto Argonauts (2018–2019); Ottawa Redblacks (2021)
- * Offseason or practice squad member only

Awards and highlights
- Grey Cup champion (2014); 2× All-CAA First-team (2011, 2012)
- Stats at Pro Football Reference
- Stats at CFL.ca

Frank Beltre-Montilla (born January 28, 1990) is a Dominican American former professional football defensive lineman. He played college football at Towson University. He was a member of the San Diego Chargers, Oakland Raiders, and New York Jets of the National Football League (NFL) and the Calgary Stampeders, Toronto Argonauts, and Ottawa Redblacks of the Canadian Football League (CFL).

== Early life ==
Beltre was born on January 28, 1990, in Azua, Dominican Republic. He played baseball growing up in the Dominican Republic and stopped after he moved to New Jersey at the age of eleven. He started to play football as a freshman and played defensive end and running back at Randolph High School in Randolph, New Jersey, earning all-conference honors his senior year. He also ran track and field for the Rams. He was a member of the school record-setting 4 × 100 metres relay team and the 4 × 200 metres relay team. Beltre graduated from Randolph in 2008.

== College career ==
Beltre played for the Towson Tigers from 2009 to 2012. He redshirted in 2008. He appeared in 45 games, starting 40 of them. He was named first-team all-Colonial Athletic Association his final two seasons, third-team all-Colonial Athletic Association as a sophomore and the Tigers’ special teams player of the year as in 2009. Beltre recorded 232 total tackles, including 38 tackles for loss, 11 sacks, three forced fumbles and two fumble recoveries in his college career.

== Professional career ==
Beltre was signed by the NFL's San Diego Chargers on April 27, 2013, after going undrafted in the 2013 NFL draft. He was released by the Chargers on August 31, 2013. He signed a reserve/futures contract with the Oakland Raiders of the NFL on January 12, 2014. Beltre was released by the Raiders on May 19, 2014.

He was signed by the Calgary Stampeders of the CFL on September 10, 2014. He played defensive lineman for the Stampeders from 2014 to 2016.

On January 14, 2017, Beltre signed a reserve/future contract with the New York Jets. On September 2, 2017, Beltre was waived by the Jets and was signed to the practice squad the next day. He was released on September 8, 2017.

Beltre signed with the Toronto Argonauts on May 18, 2018. Beltre excelled on special teams, recording the most special teams tackles in 2019, with 27. A week before the season ended, teammate Chris Rainey was named the Toronto nominee for Most Outstanding Special Teams Player, but Rainey stated his belief that Beltre was more deserving.

With the 2020 CFL season cancelled, Beltre did not play in 2020. He signed as a free agent with the Ottawa Redblacks on May 20, 2021. He was placed on the suspended list on July 9, 2021, and activated six days later. On September 22, 2021, Beltre was added to the six-game injured reserve list due to hip and thumb injuries.

== Broadcasting ==
Beltre served as colour commentator for ESPN Latin America's Spanish-language broadcast of the 106th Grey Cup.
