= Deshon Foxx =

American football player and coach (born 1992)

DeShon Foxx
Shenandoah University
- Title: Vice president & athletics director Adjunct Professor in the Business School - Shenandoah University Instructor of Sociology at Virginia Tech

Personal information
- Born: November 27, 1992 (age 33); Lynchburg, Virginia, U.S.

Career information
- High school: Brookville (Lynchburg)
- College: University of Connecticut Bachelors University of Connecticut Masters Virginia Tech Ph.D
- NFL draft: 2015: undrafted

Career history

Playing
- Seattle Seahawks (2015–2016): New York Jets (2017)*
- * Offseason or practice squad member only

Operations
- Shenandoah University (2024-present) Assistant vice president & athletic director; Shenandoah University (2023-2024) Assistant vice president for advancement; Shenandoah University (2021-2023) Assistant athletics director
- Stats at Pro Football Reference

Dr. DeShon Foxx (born November 27, 1992) is an American former football wide receiver who played college football at the University of Connecticut. Foxx was named the seventh athletic director of Shenandoah University on June 21, 2024, and began his new role on July 29, 2024.

== Early life ==
Foxx attended Brookville High School in Lynchburg, Virginia, where he graduated in 2011.

== College football career ==
Foxx signed his letter of intent to play for Connecticut on February 2, 2011. Foxx played all four years for the Huskies, playing in 36 games over that span.

== Professional football career ==
=== Seattle Seahawks ===
On May 18, 2015 Foxx was signed by the Seattle Seahawks after a three-day rookie mini-camp after running a 4.29 forty yard dash at his pro day. On August 13, 2015, the Seahawks waived Foxx to make room for Alex Singleton. On August 24, 2015 Foxx was re-signed by the Seahawks to replace Jeremy Crayton who had just been waived. On August 31, 2015, Foxx was waived as the Seahawks cut their roster to 75 players. On December 1, 2015 Foxx was signed by the Seahawks to their 53 man roster. On January 18, 2016 Foxx was signed to a futures contract by the Seahawks. On August 29, 2016, Foxx was waived/injured by the Seahawks and placed on injured reserve after clearing waivers. He was released by the Seahawks on September 6, 2016 with an injury settlement.

=== New York Jets ===
On January 11, 2017, Foxx signed a reserve/future contract with the Jets. He was waived by the Jets on May 9, 2017. He was re-signed by the Jets on May 22, 2017. He was waived on August 14, 2017.

== Academic career ==
Dr. DeShon Foxx earned his Master of Science in Sport Management in 2019, during which he also served as an instructor in the Sport Management program at the University. Dr. Foxx then pursued and completed a Ph.D. in Sociology at Virginia Tech, with a concentration in sociopolitical studies. His research focuses on organizational leadership, the sociopolitical landscape of higher education, and educational law

Dr. Foxx currently serves as an instructor of Sociology at Virginia Tech. In addition to his teaching role at Virginia Tech, he is the vice president and director of athletics at Shenandoah University, where he also serves as an Adjunct Professor of Sport Law and management within the School of Business.

== Personal life ==
Following his athletic career, Foxx transitioned into academia and received a Ph.D. in Sociology with a focus on Sociopolitical dynamics at Virginia Tech, where his research focuses on the higher education, educational law, politics and the sociopolitical landscape.

Foxx is known for his strong Christian faith and has been associated with the Reformed Baptist and Brethren Church denominations. He is married and has children.
