= Jeff Adams (American football) =

American football player (born 1989)

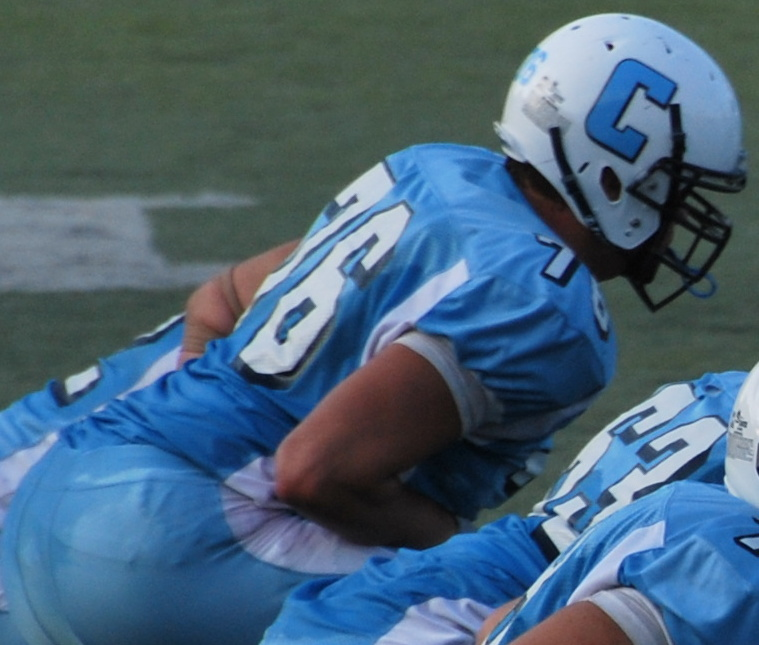
- Adams with the Columbia Lions in 2010

No. 70
- Position: Offensive tackle

Personal information
- Born: September 6, 1989 (age 37); Berwyn, Illinois, U.S.
- Listed height: 6 ft 7 in (2.01 m)
- Listed weight: 305 lb (138 kg)

Career information
- High school: Lyons Township (La Grange, Illinois)
- College: Columbia (2008–2011)
- NFL draft: 2012: undrafted

Career history
- Dallas Cowboys (2012)*; Cincinnati Bengals (2012)*; Miami Dolphins (2012)*; Tennessee Titans (2013)*; Houston Texans (2014–2016); New York Jets (2017)*
- * Offseason or practice squad member only

Career NFL statistics
- Games played: 4
- Games started: 2
- Stats at Pro Football Reference

Jeff Adams (born September 6, 1989) is an American former professional football player who was an offensive tackle in the National Football League (NFL). He played college football for the Columbia Lions.

== Early life ==
Adams played high school football and basketball for the Lyons Township High School Lions. He earned All-West Suburban Conference honors in both football and basketball. He captained the football team his senior year. Adams averaged 13 points, nine rebounds and two blocks per game in basketball. He was also named Class 8A Academic All-State.

== College career ==
Adams played for the Columbia Lions from 2008 to 2011.

== Professional career ==
Adams signed with the Dallas Cowboys on April 30, 2012, after going undrafted in the 2012 NFL draft. He was released by the Cowboys on August 30, 2012.

Adams was signed to the Cincinnati Bengals' practice squad on September 2, 2012. He was released by the Bengals on November 13, 2012.

Adams was signed to the Miami Dolphins' practice squad on November 19, 2012. He was released by the Dolphins on August 31, 2013.

Adams was signed to the Tennessee Titans' practice squad on September 11, 2013. He was released by the Titans on August 29, 2014.

Adams signed with the Houston Texans on August 31, 2014. He made his NFL debut on December 21, 2014, against the Baltimore Ravens. On September 20, 2015, Adams tore his patellar tendon in a game against the Carolina Panthers and on September 21, 2015, Adams was placed on injured reserve.

On September 3, 2016, Adams was released by the Texans. He was re-signed by the Texans on October 26, 2016. On November 7, Adams was once again released by the Texans and was re-signed to the practice squad two days later.

On February 8, 2017, Adams signed with the New York Jets. He was waived on September 1, 2017.
