= Dylan Donahue =

American football player (born 1992)

No. 9
- Position: Linebacker

Personal information
- Born: August 20, 1992 (age 34); Palo Alto, California, U.S.
- Listed height: 6 ft 3 in (1.91 m)
- Listed weight: 247 lb (112 kg)

Career information
- High school: Billings West (Billings, Montana)
- College: West Georgia
- NFL draft: 2017: 5th round, 181st overall pick

Career history
- New York Jets (2017); Atlanta Legends (2019); Winnipeg Blue Bombers (2020); Billings Outlaws (2022–2024)

Awards and highlights
- ArenaBowl champion (XXVIII); First-team All-GSC (2015, 2016); GSC Defensive Player of the year (2016)

Career NFL statistics
- Total tackles: 5
- Stats at Pro Football Reference

Dylan Mitchell Donahue (born August 20, 1992) is an American professional football linebacker. He played college football at West Georgia. He was selected by the New York Jets in the fifth round of the 2017 NFL draft.

== Professional career ==
=== New York Jets ===
Donahue played at The University of Montana-Western, Palomar College and West Georgia before he was selected by the New York Jets in the fifth round, 181st overall, in the 2017 NFL draft. On May 23, 2017, the Jets signed Donahue to four-year, $2.6 million contract. On October 1, 2017, during Week 4 against the Jacksonville Jaguars, Donahue injured his elbow after blocking a punt. He suffered torn ligaments in his elbow, which required surgery, ending his rookie season. In four games of his rookie year in 2017, Donahue finished with five tackles.

On September 1, 2018, Donahue was waived by the Jets.

=== Atlanta Legends ===
In 2019, Donahue joined the Atlanta Legends of the Alliance of American Football. The league ceased operations in April 2019.

=== Winnipeg Blue Bombers ===
Donahue signed with the Winnipeg Blue Bombers on January 20, 2020. He was released on March 12, 2021.

=== Billings Outlaws ===
On July 11, 2024, Donahue signed with the Billings Outlaws of Champions Indoor Football and the Arena Football League, winning ArenaBowl XXVIII after suffering a torn ACL the previous year.

== Personal life ==
On August 3, 2018, it was revealed that Donahue was arrested twice in two separate incidents due to DWI. Dating back to May 9, 2017, he was arrested in Billings Montana for drunk-driving. His blood alcohol content was 0.137, he was fined $1,000, and given a three-month suspended sentence. On the second incident, he was arrested in the Lincoln Tunnel between Weehawken, New Jersey and New York City. He drove the wrong way, crashed into a bus, and was charged for DUI.
