= Deon Simon =

American football player (born 1990)

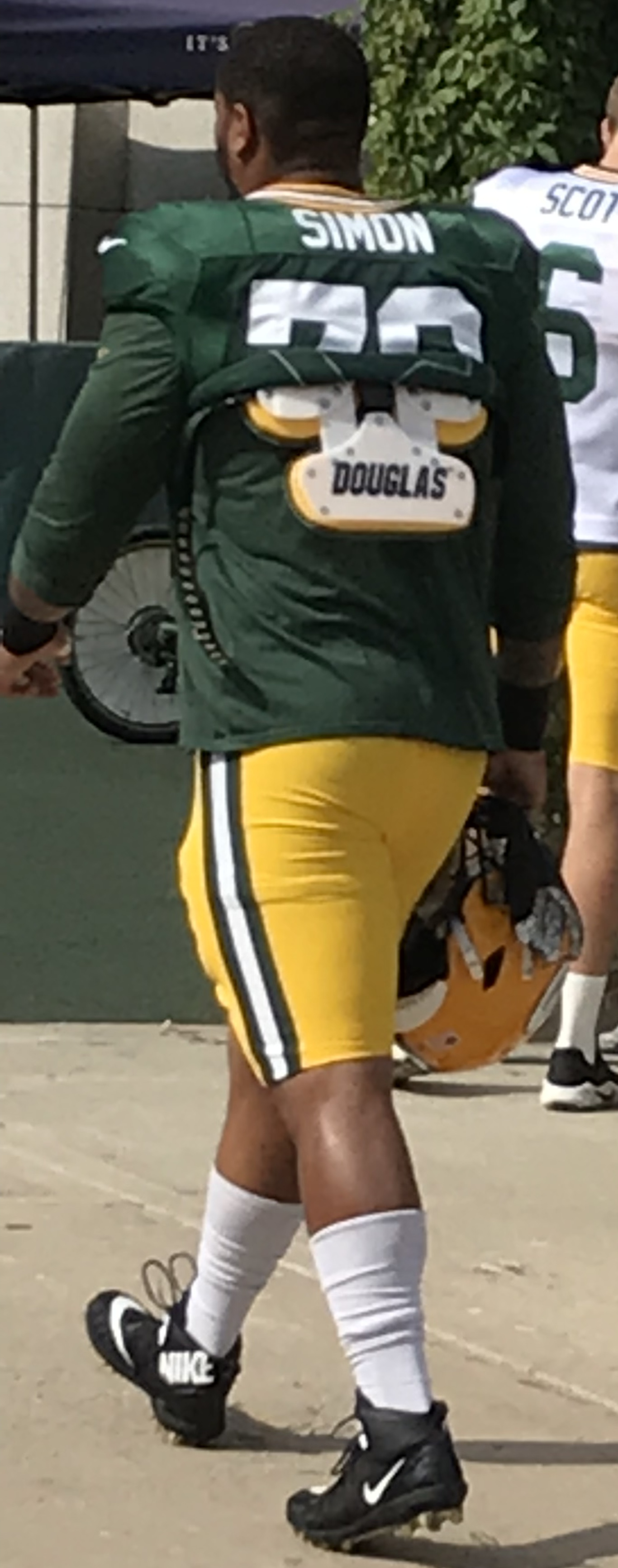
- Simon with the Green Bay Packers in 2019

No. 65, 93, 79, 97
- Position: Nose tackle

Personal information
- Born: July 6, 1990 (age 36); Baton Rouge, Louisiana, U.S.
- Listed height: 6 ft 4 in (1.93 m)
- Listed weight: 332 lb (151 kg)

Career information
- High school: Glen Oaks (Merrydale, Louisiana)
- College: Northwestern State
- NFL draft: 2015: 7th round, 223rd overall pick

Career history
- New York Jets (2015–2017); Tennessee Titans (2018)*; Green Bay Packers (2018–2019)*; Dallas Renegades (2020)*
- * Offseason or practice squad member only

Career NFL statistics
- Total tackles: 23
- Sacks: 1.5
- Stats at Pro Football Reference

Deon Lee Simon (born July 6, 1990) is an American former professional football player who was a nose tackle in the National Football League (NFL). He played college football for the Northwestern State Demons and was selected by the New York Jets in the seventh round of the 2015 NFL draft.

== Early life ==
Simon attended Glen Oaks High School, where he was named to the First-team All-District in his junior season.

== College career ==
At Northwestern State University, Simon was an All-Southland Conference honorable mention in his junior season. Prior to his senior season, he was named to the Southland Conference preseason all-conference first-team.

== Professional career ==
=== New York Jets ===
Simon was selected by the New York Jets in the seventh round (223rd overall) of the 2015 NFL draft. He signed a four-year, $2.3 million contract on May 7, 2015.

Simon was released on September 30, 2015. The Jets re-signed Simon to the practice squad on October 1, 2015.

After a solid training camp and preseason, Simon made the 53-man roster for the 2016 season. He appeared in all 16 games of 2016, finishing with 23 tackles and 1.5 sacks.

On September 2, 2017, Simon was waived by the Jets and was signed to the practice squad the next day. He was promoted to the active roster on December 27, 2017.

On September 1, 2018, Simon was waived by the Jets.

=== Tennessee Titans ===
On September 3, 2018, Simon was signed to the Tennessee Titans' practice squad. He was released on September 25, 2018.

=== Green Bay Packers ===
On September 29, 2018, Simon was signed to the Green Bay Packers' practice squad. He signed a reserve/future contract with the Packers on December 31, 2018. He was released on August 31, 2019.

=== Dallas Renegades ===
On November 22, 2019, Simon was drafted by the Dallas Renegades of the XFL in the 2020 XFL Supplemental Draft. He was waived during final roster cuts on January 22, 2020.
