= Jason Vrable =

American football player and coach (born 1985)

Green Bay Packers
- Title: Passing game coordinator

Personal information
- Born: January 23, 1985 (age 41); South Park, Pennsylvania, U.S.

Career information
- Position: Quarterback
- College: Marietta College

Career history
- South Florida (2007) Strength intern; Marietta (2007) Quarterbacks coach; Robert Morris (2008) Quarterbacks coach; Syracuse (2009-2010); Assistant wide receivers coach (2009); Assistant quarterbacks coach (2010); Charleston (WV) (2011–2012) Offensive coordinator, quarterbacks coach, & running backs coach; Buffalo Bills (2013–2016); Offensive quality control coach (2013-2015; Assistant quarterbacks coach & interim running backs coach (2016); New York Jets (2017–2018) Offensive assistant; Green Bay Packers (2019-present); Offensive assistant (2019); Wide receivers coach (2020-2021); Wide receivers coach & passing game coordinator (2022-2023); Passing game coordinator (2024-present)

Jason Vrable (born January 23, 1985) is an American football coach who is the passing game coordinator for the Green Bay Packers of the National Football League (NFL). He previously served as an assistant coach for the New York Jets, Buffalo Bills, University of Charleston, Syracuse University, Robert Morris University, Marietta College, and the University of South Florida.

Vrable played college football as a quarterback at Marietta College.

== Early life ==
A native of South Park, Pennsylvania, Vrable graduated with a bachelor's degree in sports medicine in 2007 from Marietta College and completed a master's degree in sports management from Robert Morris University in 2009.

== Coaching career ==
=== South Florida ===
In the summer of 2007, Vrable began coaching at the University of South Florida as a strength intern.

=== Marietta College ===
In the fall of 2007, Vrable returned to his alma mater, Marietta College, to be the quarterbacks coach.

=== Robert Morris ===
In 2008, Vrable was hired as the quarterbacks coach of Robert Morris University.

=== Syracuse ===
In 2009, Vrable was hired by Syracuse University as the assistant wide receivers coach. In 2010, Vrable was promoted to assistant quarterbacks coach.

=== Charleston ===
In 2011 and 2012, Vrable was the offensive coordinator, quarterbacks coach, and running backs coach for the University of Charleston.

=== Buffalo Bills ===
From 2013 to 2015, Vrable was the offensive quality control coach of the Buffalo Bills. In 2016, Vrable was promoted to assistant quarterbacks coach. In week 3 of 2016, Vrable was named the interim running backs coach.

=== New York Jets ===
In 2017 and 2018, Vrable worked as an offensive assistant for the New York Jets.

=== Green Bay Packers ===
On February 1, 2019, Vrable was hired as the offensive assistant for the Green Bay Packers. On March 12, 2020, Vrable was promoted to wide receivers coach. On February 1, 2022, Vrable was promoted to wide receivers/passing game coordinator.
